= Slovenia in the Eurovision Song Contest 2021 =

- Eurovision Song Contest 2021
- Participating broadcaster: Radiotelevizija Slovenija (RTVSLO)
- Country: Slovenia
- Selection process: Internal selection
- Announcement date: Artist: 16 May 2020; Song: 27 February 2021

Competing entry
- Song: "Amen"
- Artist: Ana Soklič
- Songwriters: Ana Soklič; Bojan Simončič; Žiga Pirnat; Charlie Mason

Placement
- Semi-final result: Failed to qualify (13th)

Participation chronology

Slovenia was represented at the Eurovision Song Contest 2021 with the song "Amen" written by Ana Soklič, Bojan Simončič, Žiga Pirnat, and Charlie Mason, and performed by Soklič herself. The Slovene participating broadcaster, Radiotelevizija Slovenija (RTVSLO), internally selected Soklič as its representative in the contest, after she was due to compete in 2020 with "Voda" before the 2020 event's cancellation. Ana Soklič was announced at the Slovenian representative on 16 May 2020, while the song, "Amen", was presented to the public on 27 February 2021 during the special show EMA 2021.

Slovenia was drawn to compete in the first semi-final of the Eurovision Song Contest which took place on 18 May 2021. Performing during the show in position 2, "Amen" was not announced among the top 10 entries of the first semi-final and therefore did not qualify to compete in the final. It was later revealed that Slovenia placed thirteenth out of the 16 participating countries in the semi-final with 44 points.

== Background ==
Prior to the 2021 contest, Radiotelevizija Slovenija (RTVSLO) had participated in the Eurovision Song Contest representing Slovenia twenty-five times since its first entry in 1993. Its highest placing in the contest, to this point, has been seventh place, achieved on two occasions: in 1995 with the song "Prisluhni mi" performed by Darja Švajger and in 2001 with the song "Energy" performed by Nuša Derenda. The country's only other top ten result was achieved in 1997 when Tanja Ribič performing "Zbudi se" placed tenth. Since the introduction of semi-finals to the format of the contest in 2004, Slovenia had thus far only managed to qualify to the final on six occasions. In 2019, "Sebi" performed by Zala Kralj and Gašper Šantl qualified to the final and placed fifteenth.

As part of its duties as participating broadcaster, RTVSLO organises the selection of its entry in the Eurovision Song Contest and broadcasts the event in the country. The broadcaster confirmed its participation in the 2021 contest on 16 May 2020. RTVSLO has traditionally selected its entry through a national final entitled Evrovizijska Melodija (EMA), which has been produced with variable formats. For 2021, the broadcaster opted to forego the use of this national final in order to internally select the entry; the last time a Slovenian entry was selected internally was in 2013.

== Before Eurovision ==
=== Internal selection ===
On 16 May 2020, RTVSLO confirmed that Ana Soklič would remain as Slovenia's representative for the Eurovision Song Contest 2021. Following the announcement of Soklič as the selected artist, composers were able to submit their songs to the broadcaster between 13 July 2020 and 30 September 2020. 191 songs were received by the broadcaster during the submission period. An expert committee consisting of Ana Soklič, Darja Švajger (singer, vocal coach and 1995 and 1999 Slovenian Eurovision entrant) and Vladimir Graić (composer of Serbia's winning Eurovision entry "Molitva" in 2007) shortlisted three songs from the received submissions, with the Slovenian entry being determined by an alternate committee consisting of Darja Švajger, Mojca Menart (Head of the publishing business of ZKP RTV Slovenija) and Matevž Šalehar (musician and singer-songwriter) from the three shortlisted songs.

The selected song, entitled "Amen", was presented during the special show EMA 2021 which took place on 27 February 2021 at the RTVSLO Studio 1 in Ljubljana, hosted by Nejc Šmit and former Slovenian Eurovision contestant Lea Sirk who represented Slovenia in 2018. The 2021 edition of EMA simultaneously celebrated Slovenia's 60th anniversary since their first appearance in the Eurovision Song Contest (including Slovenia's appearances as part of Yugoslavia). The song was written by Bojan Simončič, Žiga Pirnat, Charlie Mason and Ana Soklič herself. Mason had previously co-written the Eurovision Song Contest 2014 winning entry "Rise Like a Phoenix".

== At Eurovision ==
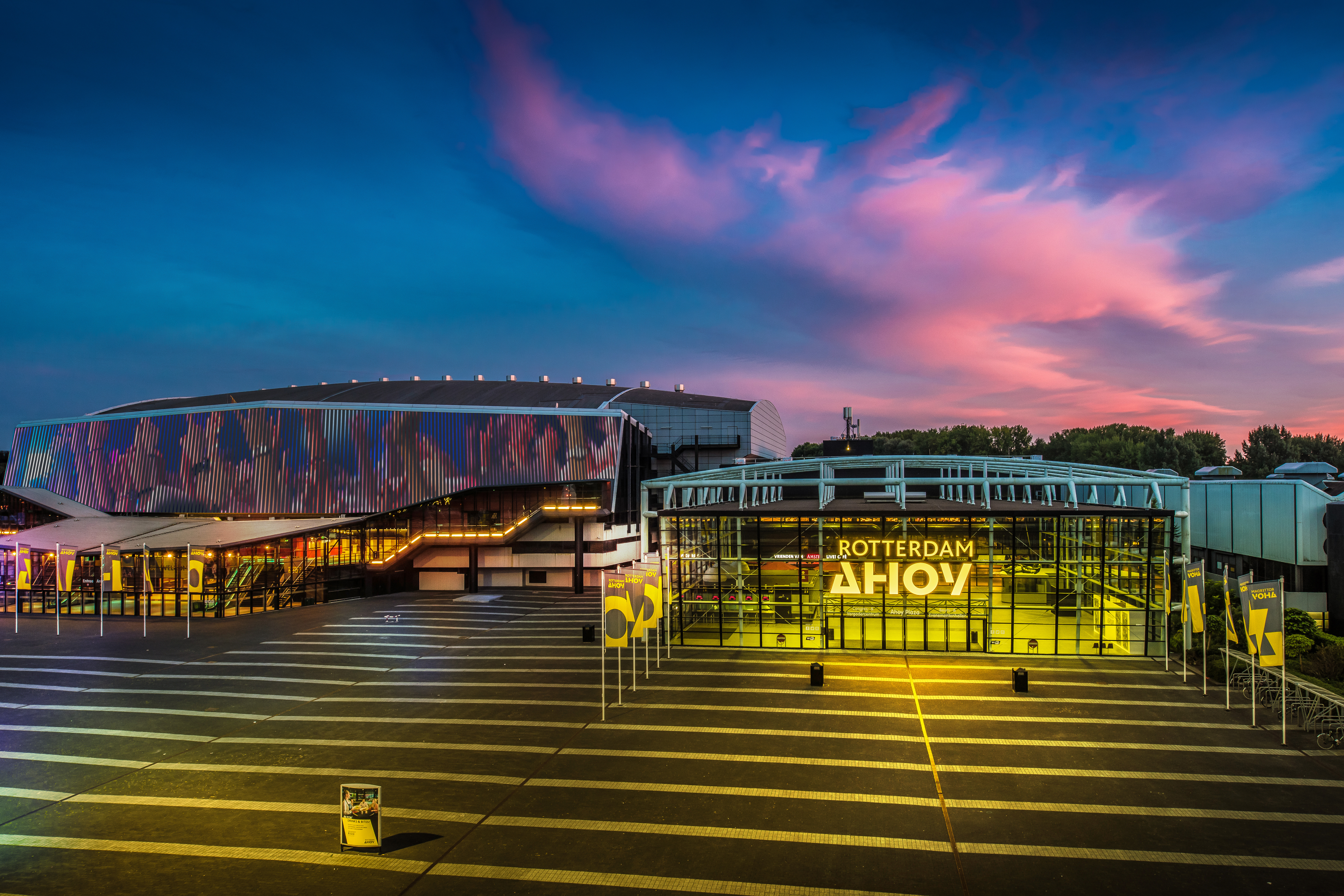
The Eurovision Song Contest 2021 took place at the Rotterdam Ahoy in Rotterdam, Netherlands

According to Eurovision rules, all nations with the exceptions of the host country and the "Big Five" (France, Germany, Italy, Spain and the United Kingdom) are required to qualify from one of two semi-finals in order to compete in the final; the top ten countries from each semi-final progress to the final. The European Broadcasting Union (EBU) split up the competing countries into six different pots based on voting patterns from previous contests, with countries with favourable voting histories put into the same pot. The semi-final allocation draw held for the Eurovision Song Contest 2020 on 28 January 2020 was used for the 2021 contest, which Slovenia was placed into the first semi-final, which was held on 18 May 2021, and was scheduled to perform in the first half of the show.

Once all the competing songs for the 2021 contest had been released, the running order for the semi-finals was decided by the shows' producers rather than through another draw, so that similar songs were not placed next to each other. Slovenia was set to perform in position 2, following the entry from Lithuania and before the entry from Russia.

In Slovenia, the semi-finals were televised on TV SLO 2 and the final was televised on TV SLO 1 with commentary by Mojca Mavec. The contest was also broadcast via radio with all three shows airing on Radio Val 202. The Slovenian spokesperson, who announced the top 12-point score awarded by the Slovenian jury during the final, was Lorella Flego.

=== Semi-final ===
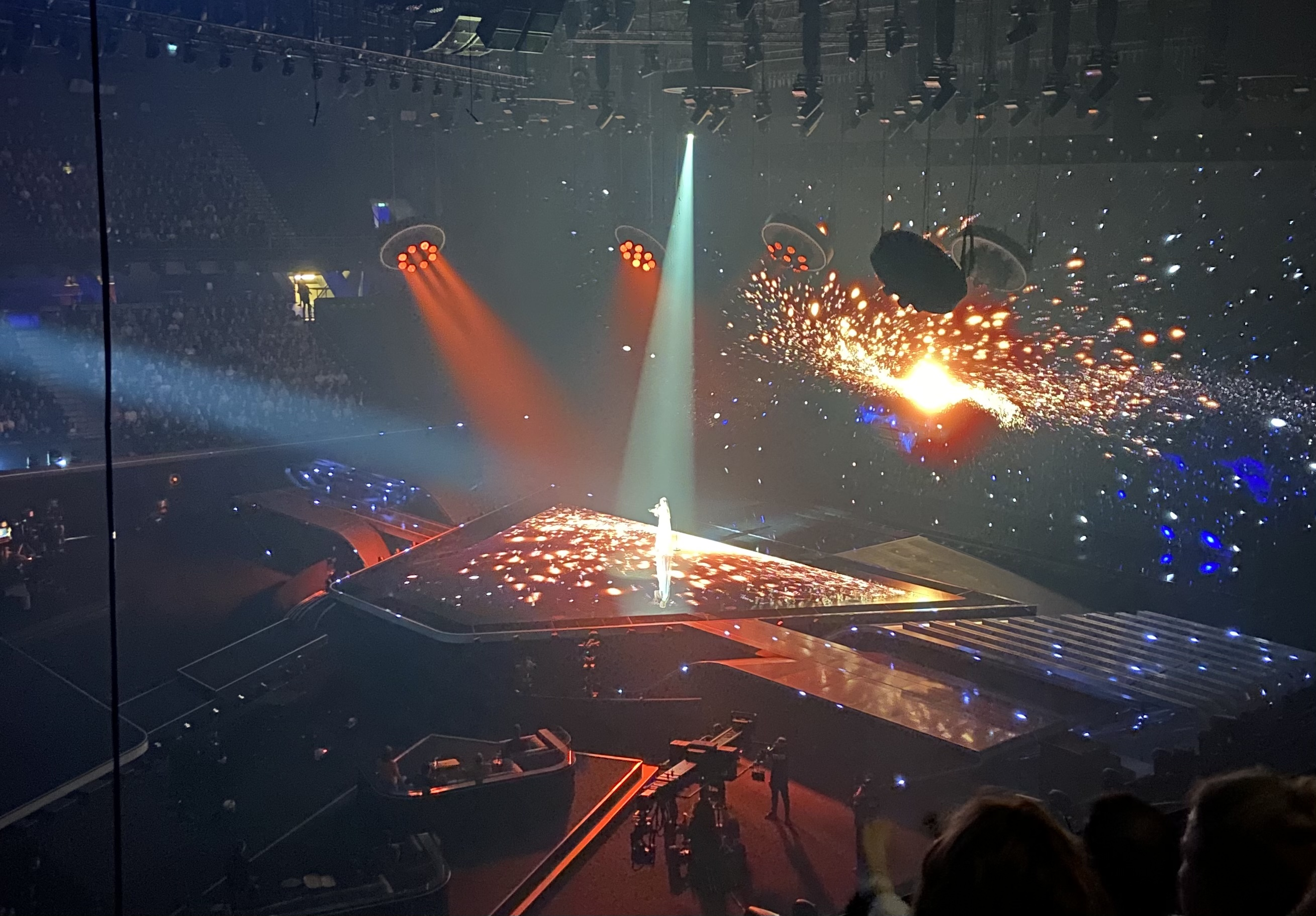
Ana Soklič during a rehearsal before the first semi-final

Ana Soklič took part in technical rehearsals on 8 and 12 May, followed by dress rehearsals on 17 and 18 May. This included the jury show on 17 May where the professional juries of each country watched and voted on the competing entries.

The Slovenian performance featured Ana Soklič performing on stage in a white pant-suit with a floor-length shoulder cape. Soklič was in the middle of the stage at the beginning of the song but later walked towards the satellite stage during the second chorus. The stage colours were gold and the LED screens transitioned from a black hole to glitter and sun and the earth in gold. Ana Soklič was joined by an off-stage backing vocalist: Karin Zemljič.

At the end of the show, Slovenia was not announced among the top 10 entries in the first semi-final and therefore failed to qualify to compete in the final. It was later revealed that Slovenia placed thirteenth in the semi-final, receiving a total of 44 points: 8 points from the televoting and 36 points from the juries.

=== Voting ===
Below is a breakdown of points awarded to Slovenia in the first semi-final, as well as by the country in the final. Voting during the three shows involved each country awarding two sets of points from 1-8, 10 and 12: one from their professional jury and the other from televoting. The exact composition of the professional jury, and the results of each country's jury and televoting were released after the final; the individual results from each jury member were also released in an anonymised form. Slovenia's jury consisted of Bojan Cvjetićanin, Nuša Derenda, Boštjan Grabnar, Amaya, and Raay. In the first semi-final, Slovenia placed 13th with a total of 44 points, thus failing to qualify for the final. The performance received 8 televoting points, while the jury points added to 36, including 7 from Romania. Over the course of the contest, Slovenia awarded its 12 points to Cyprus (jury) and Croatia (televote) in the first semi-final, and to Italy (jury) and Serbia (televote) in the final.

==== Points awarded to Slovenia ====
Points awarded to Slovenia (Semi-final 1)
Score	Televote	Jury
12 points		
10 points		
8 points		
7 points		Romania
6 points		Cyprus
5 points	Croatia	Malta
4 points		Azerbaijan; Norway; Ukraine
3 points	North Macedonia	Israel; North Macedonia
2 points		
1 point		

==== Points awarded by Slovenia ====
Points awarded by Slovenia (Semi-final 1)
Score	Televote	Jury
12 points	Croatia	Cyprus
10 points	Ukraine	Russia
8 points	North Macedonia	Azerbaijan
7 points	Russia	Croatia
6 points	Norway	Malta
5 points	Malta	Belgium
4 points	Belgium	North Macedonia
3 points	Azerbaijan	Norway
2 points	Sweden	Israel
1 point	Cyprus	Ukraine

Points awarded by Slovenia (Final)
Score	Televote	Jury
12 points	Serbia	Italy
10 points	Italy	Iceland
8 points	Greece	Russia
7 points	Ukraine	Switzerland
6 points	France	Belgium
5 points	Switzerland	Malta
4 points	Finland	Finland
3 points	Iceland	Greece
2 points	Norway	France
1 point	Russia	Israel

==== Detailed voting results ====
The following members comprised the Slovene jury:

- Bojan Cvjetićanin – singer, member of Joker Out, would go on to represent Slovenia in the Eurovision Song Contest 2023
- Nuša Derenda – singer-songwriter, represented Slovenia in the Eurovision Song Contest 2001
- Boštjan Grabnar – songwriter, composer of the Slovenian entries to Eurovision in 1998, 2001 and 2006
- Maja Keuc (Amaya) – singer-songwriter, represented Slovenia in the Eurovision Song Contest 2011
- Aleš Vovk (Raay) – songwriter, represented Slovenia in the Eurovision Song Contest 2015 as a member of Maraaya, composer of the Slovenian Eurovision entry in 2014 and junior entries in 2014 and 2015

Detailed voting results from Slovenia (Semi-final 1)
R/O	Country	Jury							Televote	
R/O	Country	Juror A	Juror B	Juror C	Juror D	Juror E	Rank	Points	Rank	Points
01	Lithuania	10	13	10	11	10	12		12	
02	Slovenia									
03	Russia	2	2	2	3	14	2	10	4	7
04	Sweden	12	7	12	8	8	11		9	2
05	Australia	11	12	11	15	15	14		15	
06	North Macedonia	13	4	8	14	3	7	4	3	8
07	Ireland	15	14	15	12	12	15		14	
08	Cyprus	1	3	3	2	2	1	12	10	1
09	Norway	9	6	7	9	9	8	3	5	6
10	Croatia	8	5	5	1	4	4	7	1	12
11	Belgium	4	10	1	13	5	6	5	7	4
12	Israel	6	9	13	10	6	9	2	11	
13	Romania	14	15	14	7	13	13		13	
14	Azerbaijan	3	8	4	5	1	3	8	8	3
15	Ukraine	7	11	9	6	11	10	1	2	10
16	Malta	5	1	6	4	7	5	6	6	5

Detailed voting results from Slovenia (Final)
R/O	Country	Jury							Televote	
R/O	Country	Juror A	Juror B	Juror C	Juror D	Juror E	Rank	Points	Rank	Points
01	Cyprus	13	9	15	7	12	15		15	
02	Albania	10	12	9	15	5	11		12	
03	Israel	5	11	8	14	7	10	1	22	
04	Belgium	6	17	4	20	4	5	6	19	
05	Russia	2	1	1	9	13	3	8	10	1
06	Malta	11	3	12	5	17	6	5	13	
07	Portugal	14	20	19	18	18	19		18	
08	Serbia	16	5	11	10	15	13		1	12
09	United Kingdom	20	25	25	26	26	25		25	
10	Greece	18	10	10	11	2	8	3	3	8
11	Switzerland	4	2	6	4	3	4	7	6	5
12	Iceland	1	6	3	1	8	2	10	8	3
13	Spain	22	21	21	23	21	21		23	
14	Moldova	23	26	24	22	19	23		26	
15	Germany	24	24	22	24	24	24		17	
16	Finland	12	14	13	3	6	7	4	7	4
17	Bulgaria	19	18	16	19	20	20		20	
18	Lithuania	21	22	20	16	10	18		14	
19	Ukraine	8	15	7	12	11	12		4	7
20	France	7	8	5	8	16	9	2	5	6
21	Azerbaijan	9	16	14	17	9	16		16	
22	Norway	17	4	17	13	14	14		9	2
23	Netherlands	25	23	23	25	25	26		24	
24	Italy	3	7	2	2	1	1	12	2	10
25	Sweden	15	13	18	6	23	17		11	
26	San Marino	26	19	26	21	22	22		21	
