= Ukraine in the Eurovision Song Contest 2021 =

- Eurovision Song Contest 2021
- Participating broadcaster: Public Broadcasting Company of Ukraine (UA:PBC)
- Country: Ukraine
- Selection process: Internal selection
- Announcement date: Artist: 18 March 2020; Song: 4 February 2021

Competing entry
- Song: "Shum"
- Artist: Go_A
- Songwriters: Kateryna Pavlenko; Taras Shevchenko; Ihor Didenchuk

Placement
- Semi-final result: Qualified (2nd, 267 points)
- Final result: 5th, 364 points

Participation chronology

Ukraine was represented at the Eurovision Song Contest 2021 with the song "Shum" written by Kateryna Pavlenko, Taras Shevchenko and Ihor Didenchuk. The song was performed by the band Go_A, which were announced by the Ukrainian broadcaster Public Broadcasting Company of Ukraine (UA:PBC) as the Ukrainian representative for the 2021 contest on 18 March 2020 after they were due to compete in the 2020 contest with "Solovey" before the event's cancellation. The song "Shum" was selected as the Ukrainian entry on 1 February 2021 and announced on 4 February 2021.

Ukraine was drawn to compete in the first semi-final of the Eurovision Song Contest which took place on 18 May 2021. Performing during the show in position 15, "Shum" was announced among the top 10 entries of the first semi-final and therefore qualified to compete in the final on 22 May. It was later revealed that Ukraine placed second out of the 16 participating countries in the semi-final with 267 points. In the final, Ukraine performed in position 19 and placed fifth out of the 26 participating countries with 364 points.

== Background ==
Prior to the 2021 contest, Ukraine had participated in the Eurovision Song Contest fifteen times since its first entry in 2003, winning it in 2004 with the song "Wild Dances" performed by Ruslana. Following the introduction of semi-finals for the 2004, Ukraine had managed to qualify to final in every contest they participated in thus far. Ukraine had been the runner-up in the contest on two occasions: in 2007 with the song "Dancing Lasha Tumbai" performed by Verka Serduchka and in 2008 with the song "Shady Lady" performed by Ani Lorak. Ukraine's least successful result had been 24th place, which they achieved, as hosts, in 2017, with the song "Time" performed by O.Torvald.

The Ukrainian national broadcaster, Public Broadcasting Company of Ukraine (UA:PBC), broadcasts the event within Ukraine and organises the selection process for the nation's entry. UA:PBC confirmed their intentions to participate at the 2021 Eurovision Song Contest on 18 March 2020. In the past, UA:PBC had alternated between both internal selections and national finals in order to select the Ukrainian entry. Since 2016, the broadcaster, in collaboration with commercial broadcaster STB, had set up national finals with several artists to choose both the song and performer to compete at Eurovision for Ukraine, with both the public and a panel of jury members involved in the selection. UA:PBC internally selected both the artist and song for 2021, which marked the first time since 2008 that an internal selection was used by the broadcaster to select a Ukrainian entry.

== Before Eurovision ==
=== Internal selection ===
On 18 March 2020, UA:PBC confirmed that Go_A would remain as the Ukrainian representative for the Eurovision Song Contest 2021. The group submitted three songs: "Rano", "Shum" and "Tserkovka", all of which were composed by Kateryna Pavlenko, Taras Shevchenko and Ihor Didenchuk, and the 2021 Ukrainian entry, "Shum", was selected through the votes from an expert jury on 1 February 2021. The jury panel consisted of Jamala (singer-songwriter, winner of the Eurovision Song Contest 2016 for Ukraine), Yevhen Filatov–The Maneken (singer and producer, creator of group Onuka), Ruslan Kvinta (music producer and composer) and two members of the UA:PBC Managing Board, Dmytro Khorkin and Yaroslav Lodyhin.

=== Preparation ===
On 9 February 2021, commercial broadcaster STB announced that the song would be reworked for the Eurovision Song Contest as the original version exceeded three minutes and contained lyrics from the Ukrainian folk song "A v nashoho Shuma". The Eurovision version was premiered on 9 March 2021, together with the official music video, directed by Maksym Tuzhylin, via UA:PBC and the official Eurovision Song Contest's YouTube broadcasts.

== At Eurovision ==
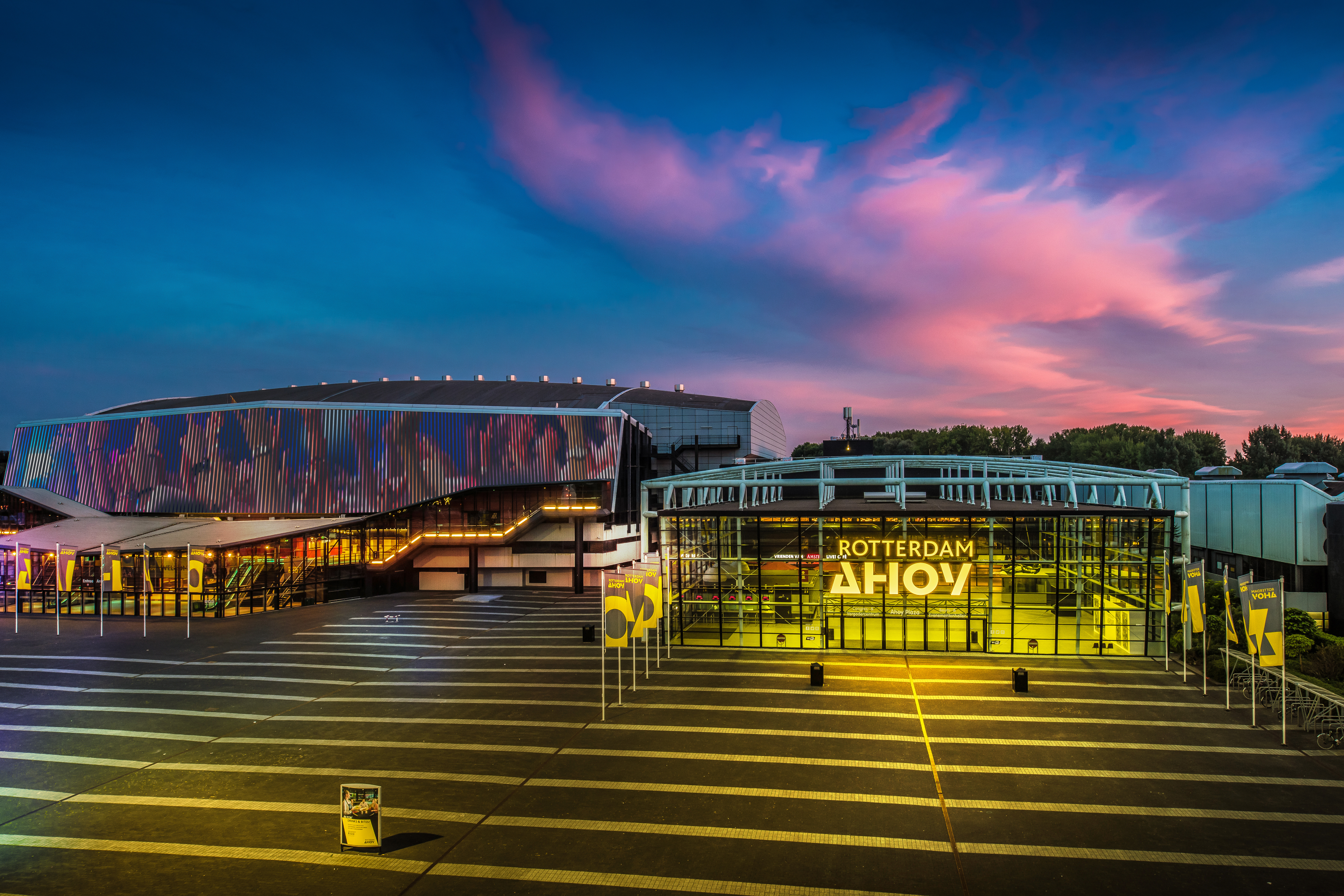
The Eurovision Song Contest 2021 took place at the Rotterdam Ahoy in Rotterdam, Netherlands

According to Eurovision rules, all nations with the exceptions of the host country and the "Big Five" (France, Germany, Italy, Spain and the United Kingdom) are required to qualify from one of two semi-finals in order to compete for the final; the top ten countries from each semi-final progress to the final. The European Broadcasting Union (EBU) split up the competing countries into six different pots based on voting patterns from previous contests, with countries with favourable voting histories put into the same pot. The semi-final allocation draw held for the Eurovision Song Contest 2020 on 28 January 2020 was used for the 2021 contest, which Ukraine was placed into the first semi-final, which was held on 18 May 2021, and was scheduled to perform in the second half of the show.

Once all the competing songs for the 2021 contest had been released, the running order for the semi-finals was decided by the shows' producers rather than through another draw, so that similar songs were not placed next to each other. Ukraine was set to perform in position 15, following the entry from Azerbaijan and preceding the entry from Malta.

In Ukraine, both the semi-finals and the final were broadcast on UA:Pershyi with commentary by Timur Miroshnychenko, and on STB with commentary by Serhiy Prytula. The three shows were also broadcast via radio on UA:Ukrainian Radio with commentary by Olena Zelinchenko, and on UA:Radio Promin with commentary by Anna Zakletska and Dmytro Zakharchenko. The Ukrainian spokesperson, who announced the top 12-point score awarded by the Ukrainian jury during the final, was Tayanna.

=== Semi-final ===
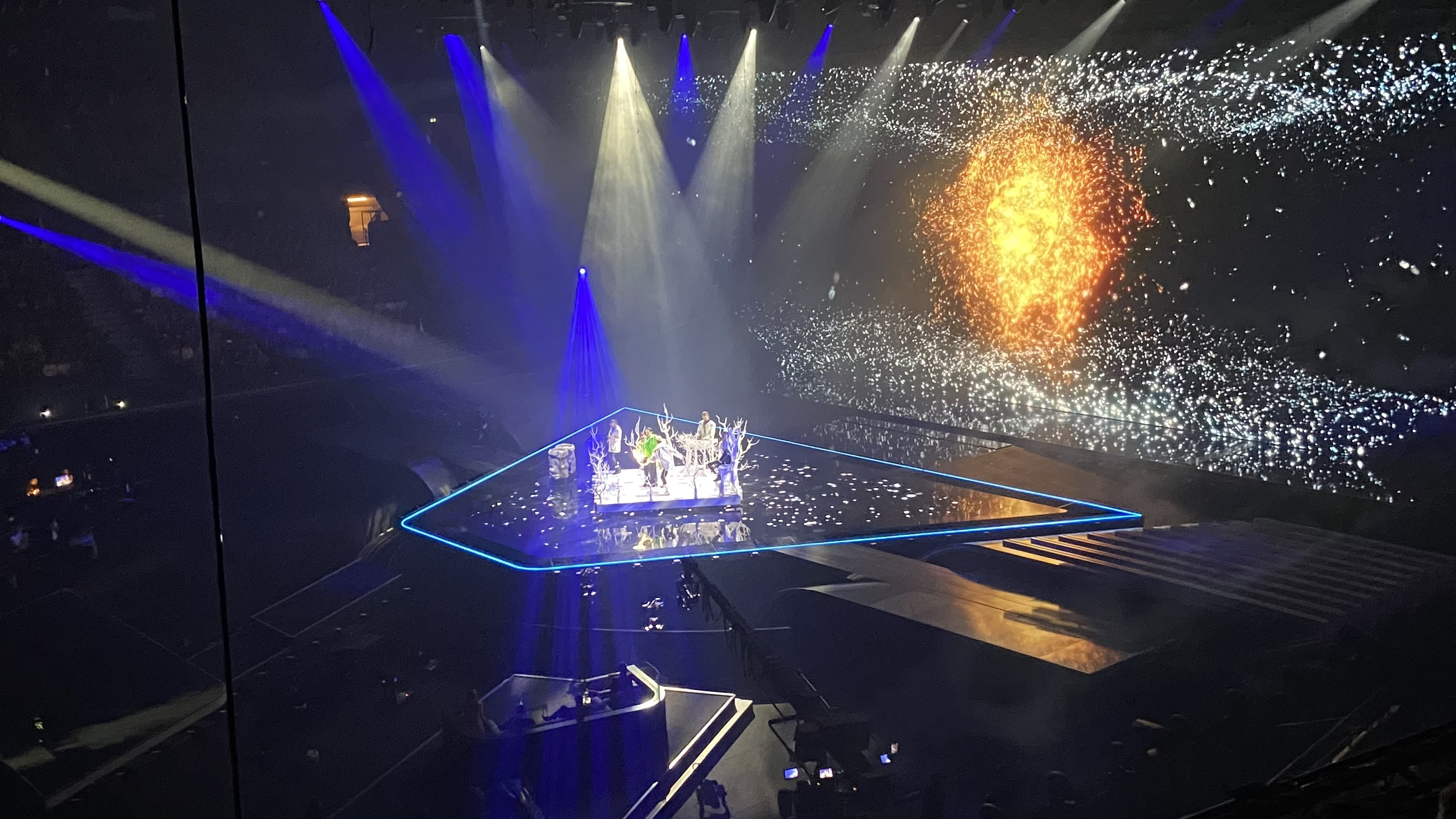
Go_A during a rehearsal before the first semi-final

Go_A took part in technical rehearsals on 9 and 12 May, followed by dress rehearsals on 17 and 18 May. This included the jury show on 17 May where the professional juries of each country watched and voted on the competing entries. Stand-in singer for the Ukrainian performance, Emmie van Stijn, performed with Go_A during the second technical rehearsal in replacement of lead singer Kateryna Pavlenko, who reported feeling ill and had to miss the rehearsal due to the contest's COVID-19 rules. Pavlenko tested negative for COVID-19 the following day and was allowed to perform again.

The Ukrainian performance featured the members of Go_A performing on stage together with two dancers, all of them in costumes designed by Dmytro Kuriata: Kateryna Pavlenko dressed in black with green fur sleeves and the remaining performers dressed in white. The performance featured the performers on a white podium with white tree branches, and the dancers holding ring lights and digging in golden sand. Yellow graphics appeared on the LED screens, which then progressed to blue. The stage directors and choreographers for the Ukrainian performance were Kostiantyn Tomilchenko and Oleksandr Bratkovskyi. The two dancers that joined Go_A on stage were Dmitriy Sharipov and Vania Yurkiv.

At the end of the show, Ukraine was announced as having finished in the top 10 and subsequently qualifying for the grand final. It was later revealed that Ukraine placed second in the semi-final, receiving a total of 267 points: 164 points from the televoting and 103 points from the juries.

=== Final ===
Shortly after the first semi-final, a winners' press conference was held for the ten qualifying countries. As part of this press conference, the qualifying artists took part in a draw to determine which half of the grand final they would subsequently participate in. This draw was done in the order the countries were announced during the semi-final. Ukraine was drawn to compete in the second half. Following this draw, the shows' producers decided upon the running order of the final, as they had done for the semi-finals. Ukraine was subsequently placed to perform in position 19, following the entry from Lithuania and before the entry from France.

Go_A once again took part in dress rehearsals on 21 and 22 May before the final, including the jury final where the professional juries cast their final votes before the live show. The band performed a repeat of their semi-final performance during the final on 22 May. Ukraine placed fifth in the final, scoring 364 points: 267 points from the televoting and 97 points from the juries.

=== Voting ===
Voting during the three shows involved each country awarding two sets of points from 1-8, 10 and 12: one from their professional jury and the other from televoting. Each nation's jury consisted of five music industry professionals who are citizens of the country they represent, with a diversity in gender and age represented. The judges assess each entry based on the performances during the second Dress Rehearsal of each show, which takes place the night before each live show, against a set of criteria including: vocal capacity; the stage performance; the song's composition and originality; and the overall impression by the act. Jury members may only take part in panel once every three years, and are obliged to confirm that they are not connected to any of the participating acts in a way that would impact their ability to vote impartially. Jury members should also vote independently, with no discussion of their vote permitted with other jury members. The exact composition of the professional jury, and the results of each country's jury and televoting were released after the grand final; the individual results from each jury member were also released in an anonymised form.

Below is a breakdown of points awarded to Ukraine and awarded by Ukraine in the first semi-final and grand final of the contest, and the breakdown of the jury voting and televoting conducted during the two shows:

==== Points awarded to Ukraine ====
Points awarded to Ukraine (Semi-final 1)
Score	Televote	Jury
12 points	Australia; Croatia; Italy; Lithuania; Romania; Russia	Lithuania
10 points	Belgium; Germany; Netherlands; Slovenia	Belgium; Romania
8 points	Ireland; Israel	Azerbaijan; Germany
7 points	Azerbaijan; Norway; Sweden	Malta; Norway
6 points	Cyprus	Ireland; Netherlands
5 points	North Macedonia	Croatia; North Macedonia; Russia; Sweden
4 points	Malta	Australia; Israel
3 points		
2 points		
1 point		Slovenia

Points awarded to Ukraine (Final)
Score	Televote	Jury
12 points	France; Israel; Italy; Lithuania; Poland	Lithuania
10 points	Australia; Belgium; Czech Republic; Finland; Moldova; Portugal	Belgium
8 points	Azerbaijan; Croatia; Iceland; Ireland; Serbia	Sweden
7 points	Austria; Romania; Russia; Slovenia	Georgia; Latvia
6 points	Bulgaria; Cyprus; Georgia; Latvia; Spain	Azerbaijan; Ireland
5 points	Estonia; Greece; Netherlands; Norway; San Marino	Australia; Germany; Malta; Romania
4 points	Albania; Germany; North Macedonia; Sweden; United Kingdom	Estonia; Israel
3 points		Iceland; Netherlands; Norway
2 points	Switzerland	Portugal
1 point	Denmark; Malta	Greece; Italy

==== Points awarded by Ukraine ====
Points awarded by Ukraine (Semi-final 1)
Score	Televote	Jury
12 points	Lithuania	Australia
10 points	Azerbaijan	Belgium
8 points	Malta	Croatia
7 points	Israel	Romania
6 points	Russia	Israel
5 points	Belgium	Malta
4 points	Cyprus	Slovenia
3 points	Sweden	Sweden
2 points	Norway	Cyprus
1 point	Australia	Lithuania

Points awarded by Ukraine (Final)
Score	Televote	Jury
12 points	Italy	Italy
10 points	Lithuania	France
8 points	Finland	Switzerland
7 points	Switzerland	Israel
6 points	Iceland	Belgium
5 points	France	Malta
4 points	Russia	Iceland
3 points	Azerbaijan	Azerbaijan
2 points	Sweden	Portugal
1 point	Belgium	Norway

==== Detailed voting results ====
The following members comprised the Ukrainian jury:

- Ihor Kondratiuk
- Alloise
- Oleksandr Ponomariov
- Alyona Savranenko (alyona alyona)
- Kateryna Sereda (Illaria)

Detailed voting results from Ukraine (Semi-final 1)
R/O	Country	Jury							Televote	
R/O	Country	Juror A	Juror B	Juror C	Juror D	Juror E	Rank	Points	Rank	Points
01	Lithuania	13	12	4	13	7	10	1	1	12
02	Slovenia	9	7	5	3	10	7	4	15	
03	Russia	15	15	15	11	15	15		5	6
04	Sweden	7	6	7	6	14	8	3	8	3
05	Australia	4	3	1	1	2	1	12	10	1
06	North Macedonia	12	11	12	5	13	12		14	
07	Ireland	14	14	13	15	11	14		13	
08	Cyprus	6	8	11	14	6	9	2	7	4
09	Norway	10	13	14	12	9	13		9	2
10	Croatia	2	1	8	9	3	3	8	12	
11	Belgium	5	5	3	2	4	2	10	6	5
12	Israel	8	2	2	10	5	5	6	4	7
13	Romania	1	10	6	8	1	4	7	11	
14	Azerbaijan	11	9	9	7	8	11		2	10
15	Ukraine									
16	Malta	3	4	10	4	12	6	5	3	8

Detailed voting results from Ukraine (Final)
R/O	Country	Jury							Televote	
R/O	Country	Juror A	Juror B	Juror C	Juror D	Juror E	Rank	Points	Rank	Points
01	Cyprus	8	12	13	18	24	16		15	
02	Albania	23	22	15	24	22	24		21	
03	Israel	4	5	2	17	4	4	7	13	
04	Belgium	3	10	3	5	20	5	6	10	1
05	Russia	17	25	25	15	25	22		7	4
06	Malta	6	3	6	6	10	6	5	11	
07	Portugal	7	17	7	12	5	9	2	19	
08	Serbia	24	16	22	16	23	21		22	
09	United Kingdom	22	23	21	22	9	18		23	
10	Greece	16	6	20	13	21	15		16	
11	Switzerland	5	4	1	3	12	3	8	4	7
12	Iceland	11	8	5	7	6	7	4	5	6
13	Spain	21	20	18	4	15	13		25	
14	Moldova	15	13	24	20	19	19		18	
15	Germany	18	21	19	21	13	20		14	
16	Finland	19	14	9	14	14	17		3	8
17	Bulgaria	14	9	16	10	16	14		17	
18	Lithuania	13	11	8	9	7	11		2	10
19	Ukraine									
20	France	12	1	10	2	2	2	10	6	5
21	Azerbaijan	9	15	11	8	3	8	3	8	3
22	Norway	2	19	14	19	11	10	1	12	
23	Netherlands	20	24	17	23	18	23		24	
24	Italy	1	2	4	1	1	1	12	1	12
25	Sweden	10	7	12	11	8	12		9	2
26	San Marino	25	18	23	25	17	25		20	
