= Greece in the Eurovision Song Contest 2021 =

- Eurovision Song Contest 2021
- Participating broadcaster: Hellenic Broadcasting Corporation (ERT)
- Country: Greece
- Selection process: Internal selection
- Announcement date: Artist: 18 March 2020; Song: 7 January 2021

Competing entry
- Song: "Last Dance"
- Artist: Stefania
- Songwriters: Dimitris Kontopoulos; Arcade (Pavlos Manolis, Anastasios Rammos, Diveno, Gabriel Russell, Loukas Damianakos, Gioni); Sharon Vaughn

Placement
- Semi-final result: Qualified (6th, 184 points)
- Final result: 10th, 170 points

Participation chronology

Greece was represented at the Eurovision Song Contest 2021 with the song "Last Dance", written by Dimitris Kontopoulos, Arcade, and Sharon Vaughn, and performed by Stefania. The Greek participating broadcaster, the Hellenic Broadcasting Corporation (ERT), internally selected its entry for the contest. Stefania was due to compete in the 2020 contest with "Supergirl" before that event's eventual cancellation. The visual content for the performance was created by Asterman, contributing to the staging and artistic direction of the performance.

To promote the entry, a music video for the song was released and Stefania made appearances on Greek television and in print media. Greece performed fourth in the second semi-final of the Eurovision Song Contest 2021, held on 20 May 2021, and placed 6th, receiving 184 points. The entry qualified for the final held two days later, where the nation placed 10th with 170 points.

== Background ==
Prior to the 2021 contest, Greece had participated in the Eurovision Song Contest 40 times since their debut in 1974. To this point, they won the contest once, in 2005 with the song "My Number One" performed by Helena Paparizou. Following the introduction of semi-finals for the 2004 contest, Greece managed to qualify for the final with each of their entries for several years. Between 2004 and 2013, the nation achieved nine top ten placements in the final. To this point, "Utopian Land" by Argo in 2016 failed to qualify from the semi-finals for the first time ever, being absent from the final for the first time since 2000 and marking Greece's worst result at the contest. In 2018, Greece failed to qualify for the second time with "Oniro mou" by Yianna Terzi finishing 14th in the semi-final. Greece returned to the final in 2019 with "Better Love" by Katerine Duska, placing 21st with 74 points.

As part of its duties as participating broadcaster, the Hellenic Broadcasting Corporation (ERT) organises the selection of its entry in the Eurovision Song Contest and broadcasts the event in the country. ERT's predecessor, the National Radio Television Foundation (EIRT), debuted in the contest in 1974 and then ERT participated from 1975 until 2013, when it was shut down by a government directive and replaced with the interim Dimosia Tileorasi (DT) and later by the New Hellenic Radio, Internet and Television (NERIT) broadcaster. During this time, from 2013 through 2015, the Greek television station MAD TV organised the selection process. On 28 April 2015, a legislative proposal that resulted in the renaming of NERIT to ERT was approved and signed into law by the Hellenic Parliament; ERT began broadcasting once again on 11 June 2015, and shortly after confirmed its intentions to once again participate in the Eurovision Song Contest.

The Greek broadcaster has used various methods to select its entry in the past, such as internal selections and televised national finals, to choose the performer, song or both to compete at Eurovision. On 18 March 2020, the day of the 2020 contest's cancellation, ERT was one of the first four broadcasters to confirm its participation in the next edition and to announce its continued cooperation with their 2020 artist, Stefania. Born in the Netherlands to a family with Greek ancestry, she had previously represented the Netherlands at the Junior Eurovision Song Contest 2016 as part of the group Kisses, placing eighth. At the age of 18, Stefania was the youngest participant selected to compete in the 2021 contest.

== Before Eurovision ==
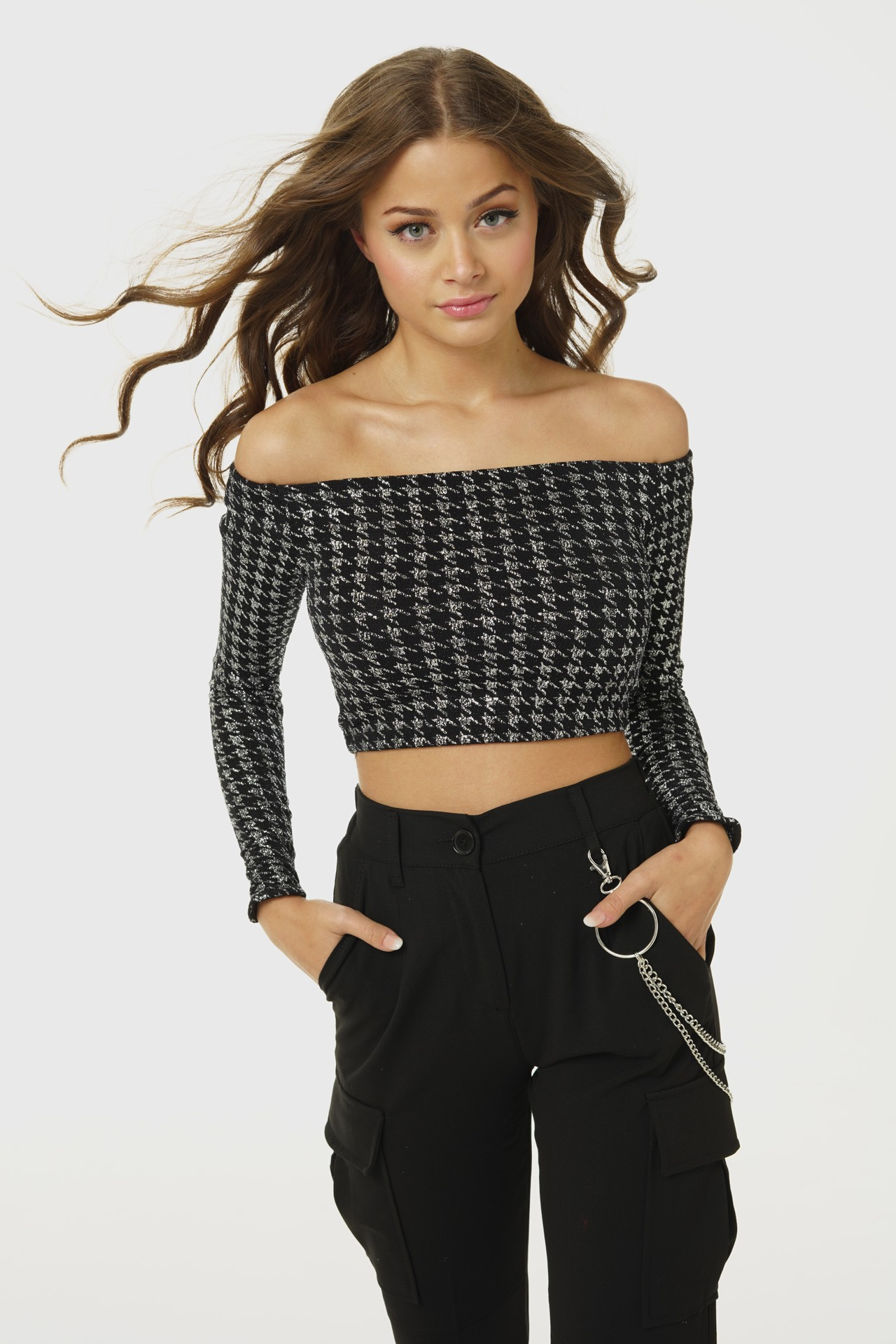
Greek-Dutch performer Stefania was selected as the entrant for Greece.

=== Song selection ===
With ERT opting to continue their cooperation with 2020 artist Stefania for 2021, it was announced that the same team responsible for the songwriting and the choreography of the 2020 entry would also be used for the 2021 contest, and that the song would be selected internally. On 14 December 2020, ERT revealed the names of the people who would comprise the jury panel involved with the selection of the song. The jury consisted of music composer and ERT board member Dimitris Papadimitriou, and music producers Petros Adam and Yiannis Petridis. All three were members of the previous year's jury panel. As it was announced, the jury panel planned to select the Greek entry before the start of 2021, while the song would not be released before March 2021.

Songwriters Dimitris Kontopoulos, the production team Arcade and Sharon Vaughn, submitted at least four potential entries to ERT for consideration. On 18 December 2020, an Instagram post by Stefania on the official account of the Eurovision Song Contest revealed the name of one of the song candidates, "Adrenaline". Three weeks later on 7 January 2021, "Last Dance" was announced as the title of selected song, with its release set for 10 March.

=== Promotion ===
To promote the entry, a music video was released on 10 March, ahead of the song's general release later that evening. It aired during a dedicated show on ERT's over-the-top media service ERTFLIX. Directed by Kostas Karydas, the video was filmed in Athens and features elements of Greek mythology.

Stefania was also interviewed by Greece's celebrity magazine Gala alongside her uncle, actor Yannis Stankoglou, and was featured in a photoshoot in Hello! Greece, talking about her upcoming performance to both magazines. In early May, she appeared on ERT1's show Our Best Easter where she performed an acoustic version of "Last Dance" accompanied by piano. The acoustic version was later performed on the 9 May "Eurovision Night" episode of the Greek version of Your Face Sounds Familiar, where she sang alongside Dimitris Kontopoulos on the piano.

== At Eurovision ==
The Eurovision Song Contest 2021 took place at Rotterdam Ahoy in Rotterdam, the Netherlands, and consisted of two semi-finals held on the respective dates of 18 and 20 May, and the final on 22 May 2021. According to Eurovision rules, all nations with the exceptions of the host country and the "Big Five" (France, Germany, Italy, Spain and the United Kingdom) are required to qualify from one of two semi-finals in order to compete for the final; the top ten countries from each semi-final progress to the final. The European Broadcasting Union (EBU) split up the competing countries into six different pots based on voting patterns from previous contests as determined by the contest's televoting partner Digame. The semi-final allocation draw held for the Eurovision Song Contest 2020 on 28 January 2020 was used for the 2021 contest; Greece was placed into the second semi-final, to be held on 20 May 2021, and was scheduled to perform in the first half of the show. Once all the competing songs for the 2021 contest had been released, the running order for the semi-finals was decided by the shows' producers rather than through another draw, so that similar songs were not placed next to each other. Greece was set to perform fourth, following the entry from Czech Republic and preceding the entry from Austria. The two semi-finals and the final were televised in Greece on ERT with commentary by Maria Kozakou and Giorgos Kapoutzidis.

=== Performances ===
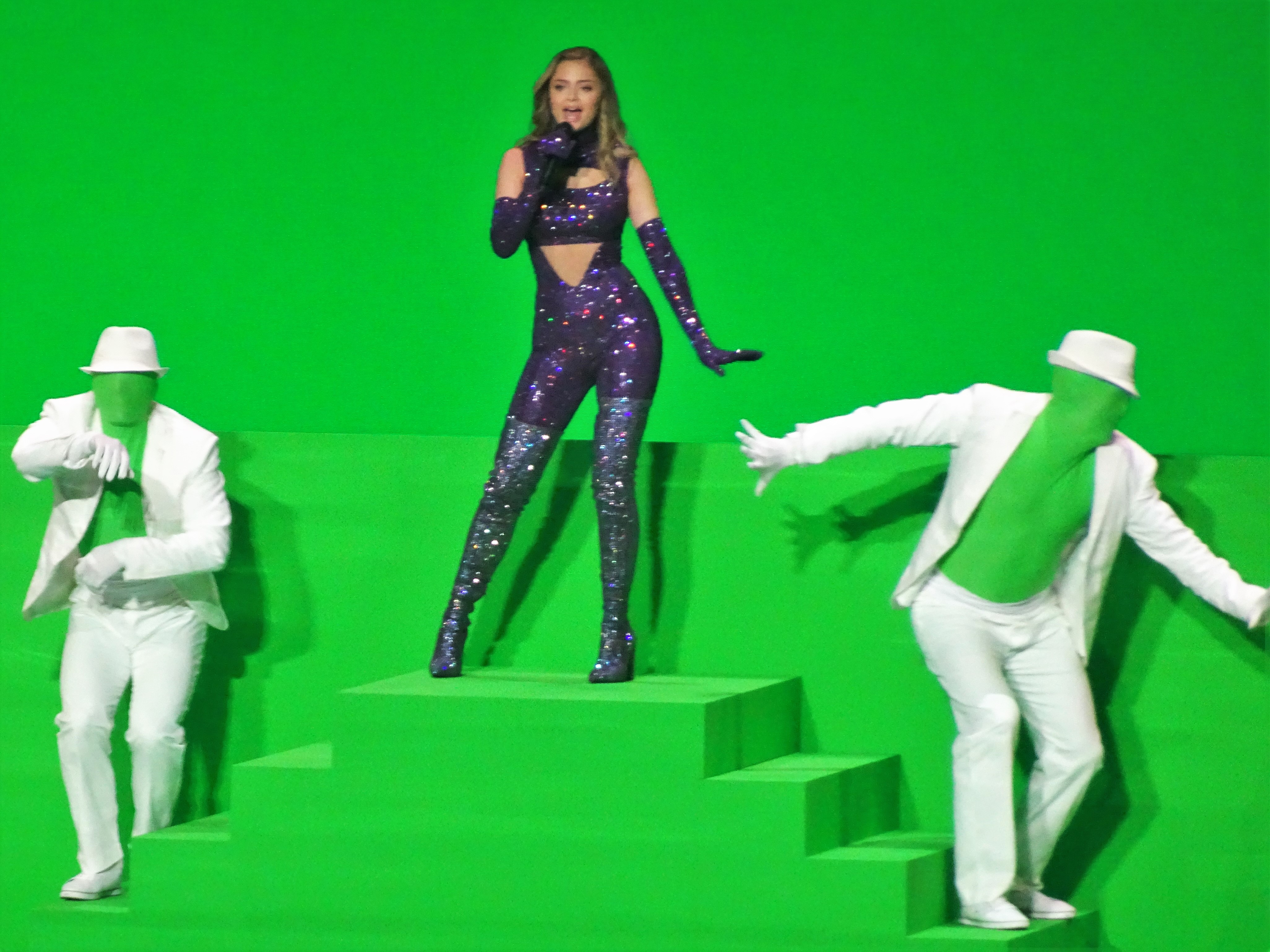
A green screen was used for the performance of "Last Dance" on stage.

Fokas Evangelinos served as the artistic director for the entry, responsible for its stage presence. The performance featured Stefania in purple amongst a green screen which removed the bodies of her four dancers leaving them as empty white suits, an arrangement which created a marked difference between what television and online viewers saw versus the limited live audience. The dancers included George Papadopoulos (stage director for the Greek entry at the 2014 Contest), Nikos Koukakis, Markos Giakoumoglou and Costas Pavlopoulos. Stefania's outfit was designed by Greek fashion designer Vrettos Vrettakos, who had previously worked with Beyoncé as well as Eurovision alumni Eleni Foureira and Helena Paparizou. Technical rehearsals for the performance took place the week prior to the contest, on 10 and 13 May 2021.

The second semi-final was held on 20 May and Greece was the ninth country of the ten to be announced as having qualified for the final. It was later revealed that the entry placed sixth in the semi-final, receiving a total of 184 points. Soon after, the EBU posted the running order for the final, placing Greece in position 10, following United Kingdom and preceding Switzerland. At the close of voting for the final, held on 22 May, "Last Dance" placed 10th in the field of 26, receiving 170 points.

=== Voting ===
Voting during the three shows involved each country awarding two sets of points from 1-8, 10 and 12: one from their professional jury and the other from televoting. The exact composition of the professional jury, and the results of each country's jury and televoting were released after the final; the individual results from each jury member were also released in an anonymised form. Greece's jury consisted of Adam Tsarouchis, Athena Konstantinou, Fotis Sergoulopoulos, Ioannis Vasilopoulos, and Xenia Ghali. In the second semi-final, Greece placed 6th with a total of 184 points, thus qualifying for the final. The performance received 80 televoting points, which included the maximum 12 awarded by Moldova. The jury points added to 104, including 12 from France and Poland. In the final, Greece placed 10th with 170 points, with two sets of 12 points from Cyprus (jury and televote), one set each from Georgia (televote) and France (jury). Over the course of the contest, Greece awarded both sets of 12 points from its jury and televote respectively to Moldova in the second semi-final and to Cyprus in the final. Manolis Gkinis served as Greece's spokesperson for the voting portion of the final, announcing the country's jury vote. At 10 years old, the actor from the ERT series Ta kalytera mas chronia became the youngest spokesperson in contest history to this point. Below is a breakdown of points awarded to Greece in the second semi-final, as well as by the country in the final.

==== Points awarded to Greece ====
Points awarded to Greece (Semi-final 2)
Score	Televote	Jury
12 points	Moldova	France; Poland
10 points	Albania; Georgia; Portugal	Albania; Bulgaria; San Marino
8 points	Bulgaria; Serbia	Moldova; Serbia
7 points		Iceland; Spain
6 points		Finland
5 points	Iceland; San Marino	Czech Republic
4 points		
3 points	Denmark	Estonia; Portugal
2 points	Czech Republic; Finland; Switzerland	Denmark
1 point	Latvia; Spain; United Kingdom	Switzerland

Points awarded to Greece (Final)
Score	Televote	Jury
12 points	Cyprus; Georgia	Cyprus; France
10 points	Netherlands	Azerbaijan
8 points	Albania; Czech Republic; Slovenia	Bulgaria; Moldova; San Marino
7 points	Moldova; San Marino	Russia
6 points		Albania; Malta
5 points		
4 points		Iceland
3 points	Serbia	Serbia; Slovenia
2 points	Bulgaria; Portugal	Finland
1 point		Norway; Spain

==== Points awarded by Greece ====
Points awarded by Greece (Semi-final 2)
Score	Televote	Jury
12 points	Moldova	Moldova
10 points	Albania	San Marino
8 points	Finland	Bulgaria
7 points	Switzerland	Iceland
6 points	Bulgaria	Albania
5 points	Iceland	Portugal
4 points	Serbia	Czech Republic
3 points	Portugal	Serbia
2 points	San Marino	Poland
1 point	Denmark	Estonia

Points awarded by Greece (Final)
Score	Televote	Jury
12 points	Cyprus	Cyprus
10 points	Italy	Moldova
8 points	France	Bulgaria
7 points	Albania	San Marino
6 points	Finland	Malta
5 points	Ukraine	France
4 points	Switzerland	Italy
3 points	Malta	Belgium
2 points	Azerbaijan	Russia
1 point	Russia	Ukraine

==== Detailed voting results ====
The following members comprised the Greek jury:

- Xenia Ghali
- Athena Konstantinou
- Fotis Sergoulopoulos
- Adam Tsarouchis
- Ioannis Vasilopoulos

Detailed voting results from Greece (Semi-final 2)
R/O	Country	Jury							Televote	
R/O	Country	Juror A	Juror B	Juror C	Juror D	Juror E	Rank	Points	Rank	Points
01	San Marino	3	3	7	2	2	2	10	9	2
02	Estonia	9	9	4	9	13	10	1	13	
03	Czech Republic	15	5	14	11	3	7	4	15	
04	Greece									
05	Austria	14	8	15	12	4	13		14	
06	Poland	7	7	6	10	9	9	2	16	
07	Moldova	2	1	1	1	1	1	12	1	12
08	Iceland	1	13	10	6	10	4	7	6	5
09	Serbia	5	12	5	7	15	8	3	7	4
10	Georgia	8	10	9	13	14	14		11	
11	Albania	10	6	3	8	7	5	6	2	10
12	Portugal	6	4	8	14	8	6	5	8	3
13	Bulgaria	4	2	2	5	5	3	8	5	6
14	Finland	11	16	16	15	16	16		3	8
15	Latvia	12	14	12	3	12	12		12	
16	Switzerland	13	11	13	4	6	11		4	7
17	Denmark	16	15	11	16	11	15		10	1

Detailed voting results from Greece (Final)
R/O	Country	Jury							Televote	
R/O	Country	Juror A	Juror B	Juror C	Juror D	Juror E	Rank	Points	Rank	Points
01	Cyprus	3	3	1	2	1	1	12	1	12
02	Albania	12	11	12	9	10	17		4	7
03	Israel	9	21	21	3	19	15		22	
04	Belgium	14	10	14	1	23	8	3	18	
05	Russia	4	12	8	16	7	9	2	10	1
06	Malta	8	6	9	8	4	5	6	8	3
07	Portugal	17	19	2	21	24	16		19	
08	Serbia	13	16	18	12	17	19		16	
09	United Kingdom	23	23	15	22	21	24		24	
10	Greece									
11	Switzerland	11	15	3	17	16	14		7	4
12	Iceland	2	14	16	18	15	13		11	
13	Spain	21	18	20	24	11	20		23	
14	Moldova	5	5	6	4	3	2	10	21	
15	Germany	24	25	24	19	22	25		20	
16	Finland	19	17	19	25	18	22		5	6
17	Bulgaria	6	2	5	5	9	3	8	12	
18	Lithuania	20	22	4	7	8	11		13	
19	Ukraine	16	7	17	23	2	10	1	6	5
20	France	1	13	10	13	14	6	5	3	8
21	Azerbaijan	10	8	11	10	6	12		9	2
22	Norway	22	20	22	14	20	21		14	
23	Netherlands	25	24	25	20	13	23		25	
24	Italy	15	1	13	15	12	7	4	2	10
25	Sweden	18	9	23	11	25	18		15	
26	San Marino	7	4	7	6	5	4	7	17	
