= Switzerland in the Eurovision Song Contest 2021 =

- Eurovision Song Contest 2021
- Participating broadcaster: Swiss Broadcasting Corporation (SRG SSR)
- Country: Switzerland
- Selection process: Internal selection
- Announcement date: Artist: 20 March 2020; Song: 10 March 2021

Competing entry
- Song: "Tout l'univers"
- Artist: Gjon's Tears
- Songwriters: Gjon Muharremaj; Wouter Hardy; Nina Sampermans; Xavier Michel

Placement
- Semi-final result: Qualified (1st, 291 points)
- Final result: 3rd, 432 points

Participation chronology

Switzerland was represented at the Eurovision Song Contest 2021 with the song "Tout l'univers", written by Gjon Muharremaj, Wouter Hardy, Nina Sampermans, and Xavier Michel, and performed by Muharremaj himself under his stage name Gjon's Tears. The song was internally selected by the Swiss broadcaster Swiss Broadcasting Corporation (SRG SSR) to represent the nation at the 2021 contest in Rotterdam, Netherlands, after they were due to compete in the 2020 contest with "Répondez-moi" before the 2020 event's cancellation. "Tout l'univers" was presented to the public on 10 March 2021.

Switzerland was drawn to compete in the second semi-final of the Eurovision Song Contest which took place on 20 May 2021. Performing during the show in position 16, "Tout l'univers" was announced among the top 10 entries of the second semi-final and therefore qualified to compete in the final on 18 May. It was later revealed that Switzerland placed first out of the 17 participating countries in the semi-final with 291 points. In the final, Switzerland performed in position 11 and placed third out of the 26 participating countries, scoring 432 points.

== Background ==
Prior to the 2021 contest, Switzerland had participated in the Eurovision Song Contest sixty times since its first entry in 1956. Switzerland is noted for having won the first edition of the Eurovision Song Contest with the song "Refrain" performed by Lys Assia. Their second and, to this point, most recent victory was achieved in 1988 when Canadian singer Céline Dion won the contest with the song "Ne partez pas sans moi". Following the introduction of semi-finals for the 2004, Switzerland had managed to participate in the final four times up to this point. In 2005, the internal selection of Estonian girl band Vanilla Ninja, performing the song "Cool Vibes", qualified Switzerland to the final where they placed 8th. Due to their successful result in 2005, Switzerland was pre-qualified to compete directly in the final in 2006. Between 2007 and 2010, the nation failed to qualify to the final after a string of internal selections. Opting to organize a national final between 2011 and 2018, Switzerland has managed to qualify to the final twice out of the last eight years. In 2019, Switzerland returned to an internal selection and earned their highest result in the contest since 2014, qualifying to the final and placing 4th with the song "She Got Me" performed by Luca Hänni.

The Swiss national broadcaster, Swiss Broadcasting Corporation (SRG SSR), broadcasts the event within Switzerland and organises the selection process for the nation's entry. SRG SSR confirmed their intentions to participate at the 2021 Eurovision Song Contest on 20 March 2020. On 11 May 2020, the broadcaster announced that the Swiss entry for the 2021 contest would be selected internally. Switzerland has selected their entry for the Eurovision Song Contest through both national finals and internal selections in the past. Between 2011 and 2018, the broadcaster has opted to organize a national final in order to select their entry. In 2019, the Swiss entry was internally selected for the competition.

== Before Eurovision ==
=== Internal selection ===
On 20 March 2020, SRG SSR confirmed that Gjon's Tears would remain as Switzerland's representative for the Eurovision Song Contest 2021. Multiple songwriting camps were held during which 20 songs were created by Gjon's Tears along with Swiss and international composers for the selection process, and the combination of a 100-member public panel (50%) and the votes of a 20-member international expert jury (50%) selected the winning song. The members of the public panel were Swiss residents put together according to selected criteria in cooperation with Digame, while the international jury consisted of members who had been national juries for their respective countries at the Eurovision Song Contest. "Tout l'univers" was presented to the public as the song on 10 March 2021 via the release of the official music video on the official Eurovision Song Contest's YouTube channel. The song was written by Gjon's Tears together with Wouter Hardy, Nina Sampermans and Xavier Michel.

I am so happy that I will finally be able to take part in Eurovision this year and that I can spread a positive message with my song. It was important for us to keep hope in this particularly difficult time: we must not give up and we must stay strong. With love, friendship, strength and courage, we can rebuild our future. I am convinced that in this exceptional situation it is possible to rediscover and reinvent ourselves.

— Gjon's Tears

=== Preparation ===
On 17 March, Gjon's Tears recorded his 'live-on-tape' performance at the SRF studios in Zürich. This would have been used in the event that he was unable to travel to Rotterdam, or subjected to quarantine on arrival.

== At Eurovision ==
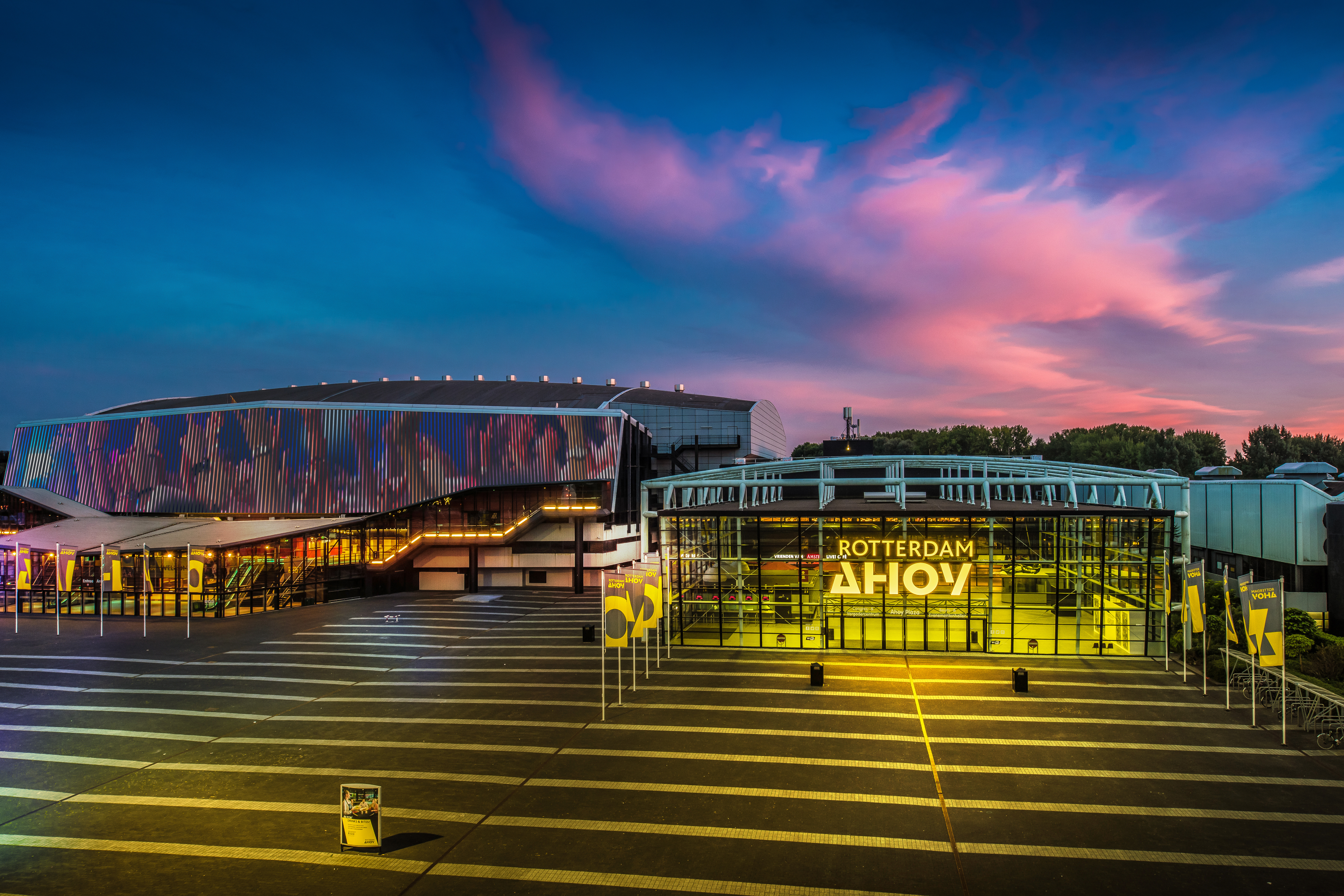
The Eurovision Song Contest 2021 took place at the Rotterdam Ahoy in Rotterdam, Netherlands

According to Eurovision rules, all nations with the exceptions of the host country and the "Big Five" (France, Germany, Italy, Spain and the United Kingdom) are required to qualify from one of two semi-finals in order to compete for the final; the top ten countries from each semi-final progress to the final. The European Broadcasting Union (EBU) split up the competing countries into six different pots based on voting patterns from previous contests, with countries with favourable voting histories put into the same pot. The semi-final allocation draw held for the Eurovision Song Contest 2020 on 28 January 2020 was used for the 2021 contest, which Switzerland was placed into the second semi-final, to be held on 20 May 2021, and was scheduled to perform in the second half of the show.

Once all the competing songs for the 2021 contest had been released, the running order for the semi-finals was decided by the shows' producers rather than through another draw, so that similar songs were not placed next to each other. Switzerland was set to perform in position 16, following the entry from Latvia and before the entry from Denmark.

In Switzerland, three broadcasters that form SRG SSR aired the contest. Sven Epiney provided German commentary for both semi-finals airing on SRF zwei and the final airing on SRF 1. Jean-Marc Richard and Nicolas Tanner provided French commentary for the second semi-final on RTS 2 and together with Joseph Gorgoni for the final RTS 1. Clarissa Tami and 2014 Swiss Eurovision Song Contest entrant Sebalter provided Italian commentary for the second semi-final on RSI La 2 and the final on RSI La 1. The Swiss spokesperson, who announced the top 12-point score awarded by the Swiss jury during the final, was Angélique Beldner.

=== Semi-final ===
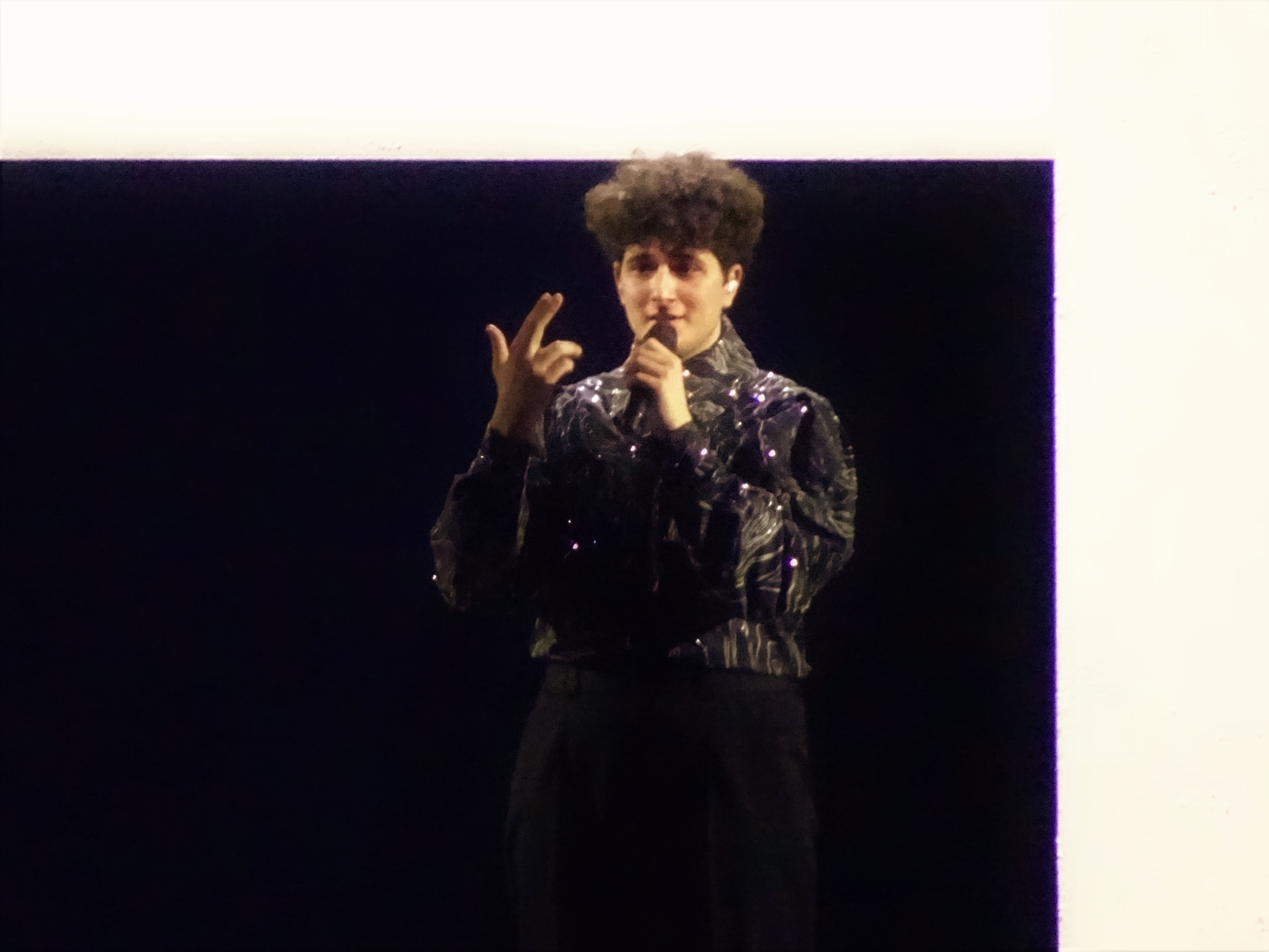
Gjon's Tears during a rehearsal before the second semi-final

Gjon's Tears took part in technical rehearsals on 11 and 14 May, followed by dress rehearsals on 19 and 20 May. This included the jury show on 19 May where the professional juries of each country watched and voted on the competing entries.

The Swiss performance featured Gjon's Tears performing alone on stage in an embroidered black shirt with silver accents. The stage featured a giant white 3D frame prop which Gjon's Tears stood and performed a choreographed routine on throughout the performance. During the second chorus, two pieces of the frame moved apart with Gjon's Tears standing on a lone beam for the remainder of the song. The LED screens displayed a molten silver effect and flashing lights were also used for the performance. The creative director of the Swiss performance was Sacha Jean-Baptiste.

At the end of the show, Switzerland was announced as having finished in the top 10 and subsequently qualifying for the grand final. It was later revealed that Switzerland placed first in the semi-final, receiving a total of 291 points: 135 points from the televoting and 156 points from the juries.

=== Final ===
Shortly after the second semi-final, a winners' press conference was held for the ten qualifying countries. As part of this press conference, the qualifying artists took part in a draw to determine which half of the grand final they would subsequently participate in. This draw was done in the order the countries were announced during the semi-final. Switzerland was drawn to compete in the first half. Following this draw, the shows' producers decided upon the running order of the final, as they had done for the semi-finals. Switzerland was subsequently placed to perform in position 11, following the entry from Greece and before the entry from Iceland.

Gjon's Tears once again took part in dress rehearsals on 21 and 22 May before the final, including the jury final where the professional juries cast their final votes before the live show. Gjon's Tears performed a repeat of his semi-final performance during the final on 22 May. Switzerland placed third in the final, scoring 432 points: 165 points from the televoting and 267 points from the juries.

=== Voting ===
Voting during the three shows involved each country awarding two sets of points from 1-8, 10 and 12: one from their professional jury and the other from televoting. Each nation's jury consisted of five music industry professionals who are citizens of the country they represent, with a diversity in gender and age represented. The judges assess each entry based on the performances during the second Dress Rehearsal of each show, which takes place the night before each live show, against a set of criteria including: vocal capacity; the stage performance; the song's composition and originality; and the overall impression by the act. Jury members may only take part in panel once every three years, and are obliged to confirm that they are not connected to any of the participating acts in a way that would impact their ability to vote impartially. Jury members should also vote independently, with no discussion of their vote permitted with other jury members. The exact composition of the professional jury, and the results of each country's jury and televoting were released after the grand final; the individual results from each jury member were also released in an anonymised form.

Below is a breakdown of points awarded to Switzerland and awarded by Switzerland in the second semi-final and grand final of the contest, and the breakdown of the jury voting and televoting conducted during the two shows:

==== Points awarded to Switzerland ====
Points awarded to Switzerland (Semi-final 2)
Score	Televote	Jury
12 points	Albania	Albania; Austria; Denmark; Estonia; Georgia; Iceland; Spain
10 points	Finland; Moldova	Finland; Latvia
8 points	Austria; France; Poland; Portugal	Czech Republic; Poland; United Kingdom
7 points	Bulgaria; Czech Republic; Denmark; Greece; Iceland; Spain	Moldova; Portugal
6 points	Estonia; Latvia; San Marino	San Marino
5 points	Serbia	Serbia
4 points		
3 points	Georgia; United Kingdom	France
2 points		
1 point		

Points awarded to Switzerland (Final)
Score	Televote	Jury
12 points	Albania	Albania; Belgium; Denmark; Estonia; Finland; Israel; Iceland; Latvia
10 points		Australia; Austria; Georgia; Germany; Malta; Spain
8 points		Croatia; Lithuania; Ukraine; United Kingdom
7 points	Finland; Netherlands; North Macedonia; Poland; Spain; Ukraine	France; Norway; Poland; Portugal; Romania; Slovenia
6 points	Denmark; France; Iceland; Israel; Lithuania; Portugal	North Macedonia
5 points	Australia; Austria; Croatia; Romania; Russia; Slovenia; Sweden	Czech Republic; Ireland; Netherlands; Sweden
4 points	Azerbaijan; Belgium; Greece; Latvia; Moldova	San Marino
3 points	Bulgaria; Czech Republic; Ireland; San Marino	Moldova
2 points	Estonia; Germany; Norway	Cyprus
1 point	Serbia; United Kingdom	Russia; Serbia

==== Points awarded by Switzerland ====
Points awarded by Switzerland (Semi-final 2)
Score	Televote	Jury
12 points	Serbia	Bulgaria
10 points	Portugal	Portugal
8 points	Albania	Iceland
7 points	Iceland	Austria
6 points	Finland	Finland
5 points	Denmark	Albania
4 points	Austria	Serbia
3 points	Bulgaria	Estonia
2 points	Greece	San Marino
1 point	Estonia	Greece

Points awarded by Switzerland (Final)
Score	Televote	Jury
12 points	Serbia	France
10 points	Italy	Bulgaria
8 points	Portugal	Italy
7 points	Albania	Portugal
6 points	France	Malta
5 points	Iceland	Iceland
4 points	Finland	Lithuania
3 points	Sweden	Russia
2 points	Ukraine	Azerbaijan
1 point	Lithuania	Finland

==== Detailed voting results ====
The following members comprised the Swiss jury:

- Sophie de Quay
- Chiara Dubey
- Rico Fischer
- Lisa Oribasi
- Georg Schlunegger

Detailed voting results from Switzerland (Semi-final 2)
R/O	Country	Jury							Televote	
R/O	Country	Juror A	Juror B	Juror C	Juror D	Juror E	Rank	Points	Rank	Points
01	San Marino	8	6	12	6	10	9	2	12	
02	Estonia	4	11	10	5	14	8	3	10	1
03	Czech Republic	9	14	13	9	8	12		16	
04	Greece	7	9	7	14	6	10	1	9	2
05	Austria	3	5	4	3	9	4	7	7	4
06	Poland	12	15	15	15	16	15		13	
07	Moldova	15	12	9	13	12	13		11	
08	Iceland	11	1	8	2	3	3	8	4	7
09	Serbia	5	7	6	10	7	7	4	1	12
10	Georgia	16	16	14	16	13	16		14	
11	Albania	6	8	3	8	5	6	5	3	8
12	Portugal	2	3	11	7	1	2	10	2	10
13	Bulgaria	1	2	1	1	2	1	12	8	3
14	Finland	10	4	5	4	4	5	6	5	6
15	Latvia	14	13	2	12	11	11		15	
16	Switzerland									
17	Denmark	13	10	16	11	15	14		6	5

Detailed voting results from Switzerland (Final)
R/O	Country	Jury							Televote	
R/O	Country	Juror A	Juror B	Juror C	Juror D	Juror E	Rank	Points	Rank	Points
01	Cyprus	5	9	18	14	21	13		20	
02	Albania	10	14	6	10	13	11		4	7
03	Israel	17	20	7	8	23	16		18	
04	Belgium	16	11	22	17	17	20		21	
05	Russia	21	17	2	11	6	8	3	11	
06	Malta	8	5	4	7	3	5	6	12	
07	Portugal	2	3	16	6	4	4	7	3	8
08	Serbia	12	22	10	24	15	19		1	12
09	United Kingdom	22	23	19	21	19	22		25	
10	Greece	6	15	11	15	18	14		13	
11	Switzerland									
12	Iceland	15	6	21	4	5	6	5	6	5
13	Spain	18	19	13	20	16	21		17	
14	Moldova	24	24	17	25	24	24		23	
15	Germany	25	18	20	22	22	23		14	
16	Finland	11	7	9	5	9	10	1	7	4
17	Bulgaria	1	4	5	3	7	2	10	16	
18	Lithuania	7	8	3	13	14	7	4	10	1
19	Ukraine	23	21	15	9	12	17		9	2
20	France	3	2	8	1	1	1	12	5	6
21	Azerbaijan	19	10	1	19	11	9	2	19	
22	Norway	20	25	25	23	25	25		15	
23	Netherlands	9	16	24	12	8	15		22	
24	Italy	14	1	14	2	2	3	8	2	10
25	Sweden	4	13	23	18	10	12		8	3
26	San Marino	13	12	12	16	20	18		24	
