= Israel in the Eurovision Song Contest 2021 =

- Eurovision Song Contest 2021
- Country: Israel
- Selection process: Artist: Internal selection Song: HaShir Shelanu L'Eirovizion
- Selection date: Artist: 22 March 2020; Song: 25 January 2021

Competing entry
- Song: "Set Me Free"
- Artist: Eden Alene
- Songwriters: Noam Zaltin; Ido Netzer; Amit Mordechai; Ron Carmi

Placement
- Semi-final result: Qualified (5th, 192 points)
- Final result: 17th, 93 points

Participation chronology

Israel was represented at the Eurovision Song Contest 2021 with the song "Set Me Free", written by Noam Zaltin, Ido Netzer, Amit Mordechai, and Ron Carmi, and performed by Eden Alene. The Israeli participating broadcaster, the Israeli Public Broadcasting Corporation (IPBC/Kan), internally selected Alene to compete in the contest after she was due to compete in 2020 with the song "Feker Libi" before the event's cancellation, with a national final, titled HaShir Shelanu L'Eirovizion ("Our Song for Eurovision"), held to select her entry for 2021.

== Background ==
Prior to the 2021 contest, Israel had participated in the Eurovision Song Contest forty-two times since its first entry in 1973. The country has won the contest on four occasions: in 1978 with the song "A-Ba-Ni-Bi" performed by Izhar Cohen and the Alphabeta, in 1979 with the song "Hallelujah" performed by Milk and Honey, in 1998 with the song "Diva" performed by Dana International, and in 2018 with the song "Toy" performed by Netta.

Since the introduction of the semi-finals in 2004, Israel had failed to reach the final six times. In 2005, Shiri Maimon gave the country its tenth top five result, finishing fourth. Having failed to qualify for the final for four consecutive years (2011–2014), Israel qualified for the final for the first time in five years, with Nadav Guedj finishing ninth in 2015, and the country had participated in the final every year since. Israel's fourth victory came when Netta won the 2018 contest in Lisbon with the song "Toy". The following year, when the contest was held in Tel Aviv, Kobi Marimi represented the country on home soil with the song "Home", finishing 23rd with 35 points.

== Before Eurovision ==
=== Artist selection ===
On 22 March 2020, Kan confirmed that Eden Alene would be kept as the Israeli representative for the Eurovision Song Contest 2021, and in December 2020, it was revealed that the song that Alene would represent Israel with in Rotterdam for 2021 would be selected through a national final called HaShir Shelanu L'Eirovizion ("Our Song for Eurovision").

=== HaShir Shelanu L'Eirovizion ===
On 16 September 2020, Kan opened a public song submission window for interested songwriters to apply, with a deadline set for 15 October 2020. 220 submissions were received, which were subsequently evaluated by a professional committee consisting of Ofri Gopher (Director of Kan Music Stations), Roi Dalmadigo (Editor of Kan Gimel), Tal Argaman (DJ and music editor at Kan 88), Alona Kedem (Editor of Kan 88 and Kan Gimel), Tali Katz (Head of Delegation for Israel at the Eurovision Song Contest) and Michael Weisberg (CEO of Aroma Music) that selected nine songs for the competition.

After previous reports that the national final would consist of three live shows of four songs each, it was revealed the winning song would be selected over two rounds of online voting through Kan's official website. In the first round, demo versions of the nine competing songs were released on 2 December 2020 and the public was able to vote until 13 December. The two songs with the most votes advanced to the second round, and the professional committee selected an additional song from the remaining seven to advance. In the second round, the three songs, finalised and recorded by Alene, were to be released on 18 January 2021, however, the release was brought forward to 5 January after an early publication by the newspaper Israel Hayom. The public was able to vote for their favourite song between 19 and 25 January, and the winning song was revealed during a special televised broadcast on 25 January from the Yitzhak Rabin Center in Tel Aviv, hosted by Lucy Ayoub.

First round – 2–13 December 2020
| Song | Songwriter(s) | Percentage | Place | Result |
|---|---|---|---|---|
| "Can't Stop a Hurricane" | Yahel Doron, Naama Gali, Ella Doron | 8.9% | 6 | Eliminated |
| "Coming Out" | Oren Emanuel, Talia Londoner, Ori Avni | 7.3% | 8 | Eliminated |
| "Flying" | Mati Gilad, Dor Turgeman, Iftach Even | 8.7% | 7 | Eliminated |
| "La La Love" | Yosef Bach, Gal Malka, Gil Vain | — | — | Advanced |
| "Rise Up Today" | Ariel Tuchman, Ariel Segal | 7.2% | 9 | Eliminated |
| "Set Me Free" | Noam Zaltin, Ido Netzer, Amit Mordechai, Ron Carmi | — | — | Advanced |
| "Shoulders" | Zohar Barzilai, Adi Rotem | 12.1% | 4 | Eliminated |
| "Spilling Magic" | Itay Shimoni, Nadav Aharoni | 10.4% | 5 | Eliminated |
| "Ue La La" | Niv Cohen, Meital Cohen, Noy Eisen, Aline Cohen | — | — | Advanced |

Second round – 19–25 January 2021
| Song | Percentage | Place |
|---|---|---|
| "La La Love" | 17.2% | 2 |
| "Set Me Free" | 71.3% | 1 |
| "Ue La La" | 11.5% | 3 |

== At Eurovision ==
According to Eurovision rules, all nations with the exceptions of the host country and the "Big Five" (France, Germany, Italy, Spain and the United Kingdom) are required to qualify from one of two semi-finals in order to compete in the final; the top ten countries from each semi-final progress to the final. The European Broadcasting Union (EBU) split up the competing countries into six different pots based on voting patterns from previous contests, with countries with favourable voting histories put into the same pot. For the 2021 contest, the semi-final allocation draw held for 2020 which was held on 28 January 2020, was used. Israel was placed into the first semi-final, which was held on 18 May 2021, and was scheduled to perform in the second half of the show.

=== Semi-final ===
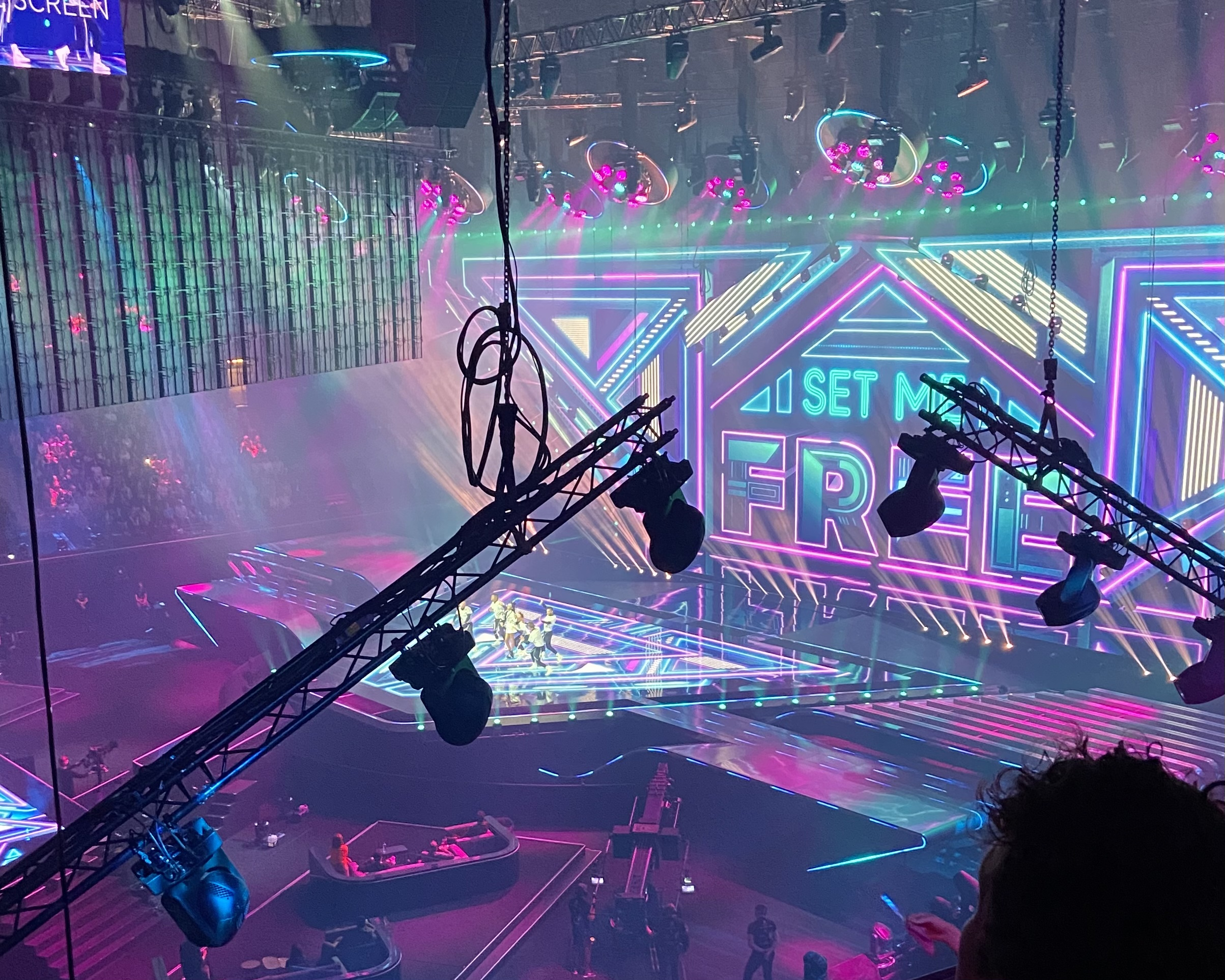
Eden Alene performing during the 1st Semi-final Jury Show

Once all the competing songs for the 2021 contest had been released, the running order for the semi-finals was decided by the shows' producers rather than through another draw, so that similar songs were not placed next to each other. Israel was set to perform in position 12, following the entry from Belgium and preceding the entry from Romania.

On May 18, the day the semi-final was held, Israel qualified for the Grand Final. During her performance, Alene hit the highest note ever sung in the Eurovision Song Contest, reaching B6 whistle note.

=== Final ===
Israel performed 3rd in the grand final on 22 May 2021, following Albania and preceding Belgium. The song has received 93 points at the close of voting, finishing 17th overall.

=== Voting ===
Voting during the three shows involved each country awarding two sets of points from 1–8, 10 and 12: one from their professional jury and the other from televoting. Each nation's jury consisted of five music industry professionals who are citizens of the country they represent, with a diversity in gender and age represented. The judges assess each entry based on the performances during the second Dress Rehearsal of each show, which takes place the night before each live show, against a set of criteria including: vocal capacity; the stage performance; the song's composition and originality; and the overall impression by the act. Jury members may only take part in panel once every three years, and are obliged to confirm that they are not connected to any of the participating acts in a way that would impact their ability to vote impartially. Jury members should also vote independently, with no discussion of their vote permitted with other jury members. The exact composition of the professional jury, and the results of each country's jury and televoting were released after the grand final; the individual results from each jury member were also released in an anonymised form.

==== Points awarded to Israel ====
Points awarded to Israel (Semi-final 1)
| Score | Televote | Jury |
|---|---|---|
| 12 points | Azerbaijan | Italy; North Macedonia |
| 10 points | Cyprus; Romania | Russia; Sweden |
| 8 points | | Australia; Netherlands; Norway |
| 7 points | Ukraine | Croatia; Lithuania |
| 6 points | Netherlands; Sweden | Ukraine |
| 5 points | Germany; Ireland; Malta; Norway | |
| 4 points | Australia; Belgium; Croatia; Russia | Belgium |
| 3 points | Italy | Germany |
| 2 points | Lithuania | Slovenia |
| 1 point | North Macedonia | Azerbaijan; Cyprus |

Points awarded to Israel (Final)
| Score | Televote | Jury |
|---|---|---|
| 12 points | Azerbaijan | |
| 10 points | | |
| 8 points | | North Macedonia; Norway |
| 7 points | | Ukraine |
| 6 points | | Poland; United Kingdom |
| 5 points | France | Croatia; France; Russia |
| 4 points | | Italy; Netherlands; Sweden |
| 3 points | | Bulgaria; Spain |
| 2 points | Cyprus | Serbia |
| 1 point | Romania | Denmark; Lithuania; Slovenia |

==== Points awarded by Israel ====
Points awarded by Israel (Semi-final 1)
| Score | Televote | Jury |
|---|---|---|
| 12 points | Russia | Lithuania |
| 10 points | Malta | Cyprus |
| 8 points | Ukraine | Malta |
| 7 points | Azerbaijan | Belgium |
| 6 points | Cyprus | Russia |
| 5 points | Lithuania | Sweden |
| 4 points | Norway | Ukraine |
| 3 points | Croatia | Slovenia |
| 2 points | Sweden | Norway |
| 1 point | Belgium | Croatia |

Points awarded by Israel (Final)
| Score | Televote | Jury |
|---|---|---|
| 12 points | Ukraine | Switzerland |
| 10 points | Russia | Lithuania |
| 8 points | France | France |
| 7 points | Italy | Russia |
| 6 points | Switzerland | Belgium |
| 5 points | Malta | Malta |
| 4 points | Finland | Ukraine |
| 3 points | Lithuania | Cyprus |
| 2 points | Azerbaijan | Azerbaijan |
| 1 point | Iceland | Bulgaria |

==== Detailed voting results ====
The following members comprised the Israeli jury:

- Noy Alooshe
- Roni Duani (Roni Superstar)
- Avia Farchi
- Yossi Hersonski
- Ohad Hitman

Detailed voting results from Israel (Semi-final 1)
| R/O | Country | Jury | | | | | | | Televote | |
| R/O | Country | Juror A | Juror B | Juror C | Juror D | Juror E | Rank | Points | Rank | Points |
|---|---|---|---|---|---|---|---|---|---|---|
| 01 | Lithuania | 2 | 4 | 1 | 1 | 1 | 1 | 12 | 6 | 5 |
| 02 | Slovenia | 14 | 6 | 10 | 11 | 8 | 8 | 3 | 15 | |
| 03 | Russia | 3 | 5 | 6 | 4 | 3 | 5 | 6 | 1 | 12 |
| 04 | Sweden | 6 | 7 | 7 | 8 | 7 | 6 | 5 | 9 | 2 |
| 05 | Australia | 7 | 13 | 12 | 15 | 9 | 13 | | 12 | |
| 06 | North Macedonia | 15 | 14 | 15 | 10 | 12 | 15 | | 14 | |
| 07 | Ireland | 12 | 10 | 14 | 6 | 11 | 11 | | 13 | |
| 08 | Cyprus | 1 | 1 | 3 | 3 | 4 | 2 | 10 | 5 | 6 |
| 09 | Norway | 13 | 15 | 8 | 9 | 6 | 9 | 2 | 7 | 4 |
| 10 | Croatia | 9 | 11 | 13 | 13 | 5 | 10 | 1 | 8 | 3 |
| 11 | Belgium | 5 | 3 | 5 | 5 | 2 | 4 | 7 | 10 | 1 |
| 12 | Israel | | | | | | | | | |
| 13 | Romania | 11 | 8 | 11 | 12 | 10 | 12 | | 11 | |
| 14 | Azerbaijan | 10 | 9 | 9 | 14 | 15 | 14 | | 4 | 7 |
| 15 | Ukraine | 8 | 12 | 4 | 7 | 13 | 7 | 4 | 3 | 8 |
| 16 | Malta | 4 | 2 | 2 | 2 | 14 | 3 | 8 | 2 | 10 |

Detailed voting results from Israel (Final)
| R/O | Country | Jury | | | | | | | Televote | |
| R/O | Country | Juror A | Juror B | Juror C | Juror D | Juror E | Rank | Points | Rank | Points |
|---|---|---|---|---|---|---|---|---|---|---|
| 01 | Cyprus | 8 | 6 | 11 | 8 | 9 | 8 | 3 | 12 | |
| 02 | Albania | 13 | 24 | 23 | 21 | 17 | 21 | | 23 | |
| 03 | Israel | | | | | | | | | |
| 04 | Belgium | 7 | 4 | 12 | 6 | 2 | 5 | 6 | 20 | |
| 05 | Russia | 5 | 8 | 6 | 3 | 4 | 4 | 7 | 2 | 10 |
| 06 | Malta | 9 | 3 | 4 | 5 | 11 | 6 | 5 | 6 | 5 |
| 07 | Portugal | 22 | 9 | 20 | 12 | 16 | 16 | | 19 | |
| 08 | Serbia | 19 | 20 | 22 | 19 | 20 | 22 | | 18 | |
| 09 | United Kingdom | 25 | 25 | 25 | 25 | 25 | 25 | | 25 | |
| 10 | Greece | 20 | 10 | 17 | 23 | 18 | 17 | | 15 | |
| 11 | Switzerland | 1 | 1 | 1 | 4 | 1 | 1 | 12 | 5 | 6 |
| 12 | Iceland | 10 | 12 | 7 | 13 | 12 | 11 | | 10 | 1 |
| 13 | Spain | 23 | 19 | 21 | 24 | 21 | 23 | | 24 | |
| 14 | Moldova | 11 | 21 | 18 | 9 | 10 | 14 | | 21 | |
| 15 | Germany | 24 | 22 | 24 | 22 | 23 | 24 | | 14 | |
| 16 | Finland | 12 | 11 | 10 | 14 | 8 | 12 | | 7 | 4 |
| 17 | Bulgaria | 15 | 5 | 16 | 20 | 6 | 10 | 1 | 17 | |
| 18 | Lithuania | 6 | 2 | 3 | 1 | 3 | 2 | 10 | 8 | 3 |
| 19 | Ukraine | 2 | 14 | 5 | 10 | 13 | 7 | 4 | 1 | 12 |
| 20 | France | 3 | 7 | 2 | 2 | 5 | 3 | 8 | 3 | 8 |
| 21 | Azerbaijan | 4 | 16 | 14 | 7 | 15 | 9 | 2 | 9 | 2 |
| 22 | Norway | 21 | 17 | 15 | 15 | 14 | 19 | | 11 | |
| 23 | Netherlands | 18 | 13 | 13 | 17 | 22 | 18 | | 22 | |
| 24 | Italy | 17 | 18 | 8 | 11 | 19 | 15 | | 4 | 7 |
| 25 | Sweden | 14 | 23 | 9 | 16 | 7 | 13 | | 13 | |
| 26 | San Marino | 16 | 15 | 19 | 18 | 24 | 20 | | 16 | |
