= Belgium in the Eurovision Song Contest 2021 =

- Eurovision Song Contest 2021
- Participating broadcaster: Vlaamse Radio- en Televisieomroeporganisatie (VRT)
- Country: Belgium
- Selection process: Internal selection
- Announcement date: Artist: 20 March 2020; Song: 4 March 2021

Competing entry
- Song: "The Wrong Place"
- Artist: Hooverphonic
- Songwriters: Alex Callier; Charlotte Foret

Placement
- Semi-final result: Qualified (9th, 117 points)
- Final result: 19th, 74 points

Participation chronology

Belgium was represented at the Eurovision Song Contest 2021 with the song "The Wrong Place", written by Alex Callier and Charlotte Foret, and performed by the band Hooverphonic. The Belgian participating broadcaster, Flemish Vlaamse Radio- en Televisieomroeporganisatie (VRT), internally selected its entry for the contest. Hooverphonic were due to compete in the 2020 contest with "Release Me" before the event's cancellation. "The Wrong Place" was presented to the public on 4 March 2021.

Belgium was drawn to compete in the first semi-final of the Eurovision Song Contest which took place on 18 May 2021. Performing during the show in position 11, "The Wrong Place" was announced among the top 10 entries of the first semi-final and therefore qualified to compete in the final on 22 May. It was later revealed that Belgium placed ninth out of the 16 participating countries in the semi-final with 117 points. In the final, Belgium performed in position 4 and placed nineteenth out of the 26 participating countries, scoring 74 points.

== Background ==
Prior to the 2021 contest, Belgium had participated in the Eurovision Song Contest sixty-one times since its debut as one of seven countries to take part in 1956. Since then, they have won the contest on one occasion in 1986 with the song "J'aime la vie", performed by Sandra Kim. Following the introduction of semi-finals for the 2004 contest, Belgium had been featured in only six finals. In 2019, "Wake Up" by Eliot placed thirteenth in the first semi-final and failed to advance to the final.

The Belgian participation in the contest alternates between two broadcasters: Flemish Vlaamse Radio- en Televisieomroeporganisatie (VRT) and Walloon Radio-télévision belge de la Communauté française (RTBF) at the time, with both broadcasters sharing the broadcasting rights. Both broadcasters –and their predecessors– had selected the Belgian entry using national finals and internal selections in the past. In 2019 and 2020, both RTBF and VRT internally selected their respective entries. As the 2020 contest was cancelled, RTBF allowed VRT to enter the contest for a second year in a row. On 20 March 2020, VRT confirmed its participation in the 2021 contest and continued the internal selection procedure.

== Before Eurovision ==
=== Internal selection ===
The Belgian entry for the 2021 Eurovision Song Contest was selected via an internal selection by VRT. On 20 March 2020, both broadcasters confirmed that the band Hooverphonic would remain as Belgium's representative for the contest. On 9 November 2020, it was announced that Geike Arnaert would return as the lead singer of the band, replacing Luka Cruysberghs; Arnaert had previously been the lead singer between 1997 and 2008, while Cruysberghs acted in such a role since 2018.

The song Hooverphonic would perform at the contest, "The Wrong Place", was presented to the public on 4 March 2021 during the radio MNM programme De Grote Peter Van de Veire Ochtendshow. The song was written by member of the band, Alex Callier, along with Charlotte Foret, and was selected from two songs shortlisted among 25 that were in the running in December 2020. The music video for the song, directed by Jan Boon, was released on the same day of the presentation.

== At Eurovision ==
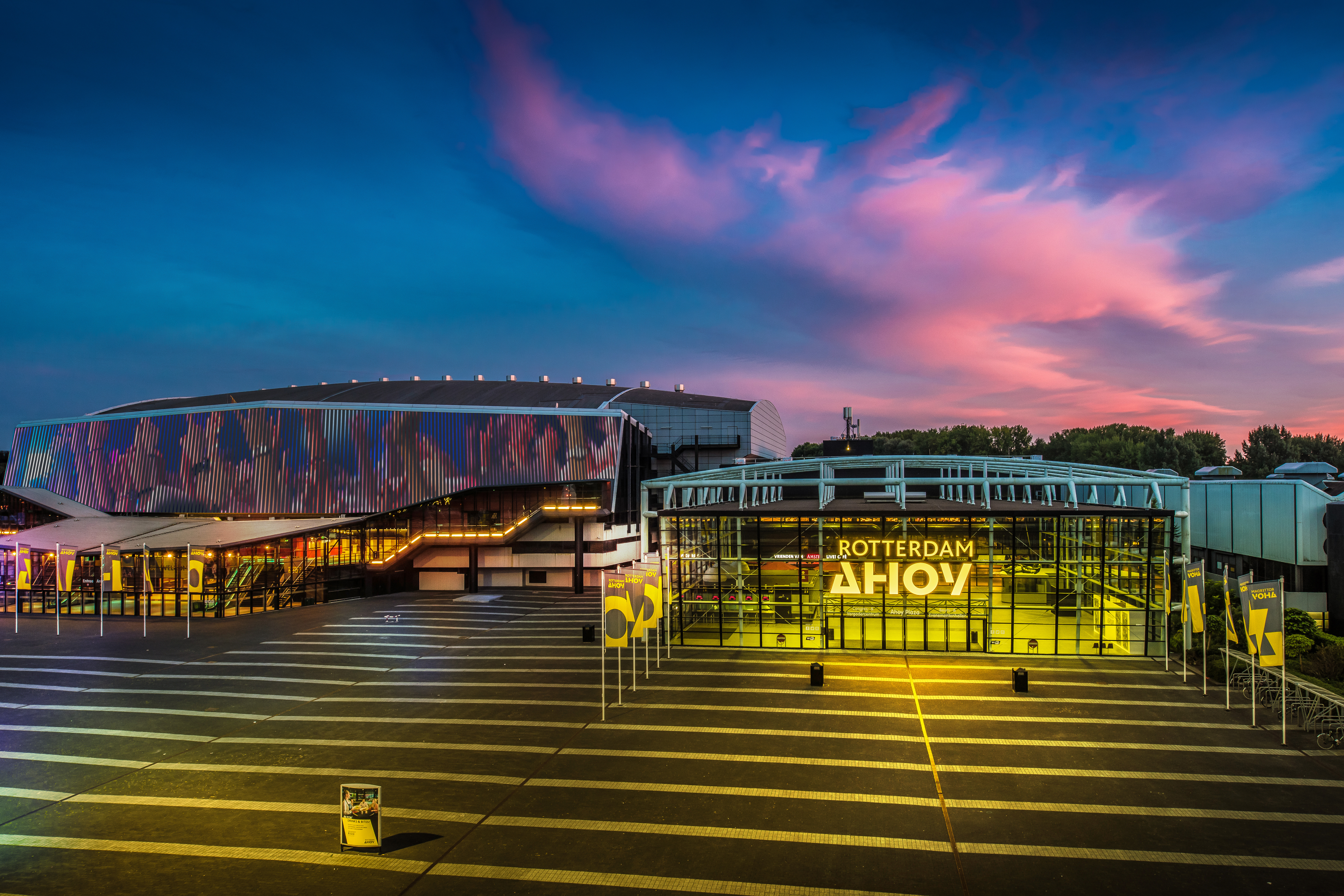
The Eurovision Song Contest 2021 took place at the Rotterdam Ahoy in Rotterdam, Netherlands

According to Eurovision rules, all nations with the exceptions of the host country and the "Big Five" (France, Germany, Italy, Spain and the United Kingdom) are required to qualify from one of two semi-finals in order to compete for the final; the top ten countries from each semi-final progress to the final. The European Broadcasting Union (EBU) split up the competing countries into six different pots based on voting patterns from previous contests, with countries with favourable voting histories put into the same pot. The semi-final allocation draw held for the Eurovision Song Contest 2020 on 28 January 2020 was used for the 2021 contest, which Belgium was placed into the first semi-final, which was held on 18 May 2021, and was scheduled to perform in the second half of the show.

Once all the competing songs for the 2021 contest had been released, the running order for the semi-finals was decided by the shows' producers rather than through another draw, so that similar songs were not placed next to each other. Belgium was set to perform in position 11, following the entry from Croatia and preceding the entry from Israel.

The two semi-finals and the final was broadcast in Belgium by both the Flemish and Walloon broadcasters. VRT broadcast the shows on één and Ketnet with commentary in Dutch by Peter Van de Veire. RTBF televised the shows on La Une with commentary in French by Jean-Louis Lahaye and Fanny Jandrain; the second semi-final aired on a 90-minute delay on La Une. Jandrain replaced Maureen Louys as a commentator after she was absent due to testing positive for COVID-19. The first semi-final and the final was also broadcast by RTBF on VivaCité with commentary in French by Lahaye and Jandrain, while VRT also broadcast the final on Radio 2 with commentary in Dutch by Anja Daems and Showbizz Bart. The Belgian spokesperson, who announced the top 12-point score awarded by the Belgian jury during the final, was Danira Boukhriss.

=== Semi-final ===
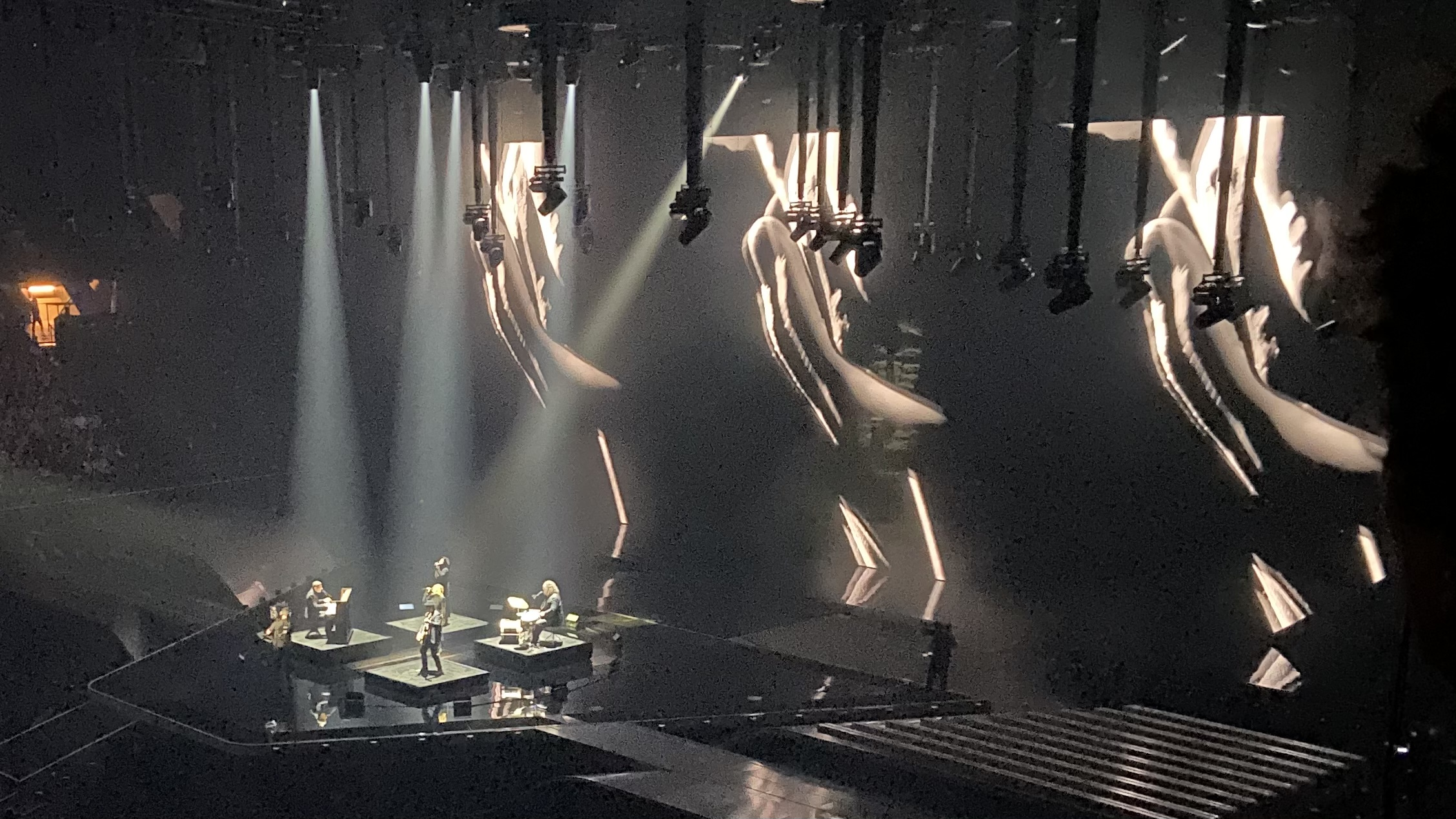
Hooverphonic during a rehearsal before the first semi-final

Hooverphonic took part in technical rehearsals on 9 and 12 May, followed by dress rehearsals on 17 and 18 May. This included the jury show on 17 May where the professional juries of each country watched and voted on the competing entries.

The Belgian performance featured the members of Hooverphonic dressed in black outfits and performing on stage together with a backing vocalist and a drummer. The group's lead singer Geike Arnaert was in the middle of the stage and the other performers were each on a platform around her. The stage was dark with strobes of white light and the LED screens displayed close-ups and shots of Arnaert's face. The Belgian performance was directed by Hans Pannecoucke. The backing vocalist that joined Hooverphonic during the performance was Monique Harcum, while the drummer was Arnout Hellofs.

At the end of the show, Belgium was announced as having finished in the top 10 and subsequently qualifying for the grand final. It was later revealed that Belgium placed ninth in the semi-final, receiving a total of 117 points: 47 points from the televoting and 70 points from the juries.

=== Final ===
Shortly after the first semi-final, a winners' press conference was held for the ten qualifying countries. As part of this press conference, the qualifying artists took part in a draw to determine which half of the grand final they would subsequently participate in. This draw was done in the order the countries were announced during the semi-final. Belgium was drawn to compete in the first half. Following this draw, the shows' producers decided upon the running order of the final, as they had done for the semi-finals. Belgium was subsequently placed to perform in position 4, following the entry from Israel and before the entry from Russia.

Hooverphonic once again took part in dress rehearsals on 21 and 22 May before the final, including the jury final where the professional juries cast their final votes before the live show. The band performed a repeat of their semi-final performance during the final on 22 May. Belgium placed nineteenth in the final, scoring 74 points: 3 points from the televoting and 71 points from the juries.

=== Voting ===
Voting during the three shows involved each country awarding two sets of points from 1–8, 10 and 12: one from their professional jury and the other from televoting. Each nation's jury consisted of five music industry professionals who are citizens of the country they represent, with a diversity in gender and age represented. The judges assess each entry based on the performances during the second Dress Rehearsal of each show, which takes place the night before each live show, against a set of criteria including: vocal capacity; the stage performance; the song's composition and originality; and the overall impression by the act. Jury members may only take part in panel once every three years, and are obliged to confirm that they are not connected to any of the participating acts in a way that would impact their ability to vote impartially. Jury members should also vote independently, with no discussion of their vote permitted with other jury members. The exact composition of the professional jury, and the results of each country's jury and televoting were released after the grand final; the individual results from each jury member were also released in an anonymised form.

Below is a breakdown of points awarded to Belgium and awarded by Belgium in the first semi-final and grand final of the contest, and the breakdown of the jury voting and televoting conducted during the two shows:

==== Points awarded to Belgium ====
Points awarded to Belgium (Semi-final 1)
Score	Televote	Jury
12 points		
10 points	Lithuania	Italy; Lithuania; Netherlands; Ukraine
8 points		
7 points	Netherlands	Israel
6 points		Russia
5 points	Sweden; Ukraine	Slovenia
4 points	Italy; Slovenia	Croatia; Cyprus
3 points	Germany; Russia	
2 points	North Macedonia; Norway	Azerbaijan; Sweden
1 point	Israel; Romania	

Points awarded to Belgium (Final)
Score	Televote	Jury
12 points		
10 points		
8 points		
7 points		Lithuania
6 points		France; Israel; Netherlands; Slovenia; Ukraine
5 points		Italy; Portugal
4 points		Cyprus
3 points		Azerbaijan; Czech Republic; Greece; Ireland; Poland; Russia
2 points	Lithuania	
1 point	Ukraine	Sweden; United Kingdom

==== Points awarded by Belgium ====
Points awarded by Belgium (Semi-final 1)
Score	Televote	Jury
12 points	Malta	Russia
10 points	Ukraine	Ukraine
8 points	Lithuania	Malta
7 points	Sweden	Norway
6 points	Norway	Sweden
5 points	Azerbaijan	Romania
4 points	Israel	Israel
3 points	Cyprus	Ireland
2 points	Russia	Lithuania
1 point	Romania	Croatia

Points awarded by Belgium (Final)
Score	Televote	Jury
12 points	France	Switzerland
10 points	Ukraine	Ukraine
8 points	Italy	Finland
7 points	Lithuania	Russia
6 points	Finland	Bulgaria
5 points	Iceland	Malta
4 points	Switzerland	Sweden
3 points	Sweden	Iceland
2 points	Malta	Italy
1 point	Norway	Portugal

==== Detailed voting results ====
The following members comprised the Belgian jury:

- Lien De Greef (Lady Linn)
- Stefaan Fernande
- Yves Ruth
- Pommelien Thijs
- Katrien Verbeeck (Kate Ryan)

Detailed voting results from Belgium (Semi-final 1)
R/O	Country	Jury							Televote	
R/O	Country	Juror A	Juror B	Juror C	Juror D	Juror E	Rank	Points	Rank	Points
01	Lithuania	9	11	10	6	8	9	2	3	8
02	Slovenia	12	10	13	9	10	12		14	
03	Russia	2	2	1	2	1	1	12	9	2
04	Sweden	10	3	6	10	4	5	6	4	7
05	Australia	7	15	7	12	7	11		15	
06	North Macedonia	11	14	15	13	15	15		13	
07	Ireland	13	8	9	4	11	8	3	12	
08	Cyprus	8	12	12	15	13	13		8	3
09	Norway	4	6	5	3	3	4	7	5	6
10	Croatia	6	7	11	14	9	10	1	11	
11	Belgium									
12	Israel	5	9	4	7	12	7	4	7	4
13	Romania	15	5	8	5	5	6	5	10	1
14	Azerbaijan	14	13	14	11	14	14		6	5
15	Ukraine	1	4	3	1	2	2	10	2	10
16	Malta	3	1	2	8	6	3	8	1	12

Detailed voting results from Belgium (Final)
R/O	Country	Jury							Televote	
R/O	Country	Juror A	Juror B	Juror C	Juror D	Juror E	Rank	Points	Rank	Points
01	Cyprus	14	19	18	11	12	17		17	
02	Albania	18	21	23	20	22	20		15	
03	Israel	10	17	10	18	16	16		19	
04	Belgium									
05	Russia	3	3	2	7	3	4	7	16	
06	Malta	5	5	3	12	14	6	5	9	2
07	Portugal	12	12	9	13	8	10	1	11	
08	Serbia	24	18	19	22	21	19		22	
09	United Kingdom	21	20	21	21	20	21		25	
10	Greece	20	16	15	15	17	18		12	
11	Switzerland	2	1	1	3	1	1	12	7	4
12	Iceland	4	7	11	5	11	8	3	6	5
13	Spain	13	8	17	16	9	12		21	
14	Moldova	25	25	25	24	24	25		24	
15	Germany	23	24	24	23	25	24		20	
16	Finland	6	4	5	1	2	3	8	5	6
17	Bulgaria	7	11	4	4	4	5	6	14	
18	Lithuania	9	14	14	14	10	13		4	7
19	Ukraine	1	2	6	2	6	2	10	2	10
20	France	15	9	12	17	15	15		1	12
21	Azerbaijan	22	23	20	25	19	23		13	
22	Norway	16	13	13	9	13	14		10	1
23	Netherlands	11	10	8	10	18	11		18	
24	Italy	17	15	16	6	7	9	2	3	8
25	Sweden	8	6	7	8	5	7	4	8	3
26	San Marino	19	22	22	19	23	22		23	
