= Iceland in the Eurovision Song Contest 2021 =

- Eurovision Song Contest 2021
- Participating broadcaster: Ríkisútvarpið (RÚV)
- Country: Iceland
- Selection process: Internal selection
- Announcement date: Artist: 23 October 2020; Song: 13 March 2021

Competing entry
- Song: "10 Years"
- Artist: Daði og Gagnamagnið
- Songwriters: Daði Freyr Pétursson

Placement
- Semi-final result: Qualified (2nd, 288 points)
- Final result: 4th, 378 points

Participation chronology

Iceland was represented at the Eurovision Song Contest 2021 with the song "10 Years", written by Daði Freyr Pétursson and performed by Daði og Gagnamagnið. The Icelandic participating broadcaster, Ríkisútvarpið (RÚV), internally selected Daði og Gagnamagnið as its entrants after they were due to compete in the 2020 contest with "Think About Things" before the event's cancellation, having won the 2020 edition of the national final Söngvakeppnin. The song was also internally selected, and as such, Söngvakeppnin was not organised in 2021.

A music video for "10 Years" and a tie-in mobile game were released ahead of the contest to promote the entry. A COVID-19 infection among the members of Daði og Gagnamagnið prevented the group from performing "10 Years" live, though they remained in the competition by using rehearsal footage recorded in the contest's venue prior to the event. Iceland placed second out of 17 competing countries with 288 points in the second semi-final, held on 20 May 2021, and qualified for the final held two days later, where the nation placed fourth out of 26 competing countries with 378 points.

== Background ==
Prior to the 2021 contest, Iceland had participated in the Eurovision Song Contest 32 times following its first entry in 1986 and had failed to participate on only two occasions since their debut. The contest has been broadcast in Iceland since as early as 1970, but the geographically-remote nation was prevented from competing until a stable satellite connection could be established to enable live transmission of it. Iceland had never won the contest ahead of the 2021 event, but had previously achieved two second place finishes, in 1999 with the song "All Out of Luck" performed by Selma and in 2009 with the song "Is It True?" performed by Yohanna. Following the introduction of semi-finals for the 2004 contest, Iceland's entries appeared in the final on nine occasions. In 2018, Iceland marked their fourth consecutive non-qualification when Ari Ólafsson and the song "Our Choice" placed 19th and last in the first semi-final, standing as the country's worst result at the contest. Iceland made its return to the final in 2019, with Hatari and the song "Hatrið mun sigra" placing 10th with 232 points and bringing the nation back into the top 10 for the first time since 2009.

The Icelandic national broadcaster, Ríkisútvarpið (RÚV), broadcasts the event within Iceland and organises the selection process for the nation's entry. The Icelandic broadcaster has used various methods to select the Icelandic entry in the past, such as internal selections and televised national finals to choose the performer and song to compete at Eurovision. Since 2006, RÚV has chosen its entry for Eurovision through Söngvakeppnin, a televised music competition; this method was used ahead of the 2020 contest, the winner of Söngvakeppnin 2020 being Daði og Gagnamagnið with the song "Think About Things". The 2020 contest was subsequently cancelled due to the rapid spread across Europe of the coronavirus disease 2019 (COVID-19); shortly afterwards the European Broadcasting Union (EBU) confirmed that entries for the 2020 contest would not be eligible for the next edition in 2021. In September 2020, RÚV confirmed its intention to participate in the 2021 contest, subsequently announcing on 23 October 2020 that Daði og Gagnamagnið would remain as the nation's Eurovision entrant.

== Before Eurovision ==
=== Internal selection ===
Concurrently with confirming that Daði og Gagnamagnið would represent Iceland in the 2021 contest, RÚV announced that their song for the contest would also be chosen internally, meaning that for the first time since 2005, Iceland's traditional national selection process Söngvakeppnin would not be held. The announcement came soon after Daði Freyr announced changes to his already-confirmed European tour in 2020 and 2021, with many dates shifted due to the ongoing COVID-19 pandemic, including changes for the May 2021 dates that would allow him to perform at Eurovision. In an interview with NME in November 2020, Daði shared the process for writing his new Eurovision entry, stating that from around 11 rough demos he had been working on, he would subsequently focus on one for the contest. By the end of December 2020, Daði confirmed through his Twitter account that the lyrics for the entry had been completed.

In January 2021, Daði announced a campaign for submissions from the general public to be part of a virtual backing choir which would be utilised in his entry for Eurovision. This followed changes to the Eurovision Song Contest rules which for the first time allowed the use of pre-recorded backing vocals. Interested individuals were invited to submit audio files of themselves performing one of seven vocal parts which would make up the backing choir. Within two days around 250 samples had been submitted for the choir, including one from Jendrik Sigwart, who was later selected to represent Germany in the same contest.

On 24 February 2021, Daði revealed that his entry for Eurovision 2021 would be entitled "10 Years", slated for release on 13 March 2021. At the same time, he stated that the song would reference his decade-long relationship with his wife Árný Fjóla. Ahead of the song's release, RÚV aired a two-part documentary series on 27 February and 6 March 2021, detailing the history of the singer, Daði og Gagnamagnið and their journey to Eurovision 2021. "10 Years" received its first official performance on a special Eurovision edition of RÚV's Straumar on 13 March; however, the song was leaked online two days prior to the show.

=== Promotion ===
To promote the entry, a music video for "10 Years" was released on 29 March 2021. Directed by Guðný Rós Þórhallsdóttir, the video features Icelandic actor Ólafur Darri Ólafsson and portrays Daði og Gagnamagnið as superheroes saving Reykjavík from monsters. Ahead of the contest, Daði Freyr also confirmed that "10 Years" was likely to be the group's last song together, as they were originally envisioned as a temporary lineup for Daði's Söngvakeppnin performances.

Daði og Gagnamagnið also released a mobile game in the run-up to the contest. Titled Think About Aliens and inspired by 16-bit era games, the game was developed by Icelandic game developers Byssuthur and was released on Android and iOS operating systems. Featuring music by Daði Freyr, including "10 Years" and his previous Söngvakeppnin entries "Is This Love?" and "Think About Things", the player controls a representation of Daði as he attempts to save the members of the group who have been abducted by music-hating aliens.

== At Eurovision ==
The Eurovision Song Contest 2021 took place at Rotterdam Ahoy in Rotterdam, the Netherlands, and consisted of two semi-finals held on the respective dates of 18 and 20 May, and the final on 22 May 2021. According to Eurovision rules, all nations with the exceptions of the host country and the "Big Five" (France, Germany, Italy, Spain and the United Kingdom) are required to qualify from one of two semi-finals in order to compete for the final; the top 10 countries from each semi-final progress to the final. The EBU split up the competing countries into six different pots based on voting patterns from previous contests as determined by the contest's televoting partner Digame. The semi-final allocation draw held for the Eurovision Song Contest 2020 on 28 January 2020 was used for the 2021 contest, which placed Iceland into the second semi-final, to be held on 20 May, scheduled to perform in the first half of the show. Once all the competing songs for the 2021 contest had been released, the running order for the semi-finals was decided by the shows' producers rather than through another draw, so that similar songs were not placed next to each other. Iceland was set to perform in eighth, following the entry from Moldova and preceding the entry from Serbia.

The two semi-finals and the final were televised in Iceland on RÚV with commentary by Gísli Marteinn Baldursson; on RÚV 2 with Icelandic Sign Language provided by Elsa G. Björnsdóttir; and streamed online on ruv.is with English commentary by Alex Elliott. The second semi-final and the final were also broadcast via radio on Rás 2.

=== Performances ===
The Icelandic delegation took park in technical rehearsals at Rotterdam Ahoy on 10 and 13 May 2021. The performance featured Daði og Gagnamagnið in matching turquoise-green sweaters emblazoned with pixellated versions of each individual member's face; half of the group, including Daði Freyr, performed in front of microphone stands, while the other half performed with curved keytars. On 16 May 2021, a positive COVID-19 test was detected for one member of the Icelandic delegation as part of routine testing organised by the contest organisers; subsequently this meant that the entire Icelandic delegation were placed into self-isolation and underwent further PCR testing, and were forced to miss the "Turquoise Carpet" welcome event held on 16 May. On 19 May 2021, following further tests, the EBU and RÚV announced that Daði og Gagnamagnið Jóhann Sigurður Jóhannsson had subsequently tested positive for COVID-19, with all other delegation members testing negative; as such the group did not perform in dress rehearsals on 19 and 20 May, and were unable to perform live during the second semi-final, as they wished to only appear if all members could participate. However the song remained in the competition, with footage from their second technical rehearsal on 13 May 2021 being utilised during the semi-final as Daði og Gagnamagnið watched the show from their hotel room.

The contest's second semi-final was held on 20 May 2021 and Iceland was the sixth country of the ten to be announced as having qualified for the final. It was later revealed that the entry placed second in the semi-final, receiving a total of 288 points. Soon after, the EBU posted the running order for the final, placing Iceland in position 12, following Switzerland and preceding Spain. The group's rehearsal footage was utilised again in the final, held on 22 May 2021; at the close of voting "10 Years" placed 4th in the field of 26, receiving 378 points.

=== Voting ===
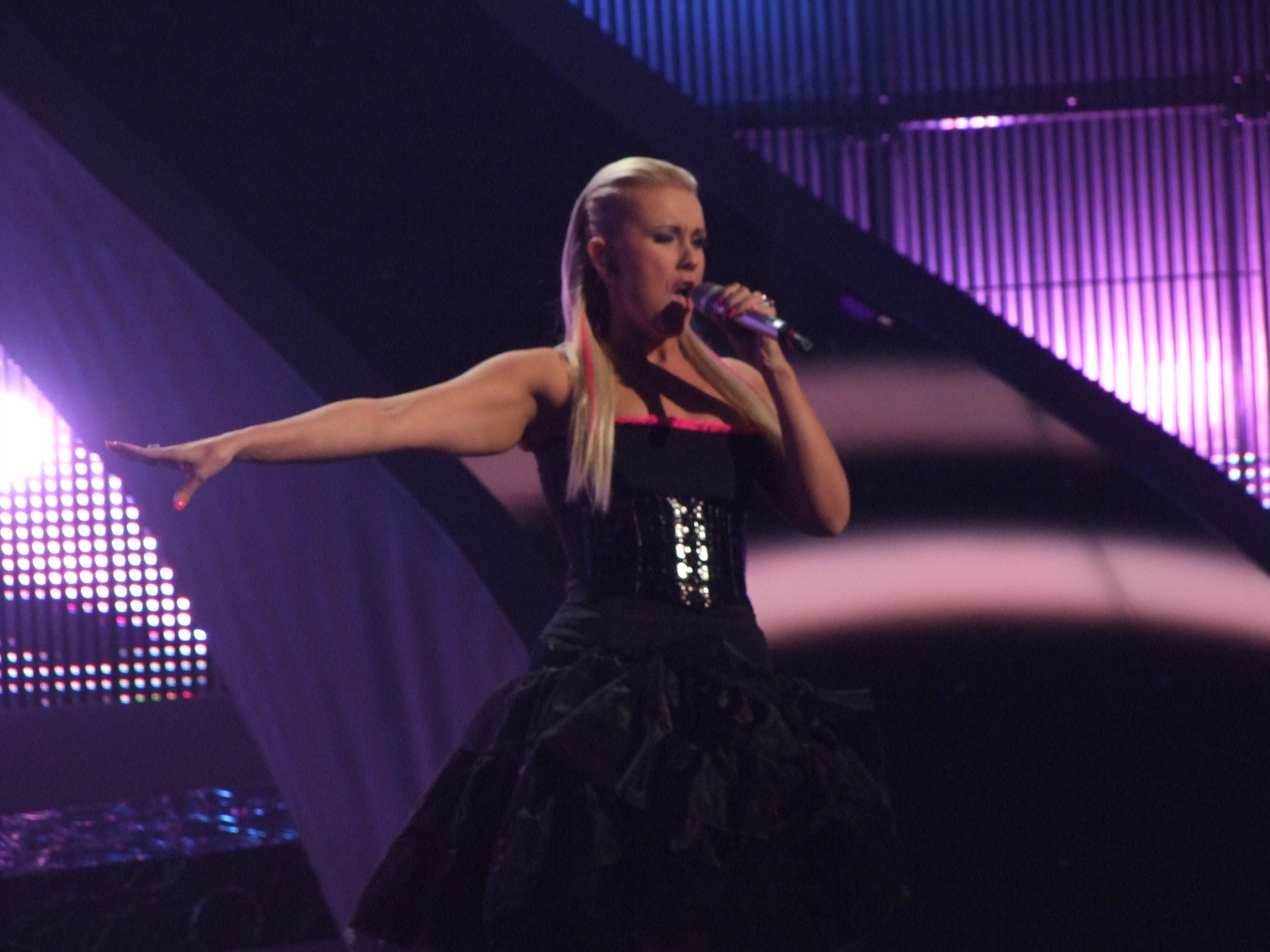
Regína Ósk, who represented Iceland in the 2008 contest as a member of Eurobandið, sat on the Icelandic jury.

Below is a breakdown of points awarded to Iceland in the second semi-final, as well as by the country in the final. Voting during the three shows involved each country awarding two sets of points from 1–8, 10 and 12: one from their professional jury and the other from televoting. The exact composition of the professional jury and the results of each country's jury and televoting were released after the final; the individual results from each jury member were also released in an anonymised form. Iceland's jury consisted of Gudrun Gunnars, Matti Matt, Oddny Sturludottir, Regína Ósk and Snorri Helgason. In the second semi-final, Iceland placed 2nd with a total of 288 points, thus qualifying for the final. The performance received 148 televoting points, which included the maximum 12 awarded by Denmark, Finland and the United Kingdom. The jury points added to 140, including 12 from Latvia, Serbia and the United Kingdom again. In the final, Iceland placed 4th with 378 points, receiving 180 televoting points and 198 jury points, and gaining a total of four maximum 12 points scores, from the Austrian jury and the Australian, Danish and Finnish public. Over the course of the contest, the Icelandic jury awarded its 12 points to Switzerland in both the second semi-final and the final, and the Icelandic public awarded its 12 points to Denmark in the semi-final and to Finland in the final. Hannes Óli Ágústsson served as Iceland's spokesperson for the voting portion of the final, announcing the country's jury votes. The Icelandic actor announced the points in character as Olaf Yohansson, also known as the "Ja Ja Ding Dong Guy", from the film Eurovision Song Contest: The Story of Fire Saga (2020).

==== Points awarded to Iceland ====
Points awarded to Iceland (Semi-final 2)
Score	Televote	Jury
12 points	Denmark; Finland; United Kingdom	Latvia; Serbia; United Kingdom
10 points	Austria; Czech Republic; Poland	Austria; Czech Republic; Portugal
8 points	San Marino; Spain	Denmark; Estonia; Finland; Spain; Switzerland
7 points	Estonia; Georgia; Latvia; Portugal; Serbia; Switzerland	Georgia; Greece
6 points	Bulgaria; France; Moldova	France; Moldova
5 points	Greece	
4 points		Albania
3 points		Poland
2 points		
1 point	Albania	San Marino

Points awarded to Iceland (Final)
Score	Televote	Jury
12 points	Australia; Denmark; Finland	Austria
10 points	Austria; Ireland; Norway; Sweden; United Kingdom	Croatia; Denmark; Latvia; Netherlands; Poland; Slovenia; United Kingdom
8 points	Netherlands; Poland	Australia; Czech Republic; Estonia; Finland; Ireland; Italy; Portugal
7 points	Czech Republic	Serbia; Spain; Sweden
6 points	Germany; Italy; Ukraine	Georgia
5 points	Belgium; Latvia; Malta; Serbia; Spain; Switzerland	Moldova; Switzerland
4 points	Croatia; France	Lithuania; North Macedonia; Ukraine
3 points	Estonia; Lithuania; Portugal; Slovenia	Belgium; France; Germany
2 points		Norway
1 point	Georgia; Israel; Russia	

==== Points awarded by Iceland ====
Points awarded by Iceland (Semi-final 2)
Score	Televote	Jury
12 points	Denmark	Switzerland
10 points	Finland	Bulgaria
8 points	Portugal	Portugal
7 points	Switzerland	Greece
6 points	Moldova	Finland
5 points	Greece	Albania
4 points	Bulgaria	Austria
3 points	San Marino	San Marino
2 points	Austria	Serbia
1 point	Poland	Denmark

Points awarded by Iceland (Final)
Score	Televote	Jury
12 points	Finland	Switzerland
10 points	Sweden	Portugal
8 points	Ukraine	Bulgaria
7 points	France	Italy
6 points	Switzerland	France
5 points	Italy	Finland
4 points	Lithuania	Greece
3 points	Malta	Ukraine
2 points	Portugal	Russia
1 point	Norway	Malta

==== Detailed voting results ====
The following members comprised the Icelandic jury:

- Guðrún Gunnarsdóttir (Gudrun Gunnars)
- Snorri Helgason
- Matthías Matthíasson (Matti Matt)
- Oddný Sturludóttir
- Regína Ósk Óskarsdóttir (Regina Ósk)

Detailed voting results from Iceland (Semi-final 2)
R/O	Country	Jury							Televote	
R/O	Country	Juror A	Juror B	Juror C	Juror D	Juror E	Rank	Points	Rank	Points
01	San Marino	11	5	7	7	7	8	3	8	3
02	Estonia	13	10	15	10	9	13		14	
03	Czech Republic	15	12	14	14	13	14		11	
04	Greece	3	7	2	4	10	4	7	6	5
05	Austria	9	11	4	6	5	7	4	9	2
06	Poland	12	14	13	15	14	15		10	1
07	Moldova	14	13	9	8	12	11		5	6
08	Iceland									
09	Serbia	5	6	10	11	8	9	2	13	
10	Georgia	16	16	16	16	15	16		16	
11	Albania	10	8	8	1	6	6	5	15	
12	Portugal	8	2	6	2	3	3	8	3	8
13	Bulgaria	2	1	3	3	2	2	10	7	4
14	Finland	7	3	5	9	4	5	6	2	10
15	Latvia	6	15	12	12	16	12		12	
16	Switzerland	1	4	1	5	1	1	12	4	7
17	Denmark	4	9	11	13	11	10	1	1	12

Detailed voting results from Iceland (Final)
R/O	Country	Jury							Televote	
R/O	Country	Juror A	Juror B	Juror C	Juror D	Juror E	Rank	Points	Rank	Points
01	Cyprus	11	21	14	20	20	19		13	
02	Albania	13	20	17	5	11	11		24	
03	Israel	25	15	18	16	12	20		18	
04	Belgium	19	9	15	15	10	14		19	
05	Russia	18	7	12	4	9	9	2	11	
06	Malta	16	22	9	6	5	10	1	8	3
07	Portugal	9	1	4	3	3	2	10	9	2
08	Serbia	8	12	21	21	21	16		21	
09	United Kingdom	23	25	24	25	25	25		20	
10	Greece	4	6	3	10	18	7	4	12	
11	Switzerland	1	3	1	9	1	1	12	5	6
12	Iceland									
13	Spain	17	14	22	17	8	15		25	
14	Moldova	20	16	20	18	23	22		23	
15	Germany	22	24	25	24	24	24		17	
16	Finland	10	4	5	7	6	6	5	1	12
17	Bulgaria	3	2	6	8	2	3	8	16	
18	Lithuania	12	8	19	12	13	13		7	4
19	Ukraine	6	13	10	14	4	8	3	3	8
20	France	2	10	8	1	7	5	6	4	7
21	Azerbaijan	21	23	16	23	22	23		15	
22	Norway	24	17	11	19	16	21		10	1
23	Netherlands	7	19	23	22	19	17		22	
24	Italy	5	5	2	2	17	4	7	6	5
25	Sweden	14	11	7	11	14	12		2	10
26	San Marino	15	18	13	13	15	18		14	
