= Moldova in the Eurovision Song Contest 2021 =

- Eurovision Song Contest 2021
- Participating broadcaster: TeleRadio-Moldova (TRM)
- Country: Moldova
- Selection process: Internal selection
- Announcement date: Artist: 26 January 2021; Song: 4 March 2021

Competing entry
- Song: "Sugar"
- Artist: Natalia Gordienko
- Songwriters: Dimitris Kontopoulos; Philipp Kirkorov; Mikhail Gutseriyev; Sharon Vaughn

Placement
- Semi-final result: Qualified (7th, 179 points)
- Final result: 13th, 115 points

Participation chronology

Moldova was represented at the Eurovision Song Contest 2021 with the song "Sugar" written by Dimitris Kontopoulos, Philipp Kirkorov, Mikhail Gutseriyev and Sharon Vaughn. The song was performed by Natalia Gordienko, who was internally selected in January 2021 by the Moldovan broadcaster TeleRadio-Moldova (TRM) to represent the nation at the 2021 contest in Rotterdam, Netherlands. Songwriter Philipp Kirkorov represented Russia in the Eurovision Song Contest 1995 with the song "Kolybelnaya dlya vulkana" where he placed seventeenth, while Natalia Gordienko had previously represented Moldova in the Eurovision Song Contest in 2006 together with Arsenium and Connect-R, placing twentieth with the song "Loca", and was due to compete in the 2020 contest with "Prison". The Moldovan song, "Sugar", was presented to the public on 4 March 2021.

Moldova was drawn to compete in the second semi-final of the Eurovision Song Contest which took place on 20 May 2021. Performing during the show in position 7, "Sugar" was announced among the top 10 entries of the second semi-final and therefore qualified to compete in the final on 22 May. It was later revealed that Moldova placed seventh out of the 17 participating countries in the semi-final with 179 points. In the final, Moldova performed in position 14 and placed thirteenth out of the 26 participating countries, scoring 115 points.

== Background ==
Prior to the 2021 Contest, Moldova had participated in the Eurovision Song Contest fifteen times since its first entry in 2005. The nation's best placing in the contest was third, which it achieved in 2017 with the song "Hey, Mamma!" performed by SunStroke Project. To this point, Moldova have achieved another three top ten placings at the contest: in 2005 where "Boonika bate toba" performed by Zdob și Zdub placed sixth, in 2007 where "Fight" performed by Natalia Barbu placed tenth, and in 2018 where "My Lucky Day" performed by DoReDoS also placed tenth. In the 2019 contest, "Stay" performed by Anna Odobescu failed to qualify Moldova to compete in the final.

The Moldovan national broadcaster, TeleRadio-Moldova (TRM), broadcast the event within Moldova and organised the selection process for the nation's entry. TRM confirmed their intentions to participate at the 2021 Eurovision Song Contest on 20 October 2020. The broadcaster opted to select their entry in 2021 via an internal selection, marking the first time since 2007 that a Moldovan entry was internally selected; Moldova has selected their entry via a national selection show between 2008 and 2020.

== Before Eurovision ==
=== Internal selection ===
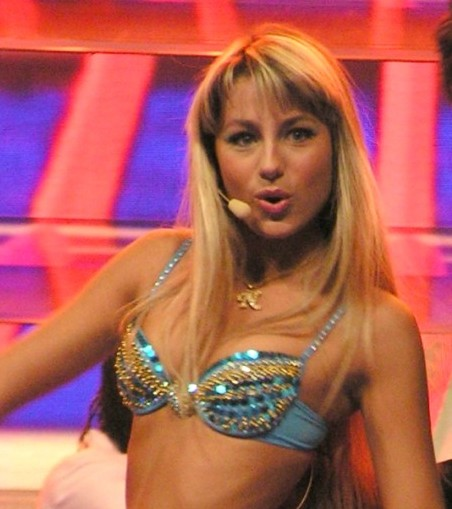
Natalia Gordienko was internally selected to represent Moldova in the Eurovision Song Contest 2021 following the cancellation of the 2020 contest

On 26 January 2021, TRM confirmed that Natalia Gordienko would remain as Moldova's representative for the Eurovision Song Contest 2021. Prior to the broadcaster's announcement, it was reported in mid-2020 that Gordienko had been working with Dimitris Kontopoulos and 1995 Russian Eurovision entrant Philipp Kirkorov in order to create her song for the 2021 contest.

The song to be performed by Natalia Gordienko, "Sugar", was presented to the public on 4 March 2021 during a live streamed event held at the Crave Theatre in Moscow, Russia. The music video, which was filmed in Kyiv, Ukraine by Katya Tsarik and directed by Fokas Evangelinos, was released on the same day. "Sugar" was written by Dimitris Kontopoulos and Philipp Kirkorov with lyrics by Mikhail Gutseriev and Sharon Vaughn.

=== Promotion ===
Natalia Gordienko made several appearances across Europe to specifically promote "Sugar" as the Moldovan Eurovision entry. On 8 March, Natalia Gordienko performed during the Russian Eurovision national final. On 22 March, Gordienko appeared and performed during the bTV late night show Shouto na Nikolaos Tsitiridis in Bulgaria, where she also recorded her 'live-on-tape' performance. A Russian language version of the song, titled "Tuz bubi", was also recorded and released prior to the contest on 9 April.

== At Eurovision ==
According to Eurovision rules, all nations with the exceptions of the host country and the "Big Five" (France, Germany, Italy, Spain and the United Kingdom) are required to qualify from one of two semi-finals in order to compete for the final; the top ten countries from each semi-final progress to the final. The European Broadcasting Union (EBU) split up the competing countries into six different pots based on voting patterns from previous contests, with countries with favourable voting histories put into the same pot. The semi-final allocation draw held for the Eurovision Song Contest 2020 on 28 January 2020 was used for the 2021 contest, which Moldova was placed into the second semi-final, to be held on 20 May 2021, and was scheduled to perform in the first half of the show.

Once all the competing songs for the 2021 contest had been released, the running order for the semi-finals was decided by the shows' producers rather than through another draw, so that similar songs were not placed next to each other. Moldova was set to perform in position 7, following the entry from Poland and preceding the entry from Iceland.

The two semi-finals and the final were televised in Moldova on Moldova 1 as well as broadcast via radio on Radio Moldova. All broadcasts featured commentary by Doina Stimpovschi. The Moldovan spokesperson, who announced the top 12-point score awarded by the Moldovan jury during the final, was 2010 and 2017 Moldova Eurovision representative (as part of SunStroke Project) Sergey Stepanov.

=== Semi-final ===
Natalia Gordienko took part in technical rehearsals on 10 and 13 May, followed by dress rehearsals on 19 and 20 May. This included the jury show on 19 May where the professional juries of each country watched and voted on the competing entries.

The Moldovan performance featured Natalia Gordienko dressed in a silver glittery dress designed by Lebanese designer Zuhair Murad and performing a choreographed routine on a white spinning platform with four dancers dressed in black blazers. The stage featured black and pink lights lighting and LED screen projections of pink lines and moving squares. During the performance, Natalia Gordienko performed a 17-second note, making it the longest note ever performed at the Eurovision Song Contest as of now. The dancers that joined Natalia Gordienko on stage are Igor Kuleshyn, Kostya Vechersky, Maxim Bondar and Slava, and Gordienko was also joined by an off-stage backing vocalist: Victoria Chalkitis.

At the end of the show, Moldova was announced as having finished in the top 10 and subsequently qualifying for the grand final. It was later revealed that Moldova placed seventh in the semi-final, receiving a total of 179 points: 123 points from the televoting and 56 points from the juries.

=== Final ===
Shortly after the second semi-final, a winners' press conference was held for the ten qualifying countries. As part of this press conference, the qualifying artists took part in a draw to determine which half of the grand final they would subsequently participate in. This draw was done in the order the countries were announced during the semi-final. Moldova was drawn to compete in the second half. Following this draw, the shows' producers decided upon the running order of the final, as they had done for the semi-finals. Moldova was subsequently placed to perform in position 14, following the entry from Spain and before the entry from Germany.

Natalia Gordienko once again took part in dress rehearsals on 21 and 22 May before the final, including the jury final where the professional juries cast their final votes before the live show. While performing a repeat of her semi-final performance during the final on 22 May, Gordienko dropped her microphone, causing one of her dancers to help her recover it and allowing the performance to continue. Moldova placed thirteenth in the final, scoring 115 points: 62 points from the televoting and 53 points from the juries.

=== Voting ===
Voting during the three shows involved each country awarding two sets of points from 1–8, 10 and 12: one from their professional jury and the other from televoting. Each nation's jury consisted of five music industry professionals who are citizens of the country they represent, with a diversity in gender and age represented. The judges assess each entry based on the performances during the second Dress Rehearsal of each show, which takes place the night before each live show, against a set of criteria including: vocal capacity; the stage performance; the song's composition and originality; and the overall impression by the act. Jury members may only take part in panel once every three years, and are obliged to confirm that they are not connected to any of the participating acts in a way that would impact their ability to vote impartially. Jury members should also vote independently, with no discussion of their vote permitted with other jury members. The exact composition of the professional jury, and the results of each country's jury and televoting were released after the grand final; the individual results from each jury member were also released in an anonymised form.

Below is a breakdown of points awarded to Moldova and awarded by Moldova in the second semi-final and grand final of the contest, and the breakdown of the jury voting and televoting conducted during the two shows:

==== Points awarded to Moldova ====
Points awarded to Moldova (Semi-final 2)
Score	Televote	Jury
12 points	Czech Republic; Estonia; France; Greece; Latvia; Portugal; San Marino; Serbia	Bulgaria; Greece
10 points		
8 points		San Marino
7 points	Poland	Poland
6 points	Austria; Iceland	
5 points	Finland	
4 points		Latvia; Serbia
3 points	Spain	Albania; United Kingdom
2 points		Austria
1 point		France

Points awarded to Moldova (Final)
Score	Televote	Jury
12 points	Czech Republic; Romania	Bulgaria; Russia
10 points		Greece
8 points	Portugal	Azerbaijan
7 points	Albania; France	
6 points	San Marino	Romania
5 points		San Marino
4 points		
3 points	Russia	
2 points	Finland; Georgia; Italy	
1 point	Azerbaijan	

==== Points awarded by Moldova ====
Points awarded by Moldova (Semi-final 2)
Score	Televote	Jury
12 points	Greece	Bulgaria
10 points	Switzerland	San Marino
8 points	Finland	Greece
7 points	Poland	Switzerland
6 points	Iceland	Iceland
5 points	Bulgaria	Albania
4 points	Portugal	Latvia
3 points	Estonia	Estonia
2 points	Albania	Portugal
1 point	Serbia	Czech Republic

Points awarded by Moldova (Final)
Score	Televote	Jury
12 points	Russia	Bulgaria
10 points	Ukraine	Russia
8 points	Italy	Greece
7 points	Greece	Malta
6 points	France	Azerbaijan
5 points	Finland	Iceland
4 points	Switzerland	France
3 points	Sweden	Switzerland
2 points	Lithuania	Portugal
1 point	Azerbaijan	Cyprus

==== Detailed voting results ====
The following members comprised the Moldovan jury:

- Ion Catar
- Nelly Ciobanu
- Marina Djundiet
- Dumitru Mitu
- Constantin Moscovici

Detailed voting results from Moldova (Semi-final 2)
R/O	Country	Jury							Televote	
R/O	Country	Juror A	Juror B	Juror C	Juror D	Juror E	Rank	Points	Rank	Points
01	San Marino	4	2	3	9	2	2	10	14	
02	Estonia	3	8	9	12	9	8	3	8	3
03	Czech Republic	13	12	7	11	3	10	1	16	
04	Greece	5	3	4	2	6	3	8	1	12
05	Austria	7	14	8	7	11	12		12	
06	Poland	11	7	6	13	8	11		4	7
07	Moldova									
08	Iceland	8	11	5	1	12	5	6	5	6
09	Serbia	9	9	12	14	14	13		10	1
10	Georgia	15	16	13	16	16	16		13	
11	Albania	6	5	10	6	4	6	5	9	2
12	Portugal	10	13	15	3	5	9	2	7	4
13	Bulgaria	1	1	1	5	1	1	12	6	5
14	Finland	14	15	16	8	13	15		3	8
15	Latvia	12	4	2	15	10	7	4	11	
16	Switzerland	2	6	14	4	7	4	7	2	10
17	Denmark	16	10	11	10	15	14		15	

Detailed voting results from Moldova (Final)
R/O	Country	Jury							Televote	
R/O	Country	Juror A	Juror B	Juror C	Juror D	Juror E	Rank	Points	Rank	Points
01	Cyprus	4	11	14	8	25	10	1	13	
02	Albania	11	12	17	13	8	14		22	
03	Israel	14	14	15	21	17	22		18	
04	Belgium	22	4	8	16	24	12		20	
05	Russia	5	3	2	4	2	2	10	1	12
06	Malta	3	13	6	2	11	4	7	14	
07	Portugal	13	10	12	6	5	9	2	16	
08	Serbia	12	15	13	19	15	17		21	
09	United Kingdom	25	16	24	17	20	24		25	
10	Greece	6	2	3	5	3	3	8	4	7
11	Switzerland	7	9	11	10	4	8	3	7	4
12	Iceland	15	18	10	1	7	6	5	11	
13	Spain	19	19	16	9	19	19		24	
14	Moldova									
15	Germany	16	20	25	11	13	20		17	
16	Finland	21	21	19	7	23	16		6	5
17	Bulgaria	2	1	1	3	1	1	12	12	
18	Lithuania	20	6	23	18	22	15		9	2
19	Ukraine	10	7	7	22	12	11		2	10
20	France	1	8	18	20	9	7	4	5	6
21	Azerbaijan	8	5	4	23	6	5	6	10	1
22	Norway	17	17	22	14	10	18		15	
23	Netherlands	23	25	21	15	14	23		23	
24	Italy	18	24	9	25	18	21		3	8
25	Sweden	24	23	20	24	21	25		8	3
26	San Marino	9	22	5	12	16	13		19	
