= San Marino in the Eurovision Song Contest 2021 =

- Eurovision Song Contest 2021
- Participating broadcaster: San Marino RTV (SMRTV)
- Country: San Marino
- Selection process: Internal selection
- Announcement date: Artist: 16 May 2020; Song: 7 March 2021

Competing entry
- Song: "Adrenalina"
- Artist: Senhit
- Songwriters: Thomas Stengaard; Joy Deb; Linnea Deb; Jimmy Thörnfeldt; Kenny Silverdique; Suzi Pancenkov; Malou Linn Eloise Ruotsalainen; Chanel Tukia; Tramar Dillard; Senhit Zadik Zadik

Placement
- Semi-final result: Qualified (9th, 118 points)
- Final result: 22nd, 50 points

Participation chronology

San Marino was represented at the Eurovision Song Contest 2021 in Rotterdam, the Netherlands. The Sammarinese broadcaster San Marino RTV (SMRTV) internally selected Senhit as their representative with the song "Adrenalina", featuring uncredited live vocals from Flo Rida. Senhit was due to compete in the 2020 contest with "Freaky!" before the event's eventual cancellation and had also served as the nation's 2011 entrant. "Adrenalina" was written and composed by Thomas Stengaard, Joy Deb, Linnea Deb, Jimmy Thörnfeldt, Kenny Silverdique, Suzi Pancenkov, Malou Linn Eloise Ruotsalainen and Chanel Tukia, along with Senhit and Flo Rida themselves. While Flo Rida had provided vocals for the track, his participation in the performance of the song on the Eurovision stage was only confirmed on the day of the second semi-final due to COVID-19-related travel restrictions.

To promote the entry, a music video for the song was released and Senhit made appearances on Polish and Albanian television as well as at a Eurovision Party in Spain in the lead up to the contest. San Marino performed first in the second semi-final of the Eurovision Song Contest 2021, held on 20 May 2021, and placed 9th, receiving 118 points. The entry qualified for the final held two days later, where the nation placed 22nd with 50 points. This marked their second-best placing to this point and their third qualification for the final.

== Background ==
Prior to the 2021 contest, San Marino had participated in the Eurovision Song Contest 10 times since their first entry in 2008. The nation's debut entry in the 2008 contest, "Complice" performed by Miodio, failed to qualify for the final and placed last in the semi-final it competed in. San Marino subsequently did not participate in both the 2009 and 2010 contests, citing financial difficulties. They returned in 2011 with Italian singer Senit performing "Stand By", which also failed to take the nation to the final. From 2012 to 2014, San Marino sent Valentina Monetta to the contest on three consecutive occasions, which made her the first singer to participate in three consecutive contests since Udo Jürgens, who competed in 1964, 1965 and 1966 for Austria. Monetta's entries in 2012 ("The Social Network Song") and 2013 ("Crisalide (Vola)") also failed to qualify San Marino to the final, however in 2014, she managed to bring the nation to the final for the first time with "Maybe", placing 24th. The nation's next four entries, "Chain of Lights" performed by Anita Simoncini and Michele Perniola for 2015, "I Didn't Know" by Serhat for 2016, "Spirit of the Night" by Monetta and Jimmie Wilson for 2017 and "Who We Are" by Jessika featuring Jenifer Brening for 2018, did not qualify for the final. San Marino's best placing up to 2021 was in the Eurovision Song Contest 2019 where Serhat appeared for his second participation and finished in 19th place in the final, singing "Say Na Na Na". The nation planned to take part in the 2020 contest with Senhit and her song "Freaky!", however, due to the COVID-19 pandemic in Europe, the contest was cancelled on 18 March 2020. Senhit later revealed that she would return to represent San Marino in the next contest in 2021.

== Before Eurovision ==
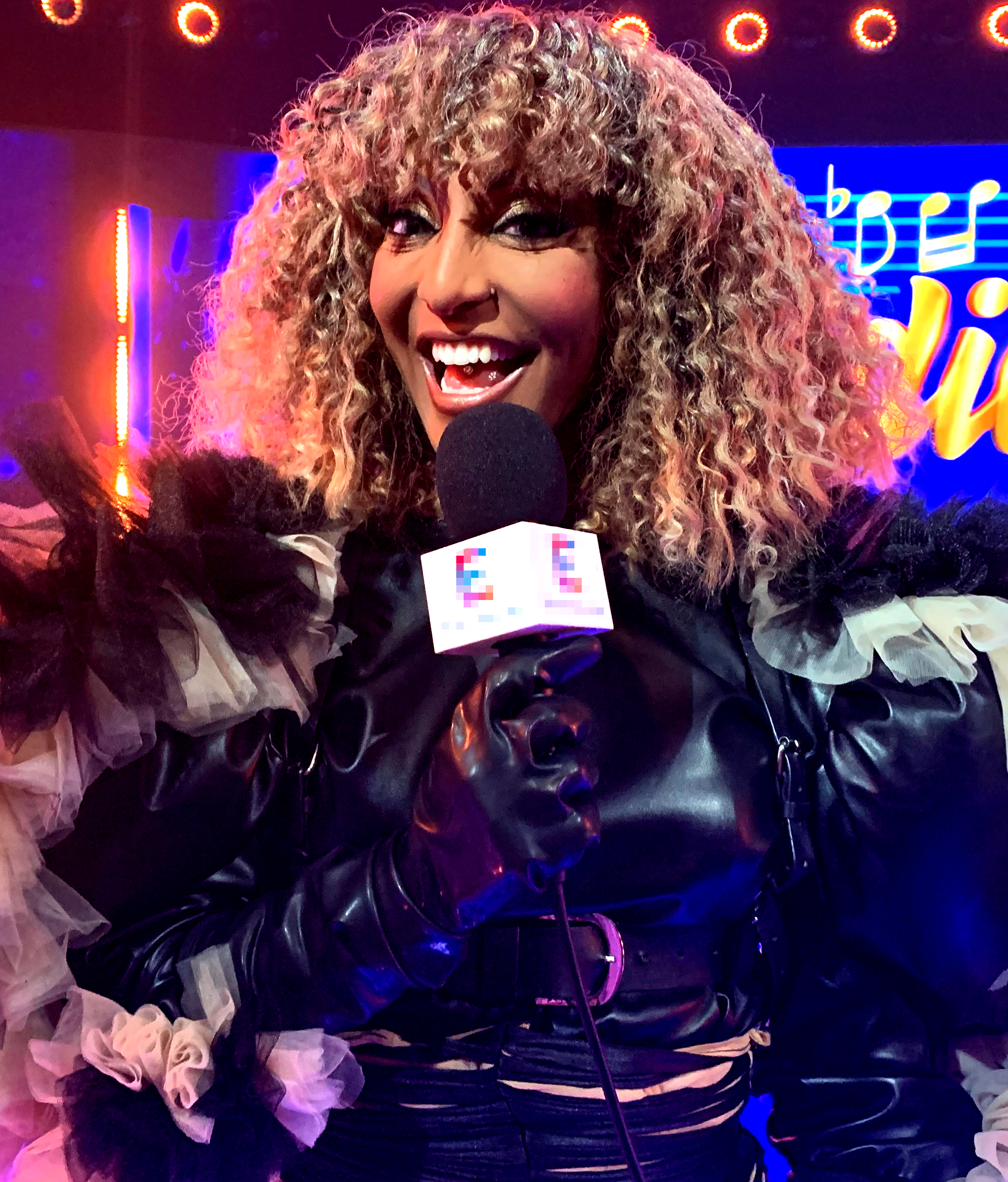
Senhit was internally selected by SMRTV to represent San Marino in the Eurovision Song Contest 2021.

=== Internal selection ===
On 16 May 2020, during the Eurovision Song Contest 2020 replacement event Eurovision: Europe Shine a Light, which showcased the entries that were set to take part in the canceled contest, Senhit announced that she would return to represent San Marino in the Eurovision Song Contest 2021. Joining her would be artistic and creative director Luca Tommassini, who also served in that role for the canceled 2020 participation. Senhit's song was originally scheduled to be revealed on 23 February 2021, however, the date was later changed to 8 March. Following a leak of the song on 7 March, "Adrenalina" was officially presented as San Marino's entry a day early. The song features vocals from American rapper Flo Rida and was written and composed by Thomas Stengaard, Joy Deb, Linnea Deb, Jimmy Thörnfeldt, Kenny Silverdique, Suzi Pancenkov, Malou Linn Eloise Ruotsalainen and Chanel Tukia, along with Senhit and Flo Rida themselves. Both Joy and Linnea Deb had previously composed Sweden's 2015 winning Eurovision entry "Heroes", while Stengaard had previously composed the winning Eurovision entry for Denmark in 2013, titled "Only Teardrops". In writing about the song's selection, San Marino's team noted that the song is of an international style featuring electropop, Latin sounds and two instruments from Eritrea: the krar and the kebero. While the song and music video both included Flo Rida, it was not decided upon the song's reveal if he would also perform on the Eurovision stage. The delegation noted that either way, Flo Rida's vocals would remain. By 11 March, a new version of the song was released, which included changes to its composition and a new bridge before the last chorus. These changes also moved Flo Rida's vocals earlier in the song and added him to the credits.

=== Promotion ===
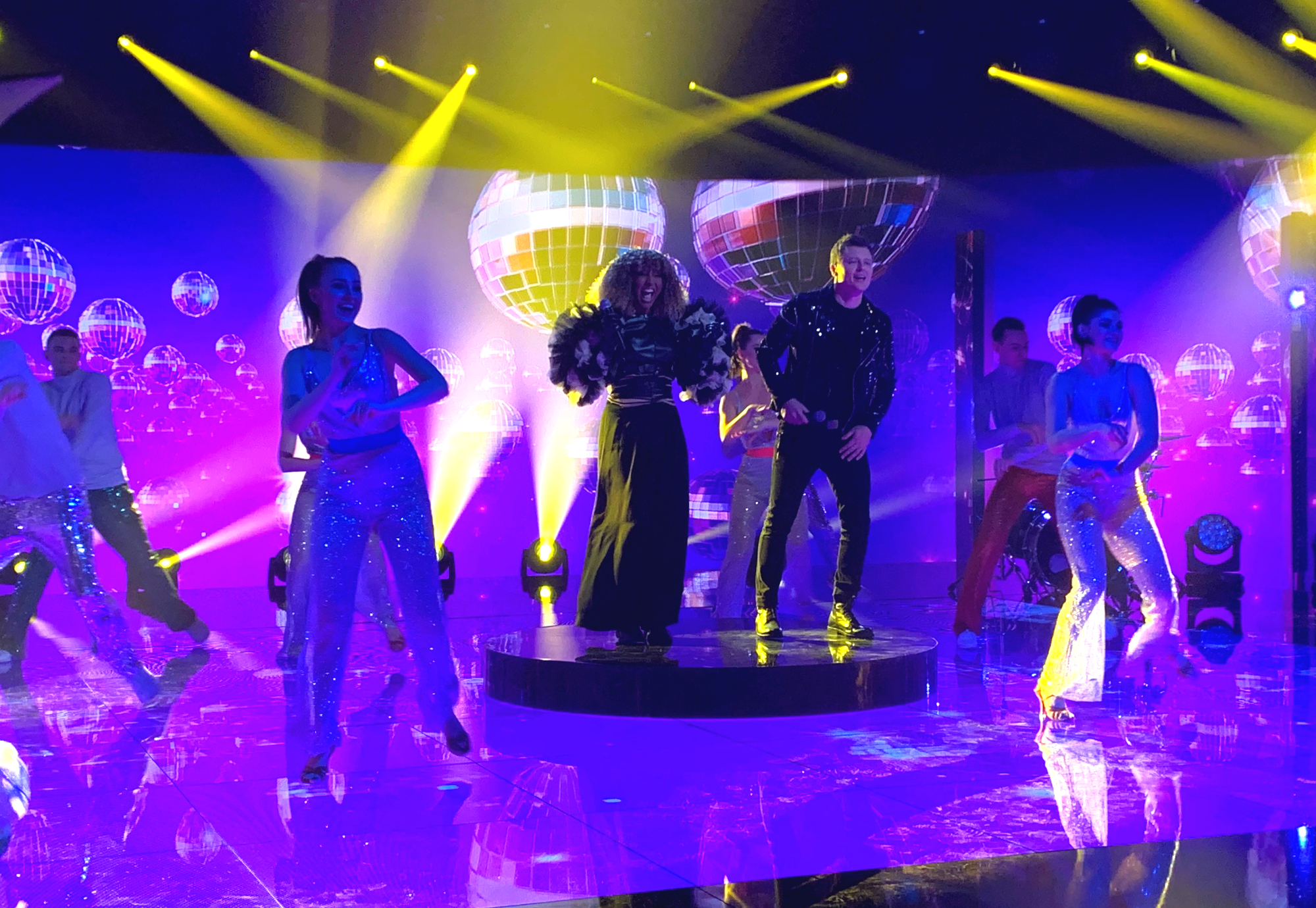
Senhit performing in Poland on the show Jaka to melodia? with Polish entrant Rafał as part of her promotional activities for "Adrenalina".

From summer 2020, Senhit and Tommassini ran a promotional campaign entitled #FreakyTripToRotterdam where Senhit covered past Eurovision songs and documented her journey to the 2021 contest. To promote "Adrenalina" specifically, a music video directed by Tomassini was released on 7 March 2021, coinciding with the song's presentation. Senhit's promotional activities for the entry saw her stopping in several countries in the lead up to the contest. In mid-April, she appeared alongside Polish Eurovision entrant Rafal on the show Jaka to melodia?, recording performances that would later air in mid-May. Later that month on 24 April, she performed "Adrenalina" at the annual PrePartyES21 event in Spain. This was followed by an appearance the next day on the Albanian show Gjysma Ime where she performed the song live.

== At Eurovision ==
The Eurovision Song Contest 2021 took place at Rotterdam Ahoy in Rotterdam, the Netherlands, and consisted of two semi-finals held on the respective dates of 18 and 20 May and the final on 22 May 2021. According to Eurovision rules, all nations with the exceptions of the host country and the "Big Five" (France, Germany, Italy, Spain and the United Kingdom) are required to qualify from one of two semi-finals to compete in the final; the top ten countries from each semi-final progress to the final. For the 2021 contest, the semi-final allocation draw held on 28 January 2020 for the previous year's canceled contest was used. The European Broadcasting Union (EBU) split up the competing countries into six different pots based on voting patterns from previous contests as determined by the contest's televoting partner Digame. San Marino was placed into the second semi-final, to be held on 20 May 2021, and was scheduled to perform in the first half of the show. Once all the competing songs for the 2021 contest had been released, the running order for the semi-finals was decided by the shows' producers rather than through another draw, so that similar songs were not placed next to each other. San Marino was set to perform in position one, preceding the entry from Estonia.

Senhit was scheduled for technical rehearsals on 10 and 13 May. Following the first technical rehearsal where a stand-in singer performed in place of Flo Rida, Senhit stated that she would not confirm nor deny Flo Rida's inclusion in the final performance. Until 18 May, the day of the first semi-final, it had still been unknown whether Flo Rida would accompany Senhit on stage for the performance. The eventual announcement of his inclusion was made upon his arrival in Rotterdam, with Senhit noting that it was difficult to predict what travel restrictions would be in place at the time of the contest.

=== Performances ===
On 20 May, Senhit and Flo Rida performed the song in position one of the second semi-final. The performance featured Senhit wearing a baroque style crown, with her and her choreographers wearing outfits designed by stylist Simone Guidarelli. At the end of the night, San Marino was announced as one of the ten countries to have qualified for the final. The qualification marked the third time the nation would make it to the final in its contest history. It was later revealed that the entry placed ninth in the semi-final, receiving a total of 118 points. Soon after, the EBU posted the running order for the final, placing San Marino in position 26th (last), following Sweden. At the close of voting for the final, held on 22 May, "Adrenalina" placed 22nd in the field of 26.

Prior to its finals performance, the jury final took place on 21 May, where the professional juries of each country watched and voted on the competing entries, an event that determines half of the vote for the final. During the performance, the platform on which the artists were positioned started rotating too late and kept moving past its scheduled stop time. This caused camera angles for viewers to be misaligned while also requiring the performers to jump to the stage from the moving platform. In a joint press release by Senhit's staff and SMRTV regarding the incident, officials stated that this technical issue posed serious safety concerns to the performers and the nation's vote was potentially compromised as juries were not necessarily informed of the incident prior to voting. In response, EBU Executive Supervisor Martin Österdahl deemed the jury vote valid for the performance and that the issue had been addressed with the highest priority.

=== Voting ===
Below is a breakdown of points awarded to San Marino in the second semi-final, as well as by the country in the final. Voting during the three shows involved each country awarding two sets of points from 1-8, 10 and 12: one from their professional jury and the other from televoting. The exact composition of the professional jury, and the results of each country's jury and televoting were released after the final; the individual results from each jury member were also released in an anonymised form. San Marino's jury consisted of Antonio Cecchetti, Elisa Manzaroli, Fabrizio Raggi, Jimmy JDKA, and Marilia Reffi. In the second semi-final, San Marino placed 9th with a total of 118 points, thus qualifying for the final. The performance received 42 televoting points, which included the maximum 12 awarded by Georgia. The jury points added to 76, including 10 from Greece, Moldova and Poland. In the final, San Marino placed 22nd with 50 points, with Poland awarding San Marino its first ever 12-points from a jury. Over the course of the contest, San Marino awarded its 12 points to Poland (jury) and Moldova (televote) in the second semi-final, and to France (jury) and Italy (televote) in the final.

==== Points awarded to San Marino ====
Points awarded to San Marino (Semi-final 2)
Score	Televote	Jury
12 points	Georgia	
10 points		Greece; Moldova; Poland
8 points		Albania; France
7 points	Albania	
6 points		
5 points		Denmark
4 points	Estonia; Spain	United Kingdom
3 points	Iceland; Serbia	Iceland; Spain
2 points	Denmark; Greece; Poland; United Kingdom	Bulgaria; Czech Republic; Finland; Latvia; Serbia; Switzerland
1 point	Finland	Austria; Estonia; Georgia

Points awarded to San Marino (Final)
Score	Televote	Jury
12 points		Poland
10 points		
8 points		
7 points	Georgia	Greece
6 points		
5 points		Albania; Denmark
4 points		France
3 points	Azerbaijan; Italy	United Kingdom
2 points		
1 point		Malta

==== Points awarded by San Marino ====
Points awarded by San Marino (Semi-final 2)
Score	Aggregated televote	Jury
12 points	Moldova	Poland
10 points	Finland	Greece
8 points	Iceland	Moldova
7 points	Serbia	Albania
6 points	Switzerland	Switzerland
5 points	Greece	Bulgaria
4 points	Bulgaria	Serbia
3 points	Portugal	Finland
2 points	Albania	Portugal
1 point	Denmark	Iceland

Points awarded by San Marino (Final)
Score	Aggregated televote	Jury
12 points	Italy	France
10 points	France	Italy
8 points	Cyprus	Greece
7 points	Greece	Malta
6 points	Moldova	Lithuania
5 points	Ukraine	Moldova
4 points	Finland	Switzerland
3 points	Switzerland	Bulgaria
2 points	Bulgaria	Albania
1 point	Russia	Finland

==== Detailed voting results ====
Detailed voting results from San Marino (Semi-final 2)
R/O	Country	Jury							Aggregated televote	
R/O	Country	Juror A	Juror B	Juror C	Juror D	Juror E	Rank	Points	Rank	Points
01	San Marino									
02	Estonia	5	10	11	13	10	13		12	
03	Czech Republic	15	11	9	4	13	12		16	
04	Greece	1	8	1	3	4	2	10	6	5
05	Austria	8	13	14	10	9	14		13	
06	Poland	2	1	5	2	3	1	12	14	
07	Moldova	4	3	3	5	6	3	8	1	12
08	Iceland	13	5	6	14	7	10	1	3	8
09	Serbia	16	16	7	1	12	7	4	4	7
10	Georgia	9	15	13	11	15	16		11	
11	Albania	7	4	2	9	5	4	7	9	2
12	Portugal	14	14	15	6	2	9	2	8	3
13	Bulgaria	3	9	12	7	8	6	5	7	4
14	Finland	6	2	10	16	16	8	3	2	10
15	Latvia	11	12	4	8	14	11		15	
16	Switzerland	10	7	8	12	1	5	6	5	6
17	Denmark	12	6	16	15	11	15		10	1

Detailed voting results from San Marino (Final)
R/O	Country	Jury							Aggregated televote	
R/O	Country	Juror A	Juror B	Juror C	Juror D	Juror E	Rank	Points	Rank	Points
01	Cyprus	9	14	13	16	11	17		3	8
02	Albania	10	6	11	14	7	9	2	19	
03	Israel	13	23	15	17	17	20		18	
04	Belgium	6	20	22	12	8	13		23	
05	Russia	11	16	17	5	15	14		10	1
06	Malta	7	4	2	20	3	4	7	17	
07	Portugal	23	19	6	7	24	15		20	
08	Serbia	25	24	21	2	14	11		16	
09	United Kingdom	21	17	14	22	22	22		24	
10	Greece	4	9	4	4	2	3	8	4	7
11	Switzerland	12	7	3	23	9	7	4	8	3
12	Iceland	16	8	16	8	10	12		13	
13	Spain	22	18	23	25	23	25		22	
14	Moldova	8	5	12	18	5	6	5	5	6
15	Germany	24	21	25	9	19	19		21	
16	Finland	14	3	24	10	16	10	1	7	4
17	Bulgaria	5	11	9	6	13	8	3	9	2
18	Lithuania	3	10	8	15	6	5	6	12	
19	Ukraine	15	13	10	24	12	18		6	5
20	France	1	2	1	3	1	1	12	2	10
21	Azerbaijan	20	15	18	19	21	23		15	
22	Norway	19	22	20	21	25	24		14	
23	Netherlands	18	25	19	13	20	21		25	
24	Italy	2	1	5	1	4	2	10	1	12
25	Sweden	17	12	7	11	18	16		11	
26	San Marino									
