= Poland in the Eurovision Song Contest 2021 =

- Eurovision Song Contest 2021
- Participating broadcaster: Telewizja Polska (TVP)
- Country: Poland
- Selection process: Internal selection
- Announcement date: 12 March 2021

Competing entry
- Song: "The Ride"
- Artist: Rafał
- Songwriters: Joakim Övrenius; Thomas Karlsson; Clara Rubensson; Johan Mauritzson

Placement
- Semi-final result: Failed to qualify (14th)

Participation chronology

Poland was represented at the Eurovision Song Contest 2021 with the song "The Ride" written by Joakim Övrenius, Thomas Karlsson, Clara Rubensson and Johan Mauritzson. The song was performed by Rafał. In March 2021, the Polish broadcaster Telewizja Polska (TVP) announced that the Polish entry for the 2021 contest in Rotterdam, Netherlands would be selected through an internal selection. Rafał and the song "The Ride" were announced as the Polish entry on 12 March 2021 during the TVP2 programme Pytanie na śniadanie.

Poland was drawn to compete in the second semi-final of the Eurovision Song Contest which took place on 20 May 2021. Performing during the show in position 6, "The Ride" was not announced among the top 10 entries of the second semi-final and therefore did not qualify to compete in the final. It was later revealed that Poland placed fourteenth out of the 17 participating countries in the semi-final with 35 points.

== Background ==
Prior to the 2021 Contest, Poland had participated in the Eurovision Song Contest twenty-two times since its first entry in 1994. Poland's highest placement in the contest, to this point, has been second place, which the nation achieved with its debut entry in 1994 with the song "To nie ja!" performed by Edyta Górniak. Poland has only, thus far, reached the top ten on two other occasions, when Ich Troje performing the song "Keine Grenzen – Żadnych granic" finished seventh in 2003, and when Michał Szpak performing the song "Color of Your Life" finished eighth in 2016. Between 2005 and 2011, Poland failed to qualify from the semi-final round six out of seven years with only their 2008 entry, "For Life" performed by Isis Gee, managing to take the nation to the final during that period. After once again failing to qualify to the final in 2011, the country withdrew from the contest during 2012 and 2013. Since returning to the contest in 2014, Poland managed to qualify to the final each year before failing to qualify to the final in 2018 and 2019, the latter with their entry "Fire of Love (Pali się)" performed by Tulia.

The Polish national broadcaster, Telewizja Polska (TVP), broadcasts the event within Poland and organises the selection process for the nation's entry. TVP confirmed Poland's participation in the 2020 Eurovision Song Contest on 1 October 2019. In 2020, TVP organised a televised national final which took place during the talent show Szansa na sukces that featured a competition among several artists and songs in order to select the Polish entry. However, on 7 March 2021, TVP announced that the Polish entry for the 2021 Eurovision Song Contest would be selected via an internal selection. The last time the Polish entry was selected internally was in 2019.

== Before Eurovision ==
=== Internal selection ===
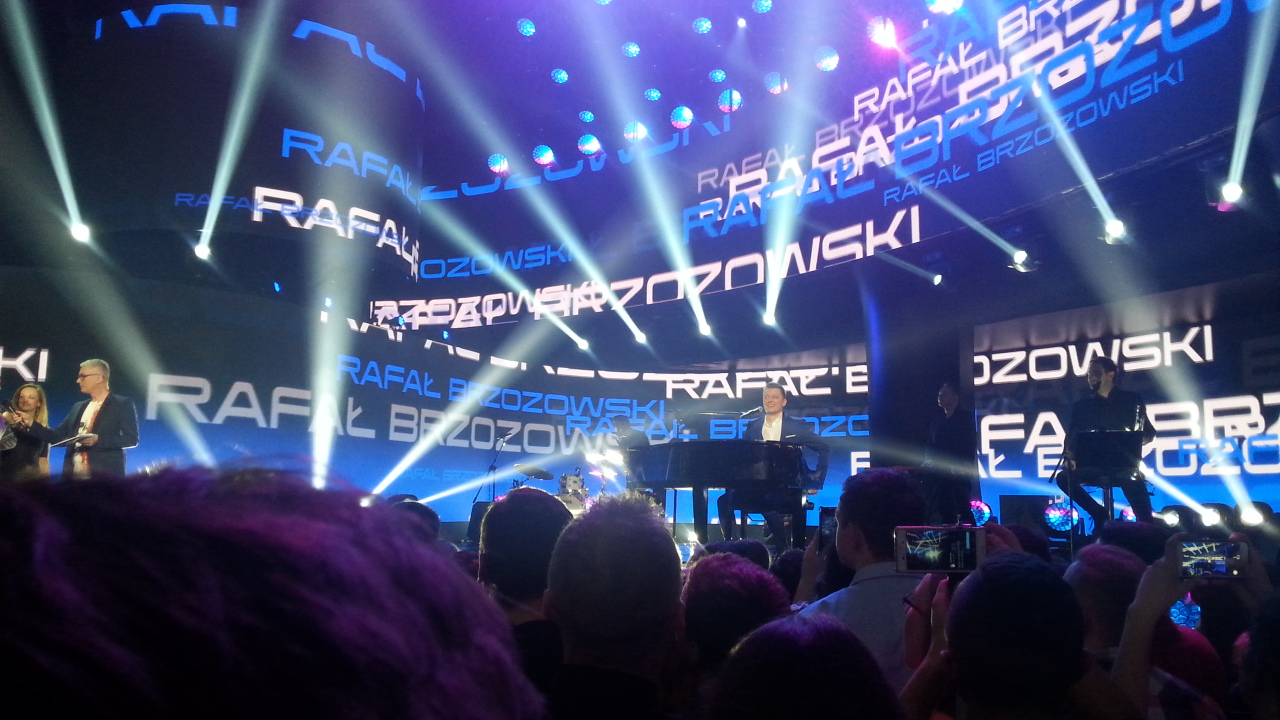
Rafał was internally selected to represent Poland in the Eurovision Song Contest 2021

The Polish entry for the 2021 Eurovision Song Contest was selected via an internal selection by the TVP Entertainment Agency with several artists and songwriters being directly invited to submit entries, including Cleo, who represented Poland in the Eurovision Song Contest in 2014, and Alicja Szemplińska, who was to represent Poland in the Eurovision Song Contest in 2020 before the contest was cancelled. TVP announced in March 2021 that the Polish entry would be presented on 12 March 2021 during the TVP2 programme Pytanie na śniadanie, hosted by Mateusz Szymkowiak.

During the broadcast of Pytanie na śniadanie, it was announced that Rafał Brzozowski would represent Poland with the song "The Ride", written by Joakim Övrenius, Thomas Karlsson, Clara Rubensson and Johan Mauritzson. The song was also presented to the public the same day via the release of the official music video on the official Eurovision Song Contest's YouTube channel. Rafał previously attempted to represent Poland at the Eurovision Song Contest in 2017, placing second in the national final with the song "Sky Over Europe", and had co-hosted the Junior Eurovision Song Contest 2020 in November 2020 which was held in Warsaw.

==== Controversy ====
Following the announcement of Rafał Brzozowski as the Polish entrant, Polish media reported that he had been chosen directly by CEO of TVP Jacek Kurski, allegedly due to Brzozowski being the favourite singer of Kurski's wife, Joanna. Kurski issued a statement where he refuted the claim, stating that "The Ride" had been selected "by a team of experts from the Creation and Entertainment Agency, who assessed only the song, not its performer", adding that his wife was "not involved in TVP affairs".

=== Promotion ===
Rafał's pre-contest promotion for "The Ride" was mainly focused in Poland. On 15 April, Rafał performed together with 2011 and 2021 Sammarinese Eurovision entrant Senhit during the TVP1 game show Jaka to melodia?, which he also presented. Rafał also performed during several online international events, including the Concert in the Dark on 21 April which was organised by Eurovoix, and the PrePartyES on 24 April which was organised by eurovision-spain.com.

== At Eurovision ==
According to Eurovision rules, all nations with the exceptions of the host country and the "Big Five" (France, Germany, Italy, Spain and the United Kingdom) are required to qualify from one of two semi-finals in order to compete for the final; the top ten countries from each semi-final progress to the final. The European Broadcasting Union (EBU) split up the competing countries into six different pots based on voting patterns from previous contests, with countries with favourable voting histories put into the same pot. The semi-final allocation draw held for the Eurovision Song Contest 2020 on 28 January 2020 was used for the 2021 contest, which Poland was placed into the second semi-final, to be held on 20 May 2021, and was scheduled to perform in the first half of the show.

Once all the competing songs for the 2021 contest had been released, the running order for the semi-finals was decided by the shows' producers rather than through another draw, so that similar songs were not placed next to each other. Poland was set to perform in position 6, following the entry from Austria and before the entry from Moldova.

The two semi-finals and the final were broadcast in Poland on TVP1 and TVP Polonia with commentary by Marek Sierocki and Aleksander Sikora. The three shows also aired on a one-day delay on TVP Rozrywka (semi-finals only) and TVP Kobieta (semi-finals and final). The Polish spokesperson, who announced the top 12-point score awarded by the Polish jury during the final, was co-presenter of the Junior Eurovision Song Contest 2019 and 2020 Ida Nowakowska.

=== Semi-final ===
Poland performed sixth in the second semi-final, following the entry from Austria and preceding the entry from Moldova. At the end of the show, Poland was not announced among the top 10 entries in the second semi-final and therefore failed to qualify to compete in the final. It was later revealed that Poland placed 14th in the semi-final, receiving a total of 35 points: 17 points from the televoting and 18 points from the juries.

=== Voting ===
Voting during the three shows involved each country awarding two sets of points from 1–8, 10 and 12: one from their professional jury and the other from televoting. Each nation's jury consisted of five music industry professionals who are citizens of the country they represent. This jury judged each entry based on: vocal capacity; the stage performance; the song's composition and originality; and the overall impression by the act. In addition, each member of a national jury may only take part in the panel once every three years, and no jury was permitted to discuss of their vote with other members or be related in any way to any of the competing acts in such a way that they cannot vote impartially and independently. The individual rankings of each jury member in an anonymised form as well as the nation's televoting results were released shortly after the grand final.

Below is a breakdown of points awarded to Poland and awarded by Poland in the second semi-final and grand final of the contest, and the breakdown of the jury voting and televoting conducted during the two shows:

==== Points awarded to Poland ====
Points awarded to Poland (Semi-final 2)
Score	Televote	Jury
12 points		San Marino
10 points		
8 points		
7 points	Moldova; United Kingdom	
6 points		
5 points		
4 points		
3 points		Bulgaria
2 points		Greece
1 point	Austria; France; Iceland	Denmark

==== Points awarded by Poland ====
Points awarded by Poland (Semi-final 2)
Score	Televote	Jury
12 points	Finland	Greece
10 points	Iceland	San Marino
8 points	Switzerland	Switzerland
7 points	Moldova	Moldova
6 points	Denmark	Albania
5 points	Portugal	Bulgaria
4 points	Bulgaria	Estonia
3 points	Georgia	Iceland
2 points	San Marino	Finland
1 point	Serbia	Portugal

Points awarded by Poland (Final)
Score	Televote	Jury
12 points	Ukraine	San Marino
10 points	Italy	Iceland
8 points	Iceland	Portugal
7 points	Switzerland	Switzerland
6 points	Finland	Israel
5 points	France	Italy
4 points	Lithuania	Malta
3 points	Norway	Belgium
2 points	Russia	Finland
1 point	Sweden	Russia

==== Detailed voting results ====
The following members comprised the Polish jury:

- Norbert Dudziuk (Norbi)
- Joanna Klepko (Cleo)
- Michał Michalik
- Piotr Winnicki
- Anna Żaczek-Biderman

Detailed voting results from Poland (Semi-final 2)
R/O	Country	Jury							Televote	
R/O	Country	Juror A	Juror B	Juror C	Juror D	Juror E	Rank	Points	Rank	Points
01	San Marino	1	2	1	3	6	2	10	9	2
02	Estonia	6	6	5	14	8	7	4	12	
03	Czech Republic	11	16	15	12	10	14		16	
04	Greece	3	1	2	1	4	1	12	11	
05	Austria	9	15	11	7	15	11		15	
06	Poland									
07	Moldova	2	7	4	6	2	4	7	4	7
08	Iceland	13	8	7	8	7	8	3	2	10
09	Serbia	10	12	16	16	12	15		10	1
10	Georgia	15	14	13	11	9	12		8	3
11	Albania	8	5	6	4	3	5	6	13	
12	Portugal	14	11	9	5	13	10	1	6	5
13	Bulgaria	4	3	8	10	5	6	5	7	4
14	Finland	7	9	10	9	11	9	2	1	12
15	Latvia	12	10	12	15	14	13		14	
16	Switzerland	5	4	3	2	1	3	8	3	8
17	Denmark	16	13	14	13	16	16		5	6

Detailed voting results from Poland (Final)
R/O	Country	Jury							Televote	
R/O	Country	Juror A	Juror B	Juror C	Juror D	Juror E	Rank	Points	Rank	Points
01	Cyprus	13	20	11	15	17	19		16	
02	Albania	14	9	25	18	15	18		23	
03	Israel	5	4	5	10	9	5	6	22	
04	Belgium	26	17	17	6	1	8	3	19	
05	Russia	3	8	21	25	13	10	1	9	2
06	Malta	6	5	12	9	7	7	4	11	
07	Portugal	4	7	3	5	2	3	8	17	
08	Serbia	18	16	20	21	25	23		20	
09	United Kingdom	12	10	9	12	16	11		26	
10	Greece	15	19	19	8	14	15		14	
11	Switzerland	7	3	2	4	8	4	7	4	7
12	Iceland	2	1	4	1	4	2	10	3	8
13	Spain	19	18	13	23	11	22		24	
14	Moldova	24	23	26	17	6	16		21	
15	Germany	8	25	18	24	21	20		18	
16	Finland	10	11	8	7	10	9	2	5	6
17	Bulgaria	22	12	14	13	24	21		15	
18	Lithuania	23	24	24	14	23	24		7	4
19	Ukraine	9	13	22	20	12	14		1	12
20	France	20	14	6	16	19	13		6	5
21	Azerbaijan	21	21	23	22	20	26		12	
22	Norway	25	26	15	26	26	25		8	3
23	Netherlands	16	6	10	19	22	12		25	
24	Italy	17	22	7	2	5	6	5	2	10
25	Sweden	11	15	16	11	18	17		10	1
26	San Marino	1	2	1	3	3	1	12	13	
