= Portugal in the Eurovision Song Contest 2021 =

- Eurovision Song Contest 2021
- Participating broadcaster: Rádio e Televisão de Portugal (RTP)
- Country: Portugal
- Selection process: Festival da Canção 2021
- Selection date: 6 March 2021

Competing entry
- Song: "Love Is on My Side"
- Artist: The Black Mamba
- Songwriters: Pedro "Tatanka" Taborda

Placement
- Semi-final result: Qualified (4th, 239 points)
- Final result: 12th, 153 points

Participation chronology

Portugal was represented at the Eurovision Song Contest 2021 with the song "Love Is on My Side" written by Pedro "Tatanka" Taborda, and performed by the band the Black Mamba. The Portuguese participating broadcaster, Rádio e Televisão de Portugal (RTP), organised the national final Festival da Canção 2021 in order to select its entry for the contest. After two semi-finals and a final which took place in February and March 2021, "Love Is on My Side" performed by the Black Mamba emerged as the winner after achieving the joint highest score following the combination of votes from seven regional juries and a public televote, winning the tiebreaker due to having more points from the latter.

Portugal was drawn to compete in the second semi-final of the Eurovision Song Contest which took place on 20 May 2021. Performing during the show in position 12, "Love Is on My Side" was announced among the top 10 entries of the second semi-final and therefore qualified to compete in the final on 22 May. It was later revealed that Portugal placed fourth out of the 17 participating countries in the semi-final with 239 points. In the final, Portugal performed in position 7 and placed twelfth out of the 26 participating countries with 153 points.

== Background ==
Prior to the 2021 contest, Radiotelevisão Portuguesa (RTP) until 2003, and Rádio e Televisão de Portugal (RTP) since 2004, had participated in the Eurovision Song Contest representing Portugal fifty-one times since their first entry in 1964. Portugal had won the contest on one occasion: in 2017 with the song "Amar pelos dois" performed by Salvador Sobral. Following the introduction of semi-finals for the 2004, Portugal had featured in only five finals. Portugal's least successful result has been last place, which they have achieved on four occasions, most recently in 2018 with the song "O jardim" performed by Cláudia Pascoal. Portugal has also received nul points on two occasions; in 1964 and 1997. The nation failed to qualify to the final in 2019 with the song "Telemóveis" performed by Conan Osíris. In 2020, Elisa was set to represent Portugal with the song "Medo de sentir" before the contest's cancellation.

As part of its duties as participating broadcaster, RTP organises the selection of its entry in the Eurovision Song Contest and broadcasts the event in the country. The broadcaster confirmed its participation in the 2021 contest on 16 October 2020. RTP has traditionally selected its entry for the contest via the music competition Festival da Canção, with exceptions in 1988 and in 2005 when the entries were internally selected. Along with its participation confirmation, RTP revealed details regarding its selection procedure and announced the organization of Festival da Canção 2021 in order to select its 2021 entry.

== Before Eurovision ==
=== Festival da Canção 2021 ===
The official logotype of Festival da Canção 2021.

Festival da Canção 2021 was the 55th edition of Festival da Canção that selected Portugal's entry for the Eurovision Song Contest 2021. Twenty entries competed in the competition that consisted of two semi-finals held on 20 and 27 February 2021 leading to a ten-song final on 6 March 2021. All three shows of the competition took place at RTP's Studio 1 in Lisbon and were broadcast on RTP1 and RTP Internacional as well as online via RTP Play. The shows were also broadcast on RTP Acessibilidades with presentation in Portuguese Sign Language.

==== Format ====
The format of the competition consisted of three shows: two semi-finals on 20 and 27 February 2021 and the final on 6 March 2021. Each semi-final featured ten competing entries from which five advanced from each show to complete the ten song lineup in the final. Results during the semi-finals were determined by the 50/50 combination of votes from a jury panel appointed by RTP and public televoting, while results during the final were determined by the 50/50 combination of votes from seven regional juries and public televoting, which was opened following the second semi-final and closed during the final show. Both the public televote and the juries assigned points from 1–8, 10 and 12 based on the ranking developed by both streams of voting.

==== Competing entries ====
Twenty composers were selected by RTP through two methods: eighteen invited by RTP for the competition and two selected from 693 submissions received through an open call for songs. The composers, which both created the songs and selected its performers, were required to submit the demo and final versions of their entries by 30 November and 31 December 2020, respectively. Songs could be submitted in any language. The selected composers were revealed on 4 December 2020, while the competing artists were revealed on 20 January 2021.

Artist	Song	Songwriter(s)	Selection
Ana Tereza	"Com um abraço"	Viviane, Tó Viegas	Invited by RTP
Ariana	"Mundo melhor"	Virgul, Alex D'Alva	Invited by RTP
The Black Mamba	"Love Is on My Side"	Tatanka	Invited by RTP
Carolina Deslandes	"Por um triz"	Carolina Deslandes	Invited by RTP
Da Chick	"I Got Music"	Da Chick	Invited by RTP
Eu.Clides	"Volte-face"	Pedro da Linha, Tota	Invited by RTP
Fábia Maia	"Dia lindo"	Fábia Maia	Invited by RTP
Graciela	"A vida sem acontecer"	João Vieira	Invited by RTP
Ian	"Mundo"	Ian	Invited by RTP
Irma	"Livros"	Irma, Pity	Invited by RTP
Joana Alegre	"Joana do mar"	Joana Alegre	Invited by RTP
Karetus and Romeu Bairos	"Saudade"	Karetus, Romeu Bairos	Invited by RTP
Mema	"Claro como água"	Stereossauro, Mema.	Invited by RTP
Miguel Marôco	"Girassol"	Miguel Marôco	Open call winner
Nadine	"Cheguei aqui"	Anne Victorino D'Almeida, Tiago Torres da Silva	Invited by RTP
Neev	"Dancing in the Stars"	Neev	Invited by RTP
Pedro Gonçalves	"Não vou ficar"	Pedro Gonçalves	Open call winner
Sara Afonso	"Contramão"	Melo, Teresa Sequeira	Invited by RTP
Tainá	"Jasmim"	Tainá	Invited by RTP
Valéria	"Na mais profunda saudade"	Hélder Moutinho	Invited by RTP

==== Semi-finals ====
The two semi-finals took place on 20 and 27 February 2021. The first semi-final was hosted by Jorge Gabriel and Sónia Araújo while the second semi-final was hosted by Tânia Ribas de Oliveira and José Carlos Malato. In each semi-final eight entries competed and four advanced to the final based on the 50/50 combination of votes of a jury panel consisting of Marta Carvalho, NBC, Paulo de Carvalho, Rita Carmo, Rita Guerra and Vanessa Augusto, and a public televote.

In addition to the competing entries, Dora and Elisa performed as the interval acts in the first semi-final, while Agir and Portuguese Eurovision 1996 entrant Lucia Móniz performed as the interval acts in the second semi-final.

Semi-final 1 – 20 February 2021
R/O	Artist	Song	Jury	Televote	Total	Place
1	The Black Mamba	"Love Is on My Side"	10	12	22	1
2	Valéria	"Na mais profunda saudade"	6	10	16	3
3	Mema	"Claro como água"	2	1	3	10
4	Nadine	"Cheguei aqui"	1	6	7	9
5	Miguel Marôco	"Girassol"	3	5	8	8
6	Fábia Maia	"Dia lindo"	8	2	10	5
7	Irma	"Livros"	5	3	8	6
8	Karetus and Romeu Bairos	"Saudade"	7	8	15	4
9	Sara Afonso	"Contramão"	12	7	19	2
10	Ian	"Mundo"	4	4	8	7

Semi-final 2 – 27 February 2021
R/O	Artist	Song	Jury	Televote	Total	Place
1	Da Chick	"I Got Music"	1	5	6	10
2	Tainá	"Jasmim"	4	2	6	9
3	Ariana	"Mundo melhor"	6	1	7	8
4	Eu.Clides	"Volte-face"	10	3	13	4
5	Joana Alegre	"Joana do mar"	7	8	15	3
6	Pedro Gonçalves	"Não vou ficar"	3	7	10	5
7	Ana Tereza	"Com um abraço"	5	4	9	6
8	Carolina Deslandes	"Por um triz"	12	10	22	1
9	Graciela	"A vida sem acontecer"	2	6	8	7
10	Neev	"Dancing in the Stars"	8	12	20	2

==== Final ====
The final took place on 6 March 2021, hosted by Filomena Cautela and Vasco Palmeirim. The ten entries that qualified from the two preceding semi-finals competed and the winner, "Love Is on My Side" performed by the Black Mamba, was selected based on the 50/50 combination of votes of seven regional juries and a public televote. Carolina Deslandes and the Black Mamba were both tied for the first place with 20 points but since the Black Mamba received the most votes from the public they were declared the winner. "Love Is on My Side" is the first song performed entirely in the English language that was selected to represent Portugal at the Eurovision Song Contest. Ricardo Ribeiro, Ana Moura, Camané, Dino D'Santiago, Portuguese Eurovision 2018 entrant Cláudia Pascoal together with Clã, Filipe Sambado and Sérgio Godinho, and Elisa performed as the interval acts.

Final – 6 March 2021
R/O	Artist	Song	Jury	Televote	Total	Place
1	Karetus and Romeu Bairos	"Saudade"	4	6	10	6
2	Joana Alegre	"Joana do mar"	6	3	9	7
3	Fábia Maia	"Dia lindo"	2	1	3	10
4	Valéria	"Na mais profunda saudade"	3	7	10	5
5	Carolina Deslandes	"Por um triz"	12	8	20	2
6	Neev	"Dancing in the Stars"	5	12	17	3
7	Pedro Gonçalves	"Não vou ficar"	1	4	5	9
8	Sara Afonso	"Contramão"	8	5	13	4
9	Eu.Clides	"Volte-face"	7	2	9	8
10	The Black Mamba	"Love Is on My Side"	10	10	20	1

Detailed regional jury votes
R/O	Song	Central	Lisbon Area	Alentejo	Algarve	Madeira	Azores	North	Total	Points
1	"Saudade"	5	4	2	3	4	10	1	29	4
2	"Joana do mar"	10	7	12	4	5	3	3	44	6
3	"Dia lindo"	2	2	5	2	1	1	6	19	2
4	"Na mais profunda saudade"	4	3	8	5	2	4	2	28	3
5	"Por um triz"	7	12	10	10	10	8	10	67	12
6	"Dancing in the Stars"	3	8	1	7	8	7	4	38	5
7	"Não vou ficar"	1	1	3	1	3	2	5	16	1
8	"Contramão"	8	5	7	8	7	12	8	55	8
9	"Volte-face"	6	6	6	6	6	5	12	47	7
10	"Love Is on My Side"	12	10	4	12	12	6	7	63	10
Members of the jury
Central: Surma, Rui Ferreira, Tony Fortuna; Lisbon Area: Rita Redshoes, Papillon, Matay; Alentejo: Luís Trigacheiro, Ana Sofia Varela, TIM; Algarve: Teresa Aleixo, Napoleão Mira, Aurea; Madeira: Bruno Santos, João Borges, Noémia Gonçalves; Azores: Rui Rufino, Lúcia Moniz, Nélson Cabral; North: Marta Ren, Pedro Saraiva, Rui Massena

== At Eurovision ==
According to Eurovision rules, all nations with the exceptions of the host country and the "Big Five" (France, Germany, Italy, Spain and the United Kingdom) are required to qualify from one of two semi-finals in order to compete for the final; the top ten countries from each semi-final progress to the final. The European Broadcasting Union (EBU) split up the competing countries into six different pots based on voting patterns from previous contests, with countries with favourable voting histories put into the same pot. The semi-final allocation draw held for the Eurovision Song Contest 2020 on 28 January 2020 was used for the 2021 contest, which Portugal was placed into the second semi-final, to be held on 20 May 2021, and was scheduled to perform in the second half of the show.

Once all the competing songs for the 2021 contest had been released, the running order for the semi-finals was decided by the shows' producers rather than through another draw, so that similar songs were not placed next to each other. Portugal was set to perform in position 12, following the entry from Albania and before the entry from Bulgaria.

In Portugal, the three shows were broadcast on RTP1, RTP Internacional and RTP África with commentary by José Carlos Malato and Nuno Galopim. The second semi-final and the final were broadcast live, while the first semi-final was broadcast on a two-hour delay. The Portuguese spokesperson, who announced the top 12-point score awarded by the Portuguese jury during the final, was Elisa.

=== Semi-final ===
Portugal performed twelfth in the second semi-final, following the entry from Albania and preceding the entry from Bulgaria. At the end of the show, Portugal was announced as having finished in the top 10 and subsequently qualifying for the grand final. It was later revealed that Portugal placed fourth in the semi-final, receiving a total of 239 points: 111 points from the televoting and 128 points from the juries.

=== Final ===
Shortly after the second semi-final, a winners' press conference was held for the ten qualifying countries. As part of this press conference, the qualifying artists took part in a draw to determine which half of the grand final they would subsequently participate in. This draw was done in the order the countries were announced during the semi-final. Portugal was drawn to compete in the first half. Following this draw, the shows' producers decided upon the running order of the final, as they had done for the semi-finals. Portugal was subsequently placed to perform in position 7, following the entry from Malta and before the entry from Serbia. Portugal placed twelfth in the final, scoring 153 points: 27 points from the televoting and 126 points from the juries.

=== Voting ===
Voting during the three shows involved each country awarding two sets of points from 1–8, 10 and 12: one from their professional jury and the other from televoting. Each nation's jury consisted of five music industry professionals who are citizens of the country they represent. This jury judged each entry based on: vocal capacity; the stage performance; the song's composition and originality; and the overall impression by the act. In addition, each member of a national jury may only take part in the panel once every three years, and no jury was permitted to discuss of their vote with other members or be related in any way to any of the competing acts in such a way that they cannot vote impartially and independently. The individual rankings of each jury member in an anonymised form as well as the nation's televoting results were released shortly after the grand final.

Below is a breakdown of points awarded to Portugal and awarded by Portugal in the second semi-final and grand final of the contest, and the breakdown of the jury voting and televoting conducted during the two shows:

==== Points awarded to Portugal ====
Points awarded to Portugal (Semi-final 2)
Score	Televote	Jury
12 points	Spain	Czech Republic
10 points	France; Switzerland	France; Georgia; Spain; Switzerland; United Kingdom
8 points	Denmark; Iceland	Bulgaria; Iceland; Latvia
7 points	Austria	Austria; Finland; Serbia
6 points	Albania; Finland; United Kingdom	Estonia
5 points	Bulgaria; Estonia; Latvia; Poland	Greece
4 points	Czech Republic; Moldova; Serbia	Denmark
3 points	Greece; San Marino	
2 points		Moldova; San Marino
1 point		Albania; Poland

Points awarded to Portugal (Final)
Score	Televote	Jury
12 points		Czech Republic
10 points		Iceland; Romania
8 points	France; Switzerland	France; Georgia; Poland
7 points		Austria; Malta; Switzerland; United Kingdom
6 points	Netherlands	Bulgaria; Italy; Lithuania
5 points		Estonia; Serbia; Spain
4 points		
3 points		
2 points	Iceland; Ireland	Azerbaijan; Moldova; Ukraine
1 points	Spain	Belgium; Croatia; Cyprus

==== Points awarded by Portugal ====
Points awarded by Portugal (Semi-final 2)
Score	Televote	Jury
12 points	Moldova	Bulgaria
10 points	Greece	Iceland
8 points	Switzerland	Albania
7 points	Iceland	Switzerland
6 points	Finland	Finland
5 points	Bulgaria	Czech Republic
4 points	Denmark	Serbia
3 points	Georgia	Greece
2 points	Serbia	Austria
1 point	Albania	Estonia

Points awarded by Portugal (Final)
Score	Televote	Jury
12 points	France	Bulgaria
10 points	Ukraine	Russia
8 points	Moldova	Iceland
7 points	Italy	Switzerland
6 points	Switzerland	France
5 points	Finland	Belgium
4 points	Sweden	Malta
3 points	Iceland	Italy
2 points	Greece	Ukraine
1 point	Russia	Netherlands

==== Detailed voting results ====
The following members comprised the Portuguese jury:

- Dino d'Santiago
- Dora
- João Reis Moreira
- Marta Carvalho
- Pedro Penim

Detailed voting results from Portugal (Semi-final 2)
R/O	Country	Jury							Televote	
R/O	Country	Juror A	Juror B	Juror C	Juror D	Juror E	Rank	Points	Rank	Points
01	San Marino	8	11	10	10	8	11		11	
02	Estonia	9	3	14	11	12	10	1	13	
03	Czech Republic	13	2	3	6	13	6	5	14	
04	Greece	6	10	8	8	7	8	3	2	10
05	Austria	12	5	13	13	5	9	2	12	
06	Poland	15	12	15	14	16	16		16	
07	Moldova	11	13	9	7	11	13		1	12
08	Iceland	4	6	1	2	10	2	10	4	7
09	Serbia	10	7	7	5	9	7	4	9	2
10	Georgia	7	15	16	9	14	15		8	3
11	Albania	2	4	4	15	4	3	8	10	1
12	Portugal									
13	Bulgaria	1	1	2	1	3	1	12	6	5
14	Finland	3	8	6	16	1	5	6	5	6
15	Latvia	14	14	12	12	6	14		15	
16	Switzerland	5	9	5	4	2	4	7	3	8
17	Denmark	16	16	11	3	15	12		7	4

Detailed voting results from Portugal (Final)
R/O	Country	Jury							Televote	
R/O	Country	Juror A	Juror B	Juror C	Juror D	Juror E	Rank	Points	Rank	Points
01	Cyprus	16	18	12	16	23	16		19	
02	Albania	18	17	17	21	13	19		24	
03	Israel	8	8	18	14	10	14		16	
04	Belgium	9	2	3	9	9	6	5	18	
05	Russia	5	11	2	3	6	2	10	10	1
06	Malta	4	9	7	6	4	7	4	15	
07	Portugal									
08	Serbia	11	10	9	7	17	13		20	
09	United Kingdom	25	16	21	24	21	24		25	
10	Greece	17	22	22	15	22	22		9	2
11	Switzerland	2	15	6	8	2	4	7	5	6
12	Iceland	3	6	4	5	7	3	8	8	3
13	Spain	15	19	19	25	25	23		12	
14	Moldova	19	24	23	13	16	21		3	8
15	Germany	22	12	25	23	15	20		17	
16	Finland	6	13	20	22	3	11		6	5
17	Bulgaria	1	1	10	2	5	1	12	13	
18	Lithuania	20	20	14	4	8	12		14	
19	Ukraine	21	7	1	10	19	9	2	2	10
20	France	7	5	8	12	1	5	6	1	12
21	Azerbaijan	14	14	11	11	14	15		21	
22	Norway	23	21	24	18	24	25		11	
23	Netherlands	10	4	5	19	20	10	1	22	
24	Italy	12	3	16	1	11	8	3	4	7
25	Sweden	13	23	13	20	18	17		7	4
26	San Marino	24	25	15	17	12	18		23	
