= Ilta =

Finnish singer (born 1996)

- Born: Ilta Elina Fuchs; 30 December 1996 (age 29); Jyväskylä, Finland
- Genres: Pop
- Occupation: Singer-songwriter
- Label: Warner Music Finland

Ilta Elina Silva (née Fuchs; born 30 December 1996), known mononymously as Ilta, is a Finnish singer and songwriter. She rose to prominence after being a guest soloist on Cheek's song "Sillat" in 2015.

== Career ==
Ilta ended up singing on the song "Sillat" after being introduced to another student through her singing teacher, who later ended up working for the management company Fullsteam and suggested that she become Ilta's manager. Ilta made demos for Fullsteam, which ended up being heard by Cheek, who was also managed by the same company.

In early 2016, she signed a recording contract with Warner Music Finland and released covers of Adele's songs "All I Ask" and "River Lea". Her first solo single, "Koukkuun", was released in July 2017. "Koukkuun" has been certified gold.

Ilta competed in the fifth season of the MTV3 program Tähdet, tähdet in spring 2019. She finished third in the competition.

Ilta's debut studio album Näitä hetkiä varten was released in September 2020. In January 2021, she was announced as one of the seven finalists of the Uuden Musiikin Kilpailu 2021 with the song "Kelle mä soitan", where she finished in third place.

Ilta participated in the 15th season of the TV show Vain elämää.

== Personal life ==
Ilta graduated from Schildt Upper Secondary School in Jyväskylä in spring 2015. She graduated as a musician from the Helsinki Pop & Jazz Conservatory in December 2018.

Ilta's father is German. Ilta got engaged to her boyfriend Troy Silva, who is from Costa Rica, on the last day of 2020. The couple married in July 2021. In 2024, they announced that they were expecting their first child, a son, who was born in the spring of 2025.

== Discography ==
=== Studio albums ===
List of studio albums, with selected details
Title	Details	Peak chart positions	Certifications
Title	Details	FIN	Certifications
Näitä hetkiä varten	Released: 4 September 2020; Label: Warner Music Finland; Formats: LP, CD, Digital download, streaming	6	*FIN: Gold
Kanskje det går te helvete	Released: 1 September 2023; Label: Warner Music Finland; Formats: LP, Digital download, streaming	20	*FIN: Gold
Jokaisen hymyn takana	Released: 6 March 2026; Label: Sony Music; Format: Digital download	12	

=== Singles ===
==== As lead artist ====
Title	Year	Peak chart positions				Album
Title	Year	FIN	FIN: Download	FIN: Digital	FIN: Radio	Album
”Koukkuun”	2017	–	28	35	93	
”Oi jouluyö”	2017	–	–	–	–	Joulu
”Ristitulessa”	2018	–	–	–	–	
”Muurit”	2018	–	–	–	–	
”Naurettava”	2018	–	–	35	–	
”Taivas sylissäni”	2018	30	–	27	–	
”Kun katsoit minuun”	2019	–	–	47	45	Tähdet, tähdet
”Romeo ja Julia”	2019	–	–	–	–	Tähdet, tähdet
”I Will Always Love You”	2019	–	–	–	–	Tähdet, tähdet
”Minne mä meen”	2019	–	–	25	–	Näitä hetkiä varten
”Rakastaa ei rakasta”	2019	–	–	–	45	Näitä hetkiä varten
”Jouluksi kotiin”	2019	–	–	–	–	
”Anteeks”	2020	–	–	–	–	Näitä hetkiä varten
”Voimanainen”	2020	–	–	–	–	Näitä hetkiä varten
”Anna tuulla vaan”	2020	–	–	49	–	Näitä hetkiä varten
”Como fue”	2021	–	–	–	–	Laulu rakkaudelle – Secret Song Suomi
”Kelle mä soitan”	2021	5	–	–	8	Mä oon vaan ihminen
”Taivas maan päällä”	2021	–	–	–	–	Mä oon vaan ihminen
”Ei kukaan muu”	2022	–	–	–	21	Mä oon vaan ihminen
”Kuka hän on”	2022	–	–	–	68	Mä oon vaan ihminen
”Jumala tai naapuri”	2023	–	–	–	–	Mä oon vaan ihminen
”Susi”	2023	–	–	–	–	Mä oon vaan ihminen
”Pura vida / Häävalssi”	2023	–	–	–	–	Mä oon vaan ihminen
”Tää aika vuodesta taas”	2023	–	–	–	19	
”Kuuma kesä” (feat. THESAARINEN)	2024	–	–	–	–	Vain elämää
”Syntynyt uudelleen”	2024	–	–	–	–	Vain elämää
”Laula se ulos”	2024	–	–	–	–	Vain elämää
”Kesän lapsi”	2024	–	–	–	–	Vain elämää
”Kiire”	2024	21	–	–	48	Vain elämää
”Tässä talossa”	2024	25	–	–	95	Vain elämää
”Nemo”	2024	–	–	–	–	Vain elämää
”Valintojen valtakunta”	2025	–	–	–	–	Jokaisen hymyn takana
”En mieti sua”	2025	–	–	–	45	Jokaisen hymyn takana
”Yksin et koskaan sä mee”	2025	–	–	–	40	Jokaisen hymyn takana
”20:30” (feat. Karim B)	2026	13	–	–	46	Jokaisen hymyn takana
”Jokaisen hymyn takana”	2026	25	–	–	–	Jokaisen hymyn takana

==== As featured artist ====
Title	Year	Peak chart positions				Album
Title	Year	FIN	FIN: Download	FIN: Digital	FIN: Radio	Album
”Sillat” (Cheek feat. Ilta)	2015	1	3	6	14	Alpha Omega
”Spagettii” (Bang For The Buck feat. Ilta)	2017	–	11	–	–	
”Paratiisiin” (Pikku G feat. Ilta)	2018	7	–	7	–	Kilometrit
”Mitä sulle jää” (Pikku G feat. Ilta)	2019	3	–	3	–	Kilometrit
