= Estonia in the Eurovision Song Contest 2021 =

- Eurovision Song Contest 2021
- Participating broadcaster: Eesti Rahvusringhääling (ERR)
- Country: Estonia
- Selection process: Eesti Laul 2021
- Selection date: 6 March 2021

Competing entry
- Song: "The Lucky One"
- Artist: Uku Suviste
- Songwriters: Uku Suviste; Sharon Vaughn

Placement
- Semi-final result: Failed to qualify (13th)

Participation chronology

Estonia was represented at the Eurovision Song Contest 2021 with the song "The Lucky One" performed by Uku Suviste and written by Suviste himself along with Sharon Vaughn. The Estonian broadcaster Eesti Rahvusringhääling (ERR) organised the national final Eesti Laul 2021 in order to select the Estonian entry for the 2021 contest in Rotterdam, Netherlands. The national final consisted of three shows: two semi-finals and a final. Twelve songs competed in each semi-final and six from each semi-final as determined by a jury panel and public vote qualified to the final. In the final, the winner was selected over two rounds of voting. In the first round, a jury panel and a public vote selected the top three to qualify to the superfinal. In the superfinal, "The Lucky One" performed by Uku Suviste was selected as the winner entirely by a public vote.

Estonia was drawn to compete in the second semi-final of the Eurovision Song Contest which took place on 20 May 2021. Performing during the show in position 2, "The Lucky One" was not announced among the top 10 entries of the second semi-final and therefore did not qualify to compete in the final. It was later revealed that Estonia placed thirteenth out of the 17 participating countries in the semi-final with 58 points.

== Background ==
Prior to the 2021 Contest, Estonia had participated in the Eurovision Song Contest twenty-five times since its first entry in 1994, winning the contest on one occasion in 2001 with the song "Everybody" performed by Tanel Padar, Dave Benton and 2XL. Following the introduction of semi-finals for the 2004, Estonia has, to this point, managed to qualify to the final on seven occasions. In 2019, "Storm" performed by Victor Crone managed to qualify Estonia to the final where the song placed twentieth.

The Estonian national broadcaster, Eesti Rahvusringhääling (ERR), broadcasts the event within Estonia and organises the selection process for the nation's entry. ERR confirmed Estonia's participation at the 2021 Eurovision Song Contest on 18 March 2020 after the 2020 contest was cancelled due to the COVID-19 pandemic. Since their debut, the Estonian broadcaster has organised national finals that feature a competition among multiple artists and songs in order to select Estonia's entry for the Eurovision Song Contest. The Eesti Laul competition has been organised since 2009 in order to select Estonia's entry and also on 18 March 2020, ERR announced the organisation of Eesti Laul 2021 in order to select the nation's 2021 entry.

== Before Eurovision ==
=== Eesti Laul 2021 ===
Eesti Laul 2021 was the thirteenth edition of the Estonian national selection Eesti Laul, which selected Estonia's entry for the Eurovision Song Contest 2021. The competition took place at the Saku Suurhall in Tallinn, hosted by Tõnis Niinemets and Grete Kuld and consisted of twenty-four entries competing in two semi-finals on 18 and 20 February 2021 leading to a twelve-song final on 6 March 2021. All three shows were broadcast on Eesti Televisioon (ETV), on ETV+ with Russian commentary, via radio on Raadio 2 with commentary by Erik Morna, Margus Kamlat, Robin Juhkental and Kristo Rajasaare as well as streamed online at the broadcaster's official website err.ee.

==== Format ====
The format of the competition included two semi-finals on 18 and 20 February 2021 and a final on 6 March 2021. Twelve songs competed in each semi-final and the top six from each semi-final qualified to complete the twelve song lineup in the final. The results of the semi-finals was determined by the 50/50 combination of votes from a professional jury and public televoting for the first four qualifiers and a second round of public televoting for the fifth and sixth qualifiers. The winning song in the final was selected over two rounds of voting: the first round results selected the top three songs via the 50/50 combination of jury and public voting, while the second round (superfinal) determined the winner solely by public televoting.

==== Competing entries ====
On 1 September 2020, ERR opened the submission period for artists and composers to submit their entries up until 6 November 2020 through an online upload platform. Each artist and songwriter was only able to submit a maximum of five entries. Foreign collaborations were allowed as long as 50% of the songwriters were Estonian. A fee was also imposed on songs being submitted to the competition, with €25 for songs in the Estonian language and €75 for songs in other languages. One of the semi-finalist spots was reserved for Uku Suviste, who was to represent Estonia in the Eurovision Song Contest 2020 before the contest was cancelled. 156 submissions were received by the deadline. A 17-member jury panel selected 24 semi-finalists from the submissions and the selected songs were announced during the ETV entertainment program Ringvaade on 11 and 12 November 2020. The selection jury consisted of Bert Prikenfeld (DJ), Kaupo Karelson (television producer), Jüri Pihel (television producer), Jaan Pehk (musician), Anu Varusk (Warner Music Baltics regional marketing manager), Karl-Erik Taukar (singer), Sten Teppan (Vikerradio music editor), Mari-Liis Männik (Raadio Elmar presenter), Ahto Kruusmann (Raadio Uuno presenter), Margus Kamlat (Raadio 2 presenter), Laura Põldvere (singer), Vaido Pannel (Raadio Sky+ music editor), Robert Kõrvits (musician), Rauno Märks (Retro FM presenter), Dmitri Mikrjukov (Raadio 4 music editor), Andres Aljaste (Power Hit Radio presenter) and Liis Lemsalu (singer).

Among the competing artists were previous Eurovision Song Contest entrants Ivo Linna, who represented Estonia in 1996 with Maarja-Liis Ilus, Koit Toome, who represented Estonia in 1998 and in 2017 with Laura, Tanja, who represented Estonia in 2014, and Jüri Pootsmann, who represented Estonia in 2016. Andrei Zevakin, Egert Milder, Kaire Vilgats (member of Suured tüdrukud), Karl Killing, Kéa, Kristel Aaslaid (lead singer of Gram-Of-Fun), Nika Marula, Redel, Robert Linna, Sissi, Tuuli Rand, Uku Suviste and Wiiralt have all competed in previous editions of Eesti Laul.

Artist	Song	Songwriter(s)
Alabama Watchdog	"Alabama Watchdog"	Ken Einberg
Andrei Zevakin and Pluuto	"Wingman"	Andrei Zevakin, Henry Orlov
Egert Milder	"Free Again"	Kaspar Kalluste, Matteo Capreoli, Egert Milder
Gram-Of-Fun	"Lost in a Dance"	Martin Kuut, Kristel Aaslaid, Raul Ojamaa, Kostja Tsõbulevski, Mikk Simson
Hans Nayna	"One by One"	Vahur Valgmaa, Hans Nayna
Helen	"Nii kõrgele"	Rob Montes, Jason Hunter, Renae Rain, Helen Randmets
Heleza	"6"	Karl Killing, Helena Põldmaa
Ivo Linna, Robert Linna and Supernova	"Ma olen siin"	Rainer Michelson, Robert Linna
Jüri Pootsmann	"Magus melanhoolia"	Jüri Pootsmann, Joonas Mattias Sarapuu, Jana Hallas, Aleksi Liski
Kadri Voorand	"Energy"	Kadri Voorand
Karl Killing	"Kiss Me"	Karl Killing
Kéa	"Hypnotized"	Ketter Orav, Sander Sadam, Alvar Antson, Karl-Mathias Saarse
Kristin Kalnapenk	"Find a Way"	Kristin Kalnapenk, Hannes Agur Vellend
Koit Toome	"We Could Have Been Beautiful"	Joonas Parkkonen, Koit Toome, Peppina Pällijeff
Nika Marula	"Calm Down"	Andrei Zevakin, Nika Marula, Daniil Kotilevits
Rahel	"Sunday Night"	Rahel Ollisaar, Frederik Küüts, Jason Hunter
Redel	"Tartu"	Kristjan Oden, Indrek Vaheoja
Sissi	"Time"	Sissi Nylia Benita, Andrei Zevakin, Kelly Tulvik
Suured tüdrukud	"Heaven's Not That Far Tonight"	Koit Toome, Gevin Niglas, Karl Killing
Tanja	"Best Night Ever"	Timo Vendt, Tanja Mihhailova-Saar, Mihkel Mattisen
Tuuli Rand	"Üks öö"	Gevin Niglas, Kristel Aaslaid, Tuuli Rand
Uku Haasma	"Kaos"	Uku Haasma, Henri Erik Tammai, Rudolf Toltsberg
Uku Suviste	"The Lucky One"	Uku Suviste, Sharon Vaughn
Wiiralt	"Tuuled"	Pat Lyons, Martin Saaremägi

==== Semi-finals ====
The two semi-finals took place on 18 and 20 February 2021. In each semi-final twelve songs competed for the first four spots in the final with the outcome decided upon by the combination of the votes from a jury panel and a public televote which registered 12,643 votes in the first semi-final and 27,785 votes in the second semi-final; the remaining two qualifiers were decided by an additional televote between the remaining non-qualifiers which registered 5,902 votes in the first semi-final and 11,800 votes in the second semi-final. In addition to the performances of the competing entries, Elina Born, who represented Estonia in the Eurovision Song Contest 2015, and singers Beebilõust and Villemdrillem performed as the interval act in the first semi-final, while singer Daniel Levi and the group Curly Strings performed as the interval act in the second semi-final. The jury panel that voted in the semi-finals consisted of Kerli Kõiv, Heidy Purga, Sünne Valtri, Janika Sillamaa, Anett Kulbin, Nele Kirsipuu, Kristjan Järvi, Koit Raudsepp, Silver Laas, Andres Puusepp and Genka.

First round (jury and televote) qualifier Second round (televote-only) qualifier

Semi-final 1 (First round) – 18 February 2021
R/O	Artist	Song	Jury		Televote		Total	Place
R/O	Artist	Song	Votes	Points	Votes	Points	Total	Place
1	Tanja	"Best Night Ever"	25	1	685	2	3	10
2	Hans Nayna	"One by One"	40	3	916	4	7	8
3	Wiiralt	"Tuuled"	59	6	945	5	11	5
4	Kéa	"Hypnotized"	37	2	411	0	2	11
5	Andrei Zevakin and Pluuto	"Wingman"	14	0	1,476	8	8	6
6	Karl Killing	"Kiss Me"	54	5	1,151	7	12	4
7	Nika Marula	"Calm Down"	62	7	548	1	8	7
8	Egert Milder	"Free Again"	100	10	1,136	6	16	3
9	Tuuli Rand	"Üks öö"	9	0	278	0	0	12
10	Koit Toome	"We Could Have Been Beautiful"	111	12	2,873	12	24	1
11	Kristin Kalnapenk	"Find a Way"	51	4	705	3	7	9
12	Ivo Linna, Robert Linna and Supernova	"Ma olen siin"	76	8	1,519	10	18	2

Semi-final 1 (Second round) – 18 February 2021
Artist	Song	Televote	Place
Andrei Zevakin and Pluuto	"Wingman"	1,593	1
Hans Nayna	"One by One"	1,083	2
Kéa	"Hypnotized"	446	6
Kristin Kalnapenk	"Find a Way"	412	7
Nika Marula	"Calm Down"	686	5
Tanja	"Best Night Ever"	781	3
Tuuli Rand	"Üks öö"	164	8
Wiiralt	"Tuuled"	737	4

Semi-final 2 (First round) – 20 February 2021
R/O	Artist	Song	Jury		Televote		Total	Place
R/O	Artist	Song	Votes	Points	Votes	Points	Total	Place
1	Sissi	"Time"	44	4	1,797	5	9	7
2	Gram-Of-Fun	"Lost in a Dance"	67	8	1,403	3	11	6
3	Kadri Voorand	"Energy"	107	10	2,680	7	17	2
4	Helen	"Nii kõrgele"	3	0	1,210	2	2	10
5	Redel	"Tartu"	63	6	2,876	8	14	5
6	Rahel	"Sunday Night"	33	1	839	0	1	11
7	Uku Haasma	"Kaos"	12	0	654	0	0	12
8	Heleza	"6"	35	2	1,494	4	6	9
9	Uku Suviste	"The Lucky One"	41	3	6,291	12	15	3
10	Alabama Watchdog	"Alabama Watchdog"	64	7	1,052	1	8	8
11	Jüri Pootsmann	"Magus melanhoolia"	110	12	2,119	6	18	1
12	Suured tüdrukud	"Heaven's Not That Far Tonight"	59	5	5,370	10	15	4

Semi-final 2 (Second round) – 20 February 2021
Artist	Song	Televote	Place
Alabama Watchdog	"Alabama Watchdog"	1,022	6
Gram-Of-Fun	"Lost in a Dance"	1,771	3
Helen	"Nii kõrgele"	1,270	5
Heleza	"6"	1,345	4
Rahel	"Sunday Night"	819	7
Redel	"Tartu"	2,600	1
Sissi	"Time"	2,451	2
Uku Haasma	"Kaos"	522	8

==== Final ====
The final took place on 6 March 2021. The six entries that qualified from each of the two preceding semi-finals, all together twelve songs, competed during the show. The winner was selected over two rounds of voting. In the first round, a jury (50%) and public televote (50%) determined the top three entries to proceed to the superfinal. The public vote in the first round registered 55,956 votes. In the superfinal, "The Lucky One" performed by Uku Suviste was selected as the winner entirely by a public televote. The public televote in the superfinal registered 52,214 votes. In addition to the performances of the competing entries, singers Liis Lemsalu and Stefan as well as the groups Goresoerd, Mr. Lawrence, Pitsa and Smilers performed as the interval acts. The jury panel that voted in the first round of the final consisted of Moniqué (Lithuanian singer), Brian Henry (British keyboardist), Ben Camp (American songwriter), Sylvia Massy (American producer), Jan Frost Bors (Czech screenwriter), Stephen Budd (British producer), Helena Meraai (Belarusian singer), Pierre Dumoulin (Belgian songwriter) and Steve Rodway (British composer).

Final – 6 March 2021
R/O	Artist	Song	Jury		Televote		Total	Place
R/O	Artist	Song	Votes	Points	Votes	Points	Total	Place
1	Egert Milder	"Free Again"	24	1	1,871	1	2	12
2	Suured tüdrukud	"Heaven's Not That Far Tonight"	33	2	5,002	6	8	7
3	Hans Nayna	"One by One"	47	6	1,754	0	6	10
4	Ivo Linna, Robert Linna and Supernova	"Ma olen siin"	18	0	2,030	2	2	11
5	Karl Killing	"Kiss Me"	60	8	1,678	0	8	8
6	Uku Suviste	"The Lucky One"	42	3	11,393	12	15	1
7	Sissi	"Time"	73	12	4,186	3	15	3
8	Jüri Pootsmann	"Magus melanhoolia"	59	7	6,193	8	15	2
9	Redel	"Tartu"	17	0	5,160	7	7	9
10	Koit Toome	"We Could Have Been Beautiful"	43	4	6,779	10	14	4
11	Andrei Zevakin and Pluuto	"Wingman"	62	10	4,944	4	14	5
12	Kadri Voorand	"Energy"	44	5	4,966	5	10	6

Detailed Jury Votes
R/O	Song	Moniqué	B. Henry	B. Camp	J. F. Bors	S. Massy	S. Budd	H. Meraai	P. Dumoulin	S. Rodway	Total
1	"Free Again"	10		2	1			2	4	5	24
2	"Heaven's Not That Far Tonight"	4	3	1	6	4	1	7	3	4	33
3	"One by One"	8	6	3	5	3	6	1	7	8	47
4	"Ma olen siin"	6	1			6	5				18
5	"Kiss Me"	7	4	5	12	5	3	10	8	6	60
6	"The Lucky One"		2	4	2	10	8	3	6	7	42
7	"Time"	12	8	10	8	2	12	6	12	3	73
8	"Magus melanhoolia"	3	10		7	7	4	8	10	10	59
9	"Tartu"			8		8			1		17
10	"We Could Have Been Beautiful"	2	5	7	3	1	7	4	2	12	43
11	"Wingman"	1	7	12	10	12	2	12	5	1	62
12	"Energy"	5	12	6	4		10	5		2	44

Superfinal – 6 March 2021
R/O	Artist	Song	Televote	Place
1	Uku Suviste	"The Lucky One"	24,081	1
2	Sissi	"Time"	14,968	2
3	Jüri Pootsmann	"Magus melanhoolia"	12,776	3

== At Eurovision ==
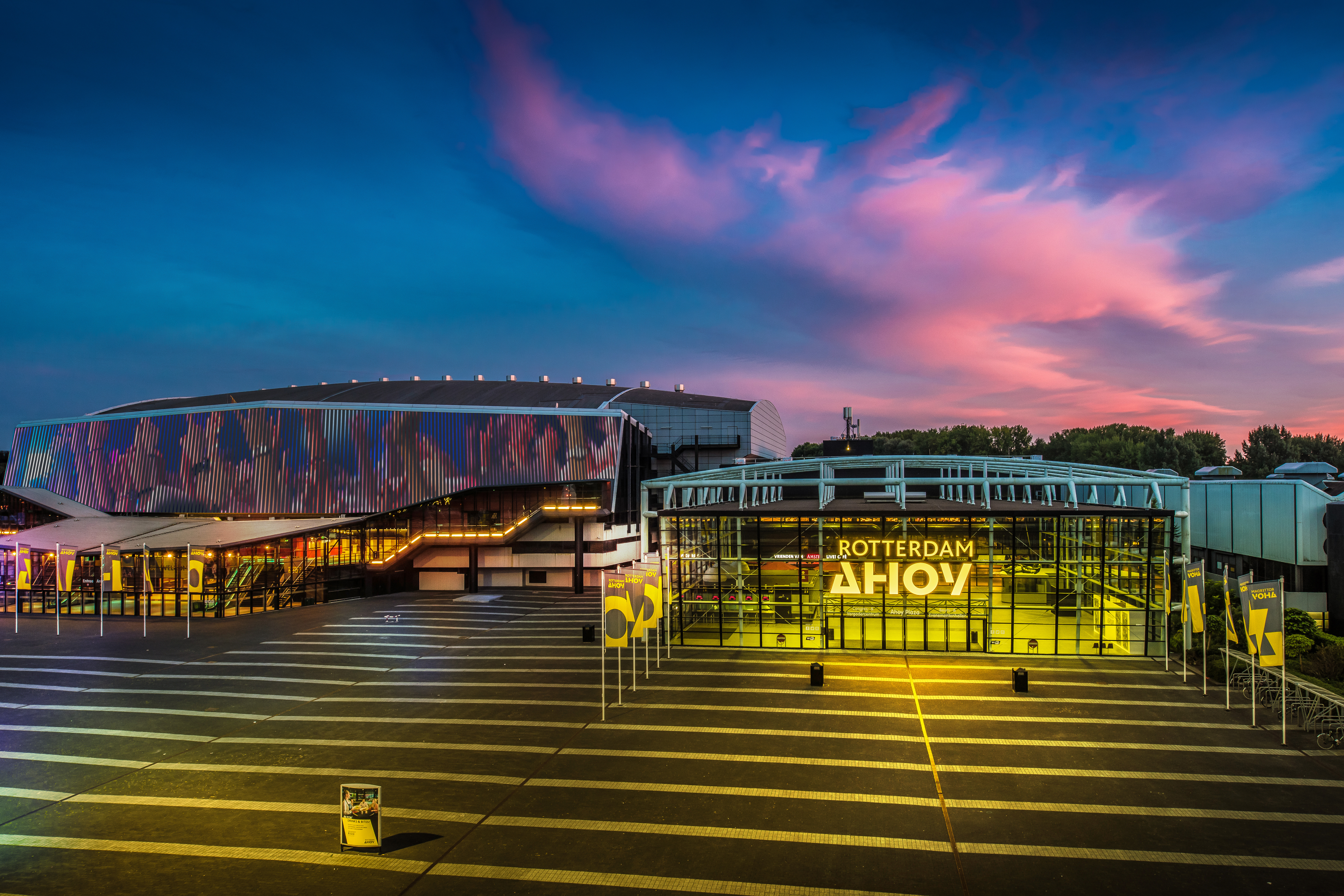
The Eurovision Song Contest 2021 took place at the Rotterdam Ahoy in Rotterdam, Netherlands

According to Eurovision rules, all nations with the exceptions of the host country and the "Big Five" (France, Germany, Italy, Spain and the United Kingdom) are required to qualify from one of two semi-finals in order to compete for the final; the top ten countries from each semi-final progress to the final. The European Broadcasting Union (EBU) split up the competing countries into six different pots based on voting patterns from previous contests, with countries with favourable voting histories put into the same pot. The semi-final allocation draw held for the Eurovision Song Contest 2020 on 28 January 2020 was used for the 2021 contest, which Estonia was placed into the second semi-final, to be held on 20 May 2021, and was scheduled to perform in the first half of the show.

Once all the competing songs for the 2021 contest had been released, the running order for the semi-finals was decided by the shows' producers rather than through another draw, so that similar songs were not placed next to each other. Estonia was set to perform in position 2, following the entry from San Marino and before the entry from Czech Republic.

The two semi-finals and the final were broadcast in Estonia on ETV with commentary in Estonian by Marko Reikop, and on ETV+ with commentary in Russian by Aleksandr Hobotov and Julia Kalenda. For the first time in the history of the contest, all three shows were broadcast in Estonia with Estonian sign language translation provided by twenty interpreters. The Estonian spokesperson, who announced the top 12-point score awarded by the Estonian jury during the final, was Sissi.

=== Semi-final ===
Uku Suviste took part in technical rehearsals on 10 and 13 May, followed by dress rehearsals on 19 and 20 May. This included the jury show on 19 May where the professional juries of each country watched and voted on the competing entries.

The Estonian performance featured Uku Suviste performing on stage in a white loose bowtie outfit with the stage displaying dark blue colours and a large moon graphic with lightning effects appearing on the LED screens alongside water effects appearing on the LED floor. The stage director for the Estonian performance was Dan Shipton and Marvin Dietmann. Uku Suviste was joined by a backing vocalist: Kaarel Orumägi.

At the end of the show, Estonia was not announced among the top 10 entries in the first semi-final and therefore failed to qualify to compete in the final. It was later revealed that Estonia placed 13th in the semi-final, receiving a total of 58 points: 29 points from both the televoting and the juries.

=== Voting ===
Voting during the three shows involved each country awarding two sets of points from 1-8, 10 and 12: one from their professional jury and the other from televoting. Each nation's jury consisted of five music industry professionals who are citizens of the country they represent. This jury judged each entry based on: vocal capacity; the stage performance; the song's composition and originality; and the overall impression by the act. In addition, each member of a national jury may only take part in the panel once every three years, and no jury was permitted to discuss of their vote with other members or be related in any way to any of the competing acts in such a way that they cannot vote impartially and independently. The individual rankings of each jury member in an anonymised form as well as the nation's televoting results were released shortly after the grand final.

Below is a breakdown of points awarded to Estonia and awarded by Estonia in the second semi-final and grand final of the contest, and the breakdown of the jury voting and televoting conducted during the two shows:

==== Points awarded to Estonia ====
Points awarded to Estonia (Semi-final 2)
Score	Televote	Jury
12 points		
10 points	Latvia	
8 points		
7 points	Finland	Bulgaria
6 points	Denmark	
5 points		
4 points		Poland
3 points	Moldova	Georgia; Latvia; Moldova; Switzerland
2 points		United Kingdom
1 point	Bulgaria; Czech Republic; Switzerland	Greece; Portugal; Serbia; Spain

==== Points awarded by Estonia ====
Points awarded by Estonia (Semi-final 2)
Score	Televote	Jury
12 points	Moldova	Switzerland
10 points	Finland	Bulgaria
8 points	Denmark	Iceland
7 points	Iceland	Finland
6 points	Switzerland	Portugal
5 points	Portugal	Serbia
4 points	San Marino	Austria
3 points	Georgia	Greece
2 points	Bulgaria	Albania
1 point	Latvia	San Marino

Points awarded by Estonia (Final)
Score	Televote	Jury
12 points	Finland	Switzerland
10 points	Lithuania	France
8 points	Italy	Iceland
7 points	France	Finland
6 points	Russia	Bulgaria
5 points	Ukraine	Portugal
4 points	Norway	Ukraine
3 points	Iceland	Italy
2 points	Switzerland	Lithuania
1 point	Sweden	Malta

==== Detailed voting results ====
The following members comprised the Estonian jury:

- Dave Benton
- Elina Born
- Stig Rästa
- Karl-Ander Reismann
- Birgit Sarrap

Detailed voting results from Estonia (Semi-final 2)
R/O	Country	Jury							Televote	
R/O	Country	Juror A	Juror B	Juror C	Juror D	Juror E	Rank	Points	Rank	Points
01	San Marino	10	7	7	11	13	10	1	7	4
02	Estonia									
03	Czech Republic	9	14	15	8	10	11		16	
04	Greece	7	8	12	7	7	8	3	11	
05	Austria	13	6	9	5	6	7	4	12	
06	Poland	15	16	16	13	15	16		15	
07	Moldova	14	13	13	10	11	13		1	12
08	Iceland	3	1	4	2	9	3	8	4	7
09	Serbia	5	11	2	16	5	6	5	14	
10	Georgia	12	10	8	15	14	12		8	3
11	Albania	8	9	6	14	8	9	2	13	
12	Portugal	6	3	5	4	4	5	6	6	5
13	Bulgaria	4	4	3	3	2	2	10	9	2
14	Finland	1	5	11	6	1	4	7	2	10
15	Latvia	11	15	10	12	16	15		10	1
16	Switzerland	2	2	1	1	3	1	12	5	6
17	Denmark	16	12	14	9	12	14		3	8

Detailed voting results from Estonia (Final)
R/O	Country	Jury							Televote	
R/O	Country	Juror A	Juror B	Juror C	Juror D	Juror E	Rank	Points	Rank	Points
01	Cyprus	20	8	10	12	24	14		16	
02	Albania	14	20	16	18	20	21		25	
03	Israel	13	11	14	8	13	13		21	
04	Belgium	16	10	15	16	21	19		15	
05	Russia	23	23	6	22	12	17		5	6
06	Malta	18	9	17	7	9	10	1	13	
07	Portugal	17	3	11	5	6	6	5	12	
08	Serbia	10	14	5	19	16	11		23	
09	United Kingdom	19	22	20	17	17	25		22	
10	Greece	9	17	18	9	22	18		17	
11	Switzerland	1	2	2	1	3	1	12	9	2
12	Iceland	2	4	8	3	7	3	8	8	3
13	Spain	4	24	23	13	19	12		24	
14	Moldova	25	26	25	25	26	26		19	
15	Germany	26	25	26	24	11	24		18	
16	Finland	3	7	9	6	1	4	7	1	12
17	Bulgaria	6	6	4	2	8	5	6	11	
18	Lithuania	12	12	7	10	10	9	2	2	10
19	Ukraine	7	13	1	20	23	7	4	6	5
20	France	5	1	3	4	2	2	10	4	7
21	Azerbaijan	22	18	12	26	18	23		14	
22	Norway	11	19	21	23	25	22		7	4
23	Netherlands	21	21	24	15	5	15		26	
24	Italy	15	5	13	21	4	8	3	3	8
25	Sweden	8	15	22	11	14	16		10	1
26	San Marino	24	16	19	14	15	20		20	
