= United Kingdom in the Eurovision Song Contest 2021 =

- Eurovision Song Contest 2021
- Participating broadcaster: British Broadcasting Corporation (BBC)
- Country: United Kingdom
- Selection process: Internal selection
- Announcement date: Artist: 19 February 2021; Song: 11 March 2021

Competing entry
- Song: "Embers"
- Artist: James Newman
- Songwriters: James Newman; Conor Blake; Danny Shah; Tom Hollings; Samuel Brennan

Placement
- Final result: 26th, 0 points

Participation chronology

The United Kingdom was represented at the Eurovision Song Contest 2021 with the song "Embers" written by James Newman, Conor Blake, Danny Shah, Tom Hollings, and Samuel Brennan, and performed by Newman himself. The British participating broadcaster, the British Broadcasting Corporation (BBC), internally selected both the song and the performer, after Newman was due to compete in the 2020 contest with "My Last Breath" before the event's cancellation. Newman was announced as the British entrant on 19 February 2021, while the song "Embers" was presented to the public on 11 March 2021.

As a member of the "Big Five", the United Kingdom automatically qualified to compete in the final of the Eurovision Song Contest. Performing in position 9, the United Kingdom placed 26th (last) out of the 26 participating countries, failing to score any points. This was the fifth time the nation had placed last in the history of the competition, and the second time the nation received nul points. The United Kingdom was also the first country to have received nul points since the implementation of the new system in 2016.

== Background ==
Prior to the 2021 contest, the British Broadcasting Corporation (BBC) had participated in the Eurovision Song Contest representing the United Kingdom sixty-two times. Thus far, it has won the contest five times: in 1967 with the song "Puppet on a String" performed by Sandie Shaw, in 1969 with the song "Boom Bang-a-Bang" performed by Lulu, in 1976 with the song "Save Your Kisses for Me" performed by Brotherhood of Man, in 1981 with the song "Making Your Mind Up" performed by Bucks Fizz, and in 1997 with the song "Love Shine a Light" performed by Katrina and the Waves. To this point, the nation is noted for having finished as the runner-up in a record fifteen contests. Up to and including 1998, the UK had only twice finished outside the top 10, in 1978 and 1987. Since 1999, the year in which the rule was abandoned that songs must be performed in one of the official languages of the country participating, the UK has had less success, thus far only finishing within the top ten twice: in 2002 with the song "Come Back" performed by Jessica Garlick and in 2009 with the song "It's My Time" performed by Jade Ewen. For the 2019 contest, the United Kingdom finished in twenty-sixth (last) place out of twenty-six competing entries with the song "Bigger than Us" performed by Michael Rice.

As part of its duties as participating broadcaster, the BBC organises the selection of its entry in the Eurovision Song Contest and broadcasts the event in the country. The broadcaster announced that it would participate in the 2021 contest on 26 October 2020. Since 2016, BBC organised a national final featuring a competition among several artists and songs, while the broadcaster opted to internally select the British entry in 2020. The internal selection procedure was continued for their 2021 entry.

== Before Eurovision ==
=== Internal selection ===
On 19 February 2021, BBC confirmed that James Newman would represent the United Kingdom at the Eurovision Song Contest 2021. Collaboration between BBC Studios and record label BMG was also renewed. In regards to his re-selection as the British entrant, Newman stated: "I'm so excited and honoured to be getting a second chance at representing my country in the Eurovision Song Contest. I haven't stopped making new music in lockdown and I can't wait for everyone to hear the song I’m taking to Eurovision in 2021."

On 11 March 2021, the song "Embers" written by James Newman together with Conor Blake, Danny Shah, Tom Hollings and Samuel Brennan was presented to the public through the release of the official music video, which was directed by Charlie Lightening and filmed at RAF Greenham Common in Newbury, Berkshire, via the official Eurovision Song Contest's YouTube channel. In regards to the song, Newman stated: "I feel like everyone wants a party and to have some fun so when I was writing, that's what I had in my head. I wanted something people can dance to, even if it's just in their kitchen".

=== Promotion ===
James Newman specifically promoted "Embers" as the British Eurovision entry by performing during several online international events, including the Concert in the Dark on 21 April which was organised by Eurovoix, the PrePartyES on 24 April which was organised by eurovision-spain.com, and the Adriatic PreParty on 1 May which was organised by Hrvatski Eurovizijski Klub.

== At Eurovision ==
According to Eurovision rules, all nations with the exceptions of the host country and the "Big Five" (France, Germany, Italy, Spain and the United Kingdom) are required to compete in one of two semi-finals, and qualify in order to participate in the final; the top ten countries from each semi-final progress to the final. As a member of the "Big Five", the United Kingdom automatically qualified to compete in the final on 22 May 2021. In addition to their participation in the final, the United Kingdom is also required to broadcast and vote in one of the two semi-finals. For the 2021 contest, the semi-final allocation draw held for 2020 which was held on 28 January 2020, was used. The United Kingdom was assigned to broadcast and vote in the second semi-final on 20 May 2021.

In the United Kingdom, the semi-finals were broadcast on BBC Four with commentary by Scott Mills, Sara Cox and Chelcee Grimes in London, while the final was televised on BBC One with commentary by Graham Norton in Rotterdam; it was also broadcast on BBC Radio 2 with commentary by Ken Bruce, who was also based in London. Rylan Clark-Neal was initially announced as one of the commentators for the semi-finals, however he was replaced by Cox due to illness. The British spokesperson, who announced the top 12-point score awarded by the British jury during the final, was Amanda Holden.

=== Final ===
After technical rehearsals were held on 15 May, the "Big Five" countries and host country Netherlands held a press conference. As part of this press conference, the artists took part in a draw to determine which half of the grand final they would subsequently participate in. The United Kingdom was drawn to compete in the first half. Following the conclusion of the second semi-final, the shows' producers decided upon the running order of the final. The running order for the semi-finals and final was decided by the shows' producers rather than through another draw, so that similar songs were not placed next to each other. The United Kingdom was subsequently placed to perform in position 9, following the entry from Serbia and before the entry from Greece. The United Kingdom placed twenty-sixth (last) in the final, failing to score any points from both the televoting and the juries. This was the fifth time the United Kingdom finished in last place and the second time the nation received nul points, the previous occasion being in 2003. The United Kingdom was also the first country to have received nul points since the implementation of the new system in 2016.

=== Voting ===
Voting during the three shows involved each country awarding two sets of points from 1-8, 10 and 12: one from their professional jury and the other from televoting. Each nation's jury consisted of five music industry professionals who are citizens of the country they represent, with a diversity in gender and age represented. The judges assess each entry based on the performances during the second Dress Rehearsal of each show, which takes place the night before each live show, against a set of criteria including: vocal capacity; the stage performance; the song's composition and originality; and the overall impression by the act. Jury members may only take part in panel once every three years, and are obliged to confirm that they are not connected to any of the participating acts in a way that would impact their ability to vote impartially. Jury members should also vote independently, with no discussion of their vote permitted with other jury members. The exact composition of the professional jury, and the results of each country's jury and televoting were released after the grand final; the individual results from each jury member were also released in an anonymised form.

Below is a breakdown of points awarded to the United Kingdom and awarded by United Kingdom in the second semi-final and grand final of the contest, and the breakdown of the jury voting and televoting conducted during the two shows:

==== Points awarded to the United Kingdom ====
In the final, the United Kingdom did not receive any points from the juries or in the televote.

==== Points awarded by the United Kingdom ====
Points awarded by the United Kingdom (Semi-final 2)
Score	Televote	Jury
12 points	Iceland	Iceland
10 points	Bulgaria	Portugal
8 points	Finland	Switzerland
7 points	Poland	Bulgaria
6 points	Portugal	Finland
5 points	Denmark	Serbia
4 points	Latvia	San Marino
3 points	Switzerland	Moldova
2 points	San Marino	Estonia
1 point	Greece	Albania

Points awarded by the United Kingdom (Final)
Score	Televote	Jury
12 points	Lithuania	France
10 points	Iceland	Iceland
8 points	Bulgaria	Switzerland
7 points	Finland	Portugal
6 points	Malta	Israel
5 points	France	Bulgaria
4 points	Ukraine	Finland
3 points	Italy	San Marino
2 points	Norway	Spain
1 point	Switzerland	Belgium

==== Detailed voting results ====
The following members comprised the British jury:

- Nicki Chapman – Radio DJ, broadcaster, TV presenter
- Tom Aspaul – singer-songwriter
- Ross Gautreau – record label owner, producer
- Michelle Gayle – singer-songwriter, actress
- Aisha Jawando – actress, musician

Detailed voting results from the United Kingdom (Semi-final 2)
R/O	Country	Jury							Televote	
R/O	Country	Juror A	Juror B	Juror C	Juror D	Juror E	Rank	Points	Rank	Points
01	San Marino	4	7	7	6	6	7	4	9	2
02	Estonia	10	16	4	9	13	9	2	14	
03	Czech Republic	11	11	9	17	10	12		16	
04	Greece	12	9	13	11	15	13		10	1
05	Austria	13	6	10	12	8	11		15	
06	Poland	7	15	14	13	16	14		4	7
07	Moldova	14	1	15	16	11	8	3	11	
08	Iceland	3	2	1	1	1	1	12	1	12
09	Serbia	6	5	8	3	5	6	5	12	
10	Georgia	15	17	11	15	17	17		17	
11	Albania	9	10	12	8	7	10	1	13	
12	Portugal	1	8	3	2	2	2	10	5	6
13	Bulgaria	5	4	5	7	3	4	7	2	10
14	Finland	2	12	6	5	4	5	6	3	8
15	Latvia	17	13	17	14	12	16		7	4
16	Switzerland	8	3	2	4	9	3	8	8	3
17	Denmark	16	14	16	10	14	15		6	5

Detailed voting results from the United Kingdom (Final)
R/O	Country	Jury							Televote	
R/O	Country	Juror A	Juror B	Juror C	Juror D	Juror E	Rank	Points	Rank	Points
01	Cyprus	15	23	17	14	13	21		13	
02	Albania	21	15	16	18	19	22		21	
03	Israel	1	5	11	11	12	5	6	18	
04	Belgium	11	6	9	6	22	10	1	25	
05	Russia	17	7	13	16	18	15		14	
06	Malta	12	18	15	10	11	16		5	6
07	Portugal	2	19	5	9	3	4	7	11	
08	Serbia	19	11	18	8	4	12		23	
09	United Kingdom									
10	Greece	18	12	22	12	23	20		16	
11	Switzerland	9	3	1	3	14	3	8	10	1
12	Iceland	5	14	2	1	1	2	10	2	10
13	Spain	8	17	12	5	7	9	2	24	
14	Moldova	23	2	23	17	21	13		20	
15	Germany	16	25	24	23	15	24		15	
16	Finland	3	16	4	13	8	7	4	4	7
17	Bulgaria	13	4	6	7	5	6	5	3	8
18	Lithuania	22	13	21	20	25	23		1	12
19	Ukraine	24	8	20	24	20	18		7	4
20	France	4	1	3	2	2	1	12	6	5
21	Azerbaijan	25	9	19	22	17	19		19	
22	Norway	20	22	25	25	16	25		9	2
23	Netherlands	6	20	8	21	6	11		22	
24	Italy	14	24	14	15	9	17		8	3
25	Sweden	7	21	7	19	24	14		12	
26	San Marino	10	10	10	4	10	8	3	17	
