= Finland in the Eurovision Song Contest 2021 =

- Eurovision Song Contest 2021
- Participating broadcaster: Yleisradio (Yle)
- Country: Finland
- Selection process: Uuden Musiikin Kilpailu 2021
- Selection date: 20 February 2021

Competing entry
- Song: "Dark Side"
- Artist: Blind Channel
- Songwriters: Aleksi Kaunisvesi; Joel Hokka; Joonas Porko; Niko Moilanen; Olli Matela

Placement
- Semi-final result: Qualified (5th, 234 points)
- Final result: 6th, 301 points

Participation chronology

Finland was represented at the Eurovision Song Contest 2021 with the song "Dark Side", written by Aleksi Kaunisvesi, Joonas Porko, Joel Hokka, Niko Moilanen, and Olli Matela, and performed by the band Blind Channel. The Finnish participating broadcaster, Yleisradio (Yle), organised the national final Uuden Musiikin Kilpailu 2021 in order to select its entry for the contest. Seven entries were selected to compete in the national final on 20 February 2021 where the combination of votes from seven international jury groups and votes from the public selected "Dark Side" performed by Blind Channel as the winner.

Finland was drawn to compete in the second semi-final of the Eurovision Song Contest which took place on 20 May 2021. Performing during the show in position 14, "Dark Side" was announced among the top 10 entries of the second semi-final and therefore qualified to compete in the final on 22 May. It was later revealed that Finland placed fifth out of the 17 participating countries in the semi-final with 234 points. In the final, Finland performed in position 16 and placed sixth out of the 26 participating countries, scoring 301 points.

== Background ==
Prior to the 2021 Contest, Yleisradio (Yle) had participated in the Eurovision Song Contest representing Finland fifty-three times since its first entry in 1961. It has won the contest once in 2006 with the song "Hard Rock Hallelujah" performed by Lordi. In 2019, "Look Away" performed by Darude featuring Sebastian Rejman failed to qualify Finland to the final, placing seventeenth (last) in the semi-final. In 2020, Aksel Kankaanranta was set to represent Finland with the song "Looking Back" before the contest's cancellation.

As part of its duties as participating broadcaster, Yle organises the selection of its entry in the Eurovision Song Contest and broadcasts the event in the country. The broadcaster confirmed its intentions to participate at the 2021 contest on 7 March 2020. Yle had selected its entries for the contest through national final competitions that have varied in format over the years. Between 1961 and 2011, a selection show that was often titled Euroviisukarsinta highlighted that the purpose of the program was to select a song for Eurovision. However, since 2012, the broadcaster has organised the selection show Uuden Musiikin Kilpailu (UMK), which focuses on showcasing new music with the winning song being selected as the Finnish entry for that year. Along with its participation confirmation, the broadcaster also announced that its entry for the 2021 contest would be selected through Uuden Musiikin Kilpailu 2021.

== Before Eurovision ==
=== Uuden Musiikin Kilpailu 2021 ===
Uuden Musiikin Kilpailu 2021 was the tenth edition of Uuden Musiikin Kilpailu (UMK), the music competition that selects Finland's entries for the Eurovision Song Contest. The competition consisted of a final on 20 February 2021, held at the Mediapolis in Tampere and hosted by Antti Tuisku. The show was broadcast on Yle TV1 with a second audio program providing commentary in Finnish by Mikko Silvennoinen, in Swedish by Eva Frantz and Johan Lindroos, in Russian by Levan Tvaltvadze and in English by Katri Norrlin and Jani Kareinen, as well as online at Yle Areena. The competition was also broadcast via radio on Yle Radio Suomi and with commentary in Swedish by Eva Frantz and Johan Lindroos on Yle X3M. The competition was watched by 1.1 million viewers in Finland, making it the most watched edition of UMK since its establishment in 2012.

==== Competing entries ====
A submission period was opened by Yle which lasted between 1 September 2020 and 7 September 2020. At least one of the writers and the lead singer(s) had to hold Finnish citizenship or live in Finland permanently in order for the entry to qualify to compete. A panel of eight experts appointed by Yle selected seven entries for the competition from the 278 received submissions. The experts were Tapio Hakanen (Head of Music at YleX), Anssi Autio (UMK producer), Juha-Matti Valtonen (television director), Samuli Väänänen (Senior Editor at Spotify Finland), Mirva Merimaa (CEO of Tiketti), Katri Norrlin (music journalist at YleX), Jani Kareinen (music journalist at YleX), Johan Lindroos (Head of Music at Yle Radio Suomi) and Amie Borgar (Head of Music at Yle X3M). The competing entries were presented on 13 January 2021, while their lyric videos were released between 14 and 22 January 2021. Among the competing artists was Laura, who represented Estonia in the Eurovision Song Contest 2005 and 2017, and Aksel, who was to represent Finland in the Eurovision Song Contest 2020 before the contest was cancelled.

Artist	Song	Songwriter(s)
Aksel	"Hurt"	Gerard O'Connell, Kalle Lindroth, Joonas Angeria
Blind Channel	"Dark Side"	Aleksi Kaunisvesi, Joel Hokka, Joonas Porko, Niko Moilanen, Olli Matela
Danny	"Sinä päivänä kun kaikki rakastaa mua"	Janne Rintala
Ilta	"Kelle mä soitan"	Ilta Fuchs, Väinö Wallenius, Jouni Aslak, Tuomas Kauhanen
Laura	"Play"	Karl-Ander Reismann, Reinis Straume, Laura Põldvere
Oskr	"Lie"	Oskari Ruohonen, Joonas Angeria, David Pramik
Teflon Brothers and Pandora	"I Love You"	Jaakko Salovaara, Axel Ehnström, Mikko Kuoppala, Heikki Kuula, Jani Tuohimaa, Anneli Magnusson

==== Final ====
The final took place on 20 February 2021 where seven entries competed. "Dark Side" performed by Blind Channel was selected as the winner by a combination of public votes (75%) and seven international jury groups from Iceland, Netherlands, Poland, Spain, Switzerland, the United Kingdom and the United States (25%). The viewers had a total of 882 points to award, while the juries had a total of 294 points to award. Each jury group distributed their points as follows: 2, 4, 6, 8, 10 and 12 points. The viewer vote was based on the percentage of votes each song achieved through the following voting methods: telephone, SMS and app voting. For example, if a song gained 10% of the viewer vote, then that entry would be awarded 10% of 882 points rounded to the nearest integer: 88 points. A total of 138,195 votes were cast during the show: 46,178 votes through telephone and SMS and 92,017 votes through the Yle app.

In addition to the performances of the competing entries, the show was opened by Antti Tuisku and Erika Vikman, while the interval act featured Haloo Helsinki! performing their single "Piilotan mun kyyneleet" and Antti Tuisku performing a medley of his songs.

Final – 20 February 2021
R/O	Artist	Song	Jury	Televote			Total	Place
R/O	Artist	Song	Jury	Votes	Percentage	Points	Total	Place
1	Teflon Brothers and Pandora	"I Love You"	30	23,493	17.0%	150	180	2
2	Aksel	"Hurt"	56	8,154	5.9%	52	108	5
3	Laura	"Play"	4	1,382	1.0%	9	13	7
4	Danny	"Sinä päivänä kun kaikki rakastaa mua"	22	5,942	4.3%	38	60	6
5	Oskr	"Lie"	62	8,292	6.0%	53	115	4
6	Blind Channel	"Dark Side"	72	75,040	54.3%	479	551	1
7	Ilta	"Kelle mä soitan"	48	15,892	11.5%	101	149	3

Detailed International Jury Votes
R/O	Song	United Kingdom	Switzerland	United States	Poland	Iceland	Spain	Netherlands	Total
R/O	Song	United Kingdom	Switzerland	United States	Poland	Iceland	Spain	Netherlands	Total
1	"I Love You"	6	2	2		6	4	10	30
2	"Hurt"	10	12	8	8	4	8	6	56
3	"Play"				2		2		4
4	"Sinä päivänä kun kaikki rakastaa mua"	4	4	4	4	2		4	22
5	"Lie"	8	10	10	10	12	10	2	62
6	"Dark Side"	12	8	12	12	8	12	8	72
7	"Kelle mä soitan"	2	6	6	6	10	6	12	48
International Jury Spokespersons
United Kingdom – William Lee Adams; Switzerland – Zibbz; United States – Carlton Wilborn; Poland – Lanberry; Iceland – Klemens Hannigan; Spain – Soraya Arnelas; Netherlands – Katja Zwart

International Jury Members
Country	Members
United Kingdom	William Lee Adams; Ricardo Autobahn; Michael James Down; Katya Edwards
Switzerland	Daniel Meister; Corinne Gfeller; Stee Gfeller; Pele Loriano
United States	Carlton Wilborn; Robin Antin; Tayla Parx; Brett McLaughlin
Poland	Małgorzata Uściłowska; Monika Malec; Filip Siejka; Mikołaj Trybulec
Iceland	Felix Bergsson; Klemens Hannigan; Margrét Blöndal; Erla Stefánsdóttir
Spain	Victor Escudero; Soraya Arnelas; Raúl López Vázquez; Julia Varela
Netherlands	Erik Bolks; Katja Zwart; Jade van Baest; Jeffrey van Hest

== At Eurovision ==
According to Eurovision rules, all nations with the exceptions of the host country and the "Big Five" (France, Germany, Italy, Spain and the United Kingdom) are required to qualify from one of two semi-finals in order to compete for the final; the top ten countries from each semi-final progress to the final. The European Broadcasting Union (EBU) split up the competing countries into six different pots based on voting patterns from previous contests, with countries with favourable voting histories put into the same pot. The semi-final allocation draw held for the Eurovision Song Contest 2020 on 28 January 2020 was used for the 2021 contest, which Finland was placed into the second semi-final, to be held on 20 May 2021, and was scheduled to perform in the second half of the show.

Once all the competing songs for the 2021 contest had been released, the running order for the semi-finals was decided by the shows' producers rather than through another draw, so that similar songs were not placed next to each other. Finland was set to perform in position 14, following the entry from Bulgaria and before the entry from Latvia.

The two semi-finals and the final were televised in Finland on Yle TV1 with a second audio program providing commentary in Finnish by Mikko Silvennoinen, in Swedish by Eva Frantz and Johan Lindroos and in Russian by Levan Tvaltvadze. The three shows were broadcast via radio with Finnish commentary by Sanna Pirkkalainen and Toni Laaksonen on Yle Radio Suomi and with Swedish commentary by Eva Frantz and Johan Lindroos on Yle X3M. The Finnish spokesperson, who announced the top 12-point score awarded by the Finnish jury during the final, was Katri Norrlin.

=== Semi-final ===
Finland performed fourteenth in the second semi-final, following the entry from Bulgaria and preceding the entry from Latvia. At the end of the show, Finland was announced as having finished in the top 10 and subsequently qualifying for the grand final. It was later revealed that Finland placed fifth in the semi-final, receiving a total of 234 points: 150 points from the televoting and 84 from the juries.

=== Final ===
Shortly after the second semi-final, a winners' press conference was held for the ten qualifying countries. As part of this press conference, the qualifying artists took part in a draw to determine which half of the grand final they would subsequently participate in. Finland was drawn to compete in the second half. Following this draw, the shows' producers decided upon the running order of the final, as they had done for the semi-finals. Finland was subsequently placed to perform in position 16, following the entry from Germany and before the entry from Bulgaria. Finland placed sixth in the final, scoring 301 points: 218 points from the televoting and 83 from the juries.

=== Voting ===
Voting during the three shows involved each country awarding two sets of points from 1-8, 10 and 12: one from their professional jury and the other from televoting. Each nation's jury consisted of five music industry professionals who are citizens of the country they represent. This jury judged each entry based on: vocal capacity; the stage performance; the song's composition and originality; and the overall impression by the act. In addition, each member of a national jury may only take part in the panel once every three years, and no jury was permitted to discuss of their vote with other members or be related in any way to any of the competing acts in such a way that they cannot vote impartially and independently. The individual rankings of each jury member in an anonymised form as well as the nation's televoting results were released shortly after the grand final.

Below is a breakdown of points awarded to Finland and awarded by Finland in the second semi-final and grand final of the contest, and the breakdown of the jury voting and televoting conducted during the two shows:

==== Points awarded to Finland ====
Points awarded to Finland (Semi-final 2)
Score	Televote	Jury
12 points	Bulgaria; Poland	
10 points	Denmark; Estonia; Iceland; San Marino; Serbia	
8 points	Czech Republic; Greece; Latvia; Moldova; United Kingdom	
7 points		Denmark; Estonia; France; Latvia
6 points	Georgia; Portugal; Spain; Switzerland	Albania; Czech Republic; Iceland; Portugal; Serbia; Switzerland; United Kingdom
5 points	Albania; Austria	Austria
4 points		Georgia
3 points		San Marino
2 points	France	Poland
1 point		

Points awarded to Finland (Final)
Score	Televote	Jury
12 points	Estonia; Iceland; Sweden	
10 points		Italy; Serbia
8 points	Bulgaria; Germany; Italy; Latvia; Russia; Ukraine	Belgium; Denmark; Romania
7 points	Denmark; Lithuania; Malta; Serbia; United Kingdom	Estonia
6 points	Belgium; Croatia; Greece; Norway; Poland; Romania	
5 points	Azerbaijan; Ireland; Moldova; Portugal	Iceland
4 points	Austria; Cyprus; Czech Republic; Israel; Netherlands; San Marino; Slovenia; Switzerland	Latvia; Slovenia; United Kingdom
3 points	Albania; Australia	Albania; Cyprus
2 points	North Macedonia; Spain	Malta; Poland
1 point	France	Austria; Bulgaria; Czech Republic; San Marino; Switzerland

==== Points awarded by Finland ====
Points awarded by Finland (Semi-final 2)
Score	Televote	Jury
12 points	Iceland	Bulgaria
10 points	Switzerland	Switzerland
8 points	Denmark	Iceland
7 points	Estonia	Portugal
6 points	Portugal	Greece
5 points	Moldova	Austria
4 points	Bulgaria	Albania
3 points	Albania	Serbia
2 points	Greece	San Marino
1 point	San Marino	Denmark

Points awarded by Finland (Final)
Score	Televote	Jury
12 points	Iceland	Switzerland
10 points	Ukraine	Bulgaria
8 points	Italy	Iceland
7 points	Switzerland	France
6 points	France	Italy
5 points	Lithuania	Sweden
4 points	Norway	Russia
3 points	Sweden	Lithuania
2 points	Moldova	Greece
1 point	Russia	Malta

==== Detailed voting results ====
The following members comprised the Finnish jury:

- Amie Borgar
- Jussi Mäntysaari
- Mirva Merimaa
- Tommi Tuomainen
- Samuli Väänänen

Detailed voting results from Finland (Semi-final 2)
R/O	Country	Jury							Televote	
R/O	Country	Juror A	Juror B	Juror C	Juror D	Juror E	Rank	Points	Rank	Points
01	San Marino	5	12	14	9	7	9	2	10	1
02	Estonia	11	11	8	6	15	12		4	7
03	Czech Republic	14	16	10	5	16	13		15	
04	Greece	4	6	6	8	10	5	6	9	2
05	Austria	6	8	7	12	6	6	5	14	
06	Poland	12	15	13	14	11	16		16	
07	Moldova	13	9	12	11	9	14		6	5
08	Iceland	3	5	3	1	2	3	8	1	12
09	Serbia	9	10	9	16	4	8	3	11	
10	Georgia	16	14	15	7	14	15		12	
11	Albania	10	4	11	10	8	7	4	8	3
12	Portugal	7	7	5	4	5	4	7	5	6
13	Bulgaria	2	1	2	2	1	1	12	7	4
14	Finland									
15	Latvia	15	3	16	13	12	11		13	
16	Switzerland	1	2	1	3	3	2	10	2	10
17	Denmark	8	13	4	15	13	10	1	3	8

Detailed voting results from Finland (Final)
R/O	Country	Jury							Televote	
R/O	Country	Juror A	Juror B	Juror C	Juror D	Juror E	Rank	Points	Rank	Points
01	Cyprus	20	22	22	15	16	22		17	
02	Albania	9	9	16	24	11	14		18	
03	Israel	17	6	15	13	7	11		21	
04	Belgium	15	13	9	17	12	15		14	
05	Russia	24	3	18	9	8	7	4	10	1
06	Malta	6	11	21	22	6	10	1	11	
07	Portugal	11	15	12	8	10	13		12	
08	Serbia	12	21	14	25	9	18		22	
09	United Kingdom	19	25	23	12	17	20		25	
10	Greece	8	7	8	10	14	9	2	13	
11	Switzerland	4	2	1	3	1	1	12	4	7
12	Iceland	5	10	3	1	5	3	8	1	12
13	Spain	21	17	7	18	13	17		24	
14	Moldova	23	20	25	21	25	25		9	2
15	Germany	22	16	17	20	18	23		19	
16	Finland									
17	Bulgaria	2	1	2	5	2	2	10	16	
18	Lithuania	10	5	11	7	20	8	3	6	5
19	Ukraine	25	12	5	11	15	12		2	10
20	France	1	18	4	6	3	4	7	5	6
21	Azerbaijan	13	24	24	16	24	21		15	
22	Norway	16	23	6	14	23	16		7	4
23	Netherlands	18	8	20	19	21	19		23	
24	Italy	3	4	10	4	4	5	6	3	8
25	Sweden	7	14	13	2	19	6	5	8	3
26	San Marino	14	19	19	23	22	24		20	
