= The Ride (Rafał Brzozowski song) =

2021 song by Rafał Brzozowski

Single by Rafał Brzozowski
- Released: 12 March 2021
- Studio: Softwall Studio
- Length: 3:00
- Label: Synthwave
- Songwriters: Joakim Övrenius; Thomas Karlsson; Clara Rubensson; Johan Mauritzson
- Producer: Joakim Övrenius

Rafał Brzozowski singles chronology
"Gentleman" (2020)	"The Ride" (2021)	"Głośniej" (2021)

Music video
- "The Ride" on YouTube

Eurovision Song Contest 2021 entry
- Country: Poland
- Artist: Rafał Brzozowski
- Language: English
- Lyricists: Joakim Övrenius; Thomas Karlsson; Clara Rubensson; Johan Mauritzson

Finals performance
- Semi-final result: 14th
- Semi-final points: 35

Entry chronology
- ◄ "Empires" (2020)
- "River" (2022) ►

"The Ride" is a song by Polish singer Rafał Brzozowski. The song represented Poland in the Eurovision Song Contest 2021 in Rotterdam, the Netherlands.

== Eurovision Song Contest ==
=== Internal selection ===
On 12 March 2021, Telewizja Polska confirmed that Rafał Brzozowski would represent Poland in the 2021 contest.

=== At Eurovision ===
The 65th edition of the Eurovision Song Contest took place in Rotterdam, the Netherlands and consisted of two semi-finals on 18 and 20 May 2021, and the grand final on 22 May 2021. According to the Eurovision rules, all participating countries, except the host nation and the "Big Five", consisting of France, Germany, Italy, Spain and the United Kingdom, are required to qualify from one of two semi-finals to compete for the final, although the top 10 countries from the respective semi-final progress to the grand final. On 17 November 2020, it was announced that Poland would be performing in the first half of the second semi-final of the contest.

== Clara Rubensson version ==
Parallel to the version of "The Ride" by Rafał Brzozowski, there is an alternative version of this song with a different arrangement, performed by its co-author, Swedish singer Clara Rubensson. This version appeared on 11 March 2021 that is just before the release of the Polish singer's version as a leak made by one of the music sites. In an interview published on 23 April 2021 for the eurowizja.org portal belonging to the OGAE Polska association, the songwriters revealed that the song was created in 2020 and was ready at the beginning of October with the original purpose for Clara Rubensson (which was to be the fourth single in her output), but with a view to Eurovision Song Contest the song was taken over by Rafał Brzozowski. On 16 July 2021 on the Swedish music market the song "The Ride" by Clara Rubensson was released as a bonus to her cover of the song entitled "Love in Siberia" from the repertoire of the Danish band Laban, the original version of the song was released in 1985.
