= Spain in the Eurovision Song Contest 2021 =

- Eurovision Song Contest 2021
- Participating broadcaster: Radiotelevisión Española (RTVE)
- Country: Spain
- Selection process: Artist: Internal selection Song: Destino Eurovisión 2021
- Selection date: Artist: 18 March 2020; Song: 20 February 2021

Competing entry
- Song: "Voy a quedarme"
- Artist: Blas Cantó
- Songwriters: Blas Cantó; Leroy Sanchez; Daniel Ortega "Dángelo"; Dan Hammond

Placement
- Final result: 24th, 6 points

Participation chronology

Spain was represented at the Eurovision Song Contest 2021 with the song "Voy a quedarme", written by Blas Cantó, Leroy Sanchez, Daniel Ortega "Dangelo", and Dan Hammond, and performed by Blas Cantó himself. The Spanish participating broadcaster, Radiotelevisión Española (RTVE), selected its entry through a national final, after having previously selected the performer internally. Cantó was due to compete in the 2020 contest with "Universo" before the event's cancellation. RTVE announced Cantó as its representative on 18 March 2020, while the national final Destino Eurovisión 2021 was organised in order to select the song he would perform. Two songs competed in the televised show where a public vote exclusively selected "Voy a quedarme" as the winning song, receiving 58% of the votes.

As a member of the "Big Five", Spain automatically qualified to compete in the final of the Eurovision Song Contest. Performing in position 13, Spain placed twenty-fourth out of the 26 participating countries with 6 points.

== Background ==
Prior to the 2021 contest, Televisión Española (TVE) until 2006, and Radiotelevisión Española (RTVE) since 2007, had participated in the Eurovision Song Contest representing Spain fifty-nine times since TVE's first entry in 1961. They have won the contest on two occasions: in 1968 with the song "La, la, la" performed by Massiel and in 1969 with the song "Vivo cantando" performed by Salomé, the latter having won in a four-way tie with France, the Netherlands, and the United Kingdom. They have also finished second four times, with "En un mundo nuevo" by Karina in 1971, "Eres tú" by Mocedades in 1973, "Su canción" by Betty Missiego in 1979, and "Vuelve conmigo" by Anabel Conde in 1995. In 2019, RTVE placed twenty-second with the song "La venda" performed by Miki.

As part of its duties as participating broadcaster, RTVE organises the selection of its entry in the Eurovision Song Contest and broadcasts the event in the country. RTVE confirmed its intentions to participate at the 2021 contest on 18 March 2020. In 2020, RTVE selected both the artist and song that would compete at the Eurovision Song Contest via an internal selection. For its 2021 entry, the broadcaster opted to internally select the artist that would compete at the contest, while the song would be selected via a national final.

== Before Eurovision ==
=== Internal selection ===
On 18 March 2020, RTVE confirmed that Blas Cantó would remain as the Spanish representative for the Eurovision Song Contest 2021. In regards to his re-selection as the Spanish entrant, Cantó stated: "There is a commitment on my part to continue working on our candidacy in 2021 and I am very happy to have the opportunity to do so next year." On 29 December 2020, the broadcaster revealed that a national final would select the song Blas Cantó would sing.

=== Destino Eurovisión 2021 ===
Destino Eurovisión 2021 was the national final organised by RTVE that took place on 20 February 2021 at Prado del Rey in Pozuelo de Alarcón (Community of Madrid), hosted by Tony Aguilar, Julia Varela and Víctor Escudero. Ten songs were proposed by songwriters who usually work with Blas Cantó and a committee consisting of members of RTVE and Warner Music Spain selected two songs for the national final together with Cantó and his team, which premiered on 10 February 2021 via RTVE's official website. The televised final was broadcast on La 1, TVE Internacional as well as online via RTVE's official website rtve.es, where both competing songs were performed by Blas Cantó. The winning song, "Voy a quedarme", was selected exclusively by a public vote via telephone, SMS and RTVE's official Eurovision app and website, held between 10 and 20 February 2021. The national final was watched by 969,000 viewers in Spain with a market share of 6.1%.

In addition to the performances of the competing entries, guest performers included Vanesa Martín, Nia, Andrés Suárez, Cepeda, Roi, Alba, Lydia Fairen and Lucía Estrella, former national final participant Mirela, and former Eurovision contestants Pastora Soler and Edurne which represented Spain in 2012 and 2015, respectively.

Destino Eurovisión 2021 – 20 February 2021
R/O	Song	Songwriter(s)	Televote	Place
1	"Voy a quedarme"	Blas Cantó; Leroy Sanchez; Daniel Ortega "Dángelo"; Dan Hammond	1,781,550	1
2	"Memoria"	Blas Cantó; Leroy Sanchez; Steve Daly; Oliver Som	1,290,526	2

== At Eurovision ==
According to Eurovision rules, all nations with the exceptions of the host country and the "Big Five" (France, Germany, Italy, Spain and the United Kingdom) are required to qualify from one of two semi-finals in order to compete for the final; the top ten countries from each semi-final progress to the final. As a member of the "Big 5", Spain automatically qualified to compete in the final on 22 May 2021. In addition to their participation in the final, Spain is also required to broadcast and vote in one of the two semi-finals. For the 2021 contest, the semi-final allocation draw held for 2020 which was held on 28 January 2020, was used. Spain was assigned to broadcast and vote in the second semi-final on 20 May 2021.

In Spain, TVE broadcast the semi-finals on La 2 and the final on La 1 with commentary by Tony Aguilar, Julia Varela, and Víctor Escudero; in addition, Radio Nacional de España (RNE) aired the final on Radio Nacional and Radio 5 with commentary by Imanol Durán; with all the shows also broadcast internationally on TVE Internacional and the final on Radio Exterior. RTVE appointed Nieves Álvarez as its spokesperson to announce during the final the top 12-point score awarded by the Spanish jury.

=== Final ===
Blas Cantó took part in technical rehearsals on 13 and 15 May, followed by dress rehearsals on 19, 21 and 22 May. This included the semi-final jury show on 19 May where an extended clip of the Spanish performance was filmed for broadcast during the live show on 20 May and the jury final on 21 May where the professional juries of each country watched and voted on the competing entries. After technical rehearsals were held on 15 May, the "Big 5" countries and host country Netherlands held a press conference. As part of this press conference, the artists took part in a draw to determine which half of the grand final they would subsequently participate in. Spain was drawn to compete in the first half. Following the conclusion of the second semi-final, the shows' producers decided upon the running order of the final. The running order for the semi-finals and final was decided by the shows' producers rather than through another draw, so that similar songs were not placed next to each other. Spain was subsequently placed to perform in position 13, following the entry from Iceland and before the entry from Moldova.

The Spanish performance featured Blas Cantó on stage wearing a black shirt and trousers designed by Jaime Álvarez. The stage lighting and LED screens displayed blue colours and a starry background with an eclipse appearing with a light source behind a moon. During the performance, a six-metre wide moon prop, which represented the cycle of life as explained by the head of the Spanish delegation Ana Bordas, descended from the stage ceiling above Cantó, with the LED screens transitioning to shooting stars that came behind the moon. The performance was concluded with the moon in red-lit colours and the stage displaying orange, gold and pink lighting with a gold starry galaxy on the LED screens. The stage director for the performance was Marvin Dietmann. An additional five off-stage backing vocalists were also part of the performance: Alba Gil, Héctor Artiles, Daira Monzón, Irene Alman and the co-composer of "Voy a quedarme" Dángelo Ortega. Spain placed twenty-fourth in the final, scoring 6 points: 0 points from the televoting and 6 points from the juries.

=== Voting ===
Voting during the three shows involved each country awarding two sets of points from 1-8, 10 and 12: one from their professional jury and the other from televoting. Each participating broadcaster assembles a five-member jury panel consisting of music industry professionals who are citizens of the country they represent, with a diversity in gender and age represented. The judges assess each entry based on the performances during the second Dress Rehearsal of each show, which takes place the night before each live show, against a set of criteria including: vocal capacity; the stage performance; the song's composition and originality; and the overall impression by the act. Jury members may only take part in panel once every three years, and are obliged to confirm that they are not connected to any of the participating acts in a way that would impact their ability to vote impartially. Jury members should also vote independently, with no discussion of their vote permitted with other jury members. The exact composition of the professional jury, and the results of each country's jury and televoting were released after the grand final; the individual results from each jury member were also released in an anonymised form.

Below is a breakdown of points awarded to Spain and awarded by Spain in the second semi-final and grand final of the contest, and the breakdown of the jury voting and televoting conducted during the two shows:

==== Points awarded to Spain ====
Points awarded to Spain (Final)
Score	Televote	Jury
12 points		
10 points		
8 points		
7 points		
6 points		
5 points		
4 points		Bulgaria
3 points		
2 points		United Kingdom
1 point		

==== Points awarded by Spain ====
Points awarded by Spain (Semi-final 2)
Score	Televote	Jury
12 points	Portugal	Switzerland
10 points	Bulgaria	Portugal
8 points	Iceland	Iceland
7 points	Switzerland	Greece
6 points	Finland	Austria
5 points	Denmark	Bulgaria
4 points	San Marino	Serbia
3 points	Moldova	San Marino
2 points	Serbia	Albania
1 point	Greece	Estonia

Points awarded by Spain (Final)
Score	Televote	Jury
12 points	France	France
10 points	Italy	Switzerland
8 points	Bulgaria	Malta
7 points	Switzerland	Iceland
6 points	Ukraine	Cyprus
5 points	Iceland	Portugal
4 points	Lithuania	Bulgaria
3 points	Malta	Israel
2 points	Finland	Lithuania
1 point	Portugal	Greece

==== Detailed voting results ====
The following members comprised the Spanish jury:

- Samantha Gilabert
- Antonio Hueso
- María Peláe
- Nerea Rodríguez
- David Santisteban

Detailed voting results from Spain (Semi-final 2)
R/O	Country	Jury							Televote	
R/O	Country	Juror A	Juror B	Juror C	Juror D	Juror E	Rank	Points	Rank	Points
01	San Marino	6	5	7	12	10	8	3	7	4
02	Estonia	9	10	14	10	9	10	1	14	
03	Czech Republic	8	13	10	17	11	12		15	
04	Greece	5	7	4	3	5	4	7	10	1
05	Austria	3	6	6	5	8	5	6	12	
06	Poland	13	14	16	16	16	16		16	
07	Moldova	11	12	15	9	12	13		8	3
08	Iceland	4	3	3	6	2	3	8	3	8
09	Serbia	7	9	5	11	4	7	4	9	2
10	Georgia	15	16	17	15	17	17		17	
11	Albania	12	8	13	8	6	9	2	11	
12	Portugal	2	2	2	4	3	2	10	1	12
13	Bulgaria	10	4	9	2	7	6	5	2	10
14	Finland	14	17	8	7	13	11		5	6
15	Latvia	16	11	11	14	14	14		13	
16	Switzerland	1	1	1	1	1	1	12	4	7
17	Denmark	17	15	12	13	15	15		6	5

Detailed voting results from Spain (Final)
R/O	Country	Jury							Televote	
R/O	Country	Juror A	Juror B	Juror C	Juror D	Juror E	Rank	Points	Rank	Points
01	Cyprus	7	6	10	2	6	5	6	13	
02	Albania	16	17	13	19	12	17		25	
03	Israel	3	9	9	6	10	8	3	20	
04	Belgium	18	18	15	12	22	19		22	
05	Russia	19	14	24	22	23	22		14	
06	Malta	5	3	2	8	4	3	8	8	3
07	Portugal	4	7	8	5	5	6	5	10	1
08	Serbia	14	20	17	24	9	15		18	
09	United Kingdom	10	13	19	16	25	16		23	
10	Greece	8	19	6	9	8	10	1	21	
11	Switzerland	2	2	3	1	2	2	10	4	7
12	Iceland	6	5	4	11	3	4	7	6	5
13	Spain									
14	Moldova	20	21	16	21	17	21		19	
15	Germany	15	24	14	18	18	20		15	
16	Finland	21	22	20	17	19	23		9	2
17	Bulgaria	13	8	5	4	7	7	4	3	8
18	Lithuania	11	4	12	7	14	9	2	7	4
19	Ukraine	22	23	23	25	21	25		5	6
20	France	1	1	1	3	1	1	12	1	12
21	Azerbaijan	12	11	18	15	24	14		17	
22	Norway	23	25	25	23	15	24		11	
23	Netherlands	24	10	7	13	16	11		24	
24	Italy	17	12	21	14	11	13		2	10
25	Sweden	25	16	11	10	13	12		12	
26	San Marino	9	15	22	20	20	18		16	
