= France in the Eurovision Song Contest 2021 =

- Eurovision Song Contest 2021
- Participating broadcaster: France Télévisions
- Country: France
- Selection process: Eurovision France, c'est vous qui décidez !
- Selection date: 30 January 2021

Competing entry
- Song: "Voilà"
- Artist: Barbara Pravi
- Songwriters: Barbara Pravi; Lili Poe; Igit

Placement
- Final result: 2nd, 499 points

Participation chronology

France was represented at the Eurovision Song Contest 2021 with the song "Voilà", written by Barbara Pravi, Lili Poe, and Igit, and performed by Pravi herself. The French participating broadcaster, France Télévisions, organised the national final Eurovision France, c'est vous qui décidez ! in order to select its entry for the contest. Twelve songs competed in the national final where the winner was selected over two rounds of voting. In the first round, eight entries were selected to advance to the second round: seven entries selected a public vote and one entry selected by a ten-member jury panel. In the second round, "Voilà" performed by Barbara Pravi was selected as the winner following the combination of votes from a ten-member jury panel and a public vote.

As a member of the "Big Five", France automatically qualified to compete in the final of the Eurovision Song Contest. Performing in position 20, France placed second out of the 26 participating countries with 499 points.

== Background ==
Prior to the 2021 contest, France Télévisions and its predecessor national broadcasters have participated in the Eurovision Song Contest representing France sixty-two times since RTF's debut in the inaugural contest. They first won the contest in 1958 with "Dors, mon amour" performed by André Claveau. In the 1960s, they won three times, with "Tom Pillibi" performed by Jacqueline Boyer in 1960, "Un premier amour" performed by Isabelle Aubret in 1962, and "Un jour, un enfant" performed by Frida Boccara, who won in 1969 in a four-way tie with the Netherlands, Spain, and the United Kingdom. Their fifth – and so far latest – victory came in 1977 with "L'oiseau et l'enfant" performed by Marie Myriam. France has also finished second four times, with Paule Desjardins in 1957, Catherine Ferry in 1976, Joëlle Ursull in 1990, and Amina in 1991 (who lost out to Sweden's Carola in a tie-break). In the 21st century, France has had less success, only making the top ten four times, with Natasha St-Pier finishing fourth in 2001, Sandrine François finishing fifth in 2002, Patricia Kaas finishing eighth in 2009, Amir finishing sixth in 2016. In 2020, they were set to be represented by the song "Mon alliée (The Best in Me)" performed by Tom Leeb before the event's cancellation due to the COVID-19 pandemic.

As part of its duties as participating broadcaster, France Télévisions organises the selection of its entry in the Eurovision Song Contest and broadcasts the event in the country through France 2. The broadcaster confirmed that it would participate in the 2021 contest on 22 June 2020. The French broadcasters had used both national finals and internal selection to choose its entry in the past. In 2018 and 2019, the broadcaster selected its entries via the national final Destination Eurovision. In 2020, France Télévisions opted to internally select its entry, however it announced in June 2020 that the 2021 entry would be selected via a new national final format.

== Before Eurovision ==
=== Eurovision France, c'est vous qui décidez ! ===
Eurovision France, c'est vous qui décidez ! ("Eurovision France, it's you who decide!") was the national final staged by France 2 to select the French entry for the Eurovision Song Contest 2021. The competition took place on 30 January 2021 at the France Télévisions studio in Paris, hosted by Stéphane Bern and Laurence Boccolini. The show was broadcast on France 2, TV5Monde and TV5 Québec Canada on a time delay as well as online via the broadcaster's official website france.tv. The national final was watched by 2.37 million viewers in France with a market share of 12.3%.

==== Format ====
The format of the national final consisted of a live final on 30 January 2021 where the winner was selected over two rounds of voting. Twelve entries competed in the first round, from which seven were selected exclusively by public televoting to advance to the second round, the superfinal. A ten-member Francophone and international jury panel then selected a wildcard entry from the remaining five entries to proceed to the superfinal. In the superfinal, the winner was determined by the combination of public televoting (50%) and the ten-member jury panel (50%). The public and the juries each had a total of 420 points to award, with each jury member awarding 2, 4, 6, 8, 10 and 12 points to their top six entries. Viewers were able to vote via telephone and SMS voting which also accepted international votes, with the public vote awarding 10, 20, 30, 50, 60, 70, 80 and 100 points to their top eight songs.

The jury panel consisted of:

- Amir (jury president) – singer, songwriter, represented France in 2016
- Chimène Badi – Singer
- Michèle Bernier – Comedian
- Agustín Galiana – Spanish singer and comedian
- Jean-Paul Gaultier – Fashion designer
- Élodie Gossuin – Television presenter
- Duncan Laurence – Dutch singer, won Eurovision for the Netherlands in 2019
- André Manoukian – Jazz singer and former judge on Nouvelle Star
- Marie Myriam – Singer, won Eurovision for France in 1977
- Natasha St-Pier – Canadian singer, represented France in 2001

==== Competing entries ====
France 2 opened a submission period on 29 June 2020 in order for interested artists and songwriters to submit their proposals through an online submission form up until the deadline on 30 September 2020. Songs were required to contain a majority of French language or French regional language lyrics with a free language allowance for the remaining lyrics. At the closing of the deadline, the French broadcaster received 700 submissions. Auditions which featured 20 entries shortlisted from the received submissions took place at the Apollo Theatre in Paris and the twelve entries selected to compete in the national final were announced on 9 December 2020. Between 16 and 27 December 2020, the competing artists and their entries were presented to the public through television specials titled Eurovision France, les finalistes.

==== Final ====
The final took place on 30 January 2021. Twelve entries competed and the winner was selected over two rounds of voting. In the first round, the top seven entries as determined exclusively by public televoting advanced to the second round, the superfinal. "Magique" performed by LMK was awarded the wildcard by a Francophone and international ten-member jury panel from the remaining five entries to proceed to the superfinal. Immediately after the artists concluded their performances, a number was shown which denoted the amount of jury members who liked the song, however the results were symbolic and did not affect the voting. In the superfinal, the winner, "Voilà" performed by Barbara Pravi, was determined by the combination of public televoting and the ten-member jury.

In addition to performing their contest entry, the eight superfinalists performed the Eurovision winning song for Switzerland in 1988, "Ne partez pas sans moi", originally performed by Celine Dion, together Valentina, who won Junior Eurovision 2020 for France, who also performed her winning song "J'imagine". Jury member Amir performed a medley of his songs from his three French language albums as the interval act of the show.

Final – 30 January 2021
R/O	Artist	Song	Songwriter(s)	Likes	Result
1	Andriamad	"Alléluia"	Andriamad	8	—N/a
2	Juliette Moraine	"Pourvu qu'on m'aime"	Juliette Moraine, Rémi Portat	7	Advanced
3	Céphaz	"On a mangé le soleil"	Antoine Essertier, Elise Rieslinger	6	Advanced
4	Amui	"Maeva"	Ken Carlter, Serena F. Carlter, Edwiga Taerea	5	Advanced
5	Philippine	"Bah non"	Philippine Zadéo, Caméléon	5	—N/a
6	Terence James	"Je t'emmènerai danser"	Terence James, Ben Mazué	6	—N/a
7	Barbara Pravi	"Voilà"	Barbara Pravi, Lili Poe, Igit	9	Advanced
8	Pony X	"Amour fou"	Spoolman, SquirL, Clarence	7	Advanced
9	Casanova	"Tutti"	Yoann Casanova, Théo Grasset, Jérôme Brulant	7	Advanced
10	LMK	"Magique"	Eve-Line Lamarca, High P	6	Wildcard
11	Ali	"Paris me dit (Yalla ya helo!)"	Hyphen Hyphen	6	—N/a
12	21 juin, le Duo	"Peux-tu me dire ?"	Julien Guillemin, Manon Pècheur, Jan Orsi	6	Advanced

Superfinal – 30 January 2021
R/O	Artist	Song	Jury	Televote	Total	Place
1	Juliette Moraine	"Pourvu qu'on m'aime"	76	60	136	2
2	Céphaz	"On a mangé le soleil"	52	30	82	5
3	Amui	"Maeva"	8	70	78	6
4	Barbara Pravi	"Voilà"	104	100	204	1
5	Pony X	"Amour fou"	74	50	124	3
6	Casanova	"Tutti"	22	80	102	4
7	LMK	"Magique"	66	10	76	7
8	21 juin, le Duo	"Peux-tu me dire ?"	18	20	38	8

Detailed Jury Votes
R/O	Song	M. Myriam	J. P. Gaultier	É. Gossuin	D. Laurence	C. Badi	M. Bernier	A. Manoukian	N. St-Pier	A. Galiana	Amir	Total
1	"Pourvu qu'on m'aime"	6	6	8	8	8	12	6	10	6	6	76
2	"On a mangé le soleil"	8	8	6	4	2		8	6	2	8	52
3	"Maeva"						2	4	2			8
4	"Voilà"	2	10	12	10	12	10	12	12	12	12	104
5	"Amour fou"	12	12	10	2	10	4	2	8	4	10	74
6	"Tutti"	4		2	6					8	2	22
7	"Magique"	10	2		12	6	8	10	4	10	4	66
8	"Peux-tu me dire?"		4	4		4	6					18

== At Eurovision ==
According to Eurovision rules, all nations with the exceptions of the host country and the "Big Five" (France, Germany, Italy, Spain and the United Kingdom) are required to qualify from one of two semi-finals in order to compete for the final; the top ten countries from each semi-final progress to the final. As a member of the "Big 5", France automatically qualified to compete in the final on 22 May 2021. In addition to their participation in the final, France was also required to broadcast and vote in one of the two semi-finals. In accordance with the allocation draw conducted on 28 January 2020 and carried over to 2021, France was assigned to broadcast and vote in the second semi-final on 20 May 2021.

In France, the semi-finals were broadcast on Culturebox with commentary by Laurence Boccolini, while the final was broadcast on France 2 with commentary by Stéphane Bern and Laurence Boccolini. France Télévisions appointed Carla Lazzari, who represented France in Junior Eurovision 2019, as its spokesperson to announce the top 12-point score awarded by the French jury during the final.

=== Final ===
Following the conclusion of the second semi-final, the shows' producers decided upon the running order of the final. The running order for the semi-finals and final was decided by the shows' producers rather than through another draw, so that similar songs were not placed next to each other. France was drawn in position 20, following the song from Ukraine and preceding the song from Azerbaijan.

For the live performance, Barbara Pravi performed alone dressed in a two-piece outfit in black and using the same staging and visuals from her national final performance.

France placed second in the final, scoring 499 points: 251 points from the televoting and 248 points from the juries. This was France's best result since 1991.

=== Voting ===
Voting during the three shows involved each country awarding two sets of points from 1-8, 10 and 12: one from their professional jury and the other from televoting. Each nation's jury consisted of five music industry professionals who are citizens of the country they represent, with a diversity in gender and age represented. The judges assess each entry based on the performances during the second Dress Rehearsal of each show, which takes place the night before each live show, against a set of criteria including: vocal capacity; the stage performance; the song's composition and originality; and the overall impression by the act. Jury members may only take part in panel once every three years, and are obliged to confirm that they are not connected to any of the participating acts in a way that would impact their ability to vote impartially. Jury members should also vote independently, with no discussion of their vote permitted with other jury members. The exact composition of the professional jury, and the results of each country's jury and televoting were released after the grand final; the individual results from each jury member were also released in an anonymised form.

==== Points awarded to France ====
Points awarded to France (Final)
Score	Televote	Jury
12 points	Belgium; Netherlands; Portugal; Spain	Germany; Ireland; Netherlands; San Marino; Serbia; Spain; Switzerland; United Kingdom
10 points	Bulgaria; Germany; San Marino; Serbia	Albania; Czech Republic; Estonia; Ukraine
8 points	Cyprus; Greece; Israel; Lithuania; Romania	Austria; Israel
7 points	Croatia; Estonia; Iceland; Ireland	Australia; Bulgaria; Cyprus; Finland; North Macedonia
6 points	Albania; Austria; Finland; Moldova; Russia; Slovenia; Sweden; Switzerland	Croatia; Iceland; Portugal; Sweden
5 points	Georgia; North Macedonia; Poland; Ukraine; United Kingdom	Greece; Lithuania
4 points	Australia; Norway	Azerbaijan; Moldova; Norway; Romania
3 points	Denmark; Latvia; Malta	Italy; Latvia; Malta
2 points	Azerbaijan; Czech Republic	Slovenia
1 point	Italy	

==== Points awarded by France ====
Points awarded by France (Semi-final 2)
Score	Televote	Jury
12 points	Moldova	Greece
10 points	Portugal	Portugal
8 points	Switzerland	San Marino
7 points	Serbia	Finland
6 points	Iceland	Iceland
5 points	Bulgaria	Serbia
4 points	Denmark	Bulgaria
3 points	Albania	Switzerland
2 points	Finland	Czech Republic
1 point	Poland	Moldova

Points awarded by France (Final)
Score	Televote	Jury
12 points	Ukraine	Greece
10 points	Italy	Russia
8 points	Portugal	Portugal
7 points	Moldova	Switzerland
6 points	Switzerland	Belgium
5 points	Israel	Israel
4 points	Iceland	San Marino
3 points	Serbia	Iceland
2 points	Sweden	Cyprus
1 point	Finland	Sweden

==== Detailed voting results ====
The following members comprised the French jury:

- Géraldine Allouche
- Adrien Kaiser
- Kahina Kimoune
- Gilbert Marcellus
- Loïc Parent

Detailed voting results from France (Semi-final 2)
R/O	Country	Jury							Televote	
R/O	Country	Juror A	Juror B	Juror C	Juror D	Juror E	Rank	Points	Rank	Points
01	San Marino	5	6	3	3	2	3	8	12	
02	Estonia	6	11	10	12	17	12		13	
03	Czech Republic	4	8	13	15	9	9	2	16	
04	Greece	3	1	2	4	1	1	12	11	
05	Austria	9	13	7	11	11	11		17	
06	Poland	11	16	14	14	16	17		10	1
07	Moldova	8	7	11	13	7	10	1	1	12
08	Iceland	7	14	4	6	3	5	6	5	6
09	Serbia	14	4	6	5	5	6	5	4	7
10	Georgia	10	9	9	10	15	13		14	
11	Albania	15	12	8	9	14	14		8	3
12	Portugal	1	3	5	2	6	2	10	2	10
13	Bulgaria	16	5	15	1	12	7	4	6	5
14	Finland	12	2	1	8	4	4	7	9	2
15	Latvia	17	10	16	17	13	16		15	
16	Switzerland	2	15	12	7	10	8	3	3	8
17	Denmark	13	17	17	16	8	15		7	4

Detailed voting results from France (Final)
R/O	Country	Jury							Televote	
R/O	Country	Juror A	Juror B	Juror C	Juror D	Juror E	Rank	Points	Rank	Points
01	Cyprus	8	15	12	12	3	9	2	22	
02	Albania	16	4	16	22	11	15		15	
03	Israel	4	5	10	7	15	6	5	6	5
04	Belgium	17	2	11	3	13	5	6	21	
05	Russia	5	3	5	1	18	2	10	12	
06	Malta	9	11	25	13	9	18		16	
07	Portugal	1	6	8	4	21	3	8	3	8
08	Serbia	25	25	17	16	10	22		8	3
09	United Kingdom	12	24	21	23	14	24		25	
10	Greece	2	23	4	5	1	1	12	20	
11	Switzerland	3	1	15	10	20	4	7	5	6
12	Iceland	20	7	7	9	4	8	3	7	4
13	Spain	11	14	20	15	23	21		19	
14	Moldova	6	22	14	21	8	17		4	7
15	Germany	18	9	13	24	5	16		13	
16	Finland	19	16	1	20	19	12		10	1
17	Bulgaria	14	12	18	2	25	13		17	
18	Lithuania	21	21	6	19	6	14		11	
19	Ukraine	22	8	24	25	7	19		1	12
20	France									
21	Azerbaijan	24	13	22	17	16	25		18	
22	Norway	15	20	23	18	12	23		14	
23	Netherlands	7	19	19	14	24	20		23	
24	Italy	23	10	3	8	22	11		2	10
25	Sweden	10	18	2	11	17	10	1	9	2
26	San Marino	13	17	9	6	2	7	4	24	
