= Rafał Brzozowski =

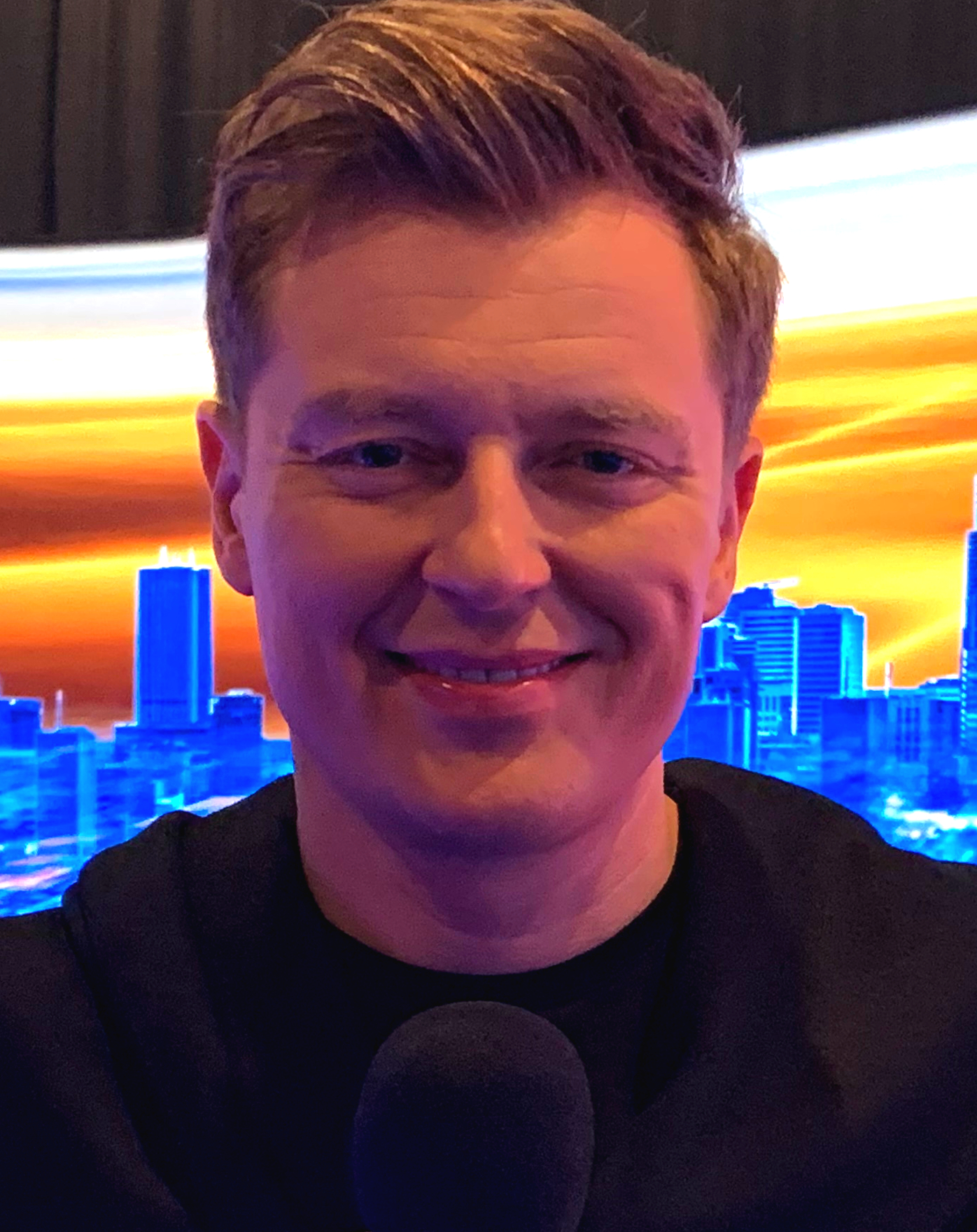
- Rafał Brzozowski in 2021

Background information
- Born: 8 June 1981 (age 45); Warsaw, Poland
- Years active: 2012–present
- Label: Universal Music Polska

Rafał Brzozowski (pronounced [ˈrafaw bʐɔˈzofski]; born 8 June 1981) is a Polish singer and television presenter. His career started through participation in the first season of The Voice of Poland in 2011. He hosted the Polish version of Wheel of Fortune.

Brzozowski attempted to represent Poland in the Eurovision Song Contest 2017 with the song "Sky Over Europe", finishing second in the national final Krajowe Eliminacje.

He co-hosted the 2020 Junior Eurovision Song Contest.

He represented Poland in the Eurovision Song Contest 2021 in Rotterdam with the song "The Ride", but failed to qualify to the final, finishing 14th in second semi-final with 35 points.

== Discography ==
=== Studio albums ===
| Title | Details |
|---|---|
| Tak blisko | Released: August 7, 2012; Format: Digital download, CD; Label: Universal Music Polska |
| Mój czas | Released: September 30, 2014; Format: Digital download, CD; Label: Universal Music Polska |
| Na święta | Released: November 25, 2014; Format: Digital download, CD; Label: Universal Music Polska |
| Borysewicz & Brzozowski (with Jan Borysewicz) | Released: November 27, 2015; Format: Digital download, CD; Label: Universal Music Polska |
| Moje serce to jest muzyk, czyli polskie standardy | Released: November 25, 2016; Format: Digital download, CD; Label: Universal Music Polska |
| Zielone I Love You | Released: October 28, 2022; Format: Digital download, CD; Label: Grash Music |

=== Extended plays ===
| Title | Details |
|---|---|
| Tak blisko Remixed | Released: 11 September 2012; Format: Digital download, CD; Label: Universal Music Polska |
| Katrina Remixes feat. Liber | Released: 29 November 2012; Format: Digital download, CD; Label: Universal Music Polska |

=== Singles ===
| Title | Year | Album |
|---|---|---|
| "Tak blisko" | 2012 | Tak blisko |
| "Katrina" (featuring Liber) | 2012 | Tak blisko |
| "Gdy śliczna Panna" | 2012 | Na święta |
| "Za mały świat" | 2013 | Tak blisko |
| "Nie mam nic" | 2013 | Tak blisko |
| "Za chwilę przyjdą święta" | 2013 | Na święta |
| "Magiczne słowa" | 2014 | Mój czas |
| "Świat jest nasz" | 2014 | Mój czas |
| "Linia czasu" | 2014 | Mój czas |
| "Kto" | 2015 | Mój czas |
| "Jeden tydzień" | 2015 | Mój czas |
| "Słowa na otarcie łez" (with Jan Borysewicz) | 2015 | Borysewicz & Brzozowski |
| "Zaczekaj – tyle kłamstw co prawd" | 2016 | Non-album singles |
| "Sky Over Europe" | 2017 | Non-album singles |
| "Już wiem" | 2017 | Non-album singles |
| "Gentleman" | 2020 | Non-album singles |
| "The Ride" | 2021 | Non-album singles |
| "Głośniej" | 2021 | Non-album singles |
| "W kinie" | 2022 | Zielone I Love You |
| "W zimnych dłoniach chęć" | 2022 | Zielone I Love You |

Awards and achievements
| Preceded by (Poland) Ida Nowakowska, Aleksander Sikora and Roksana Węgiel | Junior Eurovision Song Contest presenter 2020; With: Ida Nowakowska and Małgorzata Tomaszewska | Succeeded by (France) Élodie Gossuin, Olivier Minne and Carla Lazzari |
| Preceded by Alicja with "Empires" | Poland in the Eurovision Song Contest; 2021 | Succeeded by Ochman with "River" |
