= Norway in the Eurovision Song Contest 2021 =

- Eurovision Song Contest 2021
- Participating broadcaster: Norsk rikskringkasting (NRK)
- Country: Norway
- Selection process: Melodi Grand Prix 2021
- Selection date: 20 February 2021

Competing entry
- Song: "Fallen Angel"
- Artist: Tix
- Songwriters: Andreas Haukeland; Emelie Hollow; Mathias Haukeland

Placement
- Semi-final result: Qualified (10th, 115 points)
- Final result: 18th, 75 points

Participation chronology

Norway was represented at the Eurovision Song Contest 2021 with the song "Fallen Angel", written by Andreas Haukeland, Emelie Hollow, and Mathias Haukeland, and performed by Andreas Haukeland himself under his stage name Tix. The Norwegian participating broadcaster, Norsk rikskringkasting (NRK), used the national selection Melodi Grand Prix 2021 to decide its entry in the contest.

== Background ==
Prior to the 2021 contest, Norway had participated in the Eurovision Song Contest fifty-nine times since their first entry in 1960. Norway had won the contest on three occasions: in 1985 with the song "La det swinge" performed by Bobbysocks!, in 1995 with the song "Nocturne" performed by Secret Garden and in 2009 with the song "Fairytale" performed by Alexander Rybak. Norway also had the two dubious distinctions of having finished last in the Eurovision final more than any other country and for having the most "nul points" (zero points) in the contest, the latter being a record the nation shared together with Austria. The country had finished last eleven times and had failed to score a point during four contests. Following the introduction of semi-finals in 2004, Norway has only failed to qualify on three occasions. In 2019, Norway was represented by Keiino with the song "Spirit in the Sky", which placed 6th in the final with 331 points. In 2020, Ulrikke Brandstorp was set to represent Norway with the song "Attention" before the contest's cancellation.

The Norwegian national broadcaster, Norsk rikskringkasting (NRK), broadcasts the event within Norway and organises the selection process for the nation's entry. The broadcaster has traditionally organised the national final Melodi Grand Prix, which has selected the Norwegian entry for the Eurovision Song Contest in all but one of their participations.

== Before Eurovision ==
=== Melodi Grand Prix 2021 ===
Melodi Grand Prix 2021 was the 59th edition of the Norwegian national final Melodi Grand Prix which selected Norway's entry for the 2021 contest. The competition consisted of five semi-finals between 16 January and 13 February, a Last Chance round on 15 February and a final on 20 February 2021. The five semi-final shows were hosted by Kåre Magnus Bergh, Ingrid Gjessing Linhave and Ronny Brede Aase, while the Last Chance round and the final were hosted by Kåre Magnus Bergh, Ingrid Gjessing Linhave and Silje Nordnes. The national final was televised on NRK1, NRK TV, broadcast via radio on NRK P1 as well as streamed online at NRK's official website nrk.no.

==== Semi-finals and Last Chance round ====
- The first semi-final took place on 16 January 2021. "Let Loose" performed by Blåsemafian feat. Hazel qualified to the final.
- The second semi-final took place on 23 January 2021. "Hero" performed by Raylee qualified to the final.
- The third semi-final took place on 30 January 2021. "Witch Woods" performed by Emmy qualified to the final.
- The fourth semi-final took place on 6 February 2021. "My Lonely Voice" performed by Kiim qualified to the final.
- The fifth semi-final took place on 13 February 2021. "I Can't Escape" performed by Imerika qualified to the final.
- The Last Chance round (Siste sjansen) took place on 15 February 2021. "Faith Bloody Faith" performed by Jorn qualified to the final.

==== Final ====
Twelve songs consisting of the six semi-final and Last Chance qualifiers alongside the six pre-qualified songs competed during the final on 20 February 2021 at the H3 Arena in Fornebu. The winner was selected over three rounds of online voting. In the first round, the top four entries were selected to proceed to the second round, the Gold Final. In the Gold Final, the top two entries were selected to proceed to the third round, the Gold Duel. In the Gold Duel, the results of the online vote were revealed by Norway's five regions and led to the victory of "Fallen Angel" performed by Tix with 380,033 votes.

Final – 20 February 2021
R/O	Artist	Song	Result
1	Atle Pettersen	"World on Fire"	—N/a
2	Raylee	"Hero"	—N/a
3	Stavangerkameratene	"Who I Am"	—N/a
4	Kiim	"My Lonely Voice"	—N/a
5	Blåsemafian feat. Hazel	"Let Loose"	Gold Final
6	Emmy	"Witch Woods"	—N/a
7	Tix	"Fallen Angel"	Gold Final
8	Kaja Rode	"Feel Again"	—N/a
9	Rein Alexander	"Eyes Wide Open"	—N/a
10	Imerika	"I Can't Escape"	—N/a
11	Keiino	"Monument"	Gold Final
12	Jorn	"Faith Bloody Faith"	Gold Final

Gold Final
R/O	Artist	Song	Result
1	Blåsemafian feat. Hazel	"Let Loose"	—N/a
2	Tix	"Fallen Angel"	Gold Duel
3	Keiino	"Monument"	Gold Duel
4	Jorn	"Faith Bloody Faith"	—N/a

Gold Duel
R/O	Artist	Song	Votes	Place
1	Keiino	"Monument"	281,043	2
2	Tix	"Fallen Angel"	380,033	1

=== Preparations ===
Tix recorded a backup tape of his performance on 22 February 2021, which would have been broadcast at Eurovision in the event that he was unable to travel to Rotterdam for the contest.

== At Eurovision ==
According to Eurovision rules, all nations with the exceptions of the host country and the "Big Five" (France, Germany, Italy, Spain and the United Kingdom) are required to qualify from one of two semi-finals in order to compete in the final; the top ten countries from each semi-final progress to the final. The European Broadcasting Union (EBU) split up the competing countries into six different pots based on voting patterns from previous contests, with countries with favourable voting histories put into the same pot. For the 2021 contest, the semi-final allocation draw held for 2020 which was held on 28 January 2020, will be used. Norway was placed into the first semi-final, which was held on 18 May 2021, and was scheduled to perform in the second half of the show.

=== Semi-final ===
Once all the competing songs for the 2021 contest had been released, the running order for the semi-finals was decided by the shows' producers rather than through another draw, so that similar songs were not placed next to each other. Norway was set to perform in position 9, following the entry from Cyprus and preceding the entry from Croatia.

On 18 May, the day the semi-final was held, Norway qualified for the Grand Final, to be held on 22 May.

=== Final ===
Norway performed 22nd in the grand final on 22 May 2021, following Azerbaijan and preceding the Netherlands.

=== Voting ===
Voting during the three shows involved each country awarding two sets of points from 1–8, 10 and 12: one from their professional jury and the other from televoting. Each nation's jury consisted of five music industry professionals who are citizens of the country they represent, with a diversity in gender and age represented. The judges assess each entry based on the performances during the second Dress Rehearsal of each show, which takes place the night before each live show, against a set of criteria including: vocal capacity; the stage performance; the song's composition and originality; and the overall impression by the act. Jury members may only take part in panel once every three years, and are obliged to confirm that they are not connected to any of the participating acts in a way that would impact their ability to vote impartially. Jury members should also vote independently, with no discussion of their vote permitted with other jury members. The exact composition of the professional jury, and the results of each country's jury and televoting were released after the grand final; the individual results from each jury member were also released in an anonymised form.

==== Points awarded to Norway ====
Points awarded to Norway (Semi-final 1)
Score	Televote	Jury
12 points	Sweden	
10 points	Azerbaijan	
8 points		Sweden
7 points		Belgium
6 points	Belgium; Lithuania; Malta; Russia; Slovenia	Italy
5 points		
4 points	Germany; Israel	Netherlands
3 points	Australia; Netherlands; Romania	Ireland; Slovenia
2 points	Croatia; Ireland; Ukraine	Israel; Lithuania; North Macedonia
1 point	Cyprus; Italy	Australia

Points awarded to Norway (Final)
Score	Televote	Jury
12 points		
10 points	Malta	
8 points	Denmark; Sweden	
7 points	Azerbaijan	Ireland
6 points		
5 points	Lithuania	
4 points	Estonia; Finland	
3 points	Poland	Denmark
2 points	Latvia; Slovenia; United Kingdom	Italy; Sweden
1 point	Australia; Austria; Belgium; Germany; Iceland	Ukraine

==== Points awarded by Norway ====
Points awarded by Norway (Semi-final 1)
Score	Televote	Jury
12 points	Lithuania	Malta
10 points	Sweden	Sweden
8 points	Malta	Israel
7 points	Ukraine	Ukraine
6 points	Azerbaijan	Azerbaijan
5 points	Israel	Cyprus
4 points	Russia	Slovenia
3 points	Cyprus	Russia
2 points	Belgium	Romania
1 point	Croatia	Ireland

Points awarded by Norway (Final)
Score	Televote	Jury
12 points	Lithuania	Malta
10 points	Iceland	Sweden
8 points	Sweden	Israel
7 points	Italy	Switzerland
6 points	Finland	Bulgaria
5 points	Ukraine	Italy
4 points	France	France
3 points	Malta	Ukraine
2 points	Switzerland	Iceland
1 point	Azerbaijan	Greece

==== Detailed voting results ====
The following members comprised the Norwegian jury:

- Kate Gulbrandsen
- Anna-Lisa Kumoji
- Rolf Lennart Stensø
- Vilde
- Aleksander Walmann

Detailed voting results from Norway (Semi-final 1)
R/O	Country	Jury							Televote	
R/O	Country	Juror A	Juror B	Juror C	Juror D	Juror E	Rank	Points	Rank	Points
01	Lithuania	15	8	9	14	11	13		1	12
02	Slovenia	7	6	6	7	13	7	4	14	
03	Russia	4	11	4	13	12	8	3	7	4
04	Sweden	2	1	7	1	2	2	10	2	10
05	Australia	14	9	13	12	9	14		15	
06	North Macedonia	13	10	10	15	14	15		12	
07	Ireland	12	5	14	9	5	10	1	13	
08	Cyprus	8	3	8	6	6	6	5	8	3
09	Norway									
10	Croatia	11	15	12	11	7	12		10	1
11	Belgium	9	12	11	8	15	11		9	2
12	Israel	3	7	3	3	8	3	8	6	5
13	Romania	10	13	15	4	4	9	2	11	
14	Azerbaijan	5	4	5	5	10	5	6	5	6
15	Ukraine	6	14	2	10	3	4	7	4	7
16	Malta	1	2	1	2	1	1	12	3	8

Detailed voting results from Norway (Final)
R/O	Country	Jury							Televote	
R/O	Country	Juror A	Juror B	Juror C	Juror D	Juror E	Rank	Points	Rank	Points
01	Cyprus	12	8	23	9	17	15		13	
02	Albania	13	18	11	22	20	19		21	
03	Israel	2	5	3	3	13	3	8	18	
04	Belgium	21	19	18	18	22	22		22	
05	Russia	9	12	8	23	18	16		11	
06	Malta	1	2	1	4	2	1	12	8	3
07	Portugal	14	15	14	10	11	17		12	
08	Serbia	19	25	22	20	24	24		15	
09	United Kingdom	20	9	7	13	12	14		24	
10	Greece	10	7	13	5	23	10	1	19	
11	Switzerland	18	3	5	2	5	4	7	9	2
12	Iceland	4	13	15	14	7	9	2	2	10
13	Spain	22	23	20	19	14	21		23	
14	Moldova	17	24	25	25	19	23		25	
15	Germany	24	22	24	24	25	25		14	
16	Finland	16	16	4	15	9	13		5	6
17	Bulgaria	23	4	19	7	1	5	6	16	
18	Lithuania	25	14	10	16	15	18		1	12
19	Ukraine	5	21	2	21	10	8	3	6	5
20	France	6	6	9	8	8	7	4	7	4
21	Azerbaijan	8	11	6	11	16	11		10	1
22	Norway									
23	Netherlands	11	10	16	17	4	12		20	
24	Italy	7	20	12	6	3	6	5	4	7
25	Sweden	3	1	17	1	6	2	10	3	8
26	San Marino	15	17	21	12	21	20		17	
