= Monument (Keiino song) =

Single by KEiiNO

from the album OKTA guokte
- Released: 14 January 2021
- Recorded: 2020
- Genre: Pop; Drum'n'bass; Joik; Eurodance; Hip hop
- Length: 3:05
- Label: Caroline International
- Songwriters: Alexander Nyborg Olsson; Alexandra Rotan; Fred Buljo; Rüdiger Schramm; Tom Hugo
- Producers: Rüdiger Schramm; Tom Hugo

KEiiNO singles chronology
"A Winter's Night" (2020)	"Monument" (2021)	"Unbreakable" (2021)

Music video
- "MONUMENT" on YouTube

"Monument" is a song by the Norwegian supergroup Keiino. It was released as a digital download and for streaming on 14 January 2021 by Caroline International. The song placed second in Melodi Grand Prix 2021, the Norwegian pre-selection for the Eurovision Song Contest 2021. The song was written by Alexander Nyborg Olsson, Alexandra Rotan, Fred Buljo, Rüdiger Schramm and Tom Hugo.

== Background ==
This is the second time the group are taking part in Melodi Grand Prix after winning in 2019, the group represented Norway in the Eurovision Song Contest 2019 with the song "Spirit in the Sky". They qualified to the final and received the highest points from the televote with a total of 291 points, although combined with their score from the jury they finished in 6th place, with 331 points. Talking about returning to compete on Melodi Grand Prix, Alexandra Rotan said, "We can’t wait to be back! We absolutely love the MGP and Eurovision world, and it feels like home. Being in KEiiNO has really been life changing for me." Talking about the song, Tom Hugo said, "We really believe 'Monument' has that little something extra that will appeal to both the public and the juries. It is time to bring the Eurovision Song Contest back to beautiful Norway, and we really hope the Norwegian people will vote us through and give us that chance."

== Music video ==
The release of the music video for "Monument" was published on Keiino's YouTube channel on 4 February 2021. It was filmed at different locations in Norway during October and November 2020 by Tobias Aasgaarden with production executed by Tom Hugo and Keiino, editing by Alex Holm and grading by Håvard Småvik. Additional video footage was taken by Natural Light Earth. Recording took place at several places in Norway: Lindesnes, Lysebotn, Haukeli, Vøringsfossen, Skåla, Slogen, Hoddevik, Vestkapp, Lofoten, Kautokeino, and Alta.

== Melodi Grand Prix ==
On 11 January 2021, it was announced that the group would participate in the Melodi Grand Prix 2021 final with the pre-qualified song. They performed the song during the first heat on 16 January 2021. The song reached the final four, and entered the gold duel at the finale on 20 February 2021, placing second in the duel to TIX.

== Personnel ==
Credits adapted from Tidal.

- Rüdiger Schramm – producer, composer, lyricist, associated performer, programming
- Tom Hugo – producer, composer, lyricist, associated performer, executive producer, vocals
- Alexander Nyborg Olsson – composer, lyricist
- Alexandra Rotan – composer, lyricist, associated performer, vocals
- Fred Buljo – composer, lyricist, associated performer, vocals
- Andrea Christiane Berglihn – associated performer, violin
- Armando Toledo Aribu – associated performer, violin
- Håvard Kværne Hansen – associated performer, drums
- Kjell Åge Stoveland – associated performer, viola
- Leonardo Sesenna – associated performer, cello
- Markus Bastoe – associated performer, guitar
- Thomas Berlin – associated performer, programming
- Georg Tanderø – mastering engineer, studio personnel
- Christer André Cederberg – mixer, studio personnel
- Jaran Gustavson – recording engineer, studio personnel

== Charts ==
Chart (2021)	Peak position
Norway (VG-lista)	7

== Certifications ==
Region	Certification	Certified units/sales
Norway (IFPI Norway)	Platinum	60,000^{‡}
^{‡} Sales+streaming figures based on certification alone.
