= Fred Buljo =

Fred-René Buljo
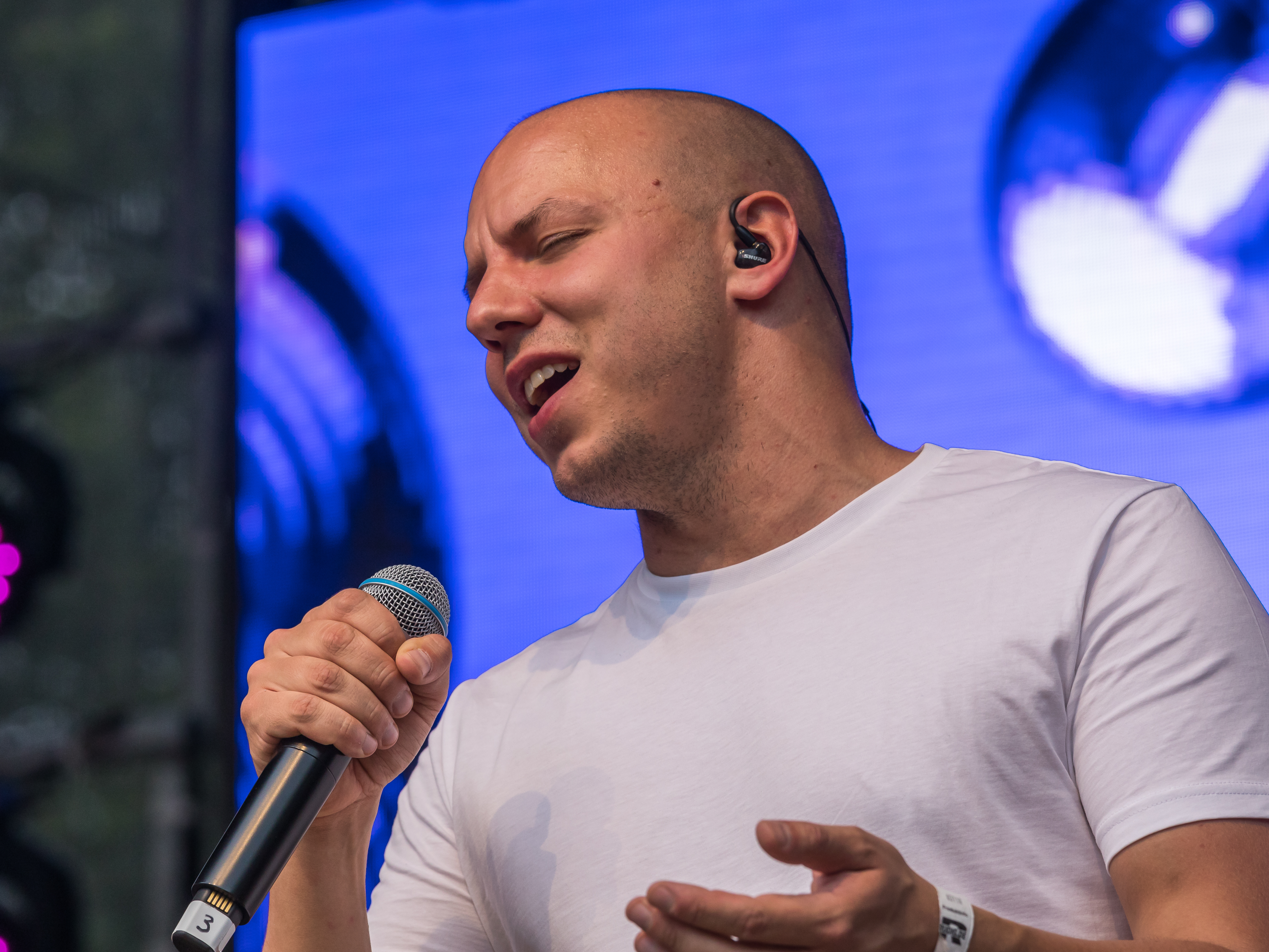
- Buljo at Cologne Pride in 2019
- Born: Fred-René Øvergård Buljo; 6 February 1988 (age 38); Kautokeino, Norway
- Other name: Fred Buljo
- Occupations: Musician; politician; producer; songwriter; rapper; joiker
- Years active: 2007–present

Member of the Sami Parliament of Norway
- In office 2016–2017

Deputy of the Sami Parliament of Norway
- In office 2013–2016

Personal details
- Party: Árja
- Musical career
- Genres: Hip hop; Sámi; joik
- Website: duottar.com keiino.com

Fred-René Øvergård Buljo (born 6 February 1988), better known as simply Fred Buljo, is a Norwegian Sámi rapper and joiker. Buljo is a member of the Sámi rap duo Duolva Duottar, consisting of Buljo and Ole Mahtte Gaup, established in 2007. In 2008, the group made a breakthrough when they participated in Norske Talenter and reached the final. He also is one of members of the supergroup KEiiNO, alongside Alexandra Rotan and Tom Hugo. The group was created in late 2018 in preparation for the participation in Melodi Grand Prix 2019, which they won and so were selected to represent Norway in the Eurovision Song Contest 2019, finishing in sixth place.

As well as being a musician, Buljo also has served in the Sami Parliament for the party Árja, first as a deputy from 2013 to 2016, and as an MP and parliamentary leader in the period 2016–2017.

== Musical career ==
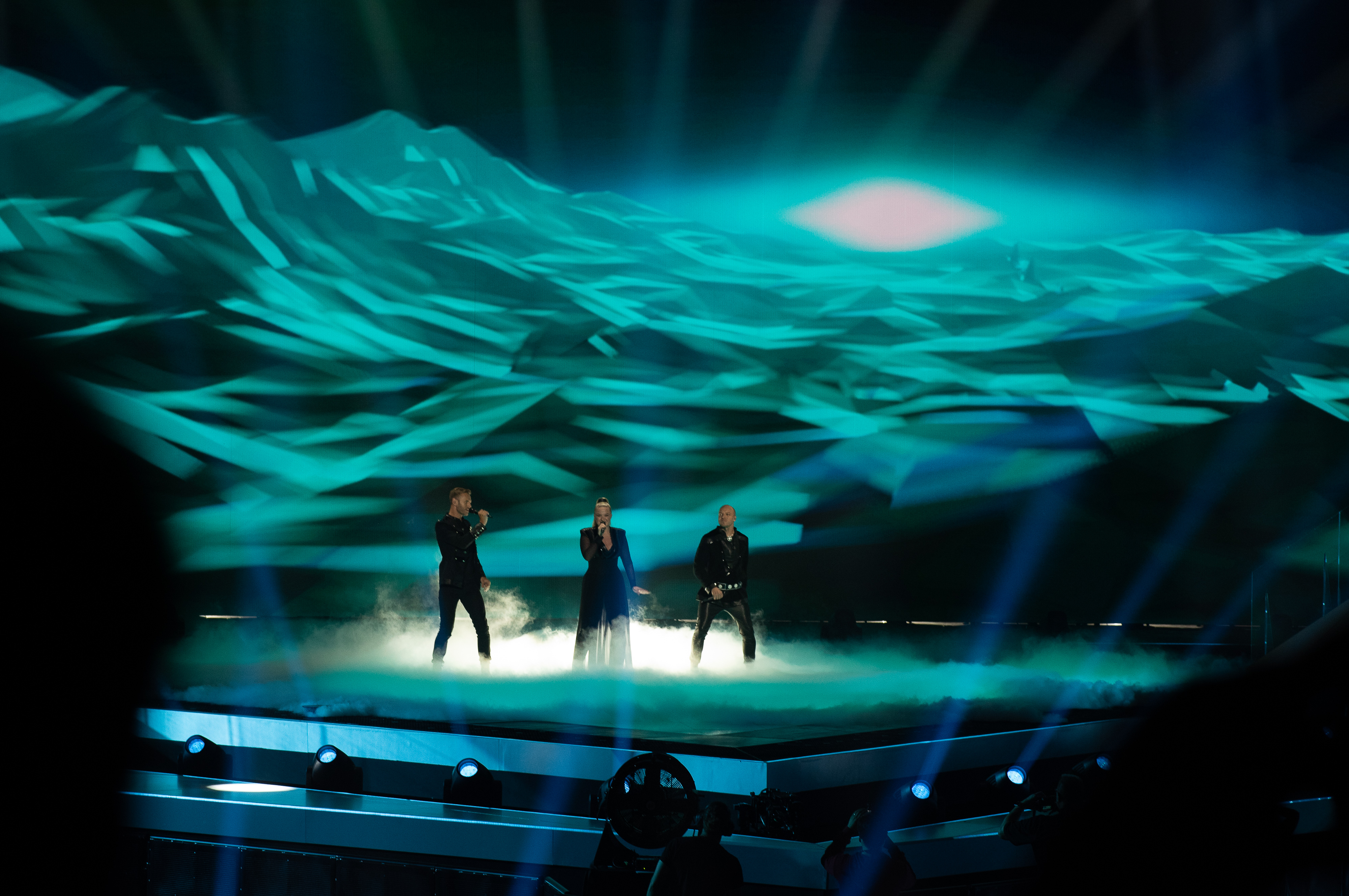
Buljo (right) performing "Spirit in the Sky" with Alexandra Rotan (centre) and Tom Hugo (left) as the group Keiino during the Semi-final dress rehearsal for the Eurovision Song Contest 2019 in Tel Aviv, Israel

Since then, he has toured in the Nordic countries and Russia, and has worked both as a songwriter and as a performer. In 2019, he participated in the Melodi Grand Prix as part of the group KEiiNO and won with the song "Spirit in the Sky".

== Political career ==
Buljo has also served as representative on the Sámi Parliament of Norway for the party Árja, first as a deputy from 2013 to 2016, and as an MP and parliamentary leader in the period 2016–2017.

== Awards ==
In December 2019, Buljo beat Ella Marie Hætta Isaksen with 46.3% of the votes over her 32.87% to win Ávvir's Saami of the Year Award.

== Discography ==
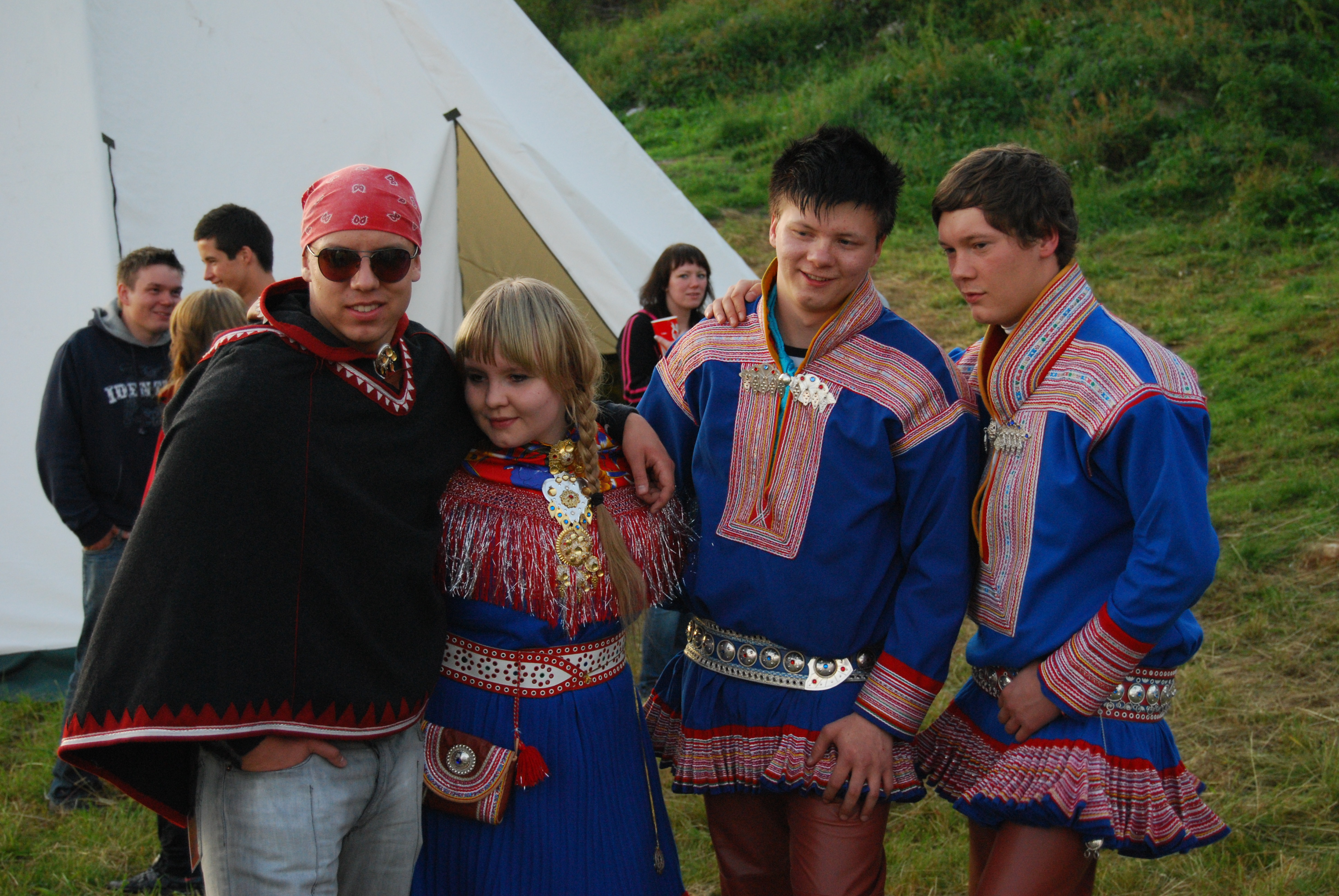
Fred Buljo in left, as part of Duolva Duottar

=== As part of Duolva Duottar ===
==== Albums ====
- Da lea Duolva Duottar (2011)

==== Singles ====
- "Álggu Loahppa (The End of the Beginning)" (2016)
- "Samestaten (State of Sapmi)" (2017)
- "Offroad" (2017)
- "Samegutt" (2017)
- "Joavnna" (2017)
- "Markanstallu" (2018)

=== As part of Keiino ===
Albums

- Okta (2020)

==== Singles ====
- "Spirit in the Sky" (2019)
- "Shallow" (2019)
- "Praying" (2019)
- "Monument" (2021)
- "Damdiggida" (2024)
