= Melodi Grand Prix 2021 =

59th edition of Melodi Grand Prix

Dates and venue
- Semi-final 1: 16 January 2021
- Semi-final 2: 23 January 2021
- Semi-final 3: 30 January 2021
- Semi-final 4: 6 February 2021
- Semi-final 5: 13 February 2021
- Last chance: 15 February 2021
- Final: 20 February 2021
- Venue: H3 Arena, Fornebu

Organisation
- Broadcaster: Norsk rikskringkasting (NRK)
- Presenters: Ronny Brede Aase; Kåre Magnus Bergh; Ingrid Gjessing Linhave (Semi-final 1–4); Silje Nordnes (Semi-final 5, Second Chance, Final)

Participants
- Number of entries: 26

Vote
- Winning song: "Fallen Angel" by Tix

Melodi Grand Prix 2021 was the 59th edition of the Norwegian music competition Melodi Grand Prix (MGP). The contest served as the country's preselection for the Eurovision Song Contest 2021. The competition was organized by NRK and was held between 16 January 2021 and 20 February 2021. A total of 26 songs participated – the highest number in the history of the competition.

The competition consisted of five semi-finals, a last chance show (wild card), and the final on Saturday 20 February 2021. A total of twelve songs participated in the final. Of these, six songs were pre-qualified, while the rest had to qualify through the five semi-finals and the wild card show. All shows were broadcast live from the H3 Arena in Fornebu, just outside Oslo.

The contest was won by the song "Fallen Angel" by Tix. The song therefore represented Norway in the Eurovision Song Contest 2021 in Rotterdam, Netherlands.

== Format ==
The contest was held without an audience due to the COVID-19 pandemic in Norway.

=== Presenters ===
The competition was hosted by the same three presenters as the previous edition: Kåre Magnus Bergh hosted for the seventh time, whereas Ronny Brede Aase and Ingrid Gjessing Linhave hosted the show for the second time. Linhave left the show from the fifth semi-final, citing long-term back problems, and was replaced by Silje Nordnes.

== Competing entries ==
Song submissions were open from 15 May 2020 to 16 August 2020. The competing entries in each semi-final were revealed five days before their respective semi-final's scheduled airdate. The six pre-qualified acts were revealed on 11 January 2021, along with the competing entries in the first semi-final.

Competing entries
Artist	Song	Composer(s)
Ane.Fin	"Walking in My Sleep"	Ane Caroline Finstad, Niklas Rosström, Espen Andreas Fjeld, Kim Rune Hagen, Vebjørn Jernberg
Atle Pettersen	"World on Fire"	Atle Pettersen, Jesper Borgen, Magnus Clausen, Alexander Standal Pavelich, Peter Daniel Newman
Beady Belle	"Playing with Fire"	Beady Belle
Big Daddy Karsten	"Smile"	Karsten Dahl Marcussen, Are Næsset, Pål Gauslaa Sivertzen
Blåsemafian feat. Hazel	"Let Loose"	Jørgen Lund Karlsen, Sigurd Evensen, Stig Espen Hundsnes, Benjamin Sefring, Caroline Teigen
Daniel Owen	"Psycho"	Daniel Elmhari, Paria Ahmadzade, Marius Hongve, Henrik Høven, Patrick Brizard, Jørgen Troøyen, Leif Inge Fosen, Marcus Nilsen Ulstad
Dinaye	"Own Yourself"	Christian Ingebrigtsen, David Thulin, Dina Matheussen
Emmy	"Witch Woods"	Olli Äkräs, Elsa Søllesvik, Morten Franck
Imerika	"I Can't Escape"	Erika Dahlen, Bjørn Olav Edvardsen, Morten Franck, Ben Adams
Jorn	"Faith Bloody Faith"	Åge Sten Nilsen, Jørn Lande, Eirik Renton, Kjell Åge Karlsen
Kaja Rode	"Feel Again"	Magnus Martinsen, Mirjam Johanne Omdal, Andreas Gjone, Erika Dahlen
Keiino	"Monument"	Tom Hugo Hermansen, Alexander Nyborg Olsson, Fred Buljo, Alexandra Rotan, Rüdiger Schramm
Ketil Stokkan	"My Life Is OK"	Ketil Stokkan
Kiim	"My Lonely Voice"	Kim Rune Hagen, Espen Andreas Fjeld, Vebjørn Jernberg, Niklas Rosström
Landeveiens Helter	"Alt det der"	Lars-Erik Blokkhus, Petter Bjørklund Kristiansen, Thor-Erik Claussen
Maria Solheim	"Nordlyset"	Andreas Gjone, Camilla North, Elsbeth Rehder, Torgeir Ryssevik, Maria Solheim
Marianne Pentha & Mikkel Gaup	"Pages"	Vanessa Liftig, Robin Lynch, Marianne Pentha, Mikkel Gaup
Ole Hartz	"Vi er Norge"	Rein Mellbye Van Vliet, Eirik Næss, Ole F. Hartz Gravbråten, Magnus Hagen Clausen, Petter Bjørklund Kristiansen
Raylee	"Hero"	Andreas Stone Johansson, Anderz Wrethov, Laurell Barker, Thomas Stengaard, Frazer Mac
Rein Alexander	"Eyes Wide Open"	Rein Alexander Korshamn, Christian Ingebrigtsen, Kjetil Mørland
River	"Coming Home"	Thomas Heiland, Lennart Karlsen, Magnus Claussen, Simen Meland Handeland, Tommy La Vardi
Royane	"Circus"	Royane Harkati
Stavangerkameratene	"Who I Am" (Note: "Barndomsgater", the Norwegian version of "Who I Am", was originally entered into the contest, and was performed in the second semi-final. The song was later changed to the English version.)	Tommy Fredvang, Lars Horn Lavik, Robin Sharma, Glenn Lyse
Stina Talling	"Elevate"	Bård Mathias Bonsaksen, Hilda Stenmalm, Stina Talling, Eirik Hella, Monika Engeseth
Tix	"Fallen Angel" (Note: "Ut av mørket", the Norwegian version of "Fallen Angel", was originally entered into the contest, and was performed in the first semi-final. The song was later changed to the English version.)	Andreas Haukeland
TuVeia	"Bli med meg på gar'n"	Kristian Galaaen Bredalslien, Roar Galaaen Bredalslien, Bendik Johnsen, Torgeir Ryssevik, Carl-Henrik Wahl, Jonas Holteberg Jensen, Sindre Timberlid Jenssen, Sarah A. V. Johnston

== Semi-finals ==
=== Semi-final 1 ===
The entries competing in the first semi-final were revealed on 11 January 2021, and the semi-final took place on 16 January 2021.

Semi-final 1: 16 January 2021
Duel	R/O	Artist	Song	Result
Duel 1	1	Stina Talling	"Elevate"	Gold Duel
Duel 1	2	Beady Belle	"Playing with Fire"	Second Chance
Duel 2	1	Jorn	"Faith Bloody Faith"	Second Chance
Duel 2	2	Blåsemafian feat. Hazel	"Let Loose"	Gold Duel
Promo	—N/a	Keiino	"Monument"	Pre-qualified
Promo	—N/a	Tix	"Ut av mørket"	Pre-qualified

Gold Duel: 16 January 2021
R/O	Artist	Song	Result
1	Stina Talling	"Elevate"	Second Chance
2	Blåsemafian feat. Hazel	"Let Loose"	Final

=== Semi-final 2 ===
The entries competing in the second semi-final were revealed on 18 January 2021, and the semi-final took place on 23 January 2021.

Semi-final 2: 23 January 2021
Duel	R/O	Artist	Song	Result
Duel 1	1	Ketil Stokkan	"My Life Is OK"	Second Chance
Duel 1	2	Daniel Owen	"Psycho"	Gold Duel
Duel 2	1	Raylee	"Hero"	Gold Duel
Duel 2	2	Maria Solheim	"Nordlyset"	Second Chance
Promo	—N/a	Stavangerkameratene	"Barndomsgater"	Pre-qualified

Gold Duel: 23 January 2021
R/O	Artist	Song	Result
1	Daniel Owen	"Psycho"	Second Chance
2	Raylee	"Hero"	Final

=== Semi-final 3 ===
The entries competing in the third semi-final were revealed on 25 January 2021, and the semi-final took place on 30 January 2021.

Semi-final 3: 30 January 2021
Duel	R/O	Artist	Song	Result
Duel 1	1	Dinaye	"Own Yourself"	Second Chance
Duel 1	2	Big Daddy Karsten	"Smile"	Gold Duel
Duel 2	1	Emmy	"Witch Woods"	Gold Duel
Duel 2	2	Ole Hartz	"Vi er Norge"	Second Chance
Promo	—N/a	Kaja Rode	"Feel Again"	Pre-qualified

Gold Duel: 30 January 2021
R/O	Artist	Song	Result
1	Big Daddy Karsten	"Smile"	Second Chance
2	Emmy	"Witch Woods"	Final

=== Semi-final 4 ===
The entries competing in the fourth semi-final were revealed on 1 February 2021, and the semi-final took place on 6 February 2021.

Semi-final 4: 6 February 2021
Duel	R/O	Artist	Song	Result
Duel 1	1	Marianne Pentha & Mikkel Gaup	"Pages"	Gold Duel
Duel 1	2	Landeveiens Helter	"Alt det der"	Second Chance
Duel 2	1	Kiim	"My Lonely Voice"	Gold Duel
Duel 2	2	Royane	"Circus"	Second Chance
Promo	—N/a	Atle Pettersen	"World on Fire"	Pre-qualified

Gold Duel: 6 February 2021
R/O	Artist	Song	Result
1	Marianne Pentha & Mikkel Gaup	"Pages"	Second Chance
2	Kiim	"My Lonely Voice"	Final

=== Semi-final 5 ===
The entries competing in the fifth semi-final were revealed on 8 February 2021, and the semi-final took place on 13 February 2021.

Semi-final 5: 13 February 2021
Duel	R/O	Artist	Song	Result
Duel 1	1	TuVeia	"Bli med meg på gar'n"	Second Chance
Duel 1	2	River	"Coming Home"	Gold Duel
Duel 2	1	Ane.Fin	"Walking in My Sleep"	Second Chance
Duel 2	2	Imerika	"I Can't Escape"	Gold Duel
Promo	—N/a	Rein Alexander	"Eyes Wide Open"	Pre-qualified

Gold Duel: 13 February 2021
R/O	Artist	Song	Result
1	River	"Coming Home"	Second Chance
2	Imerika	"I Can't Escape"	Final

== Last chance ==
The last chance round took place on 15 February 2021.

Last chance: 15 February 2021
R/O	Artist	Song	Result
1	Beady Belle	"Playing with Fire"	—N/a
2	Jorn	"Faith Bloody Faith"	Final
3	Stina Talling	"Elevate"	—N/a
4	Ketil Stokkan	"My Life Is OK"	—N/a
5	Maria Solheim	"Nordlyset"	—N/a
6	Daniel Owen	"Psycho"	—N/a
7	Dinaye	"Own Yourself"	—N/a
8	Ole Hartz	"Vi er Norge"	—N/a
9	Big Daddy Karsten	"Smile"	—N/a
10	Landeveiens Helter	"Alt det der"	—N/a
11	Royane	"Circus"	—N/a
12	Marianne Pentha & Mikkel Gaup	"Pages"	—N/a
13	Ane.Fin	"Walking in My Sleep"	—N/a
14	TuVeia	"Bli med meg på gar'n"	—N/a
15	River	"Coming Home"	—N/a

== Final ==
Twelve songs consisting of the five semi-finals winners and one Second Chance alongside the six pre-qualified songs competed in the final which was hosted by H3 Arena, Fornebu on 20 February 2021. In the first round, all twelve finalists performed once, after which the four best songs proceeded to the gold final. After the second voting round, the two best songs from the gold final proceeded to the gold duel. A third voting round then determined the winner of Melodi Grand Prix 2021.

After the gold duel, the results of the online voting were revealed by representatives of Norway's five regions, which led to the victory of "Fallen Angel" performed by Tix.

Final: 20 February 2021
R/O	Artist	Song	Result
1	Atle Pettersen	"World on Fire"	—N/a
2	Raylee	"Hero"	—N/a
3	Stavangerkameratene	"Who I Am"	—N/a
4	Kiim	"My Lonely Voice"	—N/a
5	Blåsemafian feat. Hazel	"Let Loose"	Gold Final
6	Emmy	"Witch Woods"	—N/a
7	Tix	"Fallen Angel"	Gold Final
8	Kaja Rode	"Feel Again"	—N/a
9	Rein Alexander	"Eyes Wide Open"	—N/a
10	Imerika	"I Can't Escape"	—N/a
11	Keiino	"Monument"	Gold Final
12	Jorn	"Faith Bloody Faith"	Gold Final

Gold Final: 20 February 2021
R/O	Artist	Song	Result
1	Blåsemafian feat. Hazel	"Let Loose"	—N/a
2	Tix	"Fallen Angel"	Gold Duel
3	Keiino	"Monument"	Gold Duel
4	Jorn	"Faith Bloody Faith"	—N/a

Gold Duel: 20 February 2021
R/O	Artist	Song	South		Central		North		West		East		Total		Place
R/O	Artist	Song	Votes	%	Votes	%	Votes	%	Votes	%	Votes	%	Votes	%	Place
1	Keiino	"Monument"	27,666	42.80	38,850	45.29	42,437	60.16	58,942	41.56	113,148	37.94	281,043	42.51	2
2	Tix	"Fallen Angel"	36,996	57.20	46,937	54.71	28,105	39.84	82,891	58.44	185,104	62.06	380,033	57.49	1

== Incidents ==
After the second semi-final, NRK revealed that there had been technical difficulties in the first two semi-finals, which caused votes from devices with older iOS and Android operating systems to be rejected. NRK stated that the results of the semi-finals were unaffected. The system was corrected for the later shows.

After the final, it was reported by Norwegian newspaper Verdens Gang that voting issues had again occurred in the final, and that some viewers' votes had not been counted. NRK stated that the voting system had interpreted the large number of votes as suspicious, and confirmed that the error did not affect the results.

== Ratings ==
Viewing figures by show
Show	Air date	Viewers (millions)	Share	Ref.
Semi-final 1	16 January 2021	0.784	46%	
Semi-final 2	23 January 2021	0.717	48%	
Semi-final 3	30 January 2021	0.668	47%	
Semi-final 4	6 February 2021	0.758	52%	
Semi-final 5	13 February 2021	0.706	–	
Second Chance	15 February 2021	–	–	
Final	20 February 2021	1.110	67%	

== See also ==
- Norway in the Eurovision Song Contest
- Norway in the Eurovision Song Contest 2021
- Eurovision Song Contest 2021
