= Okta (album) =

Studio album by Keiino
- Released: 8 May 2020
- Length: 31:24
- Label: Hugoworld AS
- Producers: Tom Hugo Hermansen; Jonas Kröper; Rüdiger Schramm; Henrik Tala; Alf Vaksdal

Singles from Okta
- 1. "Spirit in the Sky" Released: 25 January 2019; 2. "Praying" Released: 21 June 2019; 3. "Dancing in the Smoke" Released: 18 October 2019; 4. "Colours" Released: 31 January 2020; 5. "Black Leather" Released: 28 February 2020; 6. "Would I Lie" Released: 3 April 2020

Okta (stylized in all caps) is the debut studio album by Norwegian supergroup Keiino, released on 8 May 2020. The album peaked at number 30 on the Norwegian Albums Chart. The album includes collaborations with a number of indigenous artists worldwide, including Electric Fields (Australia), Te Hau Tawhiti (New Zealand), Drezus (North America), and Charlotte Qamaniq (Canada).

In an interview with Wiwibloggs, group member Alexandra Rotan stated that "okta" means "one" in Northern Sámi. Rotan said "All the songs have been written after Eurovision, so I think it had a huge impact on how the album turned out... We created the album on the road. We wrote the songs on the plane, backstage and in hotel rooms. And the songs with Te Hau Tawhiti and Electric Fields were written when we were on tour in Australia."

== Reception ==
Scandipop said "If a better pop album is released in 2020, we'll be shocked, we'll be stunned, and we'll be – well – obviously delighted, too, in fairness."

== Track listing ==
=== Okta (standard edition) ===
No.	Title	Writer(s)	Length
1.	"Take Me Home"	Fred-René Buljo; Tom Hugo Hermansen; Alexander N Olsson; Alexandra Rotan; Rüdiger Schramm	3:16
2.	"Black Leather" (featuring Charlotte Qamaniq)	Buljo; Hermansen; Olsson; Charlotte Qamaniq; Rotan; Schramm; Henrik Tala	3:30
3.	"Would I Lie" (featuring Electric Fields)	Buljo; Zaachariaha Fielding; Hermansen; Olsson; Michael Ross; Rotan	3:15
4.	"Spirit in the Sky"	Buljo; Hermansen; Olsson; Rotan; Schramm; Tala	3:05
5.	"Dancing in the Smoke"	Buljo; Hermansen; Ash Hicklin; Jonas Kröper; Rotan	3:11
6.	"Roar Like a Lion" (featuring Te Hau Tawhiti)	Buljo; Hermansen; Olsson; Rotan; Alf Vaksdal; Te Waikamihi	3:08
7.	"Praying"	Buljo; Hermansen; Olsson; Rotan; Schramm; Tala	3:11
8.	"Colours"	Buljo; Hermansen; Olsson; Rotan; Schramm	2:44
9.	"Louder" (featuring Drezus)	Buljo; Hermansen; Jeremiah Manitopyes; Olsson; Rotan; Schramm	3:26
10.	"Bed with the Wolf"	Hermansen; Olsson; Schramm	2:35

=== Okta - Guokte edition (bonus tracks) ===
No.	Title	Length
15.	"Venus"	3:12
16.	"End of Time (Taste of Heaven)"	2:50
17.	"Transarctic Lover" (with Sordal)	2:55
18.	"Addjas"	2:57
19.	"A New Beginning" (with Peder Elias)	3:03

== Charts ==
Chart (2020)	Peak position
Norwegian Albums (VG-lista)	30
UK Album Downloads (Official Charts)	63
UK Indie Album Breakers (OCC)	15

== Release history ==
Country	Date	Format	Label	Catalogue
Various	8 May 2020	CD, digital download, streaming	Hugoworld AS	HW2003
Norway	October 2021	Deluxe CD	Hugoworld AS	
Various (Guokte)	25 February 2022	digital download, streaming	Hugoworld AS	
