= Sámi music =

Music within Sámi culture

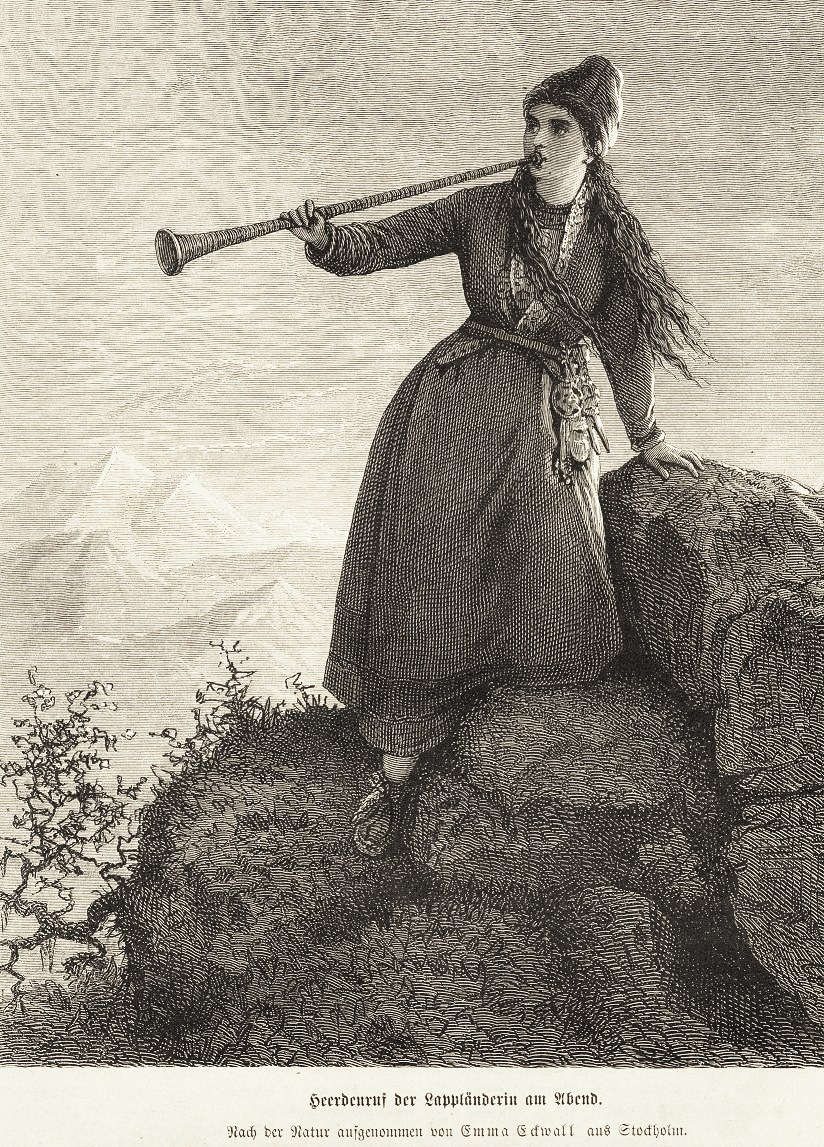
A Nordic Sámi woman playing Lur horn in the evening. A wood cut made by Emma Edwall after nature in the mid-1800s.

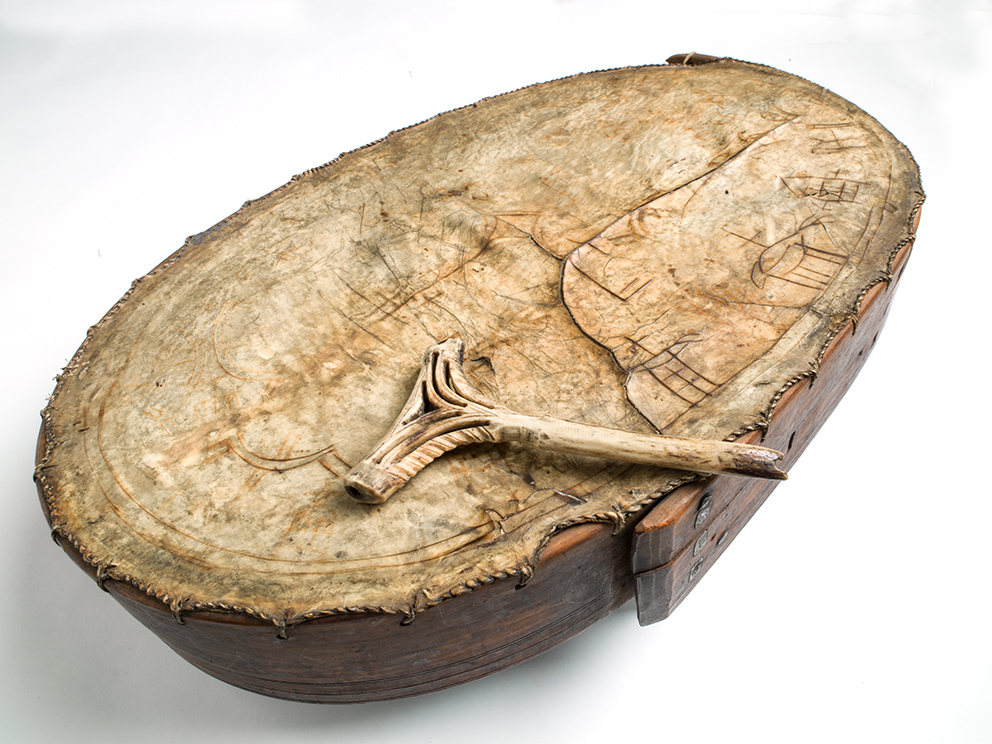
Sámi drum

In traditional Sámi music songs (e.g. Kvad and Leudd songs) and joiks are important musical expressions of the Sámi people and Sámi languages. The Sámi also use a variety of musical instruments, some unique to the Sámi, some traditional Scandinavian, and some modern introductions.

Highly spiritual songs called joiks (Northern Sami: luohti; Southern Sami: vuolle) are the most characteristic song type. (The same word sometimes refers to lavlu or vuelie songs, though this is technically incorrect.) Joiks may have few or no lyrics, do not rhyme, and have no definite structure. They are typically about any subject of importance to the singer, and vary widely in content. In Northern areas each person often has their own joik, sometimes given to them at birth, which is seen as personal to and representative of them, like a name. Purely folk joiks have declined in popularity over the 20th century, due to the influence of pop radio and religious fundamentalism, especially Laestadianism. Joiking first came to prominence within Sweden and Scandinavia as a whole with the 1959 release of Sven-Gösta Jonsson's "I'm a Lapp", which featured the singer singing about joiking towards heathen stones over a modern, skiffle-like beat. The first commercial recordings of joiking were performed by Nils-Aslak Valkeapää in 1968, in Finland. Valkeapää's recordings, however, differed from traditional joiking by including both instrumentation and ambient sounds, such as barking dogs and the wind.

Nevertheless, joik performers of some fame include Angelit (former Angelin tytöt, Girls of Angeli), Wimme Saari and Nils-Aslak Valkeapää from Finnish Sápmi. Many modern singers are signed to DAT, the premier record label in Sámi music.

The most famous Sámi singer is Mari Boine of Norway, who sings a type of minimalist folk-rock with joik roots. Some non-Sámi artists, including RinneRadio, Xymox, and Jan Garbarek, have used joik and other Sámi styles in their music.

The Finnish folk metal band Sháman (now known as Korpiklaani) introduced what some call "yoik metal" in the late 1990s, drawing attention to Sámi music in the heavy metal scene. Their music incorporated Sámi elements such as yoik singing, Sámi lyrics, and shamanic drum. The vocalist has also yoiked for fellow Finnish folk metal band Finntroll. Also Finnish black metal band Barathrum (On Eerie album's first track) and Swedish black metal band Arckanum have used joik parts in couple of their songs.

In January 2008, the Sámi artist Ann Marie Anderson, singing "Ándagassii", qualified to the finals of Melodi Grand Prix 2008, (the Norwegian national selection for the Eurovision Song Contest 2008), but she did not win. In March 2015 the Swedish Sámi artist Jon Henrik Fjallgren came second with his song "Jag ar fri" in the finals in the national selection for the Eurovision Song Contest 2015. In the October 2018 final episode of the Norwegian televised music contest Stjernekamp, 20-year-old Sámi artist Ella Marie Hætta Isaksen was voted the winner; her final performance on the show was a yoik.

At the Eurovision Song Contest itself, joik appeared in Eurovision Song Contest 1980 with "Sámiid ædnan", where Mattis Hætta performed a yoik he had composed, and 2019 thanks to the song "Spirit in the Sky" performed by the KEiiNO trio representing Norway. Parts in this language joik were performed by the Saami singer and rapper Fred Buljo, who is a member of the group. The KEiiNO team won the audience vote, but after adding up the total vote of the jury (40 points) and the audience (170 points), the trio took only 6th place in the general classification of the grand final of the competition.

== Musical instruments ==
Some sources have commented on a supposed lack of musical instruments among the Sámi, with one 1885 work noting: "They cannot claim to possess a single instrument of their own, not even the most primitive." Despite these beliefs, the Sámi employ a variety of musical instruments, several unique to them. Among these instruments are the fadno, a reedpipe made from Angelica archangelica stalks, and the Sámi drum. Late 18th century researchers also noted two bagpipes in Lapland: the sak-pipe and the wal-pipe.

Other Sámi instruments of wider Scandinavian usage include the lur (a long horn trumpet), and the harpu, a zither to the Finnish kantele. Willow flutes are often made from the bark of the quicken tree or mountain ash.

Modern bands use a wide variety of instruments, especially the fiddle, concertina, and accordion.

== Gallery ==
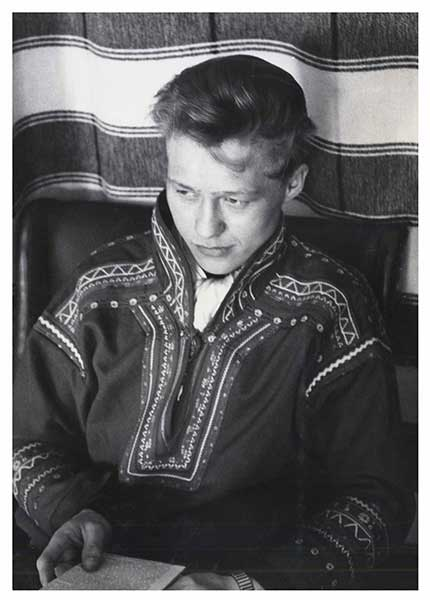
Nils-Aslak Valkeapää, a Finnish-born Norwegian Sámi musician and writer, widely known for his joiks and poems

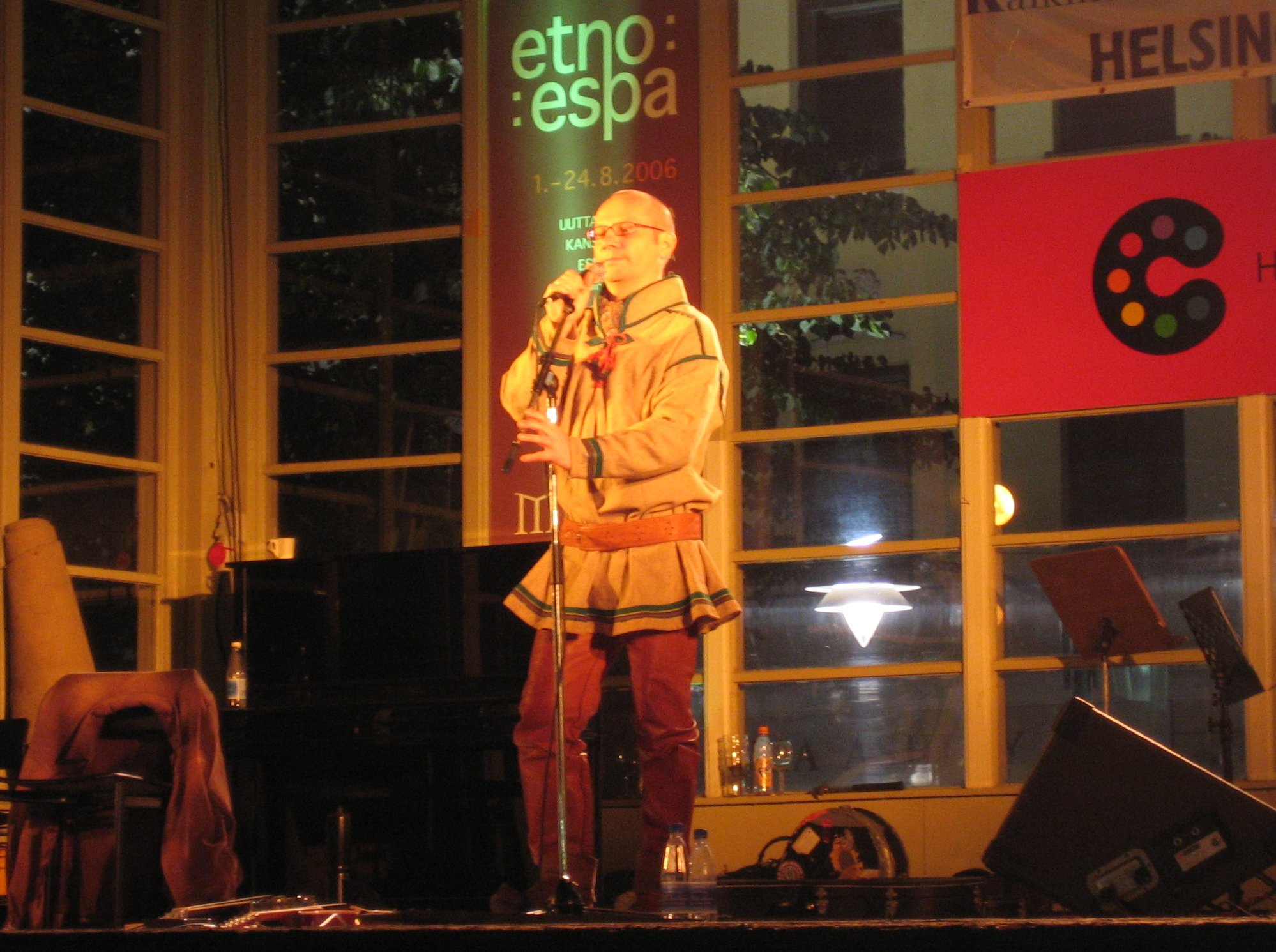
Wimme Saari, a Sámi joiker from Kelottijärvi, Enontekiö

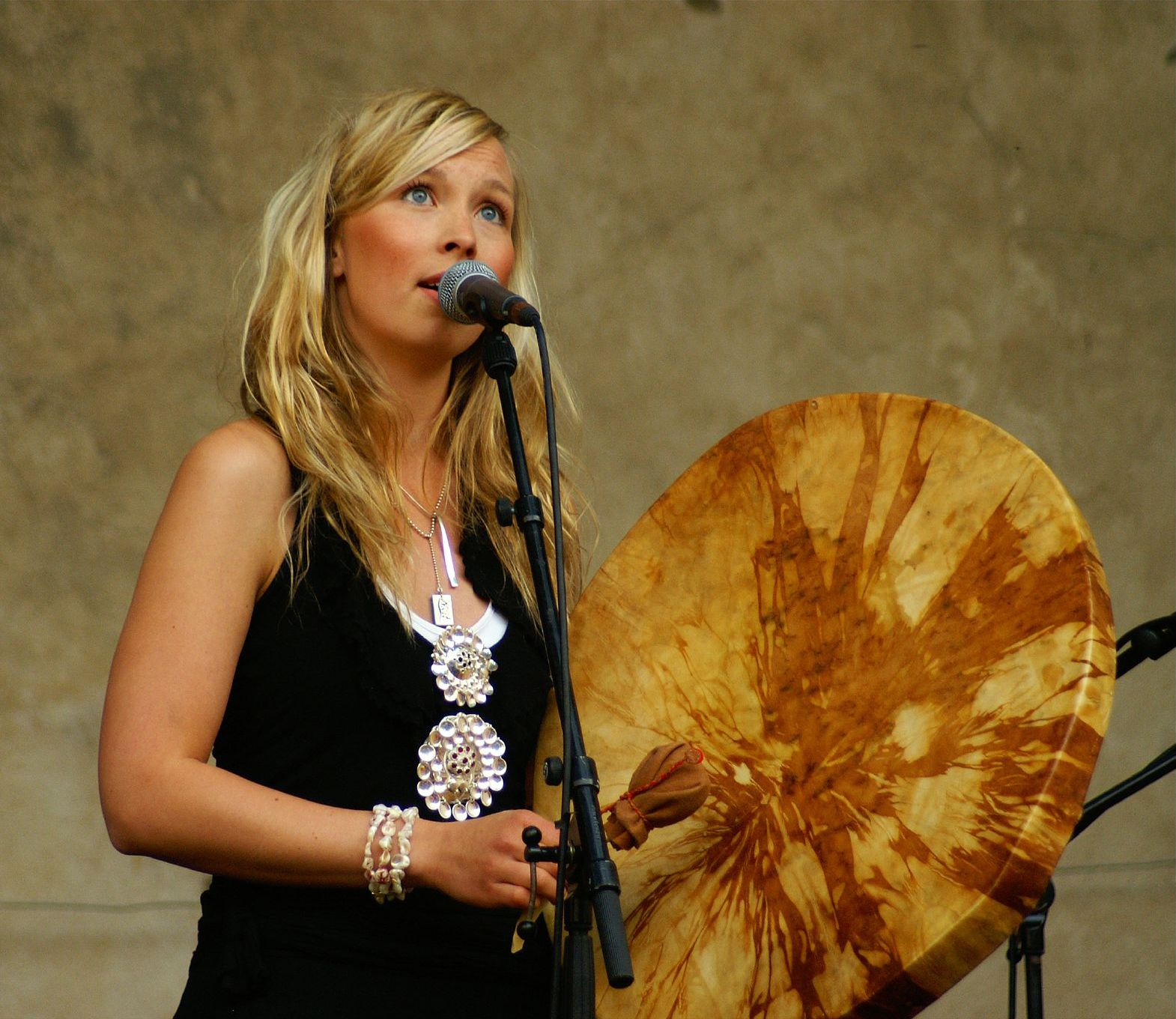
Sámi vocalist and musician from Gällivare, Sofia Jannok, performing at the Centre Culturel Suédois in Paris, France

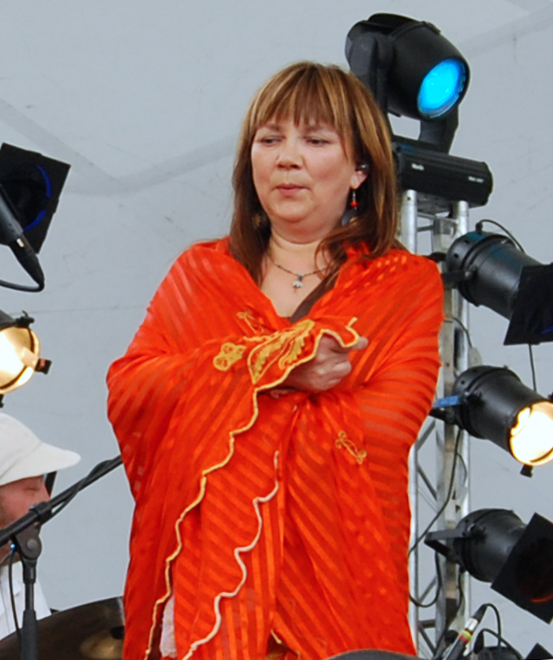
Mari Boine, a Sámi vocalist and musician from Gámehisnjárga (by Kárášjohka), Finnmark

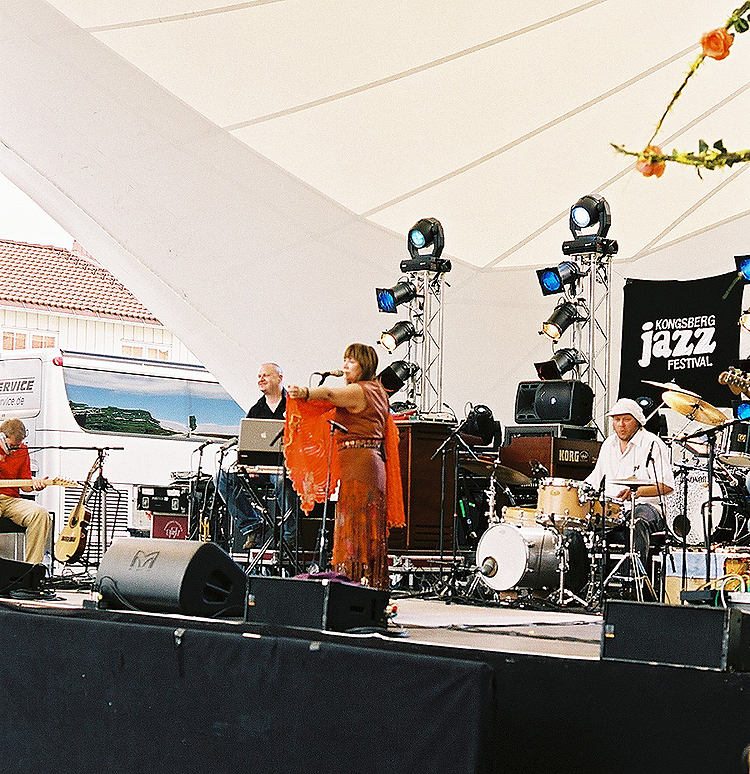
Mari Boine performing at the Kongsberg Jazz in 2007

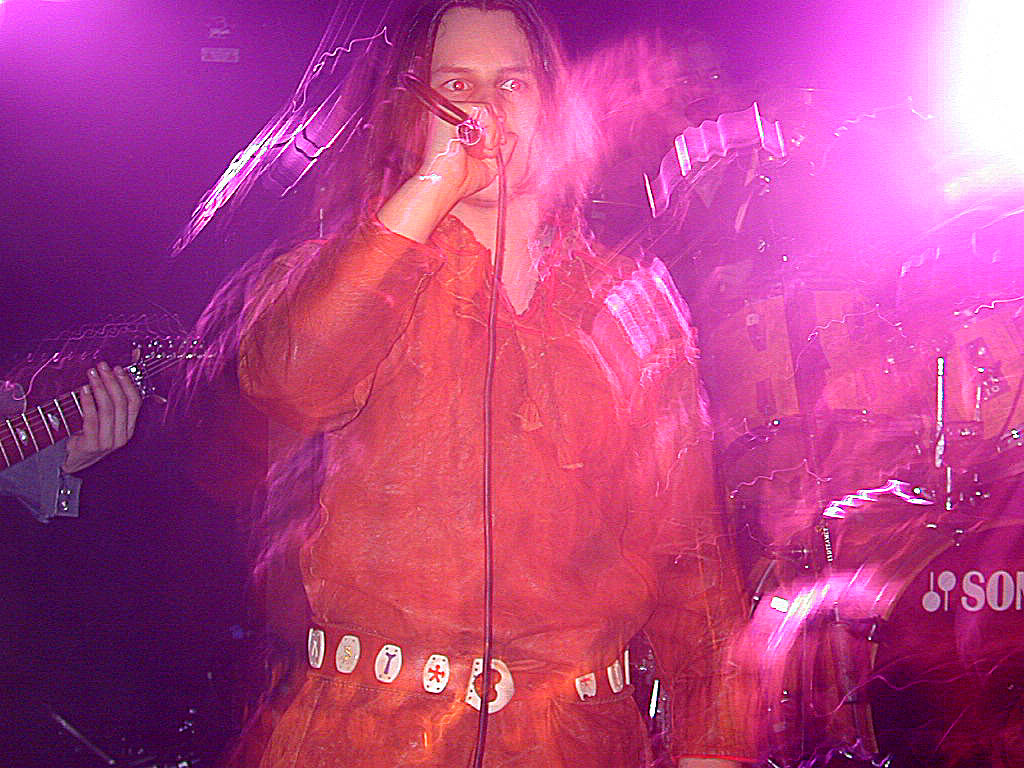
Lawra Somby, Sámi joiker and member of the group Adjágas, making a guest appearance with Norwegian heavy metal band Turdus Musicus

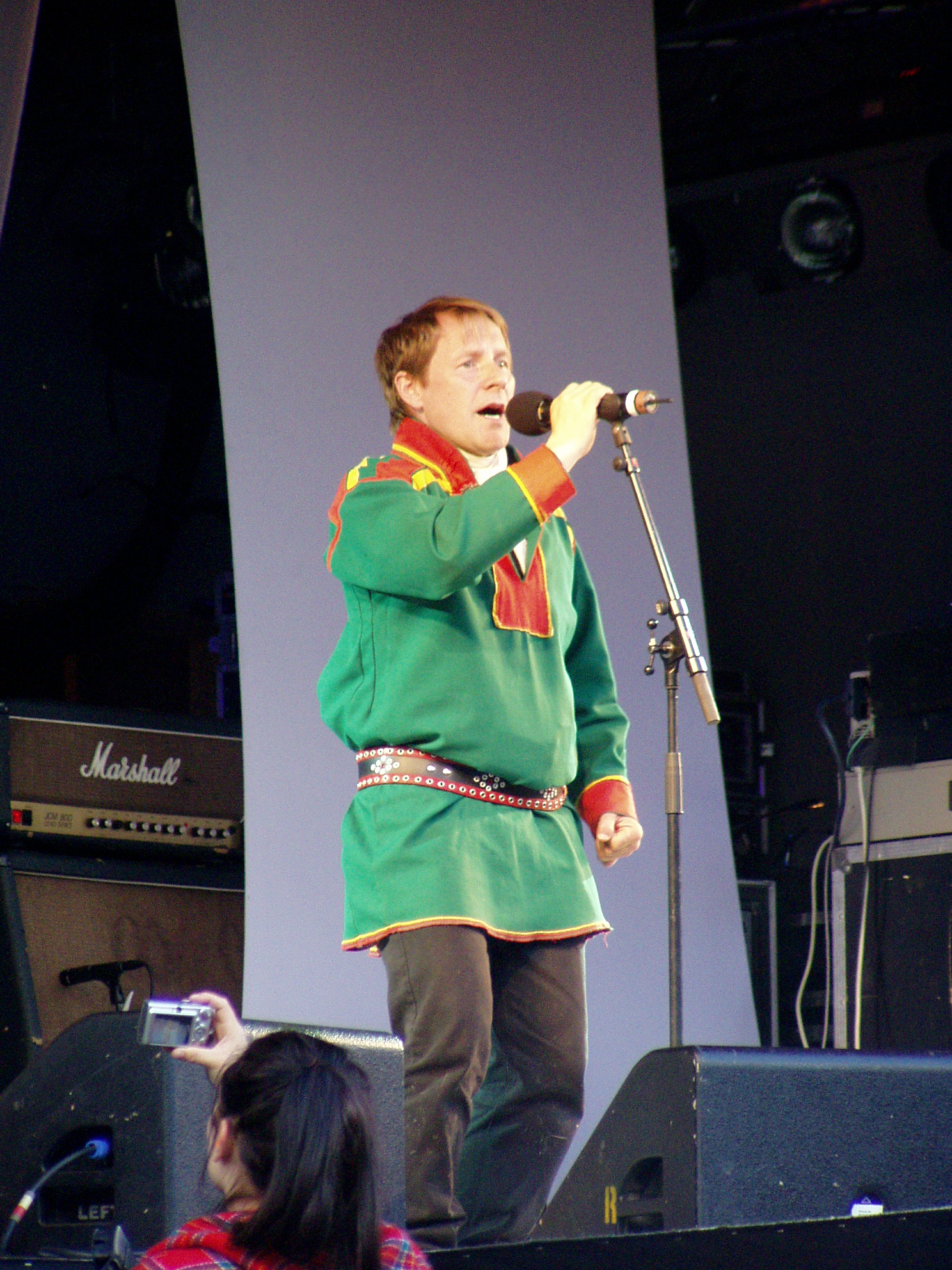
Ande Somby, Sámi vocalist and law professor at the University of Tromsø from Sirbma, Finnmark, performing with his band Vajas at the 2007 Riddu Riđđu festival

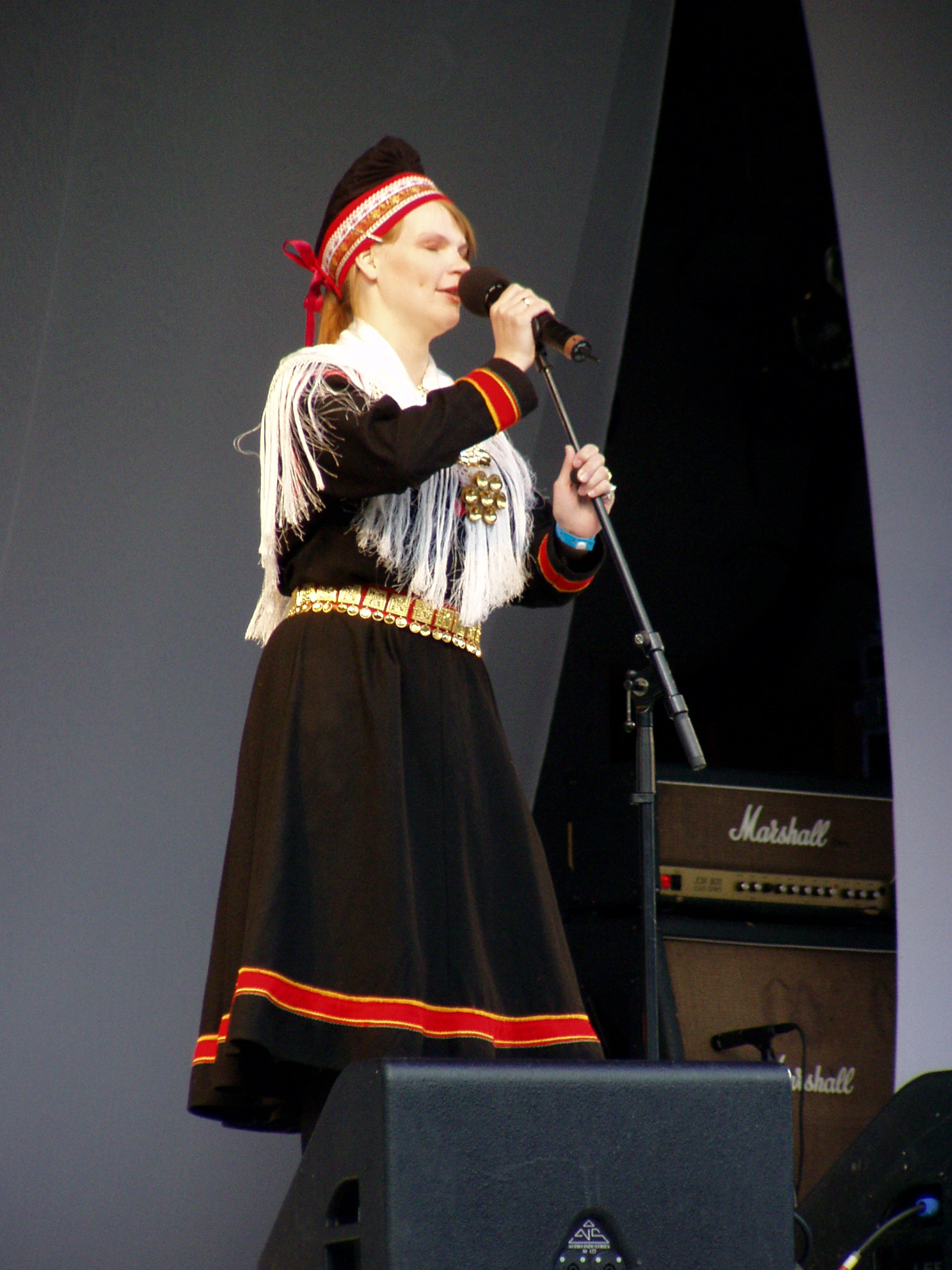
A Sámi vocalist performing at the 2007 Riddu Riđđu festival

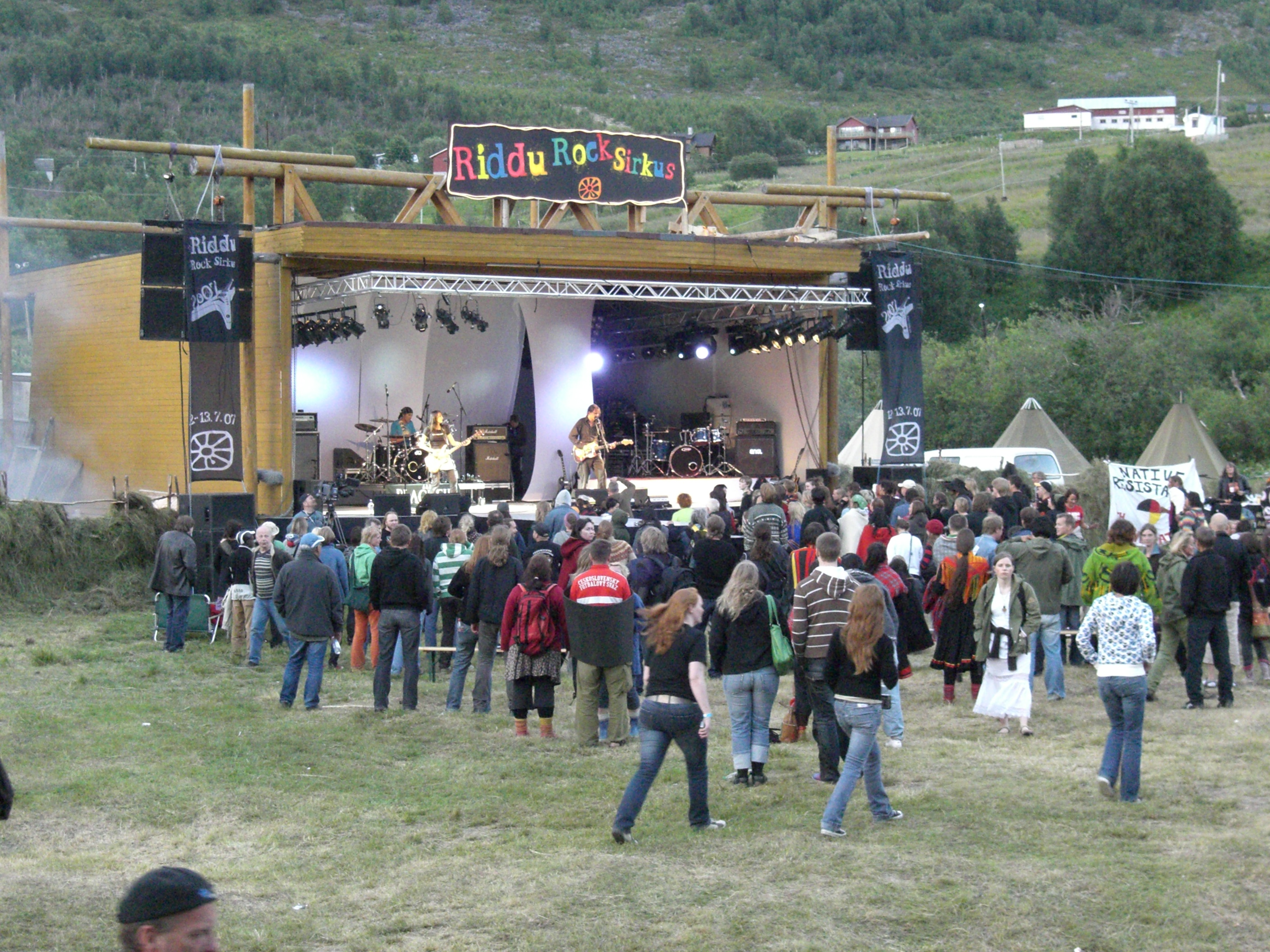
The crowd gathers to watch a rock band perform at the 2007 Riddu Riđđu festival.

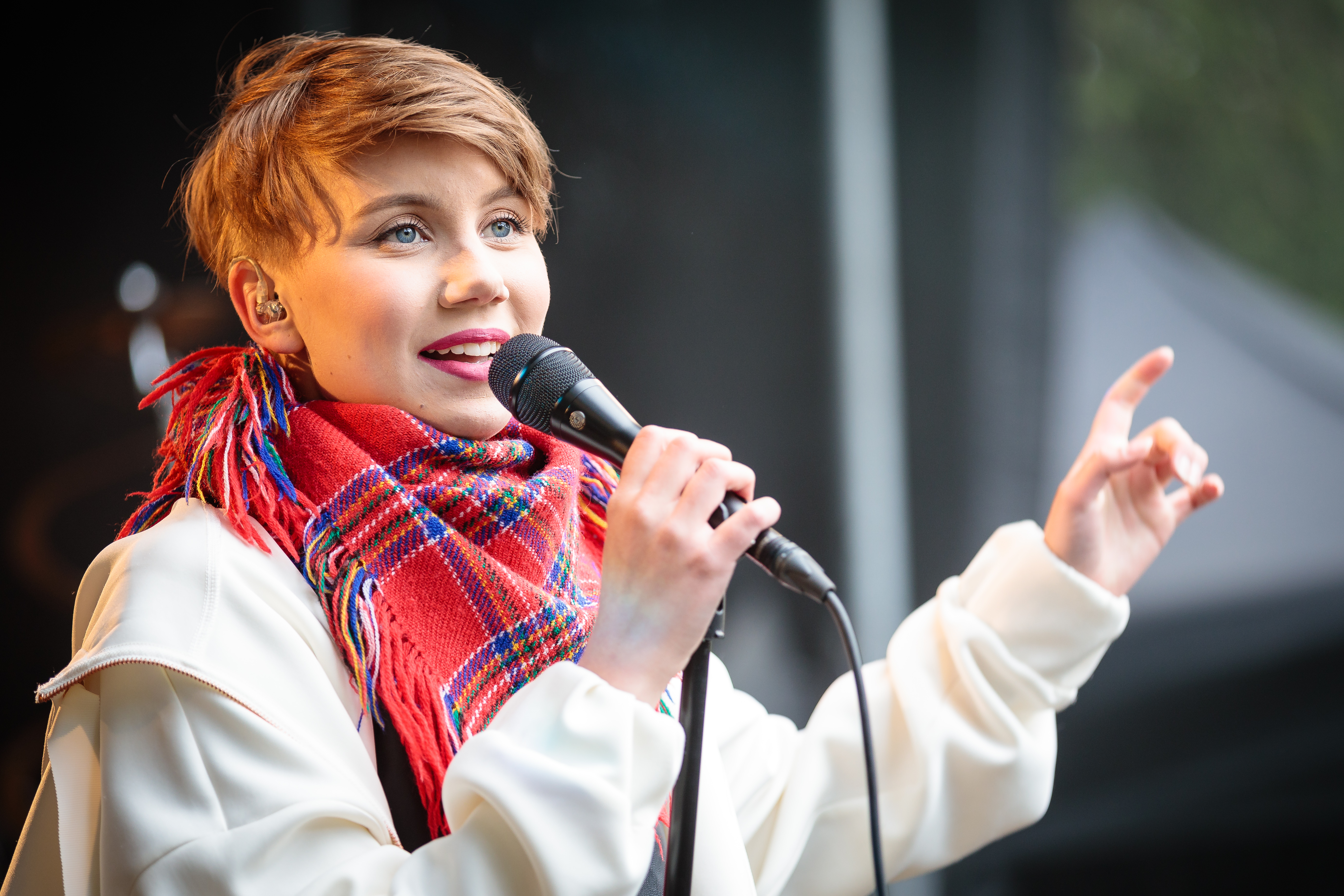
Ella Marie Hætta Isaksen with Isák the DnB-stage at Grefsenkollen

== See also ==
- Adjágas
- Amoc
- Vilddas
- Maxida Märak
