= Keiino =

Norwegian musical group

KEiiNO
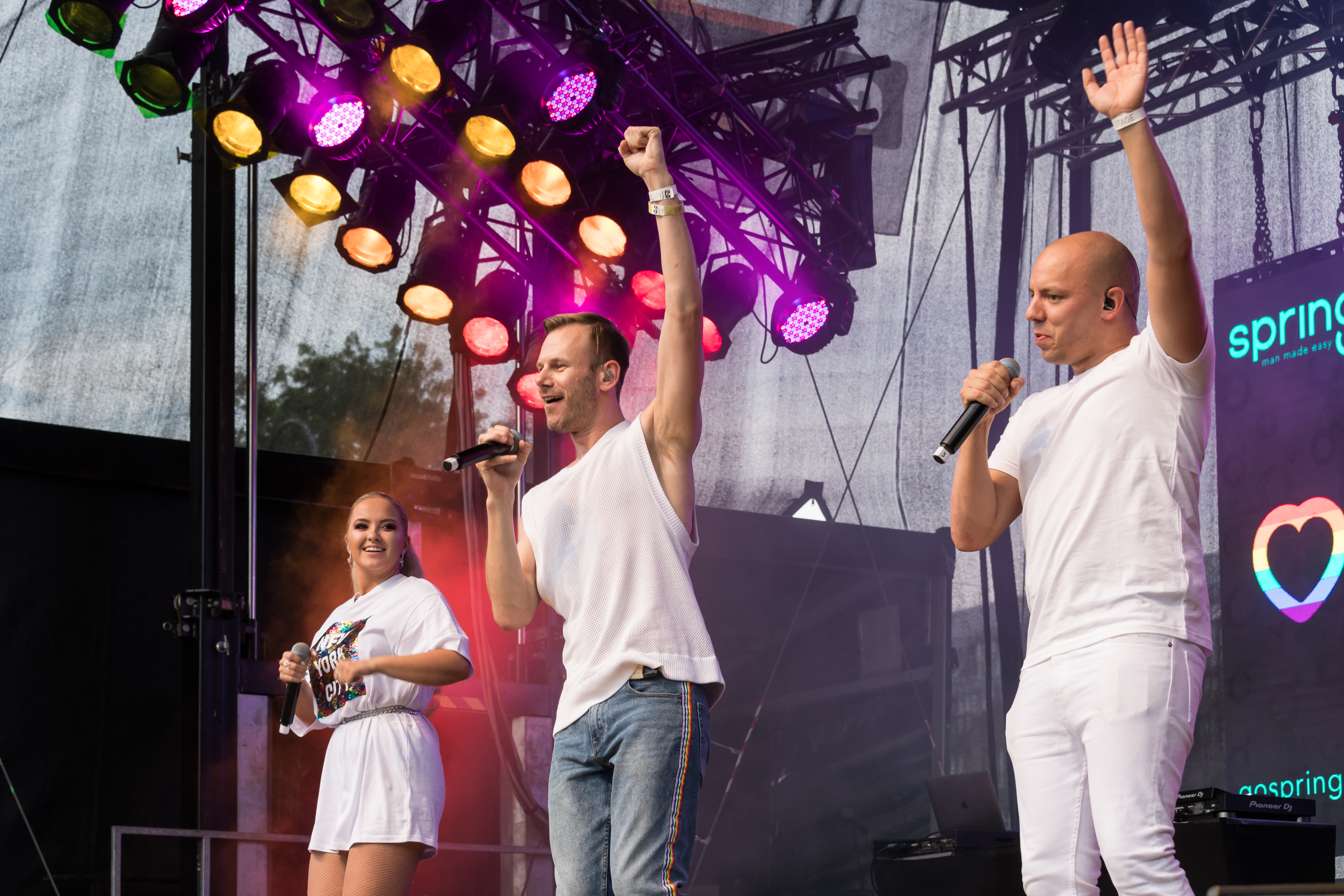
- KEiiNO at Cologne Pride 2019 (left to right: Alexandra, Tom Hugo, Fred)

Background information
- Origin: Norway
- Genres: Electropop; dance-pop; joik; Sámi folk
- Years active: 2018–present
- Members: Tom Hugo; Fred Buljo; Alexandra Rotan
- Website: keiino.com

KEiiNO (/ˈkeɪnoʊ/ KAY-noh, Norwegian: [kæɪˈnoː]; is a Norwegian band consisting of Sámi rapper Fred Buljo and singers Alexandra Rotan and Tom Hugo. The group was created in late 2018 in order to participate in Melodi Grand Prix 2019; they won the competition and were thus selected to represent Norway in the Eurovision Song Contest 2019, where they finished in sixth place and first in the public vote.

== Background and career ==
The group was established in the late summer of 2018 when Tom Hugo and his husband, Alex Olsson, began writing "Spirit in the Sky", a song inspired by historical struggles for equality. They later joined Sámi rapper and joiker Fred-René Buljo and singer Alexandra Rotan. The group name Keiino was inspired by the name of Buljo's home town Kautokeino (Northern Sami: Guovdageaidnu). The last part -geaidnu translates to the 'way' or 'road', which Buljo said "represents the road that brought us together" in an interview with TV 2. In an interview with the Kven-minority-centered media Ruijan Kaiku, Fred Buljo discussed his Kven/Finnish ancestry, and that they had worked with a Finnish producer, and thus landed on the name keino, the Kven variant of North Sami geaidnu 'way'. Alexandra Rotan explained that they each had their own career before Keiino, but it was Keiino that showed them the way to success.

As a result of winning Melodi Grand Prix 2019, the group represented Norway in the Eurovision Song Contest 2019 with the song "Spirit in the Sky". In the second semi-final held on 16 May 2019, they qualified to the final. At the finals, their entry received the highest points from the televoting with a total of 291 points, although combined with their lesser score from the jury groups they finished in sixth place, with 331 points. Following Eurovision, the group was appointed by the Sámi Parliament of Norway as ambassadors for the UN Year of Indigenous Languages.

On 8 May 2020, the group released their debut studio album, Okta. The album peaked at number 30 on the Norwegian chart. Okta was re-issued twice, first as a Norway-only deluxe CD in October 2021, and later as Okta (Guokte) on 24 February 2022.

On 11 January 2021, it was announced that Keiino would participate in the Melodi Grand Prix 2021 final with the pre-qualified song "Monument". The song was released at midnight on 15 January 2021 with the group's debut performance of the song during the first heat of Melodi Grand Prix 2021 on 16 January 2021. The song reached the top four in the final on 20 February 2021, eventually reaching the gold duel, but lost to Tix's "Fallen Angel".

Keiino embarked on an Australian tour in early 2022, which included performances at the Australian national final and the Sydney Gay and Lesbian Mardi Gras. During the tour, Rotan was admitted to hospital due to an infected koala scratch.

They took part in Melodi Grand Prix 2024 with the song "Damdiggida". Advancing from their semi-final, they ultimately finished in second place to Gåte's "Ulveham".

== Discography ==
=== Albums ===
List of studio albums, with selected details
Title	Details	Peak chart positions		
Title	Details	NOR	UK Digital	UK Indie Break.
Okta	Released: 8 May 2020; Label: Hugoworld AS; Formats: CD, digital download, streaming	30	63	15
Chromium Heart	Released: 31 October 2025; Label: Mii Recordings AS; Formats: CD, digital download, streaming	—	—	—
"—" denotes a recording that did not chart or was not released in that territory.

=== Extended plays ===
List of EPs, with selected details
Title	EP details
Midnight Marina	Released: 23 June 2023; Label: Hugoworld AS; Formats: Digital download, streaming

=== Singles ===
==== As lead artist ====
Title	Year	Peak chart positions									Certifications	Album or EP
Title	Year	NOR	AUT	BEL (FL) Tip	IRE	NLD	MKD Air.	SWE	SWI	UK	Certifications	Album or EP
"Spirit in the Sky"	2019	1	61	19	84	55	—	33	7	61	IFPI NOR: 3× Platinum	Okta
"Shallow"	2019	—	—	—	—	—	—	— (Note: "Shallow" did not enter the Swedish Singellista Chart, but peaked at number 12 on the Swedish Heatseeker Chart.)	—	—	IFPI NOR: Platinum	Non-album single
"Praying"	2019	—	—	—	—	—	—	—	—	—		Okta
"Vill ha dig"	2019	—	—	—	—	—	—	—	—	—		Non-album single
"Dancing in the Smoke"	2019	—	—	—	—	—	—	—	—	—		Okta
"Colours"	2020	—	—	—	—	—	—	—	—	—		Okta
"Black Leather" (featuring Charlotte Qamaniq)	2020	—	—	—	—	—	—	—	—	—		Okta
"Would I Lie" (featuring Electric Fields)	2020	—	—	—	—	—	—	—	—	—		Okta
"I Wanna Dance with Somebody (Who Loves Me)"	2020	—	—	—	—	—	—	—	—	—		Non-album single
"Transarctic Lover" (with Sordal)	2020	—	—	—	—	—	—	—	—	—		Okta (Deluxe)
"A Winter's Night"	2020	—	—	—	—	—	—	—	—	—		Non-album single
"Monument"	2021	7	—	—	—	—	—	—	—	—	IFPI NOR: Platinum	Okta (Deluxe)
"Unbreakable"	2021	—	—	—	—	—	—	—	—	—	IFPI NOR: Gold	Okta (Deluxe)
"Drivers License"	2021	—	—	—	—	—	—	—	—	—		Non-album single
"Summer of My Life"	2021	—	—	—	—	—	—	—	—	—		Okta (Deluxe)
"Mellom Bakkar og Berg" (with Kautobahn)	2021	—	—	—	—	—	—	—	—	—		Non-album single
"Addjas"	2021	—	—	—	—	—	—	—	—	—		Okta (Deluxe)
"End of Time (Taste of Heaven)"	2021	—	—	—	—	—	—	—	—	—		Okta (Deluxe)
"Venus"	2021	—	—	—	—	—	—	—	—	—		Okta (Deluxe)
"A New Beginning"	2021	—	—	—	—	—	—	—	—	—		Okta (Deluxe)
"On a Night Like This"	2022	—	—	—	—	—	—	—	—	—		Non-album singles
"Mother of the Night"	2022	—	—	—	—	—	—	—	—	—		Non-album singles
"Nights of Thunder"	2022	—	—	—	—	—	—	—	—	—		Non-album singles
"Alt du kan se"	2023	—	—	—	—	—	—	—	—	—		Midnight Marina
"The Sun Always Shines on TV"	2023	—	—	—	—	—	—	—	—	—		Midnight Marina
"Ritma"	2023	—	—	—	—	—	—	—	—	—		Midnight Marina
"Get Up"	2023	—	—	—	—	—	—	—	—	—		Non-album single
"Insomnia"	2023	—	—	—	—	—	—	—	—	—		Chromium Heart
"Damdiggida"	2024	14	—	—	—	—	—	—	—	—		Chromium Heart
"Hero, Baby"	2024	—	—	—	—	—	—	—	—	—		Non-album singles
"Disco"	2024	—	—	—	—	—	—	—	—	—		Non-album singles
"Say It Like That"	2024	—	—	—	—	—	—	—	—	—		Chromium Heart
"Northern Boy"	2024	—	—	—	—	—	—	—	—	—		Chromium Heart
"Midnight Gloria"	2025	—	—	—	—	—	—	—	—	—		Chromium Heart
"Halo"	2025	—	—	—	—	—	—	—	—	—		Chromium Heart
"Unstoppable"	2025	—	—	—	—	—	—	—	—	—		Chromium Heart
"Demon of Your Love"	2025	—	—	—	—	—	—	—	—	—		Chromium Heart
"End of the Rainbow"	2025	—	—	—	—	—	—	—	—	—		Chromium Heart
"Indigo Night"	2026	—	—	—	—	—	—	—	—	—		Non-album singles
"Freya"	2026	—	—	—	—	—	—	—	—	—		Non-album singles
"Remember My Name"	2026	—	—	—	—	—	15	—	—	—		Non-album singles
"You Raise Me Up" (featuring Jargal)	2026	—	—	—	—	—	—	—	—	—		Non-album singles
"—" denotes a recording that did not chart or was not released in that territory.

==== As featured artist ====
Title	Year	Album or EP
"A New Beginning" (Peder Elias featuring Keiino)	2022	Love & Loneliness

== Awards and nominations ==
Award	Year	Category	Nominee(s)	Result	Ref.
Spellemannprisen	2019	Song of the Year	"Spirit in the Sky"	Nominated	
ESC Radio Awards	2019	Best Group	Keiino	Won	
Sami Music Awards	2020	Open Class	Keiino	Won	
Sami Music Awards	2020	Producer of the Year	Keiino	Won	

== Notes ==
Preceded by Alexander Rybak with "That's How You Write a Song"	Norway in the Eurovision Song Contest; 2019	Succeeded by Ulrikke with "Attention"
