= Tom Hugo =

Norwegian musician

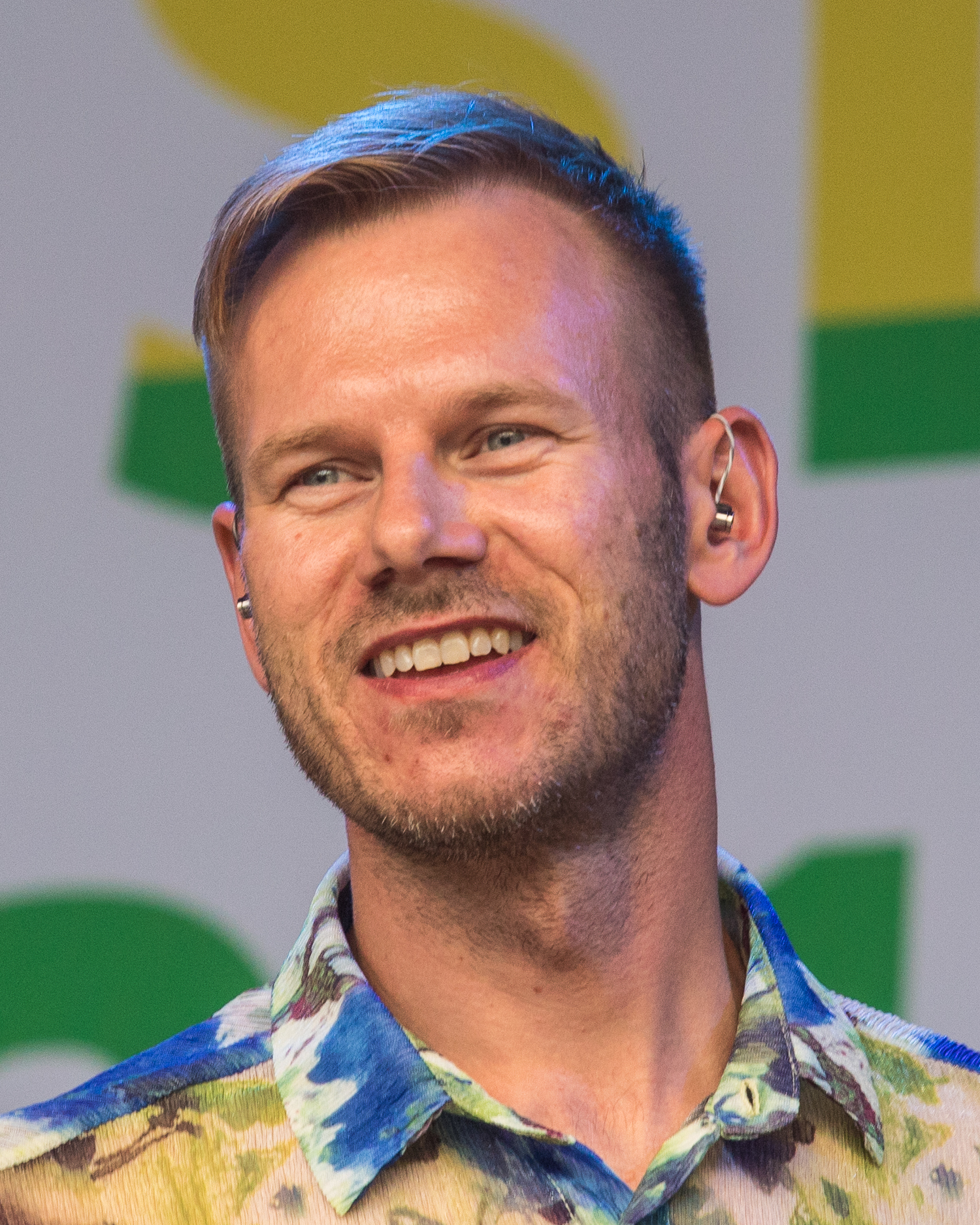
- Tom Hugo at Cologne Pride, 2018

Background information
- Born: Tom Hugo Hermansen; 29 October 1979 (age 46); Kristiansand, Norway
- Genres: Indie pop; dance-pop
- Occupations: Singer; songwriter
- Instrument: Vocals
- Years active: 2007–present
- Website: radiojam.no keiino.com

Tom Hugo Hermansen (born 29 October 1979 in Kristiansand), better known as simply Tom Hugo, is a Norwegian singer, songwriter and musician. He is currently living in Oslo.

== Career ==
=== Recording artist ===
In 2007, Hugo moved to Hamburg and started working with Káme Entertainment and All Access Entertainment. In 2009, I apologise EP was released on the indie-label BrilJant/Indigo. He released his debut-album Sundry Tales in Germany June 2012. The single "Open Up Your Eyes" released in summer 2011 peaked at #100 on German radio-charts.

Sundry Tales was also released in Norway on HW Records/Musikkoperatørene, and peaked at 23rd place on the Norwegian charts. The single "Open Up Your Eyes" peaked at #20 on the Norwegian radio-charts, and follow-up single "Million Doors" was A-listed 12 weeks at Norway's largest radio-station (NRK P1).

Hugo has played many live-shows in both his home-countries, including a support-tour for The Overtones and festivals like Palmesus 2012, Welt Astra Tag, Reeperbahn-festival and Quart 09. He has also played live on the TV shows ZDF MorgenMagazin and God Morgen Norge (TV2-Norway), and was in the prime-time TV show Beat for Beat in Norway on 23 September 2012.

=== Melodi Grand Prix ===
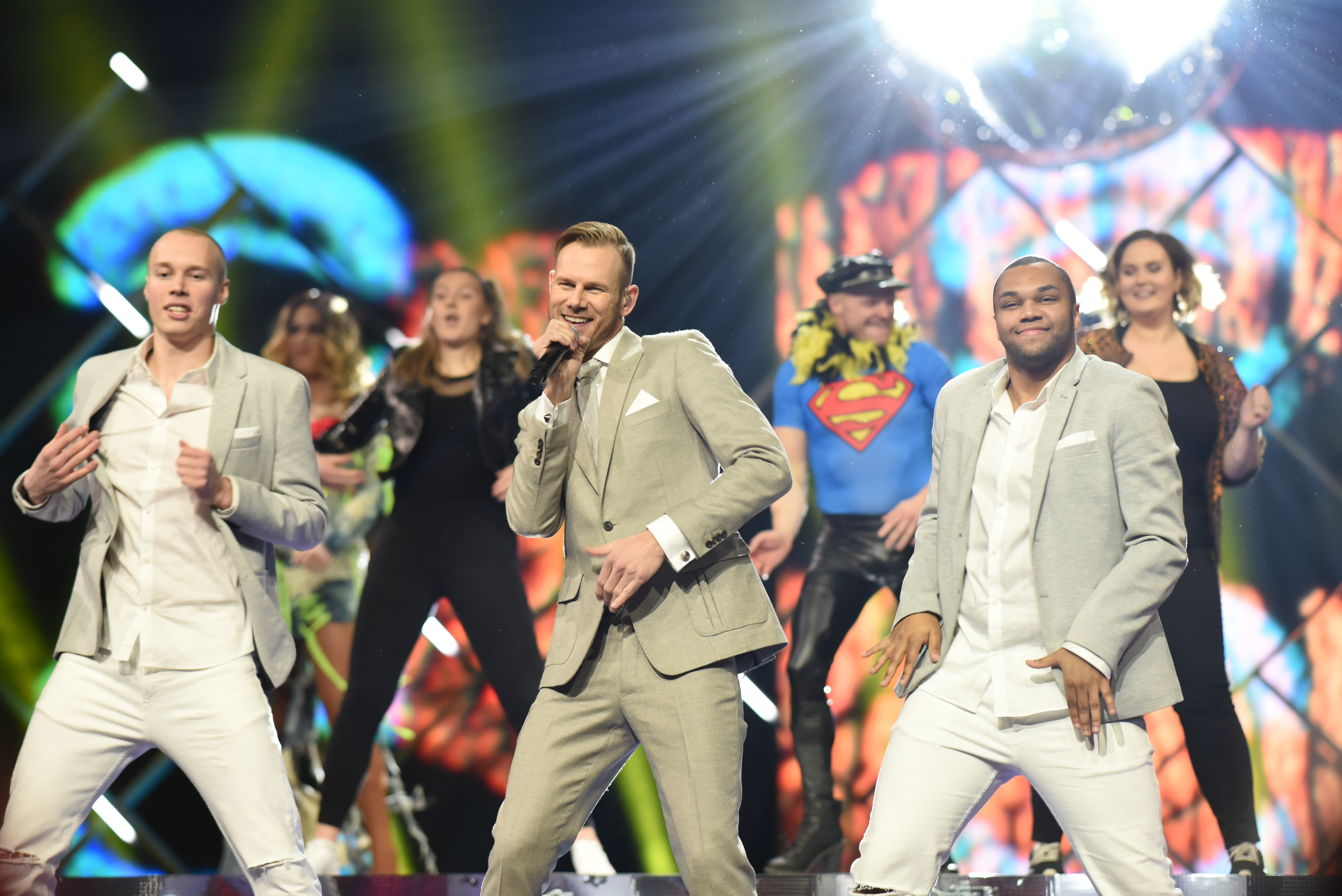
Hugo (center) performing at MGP 2018

In 2013, he participated for the first time in the Melodi Grand Prix with the song "Det er du" (It is You). However, he did not qualify for the Final. In 2018, he participated for the second time with the song "I Like I Like I Like". However, he did not qualify for the Gold Final. In 2019, he participated for the third time as part of the supergroup Keiino, who won and later represented Norway at Eurovision Song Contest 2019 with the song "Spirit in the Sky". He and Keiino would return again for Melodi Grand Prix 2021 with the song "Monument", placing second behind Tix and his song ''Fallen Angel''. Keiino took part in Melodi Grand Prix 2024 with the song "Damdiggida," placing second behind Gåte and their song "Ulveham".

He was announced as Norway's spokesperson for the 2025 Eurovision on 14 May.

=== Radiojam ===
As well as being an artist and songwriter, Hugo is one of the vocalists in the Norwegian band Radiojam.

=== Songwriting ===
Tom Hugo has co-written songs for artists in Europe and Asia. In Japan, Korean supergroup TVXQ released "Very Merry Xmas" on 27 November 2013, a song co-written by Tom and Chris Busek. In summer 2013, Hugo co-wrote the B-side "Sunny Day Hero" taken from SHINee's gold-selling maxi-single "Boys Meet U".

He has written 3 tracks together with Y'akoto for her album Baby Blues, released by Warner Bros. Germany in 2012. The co-written single "Without You" did fairly well on radio. The album peaked at #20 in Germany, and was nominated for an Echo award in 2013. Together with Finnish songwriter Erik Nyholm, he wrote the single "Hard to Love You" performed by [Sebastian Wurth] which was released in 2011. The single peaked at #18 on the German charts. In 2010, Meg Pfeiffer recorded "Love is Easy" co-written by Tom Hugo, Tebey and Sebastian Kirchner for her album Bullrider (#63 on German charts). Hugo was until recently signed by Universal Music Publishing in Germany.

== Personal life ==
Hugo is openly gay. He married his partner, Alexander Nyborg Olsson, on 4 December 2018. The pair wrote "Spirit In The Sky" together, alongside Keiino's other members.

== Discography ==
=== Studio albums ===
Title	Details	Peak chart positions
Title	Details	NOR
Sundry Tales	Released: 13 January 2012; Label: Kamè, Hugoworld; Format: Physical, digital download, streaming	23
Eden	Released: 17 November 2023; Label: Mii AS; Format: Physical, digital download, streaming	—
"—" denotes an album that did not chart or was not released in that territory.

=== Extended plays ===
Title	Details
I Apologise	Released: 4 December 2009; Label: No Limits; Format: Physical, digital download, streaming

=== Singles ===
==== As lead artist ====
Title	Year	Album or EP
"Open Up Your Eyes"	2011	Sundry Tales
"Det er du"	2013	Non-album singles
"It Is You"	2013	Non-album singles
"Nothing But the Best"	2014	Non-album singles
"Hjertet tar'kke feil"	2015	Non-album singles
"Better Than Me"	2017	Non-album singles
"Without U" (featuring Polina Vita)	2017	Non-album singles
"Huske å gå hjem" (with Radiojam)	2017	Non-album singles
"I Like I Like I Like"	2018	Non-album singles
"Family"	2018	Non-album singles
"Stolt"	2021	Non-album singles
"I Was a Fool" (with Alexandra Rotan)	2021	Eden
"Stuck in the Middle of Nowhere"	2023	Eden
"Royal"	2023	Eden
"Fade Out"	2023	Eden

==== Other appearances ====
Title	Year	Album or EP
"Kom ut kom fram" (with Lov)	2015	Nære deg - Sanger av Finn Kalvik
