= Spirit in the Sky (Keiino song) =

2019 song by Keiino

Single by Keiino

from the album OKTA
- Released: 25 January 2019
- Recorded: 2018
- Genre: Dance-pop; electropop; yoik; Sámi folk
- Length: 3:05
- Label: Self-publishing
- Songwriter(s): Tom Hugo Hermansen; Fred-René Buljo; Alexandra Rotan; Henrik Tala; Rüdiger Schramm; Alexander Olsson; Alexander N Olsson

Keiino singles chronology
"Spirit in the Sky" (2019)	"Shallow" (2019)

Music video
- "Spirit in the Sky" on YouTube

Eurovision Song Contest 2019 entry
- Country: Norway
- Artist(s): Keiino
- Languages: English; Northern Sámi
- Composer(s): Tom Hugo Hermansen; Henrik Tala; Fred-René Buljo; Rüdiger Schramm
- Lyricist(s): Alexander Olsson; Tom Hugo Hermansen; Fred-René Buljo; Alexandra Rotan; Alexander N Olsson

Finals performance
- Semi-final result: 7th
- Semi-final points: 210
- Final result: 6th
- Final points: 331

Entry chronology
- ◄ "That's How You Write a Song" (2018)
- "Attention" (2020) ►

"Spirit in the Sky" is a song by Norwegian music group Keiino. It was released as a digital download and for streaming on 25 January 2019 as the lead single from their debut studio album Okta. It represented Norway in the Eurovision Song Contest 2019 in Tel Aviv, Israel. It was performed during the second semi-final on 16 May 2019, and qualified for the final. It placed first in the televote with 291 points and finished in sixth place with 331 points overall.

== Background ==
The song is an uptempo number, inspired by 80s disco and dance music, which has been described as dance-pop, electropop, yoik, and Sami folk music. It is about the struggles for equal rights regardless of ethnicity, gender identity and sexuality, given their long struggle in pursuit of equal rights. The music video of "Spirit in the Sky" was released on 4 April 2019.

It contains some lyrics in the Northern Sami language, Čájet dan čuovgga ("Show me the light") and the non-lexical vocables, He lå e loi la as part of the yoiking segment.

== Eurovision Song Contest ==
The song was selected to represent Norway in the Eurovision Song Contest 2019, after Keiino were chosen through Melodi Grand Prix 2019, the music competition that selects Norway's entries for the Eurovision Song Contest. On 28 January 2019, a special allocation draw was held which placed each country into one of the two semi-finals, as well as which half of the show they would perform in. Norway was placed into the second semi-final, to be held on 16 May 2019, and was scheduled to perform in the second half of the show. After all the competing songs for the 2019 contest had been released, the running order for the semi-finals was decided by the show's producers rather than through another draw, so that similar songs were not placed next to each other. Norway performed in position 15, and qualified for the final, which took place on 18 May 2019. It placed first in the televote with 291 points and overall finished in sixth place with 331 points.

== Charts ==
Chart (2019)	Peak position
Austria (Ö3 Austria Top 40)	61
Estonia (Eesti Tipp-40)	11
Euro Digital Songs (Billboard)	5
Belgium (Ultratip Bubbling Under Flanders)	19
Greece International Digital Singles (IFPI)	53
Iceland (Tónlistinn)	11
Ireland (IRMA)	84
Lithuania (AGATA)	12
Netherlands (Single Top 100)	59
Norway (VG-lista)	1
Scotland (OCC)	7
Sweden (Sverigetopplistan)	33
Switzerland (Schweizer Hitparade)	7
UK Singles (OCC)	61
UK Dance (OCC)	9
UK Indie (OCC)	7

== Certifications ==
Region	Certification	Certified units/sales
Norway (IFPI Norway)	3× Platinum	180,000^{‡}
^{‡} Sales+streaming figures based on certification alone.

== See also ==
- "Sámiid ædnan" by Sverre Kjelsberg and Mattis Hætta. Another song containing joik representing Norway at the Eurovision Song Contest 1980.
