= Alexandra Rotan =

Norwegian singer

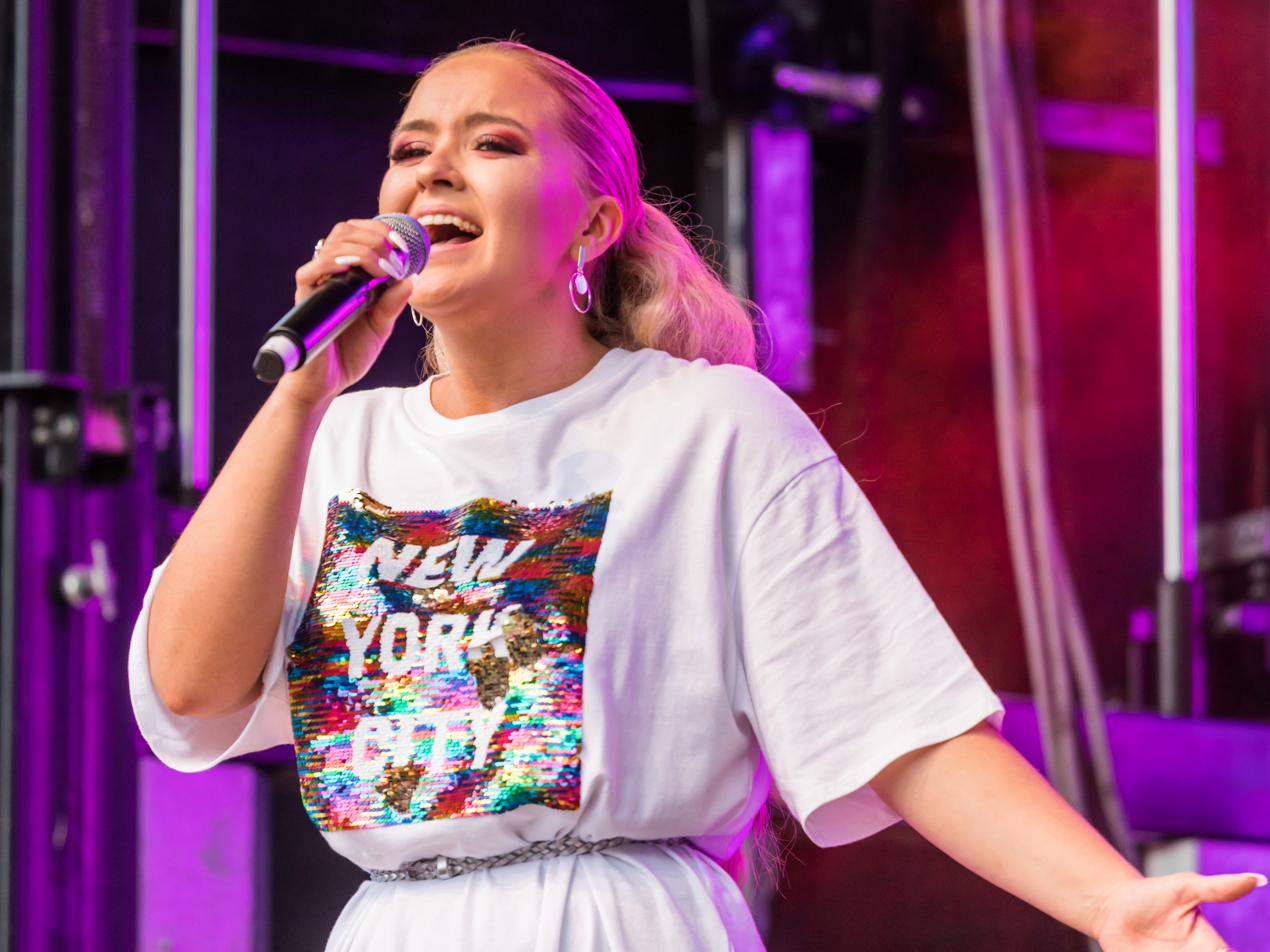
- Rotan at Cologne Pride in 2019

Background information
- Born: Alexandra Rotan; 29 June 1996 (age 30); Råholt, Eidsvoll, Norway
- Genres: Dance-pop; R&B; house
- Occupations: Singer; songwriter
- Instruments: Vocals; guitar
- Years active: 2010–present
- Member of: Keiino
- Website: keiino.com

Alexandra Rotan (born 29 June 1996) is a Norwegian singer. Rotan began her career as a child singer, becoming a superfinalist in Melodi Grand Prix Junior 2010 with the song "Det vi vil". She later joined the supergroup KEiiNO in 2018, and as part of the group represented Norway in the Eurovision Song Contest 2019 with the song "Spirit in the Sky", placing sixth. She had previously competed in Melodi Grand Prix 2018 in a duet with Stella Mwangi, placing third.

== Biography ==
Rotan competed in MGPjr 2010 with the song "Det vi vil" ("What we want"), where she reached the superfinal, and in Melodi Grand Prix 2018 along with Stella Mwangi performing the song "You Got Me", which came third.

Rotan competed on Norwegian Idol in 2016, which was broadcast on TV 2, but she was eliminated in the semifinal rounds. In 2017, Rotan joined Alan Walker on his European tour.

Rotan represented Norway in the Eurovision Song Contest 2019 as part of the group Keiino with the song "Spirit in the Sky".

In 2022, during a tour of Australia with Keiino, Rotan was admitted to hospital due to an infected koala scratch.

Rotan is a lyric coloratura soprano. In 2025, she played Glinda in the Norwegian production of the musical Wicked.

== Discography ==
=== As lead artist ===
Title	Year	Album or EP
"Hawaii" (with Chris Baco and Vliet)	2017	Non-album singles
"You Got Me" (with Stella Mwangi)	2018	Non-album singles
"F.I.L." (with Stella Mwangi)	2018	Non-album singles
"Crazy 'Bout U"	2018	Non-album singles
"Viva la Vida"	2021	Non-album singles
"Ikke som de andre"	2021	Non-album singles
"I Was a Fool" (with Tom Hugo)	2021	Eden
"O helga natt"	2021	Non-album singles
"Alt for Norge"	2022	Non-album singles
"Når himmelen faller ned"	2022	Non-album singles
"Stå i det"	2023	Non-album singles
"Stjernesludd"	2023	Non-album singles
"Jula er her"	2024	Non-album singles

=== As featured artist ===
Title	Year	Album or EP
"Need You" (Alphabeat featuring Alexandra Rotan)	2016	Non-album singles
"Fargene i meg" (Chris Baco featuring Alexandra Rotan)	2016	Non-album singles
"Crzy" (Marius featuring Alexandra Rotan)	2017	Non-album singles
"Last Song About You" (Kurt Nilsen featuring Alexandra Rotan)	2023	If Love Was a Song
"Tränen lügen nicht" (Michael Holm featuring Alexandra Rotan, Ramon Roselly, Mickie Krause, and Der Grosse Deutsche Schlagerchor)	2023	Holm 80
"Wart auf mich" (Michael Holm featuring Alexandra Rotan	2023	Holm 80

=== Other appearances ===
Title	Year	Album or EP
"We're in This Together"	2020	Non-album single
