= ColognePride =

Annual LGBT event in Cologne, Germany

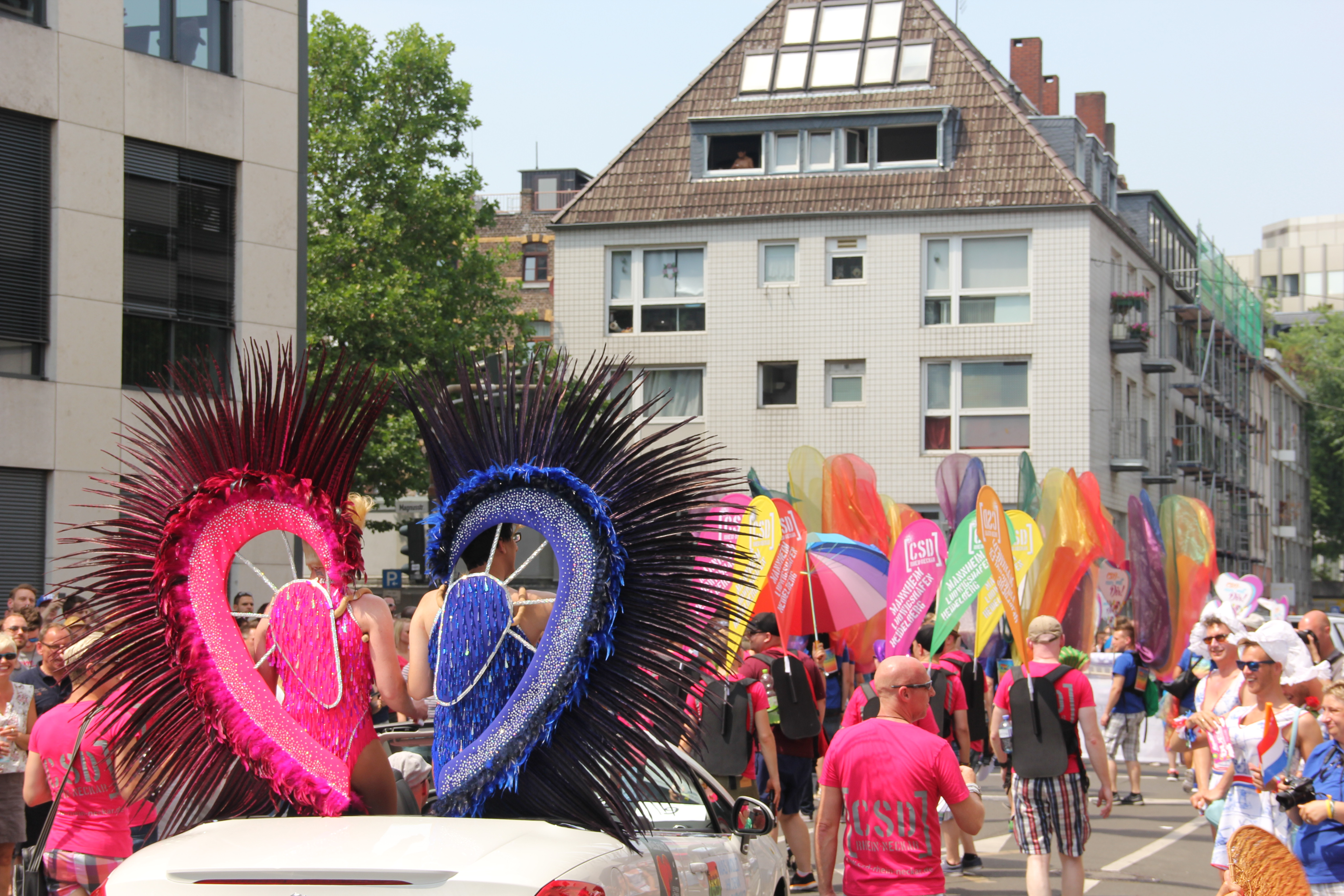
ColognePride, 2015

ColognePride or Cologne Gay Pride, formerly known as Christopher Street Day Cologne, is one of the largest gay and lesbian events organised in Germany and one of the biggest in Europe. Its origin is to celebrate the pride in Gay and Lesbian Culture.

Cologne Gay Pride is made of a large city gay pride parade, and a week of a number of festivals, parties and political forums. The parade and festivals are comparable to carnival celebrations and the political motivation of the event did achieve a lot in equal rights and gay rights.

Cologne Gay Pride takes place annually in Cologne, Germany.

== History ==
Cologne Gay Pride started during the 1980s as a small Christopher Street Day named for the Stonewall riots on Christopher Street in New York City. Within a liberal political culture in former West Germany the Christopher Street Day grew into one of the biggest celebration events in Germany. Education and support for AIDS became an important aspect during recent years. In 2002, ColognePride was also a joint European event as part of Europride].

In July 2001, there were 35,000 participants and 750,000 visitors.

In July 2014, there were 700,000 visitors.

Pictures from past events

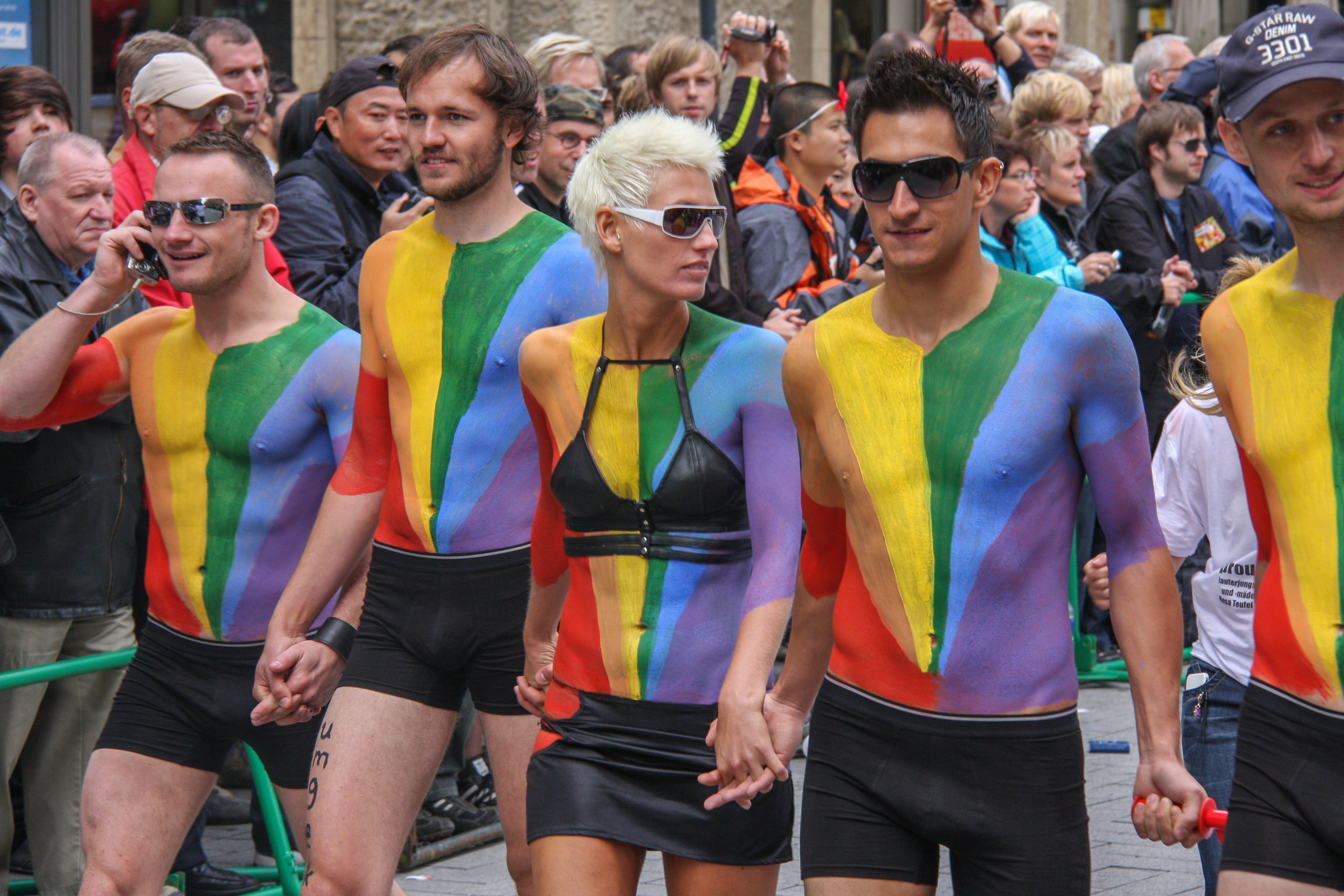
ColognePride 2011

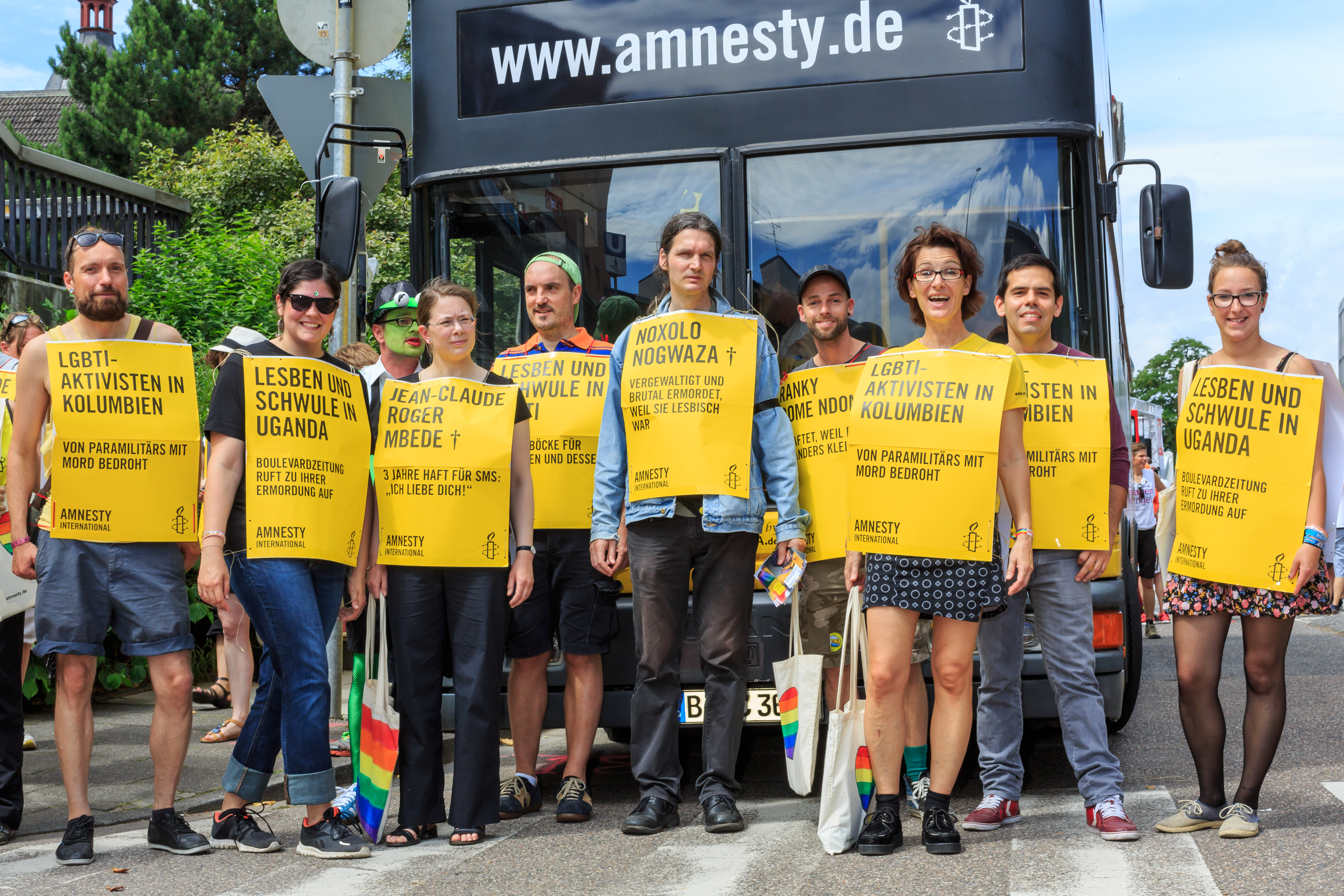
ColognePride 2014

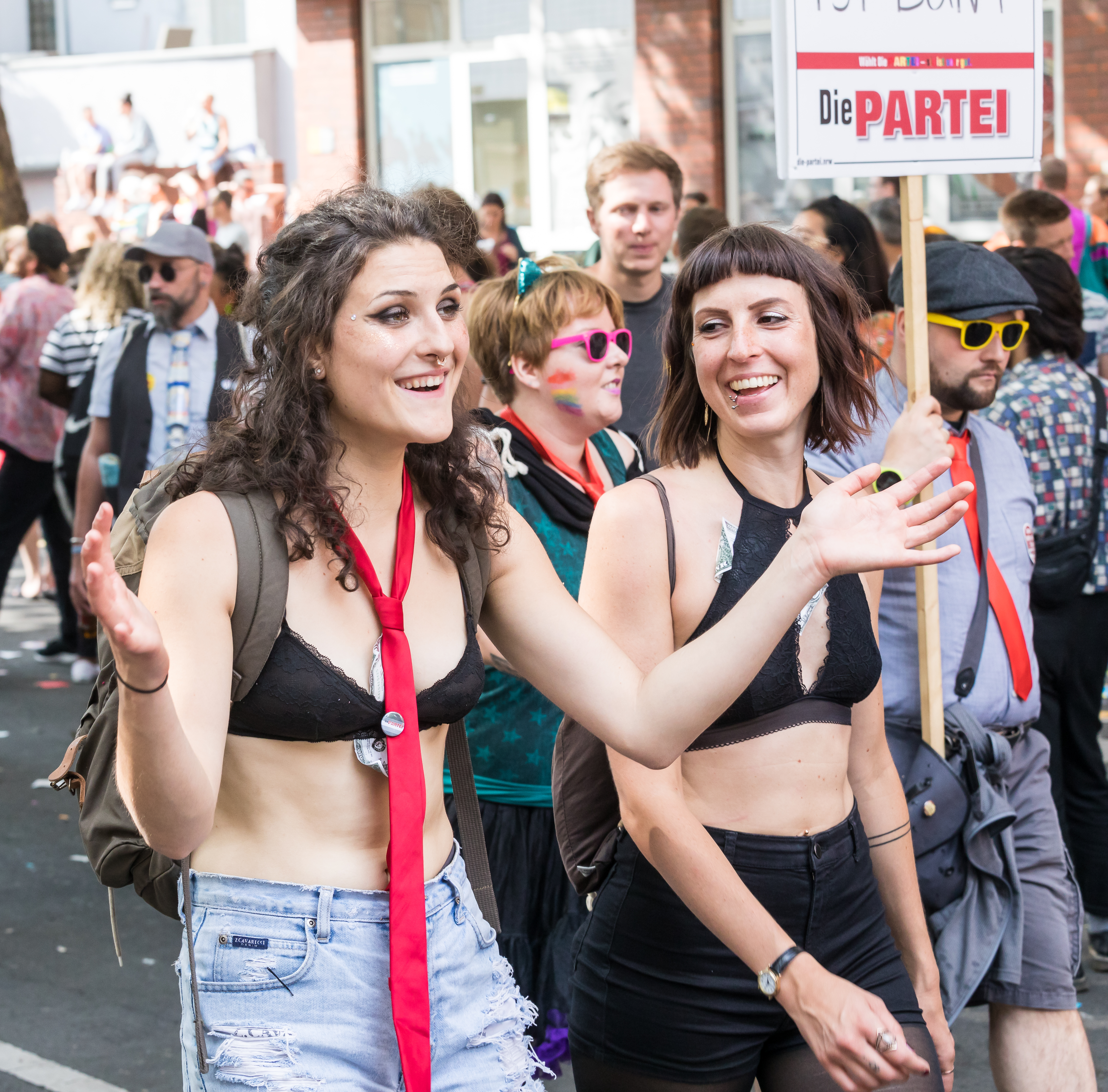
ColognePride 2019

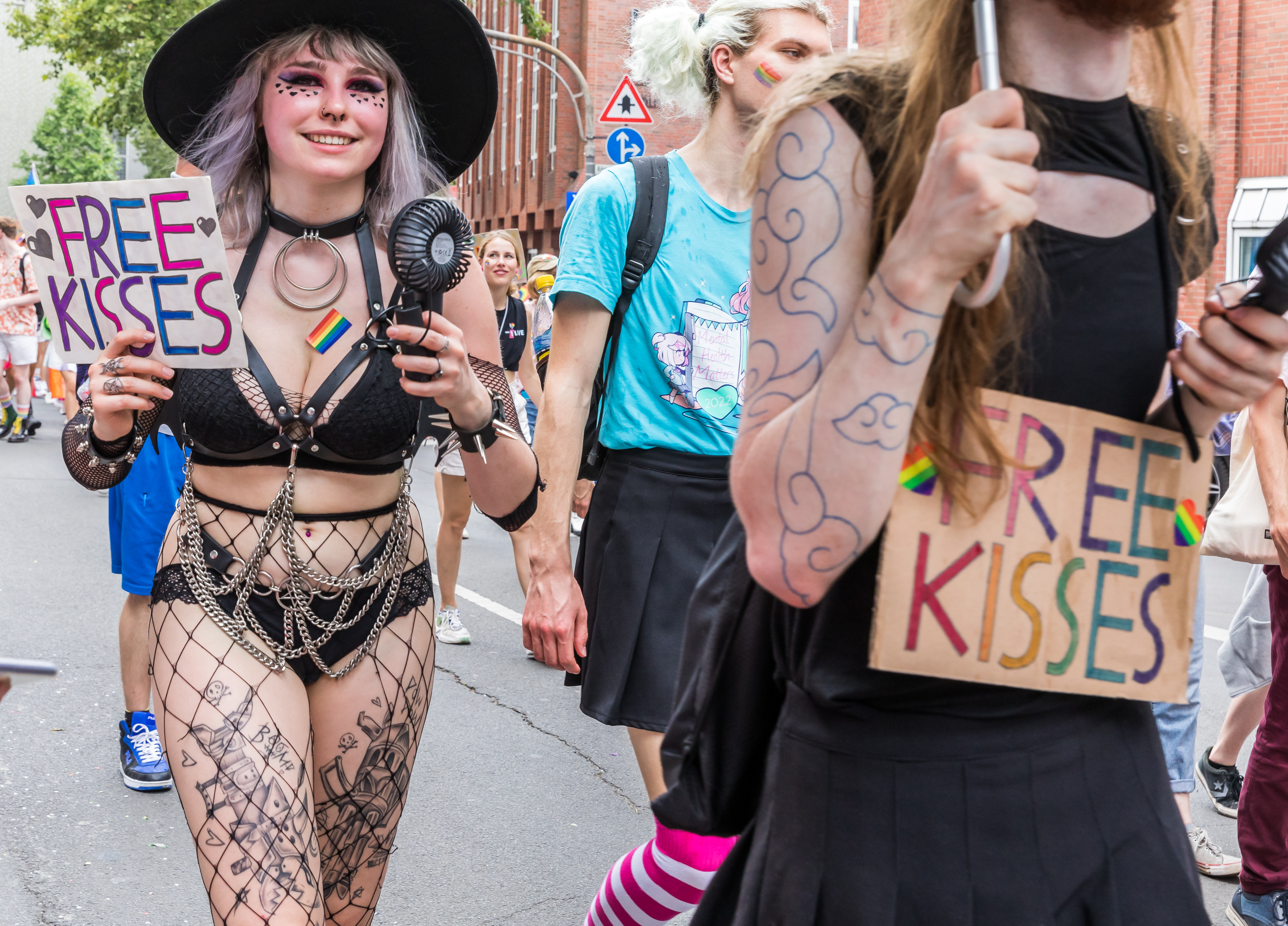
ColognePride 2023

=== Mottoes and Attendance at ColognePride ===
Year	Name	Motto (Original German)	Participants	Visitors (according to organisers)
2023	ColognePride	Für Menschenrechte - Viele. Gemeinsam. Stark!	60,000	1,400,000
2022	ColognePride	Für Menschenrechte - Viele. Gemeinsam. Stark!		1,200,000
2020	ColognePride	Für Menschenrechte - Viele. Gemeinsam. Stark!	2,000	Unknown
2019	ColognePride	50 YEARS OF PRIDE - Viele. Gemeinsam. Stark	30,000	1,200.000 to 1,300,000
2018	ColognePride	Coming out in deinem style	48,000	1,200,000
2017	ColognePride	Nie wieder!	30,000	950,000
2016	ColognePride	“anders.Leben!”		950,000
2015	ColognePride	Vielfalt: lehren, lernen, leben	20,000	950,000
2014	ColognePride	Wir sind „nur“ der rosa Karneval		700,000 to 800,000 (Police data: Frank Hilbricht, Central Police Station and Media)
2013	ColognePride	Wir sind. So oder so.		900,000 to 1,000.000
2012	CSD	Ja, ich will!	25,000	550.000–600.000
2011	ColognePride	Liebe ist …	20,000	900.000
2010	ColognePride	Stolz bewegt	10,000	900.000 oder 800.000 bis 1 Mill.
2009	ColognePride	Unsere Freiheit hat Geschichte – 40 Jahre CSD	30,000	
2008	ColognePride	Null Toleranz – für Null Toleranz	20,000	
2007	ColognePride	homo europaeicus: geht aufrecht!	20,000	
2006	ColognePride	100 % NRW NUR MIT UNS	30,000	600,000
2005	ColognePride	lebenslang liebens:würdig	20,000	600,000
2004	ColognePride	Schluss mit den Mogelpackungen	30,000	800,000
2003	CSD Köln / ColognePride	Liebe deine Nächsten: Antidiskriminierungsgesetz jetzt!	40,000	750,000
2002	Europride	Cologne celebrates diversity let’s make Europe a place for all of us!	50,000	1,200,000
2001	CSD in Köln	Im Namen des Volkes: Traut Euch!	35,000	750,000
2000	CSD in Köln	Taten statt Worte		
1999	CSD in Köln	30 Jahre Christopher-Street-Day: Vielfalt in den Lebensformen, Gleichheit in den Rechten, JETZT!		
1998	Christopher Street Day in Köln	Ob „Freie Fahrt für Homoehe“ oder keine entscheiden wir alleine!		
1997	Christopher Street Day Köln und 18. ILGA Weltkonferenz	FLAGGE ZEIGEN		
1996	Christopher Street Day ’96 in Köln	FLAGGE ZEIGEN		
1995	Christopher Street Day	FLAGGE ZEIGEN – Lesben und Schwule stark in Köln!		
1994		FLAGGE ZEIGEN – 25 Jahre Christopher-Street-Day		
1993	CSD – Christopher-Street-Day	Wir in Köln – wir halten zusammen!		
1992	Kölner Lesben & Schwulentag ’92	Mir fiere uns + Kölle		
1991	Cologne Lesbian/Gay Freedom Day And Celebration ’91; Kölner Lesben- und Schwulentag ’91	Jot Fründe kumme zosamme		

Pictures from past events (2000-2009)

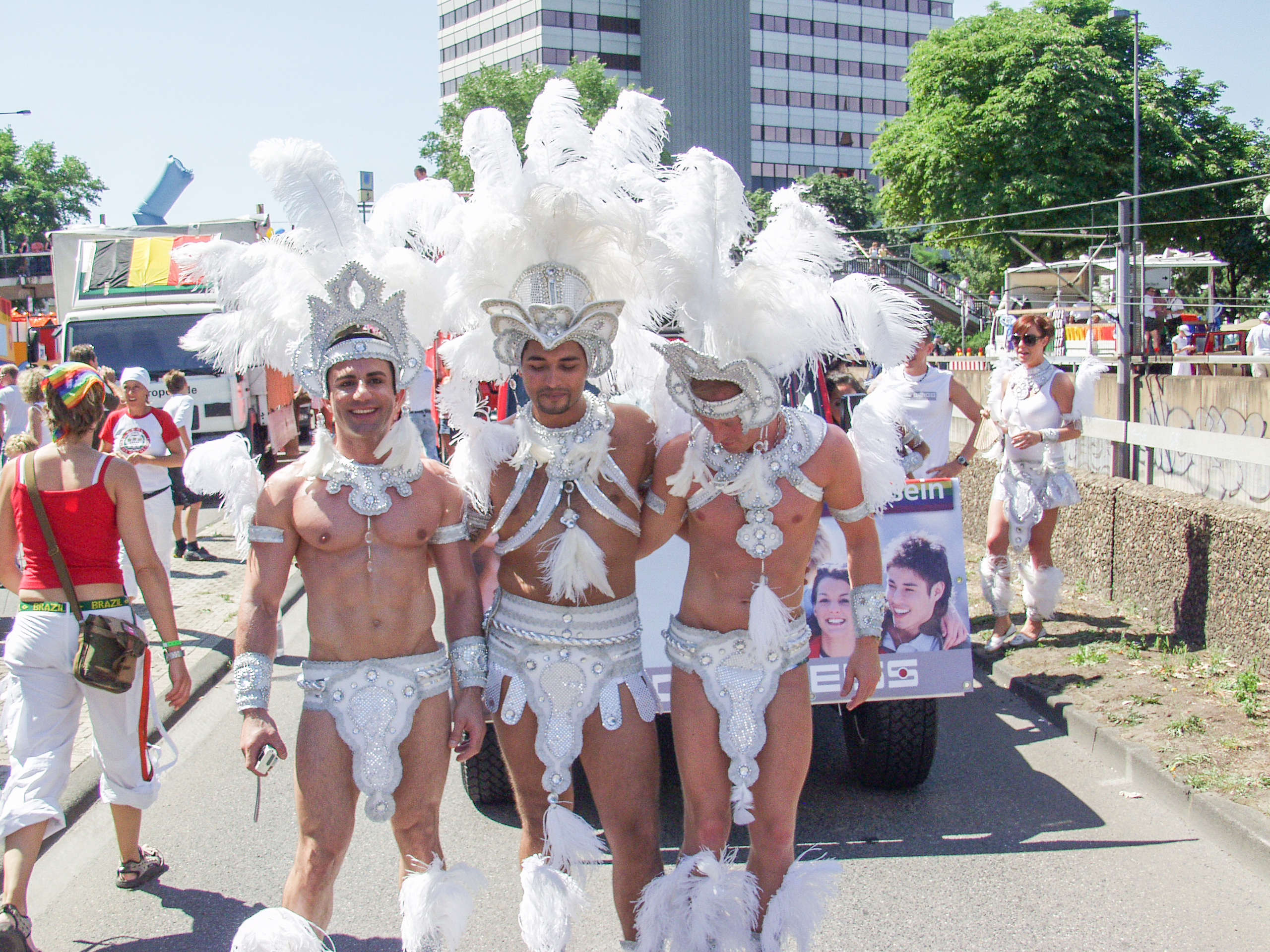
ColognePride 2006

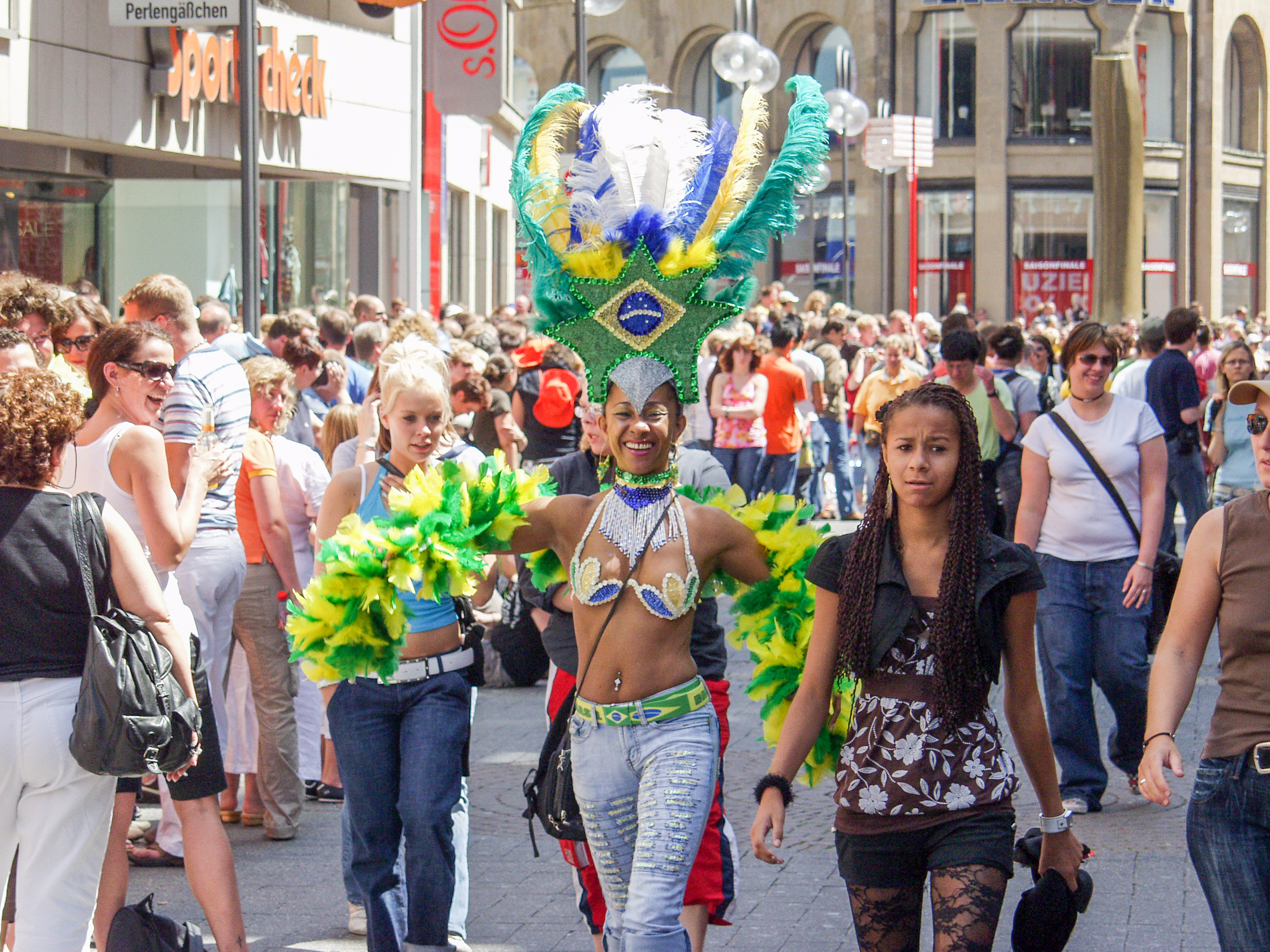
ColognePride 2007

== See also ==
- LGBT rights in Germany
