= Denmark in the Eurovision Song Contest 2022 =

- Eurovision Song Contest 2022
- Country: Denmark
- Selection process: Dansk Melodi Grand Prix 2022
- Selection date: 5 March 2022

Competing entry
- Song: "The Show"
- Artist: Reddi
- Songwriters: Chief 1 Ihan Haydar; Julia Fabrin; Remee Jackman; Siggy Savery

Placement
- Semi-final result: Failed to qualify (13th)

Participation chronology

Denmark was represented at the Eurovision Song Contest 2022 with the song "The Show" performed by the band Reddi. The Danish broadcaster DR organised the national final Dansk Melodi Grand Prix 2022 in order to select the Danish entry. Eight songs competed in a televised show where "The Show" performed by Reddi was the winner as decided upon through two rounds of public voting.

Denmark was drawn to compete in the first semi-final of the Eurovision Song Contest which took place on 10 May 2022. Performing during the show in position 12, "The Show" was not announced among the top 10 entries of the first semi-final and therefore did not qualify to compete in the final. It was later revealed that Denmark placed thirteenth out of the 17 participating countries in the semi-final with 55 points.

== Background ==
Prior to the 2022 contest, Denmark had participated in the Eurovision Song Contest forty-nine times since their first entry in 1957. Denmark had won the contest, to this point, on three occasions: in 1963 with the song "Dansevise" performed by Grethe and Jørgen Ingmann, in 2000 with the song "Fly on the Wings of Love" performed by Olsen Brothers, and in 2013 with the song "Only Teardrops" performed by Emmelie de Forest. In the 2021 contest, "Øve os på hinanden" performed by Fyr og Flamme failed to qualify Denmark to the final; the last time the nation had failed to qualify to the final was in 2016.

The Danish national broadcaster, DR, broadcasts the event within Denmark and organises the selection process for the nation's entry. DR confirmed their intentions to participate at the 2022 Eurovision Song Contest on 1 July 2021. Denmark has selected all of their Eurovision entries thus far through the national final Dansk Melodi Grand Prix. On 27 August 2021, the broadcaster announced that Dansk Melodi Grand Prix 2022 would be organised in order to select Denmark's entry for the 2022 contest.

== Before Eurovision ==
=== Dansk Melodi Grand Prix 2022 ===
Dansk Melodi Grand Prix 2022 was the 52nd edition of Dansk Melodi Grand Prix, the music competition that selects Denmark's entries for the Eurovision Song Contest. The event was held on 5 March 2022 at the Jyske Bank Boxen in Herning, hosted by Tina Müller and Martin Brygmann. The show was televised on DR1 as well as streamed online at the broadcaster's streaming service DR TV and the official DR website. The national final was watched by 985,000 viewers in Denmark.

==== Format ====
Eight songs, all accompanied by the DR Grand Prix orchestra, competed in one show where the winner was determined over two rounds of public voting. In the first round, the top three songs qualified to the superfinal, during which the winner was determined. Viewers were able to vote via SMS or a mobile application specifically designed for the competition. Prior to the show, the public was provided with one free vote on the app to cast a vote each day between 28 February 2022 and 4 March 2022, while viewers using the app during the show were provided with two free votes.

==== Competing entries ====
DR opened a submission period between 27 August 2021 and 29 October 2021 for artists and composers to submit their entries. The broadcaster stated that the competition would seek out songs that "represent the quality and breadth of the Danish music scene" with emphasis on songs that "have the potential to represent Danish music and Danish culture in the most distinguished way at the Eurovision Song Contest". A six-member selection committee selected eight songs from the entries submitted to the broadcaster. The committee was composed of Lars Trillingsgaard (head of music strategy for DR), Lotte Friis (radio host on DR P4), Maria Fantino (radio host on DR P3), Andrew Jensen (radio host on DR P4), Mathias Buch Jensen (head of music of DR P3) and Bettina Skriver (producer of Dansk Melodi Grand Prix). The competing artists and songs were officially presented on 10 February 2022 during the DR radio programmes P3 Buffeten, Formiddag på 4'eren, P4 Play and Det gode selskab på P5.

Artist	Song	Songwriter(s)
Conf3ssions	"Hallelujah"	Jon Nørgaard, Moh Denebi, Nikolaj Pellegrini, Patrick Dalton, Rachel Furner
Der Var Engang	"En skønne dag"	Claus Reenberg, Emma Pi, Rasmus Hedeboe
Fuld Effekt	"Rave med de hårde drenge"	Alexander Scott Dyrbye, Claus Waldorff Thomsen, Kasper Bruhn Nielsen, Zachary Rune Dyrbye
Josie Elinor and Jack Warren	"Let Me Go"	Benjamin Rosenbohm, Julie Aagaard, Katrine Brixen, Mikkel Martinus Sørensen
Juncker	"Kommet for at blive"	Christian Juncker
Morten Fillipsen	"Happy Go Lucky"	Kasper Holm Larsen, Morten Fillipsen, Rasmus Rydahl
Patrick Dorgan	"Vinden suser ind"	Daniel Scheffmann, Jeppe Kronback, Ole Bjørn Heiring Albertsen, Patrick Dorgan
Reddi	"The Show"	Chief 1, Ihan Haydar, Julia Fabrin, Remee Jackman, Siggy Savery

==== Final ====
The final took place on 5 March 2022. The running order was determined by DR and announced on 20 February 2022. In the first round of voting the top three advanced to the superfinal based on the votes of a public vote. In the week leading up to the show, viewers could vote through the DR Grand Prix app. During the show, viewers could via through SMS and the app. In the first round of voting the top three advanced to the superfinal based on the votes of a public vote. The three songs with the most votes received pre-show were each awarded with 10% of the total votes, while the three songs with the most votes received through SMS and app voting were each awarded with 12% and 78% of the total votes, respectively. In the superfinal, the winner, "The Show" performed by Reddi, was selected solely by the public vote through SMS (24%) and app voting (76%). In addition to the performances of the competing entries, the competition was opened by Danish Eurovision Song Contest 2021 representatives Fyr og Flamme.

Final – 5 March 2022
R/O	Artist	Song	Public Vote			Total	Result
R/O	Artist	Song	Pre-show	SMS	App	Total	Result
1	Patrick Dorgan	"Vinden suser ind"	—	—	—	0%	—N/a
2	Conf3ssions	"Hallelujah"	10%	12%	78%	100%	Advanced
3	Der Var Engang	"En skønne dag"	—	—	—	0%	—N/a
4	Fuld Effekt	"Rave med de hårde drenge"	10%	12%	—	22%	—N/a
5	Josie Elinor and Jack Warren	"Let Me Go"	10%	—	78%	88%	Advanced
6	Morten Fillipsen	"Happy Go Lucky"	—	—	—	0%	—N/a
7	Reddi	"The Show"	—	12%	78%	90%	Advanced
8	Juncker	"Kommet for at blive"	—	—	—	0%	—N/a

Superfinal – 5 March 2022
R/O	Artist	Song	Public Vote			Place
R/O	Artist	Song	SMS	App	Total	Place
1	Conf3ssions	"Hallelujah"	6%	26%	32%	2
2	Reddi	"The Show"	9%	28%	37%	1
3	Josie Elinor and Jack Warren	"Let Me Go"	9%	22%	31%	3

== At Eurovision ==
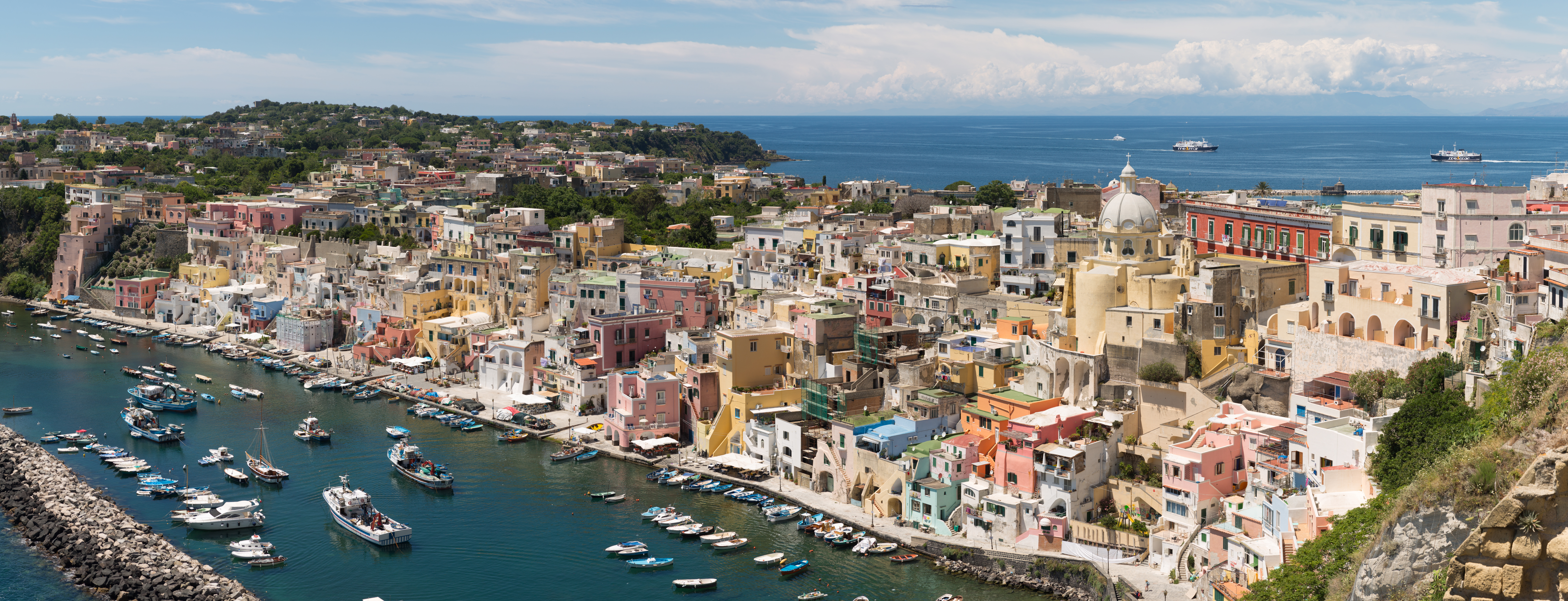
A video postcard introduced Denmark's performance in the first semi-final of the Eurovision Song Contest 2022. The postcard was filmed in the Italian town of Procida in the Province of Naples and featured virtual projections of the band across the location.

According to Eurovision rules, all nations with the exceptions of the host country and the "Big Five" (France, Germany, Italy, Spain, and the United Kingdom) are required to qualify from one of two semi-finals in order to compete for the final; the top ten countries from each semi-final progress to the final. The European Broadcasting Union (EBU) split up the competing countries into six different pots based on voting patterns from previous contests, with countries with favorable voting histories put into the same pot. On 25 January 2022, an allocation draw was held which placed each country into one of the two semi-finals, as well as which half of the show they would perform in. Denmark was placed into the first semi-final, which was held on 10 May 2022, and was scheduled to perform in the second half of the show.

Once all the competing songs for the 2022 contest had been released, the running order for the semi-finals was decided by the shows' producers rather than through another draw, so that similar songs were not placed next to each other. Denmark was set to perform in position 12, following the entry from Croatia and before the entry from Austria.

The two semi-finals and final were broadcast on DR1 with commentary by Henrik Milling and Nicolai Molbech. The Danish spokesperson, who announced the top 12-point score awarded by the Danish jury during the final, was Tina Müller.

=== Semi-final ===
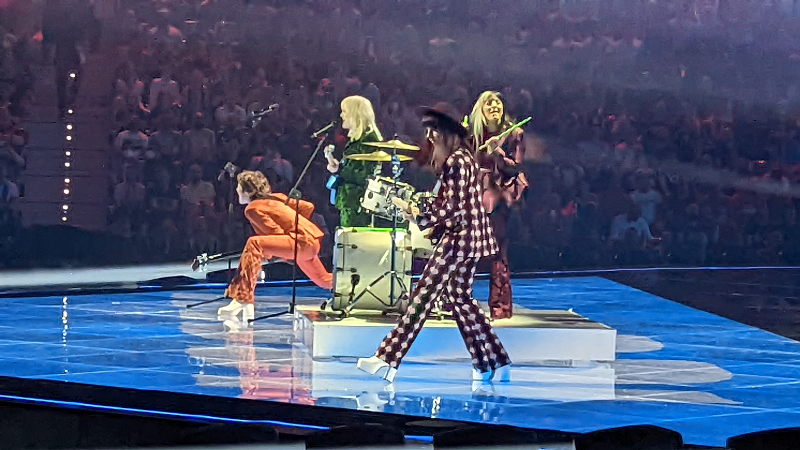
Reddi performing during the first semi-final

Reddi took part in technical rehearsals on 1 and 5 May, followed by dress rehearsals on 9 and 10 May. This included the jury show on 9 May where the professional juries of each country watched and voted on the competing entries.

The Danish performance featured the members of Reddi dressed in colourful retro-inspired outfits and performing in a band set-up. The performance began with lead singer Mathilde Savery at the piano before joining the other members as the song progressed. The stage colours were predominantly yellow, red, blue and green and the LED screens displayed the band name. The performance also featured the use of pyrotechnics.

At the end of the show, Denmark was not announced among the top 10 entries in the first semi-final and therefore failed to qualify to compete in the final. It was later revealed that Denmark placed thirteenth in the semi-final, receiving a total of 55 points: 20 points from the televoting and 35 points from the juries.

=== Voting ===
Below is a breakdown of points awarded to Denmark during the first semi-final. Voting during the three shows involved each country awarding two sets of points from 1-8, 10 and 12: one from their professional jury and the other from televoting. The exact composition of the professional jury, and the results of each country's jury and televoting were released after the final; the individual results from each jury member were also released in an anonymised form. The Danish jury consisted of DJ Speakr, Jonas Flodager Rasmussen, who represented Denmark in the Eurovision Song Contest 2018, Kirstine Stubbe Teglbjærg, Lars Trillingsgaard, and Mekdes. In the first semi-final, Denmark finished in thirteenth place out of seventeen entries, marking the country's second consecutive non-qualification from the semi-finals. Over the course of the contest, Denmark awarded its 12 points to Netherlands (jury) and Ukraine (televote) in the first semi-final and to Greece (jury) and Ukraine (televote) in the final.

==== Points awarded to Denmark ====
Points awarded to Denmark (Semi-final 1)
Score	Televote	Jury
12 points		
10 points		
8 points		
7 points		
6 points	Iceland	Latvia
5 points		Austria; Lithuania; Switzerland; Ukraine
4 points	Norway	
3 points	Moldova; Portugal	Croatia; Norway
2 points	Latvia	Bulgaria
1 point	Lithuania; Slovenia	Iceland

==== Points awarded by Denmark ====
Points awarded by Denmark (Semi-final 1)
Score	Televote	Jury
12 points	Ukraine	Netherlands
10 points	Norway	Greece
8 points	Lithuania	Portugal
7 points	Iceland	Ukraine
6 points	Moldova	Switzerland
5 points	Armenia	Lithuania
4 points	Netherlands	Iceland
3 points	Portugal	Norway
2 points	Austria	Armenia
1 point	Switzerland	Latvia

Points awarded by Denmark (Final)
Score	Televote	Jury
12 points	Ukraine	Greece
10 points	Sweden	Netherlands
8 points	Norway	Portugal
7 points	Lithuania	Sweden
6 points	United Kingdom	United Kingdom
5 points	Moldova	Ukraine
4 points	Poland	Spain
3 points	Estonia	Lithuania
2 points	Iceland	Switzerland
1 point	Spain	Iceland

==== Detailed voting results ====
The following members comprised the Danish jury:

- DJ Speakr – music producer, DJ and member of Fuld Effekt
- Jonas Flodager Rasmussen – singer, actor, represented Denmark in the Eurovision Song Contest 2018
- Kirstine Stubbe Teglbjærg – composer, songwriter, producer
- Lars Trillingsgaard – jury chairman, music expert
- Mekdes – singer-songwriter

Detailed voting results from Denmark (Semi-final 1)
R/O	Country	Jury							Televote	
R/O	Country	Juror A	Juror B	Juror C	Juror D	Juror E	Rank	Points	Rank	Points
01	Albania	15	16	15	16	10	16		15	
02	Latvia	4	15	13	14	12	10	1	12	
03	Lithuania	11	2	10	10	4	6	5	3	8
04	Switzerland	9	3	4	4	5	5	6	10	1
05	Slovenia	16	14	7	15	15	14		16	
06	Ukraine	1	7	3	7	8	4	7	1	12
07	Bulgaria	14	13	14	9	13	15		14	
08	Netherlands	7	1	1	2	3	1	12	7	4
09	Moldova	12	4	16	13	16	11		5	6
10	Portugal	5	11	2	1	2	3	8	8	3
11	Croatia	8	12	9	12	11	12		13	
12	Denmark									
13	Austria	10	10	8	11	14	13		9	2
14	Iceland	6	5	6	8	7	7	4	4	7
15	Greece	2	6	5	3	1	2	10	11	
16	Norway	3	9	12	6	9	8	3	2	10
17	Armenia	13	8	11	5	6	9	2	6	5

Detailed voting results from Denmark (Final)
R/O	Country	Jury							Televote	
R/O	Country	Juror 1	Juror 2	Juror 3	Juror 4	Juror 5	Rank	Points	Rank	Points
01	Czech Republic	13	9	22	15	20	18		24	
02	Romania	14	10	24	16	18	20		15	
03	Portugal	7	12	4	1	1	3	8	14	
04	Finland	19	23	17	18	21	24		13	
05	Switzerland	21	8	9	3	8	9	2	16	
06	France	22	18	16	20	24	25		22	
07	Norway	8	19	13	8	13	12		3	8
08	Armenia	15	6	20	17	14	14		19	
09	Italy	17	22	5	19	5	11		18	
10	Spain	2	21	3	21	12	7	4	10	1
11	Netherlands	5	3	7	2	2	2	10	12	
12	Ukraine	1	13	10	5	10	6	5	1	12
13	Germany	25	20	23	13	15	23		20	
14	Lithuania	4	5	8	22	9	8	3	4	7
15	Azerbaijan	16	24	15	14	7	15		25	
16	Belgium	23	17	18	7	17	16		23	
17	Greece	3	2	6	4	3	1	12	21	
18	Iceland	11	7	19	6	11	10	1	9	2
19	Moldova	20	4	25	25	25	13		6	5
20	Sweden	12	1	1	11	6	4	7	2	10
21	Australia	10	25	11	23	19	19		17	
22	United Kingdom	6	11	2	9	4	5	6	5	6
23	Poland	24	16	14	12	16	22		7	4
24	Serbia	9	15	21	24	22	21		11	
25	Estonia	18	14	12	10	23	17		8	3
