= Denmark in the Eurovision Song Contest =

- Eurovision Song Contest
- Participating broadcaster: Danish Broadcasting Corporation (DR)

Participation summary
- Appearances: 54 (46 finals)
- First appearance: 1957
- Highest placement: 1st: 1963, 2000, 2013
- Host: 1964, 2001, 2014
- Participation history: 1957; 1958; 1959; 1960; 1961; 1962; 1963; 1964; 1965; 1966; 1967 – 1977; 1978; 1979; 1980; 1981; 1982; 1983; 1984; 1985; 1986; 1987; 1988; 1989; 1990; 1991; 1992; 1993; 1994; 1995; ~~1996~~; 1997; 1998; 1999; 2000; 2001; 2002; 2003; 2004; 2005; 2006; 2007; 2008; 2009; 2010; 2011; 2012; 2013; 2014; 2015; 2016; 2017; 2018; 2019; ~~2020~~; 2021; 2022; 2023; 2024; 2025; 2026

Related articles
- Dansk Melodi Grand Prix

External links
- DR page
- Denmark's page at Eurovision.com
- For the most recent participation see Denmark in the Eurovision Song Contest 2026

Denmark has been represented at the Eurovision Song Contest 54 times, making its first appearance in 1957. Having competed in ten consecutive contests until 1966, Denmark was absent for eleven consecutive contests from 1967 to 1977. Since 1978, it has been absent from only four contests. Denmark has won the contest three times: in 1963, 2000 and 2013. The Danish participating broadcaster in the contest is the Danish Broadcasting Corporation (DR), which select its entrant with the national competition Dansk Melodi Grand Prix.

Denmark finished third on its debut in 1957 with Birthe Wilke and Gustav Winckler, before winning the contest for the first time in 1963 with the song "Dansevise" performed by Grethe and Jørgen Ingmann. The country returned to the top three 25 years later, with third-place finishes for Hot Eyes in 1988 and Birthe Kjær in 1989, while Denmark's only top five result of the 1990s was Aud Wilken's fifth place in 1995.

Denmark won the contest for the second time in 2000 with "Fly on the Wings of Love" performed by the Olsen Brothers. Denmark then finished second as hosts in 2001 with "Never Ever Let You Go" performed by Rollo and King, before Malene Mortensen became the first Danish entry to finish last in 2002. Denmark won the contest for the third time in 2013, with "Only Teardrops" performed by Emmelie de Forest. Denmark has placed in the top five 14 times.

== Participation ==
The Danish Broadcasting Corporation (DR) is a full member of the European Broadcasting Union (EBU), thus eligible to participate in the Eurovision Song Contest. It participated in the contest representing Denmark since its second edition in 1957. It had intended to compete at the first contest in 1956, but had submitted its application past the deadline and was, therefore, not allowed to compete. Denmark was the first Nordic country to take part in the contest, with Sweden, Norway, and Finland following soon after. Iceland, however, did not take part until 1986.

== History ==
=== Debut ===
Denmark's first participants were Birthe Wilke and Gustav Winckler, who sang the song "Skibet skal sejle i nat". Their performance was controversial as, at the end of the song, the couple performed an 11-second kiss, which caused outcry in some countries. Nevertheless, the performance achieved third place.

=== First victory ===
Denmark won the contest for the first time in 1963, when Grethe and Jørgen Ingmann sang "Dansevise". The victory, however, was controversial. When Norway announced its votes, the presenter Katie Boyle had to correct the spokesperson and said that she would call them again later. Viewers around Europe could then see the votes had been changed, changing the outcome of the contest and giving the victory to Denmark at the expense of Switzerland. In fact, the reason why Norway had to announce its votes again was that the Norwegian spokesperson did not follow the right procedure the first time and, therefore, there was doubt whether he gave the correct votes on the first occasion.

The final result was valid and the victory went to Denmark. Accordingly, in 1964, the contest was held in Denmark for the first time.

=== Absence and return ===
After the 1966 contest and a record low 14th place, Denmark withdrew from the contest, as DR's new head of entertainment Niels Jørgen Kaiser did not view the contest as being quality entertainment citing dissatisfaction from the viewers. Dansk Melodi Grand Prix was not held from that year onwards.

However, in the 1978 contest, after 11 years of absence, and following Niels Jørgen Kaisers departure from DR, Denmark returned to the contest, represented by Mabel and the song "Boom Boom".

=== 1980s ===
Denmark's most successful time at the contest came between 1984 and 1990, with the country reaching the top eight in six out of seven contests, including four top-five placings. The duo of Hot Eyes represented the nation three times during this period. In 1984, they sang the song "Det' lige det" and finished fourth. In 1985, they became the first and, as of 2020 only act to represent Denmark in two consecutive years. Singing "Sku' du spørg' fra no'en?", they could not repeat their success of the previous year and came 11th. In 1988, Hot Eyes represented Denmark again with "Ka' du se hva' jeg sa'?". The duo scored its best result to date, finishing in third place, losing only to Céline Dion and Scott Fitzgerald. Denmark's other good results during this time were sixth place for Lise Haavik in 1986, fifth for Anne-Cathrine Herdorf and Bandjo in 1987, third for Birthe Kjær in 1989 and eighth for Lonnie Devantier in 1990.

=== 1990s ===
After 1990, Denmark fell from its high positions of the 1980s and was relegated from the contest on three occasions in the 1990s. In 1993, Tommy Seebach, who had previously represented Denmark in 1979 and 1981, finished 22nd, resulting Denmark being relegated from the contest in 1994. Aud Wilken sang "Fra Mols til Skagen" for the nation at the 1995 contest and came 5th, but this high placing could not be repeated in 1996, as Denmark's entry, "Kun med dig" sung by Dorthe Andersen and Martin Loft, did not qualify from the pre-qualifying round of the contest. In 1998, Denmark was once again relegated from the contest following a poor result in 1997. In 1999, the abolition of the language rule, which had required all countries to sing in their official languages, brought a return to success for Denmark, when Michael Teschl and Trine Jepsen finished 8th with "This Time I Mean It".

=== 2000s and 2010s ===
In 2000, Denmark won the contest with brothers Jørgen and Niels Olsen defying the odds (they were considerably older than their competitors and only one male duo had won before), to win with "Fly on the Wings of Love". The song went on to enjoy huge success around Europe.

At the 2001 contest, held in Copenhagen, Rollo and King came second with the song "Never Ever Let You Go". However, in 2002, Malene Mortensen came 24th (last) with "Tell Me Who You Are", giving Denmark its worst result ever. Therefore, Denmark was relegated from the 2003 contest.

In 2005, Copenhagen hosted Congratulations: 50 Years of the Eurovision Song Contest, an event to commemorate the 50th anniversary.

Since the introduction of semifinals in 2004, Denmark has qualified for the final on ten out of 18 occasions. Another string of successful participations started in 2010, when Denmark reached the top five for the first time in nine years, finishing fourth with "In a Moment like This" performed by Chanée and N'evergreen. A year later, Denmark finished fifth with "New Tomorrow" performed by the band A Friend in London, and in 2013, Denmark won the contest for the third time, when Emmelie de Forest represented the country with the song "Only Teardrops", winning with Denmark's highest-ever score of 281 points.

In 2014, Denmark reached the top ten for the fourth time in five years, when Basim finished ninth. However, the success did not continue into 2015 and 2016, as Denmark failed to qualify for the final in those years. In 2017, the country returned to the final, finishing 20th with Anja Nissen. Denmark achieved its fifth top ten result of the decade in 2018, with Rasmussen and the song "Higher Ground" finishing ninth. In 2019, Leonora took Denmark to their 12th final with the song "Love Is Forever" and finished 12th in the final with 120 points.

=== 2020s ===
In 2021, the duo Fyr og Flamme with "Øve os på hinanden", Denmark's first entry fully in Danish since 1997, failed to qualify for the final, finishing 11th in the second semi-final with 89 points. Further non-qualifications followed with Reddi in 2022, Reiley in 2023 and Saba in 2024 before Sissal ended the streak in 2025, qualifying with "Hallucination", and Søren Torpegaard Lund qualifying and finishing seventh in the final in 2026 with "Før vi går hjem".

After hosting the contest in 2014, Denmark has only managed to qualify five times in 11 years (2017, 2018, 2019, 2025, 2026), after failing to qualify twice (in 2004 and 2007) since the introduction of semi-finals in 2004 up until 2014.

== Participation overview ==
Table key
1	First place
2	Second place
3	Third place
◁	Last place
◇	Entry selected but did not compete
†	Upcoming event

Year	Artist	Song	Language	Final	Points	Semi	Points
1957	Birthe Wilke and Gustav Winckler	"Skibet skal sejle i nat"	Danish	3	10	No semi-finals	
1958	Raquel Rastenni	"Jeg rev et blad ud af min dagbog"	Danish	8	3	No semi-finals	
1959	Birthe Wilke	"Uh, jeg ville ønske jeg var dig"	Danish	5	12	No semi-finals	
1960	Katy Bødtger	"Det var en yndig tid"	Danish	10	4	No semi-finals	
1961	Dario Campeotto	"Angelique"	Danish	5	12	No semi-finals	
1962	Ellen Winther	"Vuggevise"	Danish	10	2	No semi-finals	
1963	Grethe and Jørgen Ingmann	"Dansevise"	Danish	1	42	No semi-finals	
1964	Bjørn Tidmand	"Sangen om dig"	Danish	9	4	No semi-finals	
1965	Birgit Brüel	"For din skyld"	Danish	7	10	No semi-finals	
1966	Ulla Pia	"Stop – mens legen er go'"	Danish	14	4	No semi-finals	
1978	Mabel	"Boom Boom"	Danish	16	13	No semi-finals	
1979	Tommy Seebach	"Disco Tango"	Danish	6	76	No semi-finals	
1980	Bamses Venner	"Tænker altid på dig"	Danish	14	25	No semi-finals	
1981	Tommy Seebach and Debbie Cameron	"Krøller eller ej"	Danish	11	41	No semi-finals	
1982	Brixx	"Video-Video"	Danish	17	5	No semi-finals	
1983	Gry Johansen	"Kloden drejer"	Danish	17	16	No semi-finals	
1984	Hot Eyes	"Det' lige det"	Danish	4	101	No semi-finals	
1985	Hot Eyes	"Sku' du spørg' fra no'en"	Danish	11	41	No semi-finals	
1986	Lise Haavik	"Du er fuld af løgn"	Danish	6	77	No semi-finals	
1987	Bandjo with Anne-Cathrine Herdorf	"En lille melodi"	Danish	5	83	No semi-finals	
1988	Hot Eyes	"Ka' du se hva' jeg sa'"	Danish	3	92	No semi-finals	
1989	Birthe Kjær	"Vi maler byen rød"	Danish	3	111	No semi-finals	
1990	Lonnie Devantier	"Hallo Hallo"	Danish	8	64	No semi-finals	
1991	Anders Frandsen	"Lige der hvor hjertet slår"	Danish	19	8	No semi-finals	
1992	Lotte Nilsson and Kenny Lübcke	"Alt det som ingen ser"	Danish	12	47	No semi-finals	
1993	Seebach Band	"Under stjernerne på himlen"	Danish	22	9	Kvalifikacija za Millstreet	
1995	Aud Wilken	"Fra Mols til Skagen"	Danish	5	92	No semi-finals	
1996	Dorthe Andersen and Martin Loft ◇	"Kun med dig" ◇	Danish ◇	Failed to qualify (Note: In order to reduce the number of participating countries at the 1996 event a qualifying round was held among all countries except the hosts. Denmark failed to progress from this round; entries which failed to progress have subsequently been discounted by the EBU and do not feature as part of the countries' list of appearances.)		25	22
1997	Kølig Kaj	"Stemmen i mit liv"	Danish	16	25	No semi-finals	
1999	Trine Jepsen and Michael Teschl	"This Time I Mean It"	English	8	71	No semi-finals	
2000	Olsen Brothers	"Fly on the Wings of Love"	English	1	195	No semi-finals	
2001	Rollo and King	"Never Ever Let You Go"	English	2	177	No semi-finals	
2002	Malene	"Tell Me Who You Are"	English	24 ◁	7	No semi-finals	
2004	Tomas Thordarson	"Shame on You"	English	Failed to qualify		13	56
2005	Jakob Sveistrup	"Talking to You"	English	9	125	3	185
2006	Sidsel Ben Semmane	"Twist of Love"	English	18	26	Top 11 in 2005 final (Note: According to the then-Eurovision rules, the top ten non-Big Four countries from the previous year along with the Big Four automatically qualified for the grand final without having to compete in semi-finals. For example, if Germany and France placed inside the top ten, the 11th and 12th spots were advanced to next year's grand final along with all countries ranked in the top ten.)	
2007	DQ	"Drama Queen"	English	Failed to qualify		19	45
2008	Simon Mathew	"All Night Long"	English	15	60	3	112
2009	Brinck	"Believe Again"	English	13	74	8	69
2010	Chanée and N'evergreen	"In a Moment like This"	English	4	149	5	101
2011	A Friend in London	"New Tomorrow"	English	5	134	2	135
2012	Soluna Samay	"Should've Known Better"	English	23	21	9	63
2013	Emmelie de Forest	"Only Teardrops"	English	1	281	1	167
2014	Basim	"Cliche Love Song"	English	9	74	Host country	
2015	Anti Social Media	"The Way You Are"	English	Failed to qualify		13	33
2016	Lighthouse X	"Soldiers of Love"	English	Failed to qualify		17	34
2017	Anja	"Where I Am"	English	20	77	10	101
2018	Rasmussen	"Higher Ground"	English	9	226	5	204
2019	Leonora	"Love Is Forever"	English, French, Danish	12	120	10	94
2020	Ben and Tan ◇	"Yes" ◇	English ◇	Contest cancelled (Note: The 2020 contest was cancelled due to the COVID-19 pandemic.)			
2021	Fyr og Flamme	"Øve os på hinanden"	Danish	Failed to qualify		11	89
2022	Reddi	"The Show"	English	Failed to qualify		13	55
2023	Reiley	"Breaking My Heart"	English	Failed to qualify		14	6
2024	Saba	"Sand"	English	Failed to qualify		12	36
2025	Sissal	"Hallucination"	English	23	47	8	61
2026	Søren Torpegaard Lund	"Før vi går hjem"	Danish	7	243	5	199
2027	Confirmed intention to participate †						

=== Congratulations: 50 Years of the Eurovision Song Contest ===
Artist	Song	Language	At Congratulations				At Eurovision		
Artist	Song	Language	Final	Points	Semi	Points	Year	Place	Points
Olsen Brothers	"Fly on the Wings of Love"	English	Failed to qualify		6	111	2000	1	195

== Hostings ==
Year	Location	Venue	Presenters	Photo	Ref.
1964	Copenhagen	Tivolis Koncertsal	Lotte Wæver		
2001	Copenhagen	Parken Stadium	Natasja Crone Back and Søren Pilmark		
2014	Copenhagen	B&W Hallerne	Lise Rønne, Nikolaj Koppel and Pilou Asbæk		

In addition to the contest proper, Denmark hosted Congratulations: 50 Years of the Eurovision Song Contest, a special competitive programme commemorating the contest's 50th anniversary, at Forum Copenhagen in Copenhagen. The show, which was broadcast on 22 October 2005, was presented by Katrina Leskanich and Renārs Kaupers.

== Awards ==
=== Winner by OGAE members ===
Year	Song	Performer	Place	Points	Host city	Ref.
2010	"In a Moment like This"	Chanée and N'evergreen	4	149	(Norway) Oslo	
2013	"Only Teardrops"	Emmelie de Forest	1	281	(Sweden) Malmö	

=== Marcel Bezençon Awards ===
Year	Category	Song	Performer	Composer(s) lyrics (l) / music (m)	Final result	Points	Host city	Ref.
2026	Composer Award	"Før Vi Går Hjem"	Søren Torpegaard Lund	Clara Sofie Fabricius, Søren Torpegaard Lund, Thomas Meilstrup, Valdemar Littauer Bendixen	7	243	(Austria) Vienna	

== Related involvement ==
=== Heads of delegation ===
Year	Head of delegation	Ref.
2018	Molly Plank	
2025–present	Erik Struve Hansen	

=== Conductors ===
Year	Conductor (Note: All conductors are of Danish nationality unless otherwise noted.)	Musical Director	Notes	Ref.
1957	Kai Mortensen	N/A		
1958	Kai Mortensen	N/A		
1959	Kai Mortensen	N/A		
1960	Kai Mortensen	N/A		
1961	Kai Mortensen	N/A		
1962	Kai Mortensen	N/A		
1963	Kai Mortensen	N/A		
1964	Kai Mortensen		(Note: Also conducted the Portuguese entry.)	
1965	(Sweden) Arne Lamberth	N/A		
1966	(Sweden) Arne Lamberth	N/A		
1978	Helmer Olesen	N/A		
1979	Allan Botschinsky	N/A		
1980	Allan Botschinsky	N/A		
1981	Allan Botschinsky	N/A		
1982	Allan Botschinsky	N/A		
1983	Allan Botschinsky	N/A		
1984	Henrik Krogsgård	N/A	(Note: That year's Danish national final was presented without an orchestra)	
1985	(Germany) Wolfgang Käfer	N/A	(Note: That year's Danish national final was presented without an orchestra)	
1986	(Norway) Egil Monn-Iversen	N/A	Host conductor	
1987	Henrik Krogsgård	N/A		
1988	Henrik Krogsgård	N/A		
1989	Henrik Krogsgård and (France) Benoît Kaufman (Note: Host conductor)	N/A	(Note: Krogsgård conducted the first half of the Danish entry. Part of the way through, as part of the staging, he was beckoned by Birthe Kjær to join her on stage, at which point he left the podium to sing with her backing group while Kaufman conducted the rest of the song. Krogsgård conducted the entire song at the national final.)	
1990	Henrik Krogsgård	N/A		
1991	Henrik Krogsgård	N/A		
1992	Henrik Krogsgård	N/A		
1993	(Norway) George Keller	N/A	(Note: Conducted by Henrik Krogsgård at the national final.)	
1995	Frede Ewert	N/A		
1996	Failed to qualify	N/A	(Note: Conducted by Frede Ewert at the national final.)	
1997	Jan Glæsel	N/A		
1999	No orchestra	N/A	(Note: Although there was no orchestra at the international final, there was one present for the Danish selection show, conducted by Ken Børjesen.)	

Additionally, a live band has performed at the Danish national final since 2020, led by Peter Düring.

=== Commentators and spokespersons ===
Television and radio commentators and spokespersons
Year	Television		Radio		Spokesperson	Ref.
Year	Channel	Commentator(s)	Channel	Commentator(s)	Spokesperson	Ref.
1956	Statsradiofonien TV	Jens Frederik Lawaetz	No radio broadcast		Did not participate	
1957	Statsradiofonien TV	Svend Pedersen	Program 2	Svend Pedersen	Unknown	
1958	Statsradiofonien TV	Svend Pedersen	Program 1	Svend Pedersen	Unknown	
1959	Danmarks Radio TV	Sejr Volmer-Sørensen	Program 2	Sejr Volmer-Sørensen	Unknown	
1960	Danmarks Radio TV	Sejr Volmer-Sørensen	Program 2	Sejr Volmer-Sørensen	Unknown	
1961	Danmarks Radio TV	Sejr Volmer-Sørensen	Program 1	Sejr Volmer-Sørensen	Unknown	
1962	Danmarks Radio TV	Ole Mortensen	Program 2	Ole Mortensen	Unknown	
1963	Danmarks Radio TV	Ole Mortensen	Program 1	Ole Mortensen	Unknown	
1964	DR TV	Claus Walter	DR P1, DR P3	Claus Walter	Unknown	
1965	DR TV	Unknown	No radio broadcast		Unknown	
1966	DR TV	Skat Nørrevig	No radio broadcast		Unknown	
1967–1974	No broadcast				Did not participate	
1975	DR TV	Per Møller Hansen	No radio broadcast		Did not participate	
1976	DR TV	Per Møller Hansen	No radio broadcast		Did not participate	
1977	DR TV	Claus Toksvig	No radio broadcast		Did not participate	
1978	DR TV	Jørgen de Mylius	No radio broadcast		Unknown	
1979	DR TV	Jørgen de Mylius	No radio broadcast		Unknown	
1980	DR TV	Jørgen de Mylius	No radio broadcast		Bent Evold	
1981	DR TV	Jørgen de Mylius	No radio broadcast		Unknown	
1982	DR TV	Jørgen de Mylius	No radio broadcast		Unknown	
1983	DR TV	Jørgen de Mylius	No radio broadcast		Bent Evold	
1984	DR TV	Jørgen de Mylius	No radio broadcast		Unknown	
1985	DR TV	Jørgen de Mylius	No radio broadcast		Unknown	
1986	DR TV	Jørgen de Mylius	No radio broadcast		Unknown	
1987	DR TV	Jørgen de Mylius	No radio broadcast		Unknown	
1988	DR TV	Jørgen de Mylius	DR P2	Jørgen de Mylius	Unknown	
1989	DR TV	Jørgen de Mylius	DR P3	Kurt Helge Andersen	Unknown	
1990	DR TV	Jørgen de Mylius	DR P3	Karlo Staunskær and Kurt Helge Andersen	Unknown	
1991	DR TV	Camilla Miehe-Renard	DR P3	Jesper Bæhrenz and Andrew Jensen	Unknown	
1992	DR TV	Jørgen de Mylius	DR P3	Jesper Bæhrenz and Andrew Jensen	Unknown	
1993	DR TV	Jørgen de Mylius	DR P3	Jens Michael Nielsen	Unknown	
1994	DR TV	Jørgen de Mylius	No radio broadcast		Did not participate	
1995	DR TV	Jørgen de Mylius	DR P3	Jørgen de Mylius	Bent Henius	
1996	DR TV	Jørgen de Mylius	DR P3	Katrine Nyland Sørensen, Martin Loft and Marianne Dinesen	Did not participate	
1997	DR1	Hans Otto Bisgaard	DR P3	Katrine Nyland Sørensen and Morten H. Pankoke	Bent Henius	
1998	DR1	Keld Heick	No radio broadcast		Did not participate	
1999	DR1	Keld Heick	No radio broadcast		Kirsten Siggaard	
2000	DR1	Keld Heick	No radio broadcast		Michael Teschl	
2001	DR1	Hans Otto Bisgaard and Hilda Heick	DR P3	Unknown	Gry Johansen	
2002	DR1	Keld Heick	No radio broadcast		Signe Svendsen	
2003	DR1	Jørgen de Mylius	No radio broadcast		Did not participate	
2004	DR1	Jørgen de Mylius	No radio broadcast		Camilla Ottesen	
2005	DR1	Jørgen de Mylius	No radio broadcast		Gry Johansen	
2006	DR1	Mads Vangsø and Adam Duvå Hall	No radio broadcast		Jørgen de Mylius	
2007	DR1	Søren Nystrøm Rasted and Adam Duvå Hall	No radio broadcast		Susanne Georgi	
2008	DR1	Nicolai Molbech	No radio broadcast		Maria Montell	
2009	DR1	Nicolai Molbech	No radio broadcast		Felix Smith	
2010 (Note: The 2010 final was re-broadcast on 26 June 2010 at 13:47 (CEST))	DR1	Nicolai Molbech	No radio broadcast		Bryan Rice	
2011	DR1, DR HD	Ole Tøpholm	No radio broadcast		Lise Rønne	
2012	DR1, DR HD	Ole Tøpholm	No radio broadcast		Louise Wolff	
2013	DR1	Ole Tøpholm	No radio broadcast		Sofie Lassen-Kahlke	
2014	DR1	Anders Bisgaard (Semi-finals); Ole Tøpholm (Final)	DR P4	Anders Bisgaard	Sofie Lassen-Kahlke	
2014	DR3 (Final)	Peter Falktoft and Esben Bjerre Hansen	DR P4	Anders Bisgaard	Sofie Lassen-Kahlke	
2014	DR Ramasjang (Final)	Sign language interpreters	DR P4	Anders Bisgaard	Sofie Lassen-Kahlke	
2015	DR1	Ole Tøpholm	No radio broadcast		Basim	
2015	DR Ramasjang	Sign language interpreters	No radio broadcast		Basim	
2016	DR1	Ole Tøpholm	No radio broadcast		Ulla Essendrop	
2016	DR Ramasjang	Sign language interpreters	No radio broadcast		Ulla Essendrop	
2017	DR1	Ole Tøpholm	No radio broadcast		Ulla Essendrop	
2018	DR1	Ole Tøpholm	No radio broadcast		Ulla Essendrop	
2019	DR1	Ole Tøpholm	No radio broadcast		Rasmussen	
~~2020~~	Not announced before cancellation					
2021	DR1	Henrik Milling and Nicolai Molbech	No radio broadcast		Tina Müller	
2022	DR1	Henrik Milling and Nicolai Molbech	No radio broadcast		Tina Müller	
2023	DR1	Nicolai Molbech	No radio broadcast		Tina Müller	
2024	DR1	Ole Tøpholm	No radio broadcast		Stéphanie Surrugue	
2025	DR1	Ole Tøpholm	No radio broadcast		Sara Bro	
2026	DR1	Ole Tøpholm	No radio broadcast		Sissal	

== Photo gallery ==
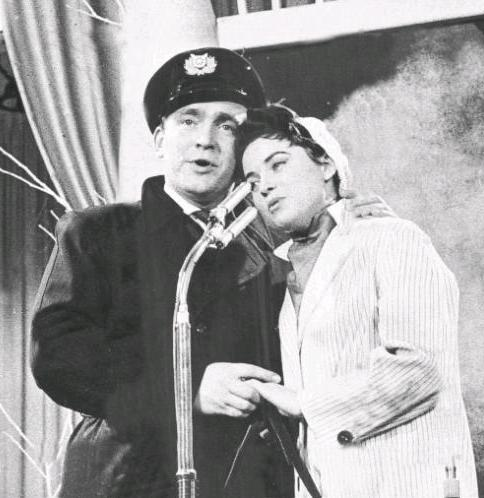
Birthe Wilke and Gustav Winckler in Frankfurt (1957)

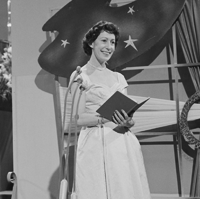
Raquel Rastenni in Hilversum (1958)

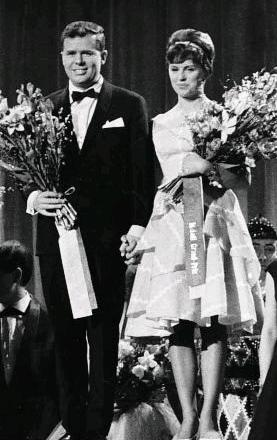
Grethe and Jørgen Ingmann (1963)

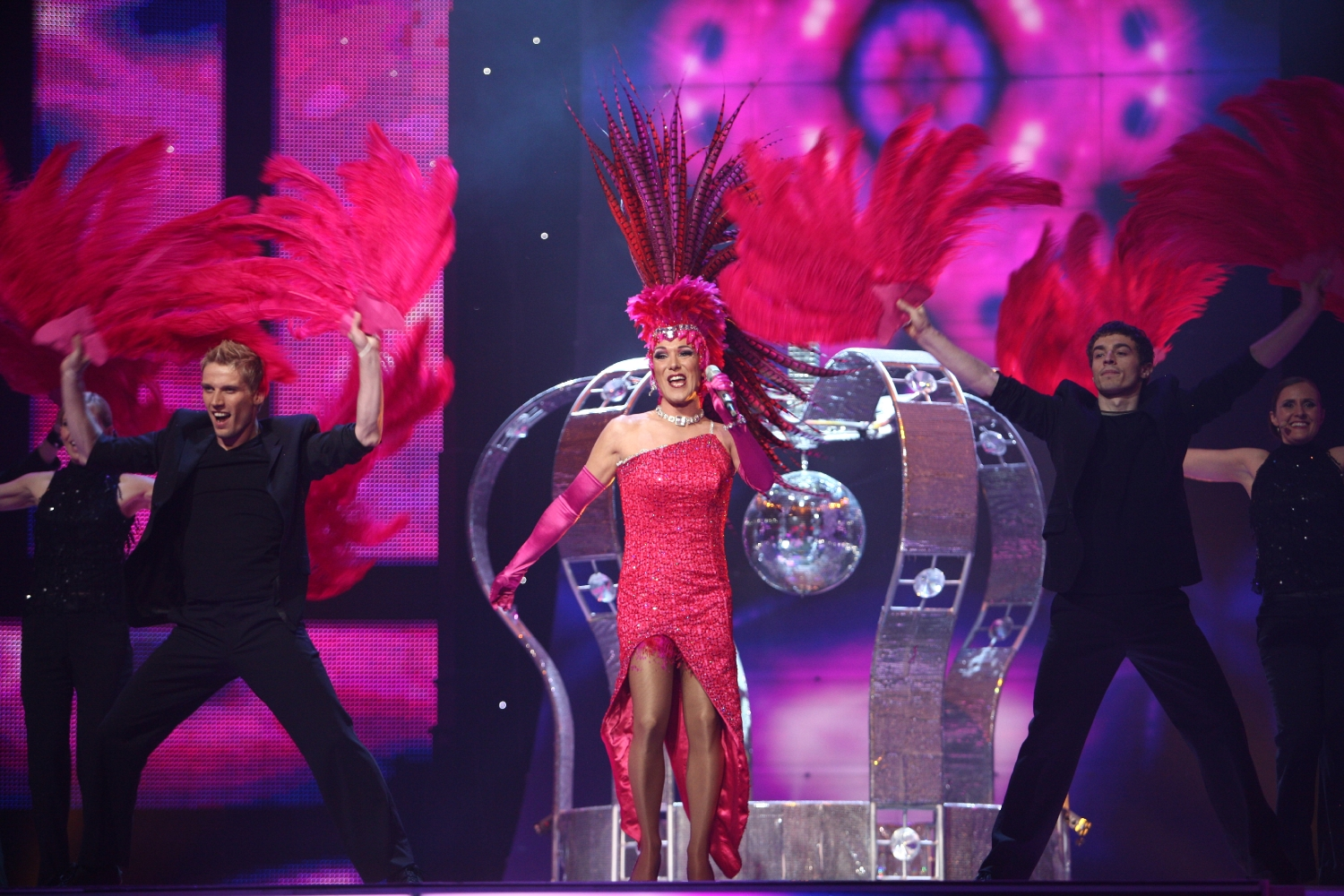
DQ in Helsinki (2007)

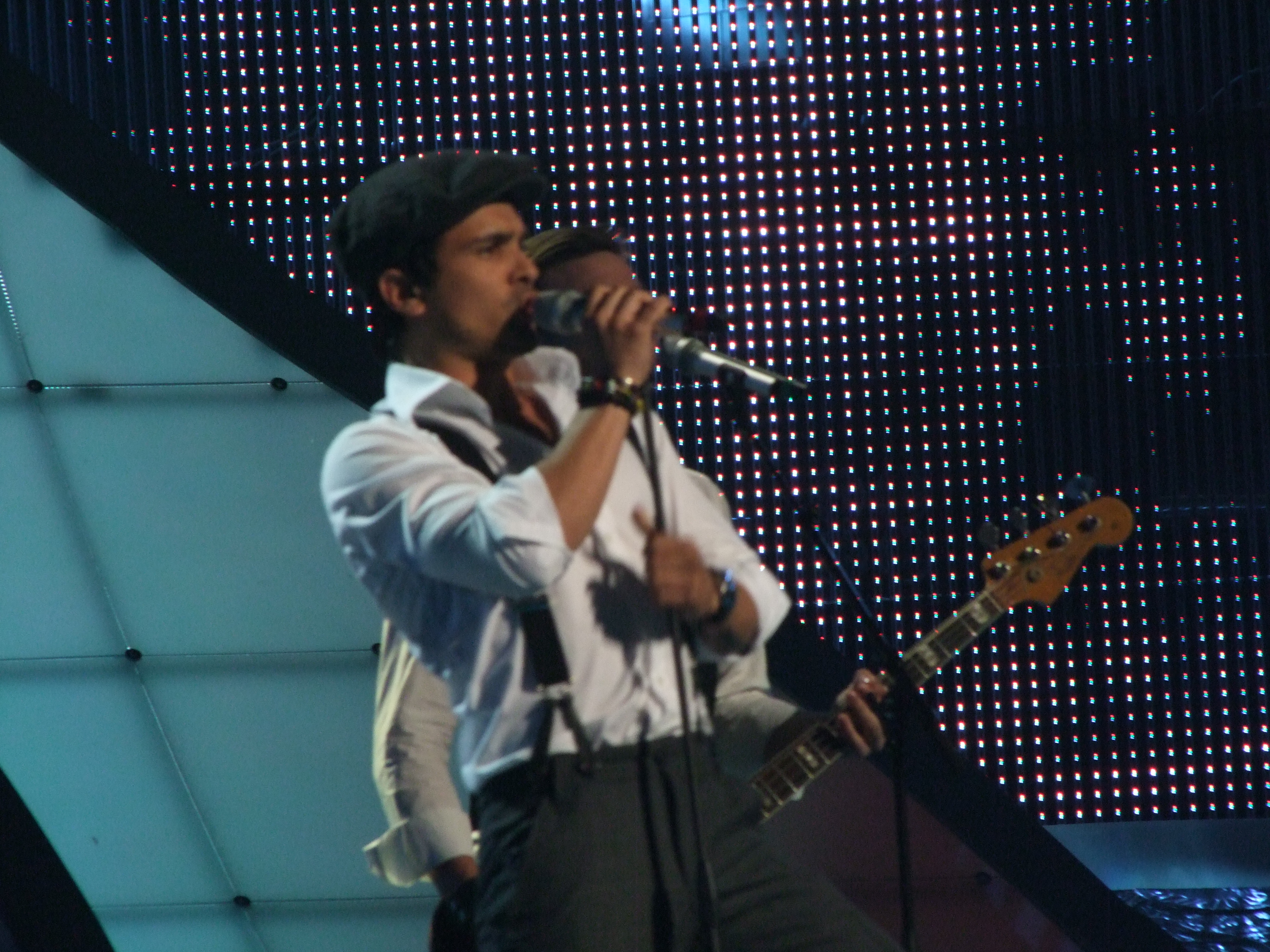
Simon Mathew in Belgrade (2008)

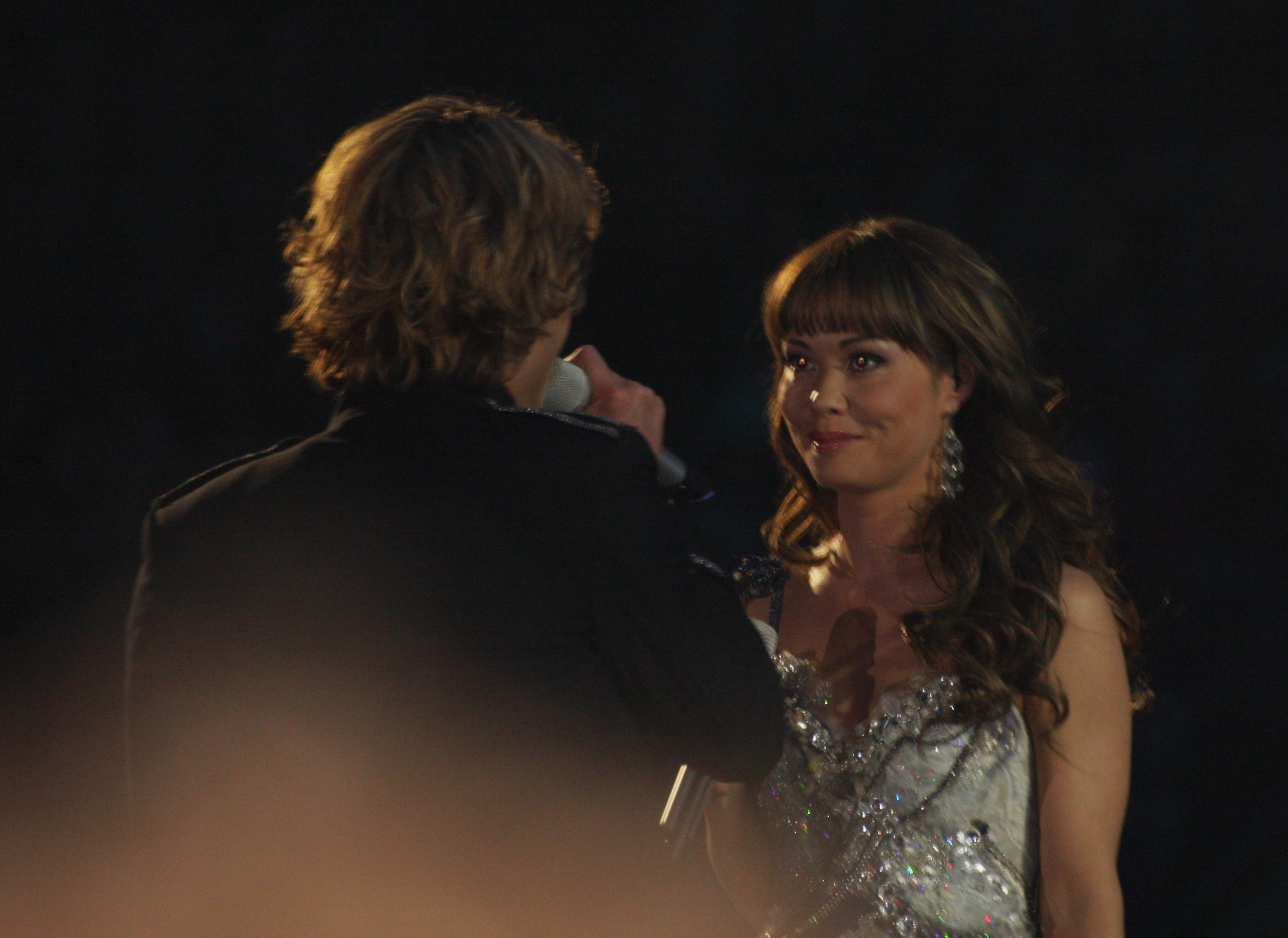
Chanée and N'evergreen in Oslo (2010)

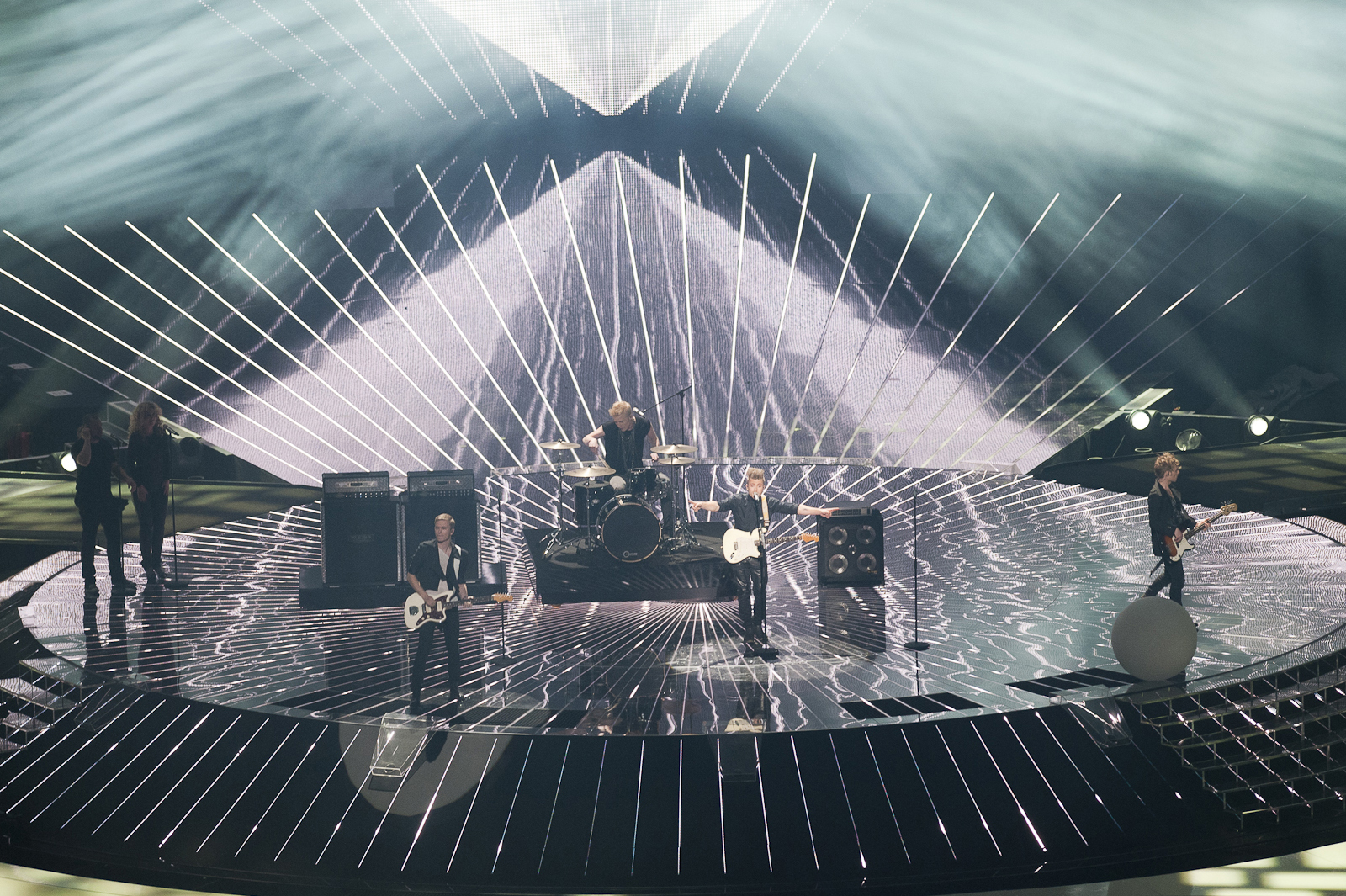
A Friend in London in Düsseldorf (2011)

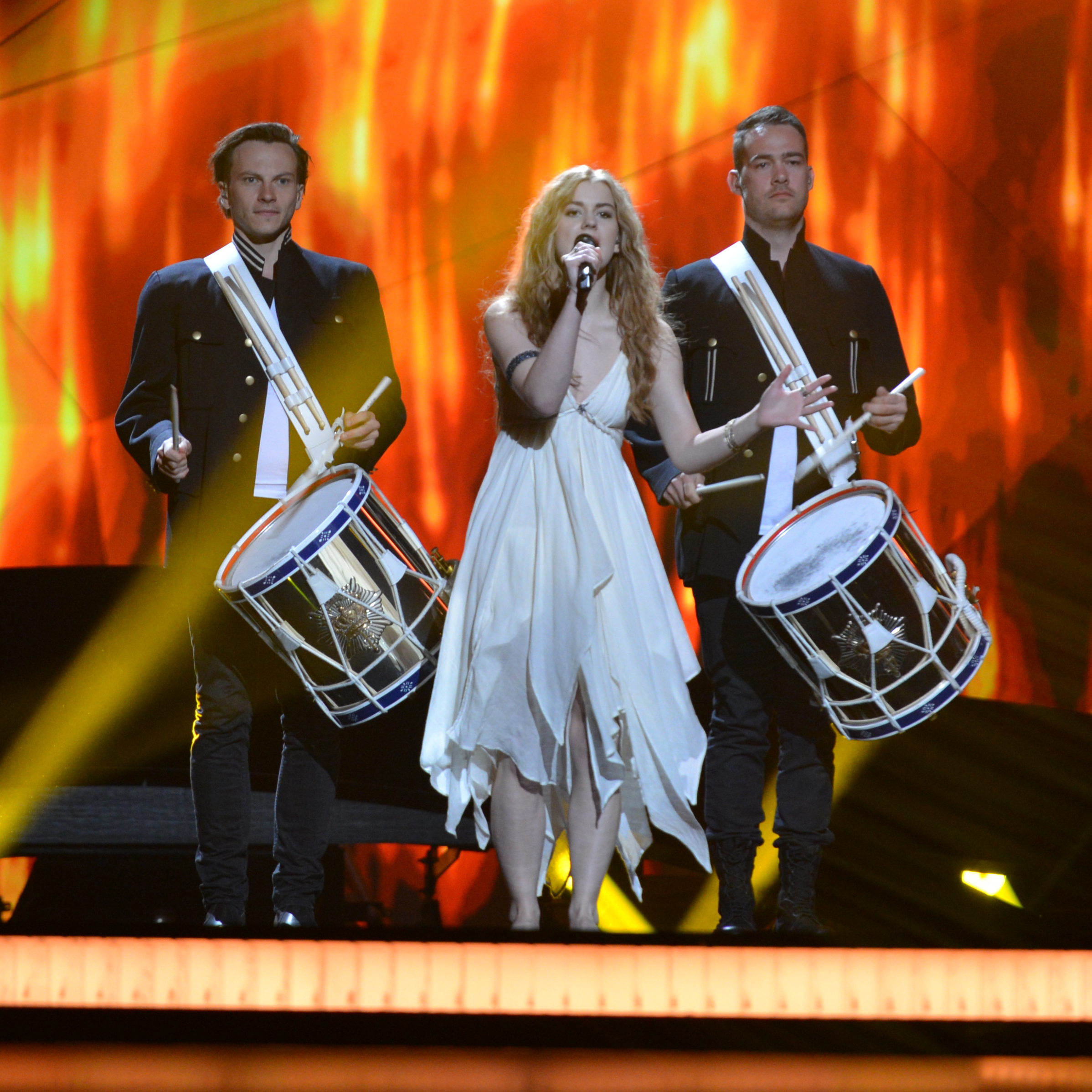
Emmelie de Forest in Malmö (2013)

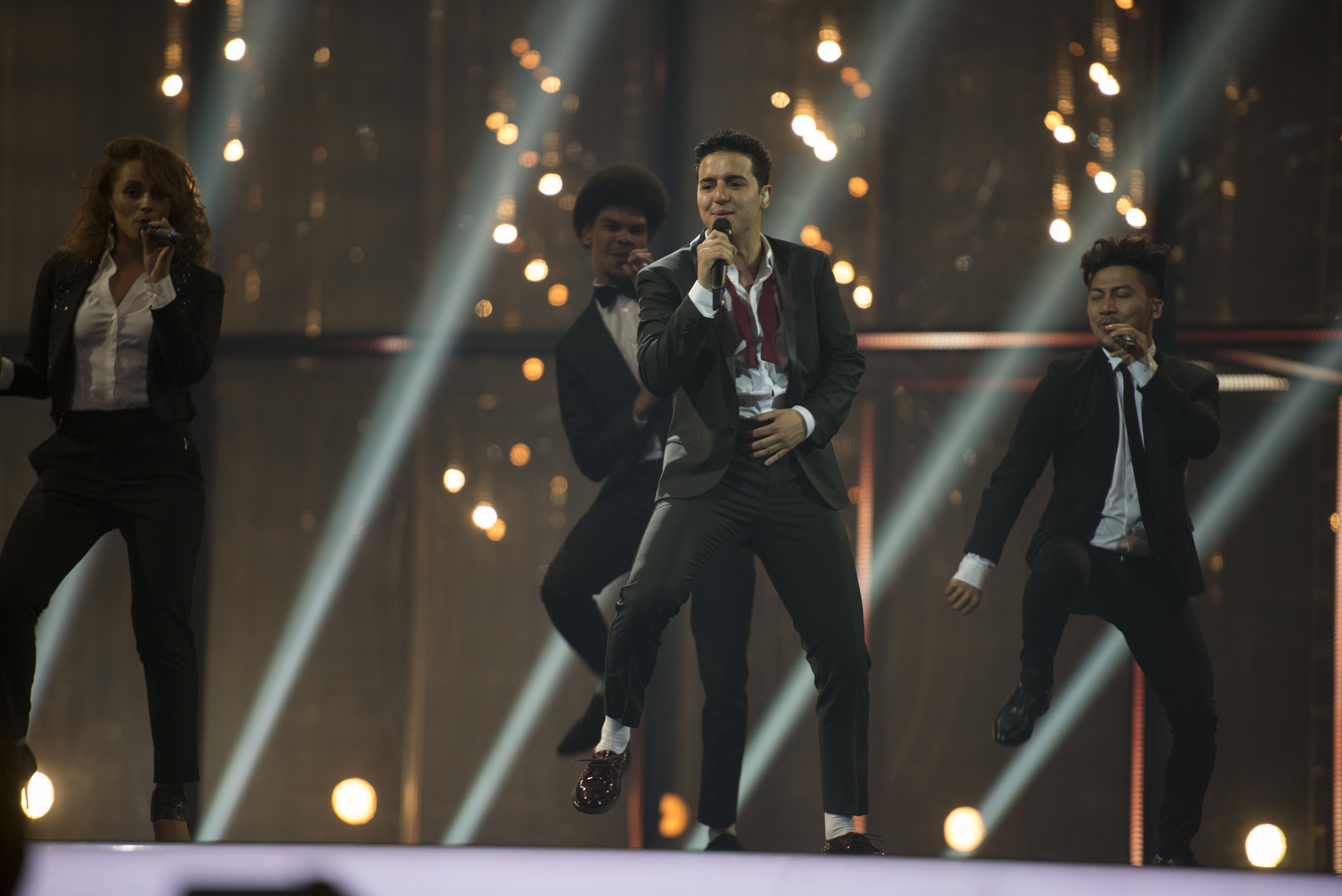
Basim in Copenhagen (2014)

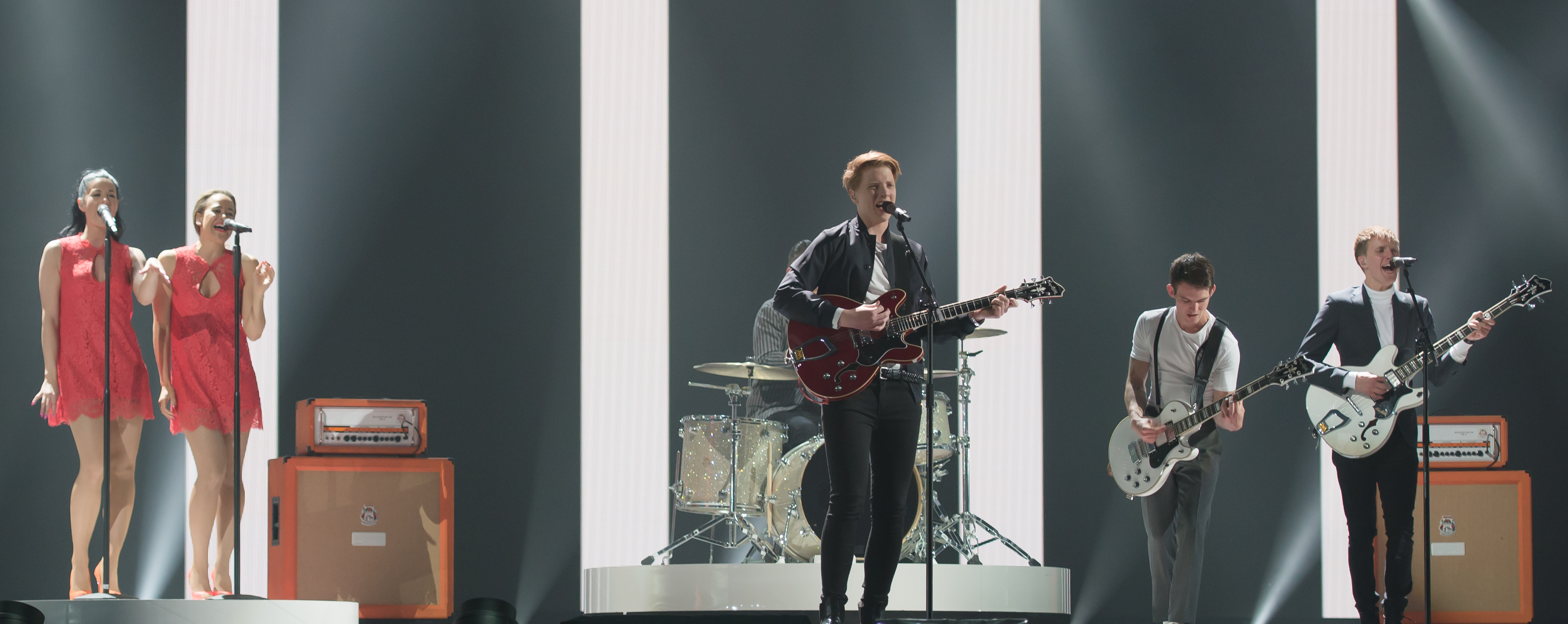
Anti Social Media in Vienna (2015)

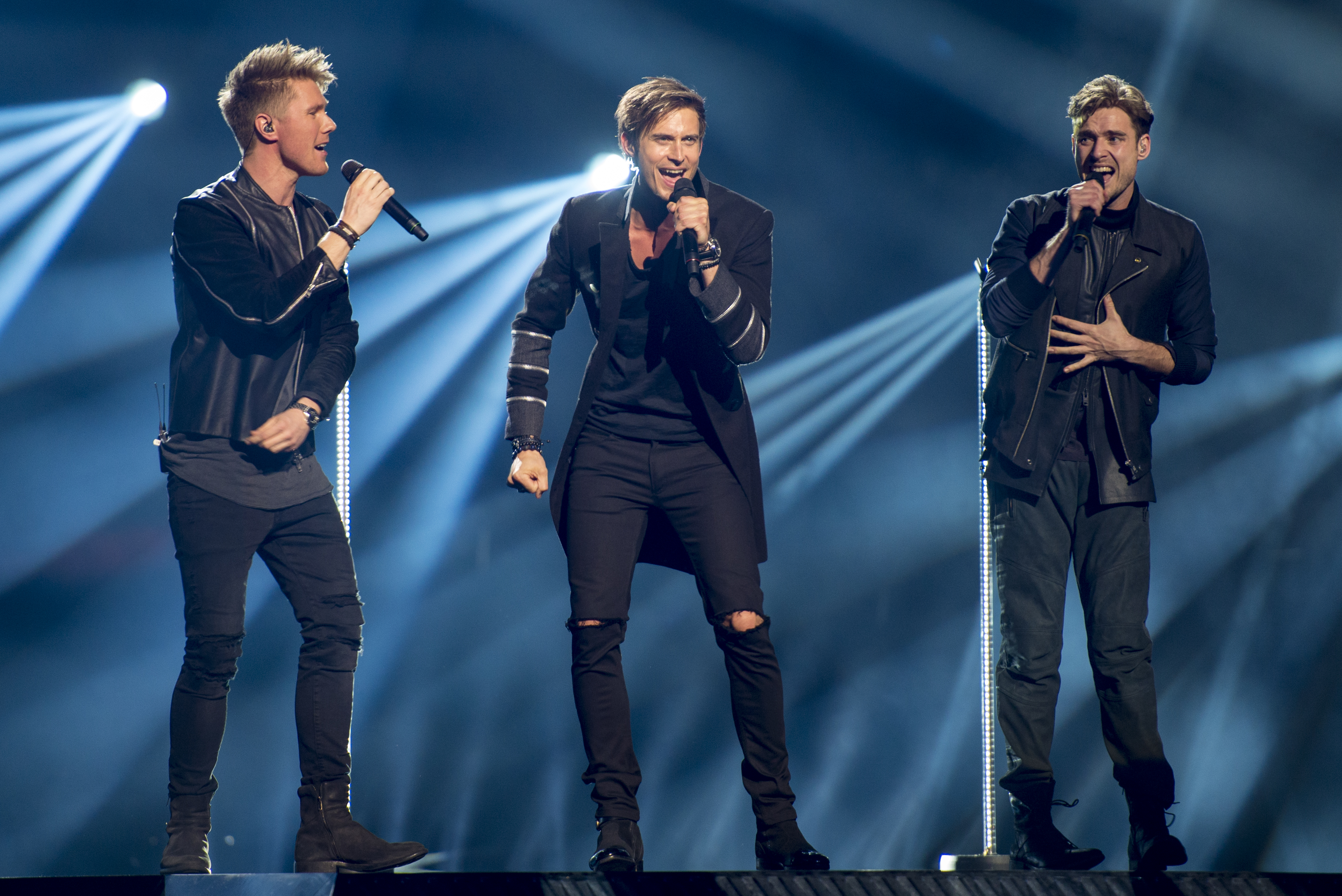
Lighthouse X in Stockholm (2016)

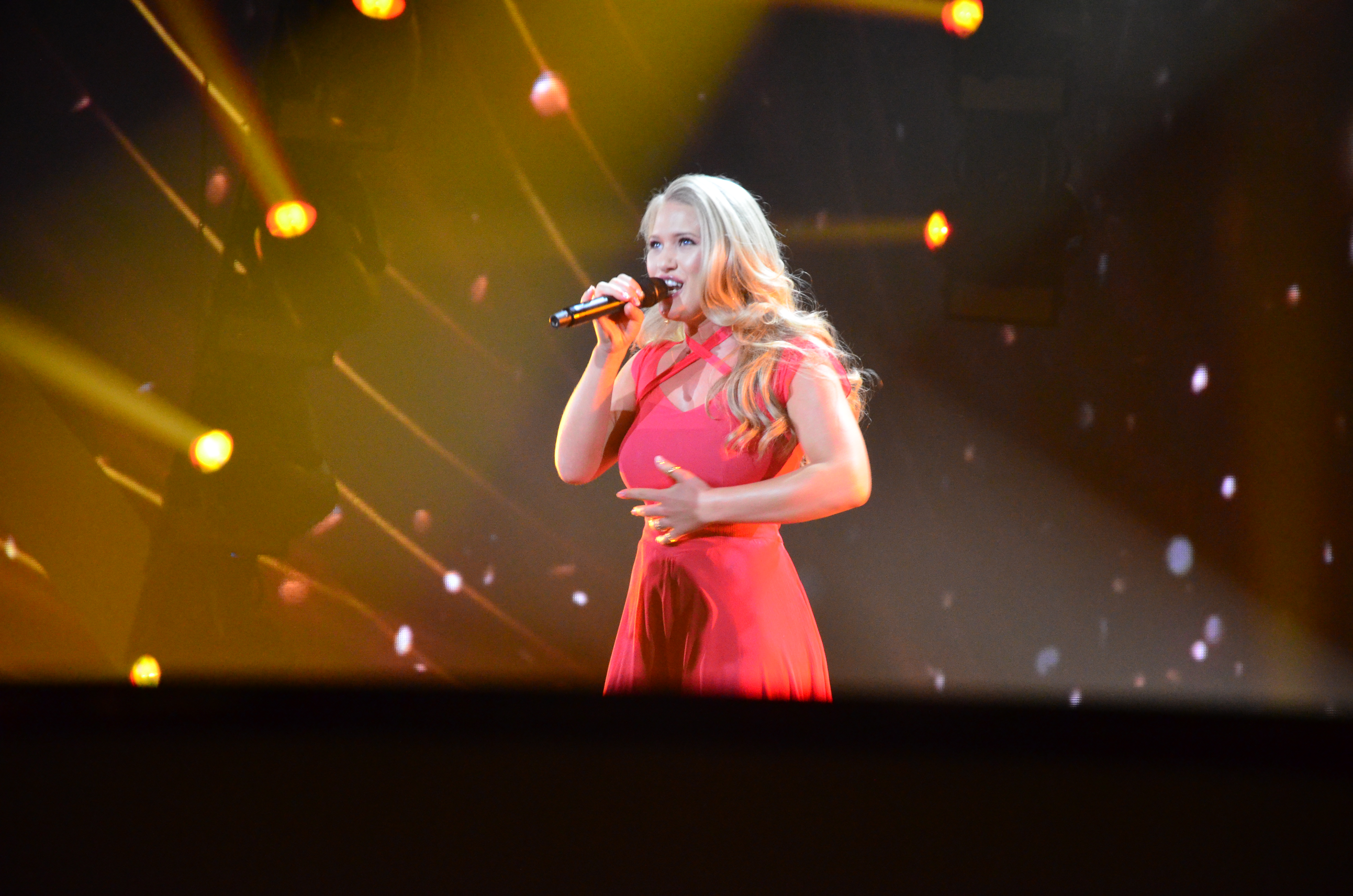
Anja Nissen in Kyiv (2017)

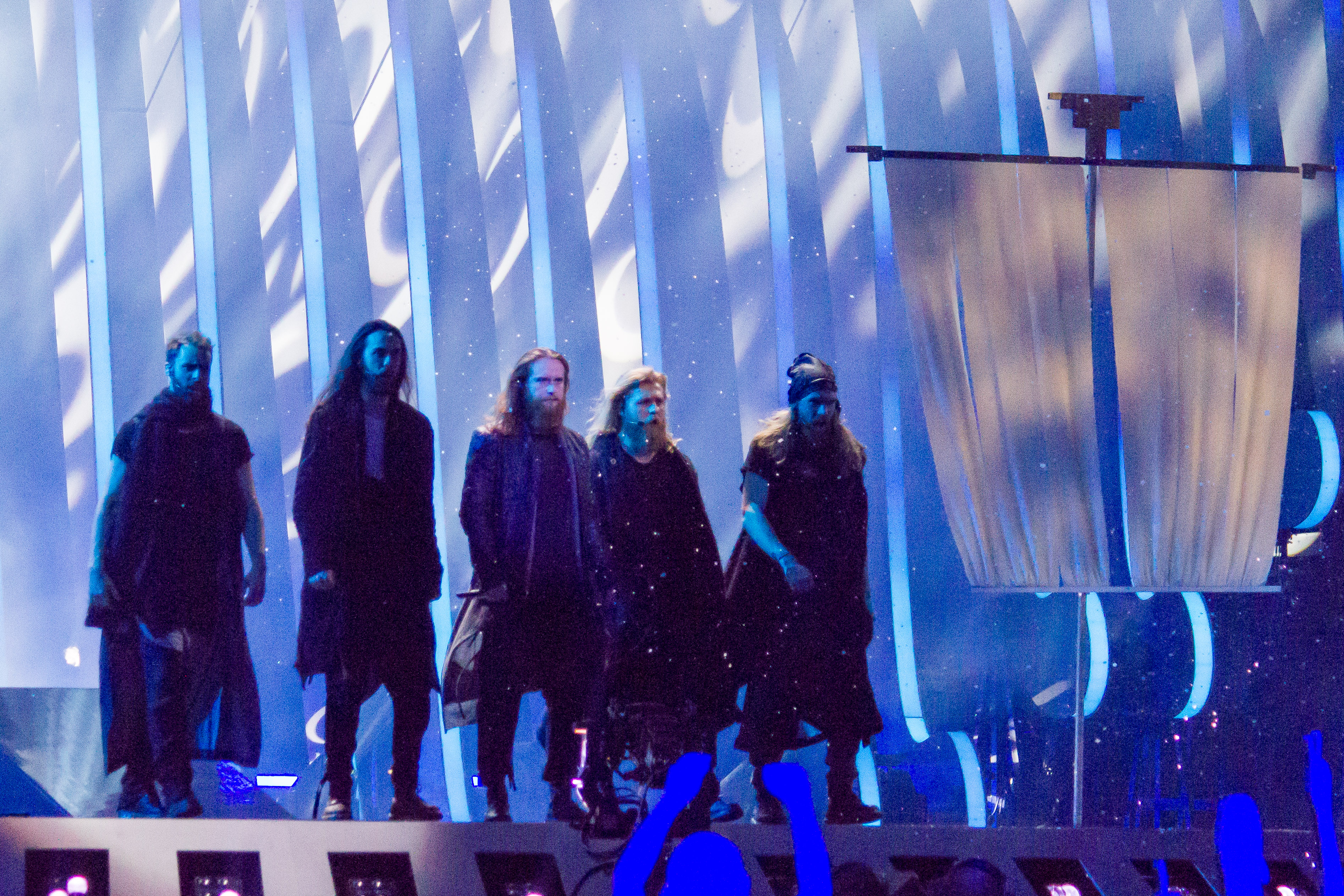
Rasmussen in Lisbon (2018)

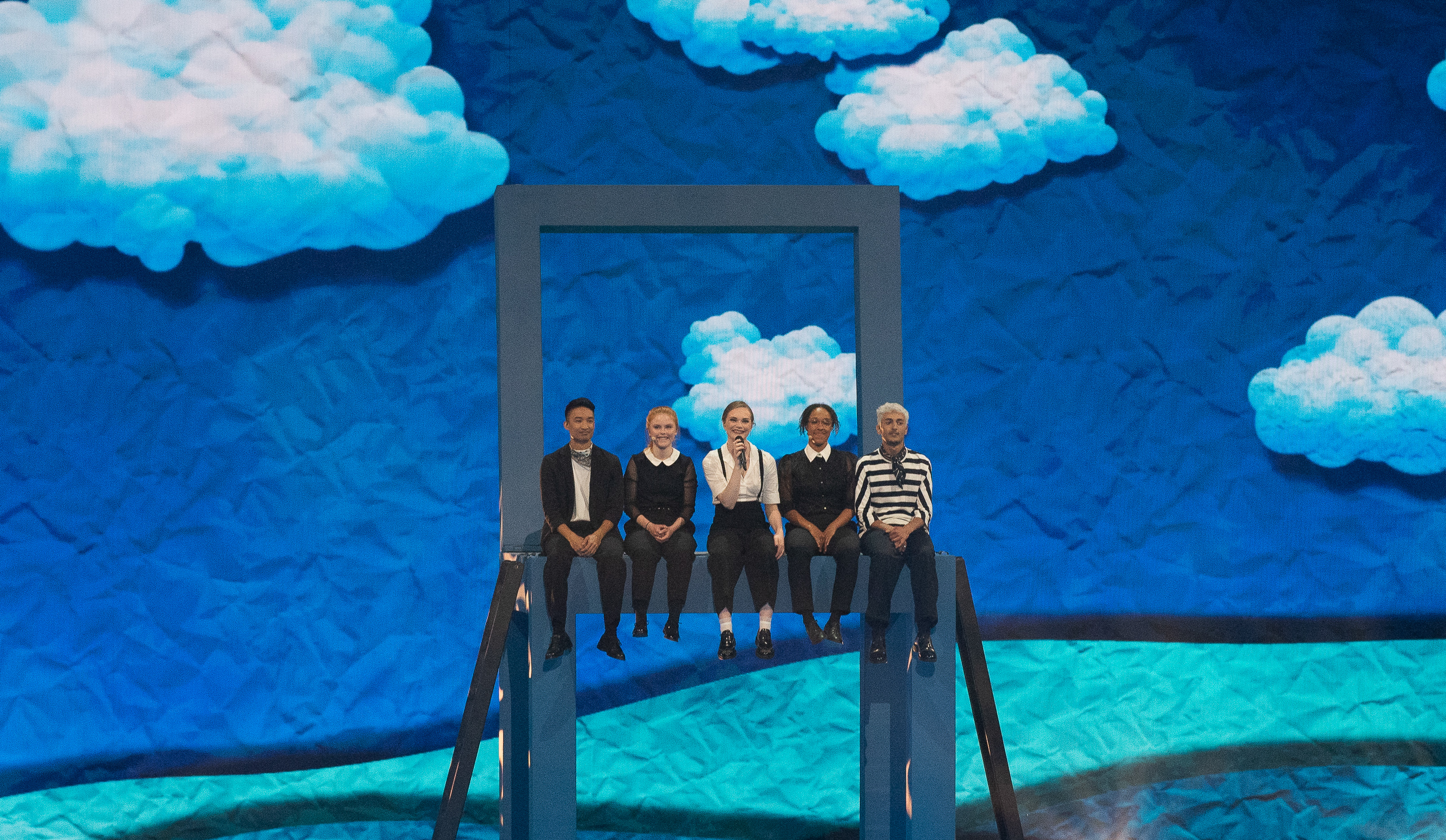
Leonora in Tel Aviv (2019)

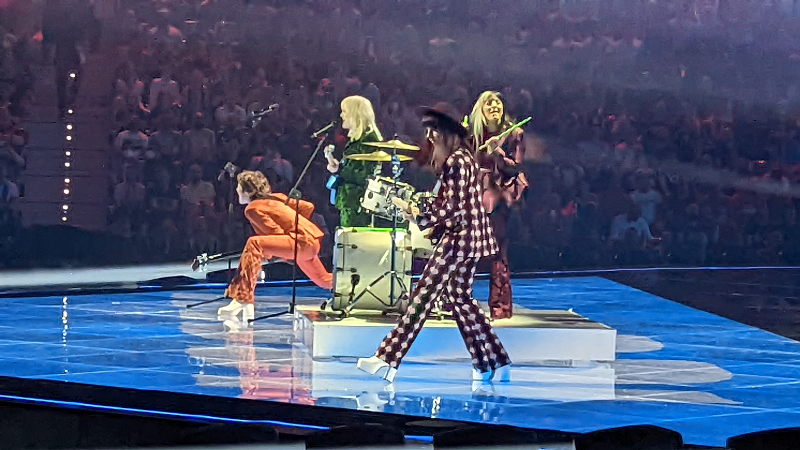
Reddi in Turin (2022)

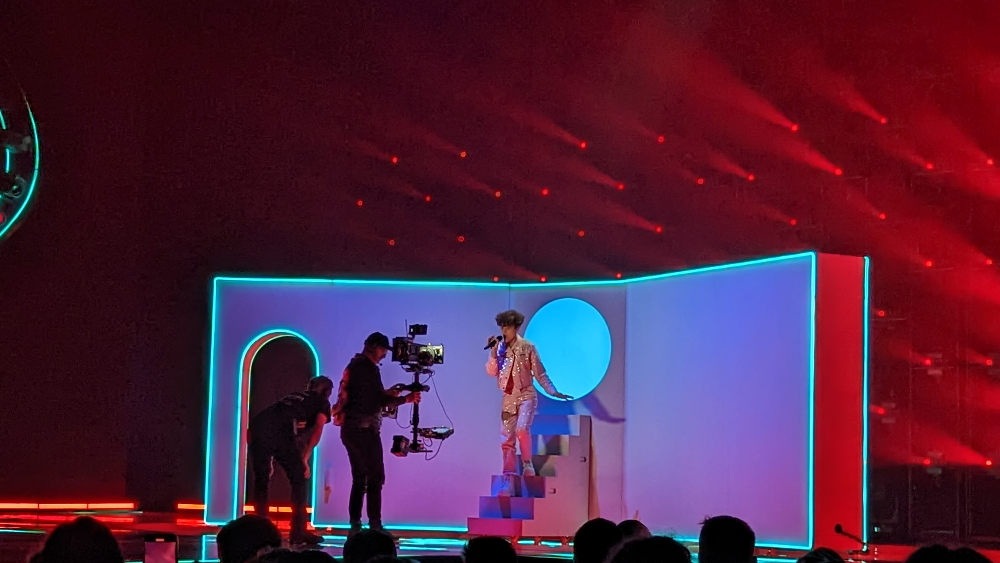
Reiley in Liverpool (2023)

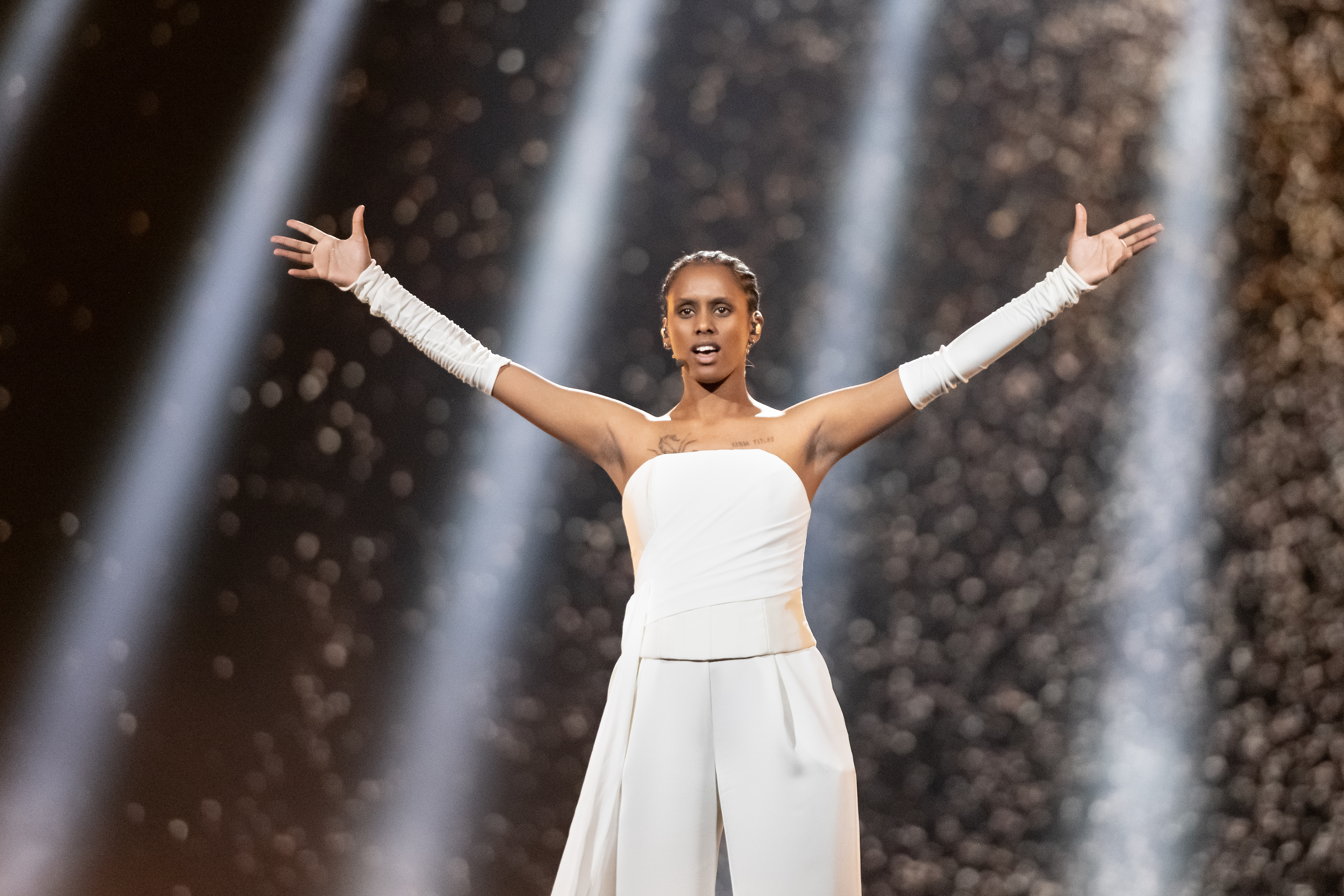
Saba in Malmö (2024)

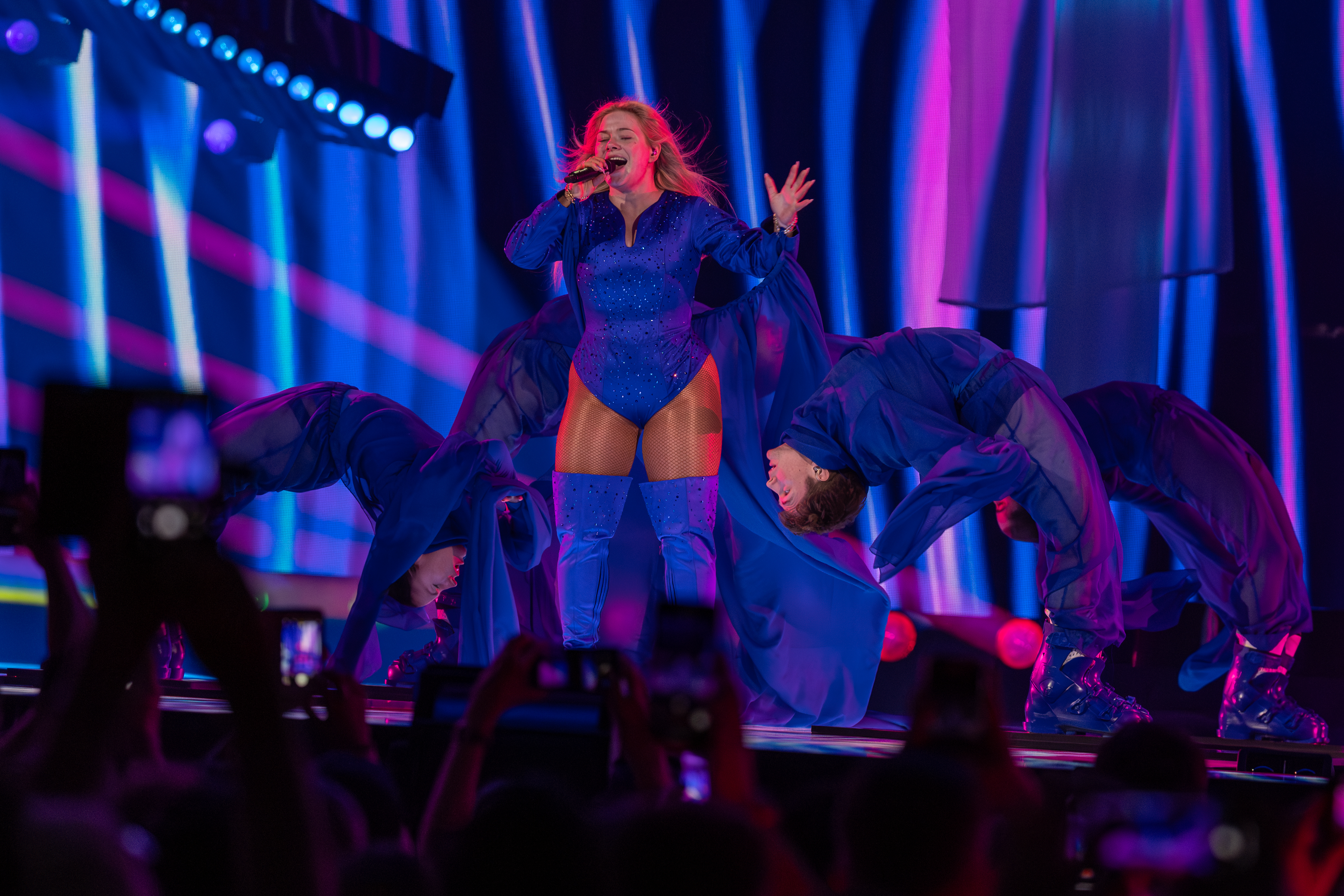
Sissal in Basel (2025)

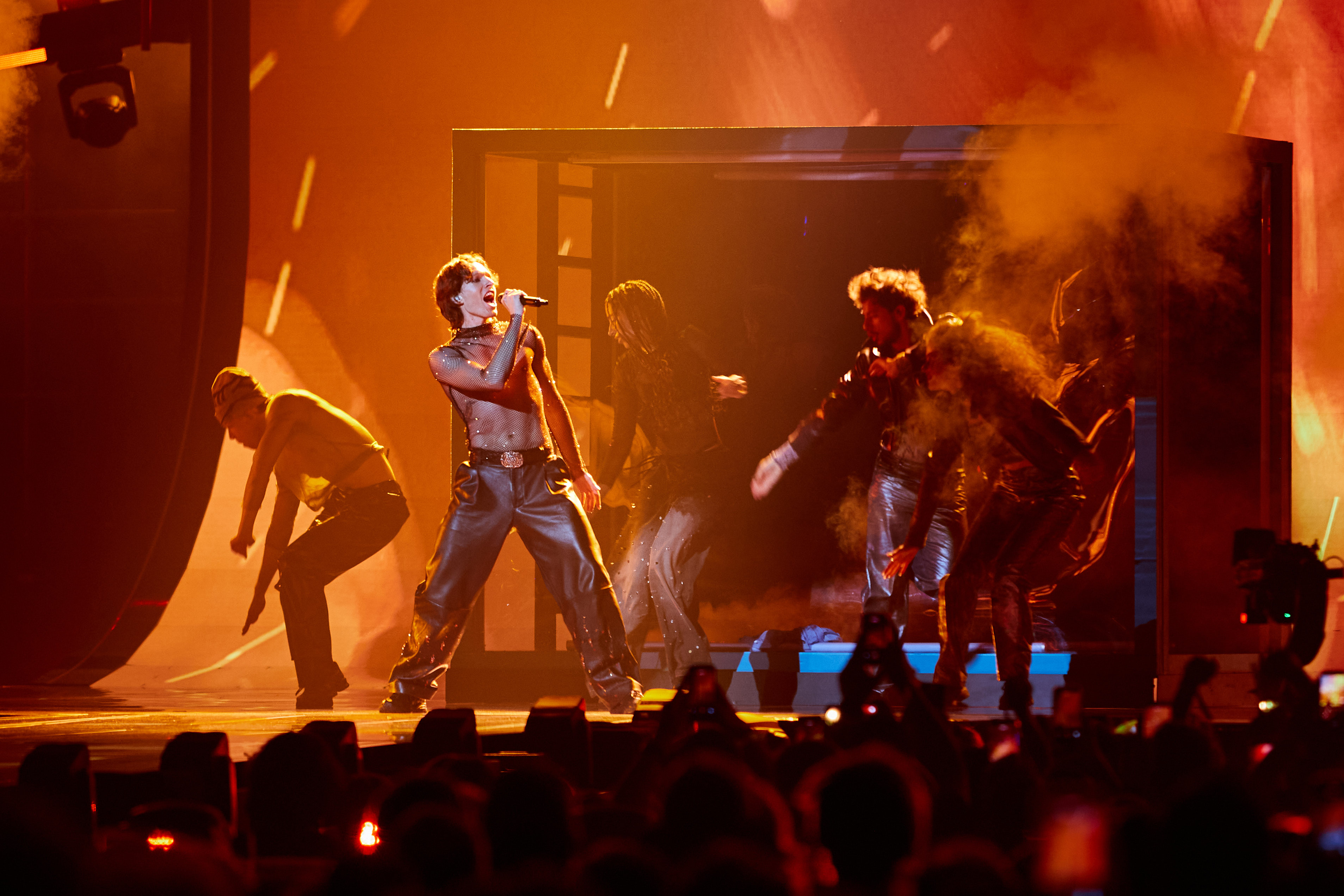
Søren Torpegaard Lund in Vienna (2026)

== See also ==
- Dansk Melodi Grand Prix
- Dansk Melodi Grand Prix winners
- Denmark in the Junior Eurovision Song Contest
