= The Show (Reddi song) =

2022 song by Reddi

Single by Reddi
- Language: English
- Released: 10 February 2022
- Genre: Pop rock
- Length: 3:00
- Label: Universal Music Denmark
- Songwriters: Chief 1; Ihan Haydar; Julia Fabrin; Remee Jackman; Siggy Savery

Reddi singles chronology
"The Show" (2022)	"Bad Pop Song" (2022)

Music video
- "The Show" on YouTube

Eurovision Song Contest 2022 entry
- Country: Denmark
- Artist: Reddi
- Language: English
- Composers: Chief 1; Ihan Haydar; Julia Fabrin; Remee Jackman; Siggy Savery
- Lyricists: Chief 1; Ihan Haydar; Julia Fabrin; Remee Jackman; Siggy Savery

Finals performance
- Semi-final result: 13th
- Semi-final points: 55

Entry chronology
- ◄ "Øve os på hinanden" (2021)
- "Breaking My Heart" (2023) ►

"The Show" is a 2022 single by Danish-Swedish punk rock band Reddi. The song represented Denmark in the Eurovision Song Contest 2022 in Turin, Italy after winning Dansk Melodi Grand Prix 2022, Denmark's national final.

== Release ==
The song was released on 10 February 2022, along with all other songs competing in Dansk Melodi Grand Prix 2022.

== Eurovision Song Contest ==
The song was selected to represent Denmark in the Eurovision Song Contest 2022, after winning Dansk Melodi Grand Prix, the music competition that selects Denmark's entries for the Eurovision Song Contest. The semi-finals of the 2022 contest featured the same line-up of countries as determined by the draw for the 2021 contest's semi-finals. Denmark performed in the second half of the first semi-final, hold on 12 May 2022.

== Critical reception ==
Kasper Madsbøll Christensen, a reporter for DR, reviewed that while he praised the energy of the band's live performances, that "it sounds a bit old-fashioned". In addition, he said that "[we are] not [coming] close to winning Eurovision", and that he thought that Denmark would not reach the final.

== Charts ==
=== Weekly charts ===
Chart (2022)	Peak position
Denmark (Top of ChartBase)	51
