= Reddi (band) =

Danish-Swedish band

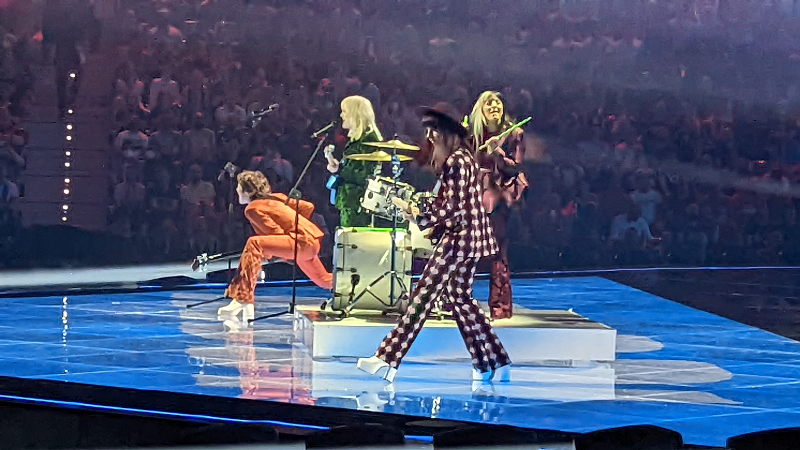
- Reddi at the Eurovision Song Contest 2022

Background information
- Origin: Denmark; Sweden
- Genres: Pop rock, punk rock
- Years active: 2021 – present
- Label: Chiefment
- Members: Mathilde "Siggy" Savery; Ida Bergkvist; Ihan Haydar
- Past members: Agnes Roslund
- Website: www.wearereddi.net

Reddi (often stylised in all caps) is a Danish-Swedish all-female pop-rock band. The band represented Denmark in the Eurovision Song Contest 2022 with the song "The Show".

== Members ==
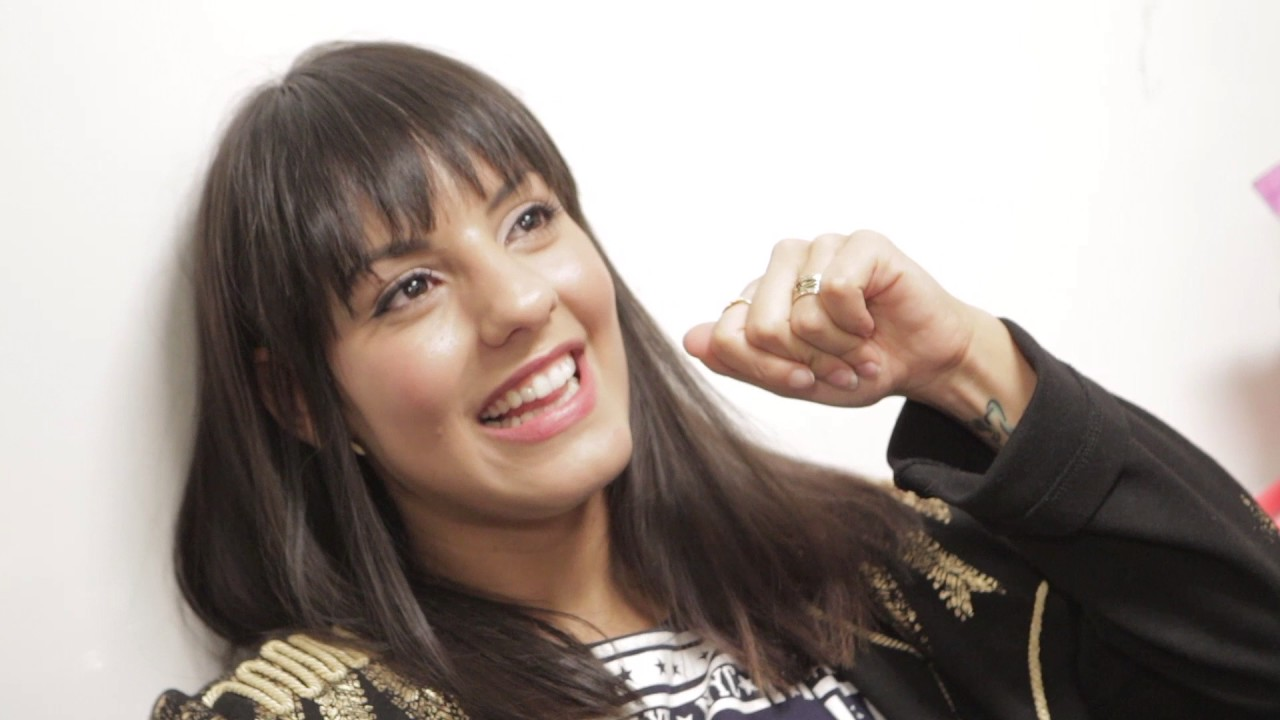
Ihan Haydar, co-founder and drummer of the band

- Mathilde "Siggy" Savery (from Denmark) – vocals, piano and guitar
- Ida Bergkvist (from Sweden) – bass and guitar
- Ihan Haydar (from Denmark) – drums

=== Past members ===
- Agnes Roslund (from Sweden, 2021–2022) – guitar

== Discography ==
=== Singles ===
List of singles
Year	Title
2022	"The Show"
2022	"Bad Pop Song"

Awards and achievements
Preceded by Fyr & Flamme with "Øve os på hinanden"	Denmark in the Eurovision Song Contest; 2022	Succeeded by Reiley with "Breaking My Heart"
