= Juncker (singer) =

Danish singer and guitarist

Christian Juncker, better known by his mononym Juncker, is a Danish pop singer, songwriter and guitarist signed to Columbia Records, and later to ArtPeople and eventually Target Records.

Juncker was born in Holstebro, Denmark. He started in 1995 in the Danish band Bloom and in the 2000s formed for some time a duo in collaboration with Jakob Groth Bastiansen known also as Juncker.

Christian has developed a solo singer-songwriter career and had a comeback with the song "Havana" in 2014, the theme of the Danish television series Kurs Mod Fjerne Kyster. The song was co-written by Christian Juncker and Henrik Balling.

He also worked as a musical pop duo for some time

== Discography ==
=== Albums ===
Year	Album	Peak positions	Certification
Year	Album	DEN	Certification
2004	Snork City	33	
2006	Det Sorthvide Hotel	29	
2007	Pt.	30	
2012	Noia Noia	–	

=== Singles ===
Promotional singles

- 2004: "Snork City Blues"
- 2004: "Mogens og Karen"
- 2006: "Bad Vibes"

Singles

Year	Single	Peak positions	Album
Year	Single	DEN	Album
2012	"Når månen samler støv"	–	
2014	"Havana"	27	
2022	Kommet for at blive	–	Melodi Grand Prix 2022
