= Fyr og Flamme =

Danish musical duo

- Origin: Denmark
- Genres: Pop
- Years active: 2020–present
- Members: Jesper Groth; Laurits Emanuel

Fyr og Flamme (pronounced [ˈfyɐ̯ˀ ʌ ˈflɑmə]; Danish for 'Fire and Flame') is a Danish music duo consisting of singer Jesper Groth (Flamme) and multi-instrumentalist Laurits Emanuel (Fyr). They represented Denmark in the Eurovision Song Contest 2021 with the song "Øve os på hinanden".

== Group members ==
- Jesper Groth (born 31 January 1989 in Ærøskøbing) is a Danish actor, comedian and singer who graduated from the Statens Teaterskole in 2015. Has played in the series "Klaphat", "Yes no maybe", "Sygeplejeskolen", "Parterapi" og "Sunday". In 2019, he was also nominated for a Robert Awards for supporting male actor of the year for his role in "Klaphat".
- Laurits Emanuel Pedersen Graae (born 12 October 1986 in Tørring) is a Danish musician. In 2013 he released his debut album "Sangbog" as solo artist, and in 2015 came the sequel "Midlertidig mening". In 2014 he formed folk pop/rock group The Grenadines along with Kasper Ejlerskov, Morten Fillipsen and Rumle Sieling Langdal. They released two LP albums "The Grenadines" (2015) and "Band On The Radio" (2018). He left the band 2 May 2021 before they released third album "Everything We Dreamt Of". Alongside his career as a musician, Laurits Emanuel started a family, and in 2019 he moved to Bramming in West Jutland with his wife, Elisabeth, and their two sons, Hannibal and Isak.

== Career ==
Groth and Pedersen met in a "Friday bar" and they have been making music together since 2017. Fyr og Flamme became successful in 2020 with the debut single "Menneskeforbruger", which reached number one on the P3 Listen to Danish chart in September 2020. Their success earned them a recording contract and in the group released their second single "Kamæleon" in December 2020.

10 February 2021 they became a participants of Dansk Melodi Grand Prix (Danish pre-selection for Eurovision) with the song "Øve os på hinanden". The final was held 6 March 2021 in Copenhagen. Fyr og Flamme perform 6th in the running order and advanced for superfinal round with Jean Michel and Chief 1 ft. Thomas Buttenschøn. The duo won the contest with 37% of televotes and earning the right to represent their country at the Eurovision Song Contest 2021 in Rotterdam. This marked the first time since 1997 that Denmark had sent a song completely in Danish to the contest when Kølig Kaj performed "Stemmen i mit liv".

"Øve os på hinanden" entered the Danish "Track Top-40" chart 17 March 2021 as number 1 and stayed in the chart nine weeks in a row. Then two more singles entered the same chart and placed 12 and 7 for "Menneskeforbruger" and "Kamæleon" respectively. The fourth single "Kæreste" released in late April missed to enter the chart.

Fyr og Flamme was drawn to compete in the second semi-final of the contest which took place on 20 May 2021. Performing as the closing entry during the show in position 17, Denmark was not announced among the 10 finalists. It was later revealed that Denmark placed 11th out of the 17 participating countries in the semi-final with 89 points, receiving maximum mark of 12 points from icelandic public only. In split results the song placed 7th in TV voting with 80 points and 15th out of 17 in jury voting with 9 points.

After Eurovision group released their first LP album Fyr og Flamme consist 10 songs consist all four singles. The album starts as number 1 at Danish "Album Top-40" chart 25 August 2021 and stayed in chart for next 4 weeks. At year-end chart "Øve os på hinanden" was placed at 59 position.

Fyr og Flamme track list

No.	Title	Writer(s)	Length
1.	"Hemmelighed"	Laurits Emanuel (m&l)	3:24
2.	"112"	L. Emanuel (m&l), Kasper Daugaard (a)	3:44
3.	"Kamæleon"	L. Emanuel (m&l)	3:10
4.	"Hvor Er Du Nu"	L. Emanuel (m&l)	3:48
5.	"Menneskeforbruger"	L. Emanuel (m&l)	3:40
6.	"Ved Godt Det Var Mig Der Tog Fejl"	L. Emanuel (m&l)	4:14
7.	"Dansemusik"	L. Emanuel (m&l)	3:51
8.	"Kæreste"	L. Emanuel (m&l)	3:24
9.	"Øve os på hinanden"	L. Emanuel (m&l)	3:09
10.	"Dine Øjne"	L. Emanuel (m&l)	4:37
Total length:			37:01

In 2022-2023 Fyr og Flamme is actively touring with releasing new songs. 1 April 2022 they released "Hvem tror du egentlig du er?". Then 1 July new single "Mig der kalder" was released. This song became a part of Danish animated film "Lille Allan - den menneskelige antenne" ("The Little Alien"). The film premiered on 21 July in Denmark. 18 November Fyr og Flamme released their first special Christmas song "Her hos mig" with music video at youtube channel.

6 January 2023 duo's song "Mig der kalder" was nominated for Best Song in Robert Awards. The ceremony took place 4 February at the Tivoli Hotel & Congress Centre in Copenhagen. The song lost to "En drømmer mere" from the film "Esthers orkester". In late 2023 they released two more singles: "Kærlighed og krig" (released 8 September) and second Christmas spetcial "Julekys" (released 10 November). In the end of 2023 they performed the concert "Hjem til Jul" at Lille Vega in Copenhagen on 21 December.

15 April 2024 the duo released their 10th single "Næste lørdag" featuring singer Freja Rebekah and one week later they announce the second album Himmel Og Helvede that released 24 May 2024 with special vinyl version. The album includes 10 songs, including two previously released singles: "Kærlighed og krig" and "Næste lørdag".

Himmel og Helvede track list

No.	Title	Writer(s)	Length
1.	"Spar dame"	Laurits Emanuel (m&l)	3:26
2.	"Fyr og Flamme Løber hjemmefra"	L. Emanuel (m&l)	3:00
3.	"Himmel og helvede"	L. Emanuel (m&l)	2:53
4.	"Næste lørgad"	L. Emanuel (m&l), Rune Borup (m&l)	3:13
5.	"Tusind år"	L. Emanuel (m&l)	3:47
6.	"Kærlighed og krig"	L. Emanuel (m&l)	3:06
7.	"Peter"	L. Emanuel (m&l), Jesper Groth (a)	3:10
8.	"Russisk roulette"	L. Emanuel (m&l), J. Groth (a)	3:10
9.	"Veninder"	L. Emanuel (m&l)	3:12
10.	"Tidevand"	L. Emanuel (m&l)	4:31
Total length:			33:28

== Discography ==
=== Albums ===
Title	Details	Peak chart positions
Title	Details	DEN
Fyr og Flamme	Released: 13 August 2021; Label: Universal; Formats: Digital download, streaming	1
Himmel og Helvede	Released: 24 May 2024; Label: Universal; Formats: Digital download, streaming, vinyl	31

=== Singles ===
List of singles, with selected chart positions
Title	Year	Peak chart positions	Certifications	Album or EP
Title	Year	DEN	Certifications	Album or EP
"Menneskeforbruger"	2020	12	IFPI DEN: Gold	Fyr og Flamme
"Kamæleon"	2020	7	IFPI DEN: Platinum	Fyr og Flamme
"Øve os på hinanden"	2021	1	IFPI DEN: Platinum	Fyr og Flamme
"Kæreste"	2021	—		Fyr og Flamme
"Hvem tror du egentlig du er?"	2022	—		Non-album singles
"Mig der kalder"	2022	—		Non-album singles
"Her hos mig"	2022	—		Non-album singles
"Kærlighed og krig"	2023	—		Himmel Og Helvede
"Julekys"	2023	—		Non-album single
"Næste lørdag" (featuring Freja Rebekah)	2024	—		Himmel Og Helvede
"Velkommen til Kongens port"	2025	—		Non-album singles
"Den allerførste jul uden dig"	2025	—		Non-album singles
"Du danser grimt"	2026	—		Non-album singles
"—" denotes a recording which were not released in that country or did not chart.

=== Music videos ===
No.	Year	Video	Views
1	2020	«Menneskeforbruger» on YouTube	501.000
2	2020	«Kamæleon» on YouTube	1.600.000
3	2021	«Kæreste» on YouTube	203.000
4	2021	«Hemmelighed» on YouTube	101.000
5	2022	«Hvem Tror Du Egentlig Du Er?» on YouTube	54.000
6	2022	«Her Hos Mig» on YouTube	85.000
7	2023	«Julekys» on YouTube	15.000

== Awards and nominations ==
Awards and nominations for Fyr og Flamme
Award	Year	Category	Nominated work	Result
Zulu Awards	2021	New name of the year	Fyr og Flamme	Won
40th Robert Awards	2023	Best Song	"Mig der kalder"	Nominated

Awards and achievements
Preceded by Ben and Tan with "Yes"	Denmark in the Eurovision Song Contest; 2021	Succeeded by Reddi with "The Show"
