= Christian Dalmose =

Danish handball player and coach (born 1968)

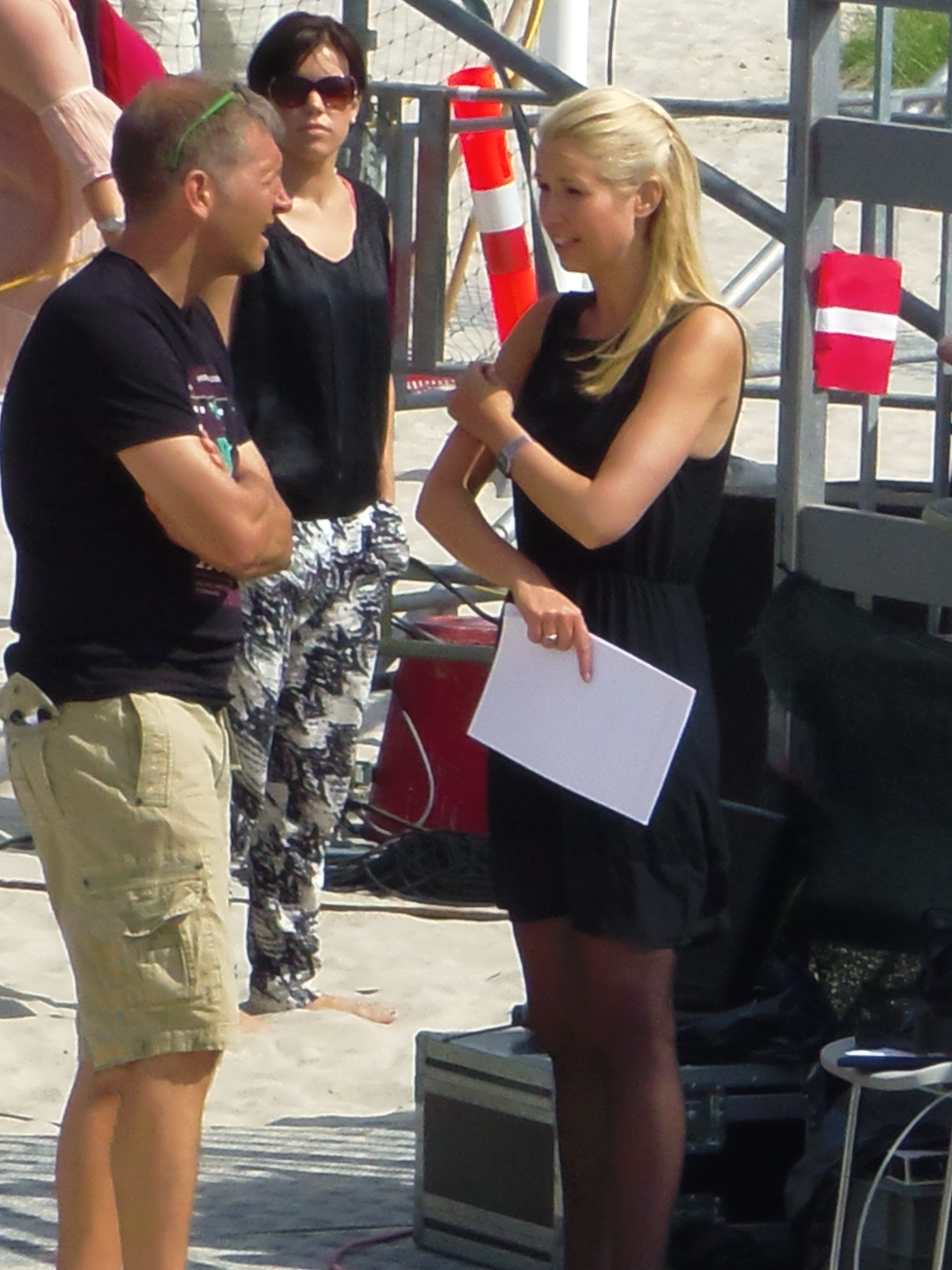
- Dalmose with Tina Müller at the 2013 European Beach Handball Championship

Personal information
- Nationality: Danish
- Born: August 17, 1968 (age 58) Brøndby, Denmark

Sport
- Sport: Handball

Senior clubs
- Years: Team
- –: Ajax København
- –: Virum-Sorgenfri Håndbold
- –: Lyngby

Teams managed
- 1998-2001: Lyngby men
- 2001-2003: Ikast-Bording EH women
- 2004-2007: Aalborg DH women
- 2007-2013: Ajax København men
- 2013-2015: Viborg HK women
- 2015-2016: Siofok KC women
- 2016-2022: TMS Ringsted men

Christian Dalmose (born 1968) is a Danish handball coach and former handball player. His last position was as the head coach for the Danish team TMS Ringsted men's team.

In 2013-14 he became the permanent headcoach of Viborg HK women's team after acting as interim manager at the end of 2012-13 season. The team brought him out of his contract at Vendsyssel Håndbold. He was fired in 2015 after losing five matches in a row.

== Clubs as coach ==
Dalmose has been a coach in these clubs:

- 1998–2001: Lyngby (men)
- 2001–2003: Ikast-Bording EH (women)
- 2004–2007: Aalborg DH (women)
- 2007–2013: Ajax København (men)
- 2013–Feb. 2015: Viborg HK (women)
- Feb. 2015–2016: Siofok KC (women)
- June 2016 – 2022: TMS Ringsted (men)
