= L.I.G.A =

Danish urban pop trio

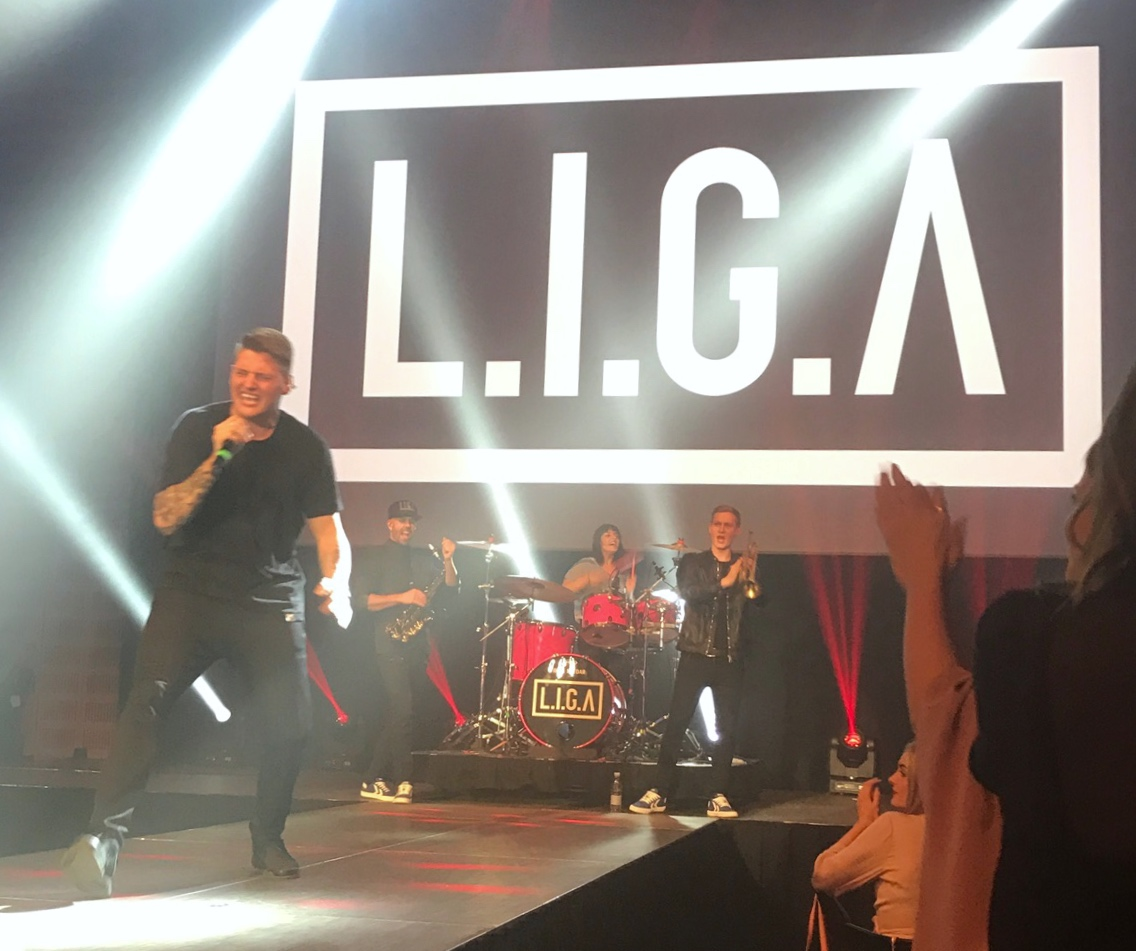
- Danish band L.I.G.A. performs at Danish Beauty Award 2017

Background information
- Origin: Denmark
- Genres: Pop
- Years active: 2012-present
- Labels: RE:A:CH / Universal Music
- Members: Nicky Russell; Feras Agwa (left in 2015); Ihan Haydar

L.I.G.A is a Danish urban pop trio formed in 2012 made up of Nicky Russell, Feras Agwa and Ihan Haydar. They are signed to RE:A:CH (Chief 1 and Remee) and for distribution with Universal Music in Denmark. After Feras Agwa left in 2015, the formation continued as a duo consisting of Nicky Russell and Ihan Haydar.

Russel and Agwa had been writing separately and releasing a lot of tracks through their respective online channels. They shared some tracks together. They presented some of their work to Chief 1, a Danish record producer and songwriter who joined them for a recording session in his studio. Coincidentally, Ihan Haydar was in the studio and volunteered to play drums and the trio was born. Their debut charting hit was "Skylder dig ik' noget". followed by a number of other hits.

== Members ==
- Nicky Russell, frontman of the band, an Australian-Danish singer, songwriter and lead vocalist who writes most of the materials for the band.
- Feras Agwa, (full name Feras El-Sayed Agwa) a rapper from Roskilde of mixed Egyptian-Syrian origins, also known as Sayed the Rapper. He left the band in September 2015.
- Ihan Haydar, drummer and percussionist from Næstved of Iraqi origin. Born in 1993, she was previously a member of Soluna Samay backing band when Samay won Dansk Melodi Grand Prix in 2012 and went on to represent Denmark in the Eurovision Song Contest 2012 in Baku with the Danish entry "Should've Known Better performed by Soluna Samay. Haydar, known with her drumming antiques performed with Samay in Baku in the finals. Haydar later formed the all-female pop-rock band REDDI, which represented Denmark in the Eurovision Song Contest 2022.

== Discography ==
=== Albums ===
Year	Album	Peak positions	Certification
Year	Album	DEN	Certification
2014	L.I.G.A	1	

=== Singles ===
Year	Single	Peak positions	Certification	Album
Year	Single	DEN	Certification	Album
2013	"Skylder dig ik' noget"	8		L.I.G.A.
2013	"Den første gang"	4		L.I.G.A.
2014	"Julia"	5		L.I.G.A.
2014	"Søvnløs"	22		
