= Denmark in the Eurovision Song Contest 2021 =

- Eurovision Song Contest 2021
- Country: Denmark
- Selection process: Dansk Melodi Grand Prix 2021
- Selection date: 6 March 2021

Competing entry
- Song: "Øve os på hinanden"
- Artist: Fyr og Flamme
- Songwriters: Laurits Emanuel

Placement
- Semi-final result: Failed to qualify (11th)

Participation chronology

Denmark was represented at the Eurovision Song Contest 2021 with the song "Øve os på hinanden" written by Laurits Emanuel. The song was performed by the duo Fyr og Flamme. The Danish broadcaster DR organised the national final Dansk Melodi Grand Prix 2021 in order to select the Danish entry for the 2021 contest in Rotterdam, Netherlands. Eight songs competed in a televised show where "Øve os på hinanden" performed by Fyr og Flamme was the winner as decided upon through two rounds of public voting.

Denmark was drawn to compete in the second semi-final of the Eurovision Song Contest which took place on 20 May 2021. Performing as the closing entry during the show in position 17, "Øve os på hinanden" was not announced among the top 10 entries of the second semi-final and therefore did not qualify to compete in the final. It was later revealed that Denmark placed eleventh out of the 17 participating countries in the semi-final with 89 points.

== Background ==
Prior to the 2021 contest, Denmark had participated in the Eurovision Song Contest forty-eight times since their first entry in 1957. Denmark had won the contest, to this point, on three occasions: in 1963 with the song "Dansevise" performed by Grethe and Jørgen Ingmann, in 2000 with the song "Fly on the Wings of Love" performed by Olsen Brothers, and in 2013 with the song "Only Teardrops" performed by Emmelie de Forest. In the 2019 contest, "Love Is Forever" performed by Leonora qualified Denmark to the final, where it placed twelfth. In 2020, Ben and Tan were set to represent the country with the song "Yes" before the contest's cancellation.

The Danish national broadcaster, DR, broadcasts the event within Denmark and organises the selection process for the nation's entry. DR confirmed their intentions to participate at the 2020 Eurovision Song Contest on 3 April 2020. Denmark has selected all of their Eurovision entries thus far through the national final Dansk Melodi Grand Prix. Along with their participation confirmation, the broadcaster announced that Dansk Melodi Grand Prix 2021 would be organised in order to select Denmark's entry for the 2021 contest.

== Before Eurovision ==
=== Dansk Melodi Grand Prix 2021 ===
Dansk Melodi Grand Prix 2021 was the 51st edition of Dansk Melodi Grand Prix, the music competition that selects Denmark's entries for the Eurovision Song Contest. The event was held on 6 March 2021 at the DR Studio 5 in Copenhagen, hosted by Tina Müller and Martin Brygmann and televised on DR1 as well as streamed online at DRTV. The national final was watched by 1.532 million viewers in Denmark, making it the most watched edition of Dansk Melodi Grand Prix since 2016.

==== Format ====
Eight songs competed in one show where the winner was determined over two rounds of public voting. In the first round, the top three songs qualified to the superfinal, during which the winner was determined. Viewers were able to vote via SMS or a mobile application specifically designed for the competition. Viewers using the app to cast a vote were provided with one free vote. The DR Grand Prix Orchestra conducted by Peter Düring also accompanied each performance in varying capacities during the show.

==== Competing entries ====
DR opened a submission period between 29 October 2020 and 20 November 2020 for artists and composers to submit their entries. The spokesperson for the Dansk Melodi Grand Prix, Gustav Lützhøft, stated that the competition would seek out "songs that reflect Danish culture and identity with a diversity of both genres and musical expressions" with emphasis on songs that have the potential for further success after the competition. A selection committee of industry professionals selected eight songs from the entries submitted to the broadcaster. The competing artists and songs were announced and officially presented during the DR radio programmes P3 Buffeten, Formiddag på 4'eren and P4 Play. Among the competing artists was Mike Tramp who represented Denmark in the Eurovision Song Contest 1978 as part of the band Mabel.

Artist	Song	Songwriter(s)
Chief 1 and Thomas Buttenschøn	"Højt over skyerne"	Lars "Chief 1" Pedersen, Thomas Buttenschøn, Nermin Harambasic
Claudia Campagnol	"Abracadabra"	Melanie Wehbe, Emil Lei, Louis Jarto
Emma Nicoline	"Står lige her"	Jeppe Pilgaard, Jacob Jørgensen, Emma Nicoline Winther Nielsen, Adam Kalwa, Patricia Namakula Mbabazi
Fyr og Flamme	"Øve os på hinanden"	Laurits Emanuel Pedersen
Jean Michel	"Beautiful"	Clara Sofie Fabricius, Johannes Nymark, Jesper Hjersing Sidelmann, Andreas Jensen
Mike Tramp	"Everything Is Alright"	Michael Trempenau
Nanna Olivia	"Hvileløse hjerter"	Anna David, Nicolai Levring, Casper Sørensen
The Cosmic Twins	"Silver Bullet"	Lise Cabble, Gisli Gislason, Rasmus Duelund, August Emil

==== Final ====
The final took place on 6 March 2021. The running order was determined by DR and announced on 25 February 2021. In the first round of voting the top three advanced to a superfinal based on a public vote. In the superfinal, the winner, "Øve os på hinanden" performed by Fyr og Flamme, was selected solely by the public vote. In addition to the performances of the competing entries, Andreas Odbjerg performed the Danish Eurovision 1995 entry "Fra Mols til Skagen" as the interval act.

Final – 6 March 2021
R/O	Artist	Song	Result
1	Chief 1 and Thomas Buttenschøn	"Højt over skyerne"	Advanced
2	Nanna Olivia	"Hvileløse hjerter"	—N/a
3	The Cosmic Twins	"Silver Bullet"	—N/a
4	Claudia Campagnol	"Abracadabra"	—N/a
5	Mike Tramp	"Everything Is Alright"	—N/a
6	Fyr og Flamme	"Øve os på hinanden"	Advanced
7	Emma Nicoline	"Står lige her"	—N/a
8	Jean Michel	"Beautiful"	Advanced

Superfinal – 6 March 2021
R/O	Artist	Song	Televote	Place
1	Fyr og Flamme	"Øve os på hinanden"	37%	1
2	Chief 1 and Thomas Buttenschøn	"Højt over skyerne"	29%	3
3	Jean Michel	"Beautiful"	34%	2

== At Eurovision ==
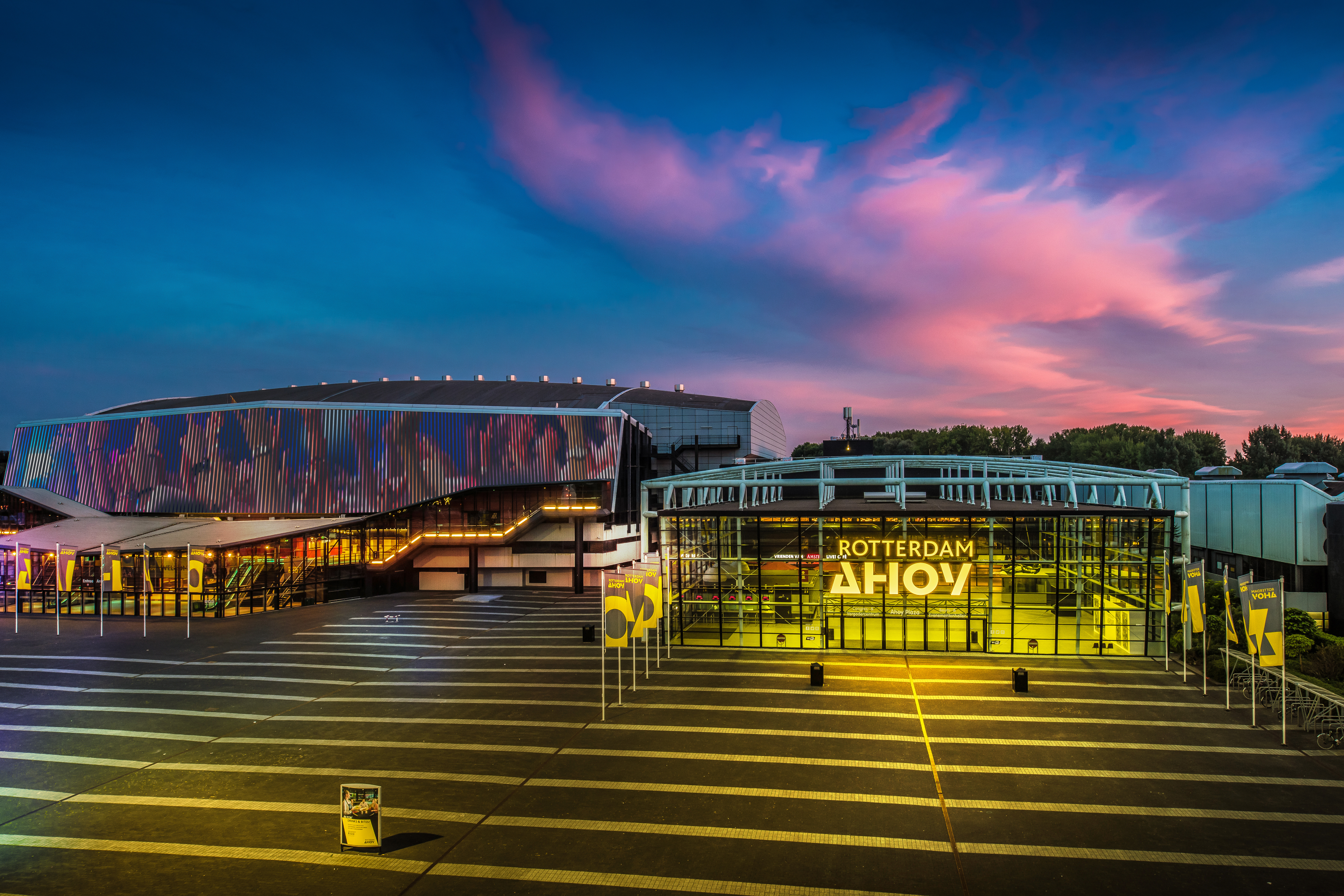
The Eurovision Song Contest 2021 took place at the Rotterdam Ahoy in Rotterdam, Netherlands

According to Eurovision rules, all nations with the exceptions of the host country and the "Big Five" (France, Germany, Italy, Spain, and the United Kingdom) are required to qualify from one of two semi-finals in order to compete in the final; the top ten countries from each semi-final progress to the final. The European Broadcasting Union (EBU) split up the competing countries into six different pots based on voting patterns from previous contests, with countries with favourable voting histories put into the same pot. The semi-final allocation draw held for the Eurovision Song Contest 2020 on 28 January 2020 was used for the 2021 contest, which Denmark was placed into the second semi-final, to be held on 20 May 2021, and was scheduled to perform in the second half of the show.

Once all the competing songs for the 2021 contest had been released, the running order for the semi-finals was decided by the shows' producers rather than through another draw, so that similar songs were not placed next to each other. Denmark was set to perform last in position, following the entry from Switzerland.

The two semi-finals and final were broadcast on DR1 with commentary by Henrik Milling and Nicolai Molbech. The Danish spokesperson, who announced the top 12-point score awarded by the Danish jury during the final, was Tina Müller.

=== Semi-final ===
Fyr og Flamme took part in technical rehearsals on 11 and 14 May, followed by dress rehearsals on 19 and 20 May. This included the jury show on 19 May where the professional juries of each country watched and voted on the competing entries.

The Danish performance featured the members of Fyr og Flamme dressed in 80s inspired outfits and performing with three backing vocalists. The performance began with the duo on two circular platforms, which lead singer Jesper Groth later left jumped off towards the satellite stage and finished the performance back onto his platform with pyrotechnic effects. The stage colours were predominantly pink and light blue and the LED screens displayed squares and lines of the same colours. The three backing vocalists that joined Fyr og Flamme were: Line Krogholm, Marcel Gbekle and Tilde Vinther.

At the end of the show, Denmark was not announced among the top 10 entries in the second semi-final and therefore failed to qualify to compete in the final. It was later revealed that Denmark placed eleventh in the semi-final, receiving a total of 89 points: 80 points from the televoting and 9 points from the juries.

=== Voting ===
Voting during the three shows involved each country awarding two sets of points from 1-8, 10, and 12: one from their professional jury and the other from televoting. Each nation's jury consisted of five music industry professionals who are citizens of the country they represent, with a diversity in gender and age represented. The judges assess each entry based on the performances during the second Dress Rehearsal of each show, which takes place the night before each live show, against a set of criteria including vocal capacity; the stage performance; the song's composition and originality; and the overall impression by the act. Jury members may only take part in the panel once every three years and are obliged to confirm that they are not connected to any of the participating acts in a way that would impact their ability to vote impartially. Jury members should also vote independently, with no discussion of their vote permitted with other jury members. The exact composition of the professional jury, and the results of each country's jury and televoting were released after the grand final; the individual results from each jury member were also released in an anonymised form.

Below is a breakdown of points awarded to Denmark and awarded by Denmark in the second semi-final and grand final of the contest, and the breakdown of the jury voting and televoting conducted during the two shows:

==== Points awarded to Denmark ====
Points awarded to Denmark (Semi-final 2)
Score	Televote	Jury
12 points	Iceland	
10 points		
8 points	Estonia; Finland	
7 points		
6 points	Poland	
5 points	Spain; Switzerland; United Kingdom	
4 points	France; Georgia; Latvia; Portugal	Austria
3 points	Austria; Bulgaria; Czech Republic	Czech Republic
2 points	Albania; Serbia	
1 point	Greece; San Marino	Finland; Iceland

==== Points awarded by Denmark ====
Points awarded by Denmark (Semi-final 2)
Score	Televote	Jury
12 points	Iceland	Switzerland
10 points	Finland	Albania
8 points	Portugal	Iceland
7 points	Switzerland	Finland
6 points	Estonia	Bulgaria
5 points	Bulgaria	San Marino
4 points	Austria	Portugal
3 points	Greece	Austria
2 points	San Marino	Greece
1 point	Georgia	Poland

Points awarded by Denmark (Final)
Score	Televote	Jury
12 points	Iceland	Switzerland
10 points	Sweden	Iceland
8 points	Norway	Finland
7 points	Finland	Albania
6 points	Switzerland	Bulgaria
5 points	Italy	San Marino
4 points	Lithuania	Malta
3 points	France	Norway
2 points	Malta	Sweden
1 point	Ukraine	Israel

==== Detailed voting results ====
The following members comprised the Danish jury:

- Julie Aagaard (Kill J)
- Tanne Amanda Balcells
- Lise Cabble
- Peter Düring
- Jonas Schroeder

Detailed voting results from Denmark (Semi-final 2)
R/O	Country	Jury							Televote	
R/O	Country	Juror A	Juror B	Juror C	Juror D	Juror E	Rank	Points	Rank	Points
01	San Marino	2	7	5	11	4	6	5	9	2
02	Estonia	11	11	13	9	12	14		5	6
03	Czech Republic	13	13	6	8	8	11		16	
04	Greece	14	12	3	12	9	9	2	8	3
05	Austria	3	6	16	7	13	8	3	7	4
06	Poland	12	10	7	14	5	10	1	12	
07	Moldova	15	14	12	5	10	12		13	
08	Iceland	5	2	2	10	6	3	8	1	12
09	Serbia	8	9	8	15	14	13		11	
10	Georgia	16	16	14	6	16	15		10	1
11	Albania	1	8	4	13	2	2	10	14	
12	Portugal	7	3	11	4	15	7	4	3	8
13	Bulgaria	10	5	10	2	3	5	6	6	5
14	Finland	4	4	9	3	7	4	7	2	10
15	Latvia	9	15	15	16	11	16		15	
16	Switzerland	6	1	1	1	1	1	12	4	7
17	Denmark									

Detailed voting results from Denmark (Final)
R/O	Country	Jury							Televote	
R/O	Country	Juror A	Juror B	Juror C	Juror D	Juror E	Rank	Points	Rank	Points
01	Cyprus	7	10	7	13	12	13		13	
02	Albania	1	16	11	21	2	4	7	25	
03	Israel	20	18	2	9	25	10	1	21	
04	Belgium	24	17	21	19	9	23		16	
05	Russia	17	4	22	25	26	17		12	
06	Malta	15	3	5	16	14	7	4	9	2
07	Portugal	14	8	18	7	24	16		11	
08	Serbia	9	22	16	24	18	22		23	
09	United Kingdom	19	12	25	11	15	21		22	
10	Greece	18	21	3	20	8	14		15	
11	Switzerland	5	1	1	4	1	1	12	5	6
12	Iceland	3	2	4	8	11	2	10	1	12
13	Spain	22	11	10	23	5	15		26	
14	Moldova	11	26	15	10	13	19		24	
15	Germany	13	25	26	26	22	26		14	
16	Finland	8	5	14	3	4	3	8	4	7
17	Bulgaria	16	9	20	2	3	5	6	18	
18	Lithuania	21	19	13	18	16	25		7	4
19	Ukraine	26	24	17	1	19	11		10	1
20	France	10	7	19	14	23	18		8	3
21	Azerbaijan	12	23	9	12	21	20		17	
22	Norway	25	20	6	5	7	8	3	3	8
23	Netherlands	4	6	24	15	17	12		19	
24	Italy	23	14	23	22	10	24		6	5
25	Sweden	6	15	8	6	20	9	2	2	10
26	San Marino	2	13	12	17	6	6	5	20	
