= Tina Müller =

Danish television presenter

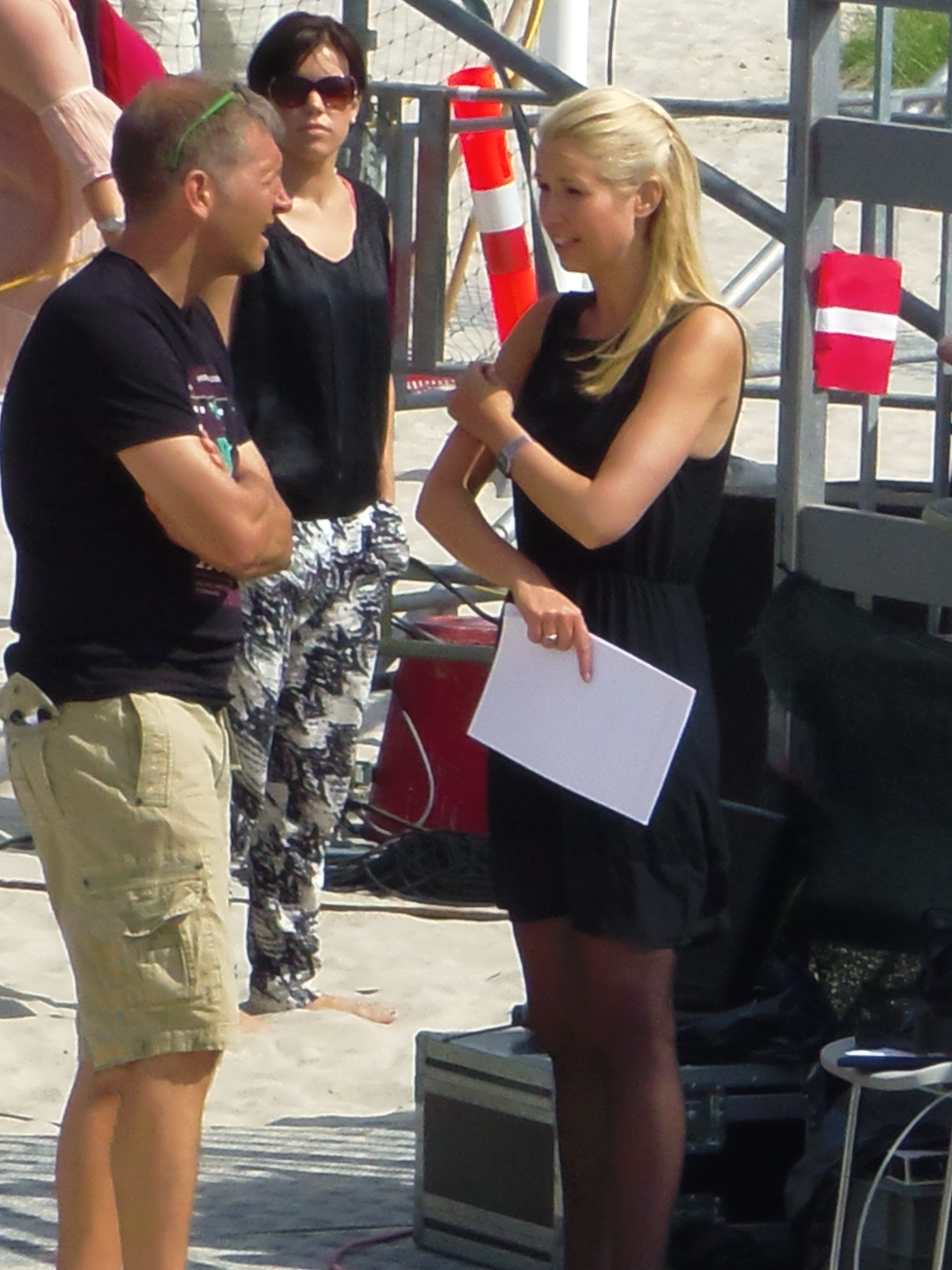
- Tina Müller with Christian Dalmose at the 2013 European Beach Handball Championship
- Born: 1 December 1977 (age 48)
- Occupations: Sports journal, television and radio presenter

Tina Müller (born 1 December 1977 in Ringsted) is a Danish sports journalist and television presenter who hosted the Dansk Melodi Grand Prix 2021 and the 2022 edition, both on DR1. She was the spokesperson for Denmark's jury votes in the final of the Eurovision Song Contest 2021, 2022, and again in 2023.

She is also the usual presenter when Danmarks Radio shows handball matches.
