= Øve os på hinanden =

2021 song by Fyr & Flamme

Single by Fyr & Flamme

from the album Fyr & Flamme
- Released: 10 February 2021
- Genre: Electropop
- Length: 3:06
- Label: Universal Music Denmark
- Songwriter: Laurits Emanuel Pedersen
- Producers: Laurits Emanuel Pedersen; Rune Borup

Fyr & Flamme singles chronology
"Kamæleon" (2020)	"Øve os på hinanden" (2021)	"Kæreste" (2021)

Music video
- "Øve os på hinanden" on YouTube

Eurovision Song Contest 2021 entry
- Country: Denmark
- Artist: Fyr & Flamme
- Language: Danish
- Composer: Laurits Emanuel Pedersen
- Lyricist: Laurits Emanuel Pedersen

Finals performance
- Semi-final result: 11th
- Semi-final points: 89

Entry chronology
- ◄ "Yes" (2020)
- "The Show" (2022) ►

"Øve os på hinanden" (pronounced [ˈøːvə ʌs pʰɔ hiˈnænn̩]; lit. "Practice on each other" [1st. p. pl.]) is a song by Danish music duo Fyr & Flamme that represented Denmark in the Eurovision Song Contest 2021 in Rotterdam. It is the first time since 1997 that a song sung entirely in Danish represented the country at Eurovision. The song topped the Danish singles chart, being the first Danish Eurovision entry to do so since "Only Teardrops" in 2013.

== Eurovision Song Contest ==
The song was selected to represent Denmark in the Eurovision Song Contest 2021, after winning Dansk Melodi Grand Prix, the music competition that selects Denmark's entries for the Eurovision Song Contest. The semi-finals of the 2021 contest featured the same line-up of countries as determined by the draw for the 2020 contest's semi-finals. Denmark was placed into the second semi-final, held on 20 May 2021, and performed in the second half of the show. They failed to progress to the final of the contest.

== Charts ==
=== Weekly charts ===
Weekly chart performance for "Øve os på hinanden"
Chart (2021)	Peak position
Denmark (Tracklisten)	1

=== Year-end charts ===
Year-end chart performance for "Øve os på hinanden"
Chart (2021)	Position
Denmark (Tracklisten)	59

== Certifications ==
Region	Certification	Certified units/sales
Denmark (IFPI Danmark)	Platinum	90,000^{‡}
^{‡} Sales+streaming figures based on certification alone.
