= Germany in the Eurovision Song Contest =

- Eurovision Song Contest
- Participating broadcaster: ARD – Südwestrundfunk (SWR; since 2026) Formerly: ARD members: Nord- und Westdeutscher Rundfunkverband (NWRV; 1956); Hessischer Rundfunk (HR; 1957, 1959–1961, 1963–1964, 1966–1971, 1973–1977); Westdeutscher Rundfunk (WDR; 1958); Südwestfunk (SWF; 1962, 1978); Norddeutscher Rundfunk (NDR; 1965, 1996–2025); Sender Freies Berlin (SFB; 1972, 1991); Bayerischer Rundfunk (BR; 1979–1990); Mitteldeutscher Rundfunk (MDR; 1992–1995)

Participation summary
- Appearances: 69
- First appearance: 1956
- Highest placement: 1st: 1982, 2010
- Host: 1957, 1983, 2011
- Participation history: 1956; 1957; 1958; 1959; 1960; 1961; 1962; 1963; 1964; 1965; 1966; 1967; 1968; 1969; 1970; 1971; 1972; 1973; 1974; 1975; 1976; 1977; 1978; 1979; 1980; 1981; 1982; 1983; 1984; 1985; 1986; 1987; 1988; 1989; 1990; 1991; 1992; 1993; 1994; 1995; ~~1996~~; 1997; 1998; 1999; 2000; 2001; 2002; 2003; 2004; 2005; 2006; 2007; 2008; 2009; 2010; 2011; 2012; 2013; 2014; 2015; 2016; 2017; 2018; 2019; ~~2020~~; 2021; 2022; 2023; 2024; 2025; 2026

External links
- NDR page
- Germany's page at Eurovision.com
- For the most recent participation see Germany in the Eurovision Song Contest 2026

Germany has been represented at every Eurovision Song Contest since its inaugural edition in 1956, except in 1996 when its entry did not qualify past the audio-only pre-selection round, and consequently did not enter the final and does not count as one of its 69 appearances. No other country has been represented as many times. Along with France, Italy, Spain, and the United Kingdom, Germany is one of the "Big Five" countries that are automatically prequalified for the final, due to their participating broadcasters being the largest financial contributors to the European Broadcasting Union (EBU). The German participating broadcaster in the contest is ARD, which has delegated its participation to different members of the consortium over the years.

Germany first won the contest in 1982 with "Ein bißchen Frieden" performed by Nicole. The second German victory came 28 years later at the 2010 contest, when "Satellite" performed by Lena won. Katja Ebstein, who finished third in 1970 and 1971, then second in 1980, is the only performer to have made the top three on three occasions. Germany has a total of 11 top three placements, also finishing second with Lena Valaitis (1981) and twice with the group Wind (1985 and 1987), and finishing third with Mary Roos (1972), Mekado (1994) and Sürpriz (1999). Germany has finished last on nine occasions, receiving nul points in 1964, 1965 and 2015.

While having not reached the top ten in 16 of the last 21 contests (2005–2026), Michael Schulte achieved Germany's second-best result of the 21st century, by finishing fourth in 2018. Although German contestants have had varied levels of success, public interest remains high and the contest is one of the most-watched events each year.

== History ==
The Federal Republic of Germany has participated in the contest since its inception in 1956. Before German reunification in 1990, the country was occasionally presented as "West Germany". The German Democratic Republic (East Germany) did not participate in the Eurovision Song Contest, and instead took part in the Intervision Song Contest.

With one win (1982) and four second-place results (1980, 1981, 1985, and 1987), Germany was the second most successful country in the contest in the 1980s, behind Ireland, who had two wins in the decade.

=== 1996 absence ===
ARD had selected an artist and song to represent them at the 1996 contest, to be held in Oslo, Norway. Due to the large number of countries wanting to compete at Eurovision, the EBU determined that only 23 of the 30 countries could compete. Hosts Norway qualified automatically, the other 29 songs went into an audio-only pre-qualification round, with the top 22 going on to compete alongside Norway in Oslo. Unfortunately for Germany, its entry, Leon with "Planet of Blue", failed to earn enough points to progress to the final, finishing 24th. ARD and the EBU were not happy with this, as Germany was the biggest financial contributor at the time. This is the only time that Germany has been absent from the contest.

=== 2000s ===
In the 2000s, Germany has been notable for their adoption of musical styles which are not typical of Eurovision, such as country and western (Texas Lightning – "No No Never" in 2006) and swing (Roger Cicero – "Frauen regier'n die Welt" in 2007 and Alex Swings Oscar Sings – "Miss Kiss Kiss Bang" in 2009). Germany had some successes throughout the decade, Lou - "Let's Get Happy" came in 11th place out of 26 in 2003 and Stefan Raab came 5th in 2000, which was Germany's best placement during the 2000s. Germany tied for last in 2008 for points, but was awarded 23rd of 25 places when the results were posted. In 2009, ARD held an internal selection for the first time since 1995 due to lack of interest and viewing figures of the German national finals. Alex Christensen and Oscar Loya were selected to represent Germany at the 2009 contest, where they performed on stage with burlesque artist Dita Von Teese. However they only managed to receive 35 points, placing 20th of 25 competing countries.

=== 2010s ===
In 2010, ARD approached former entrant and songwriter Stefan Raab and private network ProSieben to co-operate in finding a winning entry for the country. It has been said that Raab was approached due to his good record at the contest, finishing 5th in 2000 as well as writing entries in 1998 and 2004, which finished 7th and 8th, respectively. Raab agreed and conducted a TV casting show called Unser Star für Oslo which was broadcast on ARD and ProSieben. A winner arose in Lena Meyer-Landrut with "Satellite", who went on to win the contest. Two further collaborations with ProSieben provided the second and third top ten result in a row respectively in 2011 (Lena, who returned to defend her title with "Taken by a Stranger") and 2012 (Roman Lob with "Standing Still").

The streak of top 10 finishes was broken in the 2013 contest, when Cascada's song "Glorious" finished 21st with 18 points. The group Elaiza in 2014, Ann Sophie in 2015, Jamie-Lee in 2016 and Levina in 2017 finished in 18th, 27th (last), 26th (last) and 25th (second to last) place respectively. Ann Sophie became the country's third entry to finish with nul points, after Nora Nova in 1964 and Ulla Wiesner in 1965, and the first since the introduction of the current scoring system in 1975.

Germany's luck changed in 2018, when Michael Schulte brought them back to the top 5 for the first time since 2010 with "You Let Me Walk Alone", finishing in fourth place. This is the first time since 2012 that more than one country from the "Big Five" has made the top ten (with Italy finishing fifth) and the second time (after 2002) that two "Big Five" countries have made the top five since the establishment of the rule. The year after, the duo Sisters with the song "Sister" was not able to replicate the same success, receiving no points from the televote and finishing in 25th place with 24 points.

=== 2020s ===
Three further bottom five results were recorded by Germany at the start of the decade, that of Jendrik in 2021 (also receiving no points from the televote), Malik Harris in 2022 (receiving no points from the juries) and Lord of the Lost in 2023. This streak was broken by Isaak, whose entry "Always on the Run" placed 12th in 2024 with 117 points, and Abor & Tynna, whose entry "Baller" placed 15th with 151 points in 2025. Another bottom 5 result was recorded in 2026 with Sarah Engels and her song Fire.

== Organisation ==
Germany's participation in the contest has changed hands between members of ARD, the consortium of the country's regional public broadcasters, with Südwestrundfunk (SWR) responsible for organising the country's entry since 2026. Other ARD members which have been delegated responsibility over the German entry in previous years include:

- Nord-und Westdeutscher Rundfunkverband (NWRV) – 1956
- Hessischer Rundfunk (HR) – 1957, 1959–1961, 1963–1964, 1966–1971, 1973–1977
- Westdeutscher Rundfunk (WDR) – 1958
- Südwestfunk (SWF) – 1962, 1978
- Norddeutscher Rundfunk (NDR) – 1965, 1996–2025
- Sender Freies Berlin (SFB) – 1972, 1991
- Bayerischer Rundfunk (BR) – 1979–1990
- Mitteldeutscher Rundfunk (MDR) – 1992–1995

In 1991, SFB worked in partnership with the East German broadcaster Deutscher Fernsehfunk (DFF) to select the German entry for that year's contest. Between 2010 and 2012, private broadcaster ProSieben worked in partnership with NDR. In 2025, RTL Deutschland partnered with NDR.

The process to select the German entry in the contest has changed over the years, with both national finals and internal selections (occasionally a combination of both formats) having been held.

== Germany and the "Big" countries ==
Since 1999, Germany, along with France, Spain and the United Kingdom, have automatically qualified for the Eurovision final regardless of their results in previous contests. The participating broadcasters from these countries earned this special status by being the four biggest financial contributors to the EBU, and subsequently became known as the "Big Four". In 2008, it was reported that the "Big Four" could lose their status and be forced to compete in the semi-finals; however, this never materialised, and the rule remained in place. When Italy returned to the contest in 2011, it was given the same status, resulting in the countries becoming members of a "Big Five".

Germany was the first Big Five country to win the contest after the rule was introduced, courtesy of Lena in 2010. In terms of success, it is currently second behind Italy, which won in 2021 with Måneskin, and finished second in 2011 with Raphael Gualazzi and again in 2019 with Mahmood. However, taking into account Italy's absence from the contest for the first 11 years of the rule's existence, Germany remains the only country to have won out of the original "Big Four".

== Participation overview ==
Table key
| 1 | First place |
| 2 | Second place |
| 3 | Third place |
| ◁ | Last place |
| ◇ | Entry selected but did not compete |
| † | Upcoming event |

| Year | Artist | Song | Language | Final | Points | Semi | Points |
|---|---|---|---|---|---|---|---|
| 1956 | Walter Andreas Schwarz | "Im Wartesaal zum großen Glück" | German | —N/a (Note: The 1956 contest had secret voting and, apart from the winner, no results were released.) | —N/a | No semi-finals | |
| 1956 | Freddy Quinn | "So geht das jede Nacht" | German | —N/a | —N/a | No semi-finals | |
| 1957 | Margot Hielscher | "Telefon, Telefon" | German | 4 | 8 | No semi-finals | |
| 1958 | Margot Hielscher | "Für zwei Groschen Musik" | German | 7 | 5 | No semi-finals | |
| 1959 | Alice and Ellen Kessler | "Heut' woll'n wir tanzen geh'n" | German | 8 | 5 | No semi-finals | |
| 1960 | Wyn Hoop | "Bonne nuit ma chérie" | German | 4 | 11 | No semi-finals | |
| 1961 | Lale Andersen | "Einmal sehen wir uns wieder" | German, French | 13 | 3 | No semi-finals | |
| 1962 | Conny Froboess | "Zwei kleine Italiener" | German | 6 | 9 | No semi-finals | |
| 1963 | Heidi Brühl | "Marcel" | German | 9 | 5 | No semi-finals | |
| 1964 | Nora Nova | "Man gewöhnt sich so schnell an das Schöne" | German | 13 ◁ | 0 | No semi-finals | |
| 1965 | Ulla Wiesner | "Paradies, wo bist du?" | German | 15 ◁ | 0 | No semi-finals | |
| 1966 | Margot Eskens | "Die Zeiger der Uhr" | German | 10 | 7 | No semi-finals | |
| 1967 | Inge Brück | "Anouschka" | German | 8 | 7 | No semi-finals | |
| 1968 | Wencke Myhre | "Ein Hoch der Liebe" | German | 6 | 11 | No semi-finals | |
| 1969 | Siw Malmkvist | "Primaballerina" | German | 9 | 8 | No semi-finals | |
| 1970 | Katja Ebstein | "Wunder gibt es immer wieder" | German | 3 | 12 | No semi-finals | |
| 1971 | Katja Ebstein | "Diese Welt" | German | 3 | 100 | No semi-finals | |
| 1972 | Mary Roos | "Nur die Liebe läßt uns leben" | German | 3 | 107 | No semi-finals | |
| 1973 | Gitte | "Junger Tag" | German | 8 | 85 | No semi-finals | |
| 1974 | Cindy and Bert | "Die Sommermelodie" | German | 14 ◁ | 3 | No semi-finals | |
| 1975 | Joy Fleming | "Ein Lied kann eine Brücke sein" | German, English | 17 | 15 | No semi-finals | |
| 1976 | Les Humphries Singers | "Sing, Sang, Song" | German | 15 | 12 | No semi-finals | |
| 1977 | Silver Convention | "Telegram" | English | 8 | 55 | No semi-finals | |
| 1978 | Ireen Sheer | "Feuer" | German | 6 | 84 | No semi-finals | |
| 1979 | Dschinghis Khan | "Dschinghis Khan" | German | 4 | 86 | No semi-finals | |
| 1980 | Katja Ebstein | "Theater" | German | 2 | 128 | No semi-finals | |
| 1981 | Lena Valaitis | "Johnny Blue" | German | 2 | 132 | No semi-finals | |
| 1982 | Nicole | "Ein bißchen Frieden" | German | 1 | 161 | No semi-finals | |
| 1983 | Hoffmann & Hoffmann | "Rücksicht" | German | 5 | 94 | No semi-finals | |
| 1984 | Mary Roos | "Aufrecht geh'n" | German | 13 | 34 | No semi-finals | |
| 1985 | Wind | "Für alle" | German | 2 | 105 | No semi-finals | |
| 1986 | Ingrid Peters | "Über die Brücke geh'n" | German | 8 | 62 | No semi-finals | |
| 1987 | Wind | "Laß die Sonne in dein Herz" | German | 2 | 141 | No semi-finals | |
| 1988 | Maxi and Chris Garden | "Lied für einen Freund" | German | 14 | 48 | No semi-finals | |
| 1989 | Nino de Angelo | "Flieger" | German | 14 | 46 | No semi-finals | |
| 1990 | Chris Kempers and Daniel Kovac | "Frei zu leben" | German | 9 | 60 | No semi-finals | |
| 1991 | Atlantis 2000 | "Dieser Traum darf niemals sterben" | German | 18 | 10 | No semi-finals | |
| 1992 | Wind | "Träume sind für alle da" | German | 16 | 27 | No semi-finals | |
| 1993 | Münchener Freiheit | "Viel zu weit" | German | 18 | 18 | Kvalifikacija za Millstreet | |
| 1994 | Mekado | "Wir geben 'ne Party" | German | 3 | 128 | No semi-finals | |
| 1995 | Stone and Stone | "Verliebt in Dich" | German | 23 ◁ | 1 | No semi-finals | |
| 1996 | Leon ◇ | "Planet of Blue" ◇ | German ◇ | Failed to qualify (Note: In order to reduce the number of participating countries at the 1996 event a qualifying round was held among all countries except the hosts. Germany failed to progress from this round; entries which failed to progress have subsequently been discounted by the EBU and do not feature as part of the countries' list of appearances.) | | 24 | 24 |
| 1997 | Bianca Shomburg | "Zeit" | German | 18 | 22 | No semi-finals | |
| 1998 | Guildo Horn | "Guildo hat euch lieb" | German | 7 | 86 | No semi-finals | |
| 1999 | Sürpriz | "Journey to Jerusalem – Kudüs'e Seyahat" | German, Turkish, English | 3 | 140 | No semi-finals | |
| 2000 | Stefan Raab | "Wadde hadde dudde da?" | German, English | 5 | 96 | No semi-finals | |
| 2001 | Michelle | "Wer Liebe lebt" | German, English | 8 | 66 | No semi-finals | |
| 2002 | Corinna May | "I Can't Live Without Music" | English | 21 | 17 | No semi-finals | |
| 2003 | Lou | "Let's Get Happy" | English | 11 | 53 | No semi-finals | |
| 2004 | Max | "Can't Wait Until Tonight" | English, Turkish | 8 | 93 | Member of the "Big Four" | |
| 2005 | Gracia | "Run & Hide" | English | 24 ◁ | 4 | Member of the "Big Four" | |
| 2006 | Texas Lightning | "No No Never" | English | 14 | 36 | Member of the "Big Four" | |
| 2007 | Roger Cicero | "Frauen regier'n die Welt" | German, English | 19 | 49 | Member of the "Big Four" | |
| 2008 | No Angels | "Disappear" | English | 23 | 14 | Member of the "Big Four" | |
| 2009 | Alex Swings Oscar Sings! | "Miss Kiss Kiss Bang" | English | 20 | 35 | Member of the "Big Four" | |
| 2010 | Lena | "Satellite" | English | 1 | 246 | Member of the "Big Four" | |
| 2011 | Lena | "Taken by a Stranger" | English | 10 | 107 | Member of the "Big Five"; Host country | |
| 2012 | Roman Lob | "Standing Still" | English | 8 | 110 | Member of the "Big Five" | |
| 2013 | Cascada | "Glorious" | English | 21 | 18 | Member of the "Big Five" | |
| 2014 | Elaiza | "Is It Right" | English | 18 | 39 | Member of the "Big Five" | |
| 2015 | Ann Sophie | "Black Smoke" | English | 27 ◁ | 0 | Member of the "Big Five" | |
| 2016 | Jamie-Lee | "Ghost" | English | 26 ◁ | 11 | Member of the "Big Five" | |
| 2017 | Levina | "Perfect Life" | English | 25 | 6 | Member of the "Big Five" | |
| 2018 | Michael Schulte | "You Let Me Walk Alone" | English | 4 | 340 | Member of the "Big Five" | |
| 2019 | S!sters | "Sister" | English | 25 | 24 | Member of the "Big Five" | |
| 2020 | Ben Dolic ◇ | "Violent Thing" ◇ | English ◇ | Contest cancelled (Note: The 2020 contest was cancelled due to the COVID-19 pandemic.) | | Member of the "Big Five" | |
| 2021 | Jendrik | "I Don't Feel Hate" | English | 25 | 3 | Member of the "Big Five" | |
| 2022 | Malik Harris | "Rockstars" | English | 25 ◁ | 6 | Member of the "Big Five" | |
| 2023 | Lord of the Lost | "Blood & Glitter" | English | 26 ◁ | 18 | Member of the "Big Five" | |
| 2024 | Isaak | "Always on the Run" | English | 12 | 117 | Member of the "Big Five" | |
| 2025 | Abor & Tynna | "Baller" | German, English | 15 | 151 | Member of the "Big Five" | |
| 2026 | Sarah Engels | "Fire" | English | 23 | 12 | Member of the "Big Four" | |
| 2027 | Confirmed intention to participate † | | | | | | |

=== Congratulations: 50 Years of the Eurovision Song Contest ===
| Artist | Song | Language | At Congratulations | | | | At Eurovision | | |
| Artist | Song | Language | Final | Points | Semi | Points | Year | Place | Points |
|---|---|---|---|---|---|---|---|---|---|
| Nicole | "Ein bißchen Frieden" | German | Failed to qualify | | 7 | 106 | 1982 | 1 | 161 |

== Hostings ==
| Year | Location | Venue | Presenter(s) |
|---|---|---|---|
| 1957 | Frankfurt | Großer Sendesaal | Anaid Iplicjian |
| 1983 | Munich | Rudi-Sedlmayer-Halle | Marlene Charell |
| 2011 | Düsseldorf | Esprit Arena | Anke Engelke, Judith Rakers and Stefan Raab |

== Awards ==
=== Barbara Dex Award ===
| Year | Performer | Host city | Ref. |
|---|---|---|---|
| 1998 | Guildo Horn | (United Kingdom) Birmingham | |

== Related involvement ==
=== Conductors ===
| Year | Conductor (Note: All conductors are of German nationality unless otherwise noted.) | Musical Director | Notes | Ref. |
|---|---|---|---|---|
| 1956 | (Switzerland) Fernando Paggi | N/A | Host conductor | |
| 1957 | Willy Berking | | (Note: Also conducted for Belgium, Luxembourg, and Switzerland) | |
| 1958 | (Netherlands) Dolf van der Linden | N/A | Host conductor | |
| 1959 | (France) Franck Pourcel | N/A | Host conductor | |
| 1960 | Franz Josef Breuer | N/A | | |
| 1961 | (France) Franck Pourcel | N/A | Host conductor | |
| 1962 | Rolf-Hans Müller | N/A | | |
| 1963 | Willy Berking | N/A | | |
| 1964 | Willy Berking | N/A | | |
| 1965 | Alfred Hause | N/A | | |
| 1966 | Willy Berking | N/A | | |
| 1967 | Hans Blum | N/A | | |
| 1968 | Horst Jankowski | N/A | | |
| 1969 | Hans Blum | N/A | | |
| 1970 | Christian Bruhn | N/A | | |
| 1971 | Dieter Zimmermann | N/A | | |
| 1972 | Paul Kuhn | N/A | | |
| 1973 | Günther-Eric Thöner | N/A | | |
| 1974 | Werner Scharfenberger | N/A | | |
| 1975 | Rainer Pietsch | N/A | | |
| 1976 | (United Kingdom) Les Humphries | N/A | | |
| 1977 | (United Kingdom) Ronnie Hazlehurst | N/A | Host conductor | |
| 1978 | Jean Frankfurter | N/A | | |
| 1979 | (Austria) Norbert Daum | N/A | | |
| 1980 | Wolfgang Rödelberger | N/A | | |
| 1981 | Wolfgang Rödelberger | N/A | | |
| 1982 | (Austria) Norbert Daum | N/A | | |
| 1983 | Dieter Reith | | | |
| 1984 | (Luxembourg) Pierre Cao | N/A | Host conductor | |
| 1985 | Rainer Pietsch | N/A | | |
| 1986 | Hans Blum | N/A | | |
| 1987 | (Hungarian People's Republic) László Bencker | N/A | | |
| 1988 | (United States) Michael Thatcher | N/A | | |
| 1989 | No conductor | N/A | | |
| 1990 | Rainer Pietsch | N/A | | |
| 1991 | Hermann Weindorf | N/A | | |
| 1992 | (Austria) Norbert Daum | N/A | | |
| 1993 | (Austria) Norbert Daum | N/A | | |
| 1994 | (Austria) Norbert Daum | N/A | | |
| 1995 | Hermann Weindorf | N/A | | |
| 1997 | No conductor | N/A | | |
| 1998 | Stefan Raab | N/A | (Note: Although the song didn't actually feature the orchestra, Raab still took the conductor's bow as the song's composer, writer, and arranger.) | |

=== Heads of delegation ===
| Year | Head of delegation | Ref. |
|---|---|---|
| 1996–2005 | Jürgen Meier-Beer | |
| 2007–2008 | Manfred Witt | |
| 2015 | Torsten Amarell | |
| 2016–2017 | Carola Conze | |
| 2018–2019 | Christoph Pellander | |
| 2020–present | Alexandra Wolfslast | |

=== Commentators and spokespersons ===
Over the years, commentary on ARD has been provided by several experienced radio and television presenters, including Ado Schlier, Thomas Gottschalk, Jan Hofer, Wolf Mittler, Fritz Egner and Werner Veigel. Peter Urban has provided commentary on Das Erste every year since 1997, and has only been absent once, in 2009, when he was forced to step down due to illness, with Tim Frühling from HR filling in to commentate in Moscow. For the later-cancelled 2020 contest, Michael Schulte was set to commentate together with Urban. Both commentated the official EBU replacement show Eurovision: Europe Shine a Light instead, as well as the German replacement show Eurovision 2020 – das deutsche Finale from the Elbphilharmonie in Hamburg. Urban stepped down as the German commentator after the 2023 contest. His successor is Thorsten Schorn.

Television and radio commentators and spokespersons
| Year | Television | | Radio | | Spokesperson | Ref. |
| Year | Channel | Commentator(s) | Channel | Commentator(s) | Spokesperson | Ref. |
|---|---|---|---|---|---|---|
| 1956 | Deutsches Fernsehen | Irene Koss | Radio München, Radio Bremen 2, SWF2 | Unknown | No spokesperson | |
| 1957 | Deutsches Fernsehen | No commentator | Zweites Programm, UKW West | Unknown | Unknown | |
| 1958 | Deutsches Fernsehen | Wolf Mittler | Unknown | | Unknown | |
| 1959 | Deutsches Fernsehen | Elena Gerhardt | Unknown | | Unknown | |
| 1960 | Deutsches Fernsehen | Wolf Mittler | Unknown | | Unknown | |
| 1961 | Deutsches Fernsehen | Wolf Mittler | Unknown | | Unknown | |
| 1962 | Deutsches Fernsehen | Ruth Kappelsberger | Unknown | | Unknown | |
| 1963 | Deutsches Fernsehen | Hanns-Joachim Friedrichs | Unknown | | Unknown | |
| 1964 | Deutsches Fernsehen | Hermann Rockmann | Unknown | | Unknown | |
| 1965 | Deutsches Fernsehen | Hermann Rockmann | Unknown | | Unknown | |
| 1966 | Deutsches Fernsehen | Hans-Joachim Rauschenbach | Unknown | | Unknown | |
| 1967 | Deutsches Fernsehen | Hans-Joachim Rauschenbach | Unknown | | Unknown | |
| 1968 | Deutsches Fernsehen | Unknown | Unknown | | Unknown | |
| 1969 | Deutsches Fernsehen | Unknown | Unknown | | Unknown | |
| 1970 | Deutsches Fernsehen | Unknown | Unknown | | Unknown | |
| 1971 | Deutsches Fernsehen | Hanns Verres | Unknown | | No spokesperson | |
| 1972 | Deutsches Fernsehen | Hanns Verres | Unknown | | No spokesperson | |
| 1973 | Deutsches Fernsehen | Unknown | Unknown | | No spokesperson | |
| 1974 | Deutsches Fernsehen | Unknown | Unknown | | Unknown | |
| 1975 | Deutsches Fernsehen | Werner Veigel | Unknown | | Unknown | |
| 1976 | Deutsches Fernsehen | Werner Veigel | Unknown | | Unknown | |
| 1977 | Deutsches Fernsehen | Werner Veigel | Unknown | | Unknown | |
| 1978 | Deutsches Fernsehen | Werner Veigel | Unknown | | Sigi Harreis | |
| 1979 | Deutsches Fernsehen | Gaby Schnelle and Ado Schlier | Unknown | | Unknown | |
| 1980 | Deutsches Fernsehen | Ado Schlier | Unknown | | Unknown | |
| 1981 | Deutsches Fernsehen | Unknown | Unknown | | Unknown | |
| 1982 | Deutsches Fernsehen | Ado Schlier | Unknown | | Unknown | |
| 1983 | Deutsches Fernsehen | Ado Schlier | Bayern 1, Frankfurt 1, NDR 2, RIAS 1 | Ado Schlier | Unknown | |
| 1984 | Deutsches Fernsehen | Ado Schlier | Unknown | | Unknown | |
| 1985 | Erstes Deutsches Fernsehen | Ado Schlier | Unknown | | Unknown | |
| 1986 | Erstes Deutsches Fernsehen | Ado Schlier | Unknown | | Unknown | |
| 1987 | Erstes Deutsches Fernsehen | Lotti Ohnesorge and Christoph Deumling | Unknown | | Unknown | |
| 1988 | Erstes Deutsches Fernsehen | Nicole and Claus-Erich Boetzkes | Unknown | | Unknown | |
| 1989 | Erstes Deutsches Fernsehen | Thomas Gottschalk | Unknown | Ado Schlier | Unknown | |
| 1990 | Erstes Deutsches Fernsehen | Fritz Egner | Unknown | | Unknown | |
| 1991 | Erstes Deutsches Fernsehen | Max Schautzer | Unknown | | Unknown | |
| 1992 | Erstes Deutsches Fernsehen | Jan Hofer | Unknown | | Unknown | |
| 1993 | Erstes Deutsches Fernsehen | Jan Hofer | Bayern 1 | Unknown | Unknown | |
| 1994 | Erstes Deutsches Fernsehen | Jan Hofer | No radio broadcast | | Carmen Nebel | |
| 1995 | Erstes Deutsches Fernsehen | Horst Senker | No radio broadcast | | Carmen Nebel | |
| 1996 | B1, MDR Fernsehen, N3, WDR Fernsehen | Ulf Ansorge | No radio broadcast | | Did not participate | |
| 1997 | Das Erste | Peter Urban | No radio broadcast | | Christina Mänz | |
| 1998 | Das Erste | Peter Urban | No radio broadcast | | Nena | |
| 1999 | Das Erste | Peter Urban | No radio broadcast | | Renan Demirkan | |
| 2000 | Das Erste | Peter Urban | No radio broadcast | | Axel Bulthaupt | |
| 2001 | Das Erste | Peter Urban | No radio broadcast | | Axel Bulthaupt | |
| 2002 | Das Erste | Peter Urban | No radio broadcast | | Axel Bulthaupt | |
| 2003 | Das Erste | Peter Urban | No radio broadcast | | Axel Bulthaupt | |
| 2004 | NDR Fernsehen (Semi-final); Das Erste (Final) | Peter Urban | No radio broadcast | | Thomas Anders | |
| 2005 | NDR Fernsehen (Semi-final); Das Erste (Final) | Peter Urban | No radio broadcast | | Thomas Hermanns | |
| 2006 | NDR Fernsehen (Semi-final); Das Erste (Final) | Peter Urban | No radio broadcast | | Thomas Hermanns | |
| 2007 | NDR Fernsehen (Semi-final); Das Erste (Final) | Peter Urban | No radio broadcast | | Thomas Hermanns | |
| 2008 | NDR Fernsehen (Semi-finals); Das Erste (Final) | Peter Urban | No radio broadcast | | Thomas Hermanns | |
| 2009 | Phoenix (SF1); NDR Fernsehen (SF2); Das Erste (Final) | Tim Frühling | No radio broadcast | | Thomas Anders | |
| 2010 | Das Erste | Peter Urban | NDR 2 (Final) | Tim Frühling and Thomas Mohr | Hape Kerkeling | |
| 2011 | Einsfestival (SF1); ProSieben (SF1) | Peter Urban and Steven Gätjen | NDR 2, WDR 1LIVE, hr3 (Final) | Thomas Mohr, Steffi Neu and Tim Frühling | Ina Müller | |
| 2011 | Das Erste (SF2/Final) | Peter Urban | NDR 2, WDR 1LIVE, hr3 (Final) | Thomas Mohr, Steffi Neu and Tim Frühling | Ina Müller | |
| 2012 | Das Erste | Peter Urban | NDR 2 | Thomas Mohr | Anke Engelke | |
| 2012 | Das Erste | Peter Urban | hr3 | Tim Frühling | Anke Engelke | |
| 2013 | NDR Fernsehen (Semi-finals); Einsfestival (SF2); Phoenix (SF2); Das Erste (Final) | Peter Urban | No radio broadcast | | Lena Meyer-Landrut | |
| 2014 | EinsPlus, Einsfestival; Phoenix (Semi-finals); Das Erste (Final) | Peter Urban | No radio broadcast | | Helene Fischer | |
| 2015 | EinsPlus | Sign language interpreters | No radio broadcast | | Barbara Schöneberger | |
| 2015 | Einsfestival, Phoenix (Semi-finals); Das Erste (Final) | Peter Urban | No radio broadcast | | Barbara Schöneberger | |
| 2016 | Einsfestival, Phoenix (Semi-finals); Das Erste (Final) | Peter Urban | No radio broadcast | | Barbara Schöneberger | |
| 2017 | One; NDR Fernsehen (SF2); Das Erste (Final) | Peter Urban | No radio broadcast | | Barbara Schöneberger | |
| 2018 | One; Das Erste, Deutsche Welle (Final) | Peter Urban | No radio broadcast | | Barbara Schöneberger | |
| 2019 | One; Das Erste, Deutsche Welle (Final) | Peter Urban | No radio broadcast | | Barbara Schöneberger | |
| ~~2020~~ | ~~One~~; ~~Das Erste, Deutsche Welle (Final)~~ | ~~Peter Urban, Michael Schulte~~ | No radio broadcast | | Not announced before cancellation | |
| 2021 | One; Das Erste, Deutsche Welle (Final) | Peter Urban | No radio broadcast | | Barbara Schöneberger | |
| 2022 | One; Das Erste, Deutsche Welle (Final) | Peter Urban | Radio Eins (Final) | Amelie Ernst and Max Spallek | Barbara Schöneberger | |
| 2023 | One; Das Erste, DW Deutsch, DW Deutsch+ (Final) | Peter Urban | Radio Eins (Final) | Amelie Ernst and Max Spallek | Elton | |
| 2024 | One (Semi-finals); Das Erste (Final) | Thorsten Schorn | Radio Eins (Final) | Amelie Ernst and Max Spallek | Ina Müller | |
| 2025 | One (Semi-finals); Das Erste (Final) | Thorsten Schorn | Radio Eins (Final) | Amelie Ernst and Max Spallek | Michael Schulte | |
| 2026 | One (Semi-finals); Das Erste (Final) | Thorsten Schorn | Radio Eins (Final) | Amelie Ernst and Max Spallek | Wavvyboi | |

==== Other shows ====
| Show | Commentator | Channel | Ref. |
|---|---|---|---|
| Songs of Europe | Dagmar Berghoff | Deutsches Fernsehen | |
| Congratulations: 50 Years of the Eurovision Song Contest | Peter Urban | SWR, WDR | |
| Eurovision Song Contest's Greatest Hits (Note: Broadcast on 16 May (NDR and MDR Fernsehen) and 22 May (EinsFestival)) | Peter Urban | NDR, MDR, EinsFestival | |
| Eurovision: Europe Shine a Light (Note: Broadcast on a one-hour delay.) | Peter Urban, Michael Schulte | Das Erste | |

=== Costume designers ===
| Year | Costume designers | Ref. |
|---|---|---|
| 2026 | Jasmin Erbas | |

== Photo gallery ==
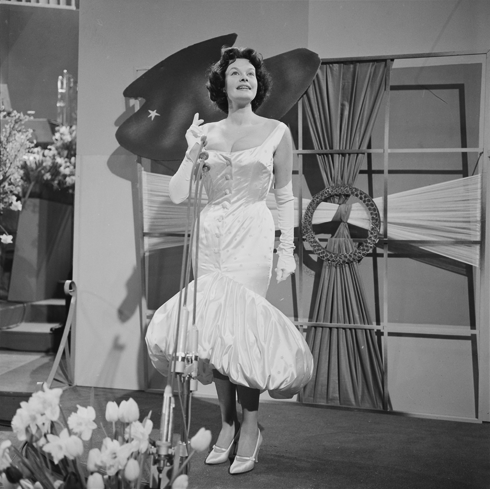
Margot Hielscher in Hilversum (1958)

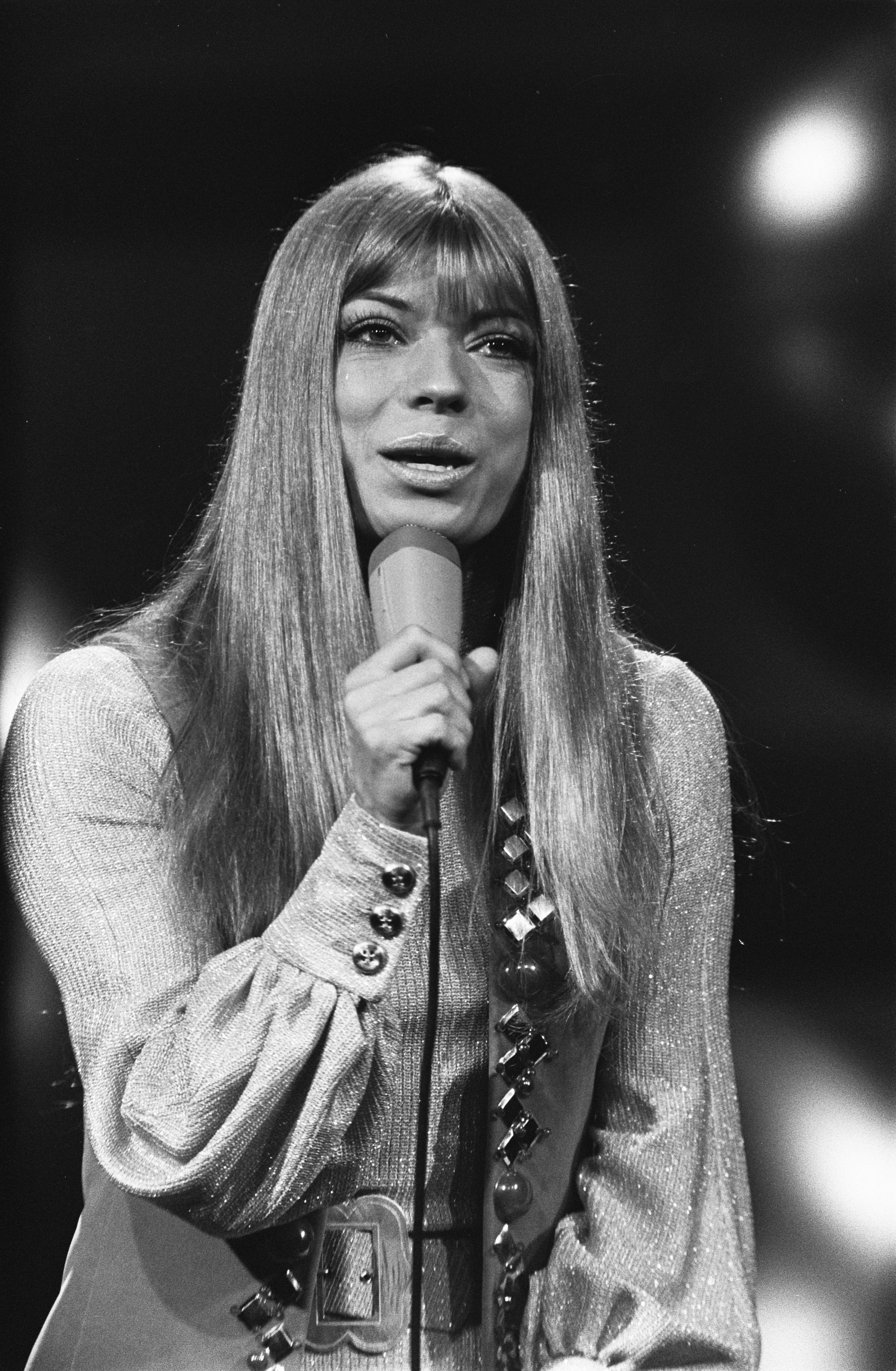
Katja Ebstein in Amsterdam (1970)

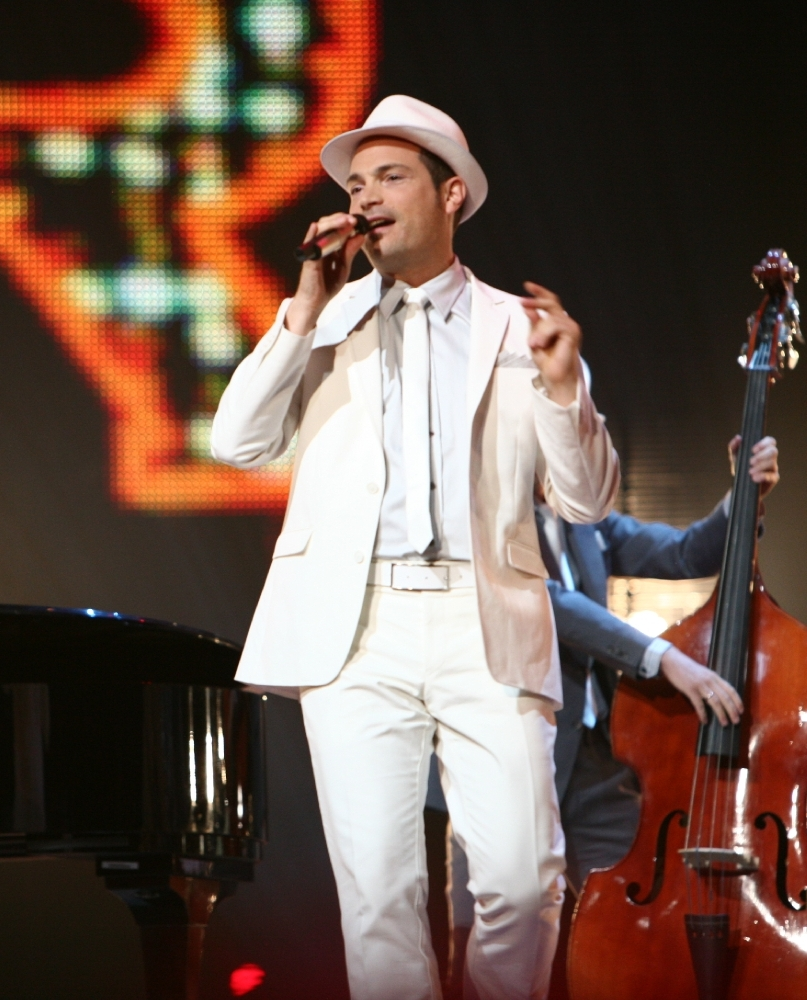
Roger Cicero in Helsinki (2007)

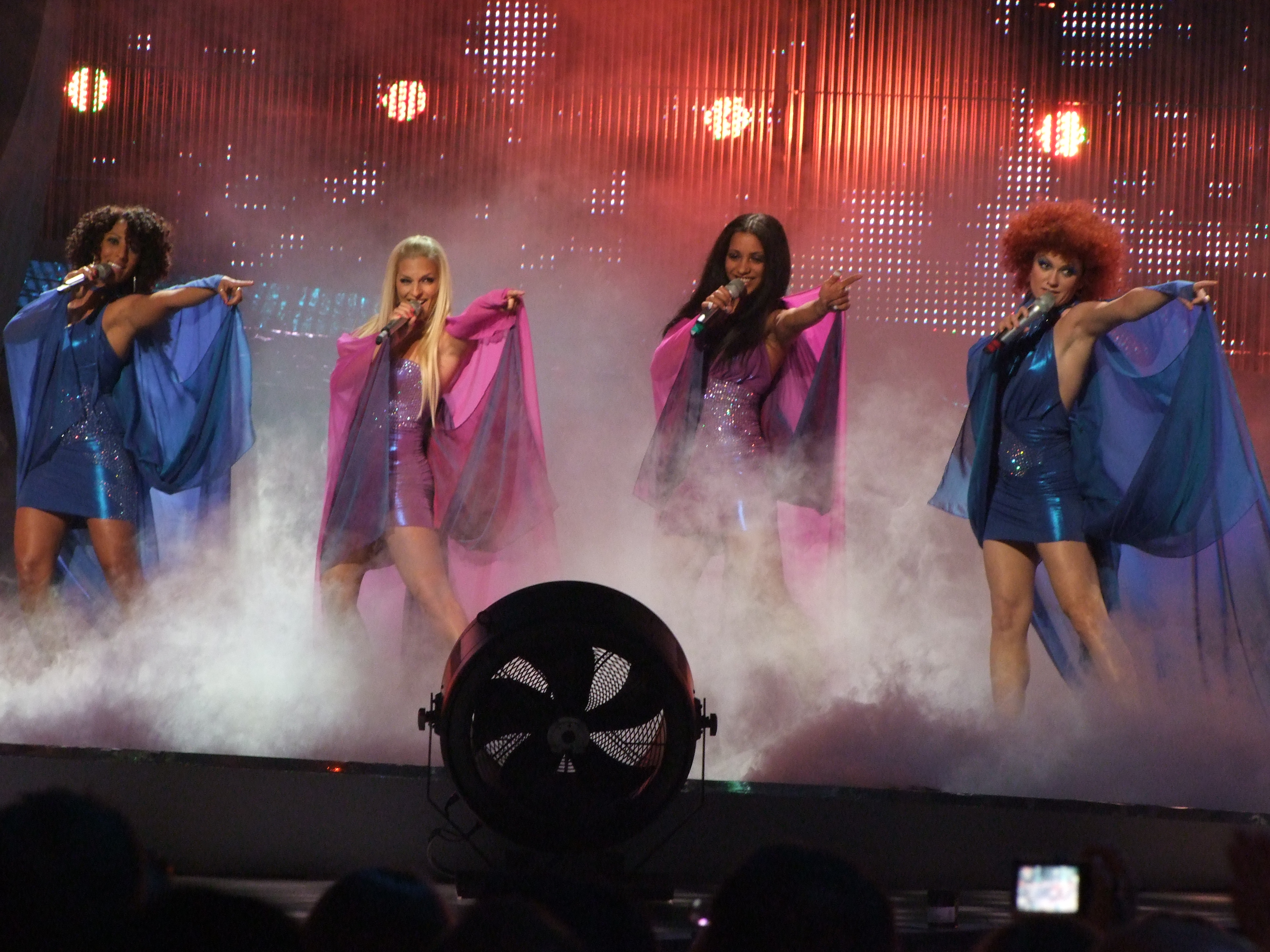
No Angels in Belgrade (2008)

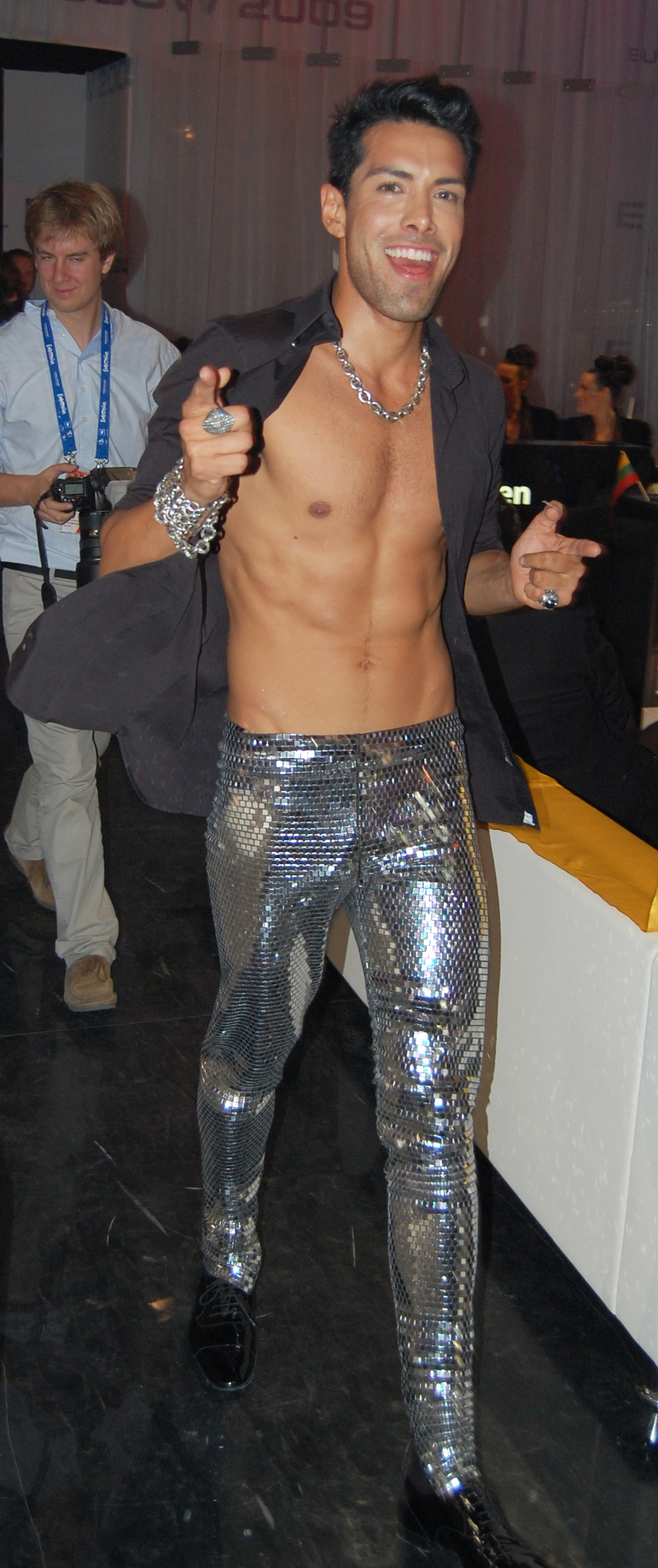
Oscar Sings in Moscow (2009)

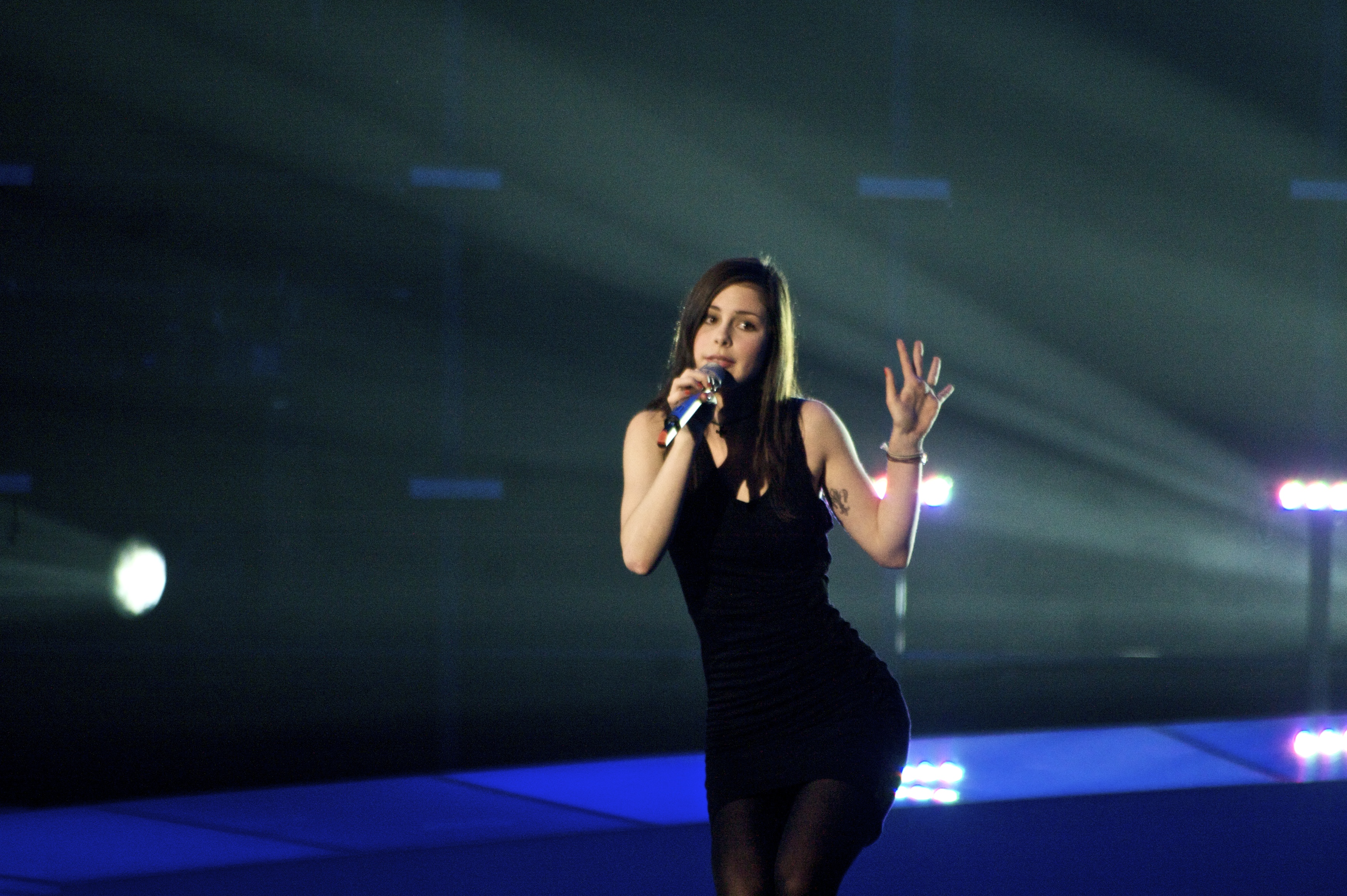
Lena in Oslo (2010)

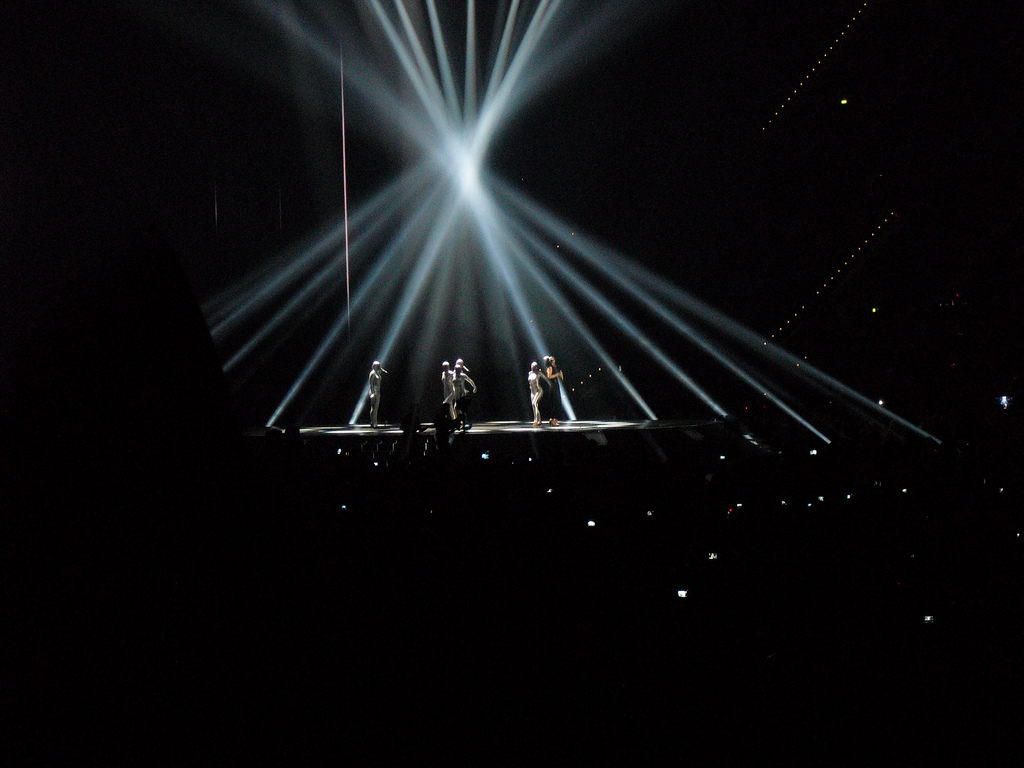
Lena in Düsseldorf (2011)

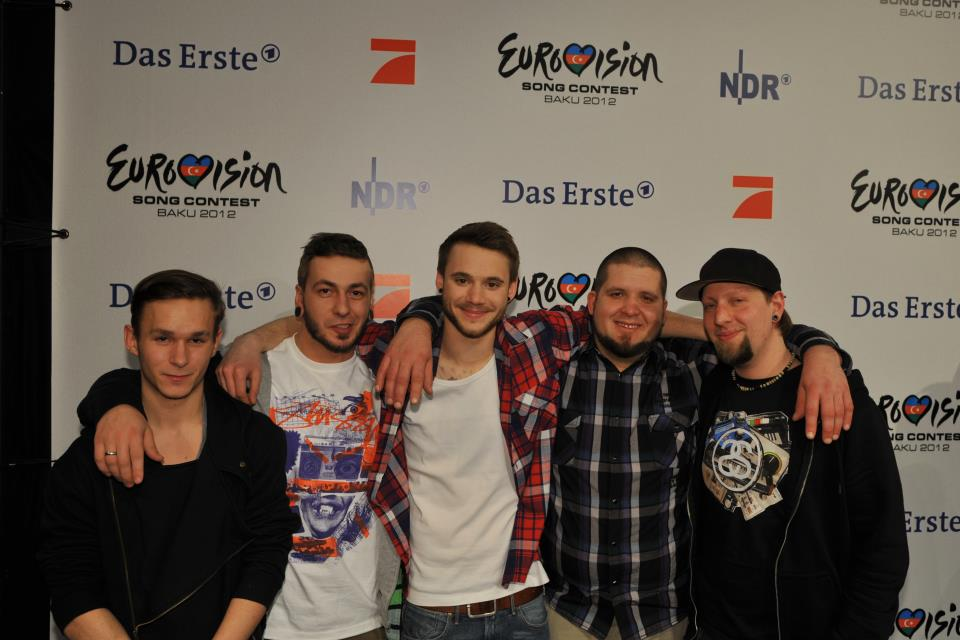
Roman Lob (middle) in Baku (2012)

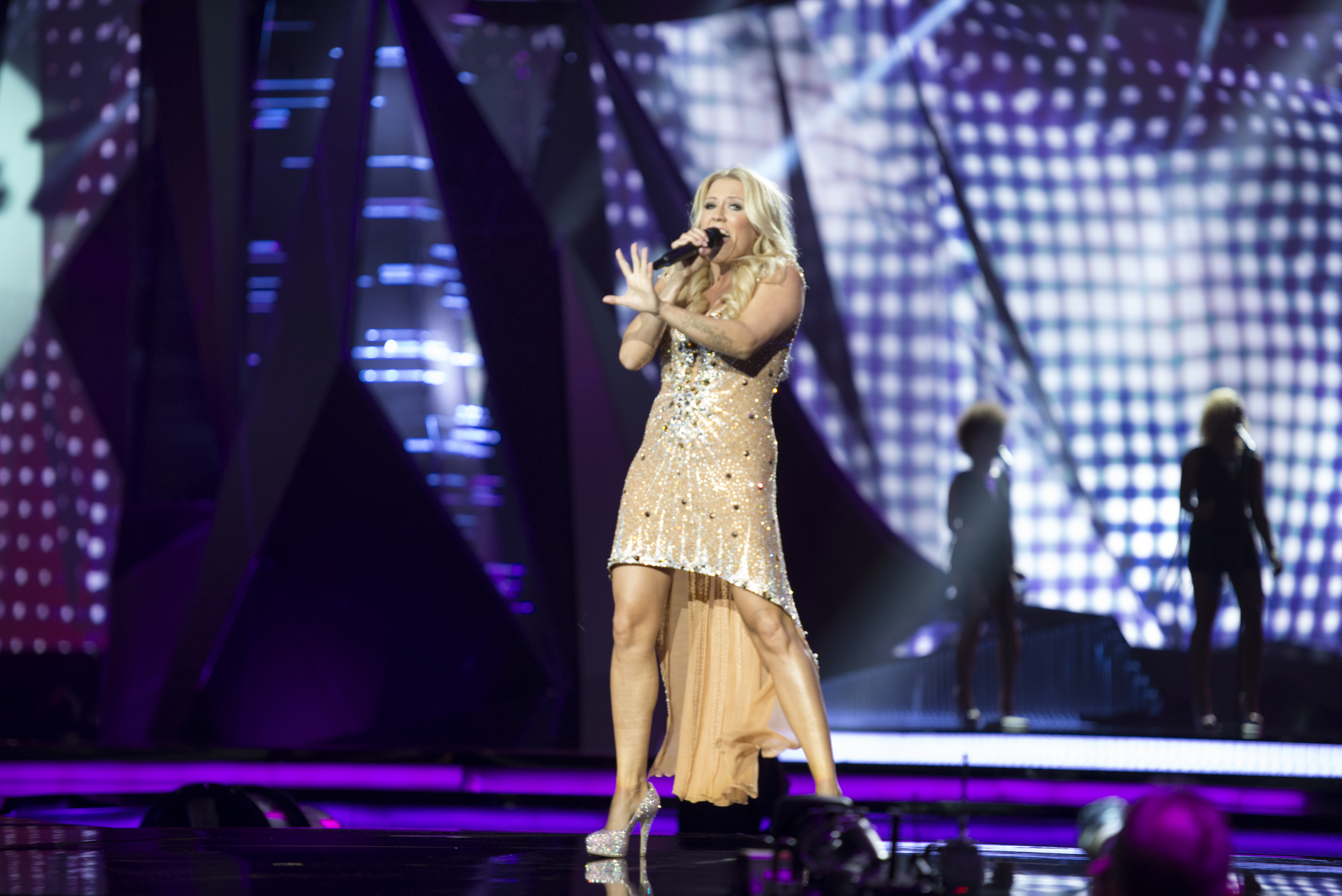
Cascada in Malmö (2013)

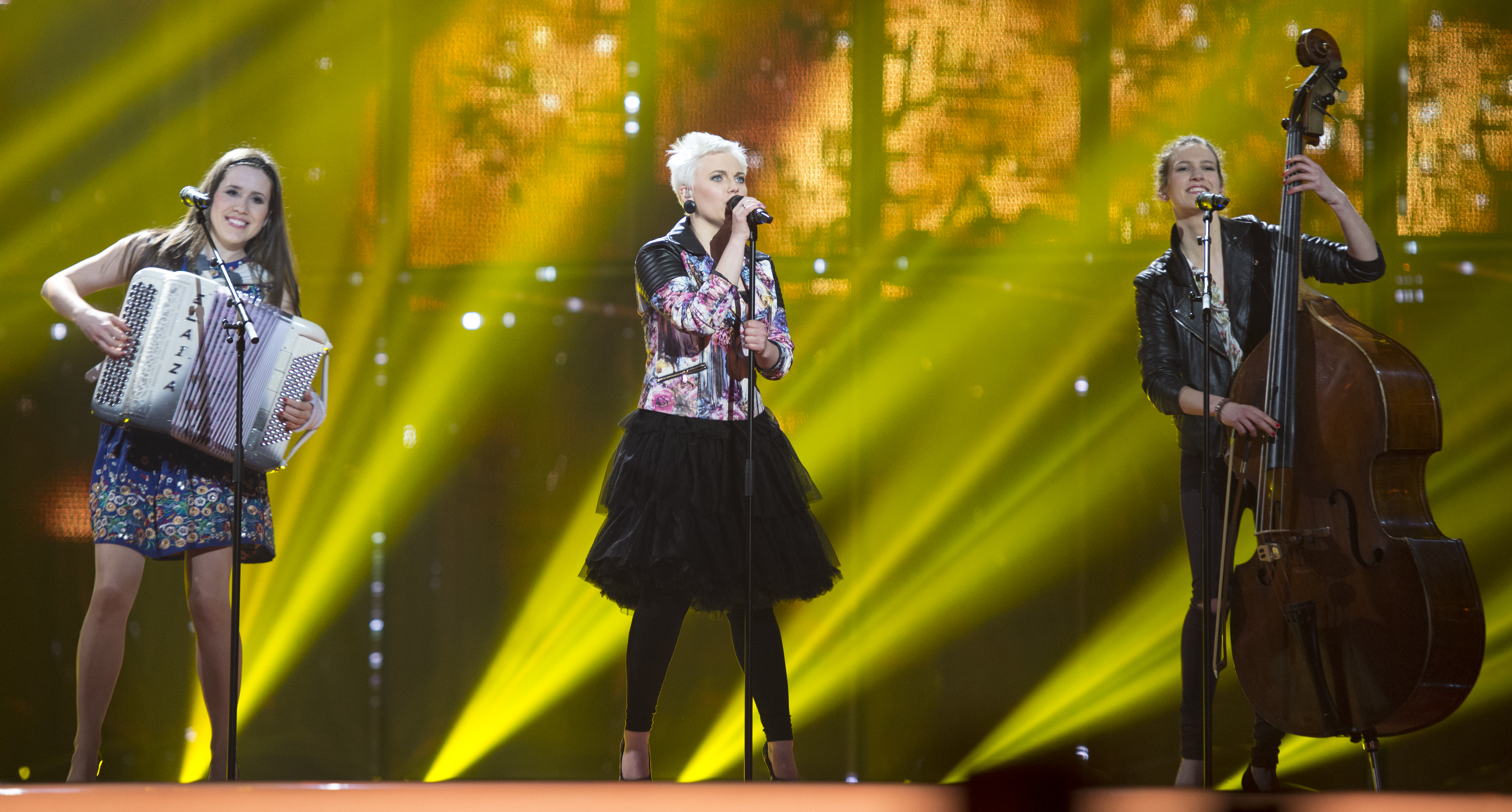
Elaiza in Copenhagen (2014)

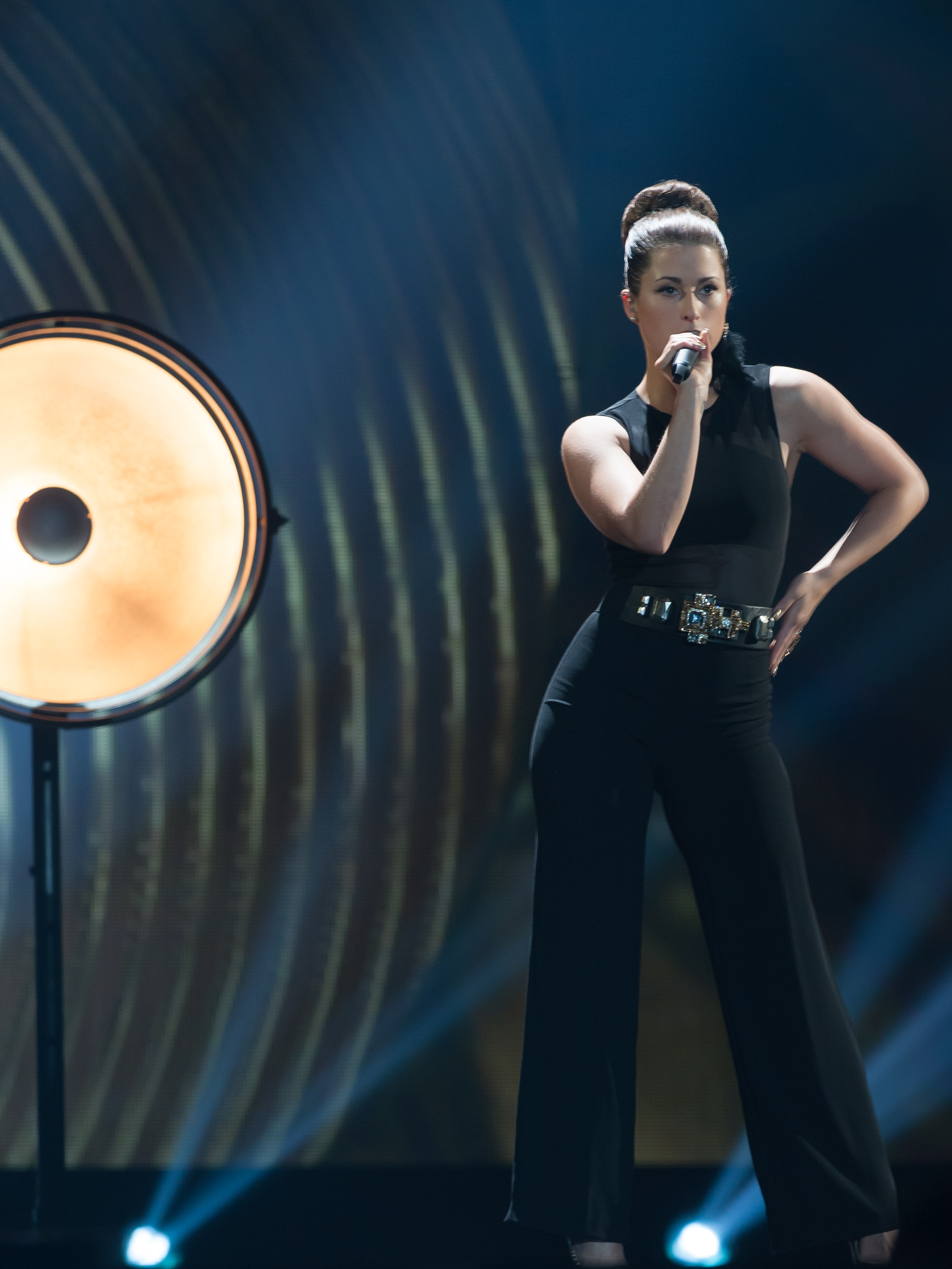
Ann Sophie in Vienna (2015)

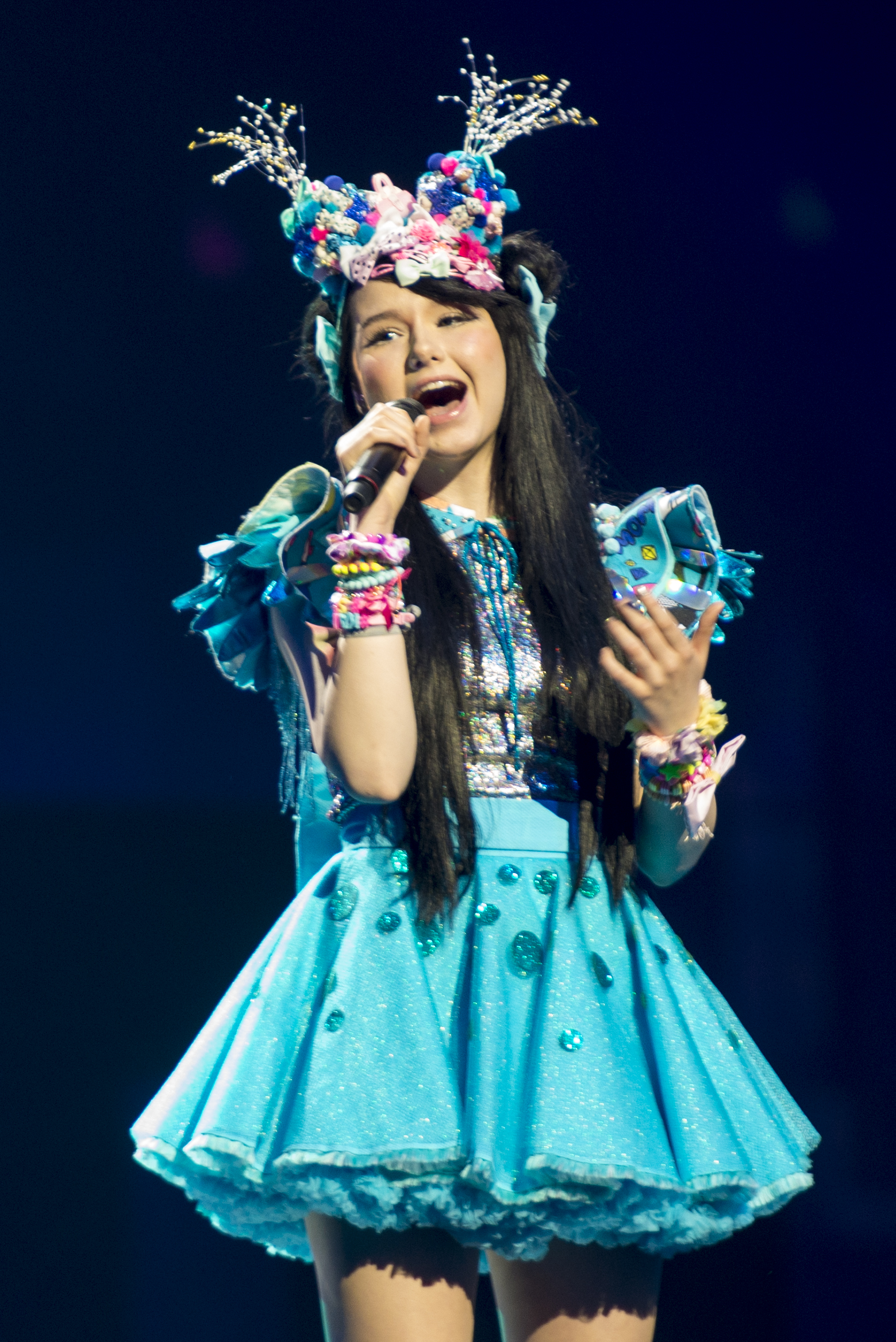
Jamie-Lee in Stockholm (2016)

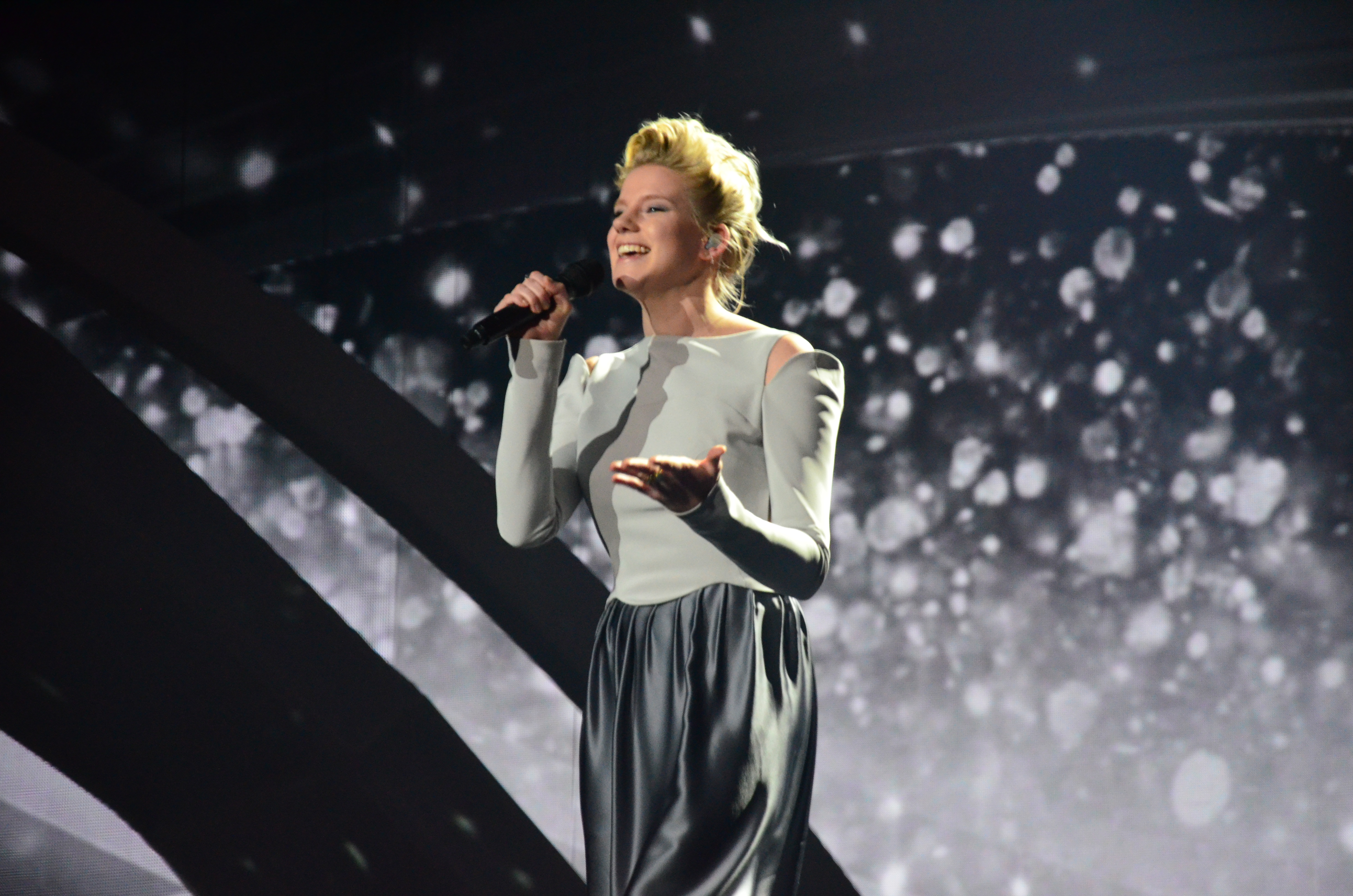
Levina in Kyiv (2017)

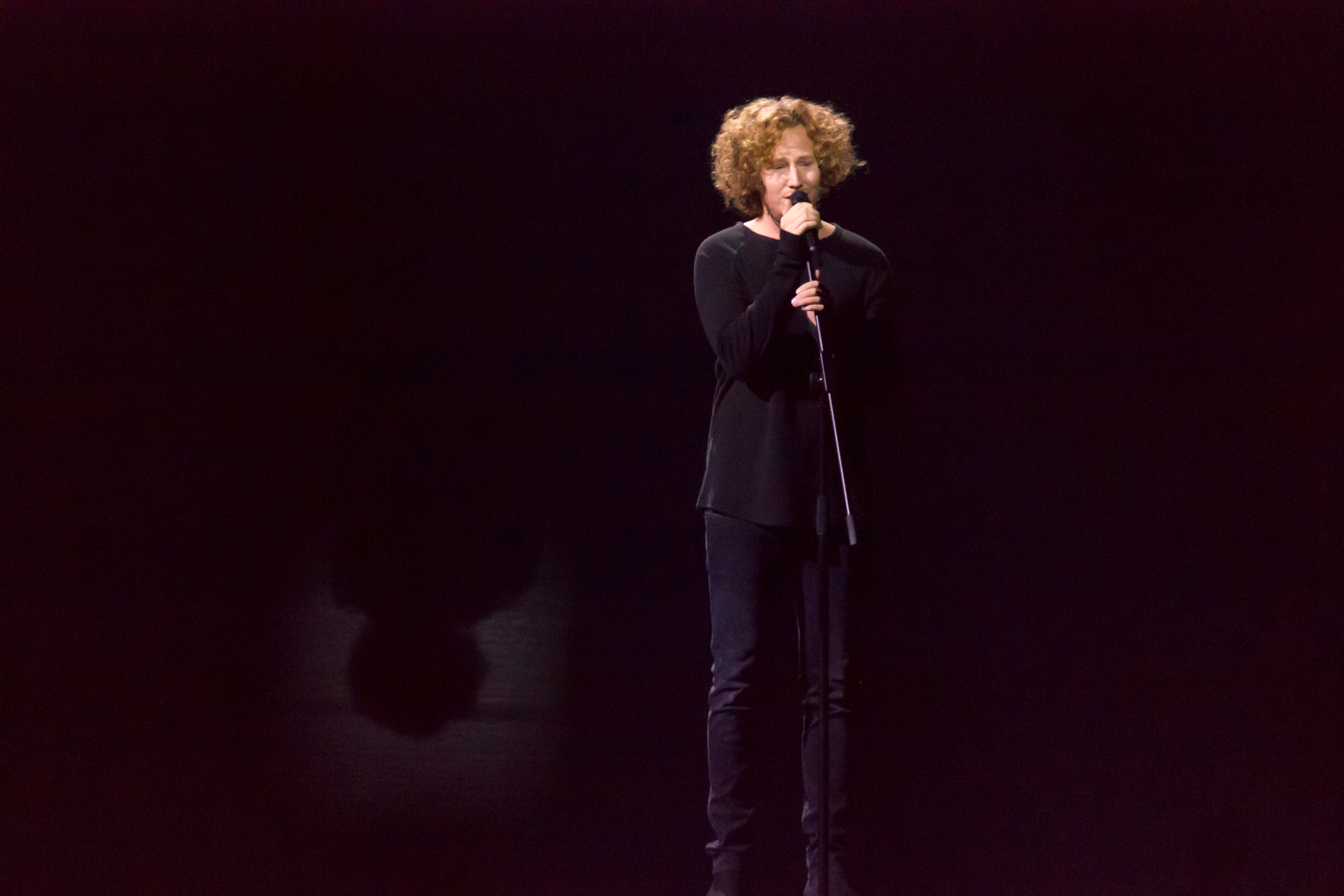
Michael Schulte in Lisbon (2018)

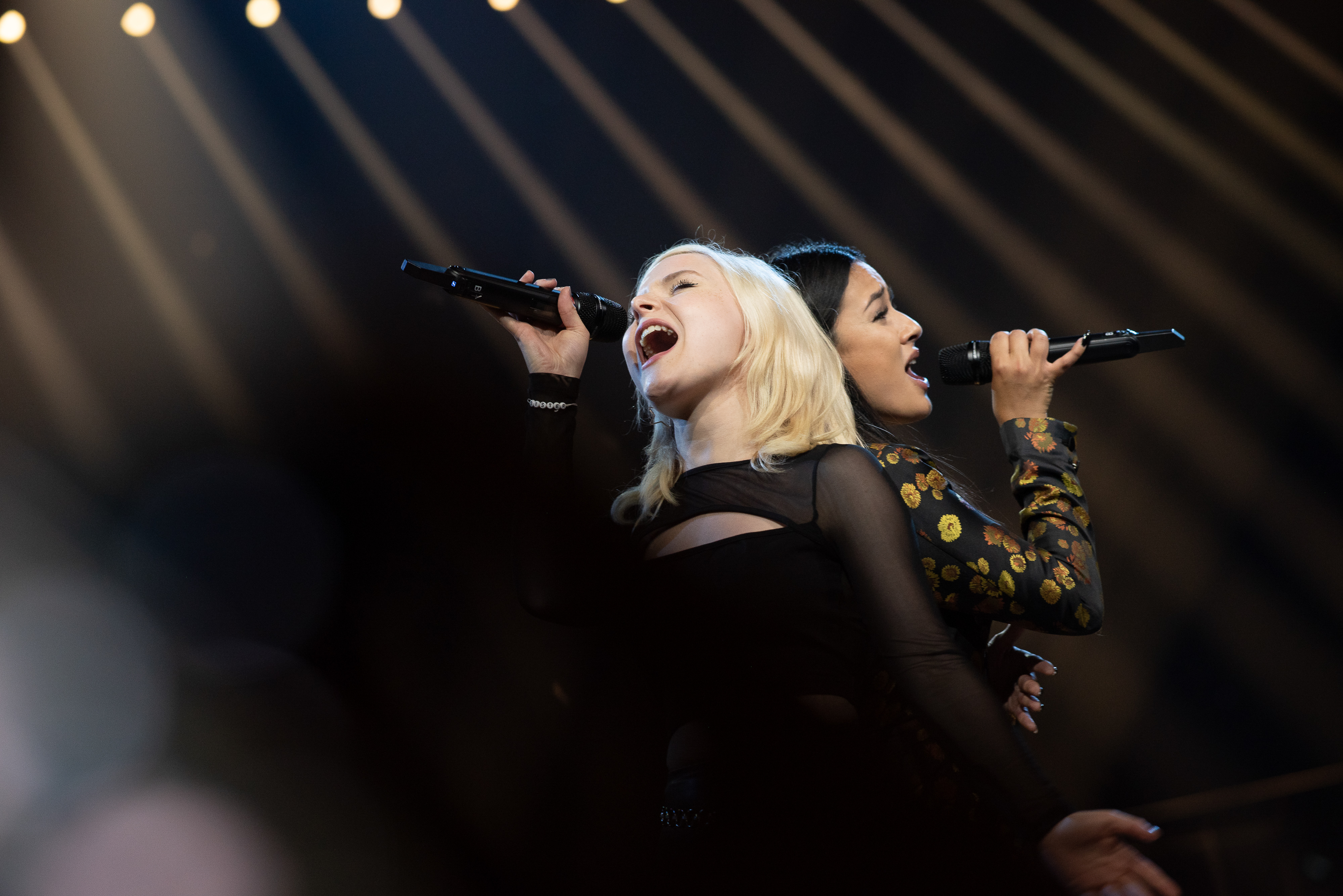
Sisters in Tel Aviv (2019)

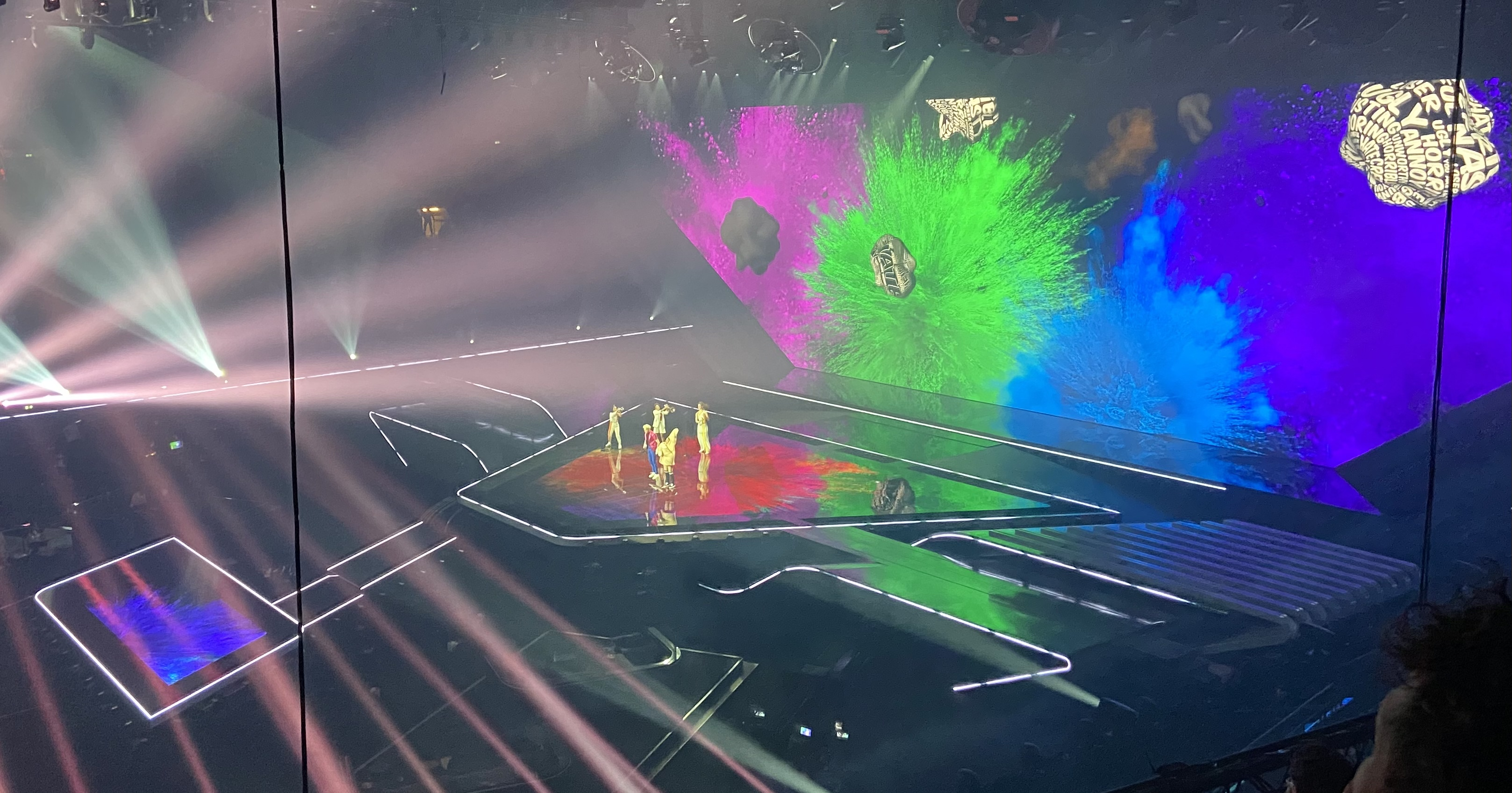
Jendrik in Rotterdam (2021)

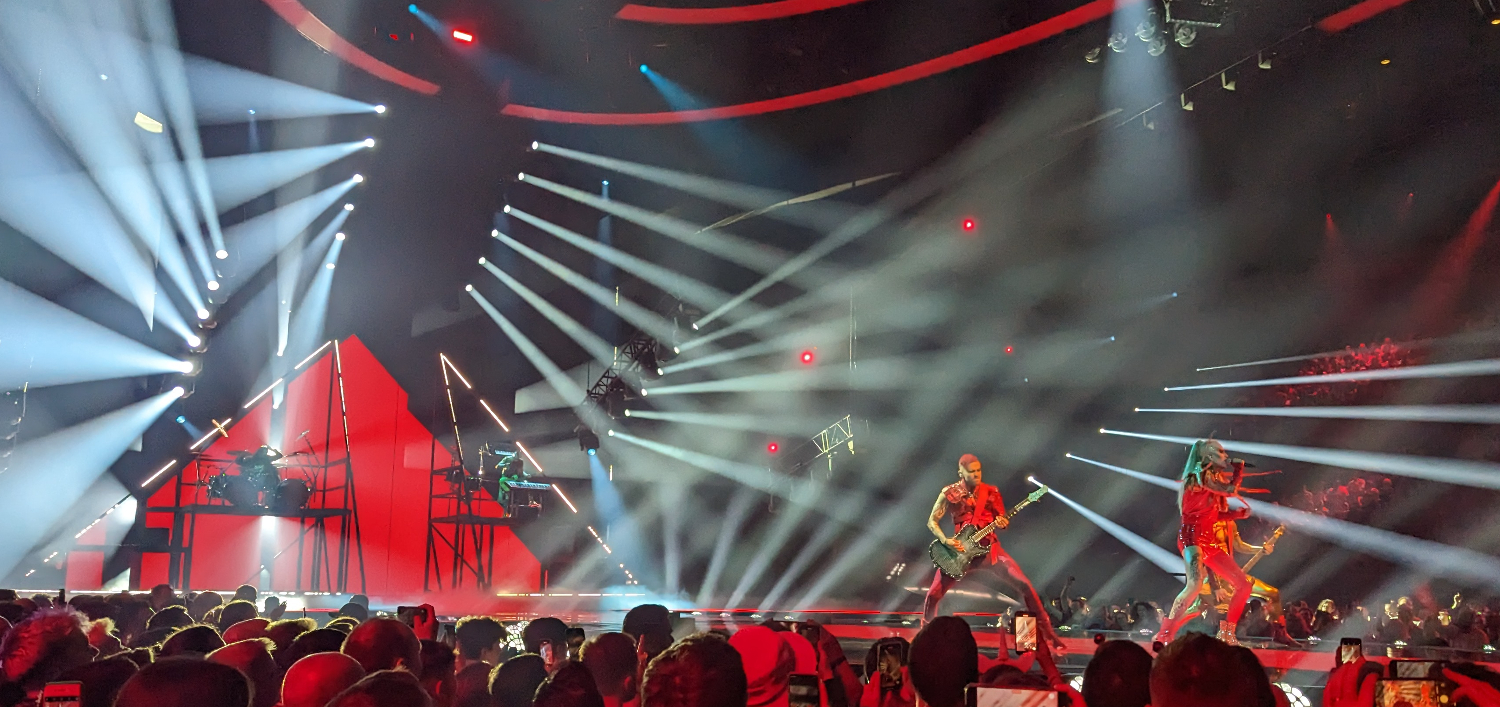
Lord of the Lost in Liverpool (2023)

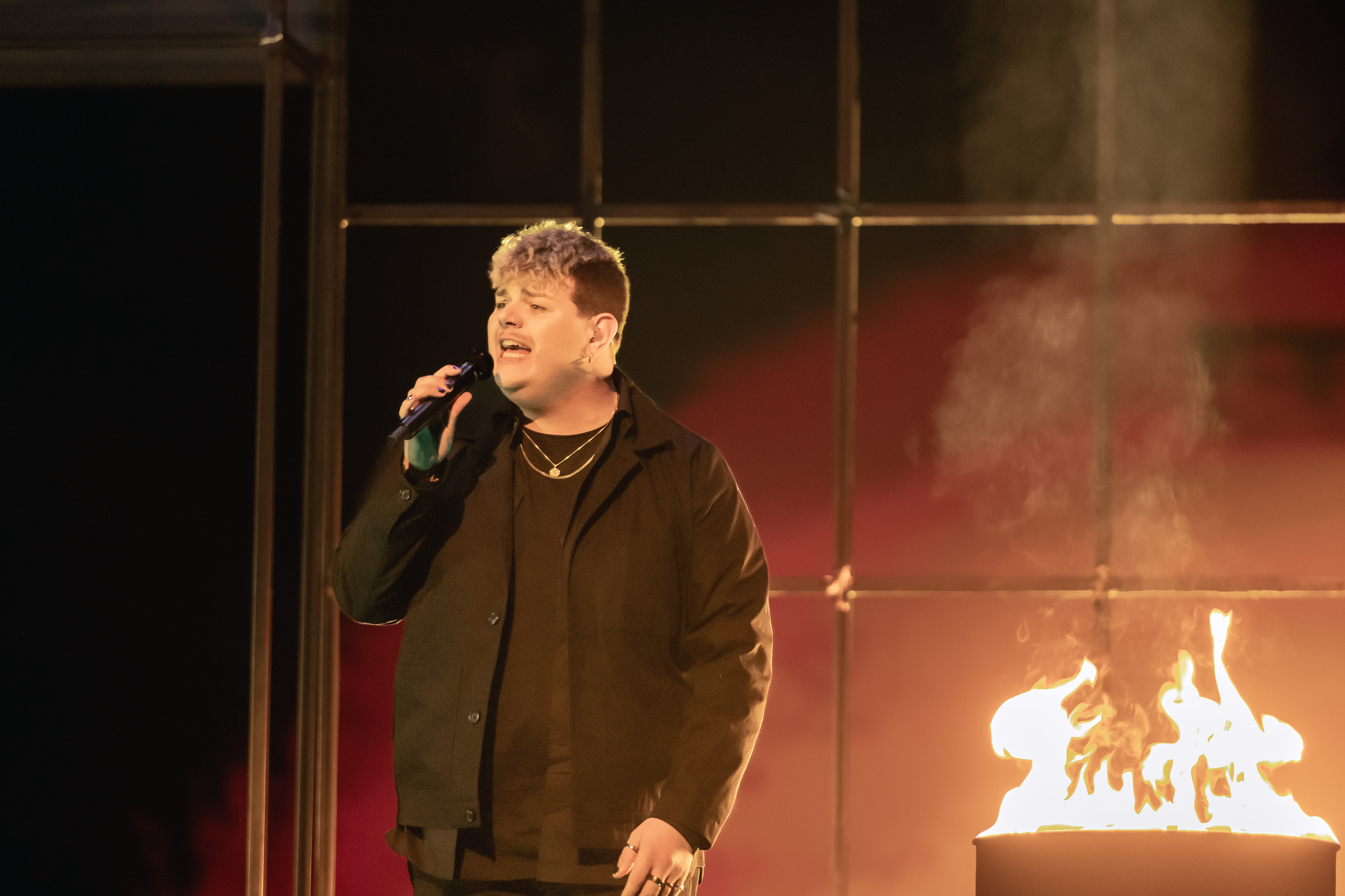
Isaak in Malmö (2024)

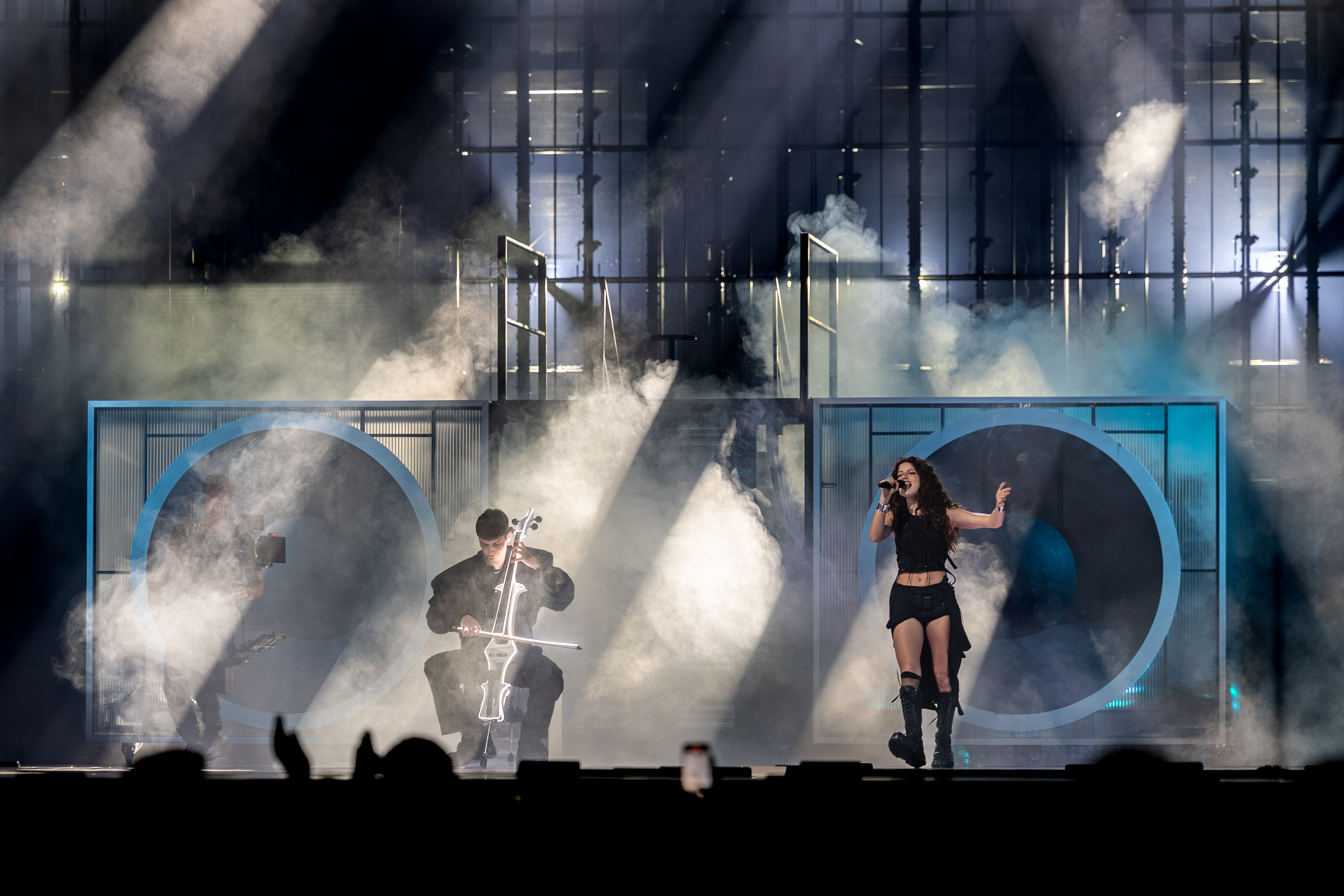
Abor and Tynna in Basel (2025)

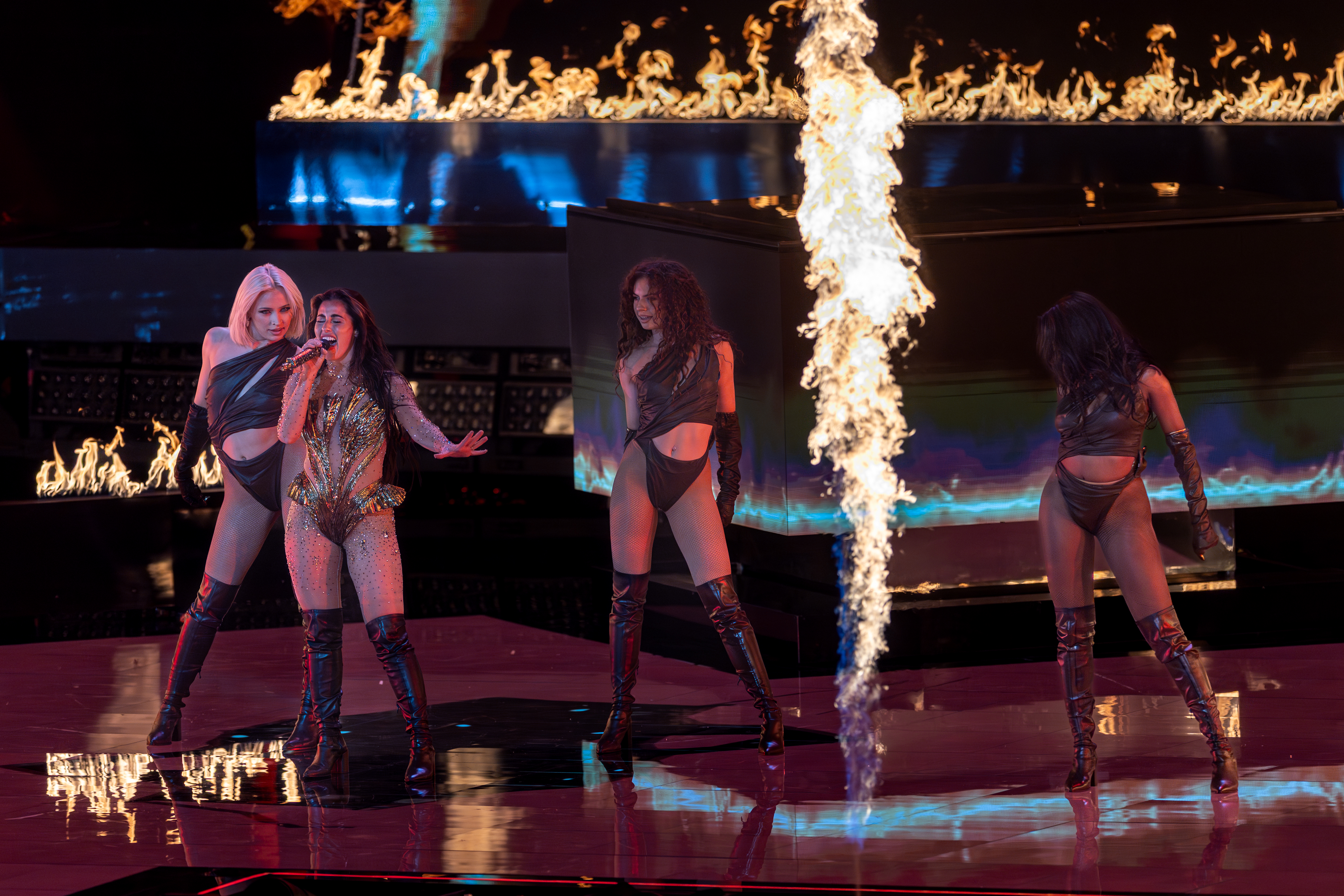
Sarah Engels in Vienna (2026)

== See also ==
- Germany in the Junior Eurovision Song Contest
- Germany in the Eurovision Young Dancers
- Germany in the Eurovision Young Musicians

== Notes and references ==
=== Works cited ===
- O'Connor, John Kennedy (2010). The Eurovision Song Contest: The Official History (2nd ed.). London: Carlton Books. ISBN 978-1-84732-521-1.
- Roxburgh, Gordon (2020). Songs for Europe: The United Kingdom at the Eurovision Song Contest. Vol. Four: The 1990s. Prestatyn: Telos Publishing. ISBN 978-1-84583-163-9.
