= Michail Paweletz =

German journalist and television moderator

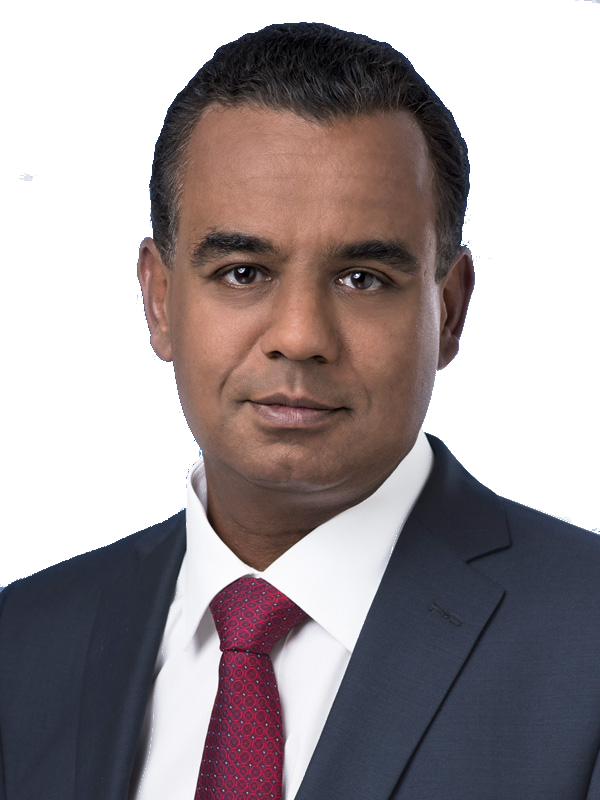
- Paweletz in 2014
- Born: 26 March 1965 (age 61); Heidelberg, Baden-Württemberg, West Germany
- Education: Abitur (Bunsen-Gymnasium Heidelberg)
- Occupations: Journalist; Television moderator

Michail Paweletz (born 26 March 1965) is a German journalist and television moderator.

== Life ==
Michail Paweletz was born and grew up in Heidelberg, Baden-Württemberg, Germany on March 26, 1965. After graduating from the Bunsen-Gymnasium Heidelberg, he began studying the violin at the Hochschule für Musik und Theater Hamburg, which he completed at the Folkwang University of the Arts in Essen, North Rhine-Westphalia, Germany. In addition to studying music, he completed acting and speaking training. After studying music, he began in 1995 as a presenter at the ARD-Nachtkonzert and as a speaker for Norddeutscher Rundfunk (NDR). His studies were the prerequisite for his journalistic work at NDR Kultur, where from 1996 he moderated numerous programs, conducted interviews and worked as a reporter. He has been on the screen at ARD-aktuell since 2004, as a speaker and moderator for the news program Tagesschau as well as in Nachtmagazin and Tagesschau-Nachrichten on tagesschau24.

In addition, Paweletz also reads the news on the NDR radio.

In 2012, Paweletz appeared as a newscaster in Tatort: Ordnung im Lot.

On behalf of ARD-aktuell, he developed the news format Mics-News in 2018, which he moderated in 5 episodes.

Paweletz has been the main narrator at Tatort. Der Podcast (Tatort. The Podcast) since 2020.

On behalf of tagesschau24 and the NDR Kulturjournal, he developed the format Wie rassistisch bist du? Das Experiment (How racist are you? The Experiment) for IGTV, YouTube and TV, which he also moderated.

== Literature ==
- Dayan Kodua (publisher), Susanne Dorn (author): My Black Skin: Schwarz. Erfolgreich. Deutsch. Verlag seltmann+söhne, Berlin/ Lüdenscheid 2014, ISBN 978-3-944721-00-2.
