= Tagesschau (German TV programme) =

German television news service

- Logo since 1997
- Genre: News Programme
- Presented by: See presenters below
- Theme music composer: Hans Carste
- Opening theme: "Hammond Fantasy"
- Countries of origin: West Germany (1952–1990); Germany (1990–present)
- Original language: German

Production
- Producer: ARD-aktuell
- Production location: Hamburg
- Running time: 5–15 min

Original release
- Network: Das Erste, Tagesschau24 and several other ARD channels
- Release: 26 December 1952 – present

Related
- Tagesthemen, Nachtmagazin

Tagesschau (pronounced [ˈtaːɡəsˌʃaʊ̯], lit. 'Review of the Day') is a German national and international television news service produced by the editorial staff of ARD-aktuell on behalf of the German public-service television network ARD.

The main edition of the programme is aired at 20:00 (08:00 pm) on Das Erste. It is also simulcast on several ARD-affiliated networks, including NDR Fernsehen, RBB Fernsehen, SWR Fernsehen, WDR Fernsehen, hr-fernsehen, 3sat, Phoenix, and ARD-alpha. It also serves as the main news brand for ARD, giving its name to the website tagesschau.de and news channel Tagesschau24.

== History ==
On 25 July 1988, Tagesschau was on the brink of being cancelled due to a warning strike organized by the broadcasting union RFFU. This blackout would have been for the first (and only) time in its history, but the Rundschau from Bavaria, produced by Bayerisches Fernsehen (Bavarian Television) in Munich, helped out as a substitute program.

== Presenters ==
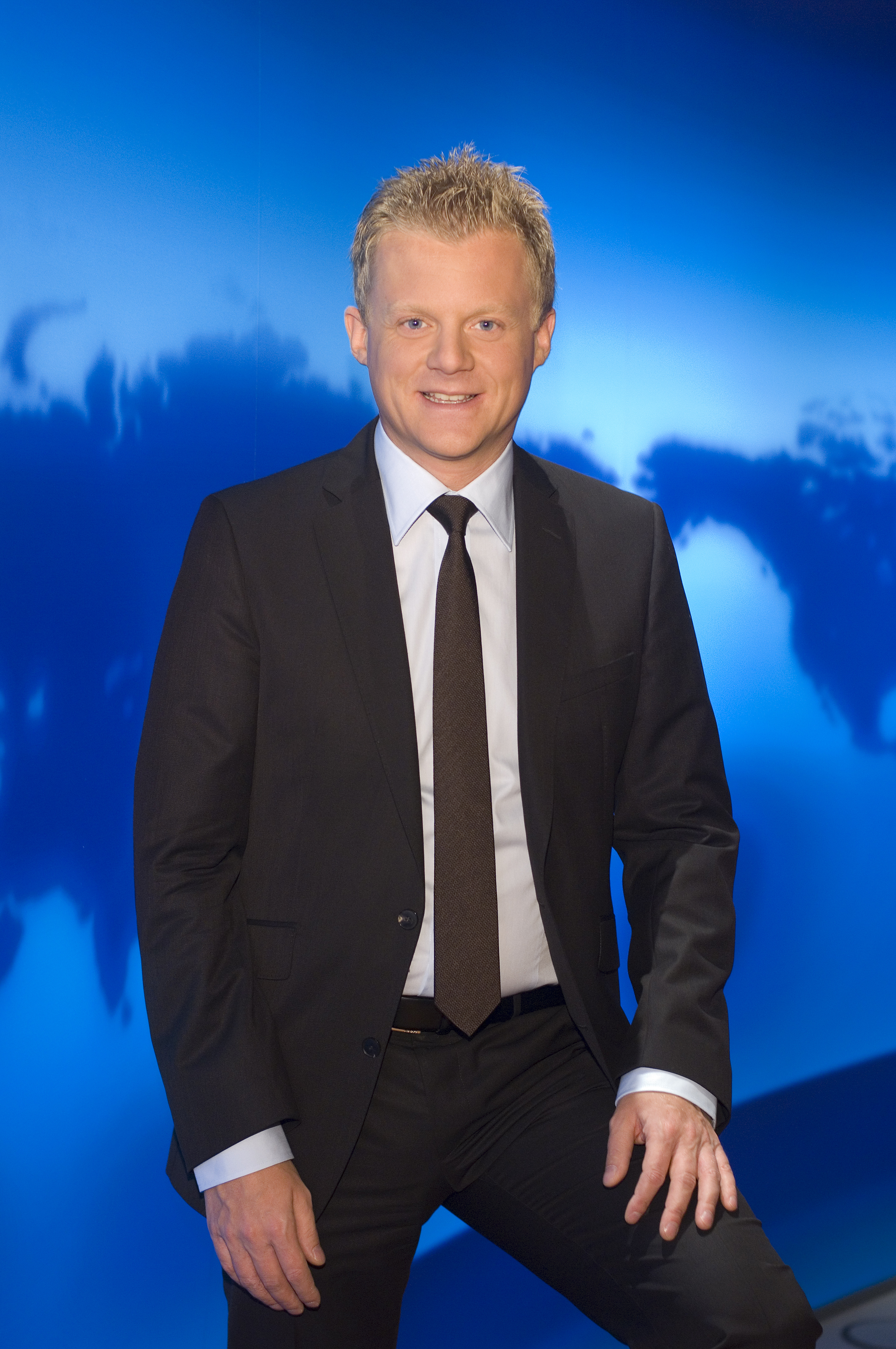
Marc Bator

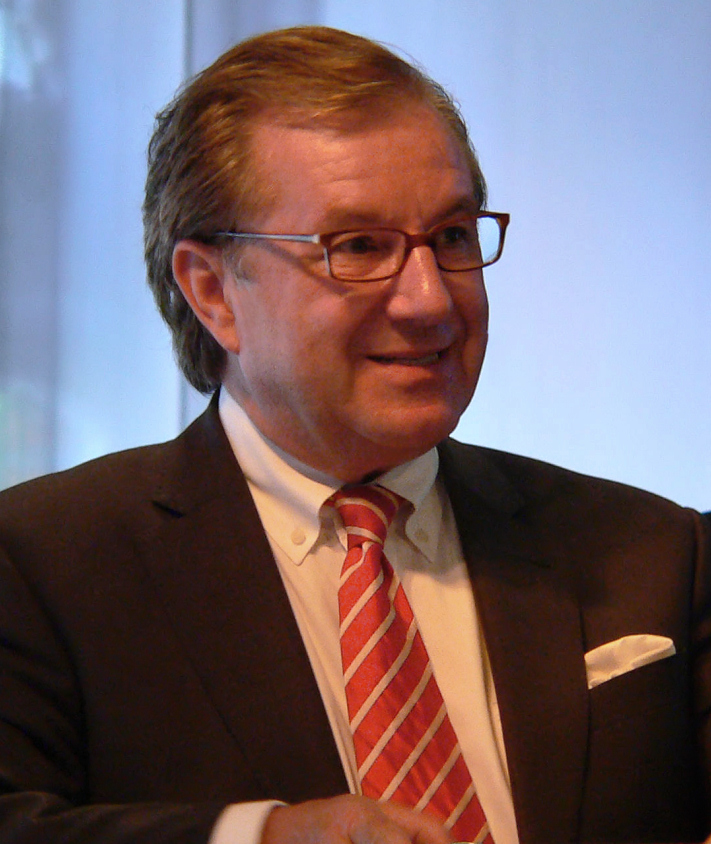
Jan Hofer

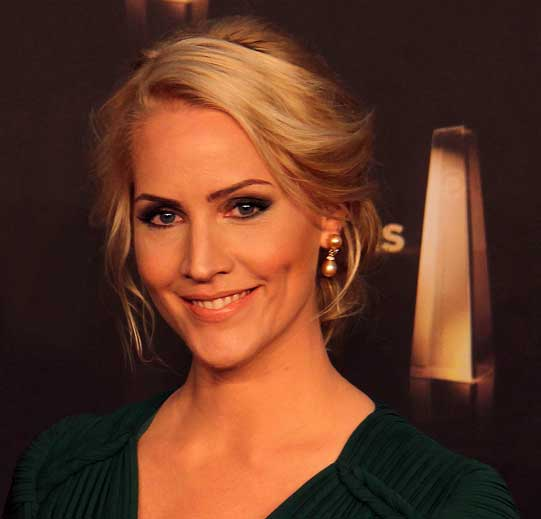
Judith Rakers

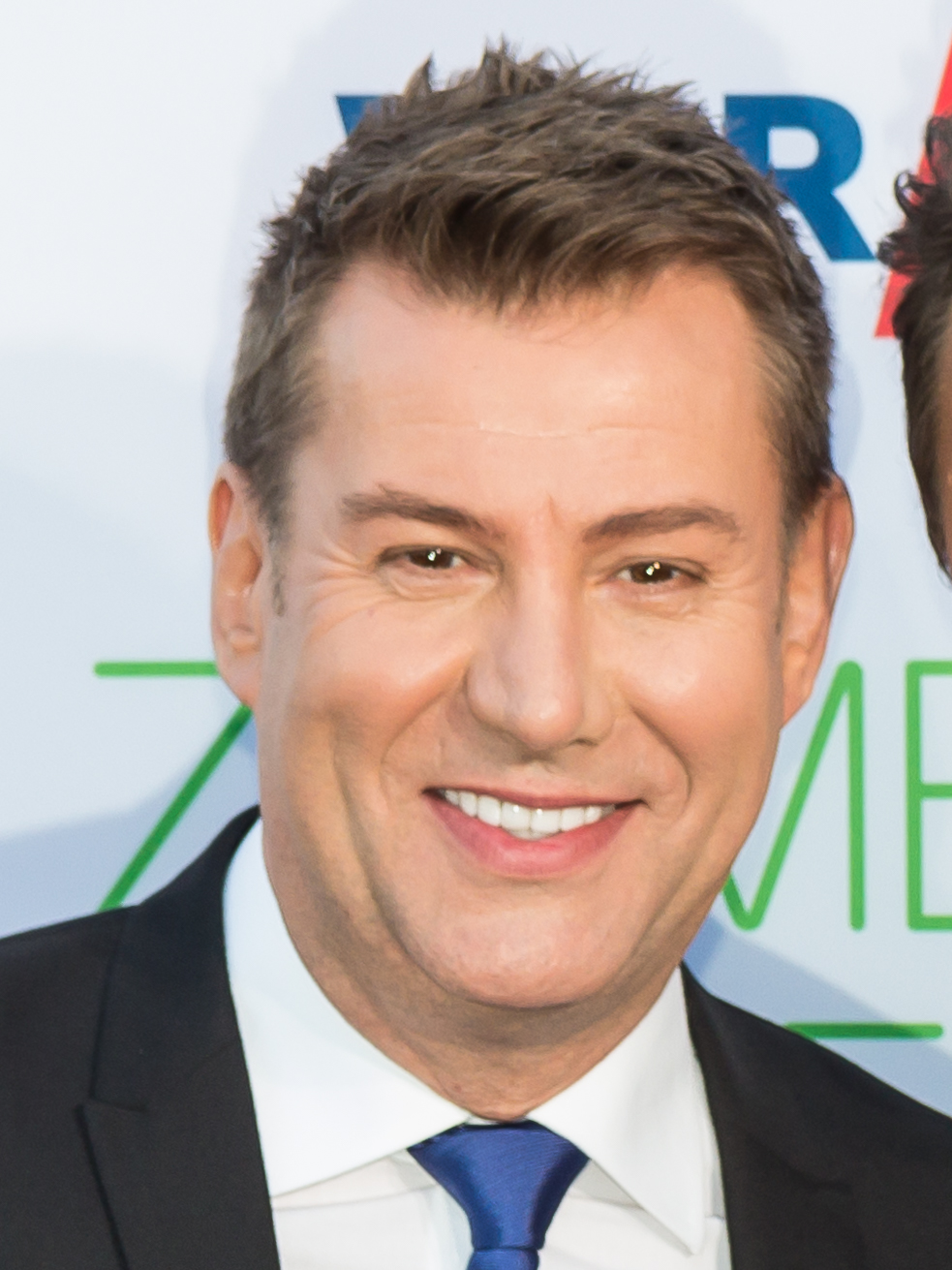
Jens Riewa

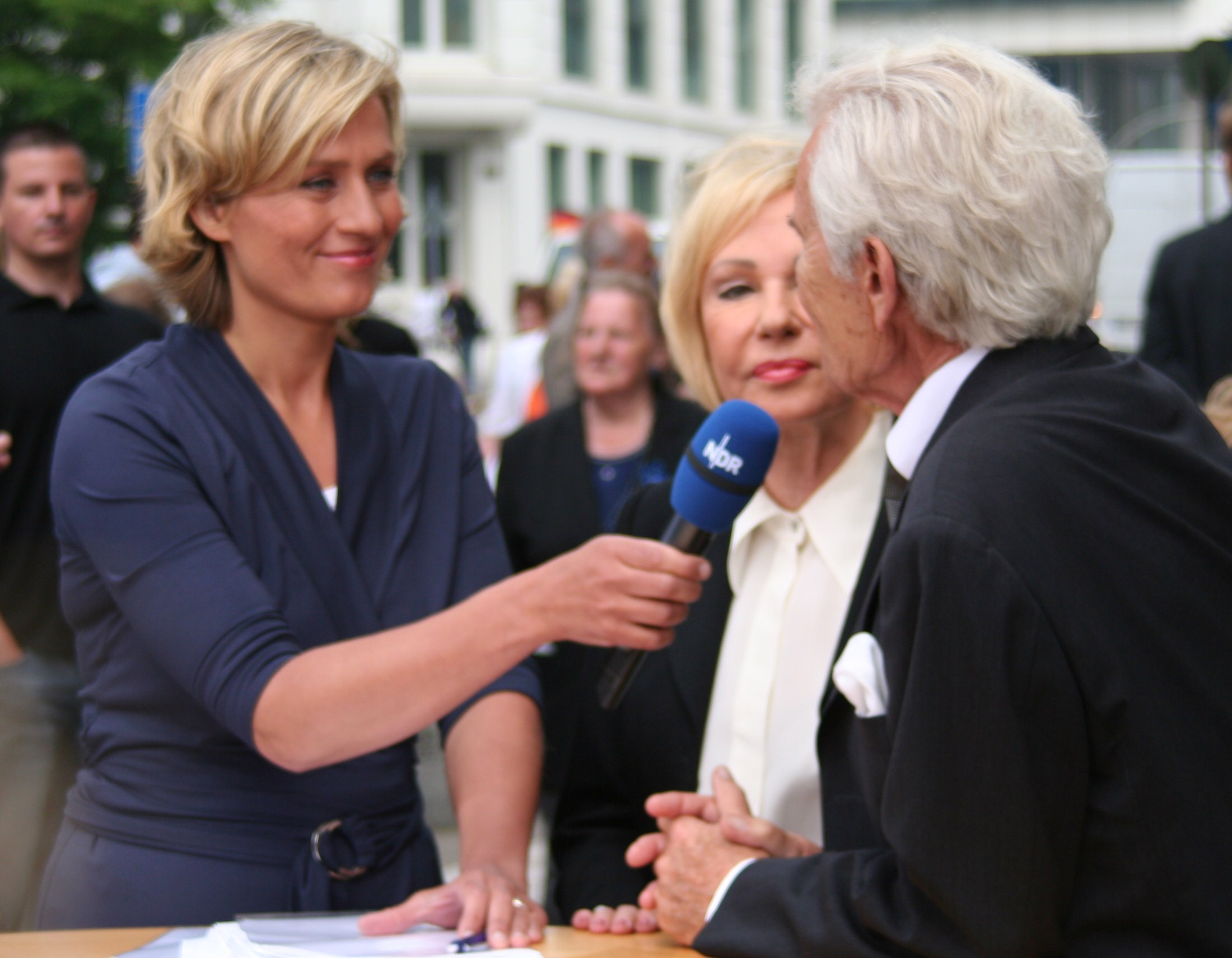
Susanne Stichler, Dagmar Berghoff and Wilhelm Wieben

=== Chief anchors ===
- Karl-Heinz Köpcke (1964–1987; newsreader from 1959)
- Werner Veigel (1987–1995; newsreader from 1966)
- Dagmar Berghoff (1995–1999; newsreader from 1976)
- Jo Brauner (2000–2004; newsreader from 1974)
- Jan Hofer (2004–2020; newsreader from 1985)
- Jens Riewa (2020–present; newsreader from 1994)

=== Current presenters ===
- Jens Riewa, since 1994^{†}
- Susanne Daubner, since 1999^{†}
- Thorsten Schröder, since 2000^{†}
- Susanne Holst, since 2001
- Michail Paweletz since 2004
- Julia-Niharika Sen, since 2018^{†}

=== Former presenters ===
in alphabetical order

- Ellen Arnhold 1987–2015^{†}
- Marc Bator, 2001–2013^{†}
- Ina Bergmann, 1997–2001
- Dagmar Berghoff, 1976–1999^{†}
- Claus-Erich Boetzkes, 1995-2021^{†}
- Jo Brauner, 1974–2004^{†}
- Elfi Marten-Brockmann, 1981–1984
- Lothar Dombrowski, 1967–1974^{†}
- Laura Dünnwald, 2001–2010^{†}
- Klaus Eckert, 1978–1983^{†}
- Karl Fleischer, 1960–1994^{†}
- Caroline Hamann, 2007–2009^{†}
- Jan Thilo Haux
- Eva Herman, 1989–2007^{†}
- Jan Hofer, 1985–2020^{†}
- Georg Hopf, 1975–1985
- Horst Jaedicke
- Silke Jürgensen, 2002–2005
- Karolin Kandler 2018–2022
- Karl-Heinz Köpcke 1959–1987^{†}
- Franz Laake, 1988–1993
- Judith Rakers, 2005–2024^{†}
- Siegmar Ruhmland, 1960–1963
- Diether von Sallwitz, 1959–1963
- Manfred Schmidt, 1962–1964
- Constantin Schreiber, 2017–2025^{†}
- Robert Schröder, 1988
- Susan Stahnke, 1992–1999^{†}
- Wilhelm Stöck 1965–1984^{†}
- Martin Svoboda
- Harry Teubner, 1978–1980
- Martin Thon
- Werner Veigel, 1966–1995^{†}
- Astrid Vits, 2004–2018
- Cay Dietrich Voss, 1952–1962
- Wilhelm Wieben, 1972–1998^{†}
- Daniela Witte, 1985–1988^{†}
- Günter Wiatrek, 1974–1975
- Claus Wunderlich, 1959–1962
- Tarek Youzbachi, 2004–2021
- Linda Zervakis, 2010–2021^{†}

† The person who is/was currently or previously anchoring in the main 15-minute newscast of Tagesschau.

== Awards ==
- 1987: Goldene Kamera best TV anchorwoman for Dagmar Berghoff
- 1997: Goldenes Kabel Publikumspreis in Silber for the best news broadcast
- 2000: Deutscher Comedypreis special award for unvoluntary comedy
- 2003: Bayerischer Filmpreis special award for the best editorial teams during 50 years
- 2012: Grimme Online Award for the "Tagesschau" app
- 2014: Eyes and Ears Award for the new studio design, animations and graphic techniques.

== Media studies and criticism ==
=== Plurality of perspectives lacking ===
The long-term study of the Otto Brenner Stiftung by Hans-Jürgen Arlt and Wolfgang Storz from March 2010 on "Business Journalism during the crisis - The mass media handling of the financial market policy" analyzed working methods of the news broadcasts from 1999 to fall 2009, especially in news formats like Tagesschau and Tagesthemen. The study ended with these formats failing during the crisis due to the editorial team's lack of different perspectives, focusing solely on representatives of the German government, banks, some scientists, and their points of view. "This narrowing of perspective leads to severe losses of reality which is to be considered as serious journalistic misconduct".

=== Bias in covering the Ukraine Crisis (2013–2014) ===
In September 2014, following a critical review from the editorial council (Programmbeirat), ARD-aktuell stated: "Criticism of our news-coverage respecting Ukraine has caused an echo on a hitherto unprecedented scale".

=== Bias in covering criminal incidents involving refugees ===
In the case of the 2016 murder of Maria Ladenburger by an Afghan refugee, Tagesschau did not report the case in its main edition on 3 December, claiming it was of only "regional significance" and that "the special protection for juveniles" would apply in this case. Public broadcaster ZDF had carried the story. Tagesschau's reasons for not reporting it were subjected to criticism, Stern magazine wrote that they had given an "absurd" explanation for their "ignorance". Two days later, ARD magazine Tagesthemen started to report about the case after public pressure. When chancellor Angela Merkel was asked about the case during the program, she stated: "If the fact should prove true that an Afghan refugee is responsible, then we should absolutely condemn this, exactly as in the case of any other murderer, and we should clearly name this." ARD announced their intent to engage a "quality manager" henceforth to deal with the growing public criticism of their decisions.

In the case of the 2017 murder of 15-year-old Mia V. by an Afghan refugee, unlike other German TV news broadcasters, Tagesschau did not report the case at first. Only after public pressure Tagesschau featured the incident in its main edition.
