= Werner Veigel =

Journalist and news presenter

- Born: 9 November 1928; The Hague, Netherlands
- Died: 2 May 1995 (aged 66); Munich, Germany
- Occupations: Journalist, news presenter

Werner Veigel (9 November 1928 – 2 May 1995) was a Dutch-born German journalist and news presenter.

== Early life and education ==
Veigel was born in The Hague on November 9, 1928, the son of a German salesman. After his education, he successfully completed a sales traineeship for a travel agency. When Radio Hilversum sought an announcer in 1950, Veigel applied and was given the position. In February 1954, he moved to the NWDR, where he was employed as a presenter and newsreader. From 1961 onward he also worked as an announcer and host on television.

== Journalism career ==
In 1966, Veigel became a narrator on the Tagesschau, the oldest and the most watched news bulletin on German television. In 1987, Tagesschau promoted him to the role of chief newsreader, succeeding Karl-Heinz Köpcke. He was considered exemplary in terms of his faultlessness in emphasis, presentation and articulation.

He commentated on the 1978 Eurovision Song Contest for ARD, and in 1980 played himself in Udo Lindenberg film Panic Time. In 1985, Veigel spoke the samples for a German version of Paul Hardcastle's single "19" which reached Number 1 in Germany.

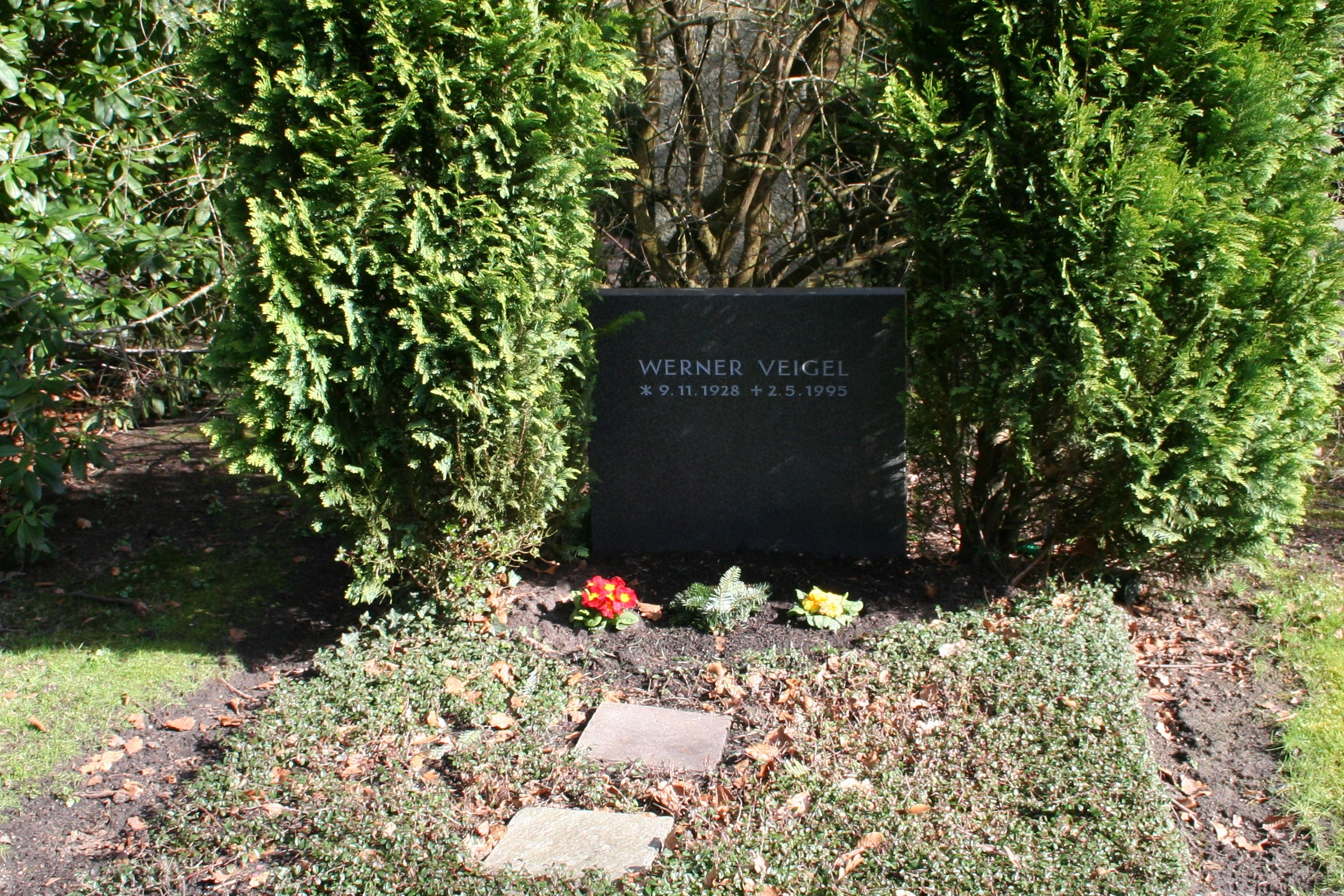
Veigel's tombstone is marked at Ohlsdorf Cemetery in Hamburg

== Later life ==
In January 1995, Veigel had to give up his position on the Tagesschau due to his declining health. In a magazine interview given the following month he came out as gay; he had lived with his partner Carlheinz Faust since 1955.

Veigel died on 2 May 1995 as a result of a brain tumour. He is buried in Ohlsdorf Cemetery in Hamburg.

== Literature ==
- Dagmar Berghoff, Wilhelm Wieben, Werner Veigel: Rezepte und Geschichten aus 2000 Plattenkisten. Kuhle L. Verlag, 1987
