= Susanne Daubner =

German news and television presenter (born 1961)

- Born: 26 March 1961 (age 65); Halle (Saale), East Germany
- Occupations: News and television presenter
- Years active: 1987–present

Susanne Daubner (born 26 March 1961) is a German news and television presenter. She has been part of the Tagesschau news team since 1999. Previously, Daubner had worked for Rundfunk der DDR, DT64 and Ostdeutscher Rundfunk Brandenburg.

== Biography ==
Daubner was born on 26 March 1961 in Halle (Saale river). After graduating from high school, she first completed commercial training and was then employed as a speaker and presenter by the radio organisation Rundfunk der DDR. Her talent was discovered on the East Berlin streets while an open day of radio and television was being held. In 1987, Daubner was made a newscaster and presenter of the youth-oriented radio station DT64.

While living in East Germany, she lived in the East Berlin district of Prenzlauer Berg. After an unsuccessful intervention by the Ministry of State Security (Stasi) who wanted to recruit her that same year, Daubner elected to escape from East Germany in the summer of 1989 and went to Hungary and SFR Yugoslavia. She later stated in 2008 that she felt a great need for freedom, due to her feeling restricted. Following her escape, she worked for Radio Freies Berlin (Radio Free Berlin) as a news and programme spokesperson. Daubner made her first on-screen appearance for Ostdeutscher Rundfunk Brandenburg in a broadcast called Brandenburg Aktuell in 1992. Then, she rejoined Radio Free Berlin in 1997. She joined the German national public broadcasters ARD, and joined the Tagesschau news team in January 1999 replacing Wilhelm Wieben.

She has a daughter born in 1990, and was divorced ten years later. Daubner also acts as a spokesperson on television and is a moderator on radio.
