= Susan Stahnke =

German TV presenter (born 1967)

Susan Stahnke (born 7 September 1967) is a German TV presenter. She was born in Hamelin, Germany.

== Career ==
Stahnke was a presenter at the age of 24. She worked for the federal broadcaster NDR (Northern Germany's Broadcast) before she worked as a regular news reader for the national German news show Tagesschau for seven years.

Currently she presents a TV format called Tischgespräch where she has already interviewed guests such as Hardy Krüger and Franz Beckenbauer.
