= Claus-Erich Boetzkes =

German journalist and television moderator

- Born: 29 March 1956 (age 70); Memmingen, Bavaria, West Germany
- Education: LMU Munich
- Occupations: Journalist; Television moderator

Claus-Erich Boetzkes (born 29 March 1956) is a German journalist and television moderator.

== Career ==
Born in Memmingen, Bavaria, Boetzkes studied communication science, political science, sociology and economics at LMU Munich. In 2007, he did his doctorate at the TU Ilmenau on the subject of Organisation als Nachrichtenfaktor (Organization as a News Factor). Today he is also a lecturer at this university. Due to his teaching activities and his academic achievements, he was appointed honorary professor in 2011. There he is researching, among other things, with the help of the eye tracking technique eye tracking on the retention and understanding performance of viewers of TV news. In 2019, he published a study on the effect of background images on the Tagesschau, which sometimes distracts considerably from the content. In addition, Boetzkes teaches an English-language elective module on fake news at the Faculty of Economics and Media at the TU Ilmenau.

Boetzkes completed his professional and practical training at the Deutsche Journalistenschule. While still a student, he was a freelancer for the Munich Abendzeitung. From 1980 he worked as an author and moderator for the science department of the Bayerischer Rundfunk. He received the Kurt-Magnus-Preis for a radio report on a kidney transplant. Later he moderated, among other things, the political talk show Espresso on Mitteldeutscher Rundfunk (MDR) and the ARD-Mittagsmagazin.

In 1983, the BR-Hörfunk hired him as an editor in the economic department. Two years later he became head of music and, in 1989, head of entertainment. Together with the pop singer Nicole Seibert he commented on the Eurovision Song Contest in Dublin in 1988. During his tenure, there were serious upheavals in radio as private program providers came onto the market. In response, Boetzkes introduced today's standard format radio and computer-aided music selection. From 1990 to 1992 he was the sole responsible program manager at Bayern 3, having previously been program manager for the weekend and Thomas Gottschalk program manager during the week.

After switching to television, Boetzkes went to ARD-aktuell in Hamburg for Bayerischer Rundfunk. There he presented the newly introduced Nachtmagazin on ARD from 1995 to 1997. From 1997 to 2021, he presented the newly created moderated Tagesschau bulletin in the afternoon, since 2001 in weekly rotation with his colleague Susanne Holst until 30 December 2021. On 11 September 2001, he hosted the first Tagesschau broadcasts, including the 8 p.m. edition after the September 11 attacks. He also anchored another 8 p.m. edition tagesschau on 7 October 2001.

He also moderated editions of the consumer program Ohne Gewähr together with Anka Zink and Philipp Sonntag. Before that, he moderated the Bayern quiz Bayern gewinnt for some time.

== Personal life ==
Boetzkes is married for the second time and has three children. He lives in Hamburg.
