= ARD-aktuell =

Central ARD television newsroom since 1977

Logo of ARD-aktuell

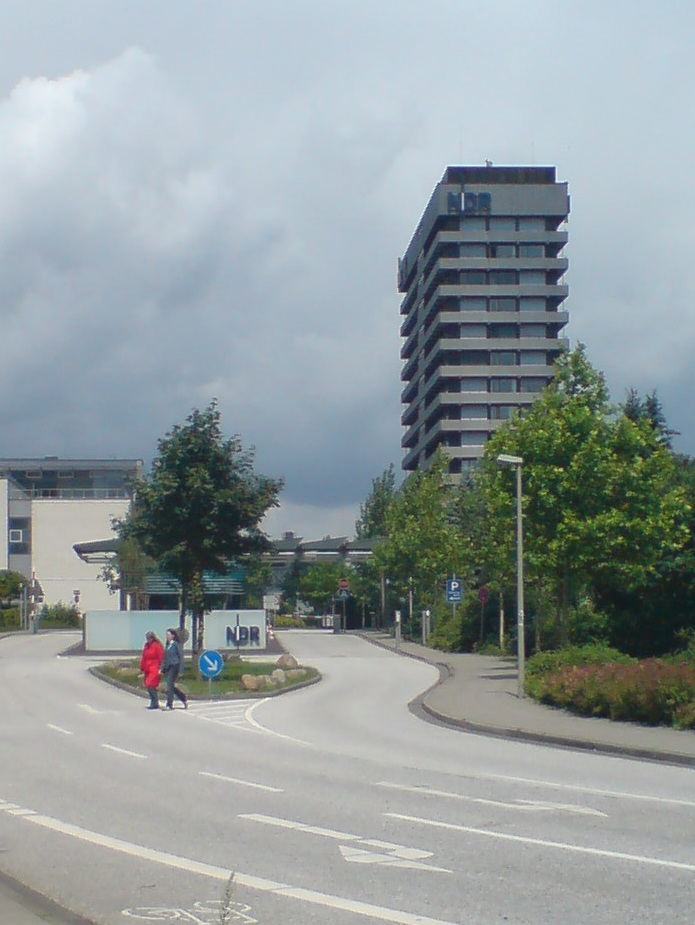
Headquarters of ARD-aktuell: House 18 at the NDR in Hamburg-Lokstedt (left)

Tagesschau

Tagesthemen

Nachtmagazin

Wochenspiegel

ARD-aktuell has been the central television newsroom of the ARD since 1977.

ARD-aktuell is a joint institution of the ARD. It is located at NDR (Norddeutscher Rundfunk) in Hamburg-Lokstedt. The basis of the work of ARD-aktuell is an administrative agreement of all nine ARD institutions, which defines the organization of the editorial office and the basic structure of the programs.

ARD-aktuell produces Tagesschau, Tagesthemen and the news broadcasts of the television channel tagesschau24. They previously produced the wochenspiegel (1953-2014) and the nachtmagazin (1995-2022). All formats are broadcast live. At ARD-aktuell, about 300 employees work in editorial and production. The editorial board is divided into two major areas: a planning team develops the program ideas and organizes contributions and live connections. The broadcasting team is responsible for the content of the broadcasts.

== Editors of ARD-aktuell ==
Since October 2019 Marcus Bornheim is the chief editor of the newsroom, which must be elected by the ARD directors with a two-thirds majority.

Editors	Years
Dieter Gütt	1978–1980
Edmund Gruber	1981–1988
Henning Röhl	1988–1991
Gerhard Fuchs	1991–1993
Ulrich Deppendorf	1993–1998
Bernhard Wabnitz	1999–2005
Kai Gniffke	2006–2019
Marcus Bornheim	2019–present
