= Jan Hofer =

German broadcast newsreader and television presenter

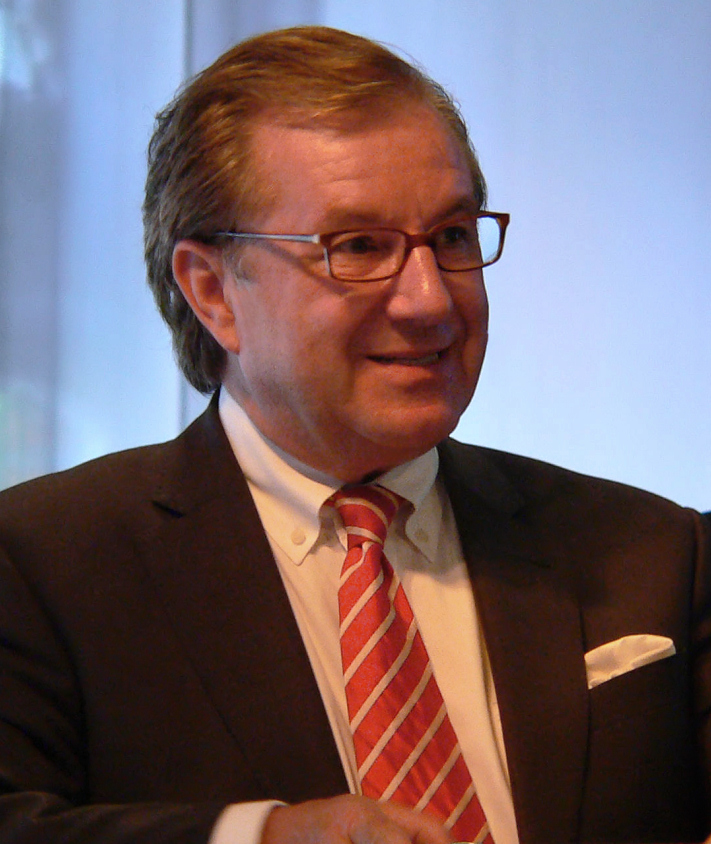
- Born: Büderich, West Germany
- Occupation: Television presenter
- Years active: 1970–2020, 2021–2024

Jan Hofer (born 31 January 1952 (Note: His exact birth year has been subject of speculation as being somewhere between 1950 and 1954.)) is a German broadcast newsreader and television presenter. He was a well-known and popular reader of the news programme Tagesschau on Das Erste. Hofer was the chief reader on Tagesschau from 2004 until December 2020, having been a newsreader on that programme since 1985. Since leaving Tagesschau, he has been lead anchorman for RTL Direkt.

== Biography ==
Born in Büderich (now part of Wesel), Hofer grew up in Wesel and studied business economics in Cologne between 1970 and 1974. During his studies, he gained initial experience as intern at a radio station.

Following his studies, he worked at various regional radio and TV stations before joining the Tagesschau in 1985. He became the chief reader in 2004.

In addition to his work as news anchor, Hofer hosted the NDR Talk Show from 1989 to 1991. Following this, he was the German commentator of the Eurovision Song Contest from 1992 to 1994. On the regional station MDR he also hosted the talk show Riverboat between 1992 and 2012.

Hofer has four children. In 2018, he married his long-time partner Phong Lan, with whom he has a son (b. 2015).

In summer 2021, Hofer became the lead anchorman for RTL's new news program RTL Direkt.
