= Jo Brauner =

German former news anchorman (born 1937)

- Born: Joachim Brauner; 29 November 1937 (age 88); Nimptsch, Lower Silesia, Germany (now Niemcza, Poland)
- Occupations: Journalist, Talk show

Joachim "Jo" Brauner (born 29 November 1937) is a German former news anchorman and journalist.

== Life ==
During the Second World War, Brauner was evacuated in January 1945 with his mother and three siblings from Breslau (Wroclaw) to Saale in Thuringia. In 1958 he took a state exam to be a school teacher of German in the Pedagogical Institute in Leipzig. In August 1958 he escaped from East Germany via West Berlin to the Federal Republic of Germany. In the following years he worked in Hamburg, among others, in a graphic arts institute, and later as a clerk in an insurance company.

He started working for ARD television in 1974.

On 9 October 2004 Brauner was on ARD for the last time, ending a thirty-year career working for the newscast. As part of the ARD-theme week 2008, he spoke on 21 April 2008 in the ARD television once again on recurring messages every half hour on the news.

As a football fan, Brauner was a longtime announcer at HSV and at the annual event, the International Tennis Championships for men and women at Hamburg Rothenbaum. The function of the HSV stadium announcer was on him.

Brauner is currently news anchor at TV AOK Health vigo format. Since November 2009, Brauner is an official sponsor of the Bethel Children's hospice for dying children.

== Personal life ==
Brauner has been married since 1969 and has two daughters.
