= Karl-Heinz Köpcke =

German news speaker (1922–1991)

- Born: 29 September 1922; Hamburg, Weimar Republic
- Died: 27 September 1991 (aged 68); Hamburg, Germany
- Occupations: Journalist, Television presenter

Karl-Heinz Köpcke (29 September 1922 – 27 September 1991) was a German television presenter and newsreader.

== Life ==
Köpcke wanted to make a commercial training in his hometown of Hamburg, when he was drafted in 1941 to the Reichsarbeitsdienst. As a member of the Luftwaffe, Köpcke was captured by the French in 1945; he was freed in 1946.

He first went to Radio Bremen, before going to Hamburg in 1949 to take up a position as a radio announcer for the NWDR channel. His long-term presence on the screen – he was a newsreader on the Tagesschau bulletins from 2 March 1959 to 10 September 1987 – earned him the nickname Mr. Tagesschau . He was the chief newsreader from 1964.

In 1978, the Tagesthemen news analysis programme was introduced, in which the newsreader played a background role to the main presenter. During the first broadcast, Köpcke protested by demonstratively shuffling his papers and by coughing.

In German-speaking countries, he set standards for the appearance and operation of newscasters. He died four years after his retirement at the age of 68 years from cancer just two days short to his 69th birthday, shortly after the death of his wife, broadcasting colleague Gertie Kelkenberg. They married in 1948.

His grave is located in Hamburg at the Cemetery Ohlsdorf.

== Literature ==
- Schädlich, Jörg (2014). Das Karl-Heinz-Köpcke-Buch (in German). Berlin. ISBN 978-3-86386-736-2. OCLC 888466841.
