= Tagesschau24 =

German free-to-air television news channel

- Country: Germany
- Broadcast area: Germany
- Headquarters: Hamburg/Potsdam, Germany

Programming
- Picture format: 720p HDTV (exclusively in HD)

Ownership
- Owner: ARD
- Sister channels: Das Erste; NDR Fernsehen; One; ARD-alpha

History
- Launched: 30 August 1997; 29 years ago
- Closed: January 1, 2027; 49 days' time
- Former names: EinsExtra (1997–2012)

Links
- Website: www.tagesschau24.de

Availability

Terrestrial
- Digital terrestrial television: Channel varies depending on location

Streaming media
- Tagesschau.de: German-Only livestream International livestream

Tagesschau24 ([ˈtaːɡəs.ʃaʊ̯ fiːɐ̯ ʊn ˈt͡sʋansɪç] stylized as tagesschau24) is a German free-to-air television channel owned by ARD and managed by Norddeutscher Rundfunk (NDR). Launched on 30 August 1997 as "EinsExtra", the channel was renamed Tagesschau 24 on 1 May 2012, becoming a brand extension of ARD's evening newscast.

It is ARD's news channel and competes with Welt and n-tv. Besides news, Tagesschau24 also broadcasts culture, sports and science shows. A HD simulcast of the channel was launched on 5 December 2013.

== History ==
The ARD digital broadcaster started on 30 August 1997 as EinsExtra. It was positioned as information channel. Until 2006, the network's programming consisted largely of re-airings of morning shows, talk shows and documentaries from Das Erste and the regional public broadcasters. From 2006 to 2009, the channel was an all news network, with the launch of a news-centred show, EinsExtra Aktuell. On 1 May 2012, EinsExtra Aktuell was renamed tagesschau24, taking its name from Das Erste's flagship evening newscast.

In February 2022, it was announced that ARD would convert tagesschau24 into a 24/7 news channel by 2023.

On November 15, 2022, tagesschau24 closed its SDTV cable and satellite feeds, which means it is now only available in HD.

In March 2026, it was announced that ARD and ZDF would consolidate their respective digital networks into a joint portfolio; as part of this move, tagesschau24 is expected to close in 2027, with Phoenix becoming the main news and information channel of the partnership.

== Logos ==
1997 to 2005

2005 to 2012

Since May 2012

HD logo, 2012 to 2025

In May 2014, the "tagesschau" and the ARD trademark were deleted from the logo. For the HD variant, "HD" is below the 24 in the semicircle, it was removed in 2025, because channel is only HD.

== Audience share ==
=== Germany ===
	January	February	March	April	May	June	July	August	September	October	November	December	Annual average
2017	0.3%	0.3%	0.3%	0.3%	0.3%	0.3%	0.3%	0.3%	0.3%	0.3%	0.3%	0.3%	0.3%
2018	0.3%	0.3%	0.3%	0.3%	0.3%	0.3%	0.4%	0.4%	0.3%	0.3%	0.3%	0.4%	0.3%
2019	0.3%	0.3%	0.3%	0.3%	0.3%	0.4%	0.4%	0.3%	0.3%	0.3%	0.3%	0.3%	0.3%
