= Dagmar Berghoff =

German radio and television presenter

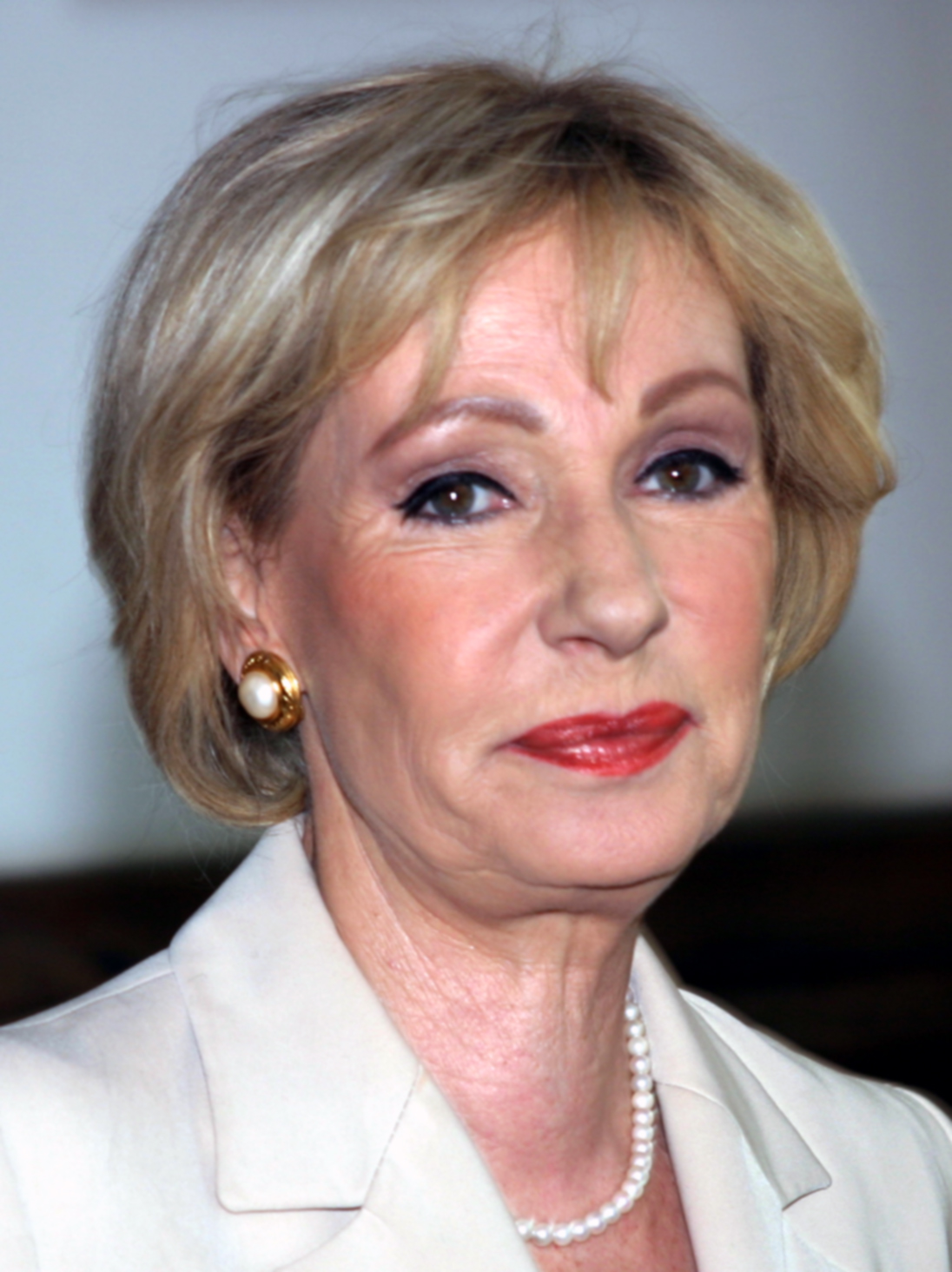
- Berghoff
- Born: 25 January 1943 (age 83); Berlin, Germany
- Occupations: Journalist, Actress, Presenter

Dagmar Berghoff (born 25 January 1943) is a German radio and television presenter. Originally an actress, she became known as a reader of the evening news for ARD.

== Biography ==
The Berlin-born Berghoff moved with her family to Ahrensburg, near Hamburg in 1946, and 1957 to Hamburg-Harburg. After leaving school she studied from 1964 to 1967 at the Hochschule für Musik und Theater Hamburg. After working from 1967 to 1976 at the Southwest Radio Baden-Baden as a television presenter, radio presenter and speaker, she returned to Hamburg in 1975 and worked at the NDR radio.

On 16 June 1976, she began reading the evening news of ARD on television, a position she held until her retirement on the eve of the new millennium. A trained actress, she appeared in theaters and on television series during her time as a newsreader, various music programs and the NDR Talkshow.

In 1983, she spoke on the Atari cassette Programming Made Easy – An Introduction to BASIC with Dagmar Berghoff. She has lent her voice since then several audiobook productions.

== Private life ==
Berghoff was born with ectrodactyly of the left hand, a fact that remained hidden to most audiences for decades thanks to the way she positioned it, mostly covering it up with the sheets of paper she read from during news broadcasts.

== Works ==
- Zeit für mehr. Erinnerungen und Einsichten (Autobiographie). Langen Müller, München 1999, ISBN 3-7844-2764-2
- Dagmar Berghoff liest Weihnachtsgeschichten von Theodor Storm (Hörbuch). Audio-CD 2001, ISBN 3-89882-007-6
- Zum Weihnachtsfest. Geschichten mit Hintergedanken (ausgewählt von Dagmar Berghoff). Gütersloher Verlagshaus, Gütersloh 2006, ISBN 3-579-07208-0
