= Germany in the Eurovision Song Contest 2021 =

- Eurovision Song Contest 2021
- Participating broadcaster: ARD (Note: Arbeitsgemeinschaft der öffentlich-rechtlichen Rundfunkanstalten der Bundesrepublik Deutschland) – Norddeutscher Rundfunk (NDR)
- Country: Germany
- Selection process: Internal selection
- Announcement date: Artist: 6 February 2021; Song: 25 February 2021

Competing entry
- Song: "I Don't Feel Hate"
- Artist: Jendrik
- Songwriters: Jendrik Sigwart; Christoph Oswald

Placement
- Final result: 25th, 3 points

Participation chronology

Germany was represented at the Eurovision Song Contest 2021 with the song "I Don't Feel Hate", written by Jendrik Sigwart and Christoph Oswald, and performed by Jendrik himself. The German participating broadcaster on behalf of ARD, Norddeutscher Rundfunk (NDR), selected its entry through a multi-stage internal selection.

== Background ==
Prior to the 2021 Contest, ARD has participated in the Eurovision Song Contest representing Germany 63 times since its debut at the inaugural contest in 1956. Germany has won the contest on two occasions: in 1982 with the song "Ein bißchen Frieden" performed by Nicole and in 2010 with the song "Satellite" performed by Lena. Germany, to this point, has been noted for having competed in the contest more than any other country; they have competed in every contest since the first edition in 1956 except for the 1996 contest when the nation was eliminated in a pre-contest elimination round. In 2018, the German entry "You Let Me Walk Alone" performed by Michael Schulte placed fourth of twenty-six competing songs with 340 points. In 2019, the duo S!sters with the song "Sister" finished in 25th place with 24 points, receiving nul points from the televote. In 2020, Ben Dolic was set to represent Germany with the song "Violent Thing" before the contest's cancellation.

As part of its duties as participating broadcaster, ARD organises the selection of its entry in the Eurovision Song Contest and broadcasts the event in the country. Since 1996, ARD has delegated the participation in the contest to its member Norddeutscher Rundfunk (NDR). In 2018, the multi-artist national final Unser Lied für Lissabon determined both the song and performer to compete at Eurovision for Germany. In 2019, NDR organised a national final with the same procedure, Unser Lied für Israel. In 2020, NDR opted for a multi-stage internal selection, appointing two independent jury panels to select their entry.

== Before Eurovision ==
=== Internal selection ===
On 6 February 2021, NDR confirmed that Jendrik Sigwart will represent Germany in the 2021 contest. The song, entitled "I Don't Feel Hate", was released on 25 February 2021.

== At Eurovision ==
The Eurovision Song Contest 2021 took place at Rotterdam Ahoy in Rotterdam, Netherlands, and consisted of two semi-finals held on 18 and 20 May, and the grand final on 22 May 2021. As Germany is a member of the Big Five, their entry directly qualified for the final, along with France, Italy, Spain, the United Kingdom, and host country the Netherlands. In addition to their participation in the final, Germany was also required to broadcast and vote in one of the two semi-finals.

Germany performed 15th in the grand final on 22 May 2021, following Moldova and preceding Finland. The final was watched by 6.53 million viewers in Germany, which meant a market share of 26.7 per cent.

=== Voting ===
Voting during the three shows involved each country awarding two sets of points from 1-8, 10 and 12: one from their professional jury and the other from televoting. Each nation's jury consisted of five music industry professionals who are citizens of the country they represent, with a diversity in gender and age represented. The judges assess each entry based on the performances during the second Dress Rehearsal of each show, which takes place the night before each live show, against a set of criteria including: vocal capacity; the stage performance; the song's composition and originality; and the overall impression by the act. Jury members may only take part in panel once every three years, and are obliged to confirm that they are not connected to any of the participating acts in a way that would impact their ability to vote impartially. Jury members should also vote independently, with no discussion of their vote permitted with other jury members. The exact composition of the professional jury, and the results of each country's jury and televoting were released after the grand final; the individual results from each jury member were also released in an anonymised form.

==== Points awarded to Germany ====
Points awarded to Germany (Final)
| Score | Televote | Jury |
|---|---|---|
| 12 points | | |
| 10 points | | |
| 8 points | | |
| 7 points | | |
| 6 points | | |
| 5 points | | |
| 4 points | | |
| 3 points | | |
| 2 points | | Austria |
| 1 point | | Romania |

==== Points awarded by Germany ====
Points awarded by Germany (Semi-final 1)
| Score | Televote | Jury |
|---|---|---|
| 12 points | Lithuania | Sweden |
| 10 points | Ukraine | Malta |
| 8 points | Malta | Ukraine |
| 7 points | Croatia | Russia |
| 6 points | Russia | Romania |
| 5 points | Israel | Cyprus |
| 4 points | Norway | Lithuania |
| 3 points | Belgium | Israel |
| 2 points | Azerbaijan | Croatia |
| 1 point | Cyprus | Australia |

Points awarded by Germany (Final)
| Score | Televote | Jury |
|---|---|---|
| 12 points | Lithuania | France |
| 10 points | France | Switzerland |
| 8 points | Finland | Malta |
| 7 points | Italy | Cyprus |
| 6 points | Iceland | Italy |
| 5 points | Russia | Ukraine |
| 4 points | Ukraine | Sweden |
| 3 points | Serbia | Iceland |
| 2 points | Switzerland | Russia |
| 1 point | Norway | Lithuania |

==== Detailed voting results ====
The following members comprised the German jury:

- Matthias Arfmann
- Uwe Kanthak
- Ivy Quainoo
- Janin Ullmann
- Constantin Zöller

Detailed voting results from Germany (Semi-final 1)
| R/O | Country | Jury | | | | | | | Televote | |
| R/O | Country | Juror A | Juror B | Juror C | Juror D | Juror E | Rank | Points | Rank | Points |
|---|---|---|---|---|---|---|---|---|---|---|
| 01 | Lithuania | 10 | 4 | 6 | 4 | 14 | 7 | 4 | 1 | 12 |
| 02 | Slovenia | 16 | 14 | 13 | 11 | 8 | 16 | | 16 | |
| 03 | Russia | 14 | 9 | 5 | 3 | 1 | 4 | 7 | 5 | 6 |
| 04 | Sweden | 1 | 5 | 1 | 6 | 10 | 1 | 12 | 11 | |
| 05 | Australia | 5 | 11 | 16 | 15 | 3 | 10 | 1 | 15 | |
| 06 | North Macedonia | 15 | 15 | 3 | 13 | 12 | 13 | | 14 | |
| 07 | Ireland | 13 | 6 | 12 | 14 | 4 | 12 | | 13 | |
| 08 | Cyprus | 11 | 1 | 4 | 10 | 13 | 6 | 5 | 10 | 1 |
| 09 | Norway | 12 | 12 | 9 | 9 | 15 | 15 | | 7 | 4 |
| 10 | Croatia | 9 | 8 | 8 | 5 | 9 | 9 | 2 | 4 | 7 |
| 11 | Belgium | 7 | 10 | 15 | 7 | 11 | 14 | | 8 | 3 |
| 12 | Israel | 6 | 7 | 7 | 12 | 6 | 8 | 3 | 6 | 5 |
| 13 | Romania | 3 | 16 | 2 | 16 | 5 | 5 | 6 | 12 | |
| 14 | Azerbaijan | 8 | 3 | 11 | 8 | 16 | 11 | | 9 | 2 |
| 15 | Ukraine | 4 | 13 | 14 | 1 | 2 | 3 | 8 | 2 | 10 |
| 16 | Malta | 2 | 2 | 10 | 2 | 7 | 2 | 10 | 3 | 8 |

Detailed voting results from Germany (Final)
| R/O | Country | Jury | | | | | | | Televote | |
| R/O | Country | Juror A | Juror B | Juror C | Juror D | Juror E | Rank | Points | Rank | Points |
|---|---|---|---|---|---|---|---|---|---|---|
| 01 | Cyprus | 8 | 1 | 4 | 16 | 6 | 4 | 7 | 19 | |
| 02 | Albania | 25 | 22 | 23 | 18 | 21 | 23 | | 16 | |
| 03 | Israel | 10 | 11 | 12 | 22 | 10 | 14 | | 18 | |
| 04 | Belgium | 5 | 19 | 19 | 6 | 15 | 11 | | 21 | |
| 05 | Russia | 11 | 12 | 2 | 9 | 9 | 9 | 2 | 6 | 5 |
| 06 | Malta | 2 | 4 | 11 | 1 | 7 | 3 | 8 | 12 | |
| 07 | Portugal | 21 | 6 | 14 | 14 | 14 | 12 | | 11 | |
| 08 | Serbia | 22 | 21 | 24 | 17 | 11 | 21 | | 8 | 3 |
| 09 | United Kingdom | 20 | 23 | 9 | 23 | 25 | 20 | | 24 | |
| 10 | Greece | 13 | 20 | 21 | 20 | 23 | 22 | | 14 | |
| 11 | Switzerland | 12 | 5 | 1 | 4 | 2 | 2 | 10 | 9 | 2 |
| 12 | Iceland | 4 | 9 | 8 | 5 | 12 | 8 | 3 | 5 | 6 |
| 13 | Spain | 24 | 25 | 22 | 25 | 24 | 25 | | 22 | |
| 14 | Moldova | 18 | 24 | 25 | 21 | 22 | 24 | | 25 | |
| 15 | Germany | | | | | | | | | |
| 16 | Finland | 7 | 17 | 13 | 19 | 18 | 18 | | 3 | 8 |
| 17 | Bulgaria | 23 | 7 | 10 | 15 | 20 | 16 | | 15 | |
| 18 | Lithuania | 9 | 8 | 5 | 8 | 13 | 10 | 1 | 1 | 12 |
| 19 | Ukraine | 6 | 13 | 16 | 2 | 3 | 6 | 5 | 7 | 4 |
| 20 | France | 3 | 2 | 6 | 3 | 4 | 1 | 12 | 2 | 10 |
| 21 | Azerbaijan | 19 | 10 | 15 | 7 | 19 | 15 | | 17 | |
| 22 | Norway | 17 | 15 | 18 | 12 | 17 | 19 | | 10 | 1 |
| 23 | Netherlands | 15 | 16 | 17 | 24 | 5 | 13 | | 20 | |
| 24 | Italy | 16 | 3 | 7 | 13 | 1 | 5 | 6 | 4 | 7 |
| 25 | Sweden | 1 | 18 | 3 | 10 | 16 | 7 | 4 | 13 | |
| 26 | San Marino | 14 | 14 | 20 | 11 | 8 | 17 | | 23 | |
