= Australia in the Eurovision Song Contest 2021 =

- Eurovision Song Contest 2021
- Participating broadcaster: Special Broadcasting Service (SBS)
- Country: Australia
- Selection process: Internal selection
- Announcement date: Artist: 2 April 2020; Song: 4 March 2021

Competing entry
- Song: "Technicolour"
- Artist: Montaigne
- Songwriters: Jessica Cerro; Dave Hammer

Placement
- Semi-final result: Failed to qualify (14th)

Participation chronology

Australia was represented at the Eurovision Song Contest 2021 with the song "Technicolour", written by Montaigne and Dave Hammer, and performed by Montaigne. The Australian participating broadcaster, Special Broadcasting Service (SBS), internally selected its entry for the contest. Montaigne was due to compete in the 2020 contest with "Don't Break Me" before the 2020 event's cancellation. The song Montaigne would perform in 2021, "Technicolour", was presented to the public on 4 March 2021.

Australia debuted in the Eurovision Song Contest in 2015 by invitation from the European Broadcasting Union (EBU) as a "one-off" special guest to celebrate the 60th anniversary of Eurovision. On 17 November 2015, the EBU announced that SBS had been invited to participate in the 2016 contest and that Australia would once again take part. In 2015, Australia was guaranteed a spot in the final of the contest and was allowed to vote during both semi-finals and the final; however, from the 2016 contest and onwards, Australia would have to qualify to the final from one of two semi-finals and could only vote in the semi-final in which the nation was allocated to compete.

Australia was drawn to compete in the first semi-final of the Eurovision Song Contest which took place on 18 May 2021. Performing during the show in position 5, "Technicolour" was not announced among the top 10 entries of the first semi-final and therefore did not qualify to compete in the final, making it the first time that Australia failed to qualify to the final of the Eurovision Song Contest from a semi-final since their debut in 2015.

== Background ==
Special Broadcasting Service (SBS) has broadcast the Eurovision Song Contest since 1983, and the contest has gained a cult following over that time, primarily due to the country's strong political and cultural ties with Europe. Paying tribute to this, the 2014 contest semi-finals included an interval act featuring Australian singer Jessica Mauboy. Australian singers have also participated at Eurovision as representatives of other countries, including Olivia Newton-John (United Kingdom 1974), two-time winner Johnny Logan (Ireland 1980 and 1987), Gina G (United Kingdom 1996), and Jane Comerford as lead singer of Texas Lightning (Germany 2006).

Tying in with the goal of Eurovision—to showcase "the importance of bringing countries together to celebrate diversity, music and culture", the 2015 theme of "Building Bridges", and arguing that they could not hold "the world's biggest party" to celebrate the 60th edition of Eurovision without inviting Australia, the EBU announced on 10 February 2015 that the country would compete at that year's edition as a special guest participant. Along with the "Big Five" (France, Germany, Italy, Spain and the United Kingdom), and the host country of Austria, Australia was given automatic entry into the final to "not reduce the chances" of the semi-final participants. On 17 November 2015, the EBU announced that SBS had been invited to participate in the 2016 contest and that Australia would once again take part, however they would have to qualify for the final from one of two semi-finals and could only vote in the semi-final in which the nation was competing. On 12 February 2019, SBS confirmed Australia's participation in the 2021 Eurovision Song Contest after securing an invitation to participate until 2023. In 2019, Australia was represented by Kate Miller-Heidke and the song "Zero Gravity". The country ended in ninth place in the grand final with 284 points.

== Before Eurovision ==
=== Internal selection ===
Montaigne was confirmed as the artist that would represent Australia at the Eurovision Song Contest 2021 on 2 April 2020. Montaigne's Eurovision song, "Technicolour", was premiered on 4 March 2021 on Triple J, while the digital download release of the full song occurred on 5 March 2021 and the live performance occurred on 6 March 2021 during the Sydney Gay and Lesbian Mardi Gras 2021, broadcast on SBS as well as streamed online at SBS On Demand. The song was written by Montaigne along with Dave Hammer.

I initially started writing the song after a catch-up call with my mum that was really emotional and had me crying on the floor thinking of that first line, 'I want to be close to my mother.' The song became about resilience and the courage that comes from being able to be vulnerable, being able to ask for help, and knowing that in solidarity and togetherness we are stronger as people.

— Montaigne about "Technicolour"

== At Eurovision ==
According to Eurovision rules, all nations with the exceptions of the host country and the "Big Five" (France, Germany, Italy, Spain and the United Kingdom) are required to qualify from one of two semi-finals in order to compete in the final; the top ten countries from each semi-final progress to the final. The European Broadcasting Union (EBU) split up the competing countries into six different pots based on voting patterns from previous contests, with countries with favourable voting histories put into the same pot. For the 2021 contest, the semi-final allocation draw held for 2020 which was held on 28 January 2020, was used. Australia was placed into the first semi-final, which was held on 18 May 2021, and was scheduled to perform in the first half of the show.

Once all the competing songs for the 2021 contest had been released, the running order for the semi-finals was decided by the shows' producers rather than through another draw, so that similar songs were not placed next to each other. Australia was set to perform in position 5, following the entry from Sweden and preceding the entry from North Macedonia.

On 20 April 2021, it was confirmed that due to travel restrictions related to the COVID-19 pandemic in the country as international borders had been closed since March 2020, the Australian delegation would not be able to travel to Rotterdam as it would have to travel from Sydney to Amsterdam via a stopover in either Doha, Dubai, Abu Dhabi or Singapore, and they would be subject to 14-day quarantine period upon returning home to Australia. Thus Australia performed via its 'live-on-tape' recording, filmed at SBS's studios in Sydney.

At the end of the show, Australia was not announced among 10 qualifiers of the first semi-final and therefore did not qualify to compete in the final, making it the first time that Australia failed to qualify for the final of the Eurovision Song Contest since its debut in 2015.

=== Voting ===
Voting during the three shows involved each country awarding two sets of points from 1-8, 10 and 12: one from their professional jury and the other from televoting. Each nation's jury consisted of five music industry professionals who are citizens of the country they represent, with a diversity in gender and age represented. The judges assess each entry based on the performances during the second Dress Rehearsal of each show, which takes place the night before each live show, against a set of criteria including: vocal capacity; the stage performance; the song's composition and originality; and the overall impression by the act. Jury members may only take part in panel once every three years, and are obliged to confirm that they are not connected to any of the participating acts in a way that would impact their ability to vote impartially. Jury members should also vote independently, with no discussion of their vote permitted with other jury members. The exact composition of the professional jury, and the results of each country's jury and televoting were released after the grand final; the individual results from each jury member were also released in an anonymised form.

==== Points awarded to Australia ====
Points awarded to Australia (Semi-final 1)
Score	Televote	Jury
12 points		Ukraine
10 points		
8 points		Lithuania
7 points		
6 points		
5 points		
4 points		
3 points		
2 points		Croatia; Romania
1 point	Russia; Ukraine	Germany; Russia

==== Points awarded by Australia ====
Points awarded by Australia (Semi-final 1)
Score	Televote	Jury
12 points	Ukraine	Malta
10 points	Malta	Cyprus
8 points	Lithuania	Israel
7 points	Russia	Russia
6 points	Cyprus	Sweden
5 points	Croatia	Azerbaijan
4 points	Israel	Ukraine
3 points	Norway	Ireland
2 points	Ireland	Lithuania
1 point	Azerbaijan	Norway

Points awarded by Australia (Final)
Score	Televote	Jury
12 points	Iceland	Malta
10 points	Ukraine	Switzerland
8 points	Malta	Iceland
7 points	Italy	France
6 points	Lithuania	Italy
5 points	Switzerland	Ukraine
4 points	France	Cyprus
3 points	Finland	Netherlands
2 points	Serbia	Bulgaria
1 point	Norway	Russia

==== Detailed voting results ====
The following members comprised the Australian jury:

- Brooke Boney
- Kandiah Kamalesvaran (Kamahl)
- Ash London
- Petra Jane Millgate (Millie Millgate)
- Jack Vidgen

Detailed voting results from Australia (Semi-final 1)
R/O	Country	Jury							Televote	
R/O	Country	Juror A	Juror B	Juror C	Juror D	Juror E	Rank	Points	Rank	Points
01	Lithuania	8	7	7	7	10	9	2	3	8
02	Slovenia	15	10	14	11	14	14		15	
03	Russia	3	6	4	5	7	4	7	4	7
04	Sweden	5	14	1	14	5	5	6	12	
05	Australia									
06	North Macedonia	12	15	13	12	12	15		13	
07	Ireland	4	12	12	4	8	8	3	9	2
08	Cyprus	2	2	3	2	2	2	10	5	6
09	Norway	7	8	8	8	9	10	1	8	3
10	Croatia	14	13	15	6	15	13		6	5
11	Belgium	10	9	11	13	13	12		11	
12	Israel	13	5	5	1	6	3	8	7	4
13	Romania	6	11	6	10	11	11		14	
14	Azerbaijan	11	3	10	9	4	6	5	10	1
15	Ukraine	9	4	9	15	3	7	4	1	12
16	Malta	1	1	2	3	1	1	12	2	10

Detailed voting results from Australia (Final)
R/O	Country	Jury							Televote	
R/O	Country	Juror A	Juror B	Juror C	Juror D	Juror E	Rank	Points	Rank	Points
01	Cyprus	5	5	7	9	13	7	4	14	
02	Albania	25	23	22	24	24	26		24	
03	Israel	12	14	14	25	9	14		15	
04	Belgium	23	22	21	26	25	25		23	
05	Russia	9	10	13	14	16	10	1	12	
06	Malta	1	2	3	4	1	1	12	3	8
07	Portugal	10	15	15	23	10	15		18	
08	Serbia	24	6	20	12	23	12		9	2
09	United Kingdom	8	21	24	22	18	20		21	
10	Greece	13	9	17	18	11	13		11	
11	Switzerland	4	1	8	2	2	2	10	6	5
12	Iceland	2	7	1	6	3	3	8	1	12
13	Spain	21	8	16	21	19	19		26	
14	Moldova	22	20	25	15	22	24		25	
15	Germany	26	26	26	10	26	22		19	
16	Finland	16	25	23	8	15	18		8	3
17	Bulgaria	6	11	9	7	17	9	2	16	
18	Lithuania	17	12	10	20	8	11		5	6
19	Ukraine	11	4	5	5	6	6	5	2	10
20	France	15	3	2	1	5	4	7	7	4
21	Azerbaijan	20	13	19	17	21	21		17	
22	Norway	18	17	18	16	20	23		10	1
23	Netherlands	3	16	6	13	7	8	3	22	
24	Italy	7	24	4	3	4	5	6	4	7
25	Sweden	14	18	11	19	12	16		20	
26	San Marino	19	19	12	11	14	17		13	
