= Eurovision Song Contest 2021 =

International song competition

- Open Up

Dates and venue
- Semi-final 1: 18 May 2021
- Semi-final 2: 20 May 2021
- Final: 22 May 2021
- Venue: Rotterdam Ahoy; Rotterdam, Netherlands

Organisation
- Organiser: European Broadcasting Union (EBU)
- Executive supervisor: Martin Österdahl

Production
- Host broadcaster: AVROTROS; Nederlandse Omroep Stichting (NOS); Nederlandse Publieke Omroep (NPO)
- Directors: Marnix Kaart; Marc Pos; Daniel Jelinek
- Executive producers: Sietse Bakker; Astrid Dutrénit
- Presenters: Chantal Janzen; Edsilia Rombley; Jan Smit; Nikkie de Jager

Participants
- Number of entries: 39
- Number of finalists: 26
- Returning countries: Bulgaria; Ukraine
- Non-returning countries: Armenia; Hungary; Montenegro; Belarus (Suspended)
- Participation map: Finalist countries Countries eliminated in the semi-finals Countries that participated in the past but not in 2021

Vote
- Voting system: Each country awards two sets of 12, 10, 8–1 points to ten songs.
- Winning song: Italy "Zitti e buoni"

The Eurovision Song Contest 2021 was the 65th edition of the Eurovision Song Contest. It consisted of two semi-finals on 18 and 20 May and a final on 22 May 2021, held at Rotterdam Ahoy in Rotterdam, Netherlands, and presented by Chantal Janzen, Edsilia Rombley, Jan Smit, and Nikkie de Jager. It was organised by the European Broadcasting Union (EBU) and host broadcasters Nederlandse Publieke Omroep (NPO), Nederlandse Omroep Stichting (NOS), and AVROTROS, all of which staged the event after AVROTROS had won the 2019 contest for the Netherlands with the song "Arcade" by Duncan Laurence, and following the cancellation of the 2020 contest due to the COVID-19 pandemic.

Broadcasters from thirty-nine countries participated in the contest, of which twenty-six re-entered the artists chosen for 2020, albeit with different songs per the contest's rules. Compared to the 2019 edition, Bulgaria and Ukraine returned while Hungary and Montenegro did not. Armenia and Belarus had originally planned to participate, but the Public Television Company of Armenia (AMPTV) withdrew due to the social and political crises following the Second Nagorno-Karabakh War, and the Belarusian Television and Radio Company (BTRC) was disqualified after submitting entries in violation of the rules twice, and not providing an eligible entry before the deadline.

The winner was Italy with the song "Zitti e buoni", performed by Måneskin and written by the band's members Damiano David, Ethan Torchio, Thomas Raggi, and Victoria De Angelis. France, Switzerland, Iceland, and Ukraine rounded out the top five, with France and Switzerland achieving their best results since 1991 and 1993, respectively. Italy won the combined vote and televote, but placed fourth in the jury vote after Switzerland, France, and Malta. Italy was the second member of the "Big Five" since its introduction to win the contest after Germany in 2010. For the first time since 1995, none of the top three entries were performed in English, with France and Switzerland performing in French, and Italy in Italian.

Additionally, for the first time since the current voting system was implemented in 2016, more than one country received no points from the televote in the final; these countries were Germany, Spain, the host country the Netherlands, and the United Kingdom, the last of those becoming the first country to receive no points from both the jury and televote. It was the second time that the United Kingdom had received no points in the contest, the last time having been in 2003. For the first time since its debut in 2015, Australia failed to qualify for the final, making Ukraine the only country that has never failed to qualify from the semi-finals since their introduction in 2004. (Note: No country has always participated in the final since the introduction of semi-finals in 2004. Ukraine, despite having always reached the final, did not participate in the 2015 and 2019 contests. Additionally, the 2020 contest was cancelled due to the COVID-19 pandemic.)

The EBU reported that the contest had an audience of 183 million viewers in 36 European markets, an increase of a million viewers from the previous edition, with an increase of seven percent in the 15–24 year old age range.

== Location ==
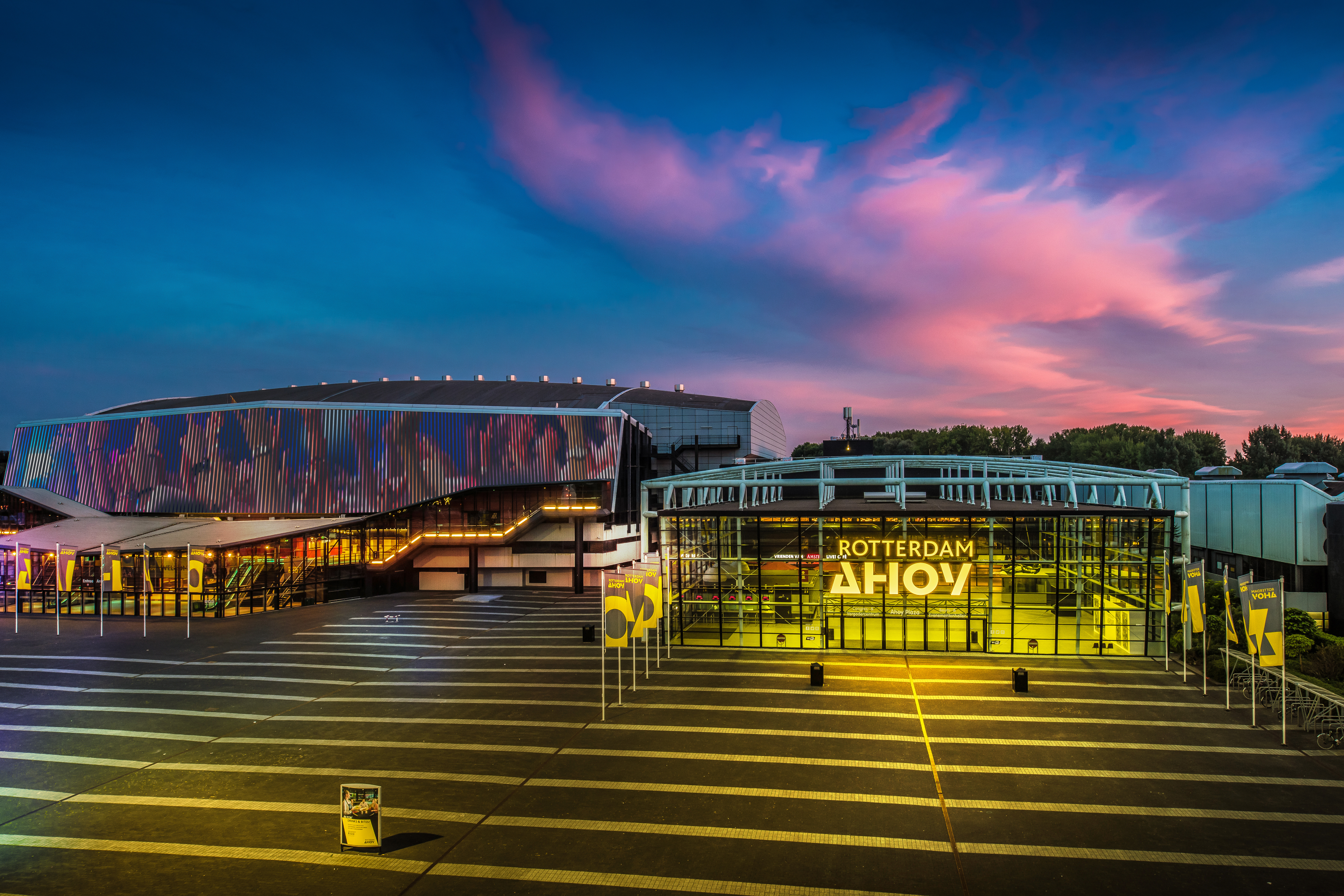
Rotterdam Ahoy – host venue of the 2021 contest

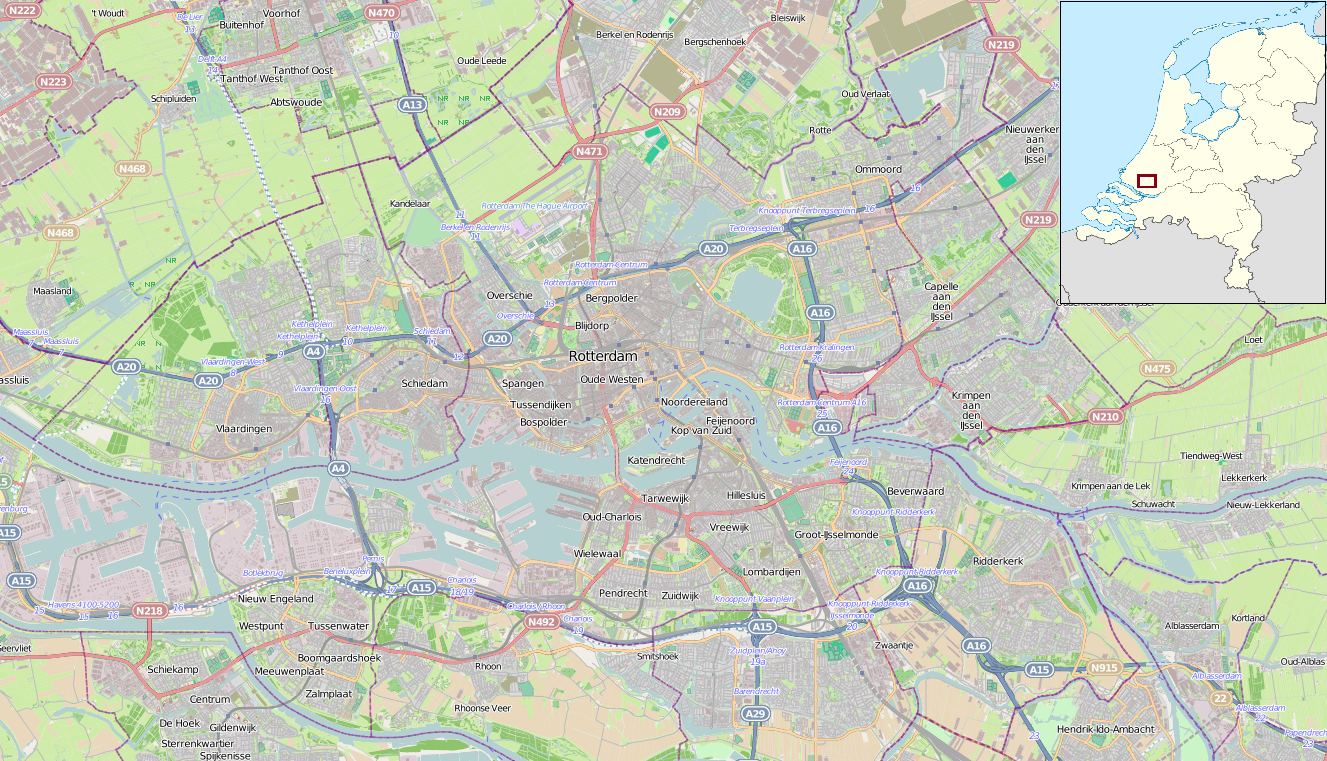
Location of host venue (red) and other contest-related sites and events (blue)

The 2021 contest was held in Rotterdam, Netherlands, following the country's victory at the 2019 edition with the song "Arcade", performed by Duncan Laurence. It was the fifth time that the Netherlands had hosted the contest, having previously done so in 1958, 1970, 1976 and 1980. The selected venue was the 16,400-seat Ahoy Arena in Rotterdam Ahoy, a convention centre and multi-purpose indoor arena located on Ahoyweg, which serves as a venue for many events, including concerts, exhibitions, trade fairs, and conferences. Rotterdam Ahoy had previously hosted the Junior Eurovision Song Contest 2007, and was set to host the 2020 contest before its cancellation. The "Turquoise Carpet" event, where the contestants and their delegations (Note: The Icelandic, Maltese, Polish, and Romanian delegations were absent from the event due to suspected spread of COVID-19 among them.) are presented before the accredited press and fans, took place at the Rotterdam Cruise Terminal on 16 May 2021.

=== Host city selection ===
By Eurovision tradition, the Netherlands received the right to host the Eurovision Song Contest after the country won the competition in 2019. The Dutch host broadcasters NPO, NOS and AVROTROS launched the bidding process in the same month on 29 May, in which five cities – Arnhem, 's-Hertogenbosch, Maastricht, Rotterdam, and Utrecht – submitted their bid books during a ceremonial event held in Hilversum on 10 July 2019. On 16 July, Maastricht and Rotterdam were shortlisted, and after NPO visited both cities, on 30 August 2019, Rotterdam was announced as the host city of the Eurovision Song Contest 2020.

Following the cancellation of the 2020 contest, the EBU began talks with NPO, NOS, AVROTROS, and the government of Rotterdam on the possibility of staging the 2021 contest in the city. On 23 April 2020, the municipal council of Rotterdam approved an increased budget after Dutch media reported that the city would require an additional €6.7 million to host the contest. The decision was imminent as it was required that the EBU be informed by late April if Rotterdam was willing to host the contest. If Rotterdam declined to host the event, NPO, NOS and AVROTROS had until mid-May 2020 to find an alternative. During the broadcast of Eurovision: Europe Shine a Light, which aired on 16 May 2020, Rotterdam was confirmed as the host city of the 2021 contest.

== Participants ==
Eurovision Song Contest 2021 – Participation summaries by country
- Albania; ~~Armenia~~; Australia; Austria; Azerbaijan; ~~Belarus~~; Belgium; Bulgaria; Croatia; Cyprus; Czech Republic; Denmark; Estonia; Finland; France; Georgia; Germany; Greece; Iceland; Ireland; Israel; Italy; Latvia; Lithuania; Malta; Moldova; Netherlands; North Macedonia; Norway; Poland; Portugal; Romania; Russia; San Marino; Serbia; Slovenia; Spain; Sweden; Switzerland; Ukraine; United Kingdom

Eligibility for potential participation in the Eurovision Song Contest requires a national broadcaster with active EBU membership capable of receiving the contest via the Eurovision network and broadcasting it live nationwide. The EBU issued an invitation to participate in the contest to all active members. Associate member Australia did not need an invitation for the 2021 contest, as it had previously been granted permission to participate at least until 2023.

The EBU initially announced on 26 October 2020 that 41 countries would participate in the contest, featuring the same line-up of countries that were set to participate in the cancelled 2020 edition. Bulgaria and Ukraine returned after their absence from the 2019 contest, while Hungary and Montenegro were confirmed as non-returning following their latest appearances in 2019.

In March 2021, Armenia and Belarus confirmed their non-participation in the contest; the Public Television Company of Armenia (AMPTV) withdrew due to the social and political crises in the aftermath of the Second Nagorno-Karabakh War, while the Belarusian Television and Radio Company (BTRC) was disqualified from the contest for failing to provide an eligible entry before the deadline. The number of participants was therefore reduced to 39.

After the cancellation of the 2020 contest, the participating broadcasters of 24 countries announced that, for the 2021 contest, they would internally select the same artists initially selected for 2020. Those artists were: Efendi for Azerbaijan, Montaigne for Australia, Vincent Bueno for Austria, Hooverphonic for Belgium (albeit with a different lead singer), Victoria for Bulgaria, Benny Cristo for the Czech Republic, Tornike Kipiani for Georgia, Stefania for Greece, Eden Alene for Israel, Lesley Roy for Ireland, Daði og Gagnamagnið for Iceland, Samanta Tīna for Latvia, Destiny for Malta, Natalia Gordienko for Moldova, Roxen for Romania, Jeangu Macrooy for the Netherlands, Vasil for North Macedonia, Senhit for San Marino, Hurricane for Serbia, Ana Soklič for Slovenia, Blas Cantó for Spain, Gjon's Tears for Switzerland, Go_A for Ukraine, and James Newman for the United Kingdom. In addition, the artists initially selected for Estonia and Lithuania in 2020, Uku Suviste and The Roop respectively, won their countries' national finals again to represent their countries in 2021.

Discounting 2020, the contest featured three representatives who also previously performed as lead vocalists for the same country, and five artists who participated in other Eurovision events or as backing vocalists for the same or for another country. Among the representatives who returned as lead vocalists, Natalia Gordienko had previously represented Moldova in 2006 with Arsenium and Connect-R; Senhit had represented San Marino in 2011; and Sanja Vučić, a member of Hurricane, had previously represented Serbia in 2016 in a solo performance.

Former backing vocalists who competed as lead artists included Ksenija Knežević, a member of Hurricane, who had previously served as a backing vocalist for Montenegro in 2015; Destiny, who had provided backing vocals for Malta in 2019; Vincent Bueno, who had backed Austria in 2017; and Vasil, who had provided backing vocals for North Macedonia in 2019. Two artists had previously competed in the Junior Eurovision Song Contest, Malta's Destiny, who had won for Malta in 2015, and Greece's Stefania, who had represented the Netherlands in 2016 as a member of the group Kisses. Mladen Lukić, who had previously competed for Serbia in 2018 as a member of Balkanika, returned as a backing vocalist for Hurricane.

Eurovision Song Contest 2021 participants
Country	Broadcaster	Artist	Song	Language	Songwriter(s)
Albania	RTSH	Anxhela Peristeri	"Karma"	Albanian	Kledi Bahiti; Olti Curri
Australia	SBS	Montaigne	"Technicolour"	English	Jess Cerro; Dave Hammer
Austria	ORF	Vincent Bueno	"Amen"	English	Tobias Carshey; Ashley Hicklin; Jonas Thander
Azerbaijan	İTV	Efendi	"Mata Hari"	English	Luuk van Beers; Tony Cornelissen; Josh Earl; Amy van der Wel
Belgium	VRT	Hooverphonic	"The Wrong Place"	English	Alex Callier; Charlotte Forêt
Bulgaria	BNT	Victoria	"Growing Up Is Getting Old"	English	Oliver Björkvall; Victoria Georgieva; Helena Larsson; Maya Nalani
Croatia	HRT	Albina	"Tick-Tock"	English, Croatian	Tihana Buklijaš Bakić; Max Cinnamon; Branimir Mihaljević
Cyprus	CyBC	Elena Tsagrinou	"El Diablo"	English	Laurell Barker; Cleiton "Oxa" Sia; Thomas Stengaard; Jimmy "Joker" Thörnfeldt
Czech Republic	ČT	Benny Cristo	"Omaga"	English	Ben da Silva Cristóvão; Filip Vlček
Denmark	DR	Fyr og Flamme	"Øve os på hinanden"	Danish	Laurits Emanuel
Estonia	ERR	Uku Suviste	"The Lucky One"	English	Uku Suviste; Sharon Vaughn
Finland	Yle	Blind Channel	"Dark Side"	English	Joel Hokka; Aleksi Kaunisvesi; Olli Matela; Niko Moilanen; Joonas Porko
France	France Télévisions	Barbara Pravi	"Voilà"	French	Antoine "Igit" Barrau; Lili Poe; Barbara Pravi
Georgia	GPB	Tornike Kipiani	"You"	English	Tornike Kipiani
Germany	NDR (Note: On behalf of the German public broadcasting consortium ARD)	Jendrik	"I Don't Feel Hate"	English	Christoph Oswald; Jendrik Sigwart
Greece	ERT	Stefania	"Last Dance"	English	Arcade; Dimitris Kontopoulos; Sharon Vaughn
Iceland	RÚV	Daði og Gagnamagnið	"10 Years"	English	Daði Freyr Pétursson
Ireland	RTÉ	Lesley Roy	"Maps"	English	Emelie Eriksson; Lukas Hällgren; Lesley Roy; Philip Strand
Israel	IPBC	Eden Alene	"Set Me Free"	English	Ron Carmi; Amit Mordechai; Ido Netzer; Noam Zlatin
Italy	RAI	Måneskin	"Zitti e buoni"	Italian	Victoria De Angelis; Damiano David; Thomas Raggi; Ethan Torchio
Latvia	LTV	Samanta Tīna	"The Moon Is Rising"	English	Aminata Savadogo; Samanta Tīna; Oskars Uhaņs
Lithuania	LRT	The Roop	"Discoteque"	English	Mantas Banišauskas; Robertas Baranauskas; Laisvūnas Černovas; Kalle Lindroth; Vaidotas Valiukevičius; Ilkka Wirtanen
Malta	PBS	Destiny	"Je me casse"	English	Pete Barringer; Malin Christin; Amanuel Dermont; Nicklas Eklund
Moldova	TRM	Natalia Gordienko	"Sugar"	English	Mikhail Gutseriev; Philipp Kirkorov; Dimitris Kontopoulos; Sharon Vaughn
Netherlands	AVROTROS	Jeangu Macrooy	"Birth of a New Age"	English, Sranan Tongo	Jeangu Macrooy; Pieter Perquin
North Macedonia	MRT	Vasil	"Here I Stand"	English	Vasil Garvanliev; Davor Jordanovski; Borče Kuzmanovski
Norway	NRK	Tix	"Fallen Angel"	English	Andreas Haukeland; Mathias Haukeland; Emelie Hollow
Poland	TVP	Rafał	"The Ride"	English	Thomas Karlsson; Johan Mauritzson; Joakim Övrenius; Clara Rubensson
Portugal	RTP	The Black Mamba	"Love Is on My Side"	English	Pedro "Tatanka" Caldeira
Romania	TVR	Roxen	"Amnesia"	English	Adelina Stîngă; Victor Bouroșu
Russia	C1R	Manizha	"Russian Woman"	Russian, English	Ori Avni; Ori Kaplan; Manizha Sanghin
San Marino	SMRTV	Senhit (Note: Performance contains uncredited live vocals from Flo Rida.)	"Adrenalina"	English	Joy Deb; Linnea Deb; Tramar Dillard; Suzi Pancenkov; Malou Linn Eloise Ruotsalainen; Kenny Silverdique; Thomas Stengaard; Jimmy "Joker" Thörnfeldt; Chanel Tukia; Senhit Zadik Zadik
Serbia	RTS	Hurricane	"Loco loco"	Serbian	Nemanja Antonić; Darko Dimitrov; Sanja Vučić
Slovenia	RTVSLO	Ana Soklič	"Amen"	English	Charlie Mason; Žiga Pirnat; Bojan Simončič; Ana Soklič
Spain	RTVE	Blas Cantó	"Voy a quedarme"	Spanish	Blas Cantó; Dan Hammond; Dangelo Ortega; Leroy Sánchez
Sweden	SVT	Tusse	"Voices"	English	Joy Deb; Linnea Deb; Jimmy "Joker" Thörnfeldt; Anderz Wrethov
Switzerland	SRG SSR	Gjon's Tears	"Tout l'univers"	French	Wouter Hardy; Xavier Michel; Gjon Muharremaj; Nina Sampermans
Ukraine	UA:PBC	Go_A	"Shum" (Шум)	Ukrainian	Kateryna Pavlenko; Taras Shevchenko
United Kingdom	BBC	James Newman	"Embers"	English	Conor Blake; Samuel Brennan; Tom Hollings; James Newman; Danny Shah

=== Other countries ===
==== Active EBU members ====
- Armenia – Having intended to compete in 2020, Armenia was initially confirmed for the 2021 contest when the list of participants was announced by the EBU in October 2020, and was set to perform in the second half of the second semi-final. However, on 5 March 2021, the Public Television Company of Armenia (AMPTV) confirmed that it was subsequently unable to participate due to social and political crises in the country in the aftermath of the Second Nagorno-Karabakh War.
- Belarus – Having intended to compete in 2020, Belarus was initially confirmed for the 2021 contest when the list of participants was announced by the EBU in October 2020, and was set to perform in the first half of the first semi-final. However, after its intended entry "Ya nauchu tebya (I'll Teach You)" by Galasy ZMesta was rejected due to violating the rules, and no eligible replacement entry was submitted before the deadline, the EBU announced on 26 March 2021 that the Belarusian Television and Radio Company (BTRC) had been disqualified. Six days after the Eurovision final, the EBU voted to suspend BTRC's membership due to concerns about the content that it was broadcasting. BTRC was given two weeks to respond before the suspension comes into effect on 11 June, but there was no public response. The broadcaster was expelled from the EBU on 1 July, rendering future participations impossible for an indefinite amount of time.

In November 2019, Democrats for Andorra, the ruling party of former participant Andorra, stated that they would assess the costs in order to grant the country's return to the contest; in 2020, Susanne Georgi, who represented Andorra in 2009, claimed to have secured the funding and held a meeting with Prime Minister of Andorra Xavier Espot Zamora, ultimately agreeing to push the Andorran return to 2022 in consideration of the COVID-19 pandemic. Former participants Morocco and Turkey, despite rumours of a possible return in 2021, did not appear on the final list of participants. Active EBU member broadcasters in Bosnia and Herzegovina, Luxembourg, Monaco and Slovakia confirmed non-participation prior to the announcement of the participants list by the EBU.

==== Associate EBU members ====
In August 2020, the EBU stated that it did not intend to invite Kazakhstan for this year.

==== Non-EBU members ====
In August 2020, the EBU stated that it did not intend to invite Kosovo to participate in the 2021 edition of the contest. Liechtensteiner broadcaster 1FLTV, despite previous attempts to become an EBU member, halted its plans after director Peter Kölbel's unexpected death, and did not resume them due to the lack of sufficient funds and of government support; thus it ruled out debuting in 2021.

== Production ==
The Eurovision Song Contest 2021 was a co-production between three related Dutch television organisations — Nederlandse Publieke Omroep (NPO), Nederlandse Omroep Stichting (NOS) and AVROTROS — of which each assumed a different role. Sietse Bakker and Astrid Dutrénit served as executive producers, while Emilie Sickinghe and Jessica Stam served as deputy executive producers. Marnix Kaart, Marc Pos and Daniel Jelinek served as directors of the three live shows, and Gerben Bakker served as head of show. Background music for the shows was composed by Eric van Tijn.

In January 2020, the EBU announced that Martin Österdahl would become the executive supervisor of the contest after the 2020 edition, succeeding Jon Ola Sand. Before his appointment, Österdahl had been an executive producer for the 2013 and 2016 editions, and had been a member of the contest's reference group between 2012 and 2018.

The total budget for the shows was €22 million, of which €3.7 million was left unspent after the contest, according to the municipal executive. The additional money was allocated to contingency scenarios that were eventually discarded.

=== Impact of the COVID-19 pandemic ===
On 7 May 2020, the Dutch authorities prohibited all mass gatherings in the country until a COVID-19 vaccine became available. The host broadcasters stated that they were assessing the decision and how it would impact the event.

On 18 September 2020, the EBU released a summary of contingency scenarios for the contest in order for it to take place regardless of the pandemic situation, including:

- The event being held as in previous years (scenario A);
- The event being held with social distancing measures in place (scenario B);
- Providing the option for acts to perform from their home country if they are unable to travel to Rotterdam (scenario C);
- A fully-remote contest hosted from Rotterdam (scenario D), with all acts performing from their home country, and no in-person festivities or audience in Rotterdam. This scenario was trialled during the Junior Eurovision Song Contest 2020.

In February 2021, the EBU and the host broadcasters stated that they had ruled out hosting the contest as normal (scenario A). Scenario C was also modified – all acts would perform remotely like in scenario D. A health and safety protocol was published on 2 March 2021, with the EBU affirming that the contest would be held under scenario B, while reiterating that downscaling options remained on the table should circumstances change. On 30 April 2021, the EBU confirmed that the contest would be held under scenario B.

Overview of the hosting scenarios
Contest aspect	Scenario A (Normal)	Scenario B (1.5-metre) †	Scenario C (Travel restrictive)	Scenario D (Lockdown)
Shows from Ahoy	Yes	Yes	Yes	Yes
Participants in Rotterdam	All	All/most	Some	None
Audience in the arena	100%	0–80%	0–80%	None
Side events in Rotterdam	Yes	Adapted	Reduced	None
Press centre	1,500 on site	500 on site 1,000 virtual	1,500 virtual	1,500 virtual

On 1 April 2021, it was announced that an audience of 3,500 people would be allowed at each of the nine shows, including the three live shows and six rehearsals; the Dutch cabinet later gave its approval on 29 April. All audience members must have had tested negative for COVID-19.

Due to pandemic precautions, the "Turquoise Carpet" event was the only in-person side event to take place in 2021. Impacted side events included: the Opening Ceremony event, which was not held; the Eurovision Village, which took place from 15 to 23 May in an online-only form; and the EuroClub, which was cancelled for this year.

=== Visual design ===
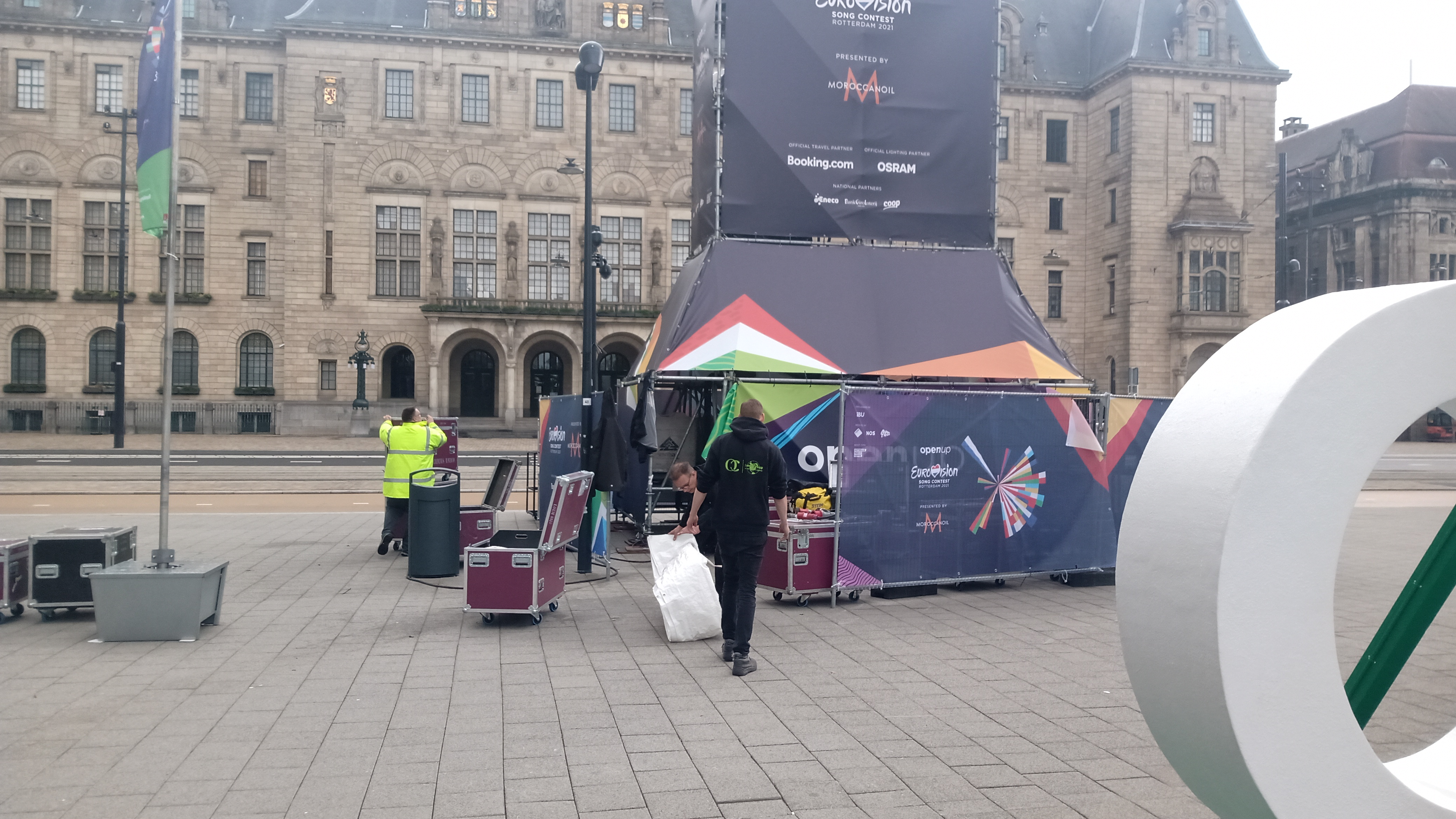
The graphic design of the 2021 contest on display in Rotterdam

On 18 September 2020, along with possible scenarios, the host broadcasters confirmed that the planned visual design and slogan for 2020, "Open Up", would be used in 2021 as well. The revamped logo was unveiled on 4 December 2020. Designed by Clever°Franke, it is "an abstract presentation inspired by the map of the world and visually connects the location of the capitals of the [then] 41 participating countries with Rotterdam as Europe's beating heart". It is accompanied by a new branding system, designed by MediaMonks and NEP, that is built around patterns and 'tracks' that symbolises the Netherlands and the concept of "opening up".

=== Stage design ===
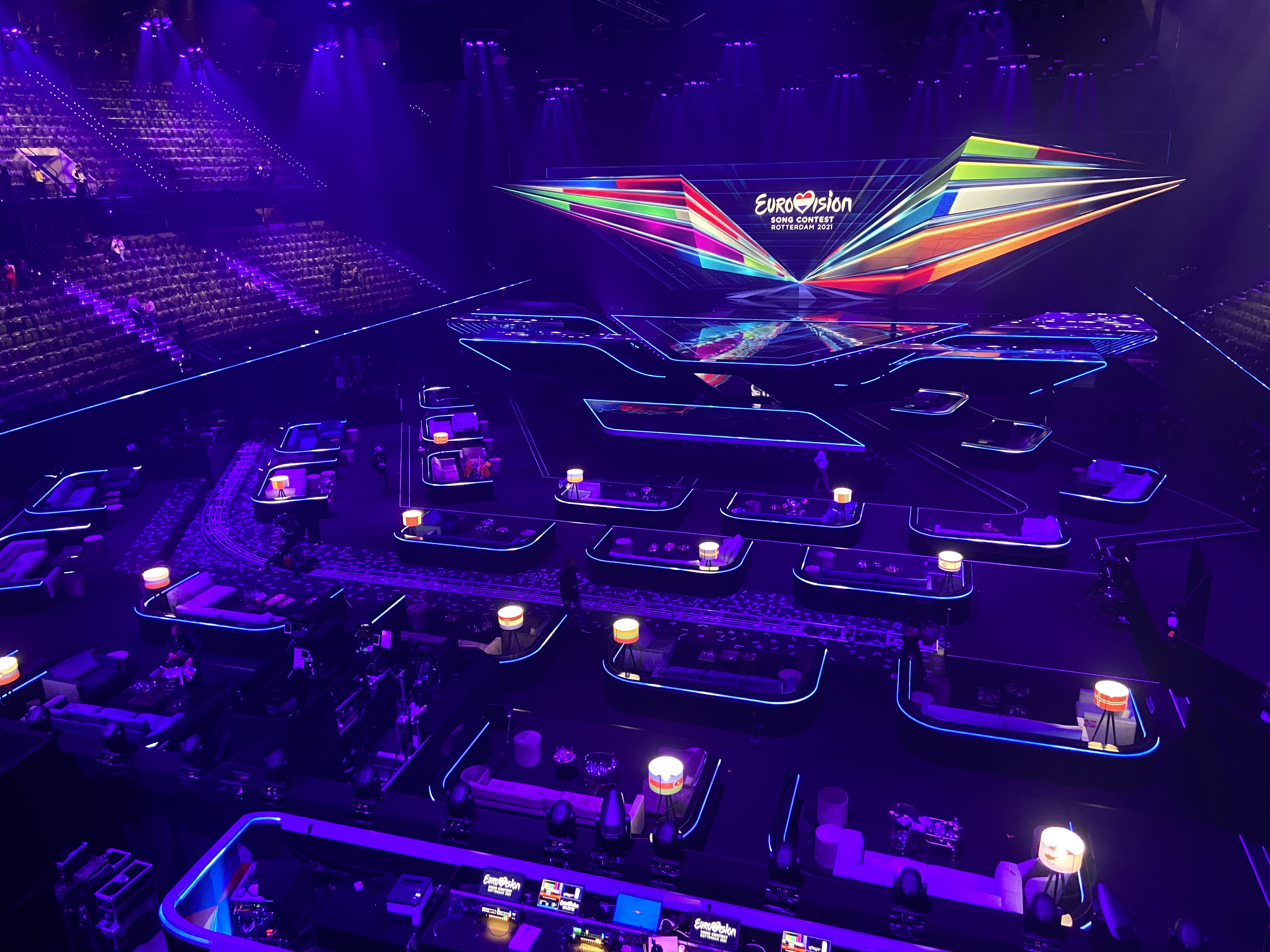
Stage and green room in the arena

During the announcement of the dates of the 2021 contest, executive producer Sietse Bakker stated that the planned stage design for 2020 would also be used in 2021. The stage, inspired by the slogan "Open Up" and the typical Dutch flat landscape, was devised by German stage designer Florian Wieder, who had previously done so for the contests in 2011–12, 2015, and 2017–19. Its features included a revolvable primary LED screen that is 52 metres (171 ft) wide and 12 metres (39 ft) high, and a retractable semi-transparent LED screen which could be used as a backdrop for the secondary stage. The stage was complemented by augmented reality effects. Unlike in 2019, the green room was placed in the main performance venue, and encompassed the entire floor space previously reserved for the standing audience, so as to facilitate social distancing.

=== Postcards ===
The "postcards" were 40-second video introductions shown on television whilst the stage was being prepared for the next contestant to perform their entry. Filmed between January and April, and directed by Martijn Nieman and Laurence Drenthe, with Kevin Soares serving as executive producer, the 2021 postcards were based on the "Open Up" theme of the contest. In a departure from the initial concept created for the 2020 contest owing to travel restriction concerns, the postcards involved the acts being presented through footage shot in their country of origin. These were inserted via chroma keying onto the framework of a 'tiny house' set-up in various locations around the Netherlands, and decorated with items personal to the artist. At the end of each postcard, a light streak hit the house and was refracted into a country-specific coloured streak, mimicking the prism and transitions to the stage, where the ceiling was lit up with that country's flag colours using augmented reality. The postcards were produced by Amsterdam-based production company IDTV, with additional post-production and VFX work by Antwerp-based agency Storm. The following locations were used for each participating country:

- Albania – Hoge Brug, Maastricht
- Australia – Sparta Stadion Het Kasteel, Rotterdam
- Austria – Nannewiid, Frisian Lakes
- Azerbaijan – Giethoorn
- Belgium – Bourtange
- Bulgaria – Agelo
- Croatia – Broek op Langedijk
- Cyprus – 's-Hertogenbosch
- Czech Republic – Almere
- Denmark – Nijmegen
- Estonia – Circuit Zandvoort
- Finland – Sibelco silver sand quarry, Heerlen
- France – Houtribdijk
- Georgia – Port of Rotterdam
- Germany – Scheveningen
- Greece – Halley Astronomical Observatory, Vinkel
- Iceland – Zeeburgereiland, Amsterdam
- Ireland – H'ART Museum
- Israel – Utrecht Centraal railway station
- Italy – Arnhem
- Latvia – Middelburg
- Lithuania – Rotterdam Centraal railway station
- Malta – Vlissingen
- Moldova – Schiermonnikoog
- Netherlands – Ouddorp
- North Macedonia – Dolmen D14, Eext
- Norway – Koppelpoort, Amersfoort
- Poland – Amsterdam Airport Schiphol
- Portugal – Markt, Delft
- Romania – Leeuwarden
- Russia – Bolwoningen, 's-Hertogenbosch
- San Marino – Evoluon, Eindhoven
- Serbia – Keukenhof, Lisse
- Slovenia – Marker Wadden
- Spain – Doornspijk
- Sweden – Museumplein, Amsterdam
- Switzerland – Noordereiland, Rotterdam
- Ukraine – Veluwezoom National Park
- United Kingdom – Gasselte

=== Presenters ===
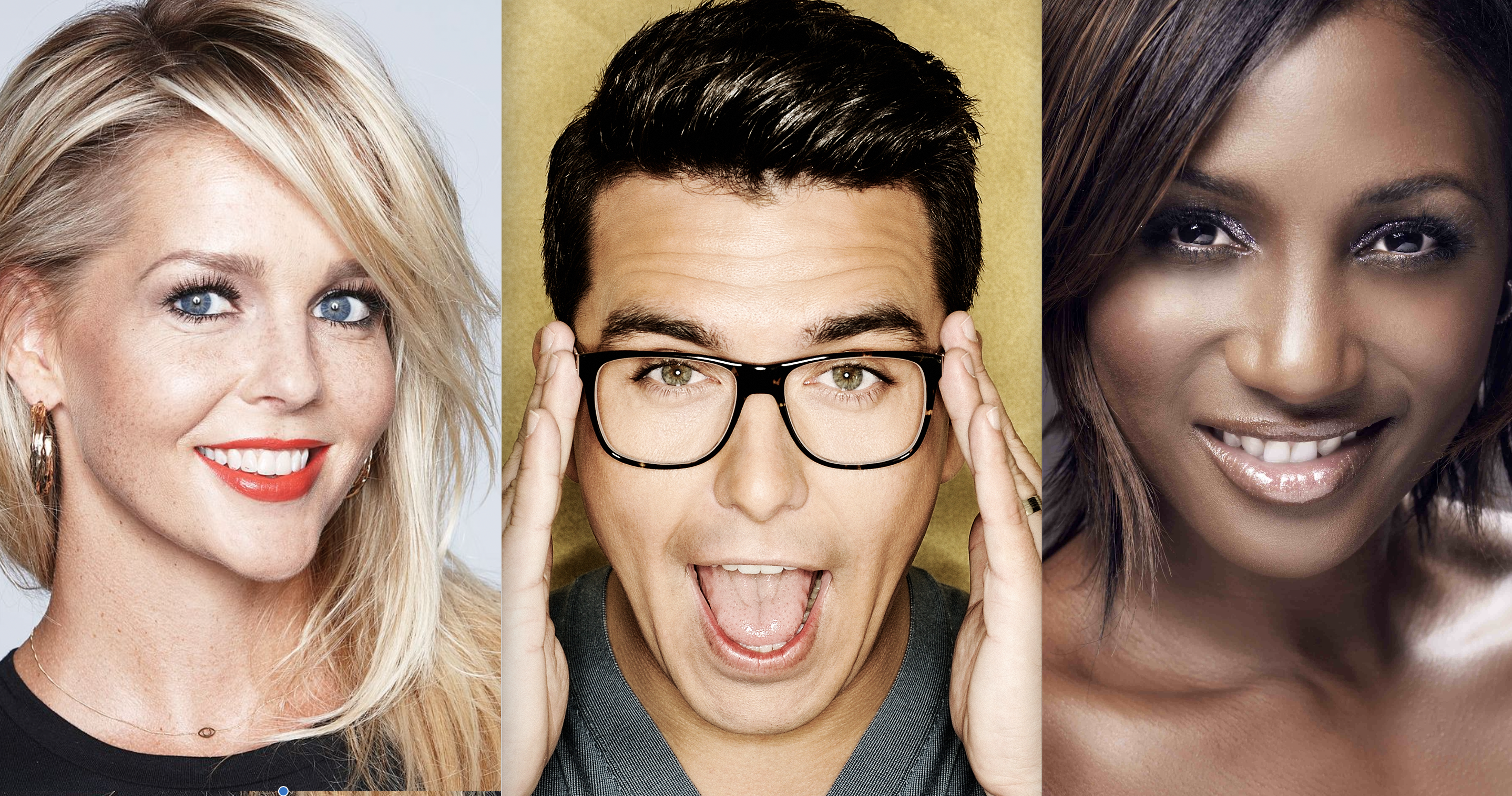
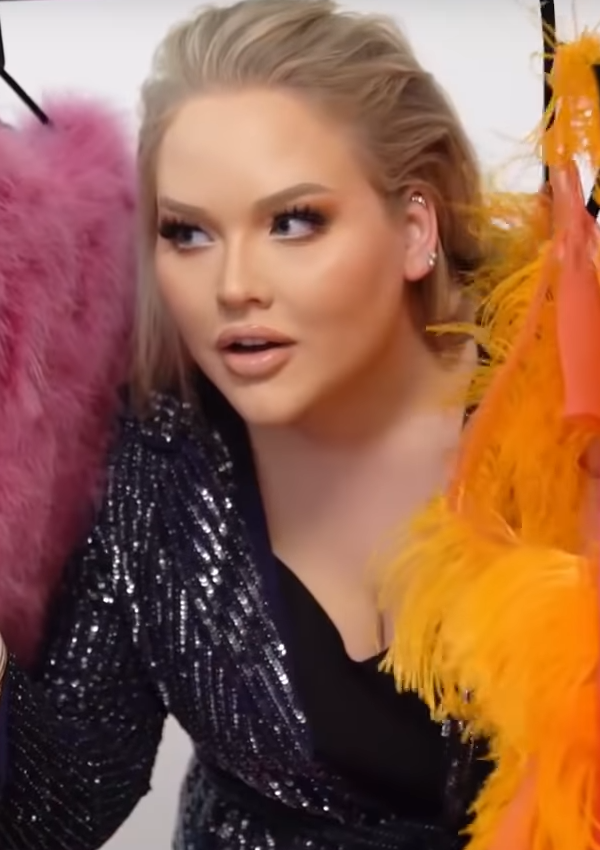
Chantal Janzen, Jan Smit, Edsilia Rombley and Nikkie de Jager, presenters of the 2021 contest

On 18 September 2020, along with possible scenarios, the host broadcasters confirmed that the planned presenters for 2020 would do so in 2021: actress and television host Chantal Janzen, singer and commentator for the contest Jan Smit, singer Edsilia Rombley, who represented the Netherlands in 1998 and 2007, and beauty vlogger Nikkie de Jager (NikkieTutorials). De Jager, who was initially scheduled to be an "online host" in 2020, was promoted to a main presenter alongside Janzen, Smit, and Rombley.

In addition, De Jager and Krista Siegfrids (who represented Finland in 2013) presented the contest's online content. Siegfrids hosted Krista Calling, a weekly YouTube series with behind-the-scenes coverage from Rotterdam, and De Jager hosted LookLab with NikkieTutorials, an online talk show series featuring 38 participants with Queen Máxima as a special guest. (Note: Tornike Kipiani from Georgia opted not to participate in the series.) Koos van Plateringen, Hila Noorzai, and Samya Hafsaoui moderated the contest's press conferences, while Van Plateringen and Fenna Ramos hosted the "Turquoise Carpet" event.

== Format ==
=== Entries ===
For this year, delegations were given the option to use pre-recorded backing vocals. Each delegation could still choose to use backing singers, whether on or off stage, or a combination of live and recorded backing vocals. All lead vocals performing the melody of the song must still be live, according to the rules. As a measure to guarantee that all participants could take part in the contest, every national broadcaster were required to create a 'live-on-tape' backup recording prior to the contest, which could be used if a participant was unable to travel to Rotterdam, or subjected to quarantine on arrival. The recordings took place in a studio setting, in real-time (as it would be at the contest) without any edits to the vocals or any part of the performance itself after the recording. A set of production guidelines was also revealed to ensure fairness and the integrity of the recordings. All live-on-tape recordings, excluding those of Ireland and the United Kingdom, were later released on 28 and 29 May 2021, as part of the Eurovision Song Celebration: Live-on-Tape shows on the contest's official YouTube channel.

Other rules for the entries stayed the same in the 2021 contest. This includes that the maximum length for a song is three minutes, that there can be at most six performers on stage, and that the compositions (lyrics and music) must not have been commercially released before 1 September of the year before. Following the cancellation of the 2020 contest, the EBU explored the option of allowing the songs selected for the 2020 contest to compete in the 2021 contest, which needed to be discussed with the Eurovision Song Contest reference group and the national broadcasters. Victoria, Bulgaria's representative for 2020 and 2021, publicly expressed her support for such a move. However, on 20 March 2020, the reference group decided that, in accordance with the rules of the Eurovision Song Contest, the 2020 songs would not be eligible to compete in the 2021 contest.

=== Semi-final allocation draw ===
Results of the semi-final allocation draw for the 2020 contest, which was retained for 2021 Participating countries in the first semi-final (Note: Belarus, which had originally been allocated into semi-final 1, was disqualified from the contest on 26 March 2021.) Pre-qualified for the final but also voting in the first semi-final Participating countries in the second semi-final (Note: Armenia, which had originally been allocated into semi-final 2, withdrew from the contest on 5 March 2021.) Pre-qualified for the final but also voting in the second semi-final

On 17 November 2020, the EBU confirmed that the semi-final allocation draw for the 2021 contest would not be held. Instead, the semi-finals would feature the same line-up of countries as determined by the draw for the 2020 contest's semi-finals, which was held on 28 January 2020 at the Rotterdam City Hall and hosted by contest presenters Chantal Janzen, Jan Smit and Edsilia Rombley. The draw also determined which semi-final each of the six automatic qualifiers – host country the Netherlands and "Big Five" countries France, Germany, Italy, Spain and the United Kingdom – would broadcast and vote in. The EBU also decided to retain the Netherlands' running order position in the final – 23.

The pots used initially for the 2020 contest featured as follows:

Pot 1	Pot 2	Pot 3	Pot 4	Pot 5
Albania; Austria; Croatia; North Macedonia; Serbia; Slovenia; Switzerland	Australia; Denmark; Estonia; Finland; Iceland; Norway; Sweden	~~Armenia~~; Azerbaijan; ~~Belarus~~; Georgia; Moldova; Russia; Ukraine	Bulgaria; Cyprus; Greece; Malta; Portugal; Romania; San Marino	Belgium; Czech Republic; Ireland; Israel; Latvia; Lithuania; Poland

== Contest overview ==
=== Semi-final 1 ===
The first semi-final took place on 18 May 2021 at 21:00 (CEST). Sixteen countries participated in this semi-final, with the running order published on 30 March 2021. Malta won the most points, followed by Ukraine, Russia, Lithuania, Israel, Cyprus, Sweden, Azerbaijan, Belgium, and Norway. The countries that failed to reach the final were Slovenia, Australia, North Macedonia, Ireland, Croatia, and Romania. All the countries competing in this semi-final were eligible to vote, plus Germany, Italy and the Netherlands. Belarus was originally allocated to participate in the first half of the semi-final, but was disqualified from the contest after submitting entries in violation of the rules twice, and not providing an eligible entry before the deadline.

This semi-final was opened by Duncan Laurence performing "Feel Something", while the interval act was singer and YouTuber Davina Michelle performing her new single "Sweet Water" with narration by actress Thekla Reuten. The interval act, titled "The Power of Water", is centered on the Netherlands' history of water management. In both acts, augmented reality was used. The Dutch, German, and Italian artists were then interviewed, and clips of their competing songs were played.

Qualifiers

Results of the first semi-final of the Eurovision Song Contest 2021
R/O	Country	Artist	Song	Points	Place
1	Lithuania	The Roop	"Discoteque"	203	4
2	Slovenia	Ana Soklič	"Amen"	44	13
3	Russia	Manizha	"Russian Woman"	225	3
4	Sweden	Tusse	"Voices"	142	7
5	Australia (Note: Due to travel restrictions related to the COVID-19 pandemic in the country, Australia competed using their 'live-on-tape' performance, filmed at SBS Studios in Sydney.)	Montaigne	"Technicolour"	28	14
6	North Macedonia	Vasil	"Here I Stand"	23	15
7	Ireland	Lesley Roy	"Maps"	20	16
8	Cyprus	Elena Tsagrinou	"El Diablo"	170	6
9	Norway	Tix	"Fallen Angel"	115	10
10	Croatia	Albina	"Tick-Tock"	110	11
11	Belgium	Hooverphonic	"The Wrong Place"	117	9
12	Israel	Eden Alene	"Set Me Free"	192	5
13	Romania	Roxen	"Amnesia"	85	12
14	Azerbaijan	Efendi	"Mata Hari"	138	8
15	Ukraine	Go_A	"Shum"	267	2
16	Malta	Destiny	"Je me casse"	325	1

=== Semi-final 2 ===
The second semi-final took place on 20 May 2021 at 21:00 (CEST). Seventeen countries participated in this semi-final, with the running order published on 30 March 2021. Switzerland won the most points, followed by Iceland, Bulgaria, Portugal, Finland, Greece, Moldova, Serbia, San Marino, and Albania. The countries that failed to reach the final were Estonia, the Czech Republic, Austria, Poland, Georgia, Latvia, and Denmark. All the countries competing in this semi-final were eligible to vote, plus France, Spain and the United Kingdom. Armenia was originally allocated to participate in the second half of the semi-final, but withdrew from the contest due to its social and political crises in the aftermath of the Second Nagorno-Karabakh War.

This semi-final was opened by breakdancer Redouan "Redo" Ait Chitt and singer-songwriter Eefje de Visser, with ballet dancer Ahmad Joudeh and BMX-er Dez Maarsen performing during the interval; the acts are titled "Forward Unlimited" and "Close Encounter of a Special Kind", respectively. The British, French, and Spanish artists were then interviewed, and clips of their competing songs were played.

Qualifiers

Results of the second semi-final of the Eurovision Song Contest 2021
R/O	Country	Artist	Song	Points	Place
1	San Marino	Senhit	"Adrenalina"	118	9
2	Estonia	Uku Suviste	"The Lucky One"	58	13
3	Czech Republic	Benny Cristo	"Omaga"	23	15
4	Greece	Stefania	"Last Dance"	184	6
5	Austria	Vincent Bueno	"Amen"	66	12
6	Poland	Rafał	"The Ride"	35	14
7	Moldova	Natalia Gordienko	"Sugar"	179	7
8	Iceland (Note: Following a positive COVID-19 test result for a member of Gagnamagnið, Iceland competed using footage from their rehearsal at Rotterdam Ahoy, recorded on 13 May.)	Daði og Gagnamagnið	"10 Years"	288	2
9	Serbia	Hurricane	"Loco loco"	124	8
10	Georgia	Tornike Kipiani	"You"	16	16
11	Albania	Anxhela Peristeri	"Karma"	112	10
12	Portugal	The Black Mamba	"Love Is on My Side"	239	4
13	Bulgaria	Victoria	"Growing Up Is Getting Old"	250	3
14	Finland	Blind Channel	"Dark Side"	234	5
15	Latvia	Samanta Tīna	"The Moon Is Rising"	14	17
16	Switzerland	Gjon's Tears	"Tout l'univers"	291	1
17	Denmark	Fyr og Flamme	"Øve os på hinanden"	89	11

=== Final ===
The final took place on 22 May 2021 at 21:00 (CEST). Twenty-six countries participated in the final, with all thirty-nine participating countries eligible to vote. The running order for the final was published on 21 May 2021. Italy won with 524 points, also winning the televote. France came second with 499 points, with Switzerland (which won the jury vote), Iceland, Ukraine, Finland, Malta, Lithuania, Russia, and Greece completing the top ten. San Marino, the Netherlands, Spain, Germany, and the United Kingdom occupied the bottom five positions, of which the last four countries received no points from the televote.

The final was opened by the traditional flag parade, introducing all twenty-six finalists, accompanied by a remix of "Venus" produced by Pieter Gabriel, with co-presenters Chantal Janzen, Jan Smit and Edsilia Rombley singing parts of the song. The interval acts included a medley of "Hero", "Ten Feet Tall", and "Titanium" performed by DJ Afrojack, singers Wulf and Glennis Grace, and an orchestra composed of young Dutch musicians; the "Rock the Roof" interval act, where six former winners – Måns Zelmerlöw, Teach-In, Sandra Kim, Lenny Kuhr, Helena Paparizou, and Lordi – performed their winning songs – "Heroes" (Sweden 2015), "Ding-a-dong" (Netherlands 1975), "J'aime la vie" (Belgium 1986), "De troubadour" (Netherlands 1969), "My Number One" (Greece 2005), and "Hard Rock Hallelujah" (Finland 2006) respectively – atop several venues in Rotterdam; and Duncan Laurence, who performed his winning song in 2019, "Arcade", and his new single "Stars". (Note: Laurence's interval performance in the final was pre-recorded due to him testing positive for COVID-19 two days prior.) A dance performance titled "The Human Countdown" closed the voting window.

Results of the final of the Eurovision Song Contest 2021
R/O	Country	Artist	Song	Points	Place
1	Cyprus	Elena Tsagrinou	"El Diablo"	94	16
2	Albania	Anxhela Peristeri	"Karma"	57	21
3	Israel	Eden Alene	"Set Me Free"	93	17
4	Belgium	Hooverphonic	"The Wrong Place"	74	19
5	Russia	Manizha	"Russian Woman"	204	9
6	Malta	Destiny	"Je me casse"	255	7
7	Portugal	The Black Mamba	"Love Is on My Side"	153	12
8	Serbia	Hurricane	"Loco loco"	102	15
9	United Kingdom	James Newman	"Embers"	0	26
10	Greece	Stefania	"Last Dance"	170	10
11	Switzerland	Gjon's Tears	"Tout l'univers"	432	3
12	Iceland	Daði og Gagnamagnið	"10 Years"	378	4
13	Spain	Blas Cantó	"Voy a quedarme"	6	24
14	Moldova	Natalia Gordienko	"Sugar"	115	13
15	Germany	Jendrik	"I Don't Feel Hate"	3	25
16	Finland	Blind Channel	"Dark Side"	301	6
17	Bulgaria	Victoria	"Growing Up Is Getting Old"	170	11
18	Lithuania	The Roop	"Discoteque"	220	8
19	Ukraine	Go_A	"Shum"	364	5
20	France	Barbara Pravi	"Voilà"	499	2
21	Azerbaijan	Efendi	"Mata Hari"	65	20
22	Norway	Tix	"Fallen Angel"	75	18
23	Netherlands	Jeangu Macrooy	"Birth of a New Age"	11	23
24	Italy	Måneskin	"Zitti e buoni"	524	1
25	Sweden	Tusse	"Voices"	109	14
26	San Marino	Senhit	"Adrenalina"	50	22

==== Spokespersons ====
The spokespersons announced the 12-point score from their respective country's national jury in the following order:

1. Israel – Lucy Ayoub
2. Poland – Ida Nowakowska
3. San Marino – Monica Fabbri
4. Albania – Andri Xhahu
5. Malta – Stephanie Spiteri
6. Estonia – Sissi
7. North Macedonia – Vane Markoski
8. Azerbaijan – Ell and Nikki
9. Norway – Silje Skjemstad Cruz
10. Spain – Nieves Álvarez
11. Austria – Philipp Hansa
12. United Kingdom – Amanda Holden
13. Italy – Carolina Di Domenico
14. Slovenia – Lorella Flego
15. Greece – Manolis Gkinis
16. Latvia – Aminata Savadogo
17. Ireland – Ryan O'Shaughnessy
18. Moldova – Sergey Stepanov (also known as "Epic Sax Guy")
19. Serbia – Dragana Kosjerina
20. Bulgaria – Joanna Dragneva
21. Cyprus – Loukas Hamatsos
22. Belgium – Danira Boukhriss
23. Germany – Barbara Schöneberger
24. Australia – Joel Creasey
25. Finland – Katri Norrlin
26. Portugal – Elisa
27. Ukraine – Tayanna
28. Iceland – Hannes Óli Ágústsson (as Olaf Yohansson from Eurovision Song Contest: The Story of Fire Saga)
29. Romania – Cătălina Ponor
30. Croatia – Ivan Dorian Molnar
31. Czech Republic – Taťána Kuchařová
32. Georgia – Oto Nemsadze
33. Lithuania – Andrius Mamontovas
34. Denmark – Tina Müller
35. Russia – Polina Gagarina
36. France – Carla
37. Sweden – Carola
38. Switzerland – Angélique Beldner
39. Netherlands – Romy Monteiro (Note: Monteiro was a replacement for Duncan Laurence, who was absent due to testing positive for COVID-19.)

== Detailed voting results ==
=== Semi-final 1 ===
Qualifiers

Split results of semi-final 1
Place	Combined		Jury		Televoting	
Place	Country	Points	Country	Points	Country	Points
1	Malta	325	Malta	174	Ukraine	164
2	Ukraine	267	Russia	117	Malta	151
3	Russia	225	Ukraine	103	Lithuania	137
4	Lithuania	203	Israel	99	Russia	108
5	Israel	192	Cyprus	92	Israel	93
6	Cyprus	170	Sweden	91	Azerbaijan	91
7	Sweden	142	Belgium	70	Cyprus	78
8	Azerbaijan	138	Lithuania	66	Norway	77
9	Belgium	117	Romania	58	Croatia	53
10	Norway	115	Croatia	57	Sweden	51
11	Croatia	110	Azerbaijan	47	Belgium	47
12	Romania	85	Norway	38	Romania	27
13	Slovenia	44	Slovenia	36	North Macedonia	11
14	Australia	28	Australia	26	Slovenia	8
15	North Macedonia	23	Ireland	16	Ireland	4
16	Ireland	20	North Macedonia	12	Australia	2

The ten qualifiers from the first semi-final were determined by televoting and/or SMS-voting (50%) and five-member juries (50%). All sixteen countries competing in the first semi-final voted, alongside Germany, Italy, and the Netherlands. The ten qualifying countries were announced in no particular order, and the full results of how each country voted was published after the final had been held.

Detailed jury voting results of semi-final 1
Voting procedure used: 100% televoting; 100% jury vote		Total score	Jury score	Televoting score	Jury vote																		
Voting procedure used: 100% televoting; 100% jury vote		Total score	Jury score	Televoting score	Lithuania	Slovenia	Russia	Sweden	Australia	North Macedonia	Ireland	Cyprus	Norway	Croatia	Belgium	Israel	Romania	Azerbaijan	Ukraine	Malta	Germany	Italy	Netherlands
Contestants	Lithuania	203	66	137			2	7	2		5	3		6	2	12	8		1	4	4	7	3
Contestants	Slovenia	44	36	8						3		6	4			3	7	4	4	5			
Contestants	Russia	225	117	108		10		6	7	7	8	8	3	8	12	6	5	12		1	7	5	12
Contestants	Sweden	142	91	51	3		7		6	1	1	7	10	1	6	5	4	6	3	10	12	4	5
Contestants	Australia	28	26	2	8		1							2			2		12		1		
Contestants	North Macedonia	23	12	11		4					2						6						
Contestants	Ireland	20	16	4				1	3			2	1		3			3		2		1	
Contestants	Cyprus	170	92	78	4	12	8	4	10	4	4		5	10		10	3		2	8	5	3	
Contestants	Norway	115	38	77	2	3		8	1	2	3				7	2						6	4
Contestants	Croatia	110	57	53	1	7	3			8	10	5			1	1	1	5	8	3	2	2	
Contestants	Belgium	117	70	47	10	5	6	2				4		4		7		2	10			10	10
Contestants	Israel	192	99	93	7	2	10	10	8	12		1	8	7	4			1	6		3	12	8
Contestants	Romania	85	58	27	5							10	2	3	5			7	7	12	6		1
Contestants	Azerbaijan	138	47	91		8	4	3	5	6	7		6							6			2
Contestants	Ukraine	267	103	164	12	1	5	5	4	5	6		7	5	10	4	10	8		7	8		6
Contestants	Malta	325	174	151	6	6	12	12	12	10	12	12	12	12	8	8	12	10	5		10	8	7

Detailed televoting results of semi-final 1
Voting procedure used: 100% televoting; 100% jury vote		Total score	Jury score	Televoting score	Televote																		
Voting procedure used: 100% televoting; 100% jury vote		Total score	Jury score	Televoting score	Lithuania	Slovenia	Russia	Sweden	Australia	North Macedonia	Ireland	Cyprus	Norway	Croatia	Belgium	Israel	Romania	Azerbaijan	Ukraine	Malta	Germany	Italy	Netherlands
Contestants	Lithuania	203	66	137			7	10	8	4	12	12	12	3	8	5	6	3	12	7	12	8	8
Contestants	Slovenia	44	36	8						3				5									
Contestants	Russia	225	117	108	8	7		3	7	8	1	7	4	10	2	12	5	8	6	2	6	7	5
Contestants	Sweden	142	91	51	5	2	2				4	3	10		7	2		1	3	10			2
Contestants	Australia	28	26	2			1												1				
Contestants	North Macedonia	23	12	11		8								1			2						
Contestants	Ireland	20	16	4	1				2											1			
Contestants	Cyprus	170	92	78	4	1	5	4	6	6	6		3	6	3	6	4	4	4	12	1	2	1
Contestants	Norway	115	38	77	6	6	6	12	3		2	1		2	6	4	3	10	2	6	4	1	3
Contestants	Croatia	110	57	53		12		2	5	12	7	2	1			3		2			7		
Contestants	Belgium	117	70	47	10	4	3	5		2			2			1	1		5		3	4	7
Contestants	Israel	192	99	93	2		4	6	4	1	5	10	5	4	4		10	12	7	5	5	3	6
Contestants	Romania	85	58	27							3	5			1			5		3		10	
Contestants	Azerbaijan	138	47	91	3	3	10	1	1	7		4	6	8	5	7	7		10	8	2	5	4
Contestants	Ukraine	267	103	164	12	10	12	7	12	5	8	6	7	12	10	8	12	7		4	10	12	10
Contestants	Malta	325	174	151	7	5	8	8	10	10	10	8	8	7	12	10	8	6	8		8	6	12

==== 12 points ====
Below is a summary of all 12 points received in the first semi-final. In the jury vote, Malta received the maximum score of 12 points from eight countries, while Russia received three sets of 12 points. Israel were awarded two sets of 12 points, while Australia, Cyprus, Lithuania, Romania, Sweden, and Ukraine were each awarded one set of 12 points. In the public vote, Ukraine received six sets of 12 points, while Lithuania received the maximum score of 12 points from five countries. Croatia and Malta each received two sets of 12 points, while Cyprus, Israel, Norway, and Russia were each awarded one set of 12 points.

12 points awarded by juries
N.	Contestant	Nation(s) giving 12 points
8	Malta	Australia, Croatia, Cyprus, Ireland, Norway, Romania, Russia, Sweden
3	Russia	Azerbaijan, Belgium, Netherlands
2	Israel	Italy, North Macedonia
1	Australia	Ukraine
1	Cyprus	Slovenia
1	Lithuania	Israel
1	Romania	Malta
1	Sweden	Germany
1	Ukraine	Lithuania

12 points awarded by televoting
N.	Contestant	Nation(s) giving 12 points
6	Ukraine	Australia, Croatia, Italy, Lithuania, Romania, Russia
5	Lithuania	Cyprus, Germany, Ireland, Norway, Ukraine
2	Croatia	North Macedonia, Slovenia
2	Malta	Belgium, Netherlands
1	Cyprus	Malta
1	Israel	Azerbaijan
1	Norway	Sweden
1	Russia	Israel

=== Semi-final 2 ===
Qualifiers

Split results of semi-final 2
Place	Combined		Jury		Televoting	
Place	Country	Points	Country	Points	Country	Points
1	Switzerland	291	Switzerland	156	Finland	150
2	Iceland	288	Bulgaria	149	Iceland	148
3	Bulgaria	250	Iceland	140	Switzerland	135
4	Portugal	239	Portugal	128	Moldova	123
5	Finland	234	Greece	104	Portugal	111
6	Greece	184	Finland	84	Bulgaria	101
7	Moldova	179	San Marino	76	Denmark	80
8	Serbia	124	Albania	74	Greece	80
9	San Marino	118	Serbia	56	Serbia	68
10	Albania	112	Moldova	56	San Marino	42
11	Denmark	89	Austria	53	Albania	38
12	Austria	66	Estonia	29	Estonia	29
13	Estonia	58	Czech Republic	23	Poland	17
14	Poland	35	Poland	18	Georgia	15
15	Czech Republic	23	Denmark	9	Austria	13
16	Georgia	16	Latvia	4	Latvia	10
17	Latvia	14	Georgia	1	Czech Republic	0

The ten qualifiers from the second semi-final were determined by televoting and/or SMS-voting (50%) and five-member juries (50%). All seventeen countries competing in the second semi-final voted, alongside France, Spain, and the United Kingdom. The ten qualifying countries were announced in no particular order, and the full results of how each country voted was published after the final had been held.

Detailed jury voting results of semi-final 2
Voting procedure used: 100% televoting; 100% jury vote		Total score	Jury score	Televoting score	Jury vote																			
Voting procedure used: 100% televoting; 100% jury vote		Total score	Jury score	Televoting score	San Marino	Estonia	Czech Republic	Greece	Austria	Poland	Moldova	Iceland	Serbia	Georgia	Albania	Portugal	Bulgaria	Finland	Latvia	Switzerland	Denmark	France	Spain	United Kingdom
Contestants	San Marino	118	76	42		1	2	10	1	10	10	3	2	1	8		2	2	2	2	5	8	3	4
Contestants	Estonia	58	29	29				1		4	3		1	3		1	7		3	3			1	2
Contestants	Czech Republic	23	23	0				4			1			6		5	5					2		
Contestants	Greece	184	104	80	10	3	5			12	8	7	8		10	3	10	6		1	2	12	7	
Contestants	Austria	66	53	13		4						4	3	5	7	2	6	5	1	7	3		6	
Contestants	Poland	35	18	17	12			2									3				1			
Contestants	Moldova	179	56	123	8			12	2	7			4		3		12		4			1		3
Contestants	Iceland	288	140	148	1	8	10	7	10	3	6		12	7	4	10		8	12	8	8	6	8	12
Contestants	Serbia	124	56	68	4	5	4	3	6			2		2	5	4		3		4		5	4	5
Contestants	Georgia	16	1	15													1							
Contestants	Albania	112	74	38	7	2	1	6	3	6	5	5				8	4	4	5	5	10		2	1
Contestants	Portugal	239	128	111	2	6	12	5	7	1	2	8	7	10	1		8	7	8	10	4	10	10	10
Contestants	Bulgaria	250	149	101	5	10	7	8	8	5	12	10	10	8	2	12		12	6	12	6	4	5	7
Contestants	Finland	234	84	150	3	7	6		5	2		6	6	4	6	6			7	6	7	7		6
Contestants	Latvia	14	4	10							4													
Contestants	Switzerland	291	156	135	6	12	8		12	8	7	12	5	12	12	7		10	10		12	3	12	8
Contestants	Denmark	89	9	80			3		4			1						1						

Detailed televoting results of semi-final 2
Voting procedure used: 100% televoting; 100% jury vote		Total score	Jury score	Televoting score	Televote																			
Voting procedure used: 100% televoting; 100% jury vote		Total score	Jury score	Televoting score	San Marino	Estonia	Czech Republic	Greece	Austria	Poland	Moldova	Iceland	Serbia	Georgia	Albania	Portugal	Bulgaria	Finland	Latvia	Switzerland	Denmark	France	Spain	United Kingdom
Contestants	San Marino	118	76	42		4		2		2		3	3	12	7			1			2		4	2
Contestants	Estonia	58	29	29			1				3						1	7	10	1	6			
Contestants	Czech Republic	23	23	0																				
Contestants	Greece	184	104	80	5		2				12	5	8	10	10	10	8	2	1	2	3		1	1
Contestants	Austria	66	53	13								2			3					4	4			
Contestants	Poland	35	18	17					1		7	1										1		7
Contestants	Moldova	179	56	123	12	12	12	12	6	7		6	12			12		5	12			12	3	
Contestants	Iceland	288	140	148	8	7	10	5	10	10	6		7	7	1	7	6	12	7	7	12	6	8	12
Contestants	Serbia	124	56	68	7		5	4	12	1	1			1	4	2	10			12		7	2	
Contestants	Georgia	16	1	15		3				3						3	2		3		1			
Contestants	Albania	112	74	38	2			10	2		2		1	2		1	4	3		8		3		
Contestants	Portugal	239	128	111	3	5	4	3	7	5	4	8	4		6		5	6	5	10	8	10	12	6
Contestants	Bulgaria	250	149	101	4	2	6	6	4	4	5	4	6	8	8	5		4	2	3	5	5	10	10
Contestants	Finland	234	84	150	10	10	8	8	5	12	8	10	10	6	5	6	12		8	6	10	2	6	8
Contestants	Latvia	14	4	10		1								5										4
Contestants	Switzerland	291	156	135	6	6	7	7	8	8	10	7	5	3	12	8	7	10	6		7	8	7	3
Contestants	Denmark	89	9	80	1	8	3	1	3	6		12	2	4	2	4	3	8	4	5		4	5	5

==== 12 points ====
Below is a summary of all 12 points received in the second semi-final. In the jury vote, Switzerland received the maximum score of 12 points from seven countries, while Bulgaria received four sets of 12 points. Iceland were awarded three sets of 12 points, Greece and Moldova each received two sets of 12 points, while Poland and Portugal were each awarded one set of 12 points. In the public vote, Moldova received eight sets of 12 points, while Iceland received the maximum score of 12 points from three countries. Finland and Serbia each received two sets of 12 points, while Denmark, Greece, Portugal, San Marino, and Switzerland were each awarded one set of 12 points.

12 points awarded by juries
N.	Contestant	Nation(s) giving 12 points
7	Switzerland	Albania, Austria, Denmark, Estonia, Georgia, Iceland, Spain
4	Bulgaria	Finland, Moldova, Portugal, Switzerland
3	Iceland	Latvia, Serbia, United Kingdom
2	Greece	France, Poland
2	Moldova	Bulgaria, Greece
1	Poland	San Marino
1	Portugal	Czech Republic

12 points awarded by televoting
N.	Contestant	Nation(s) giving 12 points
8	Moldova	Czech Republic, Estonia, France, Latvia, Greece, Portugal, San Marino, Serbia
3	Iceland	Denmark, Finland, United Kingdom
2	Finland	Bulgaria, Poland
2	Serbia	Austria, Switzerland
1	Denmark	Iceland
1	Greece	Moldova
1	Portugal	Spain
1	San Marino	Georgia
1	Switzerland	Albania

=== Final ===
Winner

Split results of the final
Place	Combined		Jury		Televoting	
Place	Country	Points	Country	Points	Country	Points
1	Italy	524	Switzerland	267	Italy	318
2	France	499	France	248	Ukraine	267
3	Switzerland	432	Malta	208	France	251
4	Iceland	378	Italy	206	Finland	218
5	Ukraine	364	Iceland	198	Iceland	180
6	Finland	301	Bulgaria	140	Switzerland	165
7	Malta	255	Portugal	126	Lithuania	165
8	Lithuania	220	Russia	104	Russia	100
9	Russia	204	Ukraine	97	Serbia	82
10	Greece	170 (Note: Despite Greece finishing with the same number of points as Bulgaria, Greece is deemed to have finished in tenth place due to receiving a greater number of points in the televote.)	Greece	91	Greece	79
11	Bulgaria	170	Finland	83	Sweden	63
12	Portugal	153	Israel	73	Moldova	62
13	Moldova	115	Belgium	71	Norway	60
14	Sweden	109	Lithuania	55	Malta	47
15	Serbia	102	Moldova	53	Cyprus	44
16	Cyprus	94	Cyprus	50	Albania	35
17	Israel	93	Sweden	46	Azerbaijan	33
18	Norway	75	San Marino	37	Bulgaria	30
19	Belgium	74	Azerbaijan	32	Portugal	27
20	Azerbaijan	65	Albania	22	Israel	20
21	Albania	57	Serbia	20	San Marino	13
22	San Marino	50	Norway	15	Belgium	3
23	Netherlands	11	Netherlands	11	United Kingdom	0 (Note: Despite 4 countries finishing with 0 points, tiebreaking rules put the United Kingdom in 23rd place with the televote, Spain 24th, Germany 25th and the Netherlands 26th due to their running order positions.)
24	Spain	6	Spain	6	Spain	0
25	Germany	3	Germany	3	Germany	0
26	United Kingdom	0	United Kingdom	0	Netherlands	0

The results of the final were determined by televoting and jury voting in all thirty-nine participating countries. The announcement of the jury points was conducted by each country individually, with the country's spokesperson announcing their jury's favourite entry that received 12 points, with the remaining points shown on screen. Following the completion of the jury points announcement, the public points were announced as an aggregate by the contest hosts in ascending order starting from the country which received the fewest points from the jury.

Detailed jury voting results of the final
Voting procedure used: 100% televoting; 100% jury vote		Total score	Jury score	Televoting score	Jury vote																																						
Voting procedure used: 100% televoting; 100% jury vote		Total score	Jury score	Televoting score	Israel	Poland	San Marino	Albania	Malta	Estonia	North Macedonia	Azerbaijan	Norway	Spain	Austria	United Kingdom	Italy	Slovenia	Greece	Latvia	Ireland	Moldova	Serbia	Bulgaria	Cyprus	Belgium	Germany	Australia	Finland	Portugal	Ukraine	Iceland	Romania	Croatia	Czech Republic	Georgia	Lithuania	Denmark	Russia	France	Sweden	Switzerland	Netherlands
Contestants	Cyprus	94	50	44	3			7	4		2			6					12			1					7	4											2	2			
Contestants	Albania	57	22	35			2		12																													7					1
Contestants	Israel	93	73	20		6					8		8	3		6	4	1					2	3							7			5			1	1	5	5	4		4
Contestants	Belgium	74	71	3	6	3						3				1	5	6	3		3				4					5	6				3		7		3	6	1		6
Contestants	Russia	204	104	100	7	1					1	12						8	2	1		10			6	7	2	1	4	10		2		4	2					10	3	3	8
Contestants	Malta	255	208	47	5	4	7	8		1	5	7	12	8	4		7	5	6	2	10	7		5	10	5	8	12	1	4	5	1	12	3	7	1	3	4	4		12	6	7
Contestants	Portugal	153	126	27		8			7	5		2		5	7	7	6					2	5	6	1	1					2	10	10	1	12	8	6			8		7	
Contestants	Serbia	102	20	82				1			12																							7									
Contestants	United Kingdom	0	0	0																																							
Contestants	Greece	170	91	79			8	6	6			10	1	1				3				8	3	8	12				2			4							7	12			
Contestants	Switzerland	432	267	165	12	7	4	12	10	12	6		7	10	10	8		7		12	5	3	1		2	12	10	10	12	7	8	12	7	8	5	10	8	12	1	7	5		5
Contestants	Iceland	378	198	180		10				8	4		2	7	12	10	8	10		10	8	5	7			3	3	8	8	8	4			10	8	6	4	10		3	7	5	10
Contestants	Spain	6	6	0												2								4																			
Contestants	Moldova	115	53	62			5					8							10					12									6						12				
Contestants	Germany	3	3	0											2																		1										
Contestants	Finland	301	83	218		2	1	3	2	7					1	4	10	4		4			10	1	3	8						5	8		1			8				1	
Contestants	Bulgaria	170	140	30	1		3			6		1	6	4	5	5			8	5	1	12	6		5	6		2	10	12		8	2		4	4	2	6	6			10	
Contestants	Lithuania	220	55	165	10		6			2				2			12			6	4						1		3					2		3						4	
Contestants	Ukraine	364	97	267	4				5	4		6	3				1		1	7	6					10	5	5		2		3	5			7	12				8		3
Contestants	France	499	248	251	8		12	10	3	10	7	4	4	12	8	12	3	2	5	3	12	4	12	7	7		12	7	7	6	10	6	4	6	10		5				6	12	12
Contestants	Azerbaijan	65	32	33	2			2													2	6									3					5			8			2	2
Contestants	Norway	75	15	60													2				7										1							3			2		
Contestants	Netherlands	11	11	0											3									2				3		1						2							
Contestants	Italy	524	206	318		5	10	4		3	10		5		6			12	4	8			8	10	8	2	6	6	6	3	12	7	3	12	6	12	10		10		10	8	
Contestants	Sweden	109	46	63					8		3	5	10										4			4	4		5									2		1			
Contestants	San Marino	50	37	13		12		5	1							3			7																			5		4			

Detailed televoting results of the final
Voting procedure used: 100% televoting; 100% jury vote		Total score	Jury score	Televoting score	Televote																																						
Voting procedure used: 100% televoting; 100% jury vote		Total score	Jury score	Televoting score	Israel	Poland	San Marino	Albania	Malta	Estonia	North Macedonia	Azerbaijan	Norway	Spain	Austria	United Kingdom	Italy	Slovenia	Greece	Latvia	Ireland	Moldova	Serbia	Bulgaria	Cyprus	Belgium	Germany	Australia	Finland	Portugal	Ukraine	Iceland	Romania	Croatia	Czech Republic	Georgia	Lithuania	Denmark	Russia	France	Sweden	Switzerland	Netherlands
Contestants	Cyprus	94	50	44			8	2	2		6								12				2																12				
Contestants	Albania	57	22	35							10						10		7															1								7	
Contestants	Israel	93	73	20								12													2								1							5			
Contestants	Belgium	74	71	3																											1						2						
Contestants	Russia	204	104	100	10	2	1			6	1	6					7	1	1	10		12	6	7	3		5		1	1	4			3	5	4	4						
Contestants	Malta	255	208	47	5								3	3	2	6			3		4				1	2		8				3	2					2			2		1
Contestants	Portugal	153	126	27										1							2											2								8		8	6
Contestants	Serbia	102	20	82					4		12				12		4	12						5			3	2						12						3	1	12	
Contestants	United Kingdom	0	0	0																																							
Contestants	Greece	170	91	79			7	8										8				7	3	2	12					2					8	12							10
Contestants	Switzerland	432	267	165	6	7	3	12		2	7	4	2	7	5	1		5	4	4	3	4	1	3		4	2	5	7	6	7	6	5	5	3		6	6	5	6	5		7
Contestants	Iceland	378	198	180	1	8			5	3			10	5	10	10	6	3		5	10		5			5	6	12	12	3	6			4	7	1	3	12	1	4	10	5	8
Contestants	Spain	6	6	0																																							
Contestants	Moldova	115	53	62			6	7				1					2												2	8			12		12	2			3	7			
Contestants	Germany	3	3	0																																							
Contestants	Finland	301	83	218	4	6	4	3	7	12	2	5	6	2	4	7	8	4	6	8	5	5	7	8	4	6	8	3		5	8	12	6	6	4		7	7	8	1	12	4	4
Contestants	Bulgaria	170	140	30			2	5						8		8									7																		
Contestants	Lithuania	220	55	165	3	4			6	10			12	4	3	12	5			12	12	2			5	7	12	6	5		10	4	3		1	10		4	2		7	1	3
Contestants	Ukraine	364	97	267	12	12	5	4	1	5	4	8	5	6	7	4	12	7	5	6	8	10	8	6	6	10	4	10	10	10		8	7	8	10	6	12	1	7	12	4	2	5
Contestants	France	499	248	251	8	5	10	6	3	7	5	2	4	12	6	5	1	6	8	3	7	6	10	10	8	12	10	4	6	12	5	7	8	7	2	5	8	3	6		6	6	12
Contestants	Azerbaijan	65	32	33	2						3		1						2			1	4	4							3		4	2		3			4				
Contestants	Norway	75	15	60		3			10	4		7			1	2		2		2						1	1	1	4			1					5	8			8		
Contestants	Netherlands	11	11	0																																							
Contestants	Italy	524	206	318	7	10	12	10	12	8	8	10	7	10	8	3		10	10	7	6	8	12	12	10	8	7	7	8	7	12	5	10	10	6	8	10	5	10	10	3	10	2
Contestants	Sweden	109	46	63		1		1	8	1			8							1	1	3		1		3			3	4	2	10					1	10		2		3	
Contestants	San Marino	50	37	13								3					3																			7							

==== 12 points ====
Below is a summary of all 12 points received in the final. In the jury vote, France and Switzerland each received the maximum score of 12 points from eight countries, with Italy and Malta each receiving four sets of 12 points. Bulgaria, Greece, and Moldova received the maximum score from two countries, while Albania, Cyprus, Iceland, Lithuania, Portugal, Russia, San Marino, Serbia, and Ukraine were each awarded one set of 12 points.

In the public vote, Italy, Lithuania, Serbia, and Ukraine each received the maximum score of 12 points from five countries, with France receiving four sets of 12 points. Finland and Iceland received the maximum score from three countries, Cyprus, Greece, and Moldova were each awarded two sets of 12 points, and Israel, Russia, and Switzerland were each awarded one set of 12 points.

12 points awarded by juries
N.	Contestant	Nation(s) giving 12 points
8	France	Germany, Ireland, Netherlands, San Marino, Serbia, Spain, Switzerland, United Kingdom
8	Switzerland	Albania, Belgium, Denmark, Estonia, Finland, Iceland, Israel, Latvia
4	Italy	Croatia, Georgia, Slovenia, Ukraine
4	Malta	Australia, Norway, Romania, Sweden
2	Bulgaria	Moldova, Portugal
2	Greece	Cyprus, France
2	Moldova	Bulgaria, Russia
1	Albania	Malta
1	Cyprus	Greece
1	Iceland	Austria
1	Lithuania	Italy
1	Portugal	Czech Republic
1	Russia	Azerbaijan
1	San Marino	Poland
1	Serbia	North Macedonia
1	Ukraine	Lithuania

12 points awarded by televoting
N.	Contestant	Nation(s) giving 12 points
5	Italy	Bulgaria, Malta, San Marino, Serbia, Ukraine
5	Lithuania	Germany, Ireland, Latvia, Norway, United Kingdom
5	Serbia	Austria, Croatia, North Macedonia, Slovenia, Switzerland
5	Ukraine	France, Israel, Italy, Lithuania, Poland
4	France	Belgium, Netherlands, Portugal, Spain
3	Finland	Estonia, Iceland, Sweden
3	Iceland	Australia, Denmark, Finland
2	Cyprus	Greece, Russia
2	Greece	Cyprus, Georgia
2	Moldova	Czech Republic, Romania
1	Israel	Azerbaijan
1	Russia	Moldova
1	Switzerland	Albania

== Broadcasts ==
All participating broadcasters may choose to have on-site or remote commentators providing an insight about the show and voting information to their local audience. While they must broadcast at least the semi-final they are voting in and the final, most broadcasters air all three shows with different programming plans. Similarly, some non-participating broadcasters may still want to air the contest.

The European Broadcasting Union provided international live streams of both semi-finals and the final through their official YouTube channel with no commentary. The live streams were geo-blocked to viewers in Australia, Greece, Latvia, Lithuania, Ukraine, United States and the United Kingdom. After the live broadcasts, all three shows were made available for every country listed above except the United States.

Broadcasters and commentators in participating countries
Country	Broadcaster	Channel(s)	Show(s)	Commentator(s)	Ref(s)
Albania	RTSH	RTSH, RTSH Muzikë, Radio Tirana	All shows	Andri Xhahu	
Australia	SBS	SBS	All shows (Note: All shows were broadcast live, with a primetime rebroadcast in the evening between 21 and 23 May.)	Myf Warhurst and Joel Creasey	
Austria	ORF	ORF 1	All shows	Andi Knoll	
Azerbaijan	İTV		All shows	Murad Arif and Husniyya Maharramova	
Belgium	VRT	één	All shows	Peter Van de Veire	
Belgium	VRT	Ketnet	All shows	Dutch audio description	
Belgium	VRT	Radio 2	Final	Anja Daems and Showbizz Bart	
Belgium	RTBF	La Une, (Note: The second semi-final was broadcast on La Une on a 90-minute delay.) RTBF Auvio	All shows	Jean-Louis Lahaye and Fanny Jandrain (Note: Jandrain was a late replacement for Maureen Louys, who was absent due to testing positive for COVID-19.)	
Belgium	RTBF	VivaCité (Note: The final was broadcast on VivaCité on a 60-minute delay.)	SF1/Final	Jean-Louis Lahaye and Fanny Jandrain	
Bulgaria	BNT	BNT 1, BNT 4	All shows	Elena Rosberg and Petko Kralev	
Croatia	HRT	HRT 1	All shows	Duško Ćurlić	
Croatia	HRT	HR 2	Final	Unknown	
Cyprus	CyBC	RIK 1, RIK HD, RIK Sat	All shows	Louis Patsalides	
Czech Republic	ČT	ČT2	Semi-finals	Jan Maxián and Albert Černý	
Czech Republic	ČT	ČT1	Final	Jan Maxián and Albert Černý	
Denmark	DR	DR1	All shows	Henrik Milling and Nicolai Molbech	
Estonia	ERR	ETV	All shows	Marko Reikop	
Estonia	ERR	ETV+	All shows	Aleksandr Hobotov and Julia Kalenda	
Estonia	ERR	ERR	All shows	Sign language: Various interpreters	
Finland	Yle	Yle TV1	All shows	Finnish: Mikko Silvennoinen; Swedish: Eva Frantz and Johan Lindroos; Russian: Levan Tvaltvadze	
Finland	Yle	Yle Radio Suomi	All shows	Sanna Pirkkalainen and Toni Laaksonen	
Finland	Yle	Yle X3M	All shows	Eva Frantz and Johan Lindroos	
France	France Télévisions	Culturebox	Semi-finals	Laurence Boccolini	
France	France Télévisions	France 2	Final	Stéphane Bern and Laurence Boccolini	
Georgia	GPB	1TV	All shows	Nika Lobiladze	
Germany	ARD	One	All shows	Peter Urban	
Germany	ARD	Das Erste, Deutsche Welle	Final	Peter Urban	
Greece	ERT	ERT1	All shows	Maria Kozakou and Giorgos Kapoutzidis	
Greece	ERT	Deftero Programma, Voice of Greece	All shows	Dimitris Meidanis	
Greece	ERT	Deftero Programma, Voice of Greece	Final	Giorgos Katsaros	
Iceland	RÚV	RÚV	All shows	Gísli Marteinn Baldursson	
Iceland	RÚV	RUV.is	All shows	Alex Elliott	
Iceland	RÚV	RÚV 2	Semi-finals	Alex Elliott	
Iceland	RÚV	RÚV 2	Final	Sign language: Elsa G. Björnsdóttir	
Iceland	RÚV	Rás 2	SF2/Final	Unknown	
Ireland	RTÉ	RTÉ2	Semi-finals	Marty Whelan	
Ireland	RTÉ	RTÉ One	Final	Marty Whelan	
Ireland	RTÉ	RTÉ Radio 1	SF1	Neil Doherty and Zbyszek Zalinski	
Ireland	RTÉ	RTÉ 2fm	Final	Neil Doherty and Zbyszek Zalinski	
Israel	IPBC	Kan 11, Kan Educational, (Note: Due to the 2021 Israel–Palestine crisis, the shows would be deferred to Kan Educational in the event that the main broadcast on Kan 11 is interrupted.) Kan Tarbut	All shows	Asaf Liberman and Akiva Novick	
Italy	RAI	Rai 4, Rai Radio 2	Semi-finals	Ema Stokholma and Saverio Raimondo	
Italy	RAI	Rai 1	Final	Gabriele Corsi and Cristiano Malgioglio	
Italy	RAI	Rai Radio 2	Final	Ema Stokholma and Gino Castaldo	
Latvia	LTV	LTV1	Semi-finals	Toms Grēviņš	
Latvia	LTV	LTV1	Final	Toms Grēviņš and Marie N	
Lithuania	LRT	LRT televizija, LRT Radijas	All shows	Ramūnas Zilnys	
Malta	PBS	TVM	All shows	No commentary	
Moldova	TRM	Moldova 1, Radio Moldova	All shows	Doina Stimpovschi	
Netherlands	AVROTROS	NPO 1, BVN	All shows	Cornald Maas and Sander Lantinga	
Netherlands	AVROTROS	NPO 1 Extra	All shows	Sign language: Various interpreters	
Netherlands	AVROTROS	NPO Zappelin Extra	All shows	Dutch audio description	
Netherlands	AVROTROS	NPO Radio 2	Final	Wouter van der Goes and Frank van 't Hof	
North Macedonia	MRT	MRT 1, MRT 2	All shows	Eli Tanaskovska	
Norway	NRK	NRK1	All shows	Marte Stokstad	
Norway	NRK	NRK3	Final	Martin Lepperød and Adelina Ibishi	
Norway	NRK	NRK P1	Final	Ole-Christian Øen	
Poland	TVP	TVP1, TVP Polonia	All shows	Marek Sierocki and Aleksander Sikora	
Portugal	RTP	RTP1, RTP Internacional, RTP África	All shows (Note: The first semi-final was broadcast on a two-hour delay, starting at 22:15 WEST.)	José Carlos Malato and Nuno Galopim	
Romania	TVR	TVR 1, TVRi	All shows	Bogdan Stănescu	
Russia	C1R	Channel One	All shows	Yana Churikova and Yuri Aksyuta	
San Marino	SMRTV	San Marino RTV, Radio San Marino	All shows	Lia Fiorio and Gigi Restivo	
Serbia	RTS	RTS 1, RTS Planeta, RTS Svet	All shows	Duška Vučinić	
Serbia	RTS	Radio Belgrade 1	Final	Katarina Epštajn and Nikoleta Dojčinović	
Slovenia	RTVSLO	TV SLO 2	Semi-finals	Mojca Mavec	
Slovenia	RTVSLO	TV SLO 1	Final	Mojca Mavec	
Slovenia	RTVSLO	RTV 4D, Radio Val 202	All shows	Miha Šalehar, Neja Jerant and Uršula Zaletelj	
Spain	RTVE	La 2	Semi-finals	Tony Aguilar, Julia Varela and Víctor Escudero	
Spain	RTVE	La 1, TVE Internacional	Final	Tony Aguilar, Julia Varela and Víctor Escudero	
Spain	RTVE	Radio Nacional, Radio Exterior, Radio 5	Final	Imanol Durán	
Sweden	SVT	SVT1	All shows	Edward af Sillén and Christer Björkman	
Sweden	SVT	SR P4	All shows	Carolina Norén	
Switzerland	SRG SSR	SRF zwei	Semi-finals	Sven Epiney	
Switzerland	SRG SSR	SRF 1	Final	Sven Epiney	
Switzerland	SRG SSR	RTS 2	Semi-finals	Jean-Marc Richard and Nicolas Tanner	
Switzerland	SRG SSR	RTS 1	Final	Jean-Marc Richard, Nicolas Tanner and Joseph Gorgoni	
Switzerland	SRG SSR	RSI La 2	SF2	Clarissa Tami	
Switzerland	SRG SSR	RSI La 1	Final	Clarissa Tami and Sebalter	
Ukraine	UA:PBC	UA:First	All shows	Timur Miroshnychenko	
Ukraine	UA:PBC	UA:Ukrainian Radio	Final	Olena Zelinchenko	
Ukraine	UA:PBC	UA:Radio Promin	Final	Anna Zakletska and Dmytro Zakharchenko	
Ukraine	STB		All shows	Serhiy Prytula	
United Kingdom	BBC	BBC Four	Semi-finals	Scott Mills, Sara Cox (Note: Cox was a late replacement for Rylan Clark-Neal who was absent due to illness but still appeared in pre-recorded segments.) and Chelcee Grimes	
United Kingdom	BBC	BBC One	Final	Graham Norton	
United Kingdom	BBC	BBC Radio 2	Final	Ken Bruce	

Broadcasters and commentators in non-participating countries
Country/Territory	Broadcaster	Channel(s)	Show(s)	Commentator(s)	Ref(s)
Canada	Omni Television		All shows	No commentary	
Kazakhstan	Khabar	Khabar TV	All shows	Kaldybek Zhajsanbaj and Mahabbat Esen	
Kosovo	RTK		All shows	Unknown	
Slovakia	RTVS	Rádio FM	Final	Daniel Baláž, Lucia Haverlík, Pavol Hubinák and Juraj Malíček	
Suriname	ATV		Final	Unknown	
United States	NBCUniversal	Peacock	All shows	No commentary	(Note: Peacock is an over-the-top video streaming service owned by NBCUniversal Television and Streaming, which also owns NBC who is an associate member of the EBU for the United States. After announcing that NBC would broadcast the American Song Contest in 2022, the EBU later announced that Peacock had acquired rights to distribute both the Eurovision Song Contest 2021 and 2022 in the US. All three shows were streamed live with video-on-demand viewing available afterwards, with no commentary.)
United States	WJFD-FM		Final	Ewan Spence and Ross Middleton	

== Incidents and controversies ==
=== Disqualification of Belarus ===
Two days after "Ya nauchu tebya (I'll Teach You)" was announced as the Belarusian entry for the contest, the EBU ruled that the song did not comply with the contest's rules against political entries, and that the song was not eligible to compete in the contest unless it was modified or replaced. After failing to meet an extended deadline for submitting an eligible entry, with their second submission "Pesnya pro zaytsa (Song About Hares)" also being found to not comply with the rules, it was announced on 26 March 2021 that Belarus was disqualified from the contest.

=== Ukrainian rehearsal stand-in ===
Before Ukraine's second rehearsal on 12 May, the lead singer of Go_A, Kateryna Pavlenko, reported feeling unwell. In accordance with the contest's health and safety protocols, Pavlenko was required to quarantine in her hotel room. The other band members tested negative and were able to rehearse, with Dutch stand-in singer Emmie van Stijn providing vocals instead of Pavlenko. Pavlenko took a COVID-19 PCR test, which came back negative the following day, allowing her to perform again. Van Stijn received positive reactions for her performance, in particular for her pronunciation of the Ukrainian lyrics, and was invited to sit with the Ukrainian delegation in the green room during the first semi-final.

=== COVID-19 infections ===
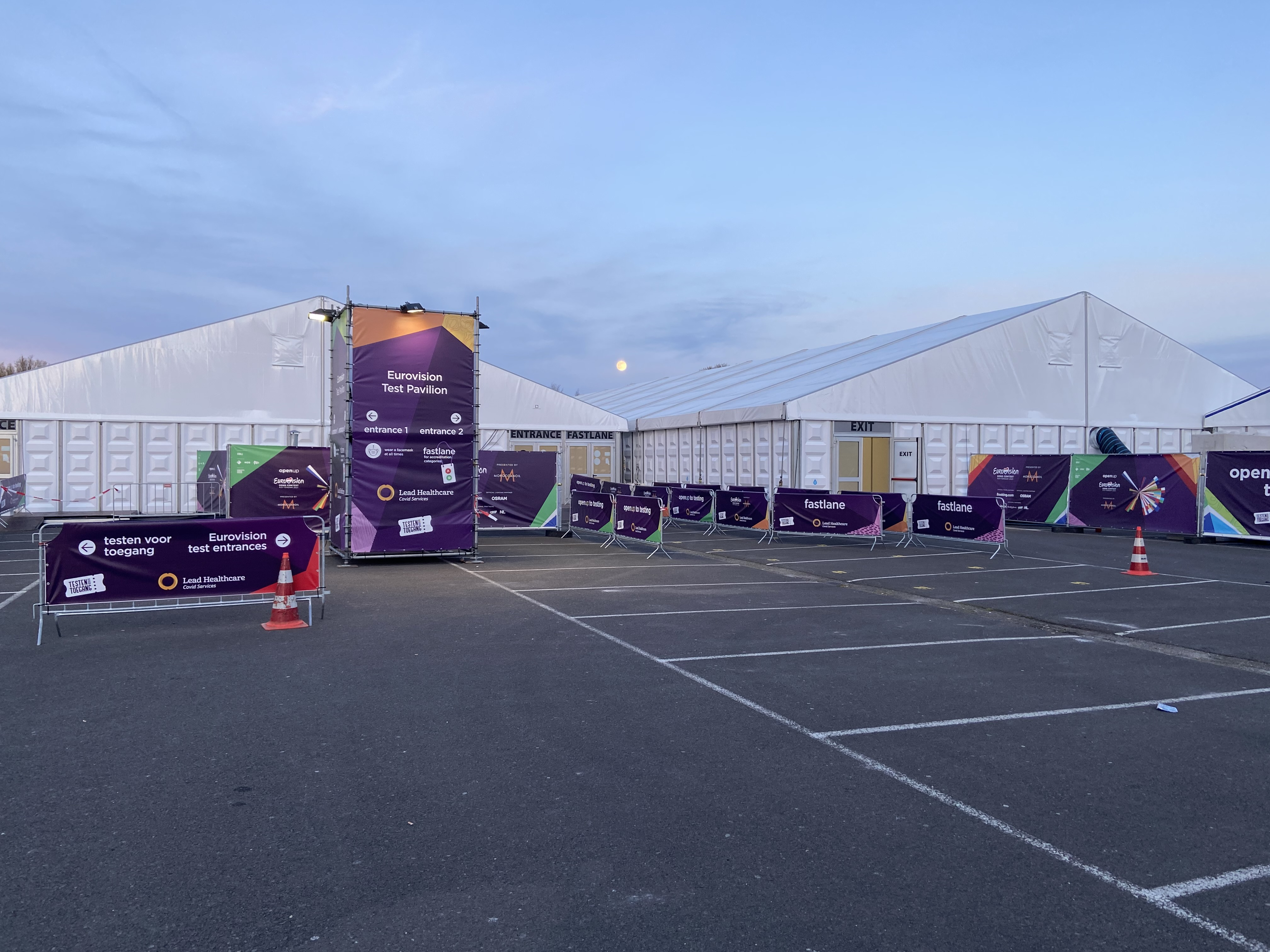
A COVID-19 testing zone was set up outside Rotterdam Ahoy during the Eurovision event weeks.

Ahead of the "Turquoise Carpet" event, one member of each of the Polish and Icelandic delegations tested positive for COVID-19. As a result, those delegations were absent from the event, having gone into self-isolation in accordance with the contest's health and safety protocols. The Romanian and Maltese delegations were also absent from the event on a precautionary measure, as they were based in the same hotel as the Polish and Icelandic delegations.

All other members of the Polish and Icelandic delegations tested negative, and remained in quarantine until the jury show of the second semi-final. However, it was later confirmed that a member of the Icelandic group Daði og Gagnamagnið had tested positive, and as a result, the group withdrew from performing in the live shows. Footage from their rehearsal at Rotterdam Ahoy was broadcast instead during both the jury show and the live show of the second semi-final; this footage was also shown in the final. The remaining members of the Polish delegation were subsequently released from isolation.

On 20 May, the EBU confirmed that Duncan Laurence had tested positive and would not perform live in the final. He was due to perform his winning song "Arcade" and his new single "Stars" during the interval, and present the points on behalf of the Dutch jury; the latter role was filled by Romy Monteiro. Pre-recorded rehearsal footage of Laurence's interval performance was broadcast instead during the final. Due to the positive test result, Laurence was also not present to hand over the trophy to the winner; the presenters handed over the trophy instead.

The day after the final, a member of the Norwegian delegation tested positive and was forced to remain in Rotterdam for isolation. It was later confirmed that six additional members of the delegation had tested positive after returning to Norway.

=== Technical issues ===
==== Jury show issues ====
During the jury show of the first semi-final, the Romanian, Ukrainian and Maltese delegations reported problems with their performances; most notably, Roxen was heard to be off-beat with the chorus of her song "Amnesia". The EBU later confirmed that in-ear monitoring issues had occurred and that all artists involved would be given a second chance to perform. No issues occurred during the second performances.

During San Marino's jury final performance, the rotating platform did not stop when it was supposed to, leading Senhit to have to jump from it while in motion. The Sammarinese delegation later filed a complaint, also claiming that all the camera shots were distorted due to these timing issues. The delegation offered to allow Senhit and Flo Rida to withdraw from the event, though they ultimately decided to stay. The contest's executive supervisor, Martin Österdahl, apologised to the delegation and reaffirmed that the issue would be addressed moving forward and that they would be protected to the highest degree.

==== Camera breaking prior to Ireland's performance ====
During the setup for Ireland's performance in the first semi-final, a camera broke, which caused an extended delay after the postcard was shown. Co-presenter Chantal Janzen improvised in the green room during the live broadcast to fill in the time.

=== False allegation of drug use ===
During a green room segment in the final, Damiano David, lead singer of the Italian band Måneskin, was claimed by some online viewers on social media to be seen snorting a line of cocaine when leaned over a table, although there were no drugs in the footage and the singer was sitting away from the table, close to the Italian delegation members. In the band's press conference following their victory, Torbjörn Ek, a journalist working at the Swedish newspaper Aftonbladet, asked about the allegations, which David denied by suggesting that fellow member Thomas Raggi had broken a glass which David was picking up off the floor, going on to say "I don't use drugs, please guys, do not say that." The band later released a statement on their official Instagram account, stating: "We are really shocked about what some people are saying about Damiano doing drugs. We really are AGAINST drugs and we never used cocaine. We are ready to get tested, cause we got nothing to hide." The EBU released a statement the following day, stating that the band, their management and the Italian head of delegation had denied any allegation, and the singer in question, Damiano, requested to be tested the same night, but as testing could not be immediately organized, he would "take a voluntary drug test after arriving home". It was also confirmed that "broken glass was found after an on site check". The allegations were mostly covered by the French press and briefly commented on by the French foreign minister Jean-Yves Le Drian, but the French participating broadcaster France Télévisions announced that it wouldn't file any official charges, while in the Italian press, it was described as a social media joke that had gone too far and become fake news.

On 24 May, the EBU released a statement confirming that no drug use took place in the green room during the final, following a negative drug test and inspection of all available footage. The EBU also expressed concern over "inaccurate speculation leading to fake news [that] has overshadowed the spirit and the outcome of the event and unfairly affected the band."

=== Dutch televoting issues ===
The EBU confirmed on 24 May that it encountered issues regarding the Dutch televote in the final. Numerous Dutch viewers complained on social media about their votes not being counted and had only received their confirmation texts hours after the show. The EBU later confirmed to NOS that those votes were not counted due to a problem with the Dutch branch of the telecom provider T-Mobile, while clarifying that it had no authority over the issue. The Dutch televoting results, therefore, remained valid.

== Reception ==
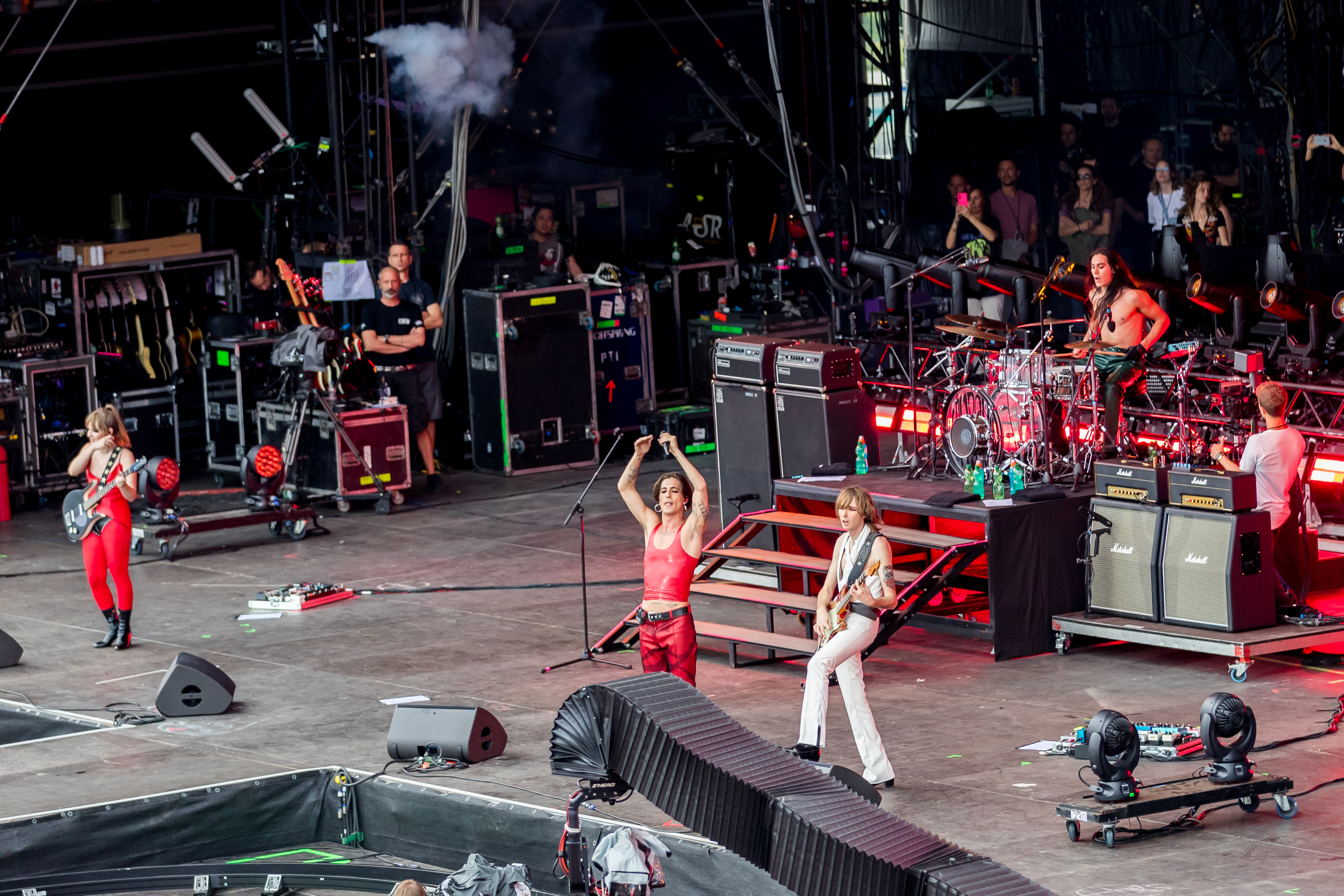
Måneskin performing at Rock am Ring, at Nürburgring, Germany, in June 2022.

Italy's win in the 2021 contest marked the breakthrough of its entrant, Måneskin, in the international music market. Following the contest, the band's releases, including their second studio album Teatro d'ira: Vol. I (2021), which contained their winning song "Zitti e buoni" as well as tracks "I Wanna Be Your Slave" and "Coraline", entered European and global weekly charts. "Zitti e buoni" and "I Wanna Be Your Slave" also entered the top ten of the Billboard Global Excl. U.S. chart. "Zitti e buoni" became the first Italian-language song in 30 years to chart on the top 20 of the UK Singles Chart, peaking at number 17, as well as "I Wanna Be Your Slave" peaking at number five, which was the first song by an Italian rock band to reach the UK top ten, thus making the band the first Eurovision winning act since Céline Dion to have two songs in the UK top 40, and a top ten hit with a non-contest song. Buoyed by viral success on video sharing service TikTok, their 2017 cover of "Beggin'" peaked at number six, thus making them the first Italian act and the first Eurovision-associated act to have two songs charting in the UK top ten at the same time. "Beggin'" later debuted on the US Billboard Hot 100 chart at number 78 and went on to peak at number 13, making them the second Eurovision winning act in recent history to enter the chart, after 2019 winner Duncan Laurence had done so earlier in the year with his winning song "Arcade".

Several other entries in the 2021 contest also impacted the charts after the event. France's entry "Voilà" entered the Billboard Global 200 chart dated 5 June 2021 at number 148, followed by Ukraine's entry "Shum" at number 158, which also marked the first time that a Ukrainian-language song had entered the chart. On the Billboard Global Excl. US chart also dated 5 June 2021, in addition to "Zitti e buoni" (at number 11), "Voilà" (at number 70) and "Shum" (at number 80), four other entries entered the chart: Finland's "Dark Side" at number 105, Switzerland's "Tout l'univers" at number 119, Iceland's "10 Years" at number 128, and Cyprus' "El Diablo" at number 170.

== Other awards ==
In addition to the main winner's trophy, the Marcel Bezençon Awards and the Barbara Dex Award were contested during the Eurovision Song Contest 2021. The OGAE, "General Organisation of Eurovision Fans" voting poll also took place before the contest.

=== Marcel Bezençon Awards ===
The Marcel Bezençon Awards, organised since 2002 by Sweden's then-Head of Delegation and 1992 representative Christer Björkman, and winner of the 1984 contest Richard Herrey, honours songs in the contest's final. The awards are divided into three categories: the Artistic Award, the Composers Award, and the Press Award. The winners were revealed shortly before the Eurovision final on 22 May.

Category	Country	Song	Artist	Songwriter(s)
Artistic Award	France	"Voilà"	Barbara Pravi	Barbara Pravi; Igit; Lili Poe
Press Award	France	"Voilà"	Barbara Pravi	Barbara Pravi; Igit; Lili Poe
Composers Award	Switzerland	"Tout l'univers"	Gjon's Tears	Gjon Muharremaj; Nina Sampermans; Wouter Hardy; Xavier Michel

=== OGAE ===
OGAE, an organisation of over forty Eurovision Song Contest fan clubs across Europe and beyond, conducts an annual voting poll first held in 2002 as the Marcel Bezençon Fan Award. After all votes were cast, the top-ranked entry in the 2021 poll was Malta's "Je me casse" performed by Destiny; the top five results are shown below.

Country	Song	Artist	Points
Malta	"Je me casse"	Destiny	363
Switzerland	"Tout l'univers"	Gjon's Tears	358
France	"Voilà"	Barbara Pravi	318
Lithuania	"Discoteque"	The Roop	301
Cyprus	"El Diablo"	Elena Tsagrinou	238

=== Barbara Dex Award ===
The Barbara Dex Award, created in 1997 by fansite House of Eurovision and organised by fansite Songfestival.be since 2017, was awarded to the performer voted to have worn the most notable outfit. The top-ranked entry this year was Norway's representative Tix, who was the last person to ever receive the award, due to its cancellation the following year.

Place	Country	Artist
1	Norway	Tix
2	Romania	Roxen
3	Croatia	Albina
4	United Kingdom	James Newman
5	Israel	Eden Alene

=== Eurovision Awards ===
The Eurovision Awards, first held in 2021, saw competing acts celebrated across ten categories. Shortlists were determined by major Eurovision fansites and podcasts, with editors and presenters nominating their favourites in each category; the final result was determined by followers of the official Eurovision Instagram channel who cast votes for their favourite act.

Winners are listed first, highlighted in boldface, and indicated with a double dagger (‡). Runners-up are indicated with a single dagger (†).

Most Innovative Staging	Best Vocals
**Ukraine: Go_A ‡**; Cyprus: Elena Tsagrinou; France: Barbara Pravi †; Greece: Stefania; Switzerland: Gjon's Tears	**Switzerland: Gjon's Tears ‡**; Albania: Anxhela Peristeri; Israel: Eden Alene †; Malta: Destiny; Portugal: The Black Mamba
Most Iconic Prop	Best Non-Qualifier
**Russia: Manizha (Dress) ‡**; Iceland: Daði og Gagnamagnið (Circular piano) †; San Marino: Senhit (Head dress); Spain: Blas Cantó (Moon); United Kingdom: James Newman (Trumpets)	**Croatia: Albina ‡**; Australia: Montaigne; Czech Republic: Benny Cristo; Denmark: Fyr og Flamme †; Poland: Rafał
Best Spokesperson	Best Dressed
**Iceland: Hannes Óli Ágústsson (as Olaf Yohansson from Eurovision Song Contest: The Story of Fire Saga) ‡**; Australia: Joel Creasey; Germany: Barbara Schöneberger; Moldova: Sergey Stepanov (a.k.a. "Epic Sax Guy") †; Sweden: Carola	**Italy: Måneskin ‡**; Iceland: Daði Freyr; Norway: Tix †; Sweden: Tusse; Ukraine: Go_A
Best Hairstyle	Best Choreography
**Serbia: Hurricane ‡**; Cyprus: Elena Tsagrinou; Israel: Eden Alene †; Netherlands: Jeangu Macrooy; Spain: Blas Cantó	**Lithuania: The Roop ‡**; Cyprus: Elena Tsagrinou; Iceland: Daði og Gagnamagnið; Malta: Destiny; Serbia: Hurricane †
Best Official Video	Moment of the Year
**Italy: Måneskin — "Zitti e buoni" ‡**; Germany: Jendrik — "I Don't Feel Hate"; Iceland: Daði og Gagnamagnið — "10 Years" †; Moldova: Natalia Gordienko — "Sugar"; Ukraine: Go_A — "Shum"	**Four 0 points in a row ‡**; Daði og Gagnamagnið still participate; Damiano David: "Rock 'n' roll never dies!" †; Flo Rida makes an appearance; James Newman's champagne celebration

== Official album ==
Cover art of the official album

Eurovision Song Contest: Rotterdam 2021 is the official compilation album of the contest, put together by the European Broadcasting Union and released by Universal Music Group digitally on 16 April 2021 and physically on 23 April 2021. The album features all 39 entries including the semi-finalists that failed to qualify for the final.

=== Charts ===
Chart performance for Eurovision Song Contest: Rotterdam 2021
Chart (2021)	Peak position
Australian Albums (ARIA)	23
Austrian Compilation Albums (Ö3 Austria)	2
Dutch Compilation Albums (Compilation Top 30)	1
German Compilation Albums (Offizielle Top 100)	2
Greek Albums (IFPI)	5
Irish Compilation Albums (IRMA)	26
Swedish Albums (Sverigetopplistan)	54
UK Compilation Albums (Official Charts)	3
US Top Compilation Albums (Billboard)	12

== See also ==
- Junior Eurovision Song Contest 2021
