= I Don't Feel Hate =

2021 song by Jendrik Sigwart

Single by Jendrik Sigwart
- Released: 25 February 2021
- Length: 2:56
- Label: Polydor; Universal Music Group
- Songwriters: Jendrik Sigwart; Christoph Oswald
- Producer: Christoph Oswald

Music video
- "I Don't Feel Hate" on YouTube

Eurovision Song Contest 2021 entry
- Country: Germany
- Artist: Jendrik Sigwart
- Language: English
- Composers: Jendrik Sigwart; Christoph Oswald
- Lyricists: Jendrik Sigwart; Christoph Oswald

Finals performance
- Final result: 25th
- Final points: 3

Entry chronology
- ◄ "Violent Thing" (2020)
- "Rockstars" (2022) ►

"I Don't Feel Hate" is a song by German singer Jendrik Sigwart. The song represented Germany in the Eurovision Song Contest 2021 in Rotterdam, the Netherlands.

== Music video ==
The music video was released on the Eurovision Song Contest's YouTube channel on 25 February 2021. The music video features Jendrik Sigwart, along with the "middelfinger," worn by Sophia Euskirchen. The music video also features numerous of Jendrik's friends, including Myriam Kuppers, Elvin Karahurt, Madina Frey, Lasarah Sattler, Helge Lodder, and Simon Staiger. The music video starts off with the six mentioned waiting at a laundromat, all showing significant boredom. Suddenly, the "middle finger" and Jendrik arrives, with Jendrik on a sofa being pushed by the "middle finger." Awkwardness and confusion fills the room and everyone is silent, until one suddenly says "What the fu-' before being cut off by Jendrik, now playing "I Don't Feel Hate". Throughout the video, numerous examples of "hate" are shown, including sexism, pollution, etc.

After a music interlude, the first form of hate is shown- bodyshaming. Simon is shown to be auditioning for a show called "Germany's Next Little Miss Sunshine", where he is relentlessly bullied by the judges for his body shape, throwing tomatoes at him. Next, Elvin is shown to be a cleaner and picking up trash, presumably poor. Others, who are sitting on a bench (and presumably more rich and of higher class) see her and decide to throw litter at her and the ground, showing discrimination on someone's status and class. The video now cuts over to Helge, who is wishing to go into a nightclub. However, Helge is rejected because he is wearing makeup, and the bouncers hold up a sign that says "Makeup is only for women." After more bullying for all three, the three all fight back against their respective bullies.

After the first chorus, Lasarah, who is shown to be a Muslim, is discriminated against. Lasarah is shown to be uncomfortable in a pool with others around her gossiping. Next, Myriam is shown to be baking many cakes and pastries, only for the crowd who wants them to not be satisfied and always want more. Lastly, Madina is shown in the middle of night walking alone, when a man decides to sexually assault Madina. The video cuts off to Jendrik, then back to all three who are now realizing what's happening. They fight back by beating them, throwing the person like a ragdoll, and smashing them into cakes. After the tap dance, the crew are all now shown to be celebrating together. However, just before the end, it all goes into chaos one last time, with the victims finally defeating the bullies. The video ends with Madina, after killing the sexual assaulter pulling an umbrella of presumably his anus.

According to Jendrik on his Instagram, the stories shown in the music video are based on colors of the LGBTQ+ pride flag, with each color showing a form of disrespect. During the week of 26 April, he would feature each story and share experiences sent in by fans.

Person	Color	Form of disrespect	Story
Simon Staiger	Yellow	Bodyshaming	Light/Optimism
Elvin Karahurt	Green	Discrimination on someone's political views, status, class, nature	Nature
Helge Lodder	Red	LGBTQI+ discrimination	Life
Lasarah Sattler	Purple	Religious beliefs	Spirit
Myriam Kuppers	Blue	Public hate, pressure from the public	Harmony
Madina Frey	Orange	Sexism	Healing

== Eurovision Song Contest ==
=== Internal selection ===
On 6 February 2021, NDR confirmed that Jendrik Sigwart will represent Germany in the 2021 contest.

=== In Eurovision ===
The 65th edition of the Eurovision Song Contest took place in Rotterdam, the Netherlands and consisted of two semi-finals on 18 May and 20 May 2021, and the grand final on 22 May 2021. According to the Eurovision rules, all participating countries, except the host nation and the "Big Five", consisting of France, Germany, Italy, Spain and the United Kingdom, are required to qualify from one of two semi-finals to compete for the final, although the top 10 countries from the respective semi-final progress to the grand final. As Germany is a member of the "Big Five", the song automatically advanced to the final, which was held on 22 May 2021 at the Rotterdam Ahoy in Rotterdam, Netherlands. The song had received 3 points from the international juries and 0 points from the audience, ending on the second to last, 25th position in the contest.

Due to Eurovision rules, the "middelfinger" was not allowed on stage, so Jendrik decided to find a loophole by making Sophia wear a peace sign- however, the index finger was controlled with her arm, so whenever Sophia put down her arm, the peace sign suddenly turned into a "middelfinger" once more. The costume was found to be compliant with the rules, and Sophia was able to wear the peace sign on stage.

== Track listing ==
- Digital download
1. "I Don't Feel Hate" – 2:56
2. "I Don't Feel Hate - Laid Back Version" – 3:24
3. "I Don't Feel Hate - Instrumental Version" – 2:56

== Charts ==
Chart performance for "I Don't Feel Hate"
Chart (2021)	Peak position
Lithuania (AGATA)	79
Netherlands (Single Tip)	7
Sweden Heatseeker (Sverigetopplistan)	17
UK Singles Downloads (Official Charts)	71
