= Ahmad Joudeh =

Syrian-Dutch dancer (born 1990)

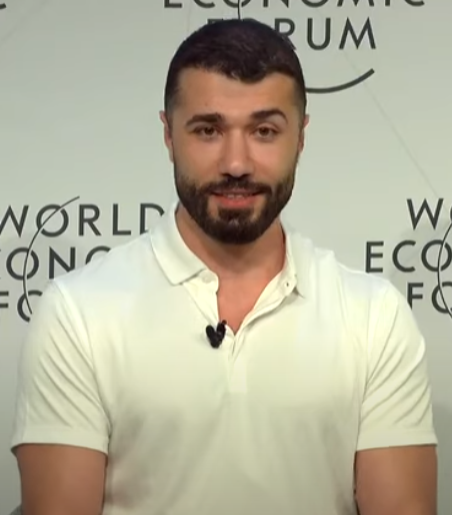
- Speaking at the 2023 World Economic Forum
- Born: 4 April 1990 (age 36); Syria
- Occupations: Dancer, choreographer
- Years active: 2007–present
- Height: 190 cm (6 ft 3 in)
- Website: www.ahmadjoudeh.com

Ahmad Joudeh (born 4 April 1990) is a Dutch ballet dancer and choreographer. He was born and raised as a stateless refugee in Syria. He moved to the Netherlands with help of the Dutch National Ballet Company in 2016. He is currently internationally active as an artist. In 2021, he obtained Dutch citizenship.

== Early life ==
Born in 1990, Joudeh grew up in Yarmouk, a Palestinian refugee camp in Damascus. His mother is Syrian and his father is Palestinian. Although his father did not approve of his interest in dance, Joudeh persisted, studying dance in Damascus.

From 2007 until 2016, he lived in Damascus, studying dance, and teaching ballet to support himself, and to orphaned and disabled children free of charge. His mother still lives in Syria. His father is an asylum seeker in Germany, where the two reconciled after an estrangement of eleven years.

== Dance ==
In 2014 he was a contestant in the Arab version of So You Think You Can Dance. He made it to the semi-finals. His appearances brought him to the attention of Dutch filmmaker Roozbeh Kaboly, who produced a documentary that aired on Dutch television.

Joudeh has also produced several short YouTube videos that depict him dancing in Syria.

== Dutch documentaries ==
In 2016 Roozbeh Kaboly, from the Dutch news program Nieuwsuur, made a 50-minute documentary about Ahmad called Dance or Die. It depicts him dancing in the ruins of the camp where he had grown up, visiting his family's former home in Palmyra, which has been destroyed, with his mother, and the ancient Roman theater of Palmyra, where he dances. Joudeh also takes the filmmakers to his dance studio in Damascus, where some of his young students talk about their lives, and what dance means to them. The ancient Roman theater in Palmrya was subsequently destroyed by ISIL.

In 2018, a second film about Joudeh, Dance for Peace, which includes his meeting and reconciliation with his father at his refugee camp in Berlin, was broadcast on Dutch television on the Nieuwsuur program. It depicts his life once he has moved to the Netherlands and has begun dancing with the Dutch National Ballet Company. Dance or Die has been awarded with an Emmy in the category Arts Programming at the International Emmy Awards in New York.

== Life in the Netherlands ==
After the documentaries aired, Joudeh received invitations to dance from a number of countries, including the U.S., Switzerland and Belgium. He decided to go to the Netherlands at the invitation of Ted Brandsen, artistic director of the Dutch National Ballet Company. Brandsen also started a crowd funder titled Dance for Peace to support Joudeh.

On 20 May 2021, Joudeh performed during the interval of the second semi-final of Eurovision Song Contest 2021 in Rotterdam alongside BMX rider Dez Maarsen.
