= Jendrik Sigwart =

German singer-songwriter

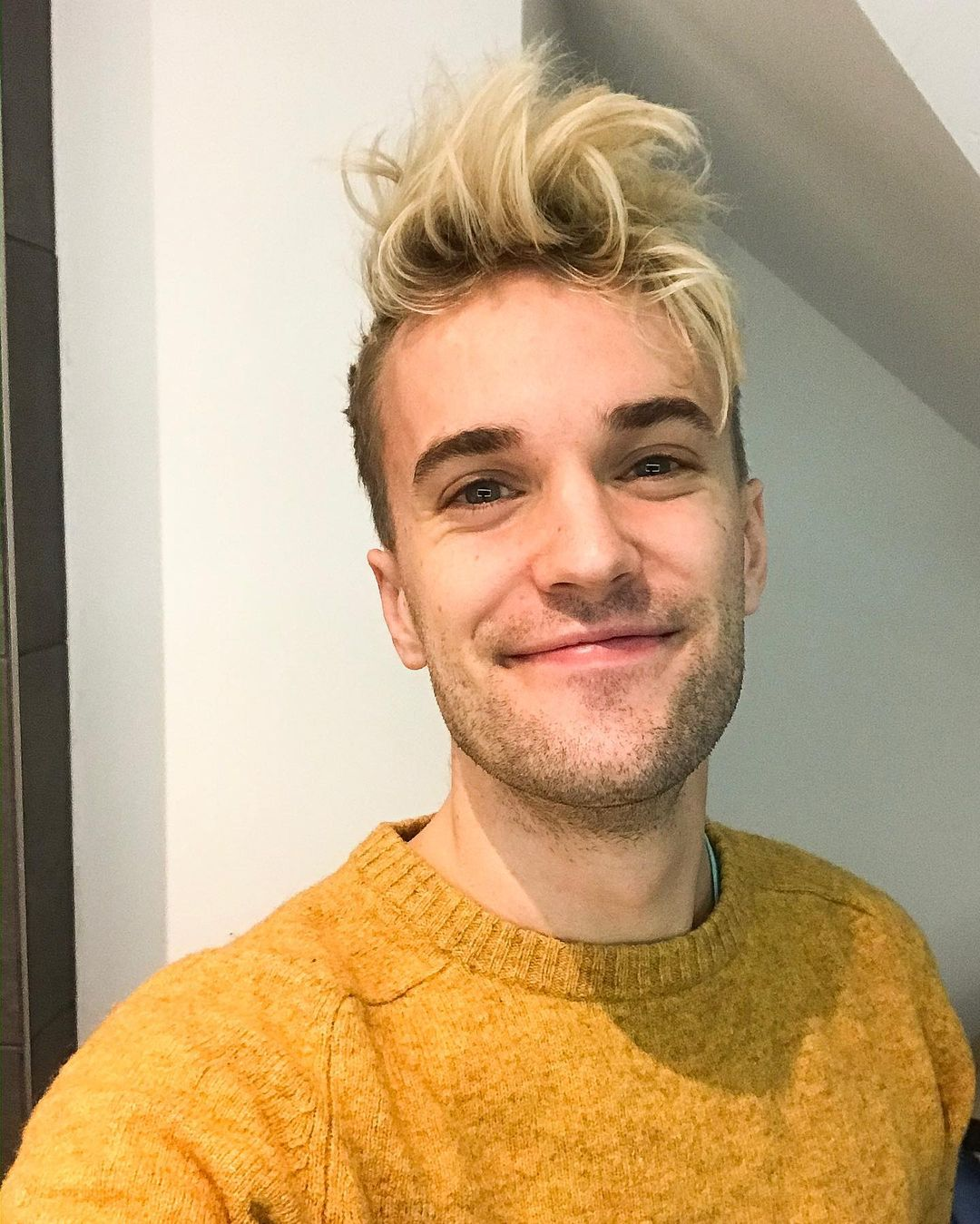
- Sigwart in 2021

Background information
- Also known as: Jendrik
- Born: 27 August 1994 (age 31); Hamburg, Germany
- Genres: Pop
- Occupations: Singer; Songwriter; Musical theatre actor
- Instruments: Vocals; Ukulele
- Years active: 2016–present

Jendrik Sigwart (German pronunciation: [ˈjɛndʁɪk ˈziːkvaʁt]; born 27 August 1994), better known by the mononym Jendrik, is a German singer and musical performer who represented Germany at the Eurovision Song Contest 2021 in Rotterdam, Netherlands with his song "I Don't Feel Hate".

== Early life and career ==
Jendrik Sigwart grew up in Hamburg-Volksdorf and has four siblings. He learned piano and violin as a teenager and studied musicals for four years at the Institute for Music at the Osnabrück University of Applied Sciences. While still a student, he appeared in various musicals, including German productions of My Fair Lady, Hairspray and Peter Pan. Sigwart began his career in 2016, where he released "Dibdibidi".

== Eurovision ==
On 6 February 2021, it was announced that he had been selected internally to represent Germany at Eurovision Song Contest in Rotterdam bypassing the German representative to the Eurovision Song Contest 2020 Ben Dolic.

Sigwart self-penned the entry, "I Don't Feel Hate". It was released on 25 February, 2021. A music video was also released. The song was produced by Christoph Oswald.

At Eurovision, Sigwart performed 15th in the running order. He ultimately finished 25th (second last) in the final, receiving three jury points and zero televote points.

== Personal life ==
Sigwart lives in Hamburg with his boyfriend Jan.

== Discography ==
=== Extended plays ===
Title	Details
The-Gonna-End-Up-Somewhere-Anyway	Released: 8 April 2024; Label: Self-released; Formats: Digital download, streaming
The-Little-Summer-Morning-Live-Band-Aid	Released: 6 June 2024; Label: Self-released; Formats: Digital download, streaming
The-Acoustic-Birthday-ExP	Released: 20 September 2024; Label: Self-released; Formats: Digital download, streaming
The-Never-Ending-Fall	Released: 1 December 2024; Label: Self-released; Formats: Digital download, streaming
The-German-Winter-ExP	Released: 31 December 2024; Label: Self-released; Formats: Digital download, streaming

=== Singles ===
Title	Year	Peak chart positions			Album
Title	Year	LTU	SWE Heat.	UK Down.	Album
"Dibdibidi"	2016	—	—	—	The-Little-Summer-Morning- Live-Band-Aid
"I Don't Feel Hate"	2021	79	17	71	Non-album singles
"I Can't Explain It I ♥️ U"	2024	—	—	—	Non-album singles
"Stronger From It"	2024	—	—	—	Non-album singles
"Parallel Dimension"	2024	—	—	—	Non-album singles
"How to Stay Optimistic?"	2024	—	—	—	Non-album singles
"The Neighbour Song"	2024	—	—	—	Non-album singles
"Interview with a Ghost"	2024	—	—	—	Non-album singles
"—" denotes a recording that did not chart or was not released in that territory.

Preceded by Ben Dolic with "Violent Thing"	Germany in the Eurovision Song Contest; 2021	Succeeded by Malik Harris with "Rockstars"
