= Baller (song) =

2025 song by Abor & Tynna

- "Baller" CD single cover

Single by Abor & Tynna

from the album Bittersüß
- Language: German; English
- A-side: "Songs gehasst"
- Released: 24 January 2025
- Genre: Pop; electronic
- Length: 2:39 (original version); 3:00 (Eurovision version)
- Label: Jive
- Songwriters: Attila Bornemisza; Tünde Bornemisza; Alexander Hauer
- Producer: Hauer

Abor & Tynna singles chronology
"Seifenblasen" (2024)	"Baller" (2025)

Music videos
- "Baller" on YouTube "Baller" (acoustic version) on YouTube

Eurovision Song Contest 2025 entry
- Country: Germany
- Artist: Abor & Tynna
- Languages: German; English
- Composers: Attila Bornemisza; Tünde Bornemisza; Alexander Hauer
- Lyricists: A. Bornemisza; T. Bornemisza; Hauer

Finals performance
- Final result: 15th
- Final points: 151

Entry chronology
- ◄ "Always on the Run" (2024)
- "Fire" (2026) ►

Official performance video
- "Baller" (second semi-final) on YouTube "Baller" (grand final) on YouTube

"Baller" (German pronunciation: [ˈbalɐ]; transl. "Shoot" or "Pop") is a song by Austrian music duo Abor & Tynna from their debut studio album, Bittersüß. It was released on 24 January 2025 through Jive Records. "Baller" represented Germany in the Eurovision Song Contest 2025.

It gained popularity across Europe in the weeks after Eurovision and experienced strong chart success throughout the continent. It reached number one in Lithuania and Latvia, the top five in Germany, Switzerland, Luxembourg and Austria as well as the top 10 in Finland and Poland.

== Background and composition ==
Following his highly anticipated comeback to television in 2024, German entertainer and songwriter Stefan Raab was announced as the head presenter of the 2025 selection through a show called Chefsache ESC 2025 – Wer singt für Deutschland? After multiple unsatisfying placements in previous years, German broadcasters ARD and RTL joined forces with Raab to help select a candidate. The Austrian music duo Abor & Tynna who had previously opened for Nina Chuba's Glas tour in 2024 entered the contest as one of nearly 3,300 contestants.

"Baller" was released as the lead single for their debut studio album, Bittersüß, on 24 January 2025. The song is a "modern German pop song" with stylistic effects that reminded Raab of the works of Udo Lindenberg. The song was self-written and self-produced by the duo alongside producer Alexander Hauer. Accompanied by Tynna's "husky" vocals and a "catchy" hook, it combines elements of electronic music and hip-hop.

On 25 April 2025, a Hungarian version titled "Lángra gyújtom az eget" ("I'll Set the Sky on Fire") was released, which changed the song's composition to an acoustic ballad.

== Eurovision Song Contest 2025 ==
=== Chefsache ESC 2025 – Wer singt für Deutschland? ===
In a competition spanning four shows from 14 February to 1 March 2025, the selection of 3,281 applicants was narrowed down to 24 competing acts who performed cover songs and their own original songs. Following the elimination of 15 more acts, the final and superfinal took place on 1 March. As opposed to previous years, the winner was solely selected through public voting. An early favourite of jury panel members Conchita Wurst and Nico Santos, the duo won the public voting with 34.9% of all the votes. As a nod to their father, a cellist of the Vienna Philharmonic, their performance most notably included the destruction of a cello.

=== At Eurovision ===
The Eurovision Song Contest 2025 took place at St. Jakobshalle in Basel, Switzerland, and consisted of two semi-finals held on the respective dates of 13 and 15 May and the final on 17 May 2025. As Germany is a member of the Big Five, "Baller" automatically qualified for the grand final. Nevertheless, the song was performed in the second semi-final albeit in a non-competitive spot, between Israel's Yuval Raphael and Serbia's Princ.

Abor & Tynna performed a repeat of their performance in the grand final on 17 May. The song was performed 16th, after Poland's Justyna Steczkowska and before Greece's Klavdia. In the final, "Baller" received 77 points from the juries (including two sets of 12 points from Czechia and Ukraine) and 74 points from the televote (including one set of 12 points from the artists' native Austria), making a total of 151 points, resulting in 15th place.

== Track listing ==
Digital download/streaming

1. "Songs gehasst" – 3:22
2. "Baller" – 2:39

Digital download/streaming – Acoustic Hungarian version

1. "Baller" (acoustic Hungarian version) – 3:39

Digital download/streaming – NoWifi Remix

1. "Baller" (NoWifi remix) – 2:47

Digital download/streaming – English edit

1. "Baller – English Edit"– 2:47

CD single (Sony 19802917112)

1. "Baller"
2. "Baller" – Acoustic Version
3. "Baller" – Acoustic Hungarian Version
4. "Baller" – Karaoke Version
5. "Baller" – Abor Remix

== Charts ==
=== Weekly charts ===
2025 weekly chart performance for "Baller"
Chart (2025)	Peak position
Austria (Ö3 Austria Top 40)	3
CIS Airplay (TopHit)	166
Finland (Suomen virallinen lista)	9
Germany (GfK)	3
Global 200 (Billboard)	80
Greece International (IFPI)	3
Greece International (IFPI) NoWifi remix	26
Iceland (Tónlistinn)	12
Ireland (IRMA)	31
Israel (Mako Hitlist)	89
Latvia Airplay (TopHit)	27
Latvia Streaming (LaIPA)	1
Lithuania (AGATA)	1
Luxembourg (Billboard)	4
Netherlands (Single Top 100)	26
Norway (VG-lista)	37
Poland (Polish Airplay Top 100)	28
Poland (Polish Streaming Top 100)	10
Portugal (AFP)	111
Sweden (Sverigetopplistan)	14
Spain (Promusicae)	76
Switzerland (Schweizer Hitparade)	5
UK Singles (Official Charts)	34
UK Dance (Official Charts)	7

2026 weekly chart performance for "Baller"
Chart (2026)	Peak position
Lithuania Airplay (TopHit)	83

=== Monthly charts ===
2025 monthly chart performance for "Baller"
Chart (2025)	Peak position
Lithuania Airplay (TopHit)	11

2026 monthly chart performance for "Baller"
Chart (2026)	Peak position
Lithuania Airplay (TopHit)	91

=== Year-end charts ===
Year-end chart performance
Chart (2025)	Position
Lithuania Airplay (TopHit)	56

== Certifications ==
Certifications for "Baller"
Region	Certification	Certified units/sales
Austria (IFPI Austria)	Gold	15,000^{‡}
Switzerland (IFPI Switzerland)	Gold	15,000^{‡}
^{‡} Sales+streaming figures based on certification alone.

== Release history ==
Release dates and formats for "Baller"
Region	Date	Format(s)	Version	Label	Ref.
Various	24 January 2025	Digital download; streaming	Original	Jive	
Various	25 April 2025	Digital download; streaming	Acoustic Hungarian	Jive	
Various	8 May 2025	Digital download; streaming	NoWifi remix	Jive	
Germany	16 May 2025	CD	Remix EP	Jive	
Various	6 June 2025	Digital download; streaming	English edit	Jive	
