= E-Werk =

E-Werk may refer to of a number of music venues across Germany, including

- E-Werk (Berlin)
- E-Werk (Cologne)
- E-Werk (Erlangen)
- E-Werk (Saarbrücken) (de:E-Werk (Saarbrücken))
