= Feuerschwanz =

German medieval metal band

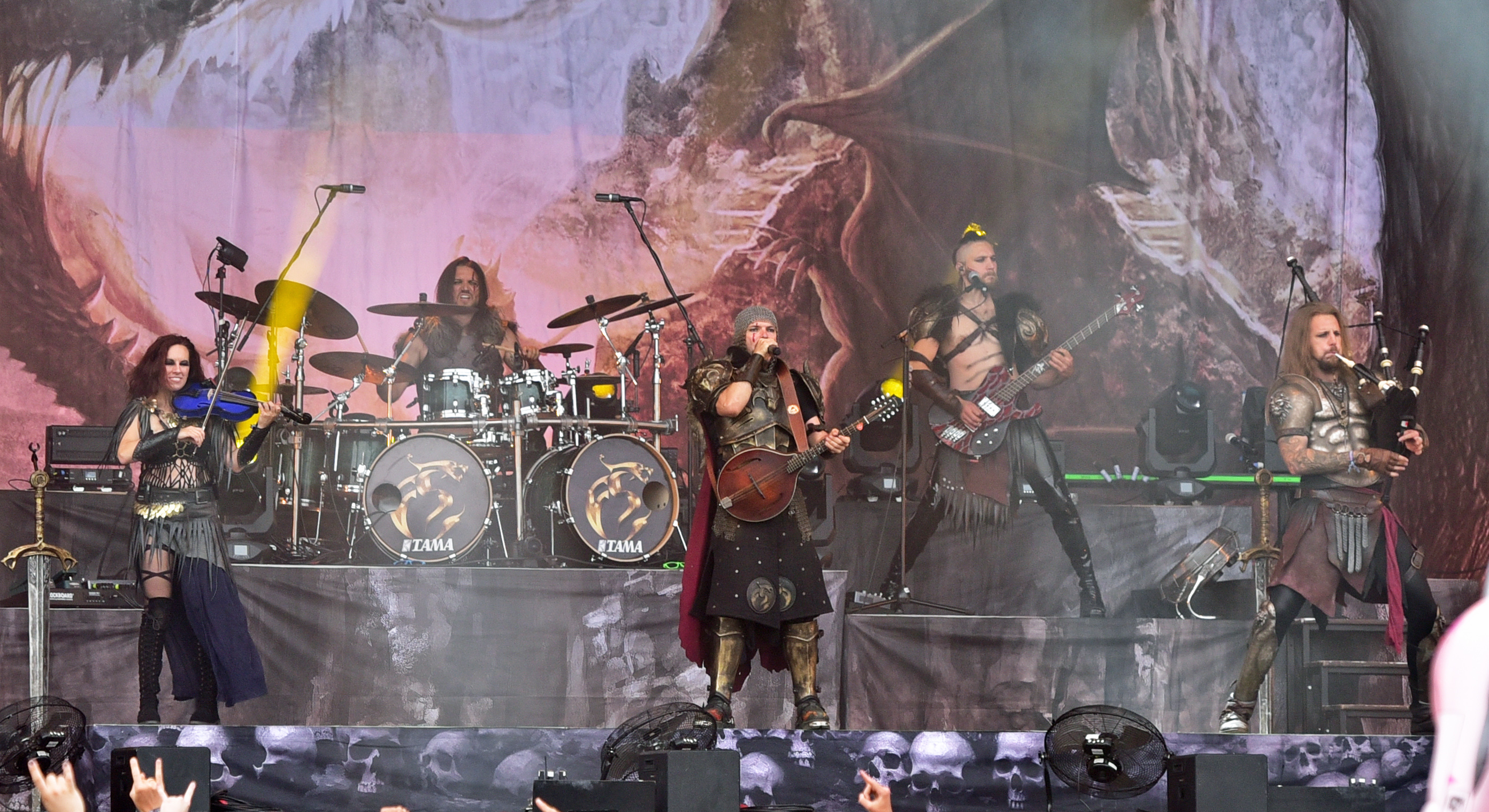
- Feuerschwanz at Wacken Open Air 2024

Background information
- Origin: Erlangen, Bavaria, Germany
- Genres: Medieval metal, folk metal, power metal Earlier: medieval folk rock, comedy rock
- Years active: 2004–present
- Members: Peter Henrici; Stephanie Pracht; Hans Platz; Benjamin Metzner; Jam Jamaszyk; Rolf Hering; Hela; Jenny Diehl
- Past members: Andre Linke; Tobias Heindl; Bastian Brenner; Jan Schindler; Marina Regler; Felix Fischer; Robert Gruss
- Website: feuerschwanz.de

Feuerschwanz (German for "fire tail") is a German medieval metal band founded in 2004 in Erlangen.

== History ==
=== 2003–2013: Formation and early years ===
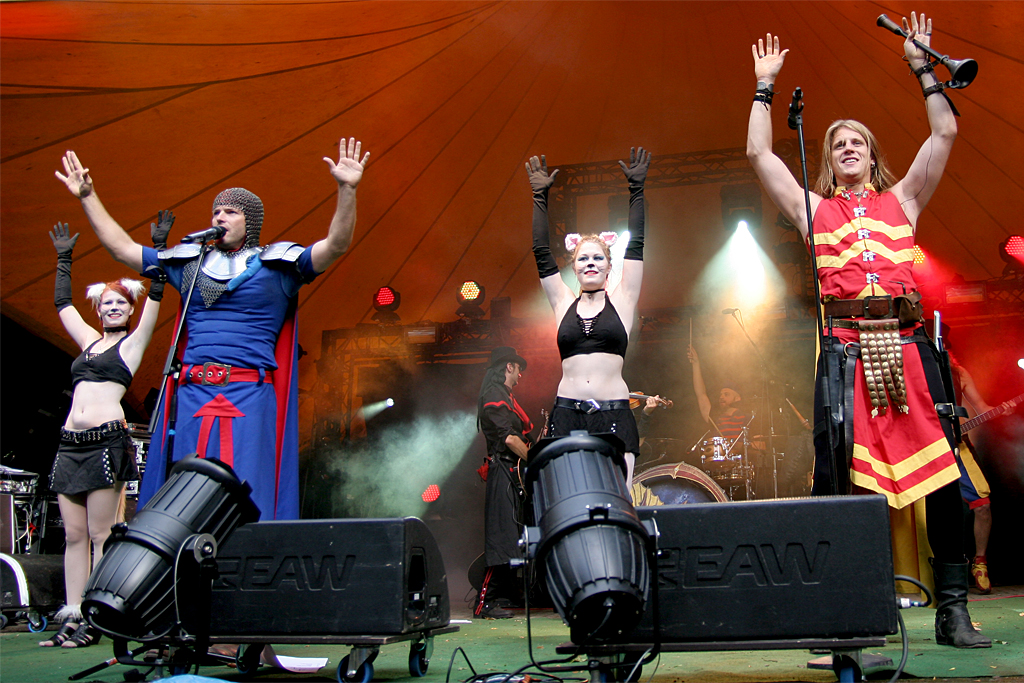
Feuerschwanz in 2012

Peter Henrici, a bassist for the band Merlons Lichter at the time, originally had the idea to create a comedic medieval rock band in 2000, as he felt that the genre of medieval folk rock was taking itself too seriously. He, along with Tobias Heindl, the violinist of Fiddler's Green, and Andre Linke, a fellow bassist, came together to form Feuerschwanz. Soon after, Bastian Brenner and Jan Schindler joined on the flutes and drums respectively, with Schindler later switching to the bass.

In November 2005, their first studio album Prima Nocte was released. Heindl left the band soon after, and Stephanie Pracht replaced him on the violin.

In January 2007, Brenner left the group and was replaced with Marina Regler. A year later, Regler left and was replaced with Benjamin Metzner. All three had taken on the stage name "Hodenherz", with Metzner currently referred to as "Hodenherz III" or "Hodi."

In June 2007, their second studio album Met und Miezen was released.

In 2008, guitarist Hans Platz joined the band.

In April 2009, Linke left the band, leaving Henrici as the only founding member still in Feuerschwanz.

On 18 September 2009, their third studio album Metvernichter was released.

On 18 March 2011, their fourth studio album Wunsch ist Wunsch was released.

On 31 August 2012, their fifth studio album Walhalligalli was released.

=== 2014–2018: Tenth anniversary and rise in popularity ===
On 25 April 2014, the band performed their tenth anniversary concert at E-Werk in Erlangen. During the performance, Henrici announced Schindler's departure and that Felix Fischer would take his place. The band was joined by musician Thomas Lindner on stage. The live concert recording was released on 27 May 2015.

On 19 September 2014, their sixth studio album Auf's Leben was released.

On 21 May 2015, Feuerschwanz was removed from the list of bands performing at Fairytale Festival at Osnabrück University and replaced with Reliquiae for the festival's lineup. This was in response to planned protests by the student body against the band's appearance due to perceived misogynistic and sexist content in the setlist. In response, the band expressed their disappointment and emphasized the satirical nature of their music.

On 19 August 2016, their seventh studio album Sex is Muss was released. This became one of their most popular albums to date, breaking into the Top 100 Album-Charts on the official German music charts at number 7.

On 17 August 2018, their eighth studio album Methämmer was released. It reached number 6 on the official German music charts.

=== 2019–present: Signing with Napalm Records, Memento Mori, and Fegefeuer ===
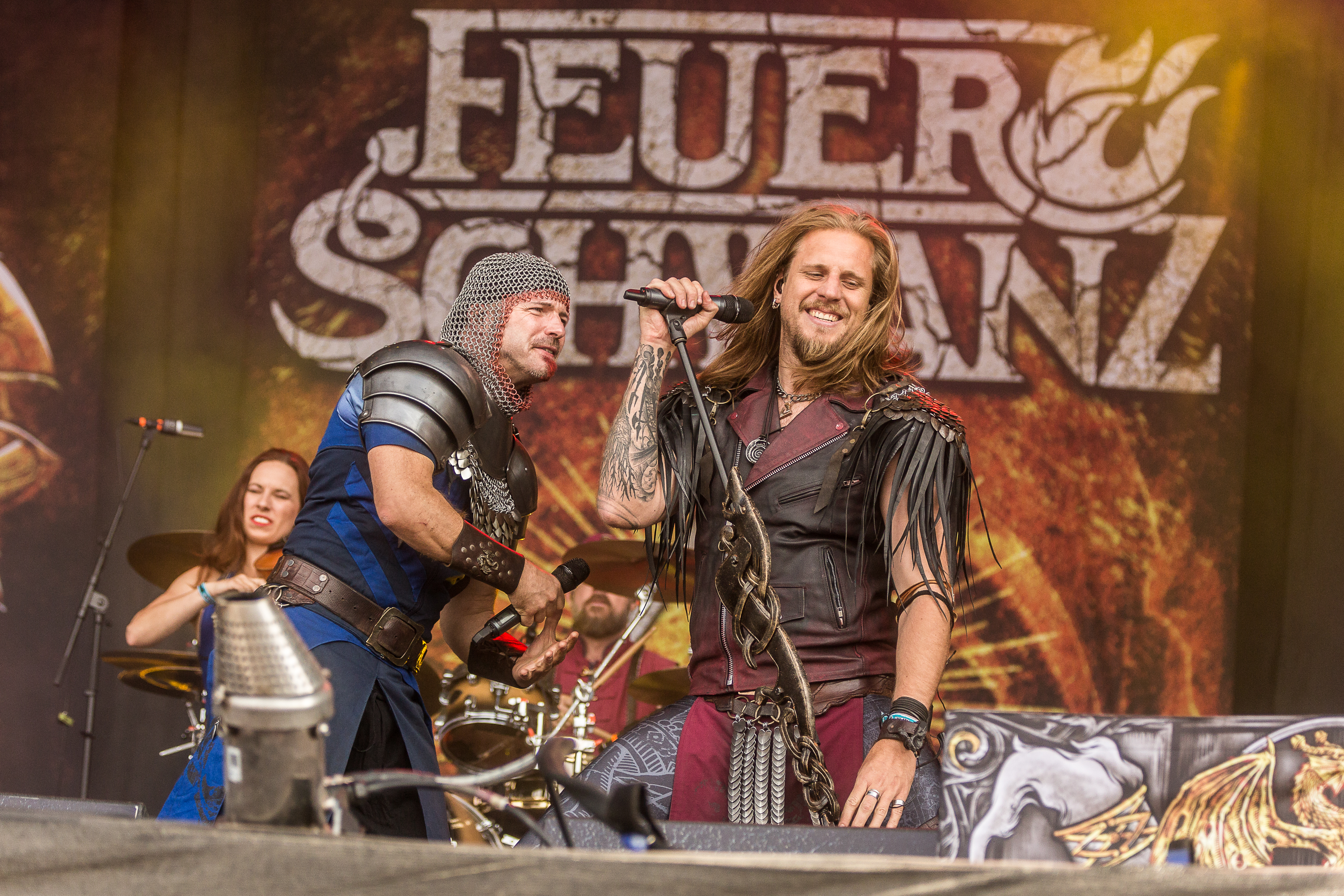
Feuerschwanz at Rockharz Open Air 2019

In June 2019, the band signed a record deal with Napalm Records.

On 26 June 2020, their ninth studio album Das Elfte Gebot was released. This was the first album to also be released as a vinyl record. That same day, the band hosted an outdoor concert called 11:O:A at Abenberg Castle; however, due to COVID-19 restrictions in Germany at the time, there were no physical attendees and the concert was streamed live on Napalm Record's official YouTube channel.

On 9 June 2021, Feuerschwanz announced on Facebook that longtime drummer Sir Lanzeflott (Gruss) would be leaving after sixteen years. The band had no immediate successor to replace him, and the drums would be played by various guest musicians at their upcoming concerts while they looked for a replacement.

On 14 August 2021, the band Megaherz announced on Facebook the departure of their drummer Rolf Hering and revealing that he was the new drummer for Feuerschwanz. Feuerschwanz officially confirmed this on 10 September 2021.

On 30 December 2021, their tenth studio album Memento Mori was released. The band's producer Simon Michael stepped in on the drums, as the position was still vacant at the time of recording. The album reached number one on the official German charts on 7 January 2022.

On 21 July 2023, their eleventh studio album Fegefeuer was released. On 28 July 2023, the album reached number one on the official German charts.

On 4 February 2025, Feuerschwanz were announced as one of the acts in Germany's national selection for Eurovision 2025.

On 22 August 2025, band has released the official video for their new single "Valhalla", featuring Doro Pesch.

== Musical style ==
The band has described their early albums as "medieval folk comedy", which were often paired with brash language, humorous lyrics, and innuendo.

In 2020, after signing on with Napalm Records and ahead of the release of Das elfte Gebot, Feuerschwanz shifted from comedic medieval folk rock towards a more serious heavy metal style.

Henrici noted the disconnect between the comedic nature of their music and a German audience, especially with the band's earlier works, and said that it was "shocking" for Germans to hear humor in a song.

Originally, Myu and Musch-Musch were called "Miezen" (German for "kitties") and wore feline accessories with their costumes. In January 2025, the band announced on Instagram that the "Miezen" are now shield-maidens to modernize the image of the performers.

== Members ==
=== Current ===
- Hauptmann Feuerschwanz (Henrici) – vocals, guitar, lute (2003–present)
- Prinz R. Hodenherz "Hodi" III (Metzner) – vocals, guitar, flute, mandolin, Irish bouzouki, bagpipes, various whistles (2007–present)
- Johanna von der Vögelweide (Pracht) – violin, hurdy-gurdy (2005–present)
- Hans the Upright (Platz) – electric guitar (2008–present)
- Rollo H. Schönhaar (Hering) – drums (2021–present)
- Jarne Hodinsson (Jamaszyk) – bass (2018–present)
- Schildmaid Yennefer (formerly Mieze Myu) (Diehl) – performer, harp (2012–present)
- Schildmaid Hela (formerly Mieze Musch-Musch) – performer (2006–present)

=== Former ===
- Eysye (Linke) – bass (2003–2009)
- Walther von der Vögelweide (Heindl) – violin (2003–2005)
- Sir Lanzeflott (Gruss) – drums (2005–2021)
- Richard Hodenherz I (Brenner) – flute, guitar (2004–2007)
- Der Knappe (Schindler) – percussion, bass, vocals (2004–2014)
- Felix Taugenix (Fischer) – bass (2014–2018)
- Ronja Hodenherz (Regler) – flute, guitar (2006–2007)

== Discography ==
- Prima Nocte (2005)
- Met und Miezen (2007)
- Metvernichter (2009)
- Wunsch ist Wunsch (2011)
- Walhalligalli (2012)
- Auf's Leben! (2014)
- Sex is Muss (2016)
- Methämmer (2018)
- Das elfte Gebot (2020)
- Memento Mori (2021)
- Todsünden (2022)
- Fegefeuer (2023)
- Warriors (2024)
- Knightclub (2025)
