= Melissa Bonny =

Swiss singer

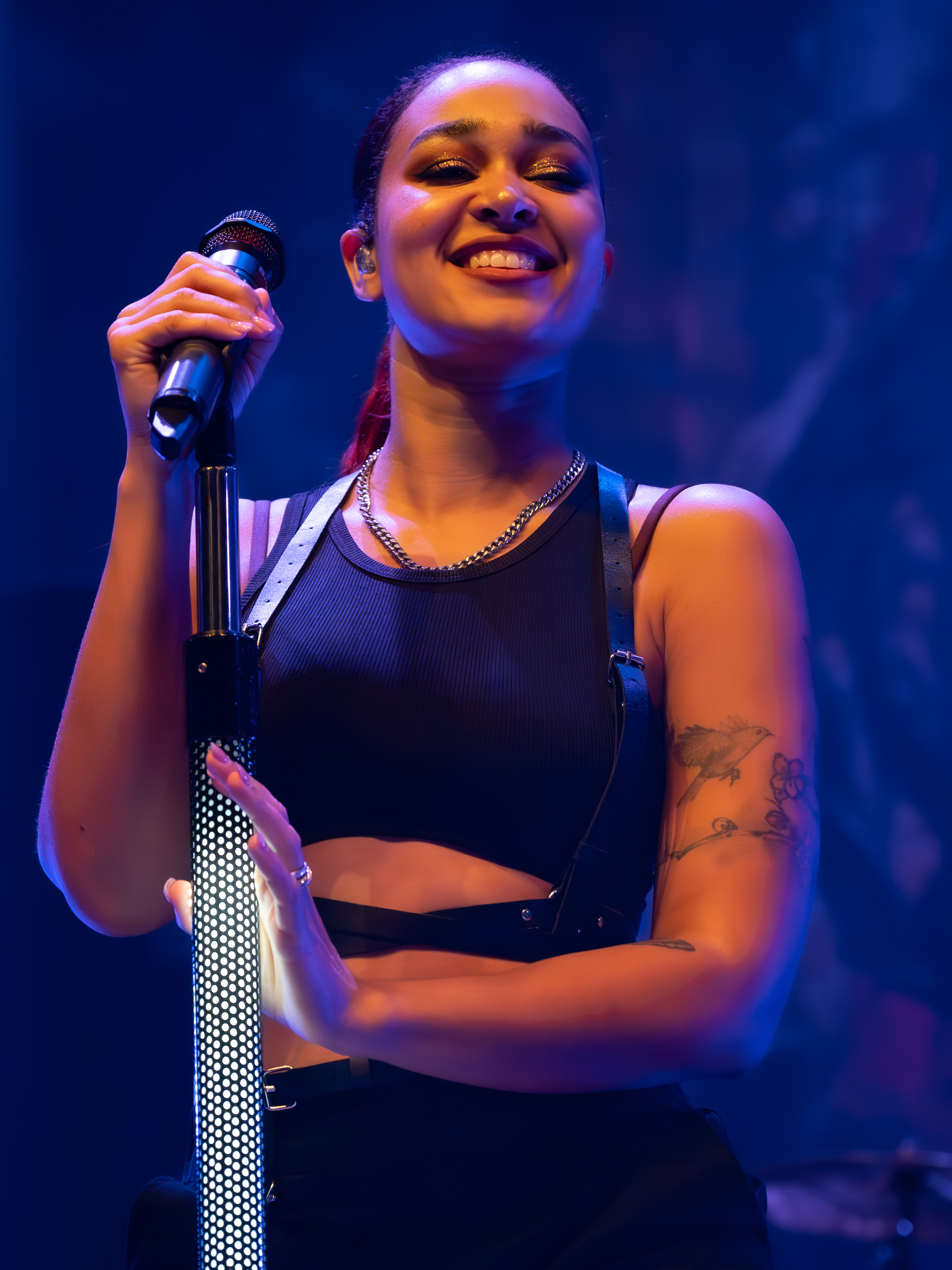
- Bonny with Ad Infinitum in 2024

Background information
- Born: January 23, 1993 (age 33); Montreux, Vaud, Switzerland
- Genres: Symphonic metal; melodic death metal; power metal; trance metal; folk metal
- Occupations: Singer; songwriter
- Years active: 2012–present
- Member of: Ad Infinitum; The Dark Side of the Moon
- Formerly of: Evenmore; Rage of Light
- Website: melissabonny.com

Melissa Bonny (born 23 January 1993) is a Swiss singer, best known for being the founder and vocalist of the symphonic metal band Ad Infinitum. She is also the vocalist of The Dark Side of the Moon and former vocalist of Evenmore and Rage of Light. She also gained some popularity by recording music as well as touring with various bands such as Kamelot, Feuerschwanz, Rock Meets Classic and more.

Bonny possesses a mezzo-soprano voice. She also masters guttural singing, to which she switches within songs.

== Career ==
After graduating from school, Bonny was active in a cover band in the area around her hometown. She left in 2012 to join the symphonic folk metal band Evenmore as a singer.

=== Evenmore (2012–2018) ===
In 2012, Bonny joined the symphonic folk metal band Evenmore. She released one EP and one studio album with them. After the band went on their first European tour which followed the release of their debut album, the band became dormant and Bonny officially left in 2018.

=== Rage of Light (2015–2021) ===
Bonny joined the then-studio project of Jonathan Pellet as the lead vocalist. The project became a touring band after signing a deal with Austrian label Napalm Records. Bonny recorded one EP and one studio album as the lead vocalist of the band. In 2021, Bonny and Rage of Light parted ways amicably. They announced that the different schedules within the band could not align and that the decision was made to best serve everyone's careers.

=== Ad Infinitum (2018–present) ===
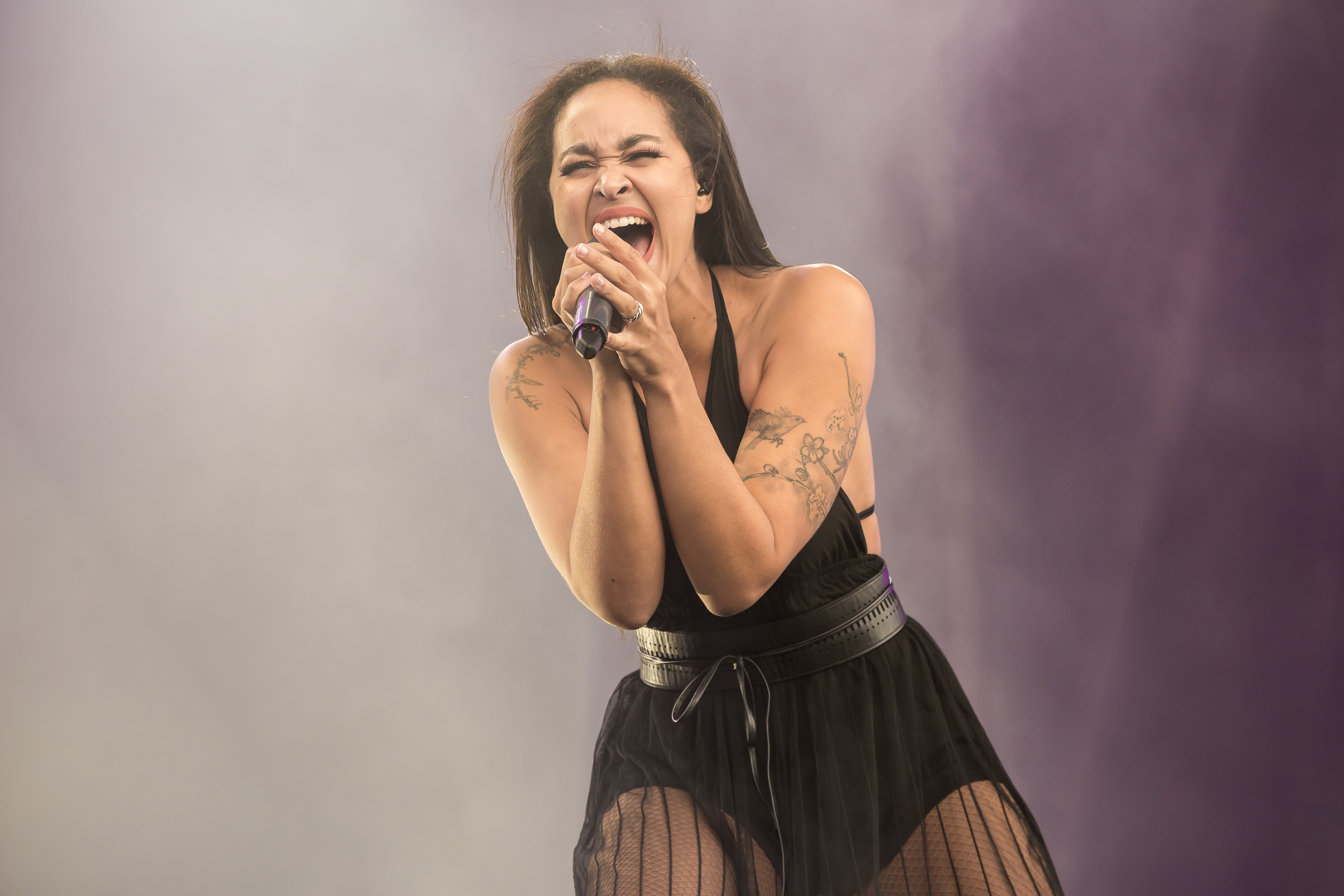
Bonny with Ad Infinitum in 2022

In 2018, Bonny formed Ad Infinitum and released the band's debut single "I Am The Storm". She was joined later on by drummer Nicklas Müller, bassist Jonas Asplind later replaced by Korbinian Benedict and guitarist Adrian Thessevitz. In addition to singing, she also writes lyrics and composes songs for the band.

On April 3, 2020, Ad Infinitum released their debut album Chapter I: Monarchy. This album was followed by its acoustic version "Chapter I Revisited" released the same year. They also released music videos for the songs "Marching on Versailles", "See You In Hell", "Live Before You Die", "Demons (acoustic)" and "Marching on Versailles (acoustic)". Ad Infinitum also released a recorded concert on YouTube to celebrate the release of the album.

On October 29, 2021, the band released their second studio album Chapter II: Legacy. The band released four music videos for the songs "Unstoppable", "Afterlife", "Animals" and "Inferno" as well as live video recordings of the songs "Your Enemy", "Into The Night" and "Afterlife", taken from their online release show.

On March 31, 2023, the third studio album of the band Chapter III: Downfall was released with official music videos for the songs "Upside Down", "Somewhere Better", "Seth", "From the Ashes" and "Eternal Rain".

On July 25, 2024, the fourth studio album, Abyss, was announced and was later released on 11 October 2024.

=== The Dark Side of the Moon (2021–present) ===
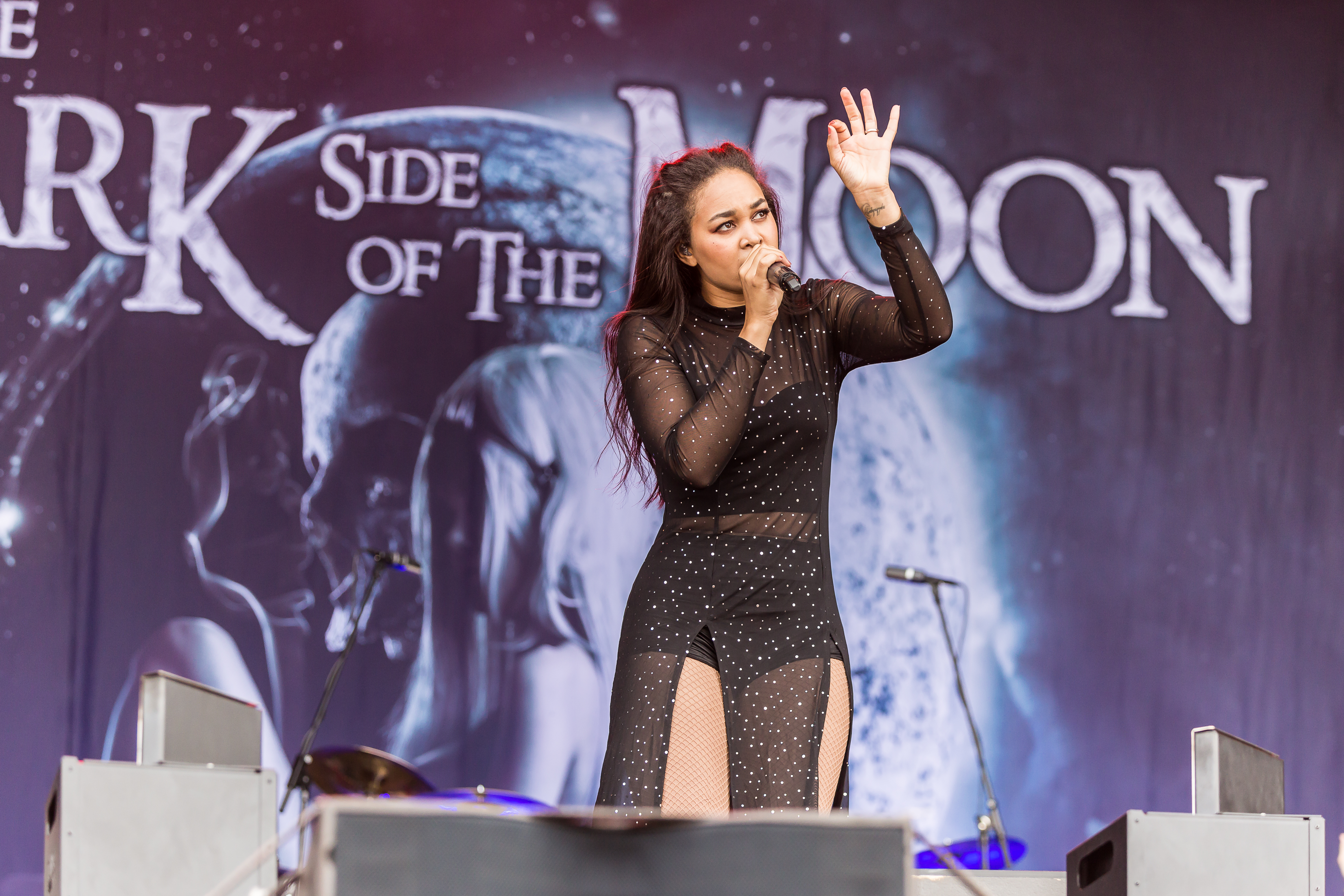
Bonny with The Dark Side of the Moon in 2023

In mid-July 2021, the founding of the band The Dark Side of the Moon was announced. Alongside Bonny on vocals, the group consists of guitarist Hans Platz, harpist Jenny Diehl (both from Feuerschwanz) and drummer Morten Løwe Sørensen from Amaranthe. A record deal was signed with the Austrian record label Napalm Records.

Their debut album "Metamorphosis" was released on May 12, 2023 and features guests musicians Charlotte Wessels, Fabienne Erni (Eluveitie, Illumishade), Rusanda Panfili (Hanz Zimmer Live) and Tom S. Englund (Evergrey).

=== Solo career (2025–present) ===
On 18 August 2025, Bonny announced her solo album, Cherry Red Apocalypse, which was released on 23 January 2026.

=== Other collaborations ===
Since her debut on stage with Evenmore, Bonny gained popularity with both her work with her bands and the many collaborations she did with various artists.

In 2018, she was a guest vocalist for Austrian band Serenity on both their European tours.

In 2019, she joined the band Warkings on stage and in the studio and recorded guest vocals for the band Skeletoon, on their cover of Avantasia's "Farewell".

In 2020, Bonny participated to Rock Meets Classic and shared the stage with rock legends Alice Cooper, Robin Zander (Cheap Trick), Joyce Kennedy (Mother's Finest), Robert Hart (Manfred Mann's Earth Band), Danny Bowes (Thunder) and Lucke Morley (Thunder), as well as the Mat Sinner Band and the RMC Symphony Orchestra. Later the same year, she was featured on Feuerschwanz's cover of "Ding" by Seeed, "Odin's Sons" by Warkings, "Try" by Beneath My Sins and on several tracks of the Malefistum album "Enemy".

In 2021, she recorded vocals for Feuerschwanz again, for their cover of Manowar's Warriors of the World United, alongside Alea der Bescheidene (Saltatio Mortis) and Angus McSix. The same year, she was also featured on track "The Sarlinian Bow" on Marius Danielsen's album "Legend of Valley Doom, Pt. 3".

In 2022, Bonny appeared as a guest singer on Powerwolf's "Missa Cantorem II" on the track "Blood for Blood", on Eklipse's song "Not All Those Who Wander Are Lost", on Mortemia's song "Devastation Bound" and on H.E.R.O.'s song "Monster" from album "Alternate Realities".

She also participated in Eluveitie and Friends' tribute song to Alexi Laiho "Follow the Reaper" alongside Jonas Wolf (Eluveitie), Michalina Malisz (Lyrre), Teemu Mäntysaari (Wintersun, Smackbound), Vili Itäpelto (Smackbound), Rob Van Der Loo (Epica) and Jocke Wallgren (Amon Amarth), also released in 2022.

The same year, she joined Feuerschwanz on the main stage of Wacken Open Air. The show was recorded and the audio was released the year after.

In 2023, she was featured on Kamelot's song "New Babylon" from the album The Awakening as well as the video game "Metal: Hellsinger" on the track "Swallow The Fire". Bonny also appeared on the live recording of Feuerschwanz's Wacken Open Air performance which was released as bonus material for the band's "Fegefeuer" album. She joined Kamelot on stage in 2023 for their South American tour.

== Personal life ==
Bonny spent most of her life in Switzerland. She briefly lived in the area of Dublin, Ireland where she studied English and passed her Cambridge Advanced English exam, and in Madrid for some time, learning Spanish at a language school. Since the end of 2020, Bonny has been living in Denmark with her husband Morten Løwe Sørensen, the drummer of the band Amaranthe.

== Discography ==
Studio albums:

- Cherry Red Apocalypse (2026)

=== Ad Infinitum ===
Studio albums:

- Chapter I: Monarchy (2020)
- Chapter II: Legacy (2021)
- Chapter III: Downfall (2023)
- Abyss (2024)

=== Rage of Light ===
Studio albums:

- Imploder (2019)

EPs:

- Chasing a Reflection (2016)

=== The Dark Side of the Moon ===
Studio albums:

- Metamorphosis (2023)

=== Evenmore ===
Studio albums:

- Last Ride (2016)

EPs:

- The Beginning (2014)
