= Germany in the Eurovision Song Contest 2025 =

- Eurovision Song Contest 2025
- Participating broadcaster: ARD (Note: Arbeitsgemeinschaft der öffentlich-rechtlichen Rundfunkanstalten der Bundesrepublik Deutschland) – Norddeutscher Rundfunk (NDR)
- Country: Germany
- Selection process: Chefsache ESC 2025 – Wer singt für Deutschland?
- Selection date: 1 March 2025

Competing entry
- Song: "Baller"
- Artist: Abor & Tynna
- Songwriters: Alexander Hauer; Attila Bornemisza; Tünde Bornemisza

Placement
- Final result: 15th, 151 points

Participation chronology

Germany was represented at the Eurovision Song Contest 2025 with the song "Baller", written by Alexander Hauer, Attila Bornemisza and Tünde Bornemisza, and performed by the Bornemiszas as Abor & Tynna. The German participating broadcaster on behalf of ARD, Norddeutscher Rundfunk (NDR), organised the national final format Chefsache ESC 2025 – Wer singt für Deutschland? in collaboration with private broadcaster RTL to select its entry.

As a member of the "Big Five", Germany automatically qualified to compete in the final of the Eurovision Song Contest. Performing in position 16, Germany placed 15th out of the 26 performing countries, scoring 151 points.

== Background ==
Prior to the 2025 contest, ARD has participated in the Eurovision Song Contest representing Germany 67 times since its debut at the inaugural contest in 1956, making Germany, to this point, the country with the most entries in the contest; it has taken part in every edition, except in 1996, when it was eliminated in a pre-qualification round. It has won the contest on two occasions: in 1982 with the song "Ein bißchen Frieden" performed by Nicole, and in 2010 with the song "Satellite" performed by Lena. In 2024, "Always on the Run" performed by Isaak placed 12th out of 25 competing songs in the final with 117 points.

As part of its duties as participating broadcaster, ARD organises the selection of its entry in the Eurovision Song Contest and broadcasts the event in the country. ARD confirmed its participation in the 2025 contest on 27 May 2024. Since 1996, ARD has delegated the participation in the contest to its member Norddeutscher Rundfunk (NDR). Since 2022, NDR had set up national finals with several artists to choose both the song and performer to compete in the contest. On 29 October 2024, the broadcaster announced that it would organise a multi-artist national final in collaboration with private broadcaster RTL and Stefan Raab. Raab, a three-time German Eurovision participant (as singer and/or songwriter) and co-presenter of the 2011 contest in Düsseldorf, had previously worked with NDR on its national finals between 2010 and 2012.

== Before Eurovision ==
=== Chefsache ESC 2025 – Wer singt für Deutschland? ===
Chefsache ESC 2025 – Wer singt für Deutschland? ("Top priority ESC 2025 – Who sings for Germany?") was the competition that selected the German entry for the Eurovision Song Contest 2025. The competition took place between 14 February 2025 and 1 March 2025 at the EMG Studio 8 in Hürth, hosted by Barbara Schöneberger, and consisted of two heats, a semi-final and a final. The heats and semi-final were broadcast on RTL and online via RTL+, while the final was broadcast on Das Erste and One as well as online via the ARD Mediathek platform and ARD's Eurovision Song Contest website eurovision.de.

==== Competing artists ====
Interested artists and composers were able to submit their entries for the competition between 6 and 28 November 2024. Artists without their own songs were also able to apply and had to submit an introduction video along with a performance clip of a cover song. By the end of the process, it was announced that 3,281 applications were received, of which 1,198 included an own song. The 24 competing acts were selected by a panel consisting of representatives of Raab Entertainment, ARD and RTL, and announced on 4 February 2025.

Chefsache ESC 2025 – Wer singt für Deutschland? participating artists
- Abor & Tynna
- Adina
- Benjamin Braatz
- Cage
- Chase
- Cloudy June
- Cosby
- Enny-Mae x Paradigm
- Equa Tu
- Fannie
- Feuerschwanz
- From Fall to Spring
- Jaln
- Janine
- Jonathan Henrich
- Julika
- Leonora
- Lyza
- Moss Kena
- Ni-ka
- Noah Levi
- Parallel
- The Great Leslie
- Vincent Varus

==== Heats ====
Two heats took place on 14 and 15 February 2025. In each heat each, twelve artists performed a cover song or their own song (though not their candidate Eurovision song should they progress to the semi-final), and an expert jury selected seven acts to proceed to the semi-final. The jury panel for both shows consisted of producer Stefan Raab, singer and actress Yvonne Catterfeld, and presenter Elton, while 2004 German entrant Max Mutzke and singer-songwriter Johannes Oerding featured as guest jurors in the first and second heat, respectively.

Heat 1 – 14 February 2025
R/O	Artist	Song	Result
1	Julika	"Run"	Advanced
2	Benjamin Braatz	"Breakfast"	Advanced
3	Fannie	"Easy"	Eliminated
4	Chase	"Million Years Ago"	Eliminated
5	Enny-Mae x Paradigm	"Arcade"	Eliminated
6	Jonathan Henrich	"Golden Hour"	Advanced
7	Feuerschwanz	"Dragostea din tei"	Advanced
8	Cage	"Wrong Places"	Advanced
9	Equa Tu	"Gaga"	Eliminated
10	Janine	"Can't Help Falling in Love"	Eliminated
11	Cosby	"Loved for Who I Am"	Advanced
12	Abor & Tynna	"Skyfall"	Advanced

Heat 2 – 15 February 2025
R/O	Artist	Song	Result
1	Adina	"In the Air Tonight"	Eliminated
2	Jaln	"Lose Control"	Advanced
3	Leonora	"Good Day"	Advanced
4	Ni-ka	"The Way You Make Me Feel"	Eliminated
5	From Fall to Spring	"Control"	Advanced
6	Noah Levi	"There's Nothing Holdin' Me Back"	Eliminated
7	Cloudy June	"Sad Girl Era"	Advanced
8	Parallel	"Noi"	Eliminated
9	Moss Kena	"Die with a Smile"	Advanced
10	Vincent Varus	"Coffee"	Eliminated
11	The Great Leslie	"Fix You"	Advanced
12	Lyza	"Voilà"	Advanced

==== Semi-final ====
The semi-final took place on 22 February 2025. Each of the remaining fourteen artists performed their candidate Eurovision song and an expert jury selected nine acts to proceed to the final. The jury panel consisted of Raab, Catterfeld and Elton, as well as singer-songwriter Max Giesinger.

Semi-final – 22 February 2025
R/O	Artist	Song	Songwriter(s)	Result
1	Feuerschwanz	"Knightclub"	Ben Metzner; Dag-Alexis Kopplin; Hans Platz; Peter Henrici	Advanced
2	Benjamin Braatz	"Like You Love Me"	Benjamin Braatz	Advanced
3	Cloudy June	"If Jesus Saw What We Did Last Night"	Amanda Cy; Claudi Terry Verdecia; Maarten Paul	Eliminated
4	Cosby	"I'm Still Here"	Kilian Reischl; Marie Kobylka; Robin Karow	Advanced
5	Jaln	"Weg von dir"	Marc Rohles; Worthington Jalen Davis	Eliminated
6	From Fall to Spring	"Take the Pain Away"	Benedikt Veith; León Arend; Lukas Wilhelm; Philip Wilhelm; Sebastian Monzel; Simon Triem	Eliminated
7	Jonathan Henrich	"Golden Child"	Jonathan Henrich	Eliminated
8	Abor & Tynna	"Baller"	Alexander Hauer; Attila Bornemisza; Tünde Bornemisza	Advanced
9	Leonora	"This Bliss"	Leonora Margarethe Huth; Jan Klinkenberg; Anikó Kanthak	Advanced
10	Julika	"Empress"	Julika Lüer	Advanced
11	Lyza	"Lovers on Mars"	Anderz Wrethov; Julie Aagaard; Thomas Stengaard; Vasilisa Subotic	Advanced
12	Moss Kena	"Nothing Can Stop Love"	Hitimpulse; Martin Gallop; Matthew Thomas Paul Holmes; Philip Anthony Leigh; Thomas McKenna	Advanced
13	The Great Leslie	"These Days"	Alfie Pawsey; Freddie Miles; Oliver Trevers; Ryan Lavender	Advanced
14	Cage	"Golden Hour"	Karolin Gärtner; Orkun Akcil	Eliminated

==== Final ====
The final took place on 1 March 2025. The winner was selected through two rounds of voting. In the first round of voting, each of the remaining nine artists performed their candidate Eurovision song and a cover song, and an expert jury will selected five acts to proceed to the second round. In the second round, the winner was selected solely through public voting with options for landline, SMS and online voting. The jury panel that voted in the first round consisted of Raab, Catterfeld, 2014 Austrian entrant and winner Conchita Wurst, and singer-songwriter Nico Santos.

Final – 1 March 2025
R/O	Artist	Song	Cover	Result
1	The Great Leslie	"These Days"	"Waterloo"	Advanced
2	Benjamin Braatz	"Like You Love Me"	"Angels"	Eliminated
3	Leonora	"This Bliss"	"Houdini"	Advanced
4	Feuerschwanz	"Knightclub"	"I See Fire"	Eliminated
5	Moss Kena	"Nothing Can Stop Love"	"Levitating"	Advanced
6	Abor & Tynna	"Baller"	"Bang Bang (My Baby Shot Me Down)"	Advanced
7	Cosby	"I'm Still Here"	"I Wanna Dance with Somebody (Who Loves Me)"	Eliminated
8	Lyza	"Lovers on Mars"	"Creep"	Advanced
9	Julika	"Empress"	"Euphoria"	Eliminated

Superfinal – 1 March 2025
Artist	Song	Public vote				Place
Artist	Song	Phone	SMS	Online	Total	Place
Abor & Tynna	"Baller"	142,656	82,688	6,302	231,646	1
Leonora	"This Bliss"	31,130	14,230	715	46,075	4
Lyza	"Lovers on Mars"	150,758	52,848	2,486	206,092	2
Moss Kena	"Nothing Can Stop Love"	110,071	37,821	1,847	149,739	3
The Great Leslie	"These Days"	18,962	10,058	816	29,836	5

==== Ratings ====
Viewing figures by show
Show	Air date	Viewers (millions)	Share (%)	Ref.
Heat 1	14 February 2025	2.14	9.2%	
Heat 2	15 February 2025	1.79	7.7%	
Semi-final	22 February 2025	1.81	8.5%	
Final	1 March 2025	3.69	16.8%	

== At Eurovision ==
=== Voting ===
==== Points awarded to Germany ====
Points awarded to Germany (Final)
Score	Televote	Jury
12 points	Austria	Czechia; Ukraine
10 points		Israel; Serbia
8 points	Lithuania	Italy
7 points		
6 points		
5 points	Armenia; Finland; Israel; Latvia; Poland; Serbia; Ukraine	Greece; Lithuania
4 points	Albania	Luxembourg
3 points	Croatia; Estonia; Greece	Spain
2 points	Georgia	Azerbaijan; Georgia; Latvia
1 point	Czechia; Denmark; Iceland; Netherlands	Belgium; Finland

==== Points awarded by Germany ====
Points awarded by Germany (Semi-final 2)
Score	Televote
12 points	Israel
10 points	Greece
8 points	Latvia
7 points	Lithuania
6 points	Finland
5 points	Austria
4 points	Denmark
3 points	Luxembourg
2 points	Australia
1 point	Serbia

Points awarded by Germany (Final)
Score	Televote	Jury
12 points	Israel	Austria
10 points	Greece	France
8 points	Albania	Malta
7 points	Poland	Switzerland
6 points	Austria	Greece
5 points	Sweden	Italy
4 points	Estonia	Sweden
3 points	Ukraine	Israel
2 points	Italy	Poland
1 point	Iceland	Norway

==== Detailed voting results ====
Each participating broadcaster assembles a five-member jury panel consisting of music industry professionals who are citizens of the country they represent. Each jury, and individual jury member, is required to meet a strict set of criteria regarding professional background, as well as diversity in gender and age. No member of a national jury was permitted to be related in any way to any of the competing acts in such a way that they cannot vote impartially and independently. The individual rankings of each jury member as well as the nation's televoting results were released shortly after the grand final.

The following members comprised the German jury:

- Alexander Zuckowski
- Eko Fresh
- Marc Möllmann
- Carolin Fortenbacher
- Vasilisa Subotić

Detailed voting results from Germany (Semi-final 2)
R/O	Country	Televote	
R/O	Country	Rank	Points
01	Australia	9	2
02	Montenegro	16	
03	Ireland	14	
04	Latvia	3	8
05	Armenia	13	
06	Austria	6	5
07	Greece	2	10
08	Lithuania	4	7
09	Malta	12	
10	Georgia	15	
11	Denmark	7	4
12	Czechia	11	
13	Luxembourg	8	3
14	Israel	1	12
15	Serbia	10	1
16	Finland	5	6

Detailed voting results from Germany (Final)
R/O	Country	Jury							Televote	
R/O	Country	Juror A	Juror B	Juror C	Juror D	Juror E	Rank	Points	Rank	Points
01	Norway	13	9	22	6	5	10	1	20	
02	Luxembourg	6	8	6	25	21	14		17	
03	Estonia	8	20	9	19	7	15		7	4
04	Israel	16	11	7	14	3	8	3	1	12
05	Lithuania	18	10	18	16	25	20		13	
06	Spain	19	15	17	11	17	19		19	
07	Ukraine	15	21	16	24	23	24		8	3
08	United Kingdom	5	16	10	9	9	11		22	
09	Austria	10	2	8	1	4	1	12	5	6
10	Iceland	25	25	24	22	22	25		10	1
11	Latvia	21	7	21	23	14	17		14	
12	Netherlands	11	4	15	15	8	13		11	
13	Finland	12	22	12	3	10	12		12	
14	Italy	2	14	3	7	20	6	5	9	2
15	Poland	24	3	23	5	15	9	2	4	7
16	Germany									
17	Greece	17	6	14	4	1	5	6	2	10
18	Armenia	7	24	11	12	16	16		18	
19	Switzerland	1	13	1	18	6	4	7	15	
20	Malta	4	1	2	13	11	3	8	24	
21	Portugal	23	17	13	21	19	22		23	
22	Denmark	20	12	20	17	12	18		21	
23	Sweden	9	23	4	2	13	7	4	6	5
24	France	3	5	5	8	2	2	10	16	
25	San Marino	14	19	19	20	24	23		25	
26	Albania	22	18	25	10	18	21		3	8
