= Metal: Hellsinger =

2022 video game

- Developer: The Outsiders
- Publisher: Funcom
- Designer: Milla Isaksson
- Programmer: Mikael Degerfält
- Artist: Said Zamzad
- Writers: David Goldfarb; Cash Decuir
- Composer: Two Feathers
- Engine: Unity
- Platforms: Microsoft Windows; PlayStation 5 Xbox Series X/S; PlayStation 4 Xbox One
- Release: PC, PS5, Xbox Series X/S; September 15, 2022; PS4, Xbox One; December 8, 2022
- Genres: Rhythm, first-person shooter
- Mode: Single-player

Metal: Hellsinger is a rhythmic first-person shooter video game developed by Swedish developer The Outsiders for Microsoft Windows, PlayStation 5, PlayStation 4, Xbox One, and Xbox Series X/S. It is published by Funcom and was released on September 15, 2022.

Metal: Hellsinger received positive reviews from critics. It was nominated for the British Academy Games Award for Audio Achievement at the 19th British Academy Games Awards.

== Gameplay ==
The game mixes elements from both first person shooters and rhythm games, drawing particular reference from the rebooted Doom franchise. While navigating the demonic game world, players are faced by an array of demons and accompanied by a heavy metal score. Players deal extra damage if their attacks are synchronised to the beat of the music, with additional instruments joining the song as the fury meter increases. This meter can also be maintained by performing other actions, such as dashing and reloading, to the beat. This beat is also represented in environmental elements, such as fire animations, in what the game calls the "natural rhythm of the universe". Additional challenge levels named Torments can be beaten to unlock power-ups.

The game also draws on elements of the bullet hell genre, with large numbers of projectiles in the battlefield in some fights. Players have a high level of manoeuvrability, being able to double jump and dash forwards in mid-air as in Doom Eternal, and manoeuvring is key in those bullet hell segments. The game is divided across nine layers of hell (including the tutorial), each of which culminates in a boss fight against an aspect of 'The Judge', the game's antagonist.

== Plot ==
A lost soul named simply "The Unknown" arrives in Hell, whereupon her memories, her voice, and her "song" are stolen, as Hell steals the memories of all who reside there, sometimes leaving just enough to make inhabitants suffer. Seeking to reclaim it, she goes to face the ruler of hell, The Red Judge, but was locked away behind an unbreakable Anguish Gate below the Hells. However, she is called upon and finds Paz, a talking skull who acts as the game's narrator, and whose power, his "pulse" that is the "rhythm of the universe", is something Unknown can harness as her own "song" to break through Anguish Gates and ascend through the Hells back to the Red Judge to reclaim her voice.

Heading to the first Hell, Voke, Unknown and Paz fight their way through the demons and kill an Aspect of the Judge, weakening the Red Judge's power while restoring a portion of Unknown's voice and Paz' memories. Discovering Paz's survival after believing him destroyed, the Red Judge sends the armies of hell to stop The Unknown and her other Aspects to guard the other Hells. As Unknown heads to the second Hell, Stygia, and kills another Aspect, the Red Judge, after researching the Unknown, finds a prophecy that states that the Hells will fall when an Archangel is slain at the Infernal Throne by a Hellsinger. Determined to prevent Hell's prophesied doom, the Red Judge attempts the "Ritual of Spears" to bind Unknown to her will after she battles through the third hell, Yhelm, but Unknown resists it, causing the Red Judge to slowly become panicked as Unknown reaches the fourth Hell, Incaustis, and defeats another Aspect, convincing the demons that Unknown is the Hellsinger.

Desperate to safeguard the Hells as per her orders, the Red Judge calls upon "the All" to send angels from Heaven to aid against the Unknown, which is agreed upon due to the chaos the Unknown is causing in Hell. Fighting through both demons and angels at the fifth Hell, Gehenna, and defeating another Aspect, Paz regains enough memories to remember that it was the Red Judge herself that personally took Unknown's voice, to take her music for herself and prevent Unknown's rise as Hellsinger. Despite this memory, Paz believes something is off about what the Red Judge did and that there was something missing to the memory. Noting that the angels also fear the prophecy, the Red Judge acquires their aid in subjecting herself to "Dissolution", causing the laws and reality of the sixth Hell, Nihil, to start breaking down, at the cost of weakening the Red Judge more. Despite the efforts of Hell's army and the next Aspect to keep the Unknown within Nihil while it is being destroyed and make her lost to time and space, the Unknown is again victorious and escapes, making the Dissolution for nothing.

Despite knowing it will greatly weaken her further due to the two's bond, the Red Judge is given little choice and calls upon the All to cast the "Dispossession" curse, causing Paz to be taken from Unknown just as she's entering the seventh Hell, Acheron. At this point, Paz has recovered enough of his memories from the Aspects to remember that he was once an Archangel and the "Instrument of the All", where his role was "to See and Hear and Give Voice in Praise". Paz found such a life boring and hated the songs he had to sing, except for one song; the Unknown's, which could change everything. To meet her and play the song that he loved, he got himself cast down to Hell, waiting an eternity for her to arrive until his body decayed into only a skull. Now in her possession, the Red Judge plans to extract all of Paz' memories to discover the truth. Left to fight through Acheron by herself, she recovers Paz from the next Aspect, though he regretfully informs her that he told the Red Judge everything. As the angels try to kill the Red Judge for failing to protect Hell from Unknown, the Red Judge kills them before revealing that she now remembers that she was also once an Archangel. She now realises Heaven didn't send angels to Hell to aid her, but sent them out of fear, for they believe that the prophecy will come true, the Red Judge will be killed, and the Unknown will rise as Hellsinger and assault Heaven next. Casting a spell of "Death", the Red Judge absorbs all the damned souls and many demons of the Hells in order to empower herself for the final battle against Unknown.

The Unknown reaches the eighth Hell, Sheol, which acts as bulwark separating Heaven and Hell and is where the Red Judge rules over the other Hells from her throne. Fighting her way to the Red Judge, the two do battle before the latter is defeated. While dying, the Red Judge reveals that she only has part of Unknown's voice; the rest of it resides in the Heavens. The Red Judge also explains the truth: she and a few others believed that the All had become absolutely corrupted and needed to be deposed. When Pazelius (Paz's real name) saw Unknown, he and the Red Judge both conspired to hide Unknown in Hell, knowing that Hell would take both of their memories and hide their plan even from themselves. Paz and her rebelled against the light, leading them to be cast down to Hell, where she was appointed as the Red Judge and ruler of the Hells. When the Red Judge took Unknown's voice, she gave part of it to an angel that was present to take to Heaven, knowing that Unknown would have to defeat the Red Judge to assault Heaven and reclaim her voice, while the Hells made them forget everything; the Red Judge's plan for rebellion, the Unknown's "song", and Pazelius' love for Unknown. With Unknown finally becoming the Hellsinger, and having recovered enough of her voice to shatter the barrier between Heaven and Hell, the Red Judge makes a last request for Unknown to give them Hell before finally dying. Together with Paz, she uses her song to break open a way to Heaven, where the two will go to fight against the All and reclaim the last of her voice.

The game leaves on a cliffhanger in the post-credits cutscene, where it's explained that the Red Judge's death caused the realms to fall apart, allowing demons to escape the Hells and take over spots in "the Prime" (Earth). Paz explains that he and Unknown got separated a long time ago, and that Paz has been searching for her. Assuming a human form, he waits for her to find him on Earth while "all of existence spirals down the drain." In a dive bar where he's residing, he turns to see Unknown in human form enter the building.

More of the story is revealed in the Purgatory update. In it, Paz explains that after killing the Red Judge, he and Unknown did not go to Heaven yet and instead became trapped within a beast called "the Leviathan". With fragments and pieces of Hell having fallen into the Leviathan after the Red Judge's death, Unknown and Paz have to fight through waves of demons and angels in order to collect "Void Echoes", which when given to the Altar of Echoes allows Unknown to discover more of her memories and her power, in order to strengthen the weakened Unknown for the coming fight against the All. They soon discover that the Altar, when fed enough power, can open up a gateway to escape. They also discover that Paz had been to the Leviathan before and left writings on the Altar: they state the Leviathan is the true boundary between Heaven and Hell, along with a message to his future self telling him to give up hope. As the two fight through Leviathan and accumulate power, Paz, although determined to help Unknown escape the Leviathan, begins to fear what will happen to him once Unknown no longer needs him. After coming close to escaping, Paz and Unknown encounter a second, "Lost Unknown" who can speak. She explains that, after the two had killed the Red Judge, they had released "echoes of reality" that the All never meant to exist, with the Lost Unknown being one of those echoes, having been broken off from the original Unknown when she broke Hell's barrier and ended up in the Leviathan. Declaring her intent to storm Heaven alone without the original, the two Unknowns do battle, with the original Unknown killing the Lost Unknown. Though victorious, both Paz and Unknown remained too weakened to escape together, so Paz decides to stay behind to open the portal to let Unknown escape. Unknown, having regained the ability to speak, calls Paz by his real name, Pazelius, and tells him that it was not his fault, then assures him that his voice is still her voice before leaving through the portal. Exhausted, Paz falls to the ground, but is then picked up by an arm from off-screen that looks like Unknown's. Leaving on a cliffhanger, Paz narrates that the audience will just have to trust him that they made it to Heaven, and teases that one day he might tell the story of how, but not today.

== Development ==
Development began in the wake of the cancellation of The Outsiders' previous game, Darkborn. The team decided to use their own music, rather than existing metal, out of both budgetary restraints and the technical need to split the music into layers for the fury meter system. The game was announced in June 2020, initially billed for a 2021 launch, but was delayed to 2022 "in order to meet the high expectations for the game".

In October 2025, it was announced that The Outsiders was being shut down by its parent company Funcom. David Goldfarb, the studio's founder and creative director announced the closure.

== Soundtrack ==
All compositions are by Two Feathers, with each song featuring a guest vocalist. Alongside the release of the Dream of the Beast DLC, the player can choose any song from the soundtrack during gameplay and bosses for each of the eight levels, known as "Hells", respectively. Furthermore, the Essential Hits DLC contains eight licensed songs consisting of different genres, which can be played during gameplay and/or boss, just like the game's soundtrack, but doesn't use the game's multiplier system. The game also supports mods that players can use any song from any genre, which can allow the option to create different music tracks for each multiplier, up to 16x multiplier. In a collaboration, an addition to the soundtrack of Metal: Hellsinger was made in conjunction with the game DUSK. Nine tracks from the original Soundtrack, composed by Andrew Hulshult, were added into the game. In game, the tracks from DUSK are listed together with the tracks from "Essential Hits DLC" and also don't use the multiplier system.

Metal: Hellsinger Original Soundtrack
No.	Title	Lead Vocals	Length
1.	"The Hellsinger (Main Theme)"	none	3:16
2.	"Through You"	Mikael Stanne from Dark Tranquillity	2:37
3.	"This is the End"	Mikael Stanne from Dark Tranquillity	5:29
4.	"Blood and Law"	Mikael Stanne from Dark Tranquillity	6:15
5.	"Stygia"	Alissa White-Gluz from Arch Enemy	5:43
6.	"Infernal Invocation I: Hopes and Fears"	Mikael Stanne from Dark Tranquillity	1:35
7.	"Burial at Night"	Tatiana Shmailyuk from Jinjer	5:38
8.	"Infernal Invocation II: Defiance"	Mikael Stanne from Dark Tranquillity	1:36
9.	"This Devastation"	Matt Heafy from Trivium	5:41
10.	"Infernal Invocation III: Dreaming in Distortion"	Mikael Stanne from Dark Tranquillity	1:58
11.	"Poetry of Cinder"	James Dorton from Black Crown Initiate	4:53
12.	"Dissolution"	Björn "Speed" Strid from Soilwork	5:37
13.	"Acheron"	Randy Blythe from Lamb of God	4:39
14.	"Silent No More"	Dennis Lyxzén from Refused and INVSN	6:36
15.	"No Tomorrow"	Serj Tankian from System of a Down	6:58
Total length:			68:31

Dream of the Beast DLC
No.	Title	Lead Vocals	Length
1.	"Leviathan"	Will Ramos from Lorna Shore	6:19
2.	"Dream of the Beast"	Cristina Scabbia from Lacuna Coil	6:24
Total length:			12:43

Essential Hits DLC
No.	Title	Performer	Length
1.	"Down with the Sickness"	Disturbed	4:38
2.	"Uprising"	Muse	5:04
3.	"Misery Business"	Paramore	3:18
4.	"Tsunami (Original Mix)"	DVBBS & Borgeous	3:56
5.	"Runaway (U & I)"	Galantis	3:47
6.	"Feel Good Inc."	Gorillaz	3:42
7.	"I Love It"	Icona Pop feat. Charli XCX	2:37
8.	"Personal Jesus"	Depeche Mode	3:44
Total length:			28:09

Purgatory DLC
No.	Title	Lead Vocals	Length
1.	"Swallow the Fire"	Melissa Bonny from Ad Infinitum	5:22
2.	"Mouth of Hell"	Joe Badolato from Fit for an Autopsy	4:48
3.	"Goodbye, My Morning Star"	Matt Heafy from Trivium	5:01
Total length:			15:11

DUSK Original Soundtrack DLC
No.	Title	Length
1.	"Departure to Destruction"	3:54
2.	"Hand Cannon"	5:19
3.	"Burn In Hell"	4:00
4.	"Murder Machine Inc."	3:55
5.	"Endless"	4:17
6.	"Mine Control"	3:07
7.	"Sacrifice"	4:49
8.	"Erebus Reaction"	5:08
9.	"Bleeding Out"	3:45
Total length:		38:14

== Reception ==
Reception

Aggregate score
Aggregator	Score
Metacritic	PC: 79/100; PS5: 78/100; XBXS: 79/100

Review scores
Publication	Score
Eurogamer	Recommended
Game Informer	9/10
GameSpot	8/10
IGN	7/10
Jeuxvideo.com	15/20
PC Gamer (US)	78/100
PC Games (DE)	9/10
PCGamesN	7/10
Shacknews	8/10

Eurogamer was positive about the game, noting that it "feels like an outpouring of emotion, as though the game itself is also a different, more personal kind of gestalt," beyond its references to the genre. IGN's review was more mixed, stating that while the game was good it was very short and the bosses were repetitive, adding "Metal: Hellsinger might not be the greatest demon-slaying shoot 'em up in the world, but it's certainly a stirring tribute". PC Gamer had a similar assessment, adding that it while it was unlikely to impact the genre, it was "a perfectly fine game with lots of replay value, some neat ideas, a good soundtrack and a goofy story."

More than 1 million copies of the game had been sold by December 2022.

=== Accolades ===
Year	Award	Category	Result	Ref
2022	Golden Joystick Awards	Best Audio	Won	
2022	The Game Awards	Best Score and Music	Nominated	
2022	Steam Awards	Best Soundtrack	Nominated	
2023	New York Game Awards	Tin Pan Alley Award for Best Music in a Game	Won	
2023	D.I.C.E. Awards	Outstanding Achievement in Original Music Composition	Nominated	
2023	Game Audio Network Guild Awards	Best Audio Mix	Nominated	
2023	Game Audio Network Guild Awards	Best New Original IP Audio	Nominated	
2023	Game Audio Network Guild Awards	Best Original Soundtrack Album	Nominated	
2023	Game Audio Network Guild Awards	Creative and Technical Achievement in Music	Nominated	
2023	Game Audio Network Guild Awards	Creative and Technical Achievement in Sound Design	Nominated	
2023	23rd Game Developers Choice Awards	Best Audio	Nominated	
2023	19th British Academy Games Awards	Audio Achievement	Nominated	
