= Abor & Tynna =

Austrian musical duo

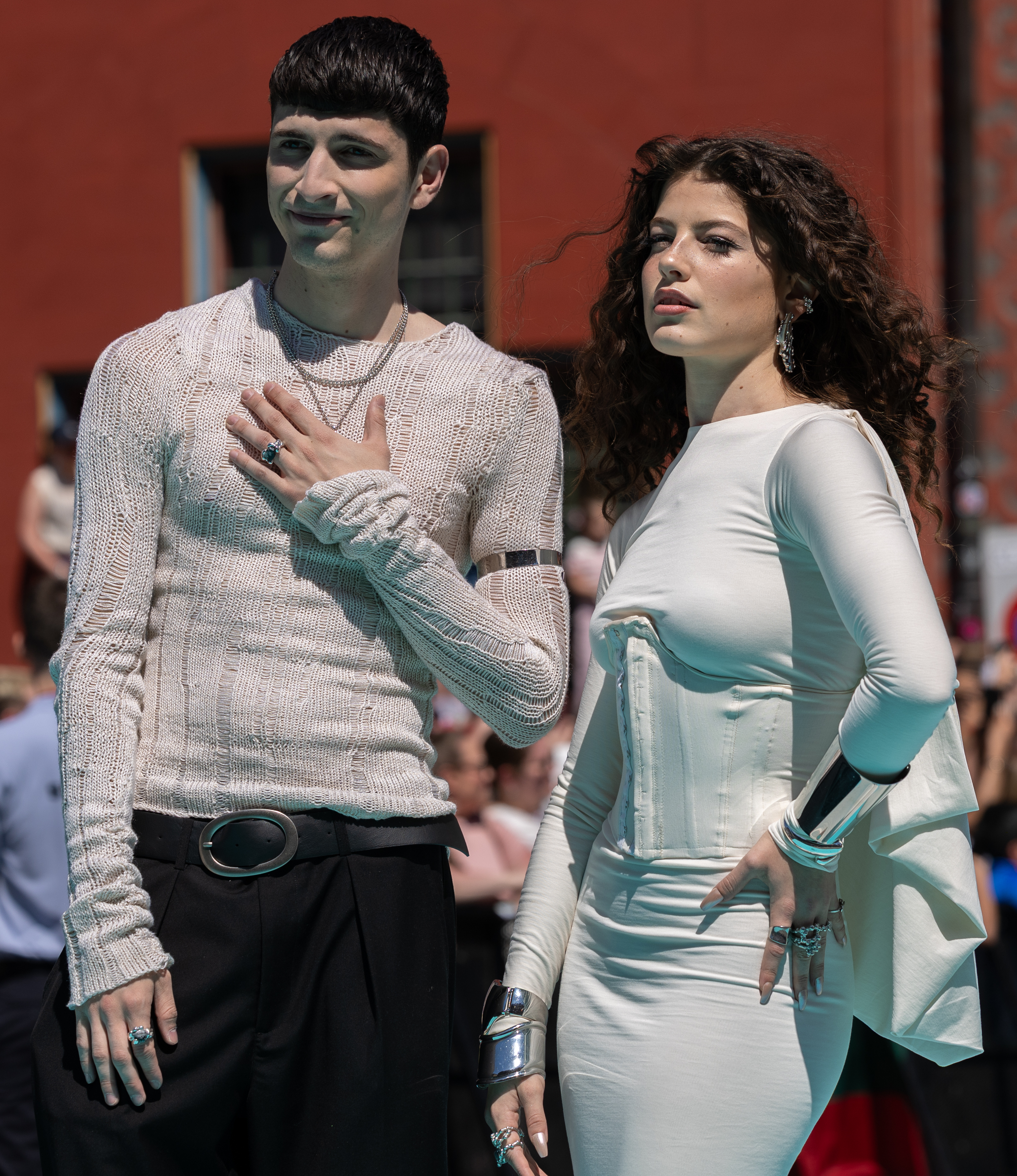
- Abor & Tynna in 2025

Background information
- Origin: Vienna, Austria
- Genres: Pop; hip hop; electronic
- Years active: 2016–present
- Label: Jive Germany
- Members: Attila Bornemisza; Tünde Bornemisza

Abor & Tynna are an Austrian music duo consisting of siblings Attila (born 27 August 1998) and Tünde Bornemisza (born 22 December 2000). They specialise in pop, hip-hop and electronic music. The duo represented Germany in the Eurovision Song Contest 2025 with the song "Baller", where they finished 15th overall with 151 points.

== History ==
The siblings are of Hungarian and Romanian origin and grew up in a family of artists from Hungary. Their father Csaba Bornemisza (born 1966) has been a cellist with the Vienna Philharmonic, the orchestra of the Vienna State Opera, since 1993. All siblings received classical music lessons: Attila trained in cello, Tünde played the flute from the age of nine (she won first prizes in state and national competitions), their younger sister trained in violin. Tünde and Attila studied psychology and mechanical engineering respectively.

=== 2016–2024: First steps ===
In 2016, the siblings recorded their first song together, which they uploaded to SoundCloud. Their mother shared the video on Facebook, whereupon a producer invited them to his recording studio. In the following years, further releases were released, Tünde became the singer and songwriter Tynna, and Attila the music producer took the name Abor. Around 2020, they received an invitation to participate in Austria's internal selection for the Eurovision Song Contest. Due to their inexperience and lack of previous live performances, Abor & Tynna declined. In April 2024, they were the opening act at the opening of Nina Chuba's Glas tour in Bremen.

=== 2025–present: Eurovision Song Contest and Bittersüß ===
At the suggestion of their German music label, Abor & Tynna successfully applied for the German preliminary round of the Eurovision Song Contest 2025. They initially presented themselves in a closed casting in December 2024 with the self-written song "Babylon". From over 3,000 applications, they were ultimately among 24 candidates who faced the vote of a jury and the television audience in the Chefsache ESC 2025 – Wer singt für Deutschland? On the advice of Stefan Raab, the two chose the song "Baller", a short clip of which Raab had discovered on the duo's Instagram profile.

Abor & Tynna received the green light from the jury for the semi-final of the show series with a cover of Adele's Skyfall in the first preliminary round. Their debut album, Bittersüß, was released on the same day. The song, which was included on the album, was voted into the final by the jury and then into the superfinal, where the song won the televoting against four remaining competitors on 1 March 2025, with 34.9% of the votes. Abor & Tynna thus won the right to represent Germany in the grand final of the Eurovision Song Contest in Basel on 17 May 2025, where they finished 15th with 151 points.

== Discography ==
=== Studio albums ===
List of studio albums, with selected details
Title	Details	Peak chart positions					
Title	Details	AUT	GER	LTU	NLD	POL	SWI
Bittersüß	Released: 14 February 2025; Label: Jive Germany; Formats: CD, digital download, streaming	17	10	7	38	73	100

=== Singles ===
Title	Year	Peak chart positions										Certifications	Album
Title	Year	AUT	FIN	GER	LTU	NL	NOR	SWE	SWI	UK	WW	Certifications	Album
"Anti Ally"	2020	—	—	—	—	—	—	—	—	—	—		Non-album singles
"Winx Club"	2022	—	—	—	—	—	—	—	—	—	—		Non-album singles
"Coco Taxi"	2023	—	—	—	—	—	—	—	—	—	—		Bittersüß
"Plattenpräsident"	2024	—	—	—	—	—	—	—	—	—	—		Non-album single
"Küsschen"	2024	—	—	—	—	—	—	—	—	—	—		Bittersüß
"Mama"	2024	—	—	—	—	—	—	—	—	—	—		Bittersüß
"Guess What I Like"	2024	—	—	—	—	—	—	—	—	—	—		Bittersüß
"Seifenblasen"	2024	—	—	—	—	—	—	—	—	—	—		Bittersüß
"Psst"	2024	—	—	—	—	—	—	—	—	—	—		Bittersüß
"Baller"	2025	3	9	3	1	26	37	14	5	34	80	IFPI AUT: Gold; IFPI SWI: Gold	Bittersüß
"—" denotes a recording that did not chart or was not released in that territory.

== Awards and nominations ==
Year	Award	Category	Nominee(s)	Result	Ref.
2025	Eurovision Awards	Certified Banger	Themselves	Won	
2025	1LIVE Krone	Bester Newcomer Act	Themselves	Nominated	

Awards and achievements
Preceded by Isaak with "Always on the Run"	Germany in the Eurovision Song Contest; 2025	Succeeded by Sarah Engels with "Fire"
