= Chapter I: Monarchy =

Studio album by Ad Infinitum
- Released: 3 April 2020
- Genre: Symphonic metal
- Length: 61:27
- Label: Napalm
- Producer: Oliver Philipps

Ad Infinitum chronology
| Chapter I: Monarchy (2020) | Chapter II: Legacy (2021) |

Chapter I: Monarchy is the first studio album by the Swiss symphonic metal band Ad Infinitum, released by Napalm Records on 3 April 2020.

== Reception ==
The album received mostly positive reviews. Tuonela magazine described the album as "a solid debut album from a talented group of musicians that presents a new facet of the symphonic metal formula. It is sleek and melodic, grandiose and mesmerizing, with a polished production that allows everything to shine and have a well-balanced sound to it."

== Track listing ==
| No. | Title | Length |
|---|---|---|
| 1. | "Infected Monarchy" | 5:46 |
| 2. | "Marching on Versailles" | 3:52 |
| 3. | "Maleficent" | 3:50 |
| 4. | "See You in Hell" | 3:49 |
| 5. | "I Am the Storm" | 4:22 |
| 6. | "Fire and Ice" | 4:35 |
| 7. | "Live Before You Die" | 4:09 |
| 8. | "Revenge" | 4:37 |
| 9. | "Demons" | 3:56 |
| 10. | "Tell Me Why" | 3:57 |
| 11. | "See You in Hell (Acoustic)" | 3:49 |
| 12. | "Tell Me Why (Acoustic)" | 3:42 |
| 13. | "Marching on Versailles (Instrumental)" | 3:51 |
| 14. | "See You in Hell (Instrumental)" | 3:51 |
| 15. | "This Is Halloween" | 3:14 |
| Total length: | | 61:20 |

== Personnel ==
Band members

- Melissa Bonny – vocals
- Adrian Thessenvitz – guitars
- Jonas Asplind – bass
- Niklas Müller – drums

== Charts ==
| Chart (2020) | Peak position |
|---|---|
| Swiss Albums (Schweizer Hitparade) | 69 |
