= Abyss (Ad Infinitum album) =

Studio album by Ad Infinitum
- Released: 11 October 2024
- Studio: Hansen Studios
- Genre: Symphonic metal, post-hardcore, pop metal
- Length: 37:38
- Label: Napalm
- Producer: Jacob Hansen; Christoffer Stjerne; Ad Infinitum

Ad Infinitum chronology
Chapter III: Downfall (2023)	Abyss (2024)

Singles from Abyss
- 1. "Outer Space" Released: 25 April 2024; 2. "My Halo" Released: 25 July 2024; 3. "Surrender" Released: 29 August 2024; 4. "Follow Me Down" Released: 10 October 2024; 5. "Anthem for the Broken" Released: 20 November 2024

Abyss is the fourth studio album by the Swiss symphonic metal band Ad Infinitum, released by Napalm Records on 11 October 2024.

== Reception ==
The album received largely positive reviews from critics, but was polarising among fans due to its movement away from the style of the band's previous albums. Distorted Sound Magazine commented on this, saying "Abyss needs to be judged as the album it is, rather than the album people thought it should be. And on that basis, it would be tough to feel disappointed".

== Track listing ==
Abyss track listing
No.	Title	Length
1.	"My Halo"	3:44
2.	"Follow Me Down"	3:08
3.	"Outer Space"	4:28
4.	"Aftermath"	3:31
5.	"Euphoria"	4:16
6.	"Surrender"	3:46
7.	"Anthem for the Broken"	4:19
8.	"The One You'll Hold On To"	3:33
9.	"Parasite"	3:30
10.	"Dead End"	3:23
Total length:		37:38

== Personnel ==
Band members

- Melissa Bonny – vocals
- Adrian Thessenvitz – guitar
- Korbinian Benedict – bass guitar
- Niklas Müller – drums

Additional personnel

- Jacob Hansen – producer
- Christoffer Stjerne – producer
- Stefan Heilemann – cover artwork

== Charts ==
Chart performance for Abyss
Chart (2024)	Peak position
Austrian Albums (Ö3 Austria)	46
German Albums (Offizielle Top 100)	45
Swiss Albums (Schweizer Hitparade)	23
UK Album Downloads (OCC)	46
UK Independent Albums (OCC)	29
UK Rock & Metal Albums (OCC)	11
