= Chapter II: Legacy =

Studio album by Ad Infinitum
- Released: 29 October 2021
- Genre: Symphonic metal
- Length: 44:55
- Label: Napalm
- Producer: Jacob Hansen, Ad Infinitum

Ad Infinitum chronology
Chapter I: Monarchy (2020)	Chapter II: Legacy (2021)	Chapter III: Downfall (2023)

Chapter II: Legacy is the second studio album by the Swiss symphonic metal band Ad Infinitum, released by Napalm Records on 29 October 2021.

== Reception ==
The album received mostly positive reviews. Tuonela magazine said, "we are definitely getting a heavier and darker side of Ad Infinitum, as the band delivers a technically proficient yet incredibly accessible album. Despite the different directions the music takes, the album is pretty cohesive and flows together really well. The twelve tracks are rich, nuanced, and complex with many layers of dramatic orchestration, courtesy of Elias Holmlid, that add to the epic and majestic feel of the album, which is a more than worthy follow-up to Chapter I – Monarchy."

== Track listing ==
No.	Title	Length
1.	"Reinvented"	3:22
2.	"Unstoppable"	4:13
3.	"Inferno"	3:57
4.	"Your Enemy"	3:52
5.	"Afterlife"	3:35
6.	"Breathe"	3:09
7.	"Animals"	3:43
8.	"Into the Night"	3:04
9.	"Son of Wallachia"	3:59
10.	"My Justice, Your Pain"	4:10
11.	"Haunted"	3:37
12.	"Lullaby"	3:57
Total length:		44:55

== Personnel ==
Band members

- Melissa Bonny – vocals
- Adrian Thessenvitz – guitar
- Korbinian Benedict – bass guitar
- Niklas Müller – drums

== Charts ==
Chart (2021)	Peak position
Swiss Albums (Schweizer Hitparade)	37
