= Chapter III: Downfall =

Studio album by Ad Infinitum
- Released: 31 March 2023
- Genre: Symphonic metal
- Length: 54:12
- Label: Napalm
- Producer: Jacob Hansen, Ad Infinitum

Ad Infinitum chronology
Chapter II: Legacy (2021)	Chapter III: Downfall (2023)	Abyss (2024)

Chapter III: Downfall is the third studio album by the Swiss symphonic metal band Ad Infinitum, released by Napalm Records on 31 March 2023.

== Reception ==
The album received mostly positive reviews. Distorted Sound stated: "Heavily inspired by the history and mythology of Ancient Egypt, 'Chapter III - Downfall' is an album where every track is a potential single in waiting, it's a lean, efficient and finely-tuned machine. It's three-quarters-of-an-hour packed with pop choruses, bouncy rhythms and catchy melodies, with just the right amount of grit under the fingernails."

== Track listing ==
No.	Title	Length
1.	"Eternal Rains"	3:54
2.	"Upside Down"	3:16
3.	"Seth"	3:44
4.	"From the Ashes"	4:42
5.	"Somewhere Better"	4:08
6.	"The Underworld"	4:00
7.	"Ravenous"	3:38
8.	"Under the Burning Skies"	3:58
9.	"Architect of Paradise"	3:33
10.	"The Serpent's Downfall"	4:07
11.	"New Dawn"	3:53
12.	"Legends" (featuring Chrigel Glanzmann)	4:04
Total length:		54:12

Bonus tracks
No.	Title	Length
13.	"Upside Down" (Instrumental)	3:16
14.	"Somewhere Better" (Instrumental)	4:06

== Personnel ==
Ad Infinitum

- Melissa Bonny – vocals
- Adrian Thessenvitz – guitar
- Korbinian Benedict – bass
- Niklas Müller – drums

== Charts ==
Chart (2023)	Peak position
Austrian Albums (Ö3 Austria)	50
Swiss Albums (Schweizer Hitparade)	18
German Albums (Offizielle Top 100)	22
