= Ad Infinitum (Swiss band) =

Swiss symphonic metal band

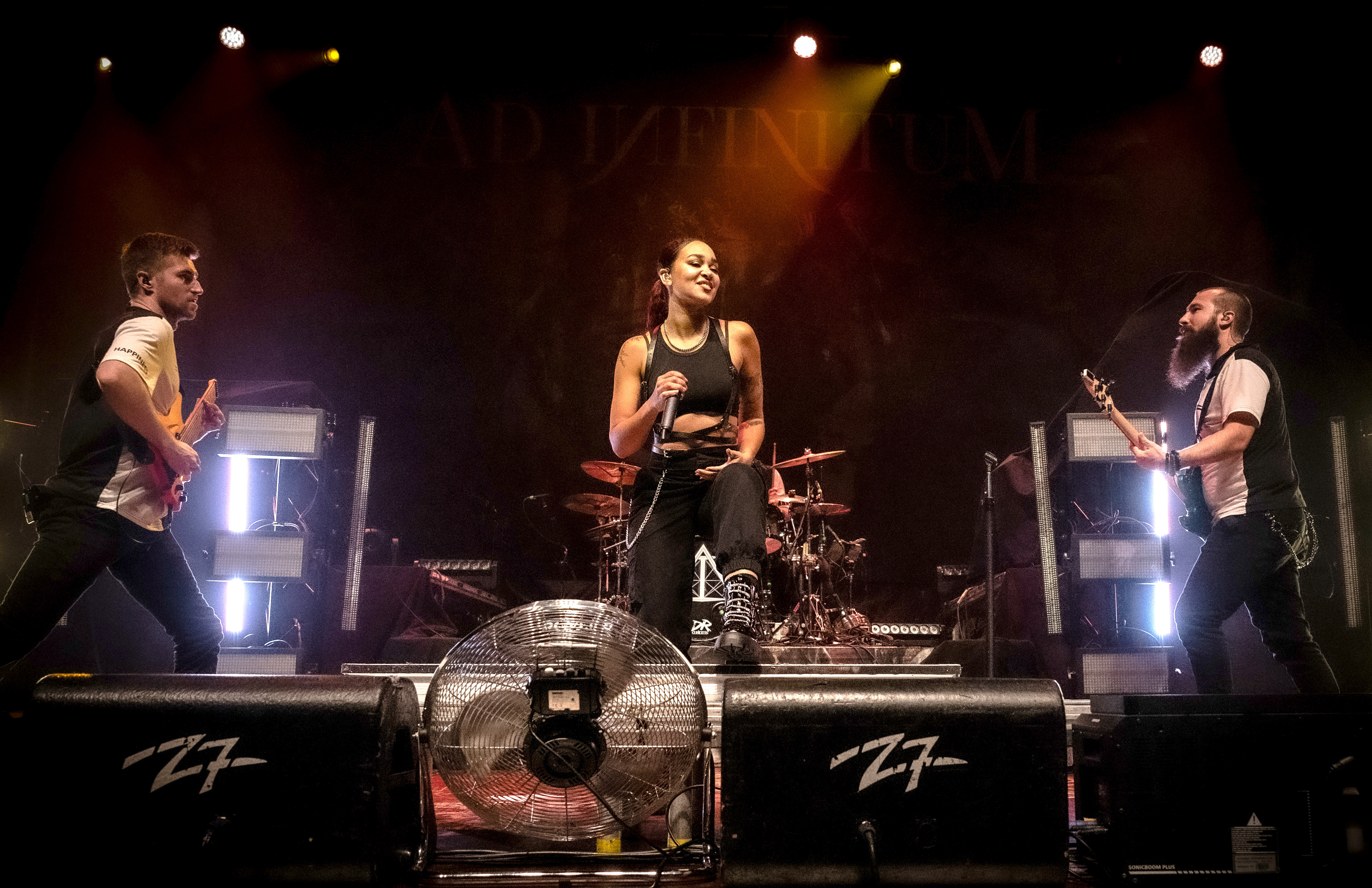
- Ad Infinitum in 2024

Background information
- Origin: Montreux, Switzerland
- Genres: Symphonic metal
- Years active: 2018–present
- Labels: Napalm Records
- Members: Melissa Bonny; Adrian Theßenvitz; Niklas Müller; Korbinian Benedict
- Past members: Jonas Asplind
- Website: adinfinitumofficial.com

Ad Infinitum (stylised AD IИFINITUM) is a Swiss symphonic metal band. Originally a solo project of Swiss singer Melissa Bonny, it turned into a full band with the arrival of drummer Niklas Müller, bassist Jonas Asplind and guitarist Adrian Theßenvitz. The band signed with Napalm Records in July 2019 and released a debut album, Chapter I: Monarchy, in April 2020. In December 2020, Asplind announced he was leaving the band due to health issues, to be replaced by Korbinian Benedict as the new bassist.

== History ==
Ad Infinitum began as a solo project of Rage of Light vocalist Melissa Bonny. In November 2018, she released a debut single, "I Am the Storm", recorded with guest musicians including former Delain guitarist Timo Somers, and launched a crowdfunding campaign to help her finance the production of an upcoming album. The campaign was a success, and during 2019 the project expanded to include drummer Niklas Müller and guitarist Adrian Theßenvitz from Germany, and Follow the Cipher bassist Jonas Asplind from Sweden, and signed to Napalm Records.

On 31 January 2020, the band announced their debut studio album, Chapter I: Monarchy, to be released on 3 April 2020, and launched the first single from the album, "Marching on Versailles". Two more singles preceded the release of the album, "See You in Hell" on 28 February 2020 and "Live Before You Die" on 27 March 2020.

On 29 October 2020, the band announced Chapter I Revisited, an acoustic version of the debut album, which was digitally released on 4 December 2020, and presented an acoustic rendition of the lead single, "Marching on Versailles".

On 27 December 2020, the band announced that Jonas was leaving the band due to health issues with his knee, and welcomed new bassist Korbinian Benedict. Simultaneously, the bassist confirmed that the band was working on their upcoming album.

On 26 August 2021, the band announced their second studio album, Chapter II: Legacy. It was released on 29 October. The first single was "Unstoppable".

In October 2022, the band announced their third studio album, Chapter III: Downfall. It was released on 31 March 2023. The first single supporting the album was "Upside Down".

In July 2024, the band announced their fourth studio album, Abyss. It was released on 11 October 2024.

== Band members ==
Ad Infinitum live at Rockharz 2023

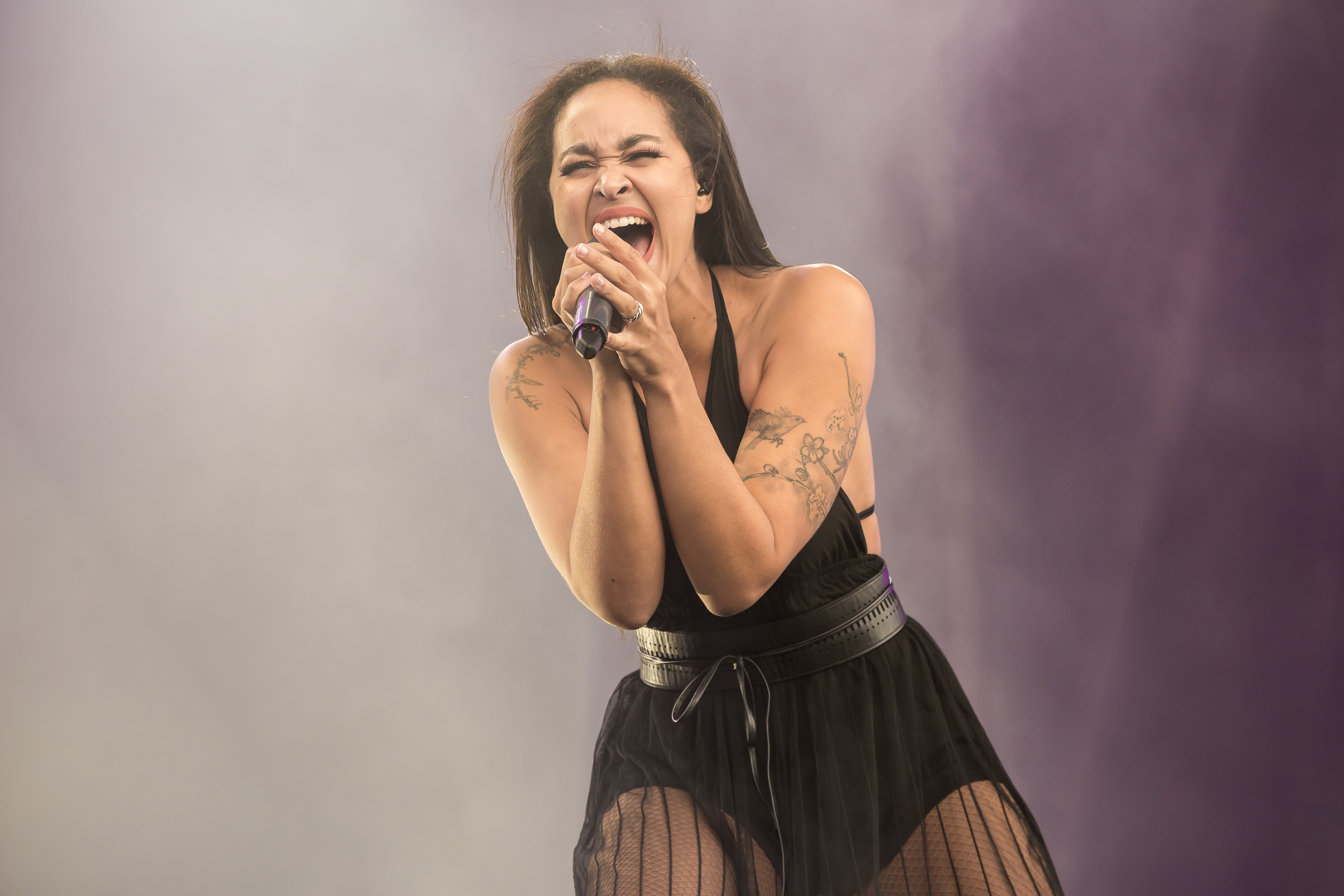
Melissa Bonny

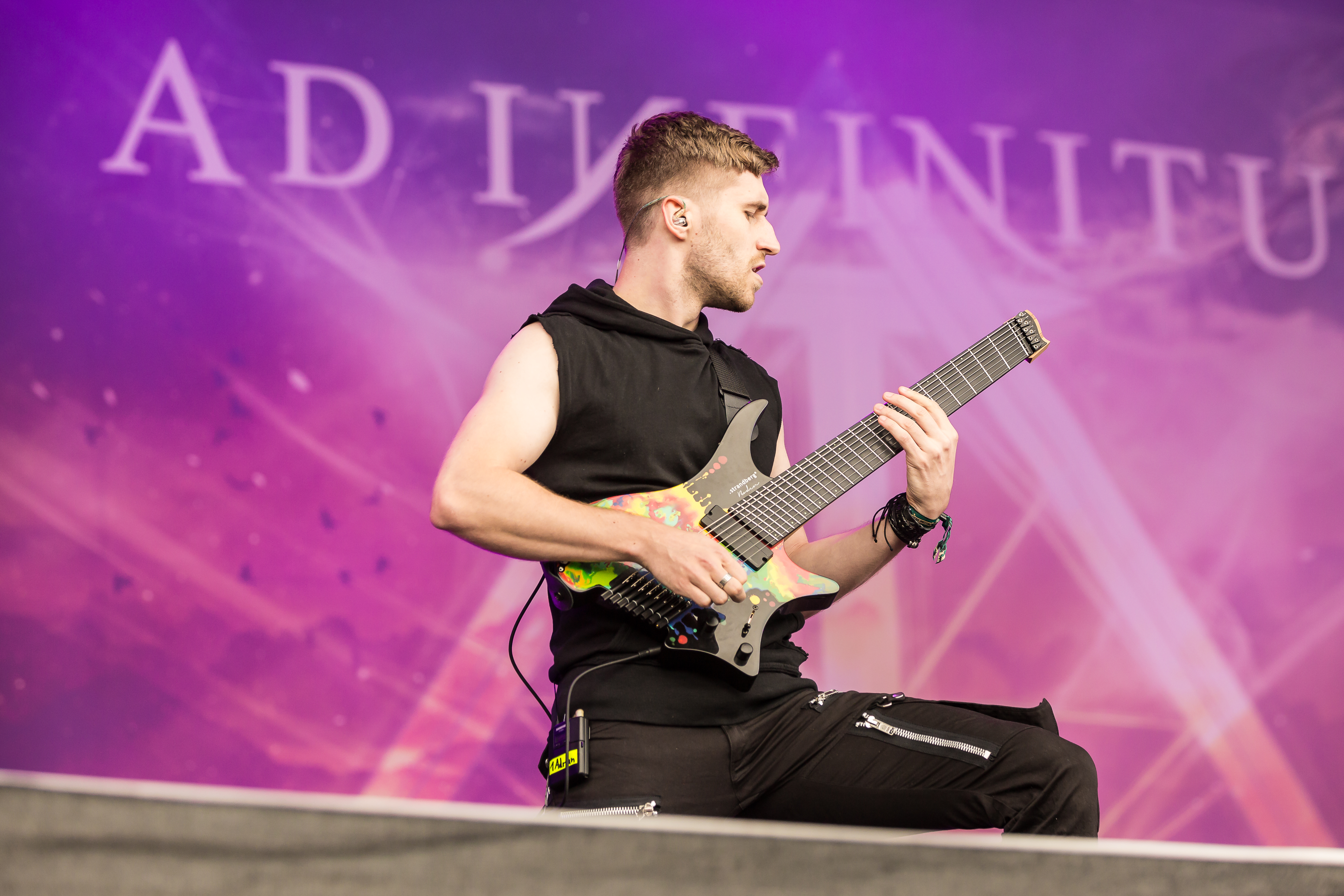
Adrian Theßenvitz

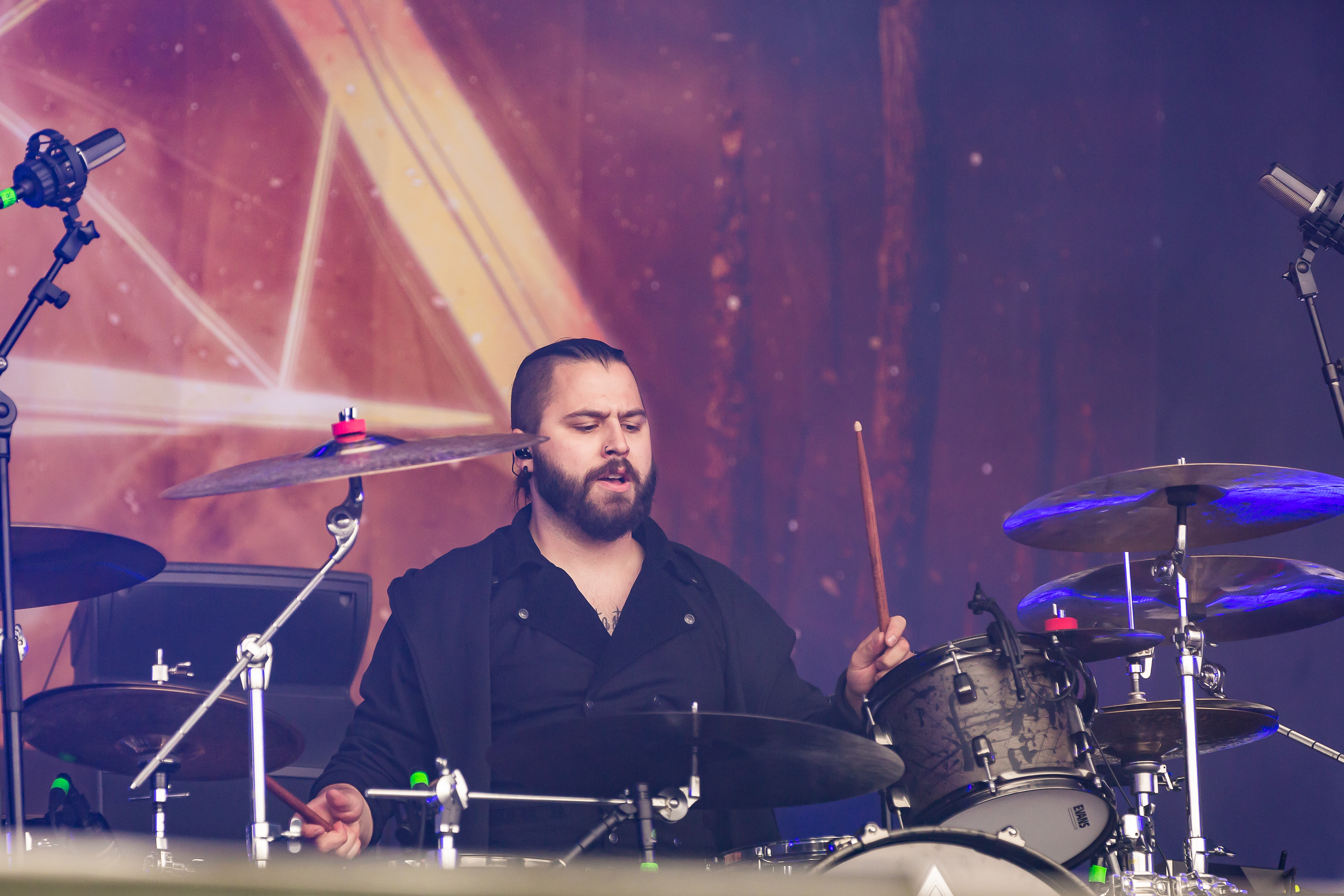
Niklas Müller

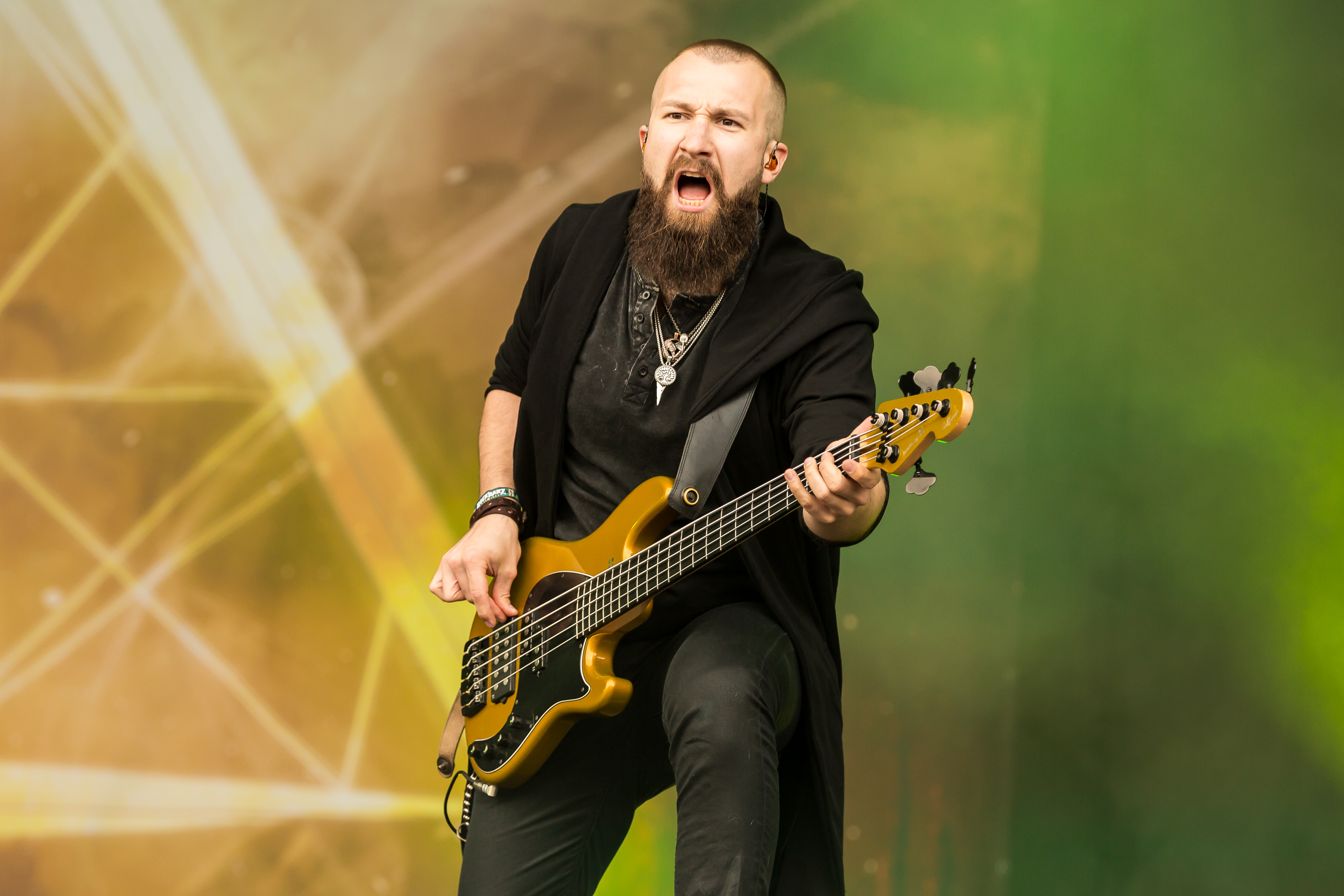
Korbinian Benedict

Current

- Melissa Bonny – vocals (2018–present)
- Adrian Theßenvitz – guitars (2019–present)
- Niklas Müller – drums (2019–present)
- Korbinian Benedict – bass (2020–present)

Former

- Jonas Asplind – bass (2019–2020)

Timeline

== Discography ==
Studio albums

- Chapter I: Monarchy (2020)
- Chapter II: Legacy (2021)
- Chapter III: Downfall (2023)
- Abyss (2024)

Acoustic

- Chapter I Revisited (2020)

Singles

- "I Am the Storm" (2018)
- "Marching on Versailles" (2020)
- "See You in Hell" (2020)
- "Live Before You Die" (2020)
- "Fire and Ice" (2020)
- "Marching on Versailles (acoustic)" (2020)
- "Demons (acoustic)" (2020)
- "Unstoppable" (2021)
- "Afterlife" (2021)
- "Animals" (2021)
- "Inferno" (2021)
- "Seth" (2023)
- "Somewhere Better" (2023)
- "Upside Down" (2023)
- "From the Ashes" (2023)
- "Outer Space" (2024)
- "My Halo" (2024)
- "Surrender" (2024)
- "Follow Me Down" (2024)
- "Anthem for the Broken" (2024)
- "Regicide" (2025)
