= From Fall to Spring =

German metal band

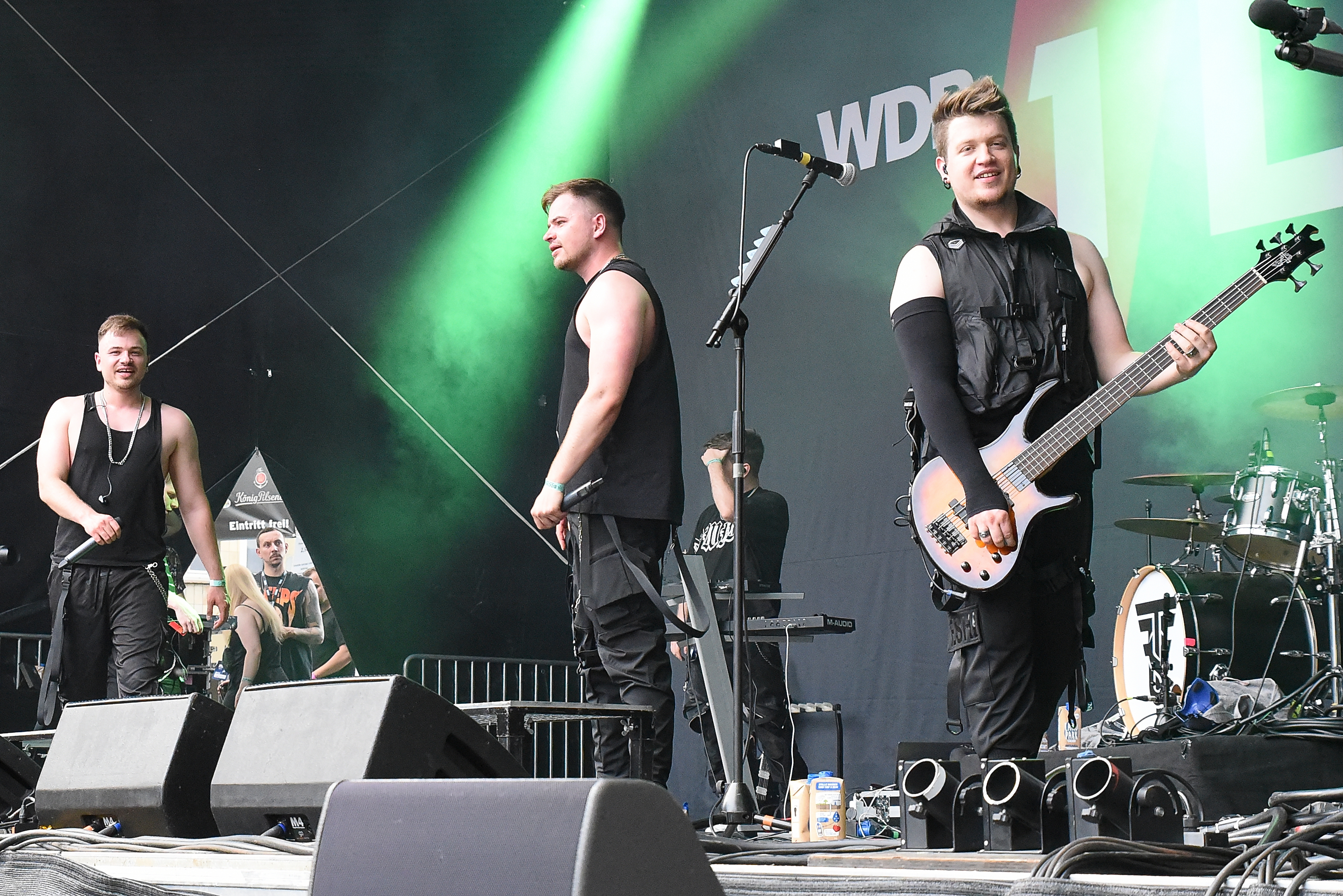
- From Fall to Spring performing at Bochum Total in 2023

Background information
- Also known as: FFTS, Basement Project
- Origin: Neunkirchen, Saarland, Germany
- Genres: Metalcore, alternative metal
- Years active: 2008–present
- Label: Arising Empire (2021–)
- Members: Philip Wilhelm; Lukas Wilhelm; Simon Triem; Sebastian Monzel; León Arend; Benedikt Veith
- Past members: Matthias Hansen; Marius Meinecke
- Website: fromfalltospring.de

From Fall to Spring is a German metalcore band formed in Neunkirchen, Saarland, in 2008 under the name Basement Project.

The group released their debut album Rise under Arising Empire in 2023; it charted on the official German Albums Chart. The band applied for the national finals of the Eurovision Song Contest 2023 but did not qualify.

== History ==
The band was started in Neunkirchen, Saarland, in 2008 by brothers Philip and Lukas Wilhelm and Benedikt Veith while they were still in school. The initial lineup was completed by Matthias Hansen and Marius Meinecke. The band released two songs and performed a few concerts, including at the 2012 Halberg Open Air.

In 2016, keyboardist Meinecke left the group. In 2017 they began working professionally. After a second lineup change, From Fall to Spring consists of Philip and Lukas Wilhelm, who are both vocalists and guitarists, third guitarist Sebastian Monzel, keyboardist Simon Triem, bassist León Arend, and drummer Benedikt Veith. In 2017, the band released their debut EP A Better Tomorrow, which was produced and released independently. A second EP, Disconnected, was released two years later. The band was scheduled to tour Germany as a supporting act for Fight the Fade in May 2020, but the tour was canceled due to the COVID-19 pandemic and the restrictions imposed by the German government.

In September 2021, the group signed a contract with the German label Arising Empire and released several singles thereafter. In the summer of 2022, the band performed at several music festivals in Germany, including Pell Mell Festival and With Full Force. They announced via TikTok that they had applied for the national finals of the Eurovision Song Contest 2023 with their song "Draw the Line". The band received the second most votes on TikTok, behind German schlager musician Ikke Hüftgold, who was later the runner-up in the national finals. The group announced that they would apply for the national finals of the Eurovision Song Contest the following year but were declined after their official application. From Fall to Spring released their debut album, Rise, on 14 April 2023. The album ranked at number 73 on the German Album Charts.

== Musical style ==
From Fall to Spring plays a melodic variation of metalcore and has been compared to modern metal acts such as Bring Me the Horizon, Architects, Falling in Reverse, and Breaking Benjamin.

== Discography ==
=== Studio albums ===
| Title | Details | Peak chart positions |
| Title | Details | GER |
|---|---|---|
| Rise | Released: 14 April 2023; Label: Arising Empire; Formats: CD, digital download, streaming | 73 |
| Entry Wounds | Released: 26 September 2025; Label: Arising Empire | |

=== Extended plays ===
| Title | Details |
|---|---|
| A Better Tomorrow | Released: 16 April 2017; Label: Self-released |
| Disconnected | Released: 19 January 2019; Label: Self-released; Formats: Digital download, streaming |

=== Singles ===
| Title | Year | Album or EP |
|---|---|---|
| "Hear Me Out" | 2018 | Disconnected |
| "Fading Away" | 2018 | Disconnected |
| "Supernova" | 2020 | Rise |
| "Retrospect" | 2020 | Non-album single |
| "Rise" | 2021 | Rise |
| "Br4infck" | 2021 | Rise |
| "Black Heart" | 2021 | Rise |
| "Destiny" | 2021 | Rise |
| "Barriers" | 2022 | Rise |
| "Popular Monster" (with Youth Never Dies and Nick Eyra featuring Onlap) | 2023 | Non-album single |
| "Cast Away" | 2024 | Entry Wounds |
| "Control" | 2025 | Entry Wounds |
| "Come Alive" | 2025 | Entry Wounds |
| "Take the Pain Away" | 2025 | Entry Wounds |

=== Other collaborations ===
| Title | Year | Album or EP |
|---|---|---|
| "Iris" (with UMC featuring Anna-Lena Derer) | 2022 | 90s in Metal, Vol. 2 |
| "I Want It That Way" (with UMC) | 2022 | 90s in Metal, Vol. 2 |
| "Baby One More Time" (with UMC featuring Anna-Lena Derer) | 2022 | 90s in Metal, Vol. 2 |
| "Dirty Diana" (with UMC) | 2023 | 80s in Metal |
| "All Again" (with Lost Zone) | 2024 | Ordinary Misery |
| "Start a Comeback" (with Flash Forward) | 2024 | Renegade |
| "The Emptiness Machine" (with UMC featuring Matthias Schneck) | 2024 | Non-album single |
