= Reliquiae (band) =

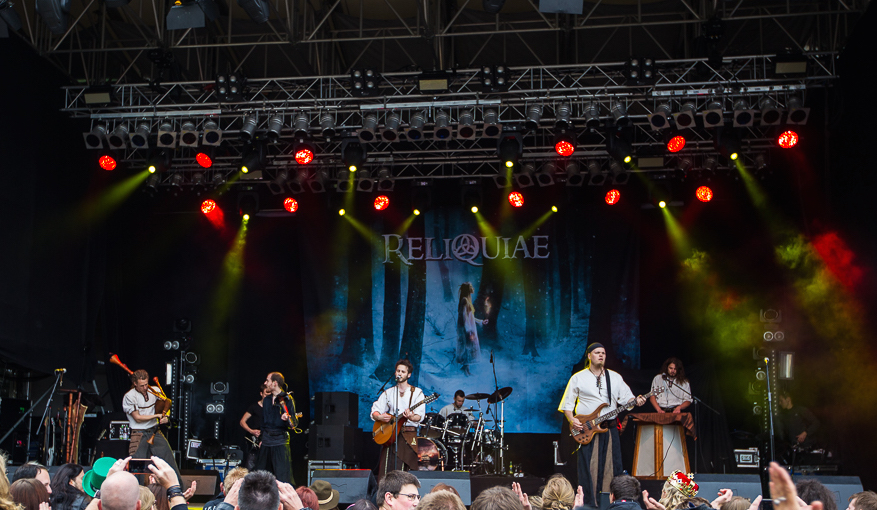
Reliquiae Feuertanz

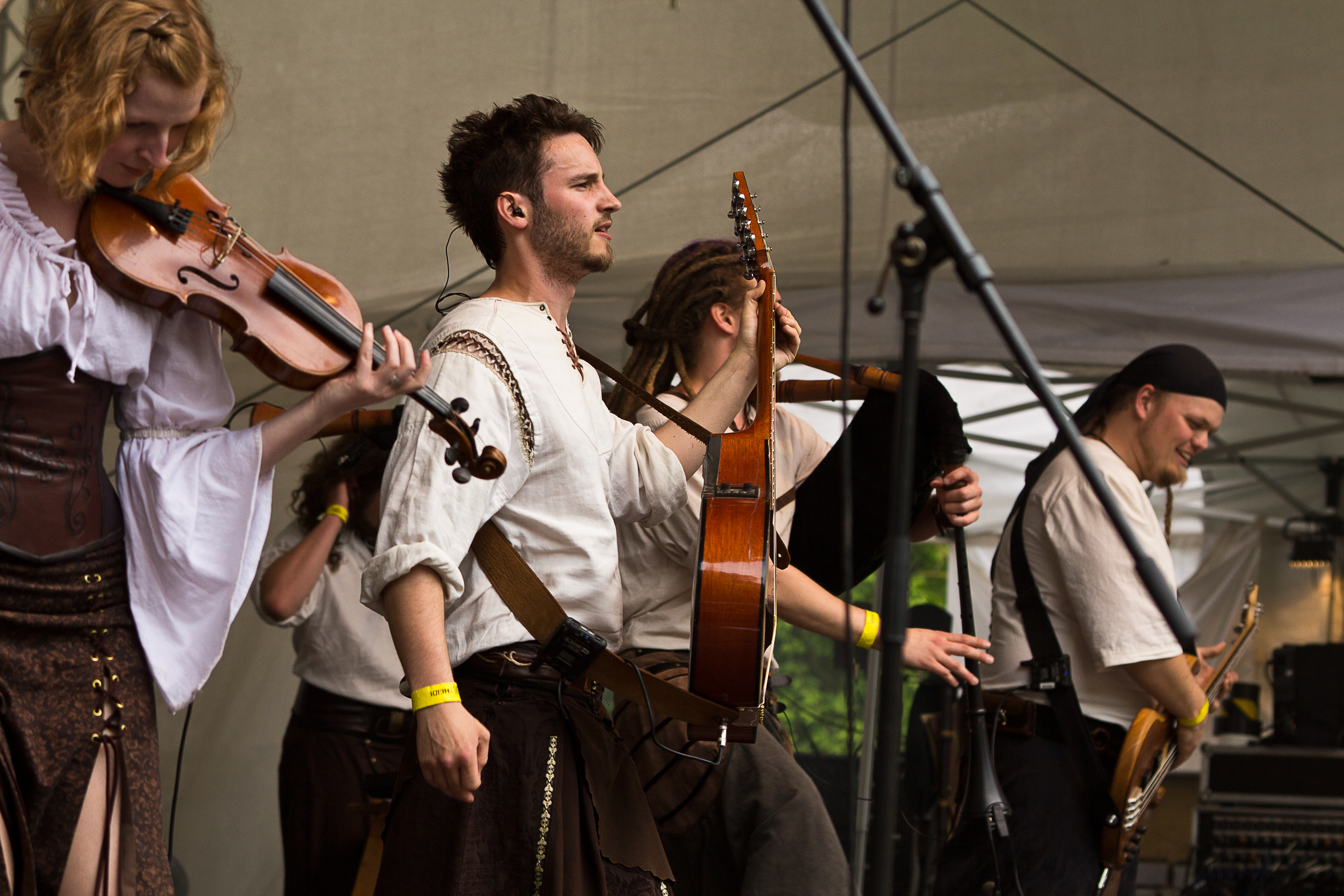
Reliquiae Wave-Gotik-Treffen 2015 06

Reliquiae are a German band which plays rock styled medieval music and folk music. They have played at the Wacken festival and other festivals.

== Discography ==
- 2009: Prolog (Mini-Album)
- 2011: Audi, Vide, Tace album
- 2012: Am Teich (Remix-EP)
- 2013: Pandora album
- 2016: Winter album
