= Glas (album) =

- Digital album cover

Studio album by Nina Chuba
- Released: 24 February 2023
- Genre: Pop; German hip hop; Dancehall
- Length: 49:00
- Label: Jive Germany, Sony Music

Nina Chuba chronology
Average (2021)	Glas (2023)	Farbenblind (2024)

Singles from Glas
- 1. "Neben mir" Released: 1 October 2021; 2. "Alles gleich" Released: 10 December 2021; 3. "Femminello" Released: 6 May 2022; 4. "Tracksuit Velours" Released: 17 June 2022; 5. "Wildberry Lillet" Released: 12 August 2022; 6. "Ich hass dich" Released: 7 October 2022; 7. "Glatteis" Released: 2 December 2022; 8. "Mangos mit Chili" Released: 3 February 2023; 9. "Ich glaub ich will heut nicht mehr gehen" Released: 23 February 2023

Glas (German: [ˈglaːs], Glass) is the debut studio album by German singer Nina Chuba. It was released on 24 February by Sony Music Entertainment Germany.

== Background ==
The first single from Glas, "Neben mir", was Chuba's first German-language release, following a series of English-language songs released from 2019 to 2021, and the first to be released under Jive Records. The fifth single from the album, "Wildberry Lillet", was released in August 2022, and brought Chuba to mainstream success, being certified 2× Platinum, 4× Platinum and 2× Platinum in Germany, Austria and Switzerland, respectively.

Eight of the eighteen tracks on Glas were pre-released, although "Molly Moon" and "Nicht allein", two singles released before the album, were not featured on it.

The release of Glas was announced in November 2022.

== Track listing ==
No.	Title	Writer(s)	Producer(s)	Length
1.	"Mangos mit Chili ("Mangos with Chilli")"	Justin Fröhlich, Yannick Johannknecht, Nina Kaiser, Wanja Bierbaum, Michael Burek, Dokii	Dokii, Michael Burek	2:14
2.	"Wildberry Lillet"	Kaiser, Bierbaum, Fröhlich, Johannknecht	Aside, Michael Burek	2:11
3.	"Alte Bilder ("Old Pictures")"	Bierbaum, Burek, Dokii, Kaiser, Fröhlich	Dokii, Michael Burek	2:10
4.	"Mondlicht ("Moonlight")"	Tom Hengelbrock, Kaiser, Fröhlich, Bierbaum, Burek, Dokii, Marian Heim, Kilian Wilke, Johannes Burger	Dokii, Michael Burek	3:39
5.	"Neben mir ("Next to Me")"	Dokii, Nina Chuba	Dokii	2:45
6.	"Fieber ("Fever")"	Bierbaum, Burek, Dokii, Kaiser, Fröhlich, Johannknecht	Dokii, Michael Burek	2:17
7.	"Glatteis ("Black Ice")"	Flo August, Kaiser	Flo August	3:22
8.	"Sakura"	August, Kaiser	Flo August	3:06
9.	"Ich glaub ich will heut nicht mehr gehen ("I think I don't want to leave today")" (featuring Provinz)	Dokii, Farsad Zoroofchi, Burek, Kaiser, Vincent Waizenegger	Dokii, Michael Burek	2:55
10.	"Femminello"	Bierbaum, Burek, Dokii, Kaiser, Fröhlich, Jeremy Chacon, Jonas Kalisch, Henrik Meinke, Alexsej Vlasenko	Dokii, Michael Burek, Hitimpulse	2:32
11.	"Solo"	Bierbaum, Burek, Dokii, Kaiser, Chachon, Kalisch, Meinke, Vlasenko, Fröhlich	Dokii, Michael Burek, Hitimpulse	2:37
12.	"Freitag ("Friday")"	Bierbaum, Burek, Dokii, Kaiser, Fröhlich	Dokii, Michael Burek	2:08
13.	"Tracksuit Velours"	Johannknecht, Kaiser, Bierbaum	Aside	2:30
14.	"Lights Out"	Dokii, Kaiser	Dokii, Michael Burek	2:34
15.	"Glas"	Fröhlich, Kai Kotucz, Marcel Uhde, Melvin Schmitz, Kaiser, Samuele Frijo	Juh-Dee, Michael Burek, Dokii	2:42
16.	"Ich hass dich ("I hate you")" (featuring Chapo102)	Kaiser, Chapo102, August, Khrome030	Flo August	3:12
17.	"Tinnitus"	Bierbaum, Burek, Dokii, Kaiser, Fröhlich	Dokii, Michael Burek	3:02
18.	"Alles gleich ("All the same")"	Dokii, Kaiser	Dokii	2:53
Total length:				49:00

== Charts ==
Glas was Chuba's first number one on the German albums chart and the German hip hop albums chart. Additionally, Glas reached number three on the German vinyl chart.

=== Weekly charts ===
Weekly chart performance for Glas
Chart (2023)	Peak position
Austrian Albums (Ö3 Austria)	1
German Albums (Offizielle Top 100)	1
Swiss Albums (Schweizer Hitparade)	5

=== Year-end charts ===
2023 year-end chart positions for Glas
Chart (2023)	Position
Austrian Albums (Ö3 Austria)	11
German Albums (Offizielle Top 100)	8
Swiss Albums (Schweizer Hitparade)	11

2024 year-end chart positions for Glas
Chart (2024)	Position
Austrian Albums (Ö3 Austria)	17
German Albums (Offizielle Top 100)	7
Swiss Albums (Schweizer Hitparade)	33

2025 year-end chart positions for Glas
Chart (2025)	Position
Austrian Albums (Ö3 Austria)	38
German Albums (Offizielle Top 100)	17
Swiss Albums (Schweizer Hitparade)	49

== Certifications ==
Certifications for Glas
Region	Certification	Certified units/sales
Germany (BVMI)	Platinum	200,000^{‡}
Switzerland (IFPI Switzerland)	Gold	10,000^{‡}
^{‡} Sales+streaming figures based on certification alone.
