= E-Werk (Erlangen) =

Music venue in Erlangen, Germany

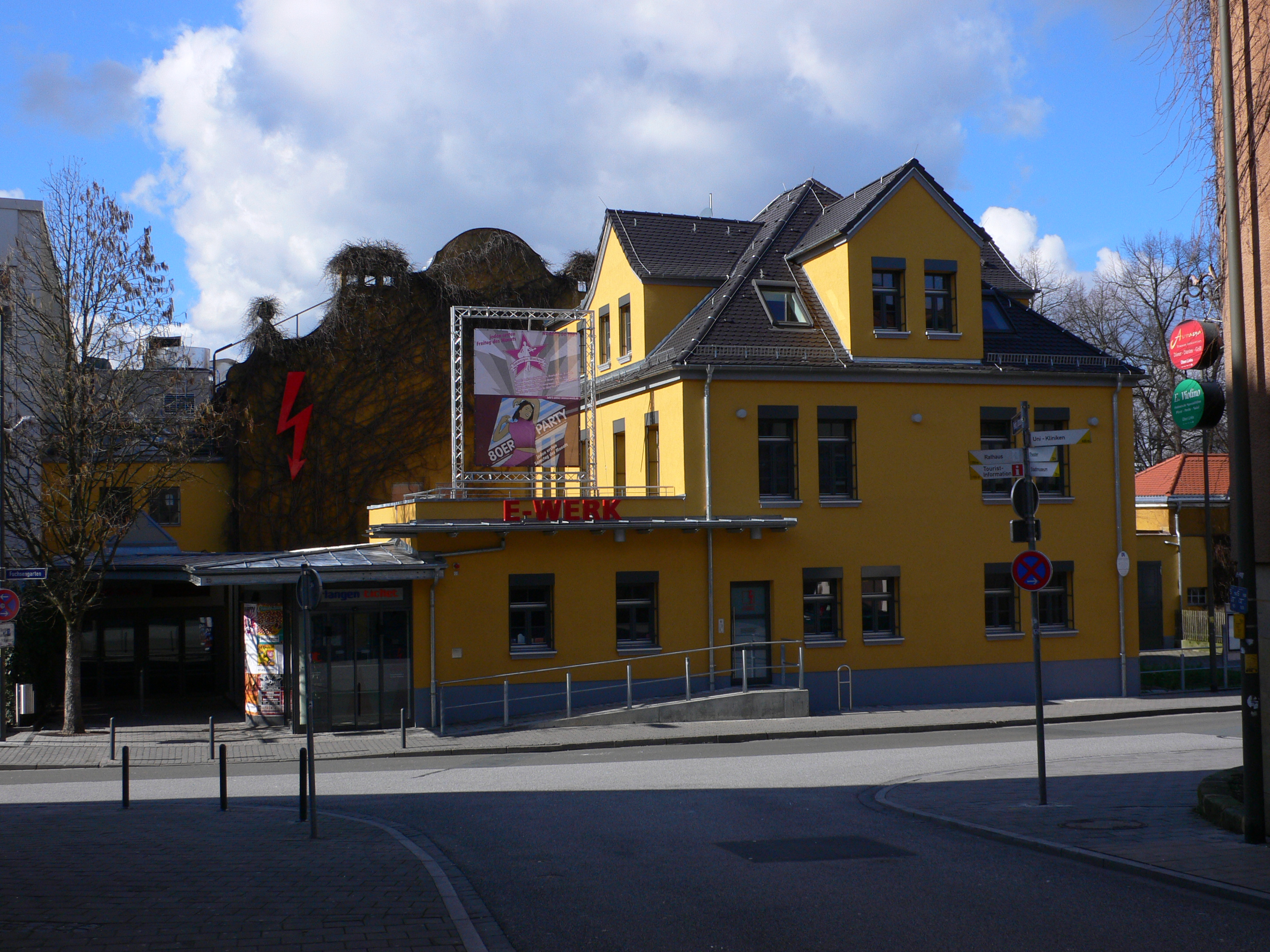

- Location within Bavaria Location within Germany
- Interactive map of the E-Werk area

General information
- Type: Cultural centre
- Location: Erlangen, Germany
- Coordinates: 49°36′02″N 11°00′06″E

Website
- www.e-werk.de

The E-Werk is a music venue in Erlangen, Germany that opened in 1982. Many notable artists have performed at the venue, including Wishbone Ash, Uriah Heep, Blue Öyster Cult, K.Flay and Hawkwind.
