= Nina Chuba =

German singer (born 1998)

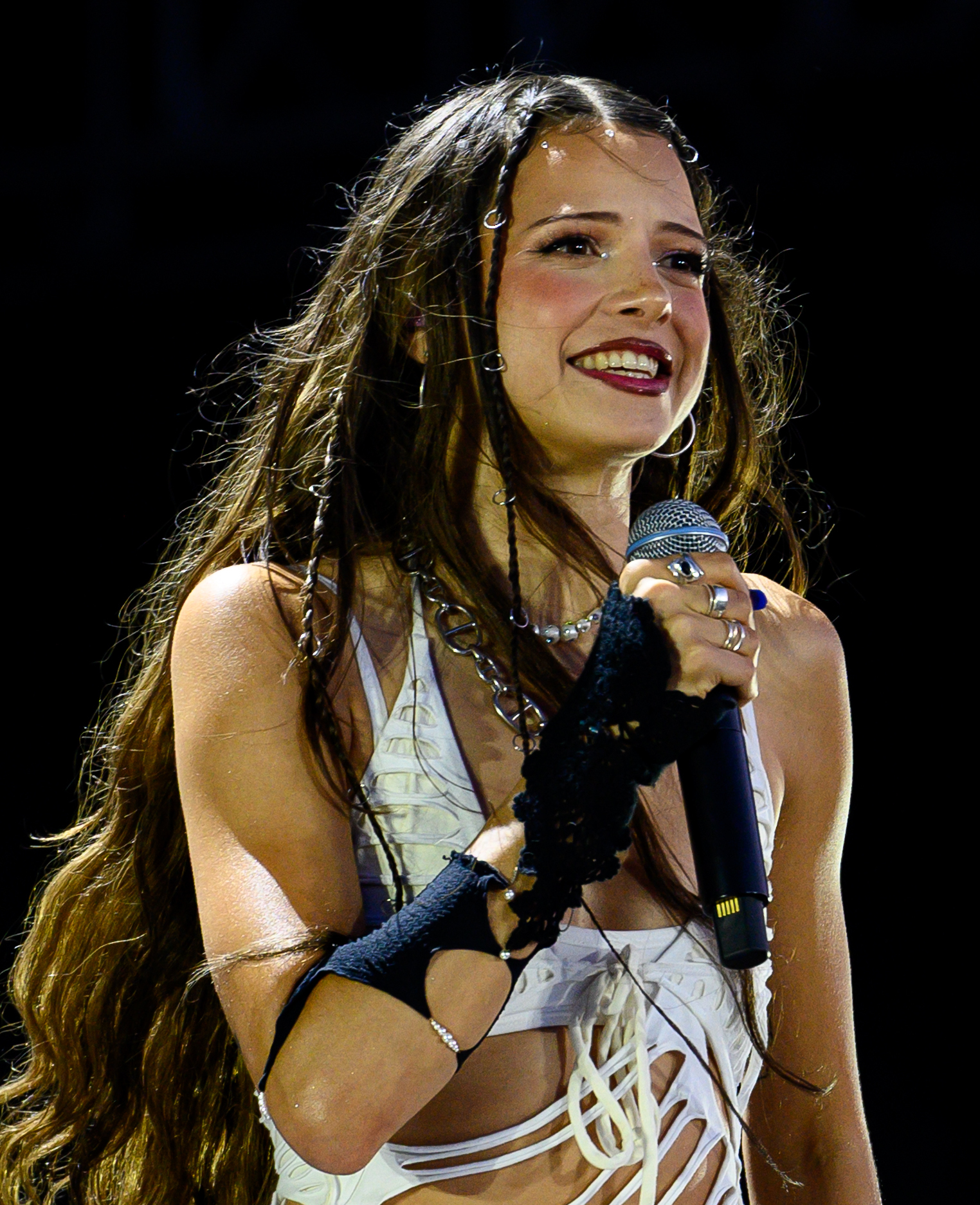
- Chuba in 2025
- Born: Nina Katrin Kaiser; 14 October 1998 (age 28); Wedel, Schleswig-Holstein, Germany
- Occupations: Singer; actress
- Years active: 2008–present
- Musical career
- Genres: Pop rap; dancehall-pop
- Instrument: Vocals
- Label: Jive Germany

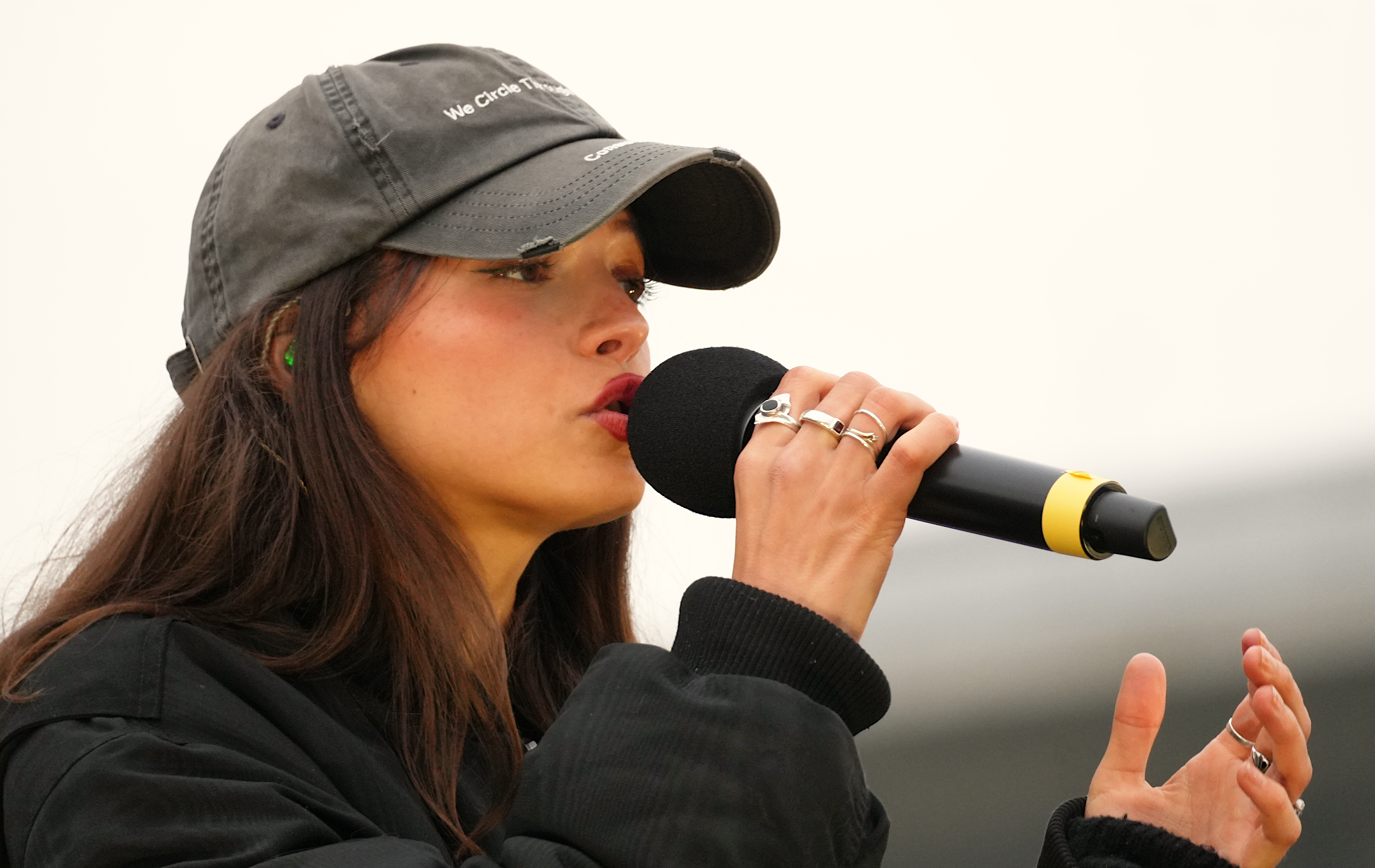
Nina Chuba sings at the Brandmauer demonstration in Berlin on 2 February 2025

Nina Katrin Kaiser (born 14 October 1998), known professionally as Nina Chuba, is a German singer and actress. She was born in Wedel, Schleswig-Holstein and rose to prominence in 2022 with her single "Wildberry Lillet", reaching number one on both the Austrian and German charts.

At the age of seven, she began her acting career in the children's television series Die Pfefferkörner. Following a move to Berlin in 2018, Chuba began releasing music, with the English-language EPs Power and Average. In October 2021, she released her first German-language single "Neben mir". Her debut album Glas was released on 24 February 2023. It reached sixth place in the global album debut charts on Spotify and topped the album charts of Germany and Austria. Following a 13-month hiatus, she returned with the self-titled single "Nina" on 12 April 2024.

== Career ==
=== 2018–2021: Power and Average ===
Following a move to Berlin in 2018, Nina Chuba began to release music. Initially performing in English, she expressed her reluctance to sing in German as "everything sounds cheesy more quickly", whereas in English, "you can have whack lyrics and a nice melody, and it's fine". Her first single "White Shirt" was released in July 2019, and was followed by a further five singles over the next year. These six singles were released as the Power extended play on 31 July 2020.

On 27 November 2020, Chuba released the single "Babylon Fall", her first since Power. The track saw her leaning further into a hip hop sound. It was included on the Average EP, released on 4 June 2021.

=== 2021–2023: Glas ===
On 1 October 2021, Nina Chuba released her first German-language single, "Neben mir" about a toxic love affair. On 12 August 2022, Chuba released the single "Wildberry Lillet". On the track, she raps about her desire to get rich and gain further commercial success. The song quickly achieved virality on TikTok. Debuting at number two in Germany, the song became her first single to chart in her home country. The following week, it rose to number one, where it would spend four non-consecutive weeks. A remix was released of the song with rapper Juju, for which a music video was released on 16 September 2022. The singles "Ich hass dich", "Glatteis" and "Mangos mit Chili" were also released in promotion of her debut studio album Glas, released via Jive Records on 24 February 2023. The album topped the charts in Germany and Austria, and was certified gold in Germany for shipments exceeding 300,000 copies.

=== 2024–present: Ich lieb mich, ich lieb mich nicht ===
Following the release of Glas, Chuba took a 13-month break, before releasing the self-titled single "Nina" on 12 April 2024. In April and May 2024, she embarked on the Glas Tour, with 16 sold-out arena dates in Germany, Austria and Switzerland. On 24 May 2024, she released the single "80qm". A music video for the track was released on the same day. It is a break-up song, with the title referring to her reclamation of the 80 square metres of apartment space she previously shared with her partner. On 8 November 2024, she released the single "Fata Morgana" ahead of the release of the Farbenblind EP on 6 December 2024.

In 2025, Chuba released the singles "Ende", "Unsicher", "Wenn das Liebe ist" and "Rage Girl". During a concert at Berlin's Parkbühne Wuhlheide on 18 July 2025, she announced her second studio album Ich lieb mich, ich lieb mich nicht which was released on 19 September 2025. Following the album's release, she will embark on her first large-scale arena tour with dates in Germany and Switzerland.

In Fortnite, she was the first German artist to get her own island, where fans can recreate the virtual musician's studio and tour stage and watch an exclusive performance.

== Discography ==
=== Studio albums ===
List of studio albums, with selected details
Title	Details	Peak chart positions			Certifications
Title	Details	GER	AUT	SWI	Certifications
Glas	Released: 24 February 2023; Label: Jive; Formats: LP, CD, digital download, streaming	1	1	5	BVMI: Platinum; IFPI AUT: Platinum; IFPI SWI: Gold
Ich lieb mich, ich lieb mich nicht	Released: 19 September 2025; Label: Jive; Formats: LP, CD, digital download, streaming	1	1	2	BVMI: Gold

=== Extended plays ===
List of EPs, with selected details
Title	Details	Peak chart positions		
Title	Details	GER	AUT	SWI
Power	Released: 31 July 2020; Formats: Digital download, streaming	—	—	—
Average	Released: 4 June 2021; Formats: Digital download, streaming	—	—	—
Farbenblind	Released: 6 December 2024; Label: Jive; Formats: LP, CD, digital download, streaming	3	5	14

=== Singles ===
==== As lead artist ====
List of singles as lead artist, with chart positions and certifications, showing year released and album name
Title	Year	Peak chart positions			Certifications	Album or EP
Title	Year	GER	AUT	SWI	Certifications	Album or EP
"My Time"	2018	—	—	—		Non-album single
"White Shirt"	2019	—	—	—		Power
"I Owe You Nothing"	2019	—	—	—		Power
"Lips Shut"	2019	—	—	—		Power
"I Can't Sleep"	2020	—	—	—		Power
"Power"	2020	—	—	—		Power
"King"	2020	—	—	—		Non-album single
"Jungle"	2020	—	—	—		Power
"Trying Not to Think About You" (with Filous)	2020	—	—	—		Non-album single
"Babylon Fall"	2020	—	—	—		Average
"Yellow Black Blue"	2021	—	—	—		Average
"Who Hurt You"	2021	—	—	—		Average
"22s" (with Dillistone & Kiko)	2021	—	—	—		Non-album single
"Levitating"	2021	—	—	—		Average
"Neben mir"	2021	—	—	—		Glas
"Molly Moon"	2021	—	—	—		Non-album single
"Alles gleich"	2021	—	—	—		Glas
"Nicht allein"	2022	—	—	—		Non-album single
"Femminello"	2022	—	—	—		Glas
"Tracksuit Velours"	2022	—	—	—		Glas
"Wildberry Lillet"	2022	1	1	6	BVMI: Diamond; IFPI AUT: 4× Platinum; IFPI SWI: 2× Platinum	Glas
"Ich hass dich" (with Chapo102)	2022	8	12	31	BVMI: 3× Gold; IFPI AUT: Platinum; IFPI SWI: Gold	Glas
"Glatteis"	2022	19	54	74	BVMI: Gold; IFPI AUT: Gold	Glas
"Mangos mit Chili"	2023	4	13	56	BVMI: Platinum; IFPI AUT: Platinum; IFPI SWI: Gold	Glas
"Ich glaub ich will heut nicht mehr gehen" (featuring Provinz)	2023	13	16	28	BVMI: Gold; IFPI AUT: Gold	Glas
"Nina"	2024	15	26	28		Ich lieb mich, ich lieb mich nicht
"80qm"	2024	15	25	38		Non-album single
"Randali" (with Chapo102)	2024	28	44	—		Helldunkel
"Fata Morgana"	2024	2	3	7	BVMI: Platinum; IFPI AUT: Gold; IFPI SWI: Gold	Farbenblind
"Ende"	2025	36	52	80		Ich lieb mich, ich lieb mich nicht
"Unsicher"	2025	3	1	2	BVMI: Gold; IFPI SWI: Gold	Ich lieb mich, ich lieb mich nicht
"Wenn das Liebe ist"	2025	2	2	6	BVMI: Gold; IFPI SWI: Gold	Ich lieb mich, ich lieb mich nicht
"Rage Girl"	2025	17	22	65		Ich lieb mich, ich lieb mich nicht
"Fucked Up" (featuring Makko)	2025	3	3	13		Ich lieb mich, ich lieb mich nicht
"3 Uhr Nachts"	2025	18	20	69		Ich lieb mich, ich lieb mich nicht
"—" denotes releases that did not chart or were not released in that territory.

==== As featured artist ====
List of singles as featured artist, with chart positions, showing year released and album name
Title	Year	Peak chart positions							Album
Title	Year	GER	AUT	BLR Air.	CIS Air.	KAZ Air.	RUS Air.	SWI	Album
"Zorn & Liebe" (Provinz featuring Nina Chuba)	2022	55	—	—	—	—	—	—	Zorn & Liebe
"AMG" (RIN featuring Nina Chuba and Miksu / Macloud)	2023	8	14	—	—	—	—	19	Non-album single
"Fühlst du gar nichts?" (Ennio featuring Nina Chuba)	2024	33	—	—	—	—	—	—	Schlaraffenland
"Liebe" (Ufo361 featuring Nina Chuba)	2024	8	17	8	23	6	18	34	Nur für Dich 2
"—" denotes releases that did not chart or were not released in that territory.

=== Other charted songs ===
List of other charted songs with chart positions, showing year released and album name
Title	Year	Peak chart positions			Album
Title	Year	GER	AUT	SWI	Album
"Fliegen"	2024	23	32	35	Farbenblind
"Farbenblind"	2024	73	—	—	Farbenblind
"Waldbrand"	2024	73	—	—	Farbenblind
"Malediven"	2025	41	—	—	Ich lieb mich, ich lieb mich nicht
"Überdosis"	2025	92	—	—	Ich lieb mich, ich lieb mich nicht
"—" denotes releases that did not chart or were not released in that territory.

== Awards and nominations ==
Live Krone

- 2022: in the category „Hip-Hop/R&B-Song“(Wildberry Lillet)
- 2022: in the category „Newcomer-Act“

HipHop.de-Awards

- 2022: Best female newcomer national

=== Berlin Music Video Awards ===
- 2023: Best Art Director for 'Wildberry Lillet Remix' feat. Juju
- 2025: Nominated for Best Art Director for "80QM"
- 2026: Nominated for Best Cinematography for "Rage Girl"
- 2026: Nominated for Best Art Direction for "Wenn das Liebe ist"
