= Germany in the Eurovision Song Contest 2024 =

- Eurovision Song Contest 2024
- Participating broadcaster: ARD (Note: Arbeitsgemeinschaft der öffentlich-rechtlichen Rundfunkanstalten der Bundesrepublik Deutschland) – Norddeutscher Rundfunk (NDR)
- Country: Germany
- Selection process: Eurovision Song Contest – Das deutsche Finale 2024
- Selection date: 16 February 2024

Competing entry
- Song: "Always on the Run"
- Artist: Isaak
- Songwriters: Greg Taro; Isaak Guderian; Kevin Lehr; Leo Salminen

Placement
- Final result: 12th, 117 points

Participation chronology

Germany was represented at the Eurovision Song Contest 2024 with the song "Always on the Run", written by Greg Taro, Isaak Guderian, Kevin Lehr, and Leo Salminen, and performed by Isaak himself. The German participating broadcaster on behalf of ARD, Norddeutscher Rundfunk (NDR), organised the national final Eurovision Song Contest – Das deutsche Finale 2024 in order to select their entry for the contest.

As a member of the "Big Five", Germany automatically qualified to compete in the final of the Eurovision Song Contest. Performing in position 3, Germany placed twelfth out of the 25 performing countries with 117 points, achieving its best result since 2018.

== Background ==
Prior to the 2024 contest, ARD has participated in the Eurovision Song Contest representing Germany sixty-six times since its debut in 1956, making Germany, to this point, the country with the most entries in the contest: they have taken part in every edition except in 1996 when they were eliminated in a pre-contest qualification round. They have won the contest on two occasions: in 1982 with the song "Ein bißchen Frieden" performed by Nicole and in 2010 with the song "Satellite" performed by Lena. In 2023, "Blood & Glitter" performed by Lord of the Lost placed 26th (last) in the final with 18 points.

As part of its duties as participating broadcaster, ARD organises the selection of its entry in the Eurovision Song Contest and broadcasts the event in the country. Since 1996, ARD has delegated the participation in the contest to its member Norddeutscher Rundfunk (NDR). The German consortium has used both internal selections and a variety of national final formats to select their entries in the past, chiefly sticking to the format Unser Lied für… ("Our Song for…", followed by the name of the host city) in recent years. ARD confirmed its intention to compete in the 2024 contest immediately after the 2023 final.

== Before Eurovision ==
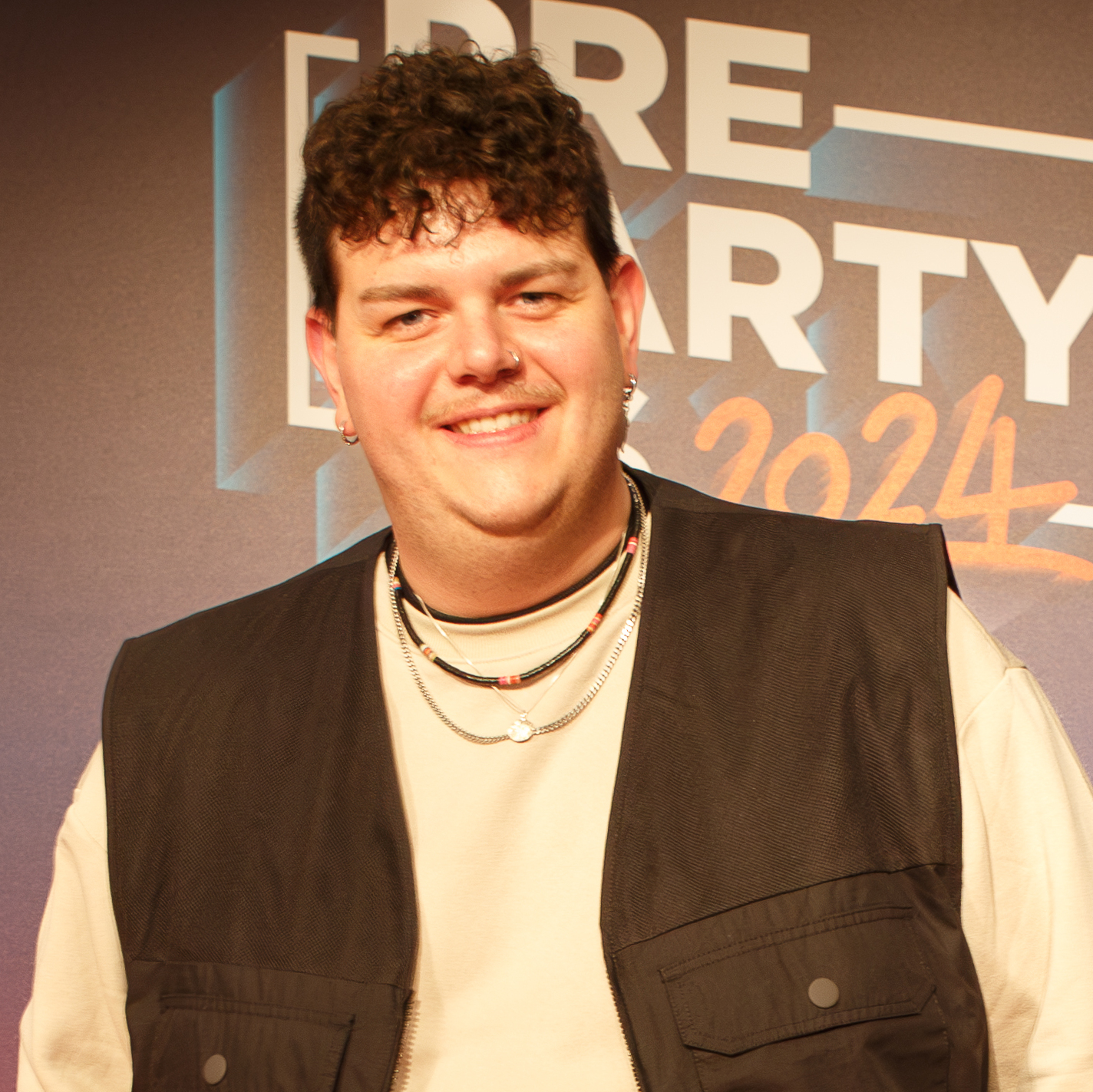
Isaak, winner of Eurovision Song Contest – Das deutsche Finale 2024, at the PrePartyES event in Madrid

=== Eurovision Song Contest – Das deutsche Finale 2024 ===
On 7 September 2023, NDR announced its intention to organise a national final, titled Eurovision Song Contest – Das deutsche Finale 2024 ("Eurovision Song Contest – The German Final 2024"). The show, which was held in Berlin on 16 February 2024 and was hosted by Barbara Schöneberger, was broadcast live on Das Erste, on the broadcaster's streaming platform ARD Mediathek, and on its official Eurovision website Eurovision.de. The winner was selected by a combination of jury votes and televoting.

The show was watched by 2.190 million viewers in Germany for a 14.7% share, marking an increase of 210,000 viewers and 3.4% share compared to Unser Lied für Liverpool in 2023 as well as the highest viewership values for a German national final since 2010.

==== Competing entries ====
A submission period for interested artists was open from 7 September to 15 October 2023. Singers or groups could apply with or without a song, and were required to upload a video performance of their song or (for those without an original composition) a cover of their choice. The competition was open to any artists and songs, without restrictions of language or nationality. At the end of the submission period, 693 artists had applied – 495 soloists, 71 duos and 127 bands – with a total of 572 songs. By 25 November 2023, these were narrowed down to 32, who were assessed by a 20-member international jury – consisting of previous jurors for their countries at Eurovision, whose names will be revealed later – to select a maximum of ten finalists by the end on the year. These, ultimately revealed to be eight, were announced and released on 19 January 2024 and were introduced via the show ESC vor acht ("ESC before eight"), consisting of eight daily broadcasts hosted by Alina Stiegler between 5 and 15 February 2024. Alongside this process, NDR launched a separate competition to determine an additional finalist, titled Ich will zum ESC! ("I want to go to the ESC!"), with fifteen contestants selected from the received applications.

Selected artists include Max Mutzke, who represented Germany in the Eurovision Song Contest 2004.

Key: Selected through Ich will zum ESC!

| Artist | Song | Songwriter(s) |
|---|---|---|
| Bodine Monet | "Tears like Rain" | Ashley Hicklin; Lukas Hällgren; Pele Loriano; Roxane Ischi |
| Floryan | "Scars" | Florian Rößler; Leif Bent; Rea Garvey |
| Galant | "Katze" | Mona Meiller; Paul-Aaron Wolf |
| Isaak | "Always on the Run" | Greg Taro; Isaak Guderian; Kevin Lehr; Leo Salminen |
| Leona | "Undream You" | Elsa Søllesvik; Leona Preuss; Maria Christensen; Simon Davis |
| Marie Reim | "Naiv" | Tim Peters |
| Max Mutzke | "Forever Strong" | Justin Balk; Max Mutzke; Sebastian Schubert; Simon Oslender |
| NinetyNine | "Love on a Budget" | Daniel Leon Schmidt; Henrik Menzel; Mirko Michalzik |
| Ryk | "Oh Boy" | Rick Jurthe |

===== Ich will zum ESC! =====
Ich will zum ESC! was a format developed by NDR and Hessischer Rundfunk (HR) to select one finalist for Eurovision Song Contest – Das deutsche Finale 2024. It consisted of five pre-recorded episodes, premiering on ARD Mediathek between 25 January and 1 February 2024 (later airing on Das Erste), and a live final, held on 8 February 2024 at the Kreuzberg Festival Hall in Berlin and hosted by Laura Karasek (airing on NDR Fernsehen and Das Erste). It saw fifteen artists being coached by Conchita Wurst (2014 Austrian representative and overall winner) and Rea Garvey, who in each episode chose which participants would move on to the next stage, with three qualifying for the final. There, they presented a newly-composed song and the winner was determined by a televoting round.

Episode 1 – Auditions: part 1 – 25 January 2024
| R/O | Artist | Song | Coaches' vote | | Result |
| R/O | Artist | Song | C.W. | R.G. | Result |
|---|---|---|---|---|---|
| 1 | Christos | "Be Yourself" | Yes | Yes | Team Conchita |
| 2 | Bibiane | "Toxic" | No | Yes | Team Rea |
| 3 | Apollson | "Love on the Brain" | No | No | Eliminated |
| 4 | Anne | "Don't Stop Me Now" | Yes | No | Team Conchita |
| 5 | Paul | "Out of Time" | No | Yes | Team Rea |
| 6 | Jamina | "Creep" | No | No | Eliminated |
| 7 | Esther | "Slave to the Rhythm" | —N/a (Note: Esther was allowed to give a second performance in episode 2.) | | |

Episode 2 – Auditions: part 2 – 25 January 2024
| R/O | Artist | Song | Coaches' vote | | Result |
| R/O | Artist | Song | C.W. | R.G. | Result |
|---|---|---|---|---|---|
| 1 | Esther | "What a Wonderful World" | No | Yes | Team Rea |
| 2 | Sophie | "Schön genug" | Yes | Yes | Team Conchita |
| 3 | Luca | "When I Was Your Man" | Yes | Yes | Team Conchita |
| 4 | Celina | "Physical" | No | No | Eliminated |
| 5 | Sven | "Beggin'" | Yes | No | Team Conchita |
| 6 | Marie | "Irgendwas bleibt" | No | No | Eliminated |
| 7 | Béranger | "Wild Drift" | No | Yes | Team Rea |
| 8 | Lyn | "Calm After the Storm" | No | No | Eliminated |
| 9 | Florian | "What Was I Made For?" | No | Yes | Team Rea |

Episode 3 – Vocal coaching – 25 January 2024
| R/O | Artists | Song | Coaches' vote (Note: Guest coaches (not voting): Yvonne Ambrée and Katrin Mickiewicz) | | Result |
| R/O | Artists | Song | C.W. | R.G. | Result |
|---|---|---|---|---|---|
| 1 | Christos | "Take Me to Church" | No | —N/a | Eliminated |
| 1 | Sven | "Take Me to Church" | Yes | —N/a | Advanced |
| 2 | Anne | "Time After Time" | Yes | —N/a | Advanced |
| 2 | Luca | "Time After Time" | Yes | —N/a | Advanced |
| 2 | Sophie | "Time After Time" | Yes | —N/a | Advanced |
| 3 | Florian | "Dancing on My Own" | — | Yes | Advanced |
| 3 | Bibiane | "Dancing on My Own" | — | Yes | Advanced |
| 4 | Esther | "You Get What You Give" | — | No | Eliminated |
| 4 | Béranger | "You Get What You Give" | — | Yes | Advanced |
| 4 | Paul | "You Get What You Give" | — | Yes | Advanced |

Episode 4 – Lip-sync challenge – 30 January 2024
| R/O | Artist | Song | Coaches' vote (Note: Guest coach (not voting): Nikeata Thompson) | | Result |
| R/O | Artist | Song | C.W. | R.G. | Result |
|---|---|---|---|---|---|
| 1 | Florian | "Can't Stop" | — | Yes | Advanced |
| 2 | Bibiane | "Running Up That Hill" | — | Yes | Advanced |
| 3 | Béranger | "Maniac" | — | No | Eliminated |
| 4 | Paul | "Sex on Fire" | — | Yes | Advanced |
| 5 | Luca | "Think About Things" | Yes | — | Advanced |
| 6 | Sophie | "Karma" | No | — | Eliminated |
| 7 | Sven | "Roller" | Yes | — | Advanced |
| 8 | Anne | "Wildberry Lillet" | Yes | — | Advanced |

Episode 5 – Songwriting challenge – 1 February 2024
| Artist | Coaches' vote | | Result |
| Artist | C.W. | R.G. | Result |
|---|---|---|---|
| Anne | Yes | — | Advanced |
| Bibiane | — | Yes | Advanced (Note: Bibiane Z was selected for the final, where she was set to perform "Walk You Home Safe". However, she was ultimately unable to attend the live show due to being ill and was thus forced to withdraw.) |
| Florian | — | Yes | Advanced |
| Luca | Yes | — | Advanced |
| Paul | —N/a | No | Eliminated |
| Sven | No | —N/a | Eliminated |

Live final – 8 February 2024
| R/O | Artist | Song | Public vote | | | | Place |
| R/O | Artist | Song | Phone | SMS | Online | Total | Place |
|---|---|---|---|---|---|---|---|
| 1 | Anne Im | "Yellow Brick Road" | 4,052 | 1,901 | 894 | 6,856 | 3 |
| 2 | Floryan | "Scars" | 6,132 | 2,165 | 1,095 | 9,392 | 1 |
| 3 | Luca M. Wefes | "Farben neuer Tage" | 5,121 | 2,517 | 1,113 | 8,771 | 2 |

==== Final ====
The final of Eurovision Song Contest – Das deutsche Finale 2024 took place on 16 February 2024 and saw nine contestants compete. The winner was selected by a 50/50 combination of votes from an international jury and a televote, following a similar pattern to the one used in the Eurovision Song Contest final: the two votings each determined a ranking whereby the entries were assigned 1–6, 8, 10 and 12 points. The international jury was composed of one panel for each of eight different countries, namely Austria, Croatia, Iceland, Lithuania, Spain, Sweden, Switzerland, and the United Kingdom. The show was attended by Conchita Wurst, Rea Garvey, Mary Roos (1972 and 1984 German Eurovision representative), Riccardo Simonetti, Florian Silbereisen, Alli Neumann and previous German representatives Lord of the Lost as guests.

Final – 16 February 2024
| R/O | Artist | Song | Jury | | Public vote | | | | | Total | Place |
| R/O | Artist | Song | Votes | Points | Phone | SMS | Online | Total | Points | Total | Place |
|---|---|---|---|---|---|---|---|---|---|---|---|
| 1 | NinetyNine | "Love on a Budget" | 37 | 3 | 12,051 | 2,707 | 3,676 | 18,434 | 3 | 6 | 7 |
| 2 | Leona | "Undream You" | 36 | 2 | 10,708 | 2,969 | 2,883 | 16,560 | 1 | 3 | 9 |
| 3 | Isaak | "Always on the Run" | 74 | 12 | 64,726 | 21,925 | 23,465 | 110,116 | 12 | 24 | 1 |
| 4 | Galant | "Katze" | 52 | 6 | 27,175 | 12,989 | 12,203 | 52,367 | 5 | 11 | 5 |
| 5 | Floryan | "Scars" | 8 | 1 | 11,637 | 3,499 | 2,257 | 17,393 | 2 | 3 | 8 |
| 6 | Bodine Monet | "Tears Like Rain" | 55 | 8 | 26,818 | 10,905 | 10,433 | 48,156 | 4 | 12 | 4 |
| 7 | Ryk | "Oh Boy" | 51 | 5 | 46,488 | 32,957 | 17,965 | 97,410 | 8 | 13 | 3 |
| 8 | Marie Reim | "Naiv" | 40 | 4 | 40,162 | 13,584 | 11,772 | 65,518 | 6 | 10 | 6 |
| 9 | Max Mutzke | "Forever Strong" | 55 | 10 | 72,473 | 18,443 | 16,156 | 107,072 | 10 | 20 | 2 |

Detailed international jury votes
| R/O | Song | Switzerland | Croatia | Spain | Lithuania | United Kingdom | Iceland | Austria | Sweden | Total |
| R/O | Song | Switzerland | Croatia | Spain | Lithuania | United Kingdom | Iceland | Austria | Sweden | Total |
|---|---|---|---|---|---|---|---|---|---|---|
| 1 | "Love on a Budget" | 3 | 3 | 5 | 5 | 10 | 6 | 2 | 3 | 37 |
| 2 | "Undream You" | 4 | 10 | 6 | 3 | 3 | 4 | 4 | 2 | 36 |
| 3 | "Always on the Run" | 10 | 6 | 8 | 8 | 12 | 8 | 12 | 10 | 74 |
| 4 | "Katze" | 2 | 5 | 10 | 10 | 2 | 12 | 3 | 8 | 52 |
| 5 | "Scars" | 1 | 1 | 1 | 1 | 1 | 1 | 1 | 1 | 8 |
| 6 | "Tears Like Rain" | 6 | 12 | 3 | 6 | 4 | 10 | 8 | 6 | 55 |
| 7 | "Oh Boy" | 12 | 4 | 2 | 4 | 6 | 5 | 6 | 12 | 51 |
| 8 | "Naiv" | 8 | 2 | 12 | 2 | 5 | 2 | 5 | 4 | 40 |
| 9 | "Forever Strong" | 5 | 8 | 4 | 12 | 8 | 3 | 10 | 5 | 55 |
International jury spokespersons
Switzerland – Luca Hänni; Croatia – Anja Cerar; Spain – Álvaro Soler; Lithuania – Ieva Narkutė; United Kingdom – Katrina Leskanich; Iceland – Rúnar Freyr Gíslason; Austria – Cesár Sampson; Sweden – Lina Hedlund

International jury members
| Country | Members |
|---|---|
| Austria | Christian Deix; Gabriela Horn; Peter Pansky; Bettina Ruprechter; Sasha Saedi |
| Croatia | Mia Dimšić; Denis Dumančić; Bojan Jambrošić; Monika Lelas Habanek; Branimir Mihaljević |
| Iceland | Einar Bárðarson; Helga Möller; Kjartan Guðbergsson; Kristján Gíslason; Regína Óskarsdóttir |
| Lithuania | Lauras Lučiūnas; Vytautas Lukošius; Ieva Narkutė; Darius Užkuraitis; Deivydas Zvonkus |
| Spain | Sophia Martin; Aaron Sáez Escolano; Marta Sánchez Gómez; Tony Sánchez-Ohlsson; Sergio Sastre Sainz |
| Switzerland | Chiara Dubey; Rico Fischer; Michael von der Heide; Lisa Oribasi; Georg Schlunegger |
| Sweden | Filip Adamo; Lina Hedlund; Henrik Johnsson; Maria Marcus; Rennie Mirro |
| United Kingdom | Mark De-Lisser; Rokhsan Heydari; Adam Hunter; George Ure; Pete Watson |

=== Preparation and promotion ===
Shortly after the national final, it was announced that "Always on the Run" would undergo a minor lyrical change in accordance with the contest's regulations prohibiting vulgar language. As part of the promotion of his participation in the contest, Isaak attended the PrePartyES in Madrid on 30 March 2024, the London Eurovision Party on 7 April 2024 and the Eurovision in Concert event in Amsterdam on 13 April 2024. In addition, he performed at the Eurovision Village in Malmö on 9 May 2024.

== At Eurovision ==
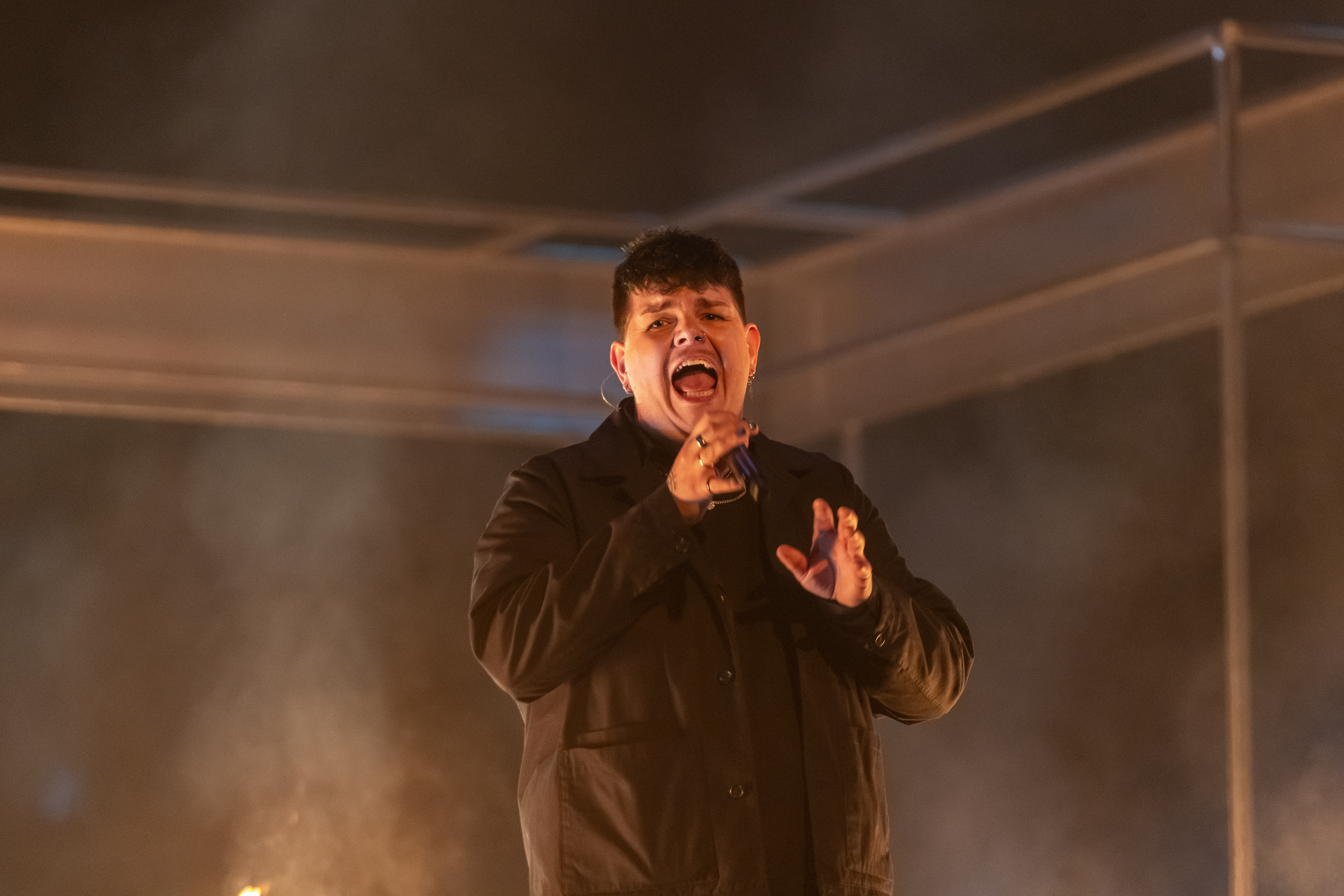
Isaak during a rehearsal before the final.

The Eurovision Song Contest 2024 took place at the Malmö Arena in Malmö, Sweden, and consisted of two semi-finals held on the respective dates of 7 and 9 May and the final on 11 May 2024. All nations with the exceptions of the host country and the "Big Five" (France, Germany, Italy, Spain and the United Kingdom) were required to qualify from one of two semi-finals in order to compete in the final; the top ten countries from each semi-final progressed to the final. As a member of the "Big Five", Germany automatically qualifies to compete in the final on 11 May 2024, but is also required to broadcast and vote in one of the two semi-finals. This was decided via a draw held during the semi-final allocation draw on 30 January 2024, when it was announced that Germany would be voting in the first semi-final. Despite being an automatic qualifier for the final, the German entry was also performed during the semi-final. On 4 May 2024, a draw was held to determine which half of the final each "Big Five" country would perform in; Germany drew to perform in the first half of the show.

ARD broadcast the semi-finals on One and the final on Das Erste, as well as all shows online via ARD Mediathek and Eurovision.de; commentary is provided by Thorsten Schorn, replacing historical commentator Peter Urban. During the contest's week, ARD also aired the special program Alles Eurovision, hosted by Alina Stiegler and Constantin Zöller, providing insight on the competition. In a joint meeting held in Munich in September 2023, ARD and German-language broadcasters ORF for Austria and SRF for Switzerland renewed their plans to cooperate on the broadcast of Eurovision-themed programmes ESC – Der Countdown and ESC – Die Aftershow in 2024, as they did for the 2023 contest; the shows were hosted by Barbara Schöneberger. In addition, as part of the Eurovision programming, ARD through its station WDR cooperated with DR and SVT alongside other EBU member broadcasters – namely the BBC, ČT, ERR, France Télévisions, NRK, NTR, RÚV, VRT and Yle – to produce and air a documentary titled ABBA – Against the Odds, on the occasion of the 50th anniversary of Sweden's first victory at the contest with "Waterloo" by ABBA.

=== Performance ===
Isaak took part in technical rehearsals on 2 and 4 May, followed by dress rehearsals on 10 and 11 May. His performance of "Always on the Run" at the contest was directed by Dan Shipton and saw four dancers joining him in stage as well as the usage of pyrotechnics.

=== Final ===
On 4 May 2024, a draw was held to determine which half of the final each "Big Five" country would perform in; Germany drew to perform in the first half of the show. Germany performed in position 3, following the entry from Ukraine and before the entry from Luxembourg. Isaak once again took part in dress rehearsals on 10 and 11 May before the final, including the jury final where the professional juries cast their final votes before the live show on 11 May. He performed a repeat of his semi-final performance during the final on 11 May. Germany placed twelfth in the final, scoring 117 points; 18 points from the public televoting and 99 points from the juries.

=== Voting ===
Below is a breakdown of points awarded to and by Germany in the first semi-final and in the final. Voting during the three shows involved each country awarding sets of points from 1-8, 10 and 12: one from their professional jury and the other from televoting in the final vote, while the semi-final vote was based entirely on the vote of the public. The German jury consisted of Mirko Bogojević, Nicola Keute, Mona Meiller, Florian Schrödter, and Ireen Sheer, who represented Luxembourg in the 1974 and 1985 contests and Germany in the 1978 contest. In the final, Germany placed 12th with 117 points; the country's highest placing since 2018. Over the course of the contest, Germany awarded its 12 points to Croatia in the first semi-final, and to Sweden (jury) and Israel (televote) in the final.

NDR appointed Ina Müller as its spokesperson to announce the German jury's votes in the final.

==== Points awarded to Germany ====
Points awarded to Germany (Final)
| Score | Televote | Jury |
|---|---|---|
| 12 points | | |
| 10 points | | Israel |
| 8 points | Israel | Belgium; France |
| 7 points | | Ukraine |
| 6 points | | Ireland; Norway |
| 5 points | | Czechia; Greece; Netherlands; Spain |
| 4 points | Austria | Estonia; Italy; Latvia; Luxembourg; Poland |
| 3 points | Switzerland | Finland |
| 2 points | Iceland | Georgia; Iceland; Portugal; United Kingdom |
| 1 point | Luxembourg | Armenia; Lithuania; San Marino |

==== Points awarded by Germany ====
Points awarded by Germany (Semi-final 1)
| Score | Televote |
|---|---|
| 12 points | Croatia |
| 10 points | Ukraine |
| 8 points | Lithuania |
| 7 points | Luxembourg |
| 6 points | Ireland |
| 5 points | Serbia |
| 4 points | Australia |
| 3 points | Finland |
| 2 points | Poland |
| 1 point | Portugal |

Points awarded by Germany (Final)
| Score | Televote | Jury |
|---|---|---|
| 12 points | Israel | Sweden |
| 10 points | Croatia | France |
| 8 points | Ukraine | Israel |
| 7 points | Switzerland | Armenia |
| 6 points | France | Croatia |
| 5 points | Greece | Switzerland |
| 4 points | Armenia | Ukraine |
| 3 points | Italy | Luxembourg |
| 2 points | Lithuania | Italy |
| 1 point | Ireland | Lithuania |

==== Detailed voting results ====
Each participating broadcaster assembles a five-member jury panel consisting of music industry professionals who are citizens of the country they represent. Each jury, and individual jury member, is required to meet a strict set of criteria regarding professional background, as well as diversity in gender and age. No member of a national jury was permitted to be related in any way to any of the competing acts in such a way that they cannot vote impartially and independently. The individual rankings of each jury member as well as the nation's televoting results were released shortly after the grand final.

The following members comprised the German jury:

- Mirko Bogojević (Das Bo)
- Nicola Keute
- Mona Meiller
- Florian Schrödter
- Ireen Sheer

Detailed voting results from Germany (Semi-final 1)
| R/O | Country | Televote | |
| R/O | Country | Rank | Points |
|---|---|---|---|
| 01 | Cyprus | 12 | |
| 02 | Serbia | 6 | 5 |
| 03 | Lithuania | 3 | 8 |
| 04 | Ireland | 5 | 6 |
| 05 | Ukraine | 2 | 10 |
| 06 | Poland | 9 | 2 |
| 07 | Croatia | 1 | 12 |
| 08 | Iceland | 14 | |
| 09 | Slovenia | 11 | |
| 10 | Finland | 8 | 3 |
| 11 | Moldova | 15 | |
| 12 | Azerbaijan | 13 | |
| 13 | Australia | 7 | 4 |
| 14 | Portugal | 10 | 1 |
| 15 | Luxembourg | 4 | 7 |

Detailed voting results from Germany (Final)
| R/O | Country | Jury | | | | | | | Televote | |
| R/O | Country | Juror A | Juror B | Juror C | Juror D | Juror E | Rank | Points | Rank | Points |
|---|---|---|---|---|---|---|---|---|---|---|
| 01 | Sweden | 1 | 7 | 7 | 2 | 10 | 1 | 12 | 18 | |
| 02 | Ukraine | 18 | 2 | 12 | 4 | 11 | 7 | 4 | 3 | 8 |
| 03 | Germany | | | | | | | | | |
| 04 | Luxembourg | 4 | 15 | 4 | 7 | 12 | 8 | 3 | 20 | |
| ~~05~~ | ~~Netherlands~~ ‡ (Note: The Netherlands was disqualified prior to the final.) | ~~11~~ | ~~23~~ | ~~15~~ | ~~22~~ | ~~3~~ | ~~15~~ | | N/A | |
| 06 | Israel | 3 | 11 | 20 | 5 | 2 | 3 | 8 | 1 | 12 |
| 07 | Lithuania | 14 | 8 | 8 | 3 | 7 | 10 | 1 | 9 | 2 |
| 08 | Spain | 22 | 20 | 23 | 24 | 16 | 24 | | 15 | |
| 09 | Estonia | 24 | 25 | 22 | 19 | 23 | 25 | | 13 | |
| 10 | Ireland | 25 | 1 | 25 | 23 | 8 | 12 | | 10 | 1 |
| 11 | Latvia | 8 | 13 | 16 | 13 | 24 | 17 | | 16 | |
| 12 | Greece | 10 | 18 | 14 | 18 | 18 | 18 | | 6 | 5 |
| 13 | United Kingdom | 2 | 16 | 9 | 12 | 21 | 13 | | 23 | |
| 14 | Norway | 19 | 10 | 21 | 21 | 20 | 20 | | 22 | |
| 15 | Italy | 16 | 14 | 5 | 1 | 19 | 9 | 2 | 8 | 3 |
| 16 | Serbia | 20 | 12 | 11 | 16 | 22 | 19 | | 14 | |
| 17 | Finland | 5 | 24 | 19 | 25 | 5 | 14 | | 12 | |
| 18 | Portugal | 12 | 5 | 3 | 8 | 15 | 11 | | 21 | |
| 19 | Armenia | 13 | 4 | 1 | 10 | 17 | 4 | 7 | 7 | 4 |
| 20 | Cyprus | 6 | 22 | 18 | 11 | 9 | 16 | | 17 | |
| 21 | Switzerland | 17 | 3 | 6 | 9 | 6 | 6 | 5 | 4 | 7 |
| 22 | Slovenia | 23 | 17 | 17 | 15 | 25 | 23 | | 24 | |
| 23 | Croatia | 7 | 9 | 10 | 14 | 1 | 5 | 6 | 2 | 10 |
| 24 | Georgia | 21 | 21 | 13 | 20 | 13 | 21 | | 19 | |
| 25 | France | 9 | 6 | 2 | 6 | 4 | 2 | 10 | 5 | 6 |
| 26 | Austria | 15 | 19 | 24 | 17 | 14 | 22 | | 11 | |
