= Germany in the Eurovision Song Contest 2023 =

- Eurovision Song Contest 2023
- Participating broadcaster: ARD (Note: Arbeitsgemeinschaft der öffentlich-rechtlichen Rundfunkanstalten der Bundesrepublik Deutschland) – Norddeutscher Rundfunk (NDR)
- Country: Germany
- Selection process: Unser Lied für Liverpool
- Selection date: 3 March 2023

Competing entry
- Song: "Blood & Glitter"
- Artist: Lord of the Lost
- Songwriters: Anthony James Brown; Chris Harms; Pi Stoffers; Rupert Keplinger

Placement
- Final result: 26th, 18 points

Participation chronology

Germany was represented at the Eurovision Song Contest 2023 with the song "Blood & Glitter" performed by Lord of the Lost. The German broadcaster ARD, in collaboration with Norddeutscher Rundfunk (NDR), organised the national final Unser Lied für Liverpool in order to select the German entry for the 2023 contest. The national final took place on 3 March 2023 and featured eight competing acts with the winner being selected through international jury voting and public voting.

== Background ==
Prior to the 2023 contest, Germany has participated in the Eurovision Song Contest sixty-four times since its debut as one of seven countries to take part in 1956. Germany has won the contest on two occasions: in 1982 with the song "Ein bißchen Frieden" performed by Nicole and in 2010 with the song "Satellite" performed by Lena. Germany, to this point, has been noted for having competed in the contest more than any other country; they have competed in every contest since the first edition in 1956 except for the 1996 contest when the nation was eliminated in a pre-contest elimination round. In 2022, "Rockstars" performed by Malik Harris placed twenty-fifth (last) out of twenty-five competing songs with 6 points.

== Before Eurovision ==
=== Unser Lied für Liverpool ===
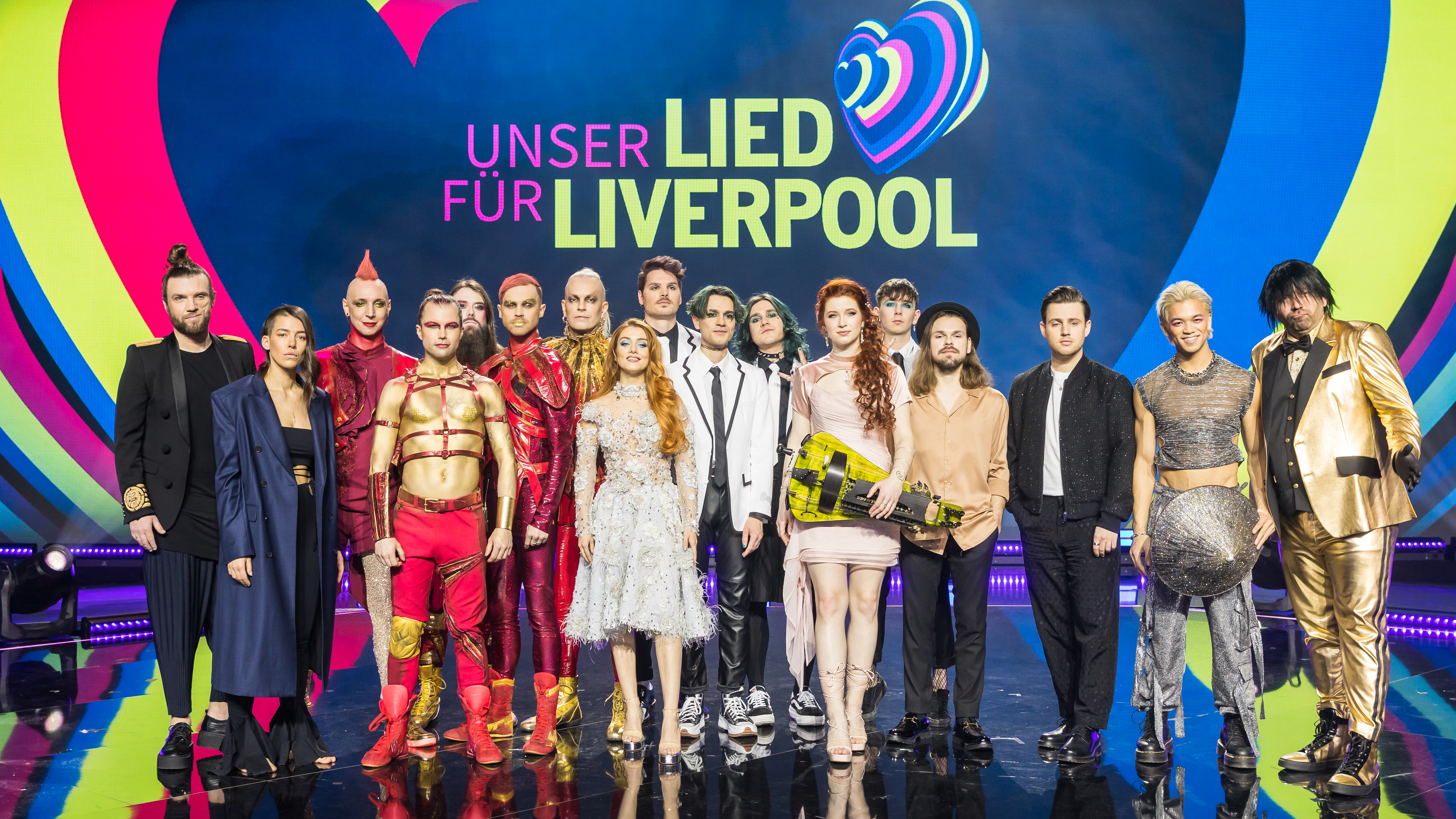
The participants of Unser Lied für Liverpool

Unser Lied für Liverpool (English: Our Song for Liverpool) was the competition that selected Germany's entry for the Eurovision Song Contest 2023. The competition took place on 3 March 2023 at the MMC Studios in Cologne, and was hosted by Barbara Schöneberger. The show was broadcast on Das Erste as well as online via the broadcaster's Eurovision Song Contest website eurovision.de and the ARD-Mediathek platform.

==== Competing entries ====
Interested artists and composers were able to submit their entries for the competition between 9 November 2022 and 28 November 2022. Artists and composers were also able to upload their entries to TikTok with the hashtag #UnserLiedFürLiverpool. By the end of the process, it was announced that 548 submissions were received by NDR. The eight competing entries for the national final were selected over three stages. In the first stage, entries were shortlisted for the second stage by a panel consisting of members of the ARD Eurovision team and representatives of eurovision.de, ARD radio channels and the production company Bildergarten. The second stage involved an international expert panel that provided feedback in regards to the shortlisted entries for the ARD Eurovision team to select the eight entries in the third stage. The participating acts were announced on 27 January 2023. An additional six entries were selected by the ARD Eurovision team for a TikTok selection from over 900 submissions uploaded on the platform, with an online voing being held via TikTok app to determine the act advancing to the final, with the winner revealed during the broadcast of Alles Eurovision on 4 February.

On 3 March, the band Frida Gold withdrew their entry after their lead singer Alina Süggeler fell ill. The group had already missed several rehearsals prior to their withdrawal.

TikTok wildcard selection – 27 January–3 February 2023
Artist	Song	Songwriter(s)	Percentage	Place
Betül	"Heaven"	Kevin Anyaeji, Shelley Segal, Wayne Wilkins	3%	4
From Fall to Spring	"Draw the Line"	Benedikt Veith, León Arend, Lukas Wilhelm, Philip Wilhelm, Seb Monzel, Simon Triem	28%	2
Ikke Hüftgold	"Lied mit gutem Text"	Dominik De León, Florian Apfl, Matthias Distel, Patrick Liegl	52%	1
Jona	"10/10"	Jona, Skender Durakovac, Tom Ulrichs, Wieland Stahnecker	14%	3
Leslie Clio	"Free Again"	Leslie Clio	1%	6
Mitchy & André Katawazi, NashUp	"Summertime"	Alexander Deleon, Chord Overstreet, Michael Katawazi, Nash Overstreet	2%	5

Artist	Song	Songwriter(s)
Anica Russo	"Once Upon a Dream"	Anica Russo, Mendi Moon, Philip Sesay, Rami Bakieh
~~Frida Gold~~	~~"Alle Frauen in mir sind müde"~~	~~Alina Süggeler, Andreas Weizel~~
Ikke Hüftgold	"Lied mit gutem Text"	Dominik De León, Florian Apfl, Matthias Distel, Patrick Liegl
Lonely Spring	"Misfit"	Julian Fuchs, Manuel Schrottenbaum, Matthias Angerer, Phil Sunday, Simon Fuchs
Lord of the Lost	"Blood & Glitter"	Anthony J. Brown, Chris Harms, Pi Stoffers, Rupert Keplinger
Patty Gurdy	"Melodies of Hope"	Johannes Braun, Patricia Büchler
René Miller	"Concrete Heart"	Mike Needle, René Miller
Trong	"Dare to Be Different"	Elsa Søllesvik, Sasha Rangas, Stefan van Leijsen, Trong Hieu Nguyen
Will Church	"Hold On"	Eddie Jonsson, Megan Ashworth, Patrick Liegl, Will Church

==== Final ====
The final took place on 3 March 2023. The winner was selected by a 50/50 combination of eight international jury groups from Switzerland, the Netherlands, Finland, Spain, Lithuania, Ukraine, Austria and the United Kingdom, as well as public voting. Each jury group distributed their points as follows: 1, 2, 3, 4, 6, 8, 10 and 12 points. The public vote was based on the percentage of votes each song achieved through the following voting methods: online, telephone, and SMS. For example, if a song gains 10% of the viewer vote, then that entry would be awarded 10% of 368 points rounded to the nearest integer: 37 points. The online voting window was open from 24 February to 3 March 2023, after which telephone and SMS voting were used during the show. Frida Gold had originally been scheduled to perform eighth prior to their withdrawal; their votes received during the online voting window were subsequently nullified, and Lord of the Lost, who was scheduled to perform after Frida Gold, retained their running order number. In addition to the performances of the competing entries, The BossHoss with Ilse DeLange, Florian Silbereisen, Riccardo Simonetti and 2022 German Eurovision entrant Malik Harris performed as interval acts.

Final – 3 March 2023
R/O	Artist	Song	Jury	Televote					Total	Place
R/O	Artist	Song	Jury	Phone	SMS	Online	Total	Points	Total	Place
1	Trong	"Dare to Be Different"	52	12,261	7,360	8,736	28,357	19	71	4
2	René Miller	"Concrete Heart"	54	4,651	2,025	4,809	11,485	8	62	7
3	Anica Russo	"Once Upon a Dream"	57	5,533	4,041	2,608	12,182	8	65	6
4	Lonely Spring	"Misfit"	40	12,144	8,489	23,539	44,172	30	70	5
5	Will Church	"Hold On"	90	19,758	6,961	3,457	30,176	21	111	3
6	Patty Gurdy	"Melodies of Hope"	22	18,327	9,464	21,797	49,588	34	56	8
7	Ikke Hüftgold	"Lied mit gutem Text"	10	46,460	26,281	75,821	148,562	101	111	2
9	Lord of the Lost	"Blood & Glitter"	43	79,520	68,677	66,178	214,375	146	189	1

Detailed international jury votes
R/O	Song	Switzerland	Netherlands	Finland	Spain	Lithuania	Ukraine	Austria	United Kingdom	Total
R/O	Song	Switzerland	Netherlands	Finland	Spain	Lithuania	Ukraine	Austria	United Kingdom	Total
1	"Dare to Be Different"	4	12	2	6	8	6	4	10	52
2	"Concrete Heart"	10	8	4	10	3	8	3	8	54
3	"Once Upon a Dream"	8	4	10	2	10	10	10	3	57
4	"Misfit"	2	6	6	4	6	4	6	6	40
5	"Hold On"	12	10	8	12	12	12	12	12	90
6	"Melodies of Hope"	3	1	3	8	2	2	2	1	22
7	"Lied mit gutem Text"	1	2	1	1	1	1	1	2	10
9	"Blood & Glitter"	6	3	12	3	4	3	8	4	43
International jury spokespersons
Switzerland – Gjon's Tears; Netherlands – Marijke Amado; Finland – Joel Hokka; Spain – Barei; Lithuania – Vaidotas Valiukevičius; Ukraine – Jamala; Austria – Cesár Sampson; United Kingdom – SuRie

International jury members
Country	Members
Austria	Gabriela Horn; Sasha Saedi; Eleonora Vardanian; Peter Pansky; Cesár Sampson
Finland	Samuli Väänänen; Iisa Pajula; Anna-Maria Borgar; Annastiina Paavola; Joel Hokka
Lithuania	Ieva Narkutė; Ramūnas Zilnys; Raminta Naujanytė; Audrius Giržadas; Vaidotas Valiukevičius
Netherlands	Gordon Groothedde; Erica Suzanne Groeneveld; Marjolein Dekkers; Florent Luyckx; Marijke Amado
Spain	Luís Miguel Palao; Aaron Saez; Daniel Borrego; Eva Maria Mora; Barei
Switzerland	Lisa Oribasi; Sandro Dietrich; Chiara Dubey; Yves Schifferle; Gjon's Tears
Ukraine	Igor Kondratiuk; German Nenov; Kateryna Sereda; Oksana Skybinska; Jamala
United Kingdom	Pete Watson; Rokhsan Heydari; George Ure; Adam Hunter; SuRie

== At Eurovision ==
According to Eurovision rules, all nations with the exceptions of the host country and the "Big Five" (France, Germany, Italy, Spain and the United Kingdom) are required to qualify from one of two semi-finals in order to compete in the final; the top ten countries from each semi-final progress to the final. As a member of the "Big Five", Germany automatically qualified to compete in the final on 13 May 2023. In addition to its participation in the final, Germany was also required to broadcast and vote in one of the two semi-finals. This was decided via a draw held during the semi-final allocation draw on 31 January 2023, when it was announced that Germany would be voting in the first semi-final.

In Germany, all three shows were broadcast live on One, with the final also broadcast live on Das Erste, with commentary provided by Peter Urban. This was Urban's 25th contest as commentator for German television, providing commentary on ARD every year since 1997, and 2023 marked his final year as commentator. The contest's final was also broadcast live via satellite by Deutsche Welle, on DW Deutsch in Asia and DW Deutsch+ in North America.

The broadcast of semi-final 1 on One reached an average of 590,000 television viewers, while the broadcast of semi-final 2 reached an average of 620,000 viewers. The broadcast of the final reached an average of 7.45 million viewers on Das Erste, which marked an increase of 900,000 viewers compared to the previous two contests and an overall market share of 35.8%, with 53.4% market share for those between the ages of 14 and 49. An additional 510,000 watched the broadcast on One, bringing the overall total market share across both channels to 38.4%, with an almost 58% market share among the 14 to 49 year old bracket and a 66.9% share among 14 to 29 year olds. The 2023 contest gained the highest market share among youth audiences in Germany since the 2011 contest, which was organised in Germany and held in Düsseldorf.

=== Voting ===
==== Points awarded to Germany ====
Points awarded to Germany (Final)
Score	Televote	Jury
12 points		
10 points		
8 points		
7 points		
6 points	Austria	
5 points	Finland	
4 points	Switzerland	
3 points		
2 points		Iceland
1 point		Czech Republic

==== Points awarded by Germany ====
Points awarded by Germany (Semi-final)
Score	Televote
12 points	Finland
10 points	Croatia
8 points	Switzerland
7 points	Czech Republic
6 points	Moldova
5 points	Portugal
4 points	Sweden
3 points	Norway
2 points	Israel
1 point	Latvia

Points awarded by Germany (Final)
Score	Televote	Jury
12 points	Finland	Sweden
10 points	Italy	Estonia
8 points	Albania	Australia
7 points	Ukraine	Spain
6 points	Croatia	Norway
5 points	Norway	Czech Republic
4 points	Poland	Italy
3 points	Switzerland	Serbia
2 points	Belgium	Austria
1 point	Sweden	Lithuania

==== Detailed voting results ====
The following members comprised the German jury:

- Arne Surendra Ghosh
- Kai Tölke
- Alina Eva Süggeler
- Anica Russo
- Karin Ilse Überall (Katja Ebstein)

Detailed voting results from Germany (Semi-final 1)
R/O	Country	Televote	
R/O	Country	Rank	Points
01	Norway	8	3
02	Malta	12	
03	Serbia	11	
04	Latvia	10	1
05	Portugal	6	5
06	Ireland	13	
07	Croatia	2	10
08	Switzerland	3	8
09	Israel	9	2
10	Moldova	5	6
11	Sweden	7	4
12	Azerbaijan	15	
13	Czech Republic	4	7
14	Netherlands	14	
15	Finland	1	12

Detailed voting results from Germany (Final)
R/O	Country	Jury							Televote	
R/O	Country	Juror 1	Juror 2	Juror 3	Juror 4	Juror 5	Rank	Points	Rank	Points
01	Austria	5	14	7	7	20	9	2	12	
02	Portugal	6	17	18	16	7	12		23	
03	Switzerland	7	10	22	11	16	15		8	3
04	Poland	22	23	17	19	25	24		7	4
05	Serbia	24	6	25	2	18	8	3	19	
06	France	13	15	11	4	14	11		18	
07	Cyprus	14	18	13	18	10	19		17	
08	Spain	12	4	5	12	6	4	7	24	
09	Sweden	1	1	1	1	1	1	12	10	1
10	Albania	9	9	19	21	23	18		3	8
11	Italy	8	19	8	10	3	7	4	2	10
12	Estonia	2	2	3	3	2	2	10	21	
13	Finland	11	21	6	24	15	16		1	12
14	Czech Republic	15	3	9	8	8	6	5	16	
15	Australia	3	5	4	9	4	3	8	14	
16	Belgium	16	20	16	15	17	21		9	2
17	Armenia	10	13	10	14	19	17		22	
18	Moldova	23	24	24	25	11	22		11	
19	Ukraine	25	7	23	5	21	13		4	7
20	Norway	19	11	2	13	5	5	6	6	5
21	Germany									
22	Lithuania	4	8	14	17	9	10	1	15	
23	Israel	20	12	12	6	12	14		13	
24	Slovenia	21	22	15	23	22	23		20	
25	Croatia	18	25	21	22	24	25		5	6
26	United Kingdom	17	16	20	20	13	20		25	
