= Always on the Run =

Always on the Run may refer to:

- "Always on the Run" (Lenny Kravitz song), 1991
- "Always on the Run" (Isaak song), 2024
