= Lord of the Lost =

German dark rock band

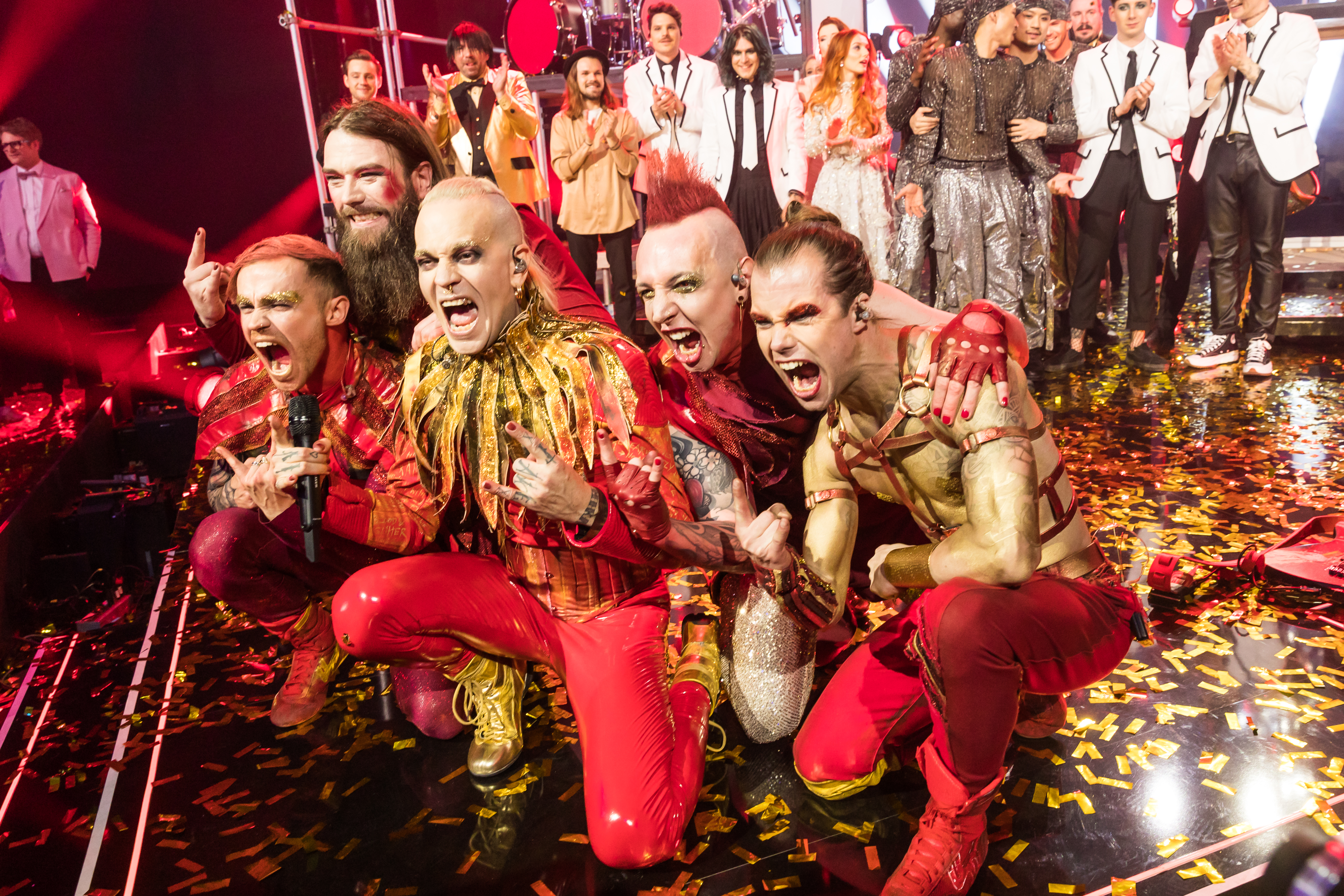
- Lord of the Lost at Unser Lied für Liverpool in 2023. L–R: Pi Stoffers, Niklas Kahl, Chris Harms, Gared Dirge, Class Grenayde.

Background information
- Origin: Hamburg, Germany
- Genres: Gothic rock; gothic metal; industrial rock; glam rock
- Years active: 2007–present
- Labels: Out of Line, Napalm
- Members: Chris "Lord" Harms; Gared Dirge; Niklas Kahl; Benji Mundigler; Bengt Jaeschke
- Past members: Sensai; Sebsta Lindström; Any Wayst; Pi "π" Stoffers; Bo Six; Class Grenayde; Disco; Tobias Mertens
- Website: lordofthelost.de

Lord of the Lost is a German rock band from Hamburg, formed by singer and frontman Chris Harms. They represented Germany in the Eurovision Song Contest 2023 with the song "Blood & Glitter".

== History ==
Lord of the Lost was founded in mid-2007 by Chris Harms as a solo project. While working on the initial songs and publishing them on MySpace, Harms received a lot of positive reception and realized that he would require a full band to play them live. He recruited other musicians from his friends in the Hamburg music scene to form the band and begin working on the first album. Harms originally called the project Lord, but changed the name of the band to Lord of the Lost to avoid possible name disputes with Lordi and The Lords. Before Lord of the Lost, Harms was a singer and guitarist of the rock band Philiae (1999–2004), a guitarist and second singer with the glam metal band The Pleasures (2004–2007), as well as a musician on various projects like Big Boy and Unterart.

The debut single Dry the Rain was released in 2009 and the debut album Fears was released in 2010 with the independent label Out of Line. While recording the second album Antagony Lord of the Lost went on an extended tour through 2010 which included international shows and festivals such as the Wave-Gotik-Treffen, the Wacken Open Air and the M'era Luna Festival.

In spring 2011, the band released Sex on Legs as the first single from their second album, Antagony. The album, considered their first concept album, was released shortly thereafter. Lord of the Lost toured in support of the album with the band Mono Inc. on their Viva Hades tour.

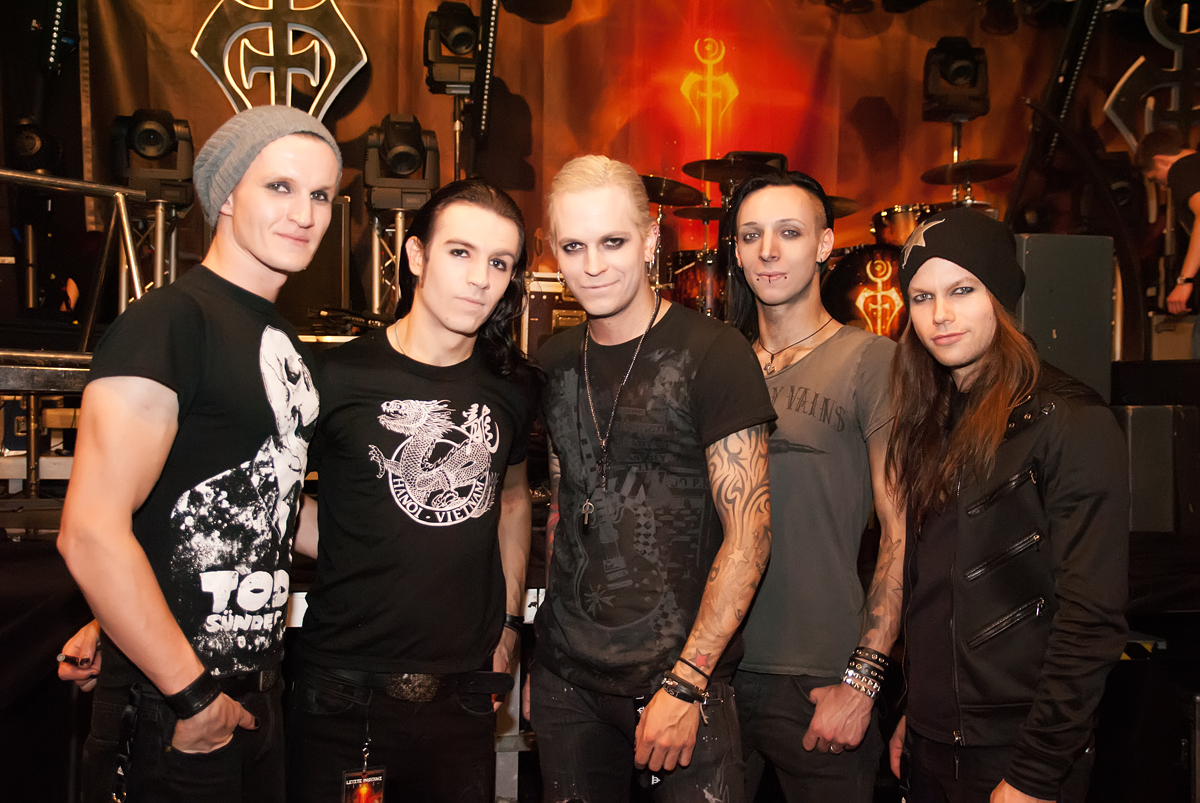
Lord of the Lost in 2012

In summer 2012, Lord of the Lost released their third album Die Tomorrow. Just before the release, the band began working on their fourth album From the Flame into the Fire. In October 2012, Lord of the Lost opened for Letzte Instanz on their Ewig Tour. Lord of the Lost started touring again in the spring of 2013 co-headlining on the Darkness Kills tour with Unzucht, and in September kicked off the We Are the Lost tour together with Lost Area. In October 2013, Lord of the Lost appeared as part of the Gothic Meets Klassik at the Leipzig Gewandhaus with the Zielona Gòra Symphony Orchestra.

In February 2014, drummer Christian Schellhorn left the band and was replaced by Tobias Mertens. In March 2014, the band played their first US tour, which was financed by crowdfunding. Within two months fans and sponsors raised US$12,775, surpassing the original goal of $10,000.

In March 2015, Lord of the Lost released the pure acoustic album Swan Songs, which reached number 34 on the GfK Entertainment Charts. The live performances for the album took place on the Out of Line Weekender in Berlin in the same month.

In 2015, Lord of the Lost released the EP Full Metal Whore. The tour for the album used the motto "Make Love Make War" and was supported by the bands Darkhaus, Eyes Shut Tight, Vlad in Tears, and Erdling. In December 2015, they released A Night to Remember – Live Acoustic in Hamburg, the DVD and live CD from the acoustic tour during the previous spring.

The first single "The Love of God" from the album Empyrean was released in May 2016. This was followed by the band's first major European tour Make Europe Great Again (M.E.G.A.) with Combichrist, Filter, and (at the German concerts) Rabia Sorda. Empyrean was published at the end of July 2016 and is the second concept album from the band.

The band followed Empyrean with their open air concert premiere as The Lord of the Lost Ensemble, an acoustic-classical band supported by classical musicians and the former drummer Christian "Disco" Schellhorn.

In December 2016, guitarist Bo Six announced that he would be leaving the band for professional and private reasons. In early January 2017, the band announced their new guitarist π (Pi).

In July 2017, Tobias Mertens announced that, for private and professional reasons, he would be taking a time-out from Lord of the Lost. Niklas Kahl has stepped in as drummer for live performances.

Lord of the Lost performed with KMFDM on the United Kingdom leg of KMFDM's "Hell Yeah" tour with Inertia during September 2017. The band planned to join KMFDM on the United States portion of the "Hell Yeah" tour with ohGr starting in October 2017. Chris Harms and π were to be playing guitar on stage with KMFDM during the tour, in addition to their Lord of the Lost set. Lord of the Lost was forced to withdraw from KMFDM's United States tour when they were not issued visas by the U.S. government.

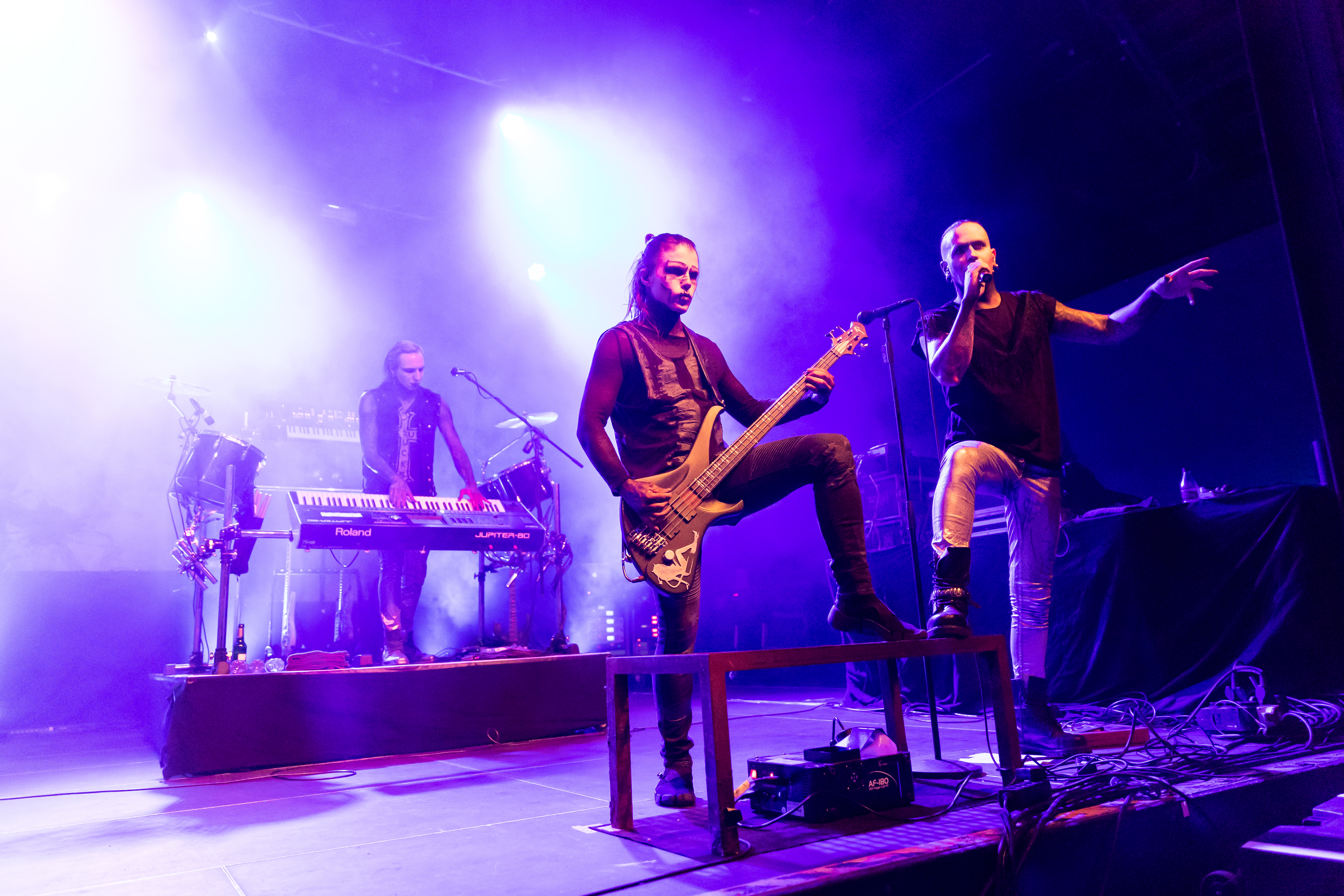
Lord of the Lost at Black Castle Festival 2018

Iron Maiden's Steve Harris personally picked Lord of the Lost to support Iron Maiden on their 2020 European leg of the Legacy of the Beast World Tour but due to the COVID-19 pandemic restrictions, the tour had to be cancelled. The tour was rescheduled and in 2022, Lord of the Lost played as a support act in 17 European cities on Iron Maiden's Legacy of the Beast world tour and gained much recognition. Iron Maiden subsequently renewed this successful collaboration for the European leg of the 2023 The Future Past world tour.

In December 2022, Lord of the Lost surprised their fans by releasing their new studio album "Blood and Glitter" months before it was scheduled to be released. The album, in spite of the last minute release and lack of pre-promotion, managed to hit Nr. 1 on the official German Music Charts.

With the song "Blood and Glitter", Lord of the Lost won Unser Lied für Liverpool, and thus represented Germany in the Eurovision Song Contest 2023. They placed 26th out of 26 entrants in the final, with a score of 18 points.

In August 2024 they played a 70-minute set at the German music festival Summer Breeze Open Air.

In July 2026, Class Grenayde and Pi Stoffers announced they would depart ways with the band.

== Musical style and influences ==
Lord of the Lost produces music influenced by several genres including heavy metal, glam rock, industrial music, and classical music. In interviews with the magazine Orkus and the website Subexistance, Chris Harms has cited bands and musicians such as Rammstein, Nine Inch Nails, Marilyn Manson and Lady Gaga as some of the many performers that he listens to and is influenced by. AllMusic described Lord of the Lost as "a sinister goth-metal and dark industrial rock outfit".

== Reception ==
Although it has not always been received as highly innovative, the debut album Fears received an overall positive critique by the music press. The music Magazine Sonic Seducer praised not only the "pleasant deep promising vocals" but also the "dark, melodramatic moments" and described the album as "dark mélange of music styles which give the album a fresh and great variety". In Zillo the debut has been described as "not really original or ground-breaking" but it has been praised for its "hard and unconditional songs". Orkus, however, wrote that they have waited a long time for an album "so interesting and rich in variety". Metal.de described the album as "absolutely okay" but suggested to listen to some songs before buying the album because it might be "too hard for some, and too soft for others".

== Members ==
Members of the band often, but not always, adopt stage names which appear in the credits for the band. If known, the artist's given name is listed after the stage name in parentheses.

Current members

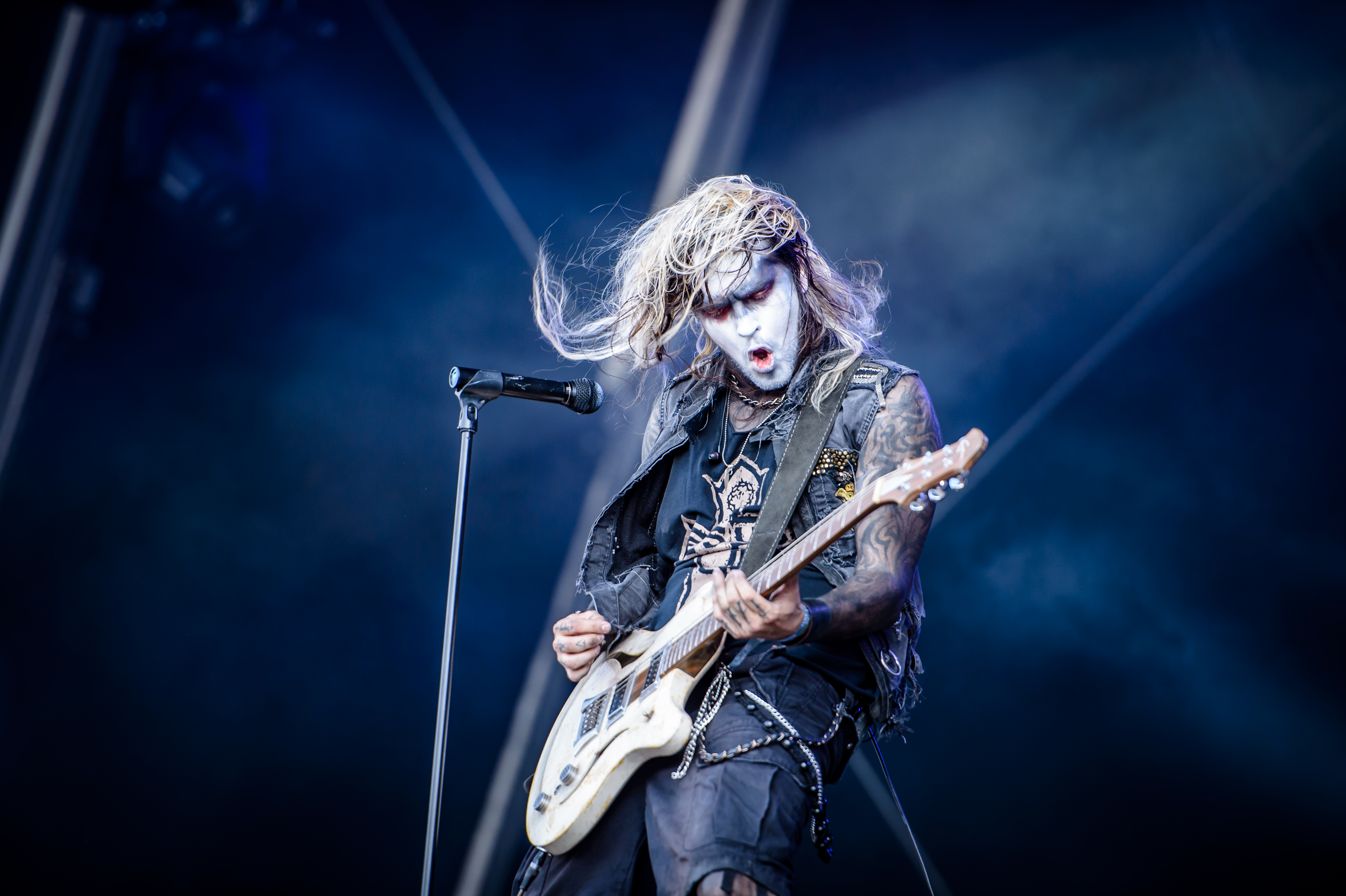
Chris "The Lord" Harms at Rockharz Open Air 2017

- Chris "The Lord" Harms – lead vocals, guitars, cello (2007–present)
- Gerrit "Gared Dirge" Heinemann – piano, keyboards, percussion, guitars, theremin (2010–present)
- Niklas Kahl – drums (2017–present)
- Benjamin "Benji" Mundigler – guitars, keyboards, backing vocals (2024–present)
- Bengt Jaeschke - bass (2026-present)

Previous members

- Stefan "Sensai" Ehrhardt – guitars (2008–2010)
- Sebastian "Sebsta Lindström" Makowski – guitars (2008–2011)
- Anika "Any" Wayst – drums (2008–2011)
- Borislav "Bo Six" Crnogorac – guitars (2009–2016)
- Christian "Disco" Schellhorn – drums (2012–2014)
- Tobias Mertens – drums (2014–2017)
- Klaas "Class Grenayde" Helmecke – bass, backing vocals (2008–2026)
- Pi "π" Stoffers – guitars, backing vocals (2017–2026)

Touring members

- Dom. R. Crey - bass (2026)

Timeline

== Discography ==
=== Studio albums ===
List of studio albums with selected details and chart positions
Title	Album details	Peak chart positions
Title	Album details	GER
Fears	Released: 19 February 2010; Label: Out of Line (OUT 399)	54
Antagony	Release date: 1 April 2011; Label: Out of Line (OUT 475)	—
Die Tomorrow	Released: 31 August 2012; Label: Out of Line (OUT 568)	33
From the Flame Into the Fire	Released: 23 May 2014; Label: Out of Line (OUT 674)	18
Empyrean	Released: 29 July 2016; Label: Out of Line (OUT 823)	9
Thornstar	Released: 3 August 2018; Label: Napalm Records (NAP 786)	6
Judas	Released: 2 June 2021; Label: Napalm Records (NAP 989)	2
Blood & Glitter	Released: 30 December 2022; Label: Napalm Records (NAP 1164)	1
Weapons of Mass Seduction	Released: 29 December 2023; Label: Napalm Records	2
Opvs Noir Vol. 1	Released: 8 August 2025; Label: Napalm Records	3
Opvs Noir Vol. 2	Released: 12 December 2025; Label: Napalm Records	13
Opvs Noir Vol. 3	Released: 10 April 2026; Label: Napalm Records	7

=== Orchestra albums ===
List of orchestra albums with selected details and chart positions
Title	Album details	Peak chart positions
Title	Album details	GER
Swan Songs	Released: March 2015; Label: Out of Line (OUT 724)	34
Swan Symphonies Instrumental Soundtrack Version	Released: April 2015; Label: Out of Line	—
Swan Songs II	Released: 6 October 2017; Label: Napalm Records (NAP 740)	35
Swan Songs III	Released: August 2020; Label: Napalm Records (NAP 909)	25
Swan Symphonies III Instrumental Soundtrack Version	Released: November 2020; Label: Napalm Records	—

=== Live albums ===
List of live albums with selected details and chart positions
Title	Album details	Peak chart positions
Title	Album details	GER
We Give Our Hearts – Live Auf St. Pauli	Released: August 2013; Label: Out of Line (OUT 620)	93
A Night to Remember – Live & Acoustic in Hamburg	Released: 4 December 2015; Label: Out of Line (OUT 763)	—
Confession – Live at Christuskirche	Released: November 2018; Label: Napalm Records (NAP 740)	54
Festival of Love (Stream Concert)	Released: 2022; Label: Lord of the Lost	—

=== Compilation albums ===
List of compilation albums with selected details and chart positions
Title	Album details	Peak chart positions
Title	Album details	GER
Till Death Us Do Part: The Best Of	Released: August 2019; Label: Out of Line (OUT 1013)	20
Till Death Us Do Part: Rarities & Remixes	Released: 2019; Label: Out of Line	—

=== Extended plays ===
List of EPs with selected details
Title	EP details
Beside & Beyond	Released: February 2012; Label: Out of Line (OUT 530)
MMXIV	Released: 2014; Label: Out of Line; Note: 3-track EP exclusive for Sonic Seducer
Full Metal Whore	Released: July 2015; Label: Out of Line (OUT 743)
Eisheilige Nacht 2016 (with Subway to Sally)	Released: 2016; Label: Sonic Seducer; Note: Limited release
Ruins	Released: 2018; Label: Sonic Seducer; Note: Limited release
Swan Songs III – Piano EP	Released: 2020; Label: Sonic Seducer; Note: Limited release
The Heartbeat of the Devil	Released: 2022; Label: Napalm Records

=== Singles ===
- 2009: "Dry the Rain"
- 2011: "Sex on Legs"
- 2012: "Die Tomorrow"
- 2013: "See You Soon" incl. "Von Anfang an" (with Holly Loose of Letzte Instanz)
- 2014: "Afterlife"
- 2014: "La Bomba"
- 2014: "Six Feet Underground"
- 2016: "The Love of God"
- 2017: "Waiting for You to Die"
- 2017: "Lighthouse"
- 2017: "The Broken Ones"
- 2018: "On This Rock I Will Build My Church"
- 2018: "Morgana"
- 2019: "Loreley"
- 2019: "Voodoo Doll"
- 2020: "A One Ton Heart"
- 2020: "A Splintered Mind"
- 2020: "Dying on the Moon" (featuring Joy Frost)
- 2021: "The Death of All Colours"
- 2021: "Priest"
- 2021: "For They Know Not What They Do"
- 2022: "Not My Enemy"
- 2022: "The Heartbeat of the Devil"
- 2022: "Blood & Glitter"
- 2023: "Absolute Attitude"
- 2023: "Cha Cha Cha" (Käärijä cover)
- 2023: "Shock to the System"
- 2023: "(I Just) Died in Your Arms"
- 2023: "Unstoppable"
- 2024: "Drag Me to Hell" (live at W:O:A)
- 2024: "Ruins" (live at W:O:A)
- 2024: "Stronger Without You – Alt universe" (Remix)
- 2024: "Blood & Glitter" (live at W:O:A)
- 2024: "Lords of Fyre"
- 2024: "Out Of Breath"
- 2025: "My Sanctuary"
- 2025: "I Will Die in It"
- 2025: "Ghosts"
- 2025: "Bazaar Bizarre"
- 2025: "Light Can Only Shine in the Darkness" (featuring Within Temptation)
- 2025: "Raveyard" (featuring Käärijä)
- 2026: "I Hate People" (featuring Wednesday 13)
- 2026: "Es Gibt Nur Einen Gott"

==== Charted singles ====
List of charted singles, with selected chart positions
Title	Year	Peak chart positions	Album
Title	Year	LTU	Album
"Blood & Glitter"	2022	69	Blood & Gliter

=== DVDs ===
- 2012: Black to the Roots
- 2014: One Night – Lord of the Lost & The Zielona Góra Symphony Orchestra – Live in Leipzig
- 2015: A Night to Remember – Live Acoustic in Hamburg

=== Exclusive sampler contributions ===
- 2011: "Do You Wanna Die Without a Scar" (on the Sonic Seducer sampler Cold Hands Seduction Vol. 117)
- 2011: "Death Doesn't Kill You But I Do" (on the Out of Line sampler Awake the Machines, Vol. 7)

=== Remixes and recordings with other artists ===
- 2011: "Temple of Love" with Latexxx Teens
- 2012: "Kannst du mich seh'n" (Remix) for Staubkind
- 2012: "Deine Zeit Läuft Ab" (St. Pauli Symphonic Version by Lord of the Lost) for Unzucht
- 2012: "Eye M the Blacksheep" (Remix by Chris Harms and Corvin Bahn) for Rabia Sorda
- 2012: "Eisblumen" on the Anniversary Sampler for the 20th anniversary of Subway to Sally
- 2012: "Deep Inside" (Remix) for Fragile Child
- 2013: "Perfect Day" with A Life Divided
- 2013: "Bitte Schlag Mich" (shattered by Lord of the Lost) for Ost+Front
- 2013: "Pandora's Box" (Cover) for Solitary Experiments
- 2013: "In My Darkest Hour" with Mono Inc. on their Nimmermehr tour album
- 2014: "Für Immer" Remix for Subway to Sally (on the Sonic Seducer Sampler Medieval Special Vol. XII Issue 03/2014)
- 2014: "Krieger" with Blutengel on their Black Symphonies (An Orchestral Journey) Ltd. Edition
- 2014: "Die Erde Brennt" Remix Joachim Witt on the Neumond Ltd. Edition
- 2014: "Sonne, Mond & Todesstern" (Remix by Lord of the Lost) for Ost+Front
- 2015: "Der Zeitdieb" Remix for Tanzwut
- 2015: "Der Luftschiffharpunist" Remix for Coppelius
- 2015: "Satans Fall" cover for Saltatio Mortis
- 2015: "All the Things You Say" Remix for Solar Fake
- 2015: "This Misery" with Meinhard
- 2016: "Devil or Angel" with Rocksin
- 2016: "Ein Wort fliegt wie ein Stein" with Unzucht on their "Neuntöter" deluxe edition
- 2016: "MRS. Strong" with 5th Avenue
- 2016: "Freak Parade" with Hell Boulevard"
- 2016: "Sexschuss" remix for Heldmaschine
- 2016: "Children of the Dark" with Tilo Wolff, Joachim Witt and Mono Inc.
- 2018: "1000 Seelen" with Joachim Witt
- 2018: "I Love the Way You Say My Name" with Scarlet Dorn
- 2019: "Europa" with Oomph!
- 2019: "Island" with Subway to Sally
- 2019: "We're All Dead" with Lolita KompleX
- 2019: "Magst du Mittelalter?" With Vogelfrey
- 2020: "Modern Prometheus" with Pyogenesis
- 2021: "Kiss of the Cobra King" with Powerwolf on their Call of the Wild Ltd. Edition
- 2022: "In Einsamkeit" with Joachim Witt
- 2022: "Mortals" with Sündenrausch
- 2022: "Holding On" with Auger
- 2022: "Die Sonne scheint" with Reliquiae
- 2022: "Childhood" with Dawn of Destiny
- 2022: "Take Me Back" with Psycholies
- 2022: "Never Love" with Corlyx

=== Music videos ===
- 2009: "Dry the Rain"
- 2010: "Last Words"
- 2011: "Sex on Legs"
- 2011: "Prison"
- 2012: "Beyond Beautiful"
- 2012: "Die Tomorrow"
- 2013: "See You Soon"
- 2013: "Credo"
- 2014: "Afterlife"
- 2014: "La Bomba"
- 2014: "Six Feet Underground"
- 2014: "Kingdom Come"
- 2015: "Lost in a Heartbeat"
- 2015: "Full Metal Whore"
- 2016: "The Love of God"
- 2016: "Drag Me to Hell"
- 2016: "In Silence"
- 2017: "Raining Stars"
- 2017: "Waiting for You to Die" (lyric video)
- 2017: "Lighthouse"
- 2017: "The Broken Ones"
- 2017: "My Better Me" (lyric video)
- 2018: "On This Rock I Will Build My Church"
- 2018: "Morgana"
- 2018: "Haythor" (lyric video)
- 2018: "Black Halo"
- 2018: "Forevermore"
- 2019: "Loreley"
- 2019: "Voodoo Doll"
- 2019: "Till Death Us Do Part"
- 2019: "Ruins"
- 2020: "Under the Sun"
- 2020: "We Were Young"
- 2020: "A One Ton Heart"
- 2020: "A Splintered Mind"
- 2020: "Dying on the Moon" (feat. Joy Frost)
- 2020: "Schwarz tot Gold" (feat. Swiss und die Andern)
- 2021: "The Death of All Colours"
- 2021: "Priest"
- 2021: "For They Know Not What They Do"
- 2021: "The Gospel of Judas"
- 2021: "Born with a Broken Heart"
- 2021: "Viva Vendetta"
- 2021: "My Constellation"
- 2022: "Not My Enemy"
- 2022: "The Heartbeat of the Devil"
- 2022: "Children of the Damned" ('Iron Maiden' cover)
- 2022: "A World Where We Belong"
- 2022: "Blood & Glitter"
- 2023: "Leave Your Hate in the Comments"
- 2023: "Leaving the Planet Earth"
- 2023: "Absolute Attitude"
- 2023: "Forever Lost"
- 2023: "The Curtain Falls"
- 2023: "Noitulover" (lyric video)
- 2023: "Reset the Preset"
- 2023: "Dead End"
- 2023: "Destruction Manual"
- 2023: "No Respect for Disrespect"
- 2023: "One Last Song"
- 2023: "Shock to the System" ('Billy Idol' cover)
- 2023: "The Look" ('Roxette' cover) feat. Blümchen
- 2024: "The Future of a Past Life" (feat. Marcus Bischoff)
- 2024: "Lords of Fyre" (feat. Feuerschwanz)
- 2025: "My Sanctuary"
- 2025: "I Will Die in It"
- 2025: "Ghosts" (feat. Tina Guo)
- 2025: "Light Can Only Shine in the Darkness" (feat. Within Temptation)
- 2025: "Bazaar Bizarre"
- 2025: "Raveyard" (feat. Käärijä)
- 2025: "One of Us Will Be Next"
- 2025: "Would You Walk with Me Through Hell?" (feat. Infected Rain)
- 2025: "Winter's Dying Heart"
- 2026: "I'm a Diamond" (feat. Saltatio Mortis)
- 2026: "La Vie Est Hell" (feat. Hannes Braun)
- 2026: "My Funeral"
- 2026: "I Hate People" (feat. Wednesday 13)
- 2026: "The Days of Our Lives"

Preceded by Malik Harris with "Rockstars"	Germany in the Eurovision Song Contest; 2023	Succeeded by Isaak with "Always on the Run"
