= Leo Jupiter =

Finnish record producer, DJ and video artist

Background information
- Birth name: Leo Salminen
- Genres: Pop, electronic, indie
- Occupation(s): Record producer, DJ
- Instrument: Piano
- Years active: 2011–present
- Labels: Next Era, Elements Music

Leo Salminen, known professionally as Leo Jupiter, is a Finnish record producer, DJ and video artist. He is known for his multi-platinum certified productions for artists such as Reino Nordin and Teflon Brothers.

== Career as a record producer ==
Leo Salminen has worked with a vast group of international artists such as Laidback Luke, Wyclef Jean and LLuHan. In 2016, Salminen signed a publishing deal with the Finnish publisher Elements Music. Since then, Leo has found success in the Finnish market, by producing multi-platinum certified records such as "Hubba Bubba" by Teflon Brothers and Reino Nordin's "Antaudun", which reached number one position in Finland in 2017 in terms of airplay and streams. In addition, Leo has worked with numerous notable Finnish artists such as Kasmir, Elastinen, Robin and Alex Mattson.

== Early years as a DJ ==
Leo's music career started back in 2011 as an active member of the Finnish DJ community. Leo later joined the Heavyweight DJ's collective that contributed to bringing EDM culture to the Finnish mainstream. After touring Finland for a few years, Leo's producer career caught wind as he was signed to Laidback Luke's Next Era publishing in 2013. Leo also DJ'd for a Finnish pop artist Kasmir, but eventually started to concentrate in producing records.

== Miscellaneous ==
Leo is also a video artist and has created visuals for other Finnish musicians like Pyhimys. Moreover, he also plays the piano as his main instrument.

== Discography ==
=== Songwriting and production credits ===
Songwriting and production credits
Year	Title	Peak chart positions	Album	Credits	Artist	Certifications
Year	Title	FI	Album	Credits	Artist	Certifications
2016	"Forget You"	17	Non-album single	Co-writer / Producer	Alex Mattson	IFPI FI: Gold
2016	"Hubba Bubba"	2	Circus	Co-writer / Producer	Teflon Brothers	IFPI FI: 3× Platinum
2017	"Antaudun"	1	Antaudun	Co-writer / Producer	Reino Nordin	IFPI FI: 3× Platinum
2017	"Kosketa"	13	Antaudun	Co-writer / Producer	Reino Nordin	IFPI FI: Platinum
2017	"Puhu Vaan"	18	Antaudun	Co-writer / Producer	Reino Nordin	IFPI FI: Platinum
2017	"Ihmeeni"	—	Non-album single	Co-writer / Producer	Reino Nordin	IFPI FI: Gold
2017	"Good Kids"	76	Non-album single	Co-writer / Producer	Alex Mattson	—
2018	"Another Sucker"	—	Sad Bangers	Co-writer / Producer	LCMDF	—
2024	"Always on the Run"	—	—	Co-writer / Producer	Isaak	—
