= Marie Reim =

German schlager singer

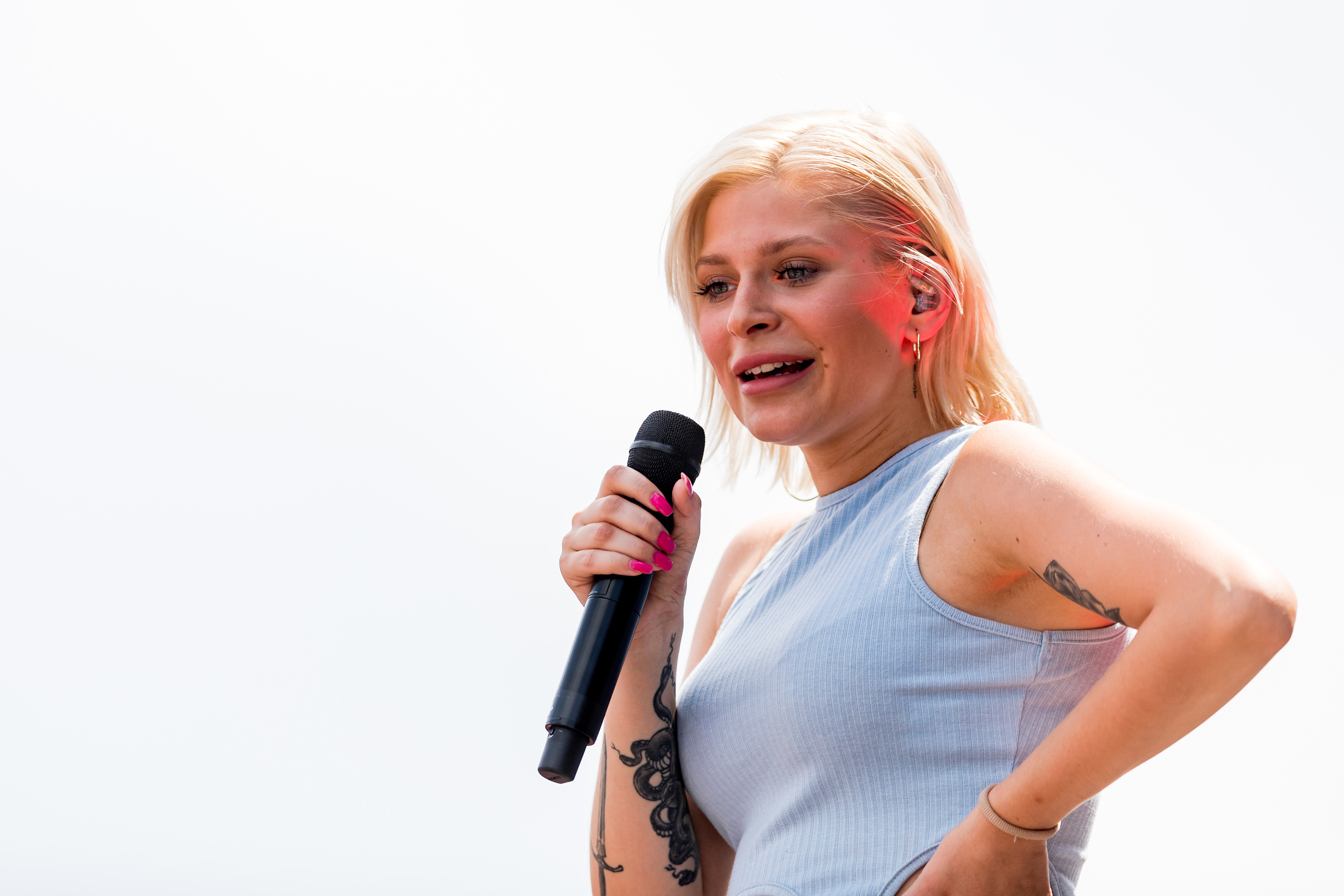
- Reim in 2022

Background information
- Born: Marie-Louise Oberloher; 8 May 2000 (age 26); Cologne, Germany
- Genres: Schlager
- Occupation: Singer

Marie-Louise Oberlohe (born 8 May 2000), known professionally as Marie Reim, is a German schlager singer.

== Early life ==
Reim was born on 8 May 2000, the daughter of pop singers Michelle and Matthias Reim. At that time, Michelle's real last name was Oberloher, which she had kept from her first marriage. Marie grew up mainly in Cologne and moved out of her parents' house at the age of 15. She speaks Dutch, having lived and attended school in Best, Netherlands for a year.

== Career ==
In 2012, Reim had her first television appearance with her mother on Florian Silbereisen's show Das Herbstfest der Überraschungen and presented the song Gib nicht auf. Three years later she sang the song Zieh vor dir selber den Hut on the show 150 Jahre Schlager. In 2016, she was on stage with her mother at the Schlagernacht of the year in the Lanxess Arena in Cologne. At the beginning of 2017, she accompanied her mother on tour and sang a song with her at every concert.

In January 2018, Reim signed a record deal with Ariola. In February 2020 she released her first single SOS. The song was written by Tim Peters, Werner Petersburg and Alexander Scholz, who had already worked with their parents. The title was produced by Silverjam. Her debut album 14 Phases was released in June 2020, followed by several television appearances. In September 2020 she had her first live appearance at the Waldbühne Rügen.

Reim took part in the German preliminary round for the Eurovision Song Contest 2024 with the song "Naiv", ultimately coming sixth.

== Discography ==
=== Studio albums ===
- 2020: 14 Phasen
- 2022: Bist du dafür bereit?

=== Singles ===
- 2020: SOS
- 2020: Weil das Mädels so machen
- 2021: Sonne (Anstandslos & Durchgeknallt Remix)
- 2021: Ich bin so verliebt
- 2021: Oh Santa
- 2022: Ich hab dich durchschaut
- 2022: Auf dem Weg ins Paradies
- 2022: Das mach ich ohne dich
- 2023: Jemand träumt von dir (with Tim Peters)
- 2024: Naiv
