= Malik Harris =

German-American singer (born 1997)

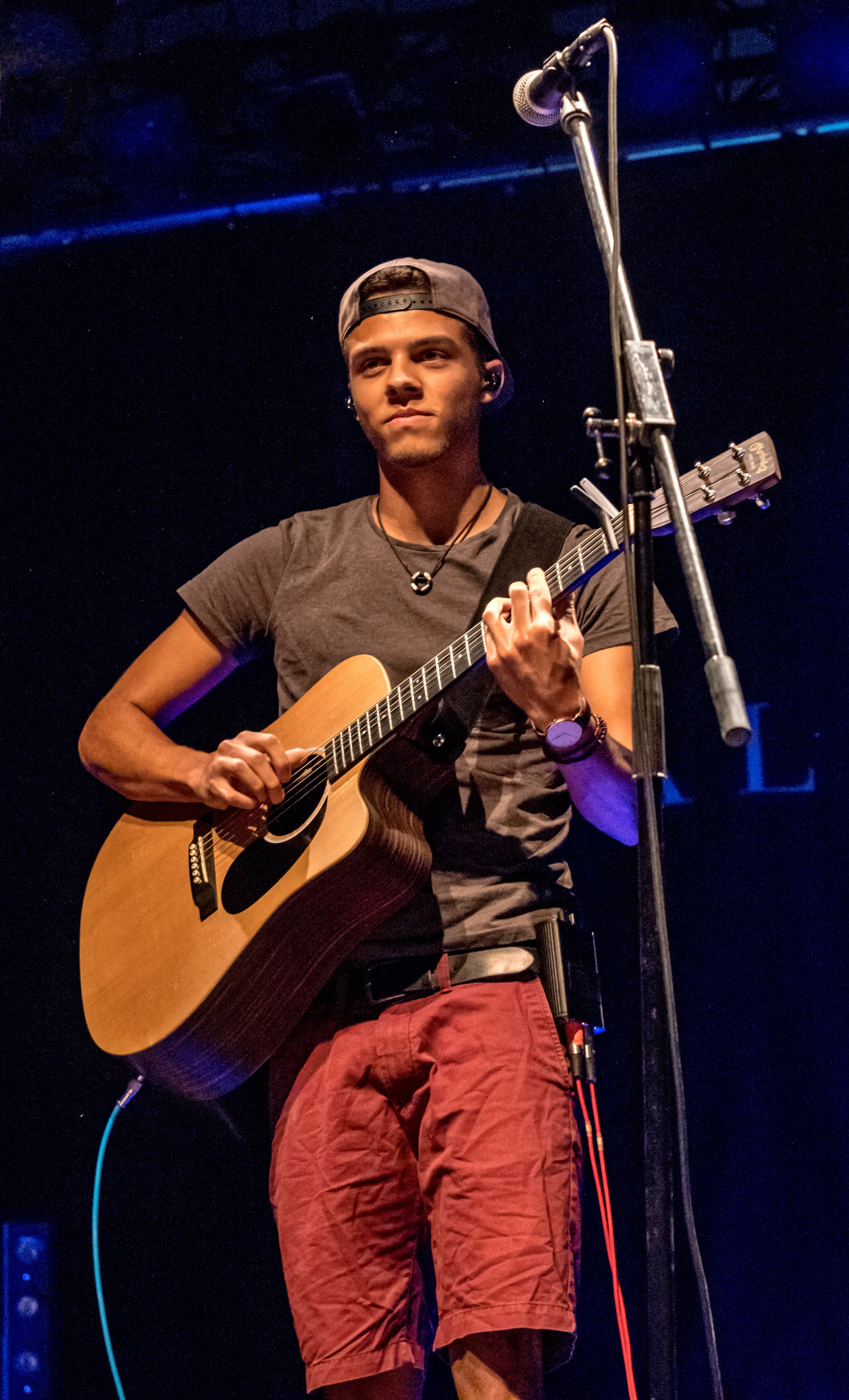
- Harris in 2018

Background information
- Born: 27 August 1997 (age 29); Landsberg am Lech, Germany
- Origin: Germany
- Occupations: Singer; Model
- Years active: 2019–present

Malik Justin Harris (born 27 August 1997) is a German-American singer, songwriter, multi-instrumentalist and rapper. He is the first ever German-American artist to spend a week on a Times Square billboard in New York City in 2020. He represented Germany in the Eurovision Song Contest 2022 with the song "Rockstars" and finished in last place with 6 points before the song was certified Gold in Germany in 2023.

== Early life ==
Harris was born in Landsberg am Lech on 27 August 1997. His father is Ricky Harris, a Germany-based American television presenter and actor from Detroit. At the age of 13, Harris got into music by making covers of songs with his guitar.

== Career ==
=== 2022: Eurovision Song Contest 2022 ===
Harris took part in the contest Germany 12 Points to become Germany's representative for the Eurovision Song Contest 2022. Harris made it to the final casting round held in Berlin in January 2022 and was announced as one of six finalists on 10 February 2022.

The televised final took place on 4 March 2022. The winner was selected through public voting, including options for landline, SMS and online voting. For the online vote, users were able to vote via the official websites of the nine ARD radio channels between 28 February 2022 and 4 March 2022. Harris won the final by a 23 points margin. At the grand final of Eurovision, he finished in last place with 6 points, second worst result after 2015.

== Discography ==
=== Albums ===
- Anonymous Colonist (2021)
- Plain Sights (2025)

=== EP ===
- Like That Again (2019)

=== Singles ===
- "Say the Name" (2018)
- "Welcome to the Rumble" (2019)
- "Like That Again" (2019)
- "Home" (2019)
- "Crawling" (2020)
- "Faith" (2020)
- "When We've Arrived" (2020)
- "Bangin' on My Drum" (2021)
- "Dance" (2021)
- "Time for Wonder" (2021)
- "Rockstars" (2022)
- "Dreamer" (2023)
- "Up" (2023)
- "Sticks & Stones" (2023)
- "Heavy Rain" (2024)
- "Better Man" (2025)
- "Daydreaming" (2025)
- "LAWIYA" (2025)
- "lie to me" (2026)
- "easy" (2026)

=== Guest contributions ===
- "Dust" (Cosby featuring Malik Harris) (2018)
- "Better Days" (as part of WIER) (2022)
- "Enchanté "(Younotus & Willy William featuring Malik Harris & Minelli) (2022)
- "WHO CARES" (Mi Casa featuring Malik Harris) (2024)

Preceded by Jendrik with "I Don't Feel Hate"	Germany in the Eurovision Song Contest; 2022	Succeeded by Lord of the Lost with "Blood & Glitter"
