= Isaak (singer) =

German singer (born 1996)

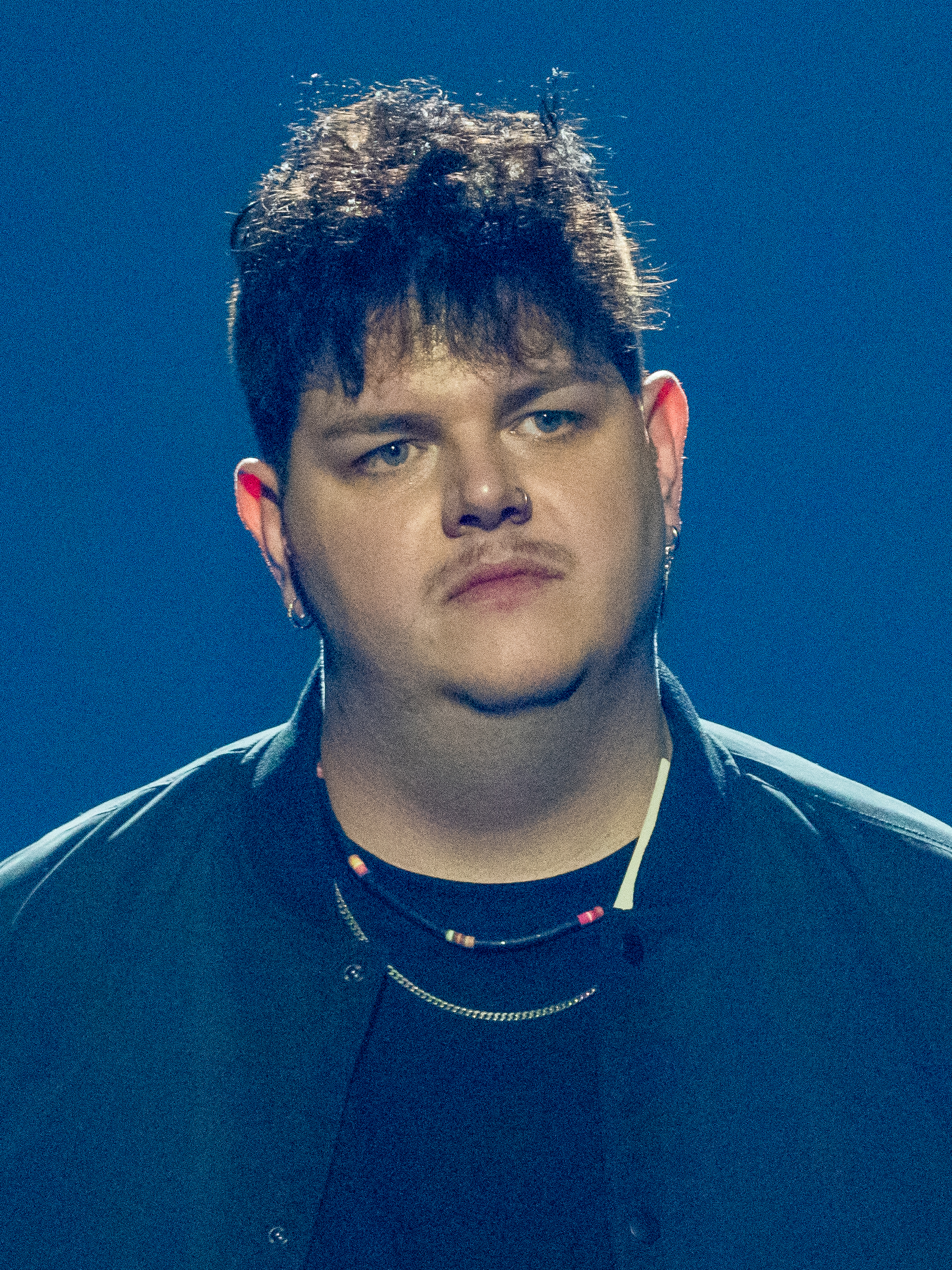
- Guderian in 2024

Background information
- Born: Isaak Guderian; 31 January 1995 (age 31); Minden, North Rhine-Westphalia, Germany
- Occupation: Singer

Isaak Guderian (German pronunciation: [ˈiːza.a(ː)k ɡuˈdeːʁi.an, ˈiːzaːk -]; born 31 January 1995), known mononymously as Isaak, is a German singer. He represented Germany in the Eurovision Song Contest 2024 with the song "Always on the Run". At the contest, he placed 12th with 117 points.

== Early and personal life ==
Guderian was born in 1995 to an Icelandic mother and a German father and grew up in Porta Westfalica, North Rhine-Westphalia. He currently lives in Espelkamp with his wife Loreen and two children.

== Career ==
Guderian began his musical career as a street musician, subsequently forming a band. In 2011, he took part in the TV talent show X Factor with a version of the Oasis hit "Wonderwall".

At 18, Guderian founded his own company for organising local and alternative musical events. In 2020, during the COVID-19 pandemic, he started composing music, and in 2021 he won Show Your Talent, marking his breakthrough. Guderian took part in the German national final for the Eurovision Song Contest 2024 with the song "Always on the Run", ultimately winning the right to represent the country at the contest.

== Discography ==
=== Extended plays ===
Title	Details
Would I Be Yours?	Released: 11 April 2025; Label: A Good Kid; Formats: Digital download, streaming

=== Singles ===
Title	Year	Peak chart positions				Album or EP
Title	Year	GER	AUT	LTU	SWE Heat.	Album or EP
"Too Late"	2020	—	—	—	—	Non-album singles
"Sober"	2020	—	—	—	—	Non-album singles
"One Life"	2021	—	—	—	—	Non-album singles
"Shelter"	2021	—	—	—	—	Non-album singles
"Free"	2021	—	—	—	—	Non-album singles
"Impact"	2021	—	—	—	—	Non-album singles
"Water to the Seed"	2021	—	—	—	—	Non-album singles
"Finally"	2021	—	—	—	—	Non-album singles
"Baby Steps" (with David Puentez)	2022	—	—	—	—	Non-album singles
"Home"	2022	—	—	—	—	Non-album singles
"Postcard"	2023	—	—	—	—	Non-album singles
"Always on the Run"	2024	22	69	21	4	Non-album singles
"Never the Same"	2024	—	—	—	—	Non-album singles
"Silent Night"	2024	—	—	—	—	Non-album singles
"Happy Tears"	2025	—	—	—	—	Non-album singles
"I Don't Know"	2025	—	—	—	—	Would I Be Yours?
"Paper Plane"	2025	—	—	— (Note: "Paper Plane" did not enter the AGATA Singlų Top 100, but peaked at number 43 on the TopHit Lithuanian Airplay.)	—	Non-album single
"—" denotes a recording that did not chart or was not released in that territory.

== Notes ==
Awards and achievements
Preceded by Lord of the Lost with "Blood & Glitter"	Germany in the Eurovision Song Contest; 2024	Succeeded by Abor & Tynna with "Baller"
