= Germany in the Eurovision Song Contest 2022 =

- Eurovision Song Contest 2022
- Participating broadcaster: ARD (Note: Arbeitsgemeinschaft der öffentlich-rechtlichen Rundfunkanstalten der Bundesrepublik Deutschland) – Norddeutscher Rundfunk (NDR)
- Country: Germany
- Selection process: Germany 12 Points
- Selection date: 4 March 2022

Competing entry
- Song: "Rockstars"
- Artist: Malik Harris
- Songwriters: Malik Harris; Marie Kobylka; Robin Karow

Placement
- Final result: 25th, 6 points

Participation chronology

Germany was represented at the Eurovision Song Contest 2022 with the song "Rockstars" performed by Malik Harris. The German entry for the 2022 contest was selected through the national final Germany 12 Points, organised by the German broadcaster ARD in collaboration with Norddeutscher Rundfunk (NDR). The national final took place on 4 March 2022 and featured six competing acts with the winner being selected through online radio voting and public voting.

== Background ==
Prior to the 2022 contest, Germany has participated in the Eurovision Song Contest sixty-four times since its debut as one of seven countries to take part in 1956. Germany has won the contest on two occasions: in 1982 with the song "Ein bißchen Frieden" performed by Nicole and in 2010 with the song "Satellite" performed by Lena. Germany, to this point, has been noted for having competed in the contest more than any other country; they have competed in every contest since the first edition in 1956 except for the 1996 contest when the nation was eliminated in a pre-contest elimination round. In 2021, the German entry "I Don't Feel Hate" performed by Jendrik placed twenty-fifth out of twenty-six competing songs scoring 3 points.

The German national broadcaster, ARD, broadcasts the event within Germany and delegates the selection of the nation's entry to the regional broadcaster Norddeutscher Rundfunk (NDR). NDR confirmed that Germany would participate in the 2022 Eurovision Song Contest on 19 March 2021. Between 2013 and 2019, NDR set up national finals with several artists to choose both the song and performer to compete at Eurovision for Germany, while an internal selection was organised in 2020 and 2021. On 3 November 2021, the broadcaster announced that they would organise a multi-artist national final to select the German entry.

== Before Eurovision ==
=== Germany 12 Points ===
Germany 12 Points was the competition that selected Germany's entry for the Eurovision Song Contest 2022. The competition took place on 4 March 2022 at the Studio Berlin Adlershof in Berlin, and was hosted by Barbara Schöneberger. The show was broadcast on Das Erste and One as well as via radio on the nine ARD radio channels and online via the broadcaster's Eurovision Song Contest website eurovision.de. The national final was watched by 3.25 million viewers in Germany.

==== Competing entries ====
Interested artists and composers were able to submit their entries for the competition between 4 November 2021 and 30 November 2021. By the end of the process, it was announced that 944 submissions were received by NDR and 25 entries were shortlisted. The six competing entries were selected during a final casting round held in Berlin in January 2022 by a seven-member panel consisting of Alexandra Wolfslast (head of German delegation for Eurovision), Meike Nett (NDR 2 head of music), Holger Lachmann (Antenne Brandenburg head of music), Edi van Beek (Bayern 3 head of music), Gregor Friedel (SWR3 music director), Andreas Loeffler (WDR 2, WDR 4 and 1LIVE head of music) and Alexander Schmitz (MDR Jump music director). The six participating acts were announced during a press conference on 10 February 2022. Before the national final, a show called ESC vor Acht ("ESC pre Eight O'clock"), where the participants presented their songs and discussed topics related to the contest.

| Artist | Song | Songwriter(s) |
|---|---|---|
| Emily Roberts | "Soap" | Emily Roberts; Andreas Öhrn; Didrik Thott; Simon Wangemann |
| Eros Atomus | "Alive" | Eros Atomus; Eike Freese; Marcel Zürcher |
| Felicia Lu | "Anxiety" | Felicia Lu Kürbiß |
| Maël & Jonas | "I Swear to God" | Jonas Brochhausen; Maël Brunner |
| Malik Harris | "Rockstars" | Malik Harris; Marie Kobylka; Robin Karow |
| Nico Suave and Team Liebe | "Hallo Welt" | Nico Suave; Toni Mudrack; Niklas Esterle; Jan Dettwyler; Volker Neumüller; Buket; Joshua Stolten; Dominik Köhl; Johannes Arzberger |

==== Final ====
The televised final took place on 4 March 2022. The running order for the participating entries was determined on 23 February 2022 during the show Live nach Neun on Das Erste, hosted by Alina Stiegler and Peter Großmann. The winner, "Rockstars" performed by Malik Harris, was selected through a 100% public voting, being divided into a 50/50 combination of votes from radio voting and public voting, the latter which included options for landline and SMS voting. For the radio vote, listeners were able to vote via the official websites of the nine ARD radio channels between 28 February 2022 and 4 March 2022. In addition to the performances of the competing entries, 2016 Ukrainian Eurovision winner Jamala performed her winning song "1944", while 2014 Austrian Eurovision winner Conchita Wurst performed a medley of Eurovision entries together with 1973 German Eurovision entrant Gitte Hænning and member of 2006 German Eurovision entrant Texas Lightning, Jane Comerford.

Final – 4 March 2022
| R/O | Artist | Song | Radio | Televote | Total | Place |
|---|---|---|---|---|---|---|
| 1 | Malik Harris | "Rockstars" | 90 | 118 | 208 | 1 |
| 2 | Maël & Jonas | "I Swear to God" | 106 | 79 | 185 | 2 |
| 3 | Eros Atomus | "Alive" | 53 | 70 | 123 | 5 |
| 4 | Emily Roberts | "Soap" | 46 | 7 | 53 | 6 |
| 5 | Felicia Lu | "Anxiety" | 74 | 65 | 139 | 4 |
| 6 | Nico Suave and Team Liebe | "Hallo Welt" | 63 | 94 | 157 | 3 |

Detailed radio voting results
| R/O | Song | AB (RBB) | B3 (BR) | BV (RB) | hr3 (HR) | MDR Jump (MDR) | NDR2 (NDR) | SR1 (SR) | SWR3 (SWR) | WDR2 (WDR) | Total |
|---|---|---|---|---|---|---|---|---|---|---|---|
| 1 | "Rockstars" | 10 | 12 | 10 | 10 | 8 | 10 | 10 | 10 | 10 | 90 |
| 2 | "I Swear to God" | 12 | 10 | 12 | 12 | 12 | 12 | 12 | 12 | 12 | 106 |
| 3 | "Alive" | 5 | 6 | 6 | 6 | 6 | 6 | 6 | 6 | 6 | 53 |
| 4 | "Soap" | 6 | 5 | 5 | 5 | 5 | 5 | 5 | 5 | 5 | 46 |
| 5 | "Anxiety" | 8 | 8 | 8 | 8 | 10 | 8 | 8 | 8 | 8 | 74 |
| 6 | "Hallo Welt" | 7 | 7 | 7 | 7 | 7 | 7 | 7 | 7 | 7 | 63 |
Radio voting spokespersons
Antenna Brandenburg: Marcus Asmus and Anneli Rienecker; Bayern 3: Katja Wunderlich; bremen vier: Malte Janssen; hr3: Tobi Kämmerer; MDR Jump: Sarah von Neuburg and Lars-Christian Karde; NDR2: Elke Wiswedel and Jens Mahrhold; SR1: Daniel Simarro; SWR3: Constantin Zöller; WDR2: Jan Malte Andresen

==== Controversy ====
After the six acts were announced, the German broadcaster NDR was criticised for the lack of variety in the songs, representing predominantly to the musical genre of pop. Criticism also fell on the fact numerous artists applied to participate, but in the end the choice fell on previously unknown newcomers. Electric Callboy (formerly Eskimo Callboy) had submitted an entry into the national final but was later rejected, which led to the band's fans launching a petition with the aim of granting the band a spot in the competition. Although the petition had gained over 110 thousand signatures, the band was ultimately not invited to compete.

Among the competing acts, Nico Suave (who participated alongside Team Liebe) was criticised for signing a statement of solidarity for Xavier Naidoo in 2015 and then continuing to work with him after his political statements had been repeatedly criticized. Naidoo had been internally chosen to represent Germany in 2016, but was dropped due to his political views in support of the Reichsbürger movement, as well as homophobic and racist remarks the performer had made through both his statements and music.

== At Eurovision ==
According to Eurovision rules, all nations with the exceptions of the host country and the "Big Five" (France, Germany, Italy, Spain and the United Kingdom) are required to qualify from one of two semi-finals in order to compete for the final; the top ten countries from each semi-final progress to the final. As a member of the "Big Five", Germany automatically qualified to compete in the final on 14 May 2022. Germany was set to perform in the first half of the final. In addition to their participation in the final, Germany was also required to broadcast and vote in one of the two semi-finals. This was decided via a draw held during the semi-final allocation draw on 25 January 2022, when it was announced that Germany would be voting in the second semi-final.

Germany performed in position 13, following the entry from Ukraine and before the entry from Lithuania. At the close of the voting, Germany came in last place with 6 points, all of which came from televoting. The final was watched by 6.54 million viewers in Germany, which meant a market share of 32.7 per cent.

=== Voting ===
==== Points awarded to Germany ====
Points awarded to Germany (Final)
| Score | Televote | Jury |
|---|---|---|
| 12 points | | |
| 10 points | | |
| 8 points | | |
| 7 points | | |
| 6 points | | |
| 5 points | | |
| 4 points | | |
| 3 points | | |
| 2 points | Austria; Estonia; Switzerland | |
| 1 point | | |

==== Points awarded by Germany ====
Points awarded by Germany (Semi-final 2)
| Score | Televote | Jury |
|---|---|---|
| 12 points | Poland | North Macedonia |
| 10 points | Serbia | Azerbaijan |
| 8 points | Sweden | Romania |
| 7 points | Finland | Sweden |
| 6 points | Czech Republic | Australia |
| 5 points | Romania | Belgium |
| 4 points | Estonia | Estonia |
| 3 points | Australia | Georgia |
| 2 points | Israel | Israel |
| 1 point | Belgium | Finland |

Points awarded by Germany (Final)
| Score | Televote | Jury |
|---|---|---|
| 12 points | Ukraine | United Kingdom |
| 10 points | Moldova | Ukraine |
| 8 points | Poland | Spain |
| 7 points | Serbia | Sweden |
| 6 points | United Kingdom | Azerbaijan |
| 5 points | Sweden | Australia |
| 4 points | Netherlands | Netherlands |
| 3 points | Italy | Norway |
| 2 points | Spain | Switzerland |
| 1 point | Norway | Romania |

==== Detailed voting results ====
The following members comprised the German jury:

- Christian Brost - radio host at hr3
- Jessica Schöne – presenter, host of the 2021 Junior Eurovision national final
- Michelle – singer, represented Germany at the Eurovision Song Contest 2001
- Max Giesinger – musician, singer-songwriter
- Tokunbo Akinro – jazz artist, singer-songwriter

Detailed voting results from Germany (Semi-final 2)
| R/O | Country | Jury | | | | | | | Televote | |
| R/O | Country | Juror A | Juror B | Juror C | Juror D | Juror E | Rank | Points | Rank | Points |
|---|---|---|---|---|---|---|---|---|---|---|
| 01 | Finland | 5 | 11 | 7 | 10 | 6 | 10 | 1 | 4 | 7 |
| 02 | Israel | 4 | 9 | 11 | 15 | 2 | 9 | 2 | 9 | 2 |
| 03 | Serbia | 18 | 15 | 13 | 14 | 10 | 17 | | 2 | 10 |
| 04 | Azerbaijan | 11 | 2 | 8 | 2 | 4 | 2 | 10 | 16 | |
| 05 | Georgia | 3 | 8 | 1 | 18 | 17 | 8 | 3 | 13 | |
| 06 | Malta | 6 | 17 | 9 | 12 | 15 | 14 | | 17 | |
| 07 | San Marino | 15 | 18 | 4 | 13 | 12 | 12 | | 11 | |
| 08 | Australia | 1 | 6 | 10 | 9 | 5 | 5 | 6 | 8 | 3 |
| 09 | Cyprus | 14 | 13 | 14 | 7 | 13 | 15 | | 12 | |
| 10 | Ireland | 16 | 16 | 18 | 17 | 18 | 18 | | 14 | |
| 11 | North Macedonia | 8 | 4 | 3 | 4 | 1 | 1 | 12 | 15 | |
| 12 | Estonia | 7 | 7 | 2 | 6 | 9 | 7 | 4 | 7 | 4 |
| 13 | Romania | 17 | 1 | 12 | 3 | 3 | 3 | 8 | 6 | 5 |
| 14 | Poland | 9 | 12 | 6 | 11 | 14 | 11 | | 1 | 12 |
| 15 | Montenegro | 10 | 14 | 17 | 16 | 11 | 16 | | 18 | |
| 16 | Belgium | 2 | 5 | 15 | 5 | 7 | 6 | 5 | 10 | 1 |
| 17 | Sweden | 13 | 3 | 5 | 1 | 16 | 4 | 7 | 3 | 8 |
| 18 | Czech Republic | 12 | 10 | 16 | 8 | 8 | 13 | | 5 | 6 |

Detailed voting results from Germany (Final)
| R/O | Country | Jury | | | | | | | Televote | |
| R/O | Country | Juror A | Juror B | Juror C | Juror D | Juror E | Rank | Points | Rank | Points |
|---|---|---|---|---|---|---|---|---|---|---|
| 01 | Czech Republic | 20 | 22 | 12 | 22 | 16 | 23 | | 22 | |
| 02 | Romania | 11 | 17 | 4 | 23 | 6 | 10 | 1 | 17 | |
| 03 | Portugal | 13 | 7 | 17 | 14 | 15 | 16 | | 11 | |
| 04 | Finland | 22 | 18 | 10 | 19 | 21 | 21 | | 12 | |
| 05 | Switzerland | 5 | 21 | 3 | 17 | 19 | 9 | 2 | 16 | |
| 06 | France | 24 | 24 | 9 | 20 | 24 | 22 | | 18 | |
| 07 | Norway | 6 | 15 | 20 | 7 | 5 | 8 | 3 | 10 | 1 |
| 08 | Armenia | 16 | 19 | 15 | 18 | 9 | 20 | | 14 | |
| 09 | Italy | 21 | 9 | 16 | 21 | 12 | 18 | | 8 | 3 |
| 10 | Spain | 1 | 2 | 8 | 9 | 3 | 3 | 8 | 9 | 2 |
| 11 | Netherlands | 14 | 5 | 18 | 3 | 11 | 7 | 4 | 7 | 4 |
| 12 | Ukraine | 2 | 1 | 13 | 5 | 2 | 2 | 10 | 1 | 12 |
| 13 | Germany | | | | | | | | | |
| 14 | Lithuania | 19 | 8 | 22 | 16 | 17 | 19 | | 13 | |
| 15 | Azerbaijan | 8 | 20 | 2 | 8 | 8 | 5 | 6 | 23 | |
| 16 | Belgium | 18 | 6 | 5 | 13 | 13 | 11 | | 21 | |
| 17 | Greece | 15 | 14 | 19 | 11 | 10 | 17 | | 19 | |
| 18 | Iceland | 23 | 13 | 21 | 24 | 22 | 24 | | 24 | |
| 19 | Moldova | 7 | 23 | 7 | 15 | 23 | 15 | | 2 | 10 |
| 20 | Sweden | 4 | 16 | 11 | 2 | 1 | 4 | 7 | 6 | 5 |
| 21 | Australia | 10 | 12 | 1 | 12 | 20 | 6 | 5 | 20 | |
| 22 | United Kingdom | 3 | 3 | 6 | 1 | 4 | 1 | 12 | 5 | 6 |
| 23 | Poland | 17 | 4 | 23 | 10 | 14 | 14 | | 3 | 8 |
| 24 | Serbia | 9 | 10 | 24 | 4 | 18 | 13 | | 4 | 7 |
| 25 | Estonia | 12 | 11 | 14 | 6 | 7 | 12 | | 15 | |
