= Laura Karasek =

German author, television presenter, lawyer, columnist and actor

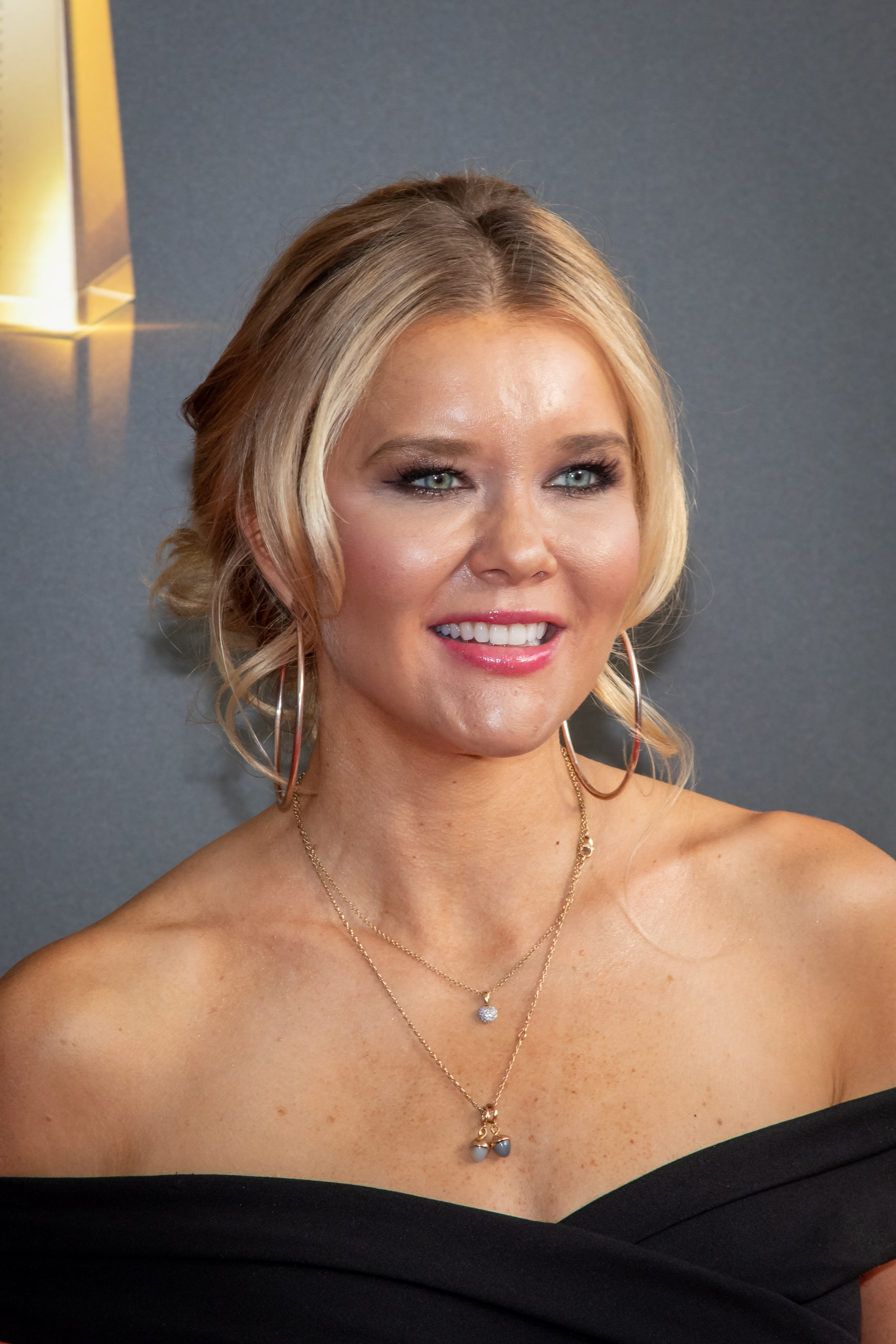
- Karasek in 2021
- Born: 29 April 1982 (age 43); Hamburg, Germany
- Occupations: Author; TV presenter; Lawyer
- Spouse: Dominic Briggs (after 2013)
- Children: 2

Laura Karasek (born 29 April 1982) is a German author, television presenter, lawyer, columnist and actor.

== Life and career ==
Laura Karasek was born on 29 April 1982 in Hamburg, Germany. After completing her Abitur, she studied law in Berlin, Frankfurt and Paris. From 2011, she worked for the chancellery Clifford Chance. She is also a lawyer in a corporate law firm based in Frankfurt.

Karasek was several times a guest on Markus Lanz, Kölner Treff, NDR Talkshow, ZDF-Fernsehgarten, and other shows.

=== Personal life ===
In 2013, Karasek married the banker Dominic Briggs. The couple have twins born in 2015. From December 2021, Karasek reinforced a few times the cabaret artist Florian Schroeder as editorial director in the Florian Schroeder Satire Show on ARD. In 2022, she was a co-founder of PEN Berlin.

== Works ==
- Laura Karasek: Verspielte Jahre. 2nd edition. Bastei Lübbe Quadriga, Cologne 2012, ISBN 978-3-86995-038-9.
- Laura Karasek: Ja, die sind echt: Geschichten über Frauen und Männer. Eichborn, Cologne 2019, ISBN 978-3-8479-0657-5.
- Laura Karasek: Drei Wünsche. 3. Auflage. Eichborn, Cologne 2019, ISBN 978-3-8479-0659-9.
