= Rockstars (Malik Harris song) =

2022 song by Malik Harris

Single by Malik Harris

from the album Anonymous Colonist (Rockstars Edition)
- Language: English
- Released: 4 February 2022
- Genre: Pop
- Length: 2:59
- Label: Universal
- Songwriters: Malik Harris; Marie Kobylka; Robin Karow

Music video
- "Rockstars" on YouTube

Eurovision Song Contest 2022 entry
- Country: Germany
- Artist: Malik Harris
- Language: English
- Composers: Malik Harris; Marie Kobylka; Robin Karow
- Lyricists: Malik Harris; Marie Kobylka; Robin Karow

Finals performance
- Final result: 25th
- Final points: 6

Entry chronology
- ◄ "I Don't Feel Hate" (2021)
- "Blood & Glitter" (2023) ►

"Rockstars" is a 2022 song by German singer Malik Harris. The song represented Germany in the Eurovision Song Contest 2022 in Turin, Italy after winning Germany 12 Points, Germany's national final. It finished in last (25th) place at Eurovision with six points, all from televoting as it received no points from jury votes. The song reached number eight in the German charts.

== Background ==
According to Harris, "Rockstars" was written after Harris watched his favorite episode of The Office, "Finale". A quote from character Andy Bernard, "I wish there was a way to know you’re in the Good Old Days – before you’ve actually left them", would inspire the song for Harris.

== Eurovision Song Contest ==
=== At Eurovision ===
According to Eurovision rules, all nations with the exceptions of the host country and the "Big Five" (France, Germany, Italy, Spain and the United Kingdom) are required to qualify from one of two semi-finals in order to compete for the final; the top ten countries from each semi-final progress to the final. As a member of the "Big Five", Germany automatically qualifies to compete in the final on 14 May 2022. In addition to their participation in the final, Germany was also required to broadcast and vote in one of the two semi-finals. This was decided via a draw held during the semi-final allocation draw on 25 January 2022, when it was announced that Germany would vote in the second semi-final.

== Charts ==
=== Weekly charts ===
Weekly chart performance for "Rockstars"
Chart (2022)	Peak position
Austria (Ö3 Austria Top 40)	44
Germany (GfK)	8
Lithuania (AGATA)	27
Netherlands (Single Tip)	27
Sweden Heatseeker (Sverigetopplistan)	8
Switzerland (Schweizer Hitparade)	68
UK Singles Downloads (OCC)	36

=== Year-end charts ===
2022 year-end chart performance for "Rockstars"
Chart (2022)	Position
Germany (Official German Charts)	94

== Certifications ==
Certifications for "Rockstars"
Region	Certification	Certified units/sales
Germany (BVMI)	Gold	200,000^{‡}
^{‡} Sales+streaming figures based on certification alone.
