= Always on the Run (Isaak song) =

2024 song by Isaak

Single by Isaak
- Released: 19 January 2024
- Genre: Pop
- Length: 3:29 (original version); 3:05 (Eurovision version)
- Label: Good Kid gmbH
- Songwriters: Isaak Guderian; Kevin Lehr; Leo Jupiter; Greg Taro
- Producers: Lost; Leo Jupiter

Isaak singles chronology
"Postcard" (2023)	"Always on the Run" (2024)	"Never the Same" (2024)

Eurovision Song Contest 2024 entry
- Country: Germany
- Artist: Isaak
- Language: English
- Composers: Isaak Guderian; Kevin Lehr; Leo Salminen; Greg Taro
- Lyricists: Guderian; Lost; Jupiter; Taro

Finals performance
- Final result: 12th
- Final points: 117

Entry chronology
- ◄ "Blood & Glitter" (2023)
- "Baller" (2025) ►

Official performance video
- "Always on the Run" (First Semi-Final) on YouTube "Always on the Run" (Grand Final) on YouTube

"Always on the Run" is a song by German singer-songwriter Isaak. It was written by Isaak, Kevin Lehr, Leo Jupiter, and Greg Taro, and jointly released on 19 January 2024 between Good Kid Records and Polydor Records. "Always on the Run" represented Germany in the Eurovision Song Contest 2024, where it finished in 12th place with 117 points.

== Background and composition ==
"Always on the Run" was written by Isaak Guderian, Kevin Lehr, Leo Jupiter, and Greg Taro. According to Isaak, the song speaks about "running from the problems I never solved" to a location of "salvation". In an analysis by Wiwibloggs' Tom Hendryk, they wrote that it addressed themes of "trapped in a cycle of uncertainty" between one's hopes and doubts. As a result of the battle, they end up "running away", tired of chasing success constantly and admitting a "sense of resignation" when it comes to altering his life.

In interviews, Isaak stated that he did not write the song for the sole purpose of entering the Eurovision Song Contest, but eventually decided to enter the song after he thought about the opportunity. On 19 January, it was released as an official competitor for Eurovision Song Contest – Das deutsche Finale 2024, Norddeutscher Rundfunk (NDR)'s national final to select Germany's representative for the Eurovision Song Contest 2024. On the same day, it was released as a digital download along with seven other songs competing in the competition.

== Critical reception ==
"Always on the Run" has received negative reception. In a Wiwibloggs review containing several reviews from several critics, the song was rated 5.17 out of 10 points, earning 33rd out of 37 songs on the site's annual ranking. Another review by i's Emily Baker remarked the song as "boring", stating that she thought the song lacked uniqueness. Vulture's Jon O'Brien ranked the song 29th overall, sharing the same sentiment as Baker in terms of the song's uniqueness and comparing it negatively to Lewis Capaldi, Rag'n'Bone Man, "or any number of British male vocalists who sound like they desperately need a throat lozenge". ESC Beat's Doron Lahav ranked the song 32nd overall, stating that while they thought the song was "radio-friendly", they doubted if the song could compete for a good finish in the grand final.

== Music video and promotion ==
Along with the song's release, an accompanying music video was released on the same day. To further promote the song, Isaak announced his intents to participate in various Eurovision pre-parties throughout the months of March and April after his victory in Eurovision Song Contest – Das deutsche Finale 2024, including Pre-Party ES 2024 on 30 March, the London Eurovision Party 2024 on 7 April, and Eurovision in Concert 2024 on 13 April.

== Eurovision Song Contest ==
=== Eurovision Song Contest – Das deutsche Finale 2024 ===
Germany's broadcaster for the Eurovision Song Contest, Norddeutscher Rundfunk (NDR), organized a nine-entry competition, Eurovision Song Contest – Das deutsche Finale 2024 to select its entrant for the Eurovision Song Contest 2024. A singular grand final was held on 16 February 2024. Eight songs were automatically chosen by the broadcaster to compete in the grand final, and another wildcard song was chosen via a separate televised competition. The winner of the competition was selected by a 50/50 system of juries and televoting.

"Always on the Run" was announced as a competing song in the competition on 19 January 2024 as an automatic qualifier, where it was later drawn to perform third, In the grand final, it managed to earn first place in both the juries and televoting, earning 24 total points, four points ahead of the runner-up, Max Mutzke's "Forever Strong". As a result of winning the competition, the song won the rights to represent Germany in the Eurovision Song Contest 2024.

=== At Eurovision ===
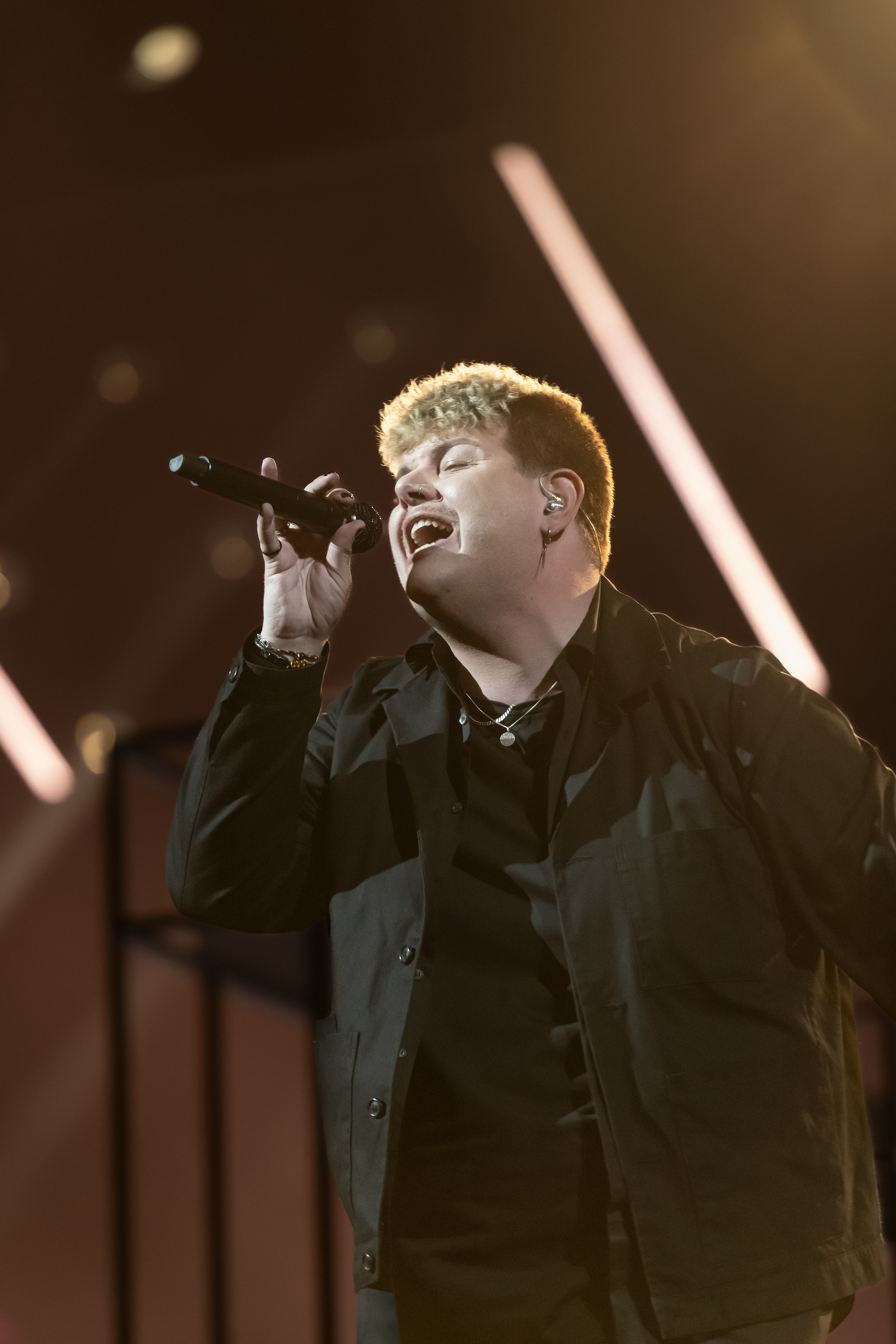
Isaak performing during the dress rehearsal at first semi final in Malmö, Sweden.

The Eurovision Song Contest 2024 took place at the Malmö Arena in Malmö, Sweden, and consisted of two semi-finals held on the respective dates of 7 and 9 May and the final on 11 May 2024. As Germany was a member of the "Big Five", Isaak automatically qualified for the grand final. He was later drawn to perform in the first half of the grand final.

For its Eurovision performance, the song itself was altered, with minor lyrical changes having to be implemented due to the European Broadcasting Union's ban on curse words in the Eurovision Song Contest. Dan Shipton was appointed as the creative director for the performance, with additional assistance coming from Black Skull Creative, Shipton's company. It featured Isaak wearing a black suit in a "stylish, sleek room" surrounded by flames during the beginning of the performance. Nearing the end of the performance, the set is removed for him to sing alone on stage. Along with Isaak, four backing singers accompanied him on stage. The song was performed in third, after Ukraine's duo of Alyona Alyona and Jerry Heil and before Luxembourg's Tali. After the results were announced, he finished in 12th with 117 points, with a split score of 99 points from the juries and 18 points from televoting. No country gave the maximum 12 points in either category; Israel gave the highest amount for both sets, allocating 10 jury points and eight televoting points for the entry.

== Charts ==
Chart performance for "Always on the Run"
Chart (2024)	Peak position
Austria (Ö3 Austria Top 40)	69
Czech Republic Airplay (ČNS IFPI)	52
Germany (GfK)	22
Greece International (IFPI)	47
Lithuania (AGATA)	21
Netherlands (Single Tip)	29
Sweden Heatseeker (Sverigetopplistan)	4
Switzerland (Schweizer Hitparade)	58
UK Singles Downloads (Official Charts)	56
UK Singles Sales (OCC)	57

== Release history ==
Release history and formats for "Always on the Run"
Country	Date	Format(s)	Label	Ref.
Various	19 January 2024	Digital download; streaming	Good Kid Records	
