= Blood & Glitter =

2023 song by Lord of the Lost

Single by Lord of the Lost

from the album Blood & Glitter
- Language: English
- Released: 24 December 2022
- Genre: Gothic Metal
- Length: 2:59
- Label: Napalm
- Songwriter(s): Anthony J. Brown; Chris Harms; Pi Stoffers; Rupert Keplinger
- Producer(s): Chris Harms; Corvin Bahn

Music video
- Blood & Glitter (Official Video) on YouTube

Eurovision Song Contest 2023 entry
- Country: Germany
- Artist(s): Lord of the Lost
- Language: English
- Composer(s): Chris Harms; Rupert Keplinger
- Lyricist(s): Anthony J. Brown; Chris Harms; Pi Stoffers; Rupert Keplinger

Finals performance
- Final result: 26th
- Final points: 18

Entry chronology
- ◄ "Rockstars" (2022)
- "Always on the Run" (2024) ►

"Blood & Glitter" is a song by German gothic metal band Lord of the Lost. It was released on 24 December 2022 through Napalm. The song represented Germany in the Eurovision Song Contest 2023 in Liverpool after winning Unser Lied für Liverpool, Germany's national final, and finished in last position.

== Background ==
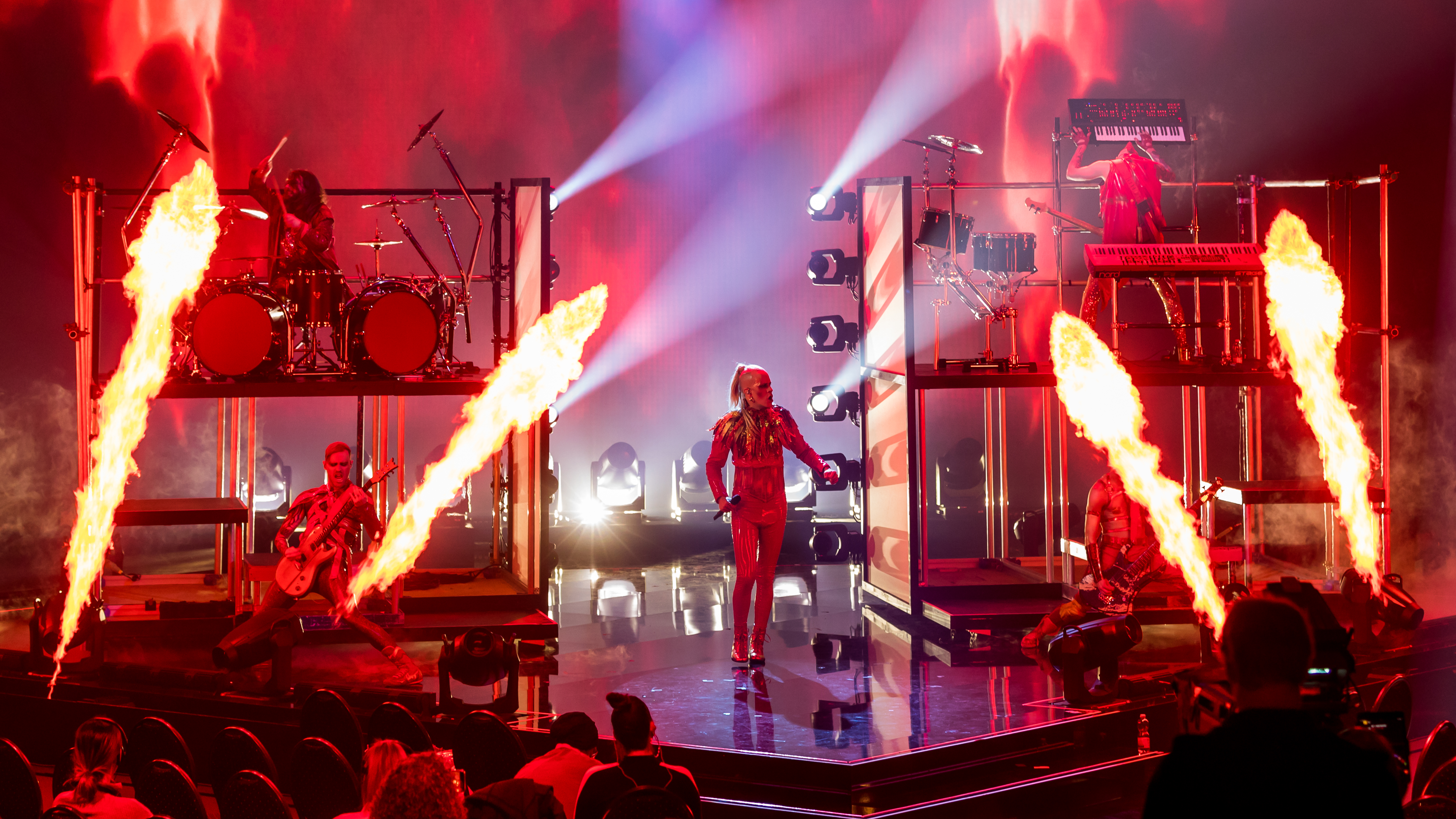

The dark rock song was released as the lead single from their eleventh studio album Blood & Glitter (2022). Lead singer Chris Harms revealed that the band had actually applied to represent Germany for many years leading up to their win in 2023. Starting on 24 February 2023, fans were able to vote for their favourite entry online. The performance was described as a "fiery glam rock show", somewhere between "dark" and "gothic metal". The band eventually won the contest, having earned 189 points consisting of 146 from fans and viewers and 43 points the international juries.

== Eurovision Song Contest ==
=== At Eurovision ===
For their performance in Liverpool, Harms plans a glamorous rock show for the band, wanting to include red pyrotechnic rain to reflect the message of the song.

== Charts ==
Chart performance for "Blood & Glitter"
Chart (2023)	Peak position
Lithuania (AGATA)	69
UK Singles Downloads (OCC)	54
UK Rock & Metal (OCC)	19
