= Amnesia (Roxen song) =

2021 song by Roxen

Single by Roxen
- Released: 4 March 2021
- Length: 2:54
- Label: Warner
- Songwriters: Adelina Stîngă; Victor Bouroșu
- Producer: Victor Bouroșu

Roxen singles chronology
"Parte din tine" (2021)	"Amnesia" (2021)	"Inimă nu fi de piatră" (2021)

Alternative covers
- Initial cover artwork

Music video
- "Amnesia" on YouTube

Eurovision Song Contest 2021 entry
- Country: Romania
- Artist: Roxen
- Composers: Adelina Stîngă; Victor Bouroșu
- Lyricists: Stîngă; Bouroșu

Finals performance
- Semi-final result: 12th
- Semi-final points: 85

Entry chronology
- ◄ "Alcohol You" (2020)
- "Llámame" (2022) ►

"Amnesia" is a song recorded by Romanian singer Roxen, digitally released by Warner Music Poland on 4 March 2021. It was written by Adelina Stîngă and Victor Bouroșu, while the production was solely handled by the latter. A dark ballad, the song's lyrics discuss combatting self-neglection in modern society, referring to this phenomenon as "self-love amnesia". Music critics generally applauded the song, with praise concentrated on its catchiness and commercial appeal, as well as on Roxen's vocal delivery. For promotional purposes, a music video was released simultaneously with the digital premiere of the song and was directed by Bogdan Păun. Filmed at an empty National Theatre Bucharest, the visual shows Roxen and several dancers performing contemporary dance to portray the story of a person who manages to gain control over their surrounding fears.

Romanian broadcaster Romanian Television (TVR) internally selected Roxen as Romania's contestant and "Amnesia" as the nation's entry for the Eurovision Song Contest 2021. The singer was previously scheduled to perform "Alcohol You" at the 2020 contest, which was cancelled due to the COVID-19 pandemic. Presenting a stage show similar to the music video of the song, Roxen failed to progress from the semi-finals, placing 12th in a field of 16 with 85 points, marking Romania's third non-qualification in the contest. Upon the event, "Amnesia" reached numbers 51 and 26 on Lithuania's AGATA and the Netherlands' Single Tip rankings, respectively.

== Background and release ==
"Amnesia" was written by Adelina Stîngă and Victor Bouroșu, while the production was solely handled by the latter. Bouroșu, better known under the stage name of Vicky Red, had previously collaborated with Roxen on several songs, including on "Alcohol You", which was selected as Romania's entry for the COVID-19-cancelled Eurovision Song Contest 2020. "Amnesia" was released for digital download and streaming in various territories on 4 March 2021 by Warner Music Poland, whom Roxen's label Global Records had partnered with for a promotional campaign for the singer in July 2020. The song was already available to the public prior to its planned premiere at 20:00 CET on the same day via TVR1; this prompted Wiwibloggs's Lucy Percy to speculate that the singer's team had "accidentally set the release [...] to midnight local time, rather than coordinating with the time of the official announcement".

== Composition and reception ==
Musically, "Amnesia" has been described as a "dark" and "melancholic" ballad that has a similar "vulnerab[le]" and "delicate" nature to "Alcohol You", though marked a departure from Roxen's fellow dance-pop releases. Incorporating what Percy saw as a "modern" and "youthful" sound, "Amnesia" builds into a "thumping finale" after its "soulful" verses and "powerful" mid-tempo beat-driven refrain. Roxen sings in a "raspy" manner on the track, which, alongside its catchy nature and commercial appeal, was praised by multiple music critics. Conversely, however, Boris Meersman of ESCUnited saw "Amnesia" as "poor" and noted its forgettable melody; he further criticized Roxen's diction and the use of "warbled" Auto-Tune on their vocals. In a Wiwibloggs review containing several reviews from individual critics, the song was rated 6.95 out of 10 points, and likened to Pam Rabbit's "Get Up" (2020) by an observer. Commercially, "Amnesia" reached the charts of selected countries after its participation in the Eurovision Song Contest 2021. It peaked at number 51 on Lithuania's AGATA ranking. The song also reached number 26 on the Dutch Single Tip chart, which acts as an extension to the main Single Top 100 ranking.

== Lyrical interpretation ==
Lyrically, "Amnesia" delves into combatting self-neglection in modern society, with Roxen referring to this phenomenon as "self-love amnesia". The song opens with Roxen lamenting over their younger self, who was "shining like a pearl" and "could push the night so far away", but eventually "lost [them]self tryna have it all". The lyrics, which have been labelled as "brutal at times" and as having a "tone [...] of sadness and confusion", further include lines such as: "[T]he world feels in a rush and they say they know it all", "Giving all they want might make you lose control, [...] people always say 'be careful what you wishin' for'" and "Self love, it's never gone, self love, put it back on". Regarding the track's message, Roxen stated: "The last year was a bit of a rollercoaster [...]. 'Amnesia' somehow manages to give a voice to all repressed feelings and to the people whose voices haven't been heard, in a way that for me is incredibly pure." Inspiration also came from the singer's emotional state after being diagnosed with lyme disease at the age of 14.

== Music video and promotion ==
A shot from the song's music video, showing Roxen surrounded by contemporary dance artists at an empty National Theatre Bucharest.

An accompanying music video was uploaded to both Roxen's and the Eurovision Song Contest's YouTube channels on 4 March 2021. Filmed at an empty National Theatre Bucharest and directed by Bogdan Păun, the visual portrays Roxen sporting black outfits while performing choreography with contemporary dance artists dressed in white. It ends with the message: "For every shout that went unheard".

Regarding the video's meaning, Romanian broadcaster Romanian Television (TVR) explained that it tells the story "of a single person, who struggles with their inner self, with the states that are controlled by her external environment. Although they are constantly surrounded by fears, which have control over their, [they] manages to get rid of them, regains control and becomes increasingly strong and confident in their strengths”. For further promotion, Roxen performed "Amnesia" during the virtual Concert in the Dark and Wiwi Jam events in April and May 2021, respectively. A video of her singing a stripped-down version of the song on the rooftop of a Rotterdam building was also released on the YouTube channel of the Eurovision Song Contest in the latter month.

== At Eurovision ==
=== Before Rotterdam ===
Following on from the cancelled Eurovision Song Contest 2020, Roxen was again internally selected to represent Romania at the 2021 contest as part of TVR's collaboration with Global Records. She was announced as the Romanian representative on 31 March 2020, and "Amnesia" was chosen as her entry by an internal jury panel made up of several music industry professionals. It was part of around six other shortlisted English-language songs that Roxen had recorded demos of. The track surfacing on music platforms prior to the scheduled reveal of Romania's entry on TVR1 prompted speculation among observers.

In accordance with the European Broadcasting Union's (EBU) prevention plan against a COVID-19-cancellation of the Eurovision Song Contest 2021, each participant was required to record a live-on-tape performance of their entry in a location of their choice prior to the event; the tape was to be broadcast during Eurovision in case the artist was unable to travel to the contest's venue to perform their song due to pandemic restrictions or related reasons. A large portion of the mostly unused live-on-tape performances, including Roxen's, were unveiled after the contest as part of Eurovision's Celebration YouTube shows. The live-on-tape recording for "Amnesia" was done on 23 March 2021 at TVR's studio in Bucharest.

=== In Rotterdam ===
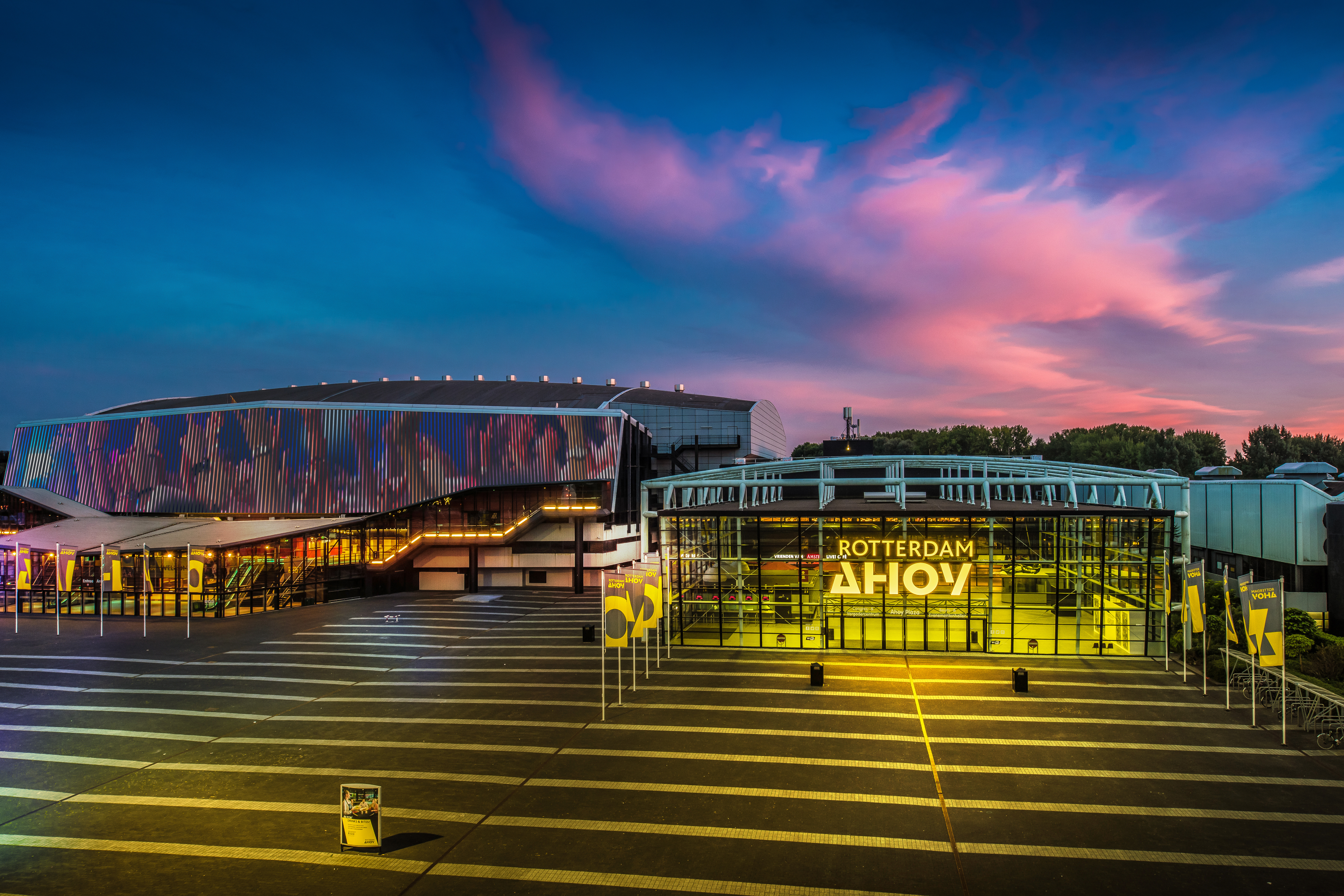
Roxen performed "Amnesia" at Rotterdam Ahoy (pictured) in Rotterdam during the Eurovision Song Contest 2021.

The Eurovision Song Contest 2021 took place at Rotterdam Ahoy in Rotterdam, Netherlands and consisted of two semi-finals on 18 and 20 May, respectively, and the final on 22 May 2021. According to Eurovision rules, each country, except the host country and the "Big Five" (France, Germany, Italy, Spain and the United Kingdom), was required to qualify from one of two semi-finals to compete for the final; the top ten countries from each semi-final progressed to the final. In March 2021, it was announced that "Amnesia" would be performed 13th in the first semi-final of the contest, following Israel and preceding Azerbaijan.

Romania was scheduled for technical rehearsals at Rotterdam Ahoy on 9 and 12 May 2021, during which Roxen wore an oversized hoodie, joggers and boots; this outfit was ultimately changed in favour of a dress with a floral print for the semi-final performance. The show was designed to resemble the music video of "Amnesia", however with the involvement of only five dancers, and was directed by Păun and Dan Manoliu. Throughout the performance, silhouettes "trying to break free from the screens" are featured on the LED backdrop as Roxen and the barefoot dancers execute an "elaborate" interpretive dance choreography in which, at one point, the singer is dragged across the stage; Roxen is seen fighting with the dancers, which represent their inner demons. As the performance progresses, the singer walks to the B-stage and the show's staging transitions from being smoke-filled and having a dark color scheme to showcasing "radiating warm oranges, yellows and pinks" and a "hopeful" sunrise on the screen. At the end, Roxen prominently belts out a high note and then proceeds to fall down into the dancers as the message "for every shout that went unheard" is displayed.

The reception of the performance was mixed. Multiple observers criticized Roxen's vocal delivery and pronunciation, with Oliver Adams of Wiwibloggs questioning whether their heavy movement as part of the choreography was the reason behind the former. While both an editor of ESCXtra and Meersman praised the dancing, which the latter saw as being "beautiful and symbolic", Meersman further applauded the "gorgeous" backdrops and camera angles. Although criticizing Roxen's lack of eye contact with the viewer, he acknowledged that her performance showcased artistic growth.

==== Points awarded to Romania ====
Below is a breakdown of points awarded to Romania in the contest's second semi-final, as well as the breakdown of the jury voting and televoting conducted during the show. Romania was placed 12th, with a total of 85 points, thus failing to qualify for the grand final; this is one of the nation's worst results ever and their third non-qualification, consecutive to the previous ones. Romania received 27 televoting points, which included 10 awarded by Italy. The jury points added to 58, including 12 from Malta and 10 from Cyprus.

Points awarded to Romania (Semi-final 1)
Score	Televote	Jury
12 points		Malta
10 points	Italy	Cyprus
8 points		
7 points		Azerbaijan; Ukraine
6 points		Germany
5 points	Azerbaijan; Cyprus	Belgium; Lithuania
4 points		
3 points	Ireland; Malta	Croatia
2 points		Norway
1 point	Belgium	Netherlands

== Track listing ==
- Digital download
1. "Amnesia" – 2:54

== Charts ==
Chart performance for "Amnesia"
Chart (2021)	Peak position
Lithuania (AGATA)	51
Netherlands (Single Tip)	26

== Release history ==
Release history for "Amnesia"
Country	Date	Format(s)	Label	Ref.
Various	4 March 2021	Digital download; streaming	Warner	
