= Romania in the Eurovision Song Contest 2021 =

- Eurovision Song Contest 2021
- Participating broadcaster: Televiziunea Română (TVR)
- Country: Romania
- Selection process: Internal selection
- Announcement date: Artist: 31 March 2020; Song: 4 March 2021

Competing entry
- Song: "Amnesia"
- Artist: Roxen
- Songwriters: Adelina Stîngă; Victor Bouroșu

Placement
- Semi-final result: Failed to qualify (12th)

Participation chronology

Romania was represented at the Eurovision Song Contest 2021. Their entry, "Amnesia" by Romanian singer Roxen, was internally selected by a professional jury panel as part of the partnership between broadcaster Televiziunea Română (TVR) and the singer's label Global Records. Roxen was initially due to compete in the 2020 contest with "Alcohol You", however, the event was ultimately cancelled due to the COVID-19 pandemic. Prior to Eurovision 2021, "Amnesia" was promoted by the release of a music video and several live performances. Romania failed to qualify from the contest's first semi-final on 18 May 2021, placing 12th and scoring a total of 85 points. This marked Romania's third non-qualification, consecutive to the previous ones. During Roxen's stage performance directed by Bogdan Păun and Dan Manoliu, the singer was accompanied by five dancers and was portrayed executing an interpretative dance choreography with them.

== Background ==
Prior to the 2021 contest, Romania had participated in the Eurovision Song Contest 20 times since its first entry in 1994. Its highest placing in the contest, to this point, has been third place, which the nation achieved on two occasions: in 2005 with the song "Let Me Try" performed by Luminița Anghel and Sistem, and in 2010 with "Playing with Fire" by Paula Seling and Ovi. In 2019, Romania failed to qualify to the final, placing 13th in the second semi-final with Ester Peony's "On a Sunday". This marked the second consecutive time that the nation failed to qualify to the final of the Eurovision Song Contest since the introduction of semi-finals in 2004, after 2018. In 2020, Televiziunea Română (TVR) had collaborated with Global Records to select the Romanian entry, yielding in Roxen being chosen internally to perform "Alcohol You"; the latter was selected through the national final format Selecția Națională 2020. However, the contest was ultimately cancelled due to the COVID-19 pandemic.

== Before Eurovision ==
Logo for Romania's 2021 Eurovision Song Contest participation, with the slogan "E altceva" (Romanian: "It's something different").

=== Internal selection ===
Upon discussions with Global Records, on 31 March 2020, TVR's Liana Stanciu (Romania's 2020 head of delegation) confirmed its intention to participate in the Eurovision Song Contest 2021, as well as that Roxen would be kept as Romania's representative for the event. During an Instagram post in January 2021, Roxen shared the news of having found "the perfect song for Eurovision 2021", suggesting that TVR had no plans of organising a multiple-song national final as in the previous year. Soon after, TVR confirmed that Roxen's entry for 2021 would be chosen internally out of several demos recorded throughout February 2021 by a jury panel due to budgetary constraints and COVID-19 safety measures. Around six English-language songs had been shortlisted to be rated by the jury which was made up of several industry professionals: Luminiţa Anghel, Andrei Tudor, Stanciu, Lucian Ștefan, Bogdan Păun, Liviu Elekes, Bogdan Pavlică, Dan Manoliu and Gabriel Scîrlet. Among the entries was also the second-placed and thus unselected "UFO", which was eventually released as a single on 9 February 2022.

The chosen song, titled "Amnesia", was released on 4 March 2021 alongside an accompanying music video directed by Păun. "Amnesia" was written by Adelina Stîngă and Victor Bouroșu, while the production was solely handled by the latter.

=== Preparation and promotion ===
In accordance with the European Broadcasting Union's (EBU) prevention plan against a COVID-19-cancellation of the Eurovision Song Contest 2021, each participant was required to record a live-on-tape performance of their entry in a location of their choice prior to the event; the tape was to be broadcast during Eurovision in case the artist was unable to travel to the contest venue to perform their song due to pandemic restrictions or related reasons. A large portion of the mostly unused live-on-tape performances, including Roxen's, were unveiled after the contest as part of Eurovision's Celebration YouTube shows. The live-on-tape recording for "Amnesia" was done on 23 March 2021 at TVR's studio in Bucharest.

Throughout May 2021, the segment Destinația Eurovision was hosted by Sonia Argint and aired by TVR, documenting Roxen's preparations for Eurovision. For further promotion, Roxen performed the song during the virtual Concert in the Dark and Wiwi Jam events in April and May 2021, respectively. A video of Roxen singing a stripped-down version of "Amnesia" on the rooftop of a Rotterdam building was also released on the YouTube channel of the Eurovision Song Contest in the latter month.

== At Eurovision ==
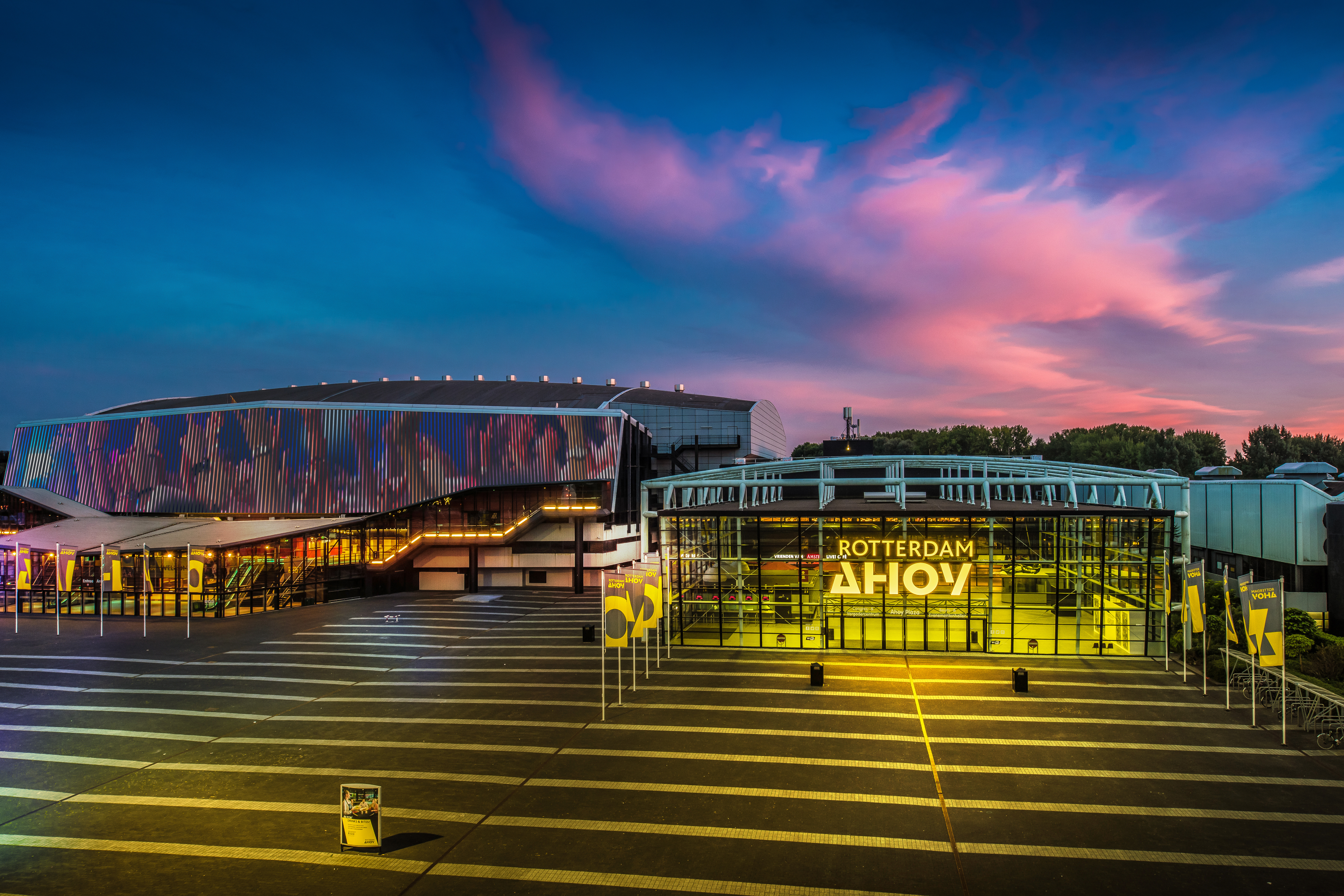
Roxen performed "Amnesia" at Rotterdam Ahoy (pictured) in Rotterdam on the first semi-final.

The Eurovision Song Contest 2021 took place at Rotterdam Ahoy in Rotterdam, Netherlands and had the Turquoise Carpet event as its opening ceremony, from which the Romanian delegation was forced to withdraw after a COVID-19 case was confirmed at the hotel they were staying. The contest consisted of two semi-finals on 18 and 20 May, and the final on 22 May 2021. In Romania, the shows on 18 and 22 May were watched by 138,000 and 178,000 viewers, respectively, and were aired on TVR with commentary by Bogdan Stănescu. Stanciu served as the country's head of delegation. Roxen was scheduled for technical rehearsals on 9 and 12 May. Her performance was directed by Păun and Manoliu, and was concepted to be similar to the music video of "Amnesia". Scîrlet was appointed as the musical director for Romania's show.

Throughout the performance, silhouettes "trying to break free from the screens" are featured on the LED backdrop as Roxen and five barefoot dancers execute an interpretive dance choreography; the singer wears a dress with a floral print and is seen fighting with the dancers, which represent their inner demons. As the performance progresses, the singer walks to the B-stage and the staging transitions from being smoke-filled and having a dark color scheme to showcasing warm colours such as orange, yellow and pink, and a sunrise on the LED screen. At the end, Roxen proceeds to fall down into the dancers as the message "for every shout that went unheard" is displayed.

According to Eurovision rules, each country, except the host country and the "Big Five" (France, Germany, Italy, Spain and the United Kingdom), is required to qualify from one of two semi-finals to compete for the final; the top ten countries from each semi-final progress to the final. In March 2021, it was announced that "Amnesia" would be performed 13th in the first semi-final of the contest, following Israel and preceding Azerbaijan. The results of the show were determined by a 50/50 combination of votes from each participating country's professional jury panel and public televote. Leading up to the first semi-final was a special rehearsal during which the juries had to cast their votes; Roxen experienced technical issues on that occasion and was eventually given the chance to perform again. A postcard video introduced Roxen's semi-final show, portraying a small house in Leeuwarden with books, personal pictures and a piano.

=== Voting ===
Below is a breakdown of points awarded to Romania in the first semi-final, as well as by the country on the latter occasion and in the Grand Final. The detailed results of the Romanian jury vote—made up of a combination between the individual rankings of DJ Andy, Luminița Anghel, Ilinca, Răzvan Popescu and Liviu Teodorescu—and televoting are also listed. In the first semi-final, Romania placed 12th with a total of 85 points, thus failing to qualify for the final; this stands as one of the country's worst results ever and their third non-qualification, consecutive to the previous ones. Romania received 27 televoting points, which included ten awarded by Italy. The jury points added to 58, including 12 from Malta and ten from Cyprus. Romania awarded its 12 points to Malta (jury) and Ukraine (televote) in the first semi-final, and to Malta (jury) and Moldova (televote) in the final. For the Grand Final jury points announcement, Cătălina Ponor was the Romanian spokesperson announcing the country's voting results.

==== Points awarded to Romania ====
Points awarded to Romania (Semi-final 1)
Score	Televote	Jury
12 points		Malta
10 points	Italy	Cyprus
8 points		
7 points		Azerbaijan; Ukraine
6 points		Germany
5 points	Azerbaijan; Cyprus	Belgium; Lithuania
4 points		
3 points	Ireland; Malta	Croatia
2 points		Norway
1 point	Belgium	Netherlands

==== Points awarded by Romania ====
Points awarded by Romania (Semi-final 1)
Score	Televote	Jury
12 points	Ukraine	Malta
10 points	Israel	Ukraine
8 points	Malta	Lithuania
7 points	Azerbaijan	Slovenia
6 points	Lithuania	North Macedonia
5 points	Russia	Russia
4 points	Cyprus	Sweden
3 points	Norway	Cyprus
2 points	North Macedonia	Australia
1 point	Belgium	Croatia

Points awarded by Romania (Final)
Score	Televote	Jury
12 points	Moldova	Malta
10 points	Italy	Portugal
8 points	France	Finland
7 points	Ukraine	Switzerland
6 points	Finland	Moldova
5 points	Switzerland	Ukraine
4 points	Azerbaijan	France
3 points	Lithuania	Italy
2 points	Malta	Bulgaria
1 point	Israel	Germany

==== Detailed voting results ====
Detailed voting results from Romania (Semi-final 1)
R/O	Country	Jury							Televote	
R/O	Country	Juror A	Juror B	Juror C	Juror D	Juror E	Rank	Points	Rank	Points
01	Lithuania	7	2	2	5	6	3	8	5	6
02	Slovenia	3	5	13	2	7	4	7	12	
03	Russia	14	6	6	8	2	6	5	6	5
04	Sweden	10	15	5	10	3	7	4	11	
05	Australia	15	3	8	9	15	9	2	15	
06	North Macedonia	4	4	10	4	8	5	6	9	2
07	Ireland	8	14	15	6	9	11		13	
08	Cyprus	12	13	4	7	5	8	3	7	4
09	Norway	11	12	12	14	14	15		8	3
10	Croatia	5	11	9	12	11	10	1	14	
11	Belgium	6	10	14	11	12	13		10	1
12	Israel	13	7	11	13	10	14		2	10
13	Romania									
14	Azerbaijan	9	9	7	15	13	12		4	7
15	Ukraine	2	8	3	3	4	2	10	1	12
16	Malta	1	1	1	1	1	1	12	3	8

Detailed voting results from Romania (Final)
R/O	Country	Jury							Televote	
R/O	Country	Juror A	Juror B	Juror C	Juror D	Juror E	Rank	Points	Rank	Points
01	Cyprus	16	20	8	13	19	17		16	
02	Albania	9	26	18	10	17	16		20	
03	Israel	8	16	19	12	10	11		10	1
04	Belgium	12	6	26	16	26	12		24	
05	Russia	23	22	9	19	12	19		18	
06	Malta	1	1	2	1	1	1	12	9	2
07	Portugal	2	3	4	2	4	2	10	22	
08	Serbia	13	25	22	23	11	22		11	
09	United Kingdom	17	23	24	17	22	25		25	
10	Greece	15	18	15	21	16	23		21	
11	Switzerland	11	8	1	22	2	4	7	6	5
12	Iceland	26	9	14	26	13	18		12	
13	Spain	24	14	25	8	23	20		19	
14	Moldova	5	5	10	5	7	5	6	1	12
15	Germany	20	10	12	7	15	10	1	23	
16	Finland	3	4	11	3	3	3	8	5	6
17	Bulgaria	10	15	13	4	6	9	2	14	
18	Lithuania	22	11	7	24	20	15		8	3
19	Ukraine	21	2	6	11	5	6	5	4	7
20	France	6	7	5	6	9	7	4	3	8
21	Azerbaijan	19	19	16	20	24	24		7	4
22	Norway	18	17	23	9	25	21		13	
23	Netherlands	7	21	17	15	14	14		26	
24	Italy	4	12	3	18	18	8	3	2	10
25	Sweden	14	13	21	14	8	13		15	
26	San Marino	25	24	20	25	21	26		17	

== After Eurovision ==
In an interview following Eurovision's first semi-final, Romania's head of delegation Stanciu stated that she believed one of the main reasons for the country's "failure" was Roxen's lack of experience. Boris Meersman of ESCUnited criticized Stanciu's statement, writing that she was "scapegoat[ing]" Roxen "when in reality the Romanian team as a whole failed". He furthermore criticized "Amnesia" as being a "poor" song that did not appeal to the audience, and stated that "Romania were at risk the second they picked their song, and ran it into the ground by making bad decisions throughout the process". While identifying Roxen's delivery and way of communicating the song's message onstage as an issue, Meersman praised the staging and saw artistic growth in Roxen; he concluded: "Roxen [...] did her best working with what she was given [...] [and did not] make [any] of the decisions autonomously [...]. [...] Romania's [non-qualification] was a group effort. Pray that they learn from their mistakes next time around".

As a response to Romania's "latest poor Eurovision results", broadcaster TVR held the two-hour-long televised debate Eurovision... pe șleau! ("Eurovision... frankly!") on 5 July 2021 to discuss possible mistakes that have led to the country's "failures in recent years". The programme included the participation of former Romanian Eurovision acts, as well as of Eurovision fans and professionals. Most of the panel members agreed on Roxen's lack of experience and criticized TVR's choice of delegating the song selection process to Global Records, while suggestions were made to collaborate with foreign stage directors for better results, and to return to the Selecția Națională national final format in 2022.
