= Ce-ți cântă dragostea =

2019 song by Roxen

Single by Roxen
- Language: Romanian
- Released: 12 November 2019
- Length: 3:13
- Label: Global
- Songwriter(s): Theea Miculescu; Andreea Moldovan; Roxen
- Producer(s): Mihai Alexandru Bogdan; Viky Red

Roxen singles chronology
"You Don't Love Me" (2019)	"Ce-ți cântă dragostea" (2019)	"Alcohol You" (2020)

"Ce-ți cântă dragostea" (English: "What does your love sing") is a song recorded by Romanian singer Roxen, digitally released by Global Records on 12 November 2019 as her debut single. It was written by Theea Miculescu, Andreea Moldovan and Roxen, while production was handled by Mihai Alexandru Bogdan and Viky Red. An accompanying music video for "Ce-ți cântă dragostea" was uploaded to YouTube simultaneously with the single's digital release, and was directed by Raluca Netca. Upon release, the song experienced commercial success in Romania, peaking at number one on the Airplay 100 chart.

== Background and release ==
"Ce-ți cântă dragostea" was written by Theea Miculescu, Andreea Moldovan and Roxen, and composed by the aforementioned alongside Mihai Alexandru Bogdan and Viky Red; the latter two produced the song. The track was released for digital download and streaming on 12 November 2019 by Global Records as Roxen's debut single. Additionally, several remixes and a live version were eventually made available.

== Music video and promotion ==
An accompanying music video for "Ce-ți cântă dragostea" was uploaded to Roxen's YouTube channel simultaneously with the song's digital release. It was directed by Raluca Netca, while Alexandru Mureșan was hired as the director of photography, Loops Production provided production and bmabid editing. For promotional purposes, Roxen performed the track live from November 2019 to March 2020 in Romania: at the Global Studios, on Pro FM, on Radio ZU, at La Măruță, and on Virgin Radio.

== Credits and personnel ==
Credits adapted from YouTube.

Technical and songwriting credits

- Mihai Alexandru Bogdan – composer, producer
- Theea Miculescu – composer, lyricist
- Andreea Moldovan – composer, lyricist
- Viky Red – composer, producer
- Roxen – composer, lyricist

Visual credits

- bmabid – editor
- Loops Production – production
- Alexandru Mureșan – director of photography
- Raluca Netca – director

== Track listing ==
- Digital download
1. "Ce-ți cântă dragostea" – 3:13
- Digital download (Alternative versions)
1. "Ce-ți cântă dragostea" (Andrew Maze Remix) – 3:41
2. "Ce-ți cântă dragostea" (Adrian Funk X OLiX Remix) – 3:05
3. "Ce-ți cântă dragostea" (Adrian Extended Mix) – 4:03
4. "Ce-ți cântă dragostea" (Arias Remix) – 3:09
5. "Ce-ți cântă dragostea" (Live) – 3:48
6. "Ce-ți cântă dragostea" (Manda Remix) – 4:13
7. "Ce-ți cântă dragostea" (Manda Extended Mix) – 5:06

== Charts ==
=== Weekly charts ===
Chart (2020)	Peak position
Romania (Airplay 100)	1
Romania (Romanian Radio Airplay)	1
Romania (Romania TV Airplay)	1

=== Year-end charts ===
Chart (2020)	Position
Romania (Airplay 100)	3

== Release history ==
Country	Date	Format(s)	Label	Ref.
Various	12 November 2019	Digital download; streaming	Global	

== See also ==
- List of Airplay 100 number ones of the 2020s
