= Roxen (singer) =

Romanian singer

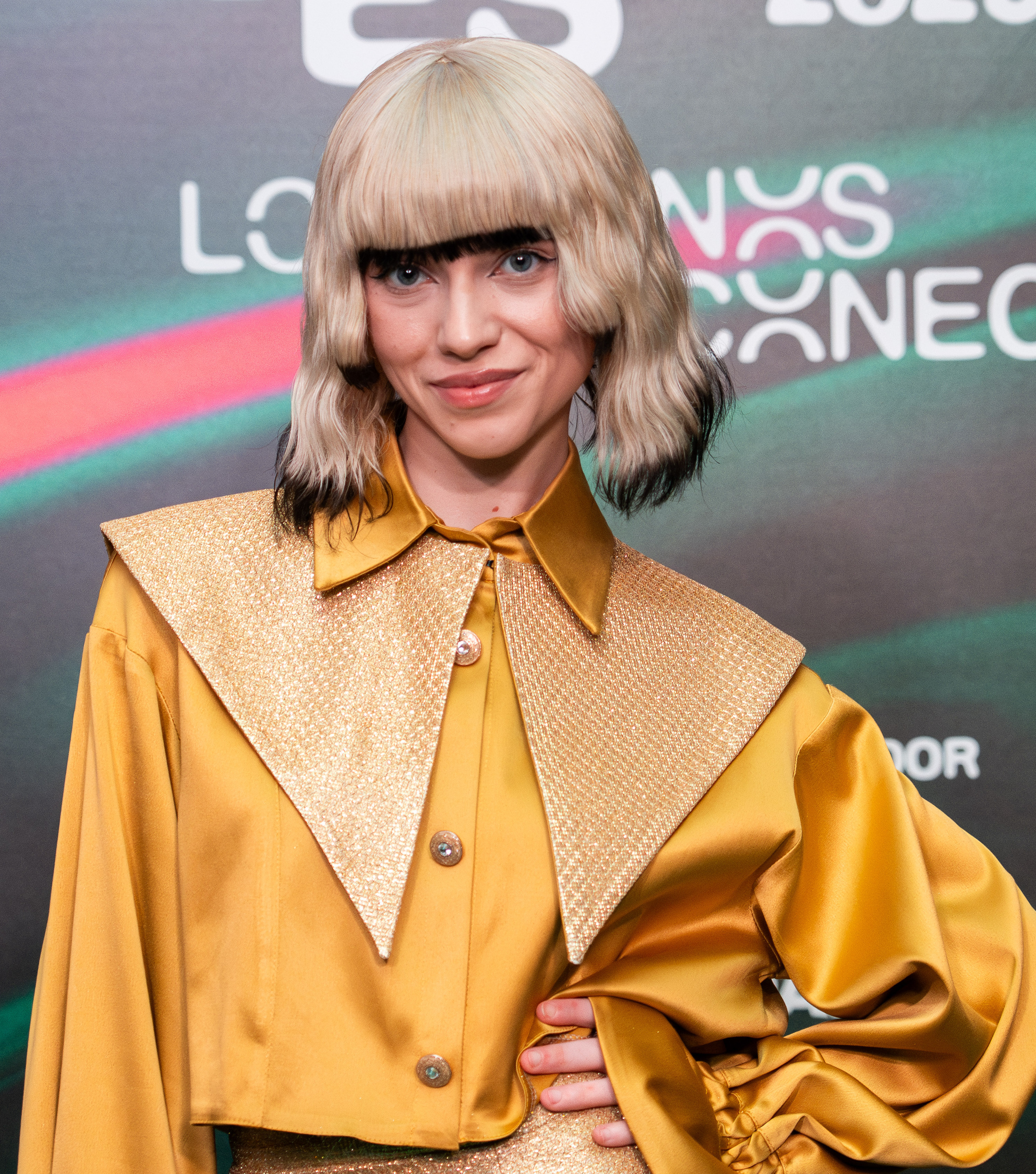
- Roxen in 2025
- Born: Larisa Roxana Giurgiu; 5 January 2000 (age 26); Cluj-Napoca, Romania
- Occupation: Singer-songwriter
- Years active: 2019–present
- Musical career
- Genres: Pop; Electropop; Dance-pop; Deep house
- Instruments: Vocals; Piano
- Labels: Global Records; Universal Music Romania

Larisa Roxana Giurgiu (Romanian pronunciation: [laˈrisa rokˈsana ˈdʒjurdʒju]; born 5 January 2000), known professionally as Roxen (pronounced [rokˈsen]), is a Romanian singer-songwriter. She (Note: Roxen came out as non-binary and has stated that she uses all pronouns. This article uses she/her for consistency.) rose to prominence in 2019 after featuring on Romanian producer Sickotoy's single "You Don't Love Me", which reached number three on Romania's Airplay 100 chart and received radio airplay in several other countries. Her subsequent singles "Ce-ți cântă dragostea" and "Spune-mi" both reached number one in Romania.

Roxen was selected to represent Romania at the Eurovision Song Contest 2020 with "Alcohol You", but the contest was cancelled due to the COVID-19 pandemic. She was subsequently internally selected to represent the country at the Eurovision Song Contest 2021 with "Amnesia", finishing 12th in the first semi-final and failing to qualify for the final.

== Early life ==
Larisa Roxana Giurgiu was born on 5 January 2000 in Cluj-Napoca, Romania. She first performed on stage at the age of five, when she entered and won a children's talent competition held at a local shopping centre. At the age of seven, she began taking singing and piano lessons and became more extensively involved in music. Between the ages of seven and sixteen, she participated in numerous music competitions and festivals, with her mother regularly enrolling her in such events.

Roxen later stated that she had initially had little interest in singing and was encouraged to pursue music by her parents, particularly her mother. Her father is an instrumentalist, and she has described his side of the family as having a musical background.

== Career ==
=== 2019–2020: Career beginnings and breakthrough ===
After signing with Global Records, Roxen was featured on Romanian producer Sickotoy's "You Don't Love Me" in August 2019. The song attained commercial success in Romania, reaching number three on the country's Airplay 100 chart, and was playlisted by radio stations in several territories, including France, the United States, Russia and Spain. Roxen's debut solo single, "Ce-ți cântă dragostea", was released in November 2019 and peaked at number one in Romania.

In early February 2020, Roxen was reported to be one of three artists shortlisted to represent Romania at the Eurovision Song Contest 2020, following a collaboration between broadcaster Romanian Television (TVR) and Global Records for the selection process. She was revealed as Romania's representative by TVR on 11 February.

The five songs competing in Selecția Națională—"Alcohol You", "Beautiful Disaster", "Cherry Red", "Colors" and "Storm"—were released on 21 February. "Alcohol You" was selected as the winning entry on 1 March. However, on 18 March, the European Broadcasting Union (EBU) announced the cancellation of the contest due to the COVID-19 pandemic. Although TVR considered retaining "Alcohol You" for the Eurovision Song Contest 2021, the EBU subsequently announced that the intended 2020 entries would not be eligible for the following year's contest. Roxen was nonetheless internally selected to represent Romania again in 2021.

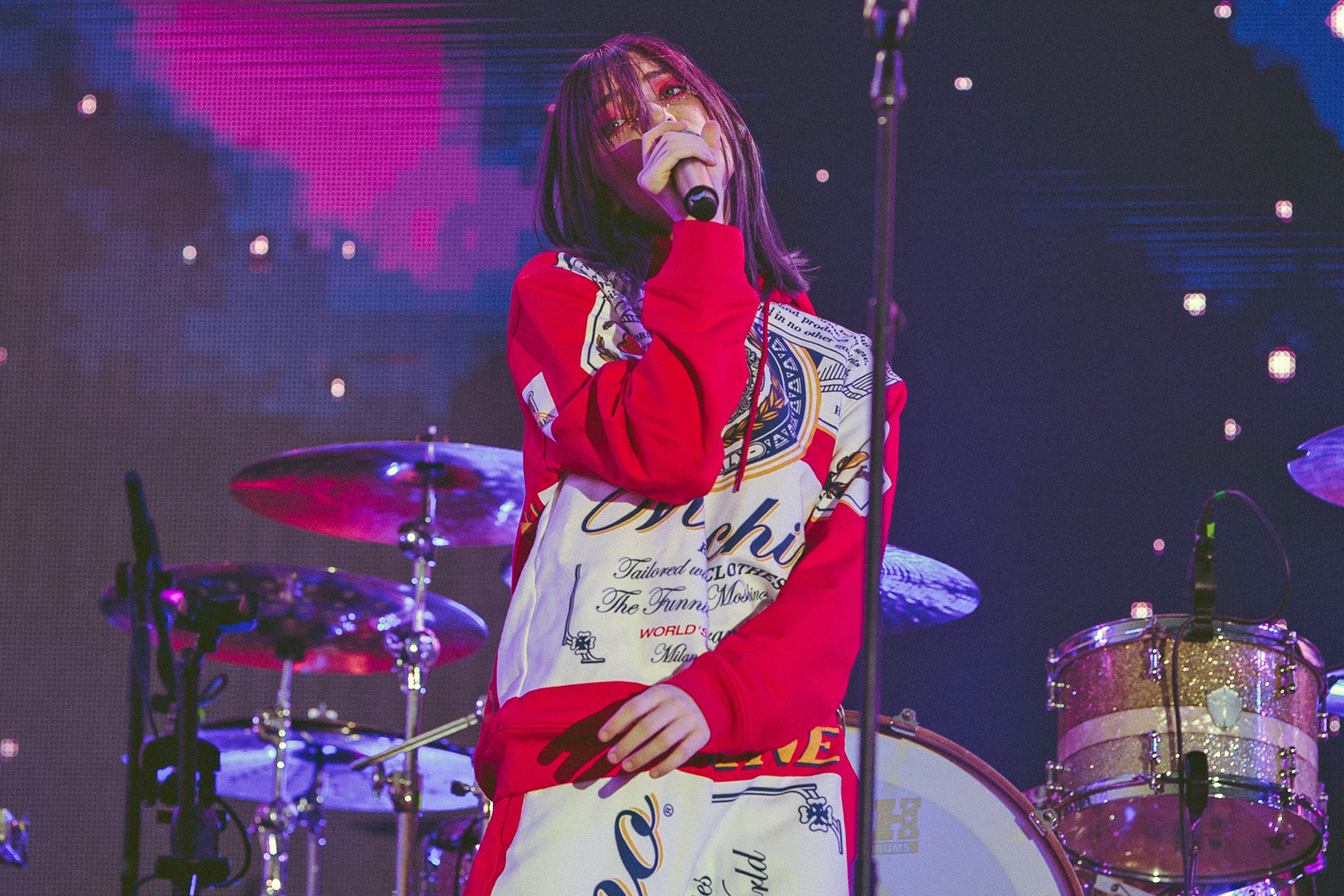
Roxen performing in 2020

In June 2020, Roxen became a brand ambassador for Romanian hair-colour product Loncolor Expert HEMPstyle, appearing on the product's packaging and in a commercial that prominently featured "Storm". Beginning with the release of "How to Break a Heart" in July, her music benefited from a promotional campaign resulting from a partnership between Global Records and Warner Music. In October, Roxen scored her second number-one single on the Airplay 100 with "Spune-mi".

=== 2021–2022: Eurovision and commercial success ===
"Amnesia" was selected by an internal jury as Roxen's entry for the Eurovision Song Contest 2021 and was released on 4 March. She performed the song in the contest's first semi-final on 18 May, where she finished in 12th place with 85 points and failed to qualify for the final.

Roxen subsequently achieved further commercial success with several collaborations. By January 2022, "Money Money" (2021), a collaboration with DMNDS and Strange Fruits Music, had reached the top ten on music charts in the Commonwealth of Independent States (CIS) and Russia. "Dincolo de Marte" (2021), a collaboration with Randi, peaked at number two in Romania in April 2022. "UFO", which had placed second behind "Amnesia" in the selection of Romania's Eurovision 2021 entry, reached number two on the Polish music charts and received a gold certification from the Polish Society of the Phonographic Industry.

=== 2023–2024: Further releases and Alternative Dreams ===
In 2023, Roxen released several singles, including "Fato", a collaboration with Sapte, "Cenușă" and "Infinit". "Cenușă" was subsequently issued in several alternative and remixed versions.

In April 2024, she released "Sărută-mă", which she wrote herself. Her first extended play, Alternative Dreams, followed on 10 May 2024 through Global Records and Warner Music Poland. The seven-track record features songs in both Romanian and English and explores themes including love, loss and self-discovery. Later that year, Roxen collaborated with David Ciente and Damian Drăghici on "Lasă-mă", and with Liviu Teodorescu on "Nu pleca".

=== 2025: Universal Music and stylistic shift ===
In early 2025, Roxen began a recording partnership with Universal Music Romania. Her first single with the label, "Save You", was released on 7 March. Described as a shift from her previous pop and pop-dance material towards electronic dance music, the song was co-written by Roxen, Andres Kopper and Christina Kerschner. Several remixes and alternative versions followed.

In May, Roxen released "Favourite Type" as her second single with Universal Music. Co-written with producer Naitumela Masuku, professionally known as Jungleboi, the song incorporates pop and reggae influences. A collection of remixes was released later that year.

=== 2026–present: Subsequent releases ===
In February 2026, Roxen released "Nu pot să te repar", which she wrote and composed herself. The single was released to digital streaming platforms on 3 March without a record label credited in its copyright metadata.

In May 2026, Roxen uploaded the song "Amândoi" to her SoundCloud account.

== Artistry ==
Music critics have described Roxen's music primarily as deep house, while her musical style and appearance have been compared to those of Dua Lipa and Billie Eilish. In an interview with București FM, Roxen cited Beyoncé as a major musical influence.

== Personal life ==
At the age of 14, Roxen was diagnosed with lyme disease. She is vegetarian. As of June 2020, she resides in Bucharest. At the beginning of the same month, she was allegedly emotionally abused and blackmailed by an ex-boyfriend and obtained a restraining order against him after having made a complaint to the local police. In July 2021, the singer came out as non-binary in a TikTok video, and eventually clarified that she identifies with all pronouns. Roxen furthermore stated: "Since I was little, I feel like a boy in a girl's body. In my previous life I was really a boy". However, in 2024, along with her endorsement of pro-Russian and far-right Romanian presidential candidate Călin Georgescu, she stated that she felt manipulated by the LGBTQ community.

== Discography ==
=== Singles ===
==== As lead artist ====
List of singles as lead artist, with selected chart positions and certifications
Title	Year	Peak chart positions						Certifications	Album
Title	Year	ROM Air. (Note: Uniunea Producătorilor de Fonograme din România began publishing charts in November 2021 and their charts are taken into consideration for Romanian peaks after the Airplay 100's cancellation in the same month. For peaks below Top 10 TopHit charts are used.)	CIS Air.	LTU	NLD Tip	POL Air.	RUS Air.	Certifications	Album
"Ce-ți cântă dragostea"	2019	1	—	—	—	—	—		Non-album singles
"Alcohol You"	2020	—	—	—	—	—	—		Non-album singles
"Spune-mi"	2020	1	—	—	—	—	—		Non-album singles
"How to Break a Heart"	2020	—	—	—	—	—	—		Non-album singles
"Wonderland" (with Alexander Rybak)	2020	—	—	—	—	—	—		Non-album singles
"Parte din tine" (with DJ Project)	2021	9	—	—	—	—	—		Non-album singles
"Amnesia"	2021	—	—	51	26	—	—		Non-album singles
"Inimă nu fi de piatră"	2021	51	—	—	—	—	—		Non-album singles
"Money Money" (with DMNDS and Strange Fruits Music)	2021	—	7	—	—	—	3		Non-album singles
"Strada ta" (with Nane)	2021	—	—	—	—	—	—		Non-album singles
"Crazy Valorant" (with Killa Fonic)	2021	—	—	—	—	—	—		Non-album singles
"Dincolo de Marte" (with Randi)	2021	2	98	—	—	—	—		Non-album singles
"UFO"	2022	—	—	—	—	2	—	ZPAV: Gold	Non-album singles
"Printre stele"	2022	—	—	—	—	—	—		Non-album singles
"Ghost" (with Mausio)	2022	—	—	—	—	—	—		Non-album singles
"Biggest Idiot"	2022	—	—	—	—	—	—		Non-album singles
"Fool"	2022	—	—	—	—	—	—		Non-album singles
"Enemies" (with Selin)	2022	—	—	—	—	—	—		Non-album singles
"Fato" (with Sapte)	2023	—	—	—	—	—	—		Non-album singles
"Infinit"	2023	—	—	—	—	—	—		Non-album singles
"În inimă Crăciun"	2023	—	—	—	—	—	—		Non-album singles
"Saruta-ma"	2024	—	—	—	—	—	—		Non-album singles
"Lasă-mă"	2024	—	—	—	—	—			Non-album singles
"Save You"	2025	—	—	—	—	—	—		Non-album singles
"Favourite Type"	2025	69	—	—	—	—	—		Non-album singles
"—" denotes a title that did not chart, or was not released in that territory.

==== As featured artist ====
List of singles as featured artist, with selected chart positions
Title	Year	Peak chart positions			Album
Title	Year	ROM Air.	BUL Air.	MDA Air.	Album
"You Don't Love Me" (Sickotoy featuring Roxen)	2019	3	7	29	Non-album singles
"Over and Over" (PAX featuring Roxen)	2020	—	—	*	Non-album singles
"Devil in Disguise" (Coyot featuring uncredited vocals by Roxen)	2020	—	—	*	Non-album singles
"—" denotes a title that did not chart, or was not released in that territory. "*" denotes that the chart did not exist at that time.

==== Promotional singles ====
List of promotional singles
Title	Year	Album
"I Don't Care"	2019	Non-album singles
"Beautiful Disaster"	2020	Non-album singles
"Cherry Red"	2020	Non-album singles
"Colors"	2020	Non-album singles
"Storm"	2020	Non-album singles
"Escape"	2020	Non-album singles
"Nono Bad"	2022	Non-album singles

=== Guest appearances ===
List of guest appearances
Title	Year	Album
"Nu dorm" (Nane featuring Roxen)	2022	Cordial
"Cenușăreasa" (OG Eastbull featuring Roxen)	2022	Foame și ambiție

=== Music videos ===
List of music videos
Title (Note: Solely lists official music videos.)	Year	Lead performer(s)	Guest performer(s)	Director(s)
"You Don't Love Me"	2019	Sickotoy	Roxen	Raluca Netca
"Ce-ți cântă dragostea"	2019	Roxen	None	Raluca Netca
"I Don't Care"	2019	Roxen	None	Șerban Racovițeanu
"Over and Over"	2020	PAX	Roxen	Alex Mureșan
"Escape"	2020	Roxen	None	Alex Mureșan
"Spune-mi"	2020	Roxen	None	Anton San
"How to Break a Heart"	2020	Roxen	None	Anton San
"Wonderland"	2020	Roxen / Alexander Rybak	None	Raluca Netca
"Parte din tine"	2021	Roxen / DJ Project	None	Kobzzon
"Amnesia"	2021	Roxen	None	Bogdan Păun
"Inimă nu fi de piatră"	2021	Roxen	None	Kobzzon
"Money Money"	2021	Roxen / DMNDS / Strange Fruits Music	None	Isabella Szanto / Roberto Stan / Loops Production
"Dincolo de Marte"	2021	Randi / Roxen	None	Ionuț Trandafir
"Crazy Valorant"	2021	Killa Fonic / Roxen	None	Bogdan Păun
"Printre stele"	2022	Roxen	None	Bogdan Păun
"Ghost"	2022	Mausio / Roxen	None	Fati.TV
"Biggest Idiot"	2022	Roxen	None	David Mogan
"Fool"	2022	Roxen	None	Cristina Poszet / Andra Marta

== Notes ==
Awards and achievements
Preceded by Ester Peony with "On a Sunday"	Romania in the Eurovision Song Contest; 2020 (cancelled)	Succeeded by Herself with "Amnesia"
Preceded by Herself with "Alcohol You"	Romania in the Eurovision Song Contest; 2021	Succeeded by WRS with "Llámame"
