= Romania in the Eurovision Song Contest 2020 =

Competition group

- Eurovision Song Contest 2020
- Participating broadcaster: Televiziunea Română (TVR)
- Country: Romania
- Selection process: Artist: Internal selection Song: Selecția Națională 2020
- Selection date: Artist: 11 February 2020; Song: 1 March 2020

Competing entry
- Song: "Alcohol You"
- Artist: Roxen
- Songwriters: Ionuț Armaș; Viky Red; Breyan Isaac

Placement
- Final result: Contest cancelled

Participation chronology

Romania was set to be represented at the Eurovision Song Contest 2020 with the song "Alcohol You", written by Ionuț Armaș, Viky Red, and Breyan Isaac, and performed by Roxen. The Romanian participating broadcaster, Televiziunea Română (TVR), selected its entry through the national final Selecția Națională 2020, after having previously selected the performer internally. TVR announced Roxen on 11 February 2020, while the national selection competition took place on 1 March.

Prior to the scheduled Eurovision Song Contest 2020, "Alcohol You" was promoted by a lyric video, while Roxen appeared on several native talk shows and radio stations. Romania was drawn to compete in the first semi-final of the Eurovision Song Contest which would have taken place on 12 May 2020. However, the contest was cancelled due to the COVID-19 pandemic.

== Background ==
Prior to the 2020 contest, Televiziunea Română (TVR) had participated in the Eurovision Song Contest representing Romania 20 times since its first entry in 1994. Its highest placing in the contest, to this point, had been third place, achieved on two occasions: in 2005 with the song "Let Me Try" performed by Luminița Anghel and Sistem, and in 2010 with the song "Playing with Fire" performed by Paula Seling and Ovi. In 2019, Romania failed to qualify to the final, placing 13th in the second semi-final with "On a Sunday" by Ester Peony. This marked the second consecutive time that they failed to qualify to the final since the introduction of semi-finals in 2004, after 2018.

In September 2019, TVR confirmed its participation in the 2020 contest. As of December 2019, the broadcaster was discussing the method to select a representing entry, which evolved as the subject of online controversy since precise information surrounding its Eurovision participation had been given that time in preceding years. In addition, the mayors of Baia Mare and Buzău claimed the cities were potential hosts of a national final that was yet to be confirmed by TVR.

== Before Eurovision ==
=== Artist selection ===
Logo for Romania's 2020 Eurovision participation, with the slogan "E altceva" (Romanian: "It's something different").

On 31 January 2020, TVR confirmed its collaboration with native label Global Records for the selection of a Eurovision entry, citing their recent relevancy and success within Romania's music industry as reasons for the decision. Furthermore, it was announced that Liana Stanciu would return as the country's head of delegation. While Global Records was not remunerated, the project had cost TVR a reported €69,000. A jury panel—consisting of Luminița Anghel, Liviu Elekes, Dan Manoliu, Crina Mardare, Bogdan Păun, Lucian Ștefan and Andrei Tudor—was hired to select Romania's representing artist out of the label's roster. Having brought together several composers such as David Ciente, a songwriting camp was organised in January 2020, with the five best-written songs being selected by music experts to proceed to Selecția Națională 2020. The segment Destinația Eurovision was aired by TVR, documenting the internal artist selection and songwriting camp.

In an online interview two days after TVR's announcement, Global Records's manager Ștefan announced that a male and two female artists had been shortlisted to represent Romania at Eurovision; they were later reported to be Cezar Gună, Diana V and Roxen. The latter was revealed as Romania's representative on 11 February, and the competing songs were released on 21 February. Roxen had risen to prominence in the country upon being featured on producer Sickotoy's "You Don't Love Me" in 2019, which reached number three on the Airplay 100 chart and was playlisted in several other territories.

=== Selecția Națională 2020 ===
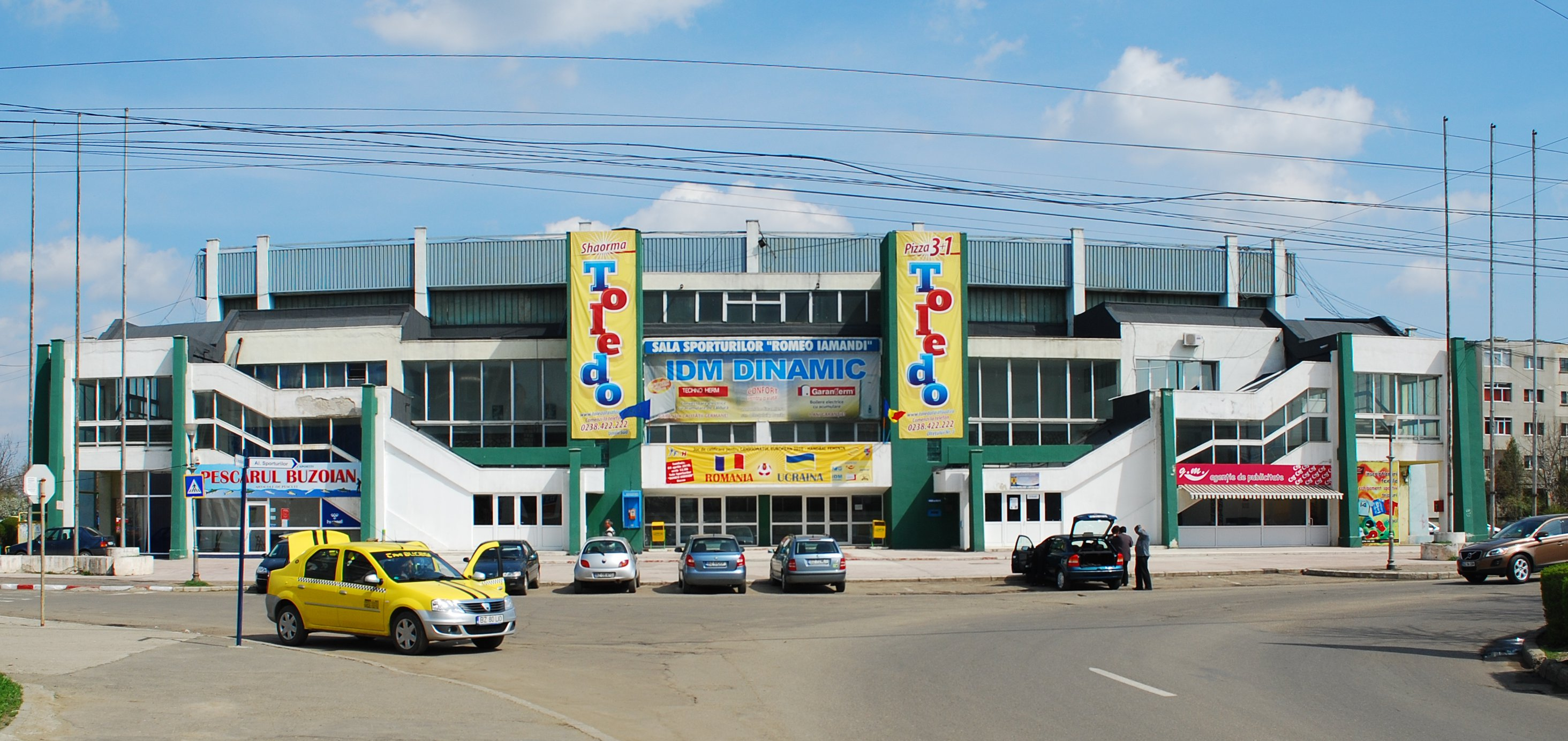
Sala Sporturilor "Romeo Iamandi" in Buzău (pictured in 2010).

Selecția Națională 2020 was the national final format organised by TVR in order to select its entry for the Eurovision Song Contest 2020. The competition consisted of five songs—"Alcohol You", "Beautiful Disaster", "Cherry Red", "Colors" and "Storm"—out of which the winner was determined by a 50/50 combination of votes from a jury panel and a public televote (the latter would decide the winning song in case of a tie). The jury—consisting of Luminița Anghel, Crina Mardare, Alin Oprea, Edward Sanda and Andrei Tudor—awarded a set of points from five to zero, which was based on each member's individual set of votes from five to zero. The televoting was rendered down using the same scores.

With an audience of around 200,000 viewers, Selecția Națională was broadcast at 21:00 (EET) and hosted by Elena Gheorghe and Connect-R at Sala Sporturilor "Romeo Iamandi" in Buzău. The hosts also served as interval acts alongside Loreen, Sandro Nicolas, Ulrikke Brandstorp, Dora Gaitanovici and Natalia Gordienco. Roxen's performances were directed by Bogdan Păun with the assistance of the director of photography Dan Manoliu, and made use of a circular stage and a LED screen sized around 300 square metres (3,200 sq ft). CocoRico, Cotnari and Top Line were among the sponsors of the event, while Buzău itself contributed with €200,000 towards it. Writing for Eurovision.de, Irving Wolther lauded Selecția Națională, calling it "so opulent that one might think that a future [Eurovision] winner is actually celebrating here". The full results of the national final were:

Selecția Națională 2020 – 1 March 2020
R/O	Song	Songwriter(s)	Jury	Televote	Total	Place
1	"Beautiful Disaster"	Breyan Isaac; Alexandru Cotoi; Julie Frost	0	0	0	5
2	"Cherry Red"	Sebastian Barac; Marcel Botezan; Theea Miculescu; Costel Domințeanu	1	2	3	3
3	"Colors"	Breyan Isaac; Alexandru Cotoi; Julie Frost	2	1	3	4
4	"Alcohol You"	Ionuț Armaș; Viky Red; Breyan Isaac	5	5	10	1
5	"Storm"	Minelli; Viky Red	3	3	6	2

=== Promotion ===
Prior to Selecția Națională, Roxen was promoted as Romania's Eurovision representative on various native talk shows and radio stations, occasionally performing one of the five songs. Lyric videos to all entries were released on YouTube, eventually alongside "alternative" live versions (Crystal Freckles Session). Additionally, Global Records released merchandise related to Roxen. Upon selecting "Alcohol You" as the Romanian entry, Roxen performed it live on Virgin Radio Romania, and appeared on multiple other Romanian radio stations to give interviews.

== At Eurovision ==
The Eurovision Song Contest 2020 was originally scheduled to take place at Rotterdam Ahoy in Rotterdam, Netherlands and consist of two semi-finals on 12 and 14 May, and the final on 16 May 2020. According to Eurovision rules, each country, except the host nation and the "Big Five" (France, Germany, Italy, Spain and the United Kingdom), would have been required to qualify from one of two semi-finals to compete for the final; the top ten countries from each semi-final would have progressed to the final. In January 2020, it was announced that Romania would be performing in the second half of the first semi-final of the contest. However, on 18 March, the European Broadcasting Union (EBU) announced the event's cancellation due to the pandemic of the coronavirus disease 2019 (COVID-19) in China and its spread to other countries. Although TVR had considered sending "Alcohol You" to participate in the Eurovision Song Contest 2021, EBU announced soon after that entries intended for 2020 would not be eligible for the following year. Roxen was nonetheless internally selected for 2021.

=== Alternative song contests ===
Some of the broadcasters scheduled to take part in the Eurovision Song Contest 2020 have organised alternative competitions. Austria's ORF aired Der kleine Song Contest in April 2020, which saw every entry being assigned to one of three semi-finals. A jury consisting of ten singers that had represented Austria at Eurovision before was hired to rank each song; the best-placed in each semi-final advanced to the final round. In the first semi-final on 14 April, "Alcohol You" placed seventh in a field of 14 participants, achieving 61 points. The song also unsuccessfully took part in Norddeutscher Rundfunk's Eurovision 2020 – das deutsche Finale and Sveriges Television's Sveriges 12:a on 9 May.
