= Ireland in the Eurovision Song Contest 2021 =

- Eurovision Song Contest 2021
- Participating broadcaster: Raidió Teilifís Éireann (RTÉ)
- Country: Ireland
- Selection process: Internal selection
- Announcement date: Artist: 17 December 2020; Song: 26 February 2021

Competing entry
- Song: "Maps"
- Artist: Lesley Roy
- Songwriters: Lesley Roy; Lukas Hällgren; Emelie Eriksson; Philip Strand

Placement
- Semi-final result: Failed to qualify (16th)

Participation chronology

Ireland was represented at the Eurovision Song Contest 2021 with the song "Maps", written by Lesley Roy, Lukas Hällgren, Emelie Eriksson, and Philip Strand, and performed by Roy herself. The Irish participating broadcaster, Raidió Teilifís Éireann (RTÉ), internally selected its entry for the contest. Roy was due to compete in the 2020 contest with "Story of My Life" before the event's cancellation. "Maps" failed to qualify for the grand finale, placing last in the semi-final with 20 points.

== Background ==
Prior to the 2021 Raidió Teilifís Éireann (RTÉ) and its predecessor national broadcasters, had participated in the Eurovision Song Contest representing Ireland 52 times since RÉ's first entry in 1965. Ireland has won the contest a record seven times in total. The country's first win came in 1970, with then-18-year-old Dana winning with "All Kinds of Everything". Ireland holds the record for being the only country to win the contest three times in a row (in 1992, 1993 and 1994), as well as having the only three-time winner (Johnny Logan, who won in 1980 as a singer, 1987 as a singer-songwriter, and again in 1992 as a songwriter). In 2011 and 2012, Jedward represented the nation for two consecutive years, managing to qualify to the final both times and achieve Ireland's highest position in the contest since 2000, placing eighth in 2011 with the song "Lipstick". However, in 2013, despite managing to qualify to the final, Ryan Dolan and his song "Only Love Survives" placed last in the final. The Irish entries from 2014 to 2017 all failed to qualify for the final. Ireland once again qualified for the final in 2018 with the song Together performed by Ryan O'Shaughnessy, placing 16th in the grand final. However, in 2019, Ireland once again failed to qualify for the final, placing last in the second semi-final with Sarah McTernan and the song "22".

== Before Eurovision ==
=== Internal selection ===
On 17 December 2020, RTÉ announced that they had again internally selected Lesley Roy to represent Ireland in Rotterdam. The song, entitled "Maps", was released on 26 February 2021. The song was written by Roy, Lukas Hällgren, Philip Strand and Emelie Eriksson.

== At Eurovision ==
According to Eurovision rules, all nations with the exceptions of the host country and the "Big Five" (France, Germany, Italy, Spain and the United Kingdom) are required to qualify from one of two semi-finals in order to compete in the final; the top ten countries from each semi-final progress to the final. The European Broadcasting Union (EBU) split up the competing countries into six different pots based on voting patterns from previous contests, with countries with favourable voting histories put into the same pot. For the 2021 contest, the semi-final allocation draw held for 2020 which was held on 28 January 2020, was used. Ireland was placed into the first semi-final, which was held on 18 May 2021, and performed in the first half of the show.

Once all the competing songs for the 2021 contest had been released, the running order for the semi-finals was decided by the shows' producers rather than through another draw, so that similar songs were not placed next to each other. Ireland was set to perform in position 7, following the entry from North Macedonia and preceding the entry from Cyprus.

=== Voting ===
Voting during the three shows involved each country awarding two sets of points from 1-8, 10 and 12: one from their professional jury and the other from televoting. Each nation's jury consisted of five music industry professionals who are citizens of the country they represent, with a diversity in gender and age represented. The judges assess each entry based on the performances during the second Dress Rehearsal of each show, which takes place the night before each live show, against a set of criteria including: vocal capacity; the stage performance; the song's composition and originality; and the overall impression by the act. Jury members may only take part in panel once every three years, and are obliged to confirm that they are not connected to any of the participating acts in a way that would impact their ability to vote impartially. Jury members should also vote independently, with no discussion of their vote permitted with other jury members. The exact composition of the professional jury, and the results of each country's jury and televoting were released after the grand final; the individual results from each jury member were also released in an anonymised form.

==== Points awarded to Ireland ====
Points awarded to Ireland (Semi-final 1)
Score	Televote	Jury
12 points		
10 points		
8 points		
7 points		
6 points		
5 points		
4 points		
3 points		Australia; Azerbaijan; Belgium
2 points	Australia	Cyprus; Malta
1 point	Lithuania; Malta	Italy; Norway; Sweden

==== Points awarded by Ireland ====
Points awarded by Ireland (Semi-final 1)
Score	Televote	Jury
12 points	Lithuania	Malta
10 points	Malta	Croatia
8 points	Ukraine	Russia
7 points	Croatia	Azerbaijan
6 points	Cyprus	Ukraine
5 points	Israel	Lithuania
4 points	Sweden	Cyprus
3 points	Romania	Norway
2 points	Norway	North Macedonia
1 point	Russia	Sweden

Points awarded by Ireland (Final)
Score	Televote	Jury
12 points	Lithuania	France
10 points	Iceland	Malta
8 points	Ukraine	Iceland
7 points	France	Norway
6 points	Italy	Ukraine
5 points	Finland	Switzerland
4 points	Malta	Lithuania
3 points	Switzerland	Belgium
2 points	Portugal	Azerbaijan
1 point	Sweden	Bulgaria

==== Detailed voting results ====
The following members comprised the Irish jury:

- Karl Broderick
- Louise Bruton
- Fidelma Kelly
- Sarah McTernan (jury member in semi-final 1)
- Luan Parle (jury member in the final)
- Ben Pyne

Detailed voting results from Ireland (Semi-final 1)
R/O	Country	Jury							Televote	
R/O	Country	Juror A	Juror B	Juror C	Juror D	Juror E	Rank	Points	Rank	Points
01	Lithuania	15	3	7	5	5	6	5	1	12
02	Slovenia	10	9	13	15	13	14		15	
03	Russia	5	2	10	8	2	3	8	10	1
04	Sweden	13	15	9	4	6	10	1	7	4
05	Australia	9	14	11	10	3	11		13	
06	North Macedonia	1	11	15	9	14	9	2	14	
07	Ireland									
08	Cyprus	12	7	5	3	7	7	4	5	6
09	Norway	2	10	4	11	15	8	3	9	2
10	Croatia	8	1	2	2	8	2	10	4	7
11	Belgium	7	8	14	12	10	13		12	
12	Israel	11	12	6	7	9	12		6	5
13	Romania	14	13	12	13	11	15		8	3
14	Azerbaijan	6	5	3	6	4	4	7	11	
15	Ukraine	4	6	1	14	12	5	6	3	8
16	Malta	3	4	8	1	1	1	12	2	10

Detailed voting results from Ireland (Final)
R/O	Country	Jury							Televote	
R/O	Country	Juror A	Juror B	Juror C	Juror D	Juror E	Rank	Points	Rank	Points
01	Cyprus	13	13	5	9	24	13		13	
02	Albania	25	24	24	26	19	26		26	
03	Israel	22	20	20	15	9	20		20	
04	Belgium	14	5	26	22	2	8	3	24	
05	Russia	12	8	6	21	14	15		14	
06	Malta	6	2	9	1	5	2	10	7	4
07	Portugal	7	11	23	13	6	12		9	2
08	Serbia	16	16	21	19	12	22		18	
09	United Kingdom	20	22	17	25	10	23		21	
10	Greece	17	14	8	7	7	11		19	
11	Switzerland	1	7	12	8	17	6	5	8	3
12	Iceland	2	6	2	3	16	3	8	2	10
13	Spain	10	21	13	23	26	21		25	
14	Moldova	21	26	22	11	25	25		15	
15	Germany	8	25	25	16	15	19		16	
16	Finland	19	17	19	12	22	24		6	5
17	Bulgaria	15	19	16	6	4	10	1	11	
18	Lithuania	26	3	10	5	11	7	4	1	12
19	Ukraine	3	12	1	20	23	5	6	3	8
20	France	9	1	18	2	1	1	12	4	7
21	Azerbaijan	11	9	3	10	13	9	2	22	
22	Norway	4	15	4	4	8	4	7	12	
23	Netherlands	5	18	7	18	20	14		23	
24	Italy	24	4	15	24	21	17		5	6
25	Sweden	18	23	14	17	3	16		10	1
26	San Marino	23	10	11	14	18	18		17	
