= Lithuania in the Eurovision Song Contest 2021 =

- Eurovision Song Contest 2021
- Country: Lithuania
- Selection process: Pabandom iš naujo! 2021
- Selection date: 6 February 2021

Competing entry
- Song: "Discoteque"
- Artist: The Roop
- Songwriters: Vaidotas Valiukevičius; Robertas Baranauskas; Mantas Banišauskas; Laisvūnas Černovas; Kalle Lindroth; Ilkka Wirtanen

Placement
- Semi-final result: Qualified (4th, 203 points)
- Final result: 8th, 220 points

Participation chronology

Lithuania was represented at the Eurovision Song Contest 2021 with the song "Discoteque", written by Vaidotas Valiukevičius, Robertas Baranauskas, Mantas Banišauskas, Laisvūnas Černovas, Kalle Lindroth, and Ilkka Wirtanen. The song was performed by the band The Roop. The Lithuanian broadcaster Lithuanian National Radio and Television (LRT) organised the national final Pabandom iš naujo! 2021 (Let's try again! 2021) in order to select the Lithuanian entry for the 2021 contest in Rotterdam, Netherlands. The national final took place over four weeks and involved 21 competing entries. The results of each show were determined by the combination of votes from a jury panel and a public vote. In the final, six artists and songs remained, and "Discoteque", performed by the Roop, was selected as the winner.

Lithuania was drawn to compete in the first semi-final of the Eurovision Song Contest which took place on 18 May 2021. Performing as the opening entry for the show in position 1, "Discoteque" was announced among the top 10 entries of the first semi-final and therefore qualified to compete in the final on 22 May. It was later revealed that Lithuania placed fourth out of the 16 participating countries in the semi-final with 203 points. In the final, Lithuania performed in position 18 and placed eighth out of the 26 participating countries, scoring 220 points.

== Background ==
Prior to the 2021 Contest, Lithuania had participated in the Eurovision Song Contest twenty times since its first entry in 1994. The nation's best placing in the contest was sixth, which it achieved in 2006 with the song "We Are the Winners", performed by LT United. Following the introduction of semi-finals for the 2004, Lithuania, to this point, had managed to qualify to the final nine times. In the 2019 contest, "Run with the Lions" performed by Jurij Veklenko failed to qualify to the final.

For the 2021 contest, the Lithuanian national broadcaster, Lithuanian National Radio and Television (LRT), broadcast the event within Lithuania and organised the selection process for the nation's entry. Other than the internal selection of their debut entry in 1994, Lithuania has selected their entry consistently through a national final procedure. LRT confirmed their intentions to participate at the 2021 Eurovision Song Contest on 31 March 2020 and announced the organization of Pabandom iš naujo!, which would be the national final to select Lithuania's entry for Rotterdam.

== Before Eurovision ==
=== Pabandom iš naujo! 2021 ===
Pabandom iš naujo! 2021 (Let's try again! 2021) was the national final format developed by LRT in order to select Lithuania's entry for the Eurovision Song Contest 2021. The competition involved a six-week-long process that commenced on 16 January 2021 and concluded with a winning song and artist on 6 February 2021. The four shows took place at the LRT studios in Vilnius and were hosted by Ieva Stasiulevičiūtė and Vytautas Rumšas, with Vaidas Baumila hosting segments from the green room. The shows were broadcast on LRT televizija, LRT Lituanica and LRT Radijas, as well as online via the broadcaster's website lrt.lt.

==== Format ====
The 2021 competition involved 21 entries and consisted of four shows. 20 of the entries participated in the first two shows which were the heats. Each heat consisted of 10 entries and the top five from each heat advanced to the competition's semi-final. In the semi-final, five entries were eliminated and the top five proceeded to the final. The entry entered by the Roop, which were to represent Lithuania at the Eurovision Song Contest 2020 before the event's cancellation due to the COVID-19 pandemic in Europe, competed directly in the final during which the winner was selected from the remaining six entries.

The results of each of the four shows were determined by the 50/50 combination of votes from a jury panel and public televoting. The ranking developed by both streams of voting was converted to points from 1-8, 10 and 12 and assigned based on the number of competing songs in the respective show. The public could vote through telephone and SMS voting. Ties in all shows were decided in favour of the entry that received the most points from the jury.

==== Competing entries ====
On 31 March 2020, LRT opened two separate submission forms: one for artists and another for songwriters to submit their songs. Artists that applied to compete with a song were required to indicate which song they wanted to compete with on their application. The submission deadline for both applications concluded on 14 December 2020. On 3 January 2020, LRT announced the 22 artists selected for the competition. Among the artists were previous Lithuanian Eurovision contestants Evelina Sašenko, who represented Lithuania in 2011, Sunday Afternoon (Vilija Matačiūnaitė), who represented the nation in 2014, and the Roop, which were to represent the nation in 2020 before the contest was cancelled. The nine-member jury panel that selected the competing entries consisted of Gytis Oganauskas (LRT deputy director general), Audrius Giržadas (LRT televizija chief producer), Ramūnas Zilnys (LRT pop music editor-in-chief), Darius Užkuraitis (LRT Opus senior editor), Giedrius Masalskis (Head of LRT's radio programs department), Rūta Putnikienė (Head of LRT's communication and marketing department), Justina Sokolovskė (LRT public relations and marketing project manager), Povilas Varvuolis (television director) and Vytautas Bikus (composer).

On 4 January 2021, the final changes to the list of 22 competing acts were made with the withdrawal of the song "Įkvėpk drąsos" written by Evelina Sašenko and Rūta Lukoševičiūtė-Daudienė and performed by Sašenko, and singer Gintarė Korsakaitė.

Artist	Song	Songwriter(s)
Aistė Brokenleg	"Home"	Linas Karolis Krasauskas, Aistė Motiejūnaitė
Aldegunda	"Sit Down"	Gailė Asačiovaitė-Main
Be U	"Love Yourself"	Ąžuolas Paulauskas
Black Spikes feat. Indrė Launikonytė	"Don't Tell Me"	Dovilė Virbalaitė, Rimantas Budriūnas, Agnieška Vrubliauskienė, Simona Karinauskaitė, Indrė Launikonytė
Cosmic Bride	"Solitary Star"	Natalia Chareckaja, Davide Fortugno
Donata Virbilaitė	"The Way I Am"	Ylva Persson, Linda Persson
Evita Cololo	"Be paslapčių"	Evita Cololo, Elizabeta Eliševa Povilaitė, Vitalijus Puzyriovas
Gabrielė Goštautaitė	"Freedom"	Gabrielė Goštautaitė, Tomas Kondrackis
Gabrielius Vagelis	"My Guy"	Gabrielius Vagelis, Bjørn Holmesland
Gebrasy	"Where'd You Wanna Go?"	Audrius Petrauskas, Faustas Venckus
Martyna Jezepčikaitė	"Thank You Very Much" (Note: Originally titled "F**k You Very Much". Due to Eurovision rules, the clean version was used.)	Andreas Stone Johansson, Julia Kautz, Morten Thorhauge, Selin Üstün
Milita Daikerytė	"Shadows"	Audrius Petrauskas, Faustas Venckus
Norbertas	"Man in Need"	Faustas Venckus, Dennis Steenbergen
Rapolas	"Degam"	Rapolas Kęstutis Meškauskas
The Roop	"Discoteque"	Vaidotas Valiukevičius, Robertas Baranauskas, Mantas Banišauskas, Laisvūnas Černovas, Kalle Lindroth, Ilkka Wirtanen
Sunday Afternoon	"Open"	Vilija Matačiūnaitė
Thomukas1	"Wish"	Thomas Tumosa, Simonas Kazlauskas, Pijus Brazys
Titas and Benas	"No"	Audrius Petrauskas, Faustas Venckus
Twosome	"I Love My Bear"	Justinas Stanislovaitis, Paulius Šinkūnas
UnoBand	"Eisiu"	Paulius Jasiūnas
Voldemars Petersons	"Never Fall for You Again"	Voldemars Petersons

==== Jury members ====
The jury panel consisted of five members in the heats and the semi-final, and seven members in the final.

Jury members by show
Jury member	Heats		Semi-final	Final	Occupation(s)
Jury member	1	2	Semi-final	Final	Occupation(s)
Aistė Smilgevičiūtė	Yes	No	Yes	Yes	singer
Gerūta Griniūtė	No	Yes	Yes	Yes	cultural programs and events presenter
Ieva Narkutė	Yes	Yes	No	Yes	singer-songwriter
Jievaras Jasinskis	Yes	No	Yes	Yes	composer, arranger, trombonist
Ramūnas Zilnys	Yes	Yes	Yes	Yes	LRT pop music editor-in-chief
Stanislavas Stavickis-Stano	No	Yes	Yes	Yes	singer, composer
Vytautas Bikus	Yes	Yes	No	Yes	composer

==== Shows ====
===== Heats =====
The two heats of the competition were filmed on 12 and 19 January 2021 and aired on 16 and 23 January 2021, featuring ten entries each. The top five entries from each heat advanced to the semi-final, while the bottom five were eliminated.

Heat 1 – 16 January 2021
R/O	Artist	Song	Jury		Televote		Total	Place
R/O	Artist	Song	Votes	Points	Votes	Points	Total	Place
1	Black Spikes feat. Indrė Launikonytė	"Don't Tell Me"	24	4	805	8	12	6
2	Thomukas1	"Wish"	8	2	108	1	3	10
3	Be U	"Love Yourself"	30	6	780	7	13	5
4	Titas and Benas	"No"	41	8	994	10	18	2
5	Martyna Jezepčikaitė	"Thank You Very Much"	27	5	2,063	12	17	3
6	Donata Virbilaitė	"The Way I Am"	36	7	353	3	10	7
7	Twosome	"I Love My Bear"	8	2	213	2	4	9
8	Milita Daikerytė	"Shadows"	49	10	448	5	15	4
9	Aldegunda	"Sit Down"	15	3	357	4	7	8
10	Voldemars Petersons	"Never Fall for You Again"	52	12	498	6	18	1

Heat 2 – 23 January 2021
R/O	Artist	Song	Jury		Televote		Total	Place
R/O	Artist	Song	Votes	Points	Votes	Points	Total	Place
1	UnoBand	"Eisiu"	7	1	169	3	4	10
2	Cosmic Bride	"Solitary Star"	26	6	93	1	7	9
3	Rapolas	"Degam"	19	3	333	5	8	7
4	Sunday Afternoon	"Open"	24	5	249	4	9	6
5	Aistė Brokenleg	"Home"	27	7	131	2	9	5
6	Norbertas	"Man In Need"	21	4	587	10	14	4
7	Gabrielė Goštautaitė	"Freedom"	18	2	340	6	8	8
8	Gebrasy	"Where'd You Wanna Go?"	55	12	868	12	24	1
9	Evita Cololo	"Be paslapčių"	46	8	443	8	16	3
10	Gabrielius Vagelis	"My Guy"	47	10	423	7	17	2

===== Semi-final =====
The semi-final of the competition was filmed on 26 January 2021 and aired on 30 January 2021, featuring the ten entries that qualified from the heats. The show was filmed on 26 January 2021. The top five entries advanced to the final, while the bottom five were eliminated.

Semi-final – 30 January 2021
R/O	Artist	Song	Jury		Televote		Total	Place
R/O	Artist	Song	Votes	Points	Votes	Points	Total	Place
1	Be U	"Love Yourself"	14	1	858	7	8	9
2	Aistė Brokenleg	"Home"	16	4	208	1	5	10
3	Gabrielius Vagelis	"My Guy"	24	6	688	4	10	7
4	Martyna Jezepčikaitė	"Thank You Very Much"	20	5	1,816	10	15	2
5	Norbertas	"Man In Need"	15	2	832	6	8	8
6	Evita Cololo	"Be paslapčių"	45	10	350	2	12	3
7	Titas and Benas	"No"	16	4	943	8	12	5
8	Voldemars Petersons	"Never Fall for You Again"	38	7	819	5	12	4
9	Milita Daikerytė	"Shadows"	42	8	592	3	11	6
10	Gebrasy	"Where'd You Wanna Go?"	60	12	2,237	12	24	1

===== Final =====
The final of the competition took place on 6 February 2021 and featured the remaining five entries that qualified from the semi-final, alongside automatic qualifier The Roop. The final was the only show in the competition to be broadcast live; all other preceding shows were pre-recorded earlier in the week before their airdates. "Discoteque", performed by the Roop was selected as the winner after gaining the most points from both the jury vote and the public vote.

Final – 6 February 2021
R/O	Artist	Song	Jury		Televote		Total	Place
R/O	Artist	Song	Votes	Points	Votes	Points	Total	Place
1	Titas and Benas	"No"	44	6	1,094	6	12	6
2	Martyna Jezepčikaitė	"Thank You Very Much"	40	5	2,453	8	13	4
3	Gebrasy	"Where'd You Wanna Go?"	70	10	6,413	10	20	2
4	Voldemars Petersons	"Never Fall for You Again"	51	8	1,224	7	15	3
5	Evita Cololo	"Be paslapčių"	47	7	427	5	12	5
6	The Roop	"Discoteque"	84	12	74,512	12	24	1

==== Ratings ====
Viewing figures by show
Show	Date	Viewing figures	
Show	Date	Nominal	Share
Heat 1	16 January 2021	255,600	23.3%
Heat 2	23 January 2021	258,200	24.5%
Semi-final	30 January 2021	234,100	22.3%
Final	6 February 2021	324,500	29%

== At Eurovision ==
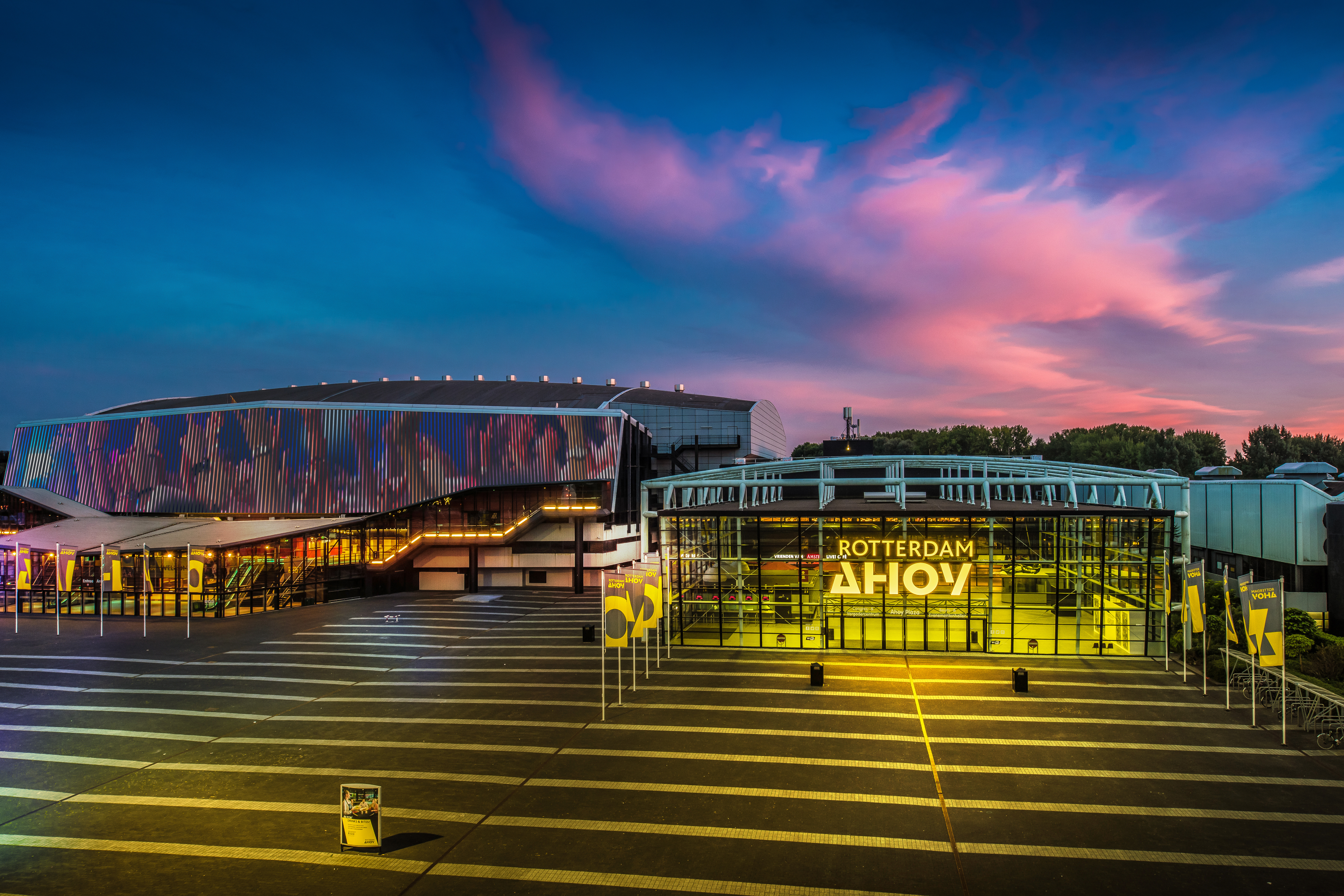
The Eurovision Song Contest 2021 took place at the Rotterdam Ahoy in Rotterdam, Netherlands

According to Eurovision rules, all nations with the exceptions of the host country and the "Big Five" (France, Germany, Italy, Spain and the United Kingdom) are required to qualify from one of two semi-finals in order to compete for the final; the top ten countries from each semi-final progress to the final. The European Broadcasting Union (EBU) split up the competing countries into six different pots based on voting patterns from previous contests, with countries with favourable voting histories put into the same pot. The semi-final allocation draw held for the Eurovision Song Contest 2020 on 28 January 2020 was used for the 2021 contest, which Lithuania was placed into the first semi-final, which was held on 18 May 2021, and was scheduled to perform in the first half of the show.

Once all the competing songs for the 2021 contest had been released, the running order for the semi-finals was decided by the shows' producers rather than through another draw, so that similar songs were not placed next to each other. Lithuania was set to open the show and perform in position 1, before the entry from Slovenia.

The two semi-finals and final were broadcast in Lithuania on LRT and LRT Radijas with commentary by Ramūnas Zilnys. The Lithuanian spokesperson who announced the top 12-point score awarded by the Lithuanian jury during the final was Andrius Mamontovas, who previously represented Lithuania in 2006 as part of LT United.

=== Semi-final ===
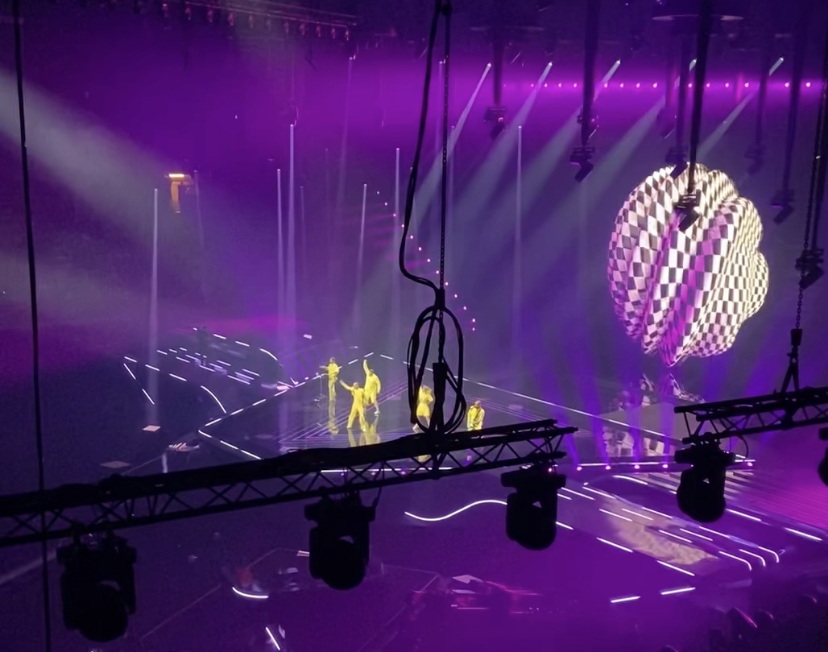
The Roop during a rehearsal before the first semi-final

The Roop took part in technical rehearsals on 8 and 12 May, followed by dress rehearsals on 17 and 18 May. This included the jury show on 17 May, where the professional juries of each country watched and voted on the competing entries.

The Lithuanian performance featured the members of the Roop in yellow costumes and performing on stage with pink and black stage colours, and the LED screens displaying shapes, geometric images, and a lightning effect. The band was joined on stage by two dancers who together performed choreography throughout the song. The performance also featured the lighting on the performers blacking out prior to the first pre-chorus to create a silhouette effect. The stage director for the Lithuanian performance was Povilas Varvuolis. The two dancers that joined the Roop on stage were Marijanas Staniulėnas and Miglė Praniauskaitė, while an off-stage backing vocalist was also featured: Algirdas Daumantas Ciūnys.

At the end of the show, Lithuania was announced as having finished in the top 10 and subsequently qualifying for the final. It was later revealed that Lithuania placed fourth in the semi-final, receiving a total of 203 points: 137 points from the televoting and 66 points from the juries.

=== Final ===
Shortly after the first semi-final, a winners' press conference was held for the ten qualifying countries. As part of this press conference, the qualifying artists took part in a draw to determine which half of the final they would subsequently participate in. This draw was done in the order the countries were announced during the semi-final. Lithuania was drawn to compete in the second half. Following this draw, the shows' producers decided upon the running order of the final, as they had done for the semi-finals. Lithuania was subsequently placed to perform in position 18, following the entry from Bulgaria and before the entry from Ukraine.

The Roop once again took part in dress rehearsals on 21 and 22 May before the final, including the jury final, where the professional juries cast their final votes before the live show. The band performed a repeat of their semi-final performance during the final on 22 May. Lithuania placed eighth in the final, scoring 220 points: 165 points from the televoting and 55 points from the juries.

=== Voting ===
Voting during the three shows involved each country awarding two sets of points from 1-8, 10 and 12: one from their professional jury and the other from televoting. Each nation's jury consisted of five music industry professionals who are citizens of the country they represent, with a diversity in gender and age represented. The judges assess each entry based on the performances during the second Dress Rehearsal of each show, which takes place the night before each live show, against a set of criteria including: vocal capacity; the stage performance; the song's composition and originality; and the overall impression by the act. Jury members may only take part in panel once every three years, and are obliged to confirm that they are not connected to any of the participating acts in a way that would impact their ability to vote impartially. Jury members should also vote independently, with no discussion of their vote permitted with other jury members. The exact composition of the professional jury, and the results of each country's jury and televoting were released after the final; the individual results from each jury member were also released in an anonymised form.

Below is a breakdown of points awarded to Lithuania and awarded by Lithuania in the first semi-final and final of the contest, and the breakdown of the jury voting and televoting conducted during the two shows:

==== Points awarded to Lithuania ====
Points awarded to Lithuania (Semi-final 1)
Score	Televote	Jury
12 points	Cyprus; Germany; Ireland; Norway; Ukraine	Israel
10 points	Sweden	
8 points	Australia; Belgium; Italy; Netherlands	Romania
7 points	Malta; Russia	Italy; Sweden
6 points	Romania	Croatia
5 points	Israel	Ireland
4 points	North Macedonia	Germany; Malta
3 points	Azerbaijan; Croatia	Cyprus; Netherlands
2 points		Australia; Belgium; Russia
1 point		Ukraine

Points awarded to Lithuania (Final)
Score	Televote	Jury
12 points	Germany; Ireland; Latvia; Norway; United Kingdom	Italy
10 points	Estonia; Georgia; Ukraine	Israel
8 points		
7 points	Belgium; Sweden	
6 points	Australia; Malta	Latvia; San Marino
5 points	Cyprus; Finland; Italy	
4 points	Denmark; Iceland; Poland; Spain	Ireland; Switzerland
3 points	Austria; Israel; Netherlands; Romania	Finland; Georgia
2 points	Moldova; Russia	Croatia; Estonia; Spain
1 point	Czech Republic; Switzerland	Germany

==== Points awarded by Lithuania ====
Points awarded by Lithuania (Semi-final 1)
Score	Televote	Jury
12 points	Ukraine	Ukraine
10 points	Belgium	Belgium
8 points	Russia	Australia
7 points	Malta	Israel
6 points	Norway	Malta
5 points	Sweden	Romania
4 points	Cyprus	Cyprus
3 points	Azerbaijan	Sweden
2 points	Israel	Norway
1 point	Ireland	Croatia

Points awarded by Lithuania (Final)
Score	Televote	Jury
12 points	Ukraine	Ukraine
10 points	Italy	Italy
8 points	France	Switzerland
7 points	Finland	Belgium
6 points	Switzerland	Portugal
5 points	Norway	France
4 points	Russia	Iceland
3 points	Iceland	Malta
2 points	Belgium	Bulgaria
1 point	Sweden	Israel

==== Detailed voting results ====
The following members comprised the Lithuanian jury:

- Jievaras Jasinskis
- Rafailas Karpis
- Giedrė Kilčiauskienė
- Raminta Naujanytė-Bjelle
- Darius Užkuraitis

Detailed voting results from Lithuania (Semi-final 1)
R/O	Country	Jury							Televote	
R/O	Country	Juror A	Juror B	Juror C	Juror D	Juror E	Rank	Points	Rank	Points
01	Lithuania									
02	Slovenia	15	9	13	11	15	15		14	
03	Russia	10	15	14	9	9	11		3	8
04	Sweden	11	2	9	8	8	8	3	6	5
05	Australia	9	1	4	3	7	3	8	11	
06	North Macedonia	14	13	8	15	10	13		15	
07	Ireland	13	14	7	12	12	12		10	1
08	Cyprus	6	3	15	6	6	7	4	7	4
09	Norway	4	12	12	14	3	9	2	5	6
10	Croatia	3	11	11	7	13	10	1	12	
11	Belgium	7	4	2	2	2	2	10	2	10
12	Israel	2	5	3	10	5	4	7	9	2
13	Romania	5	8	5	4	11	6	5	13	
14	Azerbaijan	12	10	10	13	14	14		8	3
15	Ukraine	1	6	1	1	4	1	12	1	12
16	Malta	8	7	6	5	1	5	6	4	7

Detailed voting results from Lithuania (Final)
R/O	Country	Jury							Televote	
R/O	Country	Juror A	Juror B	Juror C	Juror D	Juror E	Rank	Points	Rank	Points
01	Cyprus	13	15	21	15	17	18		11	
02	Albania	23	22	24	19	24	23		25	
03	Israel	11	16	7	20	7	10	1	16	
04	Belgium	6	4	3	3	1	4	7	9	2
05	Russia	16	21	16	24	19	19		7	4
06	Malta	15	8	9	8	5	8	3	15	
07	Portugal	4	1	5	4	12	5	6	12	
08	Serbia	24	23	25	23	21	24		21	
09	United Kingdom	20	17	18	18	25	20		20	
10	Greece	8	14	19	13	16	15		17	
11	Switzerland	5	6	2	2	2	3	8	5	6
12	Iceland	10	7	11	5	9	7	4	8	3
13	Spain	22	19	12	16	13	17		24	
14	Moldova	25	25	23	25	23	25		22	
15	Germany	14	12	14	10	8	12		13	
16	Finland	12	10	10	12	10	11		4	7
17	Bulgaria	7	13	8	11	15	9	2	18	
18	Lithuania									
19	Ukraine	3	3	1	1	3	1	12	1	12
20	France	2	5	6	7	14	6	5	3	8
21	Azerbaijan	21	18	20	22	22	21		14	
22	Norway	9	20	17	17	6	13		6	5
23	Netherlands	19	11	15	9	11	14		23	
24	Italy	1	2	4	6	4	2	10	2	10
25	Sweden	17	9	13	14	18	16		10	1
26	San Marino	18	24	22	21	20	22		19	
