= Cyprus in the Eurovision Song Contest 2021 =

- Eurovision Song Contest 2021
- Participating broadcaster: Cyprus Broadcasting Corporation (CyBC)
- Country: Cyprus
- Selection process: Internal selection
- Announcement date: 25 November 2020

Competing entry
- Song: "El Diablo"
- Artist: Elena Tsagrinou
- Songwriters: Jimmy "Joker" Thörnfeldt; Laurell Barker; Cleiton "Oxa" Sia; Thomas Stengaard

Placement
- Semi-final result: Qualified (6th, 170 points)
- Final result: 16th, 94 points

Participation chronology

Cyprus was represented at the Eurovision Song Contest 2021 with the song "El Diablo", written by Thomas Stengaard, Laurell Barker, Cleiton "Oxa" Sia, and Jimmy Thörnfeldt, and performed by Elena Tsagrinou. The Cypriot participating broadcaster, Cyprus Broadcasting Corporation (CyBC), internally selected its entry for the contest.

Cyprus performed 8th in the first semi-final of the Eurovision Song Contest 2021, held on 18 May 2021, and placed 6th, receiving 170 points. The entry qualified for the final held four days later, where the nation placed 16th with 94 points.

== Background ==
Prior to the 2021 contest, the Cyprus Broadcasting Corporation (CyBC) had participated in the Eurovision Song Contest representing Cyprus thirty-six times since its debut in 1981. Its best placing was at the 2018 contest where "Fuego" by Eleni Foureira placed second. Before that, its best result was fifth, which it achieved three times: in 1982 with the song "Mono i agapi" performed by Anna Vissi, in 1997 with "Mana mou" performed by Hara and Andreas Constantinou, and in 2004 with "Stronger Every Minute" performed by Lisa Andreas. Its least successful result was in 1986 when it placed last with the song "Tora zo" by Elpida, receiving only four points in total. However, its worst finish in terms of points received was when it placed second to last in 1999 with "Tha 'nai erotas" by Marlain Angelidou, receiving only two points. After returning to the contest in 2015 following their one-year absence due to the 2012–13 Cypriot financial crisis and the broadcaster's budget restrictions, it had qualified for the final of all the contests in which it has participated.

As part of its duties as participating broadcaster, CyBC organises the selection of its entry in the Eurovision Song Contest and broadcasts the event in the country. The broadcaster has used various methods to select its entry in the past, such as internal selections and televised national finals to choose the performer, song or both to compete at Eurovision. In 2015, CyBC organised the national final Eurovision Song Project, which featured 54 songs competing in a nine-week-long process resulting in the selection of entry through the combination of public televoting and the votes from an expert jury. Since 2016, however, it has opted to select the entry internally without input from the public.

== Before Eurovision ==
=== Internal selection ===
On 25 November 2020, CyBC announced that they had internally selected Greek singer Elena Tsagrinou to represent Cyprus in the Eurovision Song Contest 2021 with the song "El Diablo". Tsagrinou previously participated in the second season of Ellada Eheis Talento where she progressed to the semi-final. Signed to Panik Records, she was a former member of the group Otherview. "El Diablo" was written by Jimmy "Joker" Thörnfeldt, Laurell Barker, Oxa, and Thomas Stengaard. Barker and Stengaard have written several Eurovision entries for various countries with the latter having written "Only Teardrops", the Eurovision winning entry for Denmark in 2013. On 25 January 2021, Tsagrinou announced on her Instagram account that the song would be released exactly one month later, on 24 February 2021.

A preview of "El Diablo" was presented to the public on 24 February 2021 during the RIK 1 programme Happy Hour, hosted by Andreas Giortsios. The official preview video for the song, directed by George Benioudakis was also available on the Panik Records mobile app and website. The music video was hosted on the website until 27 February; on 28 February, the song and full length music video was officially released to the public.

=== Reception ===
Upon release, the song was controversial within Cyprus, with the Church of Cyprus calling for the withdrawal of song. The church stated that the song made an international mockery of country's moral foundations by advocating "our surrender to the devil and promoting his worship". They felt that the song was offensive, disrespectful and unrepresentative, and demanded that the state broadcaster CyBC withdraw Cyprus' Eurovision entry. In February 2021, Orthodox Christians in Cyprus launched an online petition to ask the withdrawal from the Eurovision Song Contest. This was followed by a protest held in March outside of CyBC to demand the song's withdrawal, and a petition signed by just over 20,000 people on Avaaz to urge for the cancellation of the country's Eurovision participation. The government publicly rejected the reactions from religious and conservative groups, claiming it respects both spiritual rights but also the freedom of artistic expression.

== At Eurovision ==
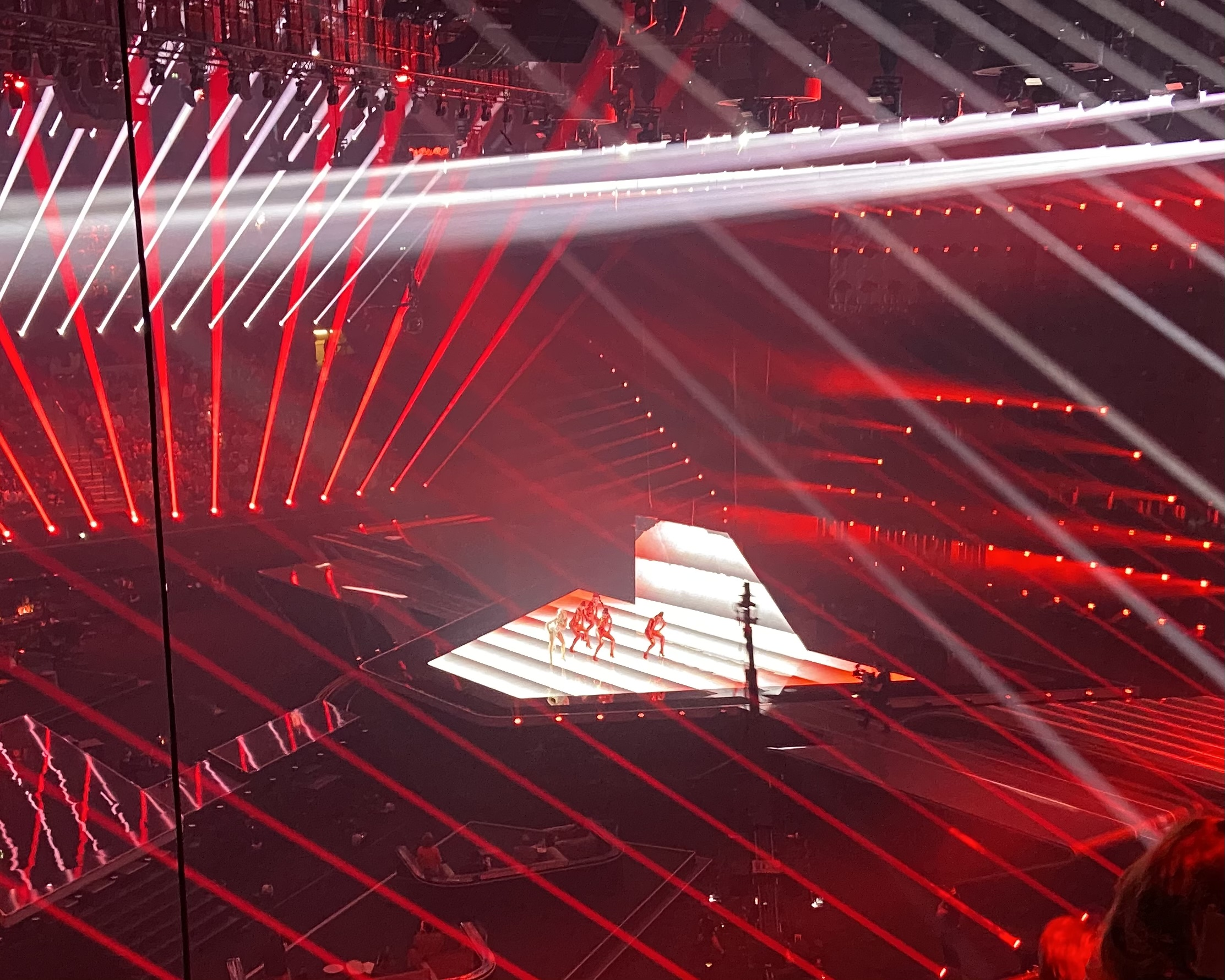
Elena Tsagrinou performing "El diablo" in the jury show for the first semi-final.

The Eurovision Song Contest 2021 took place at Rotterdam Ahoy in Rotterdam, the Netherlands, and consisted of two semi-finals held on the respective dates of 18 and 20 May, and the final on 22 May 2021. According to Eurovision rules, all nations with the exceptions of the host country and the "Big Five" (France, Germany, Italy, Spain and the United Kingdom) are required to qualify from one of two semi-finals in order to compete for the final; the top ten countries from each semi-final progress to the final. The European Broadcasting Union (EBU) split up the competing countries into six different pots based on voting patterns from previous contests as determined by the contest's televoting partner Digame. The semi-final allocation draw held for the Eurovision Song Contest 2020 on 28 January 2020 was used for the 2021 contest; Cyprus was placed into the first semi-final, to be held on 18 May 2021, and was scheduled to perform in the second half of the show. Once all the competing songs for the 2021 contest had been released, the running order for the semi-finals was decided by the shows' producers rather than through another draw, so that similar songs were not placed next to each other. Cyprus was set to perform in position 8, following the entry from Ireland and preceding the entry from Norway. Louis Patsalides served as the commentator for the broadcasts of the contest within Cyprus.

=== Performances ===
Marvin Dietmann was the artistic director for the entry, responsible for the country's stage performance. Technical rehearsals for the performance took place the week prior to the contest, on 9 and 12 May 2021.

The first semi-final was held on 18 May and Cyprus was announced as one of the ten countries to have qualified for the final. It was later revealed that the entry placed sixth in the semi-final, receiving a total of 170 points. Soon after, the EBU posted the running order for the final, placing Cyprus in the first position, preceding Albania. At the close of voting for the final, held on 22 May, "El Diablo" placed 16th in the field of 26, receiving 94 points.

=== Voting ===
Voting during the three shows involved each country awarding two sets of points from 1-8, 10 and 12: one from their professional jury and the other from televoting. The judges assessed each entry based on the performances during the second Dress Rehearsal of each show, which took place the night before each live show, against a set of criteria including: vocal capacity; the stage performance; the song's composition and originality; and the overall impression by the act. The exact composition of the professional jury, and the results of each country's jury and televoting were released after the final; the individual results from each jury member were also released in an anonymised form. Cyprus's jury consisted of Andreas, Marilena Charalambidou, Christiana Mitella, Alexandros Taramountas and Tasos Tryfonos.

Below is a breakdown of points awarded to Cyprus in the first semi-final, as well as by the country in the final. In the first semi-final, Cyprus placed 6th with a total of 170 points, thus qualifying for the final. The performance received 78 televoting points, which included the maximum 12 awarded by Malta. The jury points added to 92, including 12 from Slovenia. In the final, Cyprus placed 16th with 94 points, with two sets of 12 points from Greece (jury and televote) and one set from Russia's televote. Over the course of the contest, Cyprus awarded its 12 points in the first semi-final to Lithuania (televote) and Malta (jury), while in the final, both sets were awarded to Greece. CyBC appointed Loukas Hamatsos as its spokesperson to announce the Cypriot jury vote in the final.

==== Points awarded to Cyprus ====
Points awarded to Cyprus (Semi-final 1)
Score	Televote	Jury
12 points	Malta	Slovenia
10 points		Australia; Croatia; Israel
8 points		Malta; Russia
7 points		
6 points	Australia; Croatia; Ireland; Israel; North Macedonia	
5 points	Russia	Germany; Norway
4 points	Azerbaijan; Lithuania; Romania; Sweden; Ukraine	Ireland; Lithuania; North Macedonia; Sweden
3 points	Belgium; Norway	Italy; Romania
2 points	Italy	Ukraine
1 point	Germany; Netherlands; Slovenia	

Points awarded to Cyprus (Final)
Score	Televote	Jury
12 points	Greece; Russia	Greece
10 points		
8 points	San Marino	
7 points		Albania; Germany
6 points	North Macedonia	Spain
5 points		
4 points		Australia; Malta
3 points		Israel
2 points	Albania; Malta; Serbia	France; North Macedonia; Russia
1 point		Moldova

==== Points awarded by Cyprus ====
Points awarded by Cyprus (Semi-final 1)
Score	Televote	Jury
12 points	Lithuania	Malta
10 points	Israel	Romania
8 points	Malta	Russia
7 points	Russia	Sweden
6 points	Ukraine	Slovenia
5 points	Romania	Croatia
4 points	Azerbaijan	Belgium
3 points	Sweden	Lithuania
2 points	Croatia	Ireland
1 point	Norway	Israel

Points awarded by Cyprus (Final)
Score	Televote	Jury
12 points	Greece	Greece
10 points	Italy	Malta
8 points	France	Italy
7 points	Bulgaria	France
6 points	Ukraine	Russia
5 points	Lithuania	Bulgaria
4 points	Finland	Belgium
3 points	Russia	Finland
2 points	Israel	Switzerland
1 point	Malta	Portugal

==== Detailed voting results ====
The following members comprised the Cypriot jury:

- Andreas
- Marilena Charalambidou
- Christiana Mitella
- Alexandros Taramountas
- Tasos Tryfonos

Detailed voting results from Cyprus (Semi-final 1)
R/O	Country	Jury							Televote	
R/O	Country	Juror A	Juror B	Juror C	Juror D	Juror E	Rank	Points	Rank	Points
01	Lithuania	4	12	12	6	12	8	3	1	12
02	Slovenia	7	6	6	8	4	5	6	13	
03	Russia	2	5	4	5	5	3	8	4	7
04	Sweden	5	13	2	10	2	4	7	8	3
05	Australia	14	14	10	13	8	14		14	
06	North Macedonia	13	15	11	15	14	15		15	
07	Ireland	3	9	15	14	9	9	2	12	
08	Cyprus									
09	Norway	15	11	9	4	10	12		10	1
10	Croatia	8	4	7	9	6	6	5	9	2
11	Belgium	10	1	13	7	15	7	4	11	
12	Israel	9	8	5	12	11	10	1	2	10
13	Romania	6	3	1	1	3	2	10	6	5
14	Azerbaijan	12	7	8	11	7	13		7	4
15	Ukraine	11	10	14	3	13	11		5	6
16	Malta	1	2	3	2	1	1	12	3	8

Detailed voting results from Cyprus (Final)
R/O	Country	Jury							Televote	
R/O	Country	Juror A	Juror B	Juror C	Juror D	Juror E	Rank	Points	Rank	Points
01	Cyprus									
02	Albania	19	20	17	17	17	20		21	
03	Israel	9	12	13	16	11	17		9	2
04	Belgium	11	1	14	15	18	7	4	20	
05	Russia	5	5	6	7	6	5	6	8	3
06	Malta	2	3	4	3	3	2	10	10	1
07	Portugal	7	13	3	19	24	10	1	17	
08	Serbia	25	21	23	21	13	22		12	
09	United Kingdom	20	19	20	24	21	23		24	
10	Greece	1	2	1	1	1	1	12	1	12
11	Switzerland	15	14	2	12	15	9	2	11	
12	Iceland	10	6	18	11	19	15		15	
13	Spain	21	24	12	23	20	21		22	
14	Moldova	12	11	10	10	14	16		25	
15	Germany	24	25	21	25	22	25		18	
16	Finland	22	9	24	8	2	8	3	7	4
17	Bulgaria	14	8	9	2	23	6	5	4	7
18	Lithuania	6	16	15	20	7	13		6	5
19	Ukraine	18	22	25	4	10	14		5	6
20	France	3	7	8	6	5	4	7	3	8
21	Azerbaijan	17	17	19	14	16	19		14	
22	Norway	16	18	16	18	8	18		16	
23	Netherlands	23	23	22	22	25	24		23	
24	Italy	4	4	5	5	4	3	8	2	10
25	Sweden	8	15	7	13	12	11		13	
26	San Marino	13	10	11	9	9	12		19	
