= Alcohol You =

2020 song by Roxen

Single by Roxen
- Released: 21 February 2020
- Length: 2:55
- Label: Global
- Songwriters: Ionuț Armaș; Viky Red; Breyan Isaac
- Producer: Viky Red

Roxen singles chronology
"You Don't Love Me" (2019)	"Alcohol You" (2020)	"Spune-mi" (2020)

Eurovision Song Contest 2020 entry
- Country: Romania
- Artist: Roxen
- Language: English
- Composers: Ionuț Armaș; Viky Red
- Lyricists: Ionuț Armaș; Breyan Isaac

Finals performance
- Semi-final result: Contest cancelled

Entry chronology
- ◄ "On a Sunday" (2019)
- "Amnesia" (2021) ►

"Alcohol You" is a song recorded by Romanian singer Roxen, digitally released on 21 February 2020 by Global Records. It was written by Ionuț Armaș and Breyan Isaac, while Viky Red solely handed its production. "Alcohol You" emerged as the winner of Selecția Națională 2020 and was thus scheduled to represent Romania at the Eurovision Song Contest 2020 before the event's cancellation due to the COVID-19 pandemic in China and its spread to other countries. Roxen had previously been internally selected at the country's representative by Romanian Television (TVR).

Musically, the track is a ballad that discusses emotions such as sadness, despair, hope and nostalgia, as well as finding inner peace. It has a minimalistic and Billie Eilish-inspired production. "Alcohol You" was generally well received by music critics upon release, receiving praise for its lyrics and Roxen's vocal delivery. To promote the song, a lyric video was uploaded to YouTube simultaneously with the track's digital availability. Directed by Bogdan Păun, Roxen is shown in front of a neon sketch of herself alongside light and smoke effects. Additionally, the singer performed "Alcohol You" on the native talk show La Măruță and radio station Virgin in February and March 2020, respectively.

== Background and composition ==
The lyrics of "Alcohol You" were written by Breyan Isaac and Ionuț Armaș. The latter composed the song alongside its sole producer Viky Red. Global Records made it available for digital download in various countries on 21 February 2020. Lyrically, the "dramatic" ballad discusses emotions such as sadness, despair, hope, nostalgia and finding inner peace. Romanian Television (TVR) labelled it as a "genuine anthem of universal love". Music critics noted a minimalistic production, with one comparing it to the works of American singer Billie Eilish. For the purpose of Roxen's scheduled Eurovision Song Contest 2020 participation, the closing chorus of "Alcohol You" was remastered, with "extended notes [...], new strings dial[ing] up the urgency and percussion" being added. Throughout the song, its title is used as a word play for "I'll call you". Regarding Roxen's vocal delivery, an ESCUnited staff member noted that "[t]hey does that grating indie voice where monosyllabic words are contorted ('mind' is my-eye-und, 'line' is lye-eye-ine, etc)".

== Critical reception ==
Upon its release, the track received generally positive reviews from music critics. Michael Outerson of EuroVisionary praised the original title of "Alcohol You". In a review for the song conducted by four ESCUnited staff members, the song's emotional nature and lyrics, as well as Roxen's vocal delivery were praised. The critics argued, however, on the word play and criticized the song's lack of a "proper hook". Robyn Gallagher of Wiwibloggs ironically called the track's title a dad joke, but expressed praise towards the "dark and gloomy" lyrics. In an eventual Wiwibloggs review containing several reviews from individual critics, the song was given a score of 7.43 out of 10 points. Romanian musician Horia Moculescu negatively noted that "Alcohol You" resembled the alcoholic lyrical themes of Romanian singer Delia's "Da, mamă" (2015).

== Music videos and promotion ==
A lyric video for "Alcohol You" was directed by Bogdan Păun and uploaded to YouTube on 21 February 2020. Alexandru Mureșan acted as the director of photography, while Mihai Sighinaș provided the graphics and Loops Production the production. The video begins with a spiralling shot of Roxen against a neon sketch of themself. As it continues, the song's lyrics swirl around them in addition to light and smoke effects being used; Wiwibloggs critic Angus Quinn wrote it "give[s] the video an almost underwater feel". The video ends with pulsing lights and the singer "hypnotic[ally]" reaching out to the camera. Additionally, the team also created a video for an "alternative" version of the track (Crystal Freckles Session), which was released on 25 February. For promotional purposes, Roxen performed the track on La Măruță in late February, as well as on Virgin Radio on 3 March. While in quarantine during the COVID-19 pandemic, footage of Roxen performing "Alcohol You" in a bedroom was broadcast during the Spanish PreParty ES event on 12 April, as well as during European Broadcasting Union's (EBU) Eurovision Home Concerts series on 1 April.

== At Eurovision ==
=== National selection ===
In January 2020, TVR announced its collaboration with Global Records to select the Romanian entry for the Eurovision Song Contest 2020 in Rotterdam, Netherlands. On 11 February, Roxen was announced as the country's representative, and five songs were appointed—"Alcohol You", "Beautiful Disaster", "Cherry Red", "Colors" and "Storm"—that had been written during a songwriting camp previously organized. The entries advanced to the national final Selecția Națională 2020 for a jury panel and the public to choose from as the Romanian Eurovision entry. "Alcohol You" emerged as the winner, gathering a total of ten points consisting of the maximum five points from both the jury and the televote. Its live performance was directed by Păun with the assistance of the director of photography Dan Manoliu, and made use of a circular stage and a LED screen sized around 300 square metres. Florian Rahn of Wiwibloggs described the performance as "heartfelt and emotional", noting a "dark and mysterious" staging. Roxen wore a white dress with a black lace top and, at a point, interacted with a mirror image of herself on the LED screen.

=== In Rotterdam ===
The Eurovision Song Contest 2020 was scheduled to take place at Rotterdam Ahoy in Rotterdam, Netherlands and consist of two semi-finals on 12 and 14 May, and the final on 16 May 2020. According to Eurovision rules, each country, except the host country and the "Big Five" (France, Germany, Italy, Spain and the United Kingdom), would have been required to qualify from one of two semi-finals to compete for the final; the top ten countries from each semi-final would have progressed to the final. In January 2020, it was announced that Romania would be performing in the second half of the first semi-final of the contest. However, on 18 March, EBU announced the event's cancellation due to the pandemic of the COVID-19 in China and its spread to other countries. Although TVR had considered sending "Alcohol You" to participate in the Eurovision Song Contest 2021, EBU soon after announced that intended 2020 entries were not eligible for the following year. Nonetheless, Roxen was internally selected for 2021.

==== Alternative song contests ====
Some of the broadcasters scheduled to take part in the Eurovision Song Contest 2020 have organised alternative competitions. Austria's ORF aired Der kleine Song Contest in April 2020, which saw every entry being assigned to one of three semi-finals. A jury consisting of ten singers that had represented Austria at Eurovision before was hired to rank each song; the best-placed in each semi-final advanced to the final round. In the first semi-final on 14 April, "Alcohol You" placed seventh in a field of 14 participants, achieving 61 points. The song also unsuccessfully took part in Norddeutscher Rundfunk's Eurovision 2020 – das deutsche Finale and Sveriges Television's Sveriges 12:a on 9 May.

== Track listing ==
- Official versions (Note: This acts as a summary of all versions of the single released for digital download.)
1. "Alcohol You" – 2:55
2. "Alcohol You" (Soundland Remix) – 3:08

== Release history ==
Country	Date	Format(s)	Label	Ref.
Various	21 February 2020	Digital download; streaming	Global	
