= Malta in the Eurovision Song Contest 2021 =

- Eurovision Song Contest 2021
- Participating broadcaster: Public Broadcasting Services (PBS)
- Country: Malta
- Selection process: Internal selection
- Announcement date: Artist: 18 May 2020; Song: 15 March 2021

Competing entry
- Song: "Je me casse"
- Artist: Destiny
- Songwriters: Malin Christin; Amanuel Dermont; Nicklas Eklund; Pete Barringer

Placement
- Semi-final result: Qualified (1st, 325 points)
- Final result: 7th, 255 points

Participation chronology

Malta was represented at the Eurovision Song Contest 2021 with the song "Je me casse", written by Malin Christin, Amanuel Dermont, Nicklas Eklund, and Pete Barringer, and performed by Destiny Chukunyere. The Maltese participating broadcaster, Public Broadcasting Services (PBS), internally selected its entry for the contest. Chukunyere was due to compete in the 2020 contest with "All of My Love" before the event's cancellation. PBS announced her as its representative on 18 May 2020. The song she would perform at the contest, "Je me casse", was released to the public on 15 March 2021.

Malta was drawn to compete in the first semi-final of the Eurovision Song Contest which took place on 18 May 2021. Performing as the closing entry during the show in position 16, "Je me casse" was announced among the top 10 entries of the first semi-final and therefore qualified to compete in the final on 22 May. It was later revealed that Malta placed first out of the 16 participating countries in the semi-final with 325 points. In the final, Malta performed in position 6 and placed seventh out of the 26 participating countries, scoring 255 points.

== Background ==
Prior to the 2021 contest, the Maltese Broadcasting Authority (MBA) until 1975, and the Public Broadcasting Services (PBS) since 1991, have participated in the Eurovision Song Contest representing Malta thirty-two times since MBA's first entry in 1971. MBA briefly competed in the contest in the 1970s before withdrawing for sixteen years, while PBS competed in every contest since their return in 1991. Their best placing in the contest thus far was second, achieved on two occasions: in 2002 with the song "7th Wonder" performed by Ira Losco and in the 2005 contest with the song "Angel" performed by Chiara. In the 2019 edition, "Chameleon" performed by Michela Pace qualified to the final and placed 14th.

As part of its duties as participating broadcaster, PBS organises the selection of its entry in the Eurovision Song Contest and broadcasts the event in the country. The broadcaster confirmed its intentions to participate at the 2021 contest on 18 May 2020. For its 2019 and 2020 participations, PBS utilised the talent show format X Factor Malta which resulted in the selection of a winning performer that would subsequently be given an internally selected song to perform at Eurovision.

== Before Eurovision ==
=== Internal selection ===
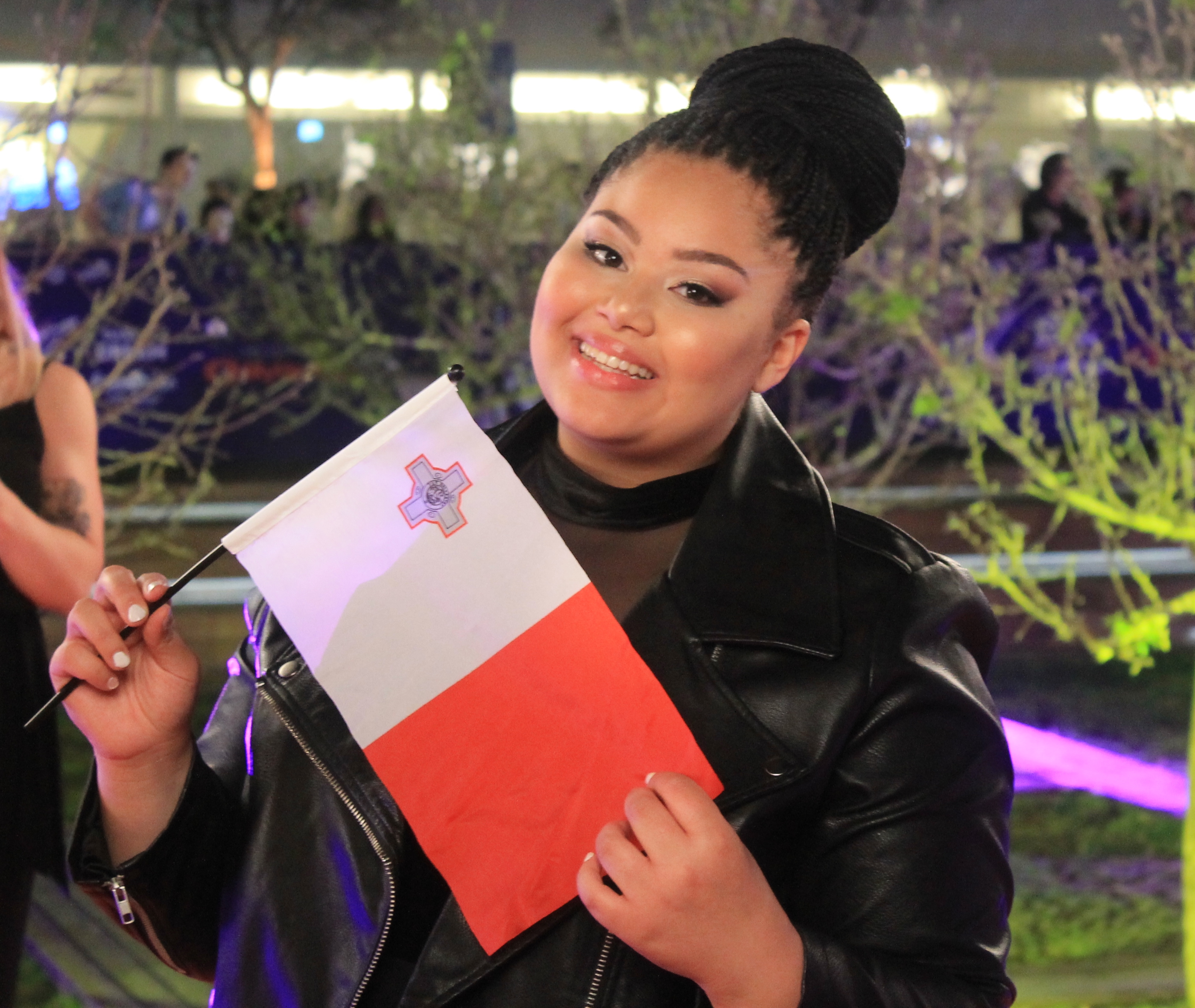
Destiny was internally selected to represent Malta in the Eurovision Song Contest 2020

On 18 May 2020, PBS confirmed that Destiny Chukunyere would remain as its representative for the Eurovision Song Contest 2021. On 26 October 2020, PBS announced a public call for composers and songwriters to express their interest in submitting a song for the singer until 30 October 2020. Those interested would be sent further details and guidelines, including the expected style, of the song.

On 15 March 2021, PBS announced that Destiny would perform the song "Je me casse" at the Eurovision Song Contest 2021. "Je me casse" was written by Malin Christin, Amanuel Dermont, Nicklas Eklund and Pete Barringer. A&Rs of the song were Kevin Lee and Greig Watts with publishing by WiiBii Music, DWB Music and StarLab Publishing. The release of the song and official music video was made available online on the broadcaster's website tvm.com.mt and the official Eurovision Song Contest's YouTube channel.

== At Eurovision ==
The Eurovision Song Contest 2021 took place at Rotterdam Ahoy in Rotterdam, the Netherlands, and consisted of two semi-finals held on the respective dates of 18 and 20 May, and the final on 22 May 2021. According to Eurovision rules, all nations with the exceptions of the host country and the "Big Five" (France, Germany, Italy, Spain and the United Kingdom) are required to qualify from one of two semi-finals in order to compete for the final; the top ten countries from each semi-final progress to the final. The European Broadcasting Union (EBU) split up the competing countries into six different pots based on voting patterns from previous contests, with countries with favourable voting histories put into the same pot. The semi-final allocation draw held for the Eurovision Song Contest 2020 on 28 January 2020 was used for the 2021 contest, which Malta was placed into the first semi-final, to be held on 18 May 2021, and was scheduled to perform in the second half of the show.

Once all the competing songs for the 2021 contest had been released, the running order for the semi-finals was decided by the shows' producers rather than through another draw, so that similar songs were not placed next to each other. Malta was set to perform last in position 16, following the entry from Ukraine.

The two semi-finals and the final were broadcast in Malta on TVM. The Maltese spokesperson, who announced the top 12 points awarded by the Maltese jury during the final, was Stephanie Spiteri.

=== Semi-final ===
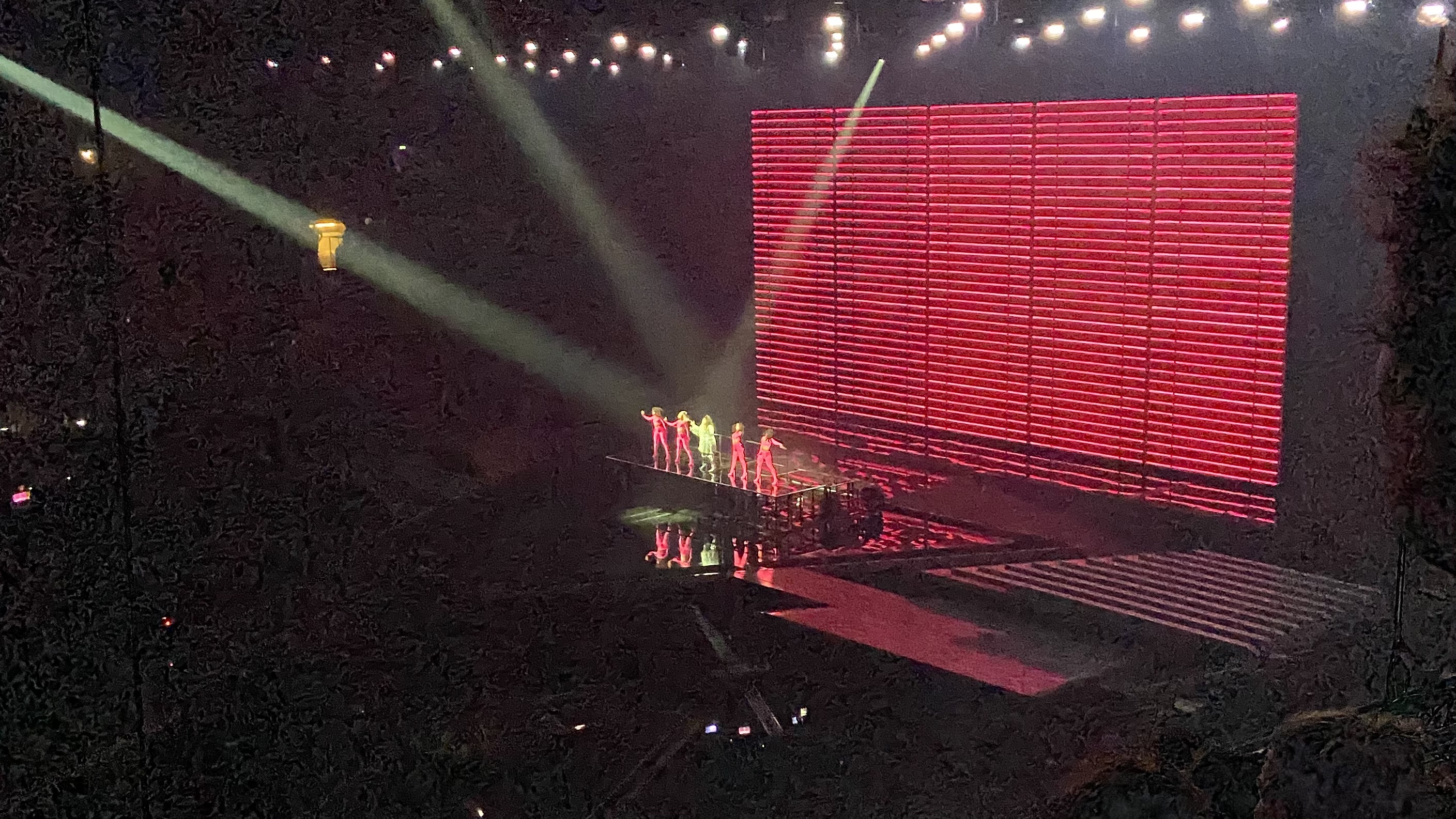
Destiny during a rehearsal before the first semi-final

Destiny took part in technical rehearsals on 9 and 13 May, followed by dress rehearsals on 17 and 18 May. This included the jury show on 17 May where the professional juries of each country watched and voted on the competing entries. On the day of the first semi-final, Malta was considered by bookmakers to be the most likely country to advance into the final.

The Maltese performance featured Destiny wearing a silver dress with huge draping sleeves and pink boots and performing together with four dancers. Destiny originally wore a pink outfit during the first technical rehearsal, but was replaced with the silver dress starting from the second technical rehearsal due to public criticism. The performance began with the background LED screens projecting a silhouette of Destiny in front of a small pink square followed by Destiny being revealed and then joined by the dancers to perform choreographed hand movements together. The LED screens also projected pink block colours, which changed to green for the second verse, and pink strip lights and doors, while a pyrotechnic waterfall effect was also used during the final part of the performance. The creative director for the Maltese performance was Sacha Jean-Baptiste. The four dancers featured during the performance were: Jennifer Pacaanas, Kim Pastor, Milena Jacuniak and Pauline Eddeborn.

At the end of the show, Malta was announced as having finished in the top 10 and subsequently qualifying for the grand final. It was later revealed that Malta placed first in the semi-final, receiving a total of 325 points: 151 points from the televoting and 174 points from the juries.

=== Final ===
Shortly after the first semi-final, a winners' press conference was held for the ten qualifying countries. As part of this press conference, the qualifying artists took part in a draw to determine which half of the grand final they would subsequently participate in. This draw was done in the order the countries were announced during the semi-final. Malta was drawn to compete in the first half. Following this draw, the shows' producers decided upon the running order of the final, as they had done for the semi-finals. Malta was subsequently placed to perform in position 6, following the entry from Russia and before the entry from Portugal. On the day of the grand final, bookmakers considered Malta the third most likely country to win the competition.

Destiny once again took part in dress rehearsals on 21 and 22 May before the final, including the jury final where the professional juries cast their final votes before the live show. Destiny performed a repeat of her semi-final performance during the final on 22 May. Malta placed seventh in the final, scoring 255 points: 47 points from the televoting and 208 points from the juries.

=== Voting ===
Voting during the three shows involved each country awarding two sets of points from 1–8, 10 and 12: one from their professional jury and the other from televoting. Each nation's jury consisted of five music industry professionals who are citizens of the country they represent, with a diversity in gender and age represented. The judges assess each entry based on the performances during the second Dress Rehearsal of each show, which takes place the night before each live show, against a set of criteria including: vocal capacity; the stage performance; the song's composition and originality; and the overall impression by the act. Jury members may only take part in panel once every three years, and are obliged to confirm that they are not connected to any of the participating acts in a way that would impact their ability to vote impartially. Jury members should also vote independently, with no discussion of their vote permitted with other jury members. The exact composition of the professional jury, and the results of each country's jury and televoting were released after the grand final; the individual results from each jury member were also released in an anonymised form.

==== Points awarded to Malta ====
Points awarded to Malta (Semi-final 1)
| Score | Televote | Jury |
|---|---|---|
| 12 points | Belgium; Netherlands | Australia; Croatia; Cyprus; Ireland; Norway; Romania; Russia; Sweden |
| 10 points | Australia; Ireland; Israel; North Macedonia | Azerbaijan; Germany; North Macedonia |
| 8 points | Cyprus; Germany; Norway; Romania; Russia; Sweden; Ukraine | Belgium; Israel; Italy |
| 7 points | Croatia; Lithuania | Netherlands |
| 6 points | Azerbaijan; Italy | Lithuania; Slovenia |
| 5 points | Slovenia | Ukraine |
| 4 points | | |
| 3 points | | |
| 2 points | | |
| 1 point | | |

Points awarded to Malta (Final)
| Score | Televote | Jury |
|---|---|---|
| 12 points | | Australia; Norway; Romania; Sweden |
| 10 points | | Cyprus; Ireland |
| 8 points | Australia | Albania; Germany; Spain |
| 7 points | | Azerbaijan; Czech Republic; Italy; Moldova; Netherlands; San Marino |
| 6 points | United Kingdom | Greece; Switzerland |
| 5 points | Israel | Belgium; Bulgaria; Israel; North Macedonia; Slovenia; Ukraine |
| 4 points | Ireland | Austria; Denmark; Poland; Portugal; Russia |
| 3 points | Greece; Iceland; Norway; Spain | Croatia; Lithuania |
| 2 points | Austria; Belgium; Denmark; Romania; Sweden | Latvia |
| 1 point | Cyprus; Netherlands | Estonia; Finland; Georgia; Iceland |

==== Points awarded by Malta ====
Points awarded by Malta (Semi-final 1)
| Score | Televote | Jury |
|---|---|---|
| 12 points | Cyprus | Romania |
| 10 points | Sweden | Sweden |
| 8 points | Azerbaijan | Cyprus |
| 7 points | Lithuania | Ukraine |
| 6 points | Norway | Azerbaijan |
| 5 points | Israel | Slovenia |
| 4 points | Ukraine | Lithuania |
| 3 points | Romania | Croatia |
| 2 points | Russia | Ireland |
| 1 point | Ireland | Russia |

Points awarded by Malta (Final)
| Score | Televote | Jury |
|---|---|---|
| 12 points | Italy | Albania |
| 10 points | Norway | Switzerland |
| 8 points | Sweden | Sweden |
| 7 points | Finland | Portugal |
| 6 points | Lithuania | Greece |
| 5 points | Iceland | Ukraine |
| 4 points | Serbia | Cyprus |
| 3 points | France | France |
| 2 points | Cyprus | Finland |
| 1 point | Ukraine | San Marino |

==== Detailed voting results ====
The following members comprised the Maltese jury:

- Kevin Abela
- Annaliz Azzopardi
- Ira Losco
- Sigmund Mifsud
- Michela Pace

Detailed voting results from Malta (Semi-final 1)
| R/O | Country | Jury | | | | | | | Televote | |
| R/O | Country | Juror A | Juror B | Juror C | Juror D | Juror E | Rank | Points | Rank | Points |
|---|---|---|---|---|---|---|---|---|---|---|
| 01 | Lithuania | 14 | 4 | 4 | 6 | 15 | 7 | 4 | 4 | 7 |
| 02 | Slovenia | 6 | 13 | 1 | 9 | 7 | 6 | 5 | 15 | |
| 03 | Russia | 7 | 11 | 5 | 5 | 14 | 10 | 1 | 9 | 2 |
| 04 | Sweden | 9 | 2 | 14 | 4 | 1 | 2 | 10 | 2 | 10 |
| 05 | Australia | 10 | 14 | 12 | 3 | 9 | 12 | | 12 | |
| 06 | North Macedonia | 15 | 5 | 7 | 10 | 11 | 14 | | 11 | |
| 07 | Ireland | 5 | 15 | 13 | 13 | 2 | 9 | 2 | 10 | 1 |
| 08 | Cyprus | 8 | 6 | 15 | 1 | 3 | 3 | 8 | 1 | 12 |
| 09 | Norway | 3 | 12 | 9 | 12 | 10 | 11 | | 5 | 6 |
| 10 | Croatia | 11 | 7 | 8 | 7 | 4 | 8 | 3 | 14 | |
| 11 | Belgium | 4 | 8 | 10 | 14 | 12 | 13 | | 13 | |
| 12 | Israel | 12 | 9 | 6 | 11 | 13 | 15 | | 6 | 5 |
| 13 | Romania | 1 | 10 | 3 | 2 | 5 | 1 | 12 | 8 | 3 |
| 14 | Azerbaijan | 13 | 3 | 2 | 8 | 6 | 5 | 6 | 3 | 8 |
| 15 | Ukraine | 2 | 1 | 11 | 15 | 8 | 4 | 7 | 7 | 4 |
| 16 | Malta | | | | | | | | | |

Detailed voting results from Malta (Final)
| R/O | Country | Jury | | | | | | | Televote | |
| R/O | Country | Juror A | Juror B | Juror C | Juror D | Juror E | Rank | Points | Rank | Points |
|---|---|---|---|---|---|---|---|---|---|---|
| 01 | Cyprus | 16 | 21 | 2 | 6 | 7 | 7 | 4 | 9 | 2 |
| 02 | Albania | 3 | 22 | 3 | 3 | 19 | 1 | 12 | 18 | |
| 03 | Israel | 14 | 20 | 17 | 17 | 13 | 24 | | 21 | |
| 04 | Belgium | 11 | 18 | 18 | 18 | 14 | 21 | | 22 | |
| 05 | Russia | 13 | 16 | 21 | 14 | 16 | 23 | | 16 | |
| 06 | Malta | | | | | | | | | |
| 07 | Portugal | 22 | 1 | 19 | 12 | 2 | 4 | 7 | 15 | |
| 08 | Serbia | 6 | 17 | 25 | 20 | 9 | 18 | | 7 | 4 |
| 09 | United Kingdom | 12 | 3 | 23 | 11 | 20 | 15 | | 14 | |
| 10 | Greece | 20 | 11 | 4 | 1 | 11 | 5 | 6 | 17 | |
| 11 | Switzerland | 1 | 6 | 14 | 25 | 4 | 2 | 10 | 13 | |
| 12 | Iceland | 2 | 19 | 16 | 9 | 18 | 12 | | 6 | 5 |
| 13 | Spain | 24 | 10 | 20 | 21 | 24 | 25 | | 23 | |
| 14 | Moldova | 15 | 14 | 22 | 2 | 12 | 13 | | 24 | |
| 15 | Germany | 8 | 25 | 24 | 19 | 23 | 22 | | 19 | |
| 16 | Finland | 5 | 2 | 11 | 22 | 22 | 9 | 2 | 4 | 7 |
| 17 | Bulgaria | 25 | 7 | 6 | 16 | 10 | 16 | | 11 | |
| 18 | Lithuania | 19 | 8 | 7 | 13 | 15 | 17 | | 5 | 6 |
| 19 | Ukraine | 9 | 4 | 10 | 24 | 3 | 6 | 5 | 10 | 1 |
| 20 | France | 23 | 12 | 1 | 15 | 6 | 8 | 3 | 8 | 3 |
| 21 | Azerbaijan | 10 | 23 | 12 | 7 | 5 | 14 | | 12 | |
| 22 | Norway | 7 | 24 | 15 | 8 | 25 | 19 | | 2 | 10 |
| 23 | Netherlands | 17 | 13 | 8 | 10 | 21 | 20 | | 25 | |
| 24 | Italy | 18 | 9 | 13 | 4 | 8 | 11 | | 1 | 12 |
| 25 | Sweden | 21 | 15 | 5 | 5 | 1 | 3 | 8 | 3 | 8 |
| 26 | San Marino | 4 | 5 | 9 | 23 | 17 | 10 | 1 | 20 | |
