= You Don't Love Me (Sickotoy song) =

2019 song by Sickotoy

Single by Sickotoy featuring Roxen
- Released: 12 August 2019
- Length: 3:03
- Label: Global
- Composers: Sebastian Barac, Marcel Botezan and Sickotoy
- Lyricist: Minelli

Sickotoy singles chronology
"Addicted" (2019)	"You Don't Love Me" (2019)	"Dum Dum" (2020)

Roxen singles chronology
"You Don't Love Me" (2019)	"Ce-ți cântă dragostea" (2019)

"You Don't Love Me" is a song by Romanian producer Sickotoy, featuring the vocals of Romanian singer Roxen. Written by Minelli and composed by Sebastian Barac, Marcel Botezan and Sickotoy, it was digitally released by Global Records on 12 August 2019 as a single. An accompanying music video directed by Raluca Netca was uploaded to YouTube on 3 September 2019. Commercially, "You Don't Love Me" attained success, reaching number three in Romania and seven in Bulgaria.

== Background and release ==
"You Don't Love Me" was written by Minelli, while Sebastian Barac, Marcel Botezan and Sickotoy acted as composers. The track was released by Global Records for digital download and streaming on 12 August 2019 as a single. Additionally, a club edit and a remix were eventually released.

== Commercial performance ==
Upon release, "You Don't Love Me" attained commercial success. In native Romania, the song and its music video received notable airplay on radio stations and television, leading to its peak at number three on the Airplay 100 chart. "You Don't Love Me" further charted at number seven in Bulgaria, and was playslisted by radio stations in several territories including France, United States, Russia and Spain.

== Music video ==
An accompanying music video for the song was uploaded to Sickotoy's YouTube channel on 3 September 2019. It was directed by Raluca Netca, while Alexandru Mureșan was hired as the director of photography, Loops Production provided production and bmabid editing. The visual features Roxen residing in a club and interacting with several people; the use of strobe lightning is prominent.

== Credits and personnel ==
Credits adapted from YouTube.

Technical and songwriting credits

- Sebastian Barac – composer
- Marcel Botezan – composer
- Minelli – lyricist
- Sickotoy – composer

Visual credits

- Bmabid – editor
- Alexandru Mureșan – director of photography
- Loops Production – production
- Raluca Netca – director

== Track listing ==
- Digital download
1. "You Don't Love Me" (featuring Roxen) – 3:03
- Digital download (Alternative versions)
1. "You Don't Love Me" (featuring Roxen) [Club Edit] – 3:39
2. "You Don't Love Me" (featuring Roxen) [Mephisto & James Miller Remix] – 2:44

== Charts ==
=== Weekly charts ===
2019–2020 weekly chart performance for "You Don't Love Me"
Chart (2019–2020)	Peak position
Bulgaria Airplay (PROPHON)	7
Romania (Airplay 100)	3
Romania (Romanian Radio Airplay)	6
Romania (Romania TV Airplay)	3

2025 weekly chart performance for "You Don't Love Me"
Chart (2025)	Peak position
Moldova Airplay (TopHit)	29

2026 weekly chart performance for "You Don't Love Me"
Chart (2026)	Peak position
Moldova Airplay (TopHit)	25

=== Monthly charts ===
Monthly chart performance for "Soarele și luna"
Chart (2023)	Peak position
Moldova Airplay (TopHit)	33

=== Year-end charts ===
Chart (2019)	Position
Romania (Airplay 100)	73

Chart (2020)	Position
Romania (Airplay 100)	47

Year-end chart performance
Chart (2025)	Position
Moldova Airplay (TopHit)	164

== Release history ==
Country	Date	Format(s)	Label	Ref.
Various	12 August 2019	Digital download; streaming	Global	
