= Little Big discography =

Band discography

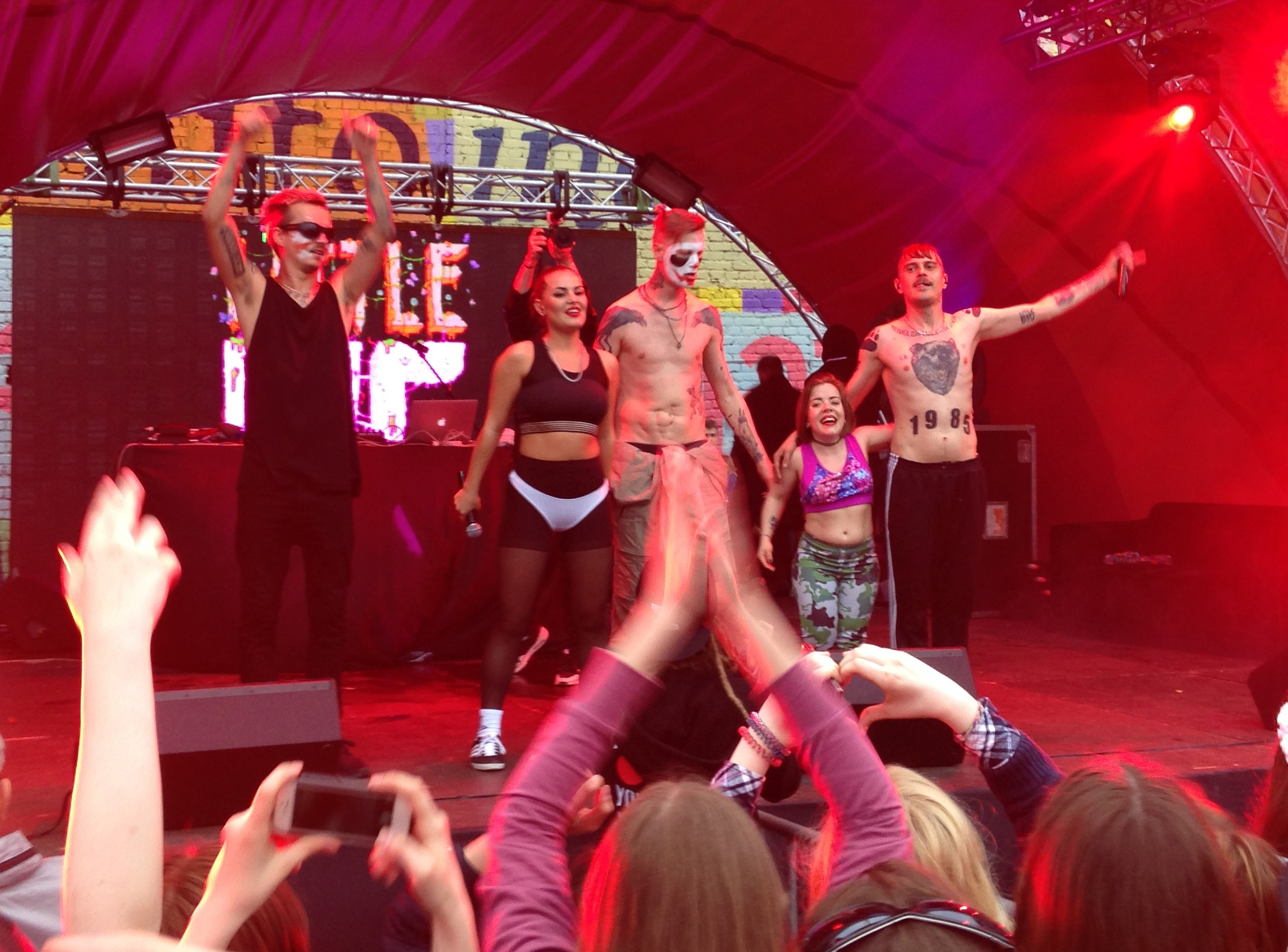
- Studio albums: 5
- EPs: 3
- Live albums: 1
- Compilation albums: 1

Russian punk-pop-rap group Little Big have released five studio albums and three EPs. In 2013, Little Big began writing their own records. The group's debut album With Russia From Love was released on 15 March 2014 & it consists of five singles: «Everyday I'm Drinking», «We Will Push A Button», «Life In Da Trash», «Russian Hooligans» & «With Russia From Love».

Their next album Funeral Rave was released on 21 December 2015. It reached eighth place on the Russian iTunes charts in week 52 in 2015 & fifth on Google Play. The album featured three singles: «Dead Unicorn», «Kind Inside, Hard Outside» & «Give Me Your Money» (feat. Tommy Cash).

At the beginning of 2017, the group released the single «U Can Take», in a duet with singer Tatarka.

On 8 May 2018 the group released the first part of their third album Antipositive & video «Punks Not Dead», 5 October — the second part of the album Antipositive & new video «Skibidi». the group's frontman Ilya Prusikin in their own vlog announced that the album Antipositive was split for technical reasons: the first part was released at a time they toured Europe in 2018, & the next part was released to coincide with their tour around Russia.

== Albums ==
=== Studio albums ===
Title	Details
With Russia From Love	Released: 15 March 2014; Format: Digital download, CD; Label: Little Big
Funeral Rave	Released: 21 December 2015; Format: Digital download, CD; Label: Little Big
Antipositive, Pt. 1	Released: 8 May 2018; Format: Digital download; Label: LB Family
Antipositive, Pt. 2	Released: 5 October 2018; Format: Digital download; Label: Warner Music Russia
Lobster Popstar	Released: 26 April 2024; Format: Digital download; Label: Little Big
Three Stripes Nation Pt. 1	Released: 4 September 2026; Format: Digital download; Label: Little Big

=== Live albums ===
Title	Details
Live in St. Petersburg	Released: March 15, 2019; Label: Warner Music Russia; Format: Digital download

=== Compilation albums ===
Title	Details
Greatest Hits	Released: 13 November 2020; Label: Warner Music Russia; Format: 2×LP

== Extended plays ==
Title	Details
Go Bananas	Released: November 14, 2019; Label: Warner Music Russia; Format: Digital download, streaming
Covers	Released: June 3, 2021; Label: Warner Music Russia; Format: Digital download, streaming
Welcome to the Internet (with Oliver Tree)	Released: September 30, 2021; Label: Atlantic; Format: Digital download, streaming

== Singles ==
Title	Year	Peak chart positions						Certifications	Album
Title	Year	RUS	EST	HUN	LIT	SCO	UK Down.	Certifications	Album
"Every Day I'm Drinking"	2013	—	—	—	—	—	—		With Russia From Love
"We Will Push a Button"	2013	—	—	—	—	—	—		With Russia From Love
"Russian Hooligans"	2013	—	—	—	—	—	—		With Russia From Love
"Dead Unicorn" (featuring Taras Umanskiy)	2013	—	—	—	—	—	—		Funeral Rave
"Life in Da Trash"	2013	—	—	—	—	—	—		With Russia From Love
"With Russia From Love"	2014	—	—	—	—	—	—		With Russia From Love
"Kind Inside, Hard Outside" (featuring Killaheadz)	2015	—	—	—	—	—	—		Funeral Rave
"Give Me Your Money" (featuring Tommy Cash)	2015	—	—	—	—	—	—		Funeral Rave
"U Can Take" (Tatarka featuring Little Big)	2017	—	—	—	—	—	—		Non-album single
"Rave On" (b/w "For Haters")	2017	—	—	—	—	—	—		Non-album single
"Lolly Bomb"	2017	—	—	—	—	—	—		Antipositive, Pt. 1
"Слэмятся пацаны" (with Ruki Vverh!)	2018	863	—	—	—	—	—		Non-album single
"Skibidi"	2019	122	—	—	—	—	—	ZPAV: Platinum	Antipositive, Pt. 2
"Skibidi (Romantic Edition)"	2019	—	—	—	—	—	—		Non-album single
"Rave in Peace (In Memory of Keith Flint)"	2019	—	—	—	—	—	—		Non-album single
"I'm OK"	2019	29	—	—	—	—	—		Non-album single
"Arriba" (with Tatarka featuring Clean Bandit)	2019	110	—	—	—	—	—		Non-album single
"Rock-Paper-Scissors"	2019	—	—	—	—	—	—		Go Bananas
"Go Bananas"	2019	93	—	—	—	—	—		Go Bananas
"Uno"	2020	7	9	21	33	97	81		Non-album single
"Hypnodancer"	2020	63	—	—	—	—	—		Non-album single
"Tacos"	2020	251	—	—	—	—	—		Non-album single
"Suck My Dick 2020"	2020	—	—	—	—	—	—		Non-album single
"Sex Machine"	2021	147	—	—	—	—	—		Non-album single
"We Are Little Big"	2021	—	—	—	—	—	—		Non-album single
"Everybody (Little Big's Back)"	2021	122	—	—	—	—	—		Covers
"Moustache" (featuring Netta)	2021	—	—	—	—	—	—		Non-album single
"Turn It Up" (with Oliver Tree featuring Tommy Cash)	2021	—	—	—	—	—	—		Welcome To The Internet
"A Lot of Money" (OST "Крысиные Бега")	2021	—	—	—	—	—	—		Non-album single
"Generation Cancellation"	2022	—	—	—	—	—	—		Non-album single
"Pendejo"	2023	—	—	—	—	—	—		Lobster Popstar
"We Are Like Flintstones"	2023	—	—	—	—	—	—		Lobster Popstar
"It Happens" (featuring bbno$)	2023	—	—	—	—	—	—		Lobster Popstar
"Hardstyle Fish" (with Little Sis Nora)	2024	—	—	—	—	—	—		Lobster Popstar
"Boobs"	2024	—	—	—	—	—	—		Lobster Popstar
"Big Dick (For Your Mom)"	2024	—	—	—	—	—	—		Non-album single
"Kurwa"	2024	—	—	—	—	—	—		Non-album single
"Hypnodancer (slowed down)"	2024	—	—	—	—	—	—		Non-album single
"Tchaikovsky"	2025	—	—	—	—	—	—		Non-album single
"Hardcore American Cowboy"	2025	—	—	—	—	—	—		Non-album single
"Hardcore American Cowboy 2.0" (with Lil Texas)	2025	—	—	—	—	—	—		Non-album single
"Hearts Accelerating" (with EXVCT & Polar)	2025	—	—	—	—	—	—		Non-album single
"Coco Copter"	2025	—	—	—	—	—	—		Non-album single
"21" (with Pixl Girl)	2025	—	—	—	—	—	—		Non-album single
"Skibidi (Rave Version)"	2025	—	—	—	—	—	—		Non-album single
"DAS ADIDAS"	2026	—	—	—	—	—	—		Three Stripes Nation Pt. 1
"TAKA TAKA" (with Faradenza)	2026	—	—	—	—	—	—		Three Stripes Nation Pt. 1
"—" stands for an entry which did not chart or was not released in that territory.

== Guest on albums ==
- 2015 — Darktek — «Russia Bitch!» (with Little Big) [«Bad Papa»]
- 2017 — Eskimo Callboy — «Nightlife» (featuring Little Big) [«The Scene»]
- 2020 — Finch Asozial — «Rave Religion» (featuring Little Big) [«Rave Religion»]
- 2020 — Finch Asozial — «Rave Religion» (featuring Little Big) [«Finchi's Love Tape»]

== Videography ==
The Little Big videography consists of 35 clips & one video album «Live in St. Petersburg».

No.	Year	Clip	Director	Album
1	2013	«Everyday I'm Drinking» on YouTube	Alina Pyazok	With Russia From Love
2	2013	«We Will Push A Button» on YouTube	Alina Pyazok	With Russia From Love
3	2013	«Life In Da Trash» on YouTube	Alina Pyazok	With Russia From Love
4	2013	«Russian Hooligans» on YouTube	Alina Pyazok	With Russia From Love
5	2014	«With Russia From Love» on YouTube	Alina Pyazok	With Russia From Love
6	2014	«Public Enemy» on YouTube	Alina Pyazok	With Russia From Love
7	2014	«Dead Unicorn» on YouTube	Ilya Prusikin, Pyazok	Funeral Rave
8	2015	«Kind Inside, Hard Outside» on YouTube	Pyazok, Prusikin	Funeral Rave
9	2015	«Give Me Your Money» on YouTube (при уч. Tommy Cash)	Pyazok, Prusikin, Tommy Cash	Funeral Rave
10	2016	«Big Dick» on YouTube	Pyazok, Prusikin	Funeral Rave
11	2016	«Hateful Love» on YouTube	Pyazok, Prusikin	Funeral Rave
12	2016	«Polyushko Polye» on YouTube	Pyazok, Prusikin	Funeral Rave
13	2017	«U Can Take» on YouTube (Tatarka при уч. Little Big)	Pyazok, Prusikin	Non-album single
14	2017	«Rave On» on YouTube	Pyazok, Prusikin	Rave On
15	2017	«Lolly Bomb» on YouTube	Pyazok, Prusikin	Antipositive, Pt. 1
16	2018	«Punks Not Dead» on YouTube	Pyazok, Prusikin	Antipositive, Pt. 1
17	2018	«Faradenza» on YouTube	Pyazok, Prusikin	Antipositive, Pt. 1
18	2018	«Ak-47» on YouTube	Maksim Semenov	Antipositive, Pt. 1
19	2018	«Skibidi» on YouTube	Pyazok, Prusikin	Antipositive, Pt. 2 и «Skibidi»
20	2018	«Слэмятся пацаны» on YouTube (совместно с Руки Вверх!)	Misha Semichev	Non-album single
21	2019	«Skibidi» on YouTube (Romantic Edition)	Pyazok, Prusikin	Skibidi
22	2019	«I’m OK» on YouTube	Pyazok, Prusikin	Non-album single
23	2019	«Rock-Paper-Scissors» on YouTube	Pyazok, Prusikin	Go Bananas
24	2019	«Go Bananas» on YouTube	Pyazok, Prusikin	Go Bananas
25	2020	«UNO» on YouTube	Pyazok	Non-album single
26	2020	«Hypnodancer» on YouTube	Pyazok, Prusikin, Yuri Muzychenko	Non-album single
27	2020	«Tacos» on YouTube	Pyazok, Prusikin	Non-album single
28	2020	«Suck My Dick 2020» on YouTube	Pyazok, Prusikin	Non-album single
29	2021	«Sex Machine» on YouTube	Pyazok, Prusikin	Non-album single
30	2021	«We are Little big» on YouTube	Pyazok	Non-album single
31	2021	«Everybody (Little Big Are Back)» on YouTube	Pyazok, Prusikin	Covers
32	2021	«Mustache» on YouTube (совместно с Netta)	Pyazok, Prusikin	Non-album single
33	2021	«Turn It Up» on YouTube (совместно с Tommy Cash и Oliver Tree)	Pyazok, Prusikin, Oliver Tree	Welcome To The Internet
34	2021	«A Lot Of Money» (OST «Крысиные Бега») on YouTube	Pyazok	Non-album single
35	2022	«Generation Cancellation» on YouTube	Pyazok, Prusikin	Non-album single

=== Concert videoalbums ===
- 2015 — «American Russians» (Little Big & Tommy Cash serial)

=== Participation ===
- 2014 — Noize MC — «Капитан Америка (Не берёт трубу)»
- 2016 — The Hatters — «Russian Style»
- 2017 – Electric Callboy – "Nightlife"
- 2018 — The Hatters — «Forever Young Forever Drunk» (feat. Just Femi)
- 2019 — Animal Jazz — «Чувства»
- 2019 — Злой Малой — «В долгий путь» (1 раунд 17ib)
- 2020 – Finch Asozial – «Rave Religion»
- 2020 — Aleksandr Gudkov — «Самоизоляция»
- 2021 – The Hatters – «Everyday I'm Drinking (feat. Little Big) – Live 2021
- 2021 — Cream Soda — «Подожгу»
- 2022 — Glukoza — «Ebobo»
