= Little Big videography =

Videography of Russian band Little Big

The videography of Russian punk-rave group Little Big consists of one concert album and 35 music videos (one as a guest performer) beginning in 2013. The directors for most of the videos are Alina Pyazok and Ilya Prusikin.

== Videography ==
The videography of Litte Big consists of 34 videos and one video album, «Live in St. Petersburg».

=== Videos ===
No.	Year	Video	Director	Album
1	2013	«Everyday I'm Drinking» on YouTube	Alina Pyazok	«With Russia From Love»
2	2013	«We Will Push A Button» on YouTube	Alina Pyazok	«With Russia From Love»
3	2013	«Life In Da Trash» on YouTube	Alina Pyazok	«With Russia From Love»
4	2013	«Russian Hooligans» on YouTube	Alina Pyazok	«With Russia From Love»
5	2014	«With Russia From Love» on YouTube	Alina Pyazok	«With Russia From Love»
6	2014	«Public Enemy» on YouTube	Alina Pyazok	«With Russia From Love»
7	2014	«Dead Unicorn» on YouTube	Ilya Prusikin, Alina Pyazok	«Funeral Rave»
8	2015	«Kind Inside, Hard Outside» on YouTube	Alina Pyazok, Ilya Prusikin	«Funeral Rave»
9	2015	«Give Me Your Money» on YouTube (feat. Tommy Cash)	Ilya Prusikin, Alina Pyazok, Tomas Tammemets	«Funeral Rave»
10	2016	«Big Dick» on YouTube	Alina Pyazok, Ilya Prusikin	«Funeral Rave»
11	2016	«Hateful Love» on YouTube	Ilya Prusikin, Alina Pyazok	«Funeral Rave»
12	2016	«Polyushko Polye» on YouTube	Alina Pyazok, Ilya Prusikin	«Funeral Rave»
13	2017	«U Can Take» on YouTube (Tatarka feat. Little Big)	Ilya Prusikin, Alina Pyazok	Non-album single
14	2017	«Rave On» on YouTube	Ilya Prusikin, Alina Pyazok	«Rave On» - EP
15	2017	«LollyBomb» on YouTube	Ilya Prusikin, Alina Pyazok	«Antipositive, Pt. 1»
16	2018	«Punks Not Dead» on YouTube	Ilya Prusikin, Alina Pyazok	«Antipositive, Pt. 1»
17	2018	«Faradenza» on YouTube	Alina Pyazok, Ilya Prusikin	«Antipositive, Pt. 1»
18	2018	«Ak-47» on YouTube	Максим Семенов	«Antipositive, Pt. 1»
19	2018	«Skibidi» on YouTube	Alina Pyazok, Ilya Prusikin	«Antipositive, Pt. 2» «Skibidi» - EP
20	2018	«Слэмятся пацаны» on YouTube (with Руки Вверх!)	Misha Semichev	Non-album single
21	2019	«Skibidi» on YouTube (Romantic Edition)	Alina Pyazok, Ilya Prusikin	«Skibidi» - EP
22	2019	«I’m OK» on YouTube	Alina Pyazok, Ilya Prusikin	Non-album single
23	2019	«Rock-Paper-Scissors» on YouTube	Alina Pyazok, Ilya Prusikin	«Go Bananas» - EP
24	2019	«Go Bananas» on YouTube	Alina Pyazok, Ilya Prusikin	«Go Bananas» - EP
25	2020	«UNO» on YouTube	Alina Pyazok	Non-album single
26	2020	«Hypnodancer» on YouTube	Alina Pyazok, Ilya Prusikin, Yuri Muzychenko	Non-album single
27	2020	«Tacos» on YouTube	Alina Pyazok, Ilya Prusikin	Non-album single
28	2020	«Suck My Dick 2020» on YouTube	Alina Pyazok, Ilya Prusikin	Non-album single
29	2021	«Sex Machine» on YouTube	Alina Pyazok, Ilya Prusikin	Non-album single
30	2021	«We are Little big» on YouTube	Alina Pyazok	Non-album single
31	2021	«Everybody (Little Big Are Back)» on YouTube	Alina Pyazok, Ilya Prusikin	Covers
32	2021	«Mustache» on YouTube (with Netta)	Alina Pyazok, Ilya Prusikin	Non-album single
33	2021	«Turn It Up» on YouTube (with Tommy Cash & Oliver Tree)	Alina Pyazok, Ilya Prusikin, Oliver Tree	«Welcome To The Internet»
34	2021	«A Lot Of Money» (OST «Крысиные Бега») on YouTube	Alina Pyazok	Non-album single
35	2022	«Generation Cancellation» on YouTube	Alina Pyazok, Ilya Prusikin	Non-album single
36	2023	«Pendejo» on YouTube	Alina Pyazok, Ilya Prusikin	Non-album single

=== Serials ===
- 2015 — «American Russians» (Little Big & Tommy Cash serial)

=== Video albums ===
- 2019 — «Live in St. Petersburg»

=== Guests ===
- 2014 — Noize MC — «Капитан Америка (Не берёт трубу)»
- 2016 — The Hatters — «Russian Style»
- 2018 — The Hatters — «Forever Young Forever Drunk» (feat. Just Femi)
- 2019 — Animal Jazz — «Чувства»
- 2019 — Злой Малой — «В долгий путь» (1 раунд 17ib)
- 2020 — Music Studio of Aleksandr Gudkov — «Самоизоляция»
- 2021 — Cream Soda — «Подожгу»
- 2022 — Glukoza — «Ebobo»
