= Tacos (song) =

Single by Little Big
- Released: 14 August 2020
- Genre: Pop
- Songwriter: Ilya Prusikin
- Producers: Sonya Tayurskaya, Victor Sibrinin, We love Khomchuk, Ilya Prusikin

Little Big singles chronology
"Hypnodancer" (2020)	"Tacos" (2020)	"Suck My Dick 2020" (2020)

"Tacos" is a single from Russian punk-pop-rave group Little Big. The single was released on August 14, 2020, via Warner Music Russia and Little Big Family. The song was dedicated to the traditional Mexican dish tacos.

== Music video ==
The music video for the song was released on 14 August 2020 on the Little Big official YouTube channel, the same day the single was released. The music video featured Dmitry Krasilov, who previously starred in the video for 'UNO'.

In the video, the members of the group are turned into food.

The plot of the video, dancer Dmitry Krasilov, after filming the video for the song 'UNO', comes in to the kitchen, takes off his jacket, puts on a dressing gown and puts a plate with a sandwich in the microwave. While the food is warming up, the food on the desk transforms into the members of the group and start dancing in front of Krasilov. Krasilov thinks he is going crazy, but as the microwave finishes, the food returns to normal. Exhaling, he takes out the sandwich and leaves.
