= Ciao, 2020! =

Russian New Year's Eve program

- Screenplay by: Denis Rtishchev
- Directed by: Roman Butovsky
- Starring: Ivan Urgant; Dmitry Khrustalev; Alexander Gudkov; Alla Mikheeva
- Country of origin: Russia
- Original language: Italian (Russian subtitles)

Production
- Producers: Ivan Urgant; Andrey Boltenko; Alexander Faifman; Konstantin Ernst

Original release
- Network: Channel One Russia
- Release: 30 December 2020

Ciao, 2020! is the New Year's edition of the Evening Urgant program, which aired on Channel One on 30 December 2020.

The release parodies holiday concerts of 1980s Italian pop music and traditions of Soviets, and later Little Blue Light (airing on rival VGTRK). All participants in the program, presenters and performers, have stylized Italian names and pseudonyms. Although the show's language is Italian, it has Russian subtitles.

The YouTube version of the show has been featured in many Italian media outlets. In four days, the video had been viewed 4.5 million times.

== Production ==
=== Background ===
The show, hosted by Ivan Urgant as pseudonym Giovanni Urganti, is a parody of the traditional Soviet, and later Russian, TV show Little Blue Light through the reconstruction of popular Italian music programs of the 1980s such as Drive In, Popcorn, and Discoring. According to Urgant, the film crew felt connected to old Italian music festivals as the artists changed songs and sang in Italian. Italy is associated with the popularity of Italian pop music in Russia in the last decades of the USSR, particularly from the Sanremo Music Festival. The artists associated with Urgant continued to give concerts in Russia and performed at retro festivals decades after the collapse of the USSR. Similar concerts were broadcast on Russian TV channels during the New Year's period.

The program reinterprets popular Italian dance moves and songs at that time. The show included fonts closely associated to the 1980s as well as neon lamps and Italian fashion at the time: mustaches, baggy clothes, long hair, shoulder pads, leggings, sequins, Lurex, and animal prints. Musical numbers are interspersed with sketches. Sketches include interviews of the presenter with fictitious famous people, whose actions and remarks are written into the script. The directorial techniques of Italian programs of the time are imitated, including shots with guests dancing in front of the camera while the artists perform their songs on stage. All songs played in the program, with the exception of the techno remake of the song "Mamma Maria" by Ricchi e Poveri, are adaptations of popular hits by the artists who took part in the recording of the program and traditional Russian New Year's songs. The lyrics are translated into Italian to fit like an Italian stage of the time period from the mid-1970s to the early 1990s.

=== Italian popular culture ===
References to Italian popular culture are not limited to historic music programs and festivals. For example, the musical number "Credo" is inspired by the film The Taming Of The Scoundrel. The lyrics of some songs contain references to places, people, and events that were relevant at the time of the program's release. Examples of this are demonstrated in the song "Piango al Tecno"; the street Kuznetsky Most and Russian DJ Nina Kravitz are mentioned. During a commercial break announced by the host, viewers see a skit for a fictitious cleaning product named Buono. The finale of the program uses an original excerpt from the Soviet film The Irony of Fate, or Enjoy Your Bath!, with the creators of the film dubbing the scene in Italian. The program also references current Russian events and culture at the time of release. Although the interviews with the participants are staged, they often play on real topics from their own personal lives or careers; for example, the actresses in the spoof TV series "Quattro Putane" are actresses of the Russian TV series "Chiki", which is about the lives of prostitutes. Some of the jokes are based on the pronunciation of Italian words for Russian-speaking people, with the artists speaking with a strong accent and mispronouncing many words.

=== Legacy ===
On 26 February 2021, the Warner Music Russia label released the album CIAO 2020, which included 12 tracks.

On 25 June 2021, in the final episode of the program, Vittorio Saltichieri's "Notte Bianca" was shown, filmed in St. Petersburg during the white nights in the style of Ciao, 2020!. The original song is a composition performed by Viktor Saltykov, "White Night", and the clip contains references to the movie The Incredible Adventures of Italians in Russia.

== Plot ==
Ivan Urgant is in the editing room of the Evening Urgant. He reveals that the production team made the decision not to shoot the New Year's special due to the COVID-19 pandemic, as they will have "no desire, no mood, and no strength". Instead, he reports that the audience will see the Italian New Year's music show Ciao, 2020!.

After the introduction, the first musical number, "Cinque minuti" («Пять минут», or «Five minutes»), is performed by host Giovanni Urganti (played by Urgant) and the group Tutti Frutti. The host announces the names of celebrities who are participating in the episode, and the audience is shown cards with greetings on them. Urganti introduces his co-hosts Matteo Crustaldi, Alessandro Gudini, and Allegra Michele, who appear on stage with him.

"Crush" by Claudia Cocchi and Niletto Niletti plays next, the latter singer appearing on stage in roller skates. The program continues with an interview with porn director Alessandro Pallini, who on the screen of the video camera shows the presenter a fragment from his new film, at the sight of which Urgani becomes delighted, exclaiming “Fantastic! Film without women! Only men!”, he calls the film crew to watch the clip with him and Pallini.

Next, Joni performs the song "La Cometa" in front of a huge screen, on which close-ups of the artist are mixed with shots of the starry sky. Urganti and Crustaldi interview Ornella Buzzi, after which musical duo Arti and Asti perform the song "Bambina balla", moving around the stage on an illuminated crescent moon decoration. Then, Gudini interviews Milanka and Gerolomo Paffuto.

Crema de la Soda performs the song "Piango al Tecno", with backup dancers consisting of a gladiator, a player from the Turin Juventus, a dancer in a white cassock dressed as Pius XIII from the TV series The Young Pope, Donatella Versace's double, a Swiss Guard, and dancers dressed as Madonna from the cover of Like a Virgin, one of Madonna's albums.

Urganti and Michele raffle lotto prizes among the spectators, along with Gigi. Dora sings "Innamorata", followed by a commercial for the fictional cleaner product company "Buono", in which Crustaldi, dressed as Santa Claus, finds his wife (played by Michele) in bed with another man, after which she invites Crustaldi to join them, which he does.

Urganti interviews Nicola Basca and Daniele Milocchi, who then sing the song "La Baldoria". Urganti interviews musical group Tutti Frutti, after which Giorgio Creddi performs the song "Ragazza copertina". Urganti interviews the actresses of the Quattro putane series: Barbara Cinicchio, Elenuccia Michelucci and Irene Nosa. The host asks why the fourth actress (alluding to the name of the series, quattro from the Italian "four"), Irene Gorbachetti, is missing, to which he receives the answer "She works!" After that, the actresses compete in swallowing spaghetti with Alessandro Gudini, and Giovanni Dorni, while a ballet dancer in a robot costume perform a number for the song "Cicchi", the soundtrack to the series.

Urganti and Gudini interview Ida Galicci, after which Giulia Ziverti performs the song "Credo". Urganti interviews Enrico Carlacci. The group Piccolo Grandi performs the song "Mamma Maria", after which Gudini presents them with a diploma for winning the Eurovision Song Contest.

The program reaches its grand finale when Pope Pippo II appears on the stage, sanctioning the beginning of the New Year by lighting the lights on the tree with an extension cord. In the end, Urganti, Soldinetta, and Vittorio Isaiah sing the song "Chiesi io al frassino" and the program participants make New Year's wishes to the audience.

== Popularity ==
Posted on the Evening Urgant YouTube channel, Ciao 2020! trended in both Russia and Italy. On 5 January 2021, the video became the most-watched video at that time within Italy. According to Italian media reports, Ciao 2020! became one of the most discussed topics at the beginning of 2021 among Italian-speaking users of social networks and instant messengers. The editorial staff of the TgCom24 TV channel website called the video a "phenomenon", comparing references to the show in the early days. The program was trending on Twitter in the country of Italy. For Italians, the video became a source of memes in the form of screenshots, videos, and character quotes. Some performances gained independent popularity on social media among Italians, especially the number "Piango al tecno".

After the release of Evening Urgant from the winter holidays on 29 January 2021, an episode was aired in which Ciao, 2020! was discussed with Italian Ambassador to Russia Pasquale Terracciano.

== Reception ==
=== In Russian media ===
In the Russian media, the program was mainly discussed in the context of its popularity in Italy and the reaction of Italians to the program, according to Rossiyskaya Gazeta. Many other publications noted that the program continues the Russian tradition of New Year's TV shows, which began with the 1994 New Year's karaoke program on NTV, authored and hosted by Leonid Parfenov. The most famous example of this tradition is a series of telemusicals Old songs about the main thing. Karmunin saw escapism in this trend, and the desire of the audience to escape from modern realities. Journalist Ana Mongait supported him, linking the appearance of such a program with the fear of the future by modern man and saying that "there is no strategic plan for what can happen tomorrow". Musical portal The Flow positively evaluated the "piercing pop version" of the song "I'm in love", as well as remixes of "Crying for Techno" and "Mamma Maria" presented in the program. Among the sketches, the editors noted the musical number with Dzhugan in the role of Gigi. According to music critic Anton Vagin, expressed in his article on the musical results of 2020 on "Afisha Daily", participation in the program of Dani Milokhin "legitimized TikTok-pop for everyone".

=== In Italian media ===
Rosalba Casteletti of la Repubblica described Ciao, 2020! as a "comedic masterpiece" and a "grotesque satire, but above all great declaration of love for Italy". The Italian tabloid website Dagospia called the show "the only real Italian New Year's celebration on TV". The Italian Huffington Post called the show "a masterpiece of trash". Cristiano Sala of Il Messaggero wrote that the stereotypes of television of the past in Ciao, 2020! were turned into "creative gems", calling the program "one of the funniest shows" and a "wonderful message that brought people together during a forced separation".

== Ciao, 2021! ==
On 1 January 2022, a sequel called Ciao, 2021! premiered on Channel One.

At the end of the program, Vladimir Putin's New Year's greeting in Italian (created by a neural network) is shown at the Colosseum. The second program was praised by the Italian media.

== Song list ==
Number	Performer	Role	Original song (parody)
1	Ivan Urgant and the group 'Frukty'	Giovanni Urganti and the group 'Tutti Frutti'	Cinque minuti (Пять минут)
2	Niletto and Klava Koka	Niletto Niletti and Claudia Coca	Crush (Краш)
3	JONY	JONY	La Cometa (Комета)
4	Artik & Asti	Arti and Asti	Bambina balla (Девочка танцуй)
5	Cream Soda	Crema de la Soda	Piango al tecno (Плачу на техно)
6	Dora	La Dora	Innamorata (Втюрилась)
7	Danya Milokhin and Nikolay Baskov	Daniele Milocchi and Nicola Basca	La Baldoria (Дико тусим)
8	Egor Kreed	Giorgio Criddi	Ragazza copertina (Девочка с картинки)
9	Ivan Dorn	Giovanni Dorni	Cicchi (Чики)
10	Zivert	Giulia Ziverti	Credo (Credo)
11	Little Big	«Piccolo Grandi»	Mamma Maria (Mamma Maria)
12	Monetochka, Vitya Isaev, and Ivan Urgant	Soldinetta, Vittoria Isaia, and Giovanni Urganti	Chiesi io al frassino (Я спросил у ясеня)

== Cast ==
Actor	Role
Ivan Urgant	Giovanni Urganti
Group 'Frukty'	Group 'Tutti Frutti'
Dmitry Khrustalev	Matteo Crustaldi
Alexander Gudkov	Alessandro Gudini
Alla Mikheeva	Allegra Michele
Niletto	Niletto Niiletti
Klava Koka	Claudia Cocca
Alexander Pal	Alessandro Pallini
JONY	Joni (JONY)
Olga Buzova	Omella Buzzi (Ornella Buzzi)
Artik & Asti	Arti and Asti (Arti e Asti)
Maria Minogarova	Milanka
Dmitry Krasilov	Gerolomo Paffuto
Cream Soda	group 'Crema De La Soda'
Djigan	Gigi (Gigi)
Dora	Dora (La Dora)
Nikolay Baskov	Nicola Bascha
Danya Milokhin	Danielle Milocchi
Egor Creed	Giorgio Criddi
Vavara Shmykova	Barbara Cinicchio, actress of the TV series Quattro putane
Alena Mikhailova	Elenuccia Michellucci, actress of the TV series Quattro putane
Irina Nosova	Irene Noza, actress of the TV series Quattro putane
Ivan Dorn	Giovanni Dorni
Ida Galich	Ida Galicci
Zivert	Julia Ziverti
Garik Kharlamov	Enrico Carlacci
Little Big	Group 'Piccolo Grandi'
Philip Kirkorov	Pope Pippo II
Monetochka	Soldinetta (LA Soldinetta)
BCH (Vitya Isaev)	Vittorio Isaia
DAVA	Dava
Stanislav Kruglitsky (Stas Prosto Klass)	Stassi Primo Classi
