= Hypnodancer =

2020 Single by Little Big

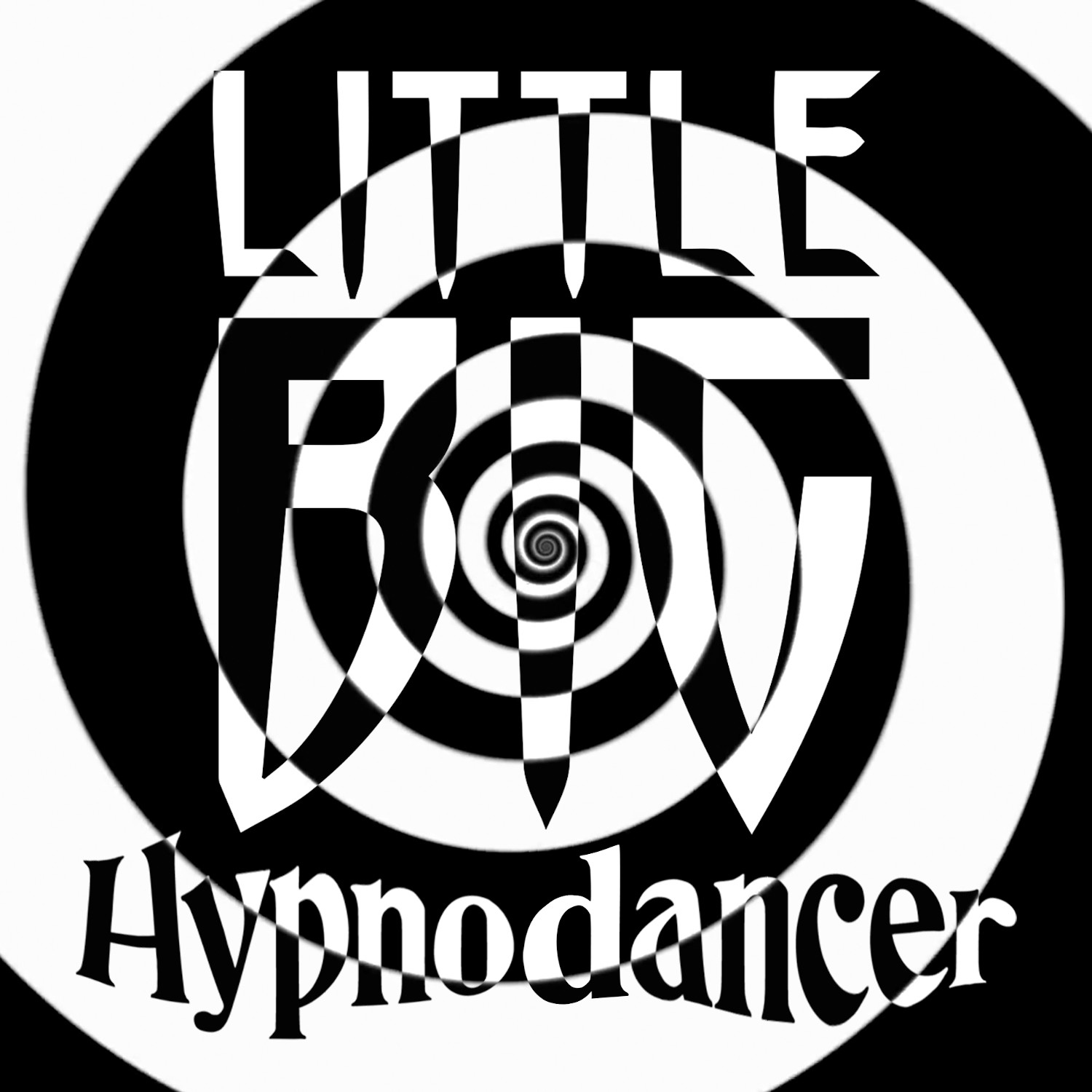

Single by Little Big
- Published: 8 May 2020
- Genre: Pop
- Length: 3:07
- Label: Warner Music Russia, Little Big family
- Songwriters: Ilya Prusikin, Deniz Zuckerman, Denis Guzel
- Producers: Ilya Prusikin, Victor Sibrinin

Little Big singles chronology
"Uno" (2020)	"Hypnodancer" (2020)	"Tacos" (2020)

"Hypnodancer" is a song by the Russian punk-rave group Little Big, released on 8 May 2020 via Warner Music Russia and Little Big family. It was the first song to be released by the group after the single "Uno".

== Music video ==
In addition to the usual group members, other celebrities took part in the video including: showman Alexander Gudkov, frontman of The Hatters, Yuri Muzychenko, vocalist of the Leningrad group Florida Chanturia, bloggers Ruslan Usachev and Danila Poperechny. The video was shot in St. Petersburg.

The plot of the video revolves around a group (Played by the members of Little Big), who visit various casinos, where the main character (Ilya Prusikin) jumps on the table and begins to dance a hypnotic dance, while his accomplices collect money from other players, after which they leave together. In one of the casinos, another hypnotist is found (Yuri Muzychenko) and a dance battle begins. The police arrive and they dance together called 'Double Hypno Dancer' and quietly leave together.

== Success ==
The music video hit YouTube trends in 26 countries, and in Russia, Latvia, Ukraine, Estonia and Belarus, it took 1st place in the charts.

In the first hour of the videos upload, it was viewed 473,000 times, and 1 million times in the first three hours. In the first two days, it had 12.5 million views, and in 10 days, it had 33 million views.

The music video was ranked #5 on the international weekly chart of the most watched video on YouTube on 14 May 2020.

== Certifications ==
Certifications for "Hypnodancer"
Region	Certification	Certified units/sales
Poland (ZPAV)	Gold	25,000^{‡}
^{‡} Sales+streaming figures based on certification alone.
