= Skibidi (Little Big song) =

2018 dance song and viral music video by Little Big

Single by Little Big

from the album Antipositive, Pt. 2
- Released: 5 October 2018
- Genre: Pop; dance; EDM; hip house
- Length: 2:43
- Label: SBA Music Publishing; Warner Music Russia
- Songwriters: Ilya Prusikin; Lyubim Khomchuk

Little Big singles chronology
"Слэмятся пацаны" (2018)	"Skibidi" (2019)	"Rave in Peace (In Memory of Keith Flint)" (2019)

Music video
- "Skibidi" on YouTube

"Skibidi" (/ˈskɪb.ɪ.di/, SKIB-ih-dee) is a dance song by Russian rave band Little Big. It was released on 5 October 2018 along with their album Antipositive, Pt. 2 on Warner Music Russia. Ilya Prusikin and the media producer of the group "Khleb", Lyubim Khomchuk, were credited for writing.

The song became a hit in autumn 2018. The single, re-released on 22 February 2019, debuted at number 2 on Top Radio & YouTube Hits. The song achieved wider fame due to the music video that was released on the day of the album's premiere.

On 26 January 2019, the music video won the category "Hype of the year" of the Ketnet award "Het Gala van de Gouden K's 2018", which took place in Antwerp, Belgium. The song was also nominated for the "ZD Awards-2018" for "Trends of the Year" and "Hype of the Year", which were presented on 28 February 2019. On 16 February 2019, the music video was awarded the "Chart's Dozen" prize for "Best video". On 10 April of the same year, the video was nominated for the awards for "Best video" and "Best Song in a Foreign Language" at the Muz-TV 2019 awards.

The song became an internet meme in late 2018, in part due to the "Skibidi Challenge". The song debuted No. 1 on Tophit in the Russian Commonwealth, where it stayed for two weeks.

"Skibidi" is included in the soundtrack for Just Dance 2020.

== Music video ==
The music video for "Skibidi" was released alongside the song on 5 October 2018. As of 26 July 2024, the video has over 746 million views. The music video was directed by the band's producer, Alina Pasok.

=== Skibidi Challenge ===
When the video went viral, Little Big challenged fans to post their own Skibidi dance videos, which they called the "Skibidi Challenge".

In October 2018, on the British television program This Week, host Andrew Neil challenged his guest panelists Michael Portillo, a British journalist and former politician, and British Labour Party politician Caroline Flint to dance the Skibidi. Guest Bobby Gillespie remained still on the set as the three unsuccessfully tried to perform the dance, which became an internet meme of its own.

== Track listing ==
1. "Skibidi" – 2:43
2. "Skibidi (Romantic Edition)" – 3:13
3. "Skibidi (Doorly Remix)" – 5:23
4. "Skibidi (LAUD Remix)" – 2:23
5. "Skibidi (Extended Mix)" – 3:09

== Charts ==
=== Weekly charts ===
Weekly chart performance for "Skibidi"
Chart (2018)	Peak position
Belarus Airplay (Eurofest)	112
CIS Airplay (TopHit)	196
Ukraine Airplay (TopHit)	28

== Certifications ==
Certifications for "Skibidi"
Region	Certification	Certified units/sales
Poland (ZPAV)	Platinum	20,000^{‡}
^{‡} Sales+streaming figures based on certification alone.
