= I'm OK (song) =

Single by Little Big
- Released: 14 June 2019
- Length: 3:07
- Label: Warner Music Russia, Little Big Family
- Songwriter(s): Ilya Prusikin
- Producer(s): The Hatters, Denis Zuckerman, Viktor Sibrinin, Ilya Prusikin

Little Big singles chronology
"Rave In Peace (In Memory of Keith Flint)" (2019)	"I'm OK" (2019)	"Arriba (with Tatarka featuring Clean Bandit)" (2019)

"I'm OK" is a song by Russian punk-pop-rave group Little Big. The song was released on 14 June 2019 by Warner Music Russia and Little Big Family.

== Music video ==
The music video was released as the same time as the single. The action in the video takes place at a bar. Ilya comes to the bar, drinks alcohol and tries to meet a girl, but fails. In parallel with him, Sonya Tayurskaya is trying to get a man, but fails as well. By the end of the video, they both end up together. In addition to the band members, other celebrities make appearances in the video, such as Yuri Muzychenko (frontman of The Hatters), Arseniy Popov (participant in the Improvisational show 'Импровизация'), Nikolai Kiselev (co-owner of the El copitas bar, which is in the top 30 bars in the world), among many others.. The video was directed by Ilya Prusikin and Alina Pyazok. During the first day, the video collected about 5 million views and took first position in the YouTube trends in Russia. The popularity of the clip spawned a new flash mob from Little Big.

== Awards and nominations ==
Year	Prize	Category	Result
2020	TopHit Music Awards 2020	Best video on YouTube in Russia (mixed vocals)	Expected

== Personnel ==
- Ilya "Ilyich" Prusikin – vocals
- Sofia Tayurskaya – vocals

=== Production ===
- The Hatters – producer
- Denis Zukerman – producer
- Victor Sibrinin – producer
- Ilya Prusikin – producer
- Anastasia Antipova – executive producer

== Certifications ==
Certifications for "I'm OK"
Region	Certification	Certified units/sales
Poland (ZPAV)	Gold	25,000^{‡}
^{‡} Sales+streaming figures based on certification alone.
