= Russia in the Eurovision Song Contest 2020 =

- Eurovision Song Contest 2020
- Country: Russia
- Selection process: Internal selection
- Announcement date: Artist: 2 March 2020; Song: 12 March 2020

Competing entry
- Song: "Uno"
- Artist: Little Big
- Songwriters: Denis Tsukerman; Ilya Prusikin; Viktor Sibrinin

Placement
- Final result: Contest cancelled

Participation chronology

Russia was set to be represented at the Eurovision Song Contest 2020 with the song "Uno", performed by Little Big. The entry, written by Denis Tsukerman, Ilya Prusikin and Viktor Sibrinin, was selected internally. The group was also internally selected by the Russian broadcaster Channel One Russia (C1R). However, due to the COVID-19 pandemic, the contest was cancelled.

== Background ==
Prior to the 2021 contest, Russia had participated in the Eurovision Song Contest 22 times since its first entry in 1994. Russia had won the contest on one occasion in 2008 with the song "Believe" performed by Dima Bilan. In 2016, Russia finished third with the song "You Are the Only One" performed by Sergey Lazarev, who would later return to represent his country again in 2019 with the song "Scream", also finishing in third place.

== Before Eurovision ==
=== Internal selection ===
The Russian entry for the Eurovision Song Contest 2020 was internally selected by the selection committee consisting of representatives of Channel One Russia (C1R) and music industry professionals. Among acts rumoured by several Russian media sites to be considered by the broadcaster were Aleksandr Panayotov, Little Big, Polina Gagarina and Zivert. On 2 March 2020, C1R announced Little Big as the Russian entrant at the Eurovision Song Contest 2020. The song selection consisted of two songs: "Tacos" and "Uno". In the end, the song "Uno" was chosen to represent Russia and was released on 12 March 2020 together with the official music video.

== At Eurovision ==
The Eurovision Song Contest 2020 was due to take place at Rotterdam Ahoy in Rotterdam, the Netherlands, with two semi finals on 12 and 14 May and the final on 16 May 2020. Russia were due to compete in the first half of the first semi final on 12 May. However, due to the COVID-19 pandemic, the contest was cancelled.
