= I'm OK =

I'm OK may refer to:

- I'm OK (album), a 1999 album by David Tao
- "I'm OK" (song), by Little Big, 2019
- I'm O.K – A Murder Simulator, a 2006 video game
- "I'm OK", a song by Christina Aguilera from the 2002 album Stripped

== See also ==
- I'm OK – You're OK, a 1967 self-help book by psychiatrist Thomas Anthony Harris
- I'm OK, You're OK (album), a 2007 album Jason Falkner
