= Skibidi =

Skibidi may refer to:

- "Skibidi" (Little Big song), 2018
- "Skibidi" (Girls' Generation-HRS song), 2026
- "Skibidi", a slang term popularized in the 2020s

== See also ==
- Skibidi Toilet, a YouTube web-series
