= The Hatters (band) =

Russian gypsy-folk-rock band

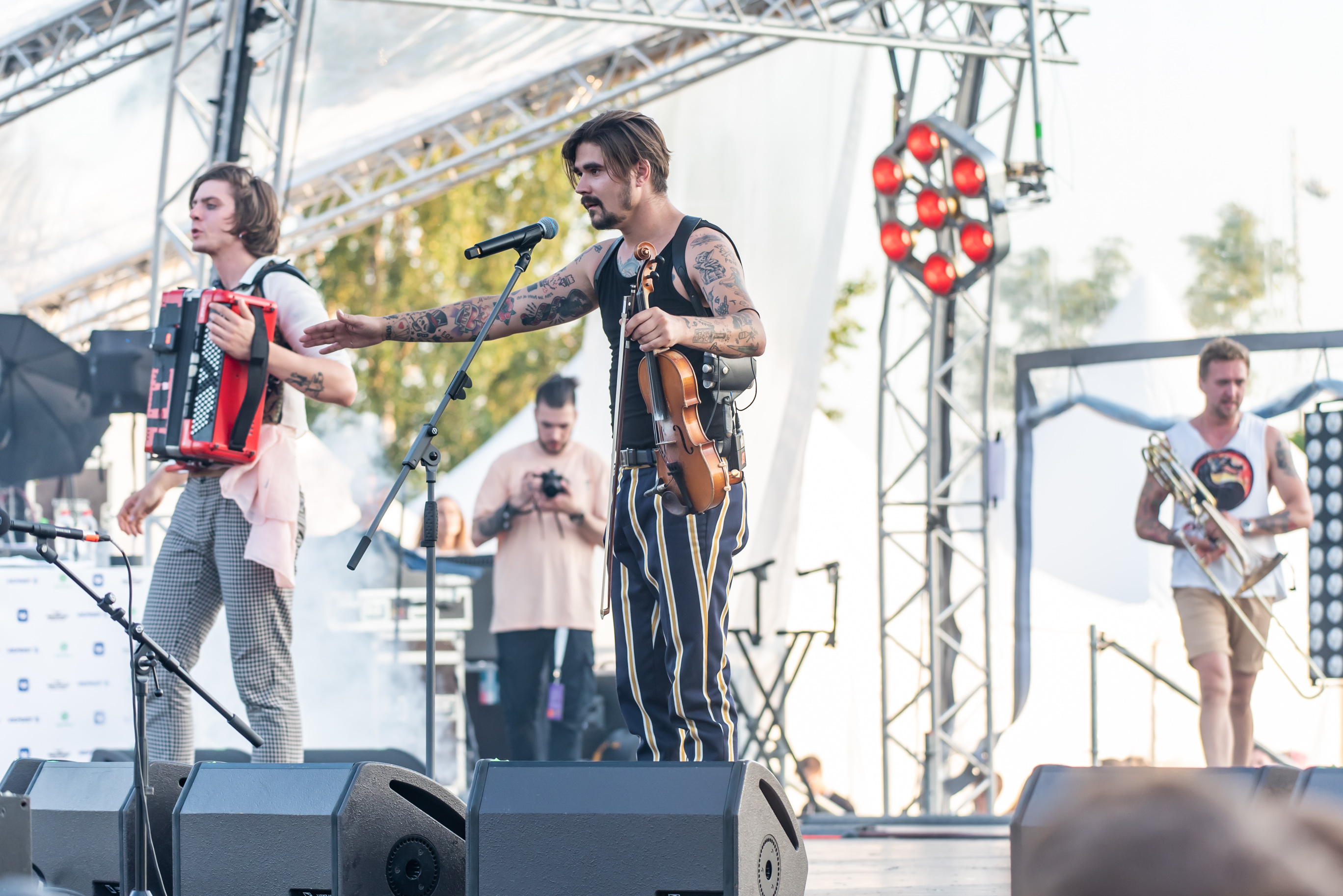
- The Hatters at VK Fest 5

Background information
- Origin: Saint Petersburg, Russia
- Genres: Folk punk, folk rock, ska, ska punk, romance
- Years active: 2016–present
- Members: Yuri Muzychenko; Pavel Lichadeev; Alexander "Kikir" Anisimov; Dmitry Vecherinin; Anna Muzychenko
- Past members: Anna Lichadeeva; Vadim Rulev; Altair Kozhakhmetov

The Hatters are a Russian gypsy-folk-rock band formed in 2016 in St. Petersburg. The members of the group are Yuri Yurievich Muzychenko, Pavel Lichadeev, Alexander "Kikir" Anisimov, Dmitry Vecherinin and Anna Muzychenko.

== History ==
The group was formed on February 23, 2016, by publishing their first song "Russian Style" on their YouTube channel. On 22 September 2016, the band published the video "I'm Not Easy Buddy" on their YouTube channel. On 17 September and 19 November of the same year, the band gave joint concerts with Little Big and Tatarka in large venues in St. Petersburg and Moscow. On 7 November, they performed with the Emir Kusturica and Goran Bregovich On 10 November 2016, the music video for "Russian Style" was published. On 28 December, the group released their first EP "Stay True". In February 2017, the band performed at Krestovsky Stadium as part of the Radio Zenit festival.

On 21 April 2017, the group released their first album "Full Hat". On 26 April, the group performed the song "I'm Not Easy Buddy" on the Russian TV channel "Channel One". On 30 October 2017, they presented a song from their new album "Forever Young, Forever Drunk". The album released on 1 December 2017.

Leader of the band Yuri Muzychenko, was the backing vocals in the Russian Eurovision 2020 song "UNO" by Little Big.

The album "Golden Hits" was released on 3 December 2021.

== Musical style ==
The band calls themself a "Russian-Gypsy street folk alcoholic hardcore on spiritual instruments".

== Band composition ==
=== Current composition ===
- Yuri – vocals, violin (since 2016)
- Pavel "Pash-Milash" Lichadeev – vocals, accordion (since 2016)
- Alexander "Kikir" Anisimov – bass (since 2016)
- Anna Muzychenko – backing vocals, percussion (since 2016)
- Dmitry "Milash 2.0" Vecherinin – drums (since 2016)
- Daniil Mustaev – Director (since 2016)

=== Former members ===
- Anna Lichadeeva (2016–2020) – backing vocals, percussion
- Vadim Rulev (2016–2020) – trombone
- Altair Kozhakhmetov (2018–2020) – trumpet

== Discography ==
=== Albums and EPs ===
Albums
Year	Name
2017	Полная шляпа
2017	"Forever Young, Forever Drunk"
2018	"No Comments" (Instrumental)
2019	"Forte & Piano"
2020	"Bathroom (Original Theater Play Soundtrack)"
2021	"Golden Hits"
2023	''По ходу люблю''

Extended Plays
Year	Name
2016	"Stay True"
2018	Три внутри
2020	"Shoot Me"
2021	Литера А (feat. рудбой)

Live Albums
Year	Name
2021	"V"

=== Singles ===
Singles
Year	Name
2016	"Russian Style"
2017	Зима
2017	Кайфмэн
2017	"FYFD (Forever Young, Forever Drunk)
2018	Наружу изнутри (Remastered)
2018	Разговор со счастьем (OST Год свиньи)
2019	Танцы
2019	Да, это про нас (Music Video Version)
2019	Всё сразу
2019	Дед Мороз не показывает слёз
2020	Последний герой
2020	На дальней станции сойду (OST Патриот)
2020	Я делаю шаг
2021	Под зонтом (feat. рудбой)
2021	Я ваще!
2021	"Bullet" (feat. MARUV)
2021	Двигай
2021	Мрачные Звоночки
2023	Выходи играть в снежки

=== Features ===
Album Contributions
Year	Name
2019	Гарри Топор — Визморианские хроники (Зверь, Мир не проснется)
2020	Гарри Топор — Los Muertos (Изумрудный город)
2021	MARUV – No Name ("Bullet")

== Videography ==
=== Music videos ===
Music Videos
Year	Name
2016	I'm Not Easy Buddy
2016	"Russian Style"
2017	Зима
2017	"Everyday I'm Drinking"
2018	"Forever Young Forever Drunk" (feat. Just Femi)
2018	Наружу изнутри
2018	"Halloween Bloody Party
2018	"No Rules"
2018	Разговор со счастьем (OST Год свиньи)
2019	Гарри Топор & The Hatters — Мир не проснётся
2019	Танцы
2019	Да, это про нас
2019	Всё сразу
2020	Последний Герой
2020	Я делаю шаг
2020	Только позови
2021	"Shoot Me"
2021	Я ваще!
2021	"Bullet" (feat. MARUV)
2021	Двигай
2021	Если бы
2022	Мрачные Звоночки
2022	НЕМНОГО ЖАЛЬ

=== Cameos in other music videos ===
Cameos
Year	Artist	Name
2013	Little Big	"Life in Da Trash"
2014	Little Big	"Public Enemy
2018	Little Big	"Skibidi"
2019	Little Big	"Skibidi" (Romantic Edition)
2019	Animal Jazz	Чувства
2019	Little Big	"I'm OK"
2020	Little Big	"UNO"
2020	Little Big	"Hypnodancer"
2020	Little Big	"Suck My Dick 2020"
2021	Little Big	"A Lot of Money"

== Awards and nominations ==
Year	Prize	Nomination	Result	East.
2020	Премия OK (OK Award)	Новые лица. Музыка (New faces. Music)	Nomination	
2021	MTV Музыкант года 2021	Artist of the year	Win	
