= Dmitry Krasilov =

Russian artist (1994–2023)

- Дмитрий Красилов
- Born: 22 June 1994; Zarinsk, Altai Krai, Russia
- Died: 18 December 2023 (aged 29); Moscow, Russia
- Citizenship: Russia

Dmitry Krasilov (Russian: Дмитрий Красилов, 22 June 1994 – 18 December 2023), best known by his stage name Pukhlyash (Russian: Пухляш), was a Russian showman, dancer and actor. He became widely known in 2020 after starring in the music video for the Little Big song "Uno". He also starred in the video for the song "Crying on Techno" (Russian: Плачу на техно) by the bands Cream Soda and Khleb.

== Biography ==
Krasilov was born on 22 June 1994, in Zarinsk, Altai Krai. He learned to dance at the age of 8. In 2020, he graduated from the Faculty of Social, Cultural and Information Technologies of the Altai State Institute of Culture.

Krasilov became widely known after starring in the music video for Little Big song "UNO" for the Eurovision Song Contest 2020 – the band was supposed to represent Russia at this song contest, but it was cancelled due to the COVID-19 pandemic. Also, together with the band Khleb, he starred in the Cream Soda video for the song "Crying on Techno". He got nominated for inclusion in the ranking of "30 most promising Russians under 30" in the "Art" category for 2020 according to the Russian Forbes magazine.

== Death ==
Krasilov died in Moscow on 18 December 2023, at the age of 29. The showman's director, after unsuccessful attempts to get through, came to Dmitry Krasilov's apartment, who did not open the door for him. The rescuers who arrived to the call opened the door and found him dead. The cause of his death was endocrinopathy.

Krasilov was buried in his homeland – in the city of Zarinsk, Altai Krai.
