= Sonya Tayurskaya =

Russian singer (born 1991)

Sonya Tayurskaya Со́фья Таю́рская
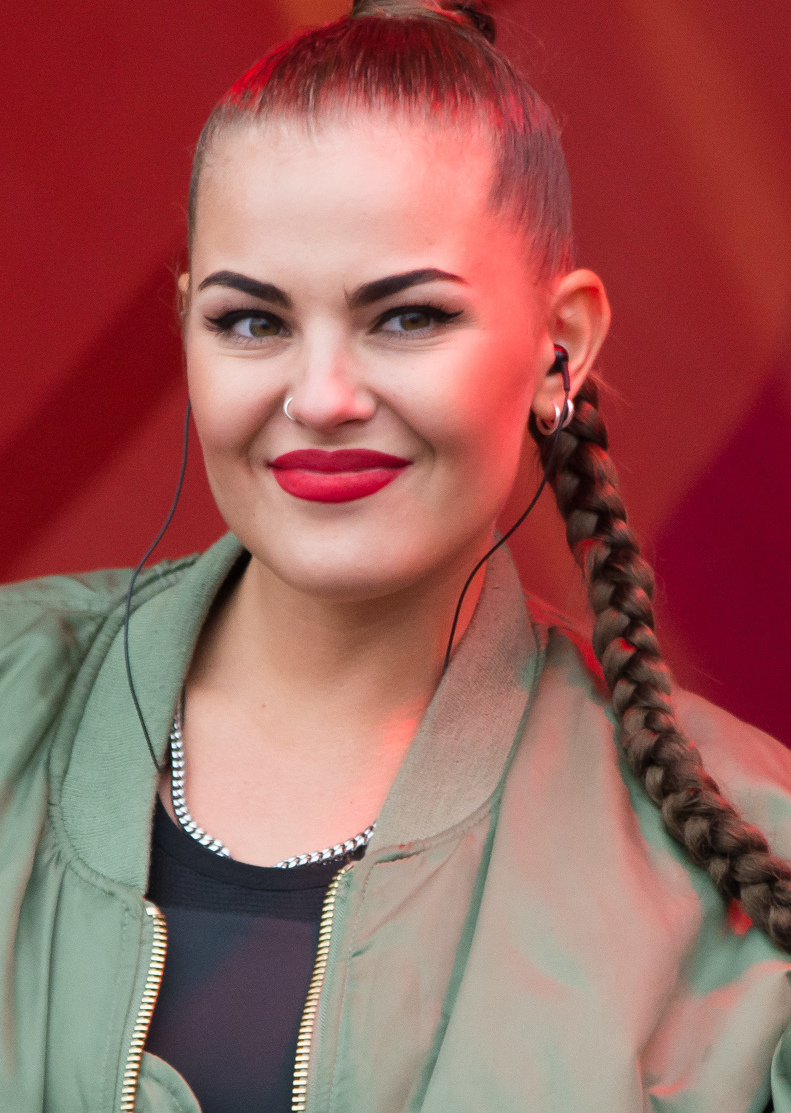
- Tayurskaya at Vidfest 2016 in St. Petersburg

Background information
- Born: 1 May 1991 (age 35); Irkutsk, RSFSR, USSR
- Genres: Rave; punk-pop; rap-rave
- Occupation: Singer
- Years active: 2014–present
- Member of: Little Big
- Spouse: Ilya Prusikin (m. 2022)

Sofiya Alekseevna Tayurskaya (Russian: Со́фья Алексе́евна Таю́рская; born 1 May 1991, Irkutsk, RSFSR, USSR) is a Russian vocalist for the punk-rave group Little Big.

== Biography ==
Tayurskaya was born on 1 May 1991 in Irkutsk, but she and her family moved to Novodvinsk (in Arkhangelsk Oblast).

After she finished school in Novodvinsk she moved to Saint Petersburg, where she attended Saint Petersburg State Institute of Culture majoring in directing mass theatrical productions. During her studies, she worked part time and performed in bars, cafes and karaoke. In 2012, she received a diploma and decided to stay in Saint Petersburg.

=== Career ===
Since 2014, Tayurskaya has been a songwriter for the rave group Little Big. She also made her first appearance with the group as the same time with the video "With Russia from Love". Since 2016 she has participated with the group in concerts.

In 2022, the main members of Little Big (Ilya Prusikin, Tayurskaya, director Alina Pyazok) moved to Los Angeles in the United States and opposed the Russian invasion of Ukraine.

=== Personal life ===
Since August 2020, she has been in a relationship with Prusikin. In May 2024, the couple announced that they were expecting a child and shared pictures with their daughter in November 2024.
