= Antipositive, Pt. 2 =

Studio album by Little Big
- Released: 5 October 2018
- Genre: Rave; pop; new rave; happy hardcore; EDM; electro house; bass house
- Length: 22:06
- Language: English, Russian, French
- Label: Little Big Family, Warner Music Russia

Little Big chronology
Antipositive, Pt. 1 (2018)	Antipositive, Pt. 2 (2018)	Live in St. Petersburg (2019)

Singles from Antipositive, Pt. 2
- 1. "Skibidi" Released: 22 February 2019

Antipositive, Pt. 2 is the fourth studio album by the Russian punk-rave group Little Big. The album was released on 5 October 2018.

== Background ==
On 5 October 2018, the group released the album, along with an adaptation of the new track "Skibidi".

The album consists of seven tracks, among which for the first time, a French song called "Mon Ami". The group performed the chorus of the song earlier, long before the release of the album, at their concert in France.

On 22 February 2019, the band released a remix album Skibidi, which included five tracks.

== Reception ==
Boris Barabanov called the "Skibidi" track a repeat of the success of "Gangnam Style", and the album as a whole a milestone on the way of the group's transformation from the domestic Die Antwoord into the electronic Leningrad. At the same time, he noted that, compared to previous releases, Little Big's songs have become less 'cheerful fool' (often repulsive) and they now meet the standards of various musical styles.

== Track listing ==
No.	Title	Length
1.	"Liar"	3:03
2.	"Skibidi"	2:43
3.	"Follow Me" (featuring Tommy Cash)	3:57
4.	"Real People"	3:25
5.	"Liar" (Sibrinin Remix)	2:45
6.	"Mon Ami"	2:51
7.	"Little Boy (Thank You Mom)"	3:22
Total length:		22:06

== Personnel ==
- Lyrics / vocals – Ilyich (Ilya Prusikin), Just Femi, Sonya Tayurskaya, Mr. Clown (Anton Lissov), Tommy Cash
- Music – Ilyich (Ilya Prusikin), Lubim (Lubim Khomchuk), Viktor Sibrinin
- Cover – Maxim Semenov
