= Irina Smelaya =

Hip-hop artist from Tatarstan, Russia

Irina Aleksandrovna Smelaya Ири́на Алекса́ндровна Сме́лая
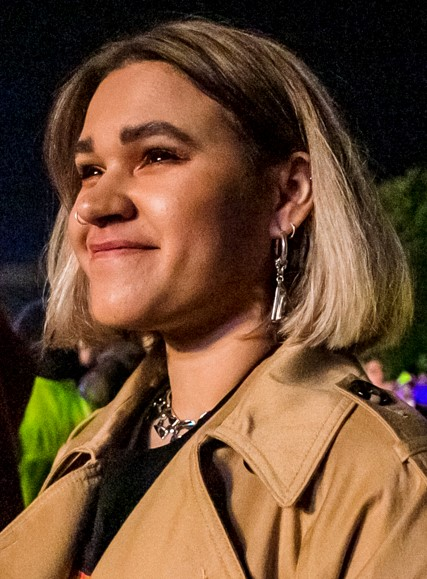
- Smelaya in 2019

Background information
- Also known as: Tatarka
- Born: 21 December 1991 (age 34); Naberezhnye Chelny, Tatarstan, Russian SFSR, Soviet Union
- Origin: Saint Petersburg, Russia
- Genre: Cloud rap
- Occupations: Vlogger; singer
- Years active: 2015–present
- Label: Little Big Family
- Spouse: Ilya Prusikin (m. 2016; div. 2020)

Irina Aleksandrovna Smelaya (Russian: Ири́на Алекса́ндровна Сме́лая; born 21 December 1991), better known by her stage name Tatarka (Russian: Татарка, lit. 'Tatar woman'), is a female hip-hop artist from Tatarstan, Russia. Her songs are written in Tatar and English.

== Music and vlogging ==
Smelaya was born in Naberezhnye Chelny. She currently lives in St. Petersburg and is a vlogger and hip-hop artist. Her YouTube blog named "Tatar Days" (Татарские будни, Tatarskiye budni) has almost a million subscribers.

"Altyn" ("gold" in Tatar) was her first song, which was released in 2016 and earned her recognition in the Russian music scene.

Smelaya released her debut album, Golden Flower, in October 2020.

== Personal life ==
Smelaya married Ilya Prusikin, the vocalist and frontman of the Russian pop-rave-band Little Big, on 6 July 2016.

She gave birth to her and Prusikin's son Dobrynya on 26 November 2017.

Smelaya and Prusikin publicly announced their separation on 21 August 2020.

== Discography ==
Albums

| Name | Information |
|---|---|
| Golden Flower | Release: 29 October 2020 Label: Warner Music Russia Format: Digital distribution |

Expanded Plays

| Name | Information |
|---|---|
| Demo Life | Release: 5 July 2024 Label: self-released Format: Digital distribution |

Singles

| Year | Name | Album |
|---|---|---|
| 2016 | Altyn | Non-album single |
| 2017 | U Can Take (feat. Little Big) | Non-album single |
| 2017 | Pussy Power | Non-album single |
| 2019 | AU | Non-album single |
| 2019 | Arriba (feat. Little Big & Clean Bandit) | Non-album single |
| 2020 | Vroom | Golden Flower |
| 2020 | Bubblegum | Golden Flower |
| 2021 | Kawaii | Golden Flower |
| 2021 | Loli Boy (feat. Cream Soda) | Non-album single |
| 2022 | Feel My Vibe | Non-album single |
| 2022 | Black Dress | Non-album single |
| 2022 | Туган як | Non-album single |
| 2023 | Dance with Me | Non-album single |
| 2024 | Dumb | Non-album single |
| 2024 | Матур кызлар | Non-album single |

== Video Clips ==
| Title | Year | Notes |
|---|---|---|
| Altyn (Gold) | 2016 | At the end of 2016, Tatarka released her debut video for the song "Altyn", in which the singer dances in front of cars, wearing the clothes of the popular designer Gosha Rubchinsky. During the first week of its release, the video gathered over 3 million views, and was included in Afisha's "100 great clips of the year" of 2016. The genre of the song can be described as cloud-rap, as well as being primarily in Tatar language. The music video promoted Samsung's new phone at the time – the Galaxy S7 Edge, and the music video itself was shot completely with this phone. |
| U Can Take (feat. Little Big) | 2017 | This song marks Tatarka's first collaboration with other music artists. The song is also written in Tatar, with the part of Ilya Prusikin, Irina's husband, being performed in English. The clip "U Can Take" was filmed in Thailand, while the artists were on vacation. On its first day of release, the video collected more than 2 million views. |
| Pussy Power | 2017 | After recognizing her popularity among the foreign audience, Tatarka produced this song completely in English language. Tatarka has assured that her album will be in both English and Tatar language. Evident in the song's lyrics and music video's theme, Pussy Power presents a strong pro-feminist commentary. |
| Au | 2019 | This song recorded in Tatar language. The clip was filmed in Uzbekistan, in Tashkent, Khiva, Chirchik and other cities. |
| Kawaii | 2020 | From Golden Flower album. |
| Boys & Girls (mood video) | 2021 | From Golden Flower album |
| LOLI BOY | 2021 | Non-album single |

=== Participations ===
- 2014 – Little Big – "Public Enemy"
- 2016 – Little Big – "Big Dick"
- 2016 – Little Big – "Hateful Love"
- 2018 – Bread – "Shashlyndos"
- 2019 – Animal Jazz – "Feelings"

== See also ==
- Little Big (band)
- Ilya Prusikin
- The Hatters
