= Go Bananas =

EP by Little Big
- Released: 14 November 2019
- Genre: Dance-pop, electro-house
- Length: 15:01
- Label: Little Big Family, Warner Music Russia
- Producer: Anton Muntyan, Denis Zuckerman, Ilya Prusikin, Victor Sibrinin

Little Big chronology
| Live in St. Petersburg (2019) | Go Bananas (2019) | Covers (2021) |

Singles from Go Bananas
- 1. "Rock-Paper-Scissors" Released: 25 October 2019

Go Bananas (stylized in all caps) is an EP by the Russian punk-rave group Little Big. The album was released on November 14, 2019.

== Reception ==
Professional ratings
Review scores
| Source | Rating |
|---|---|
| InterMedia | 6/10 |

Danila Golovkin of InterMedia gave the mini-album a 6 out of 10, describing the project as "an endless repetition of ourselves." Golovkin compared the title track to a "prosaic club hit with a primitive arrangement and an endless chorus ... a mixture of the national tradition of popular music of the 90s with last year's rap to a straight kick".

== Music video ==
The music video for the song "Go Bananas" was released the next day on 15 November on YouTube. The video got its first million views in 6 hours, two million views in 10 hours, and by the first day, over 3.3 million views. The video demonstrates various actions turned upside down, including: toilet relieves itself one of the members of the group (Anton Lissov), Ilya Prusikin bursts a balloon, but bursts himself instead, fish are shocked that people cannot breathe outside the water and a pigeon feeds people with bread etc.

Danila Golovkin from InterMedia called the video mediocre than the song itself, in which the group collected their old techniques from previous music videos.

== Track listing ==
=== Go Bananas ===
| No. | Title | Length |
|---|---|---|
| 1. | "Pop On The Top" | 3:15 |
| 2. | "Rock-Paper-Scissors" | 2:44 |
| 3. | "Go Bananas" | 2:42 |
| 4. | "TITS" | 3:14 |
| 5. | "Emotions (Requiem For Freedom)" | 3:06 |
| Total length: | | 15:01 |
