= Uno (Little Big song) =

2020 single by Little Big

Single by Little Big
- Released: 13 March 2020
- Genre: Electropop
- Length: 2:40
- Label: Little Big Family; Warner Music Russia
- Songwriters: Denis Tsukerman; Ilya Prusikin; Viktor Sibrinin
- Producer: Little Big

Little Big singles chronology
"Rock-Paper-Scissors" (2019)	"Uno" (2020)	"Hypnodancer" (2020)

Music video
- "Uno" on YouTube

Eurovision Song Contest 2020 entry
- Country: Russia
- Artist: Little Big
- Languages: English, Spanish
- Composers: Denis Tsukerman; Ilya Prusikin; Viktor Sibrinin
- Lyricists: Denis Tsukerman; Ilya Prusikin

Finals performance
- Semi-final result: Contest cancelled

Entry chronology
- ◄ "Scream" (2019)
- "Russian Woman" (2021) ►

"Uno" (stylized in all caps; Spanish for "one") is a Spanglish song recorded by Russian rave group Little Big. It was selected to represent Russia in the Eurovision Song Contest 2020 before its cancellation. The song was released as a digital download and for streaming on 13 March 2020. In the chorus, the line "Uno, dos, cuatro" (transl. One, two, four) is repeated constantly, which was identified by media as a joke reference to the middle finger. The music video was released on March 12. It went viral, reaching 11 million views in a day. Within two months, the music video amassed 100 million views, beating the record of Netta's "Toy" as the most-viewed video in the Eurovision YouTube channel. Critics had mixed reactions to the song. The song was added to Just Dance 2021.

== Background and composition ==
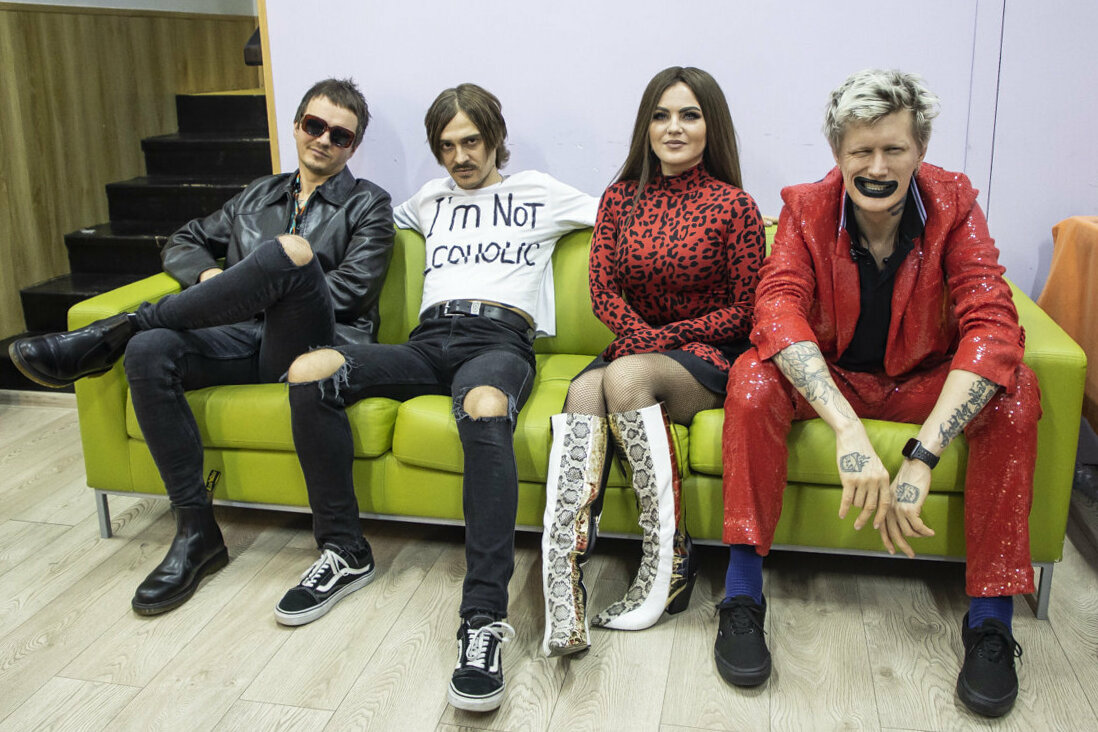
Little Big in Kaliningrad in 2019

Russian rave group Little Big had their debut performance, performing as an opening for hip-hop group Die Antwoord on 2 July 2013. The group's first album, With Russia From Love, was released on 18 July 2014. In 2016, the group released their second album, named Funeral Rave; the name was inspired by their music style. That same year, they released their song "Big Dick" and released the song "Skibidi" two years later, which started a "Macarena-like" internet challenge dubbed the "#SkibidiChallenge".

The concept of the Uno was made during the group's holiday in Los Angeles in January 2020. When they returned back to Saint Petersburg, they wrote the lyrics and recorded the vocals. Within a few days, the song was officially created. According to the band members, the song was not originally intended for Eurovision but for another album. They sent an application for the Eurovision Song Contest 2020 "just for fun" but were "surprised" when they were selected. The song is Spanglish; an example of this would be that in the chorus: the line "Uno, dos, quatro" (transl. One, two, four) is repeated constantly. Various media websites interpreted the counting as a reference to the middle finger joke. The lyrics talk about a certain girl calling on the lyrical "hero" to be with her for the night, but the "hero" ignores the comment. According to Ilya Prusikin, a member of the band, the song is similar to "rock disco" or "metal disco". Sait so smyslom also said that the song contained a charming style presumably from the 70s.

== Music video ==
Because the song was not prepared for the contest, they only had five days to record the music video. Prusikin likened the creation of the music video to "hell". The music video appeared in the evening program "Evening Urgant" on 12 March. According to Eurovision fan site Wiwibloggs, the music video contained goofy dancing, an "iconic" kung-fu dancer (Dmitry Krasilov), and flared trousers. The video was full of in-joke cultural references to the history of TV performances of the ballet dancer Maya Plisetskaya.

== Eurovision Song Contest ==
The song was Russia's entry in the Eurovision Song Contest 2020 after Little Big had been internally selected by the Russian broadcaster, Channel One. For feedback, they sent their song to Russian pop singer Philipp Kirkorov, who worked with numerous Russian representatives in Eurovision. The song would have been performed in one of the two semi-final rounds. On 28 January 2020, a special allocation draw was held, which placed each country into one of the two semi-finals. Russia was placed in the first semi-final, which was to be held on 12 May 2020, and was scheduled to perform in the first half of the show. However, Eurovision Song Contest 2020 was cancelled due to the COVID-19 pandemic.

== Reception and viral success ==
Music critic Artur Gasparyan from TASS said the song was "noticeable," but unlikely to win. When the song went viral, internet users supported the song, describing it as catchy. Journalist Boris Barabanov from Kommersant described the song as a "toy-turbo Latin" that is impossible to forget. Barabanov also described the song close to the "domestic pop" of the early 1990s, similar to the Car-Man group. According to a journalist from a music website, the song is "fresh" and "fun", with the journalist comparing it to Danish band Aqua. Music critic Yana Rudovskaya from TASS stated that the song was still good but was inferior to the band's previous hits. Another critic did not support the song, stating that the "only thing" present is the "fat dancer" in the music video. The critic also described the song as a parody of the country's previous Eurovision hits. In the first 10 hours of release, it gained 1.3 million views. Within the first 16 hours of release, the song already amassed 4 million views. In one day, the song gained 11 million views, trending in 16 Eurovision countries. The song sparked the "#UnoVisionChallenge" on TikTok, causing the song to gain 250 million views on the platform. The song also reached 100 million views within two months, beating Netta Barzilai's record with "Toy" from Eurovision 2018 which reached 100 million views in nine months in the Eurovision YouTube Channel. By July 20, the song became the most-viewed video on the YouTube channel of Eurovision with 134 million views. The song was added to Just Dance 2021.

== Charts ==
=== Weekly charts ===
Weekly chart performance for "Uno"
Chart (2020)	Peak position
CIS Airplay (TopHit)	7
Estonia (Eesti Tipp-40)	9
Hungary (Single Top 40)	21
Lithuania (AGATA)	33
Russia Airplay (TopHit)	4
Scotland Singles (OCC)	97
Ukraine Airplay (TopHit)	173
UK Singles Sales (OCC)	81

=== Monthly charts ===
Monthly chart performance for "Uno"
Chart (2020)	Peak position
CIS Airplay (TopHit)	8
Russia Airplay (TopHit)	8

=== Year-end charts ===
Year-end chart performance for "Uno"
Chart (2020)	Position
CIS Airplay (TopHit)	34
Russia Airplay (TopHit)	48

== Release history ==
Region	Date	Format	Label	Ref.
Various	13 March 2020	Digital download, streaming	Little Big Family	
