= Saint Petersburg State Institute of Culture =

University in Saint Petersburg, Russia

Coordinates: 59.9462°N 30.3313°E

- Санкт-Петербургский государственный институт культуры
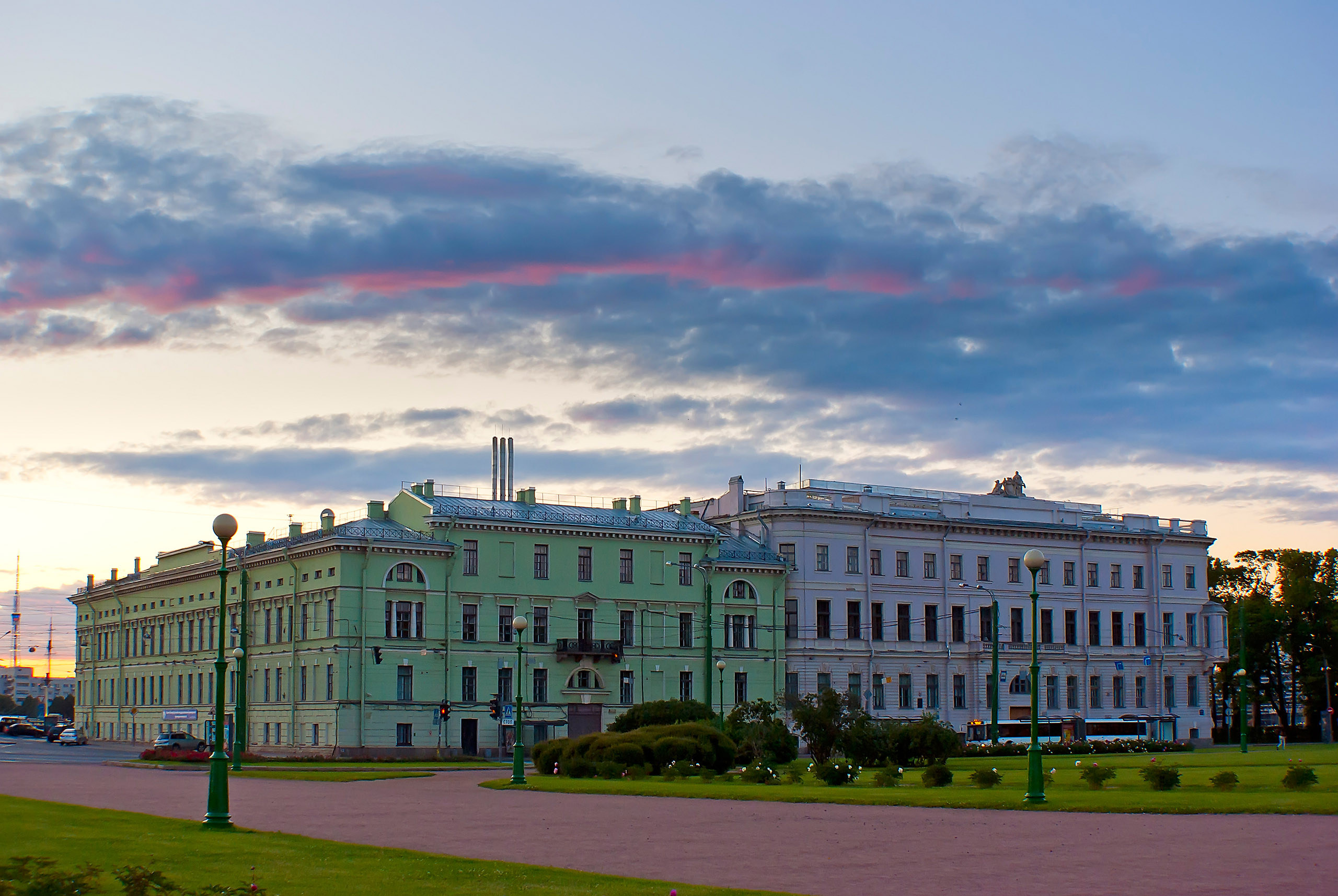
- Established: 1918
- Rector: Alexander Turgaev
- Students: 8,000
- Postgraduates: 600
- Location: Palace Embankment 2, Saint Petersburg, Russia
- Website: http://www.spbgik.ru

Saint Petersburg State Institute of Culture (Russian: Санкт-Петербургский государственный институт культуры) is a university in Saint Petersburg, a preparation and further training centre for specialists in the field of culture and arts.

== Curriculum ==
=== Bachelor's programme ===
- Library and information activity
- Social and cultural activity
- Psychology
- Tourism
- Musical and instrumental art
- Conducting
- Folk art
- Folk singing
- Production of theatre performances and festivals
- Musicology and applied musical art
- Art of Entertaining music
- Museology and protection of cultural and natural inheritance objects
- Culturology
- Sociology
- Linguistics
- History of arts
- Restoration
- Design

=== Master's programme ===
- Library and cultural activity
- Social and cultural activity
- Psychology
- Tourism
- Musical and instrumental art
- Conducting
- Folk singing
- Production of theatre performances and festivals
- Art of singing
- Musicology and applied musical art
- Museology and protection of cultural and natural inheritance objects
- Culturology
- History of arts
- Applied information science
- Management
- State and municipal administration
- HR management
- Hotel business
- Design

=== Specialist's programme ===
- TV and cinema production
- Acting technique

=== Post-graduate course ===
- Library science, bibliography science and book science
- Information systems and processes
- History of philosophy
- Theory and principles of training and education (music)
- Theory, principles and organization of social and cultural activity
- Theory and history of arts
- Sociology of culture
- Theory and history of culture
- Museum science, conservation and restoration of historical and cultural objects
