= Evening Urgant =

Russian late-night talk show

- Also known as: Urgant Show
- Created by: Ivan Urgant
- Written by: Denis Rtischev; Konstantin Anisimov; Pavel Vinogradov; Alexander Gudkov; Dmitry Emelyanenkov; Roman Kim; Vladimir Makov; Garik Oganisyan; Vyacheslav Omutov; Dmitry Pepelyaev; Pavel Prokopyev; Vadim Seleznyov; Mikhail Semichev; Ivan Urgant; Denis Khoreshko; Andrey Shavkero; Grigory Shatokhin
- Directed by: Roman Butovsky; Alex Boltenko
- Presented by: Ivan Urgant
- Starring: Ivan Urgant; Alexander Gudkov; Dmitry Khrustalev
- Narrated by: Alexander Gudkov; Dmitry Khrustalev
- Opening theme: "Evening Urgant"
- Country of origin: Russia
- Original language: Russian
- No. of seasons: 10
- No. of episodes: 1603

Production
- Executive producer: Dmitry Koshkin
- Producers: Ivan Urgant; Andrey Boltenko; Alexander Fayfman; Konstantin Ernst
- Production locations: Ostankino, Moscow
- Running time: 30-50 minutes

Original release
- Network: Channel One
- Release: 16 April 2012 – 21 February 2022 (suspended, allegedly)

Evening Urgant (Russian: Вечерний Ургант, romanized: Vecherniy Urgant) is a Russian late-night talk show hosted by Ivan Urgant on Channel One, a show based on similarly styled American late-night shows. The first episode aired on 16 April 2012. Ivan Urgant has said that he received advice from western television producers, and cites Jimmy Fallon and David Letterman as inspirations.

According to several sources, the show was suspended in February 2022 after Urgant expressed his opposition to the 2022 Russian invasion of Ukraine, while Channel One claimed that there was just a scheduling issue.

== Format and structure ==
Each episode begins with a cold opening, featuring jokes usually associated with the guests of the night. This is followed by the premiere of "credit sequence" with a series of night shots of Moscow, the street which is Urgant. Back in the Studio, Urgant delivers an introductory monologue containing jokes about current events, pop culture or politics. After the monologue, the show may show one or more Comedy parodies or recurring segments, after which Urgant brings out the famous guests of that evening for a one-on-one interview. The final segment of the show features a live performance from a musical guest.

The main focus of the show is on the portion containing celebrity interviews. The show's house band is The Fruits (Russian: Фрукты, romanized: Frukty), hailing from Saint Petersburg.

== Filming and airing ==
The show is taped in front of a live audience at 4:30 pm MSK on the day the episode is due to be aired. Some interviews may be recorded days in advance, depending on the availability of the guest. Anyone over 16 years old can fill out an application on the show's website to be a member of the studio audience.

== See also ==
- Prozhektorperiskhilton
- Ciao, 2020!
