= Yuri Muzychenko =

Russian musician (born 1987)

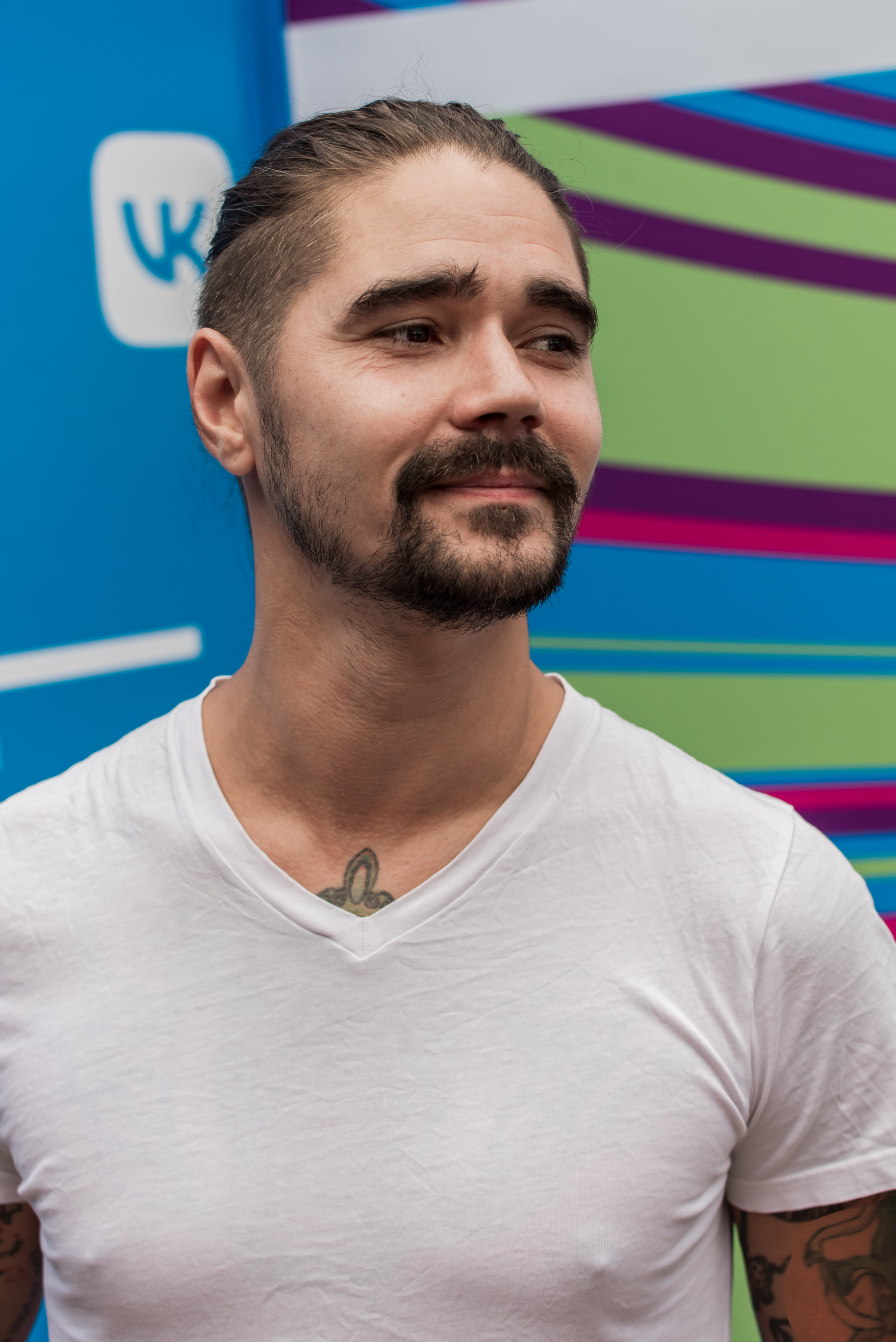
- Muzychenko at VK Fest 2022
- Born: Yuri Yurievich Muzychenko; July 8, 1987 (age 39); Gatchina, Leningrad, Russian SFSR, Soviet Union
- Known for: The Hatters

Yuri Yurievich Muzychenko (born July 8, 1987) is a Russian musician and video blogger, frontman and one of the founders of the folk-rock group 'The Hatters'.

From 12 to 16 May 2020, Muzychenko was supposed to represent Russia, alongside the group 'Little Big' at the 65th Eurovision Song Contest in Rotterdam, Netherlands. However, the contest was cancelled.

== Biography ==
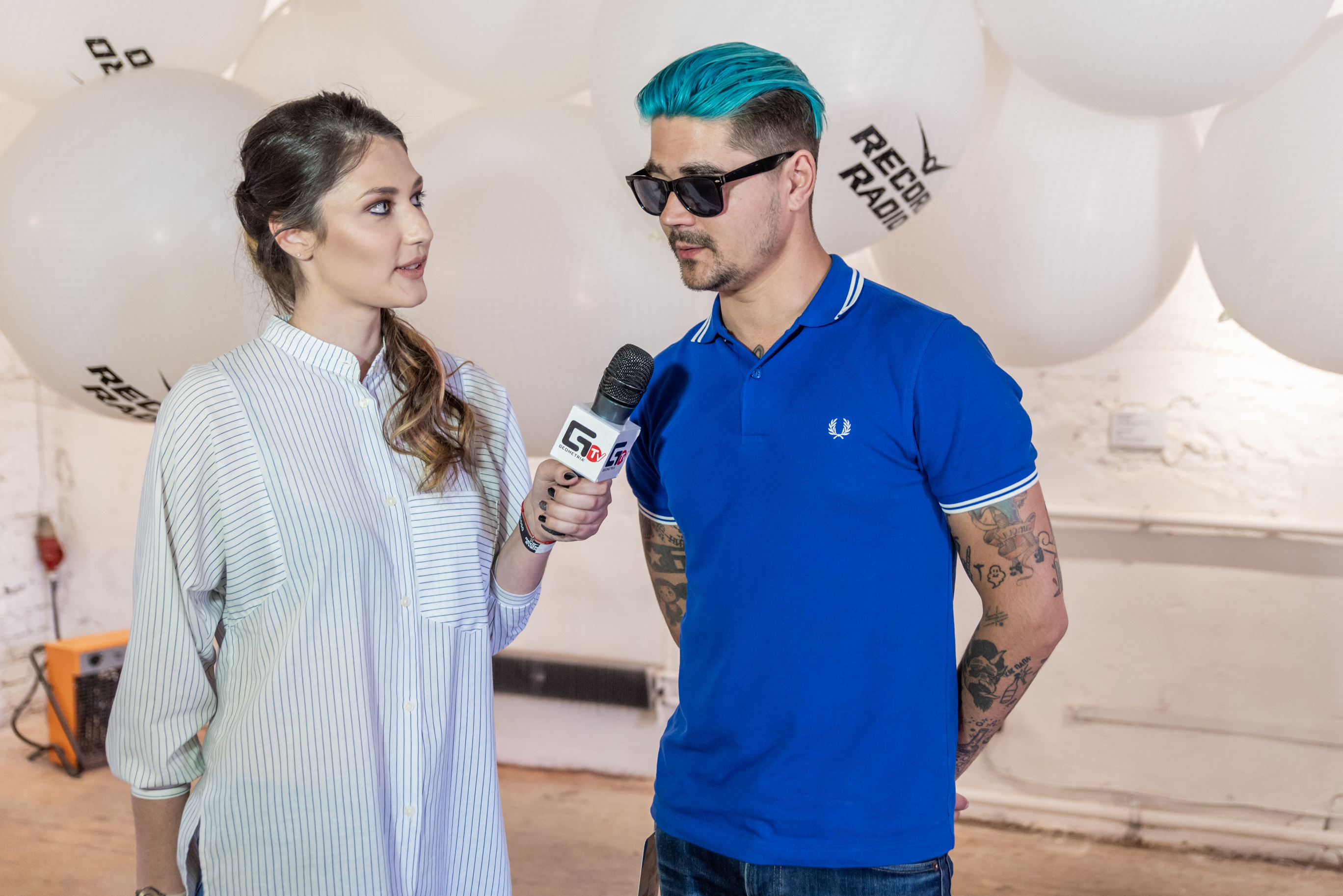
Muzychenko at Vidfest 2018

Muzychenko was born on July 8, 1987, in Gatchina. He was the youngest child in his family, while his brothers and sisters were athletes, he was the only musician. Upon administration to the Russian State Institute of Performing Arts (formerly SPbGATI), a situation occurred and it led him to the Litsedei. Muzychenko liked the behaviour and atmosphere of the Litsedeevs and he said that 'They are real rock and roll players'.

He was the hero of the special issue of 'New Russia' of the show 'VDud'.

He performed three times as part of The Hatters group in the Evening Urgant program, and also 2 times he was invited as a guest. The first time as a member of the YouTube group 'KLIKKLAK', and the second time separately.

=== Creation ===
On June 15, 2013, on the channel 'Let's Laima' released a pilot episode of 'Community Expert', in total, 6 videos were released. On 6 May 2015, on the channel 'A thousand devils, what a tattoo!' the last video was released.

On the same channel, Muzychenko hosted the show 'A THOUSAND OF DEARS WHAT A TATTOO HISTORY', there were also shows: 'Problem', 'Sketches from Liza' and 'WILL GO I WILL ASK' with participation of Anna Sergovna.

In February 2016, he joined the KLIKKLAK team, starring in the second edition of the TRASH LOTTO show together with Eldar Dzharakhov, Ilya Prusikin and Ivan Evstigneev.

On 25 June 2014, the music video of 'Public Enemy' by Little Big was released, where Muzychenko and his family performed a cameo, playing their characters from the Litsedeev play. He also cameoed in the music videos for 'Life in da trash', and the series 'AMERICAN RUSSIANS: Just Do It'.

=== Musical career ===
The first group Muzychenko was a part of was BKMSB, which released one full album and two EPs. The group has now disbanded.

The Hatters was formed on 23 February 2016, having published their first song 'Russian Style'. On 22 September 2016, partnered with the 'Samsung YouTube TV' project, the music video for "I'm Not Easy Buddy" was released. On 10 November 2016, the music video for the song 'Russian Style' was published. On 28 December 2016, the group released their first EP 'Stay True'.

On 22 February 2017, The Hatters performed on the stage of the Krestovsky Stadium as part of the Radio Zenit festival.

The Hatters released their debut folk-punk album 'Full Hat' on 21 April 2017.

On 30 October 2017, the band released the title track for their second album 'Forever Young, Forever Drunk'. The album released on 1 December 2017.

On 20 July 2018, the band released their album 'No Comments', consisting of the instrumentals of all previously released songs.

On 13 November 2018, the band released the EP 'Three Inside'. On 2 July 2019, the album 'Forte & Piano' and the music video for the song 'Dances' was released. On 23 September of the same year, the video for 'Yes, this is about us' was released. On 30 October, the video for "EVERYTHING AT ONCE' released. On 31 December, the lyric video for 'Santa Claus does not show tears' was released.

In 2020, the group's song 'The Last Hero' became the soundtrack for the new season of the reality show 'The Last Hero' on TV-3.

On 13 November 2020, the EP 'Shoot Me' was released, and shortly before, the video for the song "I Make a Step' from the same EP was released.

== Personal life ==
On 4 September 2009, he married Anna Nikitina. On 26 November 2010, their daughter Elizabeth was born.
