= Cream Soda (band) =

Russian band

- Origin: Russia
- Genres: Synth-pop, disco, electro house, Hyperpop
- Years active: 2012–present
- Labels: Rhythm Park Records; Electoronica Records; Warner Music Group; S&P Digital
- Members: Ilya Gadaev; Alisa Styazhkova (aka AFELIA)
- Past members: Anna Romanovskaya; Dmitry Nova

Cream Soda is a Russian electronic music group that was founded in 2012 by Dmitry Nova and Ilya Gadaev, who collaborated on a series of Drum and Bass and Dubstep productions after meeting online.

Looking to explore a more musical and melodic sound, Nova and Gadaev began working with vocalists, including Anna Romanovskaya, who eventually became Cream Soda’s frontwoman until 2021. With the third member, Anna Romanovskaya, the group recorded their main hits "No More Parties", "Crying at Techno" and several others.

Since 2022, Romanovskaya's place in the group has been taken by Alisa Styazhkova.

On 20 March 2023, the group's founder, Dmitry Nova, was found drowned in the Volga river at the age of 34. He, his brother Roman, and two acquaintances had attempted to cross the frozen Volga River on foot, but the ice was unable to support the group's weight.

== Discography ==
=== Studio albums ===
Name	Information
Пожар "Fire"	Release date: 28 March 2016; Label: Electronica Records; Format: Digital Distribution
Красиво "Beautiful"	Release date: 30 March 2018; Label: Not On Label; Format: Digital Distribution
Версии красиво "Beautiful Remixes"	Release date: 19 October 2018; Label: Masterskaya; Format: Digital Distribution
Комета "Comet"	Release date: 12 July 2019; Label: Warner Music Russia; Format: Digital Distribution
Интергалактик "Intergalactic"	Release date: 29 July 2020; Label: Warner Music Russia; Format: Digital Distribution
Йай	Release date: 2021; Label: Warner Music Russia; Format: Digital Distribution, Vinyl Record
Internet Friends	Release date: 26 May 2023; Label: S&P Digital; Format: Digital Distribution
Истерика	Release date: 24 April 2026; Label: S&P Digital; Format: Digital Distribution

=== Remix albums ===
Name	Information
Volga	Release date: 23 June 2017; Label: Rhythm Park Records; Format: Digital Distribution
Никаких больше вечеринок (Red Max Remix)	Release date: 14 October 2019; Label: Warner Music Russia; Format: Digital Distribution
Версии красиво	Release date: 19 October 2019; Label: Warner Music Russia; Format: Digital Distribution
King Cobras (maxi singles)	Release date: 28 September 2021; Label: Warner Music Russia; Format: Digital Distribution
Loli Boy (with Tatarka)	Release date: 18 November 2021; Label: Warner Music Russia; Format: Digital Distribution
Радуга (макси синглы)	Release date: 25 November 2021; Label: Warner Music Russia; Format: Digital Distribution

=== Singles ===
Интергалактик
Review scores
Source	Rating
InterMedia	7.5/10

Year	Name	Charts		
Year	Name	RU		
Year	Name	TopHit Top Radio and YouTube Hits	TopHit Top Radio Hits	TopHit Top YouTube hits
2013	"Feeling Free" (Cape Cod & Cream Soda)	-	-	-
2014	"Love Sex Sex"	-	-	-
2015	"Alive" (Cream Soda & Valery Rousseau)	-	-	-
2016	"Плен" (Cream Soda & Mana Island)	-	-	-
2017	"Небеса" (Antokha MC, Cream Soda & Лауд)	-	-	-
2018	"Prime Time" (Cream Soda & Лауд)	-	-	-
2018	"Любовник" (Cream Soda & Лауд)	-	-	-
2018	"Горячая линия" (Cream Soda & Лауд)	-	-	-
2019	"Никаких больше вечеринок"	51	46	-
2019	"Никаких больше вечеринок" (Smash Remix)	-	-	-
2020	"Плачу на техно" (Radio Edit) (Cream Soda & Хлеб)	5	12	6
2020	"Сердце лёд"	81	98	18
2021	"Атомы"	981	612	-
2021	"Аквадискотека" (Cream Soda & Александр Гудков)	-	-	-
2021	"Меланхолия"	-	-	-
2021	"Розовый фламинго" (Cream Soda & Алёна Свиридова)	-	-	-
2021	"Подожгу"	-	-	-
2021	"Год тигра" (Cream Soda & Казускома)	-	-	-

== Music videos ==
Year	Music Video	Director	Album
2017	"Volga"	Oleg Tomakov	Volga
2018	"Красиво"	Vadim Seleznev	Красиво
2018	"Хэдшот"	Oleg Tomakov and Dima Nova	Красиво
2018	"Уйди, но останься"	Roman Kim	Красиво
2019	"Никаких больше вечеринок"	Alexander Irinarkhov	Комета
2019	"Солд Аут"	Dima Nova	No album
2019	"Комета"	Alexander Irinarkhov	Комета
2020	"Плачу на техно" (Cream Soda & Хлеб)	No data	No album
2020	"Сердце лёд"	Alexander Irinarkhov	Интергалактик
2021	"Атомы"	No data	Интергалактик
2021	"Розовый фламинго" (Cream Soda & Алёна Свиридова)	No data	No album
2021	"Подожгу"	Dmitry Pepeliaev, Misha Semichev	

== Awards and nominations ==
Award	Year	Nominee(s)	Category	Result	Ref.
Berlin Music Video Awards	2021	"Комета"	Best Narrative	Nominated	
Berlin Music Video Awards	2022	"It'll Set It on Fire"	Most Bizarre	Nominated	
Jager Music Awards	2018	Themselves	Electronic of the Year	Nominated	
Jager Music Awards	2019	Themselves	Electronic of the Year	Nominated	
Jager Music Awards	2019	Themselves	Group of the Year	Nominated	
Jager Music Awards	2019	"Никаких больше вечеринок"	Video of the Year	Nominated	
Jager Music Awards	2019	"Никаких больше вечеринок"	Song of the Year	Nominated	
Jager Music Awards	2020	"Плачу на техно"	Song of the Year	Won	
MTV Europe Music Awards	2020	Themselves	Best Russian Act	Nominated	
Muz-TV Awards	2021	"Плачу на техно"	Video of the Year	Nominated	
Russian National Music Awards	2020	"Плачу на техно"	Dance Song of the Year	Won	
