= Animal Jazz =

Russian rock band

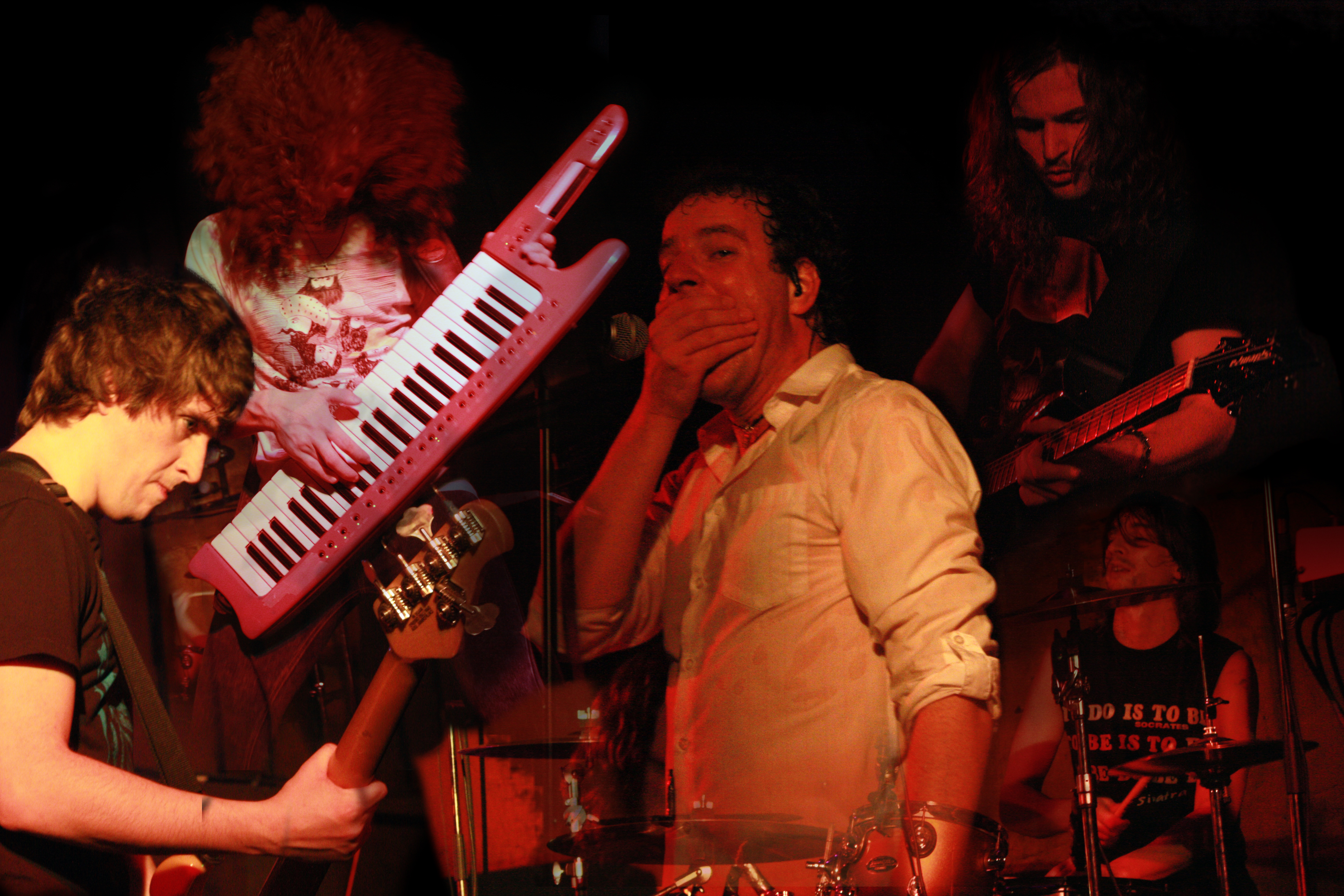
- Animal Jazz performing in 2009

Background information
- Origin: Saint Petersburg, Russia
- Genres: Alternative rock; post-grunge; art rock; indie rock; alternative metal
- Years active: 2000–present
- Labels: Kap-Kan Records
- Members: Alexander Krasovitski; Evgenyi Ryahovski; Alexander Zarankin; Andrey Arkhipov; Ruslan Timonin
- Past members: Igor Buligin; Sergey Egorov; Boris Golodets; Stanislav Gavrilov; Yan Lemskiy; Andrey Kazachenko; Sergey Kivin
- Website: animaljazz.com

Animal ДжаZ ("ДжаZ" can be transliterated as "jazz", although "джаз" is the usual Russian spelling) is a Russian, Saint Petersburg-based alternative rock and pop rock band, formed in 2000. They are best known for their 2006 song "Три полоски", which is associated with the popularity of a so-called "emo subculture" in Russia. As of 2026, Animal ДжаZ have released 19 studio albums, including seven acoustic records.

== Band members ==
Current

- Alexander "Mikhalych" Krasovitski – vocals (2000–present)
- Evgenyi "Johnson" Ryahovski – guitar (2000–present)
- Alexander Zarankin – keyboards (2007–present)
- Andrey Arkhipov – bass (2020–present)
- Ruslan Timonin – drums (2024–present)

Past

- Sergey Egorov – drums (2000–2004)
- Boris Golodets – keyboards (2000–2004)
- Igor Buligin – bass (2000–2020)
- Stanislav Gavrilov – keyboards (2004–2005)
- Andey Kazachenko – keyboards (2005–2007)
- Yan Lemskiy – drums (2004–2008)
- Sergey Kivin – drums (2008–2024)

== Discography ==
Studio albums

- Animalизм (2002)
- Стереолюбовь (2004)
- Как Люди (2004)
- Шаг Вдох (2007)
- Эгоист (2009)
- Animal ДжаZ (2011)
- Фаза быстрого сна (2013)
- Хранитель весны (2015)
- Счастье (2018)
- Время любить (2019)
- Инь (2023)
- Янь (2024)

Acoustic albums

- Unplugged (2005)
- Unplugged II: раритеты (2006)
- 1:0 в пользу осени (2007)
- AZXV: Акустика (2016)
- Acoustic with Detsl (2018)
- Время любить (Акустика) (2019)
- Корни (2023)

Soundtracks

- Graffiti (2006)

Compilations

- The Best (2004)
- Single Collection (2005)
- AZXV (2015)
- Шаг Вдох. Трибьют (2017)
