= Little Big =

Russian rave band

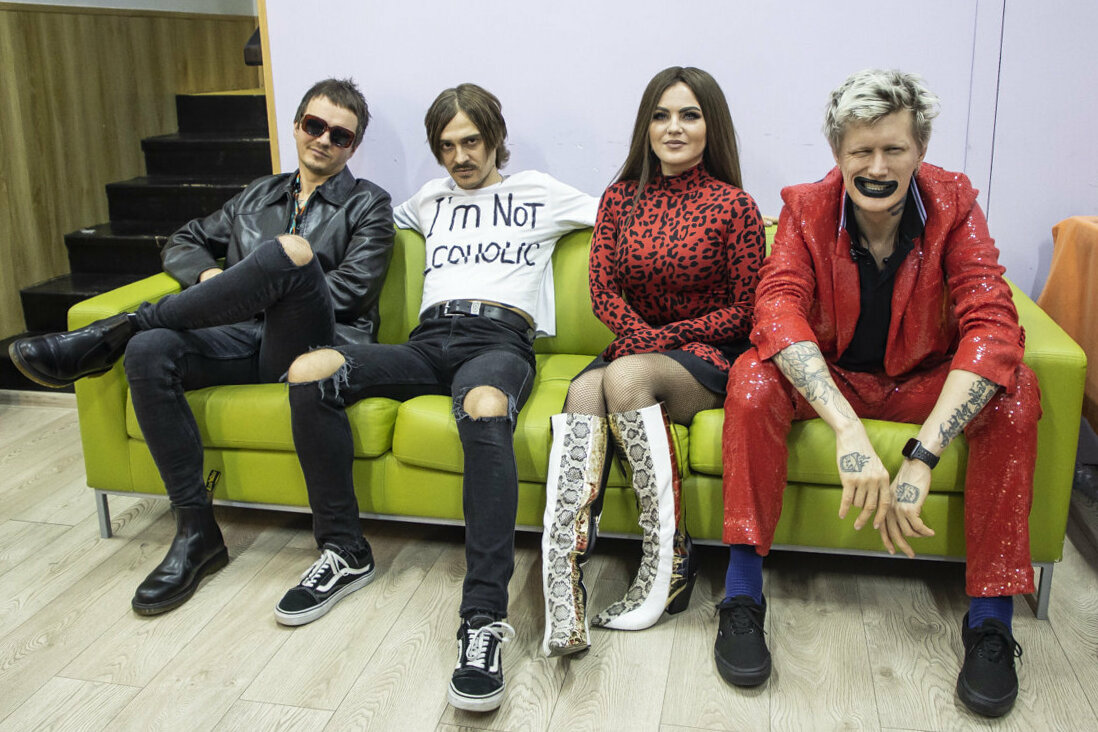
- Little Big in 2019

Background information
- Origin: Saint Petersburg, Russia
- Genres: Rave; pop; hip hop; EDM
- Years active: 2013–present
- Labels: Little Big Family; Warner
- Members: Ilya "Ilich" Prusikin; Sonya Tayurskaya
- Past members: Olympia Ivleva; Anna Kast; Sergey "Gokk" Makarov; Anton "Boo" Lissov
- Website: littlebig.band

Little Big is a Russian rave band founded in Saint Petersburg in 2013 and currently based in Los Angeles, California, following the Russian invasion of Ukraine. The band currently consists of Ilya "Ilich" Prusikin and Sonya Tayurskaya. Their first full-length album, With Russia from Love, was released on 17 March 2014.

== History ==
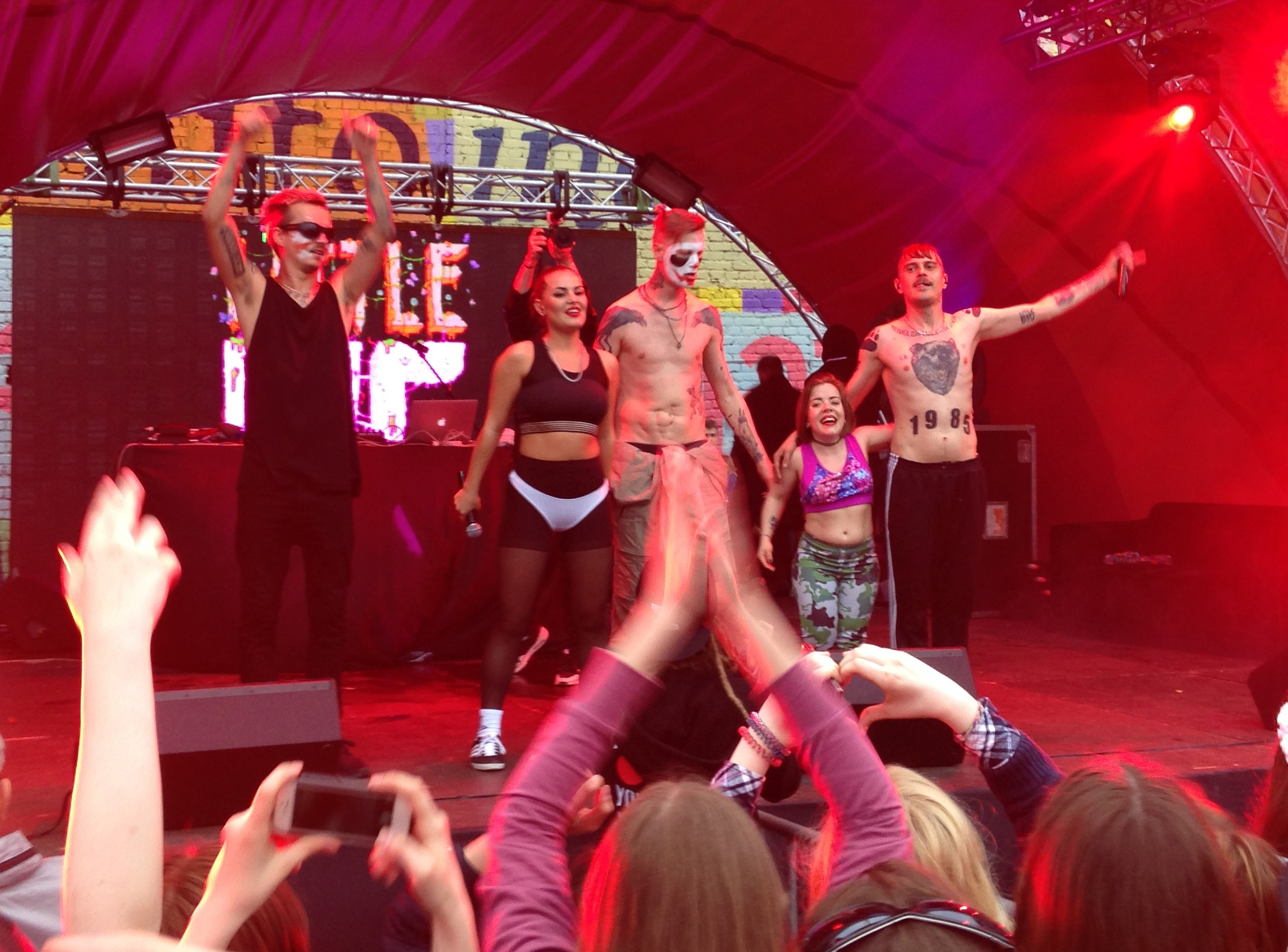
Little Big onstage in 2016. From left to right: Sergey "Gokk" Makarov, Sonya Tayurskaya, Anton Lissov, Olympia Ivleva, Ilya "Ilich" Prusikin

The band was formed by musician Ilya Prusikin and videomaker Alina Pasok and made their debut on 1 April 2013, releasing their first video "Every Day I'm Drinking". They made their first public appearance on 2 July 2013 at the club A2, opening for Die Antwoord. They have toured in Europe, Russia, and North America. "This music is really in demand. We have not invested a single penny, just shot a video, and became known in Europe", Prusikin said in an interview with UTV. On 19 December 2015, the band released their second album, Funeral Rave. It was 8th on the Russian iTunes chart for the 52nd week of 2015. On 21 May 2016, videos for the songs "Give Me Your Money" and "Big Dick" received a prize at the Berlin Music Video Awards 2016. "Big Dick" won Most Trashy, and "Give Me Your Money" won third place for Best Performer. "Big Dick", with over 70 million views, is full of sexual imagery and overtones. "We just want to show people that they own their lives. Countries and governments are not as important as they think, a person can deal with what he wants", said frontman Ilya Prusikin on the purpose of the band in an interview with Noisey. The band has its own label "Little Big Family", which includes Little Big (2016–present), The Hatters (2016–present), Tatarka (2016–present), Khleb (2017–present), and Lizer (2018–present).

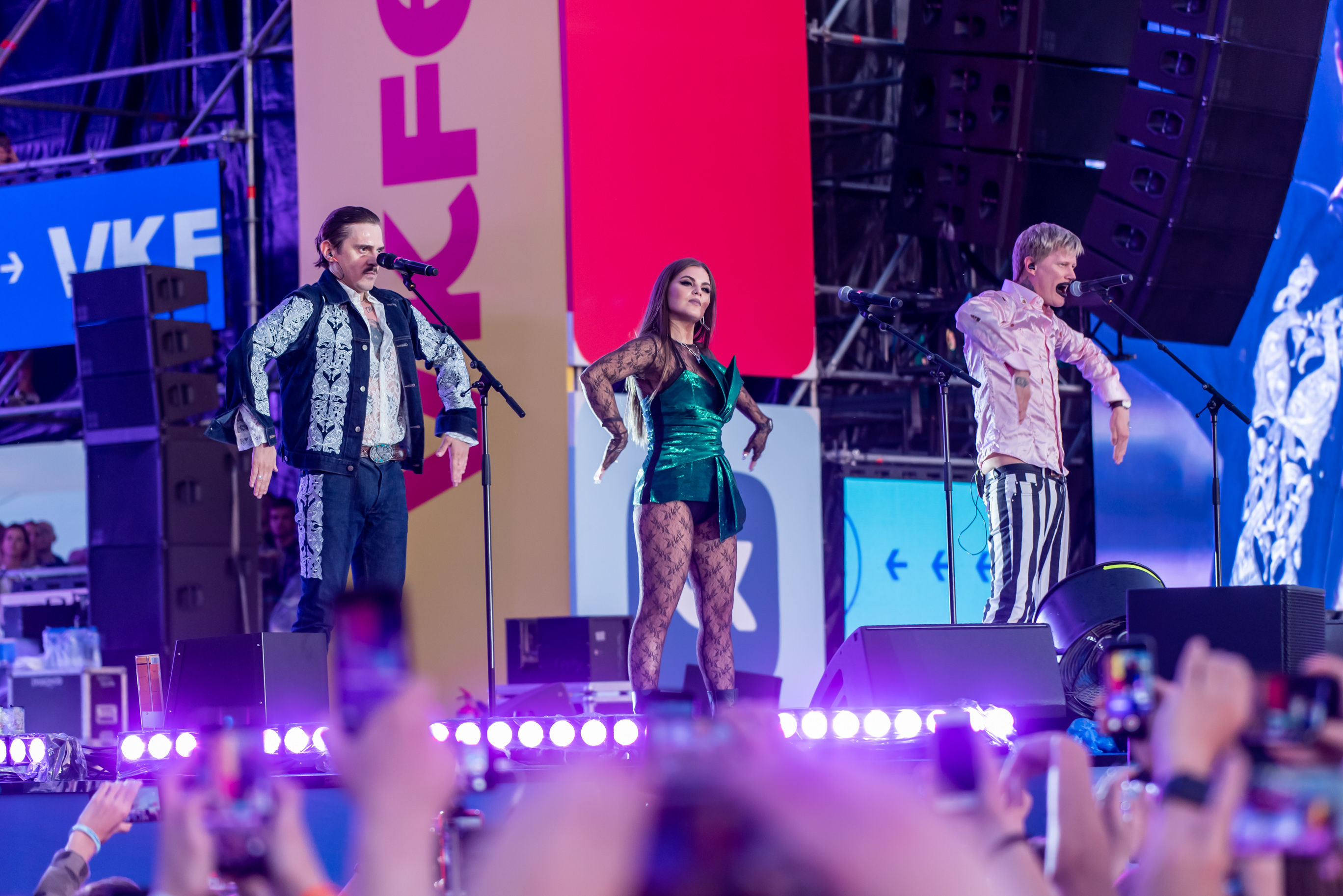
Little Big performing at VK Fest in 2019

In April 2018, Olympia Ivleva decided to leave the band. Later that year, she stated her "burnout after five years of doing the same job", combined with intention to start her own non-musical businesses (chocolate paste and lingerie), were the reasons behind her exit. Little Big achieved viral success with the release of the video for "Skibidi" on 5 October 2018. The video features a dance that became popular when others tried to imitate it as part of the "Skibidi Challenge". Little Big took the first prize in the Most Trashy category at the 2018 Berlin Music Video Awards for their music video ''Lolly Bomb'', and their music video ''Skibidi'' won the first place in the Best Concept category in the festival's 2019 edition.

In March 2020, Little Big were announced as Russia's entry for the Eurovision Song Contest 2020, where they would have performed "Uno". The music video for the song, released at the same time, features Yuri Muzychenko from The Hatters and Florida Chanturia from Leningrad, both of whom were to join the band on stage during the contest. However, on 18 March 2020, the event was cancelled due to the COVID-19 pandemic. In 2020, the band won the Most Trashy category with their video ''Go Bananas'' at the Berlin Music Video Awards. The same year, they also placed third for the Best Music Video. In October 2020, Little Big's cover version of "Gonna Make You Sweat (Everybody Dance Now)" was used over both the trailer and the closing credits of Borat Subsequent Moviefilm. On 30 December 2020, the group performed the song "Mamma Maria" on the Evening Urgant New Year's special, Ciao, 2020!, under the name 'Piccolo Grandi'.

On 1 March 2021, Little Big announced on Instagram that founding member Anna Kast had died. On 8 March 2021, Little Big released a new single, "Sex Machine," along with a video which referenced the video to "Uno" the year prior. However, they subsequently posted on Instagram, "We are not going to Eurovision 2021. We think that Russia has many talented and unique artists, each one of them deserves the chance to be seen out there." Little Big was nominated for Best Art Director with their music video ''S*ck My D*ck 2020'' at the Berlin Music Video Awards 2021. On 24 November 2021, Little Big released the video "“LITTLE BIG NFT SURPRISEN EGG” episode 1" (sic) to announce that the band was making NFTs. On 1 December 2021, people could buy 1 of 1000 unique surprise eggs which would hatch a week later, revealing one of the designs. Prusikin stated that they were inspired by Kinder Surprise Eggs, which are popular in Russia. On 11 February 2022, the single 'Ebobo' by Glukoza was 'Inspired and Evilized by Little Big'. Members of the group can be seen in the music video and on the cover art for the single.

Following the 2022 Russian invasion of Ukraine, the two leaders of the band, Prusikin and Tayurskaya, relocated to Los Angeles, California on 2 March of that same year. They stated that they were on a government blacklist, and aren't allowed to perform any shows in Russia. When asked about a possible return to Russia, they stated that it will be possible "when Putin leaves". On 24 June, the band released the single "Generation Cancellation", which carries a pacifist, anti-war message, characterizing it as a war of war profiteering old men, a chess game with soldiers as chess pieces to be sacrificed at will, with gloomy consequences on younger generations. After the release of the song, they condemned the actions of the Russian government and Russian war propaganda. However, the song was regarded by some Ukrainians as rather anti-American and anti-West rather than anti-Russian. A protest by Ukrainian activists caused their show in Kraków, that was supposed to take place 12 November, to be cancelled. In Russia, they were accused of being "traitors" by the government-controlled media. Prusikin was designated in Russia as a "foreign agent". The band planned to release a fifth studio album in 2022, but did not end up doing so, and was instead released as Lobster Popstar in 2024. Prusikin noted that "We are a band that likes to work in so many styles: pop, rave, punk and hardcore. And (now) we embody our ambition and love for different genres in the (new) album. It will be different". In 2026, they released their sixth studio album THREE STRIPES NATION Pt. 1.

== Musical style ==
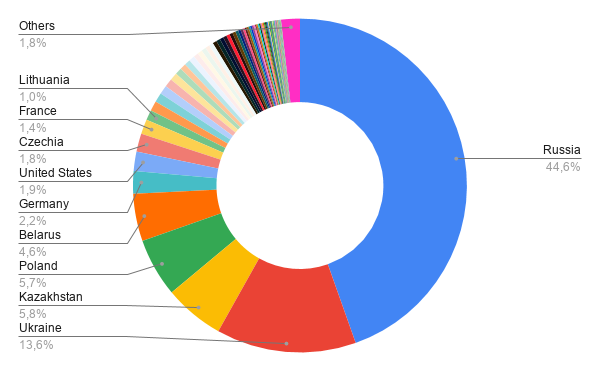
Less than a half of Little Big's 738 million yearly YouTube views were from Russia, as of March 13, 2020.

The team calls itself a satirical art collaboration, which relies on the music, visuals, and the show. Little Big mocks various national stereotypes about Russia. All the videos are filmed by co-founder Alina Pasok. The band shoots and produces all of their music videos.

Since the first concert took place as the opening act for Die Antwoord, the band was dubbed "The Russian Die Antwoord", and is often compared with this band. Vice also called Little Big "a Russian mental patient's answer to Die Antwoord". Other critics point out that while Little Big has an identity of its own, it also exposes the listener to Russian folk songs and Russian culture.

The band was influenced by a variety of musicians including Cannibal Corpse, NOFX, Red Hot Chili Peppers, Rammstein, and The Prodigy to Mozart and Vivaldi.

== Band members ==
Current members

- Ilya "Ilich" Prusikin – frontman, vocals (2013–present)
- Sonya Tayurskaya – vocals (recording 2014–present; live 2016–present)

Former members

- Anna Kast – backing vocals (2013–2014; died 2021)
- Olympia Ivleva – vocals (2013–2018)
- Sergey "Gokk" Makarov – DJ, backing vocals (2013–2022)
- Anton "Boo" Lissov – vocals, guitar (2014–2022)

Touring members

- Danny Zuckerman – DJ, backing vocals (2023–present)

== Discography ==
- With Russia From Love (2014)
- Funeral Rave (2015)
- Antipositive, Pt. 1 (2018)
- Antipositive, Pt. 2 (2018)
- Lobster Popstar (2024)
- Three Stripes Nation Pt. 1 (2026)
- Three Stripes Nation Pt. 2 (upcoming)

== Awards and nominations ==
Year	Country	Prize	Category	Nominee	Result	Notes
2015	Russia	Wildfest 'Like 2015'	Like for music	Little Big	Nomination	
2016	Russia	Wildfest 'Like 2016'	Like for the song	Big Dick	Nomination	
2016	Russia	Alfa Future Awards	TOP-100 best DJs in Russia	Little Big	89th place	
2016	Germany	Berlin Music Video Awards	Most Trashy	Big Dick	Win	
2016	Germany	Berlin Music Video Awards	Best Performer	Give Me Your Money	Nomination	
2018	USA	Global Film Festival Awards	Best Music Video	Lolly Bomb	Win	
2018	Germany	Berlin Music Video Awards	Most Trashy	Lolly Bomb	Win	
2019	Belgium	Ketnet The Gala of the Golden K's 2018	Hype of the year	Skibidi	Win	
2019	Russia	Chart Dozen	Clip	Skibidi	Win	
2019	Russia	Native Sound	Best Pop	Little Big	Nomination	
2019	Russia	Native Sound	Best Meme	Little Big	Win	
2019	Russia	Native Sound	Best Clip of the Year	Skibidi	Nomination	
2019	Russia	BraVo	Music Video of the Year	Skibidi	Win	
2019	Germany	Berlin Music Video Awards	Best Concept	Skibidi	Win	
2019	Russia	RU.TV Award 2019	Best Duet	Слэмятся пацаны	Nomination	
2019	Russia	TopHit Music Video Awards 2019	Video Clip of the Year on YouTube in Russia (mixed voals)	Skibidi	Win	
2019	Russia	TopHit Music Video Awards 2019	Rise of the Year on YouTube in Russia	Little Big	Win	
2020	Russia	New Radio Awards	Best Producer	Little Big Family	Win	
2020	Germany	Berlin Music Video Awards	Most Trashy	Go Bananas	Win	
2021	Russia	Muz-TV Award	The Best Group	Little Big	Win	
2021	Germany	Berlin Music Video Awards	Best Art Director	S*CK MY D*CK 2020	Nominated	
2023	USA	WorldFest-Houston International Film Festival	Music Video – New Artist	Generation Cancellation	Win	
2023	Germany	Berlin Music Video Awards	Best Concept	GENERATION CANCELLATION	Nomination	
2023	Germany	Berlin Music Video Awards	Best Director	Pendejo	Nomination	
2024	Germany	Berlin Music Video Awards	Best Narrative	It Happens	Nomination	
2024	Germany	Berlin Music Video Awards	Best Trashy	Boobs	Nomination	

== See also ==
- Little Big videography

Awards and achievements
Preceded by Sergey Lazarev with "Scream"	Russia in the Eurovision Song Contest; 2020 (cancelled)	Succeeded by Manizha with "Russian Woman"
