= Ilya Prusikin =

Russian musician (born 1985)

- Илья Прусикин
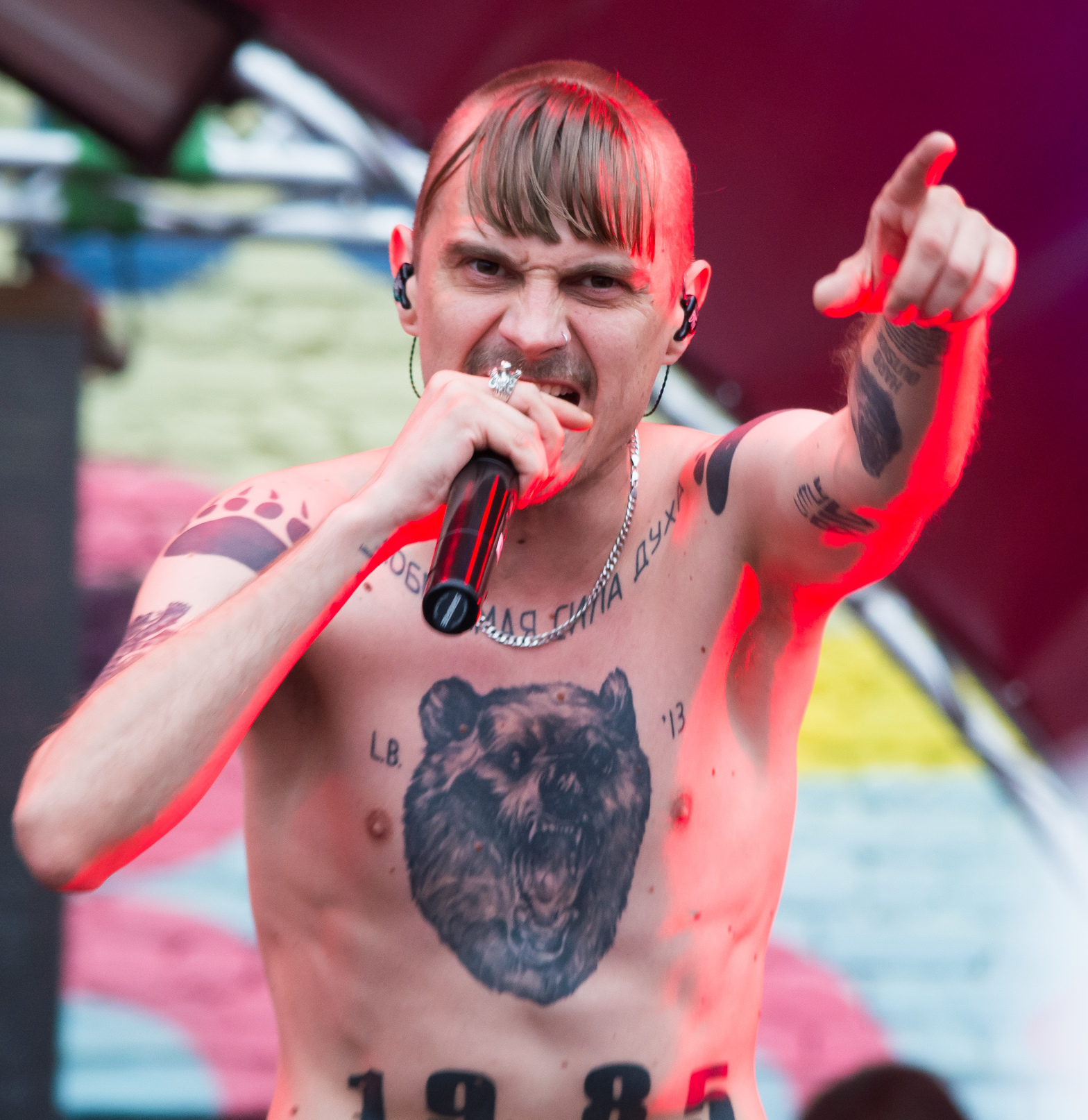
- Prusikin on Vidfest 2016, Saint Petersburg
- Born: Ilya Vladimirovich Prusikin; 8 April 1985 (age 41); Ust'-Borzya, Ononsky District, Chita Oblast, RSFSR, USSR
- Other name: Ilich
- Education: Saint Petersburg State University of Culture and Arts
- Spouse: Irina Smelaya (m. 2016; div. 2020) Sonya Tayurskaya (m. 2022)
- Children: Dobrynya Prusikin (with Irina Smelaya); Sasha Prusikin (with Sonya Taturskaya)
- Musical career
- Origin: Saint Petersburg
- Genres: Rave; electropop; alternative dance; nu metal; emo
- Member of: Little Big
- Formerly of: Tenkorr

Ilya Vladimirovich Prusikin (Russian: Илья́ Влади́мирович Пруси́кин, born 8 April 1985) is a Russian musician, singer, record producer, vlogger, video director and screenwriter. He is best known as the front person and founder of Saint Petersburg punk-pop-rave group Little Big. He is also known under the stage name Ilich (Russian: Ильич), an in-joke referencing Vladimir Lenin's patronymic and Oblomov character.

== Life and career ==
Ilya Prusikin was born in Siberia, in the village of Ust'-Borzya, Chita Oblast (now Zabaykalsky Krai). In his early infancy, he moved to Sosnovy Bor, situated in Leningrad Oblast, with his parents. He studied piano at a local children's musical school. Prusikin later graduated from Saint-Petersburg State University of Culture and Arts with a degree in psychology.

In 2011, he started a collaboration with a subsidiary project of the Russian fun-production studio "My Ducks Vision" by Yuri Degtyarev named "Thank you, Eva!", uniting video bloggers into one large affiliate network, and in 2012 he directed "Guffy Gough Show" (2012) and "The Great Rap Battle" (2012). Both of his programs went on to become the network's highest-rated videos. Also in 2012, Prusikin produced and directed the Internet sitcom "Police Weekdays" (Russian: «Полицейские будни»). After three episodes, the show was cancelled indefinitely.

In 2013, Prusikin and Eldar Dzharakhov founded the artistic partnership “ClickKlak”. According to them, the audience of ClickKlack consists of "boys and girls with an active lifestyle and a good sense of humour". The channel's page contains such shows as “Give the Bream” (Russian: «Дай леща»), “Thrash Lotto” (Russian: «Трэш лото»), “As You Say” (Russian: «Как скажешь»), “Shocking Karaoke” (Russian: «Шокирующее караоке»), “Experiments' Destroyers” (Russian: «Разрушители экспериментов»), “Kick the Bucket” (Russian: «Сыграл в ящик»), etc.

=== Musical career ===
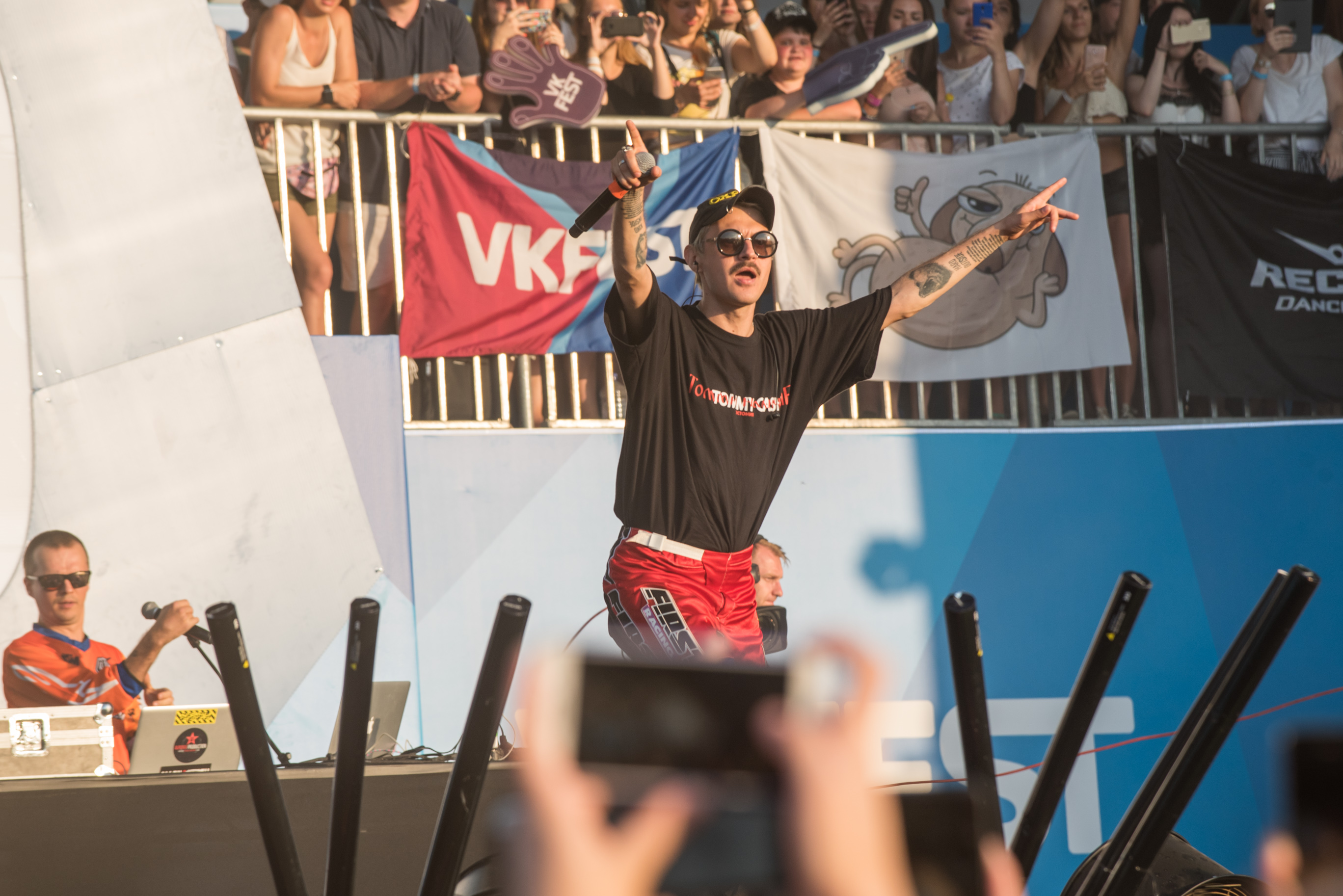
Ilya Prusikin with Little Big at VK Fest 2018 in Saint Petersburg, July 2018.

In 2003, Ilyich became a member of nu-metal band Tenkorr. Prusikin also gained experience working with the other groups, Like A Virgin, St. Bastards and Construktorr among them. Prusikin has since achieved greater domestic and international recognition with the band Little Big, founded on April 1, 2013. All music videos of the band are shot by its co-founder, Alina Pasok (Russian: Алина Пязок).

== Personal life ==
On July 6, 2016, Prusikin married musician Irina Smelaya, better known by her stage name Tatarka. Their son Dobrynya was born on November 26, 2017. On August 21, 2020, Smelaya and Prusikin announced their separation on YouTube.

Since August 2020 Ilya Prusikin has been in a relationship with Sonya Tayurskaya. Tayurskaya told about it in an interview with Ksenia Sobchak. In May 2024, the couple announced that they were expecting a child and shared pictures with their daughter in November 2024.

== Political views ==
In 2018, Prusikin quoted the famous aphorism: "The [Russian] state has murdered my Motherland" and criticised the Russian populace's easy-going attitude towards life and, especially, local indifference towards corruption. In a 2019 interview with Xenia Sobchak, Prusikin spoke of his total dislike of modern Russian politics, emphasising the increased "cult of intolerance and anger" in internal politics after 2012. He publicly supported Ivan Golunov during the journalist's persecution.

In 2022 after the Russian invasion of Ukraine, Prusikin stated "We adore our country, but we completely disagree with the war in Ukraine, moreover, we believe that any war is unacceptable." He also got a tattoo saying "No war" on his arm. He announced that he had left the country and relocated to Los Angeles with the singer Sonya, stating that "we are so disgusted by the Russian military propaganda machine that we decided to drop everything and leave the country." Later on 23 June 2022 he (as Little Big) released the single "Generation Cancellation".

On January 7, 2023, Prusikin posted a video of himself skateboarding on a cross-shaped board, which sparked outrage and accusations of blasphemy among Russian social media users and media figures. After that, Orthodox activists wrote a statement against the leader of Little Big Prusikin to the Investigative Committee of Russia outraged by the "satanic ritual" of riding a skateboard in the form of a cross. Georgy Soldatov, a lawyer for the movement, said the "talented performer" deliberately uploaded a video of him riding a cross-shaped plank because he was convinced he would not return to Russia. "I’m sure the case will be initiated, and it will be more difficult for Mr. Prusikin to return to Russia," Soldatov said..

On January 27, 2023, he was included by the Ministry of Justice of the Russian Federation in the list of "foreign agents".

In September 2026, Russia's Ministry of Internal Affairs placed Prusikin on the federal wanted list after a criminal case was opened against him.
