= Russia in the Eurovision Song Contest 2022 =

- Eurovision Song Contest 2022
- Participating broadcaster: All-Russia State Television and Radio Broadcasting Company (VGTRK)
- Country: Russia

Placement
- Semi-final result: Excluded

Participation chronology

Russia was set to be represented at the Eurovision Song Contest 2022 in Turin, Italy. However, on 25 February 2022, due to the Russian invasion of Ukraine, the European Broadcasting Union (EBU) excluded Russia from participating. Russia was originally set to perform in the second half of the first semi-final on 10 May 2022.

== Background ==
Prior to the 2022 contest, Russia has participated in the Eurovision Song Contest 23 times since its first entry in 1994. Russia has won the contest on one occasion in 2008 with the song "Believe" performed by Dima Bilan. In 2016, Russia finished third with the song "You Are the Only One" performed by Sergey Lazarev, who would later return to represent his country again in 2019 with the song "Scream", also finishing in third place. In 2018, Russia placed fifteenth in the second semi-final with the song "I Won't Break" performed by Yuliya Samoylova, making it the first time Russia did not qualify for the final since the introduction of semi-finals in 2004. In 2021, "Russian Woman" performed by Manizha qualified for the final and ultimately finished ninth with 204 points.

== Before Eurovision ==
=== Artist selection ===
No official announcement was made by national broadcaster VGTRK regarding the Russian selection for 2022. According to unconfirmed rumours, shortlisted acts included Aleksandr Panayotov, Danya Milokhin, Egor Kreed, Vanya Dmitrienko, Klava Koka and Yaroslava Simonova. Later, the number of artists on the shortlist was reduced to three: two women (Klava Koka, Yaroslava Simonova) and one man, among whom VGTRK selected a representative. Ultimately, Yaroslava Simonova was reportedly selected as the Russian representative.

=== Calls for exclusion ===
In the wake of the Russian invasion of Ukraine, which began on 24 February 2022, Ukrainian broadcaster UA:PBC appealed to suspend Russian EBU member broadcasters VGTRK and Channel One from the union, and to exclude Russia from competing in the contest. The appeal alleged that since the beginning of the Russian military intervention in Ukraine in 2014, VGTRK and Channel One had been a mouthpiece for the Russian government and a key tool of political propaganda financed from the Russian state budget. The EBU initially stated that Russia as well as Ukraine would still be allowed to participate in the contest, citing the non-political nature of the event. Gustav Lützhøft, editor-in-chief of Dansk Melodi Grand Prix for Danish broadcaster DR, stated: "we find it incompatible with Eurovision's values that Russia is participating." Sweden's SVT, Iceland's RÚV, Lithuania's LRT and Norway's NRK also called on the EBU to exclude Russia from the contest, while the Netherlands' AVROTROS, Poland's TVP and Ukraine's UA:PBC additionally called on the EBU to suspend Russia's membership of the union. Estonia's ERR and Finland's Yle stated that they would not participate if Russia were invited. Latvian representatives at the 2022 contest, Citi Zēni, called on the EBU in an email to reconsider their decision to allow Russia to compete.

== Exclusion ==
On 25 February 2022, the EBU announced that Russia would not compete at the contest, stating that "in light of the unprecedented crisis in Ukraine, the inclusion of a Russian entry in this year's Contest would bring the competition into disrepute." The following day, all EBU members from Russia, including VGTRK and Channel One, announced their withdrawal from the union; however, the EBU itself had yet to receive a confirmation. On 1 March, a further statement from the EBU announced that it had suspended its Russian members from its governance structures.

== After Eurovision ==
On 26 May 2022, the EBU made effective the suspension of its Russian members, causing Russia to indefinitely lose broadcasting and participation rights for future Eurovision events.

=== Russia's exclusion as an example of historical precedence ===
The humanitarian crisis resulting from Israeli military operations in the Gaza Strip during the Gaza war led to calls for the EBU to exclude Israel from taking part in the Eurovision Song Contest 2024. The EBU's decision to maintain Israel as a participant was compared to its decision to exclude Russia in 2022, with some accusing the EBU of "hypocrisy" and exhibiting "double standards". (Note: Attributed to multiple references:) On 12 December 2023, the Association of Composers and Lyricists of Iceland (FTT) and activists of the Boycott, Divestment and Sanctions (BDS) movement, joined by the Icelandic branch of OGAE, sent formal requests that the Icelandic broadcaster RÚV withdraw from the event unless Israel was excluded "on the same grounds as Russia in the last competition"; meanwhile, a week later, Finnish broadcaster Yle commented that the war was not comparable to the Russian invasion of Ukraine. In early March 2024, Walloon minister of culture and media Bénédicte Linard announced that she would formally request local broadcaster RTBF (responsible for Belgium's participation in 2024) to push for the exclusion of Israel from the contest, citing – among others – the exclusion of Russia in 2022; her Flemish counterpart Benjamin Dalle expressed support for the reasoning.
