= Evrovidenie =

Russian Eurovision Song Contest preselection

- Also known as: Evrovidenie. Nacionalny Otbor
- Genre: Music, entertainment
- Created by: Channel One (C1R); Russia-1 (RTR)
- Country of origin: Russia
- Original language: Russian
- No. of series: 9 editions
- No. of episodes: 20

Production
- Camera setup: Multi-camera
- Running time: Variable
- Production companies: Programma "A" (1994, 1996); RGTRK Ostankino & Lis's (1995); VID (2005); VGTRK (2008, 2010, 2012); Krasny Kvadrat (2009); Channel One (2021)

Original release
- Network: Russia-1 (1994–2012); Channel One (1995–2021)
- Release: 12 March 1994 – 8 March 2021 (Note: Aired intermittently.)

Related
- Eurovision Song Contest

Evrovidenie. Nacionalny Otbor (Russian: Евровидение. Национальный отбор, IPA: [jɪvrɐˈvʲidʲɪnʲɪjɪ nətsɨɐˈnalʲnɨj ɐdˈbor], lit. 'Eurovision. National Selection'), Nacionalny Otbor na Evrovidenie (Russian: Национальный отбор на Евровидение, IPA: [nətsɨɐˈnalʲnɨj ɐdˈbor nə jɪvrɐˈvʲidʲɪnʲɪjɪ], lit. 'National Selection for Eurovision') or simply Evrovidenie (Russian: Евровидение) was a Russian televised musical competition organized by Russian public broadcasters Channel One (previously ORT) in odd years and Russia-1 (RTR) of VGTRK in even years. (Note: Except in 2000 (even year), when ORT (Channel One) was supposed to organize a national selection.) The competition is used to select Russia's representative in the Eurovision Song Contest. Since 2005, it has been streamed live online through the respective websites of the broadcasters. Throughout its history, the competition has been held using different names, including Evrovidenie "Pesnya-95" ('Eurovision "Song-95"') (1995), Pesnya dlya Evropy ('Song for Europe') (1996), Evrovidenie – Vybirayet Rossiya ('Eurovision – Russia Chooses') (2005), Kto? ('Who?) (2014), but has been known for most of its history as Evrovidenie. Nacionalny Otbor (1994, 2008–2010, 2012, 2021).

The competition has produced one winner, one runner-up and two top 10 placings for Russia in the contest. The results of the other selected representatives have ranged from 11th place in both 2009 and 2010 to a record low of 27th place in the 1996 qualifying round. At its inception, the winner of Evrovidenie was chosen by panels of jurors, but this changed to a public televoting system for the 2005 edition. (Note: In 2005, a jury panel provided commentary and feedback to the artists during the show, but did not vote.) The jury structure was then restored for 2008 with a combination of jury and televoting used for 2008, 2009, 2010 and 2012. In 2021, the contest returned to choosing a winner by public televoting only.

== History ==
=== Background and early years ===
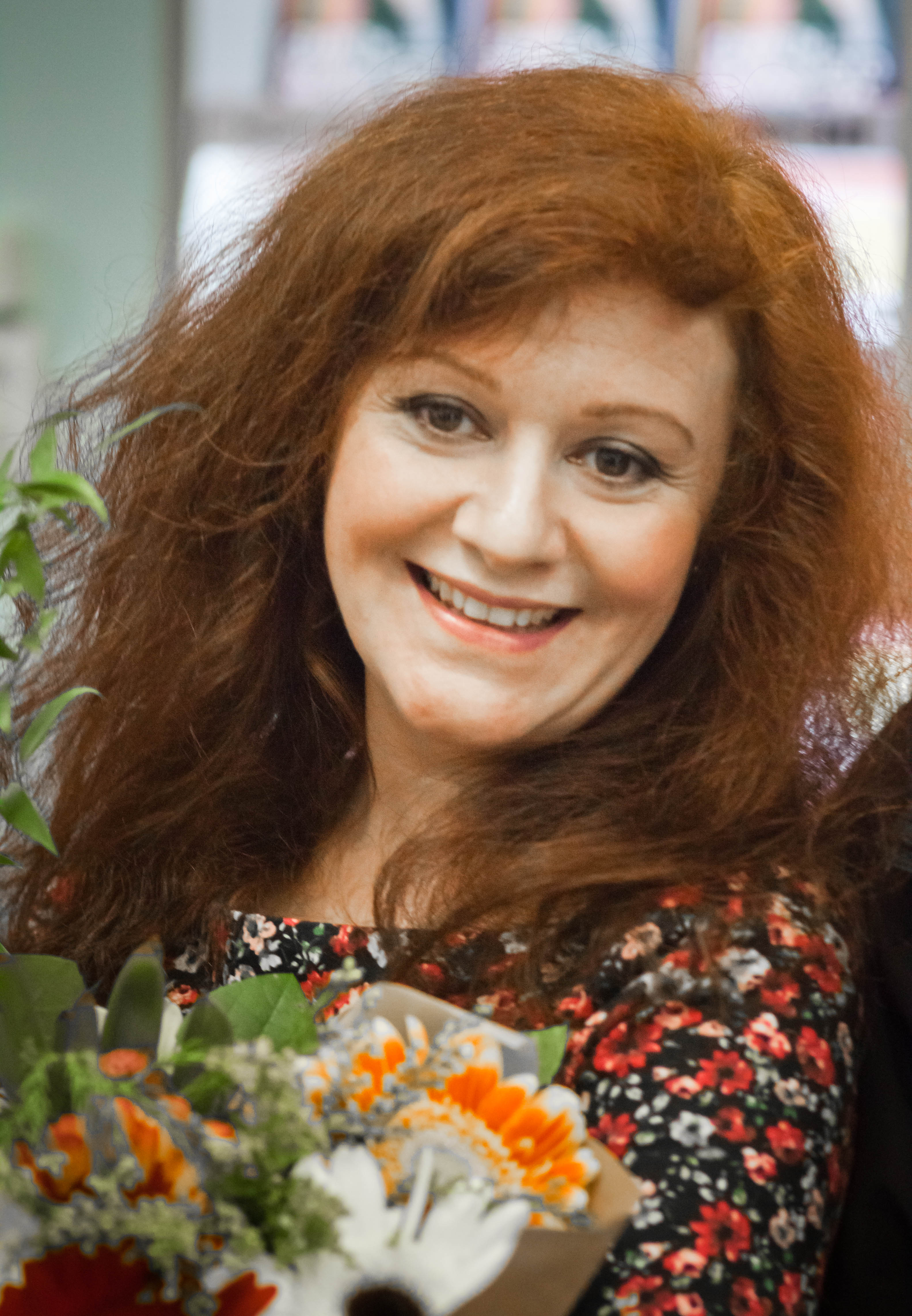
Youddiph (Masha Katz) was selected by Evrovidenie to be the first Russian entrant for the Eurovision Song Contest in 1994.

The European Broadcasting Union (EBU) was formed in 1950 among 23 organisations with the aim of the exchange of television programmes. Following the formation of the EBU, a number of notable events were transmitted through its networks in various European countries, such as Belgium, France, and the United Kingdom. Following this series of transmissions, a "Programme Committee" was set up within the EBU to investigate new initiatives for cooperation between broadcasters. The new European contest, entitled European Grand Prix, was subsequently approved at the EBU's General Assembly in October 1955. The first Eurovision Song Contest took place in Lugano in 1956 with the participation of seven countries.

Russia has been participating in Eurovision Song Contest since 1994. To select its debut entry, Russian broadcaster RTR hosted a national final on 12 March 1994 at the Shabolovka Studios in Moscow during the television programme Programma A, hosted by Vadim Dolgachev. Prior to the event, RTR opened a submissions window for Russian citizens to submit their original songs for consideration. By the close of the submissions window, more than 30 songs had been submitted; eleven candidate entries were then selected by a jury panel from the received submissions. Two songs were later disqualified prior to the competition: "Oi oi oi" performed by Alena Apina was disqualified after being performed on Russian TV channel 2x2 prior to the competition and "Kogda vernus v Rossiyu" performed by Vika Tsiganova, which was withdrawn by Tsiganova after she wanted to change her contest song, which was not allowed by the rules. Nine remaining entries competed with the winning song chosen by a 17-member jury panel. At the close of voting, "Vechny strannik" performed by Youddiph received the most votes and was selected as the Russian entry. At the Eurovision Song Contest 1994, Russia finished ninth with 70 points.

For Russia's second participation in the contest, ORT organised a public selection process to select Russian entrant. The competition was held on 19 March 1995 at the Cosmos Hotel in Moscow and was later aired on 30 April 1995 on ORT. Eight songs competed and the winner was selected by the votes of an expert jury panel. At the conclusion of the voting, Oksana Pavlovskaya and Viktoria Vita tied for the first place. In the end, the jury came to the conclusion that none of the participants deserved to represent Russia, and therefore, the final ended without a winner. The broadcaster later opted to select their 1995 entry internally, since the jury was unable to select a winner.

In 1996, the right to choose Russia's entrant returned to RTR, which decided to organize the national final to select Russia's representative. The event took place on 2 March 1996 and was hosted by Youddiph, the winner of the 1994 edition. Fourteen songs took part in the contest. A jury, which was composed of representatives of RTR, music industry professionals and representatives of the public, selected Andrey Kosinsky as winner with the song "Ya eto ya". Kosinsky was subsequently eliminated in the qualifying round for the Eurovision Song Contest 1996, which was used by the European Broadcasting Union in order to reduce the number of participating nations that would compete in the televised Eurovision final. After the non-qualification, RTR decided not to participate in the Eurovision Song Contest, leaving ORT (Channel One) as the only remaining broadcaster willing to take part in future years. The nation was then relegated from the 1998 and 1999 contests, before being able to return for 2000. For that contest, ORT opened the application window for a national final to take place on 19 February 2000 in Moscow, returning to the format of a national selection for the first time since 1996. However, financial problems at ORT forced them to cancel the event and instead select the Russian entry internally. In the following years, ORT opted to not hold national selections, switching instead to internally selected entrants.

=== 2004–2011 ===
In 2004, Yuri Aksyuta, Head of the Directorate of Music and Entertainment Broadcasting of Channel One, commented on the lack of national selection stating that "It's too early to trust our public". After the Russian discontent with the candidacy of the internally selected Yulia Savicheva in 2004, Channel One decided to change the format of the selection of contestants by holding a national final in 2005 for the first time since 1996. The national final consisted of three semi-finals, with ten songs in both the first and second semi-finals and nine in third; the third semi-final was initially to consist of ten songs as well, but Sergey Mazaev was late for the event and his song was disqualified. Three artists from each semi-final, chosen by televoting, qualified for the final which took place on 25 February. All shows took place in Ostankino Studios in Moscow and broadcast live three times, once in each of the three Russian time zones. All regions participated using televoting and SMS, with the results announced during the final broadcast for Western Russia. The winner of the national final was Natalia Podolskaya with the song "Nobody Hurt No One", receiving 20.2% of the votes. Natalia's victory created a scandal because many people were unable to cast their votes for other contestants, raising doubts about the fairness of the process. According to the company Edmar+, which organised the televoting, the capacity of their lines was limited, and when the mass of connections reached a critical volume, some calls and messages were automatically filtered out. At the Eurovision final, Russia took 15th place out of 24 with 57 points. Among their points was the maximum score of 12 from Belarus, the home country of Podolskaya. Following this result, Channel One decided to return to an internal selection the following year.

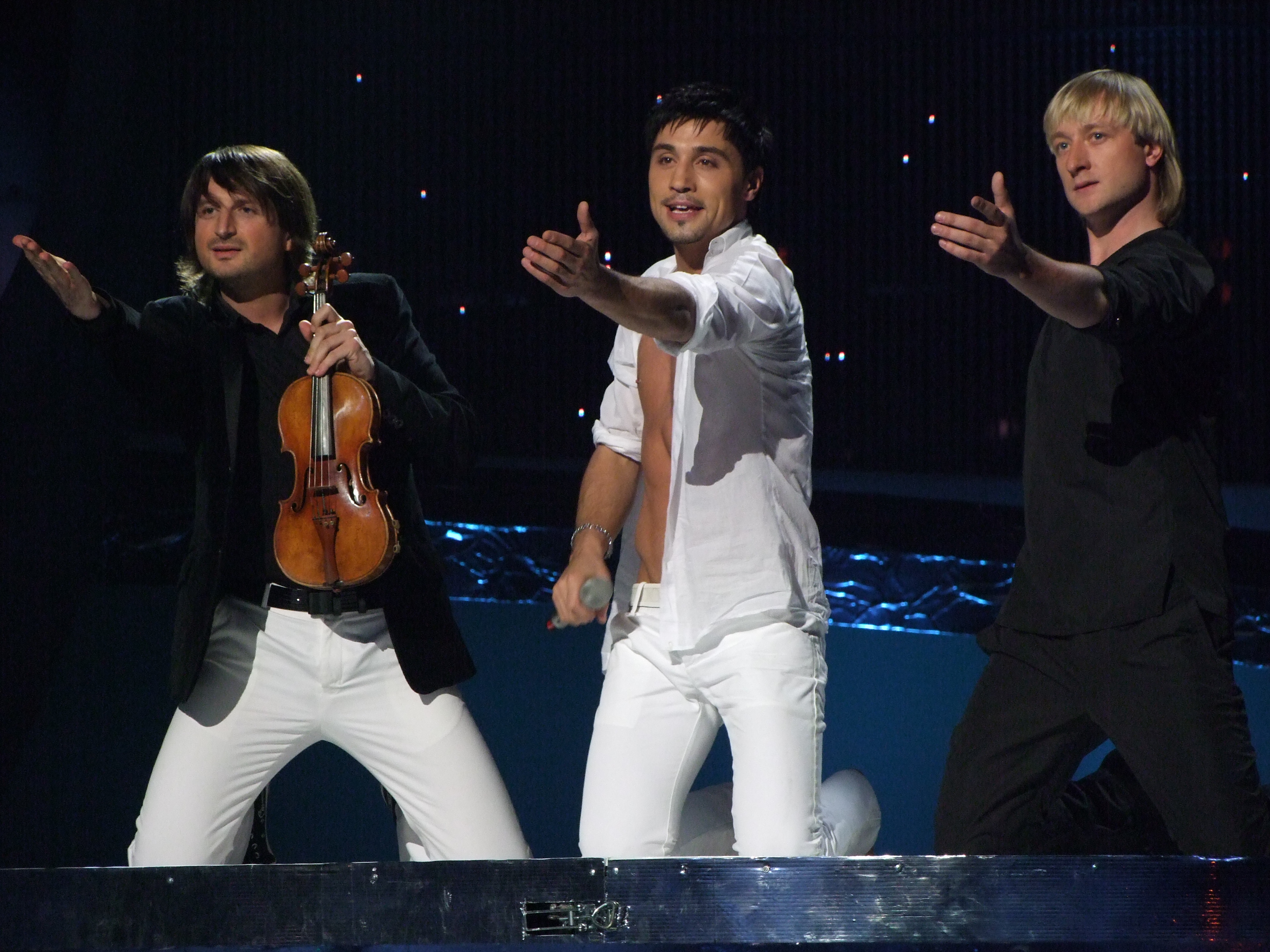
Dima Bilan (center) performing at the Eurovision Song Contest 2008 with Edvin Marton (left) and Evgeni Plushenko (right), brought Russia its first contest win.

In 2008, the selection of Russia's Eurovision entrant returned to RTR, with the broadcaster organising a national selection with twenty-five candidates. Later, this number was increased to 27 after RTR added two participants: Sergey Lazarev and 2006 Belarusian Eurovision entrant Polina Smolova. Other participants included the 2006 Russian Eurovision entrant Dima Bilan, who submitted the song "Por Que Te Amo". The song was disqualified when it was discovered that the song was released in 2006 by Argentinian singer Luciano Pereira, violating the Eurovision rule that barred songs from being commercially released before 1 October 2007. The song was replaced with "Believe", which won the event with 54 points, including the maximum score (27) from both the jury and televoting. Russia won that year's Eurovision Song Contest with 272 points.

After this victory, Channel One announced a national selection in November 2008 and opened a submission period for interested artists and composers to submit their entries. The initial format of the national final consisted of three stages: The first stage was for selecting the song, the second for selecting three artists, and the third for selecting the combination of song and artist. This format was later amended by Channel One, where the artists would instead compete with the songs they had entered with. The broadcaster received over a thousand submissions at the conclusion of the deadline. Fifty of them were shortlisted and a jury panel selected fifteen finalists for the national final. On 5 March 2009, Channel One announced that Anastasia Prikhodko would also participate in the national final with the song "Mamo", increasing the number of participants to sixteen. The national selection took place on 7 March at Ostankino Studios in Moscow and consisted of two stages. According to the results of the televoting, three superfinalists were selected from sixteen contestants: Anastasia Prikhodko, Valeriya, and the band Kvatro. Out of three applicants, a professional jury selected Anastasia Prikhodko's song "Mamo" as the winner. At the Eurovision Song Contest 2009, the song placed 11th with 91 points.

On 9 December 2009, RTR announced a submission period for artists to apply for the Eurovision Song Contest 2010. The broadcaster received over a thousand submissions at the conclusion of the deadline. Thirty-five entries were selected from the received submissions to proceed to auditions held on 1 March 2010 at the Vladimir Nazarov's Theater in Moscow. There, a jury panel selected the twenty-five finalists for the national final. The competing acts were announced on 2 March 2010. Ultimately, at the selection which took place on 7 March in Vladimir Nazarov's Theater in Moscow, the musical group of Peter Nalitch won with the song "Lost and Forgotten". For Eurovision, the band was renamed "Peter Nalitch and Friends". Their final placing in the Eurovision Song Contest 2010 held in Oslo was 11th, tying that of Anastasia Prikhodko the previous year. In 2011, Channel One canceled the national selection because of declining interest and the channel's claims that internally selected applicants placed higher than ones selected through the national selection process.

=== 2012–2021 ===
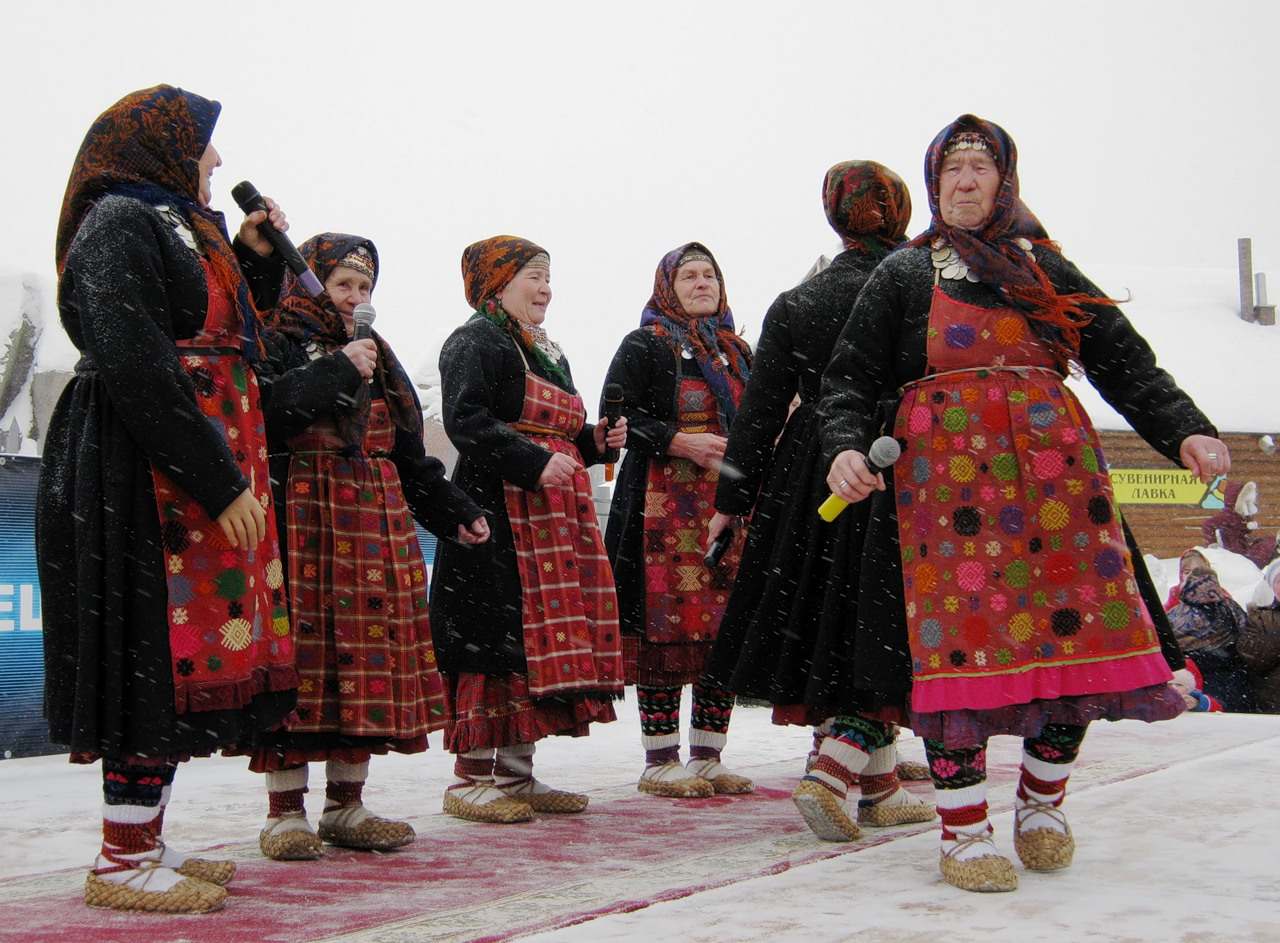
The group Buranovskiye Babushki was selected by Evrovidenie to represent Russia in the Eurovision Song Contest 2012.

After one year of absence, RTR announced on 28 December 2011 that it would reinstate the national selection process, and asked for submissions from artists and composers. The broadcaster received 150 submissions at the conclusion of the deadline, and between thirty-five and forty entries were selected to proceed to auditions. There, a jury panel selected the twenty-five finalists for the national final, which was supposed to take place on 26 February, but was postponed to 7 March. Ultimately, at the selection held in the Akademichesky Concert Hall in Moscow, the winner was the band Buranovskiye Babushki with the song "Party for Everybody", which received 38.51 points. Runner-ups Dima Bilan and Julia Volkova scored 29.25, and third place Timati and Aida Garifullina scored 26.74. The song finished second at the Eurovision Song Contest 2012 with 259 points.

Following the 2012 selection, no Russian national selection was held for eight years. In 2014, a national selection was planned to take place, but was ultimately canceled because the broadcaster thought the song submissions were of poor quality. After the cancellation of the 2014 selection, both RTR and Channel One switched to internal selections. In 2020, Channel One internally selected the band Little Big with the song "Uno" to represent Russia at Eurovision Song Contest 2020. The contest was canceled due to the COVID-19 pandemic, and Channel One originally planned to re-select Little Big for the 2021 contest. However, the band was unable to submit a suitable song, so Channel One decided to hold a national selection for the first time since 2012.

The selection committee at Channel One created shortlist of several candidates, from which three performers were selected for national final: Therr Maitz, #2Mashi and Manizha. The artists selected to participate were announced in the evening of the contest on 8 March and the names of participants were leaked via Instagram two hours before the contest began. The contest took place on 8 March in Mosfilm Studios in Moscow and was won by Manizha with her song "Russian Woman". The song caused controversy as many Russian viewers took offense to a singer of Tajik descent singing about Russian women and the singer's activism for LGBT and women's rights; they demanded that she drop out of Eurovision. Several Russian politicians, such as Vladimir Zhirinovsky, Vitaly Milonov, Valentina Matvienko, Pavel Rudchenko and Yelena Drapeko also criticized Manizha's song. Drapeko suggested banning Manizha from performing in Eurovision under the Russian flag, commenting also that Eurovision offered no cultural value and was too politicized and pro-LGBT. The entry still went on to represent the nation at the contest in Rotterdam, Netherlands, and in the final Manizha reached 9th place with 204 points, of which 104 points were from the juries and 100 were from televoting. Following the Eurovision final, on 26 May 2021, Wonderzine published an article that retold reports from other sources that the national selection was staged, and Manizha's victory was a foregone conclusion. According to the article, Manizha's relatives are connected with state corporations. The next day, Manizha stated that she would file a lawsuit against Wonderzine and author of the article Yulia Taratuta.

The 2021 selection was the last Russian national selection to date, as on 25 February 2022, the EBU announced that Russia would not be allowed to compete at the 2022 contest due to the Russian invasion of Ukraine. The following day, all EBU members from Russia, including RTR and Channel One, announced their withdrawal from the union, according to a statement released by Russian state media, marking the end of Russian participation in Eurovision for the foreseeable future.

== Series overview ==
Color key

Male artist
Female artist
Band/duo

Year	Premiere	Finale	Contestants	Episodes	Winner	Runner-up	Third place
1994	12 March 1994		~~11~~ 9 (Note: Two songs were disqualified prior to the competition: "Oi oi oi" performed by Alena Apina was disqualified after being performed on Russian TV channel 2x2 prior to the competition, thereby violating the rules of the national final and "Kogda vernus v Rossiyu" performed by Vika Tsiganova, which was withdrawn after Tsiganova wanted to change her contest song, which was not allowed by the rules.)	1	Youddiph	Nogu Svelo	Andrey Misin
1995	30 April 1995		8	1	Oksana Pavlovskaya and Viktoria Vita (Note: After the votes of the jury panel have been counted, there was a tie for the first place between "V sinem sne" performed by Oksana Pavlovskaya and "Epitaphia" performed by Viktoria Vita. The tie was to be resolved, however, the jury came to the conclusion that none of the selection participants deserves to represent Russia and decided to held an internal selection.)		No third placer (Note: There is no third place due to the fact that all other participants received 0% of the jury's votes.)
1996	2 March 1996		14	1	Andrey Kosinsky	Elena Kuzmina	Nogu Svelo
2000	19 February 2000		N/A	1	Contest cancelled (Note: Plans for the national final were abandoned by the broadcaster due to financial problems.)		
2005	4 February 2005	25 February 2005	~~30~~ 29 (Note: Sergey Mazaev was disqualified from the competition after being late for the Siberia run of the live show.)	12	Natalia Podolskaya	Dima Bilan	Anastasia Stotskaya
2008	9 March 2008		~~25~~ 27 (Note: Initially, 25 artists were supposed to participate in the selection. However, RTR decided to add 2 wildcards to the list of participants in the selection.)	1	Dima Bilan	Aleksandr Panayotov	Zhenya Otradnaya
2009	7 March 2009		~~15~~ 16 (Note: Initially, 15 songs were supposed to participate in the selection, however, on 5 March 2009, C1R announced that Anastasia Prikhodko would also participate in the national final with the song "Mamo", thereby increasing the number of participants to sixteen.)	1	Anastasia Prikhodko	Valeriya	Kvatro
2010	7 March 2010		25	1	Peter Nalitch and Friends	Oleg Bezinskih	Buranovskiye Babushki
2012	7 March 2012 (Note: Initially, the selection was supposed to take place on 26 February. However, for unknown reasons, the selection date was changed to 7 March.)		25	1	Buranovskiye Babushki	Dima Bilan & Julia Volkova	Timati & Aida Garifullina
2014	March 2014		25	1	Contest cancelled (Note: Plans for the national final were abandoned by the broadcaster due to the poor quality of submitted songs.)		
2021	8 March 2021		3	1	Manizha	#2Mashi	Therr Maitz

=== At Eurovision ===
Table key
1	Winner
2	Second place
3	Third place
X	Entry selected but did not compete

Year	Entrant	Song	Language	Final	Points	Semi	Points
1994	Youddiph	"Vechni stranik" (Вечный странник)	Russian	9	70	No semi-finals	
1996	Andrey Kosinsky	"Ya eto ya" (Я это я)	Russian	Failed to qualify (Note: In 1996, Russia failed to qualify from the audio only pre-qualification round. The official Eurovision site does not count 1996 in Russia's total list of appearances.) X		27	14
2005	Natalia Podolskaya	"Nobody Hurt No One"	English	15	57	Top 12 previous year (Note: If a country had won the previous year, they did not have to compete in Semi-finals. In addition, from 2004 to 2007, the top 10 non-Big Four countries did not have to compete in the semi-finals the following year. For example, if Germany and France placed inside the top 10, the 11th and 12th spots were advanced to next year's grand final along with all countries in the top 10.)	
2008	Dima Bilan	"Believe"	English	1	272	3	135
2009	Anastasia Prikhodko	"Mamo" (Мамо)	Russian, Ukrainian	11	91	Host country (Note: If a country had won the previous year, they did not have to compete in the semi-finals the following year.)	
2010	Peter Nalitch and Friends	"Lost and Forgotten"	English	11	90	7	74
2012	Buranovskiye Babushki	"Party for Everybody"	Udmurt, English	2	259	1	152
2021	Manizha	"Russian Woman"	Russian, English	9	204	3	225

== Venues and host(s) ==
Year	City	Channel	Venue	Semi-final host(s)	Final host(s)	Green room host(s)
1994	Moscow	RTR	Shabolovka Studios	None	Vadim Dolgachev	None
1995	Moscow	ORT	Cosmos Hotel	None	Olesya Trifonova	None
1996	Moscow	RTR	Shabolovka Studios	None	Youddiph	None
2000	Moscow	ORT	Contest cancelled			
2005	Moscow	C1R	Ostankino Studios	Yana Churikova and Andrey Malakhov		None
2008	Moscow	RTR	Akademicheskiy Concert Hall	None	Oxana Fedorova and Oskar Kuchera	None
2009	Moscow	C1R	Ostankino Studios	None	Yana Churikova and Andrey Malakhov	Dmitry Shepelev
2010	Moscow	RTR	Vladimir Nazarov's Theater	None	Oxana Fedorova and Dmitry Guberniev	None
2012	Moscow	RTR	Akademicheskiy Concert Hall	None	Olga Shelest and Mikhail Zelensky	None
2014	Moscow	RTR	Contest cancelled			
2021	Moscow	C1R	Mosfilm Studios	None	Yana Churikova	

== Voting ==
Year	Voting format	Ref.
1994	Each juror awarded 1 point to one, two or three entries.	
1995	Unknown	
1996	Each juror awarded 1 point to one, two or three entries.	
2005	Televoting	
2008	Juries and televoting each awarded 1–27 points to the entries.	
2009	First Round: Televoting; Second Round: Each juror awarded 1 point to one entry.	
2010	Combination of jury and televoting points	
2012	Combination of jury and televoting points	
2021	Televoting	

== Judges ==
Year	Judges	Ref.
1994	Bari Alibasov, Maya Gordeeva, Oleg Gusev, Klara Novikova, Yuri Saulsky, Lora Kvint, Mikhail Kuvshinov, Elena Velikanova, Sergey Podgorbunsky, Natalia Shuykina, Valery Kiselyov, Tatyana Algebraistova, Andrey Kalachikhin, Olga Suvorova, Irina Berezina, Andrey Panov, Aleksandr Danilkin	
1995	Unknown	
1996	Galina Golubova, Roman Prygunov, Irina Otieva, Yuri Yagudin, Tatyana Cherednychenko, Pavel Ovsyannikov, Alla Pugacheva, Alexey Rybnikov, Galina Masharova, Mikhail Sevastopolsky, Inga Voronovskaya, Igor Stepanov, Nadezhda Kobryzhenkova, Petr Gorovoy, Natalia Samoylova, Gennady Videnko	
2005	Konstantin Ernst, Yuri Aksyuta, Igor Matvienko, Maxim Fadeev, Viktor Drobysh, Alexey Charykov, Ilya Bachurin, Artur Gasparyan, Vladimir Polupanov, Maxim Kononenko, Larisa Havkina, Vladimir Matetsky, Maksim Dunayevsky, Larisa Dolina, Alexander Malinin, Larisa Sinelshikova	
2008	Igor Krutoy, Sergey Arhipov, Maxim Fadeev, Gennady Gokhshtein, Vladimir Matetsky	
2009	Alexander Barannikov, Dzhohan Pollyeva, Yuri Aksyuta, Kim Breitburg, Alexander Dulov, Igor Krutoy, Alexander Lunyov, Vladimir Matetsky, Ruben Oganesov, Larisa Sinelschikova, Maxim Fadeev	
2010	Andrey Demidov, Igor Krutoy, Gennady Gokhshtein, Maxim Fadeev, Sergey Arhipov	
2012	Sergey Arhipov, Igor Krutoy, Alexander Igudin, Philipp Kirkorov, Arman Davletyarov, Roman Emelyanov, Gennady Gokhshtein	

== Viewing figures ==
Year	Episode	Rating	Share	Coverage	Night rank	Week rank	Channel	Ref.
2005 (Note: Statistics for Moscow only.)	Semi-final 1	6.6%	16.0%	N/A	3	43	C1R	
2005	Semi-final 2	6.4%	14.9%	N/A	6	48	C1R	
2005	Semi-final 3	5.5%	13.1%	N/A	11	66	C1R	
2005	Final	9.5%	20.6%	N/A	2	19	C1R	
2008	Final	4.1%	12.7%	N/A	10	60	RTR	
2010	Final	5.1%	15.6%	N/A	10	44	RTR	
2012	Final	3.1%	10.1%	N/A	12	78	RTR	
2021	Final	3.9%	12.5%	10.5%	5	14	C1R	

== See also ==
- Russia in the Eurovision Song Contest
