= Russia in the Eurovision Song Contest 2021 =

- Eurovision Song Contest 2021
- Participating broadcaster: Channel One Russia (C1R)
- Country: Russia
- Selection process: Evrovidenie 2021
- Selection date: 8 March 2021

Competing entry
- Song: "Russian Woman"
- Artist: Manizha
- Songwriters: Ori Avni; Ori Kaplan; Manizha Sanghin

Placement
- Semi-final result: Qualified (3rd, 225 points)
- Final result: 9th, 204 points

Participation chronology

Russia was represented at the Eurovision Song Contest 2021 with the song "Russian Woman", written by Manizha Sanghin, Ori Avni, and Ori Kaplan, and performed by Manizha herself. The Russian participating broadcaster, Channel One Russia (C1R), organised a national final to determine its representative for the contest.

As of 2026, this was Russia's final entry in the contest, before the country was excluded the following year due to its invasion of Ukraine.

== Background ==
Prior to the 2021 contest, Russia had participated in the Eurovision Song Contest 22 times since its first entry in 1994. Russia had won the contest on one occasion in 2008 with the song "Believe" performed by Dima Bilan. In 2016, Russia finished third with the song "You Are the Only One" performed by Sergey Lazarev, who would later return to represent his country again in 2019 with the song "Scream", also finishing in third place. In 2020, the band Little Big was set to represent Russia with the song "Uno" before the contest's cancellation.

== Before Eurovision ==
=== Early selection plans ===
On 8 May 2020, during an episode of Eurovisioncalls with Little Big as guests, Little Big's members Ilya Prusikin and Sonya Tayurskaya announced that they would submit several songs to Channel One and would be happy to be invited to participate again, however C1R decided to choose a new representative via a national final and on 2 March 2021, it was announced that a national final would be held with several, at that time, unknown candidates. On 3 March 2021, tabloid super.ru leaked a shortlist of candidates for the Russian national final and stated in an article with the list of candidates that producer Yana Rudkovskaya criticized the idea with a new selection initiated by Channel One, saying that it would be worthwhile to send Little Big again, and that there is still a chance that Little Big will represent Russia.

=== National final ===
The Russian national final took place on 8 March 2021 at the Mosfilm Studios in Moscow and hosted by Yana Churikova. Three artists and songs participated and the winner was selected through a public televote. The show was broadcast Channel One as well as online via the broadcaster's website 1tv.ru. The show had a market share of 12.5%, making it the fifth most popular show of the evening and the fourteenth most popular show of the week.

==== Competing artists ====
For the contest, selection committee of Channel One shortlisted nine artists, and asked them to submit the unreleased songs for consideration. Committee then listened to the received submissions and selected 3 entries for the national final. Selected artists and the competing entries for the contest were officially presented on the evening of the selection itself, however, the names of participants were leaked via Instagram two hours before the show. Among the competing artists were Maria Zaytseva from #2Mashi (2005 and 2008 Russian national selection participant as part of A-Sortie) and Victoria Zhuk from Therr Maitz (2010 Russian national selection participant as part of Los Devchatos).

Known shortlisted acts
- Aleksandr Panayotov
- Cream Soda
- Egor Kreed
- Manizha
- Morgenshtern
- Niletto
- Therr Maitz
- Zivert
- #2Mashi

==== Final ====
The final took place on 8 March 2021. Three entries competed and the winner, "Russian Woman" performed by Manizha, was selected exclusively through a public televote. In addition to the performances of the competing entries, 2020 Russian Eurovision entrants Little Big performed "Uno", 1995 Russian Eurovision entrant Philipp Kirkorov performed a revamped version of "Kolybelnaya dlya vulkana", 2015 Russian Eurovision entrant Polina Gagarina performed "Million golosov", and 2008 Eurovision winner for Russia Dima Bilan performed "Believe" as guests.

Final – 8 March 2021
R/O	Artist	Song	Songwriter(s)	Televote	Place
1	Therr Maitz	"Future Is Bright"	Anton Belyaev, Victoria Zhuk	24.6%	3
2	#2Mashi	"Bitter Words"	Maria Zaytseva, Maria Sheykh	35.7%	2
3	Manizha	"Russkaya zhenshchina" (Русская женщина)	Manizha Sanghin, Ori Avni, Ori Kaplan	39.7%	1

== At Eurovision ==
According to Eurovision rules, all nations with the exceptions of the host country and the "Big Five" (France, Germany, Italy, Spain and the United Kingdom) are required to qualify from one of two semi-finals in order to compete in the final; the top ten countries from each semi-final progress to the final. The European Broadcasting Union (EBU) split up the competing countries into six different pots based on voting patterns from previous contests, with countries with favourable voting histories put into the same pot. For the 2021 contest, the semi-final allocation draw held for 2020 which was held on 28 January 2020, will be used. Russia was placed into the first semi-final, which was held on 18 May 2021, and was scheduled to perform in the first half of the show.

Once all the competing songs for the 2021 contest had been released, the running order for the semi-finals was decided by the shows' producers rather than through another draw, so that similar songs were not placed next to each other. Russia was set to perform in position 3, following the entry from Slovenia and preceding the entry from Sweden.

Russia performed fifth in the grand final on 22 May 2021, following Belgium and preceding Malta. At the close of voting it finished on ninth place, receiving 204 points: 100 points from televoting and 104 points from juries.

=== Voting ===
Voting during the three shows involved each country awarding two sets of points from 1–8, 10 and 12: one from their professional jury and the other from televoting. Each nation's jury consisted of five music industry professionals who are citizens of the country they represent, with a diversity in gender and age represented. The judges assess each entry based on the performances during the second Dress Rehearsal of each show, which takes place the night before each live show, against a set of criteria including: vocal capacity; the stage performance; the song's composition and originality; and the overall impression by the act. Jury members may only take part in panel once every three years, and are obliged to confirm that they are not connected to any of the participating acts in a way that would impact their ability to vote impartially. Jury members should also vote independently, with no discussion of their vote permitted with other jury members. The exact composition of the professional jury, and the results of each country's jury and televoting were released after the grand final; the individual results from each jury member were also released in an anonymised form.

==== Points awarded to Russia ====
Points awarded to Russia (Semi-final 1)
Score	Televote	Jury
12 points	Israel	Azerbaijan; Belgium; Netherlands
10 points	Croatia	Slovenia
8 points	Azerbaijan; Lithuania; North Macedonia	Croatia; Cyprus; Ireland
7 points	Australia; Cyprus; Italy; Slovenia	Australia; Germany; North Macedonia
6 points	Germany; Ukraine	Israel; Sweden
5 points	Netherlands; Romania	Italy; Romania
4 points	Norway	
3 points	Sweden	Norway
2 points	Belgium; Malta	
1 point	Ireland	Malta

Points awarded to Russia (Final)
Score	Televote	Jury
12 points	Moldova	Azerbaijan
10 points	Israel; Latvia	France; Moldova; Portugal
8 points		Netherlands; Slovenia
7 points	Bulgaria; Italy	Belgium; Israel
6 points	Azerbaijan; Estonia; Serbia	Cyprus
5 points	Czech Republic; Germany	
4 points	Georgia; Lithuania; Ukraine	Croatia; Finland
3 points	Croatia; Cyprus	Sweden; Switzerland
2 points	Poland	Czech Republic; Germany; Greece; Iceland
1 point	Finland; Greece; North Macedonia; Portugal; San Marino; Slovenia	Australia; Latvia; North Macedonia; Poland

==== Points awarded by Russia ====
Points awarded by Russia (Semi-final 1)
Score	Televote	Jury
12 points	Ukraine	Malta
10 points	Azerbaijan	Israel
8 points	Malta	Cyprus
7 points	Lithuania	Sweden
6 points	Norway	Belgium
5 points	Cyprus	Ukraine
4 points	Israel	Azerbaijan
3 points	Belgium	Croatia
2 points	Sweden	Lithuania
1 point	Australia	Australia

Points awarded by Russia (Final)
Score	Televote	Jury
12 points	Cyprus	Moldova
10 points	Italy	Italy
8 points	Finland	Azerbaijan
7 points	Ukraine	Greece
6 points	France	Bulgaria
5 points	Switzerland	Israel
4 points	Azerbaijan	Malta
3 points	Moldova	Belgium
2 points	Lithuania	Cyprus
1 point	Iceland	Switzerland

==== Detailed voting results ====
The following members comprised the Russian jury:

- Dina Garipova
- Leonid Gutkin
- Leonid Rudenko
- Alla Sigalova
- Julia Volkova

Detailed voting results from Russia (Semi-final 1)
R/O	Country	Jury							Televote	
R/O	Country	Juror A	Juror B	Juror C	Juror D	Juror E	Rank	Points	Rank	Points
01	Lithuania	8	7	10	6	7	9	2	4	7
02	Slovenia	3	11	12	15	13	11		14	
03	Russia									
04	Sweden	1	6	4	14	8	4	7	9	2
05	Australia	15	8	3	13	10	10	1	10	1
06	North Macedonia	9	14	15	9	12	14		15	
07	Ireland	13	12	9	7	11	12		13	
08	Cyprus	4	1	6	4	2	3	8	6	5
09	Norway	12	10	14	8	14	13		5	6
10	Croatia	11	9	7	5	5	8	3	12	
11	Belgium	10	3	1	11	9	5	6	8	3
12	Israel	2	4	5	1	3	2	10	7	4
13	Romania	14	15	13	10	15	15		11	
14	Azerbaijan	7	5	11	12	4	7	4	2	10
15	Ukraine	6	13	8	2	6	6	5	1	12
16	Malta	5	2	2	3	1	1	12	3	8

Detailed voting results from Russia (Final)
R/O	Country	Jury							Televote	
R/O	Country	Juror A	Juror B	Juror C	Juror D	Juror E	Rank	Points	Rank	Points
01	Cyprus	25	6	14	8	7	9	2	1	12
02	Albania	16	15	23	6	14	12		18	
03	Israel	4	4	10	4	6	6	5	19	
04	Belgium	9	13	4	22	9	8	3	16	
05	Russia									
06	Malta	5	7	7	3	10	7	4	13	
07	Portugal	20	12	9	20	15	15		22	
08	Serbia	23	16	24	17	16	23		17	
09	United Kingdom	21	20	16	9	25	17		25	
10	Greece	7	3	3	10	2	4	7	15	
11	Switzerland	24	10	5	11	21	10	1	6	5
12	Iceland	22	19	11	18	13	16		10	1
13	Spain	19	21	21	19	19	25		23	
14	Moldova	2	2	1	1	1	1	12	8	3
15	Germany	8	25	19	25	24	18		14	
16	Finland	13	11	20	12	11	14		3	8
17	Bulgaria	10	8	6	2	3	5	6	20	
18	Lithuania	15	18	15	23	20	22		9	2
19	Ukraine	12	24	13	13	8	13		4	7
20	France	18	14	18	16	17	20		5	6
21	Azerbaijan	3	1	8	5	4	3	8	7	4
22	Norway	17	23	25	14	22	24		11	
23	Netherlands	14	17	17	15	23	21		24	
24	Italy	1	5	2	7	5	2	10	2	10
25	Sweden	6	9	12	21	18	11		12	
26	San Marino	11	22	22	24	12	19		21	
