= Russia in the Eurovision Song Contest =

- Eurovision Song Contest
- Former participating broadcaster: All-Russia State Television and Radio Broadcasting Company (RTR); Channel One Russia (C1R)

Participation summary
- Appearances: 23 (22 finals)
- First appearance: 1994
- Last appearance: 2021
- Highest placement: 1st: 2008
- Host: 2009
- Participation history: 1994; 1995; ~~1996~~; 1997; 1998; 1999; 2000; 2001; 2002; 2003; 2004; 2005; 2006; 2007; 2008; 2009; 2010; 2011; 2012; 2013; 2014; 2015; 2016; ~~2017~~; 2018; 2019; ~~2020~~; 2021; ~~2022~~; 2023 – 2026

Related articles
- Evrovidenie
- Russia's page at Eurovision.com
- For the most recent participation see Russia in the Eurovision Song Contest 2021

Russia was represented at the Eurovision Song Contest 23 times from its debut in 1994 to 2021. Russia won the 2008 contest with Dima Bilan performing the song "Believe". In 2018, the country failed to qualify for the final for the first and as of 2026 the only time in its history. The Russian entry was chosen through both internal selections and a televised national final titled Evrovidenie.

Following their exclusion from the 2022 contest due to the 2022 Russian invasion of Ukraine, on 26 February 2022, the Russian broadcasters RTR and Channel One announced that they would suspend their membership in the European Broadcasting Union (EBU). The EBU made the suspension effective on 26 May 2022, preventing Russia from participating in further Eurovision events unless its membership is resumed.

== Contest history ==
Russia debuted in the 1994 contest after becoming a member of the EBU. The country had previously considered to debut at the Eurovision Song Contest in 1993, but the planned entry failed to materialize.

Russia won their first and so far only contest in 2008, when Dima Bilan, participating for the second time in the contest, won with the song "Believe", bringing the contest to Russia for 2009. Russia came second at four contests; in 2000 with the song "Solo" performed by Alsou, in 2006 with Dima Bilan's song "Never Let You Go", in 2012 with the song "Party for Everybody" performed by Buranovskiye Babushki, and in 2015 with Polina Gagarina's song "A Million Voices". They also achieved four third-place finishes; in 2003 with t.A.T.u's song "Ne ver', ne boysia", Serebro in 2007 with their entry "Song #1", and in 2016 as well as 2019 with Sergey Lazarev's entries "You Are the Only One" and "Scream" respectively.

Russia has failed to qualify for the final on two occasions. In 1996, Russia's entry was Andrey Kosinsky with the song "Ya eto ya", but he scored an insufficient number of points in a special qualifying round, while in 2018 Yulia Samoylova, who represented the country with the song "I Won't Break", failed to qualify from the televised second semi-final.

In 1998, because Russia did not participate in the contest (due to lower average scores in participating in previous competitions), Russia refused to broadcast the competition and the European Broadcasting Union in return forbade the country to participate the following year. According to unconfirmed information, Russia intended to send Tatyana Ovsienko with the song "Solntse moyo" (My Sun), which turned out to be a false rumour as the song was officially released in mid-1997 on Tatyana's album "Za Rozovym morem". Tatyana herself, during an interview, said that she did not go to Eurovision because she was "Either afraid or not very sure, besides, I knew that there were stronger guys and girls, and I thought that I would still have time [to go to Eurovision]."

Russia was the most successful country in Eurovision between 2000 and 2009, with one win, two-second places, and two third places. However, in 2010 they finished 11th, and in 2011 they were 16th, which was the worst placing for Russia since 1995. Interest in the competition fell, but in 2012, Buranovskiye Babushki finished in second place, increasing Russia's interest in the show. Sergey Lazarev holds the record of the highest score of any Russian contestant, who finished third in 2016 with 491 points.

In February 2019, Sergey Lazarev was once again confirmed as the Russian representative for the 2019 contest, becoming the second returning artist in Russia's Eurovision history after Dima Bilan, who participated in 2006 and 2008 respectively. This time he represented his country with the song "Scream", with which he brought Russia back to the final for the first time since 2016 and achieved the country's 10th top 5 result, by finishing third once again.

For the 2021 contest, Russia opted to return to a national selection, after Little Big declined to return following their intended participation in the later-cancelled 2020 contest with "Uno". "Russian Woman" performed by Manizha emerged as the winner of the selection, which then went on to finish in 9th place in the final.

Russia had originally planned to participate in the 2022 contest, but was excluded from participating by the EBU due to the 2022 Russian invasion of Ukraine. In response, the Russian broadcasters VGTRK and Channel One announced their intention to suspend their membership in the EBU. The suspension was made effective by the EBU on 26 May, preventing Russia from participating in further Eurovision events unless its membership is resumed.

== Broadcast ==
The contest was broadcast irregularly on two different public state channels in Russia, both EBU members: in 1994 and 1996 it was broadcast on Russia-1 of RTR, while in 1995, 1997 and from 1999 to 2007, the contest was broadcast on Channel One. From 2008, there was an alternation on broadcast and selection duties, with Russia-1 on even years, and Channel One on odd years. This alternation was disrupted when Russia withdrew from the 2017 contest, after which Channel One assumed broadcast and selection duties in 2018, 2020 and 2021, and Russia-1 in 2019.

== Participation overview ==
Table key
1	First place
2	Second place
3	Third place
◇	Entry selected but did not compete

Year	Artist	Song	Language	Final	Points	Semi	Points
1994	Youddiph	"Vechny strannik" (Note: "Vechny strannik" was titled "Eternal Wanderer" in the on-screen credits.) (Вечный странник)	Russian	9	70	No semi-finals	
1995	Philipp Kirkorov	"Kolybelnaya dlya vulkana" (Колыбельная для вулкана)	Russian	17	17	No semi-finals	
1996	Andrey Kosinsky ◇	"Ya eto ya" (Я это я) ◇	Russian ◇	Failed to qualify (Note: In order to reduce the number of participating countries at the 1996 event a qualifying round was held among all countries except the hosts. Russia failed to progress from this round; entries which failed to progress have subsequently been discounted by the EBU and do not feature as part of the countries' list of appearances.)		26	14
1997	Alla Pugacheva	"Primadonna" (Примадонна)	Russian	15	33	No semi-finals	
2000	Alsou	"Solo"	English	2	155	No semi-finals	
2001	Mumiy Troll	"Lady Alpine Blue"	English	12	37	No semi-finals	
2002	Prime Minister	"Northern Girl"	English	10	55	No semi-finals	
2003	t.A.T.u.	"Ne ver', ne boysia" (Не верь, не бойся)	Russian	3	164	No semi-finals	
2004	Julia Savicheva	"Believe Me"	English	11	67	Top 11 in 2003 contest (Note: If a country had won the previous year, they did not have to compete in Semi-finals. In addition, from 2004 to 2007, the top 10 non-Big Four countries did not have to compete in the semi-finals the following year. For example, if Germany and France placed inside the top 10, the 11th and 12th spots were advanced to next year's grand final along with all countries in the top 10.)	
2005	Natalia Podolskaya	"Nobody Hurt No One"	English	15	57	Top 12 in 2004 final	
2006	Dima Bilan	"Never Let You Go"	English	2	248	3	217
2007	Serebro	"Song #1"	English	3	207	Top 10 in 2006 final	
2008	Dima Bilan	"Believe"	English	1	272	3	135
2009	Anastasia Prikhodko	"Mamo" (Мамо)	Russian, Ukrainian	11	91	Host country	
2010	Peter Nalitch and Friends	"Lost and Forgotten"	English	11	90	7	74
2011	Alexey Vorobyov	"Get You"	English, Russian	16	77	9	64
2012	Buranovskiye Babushki	"Party for Everybody"	Udmurt, English	2	259	1	152
2013	Dina Garipova	"What If"	English	5	174	2	156
2014	Tolmachevy Sisters	"Shine"	English	7	89	6	63
2015	Polina Gagarina	"A Million Voices"	English	2	303	1	182
2016	Sergey Lazarev	"You Are the Only One"	English	3	491	1	342
2017	Julia Samoylova ◇	"Flame Is Burning" ◇	English ◇	Withdrawn			
2018	Julia Samoylova	"I Won't Break"	English	Failed to qualify		15	65
2019	Sergey Lazarev	"Scream"	English	3	370	6	217
2020	Little Big ◇	"Uno" ◇	English, Spanish ◇	Contest cancelled (Note: The 2020 contest was cancelled due to the COVID-19 pandemic.)			
2021	Manizha	"Russian Woman"	Russian, English	9	204	3	225

== Related involvement ==
=== Conductors ===
Year	Conductor	Notes	Ref.
1994	(Russia) Lev Zemlinski		
1995	(Belarus) Mikhail Finberg		
1997	(Sweden) Rutger Gunnarsson		

=== Heads of delegation ===
Broadcaster	Year(s)	Head of delegation	Ref.
Channel One	2000–2003	Elena Arkhipova	
Channel One	2004–2021	Yuri Aksyuta	
RTR	2008–2019	Ekaterina Orlova	

=== Commentators and spokespersons ===
The contest was also aired on radio stations and alternative channels, including Radio 101, commentated by Olesya Trifonova, in 1995. From 2008 until their suspension, Channel One and Russia-1 switched roles to broadcast the contest.

Year	Channel	Commentator	Spokesperson	Ref.
1986	Programme One	Unknown	Did not participate	
1987	Programme One	Unknown	Did not participate	
1988	Programme One	Unknown	Did not participate	
1989	Programme One	Grigory Shestakov	Did not participate	
1990	Programme One	Unknown	Did not participate	
1991	Programme One	Unknown	Did not participate	
1992	RTR	Unknown	Did not participate	
1993	RTR	Unknown	Did not participate	
1994	RTR	Sergey Antipov	Irina Klenskaya	
1995	ORT (Note: Delayed broadcast on the night between May 14th and May 15th due to "internal problems at ORT".)	Olesya Trifonova	Marina Danielyan	
1996	Unknown		Did not participate	
1997	ORT	Philipp Kirkorov, Sergey Antipov	Arina Sharapova	
1998	Unknown		Did not participate	
1999	ORT	Olga Maksimova and Kolya MacCleod	Did not participate	
1999	Jewish Channel	Unknown	Did not participate	
2000	ORT	Tatyana Godunova, Aleksey Zhuravlev	Zhanna Agalakova	
2001	ORT	Alexander Anatolyevich, Konstantin Mikhailov	Larisa Verbitskaya	
2002	ORT	Yuriy Aksyuta, Yelena Batinova	Arina Sharapova	
2003	Channel One	Yuriy Aksyuta, Yelena Batinova	Yana Churikova	
2004	Channel One (Final)	Yuriy Aksyuta, Yelena Batinova	Yana Churikova	
2005	Channel One	Yuriy Aksyuta, Yelena Batinova	Yana Churikova	
2006	Channel One	Yuri Aksyuta, Tatyana Godunova	Yana Churikova	
2007	Channel One	Yuri Aksyuta, Yelena Batinova	Yana Churikova	
2008	Telekanal Rossiya, RTR Planeta	Dmitry Guberniev, Olga Shelest	Oxana Fedorova	
2009	Channel One	Yana Churikova (All shows); Aleksey Manuylov (Semi-finals); Philipp Kirkorov (Final)	Ingeborga Dapkūnaitė	
2010	Russia-1	Dmitry Guberniev, Olga Shelest	Oxana Fedorova	
2011	Channel One	Yuri Aksyuta, Yana Churikova	Dima Bilan	
2012	Russia-1	Dmitry Guberniev, Olga Shelest	Oxana Fedorova	
2013	Channel One	Yuri Aksyuta, Yana Churikova	Alsou	
2014	Russia-1	Dmitry Guberniev, Olga Shelest	Alsou	
2015	Channel One	Yuri Aksyuta, Yana Churikova	Dmitry Shepelev	
2016	Russia-1, Russia HD	Dmitry Guberniev, Ernest Mackevičius	Nyusha	
2017	No broadcast		Did not participate	
2018	Channel One (Note: Channel One aired the first semi-final on a 90-minute delay while the second semi-final and the grand final was aired live.)	Yuri Aksyuta, Yana Churikova	Alsou	
2019	Russia 1, Russia HD	Dmitry Guberniev, Olga Shelest	Ivan Bessonov	
2020	Not announced before cancellation			
2021	Channel One	Yuri Aksyuta, Yana Churikova	Polina Gagarina	
2022–2026	Suspended from broadcasting		Did not participate	

=== Costume designers ===
Year	Costume designers	Ref.
1994	Pavel Kaplevich	
2000	Maria Grachvogel	
2002	Valentin Yudashkin	

=== Viewing figures ===
Year	Region(s)	Share	Rating	Ref.
1997	All of Russia	53.8%	N/A	
2001	All of Russia	31.1%	5.5%	
2004	All of Russia	51.6%	16.1%	
2005	All of Russia	40.2%	11%	
2007	All of Russia	53.6%	17%	
2008	All of Russia	47%	8.4%	
2009	All of Russia	64.2%	17.6%	
2010	Rest of Russia	37.2%	N/A	
2010	Moscow	46.5%	N/A	
2011	Rest of Russia	33%	5.4%	
2011	Moscow	35.5%	8%	
2012	All of Russia	47.7%	12.1%	
2013	All of Russia	32.5%	6%	
2014	All of Russia	31.5%	5.2%	
2015	All of Russia	31.6%	6.8%	
2016	All of Russia	37%	6.8%	
2018	All of Russia	11.6%	2.2%	
2019	All of Russia	28.2%	4.6%	
2020 (Note: Statistics for Eurovision: Europe Shine a Light)	All of Russia	11.7%	3%	
2021	All of Russia	23.1%	3.8%	

== Hostings ==
Year	Location	Venue	Presenters	Ref.
2009	Moscow	Olympic Indoor Arena	Natalia Vodianova and Andrey Malahov (semi-finals); Alsou and Ivan Urgant (final)	

== Awards ==
=== Marcel Bezençon Awards ===
Year	Category	Song	Performer	Final	Points	Host city	Ref.
2016	Press Award	"You Are the Only One"	Sergey Lazarev	3	491	(Sweden) Stockholm	

=== Barbara Dex Award ===
Year	Performer	Host city	Ref.
2003	t.A.T.u.	(Latvia) Riga	

== Photo gallery ==
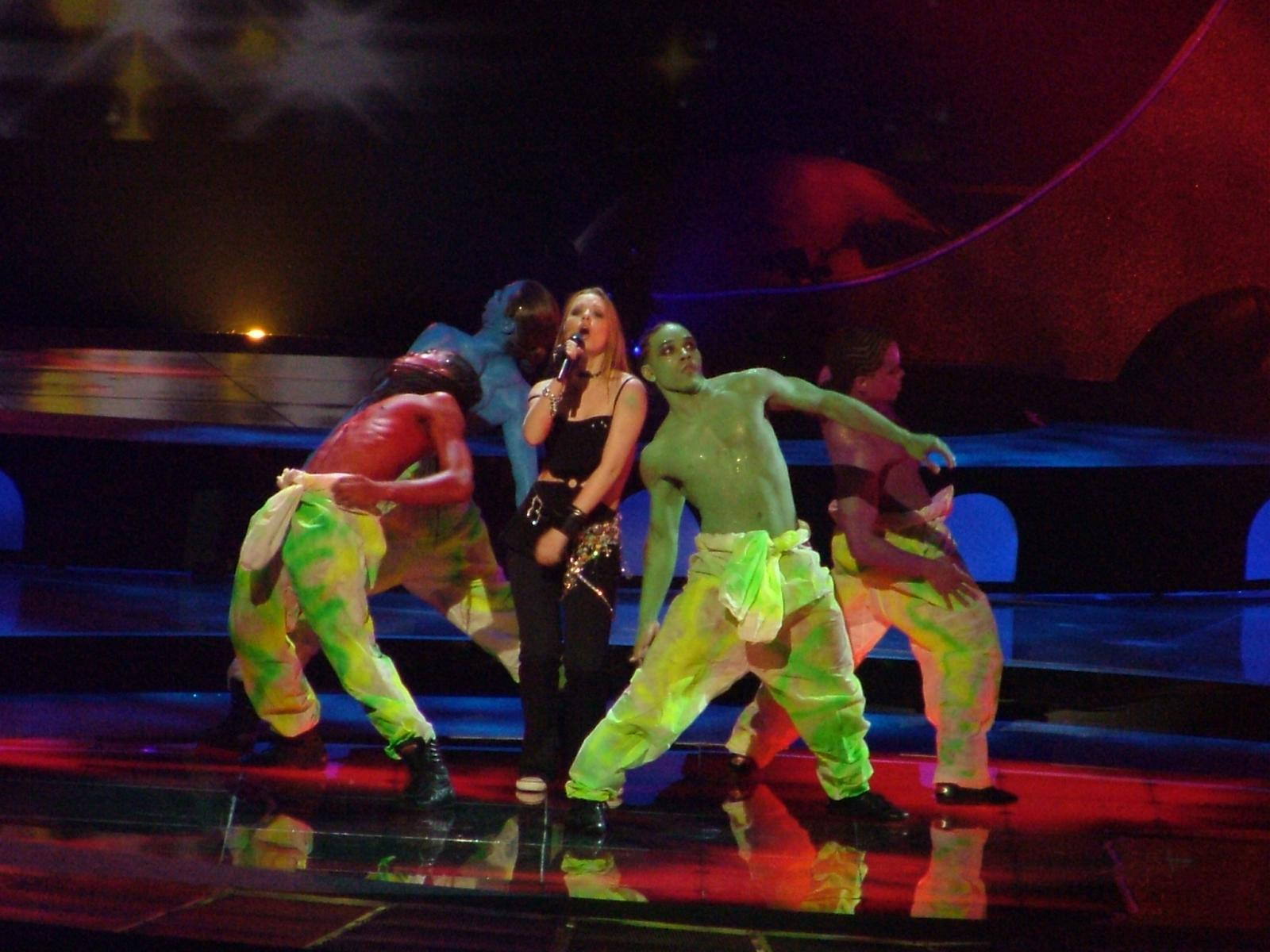
Julia Savicheva in Istanbul (2004)

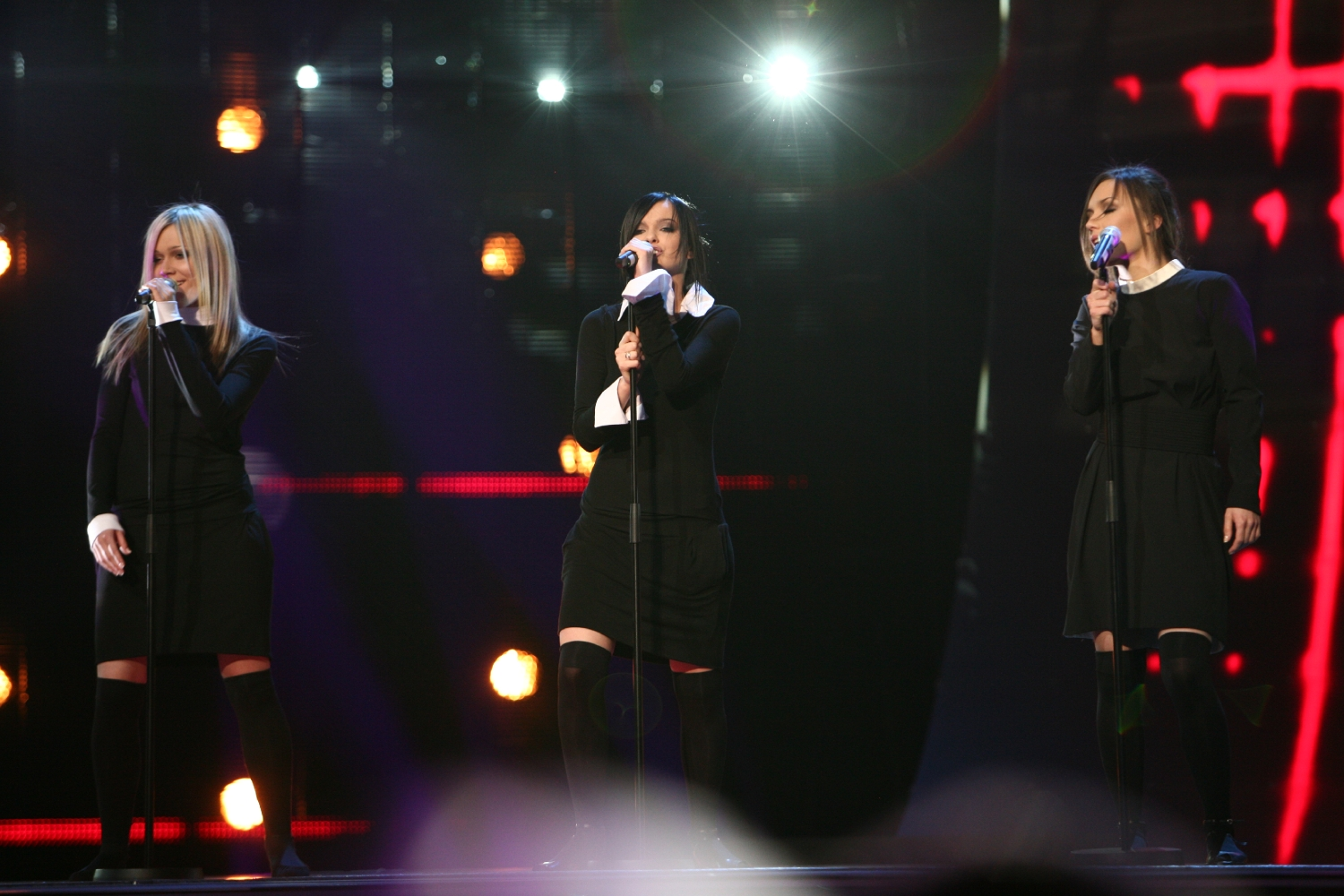
Serebro in Helsinki (2007)

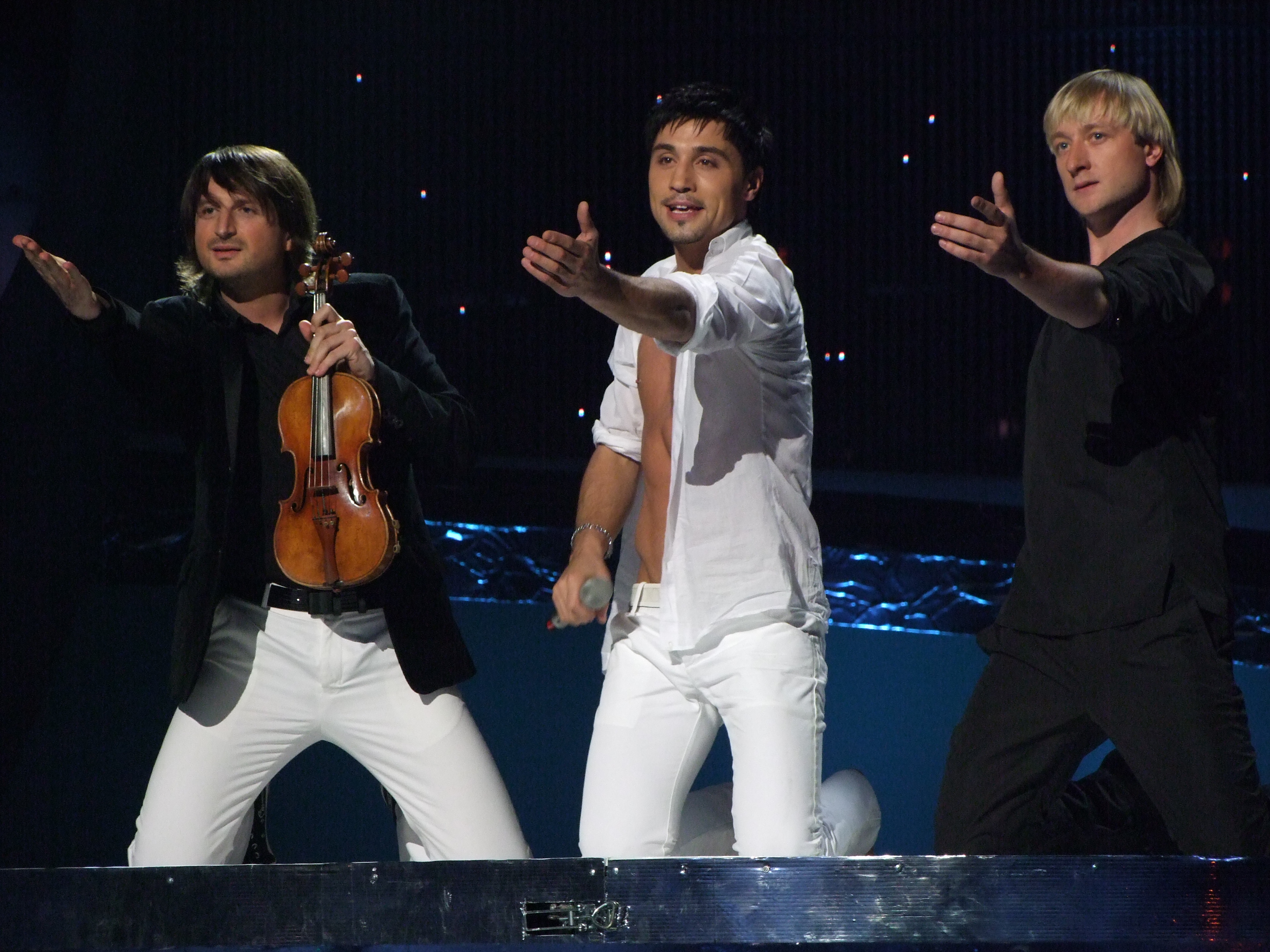
Dima Bilan in Belgrade (2008)

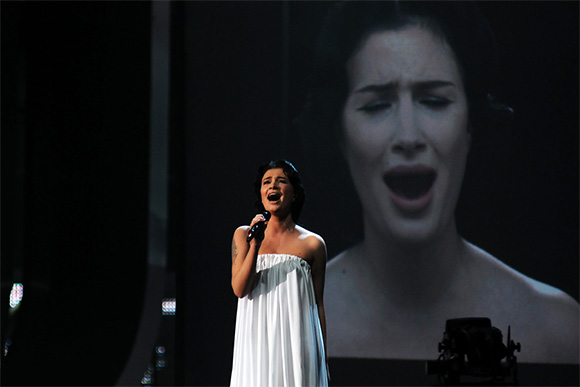
Anastasia Prikhodko in Moscow (2009)

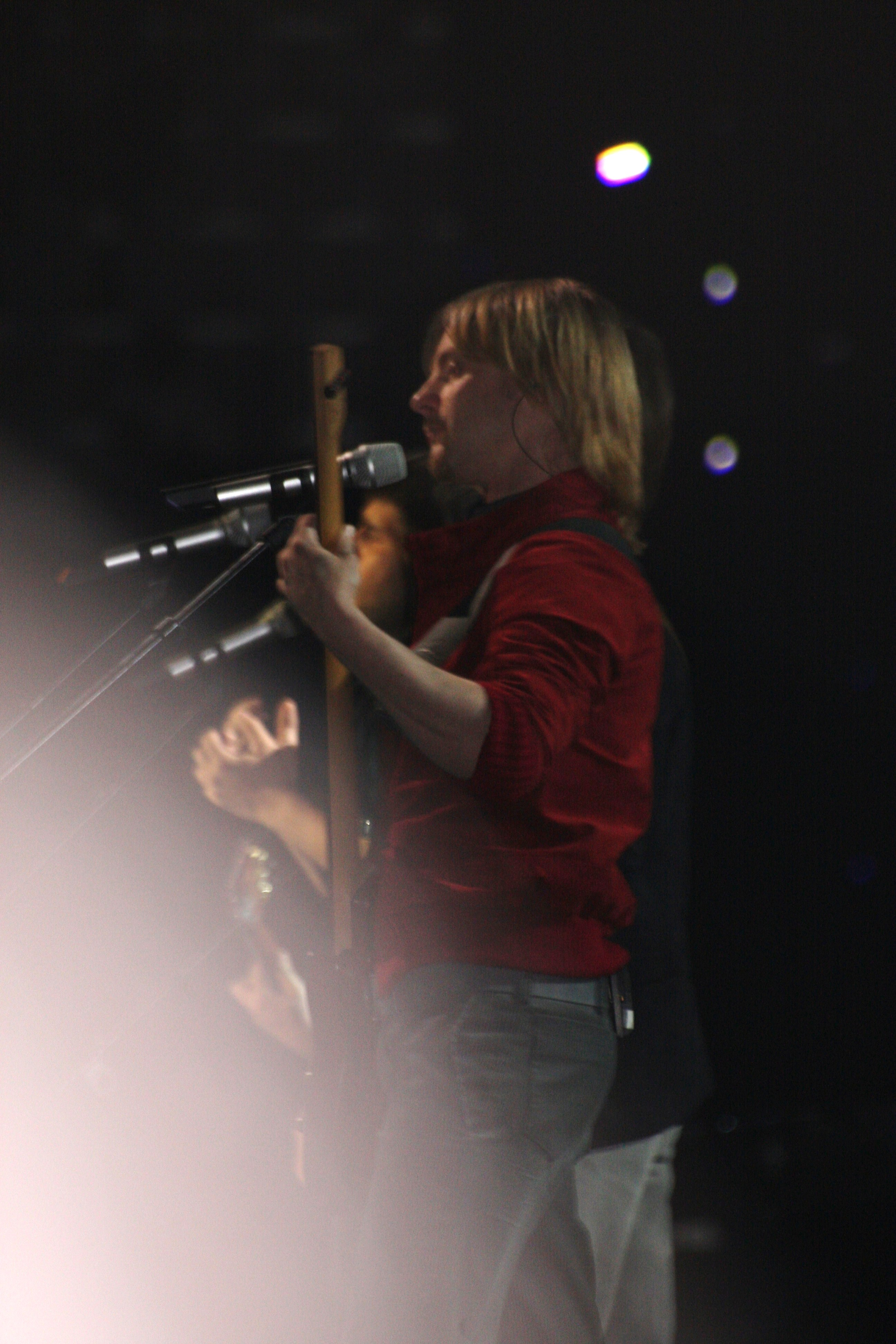
Peter Nalitch and Friends in Oslo (2010)

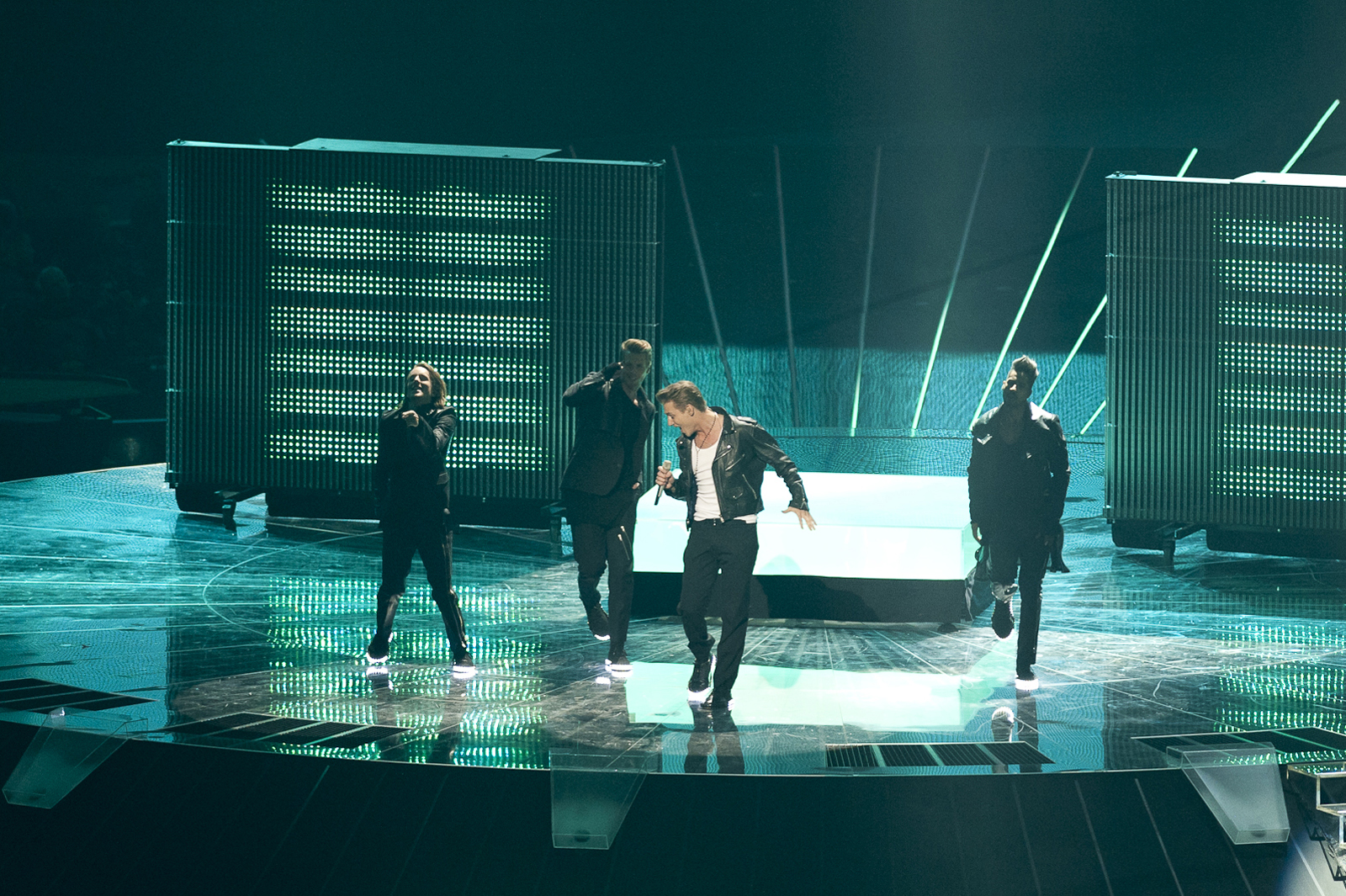
Alex Vorobyov in Düsseldorf (2011)

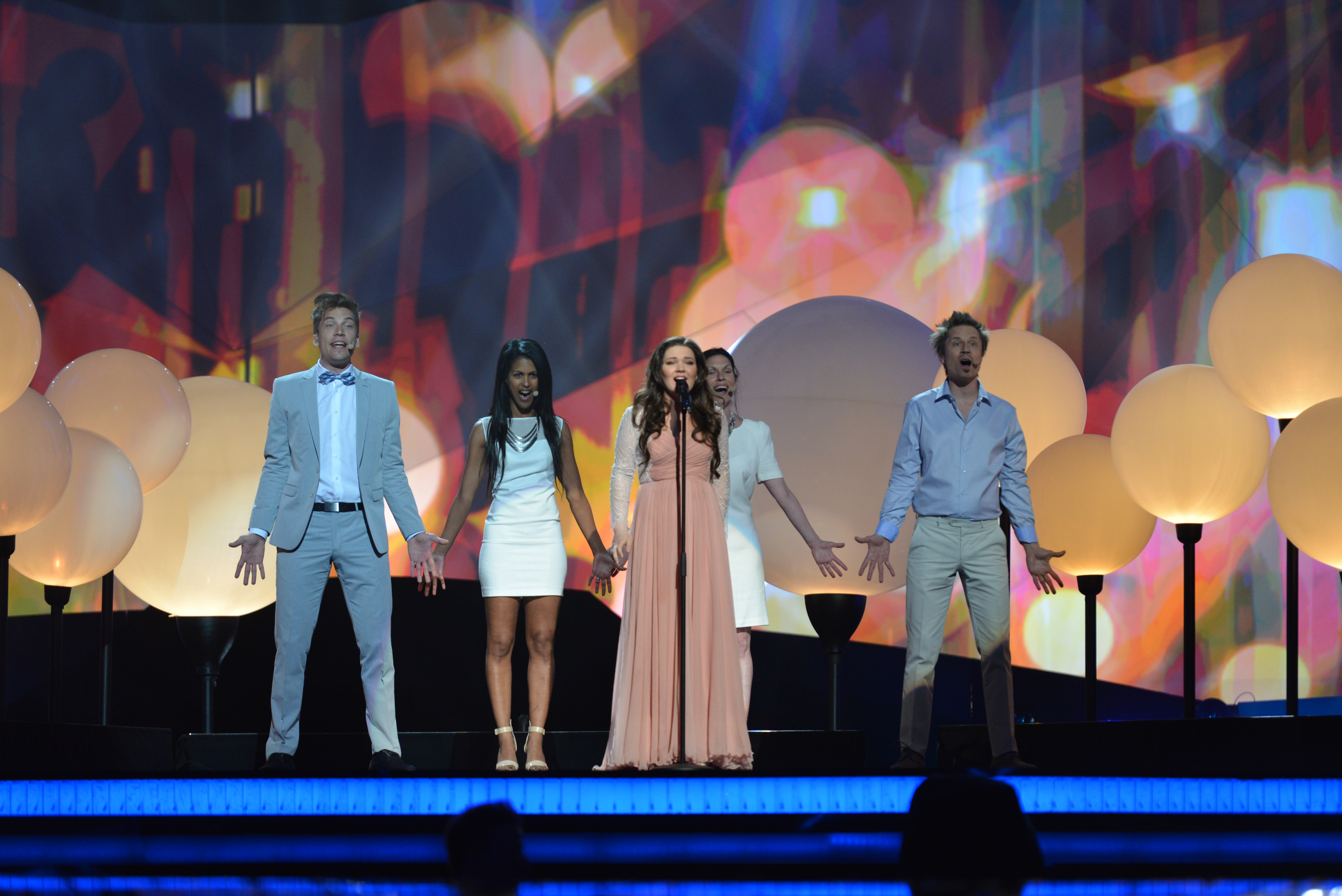
Dina Garipova in Malmö (2013)

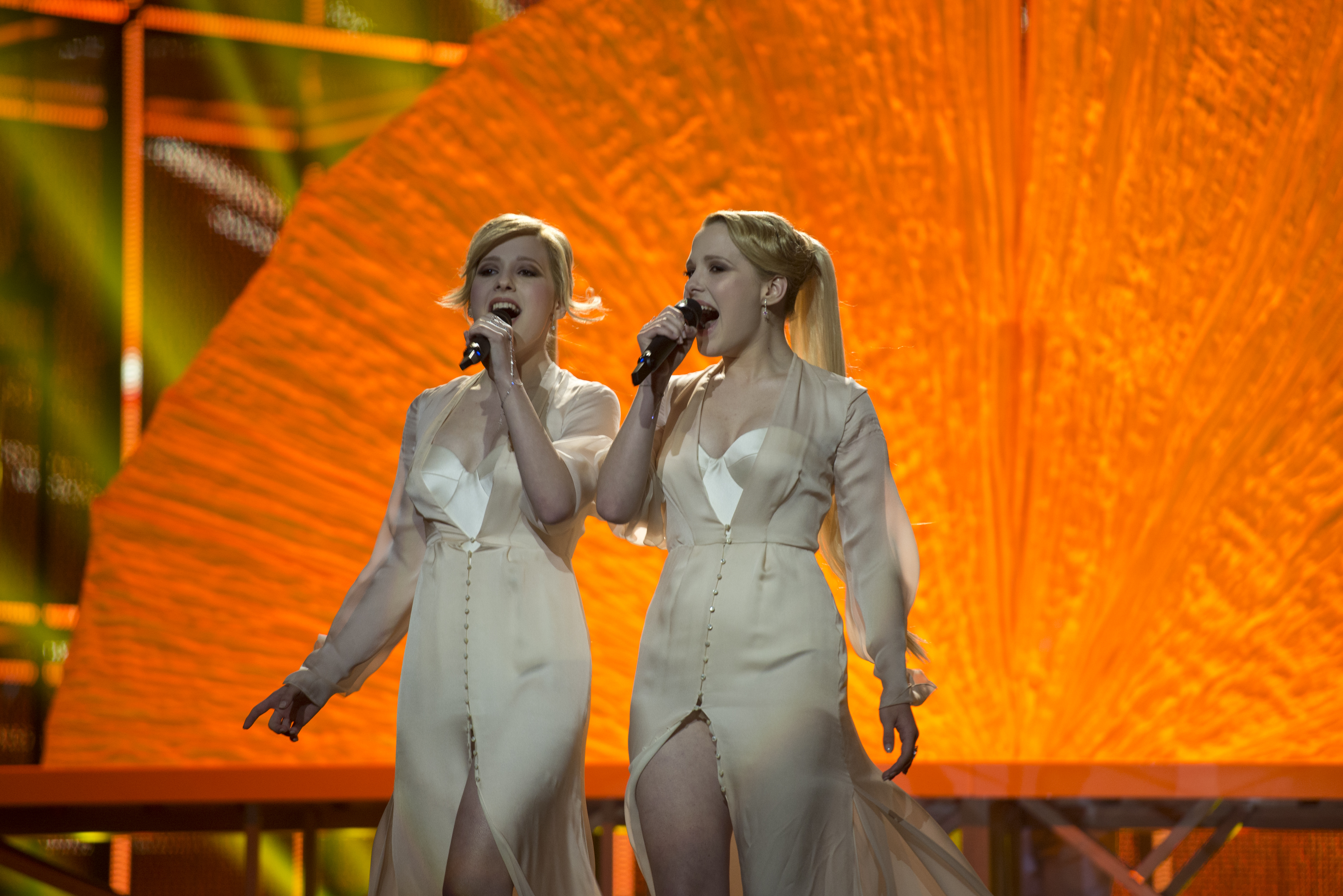
Tolmachevy Sisters in Copenhagen (2014)

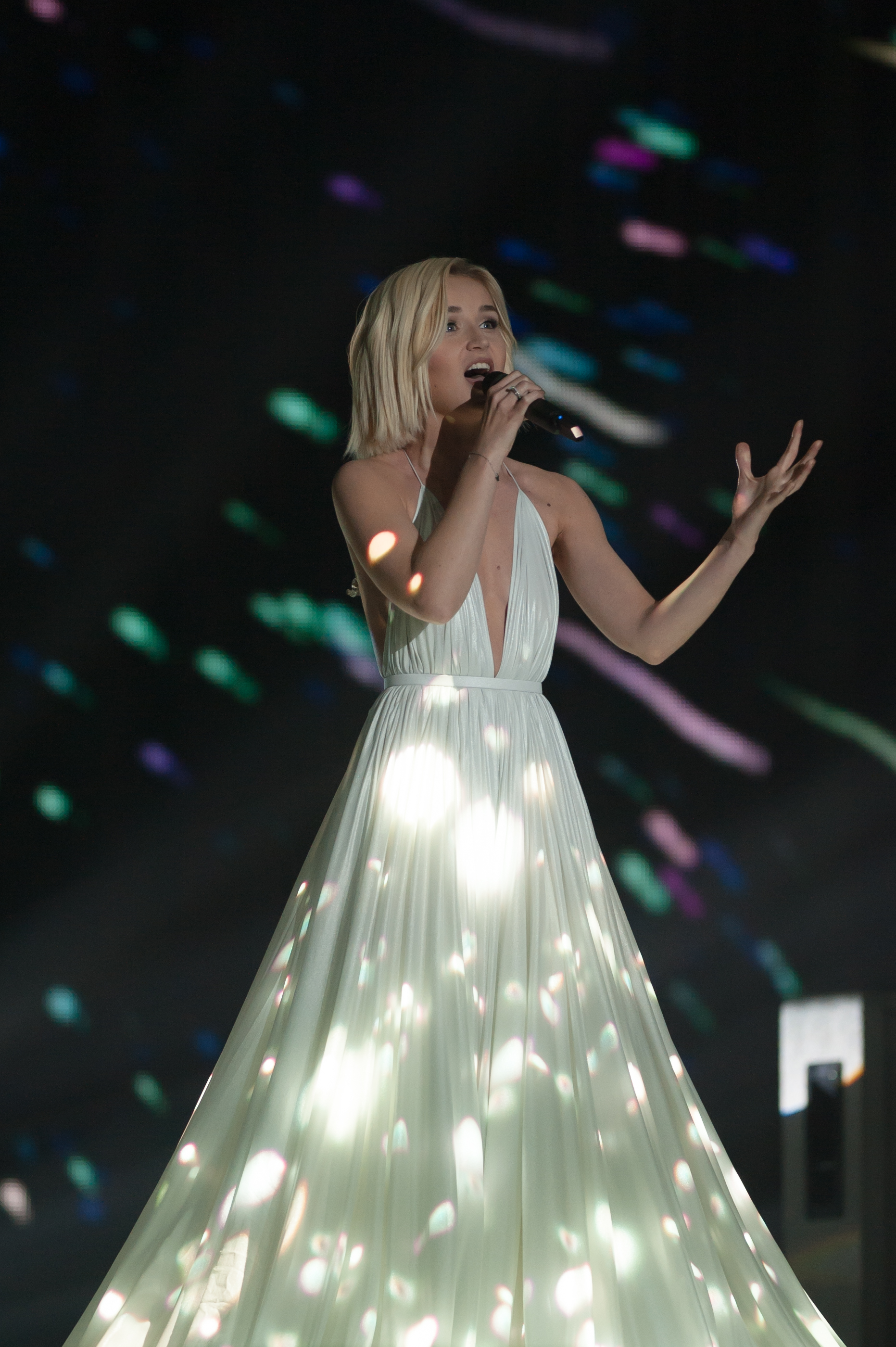
Polina Gagarina in Vienna (2015)

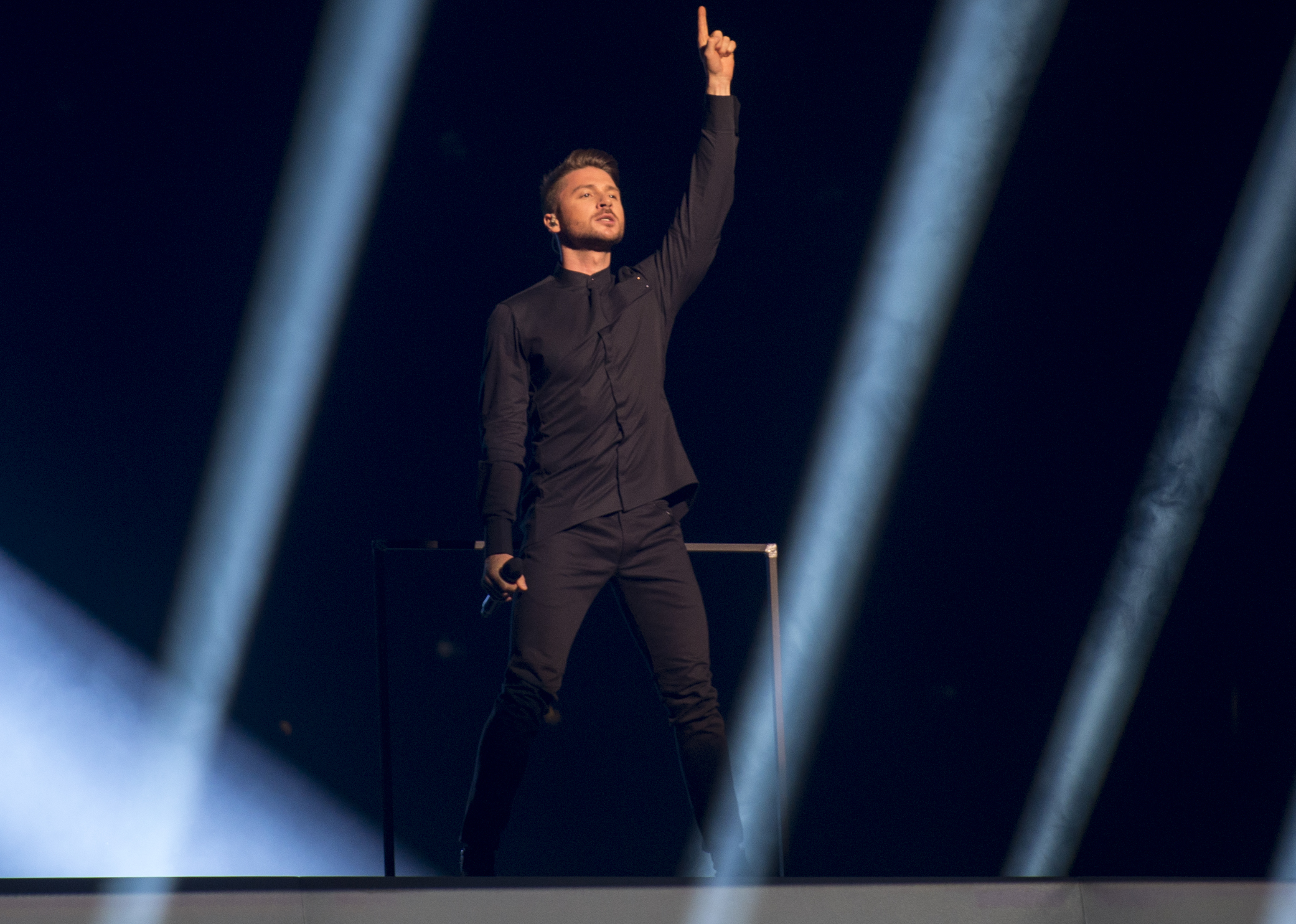
Sergey Lazarev in Stockholm (2016)

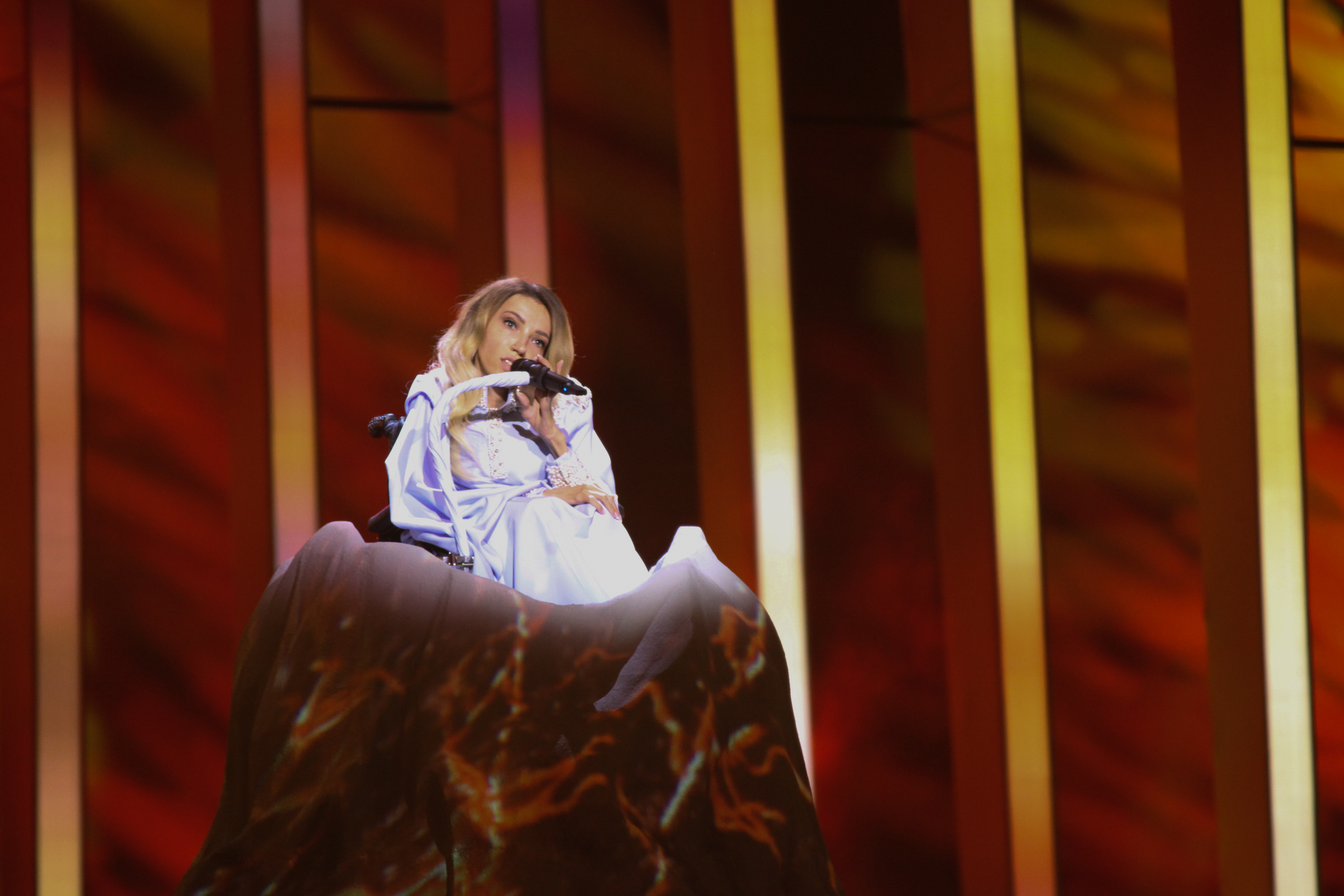
Julia Samoylova in Lisbon (2018)

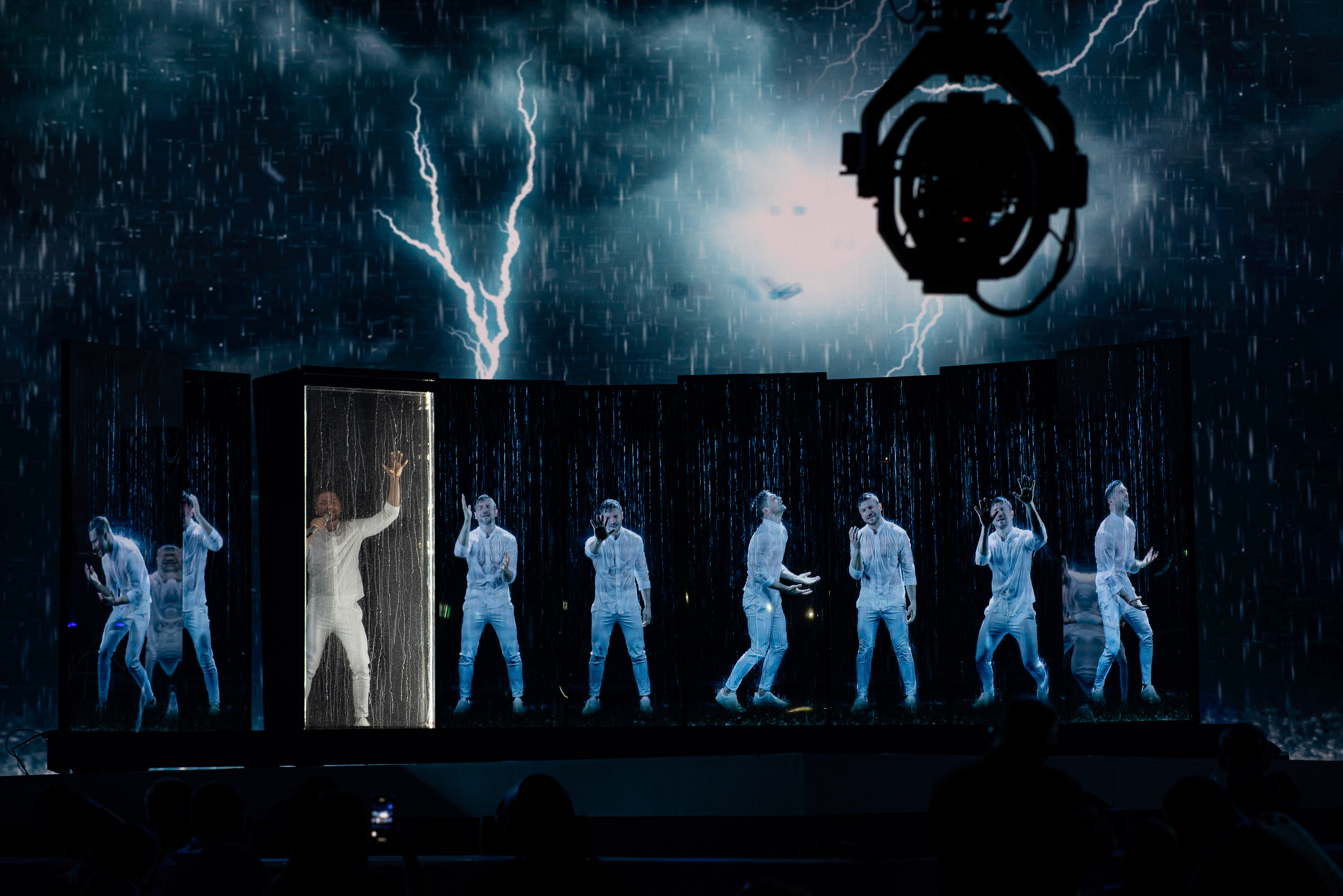
Sergey Lazarev in Tel Aviv (2019)

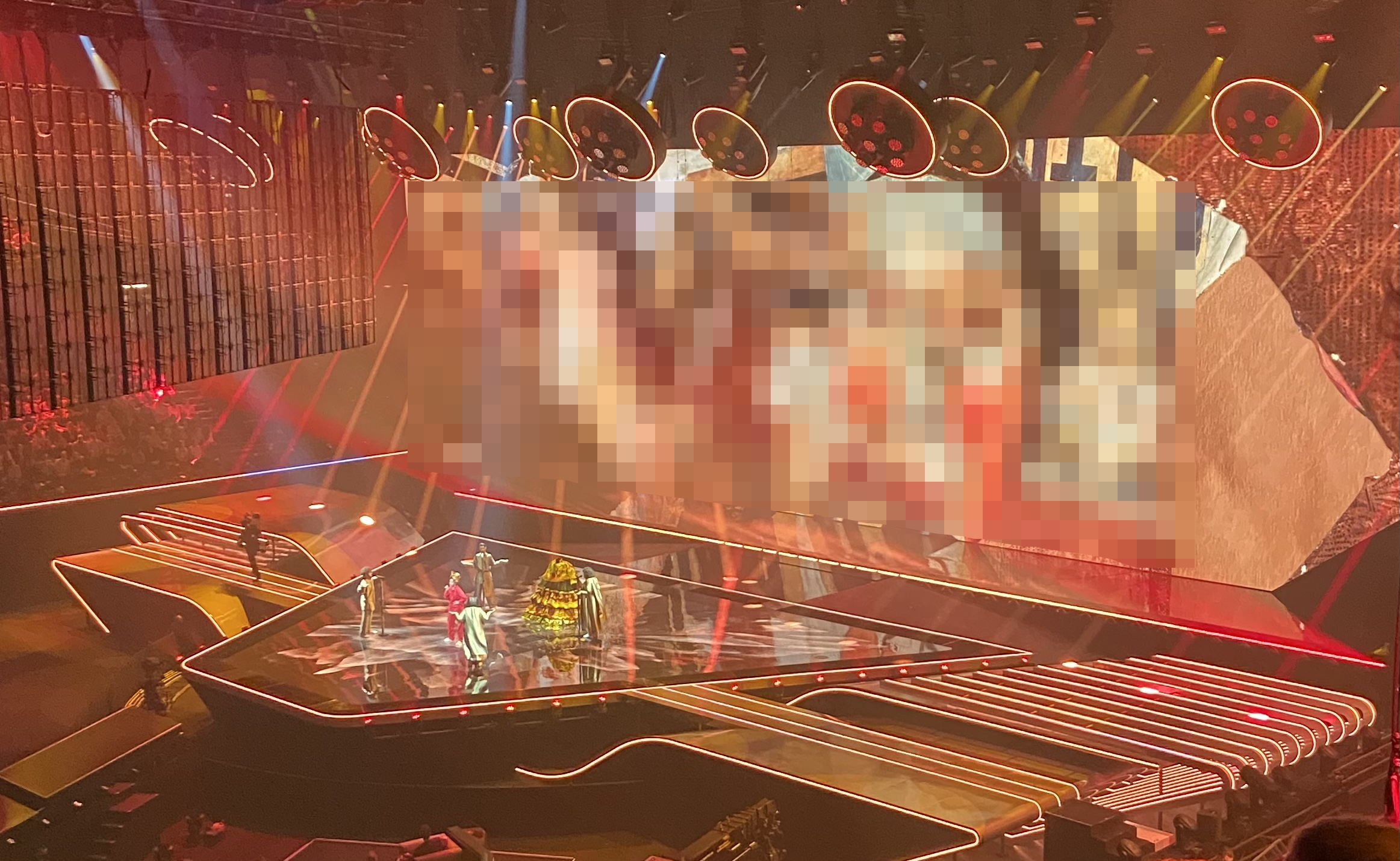
Manizha in Rotterdam (2021)

== See also ==
- Russia in the Junior Eurovision Song Contest – Junior version of the Eurovision Song Contest.
- Russia in the Intervision Song Contest – A competition formerly organized by the International Radio and Television Organisation (OIRT) from 1965 to 1980, and revived in 2025.
- Russia–Ukraine relations in the Eurovision Song Contest – Relations between the two countries in the Junior and Senior Eurovision Song Contests.
