= Russian Woman =

2021 song by Manizha

Single by Manizha
- Written: 8 March 2020
- Released: 19 March 2021
- Genre: Art pop; hip hop; folk
- Length: 2:56
- Label: Independent
- Songwriters: Manizha; Ori Avni; Ori Kaplan
- Producers: Ori Avni; Ori Kaplan

Manizha singles chronology
"Akkulista" (2021)	"Russian Woman" (2021)	"Держи Меня Земля (Hold Me Mother Earth)" (2022)

Music video
- "Russian Woman" on YouTube

Eurovision Song Contest 2021 entry
- Country: Russia
- Artist: Manizha
- Composers: Ori Avni; Ori Kaplan; Manizha
- Lyricist: Manizha

Finals performance
- Semi-final result: 3rd
- Semi-final points: 225
- Final result: 9th
- Final points: 204

Entry chronology
- ◄ "Uno" (2020)

"Russian Woman" (transliterated into Russian Cyrillic as Рашн Ԝуман, stylised in all caps), originally titled "Russkaya zhenshchina" (Русская женщина), is a song by Russian-Tajik singer Manizha, independently released as a single on 19 March 2021. The song represented Russia in the Eurovision Song Contest 2021 in Rotterdam, the Netherlands, after winning the national final Evrovidenie 2021 – Nacionalniy Otbor. To date, this is the last Russian entry in the Eurovision Song Contest, after the country was excluded from the 2022 contest.

== Background ==
"This is a song about the transformation of a woman's self-awareness over the past few centuries in Russia. A Russian woman has gone an amazing way from a peasant hut to the right to elect and be elected (one of the first in the world), from factory workshops to space flights. She has never been afraid to resist stereotypes and take responsibilities. This is the source of inspiration for the song. By coincidence I wrote it on March 8, 2020 while on tour, but for the first time I perform it a year later."

— Manizha explains the meaning behind "Russian Woman" to Eurovision.tv.

== Controversy ==
Many Russian viewers took offense to a singer of Tajik descent singing about Russian women and to the singer's activism for LGBT rights and women's rights, and left hate comments on the video and her Instagram account, demanding that she drop out of Eurovision. Yelena Drapeko, First Deputy Chairman of the State Duma Committee on Culture, suggested banning Manizha from performing in Eurovision under the Russian flag, commenting also that Eurovision offered no cultural value and was too politicized and pro-LGBT.

== Eurovision Song Contest ==
The song was selected to represent Russia in the Eurovision Song Contest 2021, after Manizha was selected through Evrovidenie 2021 – Nacionalniy Otbor. The semi-finals of the 2021 contest featured the same line-up of countries as determined by the draw for the 2020 contest's semi-finals. Russia was placed into the first semi-final, held on 18 May 2021, and passed into finals. The final was held on 22 May 2021, and the song got 9th place with 204 points.

== Charts ==
Chart performance for "Russian Woman"
Chart (2021)	Peak position
Belgium (Ultratip Bubbling Under Flanders)	32
Greece (IFPI)	51
Iceland (Tónlistinn)	40
Lithuania (AGATA)	12
Netherlands (Single Top 100)	81
Sweden (Sverigetopplistan)	84

== Release history ==
Release history for "Russian Woman"
Region	Date	Format(s)	Label	References
Various	19 March 2021	Digital download; streaming	Independent	
