= Believe (Dima Bilan song) =

2008 song by Dima Bilan

Single by Dima Bilan

from the album Protiv pravil and Believe
- Released: 26 May 2008
- Recorded: 2008
- Genre: R&B; pop
- Length: 3:54
- Label: Universal Music; EMI; Misteriya Zvuka
- Songwriters: Jim Beanz; Dima Bilan
- Producers: Jim Beanz; Timbaland

Music video
- "Believe" on YouTube

Alternative cover
- Belgian cover for Believe

Eurovision Song Contest 2008 entry
- Country: Russia
- Artist: Dima Bilan
- With: Edvin Marton; Evgeni Plushenko
- Language: English
- Composers: Dima Bilan; Jim Beanz
- Lyricists: Dima Bilan; Jim Beanz

Finals performance
- Semi-final result: 3rd
- Semi-final points: 135
- Final result: 1st
- Final points: 272

Entry chronology
- ◄ "Song #1" (2007)
- "Mamo" (2009) ►

Official performance video
- "Believe" (Final) on YouTube

"Believe" is a song recorded by Russian singer Dima Bilan written by Jim Beanz and Bilan himself. It represented Russia in the Eurovision Song Contest 2008 held in Belgrade, resulting in the country's only ever win at the contest.

== Background ==
=== Conception ===
"Believe" was written by Dima Bilan and Jim Beanz. It was recorded by Bilan, with production by Beanz and Timbaland. He also recorded a Russian version titled "Все в твоих руках" ("All in your hands"), and a Spanish version titled "Creer".

=== National Selection ===
On 9 March 2008, "Believe" performed by Bilan competed in the fourth edition of Evrovidenie, the national final organised by Rossiya Channel (RTR) to select its song and performer for the 53rd edition of the Eurovision Song Contest. The song won the competition becoming the Russian entry –and Bilan the performer– for Eurovision. Bilan had already represented Russia at the 2006 contest, with the dark pop song "Never Let You Go", where he placed second.

=== Music video ===
Later in March 2008, a video was produced for the song. The whole team took part in the production – Dima Bilan, Evgeni Plushenko, Edvin Marton, and Yana Rudkovskaya –Dima Bilan's producer–. The action of the video starts in a hospital where a mother finds out that her son has leukaemia and needs an expensive surgery. Then the action proceeds to a bar where Bilan is watching television and finds out that a child needs help. He immediately calls his producer, Rudkovskaya, and tells her that they have to do something to raise money to help a child survive. They decide to give a charity concert with all the three participants performing. At the end of the video you can see the boy after the surgery. He smiles, gets up from the wheelchair and runs to greet the people who saved his life. Dima, Evgeni, and Edvin meet the boy with presents happy that the money raised at the concert saved a child's life. The video is strongly connected to the song delivering the message that everything is possible in this world if you only believe.

=== Eurovision ===
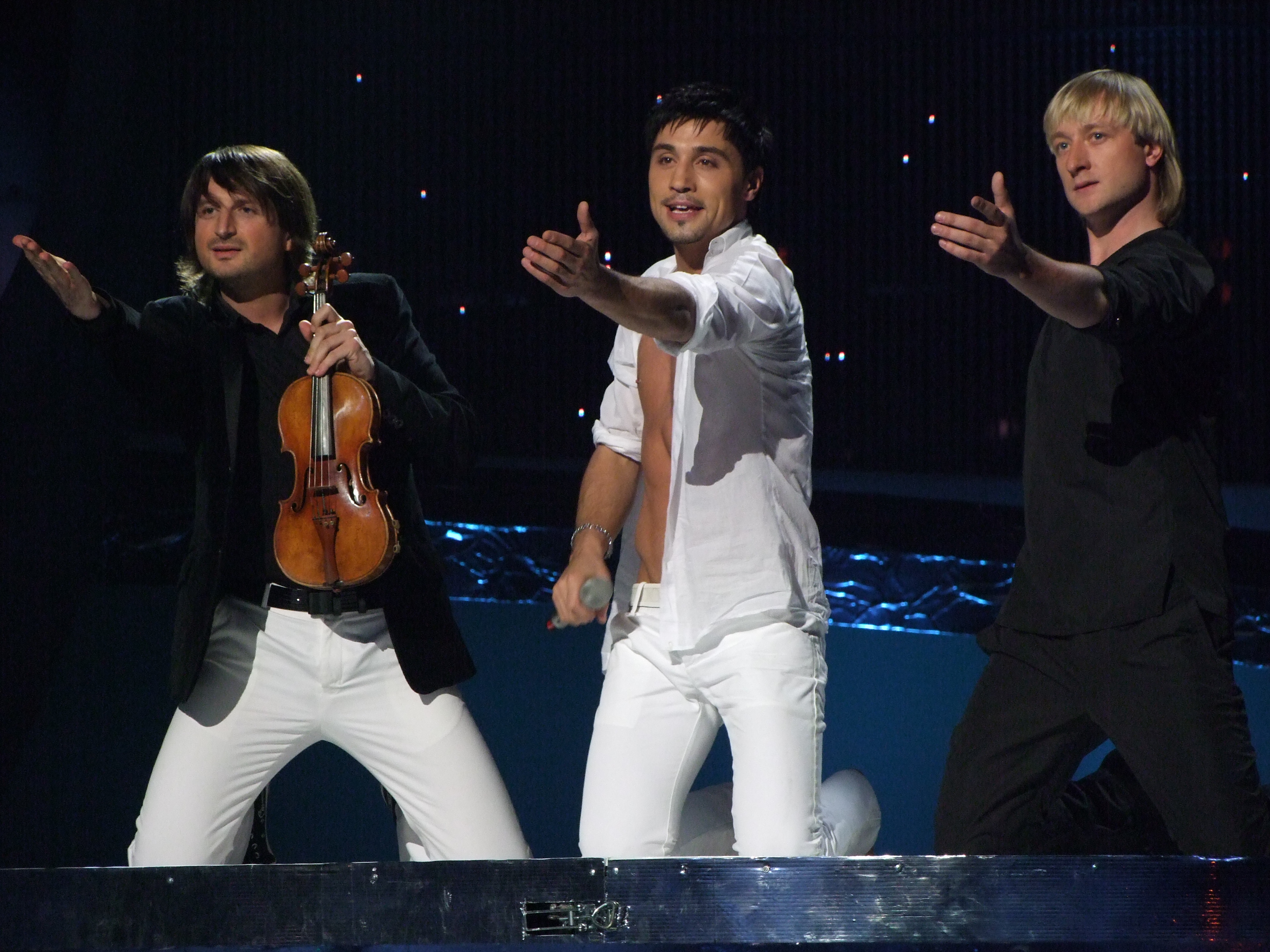
Marton, Bilan, and Plushenko performing "Believe" at Eurovision.

On 20 May 2008, the first semi-final of the Eurovision Song Contest was held in the Belgrade Arena in Belgrade hosted by Radio Television of Serbia (RTS) and broadcast live throughout the continent. Bilan performed "Believe" eighteenth on the evening accompanied by Evgeni Plushenko –skating on artificial ice– and Edvin Marton –playing his Stradivarius violin–, following Romania's "Pe-o margine de lume" by Nico and Vlad and preceding Greece's "Secret Combination" by Kalomira. After the grand final it was revealed that it had received in its semi-final 135 points, placing third in a field of nineteen and qualifying for the final.

On 24 May 2008, the grand final for the Eurovision Song Contest was held. Bilan performed again "Believe" twenty-fourth on the evening, following Serbia's "Oro" by Jelena Tomašević and Bora Dugić and preceding Norway's "Hold On Be Strong" by Maria.

The song won the contest, finishing first with a total of 272 points, becoming the first ever win for Russia, and the fourth for a former Soviet Union country. Dmitriy Medvedev, president of Russia at the time, admitted that he had watched the contest and called right away to congratulate Bilan.

=== Aftermath ===
On 31 March 2015, Bilan performed a medley of "Believe" and "Never Let You Go" in the Eurovision sixtieth anniversary show Eurovision Song Contest's Greatest Hits held in London.

== Track listing ==
Russian edition

1. "Believe" (radio version)
2. "Believe" (with violin)
3. "Believe" (with violin, karaoke)
4. "Believe" (Russian version)
5. "Believe" (Russian version, karaoke)
6. "Believe" (music video)
7. "Как раньше" 2.0 (music video)
8. "Как раньше" 2.0 (Karaoke)
9. "Photosession"
10. "Dima's biography" (in English)

German edition

1. "Believe" (Eurovision version)
2. "Believe" (radio edit)
3. "Believe" (Russian version)
4. "Believe" (music video)

Belgian edition

1. "Believe" (radio version) – 3:17
2. "Believe" (Russian version) – 3:17
3. "Believe" (Spanish version) – 3:17
4. "Believe" (music video) – 4:03

== Release history ==
Region	Date
Russia	May 26, 2008
Germany	June 6, 2008
Belgium	July 7, 2008
Denmark	July 16, 2008
Finland	July 16, 2008
Norway	July 16, 2008
Sweden	July 16, 2008

== Charts ==
=== Weekly charts ===
Chart (2008)	Peak position
Belgium (Ultratip Bubbling Under Flanders)	16
CIS Airplay (TopHit)	1
Germany (GfK)	52
Russia Airplay (TopHit)	12
Sweden (Sverigetopplistan)	28

=== Year-end charts ===
Chart (2008)	Position
CIS (Tophit)	19
Russia Airplay (TopHit)	101

Preceded by "Molitva" by Marija Šerifović	Eurovision Song Contest winners 2008	Succeeded by "Fairytale" by Alexander Rybak
