= You Are the Only One (Sergey Lazarev song) =

2016 song by Sergey Lazarev

Single by Sergey Lazarev

from the album The One
- Released: 5 March 2016
- Genre: Dance-pop
- Length: 3:06
- Label: VGTRK
- Composers: Philipp Kirkorov; Dimitris Kontopoulos
- Lyricists: John Ballard; Ralph Charlie

Sergey Lazarev singles chronology
| "Весна" (2015) | "You Are the Only One" (2016) | "Пусть весь мир подождет" (2016) |

Music video
- "You Are the Only One" on YouTube "Пусть весь мир подождёт" on YouTube

Eurovision Song Contest 2016 entry
- Country: Russia
- Artist: Sergey Lazarev
- Language: English
- Composers: Philipp Kirkorov; Dimitris Kontopoulos
- Lyricists: John Ballard; Ralph Charlie

Finals performance
- Semi-final result: 1st
- Semi-final points: 342
- Final result: 3rd
- Final points: 491

Entry chronology
- ◄ "A Million Voices" (2015)
- "Flame Is Burning" (2017) ►

Official performance video
- "You Are the Only One" (SF1) on YouTube "You Are the Only One" (Final) on YouTube

"You Are the Only One" is a song recorded by Russian singer Sergey Lazarev with music composed by Philipp Kirkorov and Dimitris Kontopoulos and English lyrics written by John Ballard and Ralph Charlie. It represented Russia in the Eurovision Song Contest 2016 held in Stockholm. The song was released as a digital download on 5 March 2016. On 28 July 2016, Lazarev released a Russian version of the song, entitled "Pust' ves' mir podozhdyot" (Russian: Пусть весь мир подождёт, "Let The Whole World Wait").

== Background ==
=== Conception ===
"You Are the Only One" was composed by Philipp Kirkorov and Dimitris Kontopoulos, the same team behind "Shady Lady", who placed second in Eurovision 2008 for Ukraine; with English lyrics by John Ballard and Ralph Charlie.

=== Selection ===
All-Russia State Television and Radio Broadcasting Company (VGTRK) announced Sergey Lazarev as their performer for the 61st edition of the Eurovision Song Contest. The following day, it was announced that Lazarev's internal selection was decided upon by the editorial board of VGTRK with the executive producer of the Russia-1 channel, Gennady Gokhshtein, revealing that a song produced by Philipp Kirkorov had also been selected. On 5 March 2016, VGTRK released "You Are the Only One" as their entry along with its music video which features Vladislava Evtushenko, Miss Universe Russia 2015.

=== Promotion ===
After its selection, Lazarev took part in a concert tour of Russia where he performed "You Are the Only One" for the first time during his concert in Kursk on 20 March 2016. A performance of the song was also presented to the Russian audience for the first time during the Russia-1 programme Tantsi so zvezdami on 27 March. On 3 April, he performed during the Eurovision Pre-Party, which was held at the Izvestia Hall in Moscow.

He also made several appearances across Europe to specifically promote "You Are the Only One" as the Russian Eurovision entry. Between 11 and 13 April, he took part in promotional activities in Tel Aviv, Israel and performed during the Israel Calling event held at the Ha'teatron venue. Between 13 and 14 April, he took part in promotional activities and provided interviews in Malta. On 17 April, he completed promotional activities in Belgrade, Serbia and recorded a performance for the talk show programme Veče sa Ivanom Ivanovićem, which aired on Prva Srpska Televizija on 18 April. On 18 April, he made promotional appearances in Athens, Greece where he attended a meet and greet during a party organized by the Oikotimes website and he performed during the MAD TV Madwalk 2016 music and fashion show.

=== Eurovision ===
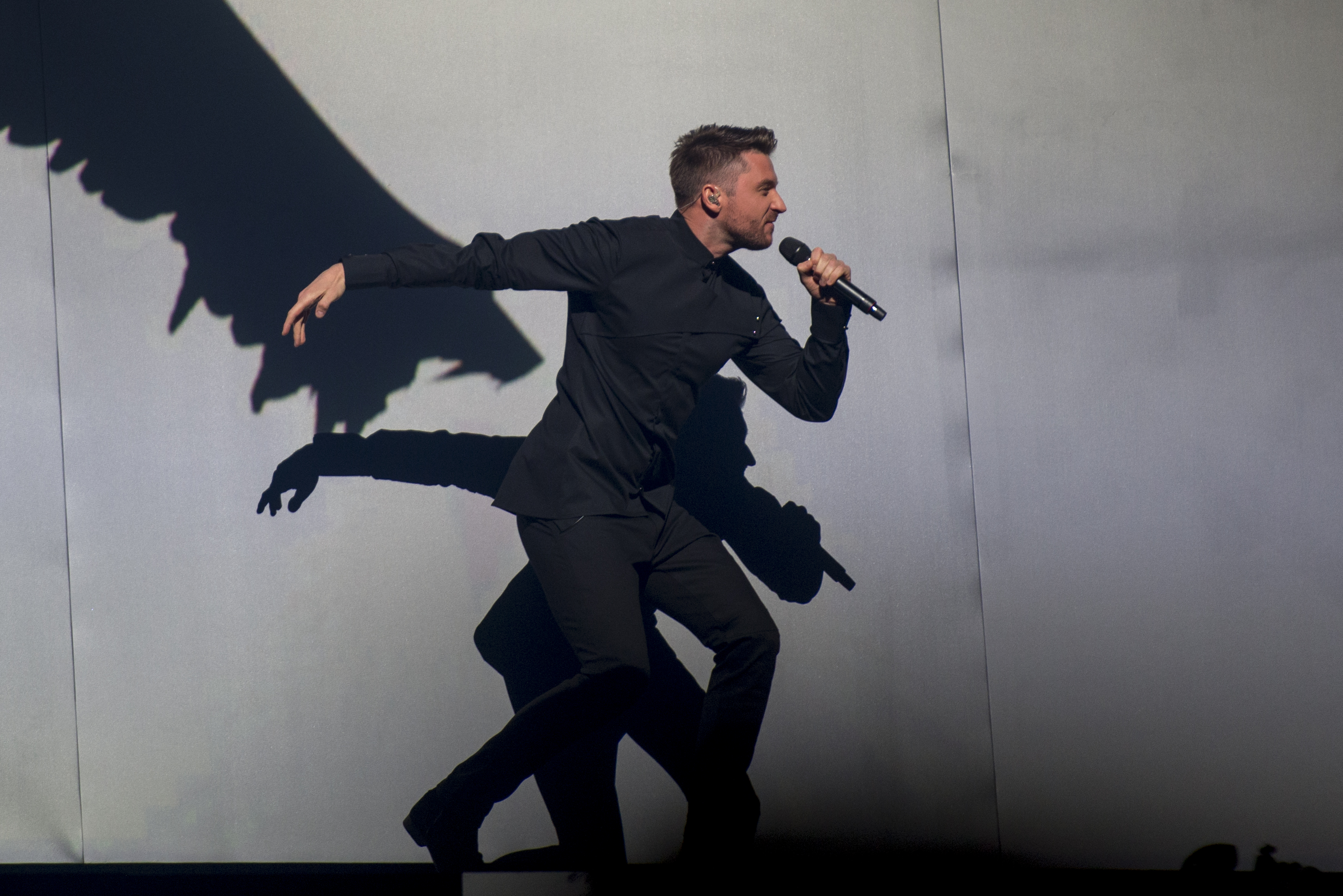
Lazarev performing "You Are the Only One" at Eurovision.

On 10 May 2016, the first semi-final of the Eurovision Song Contest was held in the Globe Arena in Stockholm hosted by Sveriges Television (SVT) and broadcast live throughout the continent. Lazarev performed "You Are the Only One" ninth on the evening and qualified for the grand final. After the grand final it was revealed that it had received in its semi-final 342 points, placing first. On 14 May 2016, he performed the song again in the grand final eighteenth on the evening.

The Eurovision performances featured Lazarev in front of a projection screen that displayed 3D images that he interacted with. He posed, climbed, and laid in the middle of the projection screen as various effects were projected. He was dressed in a black costume and performed choreographed movements together with the backing performers, who were also dressed in black. The stage director for the performance was Fokas Evangelinos. On stage, Lazarev was joined by five backing vocalists/dancers: Jennie Jahns, Alvaro Estrella, Johan D. Seil, Daniel Gill, and Adam Svensson.

At the end of voting, the song had received 491 points placing third, winning the public televote.

=== Aftermath ===
Lazarev did a version of "You Are the Only One" in duet with Elena Paparizou during the Home concert series to replace the cancelled 2020 Contest.

== Track listing ==
Digital download
| No. | Title | Length |
|---|---|---|
| 1. | "You Are the Only One" | 3:06 |

== Charts ==
=== Weekly charts ===
| Chart (2016) | Peak position |
|---|---|
| Austria (Ö3 Austria Top 40) | 40 |
| Belgium (Ultratip Bubbling Under Flanders) | 22 |
| CIS Airplay (TopHit) | 18 |
| Finland Download (Latauslista) | 17 |
| France (SNEP) | 53 |
| Hungary (Single Top 40) | 36 |
| Iceland (RÚV) | 19 |
| Russia Airplay (TopHit) | 16 |
| Scotland Singles (OCC) | 71 |
| Spain (Promusicae) | 49 |
| Sweden (Sverigetopplistan) | 34 |
| UK Singles Downloads (OCC) | 75 |
| UK Singles (Official Charts Company) | 206 |

== Release history ==
| Region | Date | Format | Label |
|---|---|---|---|
| Worldwide | 5 March 2016 | Digital download | VGTRK |

== Legacy ==
=== Nicki French version ===
"You Are The Only One" was also recorded and released in 2019 by Nicki French who herself entered the Eurovision Song Contest 2000 for the United Kingdom. French's version appears on the EP "Let's Play That Song Again" with production by Matt Pop.

| Region | Date | Format | Label |
|---|---|---|---|
| Worldwide | 26 April 2019 | Digital download | Energise Records Ltd |
