= Manizha =

Russian-Tajik singer and songwriter (born 1991)

Manizha Манижа
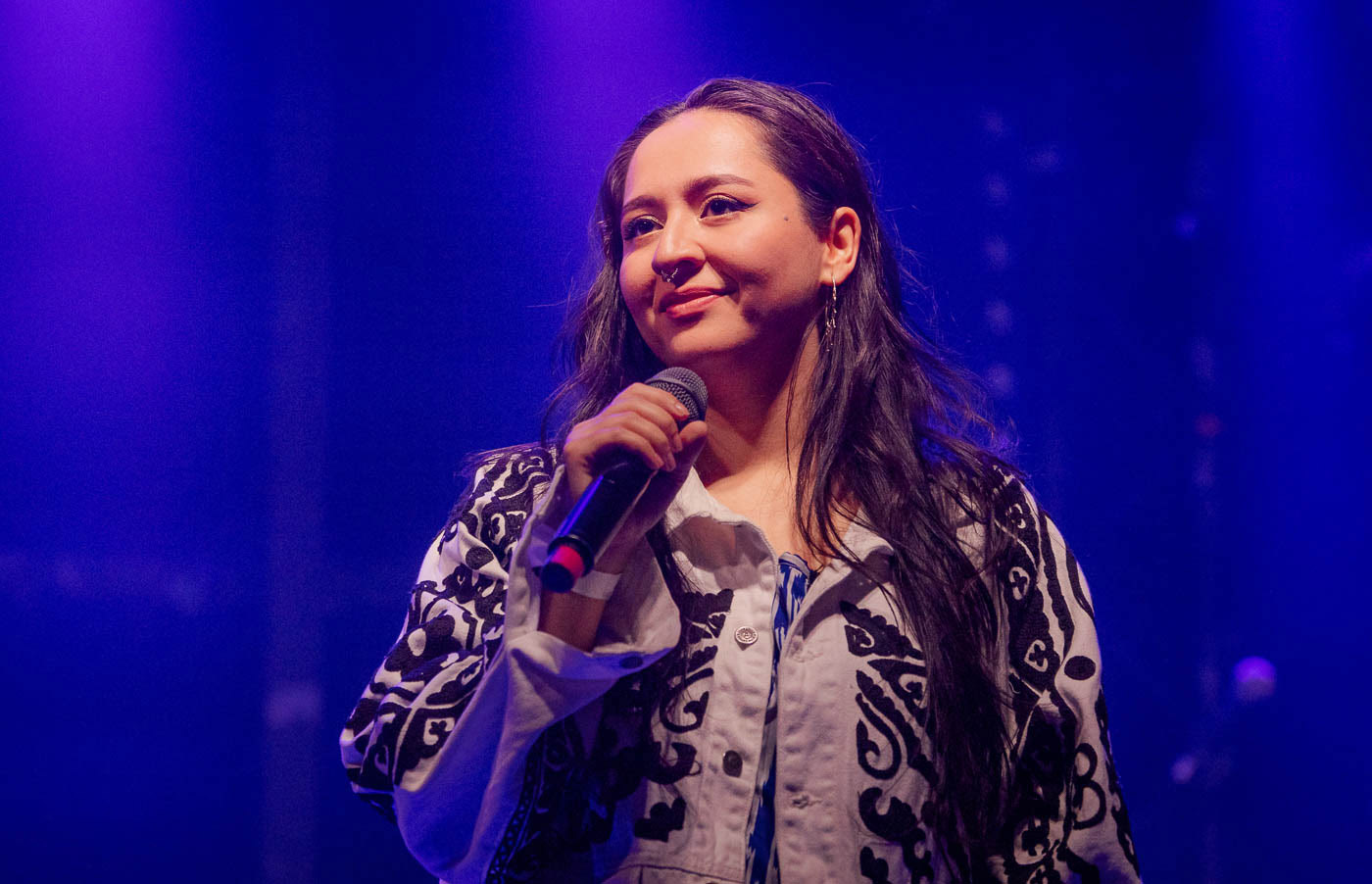
- Manizha in 2023

Background information
- Also known as: Manizha Sangin
- Born: Manizha Dalerovna Khamrayeva; 8 July 1991 (age 35); Dushanbe, Tajik SSR, Soviet Union
- Origin: Moscow, Russia
- Genres: Art pop; folktronica
- Occupations: Singer; songwriter
- Years active: 2003–present
- Spouse: Lado Kvataniya (m. 2022)

Manizha Dalerovna Sangin (Russian: Мани́жа Дале́ровна Санги́н; née Khamrayeva Russian: Хамра́ева; Tajik: Ҳамроева; born 8 July 1991), known mononymously as Manizha, is a Russian-Tajik singer and songwriter, as well as a Goodwill Ambassador for the United Nations High Commissioner for Refugees. Beginning her career in 2003 as a child singer, Manizha went on to perform with the music groups Ru.Kola, Assai, and Krip De Shin, before later pursuing a solo career. She represented Russia in the Eurovision Song Contest 2021 with the song "Russian Woman".

== Early life and education ==
Manizha was born on 8 July 1991 in Dushanbe to parents Najiba Usmanova, a psychologist and clothing designer, and a father who worked as a doctor. Her parents are divorced, and her father did not want Manizha to begin a singing career due to believing it was not a suitable career choice for a Muslim woman. Manizha's grandfather was Toji Usmon, a Tajik writer and journalist, with a monument dedicated to his honor in Khujand. Her great-grandmother was one of the first women in Tajikistan to remove her veil and begin a career of her own; in response to this, she had her children removed from her care, although she later was able to return to them and begin working outside of the home. Manizha changed her surname from Khamrayeva to Sangin in order to honor her grandmother, who was one of the first people who encouraged her to pursue music.

In 1994, Manizha and her family fled Tajikistan due to the Tajikistani Civil War, subsequently settling in Moscow. After arriving in Moscow, Manizha began studying at a music school, where she studied piano. She afterward left the school to begin training with private vocal coaches. Manizha studied psychology at the Russian State University for the Humanities.

== Career ==
=== 2003–2015: Early career ===
Manizha began her career in 2003, performing as a child singer. She took part in a number of children's singing competitions, winning the Grand Prix of the Rainbow Stars competition in Jūrmala, becoming a laureate of the Ray of Hope festival organized by Mir, and becoming a laureate of the Kaunas Talent competition in Kaunas. She recorded a number of songs in both Russian and Tajik, before joining the music project Ru.Kola in 2007. That year, she became a finalist at the Five Stars music competition in Sochi.

Manizha later left the Ru.Kola project, and joined the Russian group Assai in 2011. She later left Assai to join Krip De Shin soon after, which was formed along with other former members of Assai. With Krip De Shin, she recorded an extended play and performed at various music festivals throughout Russia. Due to creative differences between herself and the band, she later opted to leave the group. After leaving the group, Manizha moved to London, and later began studying gospel music in both London and New York City.

=== 2016–2020: Independent breakthrough ===
In 2016, Manizha returned to her music career, with the release of several independently released singles. The singles were followed by the release of her debut studio album, Manuscript, which was independently released in February 2017. Following the release of Manuscript, Manizha began working on her second studio album, ЯIAM, which was released in March 2018. Describing the album, Manizha stated that it was based on the "architecture of the personality" of a person. Her debut solo extended play Womanizha was released in April 2019.

=== 2021–present: Eurovision Song Contest and subsequent releases ===
In March 2021, it was confirmed that Manizha would be taking part in the Russian national final for the Eurovision Song Contest 2021 with the song "Russian Woman". At the final, held in Moscow on 8 March 2021, Manizha was declared the winner after receiving 39.7% of the public vote. She represented Russia in the contest in Rotterdam, where she placed ninth out of 26 countries, receiving 204 points.

After Russia invaded Ukraine on 24 February 2022, Manizha stated her opposition to the invasion, referring to the Ukrainian backgrounds of her soon-to-be husband and daughter-in-law. She released the single "Soldier" on 13 March in response to the invasion.

As a consequence of the invasion, Russia was excluded from the Eurovision Song Contest 2022, and was banned from entering future contests. Due to this, Manizha remains the last Russian representative in the contest (penultimate in any Eurovision event, behind Tatyana Mezhentseva).

== Social positions ==
In 2017, Manizha began posting unedited photos of herself with the hashtag #TheTraumaOfBeauty and captions discussing her struggles with her body image. At her concert on the roof of the Château de Fantomas in Moscow, Manizha took off her stage makeup and invited the public to join this manifesto. She distributed wet wipes to those who wanted to.

Manizha supports various charitable foundations: she performed at the charity festival "Anton is here near" 2017, organised by the foundation helping autistic children; at the closing of the IX World Children's Games of the winners of 2018, organized by the "Give Life" Foundation helping children with cancer; took part in the "Star of Kindness" charity event in support of the "Children butterflies" and others.

In February 2019, Manizha launched a social campaign against domestic violence. As part of this project, she released a free mobile application called Silsila (in Persian - "thread") to help victims of domestic violence. The app allows users to quickly call for help in an emergency using the panic button and offers a list of the nearest crisis centers and shelters in which to hide. Not all the centers that the team listed had been tested, only some of them can be contacted regardless of gender, nationality and documents. In support of the campaign, together with the director Lado Quatania ("HypeProduction"), a video was released for the song "Mama" (Russian and English versions). The video raises the problem of domestic violence against women and adolescents, as well as the problems of transformation from a child to an adult. The video provides statistics on the scale of the problem of violence in Russia. Manizha's team collects their own statistics. The project was created without the support of the state, third-party companies or funds. Manizha's mother sold her apartment to help pay for the app.

Manizha also actively supports the LGBT community. In 2019, she starred in a video for the Russian online queer magazine "Otkritiye" ("Open") during Pride Month. After that, as the singer admits, about 10 thousand people unsubscribed from her Instagram. In 2020, she sang her version of Cher's song "Believe" during the Otkritiye's Digital Pride. In the autumn of the same year, she performed at the Queerfest in St. Petersburg.

In October 2020, the United Nations High Commissioner for Refugees (UNHCR) announced Manizha as a Goodwill Ambassador for UNHCR.

On 9 December 2021, Manizha visited Almaty, Kazakhstan in honour of the 16 Days of Activism Against Gender-Based Violence campaign.

On 24 February 2022, Manizha stated her opposition to the Russian invasion of Ukraine via an Instagram post, referring to her husband and sister-in-law's Ukrainian background. Her opposition to the war led to her facing a campaign to have her blacklisted, leading to several promoters cancelling her performances after government supporters began posting personal information of concert organizers.

== Personal life ==
On 6 September 2022, Manizha announced her marriage to film director Lado Kvataniya. Together they have a daughter, born in July 2023.

== Awards and nominations ==
Award	Year	Nominee(s)	Category	Result	Ref.
Berlin Music Video Awards	2019	"Мама"	Best Concept	Nominated	
Berlin Music Video Awards	2020	"Недославянка"	Best Concept	3rd Place	
Berlin Music Video Awards	2024	"Standing Between Two Walls"	Best Concept	Nominated	
Berlin Music Video Awards	2025	"Gun"	Best Concept	Nominated	
Clio Awards	2025	"Gun"	Music Video	Silver	
Clio Awards	2025	"Gun"	Cinematography	Silver	

== Discography ==
=== Studio albums ===
Title	Details
Manuscript	Released: 17 February 2017; Label: Independent; Format: Digital download
ЯIAM	Released: 23 March 2018; Label: Independent; Format: Digital download

=== Extended plays ===
Title	Details
Womanizha	Released: 26 April 2019; Label: Independent; Format: Digital download

=== Singles ===
Title	Year	Peak chart positions		Album
Title	Year	NLD	SWE	Album
"I Love Too Much"	2016	—	—	Manuscript
"Little Lady"	2016	—	—	Manuscript
"Sleepy Song" (with Dima Ustinov)	2016	—	—	Non-album single
"Устал" (I Got Tired)	2017	—	—	ЯIAM
"Hear What I Feel"	2017	—	—	Non-album single
"Изумруд" (Emerald)	2017	—	—	ЯIAM
"Любил, как мог" (I Loved as Much as I Could)	2018	—	—	Non-album singles
"Мне легко" (It's Easy for Me)	2018	—	—	Non-album singles
"Black Swan" (with Anya Chipovskaya)	2018	—	—	Non-album singles
"Завтрак" (Breakfast)	2019	—	—	Non-album singles
"Сейчас дважды не случится" (Now Will Not Happen Twice)	2019	—	—	Non-album singles
"Недославянка" (Not Slavic Enough)	2019	—	—	Non-album singles
"Vanya"	2019	—	—	Non-album singles
"Человеку нужен человек" (A Human Needs a Human)	2020	—	—	Non-album singles
"Начало" (The Beginning)	2020	—	—	Non-album singles
"На путь воина встаю" (I'm Getting on the Way of Warrior)	2020	—	—	Mulan (Official Motion Picture Soundtrack – Russian Dub)
"Город солнца" (The City of Sun)	2020	—	—	Non-album singles
"Про тебя" (About You)	2021	—	—	Non-album singles
"Akkulista" (featuring Everthe8)	2021	—	—	Non-album singles
"Russian Woman"	2021	81	84	Non-album singles
"Держи Меня Земля" (Hold Me Mother Earth)	2021	—	—	Non-album singles
"Soldier"	2022	—	—	Non-album singles
"Standing Between Two Walls"	2023	—	—	Non-album singles
"Tummy"	2023	—	—	Non-album singles

Awards and achievements
Preceded by Little Big with "Uno"	Russia in the Eurovision Song Contest; 2021	Succeeded by None
