= North Macedonia in the Eurovision Song Contest 2021 =

- Eurovision Song Contest 2021
- Country: North Macedonia
- Selection process: Internal selection
- Announcement date: Artist: 20 January 2021; Song: 11 March 2021

Competing entry
- Song: "Here I Stand"
- Artist: Vasil
- Songwriters: Vasil Garvanliev; Borče Kuzmanovski; Davor Jordanovski

Placement
- Semi-final result: Failed to qualify (15th)

Participation chronology

North Macedonia was represented at the Eurovision Song Contest 2021 with the song "Here I Stand" performed by Vasil and written by Vasil along with Borče Kuzmanovski and Davor Jordanovski. Vasil was internally selected by North Macedonia's public broadcaster Macedonian Radio Television (MRT) to represent North Macedonia at the 2021 contest in Rotterdam, Netherlands, after he was due to compete in the 2020 contest with "You" before the 2020 event's cancellation. Vasil's appointment as the Macedonian representative was announced on 20 January 2021, while his song, "Here I Stand", was presented to the public on 11 March 2021.

North Macedonia was drawn to compete in the first semi-final of the Eurovision Song Contest which took place on 18 May 2021. Performing during the show in position 6, "Here I Stand" was not announced among the top 10 entries of the first semi-final and therefore did not qualify to compete in the final. It was later revealed that North Macedonia placed fifteenth out of the 16 participating countries in the semi-final with 23 points.

== Background ==
Prior to the 2021 contest, North Macedonia had participated in the Eurovision Song Contest nineteen times since its first entry in 1998 under the provisional appellation "former Yugoslav Republic of Macedonia", abbreviated "FYR Macedonia". The nation's best result in the contest to this point was seventh, which it achieved in 2019 with the song "Proud" performed by Tamara Todevska. Following the introduction of semi-finals in 2004, North Macedonia had featured in only six finals.

Macedonian Radio Television (MRT) broadcasts the event within North Macedonia and organises the selection process for the nation's entry. MRT confirmed their intentions to participate at the 2021 Eurovision Song Contest on 16 September 2020. Between 2008 and 2011, North Macedonia selected their entries using the national final Skopje Fest. During this period, the nation failed to qualify to the final on every occasion. Between 2012 and 2014, the broadcaster internally selected North Macedonia's entry, resulting in a single qualification to the final during this period in 2012. After failing to qualify in 2015 where Skopje Fest was used as a national final, the broadcaster internally selected the nation's entry since 2016, resulting in a single qualification to the final during this period in 2019. For 2021, the broadcaster again opted to internally select the country's entry.

== Before Eurovision ==
=== Internal selection ===
On 20 January 2021, MRT confirmed that Vasil would remain as North Macedonia's representative for the Eurovision Song Contest 2021. In regards to his re-selection as the Macedonian entrant, Vasil stated: "Rarely in life do we get not just one, but three chances to make our dream come true. In 2019 I proudly stood behind Tamara Todevska, in 2020 I dedicated everything to "You" - but Covid said no! In 2021 I am using my personal journey and story to place my heart in your hands through my voice. Never stop believing, dreaming and fighting for what you stand for in life. Dreams do come true!" A submission period was opened on the same day for interested composers to submit their songs until 27 January 2021.

On 20 January 2021, it was announced that Vasil would perform the song "Here I Stand" at the Eurovision Song Contest 2021. "Here I Stand" was presented to the public on 11 March 2021 through the release of the official music video via the official Eurovision Song Contest's YouTube channel. The song was composed by Vasil, Borče Kuzmanovski, Davor Jordanovski with lyrics written by Vasil himself, and featured backing vocals performed by former members of the Chicago Children Choir.

WIn the middle of the chaos and whirlwind of disappointments last year, I wrote "Here I Stand" in one breath without any specific aim or focus. I think it rose out of one of those special and rare moments in life when you are at one with yourself and able to let emotions flow in their purest form without self judgment, freely and sincerely.

— Vasil

=== Music video controversy ===
The music video of "Here I Stand" led to controversy due to a piece of art in the venue where the video was shot that resembled the colors of the Bulgarian flag; Vasil previously confirmed that he holds Bulgarian citizenship, due to his grandmother's origin. The music video was eventually edited as a result of public pressure and Vasil stated during an interview to the Macedonian newspaper Sloboden Pechat that the triptych artwork in the video, displayed in the Daut Pasha's Bath in Skopje with three vertical panels of cream, green and a rusty orange colour, "had no deliberate connection with the Bulgarian flag". He also added that it is a "creation of the author Janeta Vangeli and is inspired by Jesus Christ" and that "the Bulgarian flag [colors] are horizontal".

In an Instagram post, Vasil wrote: "I am a music ambassador, and in music there is no religion, politics, orientation, race or color. I had absolutely no intentions to hurt anybody. Quite the opposite! I am so proud of this project which not only embodies me, but my country and culture – musicians and featured artists in the gallery. I do not apologise for being me. I never will – I didn't have a choice in that. However, if I hurt anybody in any way, from the bottom of my heart... I am sorry. Forgive me". MRT formed a special commission to decide whether Vasil should withdraw from Eurovision Song Contest over claims he had spread "Bulgarian propaganda", later deciding that he would be allowed to participate. The intense dispute was due to the worsened Bulgaria–North Macedonia relations then.

== At Eurovision ==
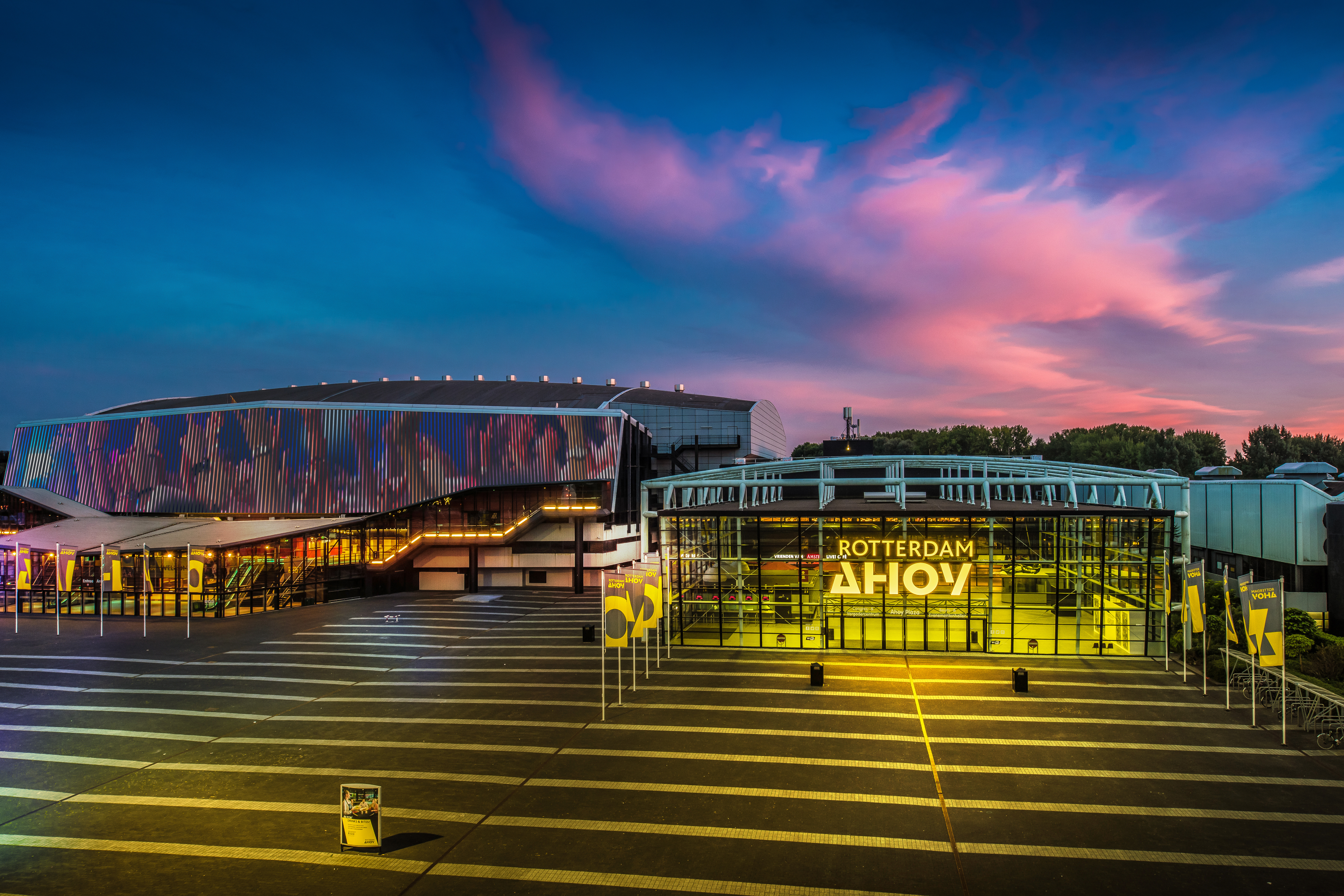
The Eurovision Song Contest 2021 took place at the Rotterdam Ahoy in Rotterdam, Netherlands

According to Eurovision rules, all nations with the exceptions of the host country and the "Big Five" (France, Germany, Italy, Spain and the United Kingdom) are required to qualify from one of two semi-finals in order to compete in the final; the top ten countries from each semi-final progress to the final. The European Broadcasting Union (EBU) split up the competing countries into six different pots based on voting patterns from previous contests, with countries with favourable voting histories put into the same pot. The semi-final allocation draw held for the Eurovision Song Contest 2020 on 28 January 2020 was used for the 2021 contest, which North Macedonia was placed into the first semi-final, which was held on 18 May 2021, and was scheduled to perform in the first half of the show.

Once all the competing songs for the 2021 contest had been released, the running order for the semi-finals was decided by the shows' producers rather than through another draw, so that similar songs were not placed next to each other. North Macedonia was set to perform in position 6, following the entry from Australia and before the entry from Ireland.

The two semi-finals and final were broadcast in North Macedonia on MRT 1 and MRT 2 with commentary by Eli Tanaskovska. The Macedonian spokesperson, who announced the top 12-point score awarded by the Macedonian jury during the final, was Vane Markoski.

=== Semi-final ===
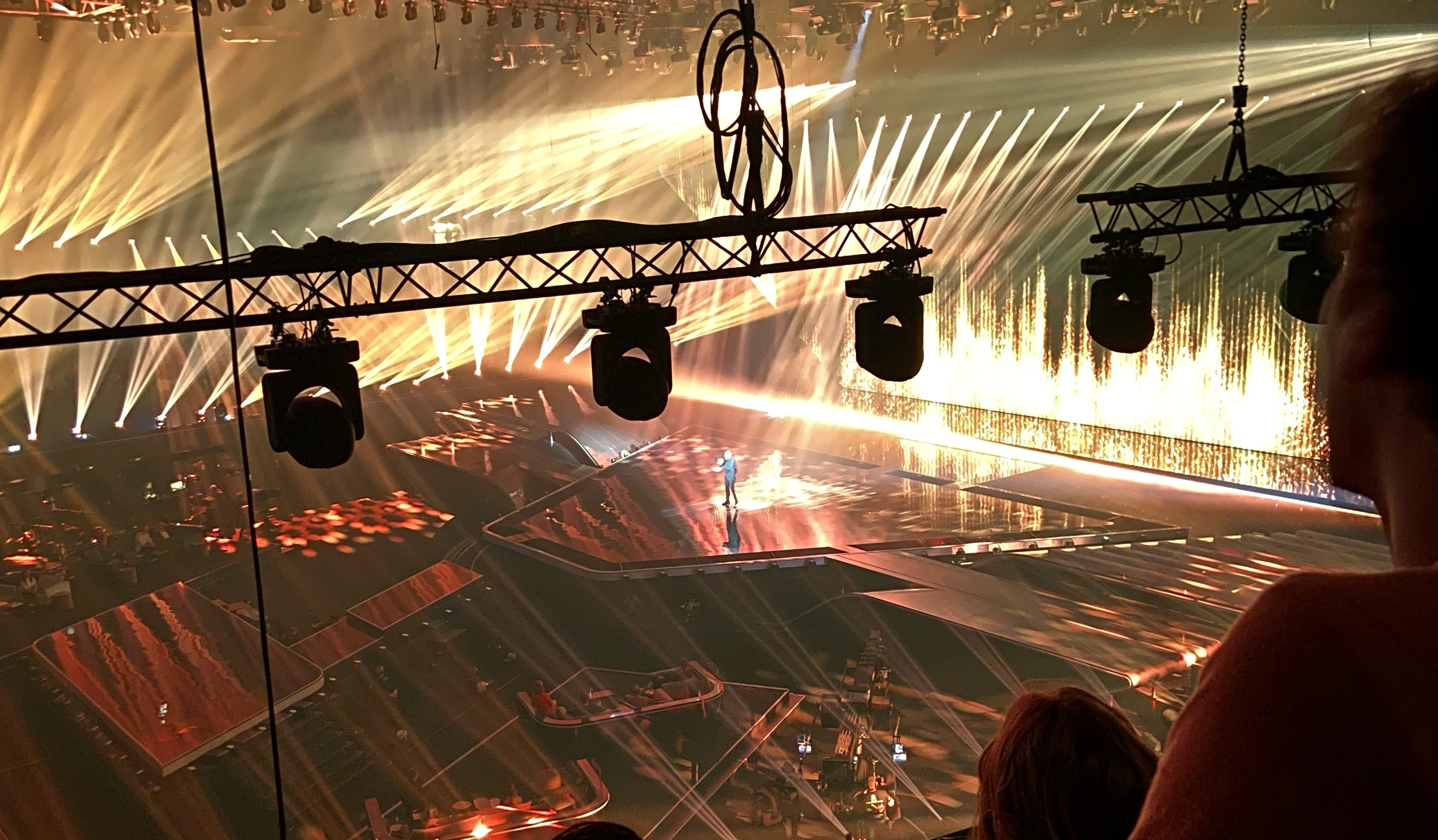
Vasil during a rehearsal before the first semi-final

Vasil took part in technical rehearsals on 8 and 12 May, followed by dress rehearsals on 17 and 18 May. This included the jury show on 17 May where the professional juries of each country watched and voted on the competing entries.

The Macedonian performance featured Vasil performing alone on stage in a black suit which he opened towards the end to reveal a disco ball chestplate. The stage was dark in the beginning with a single spotlight on Vasil and the performance featured holographic effects, including a light on Vasil's heart which transformed into a larger effect that he interacted with using his hand. The artistic director for the performance was Tine Matulessy.

At the end of the show, North Macedonia was not announced among the top 10 entries in the first semi-final and therefore failed to qualify to compete in the final. It was later revealed that North Macedonia placed fifteenth in the semi-final, receiving a total of 23 points: 11 points from the televoting and 12 points from the juries.

=== Voting ===
Voting during the three shows involved each country awarding two sets of points from 1-8, 10 and 12: one from their professional jury and the other from televoting. Each nation's jury consisted of five music industry professionals who are citizens of the country they represent, with a diversity in gender and age represented. The judges assess each entry based on the performances during the second Dress Rehearsal of each show, which takes place the night before each live show, against a set of criteria including: vocal capacity; the stage performance; the song's composition and originality; and the overall impression by the act. Jury members may only take part in panel once every three years, and are obliged to confirm that they are not connected to any of the participating acts in a way that would impact their ability to vote impartially. Jury members should also vote independently, with no discussion of their vote permitted with other jury members. The exact composition of the professional jury, and the results of each country's jury and televoting were released after the grand final; the individual results from each jury member were also released in an anonymised form.

Below is a breakdown of points awarded to North Macedonia and awarded by North Macedonia in the first semi-final and grand final of the contest, and the breakdown of the jury voting and televoting conducted during the two shows:

==== Points awarded to North Macedonia ====
Points awarded to North Macedonia (Semi-final 1)
Score	Televote	Jury
12 points		
10 points		
8 points	Slovenia	
7 points		
6 points		Romania
5 points		
4 points		Slovenia
3 points		
2 points	Romania	Ireland
1 point	Croatia	

==== Points awarded by North Macedonia ====
Points awarded by North Macedonia (Semi-final 1)
Score	Televote	Jury
12 points	Croatia	Israel
10 points	Malta	Malta
8 points	Russia	Croatia
7 points	Azerbaijan	Russia
6 points	Cyprus	Azerbaijan
5 points	Ukraine	Ukraine
4 points	Lithuania	Cyprus
3 points	Slovenia	Slovenia
2 points	Belgium	Norway
1 point	Israel	Sweden

Points awarded by North Macedonia (Final)
Score	Televote	Jury
12 points	Serbia	Serbia
10 points	Albania	Italy
8 points	Italy	Israel
7 points	Switzerland	France
6 points	Cyprus	Switzerland
5 points	France	Malta
4 points	Ukraine	Iceland
3 points	Azerbaijan	Sweden
2 points	Finland	Cyprus
1 point	Russia	Russia

==== Detailed voting results ====
The following members comprised the North Macedonia jury:

- Robert Bilbilov
- Jana Burčeska (jury member in semi-final 1)
- Lara Ivanova
- Erhan Shukri
- Ile Spasev
- Darko Tasev (jury member in the final)

Detailed voting results from North Macedonia (Semi-final 1)
R/O	Country	Jury							Televote	
R/O	Country	Juror A	Juror B	Juror C	Juror D	Juror E	Rank	Points	Rank	Points
01	Lithuania	14	13	7	15	15	13		7	4
02	Slovenia	9	9	4	7	9	8	3	8	3
03	Russia	4	10	3	3	7	4	7	3	8
04	Sweden	8	8	9	10	8	10	1	13	
05	Australia	10	11	10	9	10	12		15	
06	North Macedonia									
07	Ireland	12	14	14	11	13	14		14	
08	Cyprus	6	6	11	8	6	7	4	5	6
09	Norway	11	5	15	4	14	9	2	12	
10	Croatia	2	2	8	6	5	3	8	1	12
11	Belgium	13	15	12	14	11	15		9	2
12	Israel	1	1	1	1	2	1	12	10	1
13	Romania	5	12	13	13	12	11		11	
14	Azerbaijan	15	4	6	5	4	5	6	4	7
15	Ukraine	7	7	5	12	3	6	5	6	5
16	Malta	3	3	2	2	1	2	10	2	10

Detailed voting results from North Macedonia (Final)
R/O	Country	Jury							Televote	
R/O	Country	Juror A	Juror B	Juror C	Juror D	Juror E	Rank	Points	Rank	Points
01	Cyprus	10	12	15	9	4	9	2	5	6
02	Albania	5	18	11	18	11	12		2	10
03	Israel	4	7	1	8	5	3	8	22	
04	Belgium	12	6	25	16	14	14		23	
05	Russia	8	11	4	13	21	10	1	10	1
06	Malta	9	5	2	5	7	6	5	13	
07	Portugal	11	26	7	15	8	13		21	
08	Serbia	1	3	9	2	2	1	12	1	12
09	United Kingdom	21	10	13	12	12	16		20	
10	Greece	14	16	12	10	17	17		16	
11	Switzerland	3	4	23	4	3	5	6	4	7
12	Iceland	26	9	5	3	16	7	4	12	
13	Spain	23	19	14	24	13	20		25	
14	Moldova	22	20	17	26	23	24		15	
15	Germany	24	21	19	21	26	25		24	
16	Finland	20	17	21	17	18	22		9	2
17	Bulgaria	15	8	20	22	9	15		11	
18	Lithuania	25	22	26	23	20	26		17	
19	Ukraine	6	25	24	6	15	11		7	4
20	France	2	2	6	7	10	4	7	6	5
21	Azerbaijan	16	15	10	11	22	18		8	3
22	Norway	18	23	8	19	19	19		18	
23	Netherlands	13	24	18	25	24	23		26	
24	Italy	7	1	3	1	6	2	10	3	8
25	Sweden	19	13	16	14	1	8	3	14	
26	San Marino	17	14	22	20	25	21		19	
