= North Macedonia in the Eurovision Song Contest 2020 =

- Eurovision Song Contest 2020
- Country: North Macedonia
- Selection process: Internal selection
- Announcement date: Artist: 15 January 2020; Song: 8 March 2020

Competing entry
- Song: "You"
- Artist: Vasil
- Songwriters: Nevena Neskoska; Kalina Neskoska; Alice Schroeder

Placement
- Final result: Contest cancelled

Participation chronology

North Macedonia was set to be represented at the Eurovision Song Contest 2020 with the song "You" written by Nevena Neskoska, Kalina Neskoska and Alice Schroeder. The song was performed by Vasil, who was internally selected by North Macedonia's public broadcaster Macedonian Radio Television (MRT) to compete for North Macedonia at the 2020 contest in Rotterdam, Netherlands. Vasil's appointment as the Macedonian representative was announced on 15 January 2020, while his song, "You", was presented to the public on 8 March 2020.

North Macedonia was drawn to compete in the first semi-final of the Eurovision Song Contest which took place on 12 May 2020. However, the contest was cancelled due to the COVID-19 pandemic.

== Background ==
Prior to the 2020 contest, North Macedonia had participated in the Eurovision Song Contest nineteen times since its first entry in 1998 under the provisional appellation "former Yugoslav Republic of Macedonia", abbreviated "FYR Macedonia". The nation's best result in the contest to this point was seventh, which it achieved in 2019 with the song "Proud" performed by Tamara Todevska. Following the introduction of semi-finals for the 2004, North Macedonia had featured in only six finals.

Macedonian Radio Television (MRT) broadcasts the event within North Macedonia and organises the selection process for the nation's entry. MRT confirmed their intentions to participate at the 2020 Eurovision Song Contest on 6 September 2019. Between 2008 and 2011, North Macedonia selected their entries using the national final Skopje Fest. During this period, the nation failed to qualify to the final on every occasion. Between 2012 and 2014, the broadcaster internally selected North Macedonia's entry, resulting in a single qualification to the final during this period in 2012. After failing to qualify in 2015 where Skopje Fest was used as a national final, the broadcaster internally selected the nation's entry since 2016, resulting in a single qualification to the final during this period in 2019. For 2020, the broadcaster again opted to internally select the country's entry.

== Before Eurovision ==
=== Internal selection ===
On 15 January 2020, MRT announced that the programming board of MRT 1 had internally selected Vasil Garvanliev to represent North Macedonia in Rotterdam. Vasil previously attempted to represent North Macedonia at the Eurovision Song Contest in 2007 by competing in the national final selection with the song "Pomogni mi" which placed thirteenth. In regards to his selection as the Macedonian entrant, Vasil stated: "I am beyond honoured to present my country at the Song Contest in Rotterdam and I can hardly wait to put all my experience and knowledge into creating a magical journey that will touch people's heart across Europe." A submission period was opened on the same day for interested composers to submit their songs until 31 January 2020.

On 14 February 2020, it was announced that Vasil would perform the song "You" at the Eurovision Song Contest 2020. "You" was presented to the public on 8 March 2020 through the release of the official music video, directed by Milena Vitman and recorded by Gjorgi Vacev with production by Jellmaz Dervishi, via the official Eurovision Song Contest's YouTube channel. The song was composed by Nevena Neskoska with lyrics written by Nevena Neskoska, Kalina Neskoska and Alice Schroeder.

== At Eurovision ==
According to Eurovision rules, all nations with the exceptions of the host country and the "Big Five" (France, Germany, Italy, Spain and the United Kingdom) are required to qualify from one of two semi-finals in order to compete for the final; the top ten countries from each semi-final progress to the final. The European Broadcasting Union (EBU) split up the competing countries into six different pots based on voting patterns from previous contests, with countries with favourable voting histories put into the same pot. On 28 January 2020, a special allocation draw was held which placed each country into one of the two semi-finals, as well as which half of the show they would perform in. North Macedonia was placed into the first semi-final, to be held on 12 May 2020, and was scheduled to perform in the first half of the show. However, due to the COVID-19 pandemic, the contest was cancelled. It was later revealed that Vasil would be joined by four backing vocalists for the Eurovision Song Contest: Aleksandra Janeva, Barbara Popović, Lina Pejovska and Martija Stanojković. Barbara Popović previously represented Macedonia in the Junior Eurovision Song Contest 2013, while Martija Stanojković previously represented Macedonia in the Junior Eurovision Song Contest 2016.

Prior to the Eurovision Song Celebration YouTube broadcast in place of the semi-finals, it was revealed that North Macedonia was set to perform in position 4, following the entry from Australia and before the entry from Slovenia.

The only thing I feel most sorry about is that "You" did not get the chance to be presented on the stage in its real light. Except for the fact that we had brilliant team from Sweden, Tine Matulessy and Mari Forsman Ryberger, the same ladies that took care of Tamara's performance last year at the contest in Tel Aviv, I would have been joined on stage by 4 amazing backing singers with whom the ethnic vibe of "You" would come to its fullest potential.

— Vasil
