= Eye Cue =

Macedonian pop/rock duo

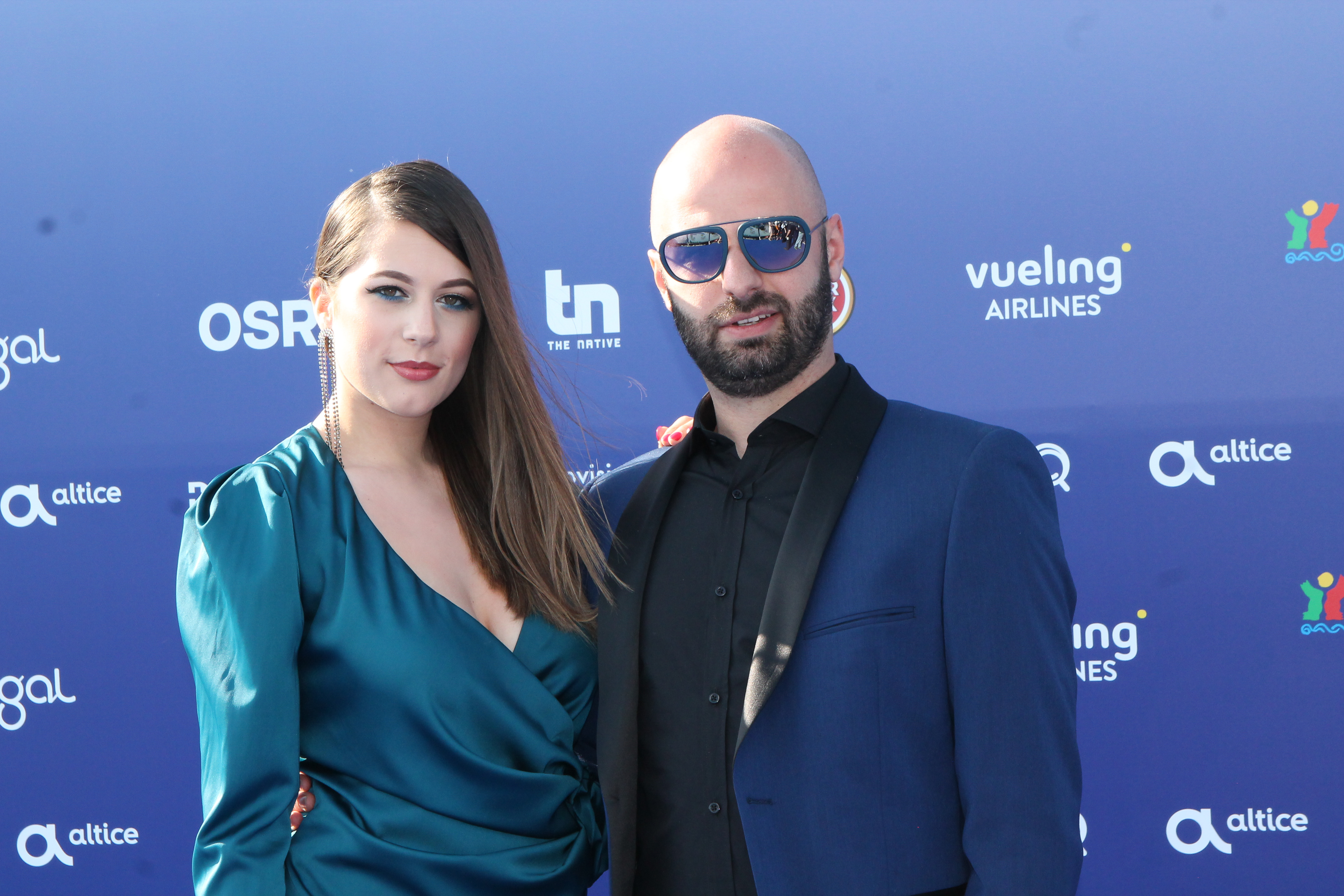
- Eye Cue in 2018

Background information
- Origin: Skopje, North Macedonia
- Genres: Pop-rock; alternative rock
- Years active: 2008–present
- Members: Bojan Trajkovski; Marija Ivanovska; Ivo Mitkovski
- Past members: Ivan Sarievski-Sare; Iskra Srbinovska; Leana Thaqi
- Website: eyecue.co

Eye Cue is a Macedonian pop-rock duo consisting of vocalists Bojan Trajkovski (born 1983) and Marija Ivanovska (born 1997), formed in 2008. The group found chart success with "Magija" in 2008, and entered the MTV Adria Top 20 with the song "Not This Time" in 2010. In 2015 they won Skopje Fest with the song "Ubava".

The duo represented Macedonia in the Eurovision Song Contest 2018 with their song "Lost and Found", held in Lisbon, Portugal.

Awards and achievements
Preceded by Daniel Kajmakoski	Skopje Fest; Winner; 2016	Succeeded by Incumbent
Preceded by Jana Burčeska with "Dance Alone"	Macedonia in the Eurovision Song Contest; 2018	Succeeded by Tamara Todevska with "Proud"
