= Vasil Garvanliev =

Macedonian singer (born 1984)

Vasil Garvanliev Васил Гарванлиев
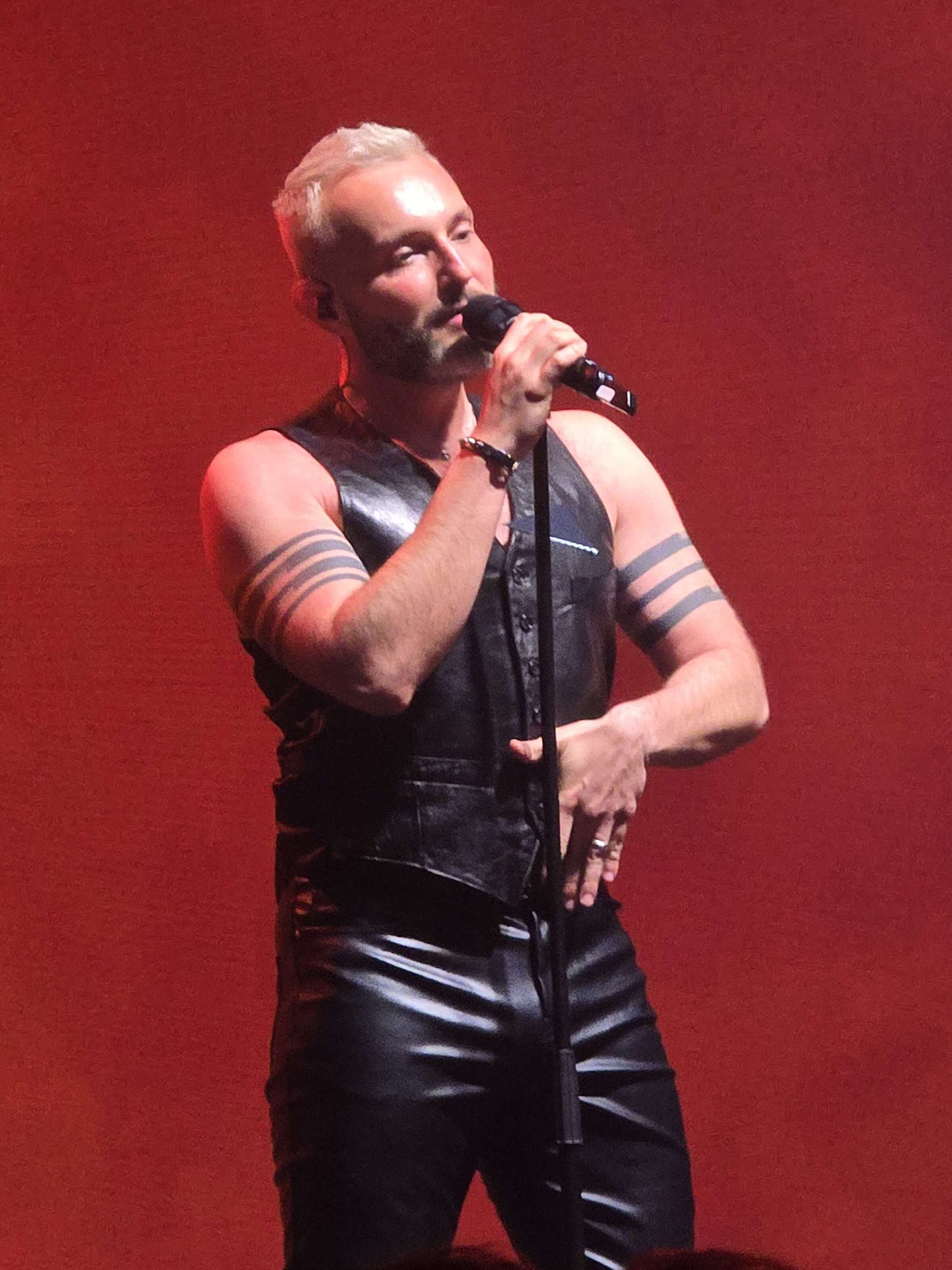
- Garvanliev in 2025

Background information
- Born: 2 November 1984 (age 42); Strumica, SR Macedonia, SFR Yugoslavia
- Genres: Classical music; opera; pop music
- Occupation: Singer
- Years active: 1991–present

Vasil Garvanliev (Macedonian: Васил Гарванлиев; born 2 November 1984), known professionally as Vasil, is a Macedonian singer. He was due to represent North Macedonia with the song "You" in the Eurovision Song Contest 2020 in Rotterdam before the event was cancelled. Instead, he represented North Macedonia in the 2021 contest, this time with the song "Here I Stand".

== Beginnings ==
=== Child singer ===
Garvanliev started singing at the age of seven. He was discovered by a Macedonian composer who was passing by when he heard Vasil singing in the street. At age eight he released an album that included the Japanese-influenced "Marionka" (in Macedonian Марионка) with lyrics about a beautiful Macedonian girl. In 1994, at age ten, he performed "Marionka" during the annual Macedonian children's song festival Zlatno Slavejče (in Macedonian: Златно славејче '94, meaning Golden Nightingale '94).

=== United States (1997–2004) ===
In 1997, at the height of the Kosovo War, he moved with his parents and his brother to the United States with the family as refugees. He became a member of the Chicago Children's Choir from 1999 to 2003. He became a main soloist for the choir, had a debut at Carnegie Hall with Chichester Psalms and was a guest artist performing with Yo-Yo Ma and members of the Chicago Symphony Orchestra. As soloist with the choir, he performed backing vocals with artists like Julie Andrews, Celine Dion, Nick Carter, New Kids on the Block, Nelly Furtado and Enrique Iglesias. He also performed with the choir in the White House with President George H. W. Bush attending. He applied for a pan-American contest for a presidential music art scholarship. Winning the regionals in Chicago, he proceeded to the U.S. national finals where he was nominated for the presidential scholarship for opera studies. He had also applied to Juilliard School. But both prospects and a music scholarship in New York at the Manhattan School of Music were abruptly severed when, following tighter immigration requirements in the wake of September 11 attacks, all his family members (both parents and brother) were deported for insufficient paperwork for U.S. citizenship. After he returned to Macedonia for family reasons, he was not allowed back into the United States. He moved to Milan and London with musical prospects and eventually to Toronto, Canada in 2004 on a scholarship.

== Career ==
=== Classical / Opera ===
Trying to apply for music studies at the Royal College of Music in London, Garvanliev simultaneously auditioned in Milano where he studied briefly at La Scala Theatre Academy. Meanwhile, his spot at the Royal College of Music had expired. He instead found an opportunity in Canada at the Royal Conservatory of Music in Toronto in 2004. He got a full music scholarship in Toronto at The Glenn Gould School. He went on to perform as a baritone in Canada.

He attended The Glenn Gould School from 2004 to 2008, earning a performance diploma in Voice. At the University of Toronto, he earned a diploma in opera – voice in 2010. He graduated from Calgary Opera's Emerging Artists program. He was a guest artist in Opera Atelier for nine years (2005–2014). He also took part in Highlands Opera Studio in Haliburton, Ontario, Canada (2009–2013) and spent more than four years in the Young Artist Program as a guest soloist at the Calgary Opera in Alberta, Canada (September 2010 to November 2014). In May–June 2015, he was a finalist in the Montreal International Musical Competition. As a baritone in opera for 13 years, he sang over 50 lead roles. For many years, and until 2016, he continued to serve as a guest artist with the Chicago Children's Choir.

He lived in Canada for 10 years before returning to Europe and settling for a year in London in 2017 for additional training and in 2018 settled back in Macedonia. He represented North Macedonia in a number of classical music events. Originally a bass-baritone, he also started singing as a tenor.

=== Pop and contemporary music ===
Alongside his career in classical music, he also tried to develop a concurrent pop career. At the end of some of his classical music performances, he used to offer some contemporary music and jazz performances, gaining support and encouragement.

Having had an album at the age of 8, he returned to his passion for pop music by trying to represent Macedonia in the Eurovision Song Contest 2007 by taking part in the qualification rounds of the Macedonian national song competition Skopje Fest performing his self-written song "Pomogni mi" ("Help me"). He was placed 13th in the competition and failed to represent Macedonia in Eurovision. Karolina Gočeva winning the contest went on to represent Macedonia with the song "Mojot svet".

In 2016, he appeared on Chance the Rapper’s critically acclaimed Coloring Book album. He was credited as backing vocalist on four of the 14 tracks of the album: "All We Got", "Same Drugs", "How Great" and "Finish Line / Drown". The album incorporated gospel with hip hop, was critically acclaimed, and appeared on many music critics' "best of 2016" lists.

In 2018, he returned to his desire to develop a pop career by releasing "Gerdan" ("Necklace") in 2018, "Patuvam" ("Travelling") in 2019 and "Mojata Ulica" ("Welcome to my Street") in 2020, all accompanied by music videos.

He recorded an album in the UK in 2020 but put the album project on hold when it was announced in January 2020 that he was going to represent North Macedonia in the Eurovision Song Contest 2020.

=== Eurovision Song Contest 2020 ===
Garvanliev was a backing vocalist for the Macedonian entry "Proud", performed by Tamara Todevska, at the Eurovision Song Contest 2019. The three-member backing vocals included Garvanliev, Aleksandra Janeva and Antonia Gigovska. The song won the jury vote, but finished 7th overall after taking account of the public vote. On 15 January 2020, it was announced that he had been internally selected by the national broadcaster Macedonian Radio Television to represent North Macedonia in the Eurovision Song Contest 2020 in Rotterdam, the Netherlands. He was scheduled to perform the song "You", composed and produced by Nevena Neskoska with words by Alice Schroeder, Kalina Neskoska and Nevena Neskoska. Javier Lloret de Muller, Darko Dimitrov and Lazar Cvetkoski provided additional production. The 2020 contest was eventually cancelled because of the COVID-19 pandemic.

=== Eurovision Song Contest 2021 ===
After the cancellation of 2020, it was announced on 20 January 2021 that Vasil will remain as the Macedonian representative in the 2021 contest. On 16 February 2021, it was announced that Vasil would perform the song "Here I Stand", written and composed by Borce Kuzmanovski, Davor Jordanovski and Vasil himself. "Here I Stand" was presented to the public on 11 March 2021.

A piece of art shown in the music video of the song was interpreted as the Bulgarian flag by the Macedonian public. An interview where Garvanliev highlighted his Bulgarian citizenship also caused controversy. The controversy ensued in the background of the Bulgarian veto on the EU accession talks of North Macedonia over history and identity and the deterioration of Bulgaria–North Macedonia relations. As in the past singers from different ethnic origins have presented the country without ethnic disputes. Online petitions were initiated against him, demanding that he does not represent the country in the Eurovision. Some public figures, such as the former Macedonian prime minister Ljubčo Georgievski, defended him. Because of his gay sexual orientation, he was also subject to cyberbullying. On 23 March, the Bulgarian Ministry of Foreign Affairs summoned the Ambassador of North Macedonia in Sofia due to the controversy surrounding the case.

Regarding the video case, Garvanliev said the artwork shown "had no deliberate connection with the Bulgarian flag," as the "creation of the artist Janeta Vangeli is inspired by Jesus Christ." Because of the public pressure, the video was edited, removing the artwork. Following the controversy, a special commission from the Macedonian Radio Television was formed. They found nothing relevant and reaffirmed Garvanliev's participation in the Eurovision contest.

Garvanliev directly addressed fans with a video posted to his Facebook account: "I am a music ambassador, and in music there is no religion, politics, orientation, race or color. I had absolutely no intentions to hurt anybody. Quite the opposite!" Adding: "I do not apologize for being me... However, if I hurt anybody in any way, from the bottom of my heart... I am sorry. Forgive me." According to the public relations chief, he received over 400 threats in his social media profile. On the question of his dual citizenship Garvaliev later stated he is "Macedonian, born in Macedonia", and he considers himself as "one of the proudest Macedonians there is".

Vasil performed in the first semi-final of the contest on 18 May, but failed to qualify for the grand final. It was later revealed that he had placed 15th out of 16 contestants, scoring 23 points.

== Personal life ==
Garvanliev is a citizen of North Macedonia and Bulgaria. The latter is based on his grandmother's Bulgarian origin. He sought refuge at the age of ten in the United States after difficult conditions during the Kosovo War. He had a difficult life as his father, mother and brother were deported from the United States and had to return to Macedonia. Although initially Garvanliev was allowed to stay, when his father was jailed in Macedonia, he had to return as well in support. When he tried returning to the United States, the U.S. Embassy informed him he could not. His father arranged to work in Italy as a day worker picking vegetables and died there in 2005. Vasil later lived in Europe for music study mainly in Italy and the United Kingdom. He eventually settled for more than 10 years in Canada continuing classical music study and a career there. His mother and brother are both fashion designers and live in North Macedonia.

In May 2021, Garvanliev came out as gay in an interview with Attitude, adding that he came to terms with his sexuality as a high school student, and has been out to his friends and family for nearly two decades.

== Discography ==
=== Songs ===
- 1994: "Marionka" (in Macedonian Марионка)
- 2007: "Pomogni Mi" (in Macedonian Помогни Ми)
- 2018: "Gerdan" (in Macedonian Ѓердан)
- 2019: "Patuvam" (in Macedonian Патувам)
- 2020: "You" (Eurovision Song Contest 2020)
- 2020: "Mojata Ulica" (feat. Davor) (in Macedonian Мојата Улица)
- 2020: "PriKazna" (in Macedonian ПриКазна)
- 2021: "SudBina" (in Macedonian СудБина)
- 2021: "Here I Stand" (Eurovision Song Contest 2021)
- 2022: "Beautiful"
- 2022: "Dangerous Waters"
- 2022: "RHYTHM"

Awards and achievements
Preceded by Tamara Todevska with "Proud"	North Macedonia in the Eurovision Song Contest; 2020 (cancelled)	Succeeded by Himself with "Here I Stand"
Preceded by Himself with "You"	North Macedonia in the Eurovision Song Contest; 2021	Succeeded by Andrea with "Circles"
