= Monsters (Tamara Todevska song) =

2019 single by Tamara Todevska

Single by Tamara Todevska
- Released: 24 November 2019
- Length: 2:58
- Songwriter(s): Kosta Petrov
- Producer(s): Darko Dimitrov; Lazar Cvetkoski; Robert Bilbilov

Tamara Todevska singles chronology
"Proud" (2019)	"Monsters" (2019)

Music video
- "Monsters" on YouTube

"Monsters" is a song recorded by Macedonian singer and songwriter Tamara Todevska for her upcoming third studio album. It was written by Kosta Petrov and produced by Darko Dimitrov, Lazar Cvetkoski and Robert Bilbilov. The song was released as a single through Dimitrov on 24 November 2019.

Tamara performed the song for the first time at the 21st edition of Kënga Magjike on 24 November 2019. She performed the song for the second time in the second semi-final on 5 December 2019 and finished fifth overall in the grand final on 7 December 2019. She additionally won the award for the Best Big International Artist.

== See also ==
- Kënga Magjike 2019
