= North Macedonia in the Eurovision Song Contest =

- Eurovision Song Contest
- Participating broadcaster: Macedonian Radio Television (MRT)

Participation summary
- Appearances: 21 (9 finals)
- First appearance: 1998
- Last appearance: 2022
- Highest placement: 7th: 2019
- Participation history: ~~1996~~; 1997; 1998; 1999; 2000; 2001; 2002; 2003; 2004; 2005; 2006; 2007; 2008; 2009; 2010; 2011; 2012; 2013; 2014; 2015; 2016; 2017; 2018; 2019; ~~2020~~; 2021; 2022; 2023 – 2026

Related articles
- Skopje Fest
- North Macedonia's page at Eurovision.com
- For the most recent participation see North Macedonia in the Eurovision Song Contest 2022

North Macedonia (Note: Presented until the 2019 contest as the Former Yugoslav Republic of Macedonia (F.Y.R. Macedonia).) has been represented at the Eurovision Song Contest 21 times since its debut in 1998. The country had attempted to participate in 1996, but failed to qualify from the audio-only qualifying round. The Macedonian participating broadcaster in the contest is Macedonian Radio Television (MRT).

Having qualified from the semi-final round only once in ten of the previous eleven contests (2008–2018), North Macedonia achieved its best result to date in 2019, when "Proud" by Tamara Todevska qualified and finished in seventh place in the final after winning the jury vote; previously, its best result was with "Ninanajna" performed by Elena Risteska in 2006. Following a further two non-qualifications, MRT opted out of participating from 2023 to 2026. The country is set to return to the 2027 contest in Bulgaria.

== Participation ==
Macedonian Radio Television (MRT) has been a full member of the European Broadcasting Union (EBU) since 1 January 1993, thus eligible to participate in the Eurovision Song Contest since then. It has participated in the contest representing North Macedonia since its 43rd edition in 1998.

Before the country's independence in 1991 from SFR Yugoslavia, RTV Skopje –Yugoslav Radio Television's (JRT) affiliate in SR Macedonia, and MRT's predecessor– participated in the Yugoslav pre-selection called among the JRT affiliates from the other Yugoslav federal units. Also, Macedonian composers wrote songs for candidates from other parts of Yugoslavia. However, the only Macedonian win in the Yugoslav competition, "Vraćam se" by Maja Odžaklievska in 1980, did not compete in the Eurovision Song Contest 1980 due to JRT's decision not to participate that year. SR Macedonia was the only Yugoslav federal state that never sent a Yugoslav entry to the Eurovision Song Contest.

Until 2019, the country was presented under the provisional appellation "F.Y.R. Macedonia" at the contest due to the Macedonia naming dispute; in 2006, when the contest was held in Athens, the full version "former Yugoslav Republic of Macedonia" was used. The name North Macedonia has been adopted since 2019, following the signing of the Prespa Agreement which settled the dispute.

== History ==
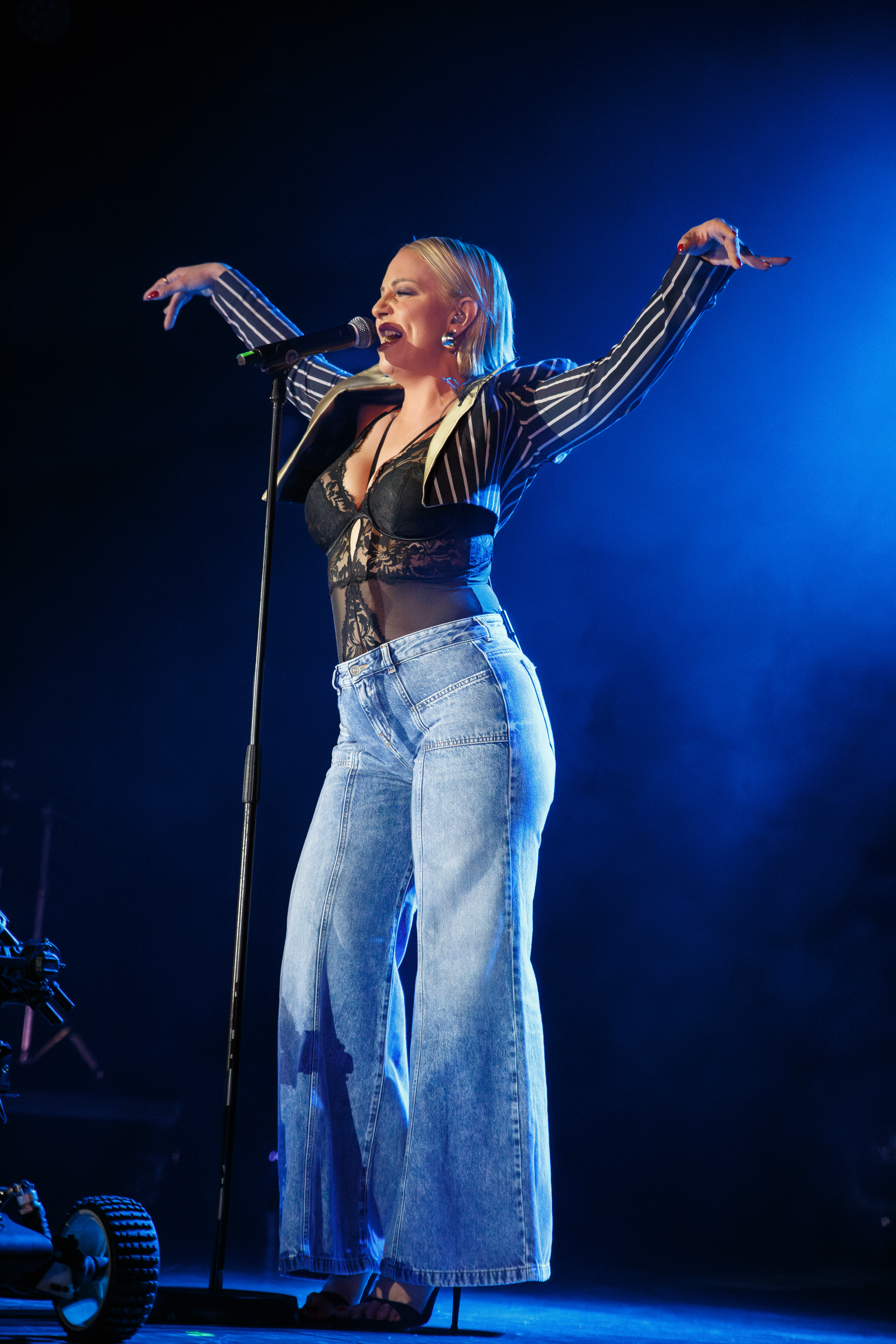
Tamara Todevska became the highest scoring Macedonian entrant in the contest with the song "Proud", which finished in seventh position at the 2019 contest, winning the jury vote.

MRT submitted its first entry, "Samo ti" sung by Kaliopi, for the 1996 contest. However, the country failed to qualify through the non-broadcast pre-selection round. Its efforts to enter the contest were again hindered in 1997, when another new system was introduced where countries with the lowest average scores over the previous four years were excluded from participating. The country made its debut in 1998, with "Ne zori, zoro" by Vlado Janevski.

The country's best result before 2019 (and the best result with its old name) was in 2006, with "Ninanajna" by Elena Risteska in Athens, who came 12th. It is the only country to have qualified from every semi-final from 2004 to 2007 (other countries have qualified for every final but due to them finishing in the top 10 the previous year, they did not have to compete in the semi-final). Despite never finishing in the top 10, their record of qualifying for every final was broken in 2008, when the jury vote used in the semi-final chose Sweden as a finalist, despite Tamara, Vrčak and Adrian having come 10th in the televote.

MRT has intermittently used the Skopje Fest to select the national entry since the country's debut, although it made several changes in the national final format, so the 2004, 2005, and 2006 national finals were organised outside the Skopje Fest.

For 2019, the country competed for the first time under the name North Macedonia. MRT selected "Proud" by Tamara Todevska as their act of choice. The song managed to qualify through the second semi-final, and reached seventh place in the final, winning the jury vote. This is the first top ten placing as well as the highest placing ever for North Macedonia in the history of the contest.

Following two non-qualifications in 2021 and 2022, MRT opted not to take part between 2023 and 2026 mostly due to financial constraints. On 21 May 2026, MRT director Zoran Ristoski stated that the broadcaster intends to return to the contest in 2027 in neighbouring Bulgaria, which was confirmed on 14 September.

== Participation overview ==
Table key
2	Second place
◇	Entry selected but did not compete
†	Upcoming event

Year	Artist	Song	Language	Final	Points	Semi	Points
1996	Kaliopi ◇	"Samo ti" (Само ти) ◇	Macedonian ◇	Failed to qualify (Note: In order to reduce the number of participating countries at the 1996 event a qualifying round was held among all countries except the hosts. Macedonia failed to progress from this round; entries which failed to progress have subsequently been discounted by the EBU and do not feature as part of the countries' list of appearances.)		26	14
1998	Vlado Janevski	"Ne zori, zoro" (Не зори, зоро)	Macedonian	19	16	No semi-finals	
2000	XXL	"100% te ljubam" (100% те љубам)	Macedonian, English	15	29	No semi-finals	
2002	Karolina	"Od nas zavisi" (Од нас зависи)	Macedonian	19	25	No semi-finals	
2004	Toše Proeski	"Life"	English	14	47	10	71
2005	Martin Vučić	"Make My Day"	English	17	52	9	97
2006	Elena Risteska	"Ninanajna" (Нинанајна)	English, Macedonian	12	56	10	76
2007	Karolina	"Mojot svet" (Мојот свет)	Macedonian, English	14	73	9	97
2008	Tamara, Vrčak and Adrijan	"Let Me Love You"	English	Failed to qualify		10 (Note: Whilist the 10th place would have been enough to qualify in previous and upcoming years, in 2008 and 2009 the top nine countries in each semi-final as determined by televoting qualified automatically, with the tenth place determined based on the votes of the back-up juries among the remaining countries. This resulted in Sweden and Finland advancing to the final instead of Macedonia in 2008 and 2009 respectively.)	64
2009	Next Time	"Nešto što kje ostane" (Нешто што ќе остане)	Macedonian	Failed to qualify		10	45
2010	Gjoko Taneski	"Jas ja imam silata" (Јас ја имам силата)	Macedonian	Failed to qualify		15	37
2011	Vlatko Ilievski	"Rusinka" (Русинкa)	Macedonian, English	Failed to qualify		16	36
2012	Kaliopi	"Crno i belo" (Црно и бело)	Macedonian	13	71	9	53
2013	Esma and Lozano	"Pred da se razdeni" (Пред да се раздени)	Macedonian, Romani	Failed to qualify		16	28
2014	Tijana	"To the Sky"	English	Failed to qualify		13	33
2015	Daniel Kajmakoski	"Autumn Leaves"	English	Failed to qualify		15	28
2016	Kaliopi	"Dona" (Дона)	Macedonian	Failed to qualify		11	88
2017	Jana Burčeska	"Dance Alone"	English	Failed to qualify		15	69
2018	Eye Cue	"Lost and Found"	English	Failed to qualify		18	24
2019	Tamara Todevska	"Proud"	English	7	305	2	239
2020	Vasil ◇	"You" ◇	English ◇	Contest cancelled (Note: The 2020 contest was cancelled due to the COVID-19 pandemic.)			
2021	Vasil	"Here I Stand"	English	Failed to qualify		15	23
2022	Andrea	"Circles"	English	Failed to qualify		11	76
2027	Confirmed intention to participate †						

== Awards ==
=== Barbara Dex Award ===
Year	Performer	Host city	Ref.
2005	Martin Vučić	(Ukraine) Kyiv	
2018	Eye Cue	(Portugal) Lisbon	

== Related involvement ==
=== Delegation members ===
Each participating broadcaster in the Eurovision Song Contest assigns a head of delegation as the EBU's contact person and the leader of their delegation at the event. The delegation, whose size can greatly vary, includes a head of press, the performers, songwriters, composers, and backing vocalists, among others.

==== Heads of delegation ====
Year	Head of delegation	Ref.
2005	Ivan Mircevski	
2012–2022	Meri Popova	
2027	Aleksandra Jovanovska and Jana Burčeska	

==== Heads of press ====
Year	Head of press	Ref.
2019	Toni Cifrovski	

==== Heads of media ====
Year	Head of media	Ref.
2027	Jana Burčeska	

=== Commentators and spokespersons ===
For the show's broadcast on MRT, various commentators have provided commentary on the contest in the Macedonian language. At the Eurovision Song Contest after all points are calculated, the presenters of the show call upon each voting country to invite each respective spokesperson to announce the results of their vote on-screen.

From 1961 until 1991, SR Macedonia was part of Yugoslavia and JRT's affiliate RTV Skopje broadcast the contest there with Macedonian commentary.

Year	Channel	Commentator(s)	Spokesperson	Ref.
1998	MTV	Unknown	Evgenija Teodosievska	
1999	MTV	Unknown	Did not participate	
2000	MTV	Unknown	Sandra Todorovska	
2001	MTV	Unknown	Did not participate	
2002	MTV	Unknown	Biljana Debarlieva	
2003	MTV	Unknown	Did not participate	
2004	MTV	Unknown	Karolina Petkovska	
2005	MTV	Unknown	Karolina Gočeva	
2006	MTV	Karolina Petkovska	Martin Vučić	
2007	MTV 1 (all shows)	Unknown	Elena Risteska	
2008	MRT (all shows)	Unknown	Ognen Janeski	
2009	MRT (all shows)	Karolina Petkovska and Aleksandra Jovanovska	Frosina Josifovska	
2010	MRT (all shows)	Karolina Petkovska	Milica Roštikjl	
2011	MTV 1 (all shows)	Eli Tanaskovska	Kristina Talevska	
2012	MRT 1 (all shows)	Karolina Petkovska	Kristina Talevska	
2013	MRT 1 (all shows)	Karolina Petkovska	Dimitar Atanasovski	
2014	MRT 1, MRT SAT, Radio Skopje (all shows)	Karolina Petkovska	Marko Mark	
2015	MRT 1, MRT SAT, Radio Skopje, MRT 2, MRT 2 SAT (all shows)	Karolina Petkovska	Marko Mark	
2016	MRT 1 (all shows)	Karolina Petkovska	Dijana Gogova	
2017	MRT 1 (all shows)	Karolina Petkovska	Ilija Grujoski	
2018	MRT 1, MRT 2, Radio Skopje (all shows)	Karolina Petkovska	Jana Burčeska	
2019	MRT 1 (all shows)	Toni Cifrovski	Nikola Trajkovski	
2020	Not announced before cancellation			N/A
2021	MRT 1, MRT 2 (all shows)	Eli Tanaskovska	Vane Markoski	
2022	MRT 1, MRT 2 (all shows)	Eli Tanaskovska	Jana Burčeska	
2023	MRT 1, MRT 2, Radio Skopje (all shows)	Aleksandra Jovanovska and Eli Tanaskovska	Did not participate	
2024	MRT 1, Radio Skopje (all shows)	Aleksandra Jovanovska	Did not participate	
2025	MRT 1, Radio Skopje (all shows)	Aleksandra Jovanovska	Did not participate	
2026	MRT 1, Radio Skopje (all shows) (Note: Provided Macedonian language commentary.)	Eli Tanaskovska	Did not participate	
2026	MRT 2, MR 3 (all shows) (Note: Provided Albanian language commentary.)	Vjosa Miftari and Ardita Imeri	Did not participate	

==== Other shows ====
Show	Commentator	Channel	Ref.
Eurovision: Europe Shine a Light	Aleksandra Jovanovska	MRT 1	

== Photo gallery ==
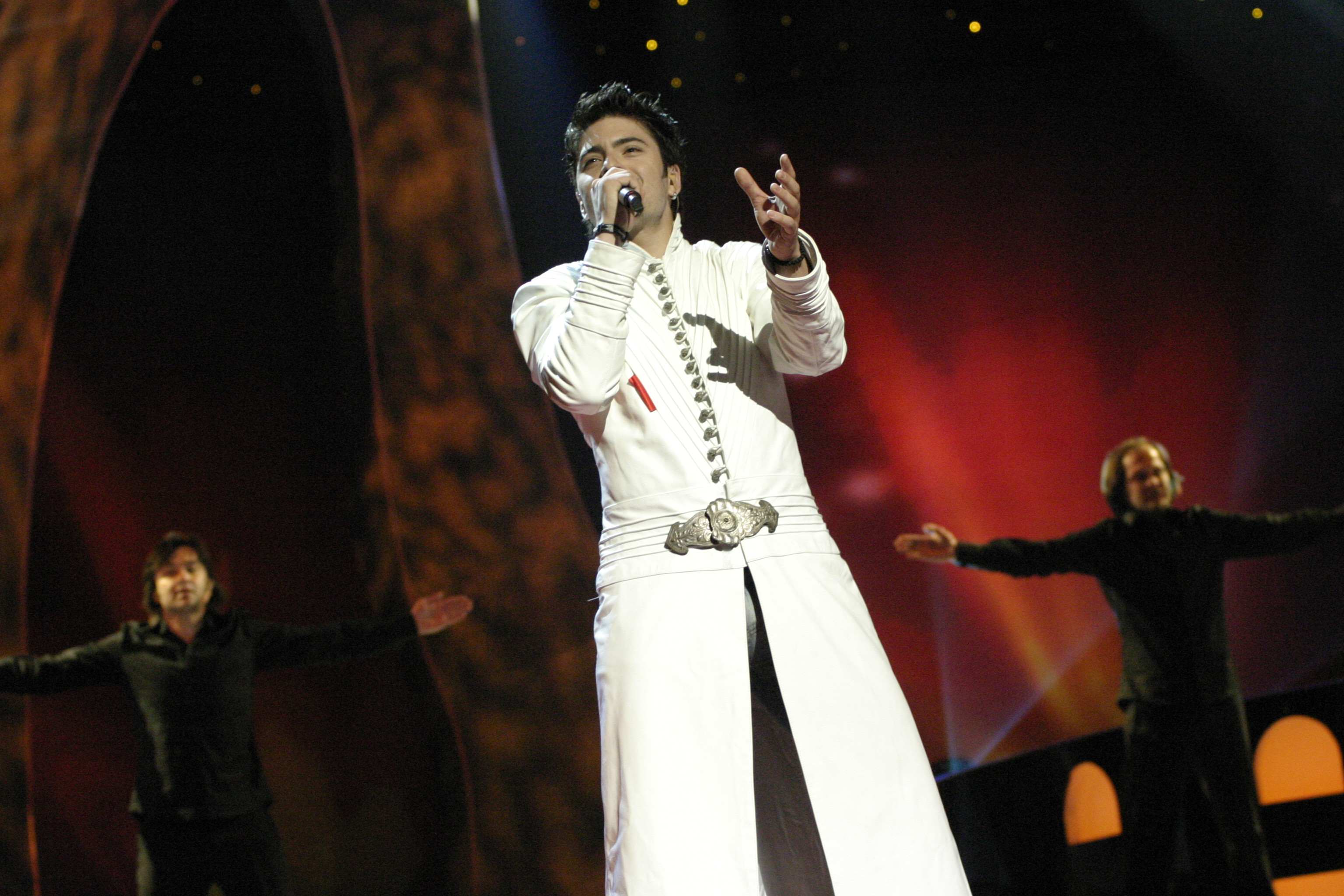
Toše Proeski in Istanbul (2004)

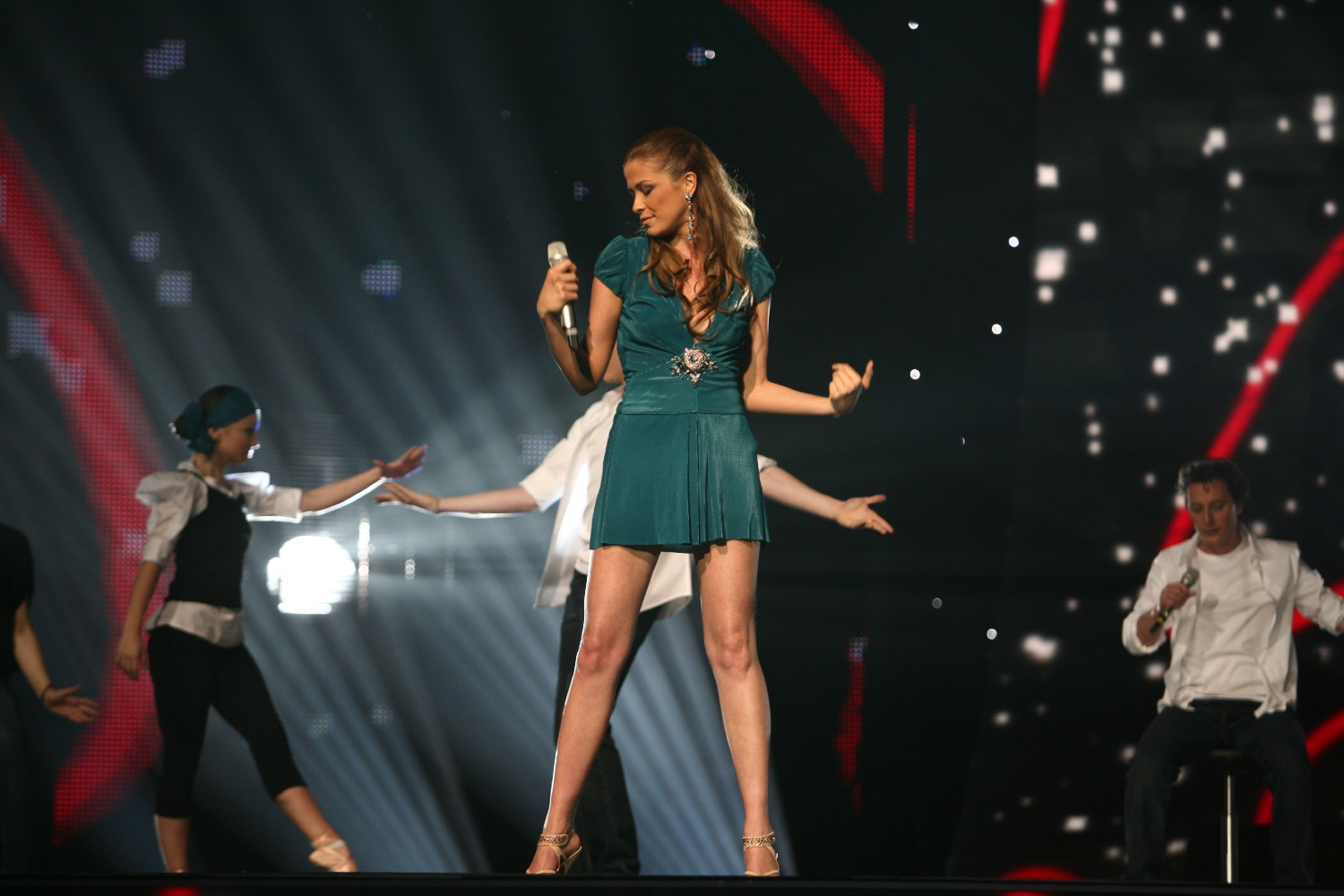
Karolina Gočeva in Helsinki (2007)

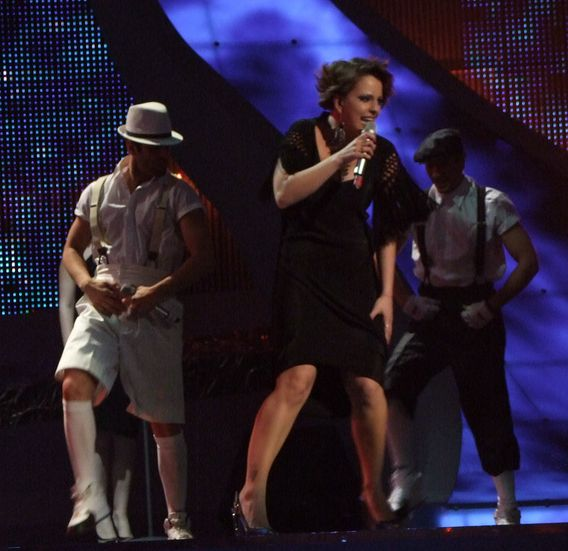
Tamara, Vrčak and Adrian in Belgrade (2008)

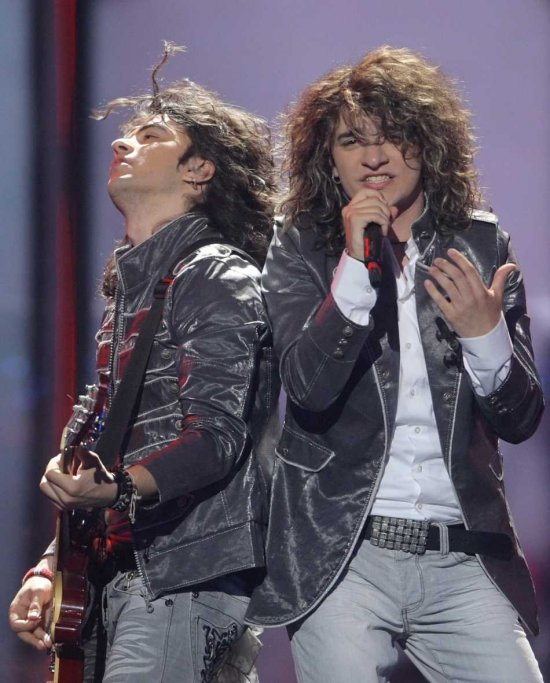
Next Time in Moscow (2009)

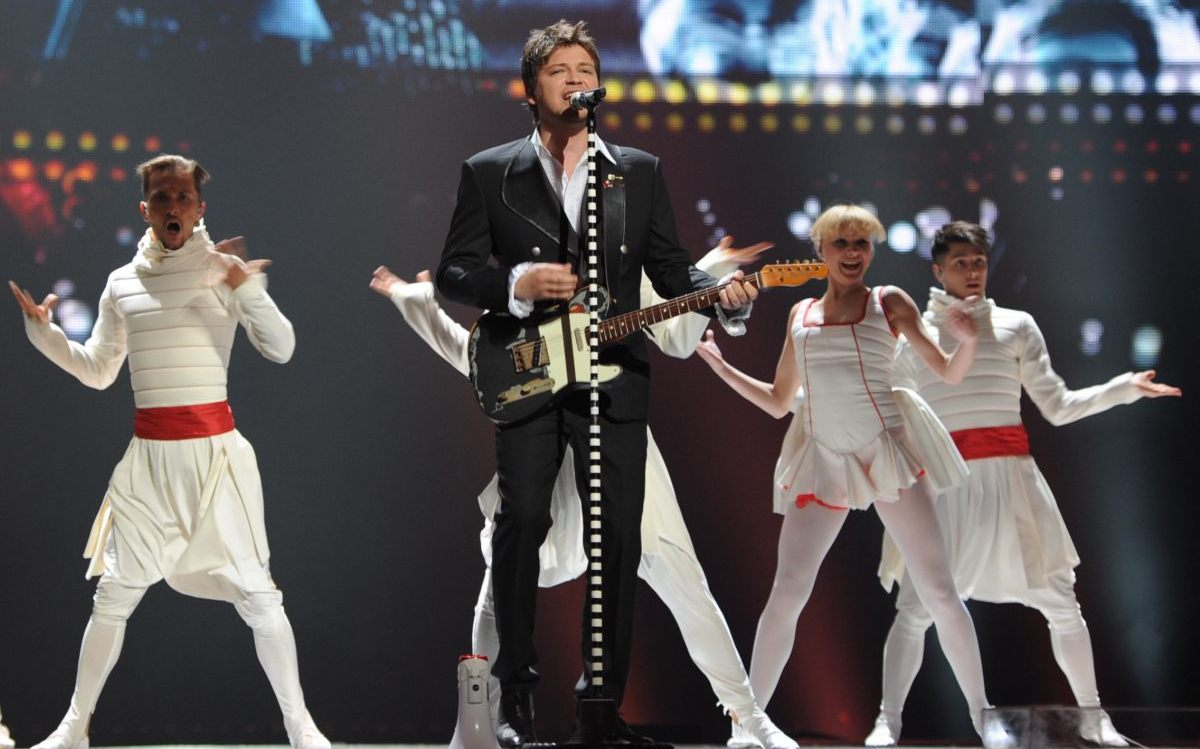
Vlatko Ilievski in Düsseldorf (2011)

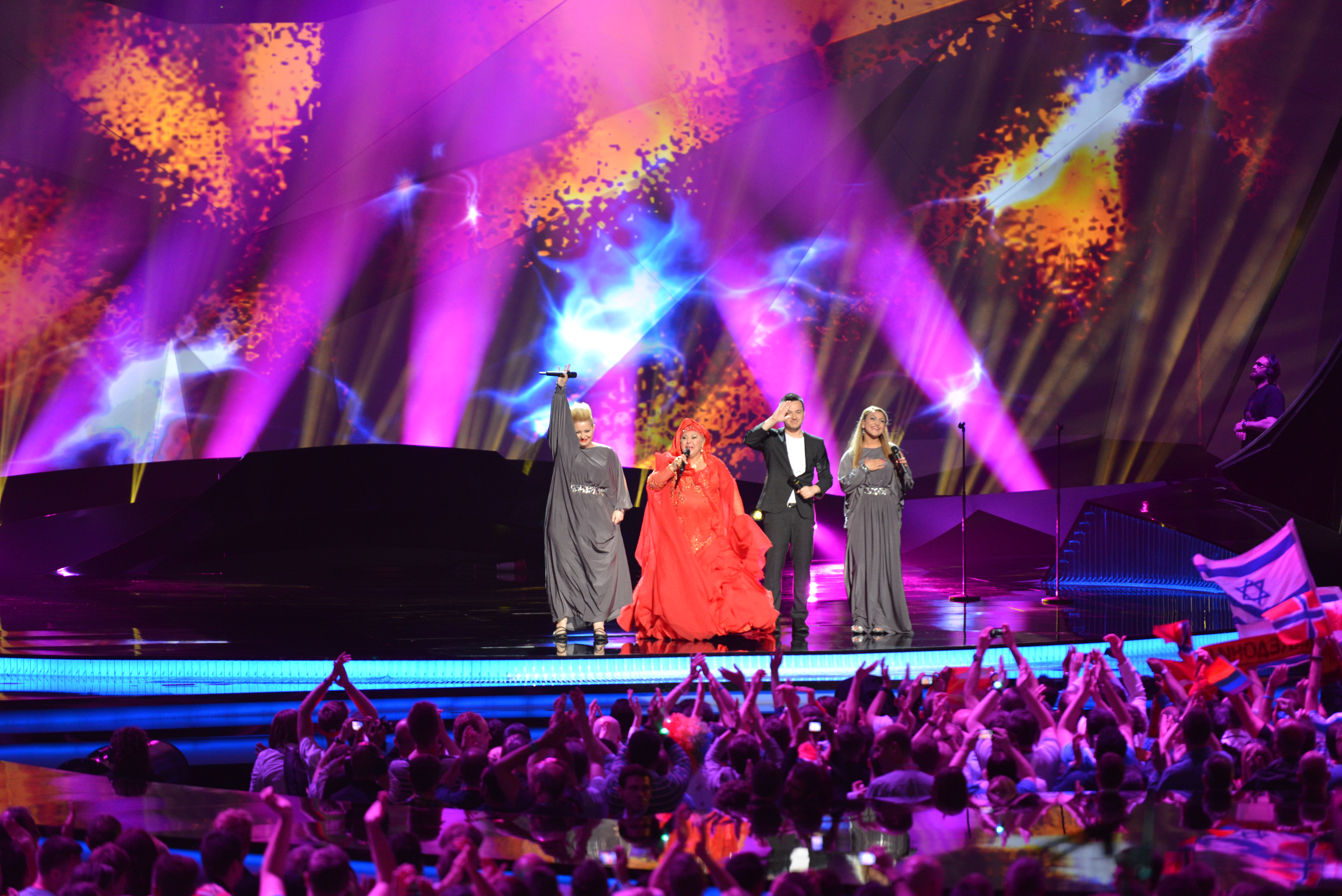
Esma Redžepova and Vlatko Lozanoski in Malmö (2013)

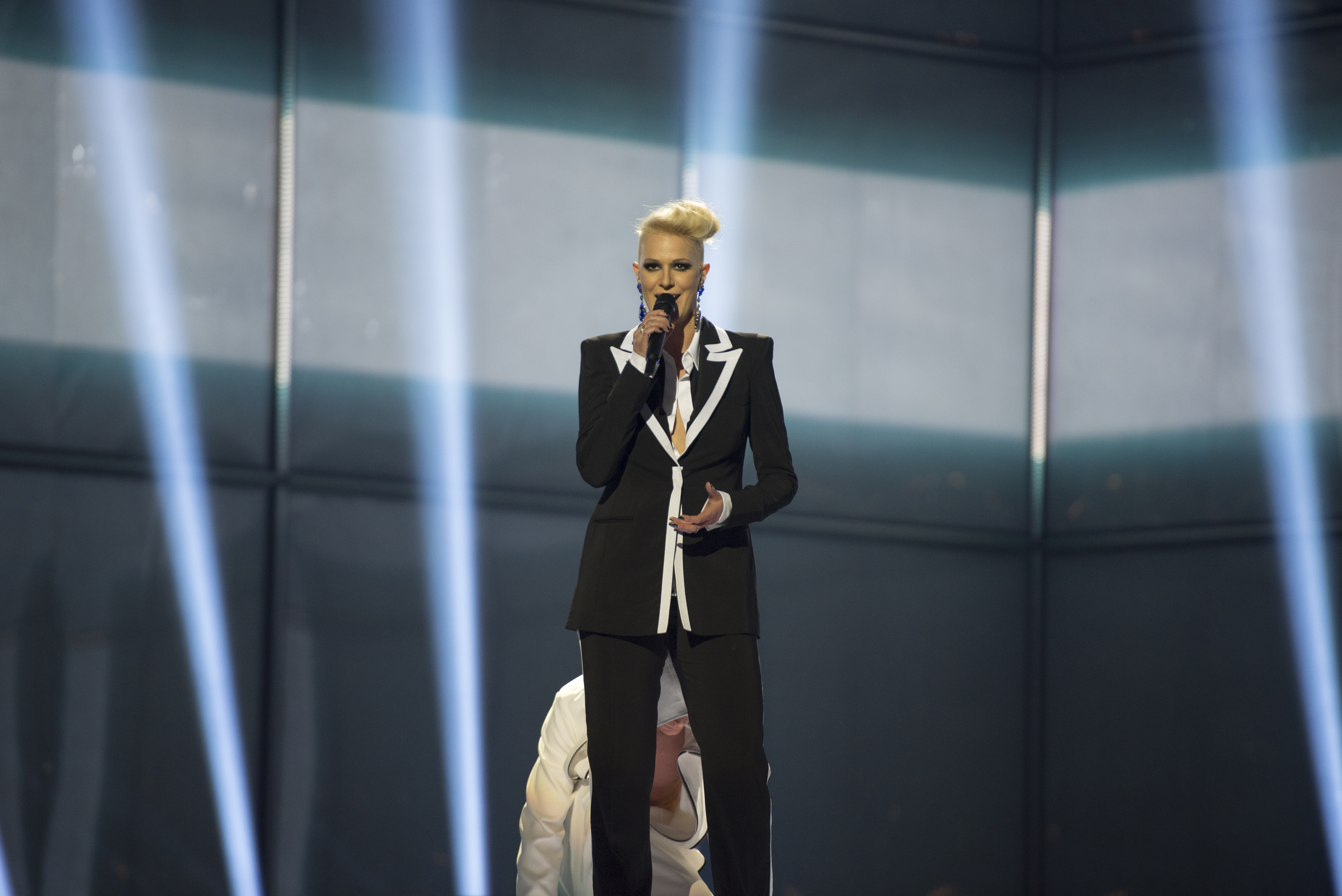
Tijana in Copenhagen (2014)

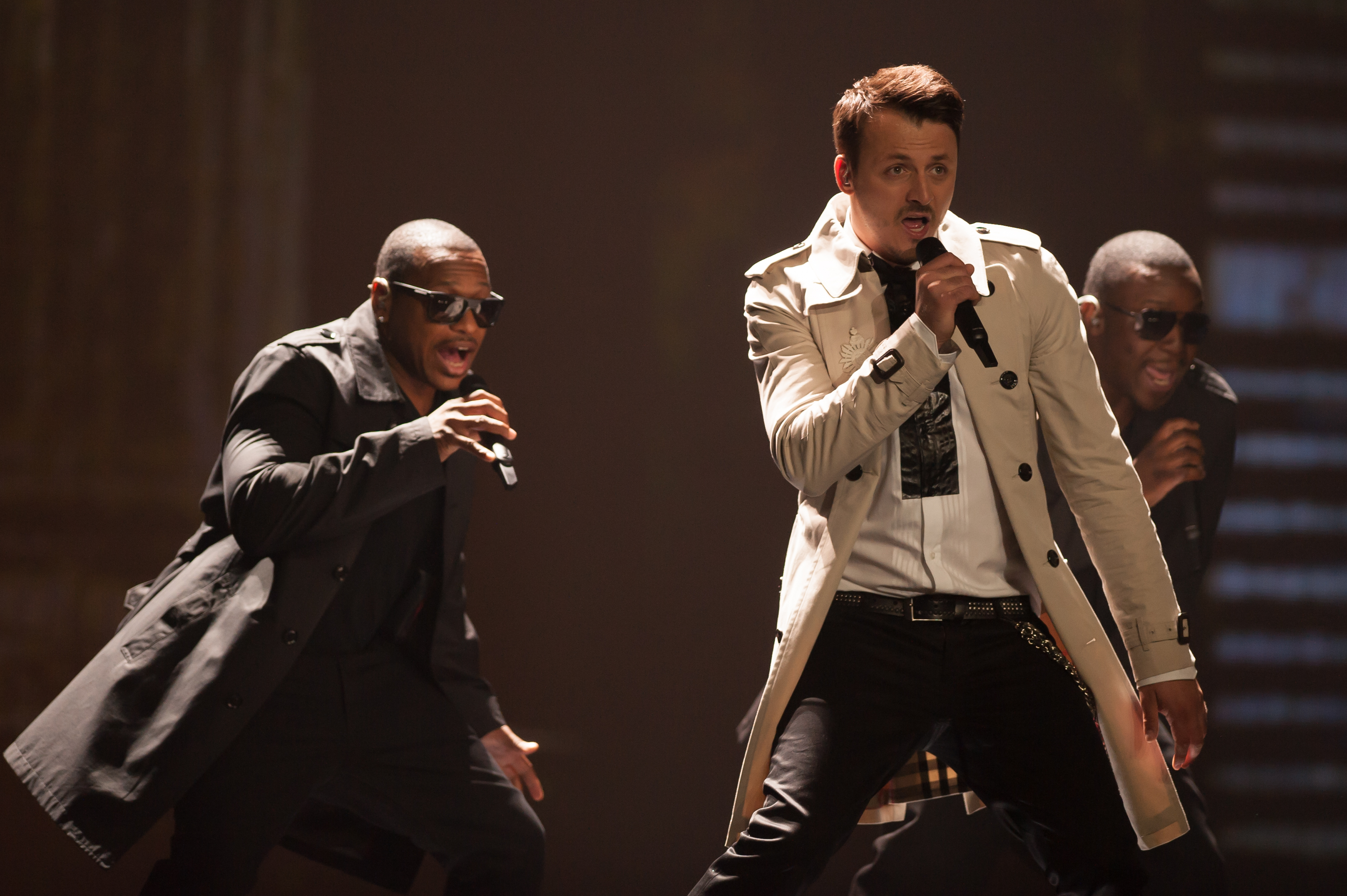
Daniel Kajmakoski in Vienna (2015)

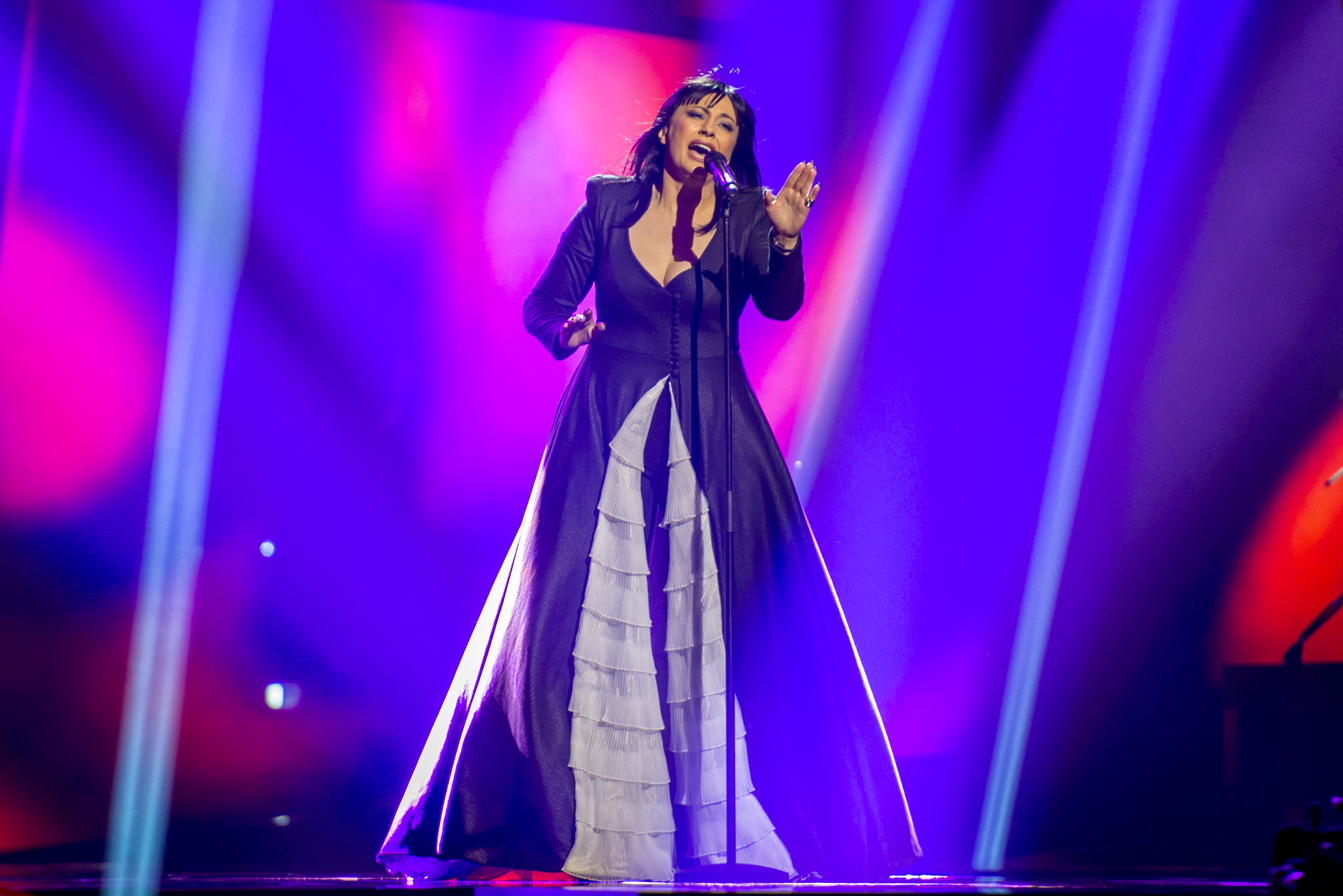
Kaliopi in Stockholm (2016)

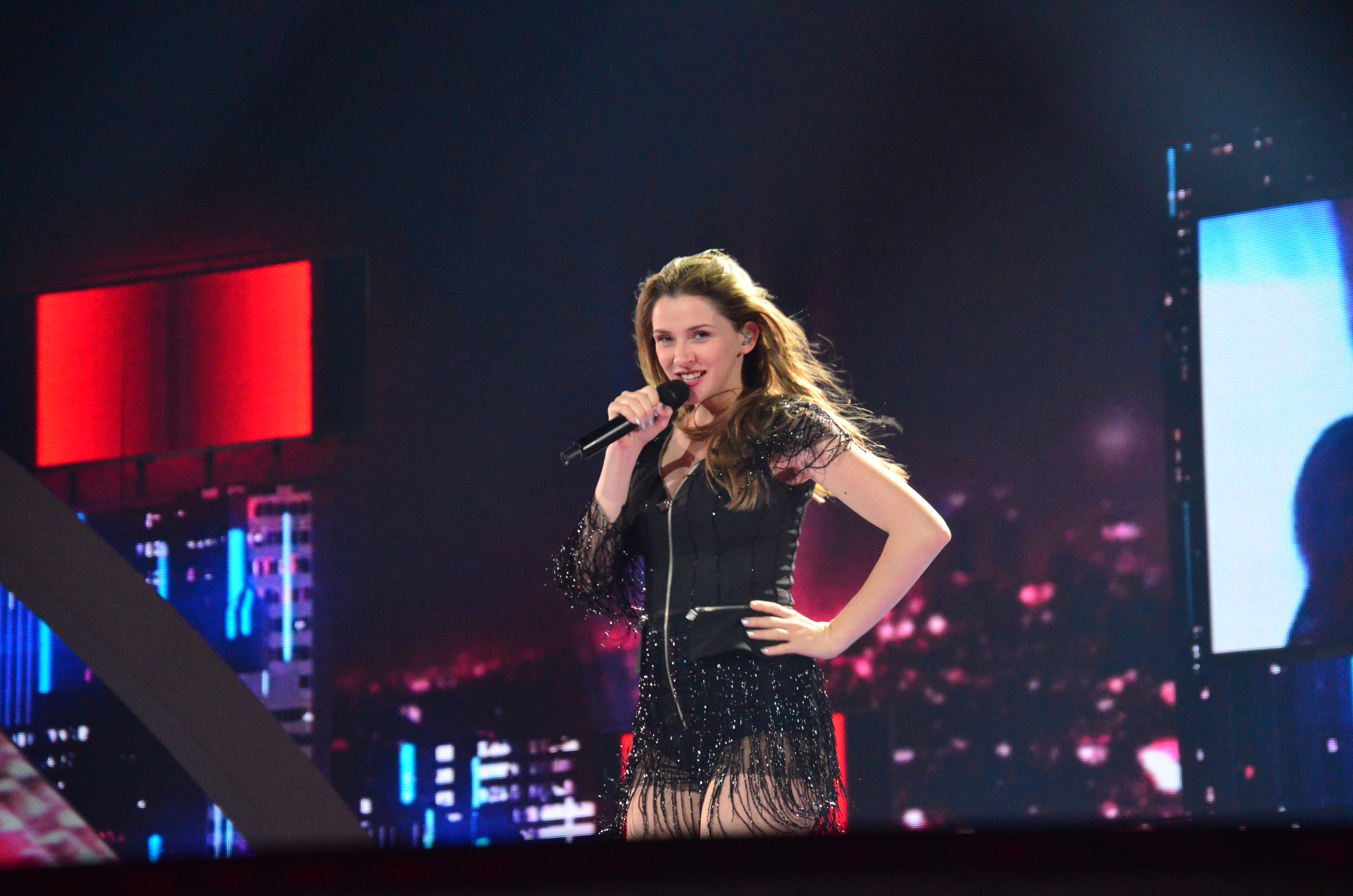
Jana Burčeska in Kyiv (2017)

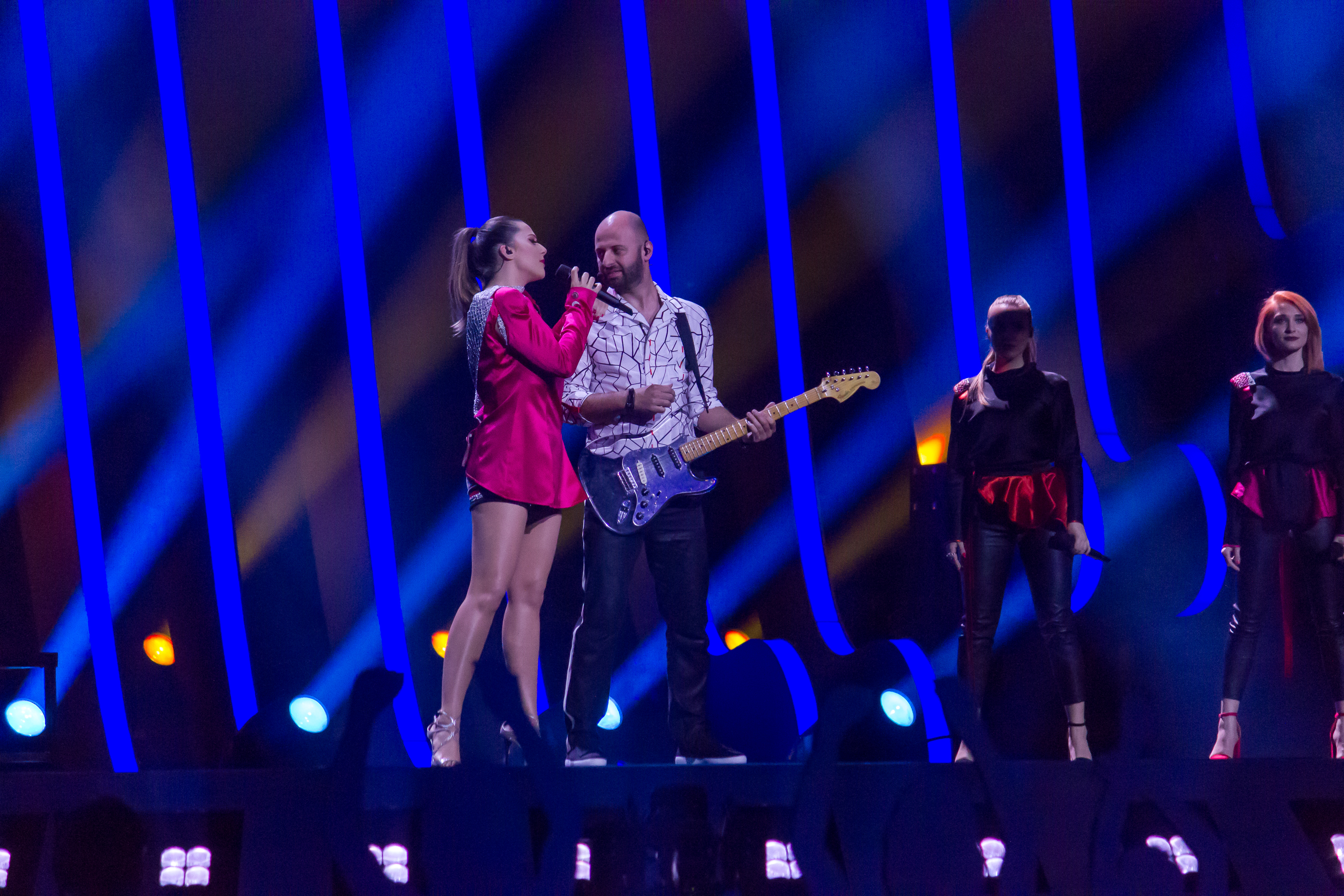
Eye Cue in Lisbon (2018)

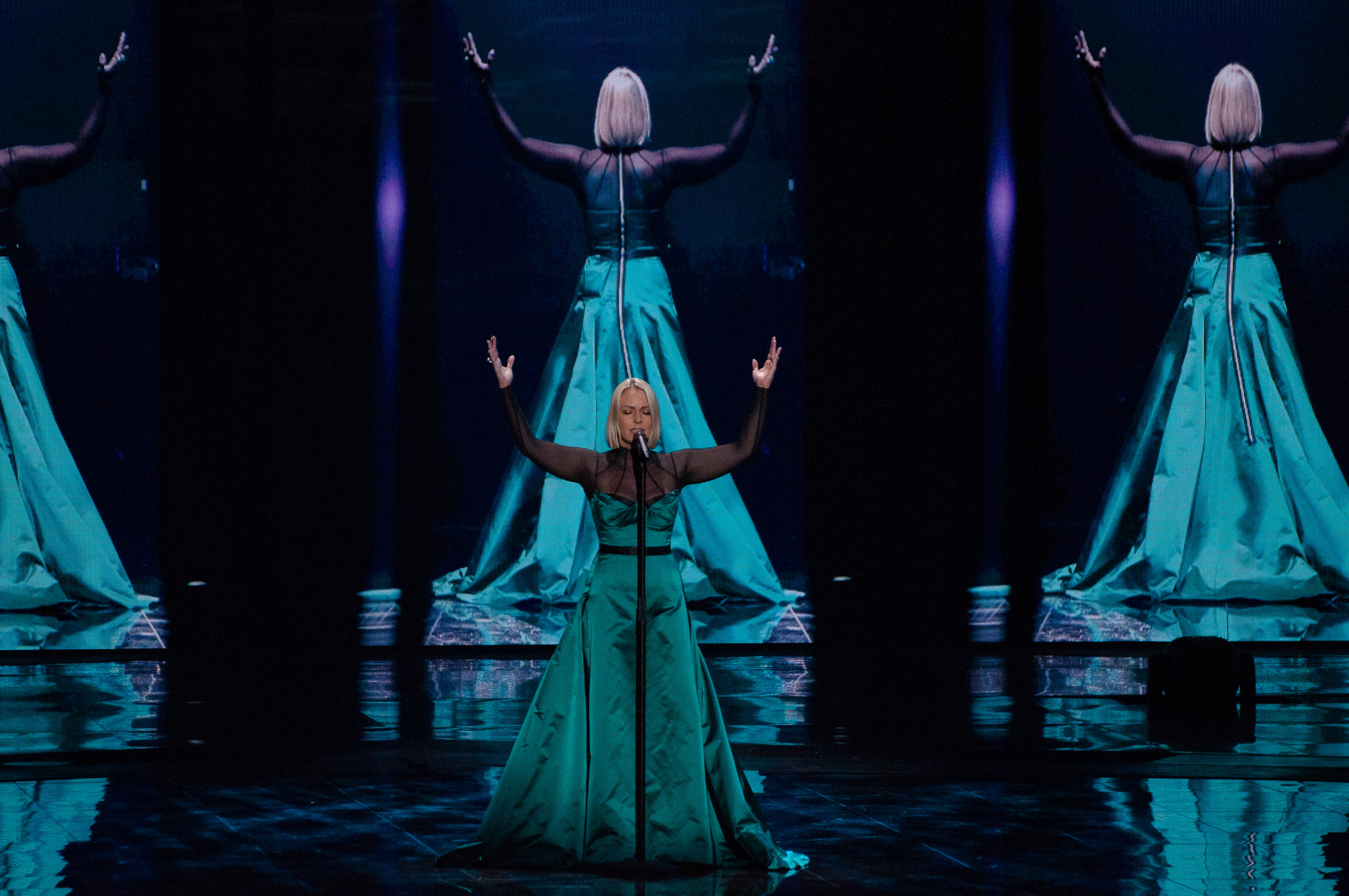
Tamara Todevska in Tel Aviv (2019)

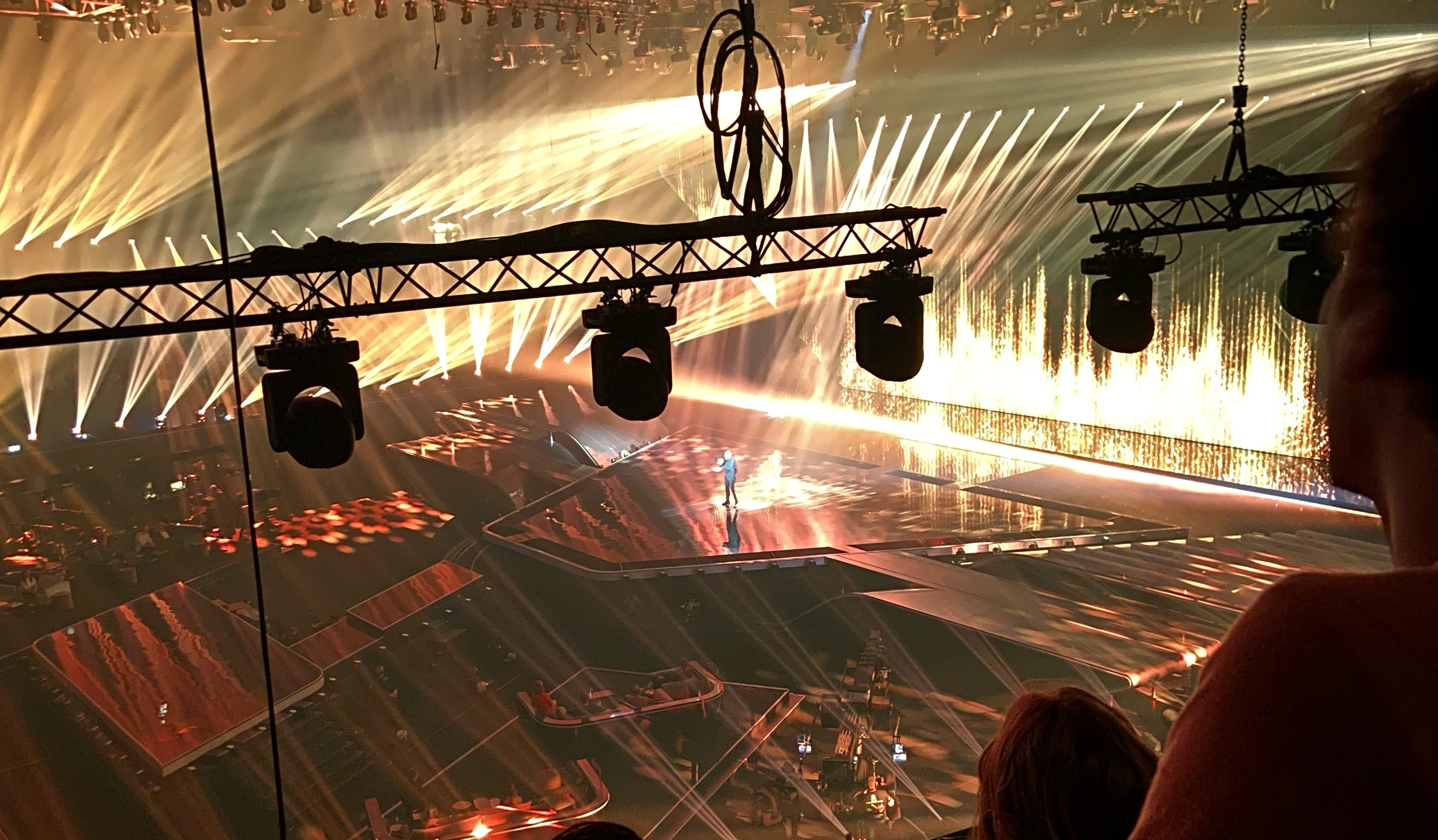
Vasil in Rotterdam (2021)

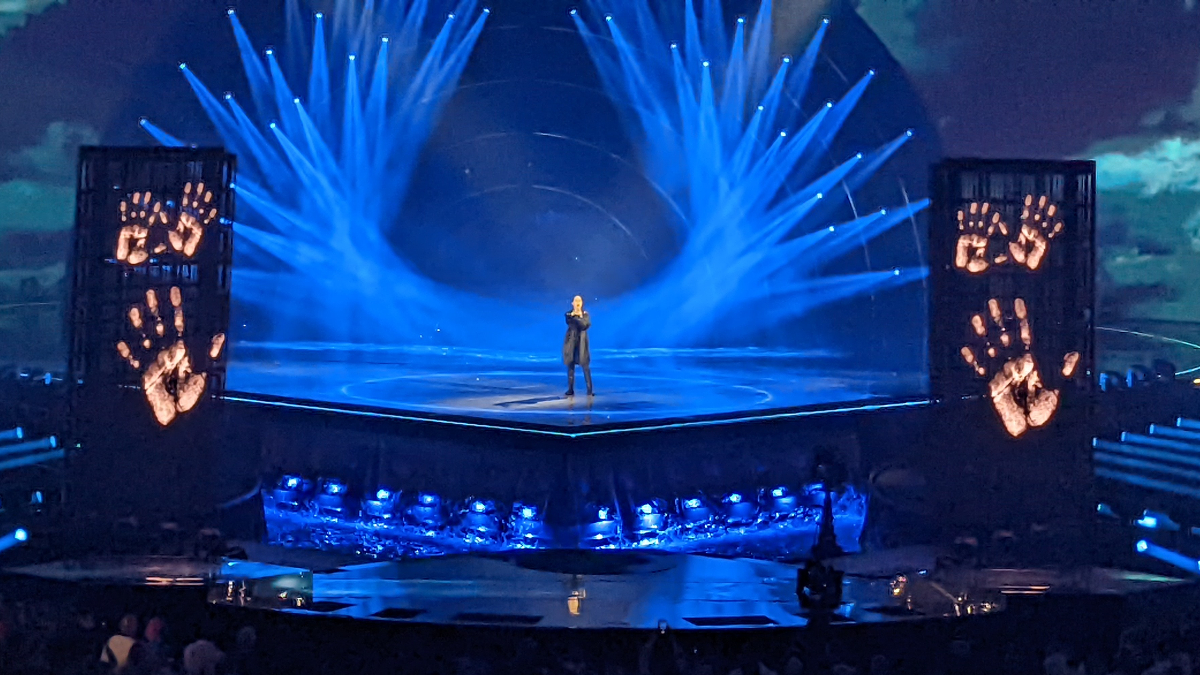
Andrea in Turin (2022)

== See also ==
- North Macedonia in the Junior Eurovision Song Contest
