= Here I Stand (Vasil Garvanliev song) =

2021 Eurovision song by Vasil Garvanliev

Single by Vasil Garvanliev
- Released: 12 March 2021
- Length: 3:00
- Label: Megaforce
- Songwriter: Vasil Garvanliev
- Producers: Borche Kuzmanovski; Davor Jordanovski

Vasil Garvanliev singles chronology
"SudBina" (2021)	"Here I Stand" (2021)

Music video
- "Here I Stand" on YouTube

Eurovision Song Contest 2021 entry
- Country: North Macedonia
- Artist: Vasil Garvanliev
- Composers: Borche Kuzmanovski; Vasil Garvanliev; Davor Jordanovski
- Lyricists: Borche Kuzmanovski; Vasil Garvanliev; Davor Jordanovski

Finals performance
- Semi-final result: 15th
- Semi-final points: 23

Entry chronology
- ◄ "You" (2020)
- "Circles" (2022) ►

"Here I Stand" is a song by Macedonian singer Vasil Garvanliev. The song represented North Macedonia in the Eurovision Song Contest 2021 in Rotterdam, the Netherlands, after being internally selected by the national broadcaster Macedonian Radio Television (MRT). It did not qualify for the final on 22 May 2021.

== Background and composition ==
"Here I Stand" was arranged and produced by Garvanliev alongside Macedonian musicians Borche Kuzamovski and Davor Jordanovski.

== Release and promotion ==
In March 2021, following the release of Garvanliev's music video for Eurovision 2021 a controversy arose. The reason was a piece of art in the venue where the music video was shot that resembled the colors of the Bulgarian flag. Furthermore, Garvanliev has confirmed he holds Bulgarian citizenship, due to his grandmother's origin. Because of the public pressure the video was eventually edited by Garvanliev. Although in the past North Macedonia was presented on Eurovision from people with diverse ethnic backgrounds in this case the Macedonian Radio Television formed a special commission to decide whether Garvanliev should withdraw from Eurovision Song Contest over claims he had spread "Bulgarian propaganda". According to Balkan Insight, this is the first time that the Eurovision has seen such an 'ethnically heated dispute'. The intense dispute was due to the worsened Bulgaria–North Macedonia relations then.

Garvanliev gave an interview to the Macedonian newspaper Sloboden Pechat, in which he said the artwork in the video "had no deliberate connection with the Bulgarian flag", adding that the triptych artwork in the video is a "creation of the author Janeta Vangeli and is inspired by Jesus Christ. The Bulgarian flag [colors] are horizontal". The artwork involved is displayed in the Daut Pasha bath where the video was shot and involves three vertical panels of cream, green and a rusty orange colour. To some, this was a little too similar to the Bulgarian flag, which involves horizontal stripes of white, green and red. Garvaliev declared to Slobodan Pechat: "The gallery has a beautiful display of works of art and no one involved in the video was allowed to interfere with them." Garvanliev also directly addressed fans with a video posted to his Facebook account. Speaking in Macedonian, he clearly explained his stance on the situation. In the post caption, he wrote: "I am a music ambassador, and in music there is no religion, politics, orientation, race or color. I had absolutely no intentions to hurt anybody. Quite the opposite!" adding: "I am so proud of this project which not only embodies me, but my country and culture – musicians and featured artists in the gallery. I do not apologise for being me. I never will – I didn't have a choice in that. However, if I hurt anybody in any way, from the bottom of my heart... I am sorry. Forgive me." The Macedonian broadcaster in a later montage of the official music video removed the scenes where the disputed artwork appears. MRT's commission decided that Garvanliev would remain as the representative.

== At Eurovision ==
=== Internal selection ===
On 20 January 2021, Macedonian Radio Television (MRT) announced Macedonian singer Vasil Garvanliev as the country's representative for the Eurovision Song Contest 2021.

=== Rotterdam ===
The 65th edition of the Eurovision Song Contest is taking place in Rotterdam, the Netherlands and consists of two semi-finals on 18 May and 20 May 2021, and the grand final on 22 May 2021. According to the Eurovision rules, all participating countries, except the host nation and the "Big Five", consisting of France, Germany, Italy, Spain and the United Kingdom, are required to qualify from one of two semi-finals to compete for the final, although the top 10 countries from the respective semi-final progress to the grand final. On 17 November 2020, it was announced that North Macedonia would be performing in the first half of the first semi-final of the contest. The song did not quality for the final, to be held on 22 May 2021.

== Release history ==
Release history for "Here I Stand"
Region	Date	Format(s)	Label	Ref.
Various	12 March 2021	Digital download; streaming	Megaforce	
