= Kënga Magjike 2019 =

21st edition of Festivali i Këngës

Dates and venue
- Semi-final 1: 4 December 2019
- Semi-final 2: 5 December 2019
- Final: 7 December 2019
- Venue: Pallati i Kongreseve, Tirana

Organisation
- Host broadcaster: Televizioni Klan (TV Klan)
- Presenters: Adrola Dushi; Ardit Gjebrea

Participants
- Number of entries: 47

Vote
- Voting system: Each contestant awards 30 points to their favourite songs. A total of 150 points will be given from the professional jury and 300 points from the public.
- Winning song: "Ma Zgjat Dorën" by Eneda Tarifa

The Kënga Magjike 2019 was the 21st edition of the annual music contest Kënga Magjike and was held on 4, 5 and 7 December 2019 at the Pallati i Kongreseve in Tirana broadcast live on Televizioni Klan (TV Klan). Ardit Gjebrea and Adrola Dushi were the hosts of the three live shows. The proceeds from the ticket sales was donated to the people affected by the 2019 earthquake in Albania. Anna Oxa, as she stated, bought a ticket and sat with the public in the first semi-final as an act of solidarity.

The winner of this year's edition was Eneda Tarifa with the song titled "Ma Zgjat Dorën". It was her first victory after two previous participations in 2006 and 2008.

== Format ==
Kënga Magjike 2019, organised by Televizioni Klan (TV Klan), was the twenty-first consecutive edition of the annual contest. The two semi-finals and grand final were held at the Pallati i Kongreseve in Tirana on 4, 5 and 7 December 2019.

== Contestants ==
The contestants of this year's edition of Kënga Magjike were presented on the TV Klan live broadcast "E Diela Shqiptare" on every Sunday beginning from the 22 September 2019 until 1 December 2019 hosted by Ardit Gjebrea. The contestants who were qualified for the semi-finals were announced on 1 December 2019 at "E Diela Shqiptare".

The participating artists and bands are divided into two broader categories such as the Big Artists and New Artists. The New Artists perform live in front of a jury while the Big Artists are automatically qualified for the semi-finals. The jury was composed of Enkel Demi, Arben Skenderi, Armend Rexhepagiqi, Jonida Maliqi, Dj Missrose and Dj Stone.

Key: Qualified for the semi-finals Withdrawn

Artist(s)	Song	Language
22 September 2019
Lindita	"Want My Love"	English, Albanian
Genti Deda	"Nuk Ta Fal"	Albanian
Rea Nuhu	"Për Mua"	Albanian
Khuba	"Ndryshe"	Albanian
Sisma	"Com'e' Possibile"	Italian
29 September 2019
Erik Lloshi	"Zhgenjimin Kisha"	Albanian
Elia	"Plagë Shpirti"	Albanian
Korab Shaqiri	"Fenomen"	Albanian
Alex Alexander	"Breaking Down The Wall"	English
Laura & Elisa	"Nënë"	Albanian
Kristi	"Pa Faj"	Albanian
6 October 2019
Rovena Dilo ft. Hitman & Rolla	"Cinderella"	Albanian
Dylan	"A Mjaftoj Une Pa Ty"	Albanian
Inis Neziri	"Ishe Ti"	Albanian
Donat Makolli	"Stop"	Albanian
Glejvis	"13"	Albanian
13 October 2019
Mar Shine	"Dejarte Atrás"	Spanish
Voltan Prodani	"Dashuri Virtuale"	Albanian
Olsi Bylyku	"Ma Kthe"	Albanian
Marjona Metohu	"Bosh"	Albanian
Andreas Dracopoulos	"Mono Dipla Sou"	Greek
Klea Kasemi	"Endacake Zemre"	Albanian
20 October 2019
Endri & Stefi Prifti	"Zemra Ime Ështe Gjallë"	Albanian
Aldo Bradhi	"Gabim"	Albanian
Ardit Cuni	"Frymë"	Albanian
Jetmir Kanani	"Të Fundit Here"	Albanian
Gennaro Modestino	"I Will Be"	English
Maria Kiou	"Mallon Trelenomai"	Greek
Red Carpet	"Hija Jote"	Albanian
27 October 2019
Anxhela Peristeri	"Dikush I Imi"	Albanian
Vitmar Basha	"Largoji Rete"	Albanian
Egzona Ademi	"Zemrës"	Albanian
Meg	"Ik"	Albanian
Xheisara	"Si Me T'Lon"	Albanian
Adil Nuredini	"Zemër E Vrarë"	Albanian
3 November 2019
Kastro Zizo	"Pema E Jetës"	Albanian
Kachinari	"Dua"	Albanian
Orgesa Zaimi	"Verën Ku Ma Le"	Albanian
Diellza Nagavci	"Lutëm"	Albanian
Klara Doci	"Bashkë"	Albanian
Sany Dimitrios	"Apopse Fyge"	Greek
Laxxard	"Affection"	English
10 November 2019
Besa	"Histori"	Albanian
Lind Islami	"Ti M'Ke Rrit"	Albanian
Marsela Cibukaj	"Therrime Dashurie"	Albanian
Eneda Tarifa	"Ma Zgjat Dorën"	Albanian
Urban Band	"Rock N'Roll"	Albanian
Henri	"Fajtor"	Albanian
Vivjan	"Fatin Askush Se Di"	Albanian
17 November 2019
Veronica Liberati	"Miracle"	English
Fifi	"Marova"	Albanian
Aimee Sophia	"Night Train"	English
Elita Reci	"Patenta E Dashurisë"	Albanian
The Sins	"Realja"	Albanian
Dario	"Për Ty"	Albanian
Lina	"Neka Te Boli"	Macedonian
24 November 2019
Tamara Todevska	"Monsters"	English
West Side Family & Alban Kondi	"7 Ditë"	Albanian
Jehona Sopi	"Anej"	Albanian
Soni Malaj	"Shije Tradhëtie"	Albanian
Sharr Braina	"Nuk Pat Dashni"	Albanian
Rigersa Zefi	"Kot Me Fol Tani"	Albanian
Sara Bajraktari	"Më Vonë"	Albanian
Judah Gavra	"Me`Achshav"	Hebrew
1 December 2019
Juliana Pasha	"Nuk Do Qaj"	Albanian
Jason Walker	"Uh Huh"	English

== Semi-finals ==
=== Semi-final 1 ===
The first semi-final took place on 4 December 2019.

Draw	Artist(s)	Song
1	Olsi Bylyku	"Ma kthe"
2	Elita Reci	"Patenta e dashurisë"
3	Vitmar Basha	"Largoji rete"
4	Rovena Dilo featuring Hitman and Rolla	"Cinderella"
5	Marsela Cibukaj	"Therrime dashurie"
6	West Side Family and Alban Kondi	"7 ditë"
7	Fifi	"Marova"
8	Dario	"Për ty"
9	Laura & Elisa	"Nënë"
10	Klara Doci	"Bashkë"
11	Sharr Braina	"Nuk pat dashni"
12	Marjona Metohu	"Bosh"
13	Sany Dimitrios	"Apopse fyge"
14	Alex Alexander	"Breaking Down the Wall"
15	Laxxard	"Affection"
16	Lina	"Neka te boli"
17	Erik Lloshi	"Zhgenjimin kisha"
18	Jehona Sopi	"Anej"
19	Jason Walker	"Uh Huh"
20	Ardit Cuni	"Frymë"
21	Aimee Sophia	"Night Train"
22	Mar Shine	"Dejarte atrás"
23	Anxhela Peristeri	"Dikush i imi"
24	Endri and Stefi Prifti	"Zemra ime ështe gjallë"

=== Semi-final 2 ===
The second semi-final took place on 5 December 2019.

Draw	Artist(s)	Song
1	Dylan	"A mjaftoj une pa ty"
2	Egzona Ademi	"Zemrës"
3	Genti Deda	"Nuk ta fal"
4	Inis Neziri	"Ishe ti"
5	Kastro Zizo	"Pema e jetës"
6	Veronica Liberati	"Miracle"
7	Eneda Tarifa	"Ma zgjat dorën"
8	Urban Band	"Rock n'Roll"
9	Klea Kasemi	"Endacake zemre"
10	Rigersa Zefi	"Kot me fol tani"
11	Sara Bajraktari	"Më vonë"
12	Xheisara	"Si me t'lon"
13	Khuba	"Ndryshe"
14	Sisma	"Com'è Possibile"
15	Maria Kiou	"Mallon trelenomai"
16	Judah Gavra	"Me'achshav"
17	Kachinari	"Dua"
18	Rea Nuhu	"Për mua"
19	Orgesa Zaimi	"Verën ku ma le"
20	Juliana Pasha	"Nuk do qaj"
21	Soni Malaj	"Shije tradhëtie"
22	Tamara Todevska	"Monsters"
23	Lind Islami	"Ti m'ke rrit"

== Final ==
The grand final took place on 7 December 2019.

Key: Winner Second place Third place

Draw	Artist(s)	Song	Points	Place
1	Olsi Bylyku	"Ma kthe"	733	9
2	Orgesa Zaimi	"Verën ku ma le"	762	7
3	Rovena Dilo ft. Hitman & Rolla	"Cinderella"	472	18
4	Inis Neziri	"Ishe ti"	532	14
5	Kastro Zizo	"Pema e jetës"	499	16
6	Soni Malaj	"Shije tradhëtie"	540	13
7	Judah Gavra	"Me'achshav"	301	23
8	Lina	"Neka te boli"	236	25
9	Sisma	"Com'è possibile"	234	26
10	Maria Kiou	"Mallon trelenomai"	405	20
11	West Side Family & Alban Kondi	"7 ditë"	492	17
12	Jehona Sopi	"Anej"	417	19
13	Anxhela Peristeri	"Dikush i imi"	982	3
14	Juliana Pasha	"Nuk do qaj"	648	12
15	Erik Lloshi	"Zhgenjimin kisha"	747	8
16	Lind Islami	"Ti m'ke rrit"	711	10
17	Eneda Tarifa	"Ma zgjat dorën"	1370	1
18	Khuba	"Ndryshe"	781	6
19	Marjona Metohu	"Bosh"	512	15
20	Aimee Sophia	"Night Train"	243	24
21	Mar Shine	"Dejarte atrás"	232	27
22	Veronica Liberati	"Miracle"	318	22
23	Jason Walker	"Uh Huh"	403	21
24	Tamara Todevska	"Monsters"	830	5
25	Endri & Stefi Prifti	"Zemra ime ështe gjallë"	688	11
26	Fifi	"Marova"	1152	2
27	Marsela Cibukaj	"Therrime dashurie"	951	4

=== Special awards ===
Award	Recipient	Nominees	Ref.
Best New Artist	Khuba	Marjona Metohu	
Best New International Artist	Sisma	Judah Gavra; Lina; Maria Kiou	
Best Big International Artist	Tamara Todevska	Aimee Sophia; Jason Walker; Mar Shine; Veronica Liberati	
