= Marova (song) =

2019 single by Fifi

Single by Fifi
- Released: 17 November 2019
- Length: 3:17
- Songwriter: Fifi
- Producers: Fifi; Kledi Bahiti

Fifi singles chronology
"Shqipe" (2019)	"Marova" (2019)

Music video
- "Marova" on YouTube

"Marova" (Albanian pronunciation: [maɾova]; transl. Obsessed) is a song performed by Kosovo Albanian singer and songwriter Fifi. The record was released as a single through Onima under exclusive license from Threedots Productions. It was written by herself and composed for her participation at Kënga Magjike 2019.

Fifi performed the song for the first time at the 21st edition of Kënga Magjike on 17 November 2019. The song finished second in the grand final of Kënga Magjike 2019 with 1152 points constituting her highest position in the contest after three consecutive participations.

== See also ==
- Kënga Magjike 2019
