= Tamara Todevska =

Macedonian singer (born 1985)

Tamara Todevska Тамара Тодевска
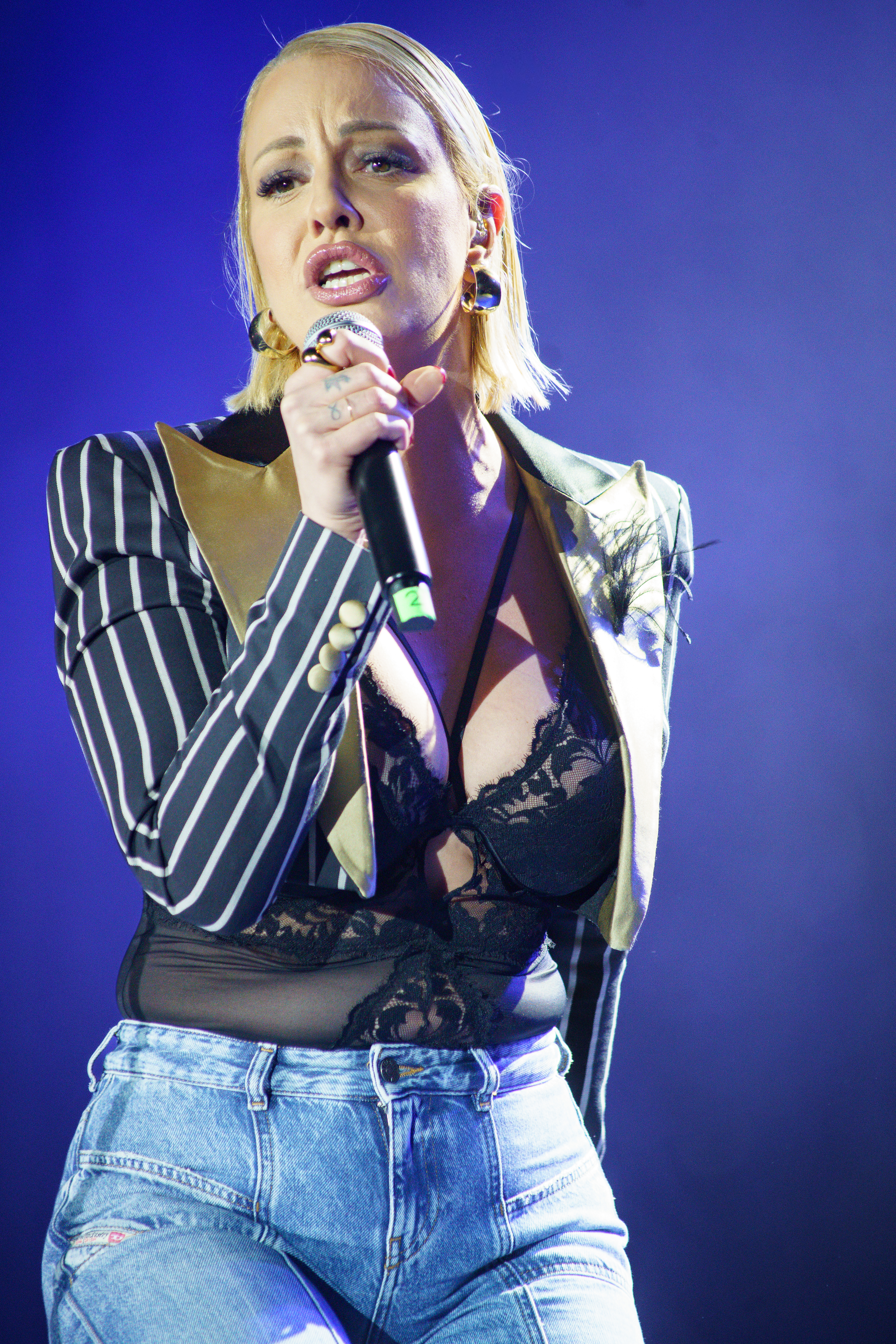
- Todevska performing in 2024

Background information
- Born: 1 June 1985 (age 41); Skopje, SR Macedonia, SFR Yugoslavia
- Genre: Pop
- Occupation: Singer
- Years active: 2003–present

Tamara Todevska (Macedonian: Тамара Тодевска, pronounced [ˈtamara ˈtɔdɛvska], born 1 June 1985), known professionally as Tamara, is a Macedonian singer. She has represented North Macedonia in the Eurovision Song Contest on two occasions; in 2008, she performed the song "Let Me Love You" with Vrčak and Adrian Gaxha and failed to qualify for the final, performing, and in 2019, she placed seventh in the final with the song "Proud" and winning the jury vote, earning North Macedonia its best-ever result in the contest.

Tamara began her music career in 2003 following the release of her debut studio album Sino. She has won on various music competitions throughout her career such as MAKFest in 2006 and Skopje Fest in 2007.

Todevska is the younger sister of singer Tijana Dapčević, and they have collaborated several times.

== Life ==
Tamara Todevska was born in Skopje. She was raised in a musical family. Her father, Velko Todevski, is a Macedonian professor in a music school and her mom, Brana, is a Bosnian Serb opera singer. Tamara's mom influenced her deep, operatic vocal style.

On 27 June 2015, Tamara married former basketball player Aleksandar Dimitrovski. They have one daughter named Hana and one son named Daren. The couple divorced after seven years of marriage.

== Career ==
Her first official song is a duet with her sister Tijana called "Igra luda" (Crazy game), released in 1997. Her music career broke through in 2003 when she sang "1003" at the Montenegrin festival Budva, where she placed 2nd.

In 2005, her first album was realized under the title Sino (English translation "Blue"). The music producer and composer of this album is Aleksandar Masevski with whom had Tamara cooperated since 2004. The album won Album of the year (2005). Hits from that album are: "Sino", "Molci, molci" (ft. Ronin), "A, shto ako?", "Ljubovna prikazna" (ft. Ugro), "Najverni prijateli", "Ljubi, ljubi" (duet with Tuna), "Shetaj" etc.

Tamara was successful during the Macedonian Eurovision selection. She gained 105 points, placing second with the song "Kazi Koj Si Ti" ("Tell Me Who You Are").

In February 2008, Tamara won the Skopje Fest 2008 with the song "Vo ime na ljubovta" featuring Vrčak and Adrian, thus gaining the right to represent Macedonia in the Eurovision Song Contest 2008. The song became a hit in the Balkans, and was predicted to do well in the Eurovision. They recorded the song in six languages: Macedonian, English, Serbian, Turkish, Russian and Albanian, and the music video was made by Dejan Milićević.

In the Eurovision Song Contest 2008, which was held in Belgrade, Serbia, they performed in the second semi-final, on 24 May 2008. They sang the English version of the song, called "Let Me Love You" and reached 10th place in the semifinal. However, whilist it would have been enough to qualify in previous and upcoming years, in 2008 and 2009 only the top nine places qualified automatically and the tenth place was decided based on the votes of the backup juries, and this time, juries chose Sweden to qualify over Macedonia, meaning that Macedonia ultimately failed to qualify.

Todevska went solo to represent North Macedonia in the Eurovision Song Contest 2019 in Tel Aviv with the song “Proud”. In the final, she finished in seventh place with 305 points and placed first in the jury vote. This is North Macedonia’s best result at the contest.

In December 2019, Tamara participated in the 21st edition of Kënga Magjike with the song "Monsters" and finished fifth overall.

== Discography ==
=== Albums ===
- Sino (2005)
- Eden Den (2015)
- Kukla Živa (2026)

=== Singles ===
- 1997 "Igra luda" (feat. Tijana Dapčević - Skopje Fest)
- 2002 "Dali znam"
- 2002 "Koga bi mozela" (feat. Branka Todevska - Ohrid Fest)
- 2003 "1003" (Suncane Skale)
- 2004 "Sex"
- 2004 "Sino"
- 2004 "Molci molci" (feat. Ronin) - cover of Nina Spirova's song - Kirilico Ispeana (2009)
- 2005 "Najverni Prijateli"
- 2005 "Ljubi, ljubi" (feat. Tuna)
- 2005 "Šetaj"
- 2005 "A, što ako?"
- 2005 "Ljubovna prikazna" (feat. Ugro)
- 2006 "Losa Devojka"
- 2006 "Sedmo Nebo" (feat. Vrčak - winner of MakFest)
- 2007 "Kaži Koj Si Ti" (runner up of Nacionalen Evrosong)
- 2007 "Luda" (feat. DNK, Vrčak)
- 2007 "Za Makedonija" (feat. Toni Zen - Makedonija Naviva)
- 2007 "Smešhno zar ne" (MakFest)
- 2008 "Vo ime na ljubovta/Let me love you/Tebe volim/Yoksun/Vo imja ljobovi/Dashuri Mistike" (feat. Vrčak & Adrian Gaxha, Skopje Fest winner, Macedonian entry for Eurovision Song Contest)
- 2008 "So maki sum se rodila" (old Macedonian folklore song sung by Tamara in techno version - Makedonija Zasekogaš)
- 2008 "Dajem Ti Sve" (Budva Fest)
- 2009 "Usne ko krv" (Serbian Radio-Festival)
- 2009 "Una magia Pandev" (feat. Toni Zen)
- 2009 "Šarena Pesma" (Budva Fest)
- 2009 "Davam Jas Se" (Dajem Ti Sve - Macedonian cover)
- 2019 "Proud" (North Macedonia's entry for Eurovision Song Contest)
- 2019 "Monsters"
- 2020 "Sloboda"
- 2020 "Rise" (English-language version of "Sloboda")
- 2021 "Porok"
- 2022 "Savrsen Kroj"
- 2023 "Nijagara"
- 2023 "Tornado"
- 2024 "Ego" (with Young Dadi)
- 2024 "Svetot e" (feat. Robert Bilbilov)
- 2024 "Hollywood"
- 2025 "Vreme Za Placenje"
- 2025 "Lavirint" (feat. Igor Dzambazov)
- 2026 "Drama Queen"
- 2026 "Kukla Ziva"
- 2026 "Diva"

=== Compilations ===
- 2007 Makedonija Naviva
- 2008 Makedonija Zasekogaš
- 2009 Kirilico Ispeana

== See also ==
- Music of North Macedonia
- North Macedonia in the Eurovision Song Contest 2008
- North Macedonia in the Eurovision Song Contest 2019

Awards and achievements
Preceded by Karolina Gočeva with "Mojot svet"	Macedonia in the Eurovision Song Contest (with Vrčak and Adrian); 2008	Succeeded by Next Time with "Nešto što kje ostane"
Preceded by Eye Cue with "Lost and Found"	North Macedonia in the Eurovision Song Contest; 2019	Succeeded by Vasil Garvanliev with "You"
