= You (Vasil Garvanliev song) =

2020 song by Vasil Garvanliev

Single by Vasil Garvanliev
- Released: 8 March 2020
- Genre: Pop
- Length: 3:00
- Label: Independent
- Songwriters: Nevena Neskoska; Kalina Neskoska; Alice Schroeder
- Producers: Nevena Neskoska; Javier Lloret de Muller; Darko Dimitrov; Lazar Cvetkoski

Vasil Garvanliev singles chronology
"Patuvam" (2019)	"You" (2020)	"Mojata Ulica" (2020)

Eurovision Song Contest 2020 entry
- Country: North Macedonia
- Artist: Vasil Garvanliev
- Language: English
- Composer: Nevena Neskoska
- Lyricists: Nevena Neskoska; Kalina Neskoska; Alice Schroeder

Finals performance
- Semi-final result: Contest cancelled

Entry chronology
- ◄ "Proud" (2019)
- "Here I Stand" (2021) ►

"You" is a song recorded by Macedonian singer Vasil Garvanliev. The song was written and produced by Nevena Neskoska alongside Alice Schroeder and Kalina Neskoska. Javier Lloret de Muller, Darko Dimitrov and Lazar Cvetkoski provided additional production.

The song was scheduled to represent North Macedonia in the Eurovision Song Contest 2020 after being internally selected by Macedonian Radio Television (MRT). However, the contest was later cancelled due to the COVID-19 pandemic.

== Background ==
=== Composition ===
Lasting three minutes, the English-language song, "You", was composed by Macedonian composer Nevena Neskoska and written by the latter together with Alice Schroeder and Kalina Neskoska. Along with Nevena Neskoska and Javier Lloret de Muller, Macedonian producers Darko Dimitrov and Lazar Cvetkoski were also helmed for the record's production process.

=== Promotion ===
An accompanying music video for "You" was officially premiered onto the YouTube channel of the Eurovision Song Contest on 8 March 2020. The vibrant video was directed by Milena Vitman and produced by Jellmaz Dervishi while it was solely edited and recorded by Gjorgi Vacev. Visually, its message is an "invitation for everyone to connect, open up, dance, and celebrate the moment".

== At Eurovision ==
The Eurovision Song Contest 2020 was scheduled to take place in Rotterdam, the Netherlands, consisting of two semi-finals on 12 May and 14 May 2020, and the grand final on 16 May 2020. Each participating country, except the host country and the Big Five, is required to qualify from one of two semi-finals to compete for the grand final. On 28 January 2020, a special allocation draw was held which placed each country into one of the two semi-finals, as well as which half of the show they would perform in. North Macedonia was placed into the first semi-final, to be held on 12 May 2020, and was scheduled to perform in the first half of the show. In March 2020, the European Broadcasting Union cancelled the contest due to the COVID-19 pandemic.
