= Proud (Tamara Todevska song) =

2019 song by Tamara Todevska

Single by Tamara Todevska
- Released: 8 March 2019
- Length: 3:00
- Label: Dimitrov
- Composers: Darko Dimitrov; Robert Bilbilov; Lazar Cvetkoski
- Lyricists: Kosta Petrov; Sanja Popovska

Tamara Todevska singles chronology
"Doviduvanje tago" (2018)	"Proud" (2019)	"Monsters" (2019)

Eurovision Song Contest 2019 entry
- Country: North Macedonia
- Artist: Tamara Todevska
- Language: English
- Composer: Darko Dimitrov, Robert Bilbilov, Lazar Cvetkoski
- Lyricist: Kosta Petrov, Sanja Popovska

Finals performance
- Semi-final result: 2nd
- Semi-final points: 239
- Final result: 7th
- Final points: 305

Entry chronology
- ◄ "Lost and Found" (2018)
- "You" (2020) ►

"Proud" is a song recorded by North Macedonian singer Tamara Todevska. It was composed by Darko Dimitrov, Robert Bilbilov and Lazar Cvetkoski, with the lyrics being written by Kosta Petrov and Sanja Popovska. It was the Macedonian entry at the Eurovision Song Contest 2019, which took place in Tel Aviv. Although the song was initially planned to be released on 4 March 2019, the release date was postponed the day before to 8 March 2019 to coincide with International Women's Day. Todevska performed "Proud" during the second Eurovision semi-final on 16 May 2019, and qualified for the final, where it placed seventh with 305 points, despite winning the jury vote.

== Background ==
In January 2019, Macedonian Radio Television revealed that singer Tamara Todevska would represent North Macedonia in the Eurovision Song Contest 2019 in Tel Aviv, Israel. Todevska previously represented the country alongside Vrčak and Adrian at the 2008 contest in Belgrade, Serbia with "Let Me Love You", but failed to qualify for the final. Tamara was also a backing vocalist for the Toše Proeski's performance of "Life" in 2004 and Tijana Dapčević’s rendition of "To The Sky" in 2014.

"Proud" alongside its music video premiered on 8 March 2019 during MKRTV evening news; it featured among others, transgender activist Lila Milikj. Although it was initially planned to be released on 4 March 2019, the release date was postponed the day before to 8 March 2019 to coincide with International Women's Day, in a statement released on the Macedonian delegation's Twitter account. The song was composed by Darko Dimitrov, Robert Bilbilov and Lazar Cvetkoski, with the lyrics being written by Kosta Petrov and Sanja Popovska. Todevska dedicated "Proud" to her daughter, Hana, and "everyone out there fighting for their dreams and believing in their greatness."

== Composition ==
Although initially presented as a feminist anthem, Todevska explained that "Proud" is a song for "everyone that has been told to put their head down, to follow society’s rules" that according to her, "make no sense in the 21st century". Kosta Petrov, who co-wrote the song's lyrics with his wife, Sanja Popovska, revealed that "Proud" was written for their daughter, as well as Todevska's daughter, but generally, it's a song about equality, "It is about accepting yourself, loving yourself and celebrating your true self. It is about being proud of yourself. It celebrates womanhood and feminism but applies to immigrants, LGBT, it applies to everyone fighting for equality. Anyone who has been put down for who they are, this is a song for them."

== Eurovision Song Contest ==
=== Background ===
On 28 January 2019, a special allocation draw was held which placed each country into one of the two semi-finals, as well as which half of the show they would perform in. North Macedonia was placed into the second semi-final and was scheduled to perform in the second half of the show. Ultimately, Todevska was scheduled to perform at number 17, pre-last in the respective semi-final. Prior her performance at the Eurovision Song Contest, in his article "Eurovision 2019: 12 Songs to Watch", Fred Bronson of Billboard magazine placed the song at number 11 and wrote that the reason why "Proud" might win is the "celebration of women in the time of #MeToo should connect with a lot of voting viewers as well as the professional juries."

=== Stage direction and visual design ===
The stage direction was conceived by Mari Forsman Ryberger and Tine Matulessy. The concept was simple and minimalistic, with Todevska singing along with a microphone stand on the stage. The dress worn by Todevska was created by Aleksandar Noshpal, who is also credited for making the dress for Karolina in 2002 and the suit for Toše Proeski in 2004. It is a full-length, false strapless, emerald green dress, made with a metallic shimmer material, with black tulle covering the upper top part of Todevska's body. The dress was also featured as a visual enhancer, mirroring the structure of the backside on the screens.

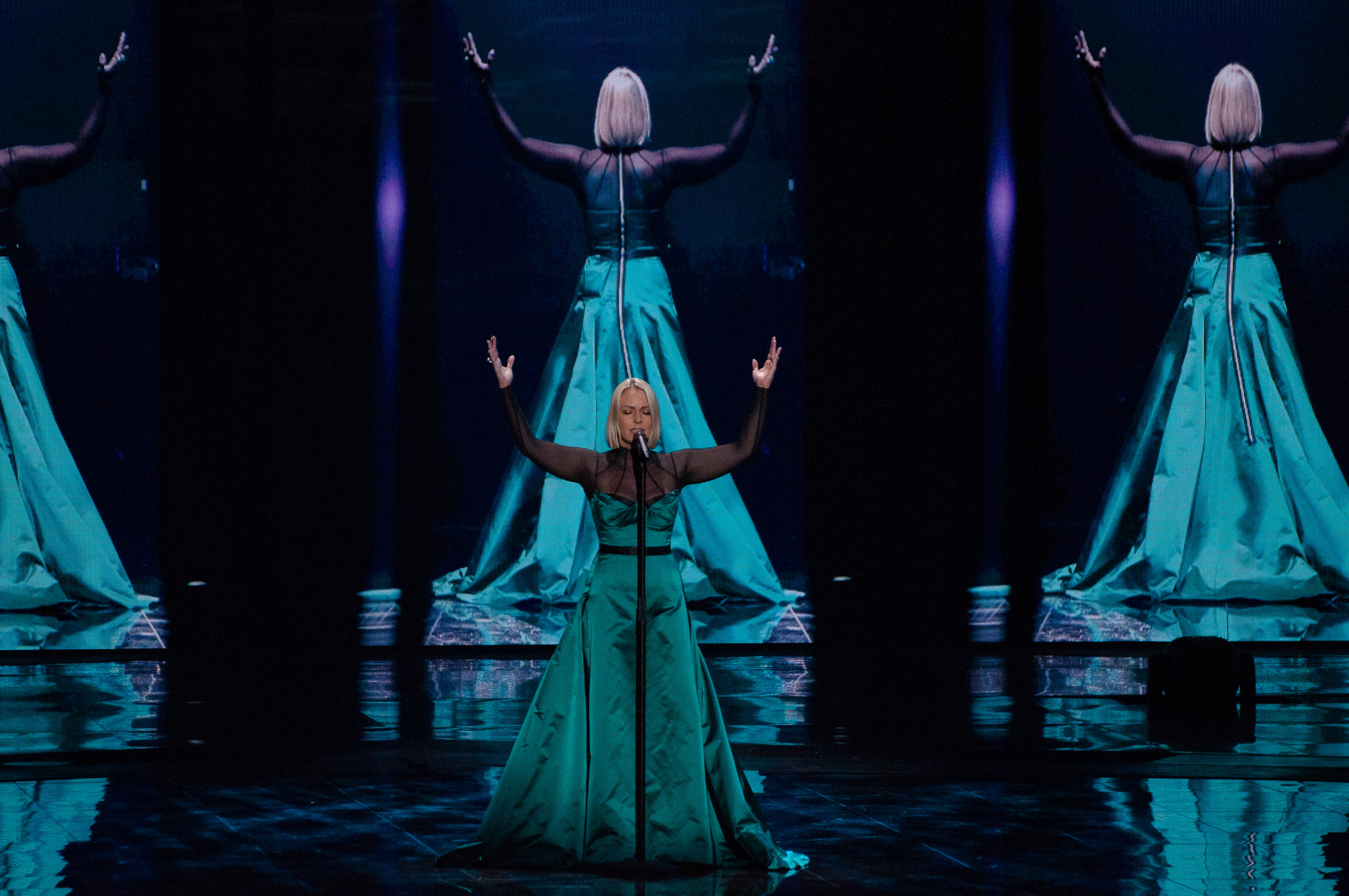
Todevska performing "Proud" during the dress rehearsal for the second semi-final. The dress reflections can be seen on the LED screens behind her.

The performance starts with Todevska subtly lighted, as the dress' reflections start to show. As the light hits Todevska's face, she started to choreograph hand gestures, which indicates confidence and power. When the first chorus hits, purple starts to come out from the bottom spotlights. In the bridge, the stage darkens again, with images of women and girls being shown on monochrome in the back screens. The second verse was highlighted with purple rays coming out from the gaps of the screens. In the second chorus, rays of white lighting flourished on the stage, with the progression of giving an uplifting atmosphere towards the ending. In the second semi-final, the lighting bloom was enhanced with subtle blue lighting from the screen gaps, but it was omitted in the grand final. The ending note was executed with Todevska shone under a wide spotlight, with the picture of her holding her daughter, Hana, shown on the screen.

=== Result ===
North Macedonia was the first country to be announced for the Grand Final. It finished 2nd in the second semi-final with 239 points from both the juries and the televoting. In the final, "Proud" was performed in the first half of the show, at number eight. After the voting, it originally ended up finishing at number eight with 295 points and was second according to the jury vote and number twelve from the televoting. However, on 22 May 2019, a statement was issued by the EBU, stating that an incorrect Belarusian Jury result was given during the broadcast of the Grand Final four days earlier. The error mentioned by the EBU statement, consisted of presenting the bottom ten of the Belarusian aggregated result, rather than the top ten. The incorrect point totals had some consequences for the ranking. North Macedonia was the winner of jury vote, and the country ended up finishing at number seven with a total of 305 points (one place up). This was North Macedonia's first Top 10 finish since joining the competition in 1998 and best result overall.

== Track listing ==
Digital download and stream
No.	Title	Length
1.	"Proud"	3:00

Digital download and stream
No.	Title	Length
1.	"Proud (Cyrillic Remix)"	3:56

== Charts ==
Chart (2019)	Peak position
North Macedonia (Radiomonitor)	3

== See also ==
- Macedonia in the Eurovision Song Contest 2008
- "Let Me Love You"
