= Netherlands in the Eurovision Song Contest 2022 =

- Eurovision Song Contest 2022
- Participating broadcaster: AVROTROS
- Country: Netherlands
- Selection process: Internal selection
- Announcement date: Artist: 7 December 2021; Song: 3 March 2022

Competing entry
- Song: "De diepte"
- Artist: S10
- Songwriters: Stien den Hollander; Arno Krabman

Placement
- Semi-final result: Qualified (2nd, 221 points)
- Final result: 11th, 171 points

Participation chronology

The Netherlands was represented at the Eurovision Song Contest 2022 with the song "De diepte", written by Stien den Hollander and Arno Krabman, and performed by S10. The Dutch participating broadcaster, AVROTROS, internally selected its entry for the contest. S10's appointment as the Dutch representative was announced on 7 December 2021, while the song, "De diepte", was presented to the public during an event on 3 March 2022.

The Netherlands was drawn to compete in the first semi-final of the Eurovision Song Contest which took place on 10 May 2022. Performing during the show in position 8, "De diepte" was announced among the top 10 entries of the first semi-final and therefore qualified to compete in the final on 14 May. It was later revealed that the Netherlands placed second out of the 17 participating countries in the semi-final with 221 points. In the final, the Netherlands placed eleventh out of the 25 participating countries, scoring 171 points.

== Background ==
Prior to the 2022 contest, AVROTROS and its predecessor national broadcasters have participated in the Eurovision Song Contest representing the Netherlands sixty-one times since NTS début in 1956. They have won the contest five times: in 1957 with the song "Net als toen" performed by Corry Brokken; in 1959 with the song "'n Beetje" performed by Teddy Scholten; in 1969 as one of four countries to tie for first place with "De troubadour" performed by Lenny Kuhr; in 1975 with "Ding-a-dong" performed by the group Teach-In; and in 2019 with "Arcade" performed by Duncan Laurence. Following the introduction of semi-finals for the 2004 contest, the Netherlands had featured in eight finals. The Dutch least successful result has been last place, which they have achieved on five occasions, most recently in the second semi-final of the 2011 contest. The Netherlands has also received nul points on two occasions; in 1962 and 1963.

As part of its duties as participating broadcaster, AVROTROS organises the selection of its entry in the Eurovision Song Contest and broadcasts the event in the country. The Dutch broadcaster has used various methods to select its entry in the past, such as the Nationaal Songfestival, a live televised national final to choose the performer, song or both to compete at Eurovision. However, internal selections have also been held on occasion. Since 2013, the Dutch broadcaster has internally selected its entry for the contest. In 2013, the internal selection of "Birds" by Anouk managed to take the country to the final for the first time in eight years and placed ninth overall. In 2014, the internal selection of "Calm After the Storm" by the Common Linnets qualified the country to the final once again and placed second, while the internal selection of Duncan Laurence in 2019 managed to achieve a Dutch victory for the first time since 1975. For 2022, AVROTROS opted to continue selecting its entry through an internal selection.

== Before Eurovision ==
=== Internal selection ===
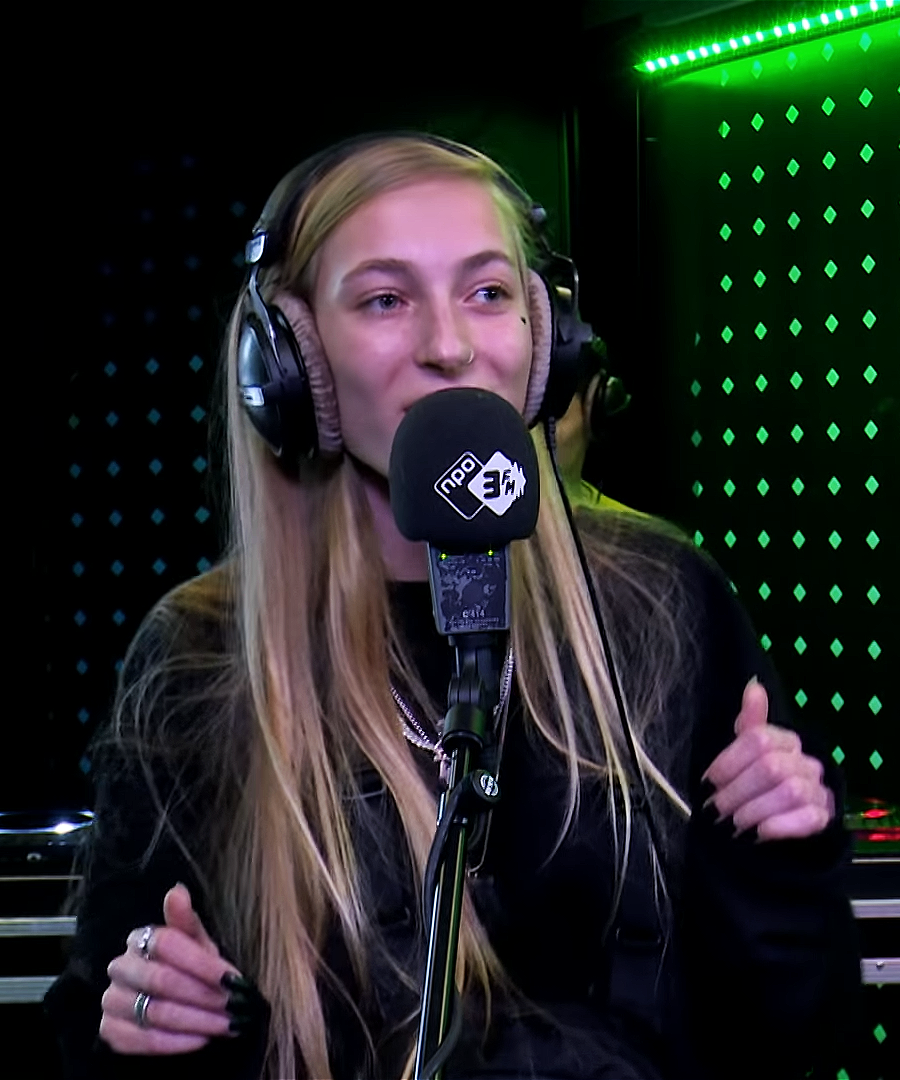
S10 was internally selected to represent the Netherlands in the Eurovision Song Contest 2022

Following Jeangu Macrooy's twenty-third place in the final in 2021 with "Birth of a New Age", AVROTROS revealed that it would continue to internally select both the artist and song for the Eurovision Song Contest. A submission period was opened by the broadcaster on 24 May 2021 where artists and composers were able to submit their entries until 31 August 2021. Each artist and songwriter was able to submit a maximum of three songs and entries with "a contemporary, but in any case authentic sound" were preferred. The broadcaster also sought out "a personal song in a distinctive way, in any genre, and if possible a personal story". Artists that were later rumoured in Dutch media to have been selected included singer Lakshmi.

On 7 December 2021, AVROTROS announced that they had selected singer and rapper S10 to represent the Netherlands at the 2022 contest. The selection of S10 as the Dutch representative occurred through the decision of a selection commission consisting of AVROTROS general director Eric van Stade, television host and author Cornald Maas, singer and television host Jan Smit, radio DJs Coen Swijnenberg and Sander Lantinga, and Dutch Eurovision delegation member Joyce Hoedelmans from four entries shortlisted among 400 submissions received by the broadcaster, one of which was performed by Dani van Velthoven, winner of the eleventh season of the reality singing competition The Voice of Holland. In regards to her selection as the Dutch entrant, S10 stated: "Music is everything to me. I hope my music can bring something to other people's lives, simply because it has done so much for me. Which is why I could almost explode with joy at the idea that I'll be taking part in the Eurovision Song Contest this year. In front of such a massive audience, being able to do something that’s such an honour while representing the Netherlands… I think it's absolutely wonderful."

On 3 March 2022, S10's Eurovision entry, "De diepte", was presented to the public during an event that took place at the Tuschinski Theatre in Amsterdam. The song was premiered at the same time during the NPO Radio 2 programme Aan de slag!, hosted by Bart Arens. The official video for the song, directed by Cas Mulder, was released on the same day. "De diepte" was written by S10 herself together with Arno Krabman. In regards to the song, S10 stated: "It's a tribute to the sadness and memories that you carry with you. Everyone experiences difficult times in their lives. That's something we all have in common and I hope you will feel less alone when you listen to the song."

=== Promotion ===
In the lead up to the Eurovision Song Contest, S10's promotional activities occurred entirely within the Netherlands where she performed at live events, radio shows and talk shows. On 9 April, S10 performed during the Eurovision in Concert event which was held at the AFAS Live venue in Amsterdam and hosted by Cornald Maas and Edsilia Rombley.

== At Eurovision ==
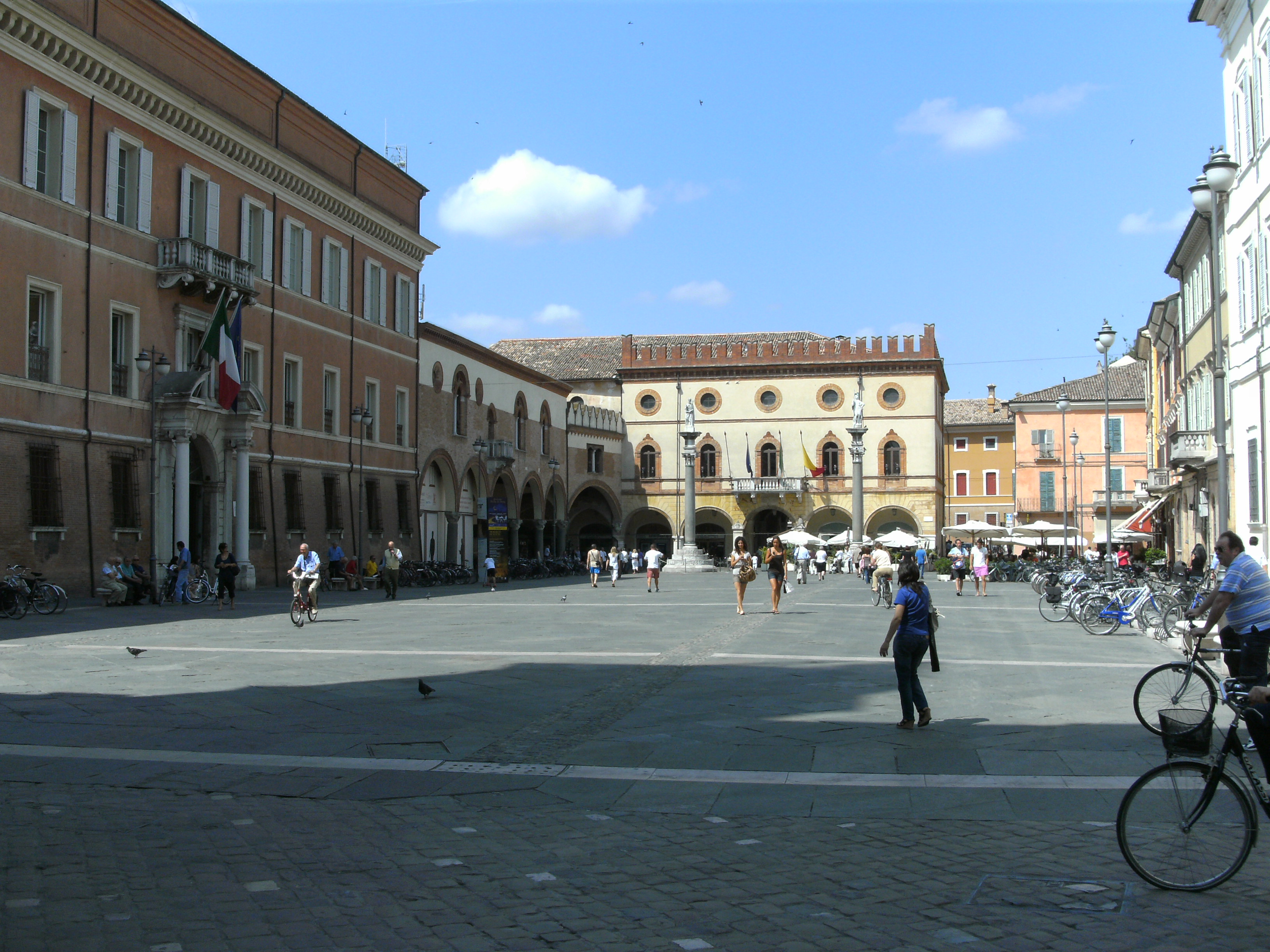
A video postcard introduced S10's performance in the first semi-final of the Eurovision Song Contest 2022. The postcard was filmed in Ravenna in Emilia-Romagna and featured virtual projections of the S10 across the location.

According to Eurovision rules, all countries with the exceptions of the host country and the "Big Five" (France, Germany, Italy, Spain and the United Kingdom) are required to qualify from one of two semi-finals in order to compete for the final; the top ten countries from each semi-final progress to the final. The European Broadcasting Union (EBU) split up the competing countries into six different pots based on voting patterns from previous contests, with countries with favourable voting histories put into the same pot. On 25 January 2022, an allocation draw was held which placed each country into one of the two semi-finals, as well as which half of the show they would perform in. The Netherlands was placed into the first semi-final, which was held on 10 May 2022, and has been scheduled to perform in the first half of the show.

Once all the competing songs for the 2022 contest had been released, the running order for the semi-finals was decided by the shows' producers rather than through another draw, so that similar songs were not placed next to each other. The Netherlands was set to perform in position 8, following the entry from Bulgaria and before the entry from Moldova.

The two semi-finals and the final were broadcast on NPO 1 and BVN with commentary by Jan Smit and Cornald Maas as well as via radio on NPO Radio 2 with commentary by Frank van 't Hof and Jeroen Kijk in de Vegte. The Dutch spokesperson, who announced the top 12-point score awarded by the Dutch jury during the final, was 2021 Dutch Eurovision entrant Jeangu Macrooy.

=== Semi-final ===
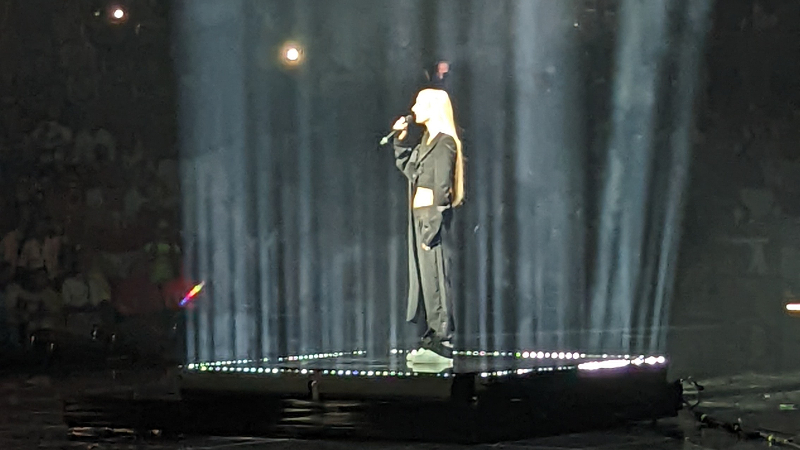
S10 performing during the first semi-final

S10 took part in technical rehearsals on 30 April and 4 May, followed by dress rehearsals on 9 and 10 May. This included the jury show on 9 May where the professional juries of each country watched and voted on the competing entries.

The Dutch performance featured S10 wearing a black two-piece outfit designed by Viktor & Rolf and performing alone on stage on a platform with lights behind and a spotlight on the singer. The stage was predominately dark with a silhouette being seen during the performance, while the LED beneath the stage arches created a sunset effect with strobe effects also being used at the chorus. The staging director for the performance was Marnix Kaart, while the creative supervisor was Wouter van Ransbeek and the lighting designer was Henk Jan van Beek.

At the end of the show, the Netherlands was announced as having finished in the top 10 and subsequently qualifying for the grand final. It was later revealed that the Netherlands placed second in the semi-final, receiving a total of 221 points: 79 points from the televoting and 142 points from the juries.

=== Final ===
Shortly after the first semi-final, a winners' press conference was held for the ten qualifying countries. As part of this press conference, the qualifying artists took part in a draw to determine which half of the grand final they would subsequently participate in. This draw was done in the order the countries appeared in the semi-final running order. The Netherlands was drawn to compete in the first half. Following this draw, the shows' producers decided upon the running order of the final, as they had done for the semi-finals. The Netherlands was subsequently placed to perform in position 11, following the entry from Spain and before the entry from Ukraine.

S10 once again took part in dress rehearsals on 13 and 14 May before the final, including the jury final where the professional juries cast their final votes before the live show. S10 performed a repeat of their semi-final performance during the final on 14 May. The Netherlands placed eleventh in the final, scoring 171 points: 42 points from the televoting and 129 points from the juries.

=== Voting ===
Below is a breakdown of points awarded to the Netherlands in the first semi-final and in the final. Voting during the three shows involved each country awarding two sets of points from 1-8, 10 and 12: one from their professional jury and the other from televoting. The exact composition of the professional jury, and the results of each country's jury and televoting were released after the final; the individual results from each jury member were also released in an anonymised form. The Dutch jury consisted of Andrew Makkinga, Barry Paf, Eva van Manen, Kris Berry, and Perquisite. In the first semi-final, the Netherlands placed 2nd with 221 points. In the final, the Netherlands placed 11th with 171 points. Over the course of the contest, the Netherlands awarded its 12 points to Greece (jury) and Ukraine (televote) in the first semi-final and the final of the contest.

==== Points awarded to the Netherlands ====
Points awarded to the Netherlands (Semi-final 1)
Score	Televote	Jury
12 points		Armenia; Denmark; Switzerland; Ukraine
10 points		Albania; Italy; Slovenia
8 points	Iceland; Moldova; Portugal	Austria; France; Lithuania; Norway; Portugal
7 points		Iceland
6 points	Lithuania; Ukraine	Greece
5 points	Austria	
4 points	Armenia; Denmark; France; Greece; Italy	Bulgaria
3 points	Albania; Bulgaria; Croatia; Latvia; Slovenia	Latvia
2 points	Switzerland	Croatia; Moldova
1 point	Norway	

Points awarded to the Netherlands (Final)
Score	Televote	Jury
12 points		Italy
10 points	Belgium	Denmark; Switzerland
8 points		Austria; Ukraine
7 points		Portugal; Slovenia
6 points	Albania	Albania; Lithuania
5 points	Iceland	Finland; Norway
4 points	Germany; Portugal	Armenia; Azerbaijan; France; Georgia; Germany; Greece; Iceland; Latvia
3 points	Estonia; Ukraine	Montenegro; Poland; Romania
2 points	Israel; Italy	Croatia
1 point	Lithuania; Slovenia; Sweden	Estonia; Israel

==== Points awarded by the Netherlands ====
Points awarded by the Netherlands (Semi-final 1)
Score	Televote	Jury
12 points	Ukraine	Greece
10 points	Moldova	Portugal
8 points	Armenia	Ukraine
7 points	Norway	Switzerland
6 points	Portugal	Norway
5 points	Lithuania	Iceland
4 points	Iceland	Armenia
3 points	Greece	Croatia
2 points	Switzerland	Lithuania
1 point	Latvia	Slovenia

Points awarded by the Netherlands (Final)
Score	Televote	Jury
12 points	Ukraine	Greece
10 points	Moldova	Switzerland
8 points	United Kingdom	Portugal
7 points	Spain	Australia
6 points	Poland	Belgium
5 points	Norway	Spain
4 points	Belgium	United Kingdom
3 points	Serbia	Norway
2 points	Sweden	Moldova
1 point	Estonia	Sweden

==== Detailed voting results ====
The following members comprised the Dutch jury:

- Andrew Makkinga – Radio DJ
- Barry Paf – Radio DJ
- Eva van Manen – Singer-songwriter, producer
- Kris Berry – Singer
- Pieter Perquin – Musician, composer, producer, composed the Dutch entries for the Eurovision Song Contest 2020 and 2021

Detailed voting results from the Netherlands (Semi-final 1)
R/O	Country	Jury							Televote	
R/O	Country	Juror 1	Juror 2	Juror 3	Juror 4	Juror 5	Rank	Points	Rank	Points
01	Albania	13	14	10	8	16	14		14	
02	Latvia	14	16	9	15	14	16		10	1
03	Lithuania	16	6	11	5	9	9	2	6	5
04	Switzerland	9	5	7	2	2	4	7	9	2
05	Slovenia	12	12	3	14	15	10	1	13	
06	Ukraine	4	4	2	7	5	3	8	1	12
07	Bulgaria	10	15	15	10	12	15		15	
08	Netherlands									
09	Moldova	7	9	12	13	7	11		2	10
10	Portugal	3	1	13	4	3	2	10	5	6
11	Croatia	5	8	5	6	10	8	3	12	
12	Denmark	8	10	8	12	11	12		11	
13	Austria	15	13	6	16	13	13		16	
14	Iceland	2	7	16	3	6	6	5	7	4
15	Greece	6	2	14	1	1	1	12	8	3
16	Norway	1	11	1	11	8	5	6	4	7
17	Armenia	11	3	4	9	4	7	4	3	8

Detailed voting results from the Netherlands (Final)
R/O	Country	Jury							Televote	
R/O	Country	Juror 1	Juror 2	Juror 3	Juror 4	Juror 5	Rank	Points	Rank	Points
01	Czech Republic	21	22	19	24	21	21		24	
02	Romania	22	23	21	20	23	23		17	
03	Portugal	2	15	1	4	11	3	8	11	
04	Finland	23	19	22	23	22	22		20	
05	Switzerland	3	10	3	5	3	2	10	16	
06	France	24	24	24	22	24	24		22	
07	Norway	12	2	12	14	13	8	3	6	5
08	Armenia	8	11	18	15	16	17		12	
09	Italy	18	13	16	19	14	18		15	
10	Spain	6	8	4	7	2	6	5	4	7
11	Netherlands									
12	Ukraine	14	6	8	8	15	12		1	12
13	Germany	20	20	7	13	10	16		18	
14	Lithuania	4	17	11	9	18	13		13	
15	Azerbaijan	17	5	20	10	17	14		19	
16	Belgium	10	14	5	3	1	5	6	7	4
17	Greece	1	3	2	2	8	1	12	21	
18	Iceland	13	16	9	11	4	11		23	
19	Moldova	5	7	10	17	9	9	2	2	10
20	Sweden	11	12	15	6	6	10	1	9	2
21	Australia	16	4	6	1	5	4	7	14	
22	United Kingdom	9	1	13	16	7	7	4	3	8
23	Poland	7	9	23	18	12	15		5	6
24	Serbia	15	21	17	21	20	20		8	3
25	Estonia	19	18	14	12	19	19		10	1
