= Netherlands in the Eurovision Song Contest 2021 =

- Eurovision Song Contest 2021
- Participating broadcaster: AVROTROS
- Country: Netherlands
- Selection process: Internal selection
- Announcement date: Artist: 18 March 2020; Song: 4 March 2021

Competing entry
- Song: "Birth of a New Age"
- Artist: Jeangu Macrooy
- Songwriters: Jeangu Macrooy; Pieter Perquin

Placement
- Final result: 23rd, 11 points

Participation chronology

The Netherlands was represented at the Eurovision Song Contest 2021 with the song "Birth of a New Age", written by Jeangu Macrooy and Pieter Perquin, and performed by Macrooy himself. The Dutch participating broadcaster, AVROTROS, internally selected Macrooy after he was due to compete in the 2020 contest with "Grow" before the event's cancellation. In addition, AVROTROS, along with Nederlandse Omroep Stichting (NOS) and their parent organisation Nederlandse Publieke Omroep (NPO), was also the host broadcaster and staged the event at the Rotterdam Ahoy in Rotterdam, after winning the 2019 contest with the song "Arcade" performed by Duncan Laurence. Macrooy's re-appointment as the Dutch representative was announced on 18 March 2020, while the song was presented to the public during a special live broadcast on 4 March 2021.

As the host country, the Netherlands qualified to compete directly in the final of the Eurovision Song Contest. The country placed twenty-third out of the 26 participating countries with 11 points.

== Background ==
Prior to the 2021 contest, AVROTROS and its predecessor national broadcasters, had participated in the Eurovision Song Contest representing the Netherlands sixty times since NTS's debut in the inaugural contest in 1956. Since then, they have won the contest five times: in 1957 with the song "Net als toen" performed by Corry Brokken; in 1959 with the song "'n Beetje" performed by Teddy Scholten; in 1969 as one of four countries to tie for first place with "De troubadour" performed by Lenny Kuhr; in 1975 with "Ding-a-dong" performed by the group Teach-In; and finally in 2019 with "Arcade" performed by Duncan Laurence. Following the introduction of semi-finals for the 2004 contest, they had featured in seven finals.

As part of its duties as participating broadcaster, AVROTROS organises the selection of its entry in the Eurovision Song Contest and broadcasts the event in the country. The Dutch broadcaster has used various methods to select its entry in the past, such as the Nationaal Songfestival, a live televised national final to choose the performer, song or both to compete at Eurovision. However, internal selections have also been held on occasion. Since 2013, the broadcaster has internally selected the Dutch entry for the contest. In 2013, the internal selection of "Birds" performed by Anouk managed to take them to the final for the first time in eight years and placed ninth overall. In 2014, the internal selection of "Calm After the Storm" performed by the Common Linnets qualified to the final once again and placed second, while the internal selection of Duncan Laurence in 2019 managed to achieve a Dutch victory for the first time since 1975. For 2021, the broadcaster opted to continue selecting the Dutch entry through an internal selection.

== Before Eurovision ==
=== Internal selection ===
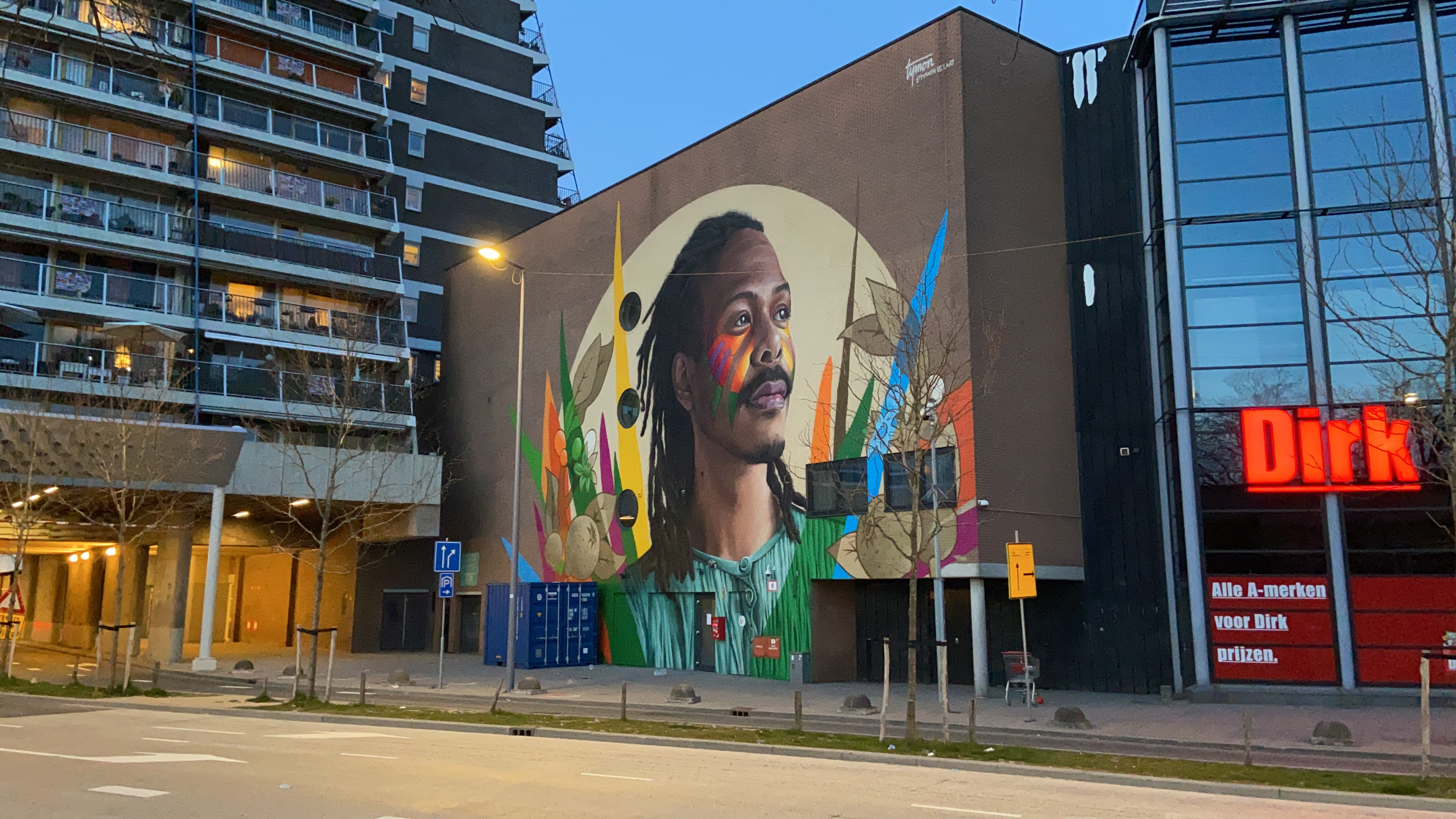
Wall painting dedicated to Jeangu Macrooy, created by Rotterdam artist Tymon de Laat to celebrate Macrooy's participation in the 2021 contest.

On 18 March 2020, AVROTROS confirmed that Jeangu Macrooy would remain as their representative for the Eurovision Song Contest 2021. On 4 March 2021, Macrooy's Eurovision entry, "Birth of a New Age", was presented to the public during a special live broadcast streamed online via the broadcaster's YouTube channel. The selection of the song, written by Jeangu Macrooy himself together with Pieter Perquin, occurred through the decision of Macrooy and a selection commission consisting of AVROTROS general director Eric van Stade, television host and author Cornald Maas, singer and television host Jan Smit, radio DJs Coen Swijnenberg and Sander Lantinga, and Dutch Eurovision delegation member Joyce Hoedelmans. "Birth of a New Age" became the first entry in the Eurovision Song Contest to feature lyrics in the Sranan Tongo language.

== At Eurovision ==
According to Eurovision rules, all nations with the exceptions of the host country and the "Big Five" (France, Germany, Italy, Spain and the United Kingdom) are required to qualify from one of two semi-finals in order to compete for the final; the top ten countries from each semi-final progress to the final. The European Broadcasting Union (EBU) split up the competing countries into six different pots based on voting patterns from previous contests, with countries with favourable voting histories put into the same pot. The semi-final allocation draw held for the Eurovision Song Contest 2020 on 28 January 2020 was used for the 2021 contest, which the Netherlands was assigned to broadcast and vote in the first semi-final on 18 May 2021.

The two semi-finals and the final was broadcast in the Netherlands on NPO 1 and BVN with commentary by Cornald Maas and Sander Lantinga as well as via radio on NPO Radio 2 with commentary by Wouter van der Goes and Frank van 't Hof. The three shows were also broadcast on NPO 1 Extra with sign language interpretation and on NPO Zappelin Extra with Dutch audio description. AVROTROS initially appointed Duncan Laurence as its spokesperson to announced the top 12-point score awarded by the Dutch jury during the final, but he was eventually replaced by Romy Monteiro after he was absent from the show due to testing positive for COVID-19.

=== Final ===
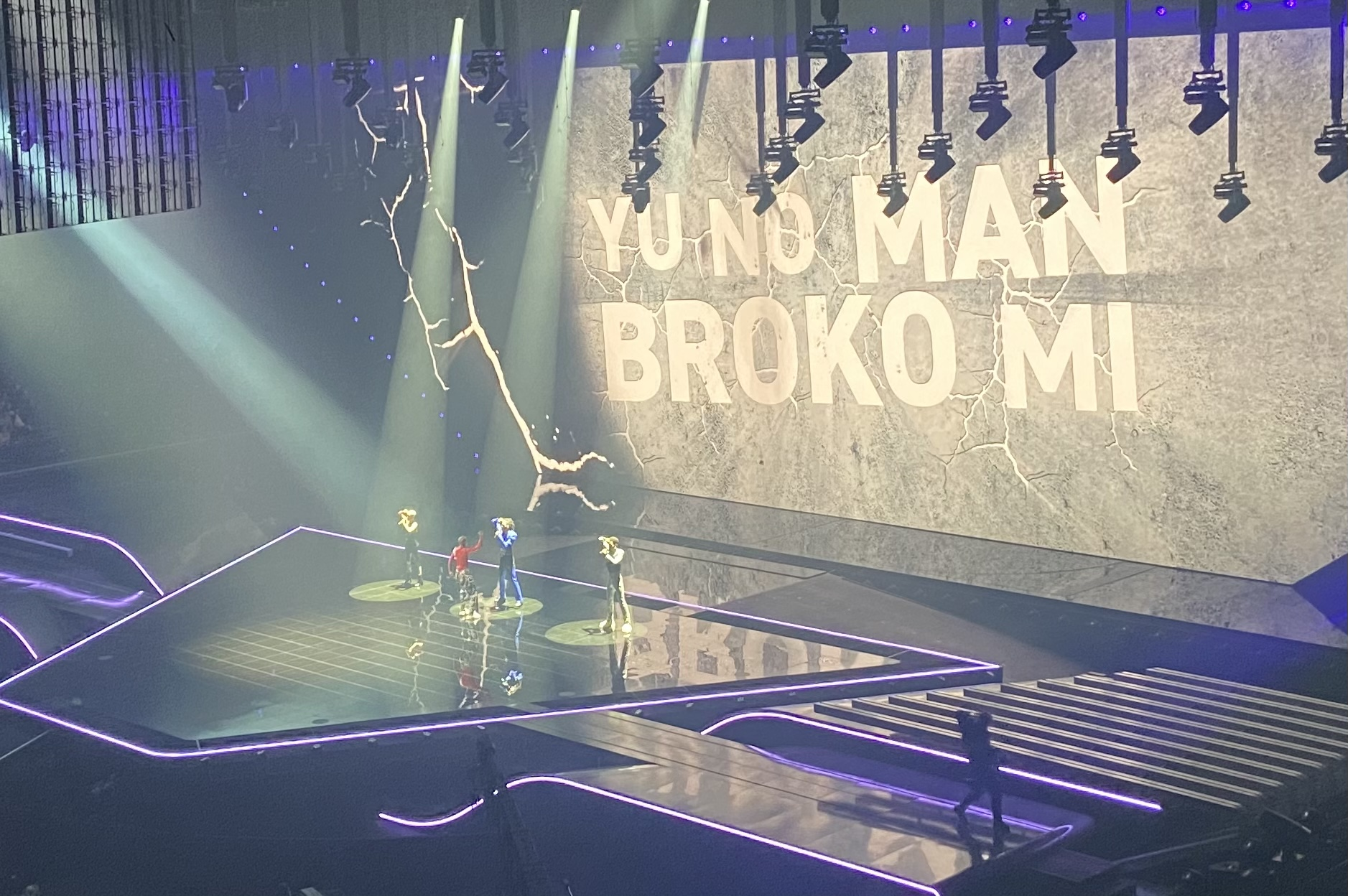
Jeangu Macrooy during a rehearsal before the first semi-final.

Jeangu Macrooy took part in technical rehearsals on 13 and 15 May, followed by dress rehearsals on 17, 21 and 22 May. This included the semi-final jury show on 17 May where an extended clip of the Dutch performance was filmed for broadcast during the live show on 18 May and the jury final on 21 May where the professional juries of each country watched and voted on the competing entries. The contest's Reference Group decided that the Netherlands' running order position in the final, drawn during the Heads of Delegation meeting on 9 March 2020, would be kept, meaning that the country would perform in position 23. Following the second semi-final, the shows' producers decided upon the running order of the final rather than through another draw, so that similar songs were not placed next to each other. While the Netherlands had already been drawn to perform in position 23, it was determined that the Netherlands would perform following Norway and before the entry from Italy.

The Dutch performance featured Jeangu Macrooy wearing a blue costume and a black chest piece underneath, designed by Lissa Brandon and Silvy ten Broeke, and performing together with two backing vocalists and a dancer in costumes of Creole, Surinamese and Maroon origin. The stage LED screens displayed cracks in a dark grey wall that got bigger and increased in amount as light that in bright white and deep orange colours came through them, while the colours of the transparent LED were red and orange with a floral set-up. Both screens also displayed the Sranan Tongo lines of the song in its original and English forms. The performers moved to the catwalk during the performance where they did a traditional dance routine as the walls on the stage LED burst down, ending with a fist on their foreheads. The two backing vocalists that joined Jeangu Macrooy were Milaisa Breeveld and his twin brother Xillan Macrooy, while the dancer was Gil Gomes Leal. The staging director for the performance was Hans Pannecoucke, who worked with the Dutch entrants between 2014 and 2016 as well as in 2018 and 2019 in a similar role. The Netherlands placed twenty-third in the final, scoring 11 points: 0 points from the televoting and 11 points from the juries.

=== Voting ===
Voting during the three shows involved each country awarding two sets of points from 1-8, 10 and 12: one from their professional jury and the other from televoting. Each participating broadcaster assembles a five-member jury panel consisting of music industry professionals who are citizens of the country they represent, with a diversity in gender and age represented. The judges assess each entry based on the performances during the second Dress Rehearsal of each show, which takes place the night before each live show, against a set of criteria including: vocal capacity; the stage performance; the song's composition and originality; and the overall impression by the act. Jury members may only take part in panel once every three years, and are obliged to confirm that they are not connected to any of the participating acts in a way that would impact their ability to vote impartially. Jury members should also vote independently, with no discussion of their vote permitted with other jury members. The exact composition of the professional jury, and the results of each country's jury and televoting were released after the grand final; the individual results from each jury member were also released in an anonymised form.

Below is a breakdown of points awarded to the Netherlands and awarded by the Netherlands in the first semi-final and grand final of the contest, and the breakdown of the jury voting and televoting conducted during the two shows:

==== Points awarded to the Netherlands ====
Points awarded to the Netherlands (Final)
Score	Televote	Jury
12 points		
10 points		
8 points		
7 points		
6 points		
5 points		
4 points		
3 points		Australia; Austria
2 points		Bulgaria; Georgia
1 point		Portugal

==== Points awarded by the Netherlands ====
Points awarded by the Netherlands (Semi-final 1)
Score	Televote	Jury
12 points	Malta	Russia
10 points	Ukraine	Belgium
8 points	Lithuania	Israel
7 points	Belgium	Malta
6 points	Israel	Ukraine
5 points	Russia	Sweden
4 points	Azerbaijan	Norway
3 points	Norway	Lithuania
2 points	Sweden	Azerbaijan
1 point	Cyprus	Romania

Points awarded by the Netherlands (Final)
Score	Televote	Jury
12 points	France	France
10 points	Greece	Iceland
8 points	Iceland	Russia
7 points	Switzerland	Malta
6 points	Portugal	Belgium
5 points	Ukraine	Switzerland
4 points	Finland	Israel
3 points	Lithuania	Ukraine
2 points	Italy	Azerbaijan
1 point	Malta	Albania

==== Detailed voting results ====
The following members comprised the Dutch jury:

- Jessica van Amerongen
- Leo Blokhuis
- Gerrit-Jan Mulder (Brainpower)
- Giovanca Ostiana
- Lakshmi Swami Persaud

Detailed voting results from the Netherlands (Semi-final 1)
R/O	Country	Jury							Televote	
R/O	Country	Juror A	Juror B	Juror C	Juror D	Juror E	Rank	Points	Rank	Points
01	Lithuania	9	6	10	6	9	8	3	3	8
02	Slovenia	15	10	7	13	13	11		15	
03	Russia	1	2	1	4	1	1	12	6	5
04	Sweden	8	7	5	9	8	6	5	9	2
05	Australia	13	12	14	11	12	14		16	
06	North Macedonia	16	16	9	16	16	15		12	
07	Ireland	10	15	11	10	14	13		11	
08	Cyprus	11	14	16	14	15	16		10	1
09	Norway	5	8	15	12	4	7	4	8	3
10	Croatia	14	13	13	8	11	12		13	
11	Belgium	3	3	2	1	2	2	10	4	7
12	Israel	4	1	4	2	5	3	8	5	6
13	Romania	12	9	8	15	10	10	1	14	
14	Azerbaijan	6	11	12	7	7	9	2	7	4
15	Ukraine	7	4	6	3	6	5	6	2	10
16	Malta	2	5	3	5	3	4	7	1	12

Detailed voting results from the Netherlands (Final)
R/O	Country	Jury							Televote	
R/O	Country	Juror A	Juror B	Juror C	Juror D	Juror E	Rank	Points	Rank	Points
01	Cyprus	13	24	21	22	24	21		20	
02	Albania	11	11	9	8	20	10	1	22	
03	Israel	9	4	3	5	7	7	4	17	
04	Belgium	6	3	6	3	6	5	6	15	
05	Russia	4	1	5	6	4	3	8	11	
06	Malta	3	5	4	7	2	4	7	10	1
07	Portugal	5	16	12	17	14	12		5	6
08	Serbia	24	22	22	23	22	23		19	
09	United Kingdom	22	20	25	20	21	22		23	
10	Greece	20	18	11	18	19	18		2	10
11	Switzerland	7	7	7	1	5	6	5	4	7
12	Iceland	1	10	1	4	1	2	10	3	8
13	Spain	14	19	15	21	18	19		24	
14	Moldova	25	23	23	24	25	24		25	
15	Germany	23	25	24	25	23	25		18	
16	Finland	19	14	13	10	15	14		7	4
17	Bulgaria	15	12	16	19	17	17		14	
18	Lithuania	18	15	14	11	13	15		8	3
19	Ukraine	10	9	8	9	8	8	3	6	5
20	France	2	2	2	2	3	1	12	1	12
21	Azerbaijan	8	6	18	13	11	9	2	16	
22	Norway	16	17	20	16	10	16		13	
23	Netherlands									
24	Italy	12	13	17	12	12	13		9	2
25	Sweden	17	8	10	15	9	11		12	
26	San Marino	21	21	19	14	16	20		21	
