= Netherlands in the Eurovision Song Contest 2020 =

- Eurovision Song Contest 2020
- Participating broadcaster: AVROTROS
- Country: Netherlands
- Selection process: Internal selection
- Announcement date: Artist: 10 January 2020; Song: 4 March 2020

Competing entry
- Song: "Grow"
- Artist: Jeangu Macrooy
- Songwriters: Jeangu Macrooy; Pieter Perquin

Placement
- Final result: Contest cancelled

Participation chronology

The Netherlands was set to be represented at the Eurovision Song Contest 2020 with the song "Grow", written by Jeangu Macrooy and Pieter Perquin, and performed by Macrooy himself. The Dutch participating broadcaster, AVROTROS, internally selected its entry for the contest. In addition, AVROTROS was also going to be the host broadcaster, along with Nederlandse Omroep Stichting (NOS) and their parent organisation Nederlandse Publieke Omroep (NPO), after winning the previous edition with the song "Arcade" performed by Duncan Laurence. Macrooy's appointment as the Dutch representative was announced on 10 January 2020, while the song, "Grow", was presented to the public on 4 March 2020.

As the host country, the Netherlands automatically qualified to compete in the final of the Eurovision Song Contest. However, the contest was cancelled due to the COVID-19 pandemic.

== Background ==
Prior to the 2020 contest, AVROTROS and its predecessor national broadcasters, had participated in the Eurovision Song Contest representing the Netherlands sixty times since NTS's debut in the inaugural contest in 1956. Since then, they have won the contest five times: in 1957 with the song "Net als toen" performed by Corry Brokken; in 1959 with the song "'n Beetje" by Teddy Scholten; in 1969 as one of four countries to tie for first place with "De troubadour" by Lenny Kuhr; in 1975 with "Ding-a-dong" by the group Teach-In; and finally in 2019 with "Arcade" by Duncan Laurence. Following the introduction of semi-finals for the 2004 contest, they had featured in seven finals. The Dutch least successful result has been last place, which they have achieved on five occasions, most recently in the second semi-final of the 2011 contest. The Netherlands has also received nul points on two occasions; in 1962 and 1963.

As part of its duties as participating broadcaster, AVROTROS organises the selection of its entry in the Eurovision Song Contest and broadcasts the event in the country. The Dutch broadcaster has used various methods to select its entry in the past, such as the Nationaal Songfestival, a live televised national final to choose the performer, song or both to compete at Eurovision. However, internal selections have also been held on occasion. Since 2013, the broadcaster has internally selected its entry for the contest. In 2013, the internal selection of "Birds" performed by Anouk managed to take them to the final for the first time in eight years and placed ninth overall. In 2014, the internal selection of "Calm After the Storm" performed by the Common Linnets qualified to the final once again and placed second, while the internal selection of Duncan Laurence in 2019 managed to achieve a Dutch victory for the first time since 1975. For 2020, the broadcaster opted to continue selecting its entry through an internal selection.

== Before Eurovision ==
=== Internal selection ===
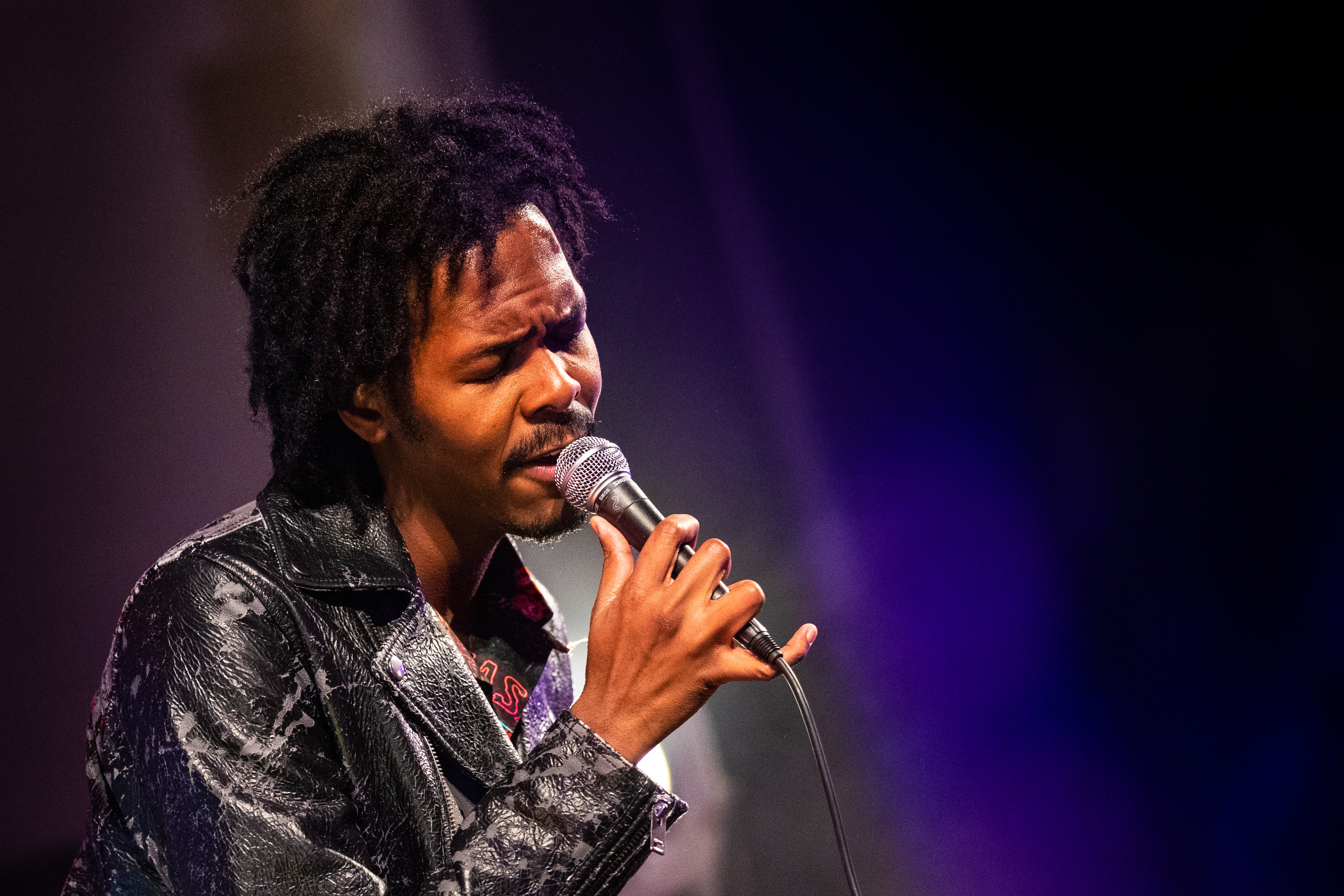
Jeangu Macrooy was internally selected to represent the Netherlands in the Eurovision Song Contest 2020

Following their victory in 2019 with the song "Arcade" performed by Duncan Laurence, the Dutch broadcaster revealed in September 2019 that they would continue to internally select both the artist and song for the Eurovision Song Contest. A submission period was opened by the broadcaster on 17 October 2019 where artists and composers were able to submit their entries until 8 December 2019. Dutch media later rumoured that four entries had been shortlisted by AVROTROS and that their performers were singers Davina Michelle, Shirma Rouse, Thomas Berge and Jordan Roy.

On 9 January 2020, Dutch media reported that AVROTROS had selected Surinamese singer Jeangu Macrooy to represent the Netherlands at the 2020 contest. Jeangu Macrooy was confirmed as the Dutch entrant on 10 January 2020 during the NPO Radio 1 programme Humberto. The selection of Macrooy as the Dutch representative occurred through the decision of a selection commission consisting of AVROTROS general director Eric van Stade, television host and author Cornald Maas, singer and television host Jan Smit, radio DJs Coen Swijnenberg and Sander Lantinga, and Dutch Eurovision delegation member Joyce Hoedelmans. In regards to his selection as the Dutch entrant, Jeangu Macrooy stated: "I am indescribably honoured! It's a dream come true and the most beautiful thing that has come my way so far. My team and I are excited to make the Netherlands proud! Let's go!"

On 4 March 2020, Jeangu Macrooy's Eurovision entry, "Grow", was presented to the public through the release of the official music video, directed by Joe Roberts, via the official Eurovision Song Contest's YouTube channel. The song was written by Jeangu Macrooy himself together with Pieter Perquin. In regards to the song, Macrooy stated: "Emotions, good and bad, are a universal language. I hope this song makes people feel a little less lonely in their search for happiness. I think that openness and honesty about how we really feel will ultimately bring us closer. I believe in the power music has to bring people together. It's the reason I do what I do."

== At Eurovision ==
According to Eurovision rules, all nations with the exceptions of the host country and the "Big Five" (France, Germany, Italy, Spain and the United Kingdom) are required to qualify from one of two semi-finals in order to compete for the final; the top ten countries from each semi-final progress to the final. As the host country, the Netherlands automatically qualified to compete in the final on 16 May 2020. In addition to their participation in the final, the Netherlands is also required to broadcast and vote in one of the two semi-finals. During the semi-final allocation draw on 28 January 2020, the Netherlands was assigned to broadcast and vote in the first semi-final on 12 May 2020. However, due to the COVID-19 pandemic, the contest was cancelled. The European Broadcasting Union (EBU) later confirmed that the Netherlands would remain as the host country of the 2021 contest.

As the host nation, the Netherlands' running order position in the final was decided through a random draw that took place during the Heads of Delegation meeting in Rotterdam on 9 March 2020. The Netherlands was set to perform in position 23.
