= De diepte =

2022 song by S10

Single by S10

from the album Ik besta voor altijd zolang jij aan mij denkt
- Language: Dutch
- Released: 3 March 2022
- Length: 2:56
- Label: Noah's Ark
- Songwriters: Arno Krabman; Stien den Hollander

S10 singles chronology
"De leven" (2022)	"De diepte" (2022)	"Laat me los" (2022)

Music video
- "De diepte" on YouTube

Eurovision Song Contest 2022 entry
- Country: Netherlands
- Artist: S10
- Language: Dutch

Finals performance
- Semi-final result: 2nd
- Semi-final points: 221
- Final result: 11th
- Final points: 171

Entry chronology
- ◄ "Birth of a New Age" (2021)
- "Burning Daylight" (2023) ►

"De diepte" (Dutch: [də ˈdiptə]; transl. "The depth") is a single by Dutch singer S10. The song represented the Netherlands in the Eurovision Song Contest 2022 in Turin, Italy, after being selected by the Dutch public broadcaster AVROTROS. It is the first time since 2010 that a song sung entirely in Dutch represented the country at Eurovision. A week after the contest, the song topped the Dutch singles chart. The song was later included in S10's third studio album, Ik besta voor altijd zolang jij aan mij denkt, released on 28 October 2022.

== Background ==
The song tells about Den Hollander's most personal memories. According to Den Hollander, "It's a tribute to the sadness and memories that you carry with you. Everyone experiences difficult times in their lives. That's something we all have in common and I hope [people] will feel less alone when [they] listen to the song".

== Release ==
The song was released on 3 March 2022. A reveal event for the song took place on the same day at 11:15 (CET) in the Tuschinski Theatre.

== Eurovision Song Contest ==
=== Selection ===
On 24 May 2021, shortly after the final of the Eurovision Song Contest 2021, the Dutch broadcaster AVROTROS announced its participation in the following edition and opened submissions for interested artists to present its selection committee with up to three songs, with the deadline being 31 August 2021. The selection committee consisted of Eric van Stade, Cornald Maas, Jan Smit, Sander Lantinga, Coen Swijnenberg and Joyce Hoedelmans. The selection process was carried out under the supervision of Dutch head of delegation Lars Lourenco.

AVROTROS announced S10 as the Dutch entrant on 7 December 2021. On 25 January 2022, the creative team to support S10 in the preparations for her entry was announced, consisting of creative supervisor Wouter van Ransbeek, director Marnix Kaart and lighting designer Henk Jan van Beek. On 21 February, Frits Huffnagel claimed that the song would be presented on 3 March, which was confirmed by the broadcaster the following day.

=== At Eurovision ===
According to Eurovision rules, all nations with the exceptions of the host country and the "Big Five" (France, Germany, Italy, Spain and the United Kingdom) are required to qualify from one of two semi-finals in order to compete for the final; the top ten countries from each semi-final progress to the final. The European Broadcasting Union (EBU) split up the competing countries into six different pots based on voting patterns from previous contests, with countries with favourable voting histories put into the same pot. On 25 January 2022, an allocation draw was held which placed each country into one of the two semi-finals, as well as which half of the show they would perform in. The Netherlands was placed into the first semi-final, held on 10 May 2022, and performed in the first half of the show.

In the first semi final, the Netherlands qualified for the final, as the last qualifier to be announced. The country eventually finished in 11th place with 171 points.

== Charts ==
=== Weekly charts ===
Weekly chart performance for "De diepte"
Chart (2022)	Peak position
Belgium (Ultratop 50 Flanders)	4
Greece International (IFPI Greece)	60
Iceland (Tónlistinn)	9
Lithuania (AGATA)	8
Netherlands (Dutch Top 40)	1
Netherlands (Single Top 100)	1
Sweden (Sverigetopplistan)	44
UK Singles Downloads (Official Charts)	38

=== Year-end charts ===
2022 year-end chart performance for "De diepte"
Chart (2022)	Position
Belgium (Ultratop 50 Flanders)	96
Netherlands (Dutch Top 40)	22
Netherlands (Single Top 100)	26

== Certifications ==
Certifications for "De diepte"
Region	Certification	Certified units/sales
Belgium (BRMA)	Platinum	40,000^{‡}
Netherlands (NVPI)	Platinum	80,000^{‡}
^{‡} Sales+streaming figures based on certification alone.
