= Pete Philly and Perquisite =

Pete Philly & Perquisite
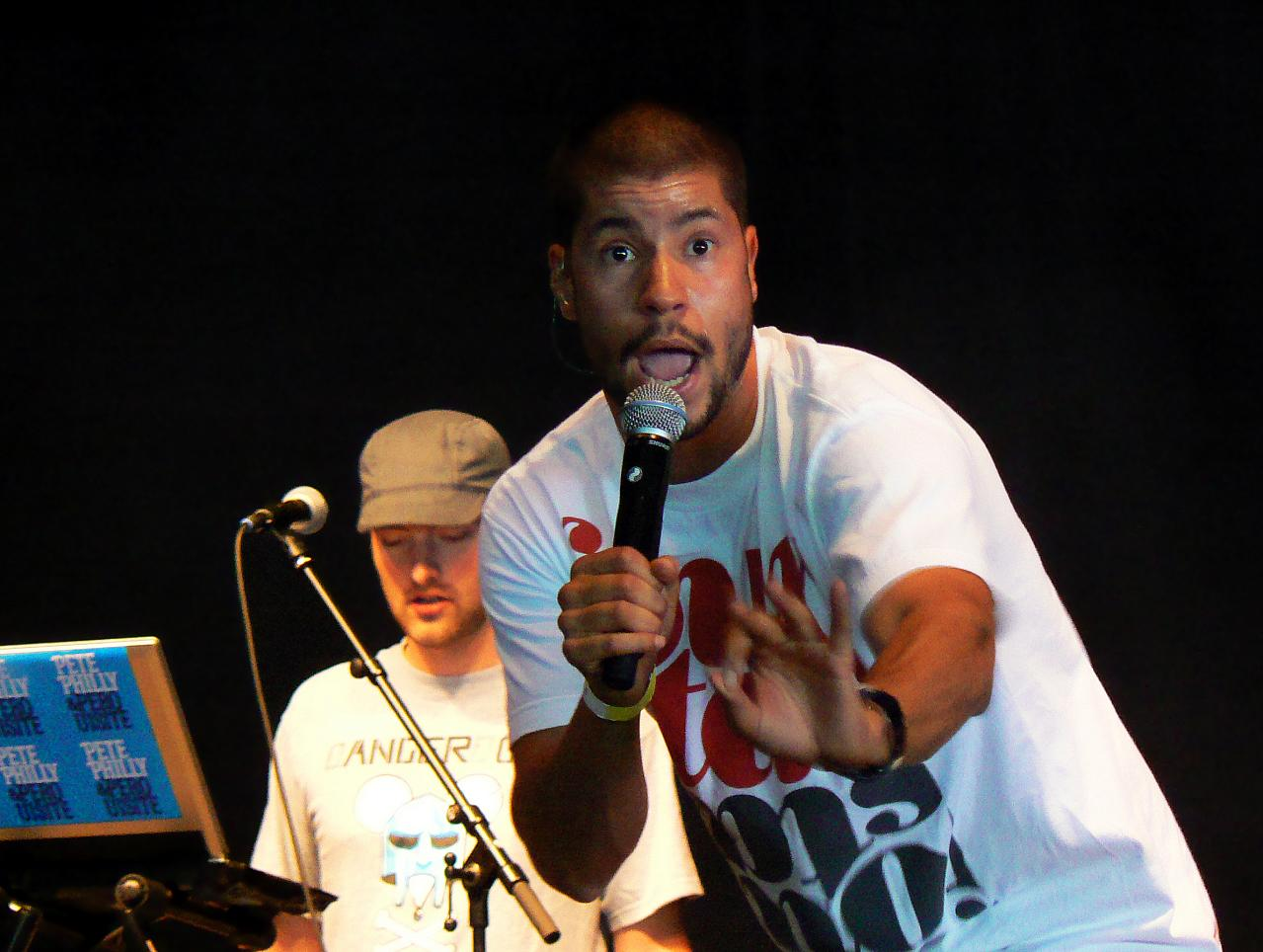

Background information
- Origin: The Netherlands
- Genres: Hip hop Jazz; Soul
- Years active: 2003–2009, 2023-present
- Labels: Unexpected Records; Epitaph Records; ANTI; P-Vine Records; Handcuts Records
- Members: Pete Philly (Pedro Philip Monzón); Perquisite (Pieter Perquin)
- Website: petephillyandperquisite.com

Pete Philly & Perquisite is a hip hop duo from the Netherlands consisting of Pedro Philip Monzón (born May 28, 1980, in Aruba) as the MC/vocalist and Pieter "Perquisite" Perquin (born 1982 in Amsterdam) as the musicproducer and composer. Their music is best described as hip hop with influences from jazz, broken beat and soul.

== Mindstate ==
Pete Philly and Perquisite both had musical careers before they met in the autumn of 2002. Pete Philly was part of funk formation Gotcha! and hip-hop group Nicotine and in 2002 took part as a solo performer in the 'Grote Prijs van Nederland' where he won the award for best musician. Perquisite released two solo EP's (2001 & 2002) on his own label Unexpected Records on which he worked with jazz musicians Benjamin Herman and David Kweksilber.

In the fall of 2002, Pete Philly and Perquisite met through a mutual friend after which they quickly decided to start working together. Their first collaboration took place within temporary formation North West Metropolis, whose EP Expressions was released in 2003 on Perquisite's label, Unexpected Records. Pete & Perq decided to continue to collaborate and in January 2004 their first EP The Mindstate EP was released. The EP received a lot of critical acclaim which stimulated Pete Philly & Perquisite to create a full album out of the original EP. Each track of the album would represent a certain state of mind, hence the title Mindstate. The actual writing, recording and producing of the much anticipated album took about a year, and included collaborations with fellow Dutch rapper Cee-Major of (The Proov), Dutch singer Senna and American rapper Talib Kweli.

Their debut album was received very positively internationally with raving reviews in The Sun (UK), Visions (DE), Kingsize (SE), DJ Magazine (UK) and Notion Magazine (UK) who called it 'as much 21st century soul as hiphop genius'. In March 2005 the album was released in Japan through Unexpected Records / Handcuts Records and in April it was released all over Europe through Unexpected Records / Epitaph Europe. The duo did create a very solid fanbase with performances with their live formation across Europe and also in the US and South Africa. Their success led them to winning an Essent Award and a Zilveren Harp. They were also nominated for a Dutch MOBO-award, three TMF awards, the MTV European Music Award and for the prestigious Edison-award. On August 20, 2006, they performed at the A Campingflight to Lowlands Paradise-festival for the second time, this time performing with the New Generation Big Band and in September of that same year they finished the Mindstate tour in a sold out Melkweg, Amsterdam.

== Remindstate ==
After the last show of the Mindstate tour Pete & Perq took a break to work on their second album. During this non-touring period 'Remindstate' was released, the totally remixed version of the Mindstate album. The record, which was released January 2007, included remixes from several musical friends of the duo like Seiji of Bugz in the Attic, Nicolay, C-Mon & Kypski, Morgan Spacek, Laidback Luke and the Metropole Orchestra and was well received by both the audience and press.

== Mystery Repeats ==
In September 2007 Pete & Perq's second album, Mystery Repeats, was released in the Netherlands through Unexpected Records / ANTI Records. A Belgium release followed on January 21, 2008, the European release on February 18 and the Japanese release (through Handcuts Records) on March 5, 2008. The album entered on the first position in the Dutch album charts in the week of its release and the first single 'Time Flies' received a lot of radio- and airplay, especially in the Netherlands. Pete & Perq started their live tour in a sold out Melkweg and started to play all over Europe. In March 2008 they toured around Japan and in April of that same year they toured together with Leeroy from Saian Supa Crew in Germany. In the summer of 2008 they played at well known festivals across Europe including Sziget (HU), Nuke (AT), Exit (SR), Lowlands (NL), HipHop Open (DE), North Sea Jazz (NL), Printemps de Bourges (FR), Gurtenfestival (CH) and Summerjam (DE). When they got back they received the prestigious 'Amsterdam Award of Art', the most important award of the city, presented by the Amsterdam mayor, Job Cohen. At this time their third single 'Mystery Repeats' entered the Dutch Top 40 and became their most successful single to date. They were also nominated for a second time for an MTV European Music Award.

== Break-up ==
After this extensive touring period, Pete and Perq decided it was time to focus on other projects besides Pete Philly & Perquisite. With the ‘Final Celebration Tour’, they toured various Dutch theaters, with their final show being a sold-out performance at the Melkweg Rabozaal in Amsterdam on October 29, 2009. Over the next 14 years, both Pete and Perq focused on their solo careers. Pete Philly released two solo albums, an EP and several singles, and produced music for commercials. Perquisite also released a solo album, composed around a dozen film scores including Carmen of the North and Niemand in de Stad, and collaborated with Kris Berry, Jeangu Macrooy, Swan and several other artists on new songs and albums.

== Reunion & Eon ==
In early 2023, Perq received a call from Pete, who had been reminiscing about the past. He realized how much he valued their collaboration and suggested a reunion. Perquisite got excited too and together with their booking agent Friendly Fire, they made plans to return to the stage. They also returned to the studio and just like in old times, they crafted one song after another. Pete Philly & Perquisite gave a grand reunion concert at AFAS Live in Amsterdam on November 17 2023, of which OOR Magazine said that they were ‘back at the top’. Furthermore, they announced their official third studio album 'Eon' to be released on May 3rd 2024. 'Eon' received lots of critical acclaim in both The Netherlands and abroad. Their first new single ‘Hot Sauce’, which was released in September 2023, became TopSong on Radio 2, the Netherlands’ biggest radio station. Their second single ‘Mayhem’, a captivating collaboration with Naaz, was released in January 2024, followed by ‘My Stereo’ in April, which was accompanied by a groundbreaking AI music video featuring all of their musical heroes.

After a successful European Album Release Tour in 2024, during which Pete & Perq performed in ten cities including London, Berlin, and Paris, the duo announced a new tour for 2025: the Time Flies Theater Tour. During this tour, Pete Philly & Perquisite performed in eleven Dutch theaters between April and June. They also took the stage with Jeangu Macrooy at Hootananny in London on April 3rd, 2025, and performed at the Tonart Festival in Switzerland on April 26th.

== Awards and nominations ==
2005

- Mindstate ‘Disque Pop de la Semaine’ (VPRO radio)
- Winner Essent Award
- Nominated for Best Album of the year by 3voor12ists of the full English name of the current month with initial capital, a space, and the year, not full dates; e.g., "January 2013", but not "jan13". Any deviation from these two rules will result in an "invalid date parameter" error.
- Nominated for 2 Dutch Mobo Awards: Best Live Act and Best Album

2006

- Winner Silver Harp (Zilveren Harp)
- Winner Kink FM Live XS Award: Best New Live Act
- Nominated for 2 Edisons: Best Group and Best New Group
- Nominated for 3 3FM Awards: Best Artist R&B & HipHop, Best Album and Best New Artist
- Nominated for TMF Awards: Best New Artist
- Nominated for MTV European Music Award: Best Dutch/Belgian Act (Other nominees: Kane, Deus, Anouk, Gabriel Rios)
- Nominated for Urban Awards: Best Live Act
- Nominated for Party Peeps 2000 Awards: Best Live Act
- Winner of the Gouden Greep 2006 for Most Original Collaboration and nominated for Best Group and Best Live Act

2007

- Nominated for 2 Urban Awards: Best Album & Best Live Act
- Nominated for 6 Gouden Grepen: Best Group, Best Album, Best Live Act, Best Song, Best Video, Best Producer

2008

- Nominated for Gouden Notenkraker: Music
- Nominated for 3FM Awards: Best Artist Alternative
- Winner of the Amsterdamprijs voor de Kunst
- Nominated for MTV Europe Music Award
- Nominated for three State Awards: Best Group, Best Live Act & Best Single

== Discography ==
=== Albums en Ep's ===
Album title	Release date	Charting in the Dutch Album Top 100			Comments
Album title	Release date	Date of entry	Highest	Weeks	Comments
Mindstate EP (EP)	15-01-2004				
Mindstate	18-04-2005	27-08-2005	52	29	
Remindstate	22-01-2007	27-01-2007	49	4	Remix-album of Mindstate
Mystery Repeats	10-09-2007	15-09-2007	2	25	
Mystery Repeats - The Live Edition	01-12-2008	-			Album Mystery Repeats with extra live cd
Eon	03-05-2024	-			
My Stereo (Fluid Funk Remixes) (EP)	03-05-2024	-			

=== Singles ===
Single title	Release date	Charting in the Dutch Top 40			Comments
Single title	Release date	Date of entry	Highest	Weeks	Comments
Insomnia	07-03-2005	-			
Grateful	03-10-2005	-			
Mellow	27-03-2006	-			With Senna
Time Flies	20-08-2007	-			
Empire	04-02-2008	-			
Mystery Repeats	21-07-2008	23-08-2008	34	3	
Q&A	24-11-2008	-			
Time Flies (2023 Remaster)	07-07-2023	-			
Hot Sauce	08-09-2023	-			
Mayhem	26-01-2024	-			With Naaz
My Stereo	05-04-2024	-			
