= Unexpected Records =

Dutch record label

Unexpected Records is a Dutch record label founded by composer/producer Perquisite, who is part of the hip hop duo Pete Philly & Perquisite.

== History ==
The label was founded in 2001, in Amsterdam, with the main goal of focusing on Groove based music. A wide range of genres have been covered so far, ranging from Hip hop and Electronic Music to Soul, Jazz, and Indie. Their best selling albums so far have been Mindstate and Mystery Repeats by Pete Philly & Perquisite, Lovestruck Puzzles by Kris Berry & Perquisite, and High On You by Jeangu Macrooy.

== Artists ==
The label has released albums with or collaborated with the following artists within a release:

- Pete Philly & Perquisite
- Jeangu Macrooy
- Swan
- Kris Berry & Perquisite
- Perquisite
- Benjamin Herman
- David Kweksilber
- The Proov
- Monsieur Dubois
- Arts the Beatdoctor
- SliderInc
- Renske Taminiau
- GMB
- Sticks
- Maurino Alaracon
- Cato van Dijk (My Baby)
- Torre Florim (De Staat)
- Janne Schra
- CeeMajor
- Kain Slim
- GINGE
- Rednose Distrikt
- Skiggy Rapz
- Senna
- New Generation Big Band
- Collective Efforts
- Laagman
- Crackman
- C-Mon & Kypski
- Omar REy
- Metropole Orkest
- Nicolay
- Laidback Luke
- Morgan Spacek
- Xillan
- A Milli
- Mason
- Naaz
- Darin G.
- DJ Mitsu
- DJ PCM
- Seji
- Sense
- Toni Shift
- Sanguita
- Urita
- Jiggy Djé
- Turk
- Forecast Jah Reign
- Typhoon
- Duvel
- Drumtrum
- Bar/Dancing
- Jenny Lena
- Henk Hofstede (Nits)
- Jay Colin
- Dazzled Kid
- Sotu The Traveller
- Ascension
- Shirazi Vibe
- Klankarbeit
- Danou P
- Gregor Salto
- Beau Zwart
- Sykes
- Foutk
