= Birth of a New Age =

2021 song by Jeangu Macrooy

Single by Jeangu Macrooy
- Language: English, Sranan Tongo
- Released: 4 March 2021
- Genre: Soul; Kawina
- Length: 2:53
- Songwriters: Jeangu Macrooy; Pieter Perquin
- Producers: Jeangu Macrooy; Pieter Perquin

Jeangu Macrooy singles chronology
"Grow" (2020)	"Birth of a New Age" (2021)

Music video
- "Birth of a New Age" on YouTube

Eurovision Song Contest 2021 entry
- Country: Netherlands
- Artist: Jeangu Macrooy
- Composers: Jeangu Macrooy and Pieter Perquin
- Lyricists: Jeangu Macrooy and Pieter Perquin

Finals performance
- Final result: 23rd
- Final points: 11

Entry chronology
- ◄ "Grow" (2020)
- "De diepte" (2022) ►

"Birth of a New Age" is a song by Surinamese singer-songwriter Jeangu Macrooy. The song represented the Netherlands in the Eurovision Song Contest 2021 in Rotterdam, the Netherlands. The music video was recorded in the Rijksmuseum. In the song, Macrooy calls for resilience and authenticity. The song is mostly written in English and partly in Sranan Tongo, a lingua franca in Suriname.

== Music video ==
On 4 March 2021 Macrooy and the broadcaster AVROTROS announced via a livestream that Birth of a New Age would be the Dutch entry of the Eurovision Songfestival. The next day the official music video was presented. The recordings were shot in the Rijksmuseum, in the Tropenmuseum and in the Koepelkerk (Ronde Lutherse Kerk) in Amsterdam, under the direction of Kevin Osepa and cinematography of Jasper Wolf.

== Composition ==
The genre of Birth of a New Age is soul combined with percussion and the exchange of call and response from kawina, a genre that originated in Suriname, Macrooy's birth country. The choir consists of sixty voices that were recorded by three singers: Jeangu Macrooy, his twin brother Xillan Macrooy and singer Milaisa Breeveld. In addition, the voice of fellow composer Pieter Perquin can be heard at the beginning of the song.

The basis of the song was from Macrooy, who finished it on 17 December 2020. He worked further on it with Pieter Perquin. While composing, Macrooy and Perquin did not begin with a defined song structure like verse-refrain-verse-refrain-bridge-refrain; instead, they built it piece by piece, and tried out new elements when they popped up. With the choir at the beginning of the song, it therefore looks like the song has two refrains and an ending of its own.

== Lyrics ==
Macrooy had already written a poem that would become the song's lyrics before he started with Perquin to work out the music. According to Macrooy, this poem would not have existed if the developments in 2020 around Black Lives Matter had not occurred. Those gave him the feeling that the struggle of sixty years ago had not been lost. The demonstrations meant a lot to him. Being there at a demonstration, it inspired him that he did not only see black people around him, and that he saw a lot of young people there. "In fact that is the new age I am singing about," said the singer.

While composing, Macrooy also decided to sing partly in Sranan Tongo; this is the language of the refrain, whereas the verses are sung in English. He sings the following sentence a number of times: "Yu no man broko mi, mi na afu sensi," which can be translated as: "You can't break me, even if you think that I am inferior." The last part of the sentence literally signifies "that I'm half a cent", which was the smallest coin in Suriname in colonial times. Macrooy makes use here of what is being called an odo in Suriname, in other words a life wisdom which was passed on among enslaved.

Because of his choice, Sranan Tongo marks a new step in its development. It originated in the 17th century because the enslaved were not allowed to speak Dutch, whilst they did not have a common African background. Later on, Sranan Tongo was forbidden and Dutch language made mandatory. Then, during the 1950s, Sranan Tongo was allowed, but regarded as an inferior language and discouraged socially. Since the independence of Suriname in 1975, it became gradually more accepted. "Birth of a New Age" marked the first time that Sranan Tongo was heard on the Eurovision stage.

== Mural ==
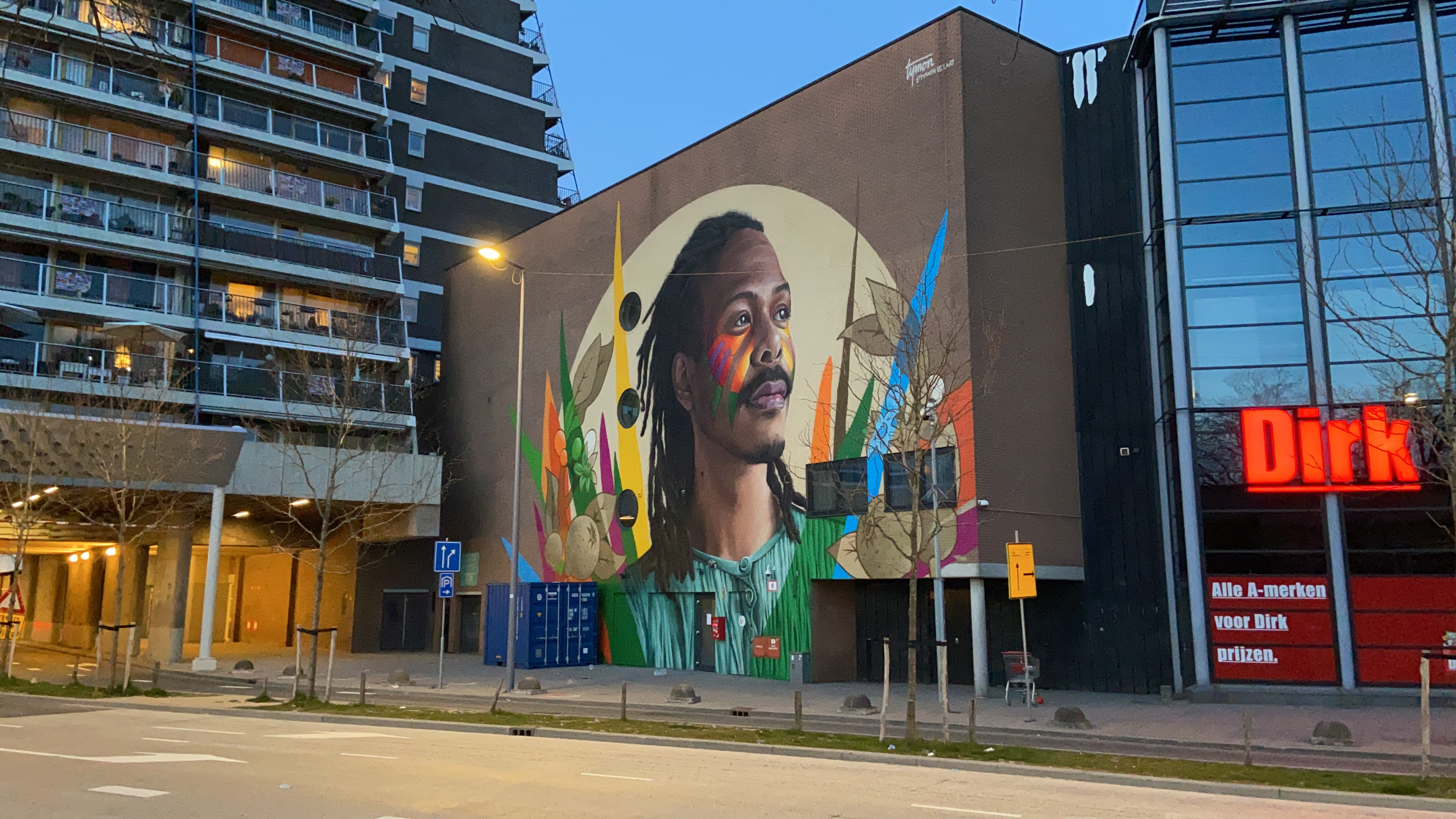
Mural of Macrooy in Rotterdam, by painter Tymon de Laat

As a part of the artist project #UPStreetRotterdam visual artist Tymon de Laat completed his artwork with the title Birth of a New Age on 19 April 2021. He made a mural near Ahoy Rotterdam and signed it in the presence of Macrooy, in a joint action at an aerial work platform.

== Eurovision Song Contest ==
=== Internal selection ===
On 18 March 2020, directly after the cancellation of the Eurovision Song Contest 2020, the national broadcaster AVROTROS announced its intent to again host the Eurovision Song Contest 2021, and to keep Macrooy as the nation's representative for the event.

=== At Eurovision ===
As the host country, the Netherlands automatically qualified to compete in the final. It was the 23rd performance in the final on 22 May 2021.

Because of the COVID-19 pandemic, the 2021 edition of the festival was held with a small test audience, called "field lab".

== Charts ==
Chart performance for "Birth of a New Age"
Chart (2021)	Peak position
Belgium (Ultratip Bubbling Under Flanders)	40
Lithuania (AGATA)	94
Netherlands (Dutch Top 40)	37
Netherlands (Single Top 100)	30
Suriname (Magic 10)	1

== See also ==
- Music of Suriname
- SuriPop
