= High on You =

High on You may refer to:

- High on You (Sly Stone album)
- High on You (Jeangu Macrooy album)
- "High on You" (Sigma and John Newman song)
- "High on You" (Survivor song)
