= Grow (Jeangu Macrooy song) =

2020 song by Jeangu Macrooy

Single by Jeangu Macrooy
- Released: 4 March 2020
- Length: 2:59
- Label: Unexpected
- Songwriter(s): Jeangu Macrooy
- Producer(s): Jeangu Macrooy; Pieter Perquin

Jeangu Macrooy singles chronology
"Second Hand Lover" (2019)	"Grow" (2020)	"Birth of a New Age" (2021)

Eurovision Song Contest 2020 entry
- Country: Netherlands
- Artist(s): Jeangu Macrooy
- Language: English
- Composer(s): Jeangu Macrooy; Pieter Perquin
- Lyricist(s): Jeangu Macrooy

Finals performance
- Final result: Contest cancelled

Entry chronology
- ◄ "Arcade" (2019)
- "Birth of a New Age" (2021) ►

"Grow" is a song by Surinamese singer-songwriter Jeangu Macrooy. Released on 4 March 2020, the song would have represented host nation the Netherlands in the Eurovision Song Contest 2020 in Rotterdam.

== Background ==
The song is about his personal story about getting older and his quest to find himself. The song was written by Macrooy, with all instruments and arrangements by Perquisite & Macrooy. when talking about the song, Macrooy said, "Emotions, good and bad, are a universal language. I hope this song makes people feel a little less lonely in their search for happiness. I think that openness and honesty about how we really feel will ultimately bring us closer. I believe in the power music has to bring people together. It’s the reason I do what I do." His creative team would have made up of Hans Pannecoucke (director), Marco Driessen (lighting) and Perquisite (creative supervisor).

== Eurovision Song Contest ==
The song would have represented the Netherlands in the Eurovision Song Contest 2020, after Jeangu Macrooy was internally selected by the national broadcaster AVROTROS. As the host country, the Netherlands automatically qualified to compete in the final, which would have been held on 16 May 2020 in Rotterdam, Netherlands. It would have been performed 23rd in the final. The contest was later cancelled as a result of the COVID-19 pandemic.

== Music video ==
The official video of the song, directed by Joe Roberts, was released on 4 March 2020.

== Charts ==
Chart (2020)	Peak position
Netherlands (Dutch Top 40)	29
Netherlands (Single Top 100)	48

== Release history ==
Region	Date	Label	Format	Ref.
Netherlands	4 March 2020	Unexpected	Digital download, streaming	
