= High on You (Jeangu Macrooy album) =

Studio album by Jeangu Macrooy
- Released: 14 April 2017
- Recorded: 2016
- Label: Unexpected Records

Jeangu Macrooy chronology
Brave Enough (2016)	High on You (2017)	Horizon (2019)

Singles from High on You
- 1. "Step into the Water" Released: 1 March 2017; 2. "Crazy Kids" Released: 17 May 2017; 3. "High On You" Released: 4 September 2017; 4. "Tell Me Father" Released: 30 November 2017

High on You is the debut studio album by Surinamese singer-songwriter Jeangu Macrooy. It was released on 14 April 2017 by Unexpected Records. The album includes the singles "Step Into the Water", "Crazy Kids", "High On You" and "Tell Me Father". The album peaked at number 69 on the Dutch Albums Chart. In 2018, it was nominated for Best Album at the Edison Awards.

== Singles ==
"Step Into the Water" was released as the lead single from the album on 1 March 2017. "Crazy Kids" was released as the second single from the album on 17 May 2017. "High On You" was released as the third single from the album on 4 September 2017. "Tell Me Father" was released as the fourth and final single from the album on 30 November 2017.

== Track listing ==
No.	Title	Length
1.	"Aisa"	2:43
2.	"Step into the Water"	3:02
3.	"Crazy Kids" (feat. Xillan)	3:15
4.	"Antidote"	3:39
5.	"Fire Raging"	3:36
6.	"High on You"	3:23
7.	"Sleep You Off"	3:14
8.	"Head over Heels"	2:30
9.	"One Way Ticket"	2:58
10.	"Tell Me Father"	3:09
11.	"Ablaze"	2:42
12.	"Circles"	3:56
13.	"In the Name Of"	4:10

== Charts ==
Chart (2017)	Peak position
Dutch Albums (Album Top 100)	68

== Release history ==
Country	Date	Label	Format
Netherlands	14 April 2017	Unexpected Records	Digital download; streaming
