= Ruben Hein =

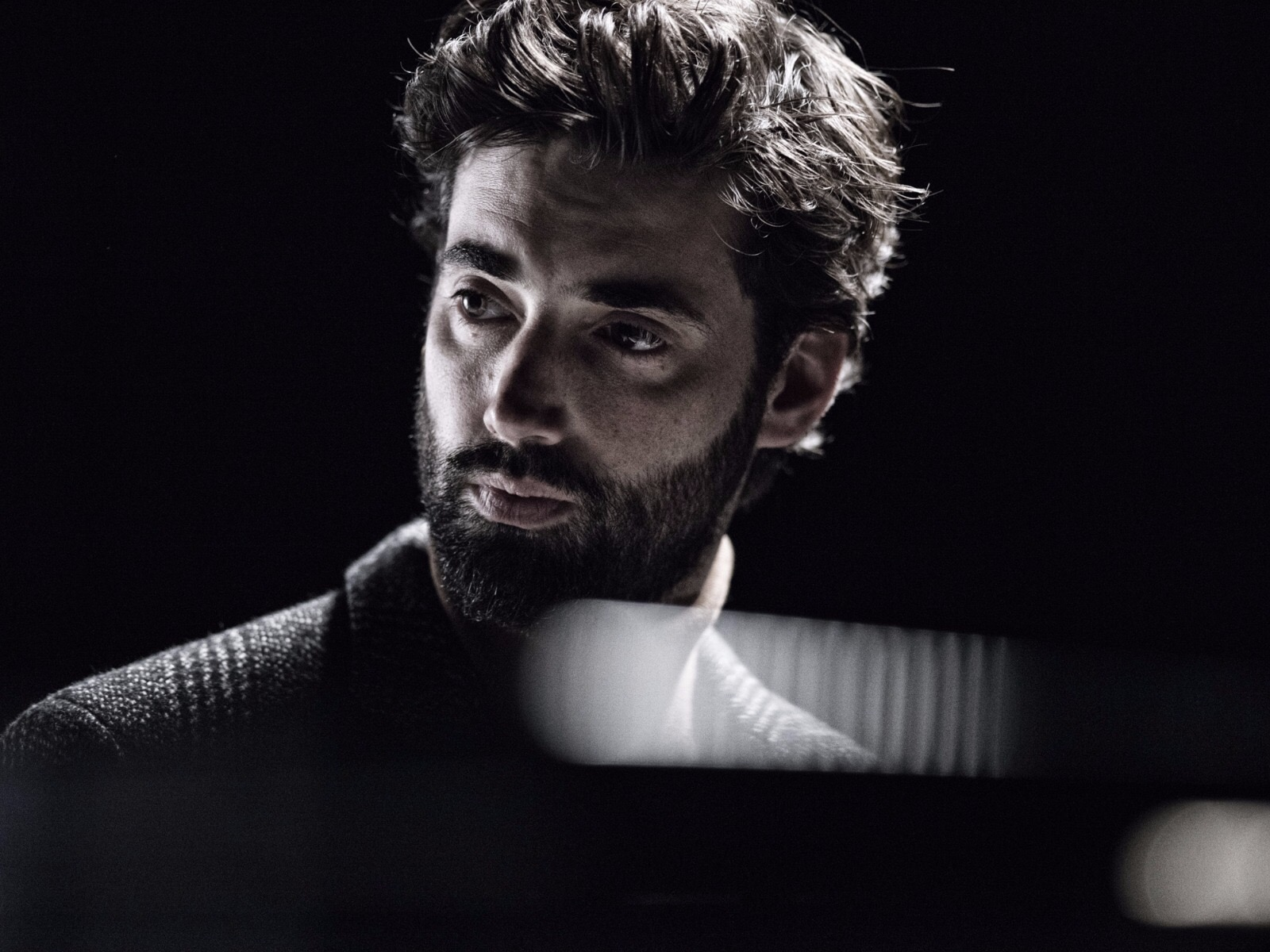
- Ruben Hein in 2018

Background information
- Born: 8 June 1982 (age 44); Bemmel, Netherlands
- Genres: pop, jazz
- Instrument: Piano
- Years active: 2008–present
- Label: V2 Records

Ruben Hein (born 8 June 1982) is a Dutch singer, pianist, and composer in jazz and pop music.

== Biography ==
=== Early life ===
Ruben Hein grew up in the Gelderland town of Bemmel. There he attended primary school at IKC Pius X. Subsequently, he attended the Stedelijk Gymnasium Nijmegen. After secondary school, he went to the Conservatorium van Amsterdam, which he completed in 2008 in the Jazz Piano department.

=== Blue Note ===
Hein played in Hans Teeuwen's band and with Pete Philly and Perquisite. He came second at the Dutch Jazz Vocalists Competition.

In the summer of 2010, Hein signed a contract with the jazz label Blue Note. In close collaboration with producers Stefan Kruger (Zuco 103) and Fons Merkies he recorded his debut album Loose Fit at the Gula Studios in Malmö, which was released on 29 October 2010. Ahead of this, the first single Elephants was released on 20 August 2010. He subsequently toured with his own music and played at various festivals at home and abroad, such as the North Sea Jazz Festival, Eurosonic Noorderslag and the Java Jazz Festival in Jakarta, Indonesia.

In May 2011, during a concert celebrating Withers' 40th anniversary in music, Ruben Hein met one of his great inspirations, Bill Withers. During this concert, Hein performed, among other songs, Ain't No Sunshine in front of Withers himself and a sold-out Royal Theater Carré. Afterwards, Hein called this “one of the most exciting moments in my life”.

In October 2011, he collaborated with the Metropole Orkest (conducted by Jules Buckley) and singer-songwriter Jonathan Jeremiah at a sold-out Carré. A live albumof this concert was released, titled Ruben Hein Live. Additionally, in December 2011, Hein performed with Oleta Adams and the Royal Concertgebouw Orchestra at the Concertgebouw in Amsterdam.

In 2012, a third CD followed, titled Revisited. On this record, Hein can be heard more as a pianist. Several songs from Loose Fit are freely interpreted, but emphatically without vocals. The album was made with drummer Joost Patocka and bassist Ernst Glerum.

In 2011, Hein was nominated for two 3FM Awards in the categories Best Male Singer and Best Newcomer. He also received a nomination for the Edison Audience Award in 2011. In 2012, he won a Radio 6 Award in the category Best Soul and was nominated for an Edison once again, this time for the Live CD in the Jazz Vocal category. In 2013, a Radio 6 Award followed in the category Best Male.

=== Hopscotch and Edison ===
On 29 March 2013, his fourth album was released, titled Hopscotch . This record was recorded at Electric Monkey Studios in Amsterdam and produced by Paul Willemsen (Beans & Fatback), who also played on and co-wrote the album. The other band members on this album are Jesse van Ruller (guitar), Hugo den Oudsten (bass), and Bram Hakkens (drums). The first single from this album is titled Fool By Morning and was released on 5 March 2013. He received the Edison Public Award for this album in 2013 Edisons.

In June 2013, Hein became known to the general public through his musical contribution to the TV program Linda's Zomerweek, in which he performed the favourite songs of Linda's guests. He also participated in the program in 2014, this time together with guitarist Paul Willemsen.

=== FINK and Radio Show ===
In 2014 and 2015, he played as a keyboardist for the English singer-songwriterFink, both on his album Hard Believer and during Fink's European tour. Hein also provided backing vocals. The band played concert halls in large and small cities throughout Europe and also performed at a number of festivals, including Lowlands and the Sziget Festival.

From 2014 to 2015, Ruben Hein had a weekly radio show, "Ruben's Guestlist," on NPO Radio 6.

=== Everything I Say and Groundwork Rising ===
After the period with Fink, Hein started working on a new album. In November 2017, the EP Everything I Say was released as a precursor to the album Groundwork Rising. The title track, Everything I Say, is also the first single from this album, which was named a 'NPO Radio 2 TopSong' on NPO Radio 2 in December 2017. Groundwork Rising was released on 2 February 2018. The album was recorded at Studio 150 in Amsterdam. For the artwork, he worked with photographers and video artists Yani and Jules Bongers. Together with them, six videos were made for the album, of which Everything I Say was the first.

Hein was one of the guest artists during 2017 Symphonica in Rosso at the Ziggo Dome, where Simply Red was the headliner. A few years prior, he had also opened for Simply Red, also at the Ziggo Dome at the time.

=== Wie is de Mol? 2018 ===
In November 2017, it was announced that Hein would participate in the TV programme Wie is de Mol? on AVROTROS. The first episode aired on 6 January 2018, and began in five different cities in five different countries. Hein started in Kazakhstan together with Olcay Gulsen. Ultimately, the season took place in Georgia. In the nine episodes that followed, Hein managed to work his way to the finale and was the only one to unmask that season's mole, Jan Versteegh, making him the season winner.

=== OCEANS and Sounds Of The South ===
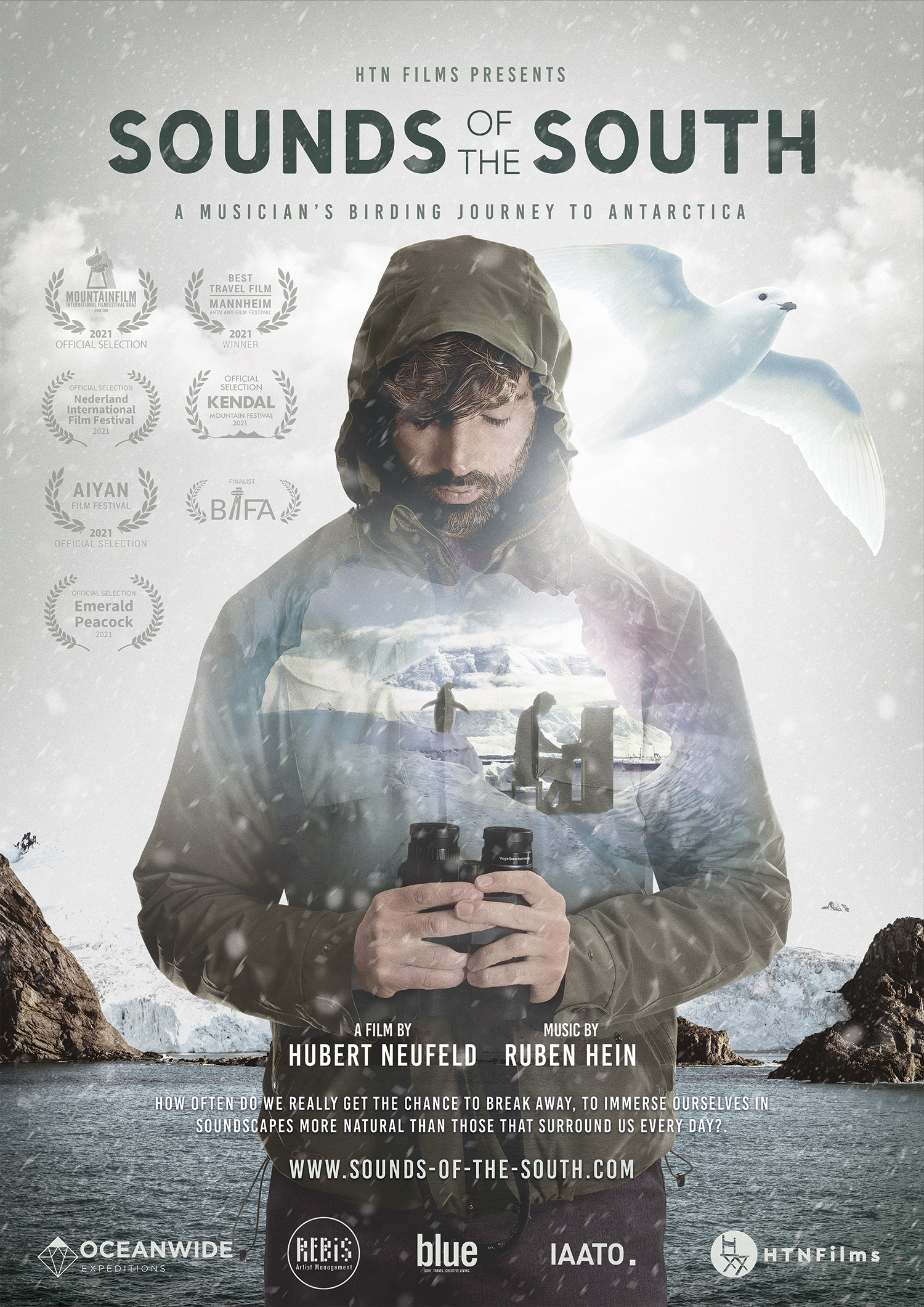
De poster van de documentaire 'Sounds Of The South'.

From February to March 2020, Ruben embarked on a 22-night journey to the Falkland Islands, South Georgia, and the Antarctic Peninsula. These regions are known for their seabird colonies, abundance of marine life, massive glaciers, and rugged coastlines. During this Artist In Residency, he captured the first ideas for his new project in a mini-studio in his cabin on the ship. Ruben went in search of a way to combine his two deeply cherished interests: nature and music.

The documentary Sounds Of The South emerged from this journey in search of inspiration for his next album. Directed by Hubert Neufeld and featuring Ruben's own original music, this documentary attempts to capture some of the magic of his journey to this wondrous other world. The documentary received its first public screening at the Mountainfilm International Film Festival Graz on November 11, 2021. In addition to being screened in Graz, Austria, Sounds Of The South was also shown at film festivals in Toronto (Canada), Colorado (US), London (UK), Amsterdam (Netherlands), Mannheim (Germany), and Chennai (India), among others.

In collaboration with M&N media, the documentary premiered in the Netherlands on 4 April 2022. Subsequently, it became part of the 'Nature On Tour' concept and was screened in various cinemas throughout the Netherlands.

On 25 February 2022, Hein released his seventh album, 'OCEANS'. The album was recorded at Wisseloord Studios in Hilversum with producer Ferdy van der Singel and engineer Matthijs Kievit. For the artwork, he collaborated with photographers and video artists Yani and Paul Postma. The album was inspired by a journey he took aboard the MV Hondius.

=== 2025 ===
He also gained recognition among the general public in August 2025 through his participation on the jury of the television program "Het Max Orkest". In the autumn of 2025, he appeared as the leader of the house band in the talk show about the " Sinterklaasjournaal"; "Speculasies".

== Discography ==
=== Albums ===
Album title	Release date	Charting in the Dutch Album Top 100			Comments
Album title	Release date	Date of entry	Highest	Weeks	Comments
Loose Fit	29-10-2010	06-11-2010	16	14	
Ruben Hein Live	12-10-2011	-			
Revisited	2012	-			
Hopscotch	29-03-2013	06-04-2013	17	11	
A Song For You (ep)	2013				
Dressed Up	2014	30-08-2014	12	3	
Everything I Say (ep)	2017				
Groundwork Rising	2018	10-02-2018	96	1	
OCEANS	25-02-2022	05-03-2022	14	1	
