= A Mili =

Surinamese singer (born 1990)

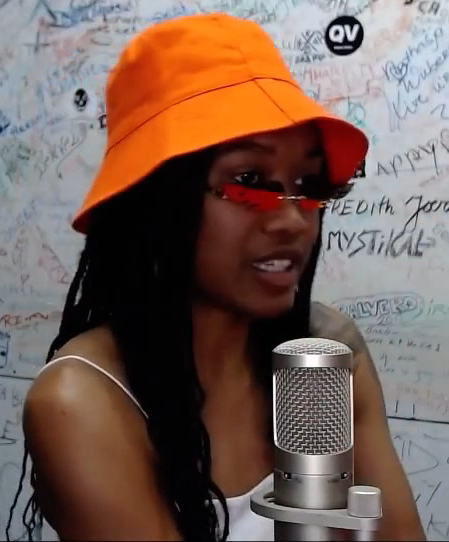
- A Mili in 2022

Background information
- Born: Milaisa Breeveld; 10 July 1990 (age 36); Paramaribo, Suriname
- Genres: Reggae; Soul; Kawina
- Website: amili.nl

Milaisa Breeveld (born 10 July 1990), known professionally as A Mili, is a Surinamese singer. She has had two chart hits in Suriname: "Omin lobi" (2014) and "Blindfolded" (2015). She won the first prize at the Open Podium Twente in 2018; later that year, she also received the Paul Smits Award, a public prize of the Popronde Amsterdam festival. During the Eurovision Song Contest 2021, she performed onstage as part of Jeangu Macrooy's rendition of "Birth of a New Age".

== Early life ==
Milaisa Breeveld was born in Paramaribo on 10 July 1990. Her father Hans Breeveld is a political science professor. Many of her family members are also well-known Surinamese, such as her aunt Lucia (pastor) and uncles Borger (actor and filmmaker), Carl (theologian and politician) and Clarence (singer and guitarist).

Breeveld had begun singing at the age of four, both alone and with her father. She especially liked spirituals and blues. However, when she entered the University of Suriname, she chose to study Business Economics on her father's advice. Music, from his experience, was not the best field for financial stability; he would remind her about "stability, happiness and wisdom".

== Career ==
While in university, Breeveld began performing with various artists. In 2012, she went to the Netherlands with reggae singer Jahsenye (Vernon Delano) and MC Olu Abena through the Artist On The Rise program for a two-week musical exchange. In the Netherlands, she first heard the word "conservatory"; when she told her father about this, he said, "there is one here too". She then decided to follow her heart, interrupting her studies in Business Economics and entering the Conservatory of Suriname to study Voice.

In 2013, together with Enver Panka and Garry Payton, Breeveld wrote and sang the theme song for the elections of the Suriname National Youth Parliament. During this time, she played in a band, made jingles and released two songs that became chart hits: "Omin lobi" (2014) and "Blindfolded" (2015).

During a tour, Breeveld was nicknamed A Mili by dancehall artist Turbulence. In an interview, Breeveld revealed that performing as A Mili helped her to be more herself on stage, rather than being another Breeveld. Henceforth, she would tour under this stage name. She had been called Mili before this as an abbreviation of her first name. As it also means "one thousand" in Sranan, she would say, "When I come, I come like a thousand men."

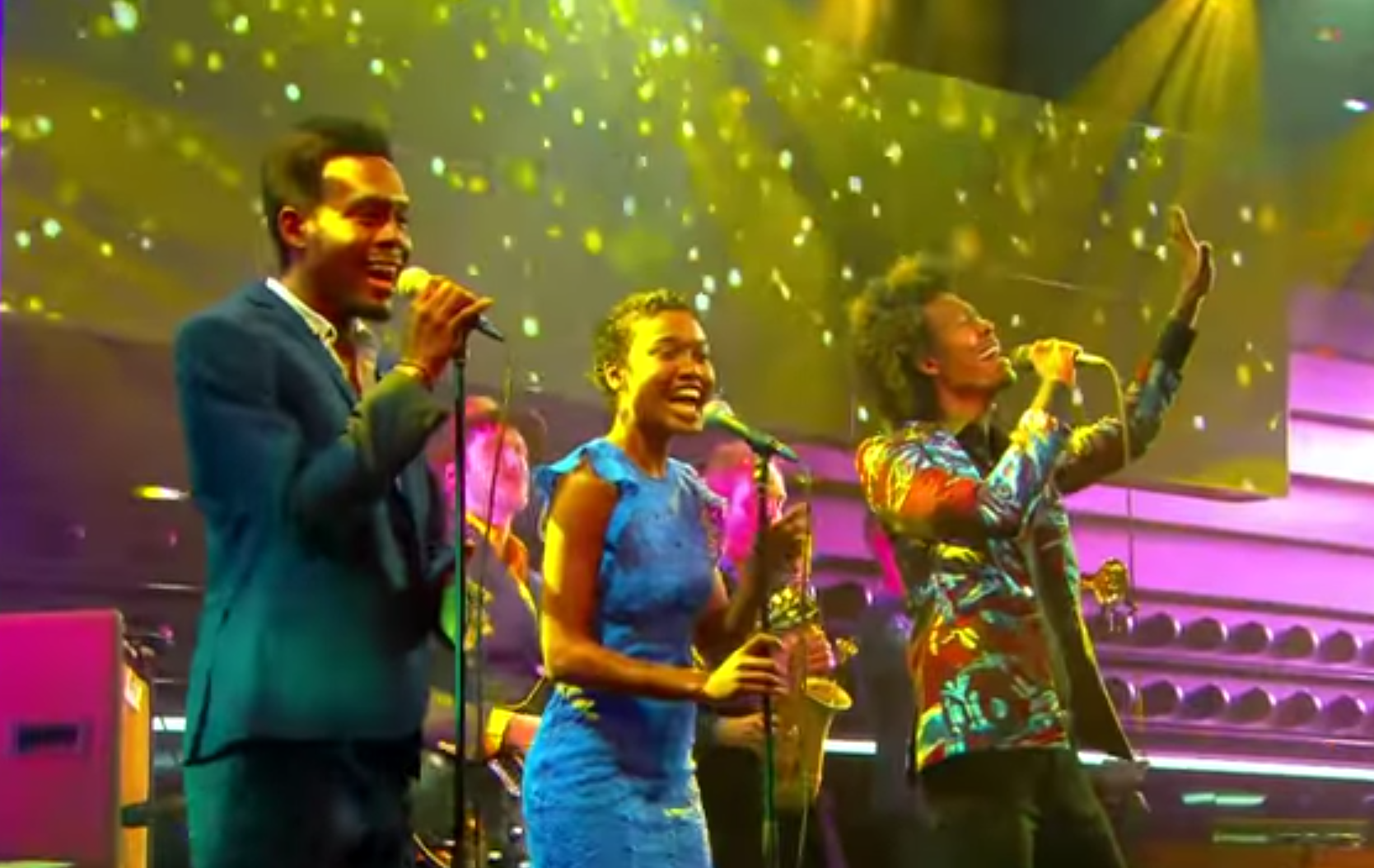
A Mili (center) with the Macrooy twins Xillan (left) and Jeangu (right)

=== Netherlands ===
In mid-2015, Mili decided to move to the Netherlands, and was accepted at the ArtEZ Conservatory (Popacademie) in Enschede. In 2016 she won third place at the Open Podium Twente; she participated again in May 2018, winning first prize this time. In the same year, she also performed in front of a full house at the Booster Festival, a major festival in the Eastern Netherlands. In November 2018, she won the Popronde audience award, the Paul Smits Award, at the Melkweg in Amsterdam. She released her first single in the Netherlands, titled "Alone", in early 2019; she released her second single, "Kom eraan" (with Mr. Weazley), in August 2019.

While in Enschede, Mili met Jeangu Macrooy, who had moved from Suriname around the same time. They have collaborated musically; in addition, Mili and Jeangu's twin brother Xillan Macrooy have been background singers on Jeangu's songs. In 2021, the three of them, along with dancer Gil The Grid, was part of Jeangu's onstage performance for the Eurovision Song Contest 2021 in Ahoy Rotterdam. They performed the song "Birth of a New Age" in the final on 22 May.
