= Perquisite (musician) =

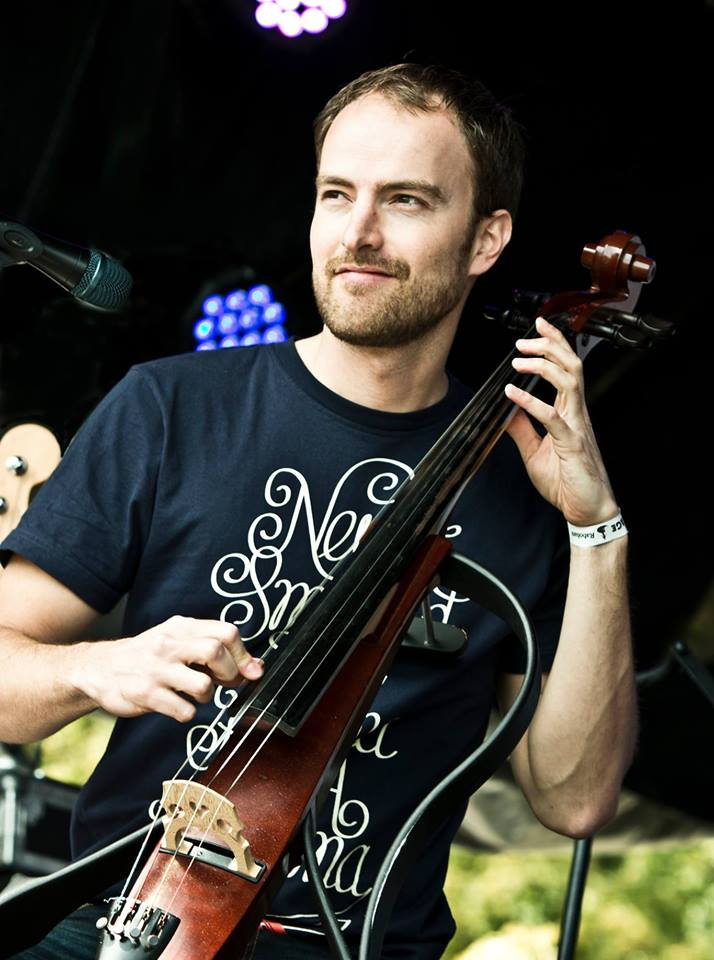

Background information
- Born: Pieter Perquin; 13 April 1982 (age 44); Amsterdam, The Netherlands
- Occupations: Composer, music producer, musician
- Instruments: cello, keys, bass, samples
- Years active: 1996–present
- Label: Unexpected Records
- Website: http://www.perquisite.nl

Pieter Perquin (born 13 April 1982, Amsterdam, Netherlands), better known under the pseudonym Perquisite, is a Dutch musician, music producer and composer.

== Biography ==
In 1996, at the age of 14, Perquisite started making hip-hop beats. Due to his classical musical background he often incorporated classical and jazzy elements into his creations. In 2001 he started his own record label Unexpected Records and made his debut with the Outta Nowhere EP, in collaboration with Dutch jazz saxophonist Benjamin Herman. After this, he composed and produced another solo EP, Double Vision, which was released in 2002.

In 2003 Perquisite started collaborating with Dutch rapper/MC Pete Philly, and together they had their breakthrough as the hip-hop duo Pete Philly & Perquisite. They released two studio-albums, 'Mindstate' and 'Mystery Repeats' and toured around the world with their live band for five years straight. They played multiple festivals, including Lowlands, North Sea Jazz and Sziget. Their studio album 'Mindstate' (2005) received a lot of critical acclaim, Talib Kweli stating; 'Musically, these guys are light years ahead of the game.'. Studio album 'Mystery Repeats' (2007) came in second position in the Dutch album charts to stay there for 25 weeks. Together Pete & Perq won multiple prizes, including the Dutch 'Silver Harp', and the 'Amsterdam Prize for the Arts'. After more than 300 performances in and outside of the Netherlands, including providing the support act for James Brown and Kanye West, the duo ended their collaboration in the autumn of 2009 with a last 'Final Celebration Tour'.

In 2009 Perquisite won a Golden Calf (Dutch: Gouden Kalf), (which is the award of the Netherlands Film Festival) for composing the music for the film 'Carmen van het Noorden'. After this, Perquisite composed the music for several Dutch feature films, amongst them 'Hartenstraat' (2014), 'Brasserie Valentijn' (2016), 'Huisvrouwen Bestaan Niet' (2017) and 'Niemand In De Stad' (2018). For the latter he received another Gouden Kalf nomination.

Right after his first film music assignment, Perquisite started working on his solo album 'Across', that saw its release in October 2010. On 'Across' Perquisite collaborated with twelve different Dutch vocalists, among them Torre Florim (De Staat), Cato van Dijck (My Baby) and Janne Schra.

In 2012 Perquisite met singer Kris Berry at a weekly jam session in Amsterdam. They started writing songs together and decided to release an album. Joint effort 'Lovestruck Puzzles' was released in September 2013 via Unexpected Records.

Late 2015 Perquisite was invited to function as a judge for performances by students at the Conservatory in Enschede. There he first met Jeangu Macrooy, with whom a musical collaboration kicked off. Jeangu was signed to Unexpected Records and his debut EP 'Brave Enough', produced by Perquisite, was released in April 2016. The next year debut album 'High On You' was released, which was nominated for the Edison Pop in the category 'Best Album', followed by Jeangu's second album 'Horizon'. Both were produced and co-written by Perquisite. Besides this, both Dutch submissions for the Eurovision Song Contest 2020 and Eurovision Song Contest 2021, Jeangu Macrooy's 'Grow' and 'Birth Of A New Age', were produced by Perquisite. The Eurovision Song Contest 2020 was cancelled due to Covid-19; the reason why Jeangu Macrrooy participated twice. 'Birth Of A New Age' was written and produced by Jeangu Macrooy and Perquisite and was picked up by The New York Times.

In 2022, Perquisite started collaborating with upcoming Alternative R&B singer/songwriter Swan. Her debut-album 'Underneath My Façade', which was composed by Perquisite and Swan, was presented at the Melkweg in Amsterdam on March 8, 2025. In addition, a joint single featuring GINGE was released in April 2025.

In 2023, Pete Philly & Perquisite decided to collaborate once again. This led to a major reunion concert at AFAS Live in Amsterdam on November 17, 2023, which was followed by the release of their third studioalbum 'Eon' on May 3rd, 2024. After a successful European Tour that year, which included performances in London, Berlin, and Paris, the duo announced a new tour for 2025: the Time Flies Theater Tour. For this tour, Pete Philly & Perquisite performed in eleven Dutch theaters between April and June 2025.

Besides his career as an artist/producer/composer, Perquisite has been running his own record label Unexpected Records since 2001. He has also been responsible for the management of Pete Philly & Perquisite and Kris Berry & Perquisite and is currently managing Jeangu Macrooy. Also, he was a member of the board of Dutch copyright organisation BUMA/STEMRA from 2013 until 2018. In 2015 Perquisite and a number of other musicians (including Tjeerd Bomhof, Torre Florim and Arriën Molema) established BAM!, the Dutch Songwriters Society, for which he became the first chairman, from 2015 until 2020.

Music composed and produced by Perquisite has accumulated over 100 million streams on Spotify.

== Discography ==
Also check out Discography Pete Philly & Perquisite.

=== Albums ===
- "Underneath My Façade", by Swan (2025) (produced/co-written by Perquisite)
- "Eon" (2024), as Pete Philly & Perquisite
- "Ik Wist Het: Original Motion Picture Score" (2022)
- "Horizon" (2019), by Jeangu Macrooy (produced/co-written by Perquisite)
- "Niemand In De Stad: Original Motion Picture Score" (2018)
- "High On You" (2017), by Jeangu Macrooy (produced/co-written by Perquisite)
- "Collected Works" (2015), as Perquisite & Sliderinc
- "Lovestruck Puzzles" (2013), as Kris Berry & Perquisite
- "Across" (2010)
- "Carmen van het Noorden: De Soundtrack" (2009)
- "Mystery Repeats: The Live Edition" (2008), as Pete Philly & Perquisite
- "Mystery Repeats" (2007), as Pete Philly & Perquisite
- "Remindstate" (2007), as Pete Philly & Perquisite
- "Mindstate" (2005), as Pete Philly & Perquisite

=== EPs ===
- "My Stereo (Fluid Funk Remixes) (2024), as Pete Philly & Perquisite
- "Underneath My Façade EP" (2024), by Swan (produced/arranged by Perquisite)
- "Brave Enough" (2016), by Jeangu Macrooy (produced/arranged by Perquisite)
- "Lotus" (2011), with Renske Taminiau, soundtrack Lotus (film)
- "Expressions" (2003), as North West Metropolis
- "Double Vision" (2002), with David Kweksilber
- "Outta Nowhere" (2001), with Benjamin Herman

=== Singles ===
- "Get A Grip" (2025), by Swan & GINGE
- "The Outcome" (2024), by Swan
- "Sidepiece" (2024), by Swan
- "My Stereo" (2024), as Pete Philly & Perquisite
- "Mayhem feat. Naaz" (2024), as Pete Philly & Perquisite
- "Wish You Well" (2023), by Swan
- "No Drama" (2023), by Swan
- "Hot Sauce" (2023), as Pete Philly & Perquisite
- "Time Flies (2023 remaster), as Pete Philly & Perquisite
- "Yin Yang" (2023), by Swan
- "Birth Of A New Age" (2021), by Jeangu Macrooy (produced by Perquisite)
- "Grow" (2020), by Jeangu Macrooy (produced by Perquisite)
- "Second Hand Lover" (2019), by Jeangu Macrooy (produced by Perquisite)
- "Shake Up This Place" (2019), by Jeangu Macrooy (produced/co-written by Perquisite)
- "Dance With Me" (2018), by Jeangu Macrooy (produced/co-written by Perquisite)
- "How Much I Love You" (2018), by Jeangu Macrooy (produced/co-written by Perquisite)
- "Tell Me Father" (2017), by Jeangu Macrooy (produced/co-written by Perquisite)
- "High On You" (2017), by Jeangu Macrooy (produced/co-written by Perquisite)
- "Crazy Kids" (2017), by Jeangu Macrooy (produced/co-written by Perquisite)
- "Step Into The Water" (2017), by Jeangu Macrooy (produced/co-written by Perquisite)
- "Brave Enough" (2016), by Jeangu Macrooy (produced/co-written by Perquisite)
- "To Love Is To Hurt" (2016), by Jeangu Macrooy (produced/co-written by Perquisite)
- "Gold" (2016), by Jeangu Macrooy (produced/co-written by Perquisite)
- "Birds On Branches" (2014), as Kris Berry & Perquisite
- "Warm" (2014), as Kris Berry & Perquisite
- "Let Go" (2013), as Kris Berry & Perquisite
- "Hitchhike" (2013), as Kris Berry & Perquisite
- "Blackbirds" (2011), feat. GMB
- "Dreams Of Gold" (2010), feat. Jenny Lane
- "Set Me Free" (2010), feat. Urita & Sanguita
- "Q&A" (2008), as Pete Philly & Perquisite
- "Mystery Repeats" (2008), as Pete Philly & Perquisite
- "Empire" (2008), as Pete Philly & Perquisite
- "Time Flies" (2007), as Pete Philly & Perquisite
- "Mellow" (2006), as Pete Philly & Perquisite
- "Grateful/Amazed" (2005), as Pete Philly & Perquisite
- "Hope/Cocksure" (2005), as Pete Philly & Perquisite
- "Insomnia" (2005), as Pete Philly & Perquisite

=== Other productions ===
- Executive production album "Volatile" - Josephine Odhil (Unexpected Records, 2023)
- Executive production + string arrangements album "Summer Moon" - Jeangu Macrooy (Unexpected Records, 2022)
- Production "Only You" - TenTemPiés (Patiperro, 2018)
- Production "Street of Hearts" - Niels Geusebroek (Cats Don't Swim, 2014)
- Production "Nieuwe Belofte" - De Gebroeders Fretz (Universal Music, 2012)
- String arrangements and cello "Motorbike" & "Unbearable Lightness Of Love" - Dazzled Kid (Fire Needs Air, Universal Music, 2011)
- String arrangements and cello "Indian Hay" & "Sunday Blossom" - Benjamin Herman (Blue Sky Blond, Roach Records / Dox Records, 2009)
- Production "Lyrical Love" - Renske Taminiau (Waiting To Be Told, Unconventional Records / Challenge Records, 2008)
- Production/composition "Second Blow" - Voicst (A Tale Of Two Devils, Good Busy/PIAS, 2008)
- Cello on "Mindstate" - New Generation Big Band (Had Je Wat? 2007)
- Production/composition "Nothing To Play With" - Perquisite (Project Mooncircle, Luna Orbit, 2005)
- String arrangements "Schouderklopje" - Terilekst (online, 2005)
- Production/composition "Nebula" - The Proov (Nebula, Unexpected Records, 2003)
- Co-production/composition "Indy & Wich, MOD, Shogun & The Proov – Flockwork" (From Amsterdam to Praha, Redrum, 2003)

== Filmography ==
=== Film music ===
- "Snor" (Zainab Goelaman, 2023)
- "Ik wist het" (Jamel Aattache, 2022), with Sliderinc
- "Buiten Is Het Feest" (Jelle Nesna, 2020)
- "Huisvrouwen Bestaan Niet 2" (Anniëlle Webster, 2019), with Sliderinc
- "Niemand In De Stad" (Michiel van Erp, 2018)
- "Huisvrouwen Bestaan Niet" (Anniëlle Webster, 2017), with Sliderinc
- "Hartenstrijd" (Janice Pierre, 2016), with Sliderinc
- "Brasserie Valentijn" (Sanne Vogel, 2016), with Sliderinc
- "Wiplala" (Tim Oliehoek, 2014), only the songs (with Ruben Hein and Alain Clark)
- "Hartenstraat" (Sanne Vogel, 2014), with Sliderinc
- "Kort" (Sanne Vogel, 2013)
- "Cabo" (Ivan Barbosa, 2012)
- "De Rekening van Catelijne" (Sarah Sylbing & Ester Gould, 2012)
- "Lotus" (Pascale Simons, 2011), with Sliderinc
- "Klein" (Sanne Vogel, 2011)
- "Lellebelle" (Mischa Kamp, 2009)
- "Carmen van het Noorden" (Jelle Nesna, 2009)

=== TV productions ===
- "Zina" (Michael Middelkoop, 2021)
- "Van God Los": episode 'Dead Man's Hand' (Steffen Haars, 2013), with Sliderinc
- "Het Snelle Geld" (Ijsbrand van Veelen, 2012)
- "Erop of Eronder" (Michiel van Erp, 2011)
- "Mama" (Sanne Vogel, 2010)
