= Jeangu Macrooy =

Surinamese singer-songwriter

- Jeangu Macrooy during his 'Young, Awkward & Lonely' Theater Tour in 2025.

Background information
- Born: 6 November 1993 (age 32); Paramaribo, Suriname
- Genres: Pop, soul, alternative
- Occupations: Musician, singer, composer, actor
- Years active: 2011–present
- Label: Unexpected Records
- Website: www.jeangumacrooy.com

Jeangu Macrooy (Dutch pronunciation: [ʑɑ̃ːˈɡy maːˈkroːi]; born 6 November 1993) is a Surinamese and Dutch singer-songwriter and actor. He was born in Paramaribo and has been living in the Netherlands since 2014. Macrooy's music is described as modern soul. His audience is mainly based in the Netherlands, Suriname, and increasingly in Belgium, France and Germany. He was due to represent host nation the Netherlands in the Eurovision Song Contest 2020 in Rotterdam with the song "Grow", but the contest was cancelled because of the COVID-19 pandemic. Instead, he represented the country in the 2021 contest with "Birth of a New Age".

== Career ==
=== Early career ===
In 2011, together with his twin brother Xillan, Macrooy formed the band Between Towers. Their first and only album, Stars on My Radio came out in 2013. After having studied at the Conservatory of Suriname in Paramaribo for two years, he moved to the Netherlands in 2014 to study songwriting at the ArtEZ Conservatory in Enschede.

=== 2015–2019: Album releases and tours ===
During a performance at the conservatory, Macrooy met music producer Perquisite and signed with his record label Unexpected Records shortly after in December 2015. Macrooy's debut EP Brave Enough, produced by Perquisite, appeared in April 2016, and his first single "Gold" was used in an advertisement for HBO. A year later, in April 2017, Macrooy released his first solo album, High on You which was co-written and produced by Perquisite. The album peaked at number 69 on the Dutch Albums Chart.

Both releases were followed by club tours in the Netherlands and performances as a supporting act at concerts abroad. He was the opening act for Curtis Harding and Ayo in Germany, and for Trombone Shorty in Belgium, France and Germany. He has also performed at some of the major music festivals of the Netherlands, including the North Sea Jazz Festival and Lowlands. In December 2017, Macrooy returned to Suriname for his first concert with his band in Paramaribo. His single "Dance with Me" was used as the theme song of the Dutch drama film Open Seas, which premiered in 2018.

Macrooy's second album, titled Horizon, which was also produced by Perquisite, was released in February 2019. In the summer of 2019, he went on his first own headliner tour to three major cities in Germany: Cologne, Hamburg and Berlin. He also played at the internationally renowned Reeperbahn Festival in Hamburg.

His song "High on You" has gained great success in Suriname topping the Nationale Top 40 Suriname.

=== 2020–2022: Eurovision Song Contest and "Summer Moon" ===
On 10 January 2020 it was announced that Macrooy would represent the Netherlands in the Eurovision Song Contest 2020 in Rotterdam. After the show's cancellation due to the COVID-19 pandemic, it was announced that he would represent the country once again in the Eurovision Song Contest 2021. Jeangu is the third Dutch Eurovision act with Surinamese origins, as Humphrey Campbell (Eurovision Song Contest 1992) and Ruth Jacott (Eurovision Song Contest 1993) were also both born in Suriname before moving to the Netherlands.

On 4 March 2021 Macrooy's entry, entitled "Birth of a New Age", was released. The song was the first ever Eurovision entry to feature lyrics in Sranan Tongo. As Netherlands was the host country of the 2021 contest, Jeangu was automatically qualified for the final, where he placed 23rd out of 26 participants, receiving 11 points, all of which were awarded by the juries while he received none from the televote.

On 11 November 2022 Macrooy released his third studio album, "Summer Moon", which he made together with producer Bud Kolk. He drew the album artwork of the album himself, just like he did with the covers of 'Brave Enough' and 'High On You'. In terms of sound, Jeangu partly returned to the soulful sound of his debut album, but Summer Moon also has electronic and disco influences. The album was nominated for the Edison Pop Awards in the category Best Soul/R&B/Funk album. In March 2023, Jeangu released Space. The single was named TopSong by NPO Radio 2, the fourth in his career to date. Later that year he and his band launched the Summer Moon tour.

=== 2022–2025: "Jesus Christ Superstar", "Young, Awkward & Lonely" and "Hadestown". ===
At the end of 2023, it was announced that Jeangu was playing the role of Jesus in the rock musical Jesus Christ Superstar by Andrew Lloyd Webber and Tim Rice, directed by Ivo van Hove. The theater spectacle ran from January 2024 to November 2024 and received rave 5-star reviews in all Dutch newspapers. Jeangu was also nominated for Best Performance by a Lead Actor in a Major Musical at the 2024 Musical Awards.

In the summer of 2025, Jeangu took on the role of Orpheus in the musical Hadestown in the Royal theater Carré in Amsterdam, once again achieving a successful performance that was unanimously embraced by both audiences and press.

Following the release of his single "Independent Girls & Nasty Evil Gays", a satirical queer protest song that was named TopSong on NPO Radio 2, Jeangu's fourth studio album "Young, Awkward & Lonely" was released on October 10, 2025. On this album, Jeangu reflects on his youth, the awkwardness of life, and the longing for connection. The album was produced by Jasper Zuidervaart (known for his work with Chef'Special) and was followed by a theatre tour of the same name, in which Jeangu was accompanied by his band and three vocalists from the ZO! Gospel Choir.

=== 2026–Present: "Beste Zangers" and "Zolang Ik Blijf Dansen" ===
In 2026 Jeangu featured in the nineteenth season of Beste Zangers. During his participation, Jeangu discovered the Dutch language as a new form of expressing himself musically. This experience formed the inspiration for his first ever full Dutch-language album 'Zolang Ik Blijf Dansen', which is planned for release in the spring of 2027. On October 23rd, the first single of this album, "Vloed", was released.

== Television appearances ==
=== De Wereld Draait Door ===
Macrooy talking about the documentary George Michael: Freedom on De Wereld Draait Door

Macrooy has been a regular guest on the Dutch talkshow De Wereld Draait Door (DWDD). Besides performing his own music, he has paid tributes to other artists including Stevie Wonder, George Michael, and the Blue Diamonds. He also performed Bob Dylan's "The Times They Are a-Changin'" in a special retrospective broadcast of the show. Throughout the show's 2018–2019 season, Macrooy sang, alongside Ruben Hein, several songs by Paul Simon and Elton John, who had announced their farewell tours earlier in 2018.

=== The Passion ===
On 28 March 2018, Macrooy was part of the Dutch national TV production The Passion, in which he took on the role of Judas, alongside Tommie Christiaan (Jesus), Brainpower (Saint Peter), Glennis Grace (Mary), and Arjan Ederveen (Pontius Pilate). The broadcast, which took place in Amsterdam-Zuidoost that year, attracted 3.5 million viewers.

=== De Nationale 2021 Test ===
On 30 December 2021, Macrooy was a guest on NPO's De Nationale 2021 Test along with Lisa Loeb, Edson da Graça, Lale Gül, Lucille Werner, Jetze Plat, and Marcel van Roosmalen. Due to the COVID-19 pandemic, the show was filmed with a virtual audience.

=== Even Tot Hier ===
On 29 April 2023, Macrooy performed a song in the television show Even tot hier. He sung a parody on his song "Birth Of A New Age". The parody was about Olga Commandeur leaving television after 23 years.

In April 2023, he also appeared in an episode of the television game show Alles is Muziek.

=== Beste Zangers ===
In 2026, Jeangu participated in the nineteenth season of Beste Zangers, a popular Dutch television program by AVROTROS together with Yves Berendse, Clouseau, Bizzey, Desray, Fay Claassen, and Zoë Livay. During this program Jeangu sang covers of "Daar Gaat Hij" (by Clouseau), "Terug In De Tijd" (by Yves Berendse), "This Woman's Work" (by Kate Bush), and "Iemand Anders" (by Zoë Livay). Furthermore, he sang several duets, including "Sinds 1 Dag Of 2" (by Doe Maar) together with Zoë Livay, and "Easy Lover" (by Philip Baily and Phil Collins) together with Clouseau.

== Personal life ==
Macrooy has a sister and a twin brother, Xillan Macrooy, who is a singer and writer and used to be one of the backing vocalists in Jeangu Macrooy's live band. The two have also collaborated on the songs "Crazy Kids" from Jeangu Macrooy's debut album "High On You" and on "Second Hand Lover" from Macrooy's sophomore album Horizon.

Jeangu has spoken about the importance of being an openly gay role model for young Surinamese people, a country where queerness is often still considered a taboo subject.

== Discography ==
=== Studio albums ===
Title	Details	Peak chart positions
Title	Details	NL
High on You	Released: 14 April 2017; Label: Unexpected Records; Formats: Digital download, CD, Vinyl	69
Horizon	Released: 8 February 2019; Label: Unexpected Records; Formats: Digital download, CD	—
Summer Moon	Released: 11 November 2022; Label: Unexpected Records; Formats: Digital download, CD, cassette	—
Young, Awkward & Lonely	Released: 10 October 2025; Label: Unexpected Records; Formats: Digital download, CD, cassette	—
"—" denotes a recording that did not chart or was not released in that territory.

=== Live albums ===
Title	Details
Live!	Released: 6 November 2019; Label: Unexpected Records; Formats: Digital download, CD

=== Extended plays ===
Title	Details
Brave Enough	Released: 7 April 2016; Label: Unexpected Records; Formats: Digital download, CD

=== Other albums ===
- Stars on My Radio (2013) (album credited to Between Towers)

=== Singles ===
List of singles as lead artist, with selected chart positions and certifications, showing year released and album name
Title	Year	Peak chart positions					Album
Title	Year	SUR	NL Single Top 100	NL Dutch Top 40	BEL (FL)	LIT	Album
"Gold"	2016	—	—	—	—	*	Brave Enough
"To Love Is to Hurt"	2016	—	—	—	—	*	Brave Enough
"Brave Enough"	2016	—	—	—	—	*	Brave Enough
"Step Into the Water"	2017	—	—	—	—	*	High On You
"Crazy Kids" (featuring Xillan)	2017	—	—	—	—	*	High On You
"High On You"	2017	1	—	—	—	*	High On You
"Tell Me Father"	2017	—	—	—	—	*	High On You
"How Much I Love You"	2018	—	—	—	—	*	Horizon
"Dance with Me"	2018	—	—	—	—	—	Horizon
"Shake Up This Place"	2019	—	—	—	—	—	Horizon
"Second Hand Lover"	2019	—	—	—	—	—	Horizon
"Grow"	2020	—	48	29	— (Note: "Grow" was a 'tip' in the Ultratip Bubbling Under.)	—	Non-album singles
"Birth of a New Age"	2021	—	30	37	90	94	Non-album singles
"A Little Greener"	2021	—	—	—	—	—	Summer Moon
"Worship"	2022	—	—	—	—	—	Summer Moon
"Admit It"	2022	—	—	—	—	—	Summer Moon
"Paris"	2022	—	—	—	—	—	Summer Moon
"Space"	2023	32	—	—	—	—	Summer Moon
"Young, Awkward & Lonely"	2024	—	—	—	—	—	Young, Awkward & Lonely
"Happier"	2024	—	—	—	—	—	Young, Awkward & Lonely
"I Found Someone"	2024	—	—	—	—	—	Young, Awkward & Lonely
"Everybody Needs Somebody"	2025	—	—	—	—	—	Young, Awkward & Lonely
"Independent Girls & Nasty Evil Gays"	2025	—	—	—	—	—	Young, Awkward & Lonely
"Something Better"	2025	—	—	—	—	—	Young, Awkward & Lonely
"Vloed"	2026	—	—	—	—	—	Zolang Ik Blijf Dansen
"—" denotes items which were not released in that country or failed to chart. "*" denotes the chart did not exist at that time.

== Awards and nominations ==
Year	Award	Category	Result
2017	Edison Awards	Best Newcomer	Nominated
2018	Edison Awards	Best Album (High On You)	Nominated
2024	Edison Awards	Best Soul/R&B/Funk Album (Summer Moon)	Nominated

== Notes ==
Awards and achievements
Preceded by Duncan Laurence with "Arcade"	Netherlands in the Eurovision Song Contest; 2020 (cancelled)	Succeeded by Himself with "Birth of a New Age"
Preceded by Himself with "Grow"	Netherlands in the Eurovision Song Contest; 2021	Succeeded by S10 with "De diepte"
