= Half-cent coin (Netherlands) =

Dutch coin used from 1818 to 1940

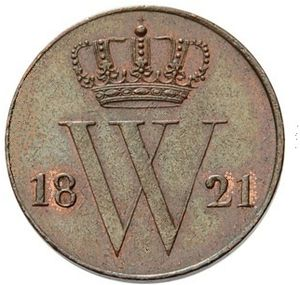
Dutch half-cent coin (Halfje) from 1821

The half-cent coin was a Dutch coin used from 1818 to 1940. It was the smallest-denomination coin of the decimal Dutch guilder until its withdrawal from circulation after the German occupation of the Netherlands in 1940. It was nicknamed "Halfje", similar to the Kwartje (the suffix -je is a diminutive in the Dutch language, similar to the English -ie).

The coin was worth 1/2 cent or 1/200 of a Dutch guilder and its first version was minted until 1877. The second version was used until 1940. A half-cent was not used in the coinage during the German occupation and was not reinstated after the liberation of the Netherlands.

== Dimensions and weight ==
Dimensions	1/2 cent 1818–1877	1/2 cent 1878–1940	Refs
Gram	1.92 gram(1817-1837); 1.9 gram(1841-1847); 1.92 gram(1850-1877)	1.25 gram	
Diameter	16 mm	14 mm	
Thickness	1 mm (1841-1847)	1.24 mm(1878-1901); 1.22 mm(1909-1940)	
Metal	Copper	Bronze	

== Versions ==
Monarch	Mint	Material	Obverse	Reverse	Edge	Minting years	Refs
William I	Utrecht and Brussels	Copper	Crowned W between the mint year	Crowned Dutch coat of arms between value	Smooth with no edge lettering	1818(U); 1819(U); 1821(U and B); 1822(U and B); 1823(B); 1824(U and B); 1826-1828(U and B); 1829(U); 1831-1833(U); 1837(U)	
William II	Utrecht	Copper	Crowned W between the mint year	Crowned Dutch coat of arms between value	Smooth with no edge lettering	1841, 1843, 1846, 1847	
William III	Utrecht	Copper	Crowned W between the mint year	Crowned Dutch coat of arms between value	Smooth with no edge lettering	1850–1855, 1857, 1859, 1861–1865, 1867, 1869, 1870, 1872, 1873, 1875–1877	
William III	Utrecht	Bronze	Crowned lion with sword and quiver	Value between two bonded orange branches	Reeded with no edge lettering	1878, 1883–1886	
Wilhelmina	Utrecht	Bronze	Crowned lion with sword and quiver	Value between two bonded orange branches	Reeded with no edge lettering	1891, 1894, 1898, 1900, 1901	
Wilhelmina	Utrecht	Bronze	Crowned lion with sword and quiver (smaller lettering, mint and mint master mark)	Value between two bonded orange branches	Reeded with no edge lettering	1903, 1906	
Wilhelmina	Utrecht	Bronze	Crowned lion with sword and quiver (different crown and bigger lettering)	Value between two bonded orange branches (different orange branches and bigger lettering)	Reeded with no edge lettering	1909, 1911, 1912, 1914–1917, 1921, 1922, 1928, 1930, 1934, 1936–1938, 1940	
