= Lale Gül =

Dutch writer of Turkish descent (born 1997)

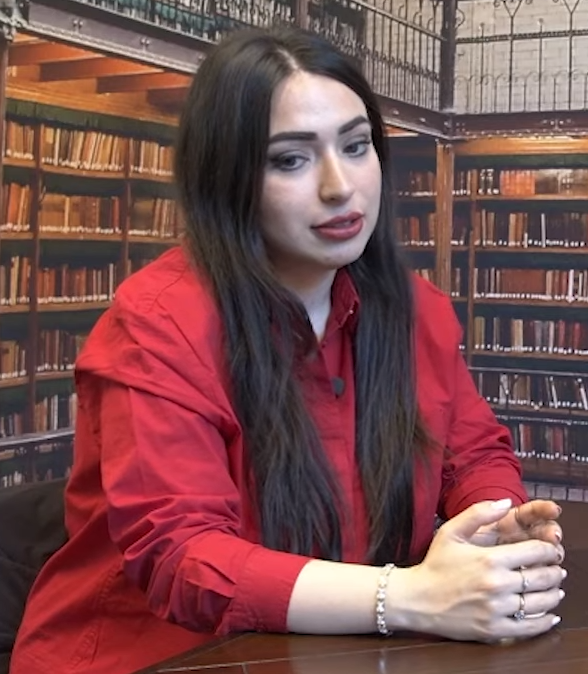
- Born: 3 November 1997 (age 28); Amsterdam
- Education: Vrije Universiteit
- Writing career
- Language: Dutch
- Notable work: Ik ga leven (2021)

Lale Gül (Dutch: [ˈlaːlə gʏl], Turkish: [ˈɫaɫe ɟyl]; Amsterdam, 3 November, 1997) is a Dutch writer of Turkish descent.

Gül was raised in a strict Islamic-religious family in Amsterdam-West. During the week she would attend regular school, and during the weekend she would visit an Islamic school in the Milli Görüş community. She studies Dutch literature at the Vrije Universiteit in Amsterdam.

In 2021 she published and gained national attention with her autobiographical debut novel Ik ga leven (English: I'm going to live) in which she critically and humorously distances herself from her strict religious upbringing.

After publication, she was threatened by people from the Dutch-Islamic community. Also within her own family, the book was not well received. Although she initially indicated to remain living at her parental home, she decided shortly after that this was no longer an option.

She was awarded the NS Publieksprijs for the novel in November 2021.
