= Mindstate (Pete Philly and Perquisite album) =

Studio album by Pete Philly and Perquisite
- Released: 18 April 2005
- Genre: Hip-hop, jazz, breakbeat, soul
- Length: 69:26
- Label: ANTI-
- Producer: Pete Philly & Perquisite

Pete Philly and Perquisite chronology
Mindstate (2005)	Remindstate (2007)

Professional ratings
Review scores
Source	Rating
Allmusic	link
Rapreviews.com	link

Mindstate is the debut album by Dutch hip hop duo Pete Philly and Perquisite released in early 2005. It was critically acclaimed and received a Zilveren Harp in 2006. Also in 2006, Mindstate was released in the United States, Canada and Australia.

In some of the instrumental parts of the album, Jesse van Ruller is featured on guitar. Talib Kweli is also featured, on the track Hope. His comment on their work is that "They're musically light years ahead of the game."

== Track listing ==
1. "Intro" – 0:53
2. "Relieved" – 2:45
3. "Insomnia" – 3:10
4. "Motivated" – 4:36
5. "Eager" – 4:07
6. "Lazy" – 3:38
7. "Respect" – 3:24
8. "Cocksure" – 2:52
9. "Conflicted" – 1:50
10. "Grateful" – 3:53
11. "Mindstate" – 5:56
12. "Mellow" (featuring Senna Gourdou) – 6:28
13. "Paranoid" – 5:16
14. "Cheeky" (featuring Cee Major) – 4:52
15. "Grateful II" – 1:34
16. "Hope" (featuring Talib Kweli) – 4:32
17. "Amazed" – 9:40

== Chart ==
Chart (2005)	Peak position
Dutch Albums (Album Top 100)	52
