= Sander Lantinga =

Dutch radio personality

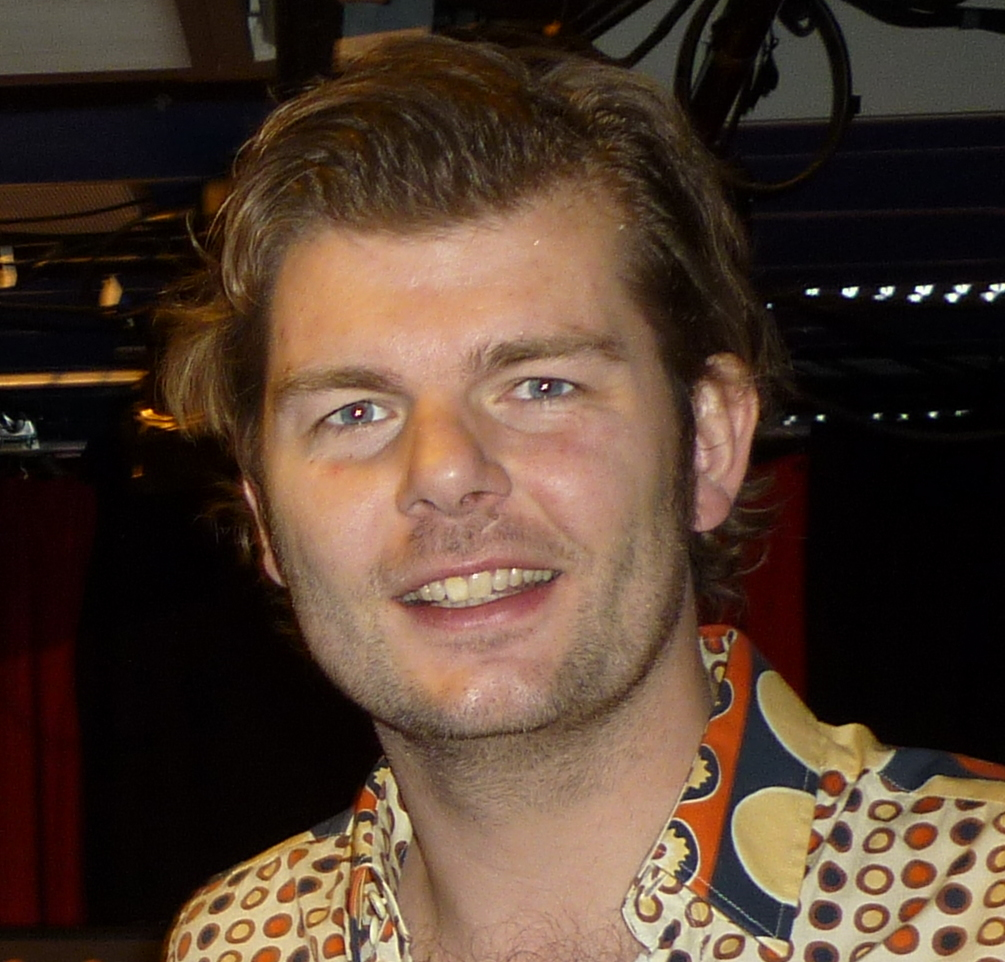
Sander Lantinga

Sander Lantinga (born 27 September 1976) is a Dutch program maker at BNN, and a radio-DJ at radio station 3FM from 2006 till 2015, in August 2015 he is one of the co host of the Coen en Sander Show on Radio 538. Lantinga drew worldwide attention as the streaker during the quarter final tennis match between Maria Sharapova and Elena Dementieva at Wimbledon in July 2006, a challenge he did for the BNN program Try Before You Die.

He was one of the Dutch commentators alongside Cornald Maas for the Eurovision Song Contest 2021, held in Rotterdam, since usual co-commentator Jan Smit was one of the main hosts for that edition. Maas, Lantinga and Smit were all named members of the committee in charge of selecting the Dutch entry to the Eurovision Song Contest 2022. He continued to hold this position for the 2023 and 2024 selections.
