= Open Seas =

2018 film

- Theatrical release poster
- Directed by: Michiel van Erp
- Starring: Julia Akkermans
- Distributed by: September Film
- Release dates: 27 September 2018 (Netherlands FF); 4 October 2018 (Netherlands)
- Running time: 87 minutes
- Country: Netherlands
- Language: Dutch
- Box office: $325,365

Open Seas (Dutch: Niemand in de stad) is a 2018 Dutch drama film directed by Michiel van Erp. It was based on the book of the same name by Philip Huff. In July 2019, it was shortlisted as one of the nine films in contention to be the Dutch entry for the Academy Award for Best International Feature Film at the 92nd Academy Awards, but it was not selected.

== Cast ==
- Julia Akkermans as Elisabeth de Vries
- Anneke Blok as Moeder Philip
- Jacqueline Blom as Moeder Elisabeth
