= Mystery Repeats =

Studio album by Pete Philly and Perquisite
- Released: 7 September 2007
- Genre: Hip hop
- Label: ANTI-
- Producer: Pete Philly & Perquisite

Pete Philly and Perquisite chronology
| Remindstate (2006) | Mystery Repeats (2007) | One (2011) |

Mystery Repeats is the second full-length album by Dutch hip hop duo Pete Philly and Perquisite. The album was released on 7 September 2007 in the Netherlands and Japan on ANTI- Records.

== Track listing ==
1. "Clap Kick Flow"
2. "Womb to Tomb"
3. "Fish to Fry"
4. "Hectic"
5. "Q&A"
6. "Believer"
7. "Awake"
8. "Traveller" (featuring Erminia Córdoba)
9. "Last Love Song"
10. "Freestyle"
11. "Third Degree"
12. "Balance" (featuring GMB)
13. "Empire"
14. "High Tide"
15. "Mystery Repeats"
16. "Time Flies"

== Chart ==
| Chart (2007) | Peak position |
|---|---|
| Dutch Albums (Album Top 100) | 2 |
