= Cornald Maas =

Dutch television presenter

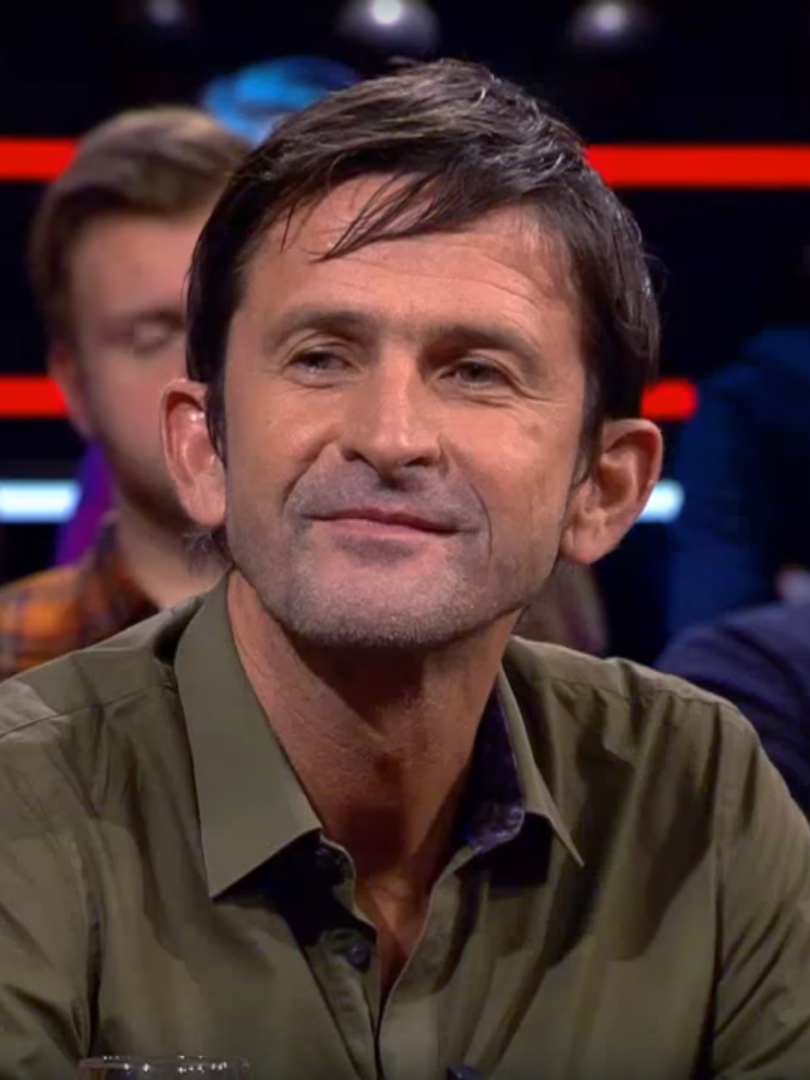
- Maas in 2017
- Born: 22 July 1962 (age 63); Bergen op Zoom, North Brabant, Netherlands
- Occupation: Television presenter

Cornald Maas (born 22 July 1962) is a Dutch television presenter known for presenting talk shows in the Netherlands. He is the brother of Frans Maas.

== Early career ==
He was an editor involved in The Scream of the Lion (VARA) with Paul de Leeuw, Sonja on Saturday (VARA) with Sonja Barend and Rolling Fire (NOS) with Philip Freriks and Leoni Jansen.

== Eurovision Song Contest ==
In 2004 and 2005, Maas provided the Dutch commentary for the Eurovision Song Contest semi-finals. He took over as regular commentator for the Dutch television in 2006 for both the semi's and the final after the regular Dutch commentator Willem van Beusekom stepped down and subsequently died the week of the contest from colon cancer. In 2006 and 2007 he co-hosted the finals with Paul de Leeuw (who was the spokesperson for the Netherlands). De Leeuw was providing the commentary from the Netherlands via satellite project Olympus. On 29 June 2010, Maas announced he would not be commenting at The 56th Eurovision Song Contest in Düsseldorf, Germany. This was because he had been sacked by the broadcaster TROS (which took over from NOS in 2010). Maas' replacements were his co-host at the 2010 Eurovision Song Contest Daniël Dekker and Dutch singer Jan Smit. In 2014, Maas was recalled again as a Eurovision commentator for the AVROTROS.

On 31 August 2019, Maas was named creative advisor for the Eurovision Song Contest 2020 in Rotterdam. He has since continued to be part of the selection committee for the Dutch entry to the Eurovision Song Contest 2022 and subsequent years.

== Other activities ==
In 2007 Maas was one of the judges for the Dutch version of Just The Two Of Us on TV channel Tien. Maas was a regular guest at De Wereld Draait Door. Since October 2008 he presented a weekly television program Opium for AVROTROS, with 2009 and 2010 Opium specials from the Uitmarkt and Oerol Festival. Maas writes a series about children of divorced parents for de Volkskrant. He appeared in a 2024 episode of the television show The Masked Singer.
