= AVROTROS =

Dutch public broadcaster

- Type: Public broadcasting association
- Branding: Popularist; General-interest
- Country: Netherlands
- Founded: 1 January 2014; 12 years ago
- Motto: De omroep voor ons (lit. 'The broadcaster for [all of] us')
- Headquarters: Witte Kruislaan 55, Hilversum
- Key people: Taco Zimmerman (CEO)
- Official website: Official website
- Replaced: AVRO; TROS

AVROTROS (Dutch pronunciation: [ˌaːvroːˈtrɔs]) is a public broadcaster within the Dutch public broadcasting system. It officially launched on 1 January 2014 as the result of a merger between the Algemene Vereniging Radio Omroep (AVRO) and the Televisie Radio Omroep Stichting (TROS). From 7 September 2014 onward, all programmes of both organisations were broadcast exclusively under the AVROTROS name. The broadcaster positions itself as a general-audience, politically and religiously neutral organisation, with programming centred on accessible culture and contributing to an informed, safe and fair society.

== History ==
=== Predecessors ===
AVRO originated in 1923 as the Hilversumsche Draadlooze Omroep (HDO), founded by the Nederlandsche Seintoestellen Fabriek (NSF). It was one of the earliest organised radio broadcasters in the Netherlands and the country's oldest public broadcasting association. In 1927, HDO merged with the Nederlandsche Omroep Vereeniging (NOV) to form the Algemene Vereniging Radio Omroep (lit. 'General Radio Broadcasting Association').

At the time, Dutch society was organised into distinct religious and political pillars, each maintaining its own broadcasting institutions. AVRO positioned itself outside this pillarised structure by adopting a neutral profile aimed at the general public, irrespective of ideological or confessional affiliation. Owing to this stance, the broadcaster was commonly associated with the liberal pillar, which opposed the segmentation of society into separate denominational spheres. From 2000 until the 2014 merger, AVRO was headquartered in the AKN building in Hilversum.

TROS was founded in 1964 as a successor to the offshore pirate broadcaster TV Noordzee, which had operated from the REM platform before being shut down under the 1964 REM Act. TROS embraced a popularist, entertainment-driven style and quickly grew into one of the Netherlands' most popular broadcasters. From 1970 onward, it operated from the former Christelijk Lyceum building in Hilversum.

Logo used until 2020

=== Merger and consolidation ===
On 20 June 2012, it was announced that AVRO and TROS would relocate to the former Wereldomroep building as part of their merger process. The merger was formalised in 2014.

Due to limitations to the number of public broadcasters that can get permanent recognition, AVROTROS has formed a cooperative broadcasting organisation (samenwerkingsomroep) with PowNed since 2022, enabling them to operate under a joint broadcasting licence. In 2025, the two organisations announced plans to form a shared 'broadcasting house' (omroephuis) by 2029, integrating organisational structures while maintaining distinct identities.

== Identity ==
AVROTROS is a broadcaster with a broad, general-audience focus. It is not aligned with any political current, social movement or religion. Its programming centres on accessible culture and justice, encouraging shared experiences and contributing to an informed, safe and fair society.

== Programmes ==
- Beste Zangers
- Brugklas
- Buitenhof
- Dit was het nieuws
- EenVandaag
- Eva
- Flikken Maastricht
- Junior Songfestival
- Junior Eurovision Song Contest
- Kids Top 20
- Koefnoen
- De Luizenmoeder
- Eurovision Song Contest (2014–2025)
- Wie is de Mol?

== Presenters ==
=== Television ===
- Ron Boszhard
- Britt Dekker
- Antoinette Hertsenberg
- Eva Jinek
- Jeroen van Koningsbrugge
- Cornald Maas
- Ivo Niehe
- Frits Sissing
- Jan Smit
- Rik van de Westelaken

=== Radio ===
- Bart Arens
- Annemieke Schollaardt
- Humberto Tan
