= Burning Daylight (song) =

2023 song by Mia Nicolai and Dion Cooper

Single by Mia Nicolai and Dion Cooper
- Released: 1 March 2023
- Length: 3:04
- Label: Yellowfield
- Songwriters: Duncan Laurence; Jordan Garfield; Mia Nicolai; Dion Cooper; Loek van der Grinten
- Producers: Sean Myer; Loek van der Grinten

Music video
- "Burning Daylight" on YouTube

Eurovision Song Contest 2023 entry
- Country: Netherlands
- Artists: Mia Nicolai and Dion Cooper
- Language: English
- Composers: Duncan Laurence; Jordan Garfield; Mia Nicolai; Dion Cooper; Loek van der Grinten
- Lyricists: Duncan Laurence; Jordan Garfield; Mia Nicolai; Dion Cooper; Loek van der Grinten

Finals performance
- Semi-final result: 13th
- Semi-final points: 7

Entry chronology
- ◄ "De diepte" (2022)
- "Europapa" (2024) ►

"Burning Daylight" is a song by Dutch singers Mia Nicolai and Dion Cooper, released on 1 March 2023. The song represented the Netherlands in the Eurovision Song Contest 2023 after the artists were internally selected by AVROTROS, the Dutch broadcaster for the Eurovision Song Contest.

== Eurovision Song Contest ==
=== Internal selection ===
A submission period was opened by the broadcaster on 17 May 2022 where artists and composers were able to submit their entries until 31 August 2022. Each artist and songwriter was able to submit a maximum of three songs, which were judged by a selection commission consisting of AVROTROS general director Eric van Stade, television presenter and author Cornald Maas, singer and television presenter Jan Smit, radio DJs Hila Noorzai, Carolien Borgers and Sander Lantinga.

AVROTROS announced Mia Nicolai and Dion Cooper as the Dutch entrants on 1 November 2022. On 22 February 2023, the duo would announce that their song for the Eurovision Song Contest 2023 would be released on 1 March. Six days later, the duo announced the title of their song as "Burning Daylight".

=== At Eurovision ===
According to Eurovision rules, all nations with the exceptions of the host country and the "Big Five" (France, Germany, Italy, Spain and the United Kingdom) are required to qualify from one of two semi-finals in order to compete for the final; the top ten countries from each semi-final progress to the final. The European Broadcasting Union (EBU) split up the competing countries into six different pots based on voting patterns from previous contests, with countries with favourable voting histories put into the same pot. On 31 January 2023, an allocation draw was held, which placed each country into one of the two semi-finals, and determined which half of the show they would perform in. The Netherlands was placed into the first semi-final, which was held on 9 May 2023, and performed in the second half of the semi-final show. The song did not qualify for the finals.

== Charts ==
Chart performance for "Burning Daylight"
Chart (2023)	Peak position
Netherlands (Dutch Top 40)	21
Netherlands (Single Top 100)	42
