= Dion Cooper =

Dutch singer and songwriter

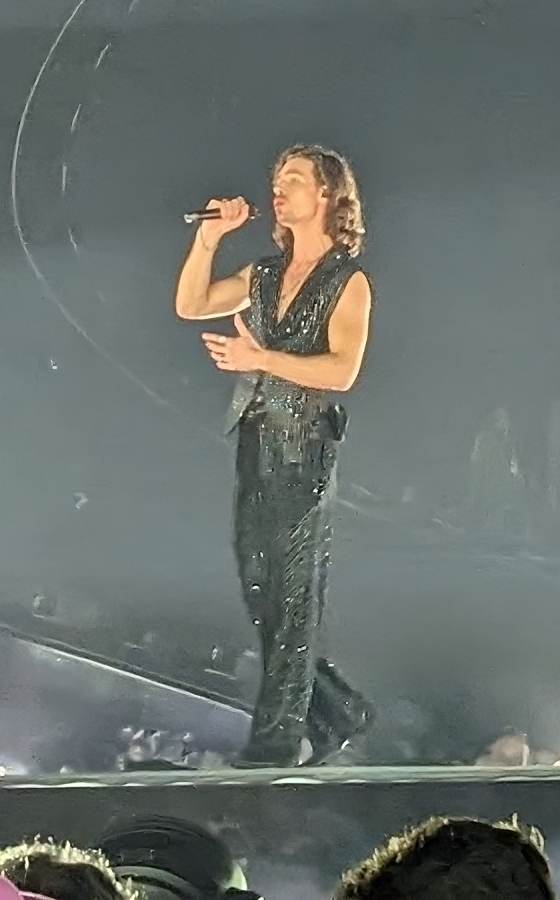
- Cooper performing in the Eurovision Song Contest 2023

Background information
- Born: Dion Cuiper; 29 November 1993 (age 32)
- Origin: Ouder-Amstel, Netherlands
- Occupations: Singer; songwriter
- Instruments: Vocal; guitar
- Years active: 2015–present
- Website: www.dioncooper.com

Dion Cuiper (Dutch: [diˈjɔŋ ˈkœypər]; born 29 November 1993), known professionally as Dion Cooper, is a Dutch singer-songwriter. He represented the Netherlands in the Eurovision Song Contest 2023 alongside Mia Nicolai with the song "Burning Daylight".

== Early life and education ==
Cuiper was born on 29 November 1993 and grew up in Ouderkerk aan de Amstel, North Holland, close to Amsterdam. His father, who used to be a drummer in a funk band, introduced him to the music of, among others, Toto, the Police, Earth, Wind & Fire, the Beatles and Jimi Hendrix. Cuiper developed an interest for music and began playing the guitar at the age of 15. He later started writing and singing his own songs.

After completing his secondary education, Cuiper began studying international business and management, but dropped out at the age of 21 to focus on his musical career. He has cited Shawn Mendes, John Mayer and Harry Styles as his musical inspirations.

== Career ==
=== 2015–2022: The Voice of Holland and Too Young Too Dumb ===
In 2015, Cuiper took part in the sixth season of The Voice of Holland. He advanced to the Battles, joining the team of rapper Ali B. He was eliminated after losing the Battle to Brace.

The Voice of Holland performances and results
Round	Song	Original artist	Result
Blind Audition	"Feeling Good"	Muse	Joined Team Ali B
The Battles	"Never nooit meer"	Re-Play & Gordon	Eliminated

In 2021, Cuiper released his debut extended play Too Young Too Dumb. Later that year, he was a support act for Duncan Laurence during his 2021 club tour. In 2022, he released the singles "Know" and "Blue Jeans", which were co-written with Laurence.

=== 2023: Eurovision Song Contest ===
On 1 November 2022, the Dutch broadcaster AVROTROS announced that Cuiper had been selected to represent the Netherlands in the Eurovision Song Contest 2023, alongside Mia Nicolai. Their entry "Burning Daylight" was released on 1 March 2023. Nicolai and Cooper performed in the first semi-final, but failed to qualify for the final.

== Discography ==
=== Extended plays ===
- Too Young Too Dumb (2021)

=== Singles ===
Title	Year	Peak chart positions		Album or EP
Title	Year	NLD (100)	NLD (40)	Album or EP
"Much Higher"	2020	—	—	Non-album single
"Jealousy"	2020	—	—	Too Young Too Dumb
"Too Young Too Dumb"	2020	—	—	Too Young Too Dumb
"Simple"	2020	—	—	Too Young Too Dumb
"Bobbie's Song"	2020	—	—	Non-album single
"Cold"	2021	—	—	Too Young Too Dumb
"Fire" (featuring Maxine)	2021	—	—	Too Young Too Dumb
"Know"	2022	—	—	Non-album singles
"Blue Jeans"	2022	—	—	Non-album singles
"Burning Daylight" (with Mia Nicolai)	2023	42	21	Non-album singles
"—" denotes a recording that did not chart or was not released in that territory.

Awards and achievements
Preceded by S10 with "De diepte"	Netherlands in the Eurovision Song Contest; 2023; With: Mia Nicolai	Succeeded by Joost Klein with "Europapa"
