= Netherlands in the Eurovision Song Contest =

- Eurovision Song Contest
- Participating broadcaster: AVROTROS (2014–2025) Formerly: Nederlandse Televisie Stichting (NTS; 1956–1969); Nederlandse Omroep Stichting (NOS; 1970–2009); TROS (2010–2013)

Participation summary
- Appearances: 65 (54 finals) (Note: The 2024 entry qualified for the final, but was removed from the competition following a backstage incident during the semi-final. The Netherlands retained the right to vote in the final.)
- First appearance: 1956
- Last appearance: 2025
- Highest placement: 1st: 1957, 1959, 1969, 1975, 2019
- Host: 1958, 1970, 1976, 1980, ~~2020~~, (Note: The 2020 contest was cancelled due to the COVID-19 pandemic.) 2021
- Participation history: 1956; 1957; 1958; 1959; 1960; 1961; 1962; 1963; 1964; 1965; 1966; 1967; 1968; 1969; 1970; 1971; 1972; 1973; 1974; 1975; 1976; 1977; 1978; 1979; 1980; 1981; 1982; 1983; 1984; 1985; 1986; 1987; 1988; 1989; 1990; 1991; 1992; 1993; 1994; 1995; 1996; 1997; 1998; 1999; 2000; 2001; 2002; 2003; 2004; 2005; 2006; 2007; 2008; 2009; 2010; 2011; 2012; 2013; 2014; 2015; 2016; 2017; 2018; 2019; ~~2020~~; 2021; 2022; 2023; 2024; 2025; 2026

Related articles
- Nationaal Songfestival

External links
- AVROTROS page
- Netherlands's page at Eurovision.com
- For the most recent participation see Netherlands in the Eurovision Song Contest 2025

The Netherlands has been represented at the Eurovision Song Contest 65 times since making its debut as one of the seven countries at the first contest in 1956. The country has missed six contests, twice because the dates coincided with Remembrance of the Dead (1985 and 1991), twice because of being relegated due to poor results the previous year (1995 and 2002), and twice due to the inclusion of Israel in the context of the Gaza war (2026 and 2027). It has missed the final despite qualifying once, in 2024, due to the alleged personal misconduct of its entrant which led to disqualification. The most recent Dutch participating broadcaster in the contest is AVROTROS. The Netherlands has hosted the contest five times: in Hilversum (1958), Amsterdam (1970), The Hague (1976 and 1980), and Rotterdam (2021).

The Netherlands has won the contest five times, with "Net als toen" performed by Corry Brokken (1957), "Een beetje" by Teddy Scholten (1959), "De troubadour" by Lenny Kuhr in a four-way tie (1969), "Ding-a-dong" by Teach-In (1975), and "Arcade" by Duncan Laurence (2019). The country's other top five results are "Als het om de liefde gaat" by Sandra and Andres (fourth, 1972), "I See a Star" by Mouth and MacNeal (third, 1974), "Amsterdam" by Maggie MacNeal (fifth, 1980), "Rechtop in de wind" by Marcha (fifth, 1987), "Hemel en aarde" by Edsilia Rombley (fourth, 1998), and "Calm After the Storm" by The Common Linnets (second, 2014). It finished last in 1958, 1962, 1963, 1968, and in the second semi-final in 2011.

After the introduction of semi-finals in 2004, the Netherlands failed to reach the final for eight years in a row from 2005 to 2012, but has since participated in nine of the last thirteen finals.

== History ==
=== 1956–1969: Nederlandse Televisie Stichting ===
The Netherlands was one of seven countries to participate in the contest's inaugural edition in 1956, represented by the public broadcaster Nederlandse Televisie Stichting (NTS). From the contest's inception, NTS established an annual national final, Nationaal Songfestival, to select its Eurovision entries. Success followed quickly: in 1957, Corry Brokken won the contest in Frankfurt with "Net als toen", giving the Netherlands its first victory. As a result, NTS hosted the 1958 contest in Hilversum. The Netherlands secured a second victory just two years later at the 1959 contest in Cannes, where Teddy Scholten performed "Een beetje", a song about being unfaithful in a relationship. Because NTS had only recently hosted the 1958 edition, it declined to host again; the 1960 contest was therefore held in London.

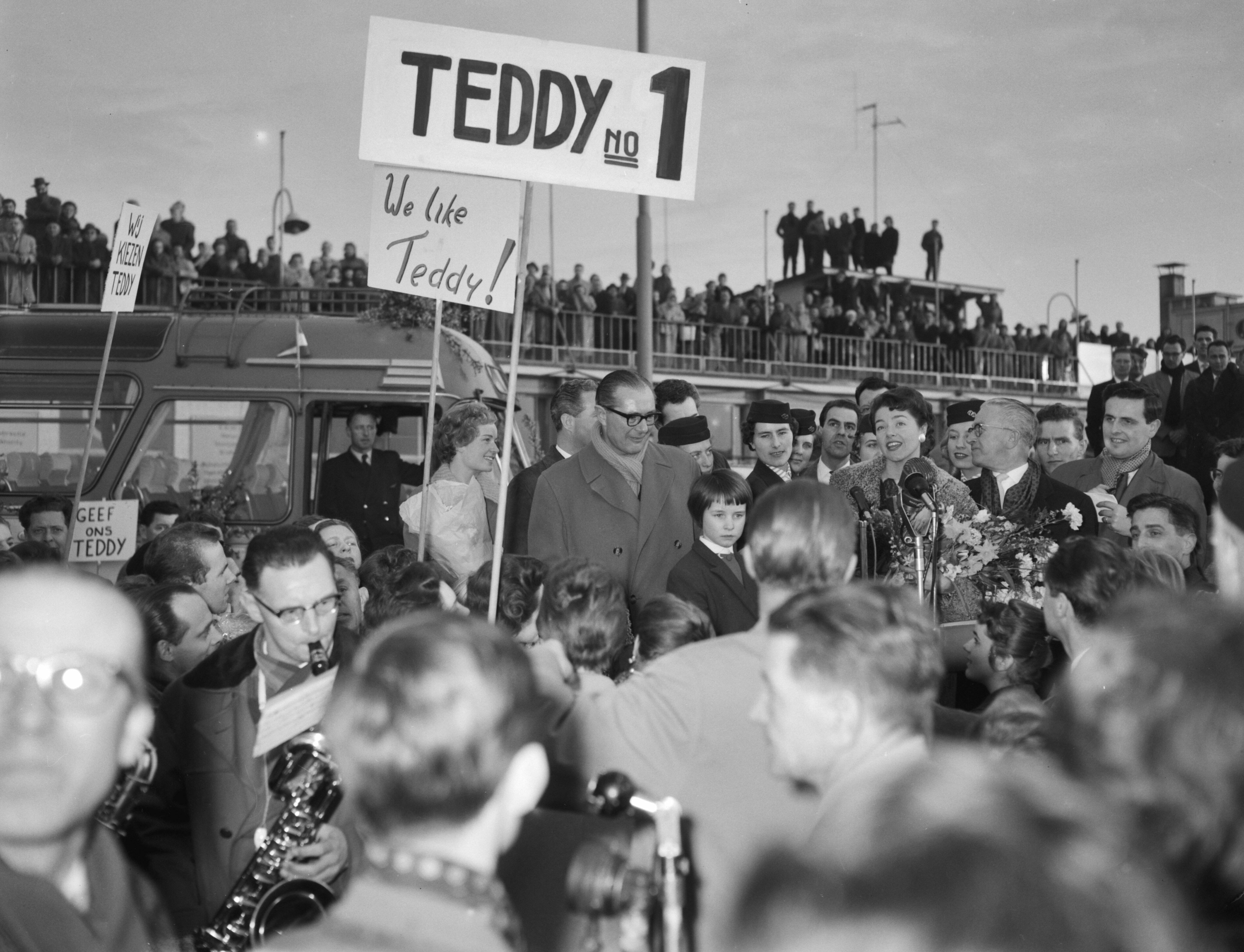
Teddy Scholten arriving at Schiphol Airport after winning the 1959 edition

This initial period of success was followed by a string of poor results, including consecutive nul-points finishes in 1962 and 1963. Despite these competitive struggles, the Dutch entries set significant milestones for diversity and representation within the contest. In 1964, the Netherlands was represented by Anneke Grönloh, the first performer of Asian origin to appear in the competition. Two years later, in 1966, Dutch representative Milly Scott became the first Black artist to participate. Following another last-place finish in 1968 with Ronnie Tober's "Morgen", the Netherlands achieved a major turning point in 1969. At the international final in Madrid, the Dutch entry, "De troubadour" by Lenny Kuhr, finished in a four-way tie for first place alongside France, the United Kingdom, and Spain. Because the contest lacked a tie-breaking mechanism at the time, all four countries were declared joint winners.

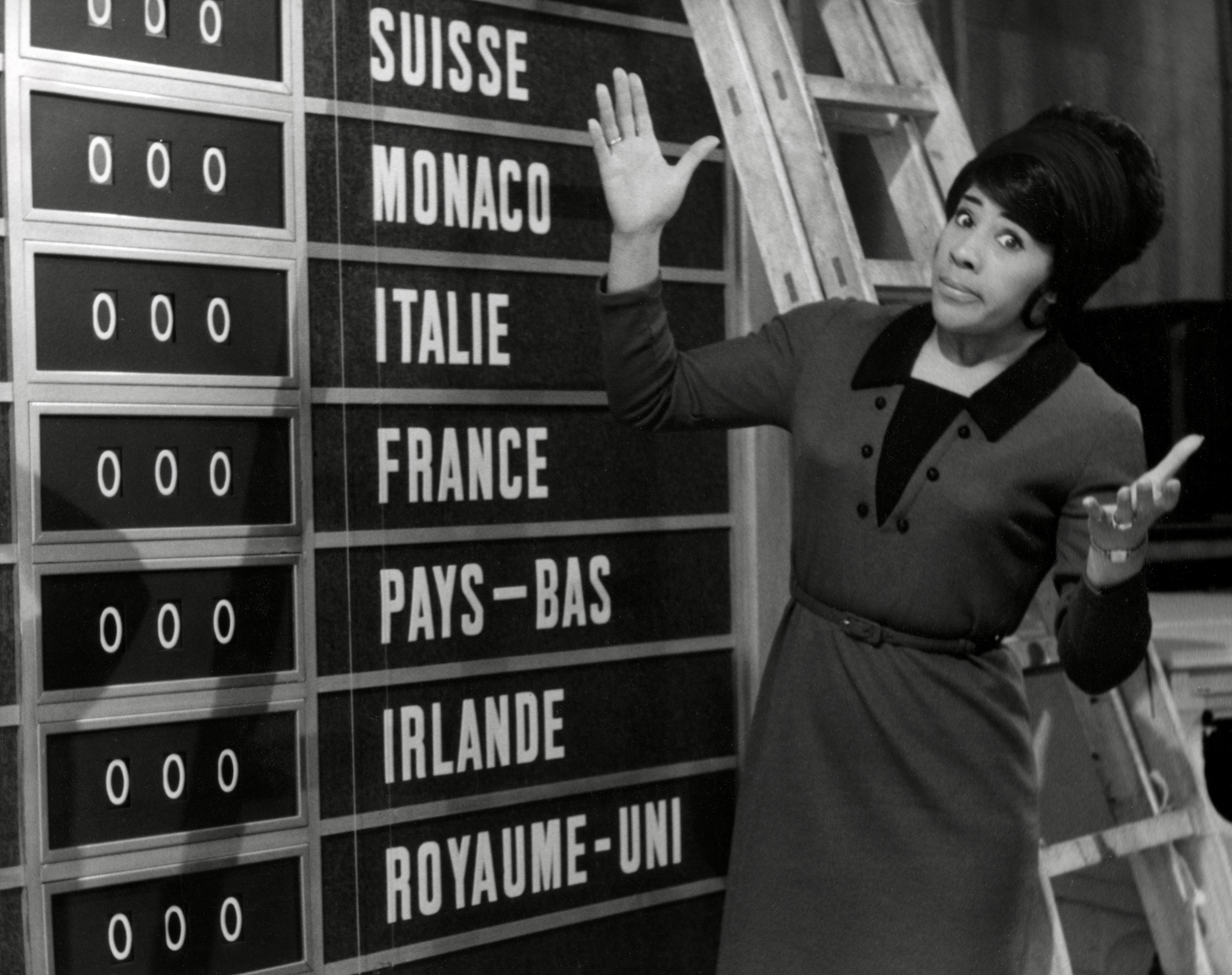
Milly Scott posing before the 1966 scoreboard

=== 1970–2009: Nederlandse Omroep Stichting ===
In May 1969, NTS merged into the Nederlandse Omroep Stichting (NOS), which assumed responsibility for the country's Eurovision participation beginning in 1970. Following the four-way tie of 1969, the Netherlands won a drawing of lots against France to secure the hosting rights for the 1970 contest. The event was staged at the RAI Convention Centre in Amsterdam and hosted by Willy Dobbe. The Netherlands continued to achieve strong results throughout the early 1970s; Sandra and Andres finished fourth in 1972 with "Als het om de liefde gaat", followed by a third-place finish in 1974 with "I See a Star" by Mouth and MacNeal. In 1975, Teach-In won the Nationaal Songfestival and went on to secure the country's fourth Eurovision victory in Stockholm. Their entry, "Ding-a-dong", received six 12-point scores and became the first song in Eurovision history to win the contest from the opening position of the running order.

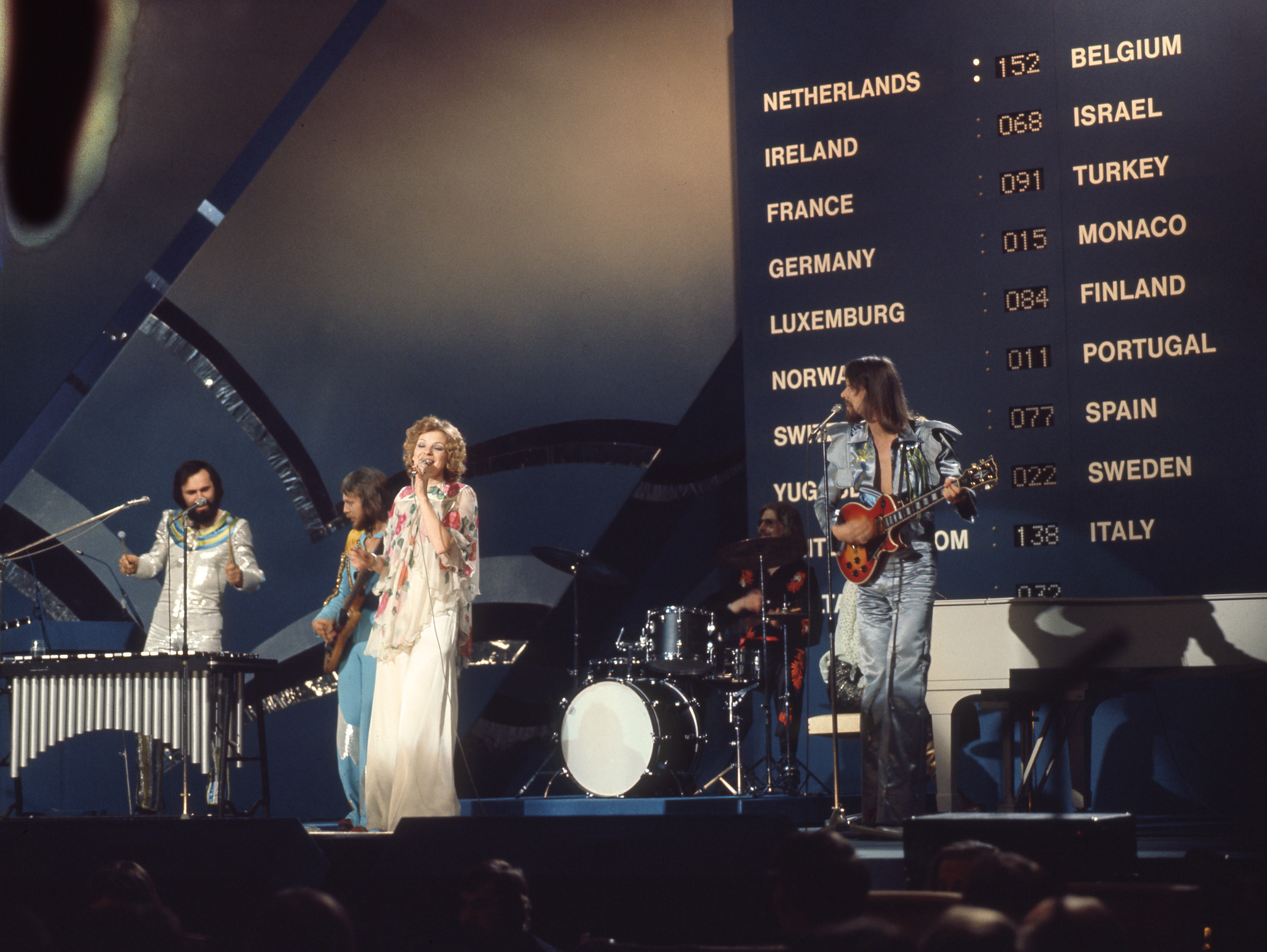
Teach-In on stage for their 1975 winner's reprise

As the reigning champions, the Netherlands hosted the 1976 contest at the Congresgebouw in The Hague, with 1957 winner Corry Brokken serving as presenter. Returning artist Sandra Reemer placed ninth with "The Party's Over". The Congresgebouw hosted the competition again in 1980 after Israel, having won two consecutive editions, declined hosting duties. The Dutch entry that year, Maggie MacNeal's "Amsterdam", achieved a fifth-place finish. In 1982, the national selection courted controversy when the song "Jij en ik" was chosen over "Fantasy Island"; performed by Bill van Dijk, it ultimately finished third-to-last at the international final. The Netherlands withdrew from the contest for the first time in 1985, because the event coincided with the national Remembrance of the Dead. Instead, the contest was aired with Dutch commentary as part of an experimental Europa TV broadcast the following day.

In 1986, facing financial constraints, NOS collaborated with fellow public broadcaster Veronica, which agreed to broadcast the contest and cover the participation fees. The following year, Marcha finished in a joint-fifth place with "Rechtop in de wind", marking the country's first top-five result since 1980. The Netherlands withdrew for a second time in 1991, as the final again fell on Remembrance Day. In 1993 and 1994, NOS internally selected an artist, and used Nationaal Songfestival to select the song. This method yielded a sixth-place finish for Ruth Jacott and "Vrede" in 1993, but proved less successful in 1994 when Willeke Alberti's "Waar is de zon?" placed 23rd, resulting in the country's relegation from the 1995 contest.

Nationaal Songfestival returned in 1996 with a revamped format featuring five semi-finals. The eventual winners, Maxine and Franklin Brown, placed seventh in Oslo with "De eerste keer". Two years later, Edsilia Rombley secured fourth place with "Hemel en aarde", achieving the Netherlands' best Eurovision result since 1975. However, fortunes declined into the new millennium; Michelle's 18th-place finish with "Out on My Own" in 2001 led to a forced relegation from the 2002 contest. The Netherlands returned in 2003 with Esther Hart, who placed 13th with "One More Night" and was honoured with the Marcel Bezençon Artistic Award. This brief recovery was cut short by the introduction of the semi-final format in 2004; following Glennis Grace's failure to qualify with "My Impossible Dream" in 2005, the Netherlands entered a lengthy non-qualification streak.

=== 2010–2025: TROS and AVROTROS ===
In 2010, TROS succeeded NOS as participating broadcaster, after NOS decided that handling the country's Eurovision participation no longer aligned with its core public broadcasting tasks. That year, Sieneke was selected to perform the song "Ik ben verliefd (Sha-la-lie)", but failed to qualify for the final. 3JS had the lowest score of all participants in the 2011 contest, and in 2012, Joan Franka also failed to qualify. The Netherlands missed out on the final eight years in a row, making it the country with the longest period of non-qualification in the contest.

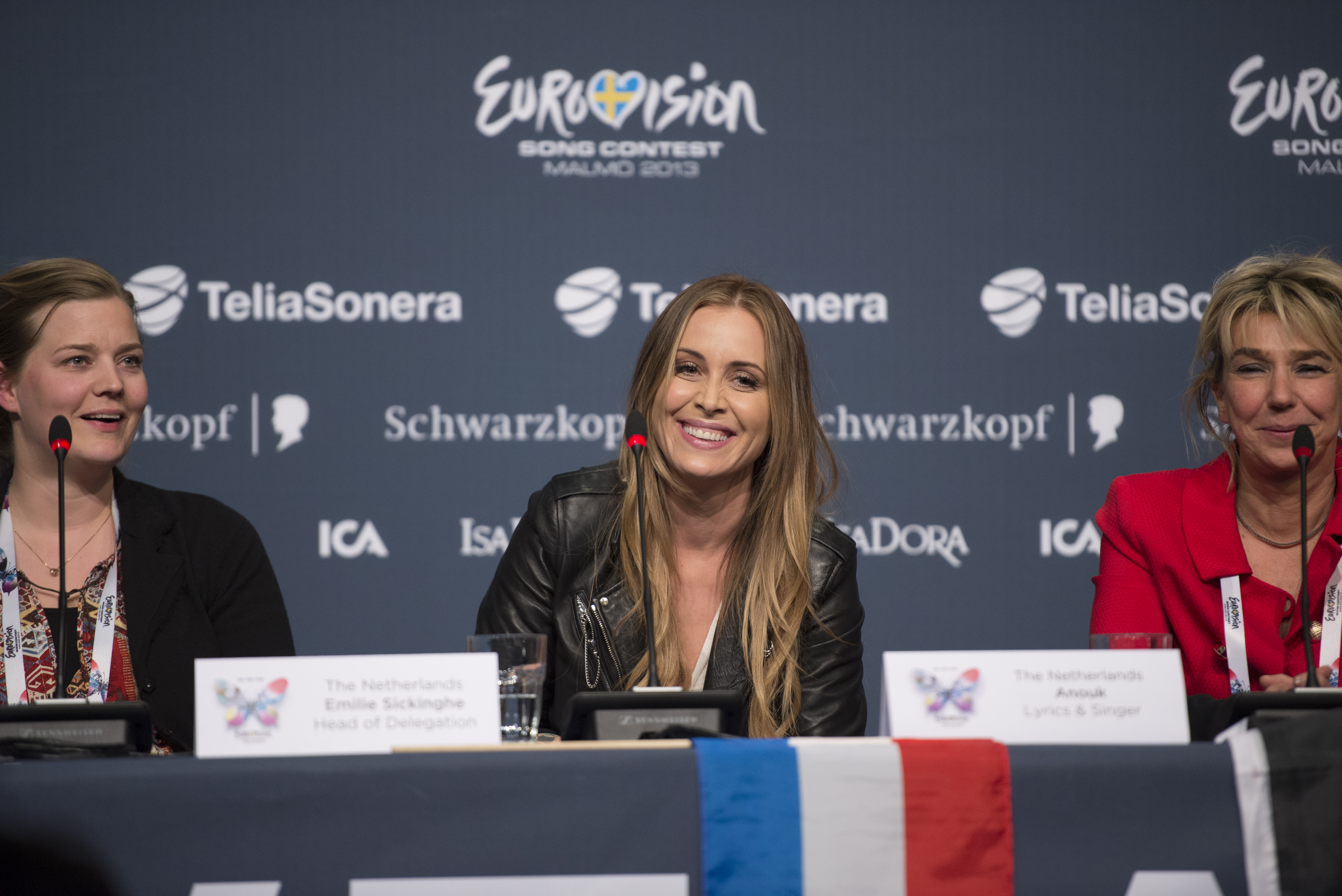
Anouk at a press conference after qualifying for the 2013 final

To reverse this trend, TROS shifted its strategy in 2013 by internally selecting rock singer Anouk. Granted full artistic freedom, Anouk performed "Birds", advancing to the final and securing the Netherlands' first top 10 finish since 1999. Building on this success, TROS – which merged into AVROTROS the next year – continued to select its entry internally. In 2014, the Common Linnets won their semi-final and finished second overall with "Calm After the Storm". Aside from a 2015 non-qualification by Trijntje Oosterhuis, the Netherlands achieved steady success over the next three years, qualifying with Douwe Bob (11th), Ogene (11th), and Waylon (18th). The resurgence culminated in 2019, when Duncan Laurence secured the country's fifth victory – and first in 44 years – with the song "Arcade".

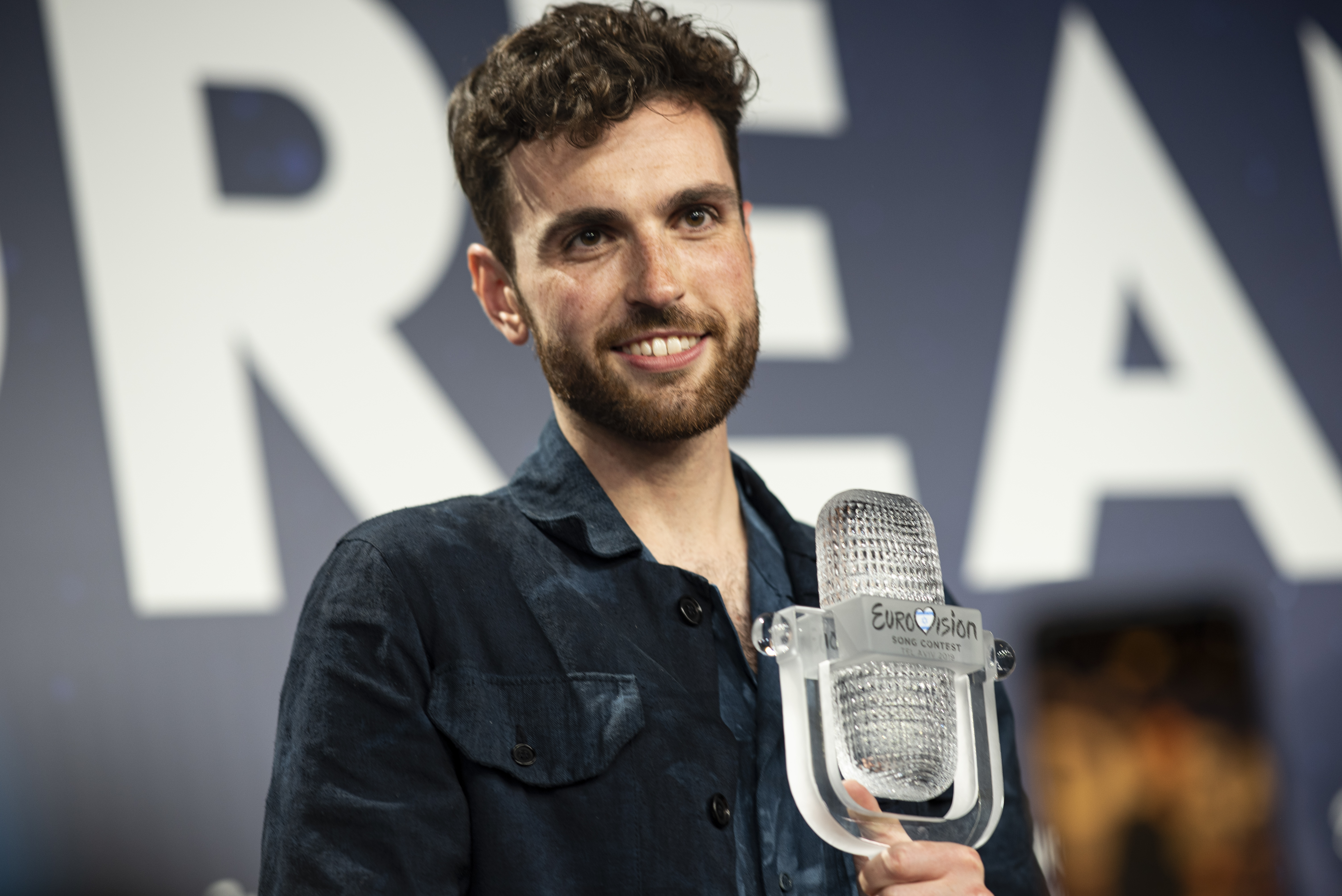
Duncan Laurence with the 2019 trophy

Rotterdam was chosen to host the 2020 contest, which was ultimately cancelled due to the COVID-19 pandemic and replaced by the non-competitive broadcast Eurovision: Europe Shine a Light from Hilversum. Rotterdam Ahoy staged the rescheduled event in 2021, hosted by Chantal Janzen, Jan Smit, Edsilia Rombley, and Nikkie de Jager. Automatic finalist Jeangu Macrooy placed 23rd with "Birth of a New Age", notably introducing the Sranan Tongo language to the contest. The country's momentum continued in 2022 when S10 finished 11th with "De diepte", the first Dutch-language entry since 2010. However, the qualification streak was ended the following year, when Mia Nicolai and Dion Cooper failed to advance from the semi-finals. In 2024, Joost Klein placed second in his semi-final with "Europapa", but was disqualified prior to the final following an altercation with a production staff member. The most recent Dutch participation in 2025 saw Claude finishing 12th with the song "C'est la vie".

=== 2026–present: Boycott due to Israeli participation ===
On 4 December 2025, AVROTROS announced that it would not take part in the 2026 contest, citing the inclusion of Israel amidst the ongoing Gaza war. The contest was instead broadcast by NOS and NTR.

On 2 July 2026, AVROTROS announced that it would decide on its participation in 2027 by late August or early September, following an evaluation of the 2026 contest. In response to parliamentary questions, culture minister Rianne Letschert confirmed that Nederlandse Publieke Omroep (NPO), the umbrella organisation of the Dutch public broadcasting system, would engage in talks regarding participation by another broadcaster should AVROTROS decide not to. Omroep Max expressed willingness to take over participation in the contest should NPO offer financial backing, but later rescinded its interest. BNNVARA, EO, and KRO-NCRV reportedly also ruled themselves out. On 24 August 2026, AVROTROS announced it would not return in 2027, maintaining that Israel's continued participation compromises the event's neutrality, and defer responsibility of Dutch participation in the contest to NPO. Dutch media group Talpa Network offered its support to NPO should the organisation opt to continue participation in the contest. On 23 September 2026, after a deadline extension, NPO initially confirmed that it would take part in 2027. It also announced that, for the first time in the country's participation history, the Dutch entry selection would be a joint project of the public broadcasters, coordinated by NPO; an independent team would be set up to take responsibility for selecting and supporting the Dutch entrant.

On 27 October 2026, NPO announced it would reverse its decision and not take part in 2027, citing "different sensitivities" and a lack of support among its members. It added that it would still broadcast all three shows of the contest through NOS. In response to another parlimentary inquiry in November, Letschert confirmed that NPO does not have the mandate to independently organise the selection of a Eurovision entry, as it is considered "media content" and can therefore only be done by an NPO member.

== Participation overview ==
Table key
1	First place
2	Second place
3	Third place
◁	Last place
◇	Entry selected but did not compete
†	Upcoming event

Year	Artist	Song	Language	Final		Semi-final	
Year	Artist	Song	Language	Place	Points	Place	Points
1956	Jetty Paerl	"De vogels van Holland"	Dutch	—N/a (Note: The 1956 contest had secret voting and, apart from the winner, no results were released.)	—N/a	No semi-finals	
1956	Corry Brokken	"Voorgoed voorbij"	Dutch	—N/a	—N/a	No semi-finals	
1957	Corry Brokken	"Net als toen"	Dutch	1	31	No semi-finals	
1958	Corry Brokken	"Heel de wereld"	Dutch	9 ◁	1	No semi-finals	
1959	Teddy Scholten	"Een beetje"	Dutch	1	21	No semi-finals	
1960	Rudi Carrell	"Wat een geluk"	Dutch	12	2	No semi-finals	
1961	Greetje Kauffeld	"Wat een dag"	Dutch	10	6	No semi-finals	
1962	De Spelbrekers	"Katinka"	Dutch	13 ◁	0	No semi-finals	
1963	Annie Palmen	"Een speeldoos"	Dutch	13 ◁	0	No semi-finals	
1964	Anneke Grönloh	"Jij bent mijn leven"	Dutch	10	2	No semi-finals	
1965	Conny Vandenbos	"Het is genoeg"	Dutch	11	5	No semi-finals	
1966	Milly Scott	"Fernando en Philippo"	Dutch	15	2	No semi-finals	
1967	Thérèse Steinmetz	"Ringe-dinge"	Dutch	14	2	No semi-finals	
1968	Ronnie Tober	"Morgen"	Dutch	16 ◁	1	No semi-finals	
1969	Lenny Kuhr	"De troubadour"	Dutch	1	18	No semi-finals	
1970	Patricia and Hearts of Soul	"Waterman"	Dutch	7	7	No semi-finals	
1971	Saskia and Serge	"Tijd"	Dutch	6	85	No semi-finals	
1972	Sandra and Andres	"Als het om de liefde gaat"	Dutch	4	106	No semi-finals	
1973	Ben Cramer	"De oude muzikant"	Dutch	14	69	No semi-finals	
1974	Mouth and MacNeal	"I See a Star"	English	3	15	No semi-finals	
1975	Teach-In	"Ding-a-dong"	English	1	152	No semi-finals	
1976	Sandra Reemer	"The Party Is Over Now"	English	9	56	No semi-finals	
1977	Heddy Lester	"De mallemolen"	Dutch	12	35	No semi-finals	
1978	Harmony	"'t Is OK"	Dutch	13	37	No semi-finals	
1979	Xandra	"Colorado"	Dutch	12	51	No semi-finals	
1980	Maggie MacNeal	"Amsterdam"	Dutch	5	93	No semi-finals	
1981	Linda Williams	"Het is een wonder"	Dutch	9	51	No semi-finals	
1982	Bill van Dijk	"Jij en ik"	Dutch	16	8	No semi-finals	
1983	Bernadette	"Sing Me a Song"	Dutch	7	66	No semi-finals	
1984	Maribelle	"Ik hou van jou"	Dutch	13	34	No semi-finals	
1986	Frizzle Sizzle	"Alles heeft ritme"	Dutch	13	40	No semi-finals	
1987	Marcha	"Rechtop in de wind"	Dutch	5	83	No semi-finals	
1988	Gerard Joling	"Shangri-La"	Dutch	9	70	No semi-finals	
1989	Justine Pelmelay	"Blijf zoals je bent"	Dutch	15	45	No semi-finals	
1990	Maywood	"Ik wil alles met je delen"	Dutch	15	25	No semi-finals	
1992	Humphrey Campbell	"Wijs me de weg"	Dutch	9	67	No semi-finals	
1993	Ruth Jacott	"Vrede"	Dutch	6	92	No semi-finals	
1994	Willeke Alberti	"Waar is de zon"	Dutch	23	4	No semi-finals	
1996	Maxine and Franklin Brown	"De eerste keer"	Dutch	7	78	9	63
1997	Mrs. Einstein	"Niemand heeft nog tijd"	Dutch	22	5	No semi-finals	
1998	Edsilia	"Hemel en aarde"	Dutch	4	150	No semi-finals	
1999	Marlayne	"One Good Reason"	English	8	71	No semi-finals	
2000	Linda Wagenmakers	"No Goodbyes"	English	13	40	No semi-finals	
2001	Michelle	"Out on My Own"	English	18	16	No semi-finals	
2003	Esther Hart	"One More Night"	English	13	45	No semi-finals	
2004	Re-union	"Without You"	English	20	11	6	146
2005	Glennis Grace	"My Impossible Dream"	English	Failed to qualify		14	53
2006	Treble	"Amambanda"	Imaginary, English	Failed to qualify		20	22
2007	Edsilia Rombley	"On Top of the World"	English	Failed to qualify		21	38
2008	Hind	"Your Heart Belongs to Me"	English	Failed to qualify		13	27
2009	The Toppers	"Shine"	English	Failed to qualify		17	11
2010	Sieneke	"Ik ben verliefd (Sha-la-lie)"	Dutch	Failed to qualify		14	29
2011	3JS	"Never Alone"	English	Failed to qualify		19 ◁	13
2012	Joan Franka	"You and Me"	English	Failed to qualify		15	35
2013	Anouk	"Birds"	English	9	114	6	75
2014	The Common Linnets	"Calm After the Storm"	English	2	238	1	150
2015	Trijntje Oosterhuis	"Walk Along"	English	Failed to qualify		14	33
2016	Douwe Bob	"Slow Down"	English	11	153	5	197
2017	Ogene	"Lights and Shadows"	English	11	150	4	200
2018	Waylon	"Outlaw in 'Em"	English	18	121	7	174
2019	Duncan Laurence	"Arcade"	English	1	498	1	280
2020	Jeangu Macrooy ◇	"Grow" ◇	English ◇	Contest cancelled			
2021	Jeangu Macrooy	"Birth of a New Age"	English, Sranan Tongo	23	11	Host country	
2022	S10	"De diepte"	Dutch	11	171	2	221
2023	Mia Nicolai and Dion Cooper	"Burning Daylight"	English	Failed to qualify		13	7
2024	Joost Klein	"Europapa"	Dutch	Disqualified		2	182
2025	Claude	"C'est la vie"	French, English	12	175	3	121

== Hostings ==
Table key
◇	Contest cancelled

Year	Location	Venue	Presenter(s)	Executive producer	Director	Musical director	Ref.
1958	Hilversum	AVRO Studios	Hannie Lips	Piet te Nuyl Jr.	Gijs Stappershoef	Dolf van der Linden	
1970	Amsterdam	RAI Congrescentrum	Willy Dobbe	Warner van Kampen	Theo Ordeman	Dolf van der Linden	
1976	The Hague	Congresgebouw	Corry Brokken	Fred Oster	Theo Ordeman	Jan Stulen	
1980	The Hague	Congresgebouw	Marlous Fluitsma	Fred Oster	Theo Ordeman	Rogier van Otterloo	
2020	Rotterdam ◇	Rotterdam Ahoy ◇	Chantal Janzen, Edsilia Rombley and Jan Smit ◇	Sietse Bakker and Inge van de Weerd ◇	Marnix Kaart, Marc Pos and Daniel Jelinek ◇	—N/a	
2021	Rotterdam	Rotterdam Ahoy	Chantal Janzen, Edsilia Rombley, Jan Smit and Nikkie de Jager	Sietse Bakker and Astrid Dutrénit	Marnix Kaart, Marc Pos and Daniel Jelinek	—N/a	

In addition to the contest proper, the Netherlands hosted Eurovision: Europe Shine a Light, a special non-competitive programme to replace the cancelled 2020 contest. The show was broadcast on 16 May 2020 from Studio 21 at Media Park in Hilversum, with Sietse Bakker serving as executive producer, and Chantal Janzen, Edsilia Rombley, and Jan Smit serving as presenters.

== Awards ==
=== Marcel Bezençon Awards ===
Year	Category	Song	Composer(s)	Performer	Final		Host city	Ref.
Year	Category	Song	Composer(s)	Performer	Place	Points	Host city	Ref.
2003	Artistic Award (Note: Voted by previous winners.)	"One More Night"	Tjeerd van Zanen; Alan Michael	Esther Hart	13	45	(Latvia) Riga	
2014	Artistic Award (Note: Voted by commentators.)	"Calm After the Storm"	Ilse de Lange; JB Meijers; Rob Crosby; Matthew Crosby; Jake Etheridge	The Common Linnets	2	238	(Denmark) Copenhagen	
2014	Composer Award	"Calm After the Storm"	Ilse de Lange; JB Meijers; Rob Crosby; Matthew Crosby; Jake Etheridge	The Common Linnets	2	238	(Denmark) Copenhagen	
2019	Press Award	"Arcade"	Duncan de Moor; Joel Sjöö; Wouter Hardy; Will Knox	Duncan Laurence	1	498	(Israel) Tel Aviv	

=== Barbara Dex Award ===
Year	Performer	Host city	Ref.
2015	Trijntje Oosterhuis	(Austria) Vienna	

== Related involvement ==
=== Spokespersons and conductors ===
Year	Spokesperson	Ref.	Conductor	Ref.
1956	No spokesperson		Fernando Paggi (Note: Conductor provided by the host broadcaster.)	
1957	Siebe van der Zee		Dolf van der Linden	
1958	Piet te Nuyl Jr.		Dolf van der Linden	
1959	Siebe van der Zee		Dolf van der Linden	
1960	Siebe van der Zee		Dolf van der Linden	
1961	Siebe van der Zee		Dolf van der Linden	
1962	Ger Lugtenburg		Dolf van der Linden	
1963	Unknown		Eric Robinson	
1964	Unknown		Dolf van der Linden	
1965	Dick van Bommel		Dolf van der Linden	
1966	Herman Brouwer		Dolf van der Linden	
1967	Unknown		Dolf van der Linden	
1968	Unknown		Dolf van der Linden	
1969	Unknown		Frans de Kok	
1970	Unknown		Dolf van der Linden	
1971	No spokesperson		Dolf van der Linden	
1972	No spokesperson		Harry van Hoof	
1973	No spokesperson		Harry van Hoof	
1974	Unknown		Harry van Hoof	
1975	Unknown		Harry van Hoof	
1976	Unknown		Harry van Hoof	
1977	Ralph Inbar		Harry van Hoof	
1978	Unknown		Harry van Hoof	
1979	Ivo Niehe		Harry van Hoof	
1980	Unknown		Rogier van Otterloo	
1981	Flip van der Schalie		Rogier van Otterloo	
1982	Flip van der Schalie		Rogier van Otterloo	
1983	Flip van der Schalie		Piet Souer	
1984	Flip van der Schalie		Rogier van Otterloo	
1986	Unknown		Harry van Hoof	
1987	Ralph Inbar		Rogier van Otterloo	
1988	Joop van Os		Harry van Hoof	
1989	Joop van Os		Harry van Hoof	
1990	Joop van Os		Harry van Hoof	
1992	Unknown		Harry van Hoof	
1993	Joop van Os		Harry van Hoof	
1994	Joop van Os		Harry van Hoof	
1996	Marcha		Dick Bakker	
1997	Corry Brokken		Dick Bakker	
1998	Conny Vandenbos		Dick Bakker	
1999	Edsilia Rombley		No conductor	
2000	Marlayne		No conductor	
2001	Marlayne		No conductor	
2003	Marlayne		No conductor	
2004	Esther Hart		No conductor	
2005	Nance Coolen		No conductor	
2006	Paul de Leeuw		No conductor	
2007	Paul de Leeuw and Edsilia Rombley		No conductor	
2008	Esther Hart		No conductor	
2009	Yolanthe Cabau		No conductor	
2010	Yolanthe Cabau		No conductor	
2011	Mandy Huydts		No conductor	
2012	Vivienne van den Assem		No conductor	
2013	Cornald Maas		No conductor	
2014	Tim Douwsma		No conductor	
2015	Edsilia Rombley		No conductor	
2016	Trijntje Oosterhuis		No conductor	
2017	Douwe Bob		No conductor	
2018	Ogene		No conductor	
2019	Emma Wortelboer		No conductor	
2021	Romy Monteiro (Note: Monteiro replaced Duncan Laurence, who had tested positive for COVID-19.)		No conductor	
2022	Jeangu Macrooy		No conductor	
2023	S10		No conductor	
2024	No spokesperson (Note: Nikkie de Jager was originally set to serve as the Netherlands' spokesperson, but withdrew following the disqualification of the Dutch entry from the final. Martin Österdahl, the contest's executive supervisor, announced the Dutch points instead.)		No conductor	
2025	Chantal Janzen		No conductor	

=== Heads of delegation ===
Each participating broadcaster in the Eurovision Song Contest assigns a head of delegation as the EBU's contact person and the leader of their delegation at the event. The delegation, whose size can greatly vary, includes a head of press, the performers, songwriters, composers, and backing vocalists, among others.

Year	Head of delegation	Ref.
2010–2019	Emilie Sickinghe	
2022–2023	Lars Lourenco	
2024	Twan van de Nieuwenhuijzen	
2025, ~~2027~~	Claudia van der Pas	

== Broadcasts and commentators ==
Over the years Dutch commentary has been provided by several experienced radio and television presenters, including Willem Duys, Ivo Niehe, Pim Jacobs, Ati Dijckmeester, and Paul de Leeuw. Willem van Beusekom provided NOS commentary every year from 1987 until 2005 (with the exceptions of 1991 and 1995). He was replaced by his co-commentator Cornald Maas, who commentated on the contest from 2004 until 2010.

On 29 June 2010, Maas was sacked as commentator after posting insults on Twitter about Sieneke, Joran van der Sloot and the Party for Freedom (PVV). After this, DJ Daniël Dekker, who had been commentating next to Maas, took over together with Jan Smit. In 2014, Maas returned, now himself replacing Dekker, as commentator together with Smit. Sander Lantinga replaced Smit for 2021 due to Smit hosting the main contest. In 2024, Smit stepped down as commentator and was replaced by Jacqueline Govaert.

The broadcast of the 2000 contest on Nederland 2 was halted an hour after it commenced due to the Enschede fireworks disaster, which had taken place a few hours before. The points awarded by the Netherlands were taken from the back-up jury vote, as there was no televote after the program was cut short.

=== Television ===
Television broadcasts and commentators
Year	Broadcaster	Channel(s)	Commentator(s)	Ref.
1956	NTS	NTS	Piet te Nuyl Jr.	
1957	NTS	NTS	Piet te Nuyl Jr.	
1958	NTS	NTS	Siebe van der Zee	
1959	NTS	NTS	Piet te Nuyl Jr.	
1960	NTS	NTS	Piet te Nuyl Jr.	
1961	NTS	NTS	Piet te Nuyl Jr.	
1962	NTS	NTS	Willem Duys	
1963	NTS	NTS	Willem Duys	
1964	NTS	NTS	Ageeth Scherphuis	
1965	NTS	Nederland 1	Teddy Scholten	
1966	NTS	Nederland 1	Teddy Scholten	
1967	NTS	Nederland 1	Leo Nelissen	
1968	NTS	Nederland 1	Elles Berger	
1969	NTS	Nederland 1	Pim Jacobs	
1970	NOS	Nederland 1	Pim Jacobs	
1971	NOS	Nederland 1	Pim Jacobs	
1972	NOS	Nederland 1	Pim Jacobs	
1973	NOS	Nederland 1	Pim Jacobs	
1974	NOS	Nederland 2	Willem Duys	
1975	NOS	Nederland 2	Willem Duys	
1976	NOS	Nederland 2	Willem Duys	
1977	NOS	Nederland 2	Ati Dijckmeester	
1978	NOS	Nederland 2	Willem Duys	
1979	NOS	Nederland 2	Willem Duys	
1980	NOS	Nederland 2	Pim Jacobs	
1981	NOS	Nederland 1	Pim Jacobs	
1982	NOS	Nederland 2	Pim Jacobs	
1983	NOS	Nederland 1	Willem Duys	
1984	NOS	Nederland 1	Ivo Niehe	
1985	NOS	Olympus (Note: Deferred broadcast on the following day at 10:00 (CEST).)	Gerrit den Braber	
1986	Veronica	Nederland 1	Leo van der Goot	
1987	NOS	Nederland 1	Willem van Beusekom	
1988	NOS	Nederland 3	Willem van Beusekom	
1989	NOS	Nederland 3	Willem van Beusekom	
1990	NOS	Nederland 3	Willem van Beusekom	
1992	NOS	Nederland 3	Willem van Beusekom	
1993	NOS	Nederland 3	Willem van Beusekom	
1994	NOS	Nederland 3	Willem van Beusekom	
1995	NOS	Nederland 3	Paul de Leeuw	
1996	NOS	TV2	Willem van Beusekom	
1997	NOS	TV2	Willem van Beusekom	
1998	NOS	TV2	Willem van Beusekom	
1999	NOS	TV2	Willem van Beusekom	
2000	NOS	TV2 (Note: Broadcast was suspended after the performance of the Spanish entry to provide emergency news coverage of the Enschede fireworks disaster.)	Willem van Beusekom	
2001	NOS	Nederland 2	Willem van Beusekom	
2002	NOS	Nederland 2	Willem van Beusekom	
2003	NOS	Nederland 2	Willem van Beusekom	
2004	NOS	Nederland 2	Willem van Beusekom and Cornald Maas	
2005	NOS	Nederland 2	Willem van Beusekom and Cornald Maas	
2006	NOS	Nederland 2	Semi-final: Cornald Maas; Final: Cornald Maas and Paul de Leeuw	
2007	NOS	Nederland 1	Semi-final: Cornald Maas; Final: Cornald Maas and Paul de Leeuw	
2008	NOS	Nederland 1	Cornald Maas	
2009	NOS	Nederland 1	Cornald Maas	
2010	TROS	Nederland 1	Cornald Maas and Daniël Dekker	
2011	TROS	Nederland 1	Daniël Dekker and Jan Smit	
2012	TROS	Nederland 1	Daniël Dekker and Jan Smit	
2013	TROS	Nederland 1, BVN	Daniël Dekker and Jan Smit	
2014	AVROTROS	Nederland 1, BVN	Cornald Maas and Jan Smit (Note: The broadcast of the second semi-final in 2016 also featured Douwe Bob as a guest commentator.)	
2015	AVROTROS	NPO 1, BVN	Cornald Maas and Jan Smit	
2016	AVROTROS	NPO 1, BVN	Cornald Maas and Jan Smit	
2017	AVROTROS	NPO 1, BVN	Cornald Maas and Jan Smit	
2018	AVROTROS	NPO 1	Cornald Maas and Jan Smit	
2019	AVROTROS	NPO 1	Cornald Maas and Jan Smit	
2021	AVROTROS	NPO 1, BVN	Cornald Maas and Sander Lantinga	
2021	AVROTROS	NPO 1 Extra	Dutch Sign Language interpretation	
2021	AVROTROS	NPO Zappelin Extra	Audio description	
2022	AVROTROS	NPO 1, BVN	Cornald Maas and Jan Smit	
2023	AVROTROS	NPO 1, BVN	Cornald Maas and Jan Smit	
2024	AVROTROS	NPO 1, BVN	Cornald Maas and Jacqueline Govaert	
2025	AVROTROS	NPO 1, BVN	Cornald Maas	
2026	NOS and NTR	NPO 1, BVN	Henry Schut and Jeroen Kijk in de Vegte	
2027	NOS	NPO 1	TBA	

=== Radio ===
Table key
◇	Broadcast cancelled

Radio broadcasts and commentators
Year	Broadcaster	Channel(s)	Commentator(s)	Ref.
1958	VARA	Hilversum 1	Siebe van der Zee	
1959	VARA	Hilversum 1 (Note: Deferred broadcast at 22:00 (CET).)	Aad Bos	
1960	KRO	Hilversum 2 (Note: Deferred broadcast at 22:40 (CET).)	Unknown	
1961	VARA	Hilversum 1	Coen Serré	
1962	AVRO	Hilversum 2 (Note: Deferred and shortened broadcast at 23:00 (CET).)	Unknown	
1963	VARA	Hilversum 1	Coen Serré	
1964	VARA	Hilversum 2	Unknown	
1965	KRO	Hilversum 2	Unknown	
1966	KRO	Hilversum 1	Unknown	
1967	VARA	Hilversum 1 (Note: Ten-minute summary broadcast at 23:45 (CET).)	Unknown	
1976	NOS	Hilversum 3	Unknown	
1980	VARA	Hilversum 1	Willem van Beusekom	
1996	NCRV	Radio 2	Hijlco Span	
1997	NCRV	Radio 2	Unknown	
1998	NCRV	Radio 2	Unknown	
2000	NCRV	Radio 2 (Note: Broadcast was suspended after the performance of the Danish entry to provide emergency news coverage of the Enschede fireworks disaster.)	Hijlco Span	
2000	TROS ◇	Radio 3FM ◇ (Note: Broadcast was cancelled due to the Enschede fireworks disaster.)	André van Duin and Ferry de Groot ◇ (Note: As the characters Dik Voormekaar and Mr. De Groot.)	
2001	NCRV	Radio 2	Unknown	
2001	VARA	Radio 3FM	Cornald Maas and Paul de Leeuw	
2002	Radio 2 (Note: The programme was broadcast directly by Radio 2, rather than one of the public service broadcasters.)	Radio 2	Unknown	
2003	Radio 2	Radio 2	Hijlco Span and Ron Stoeltie	
2004	Radio 2	Radio 2	Hijlco Span and Ron Stoeltie	
2005	Radio 2	Radio 2	Hijlco Span and Ron Stoeltie	
2006	Radio 2	Radio 2	Hijlco Span, Ron Stoeltie and Eric van Tijn	
2015	AVROTROS	NPO Radio 2	Cornald Maas and Jan Smit	
2019	AVROTROS	NPO Radio 2 (Note: Only the final was broadcast.)	Wouter van der Goes and Frank van 't Hof	
2021	AVROTROS	NPO Radio 2	Wouter van der Goes and Frank van 't Hof	
2022	AVROTROS	NPO Radio 2	Frank van 't Hof and Jeroen Kijk in de Vegte	
2023	AVROTROS	NPO Radio 2	Wouter van der Goes and Frank van 't Hof	
2024	AVROTROS	NPO Radio 2	Carolien Borgers and Splinter Chabot	
2025	AVROTROS	NPO Radio 2	Carolien Borgers	

=== Special shows ===
Show	Date	Broadcaster	Channel(s)	Commentator(s)	Ref.
Songs of Europe	7 September 1981	TROS	Nederland 2	No commentator	
Congratulations: 50 Years of the Eurovision Song Contest	22 October 2005	TROS	Nederland 2	Willem van Beusekom	
Eurovision: Europe Shine a Light	16 May 2020	AVROTROS	NPO 1	Cornald Maas	

== Photo gallery ==
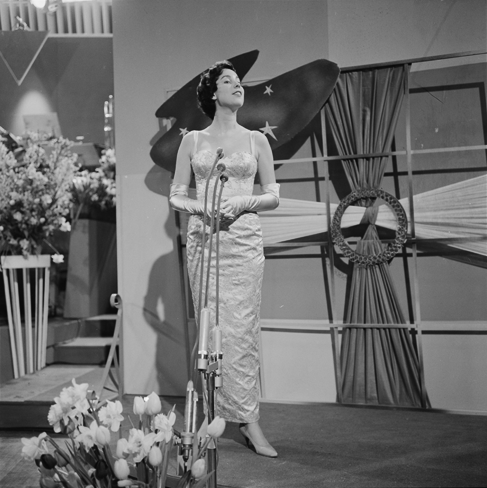
Corry Brokken in Hilversum (1958)

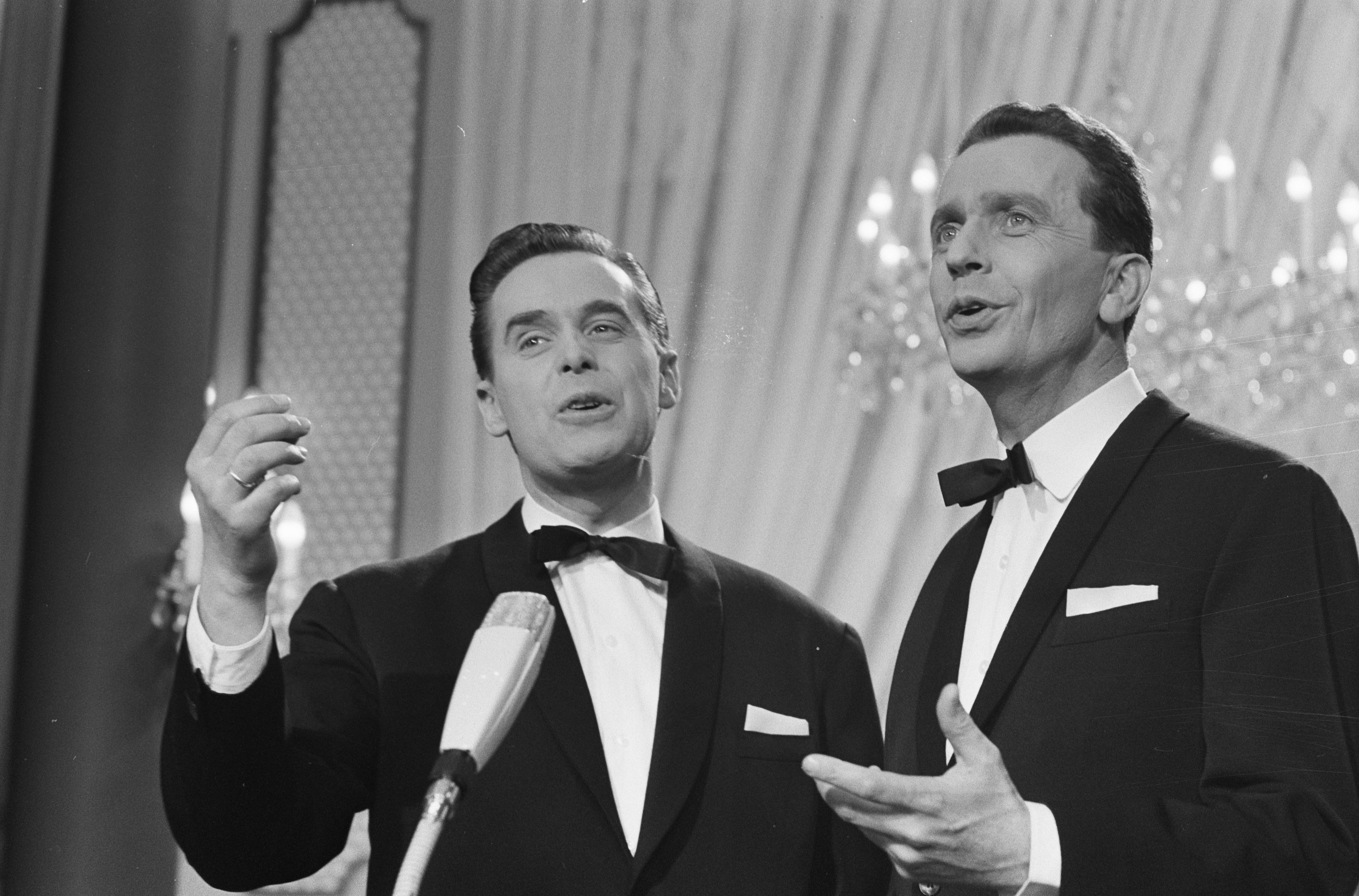
De Spelbrekers in Luxembourg City (1962)

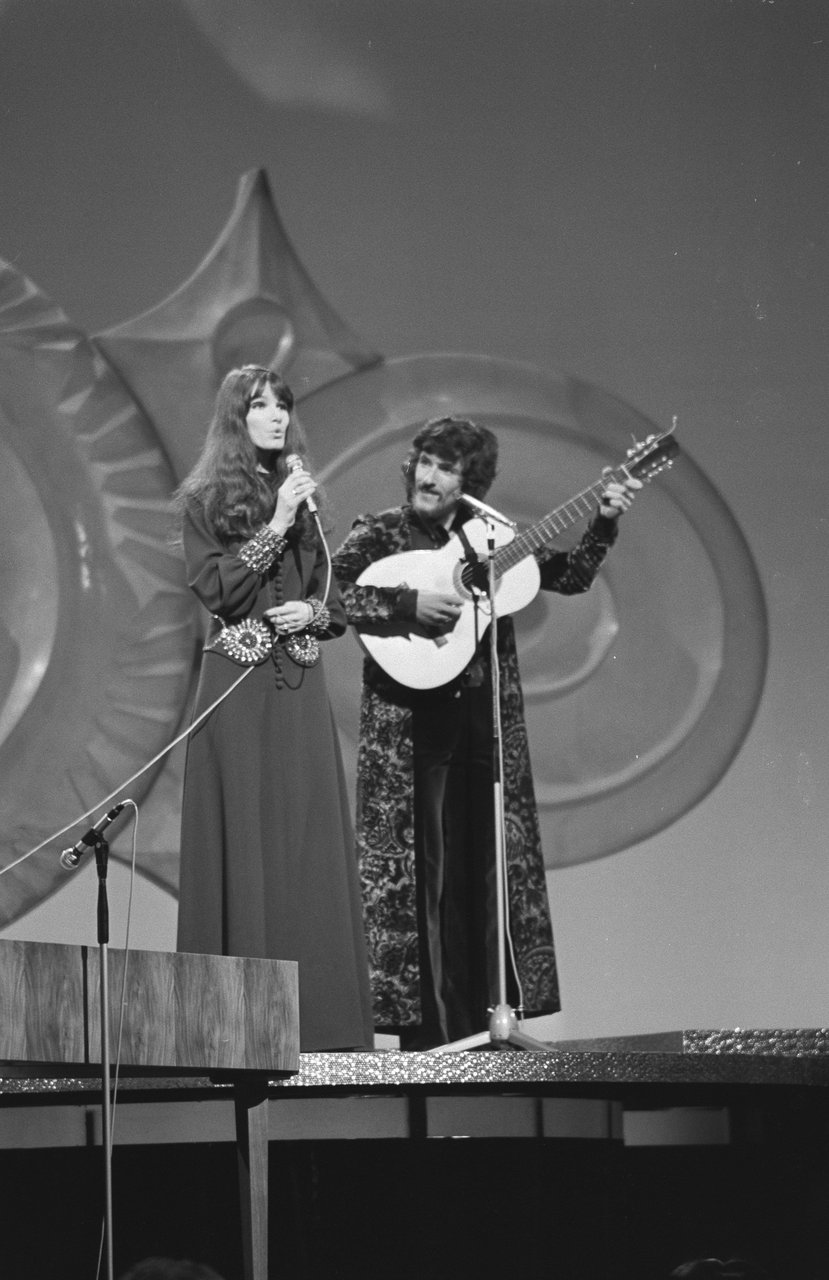
Saskia and Serge in Dublin (1971)

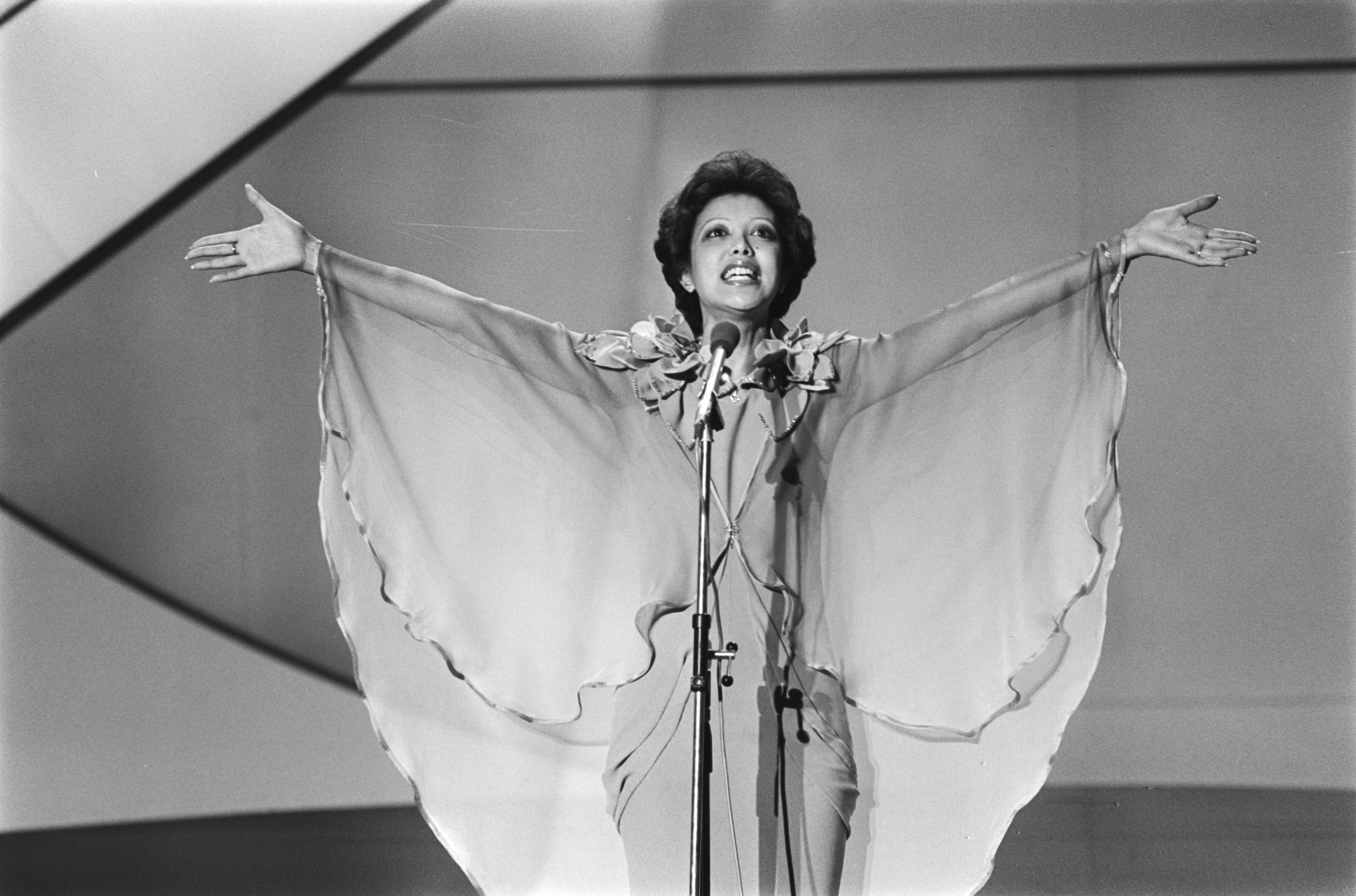
Sandra Reemer in The Hague (1976)

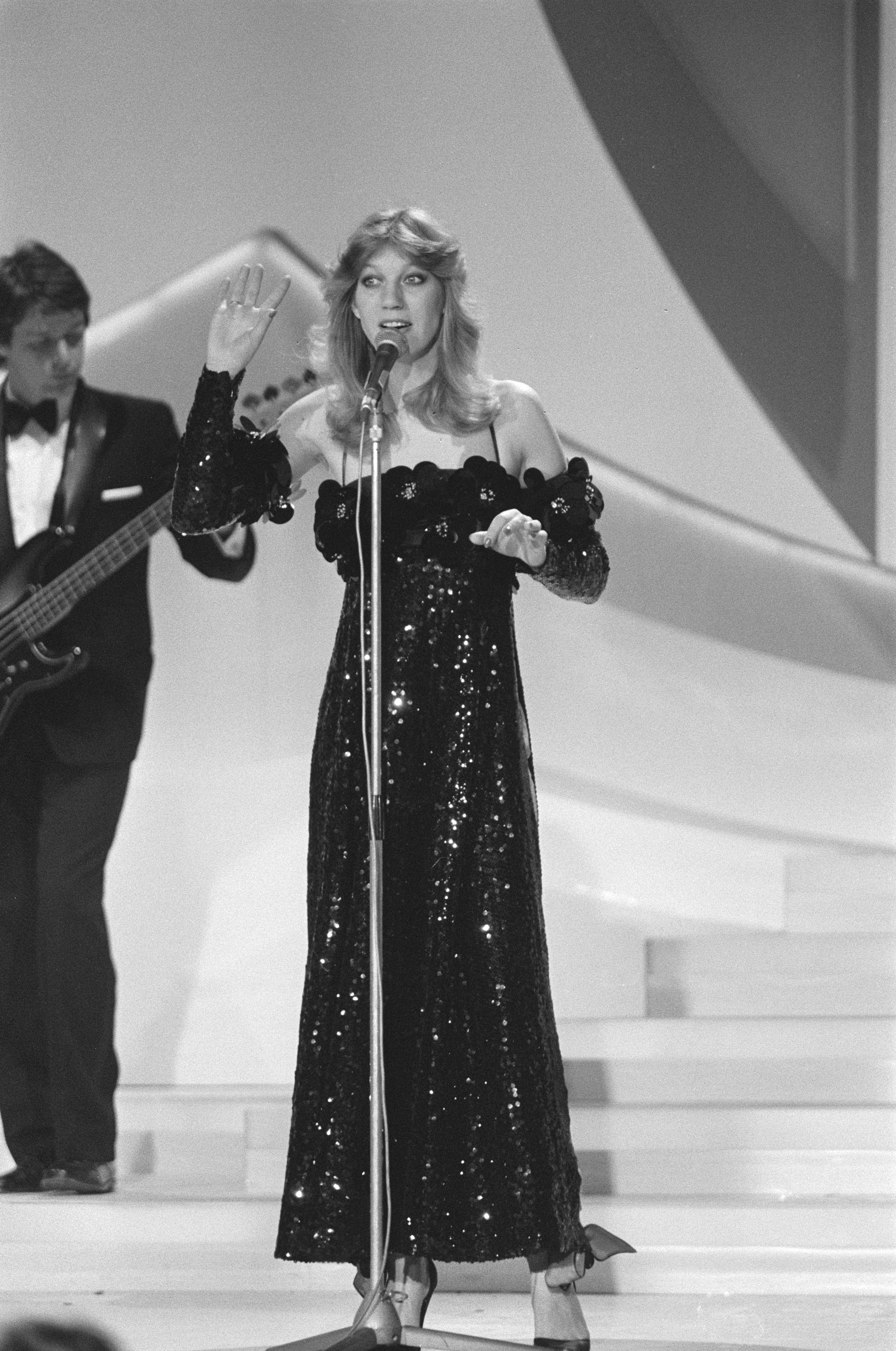
Maggie MacNeal in The Hague (1980)

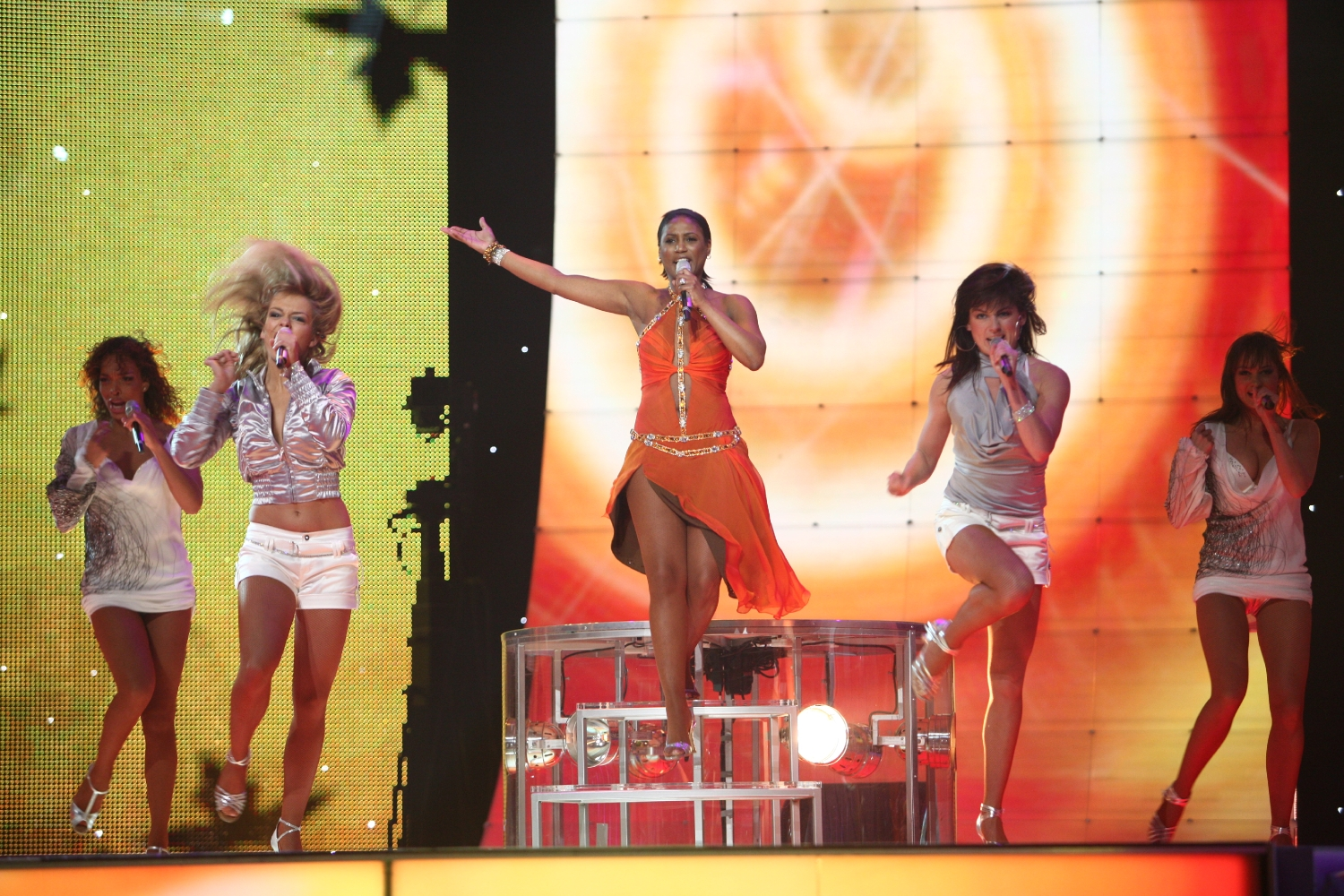
Edsilia Rombley in Helsinki (2007)

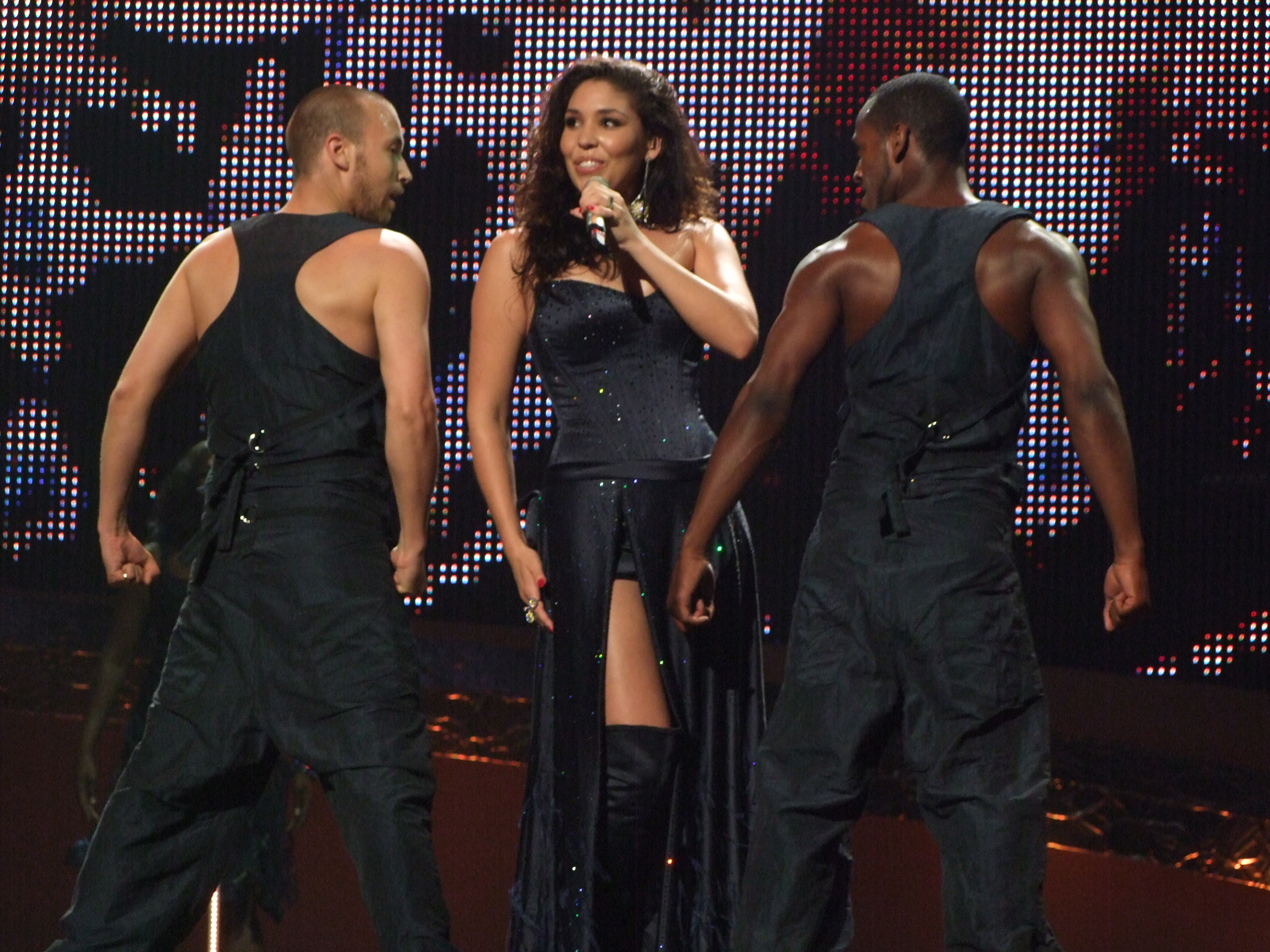
Hind in Belgrade (2008)

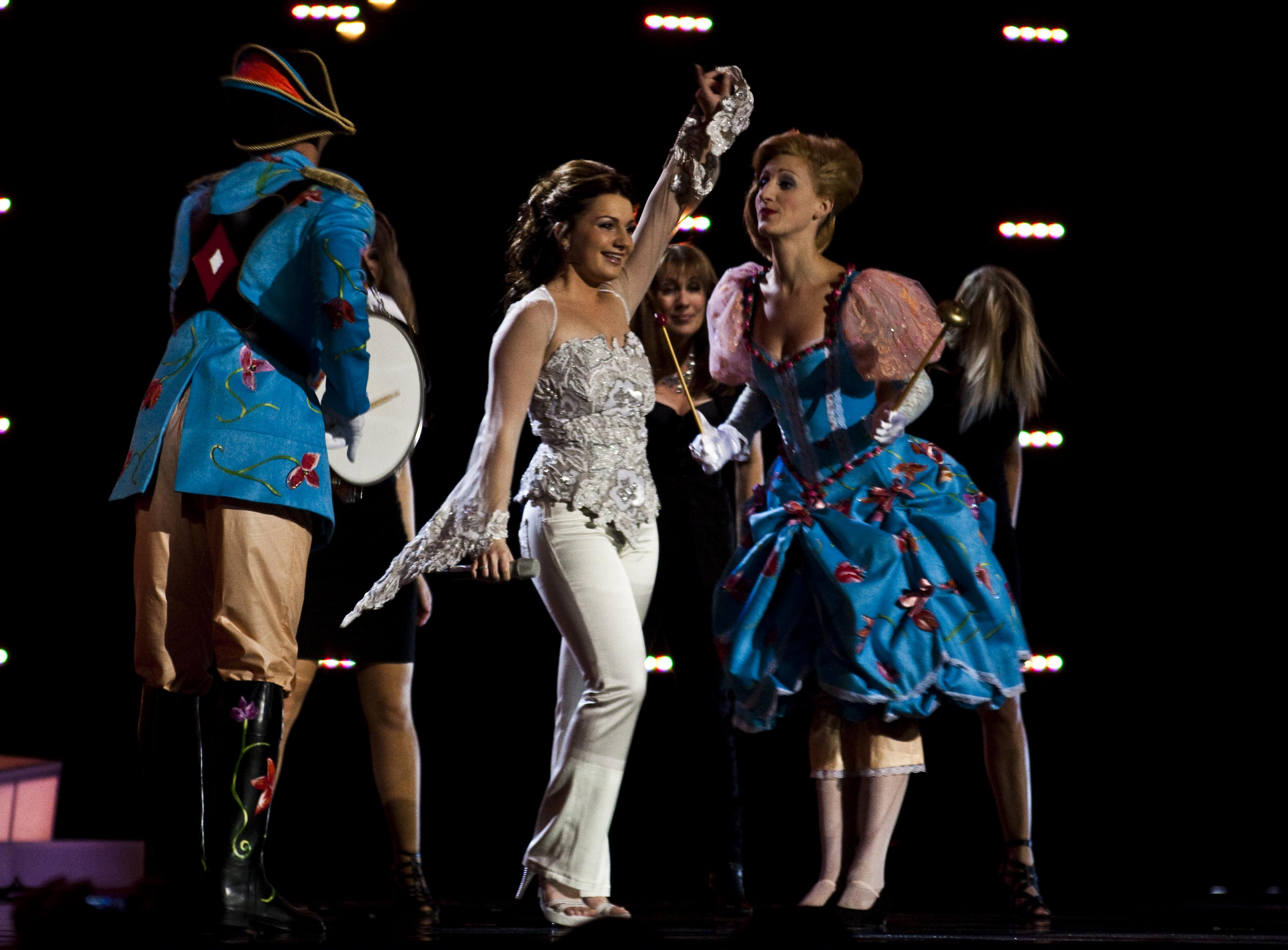
Sieneke in Oslo (2010)

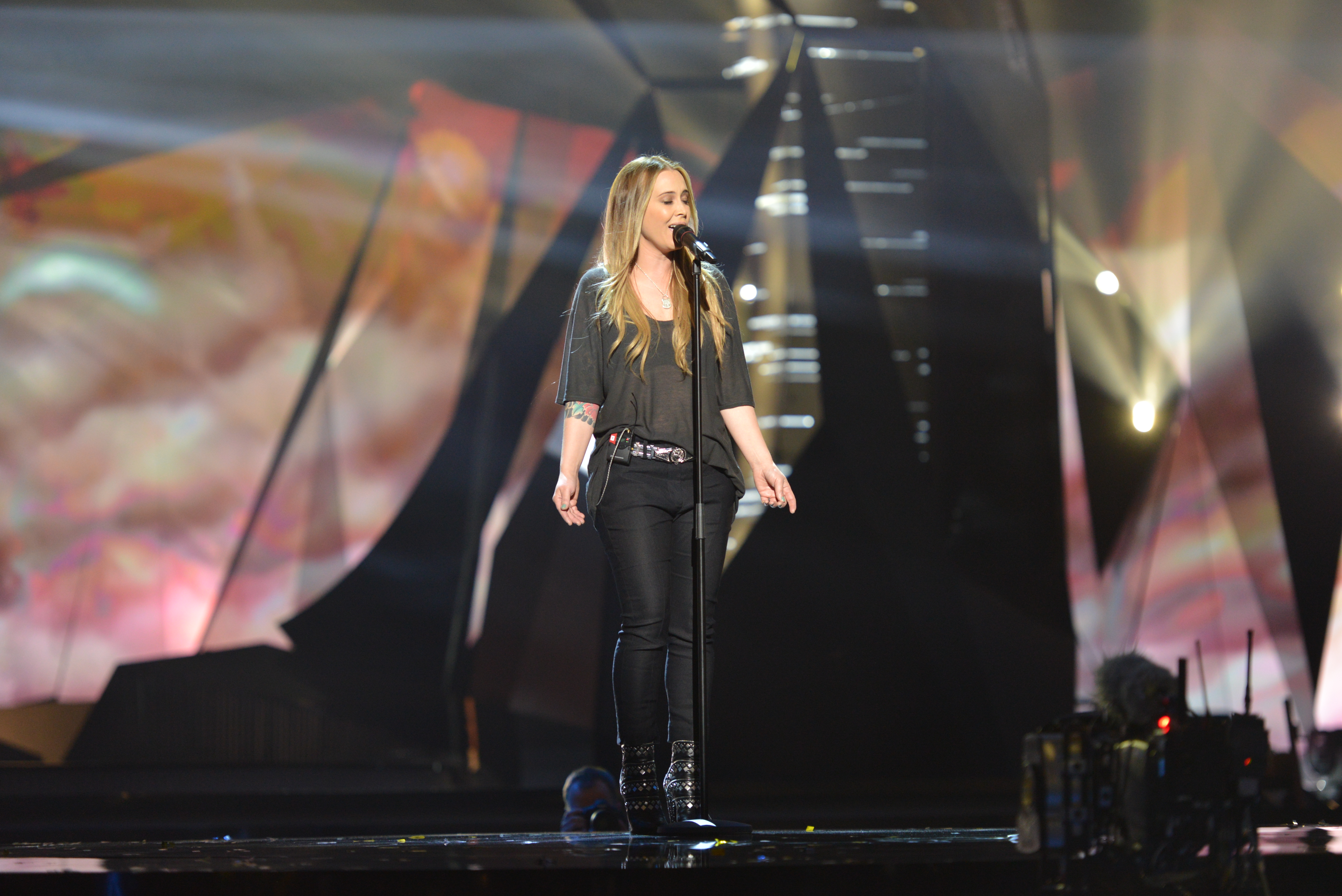
Anouk in Malmö (2013)

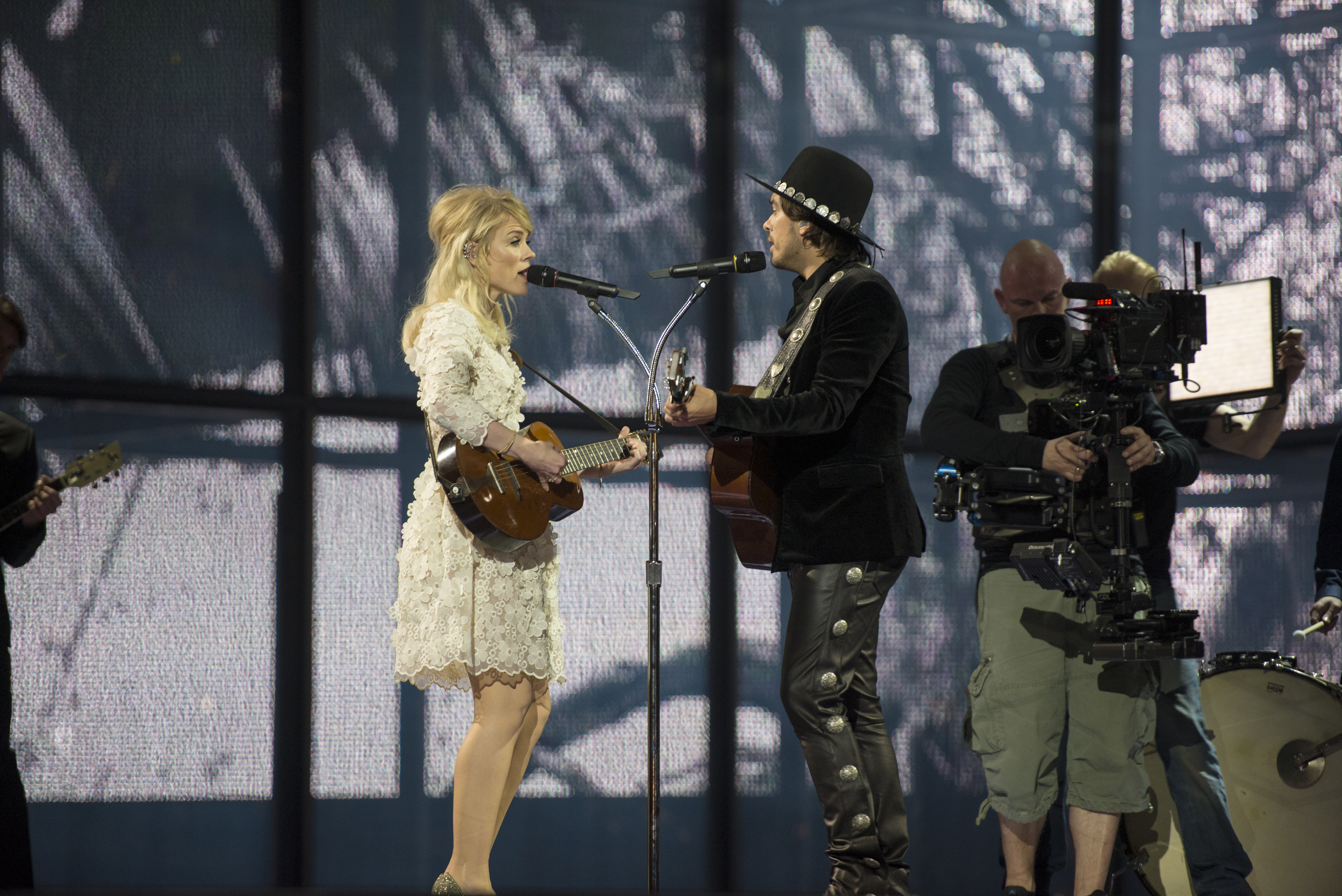
The Common Linnets in Copenhagen (2014)

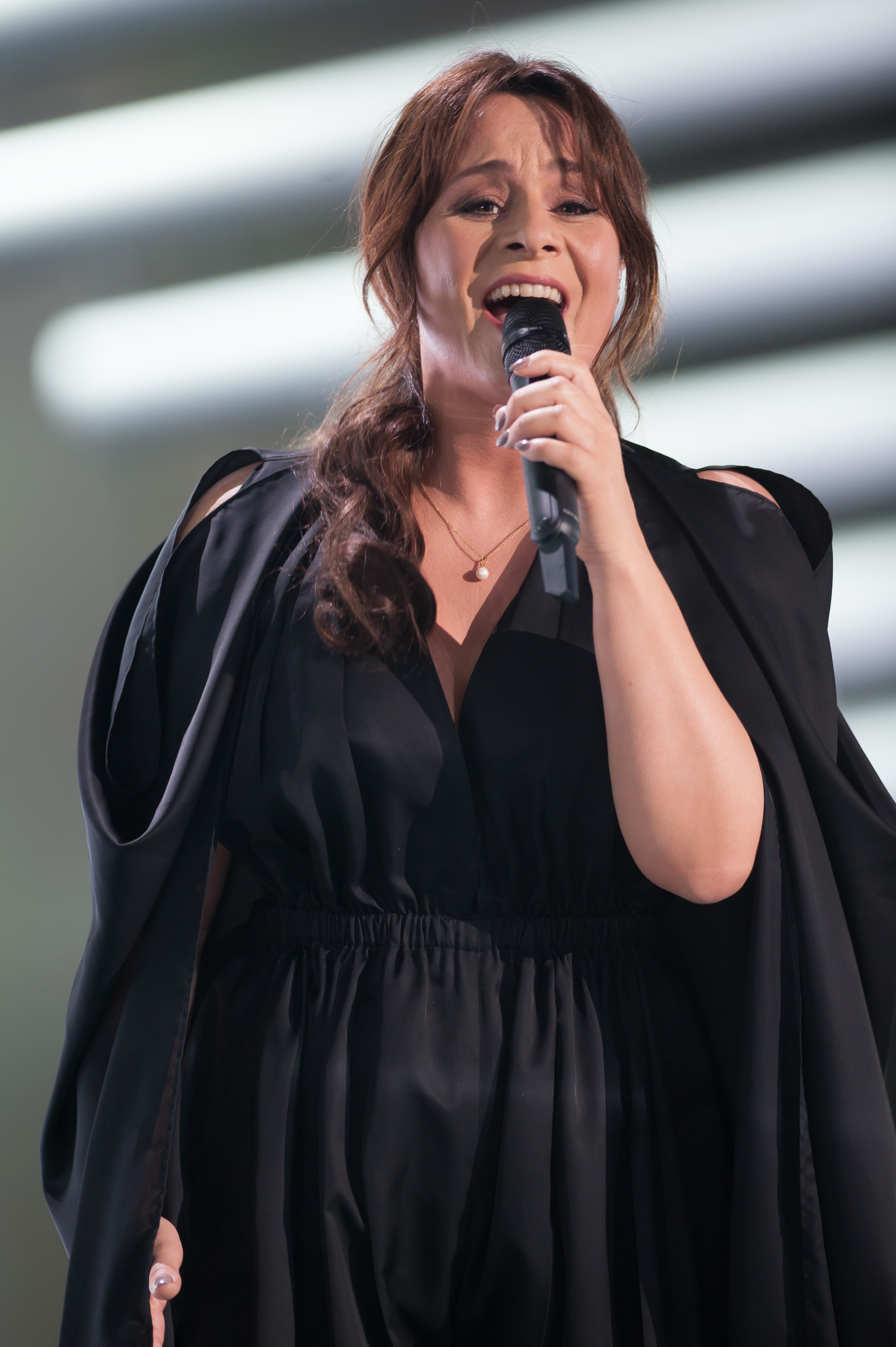
Trijntje Oosterhuis in Vienna (2015)

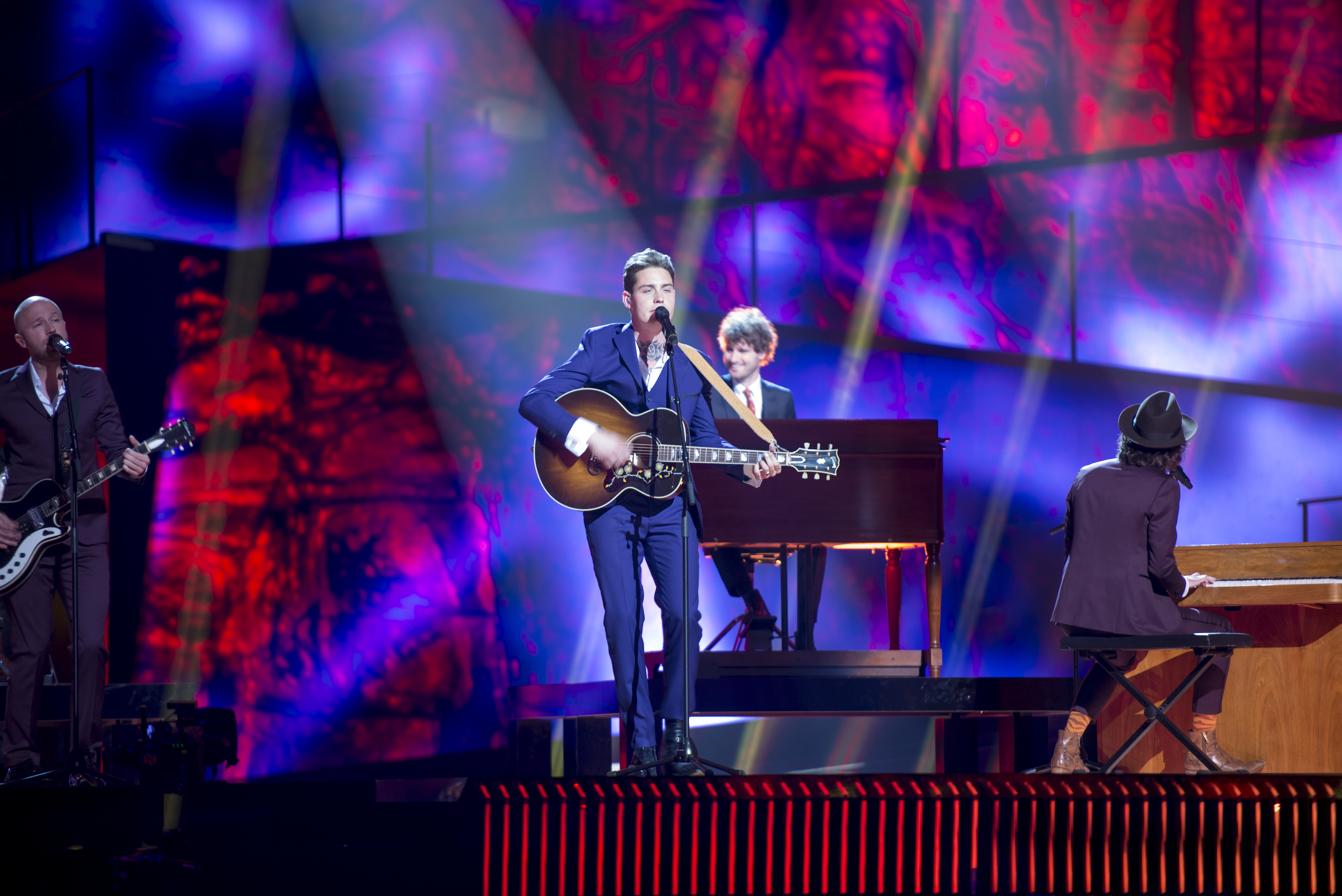
Douwe Bob in Stockholm (2016)

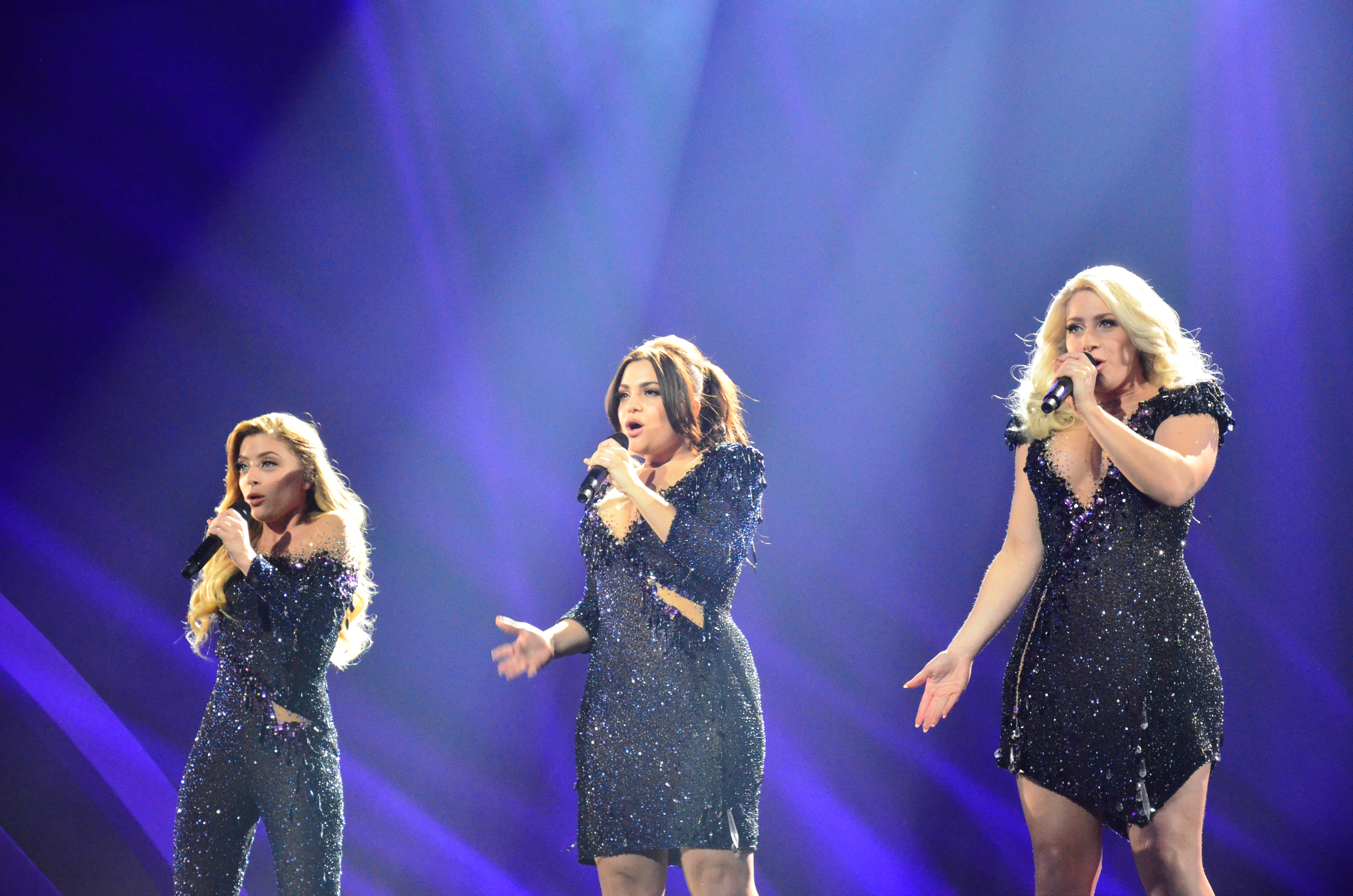
Ogene in Kyiv (2017)

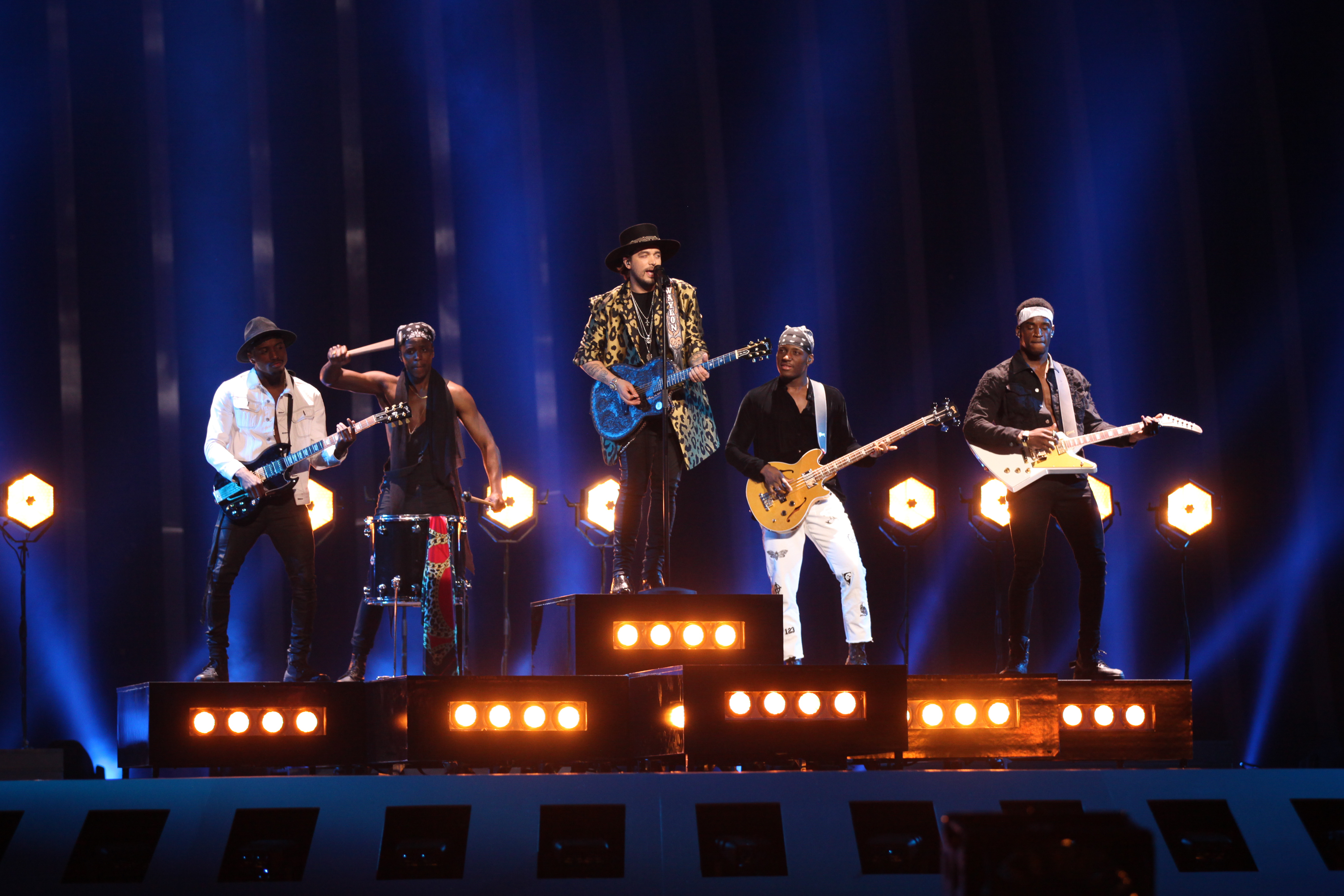
Waylon in Lisbon (2018)

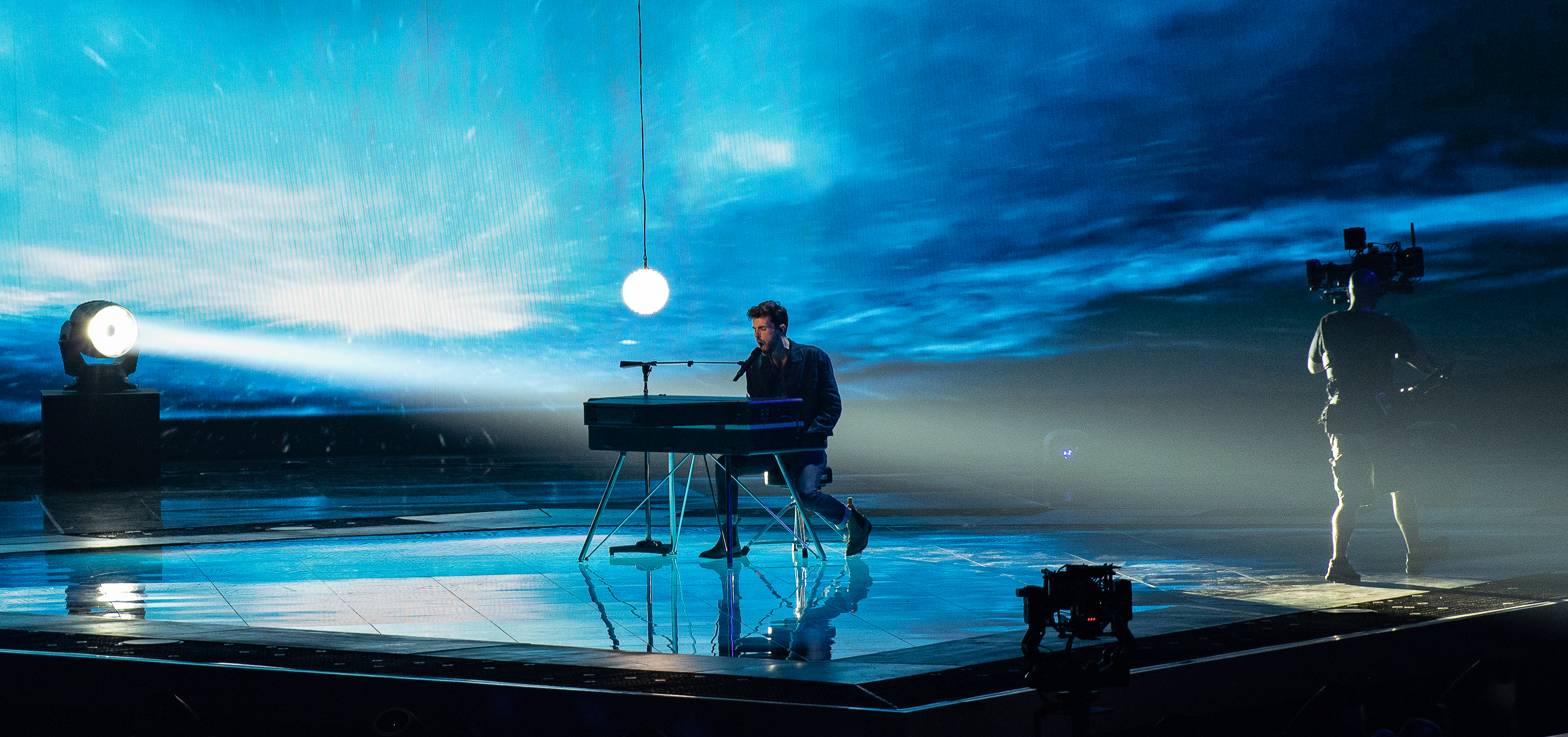
Duncan Laurence in Tel Aviv (2019)

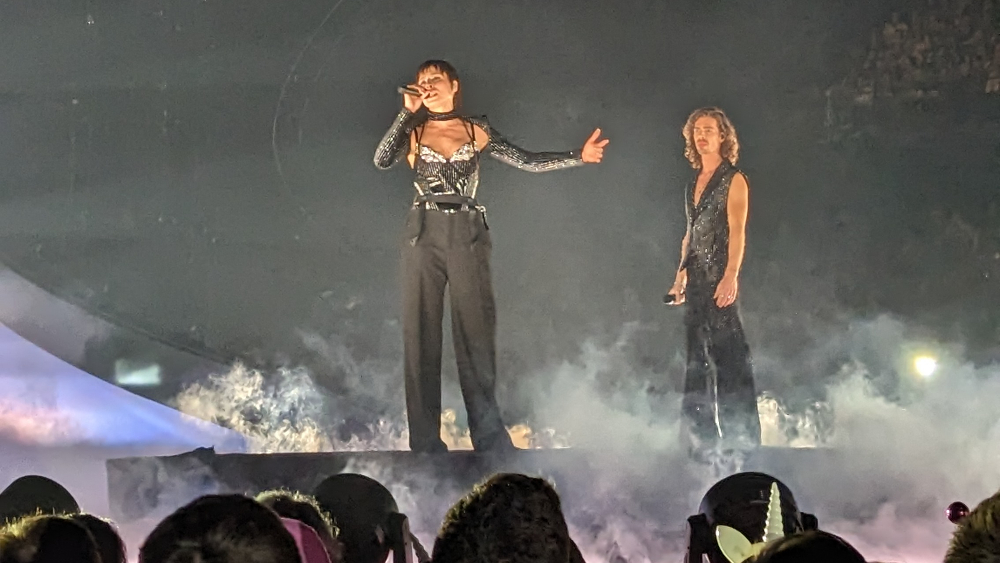
Mia Nicolai and Dion Cooper in Liverpool (2023)

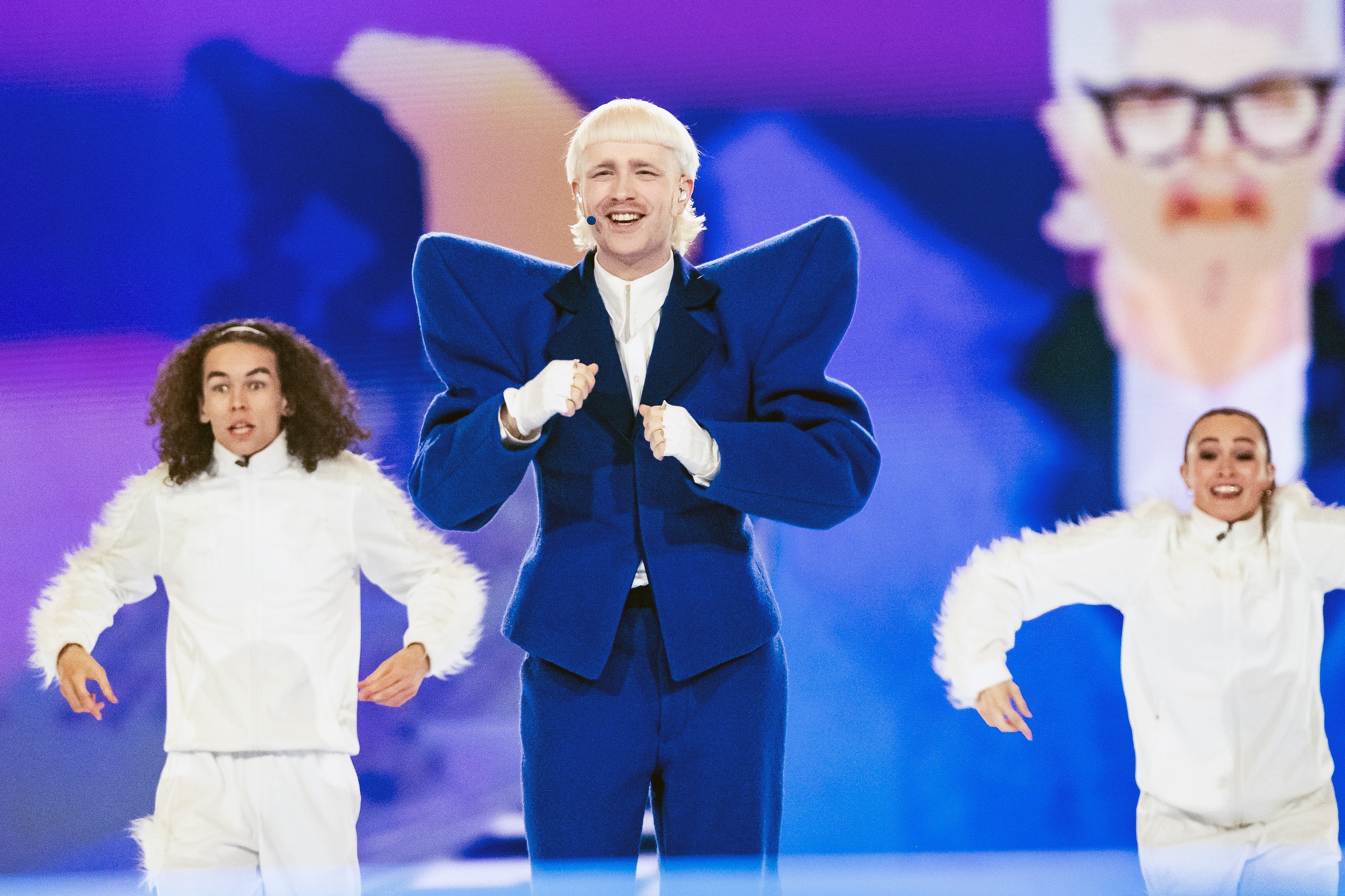
Joost Klein in Malmö (2024)

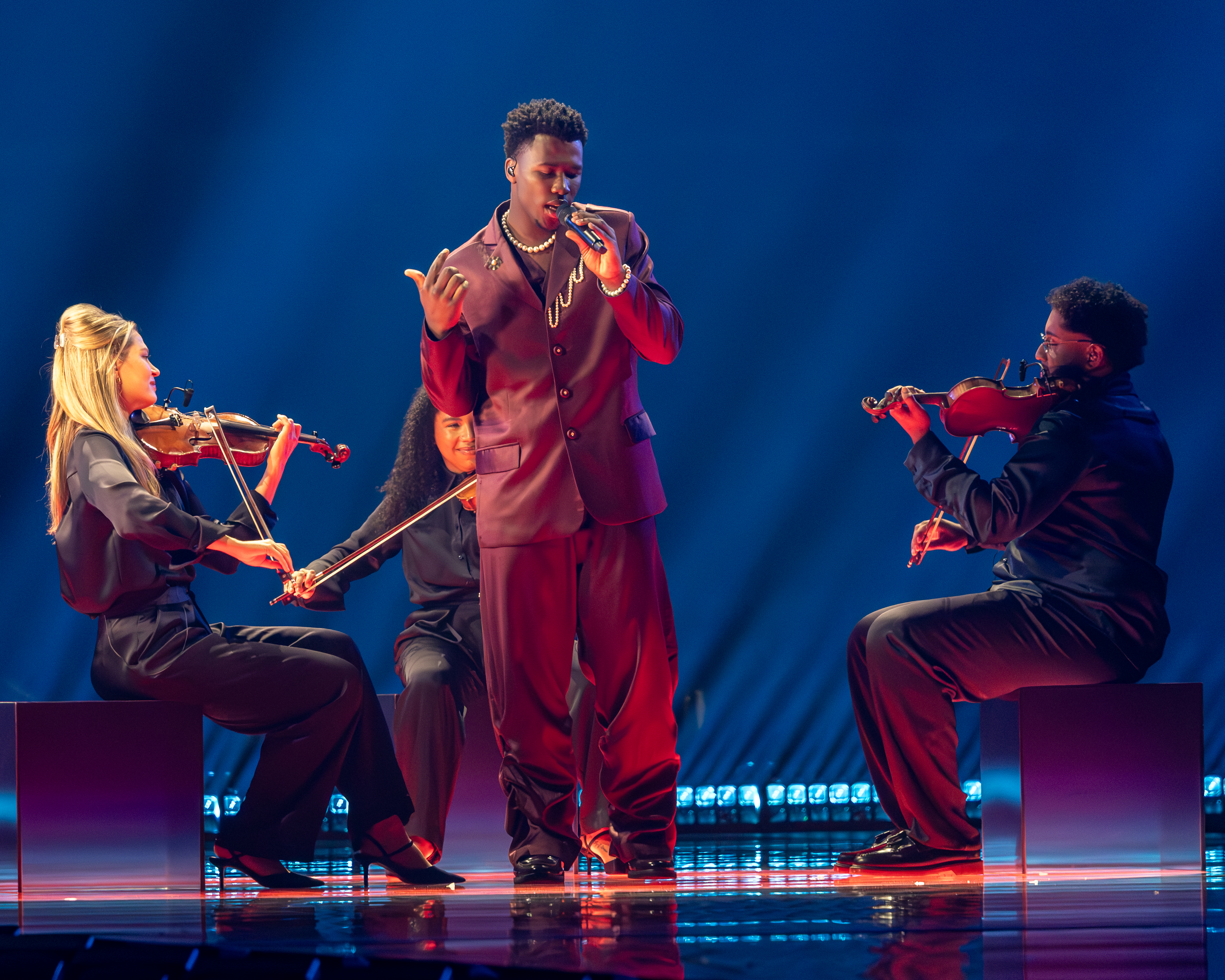
Claude in Basel (2025)

== See also ==
- Nationaal Songfestival
- Netherlands in the Junior Eurovision Song Contest – Junior version of the Eurovision Song Contest
- Regio Songfestival
