= Mia Nicolai =

Dutch singer and songwriter

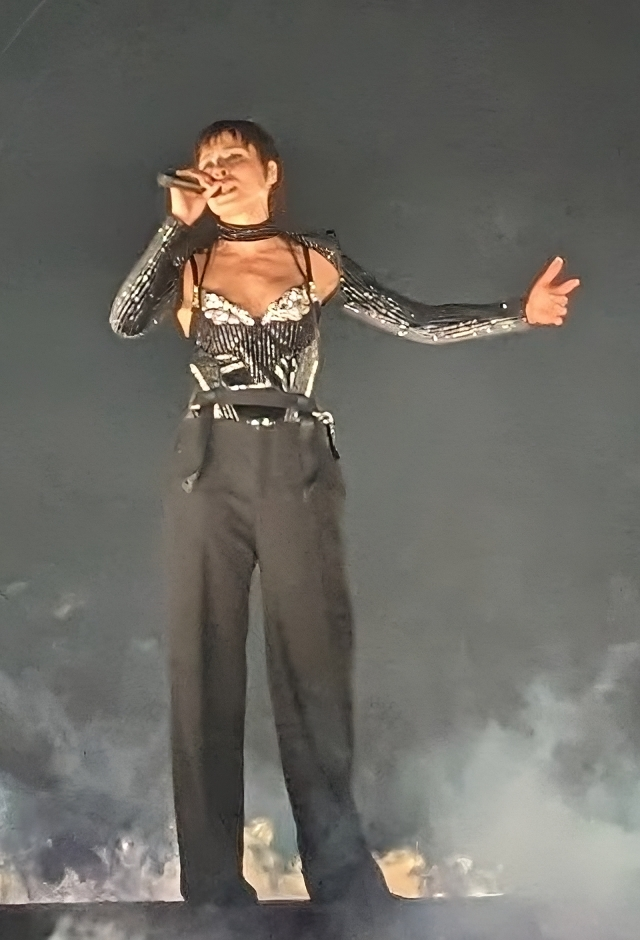
- Mia Nicolai in 2023

Background information
- Born: Michaja Antonina Nicolaï; 7 March 1996 (age 30); Amsterdam, Netherlands
- Occupations: Singer; songwriter; actress
- Years active: 2018–present
- Labels: New Ams; Red Papula

Michaja Antonina Nicolaï (Dutch: [ˈmixaːjaː ˈnikoːlɑi]; born 7 March 1996), known professionally as Mia Nicolai, is a Dutch singer, songwriter and actress. She represented the Netherlands in the Eurovision Song Contest 2023 alongside Dion Cooper with the song "Burning Daylight".

== Early life ==
Michaja Nicolaï was born on 7 March 1996 in Amsterdam as the second daughter of lawyer Peter Nicolaï and Russian-born musician and composer Marynka Nicolaï-Krylova. She started taking drama and ballet classes at the age of three, which, according to herself, sparked an interest in music. She later started taking piano and violin lessons.

== Career ==
=== 2018–2022: First singles ===
In 2018, Mia Nicolai released her first single, a cover of American composer Glenn Miller's "At Last". In 2020, she released "Set Me Free" and "Mutual Needs", of which the latter was featured on DJ Zane Lowe's radio show. In 2021, she released two singles, "People Pleaser" and "Dream Go".

=== 2023: Eurovision Song Contest ===
On 1 November 2022, the Dutch broadcaster AVROTROS announced that Nicolai would represent the Netherlands in the Eurovision Song Contest 2023, alongside Dion Cooper. Nicolai had met Cooper in 2020 when fellow Dutch Eurovision entrant and winner of the 2019 edition, Duncan Laurence, along with Laurence's partner Jordan Garfield, paired the two up. Nicolai and Cooper performed in the first semi-final, but failed to qualify for the final.

== Personal life and artistry ==
Nicolai has lived in London, Melbourne and New York City, before settling in Los Angeles in 2022. She has cited English singer David Bowie as one of her main artistic influences.

== Discography ==
=== Studio albums ===
Title	Details
Sharing Space Among the Stars	Released: 7 November 2025; Label: Superglue; Formats: Digital download, streaming

=== Singles ===
==== As lead artist ====
Title	Year	Peak chart positions		Album or EP
Title	Year	NLD (100)	NLD (40)	Album or EP
"At Last"	2018	—	—	Non-album singles
"Set Me Free"	2020	—	—	Non-album singles
"Mutual Needs"	2020	—	—	Non-album singles
"People Pleaser"	2021	—	—	Non-album singles
"Dream Go"	2021	—	—	Non-album singles
"Loop"	2022	—	—	Non-album singles
"Burning Daylight" (with Dion Cooper)	2023	42	21	Non-album singles
"Stuck"	2023	—	—	Non-album singles
"Chasing Lullabies"	2025	—	—	Sharing Space Among the Stars
"Spend the Night"	2025	—	—	Sharing Space Among the Stars
"Drowning"	2026	—	—	Non-album single
"—" denotes a recording that did not chart or was not released in that territory.

==== As featured artist ====
Title	Year	Album or EP
"Time Without Ya" (Kid Gloves featuring Mia Nicolai)	2020	Non-album single

=== Other collaborations ===
Title	Year	Album or EP
"Issue" (Bob Junior featuring Mia Nicolai)	2025	Friends, Vol. 2

== Songwriting discography ==
=== Eurovision Song Contest entries ===
Year	Country	Song	Artist	Semi-final		Final		Co-written with
Year	Country	Song	Artist	Place	Points	Place	Points	Co-written with
2023	Netherlands	"Burning Daylight"	Mia Nicolai and Dion Cooper	13	7	DNQ		Duncan de Moor, Jordan Garfield, Dion Cuiper, Loek van der Grinten

==== National selection entries ====
Year	Country	Song	Artist	Result		Co-written with
Year	Country	Song	Artist	Place	Points	Co-written with
2023	Moldova	"When Love's Real"	Corina Ivanov	7	7	Mike Connaris

== Filmography ==
Year	Title	Role	Notes
2016	Adios Amigos	Prostitute	—
2016	Babatunde	Steffi	Short film
2018	Doris	Lunchroom girl	—
2021	Flikken Rotterdam	Tara Tereshchenko	Episode: "Rex"

Awards and achievements
Preceded by S10 with "De diepte"	Netherlands in the Eurovision Song Contest; 2023; With: Dion Cooper	Succeeded by Joost Klein with "Europapa"
