= Netherlands in the Eurovision Song Contest 2023 =

- Eurovision Song Contest 2023
- Participating broadcaster: AVROTROS
- Country: Netherlands
- Selection process: Internal selection
- Announcement date: Artist: 1 November 2022; Song: 1 March 2023

Competing entry
- Song: "Burning Daylight"
- Artist: Mia Nicolai and Dion Cooper
- Songwriters: Michaja Nicolaï; Dion Cuiper; Duncan de Moor; Jordan Garfield; Loek van der Grinten

Placement
- Semi-final result: Failed to qualify (13th)

Participation chronology

The Netherlands was represented at the Eurovision Song Contest 2023 with the song "Burning Daylight", written by Michaja Nicolaï, Dion Cuiper, Duncan de Moor, Jordan Garfield, and Loek van der Grinten, and performed by Nicolaï and Cuiper themselves as Mia Nicolai and Dion Cooper. The Dutch participating broadcaster, AVROTROS, internally selected its entry for the contest. Nicolai and Cooper's appointment as the Dutch representative was announced on 1 November 2022, while the song, "Burning Daylight", was presented to the public on 1 March 2023.

The Netherlands was drawn to compete in the first semi-final of the Eurovision Song Contest which took place on 9 May 2023. Performing during the show in position 14, "Burning Daylight" was not announced among the top 10 entries of the first semi-final and therefore did not qualify to compete in the final. It was later revealed that the Netherlands placed thirteenth out of the 15 participating countries in the semi-final with 7 points.

== Background ==
Prior to the 2023 contest, AVROTROS and its predecessor national broadcasters have participated in the Eurovision Song Contest representing the Netherlands sixty-two times since NTS début in 1956. They have won the contest five times: in 1957 with the song "Net als toen" performed by Corry Brokken; in 1959 with the song "'n Beetje" performed by Teddy Scholten; in 1969 as one of four countries to tie for first place with "De troubadour" performed by Lenny Kuhr; in 1975 with "Ding-a-dong" performed by the group Teach-In; and in 2019 with "Arcade" performed by Duncan Laurence. Following the introduction of semi-finals for the 2004 contest, the Netherlands has featured in nine finals. The country ended last on five occasions, most recently in the second semi-final of the 2011 contest. In in 2022, the country qualified for the final and finished 11th with "De diepte" by S10.

As part of its duties as participating broadcaster, AVROTROS organises the selection of its entry in the Eurovision Song Contest and broadcasts the event in the country. The Dutch broadcaster has used various methods to select its entry in the past, such as the Nationaal Songfestival, a live televised national final to choose the performer, song or both to compete at Eurovision. However, internal selections have also been held on numerous occasions. Since 2013, the Dutch broadcaster has internally selected its entry for the contest. In 2013, the internal selection of "Birds" by Anouk managed to take the country to the final for the first time in eight years and placed ninth overall. In 2014, the internal selection of "Calm After the Storm" by the Common Linnets qualified the country to the final once again and placed second, while the internal selection of Duncan Laurence in 2019 managed to achieve a Dutch victory for the first time since 1975. For 2023, AVROTROS opted to continue selecting its entry through an internal selection.

== Before Eurovision ==
=== Internal selection ===
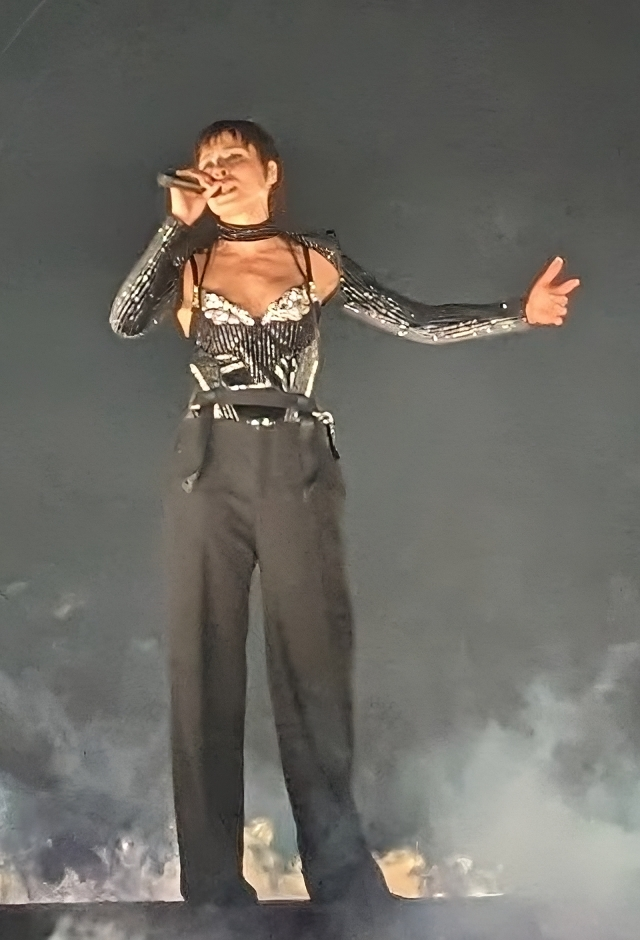
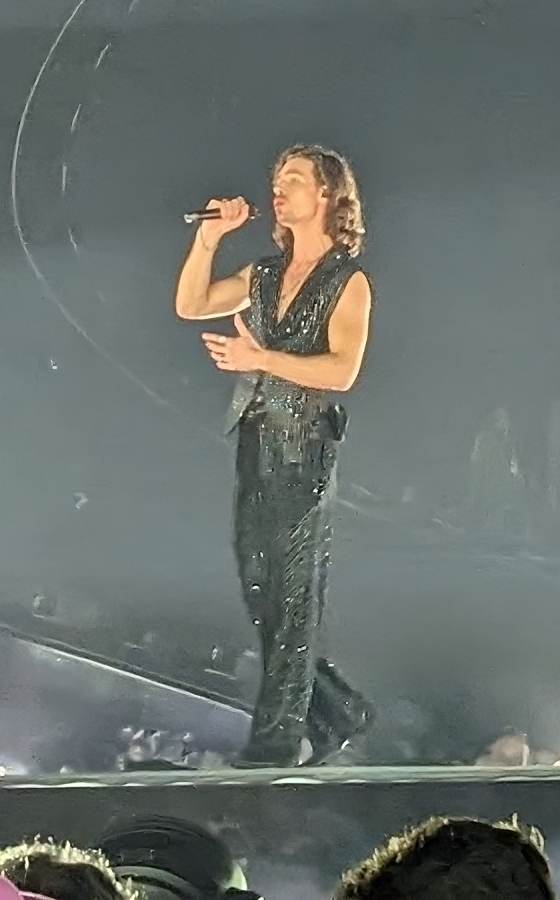
Mia Nicolai and Dion Cooper were internally selected to represent the Netherlands in the Eurovision Song Contest 2023

Following S10's eleventh place in the final in 2022 with "De diepte", AVROTROS revealed that they would continue to internally select both the artist and song for the Eurovision Song Contest. A submission period was opened by the broadcaster on 17 May 2022 where artists and composers were able to submit their entries until 31 August 2022. Each artist and songwriter was able to submit a maximum of three songs and entries with "a contemporary, but in any case authentic sound" were preferred. The broadcaster also sought out "a personal song in a distinctive way, in any genre, and if possible a personal story". Over 300 submissions were received by the broadcaster at the closing of the deadline.

On 1 November 2022, AVROTROS announced that they had selected singers Mia Nicolai and Dion Cooper to represent the Netherlands at the 2023 contest. The selection of Nicolai and Cooper as the Dutch representative occurred through the decision of a selection commission consisting of AVROTROS general director Eric van Stade, television host and author Cornald Maas, singer and television host Jan Smit and radio DJs Sander Lantinga, Carolien Borgers and Hila Noorzai. In regards to their selection as the Dutch entrants, the duo stated: "The Eurovision Song Contest is the place where people can see what you have to offer as an artist. After all these years of hard work, translating our feelings into music, this is a great opportunity to tell our story on such a large scale. It feels fantastic and a little unreal that the AVROTROS selection committee has chosen our song, but we're ready to share something really positive with Europe." It was also revealed that 2019 Eurovision winner Duncan Laurence had written the selected song together with Jordan Garfield.

On 1 March 2023, Mia Nicolai and Dion Cooper's Eurovision entry, "Burning Daylight", was presented to the public during a press conference that took place at Remastered Rotterdam. The song was premiered at the same time during the NPO 1 programme Khalid en Sophie, hosted by Khalid Kasem and Sophie Hilbrand, and the NPO Radio 2 programme Wout2day, hosted by Bart Arens. The official video for the song, filmed at the ReadySet Studios in Amsterdam using virtual production and directed by Gregory Samson, was released on the same day. "Burning Daylight" was written by Mia Nicolai and Dion Cooper together with Duncan Laurence, Jordan Garfield and Loek van der Grinten.

=== Promotion ===
Mia Nicolai and Dion Cooper specifically promoted "Burning Daylight" as the Dutch Eurovision entry on 8 April 2023 by performing during the PrePartyES event, which was held at the Sala La Riviera venue in Madrid, Spain and hosted by Victor Escudero, SuRie and Ruslana. On 8 April, Nicolai and Cooper performed during the Eurovision in Concert event which was held at the AFAS Live venue in Amsterdam and hosted by Cornald Maas and Hila Noorzai. On 28 April, the duo performed "Burning Daylight" during the NPO 1 programme Khalid en Sophie.

==== Live performance controversy ====
Following Nicolai and Cooper's performance at PrePartyES, multiple Dutch media outlets criticised them for being "out of tune". Both singers attributed their vocal issues to technical problems with their in-ear monitors. Their second live performance of the song at Eurovision in Concert was also met with a largely negative response. AVROTROS later responded to the criticism, stating that it acknowledged that the performances were "not good" and that it would be working to improve the act. Following the negative reception, Jan Smit announced that he would leave the selection committee, revealing that he had opposed the selection of Nicolai and Cooper, despite reports from AVROTROS that the selection had been a unanimous choice; Smit later clarified that his decision to leave the committee was not related to the selection. Prior to travelling to Liverpool, Nicolai and Cooper revealed that they would raise the song's key by three semitones for their Eurovision performance, to better fit their vocal ranges.

== At Eurovision ==
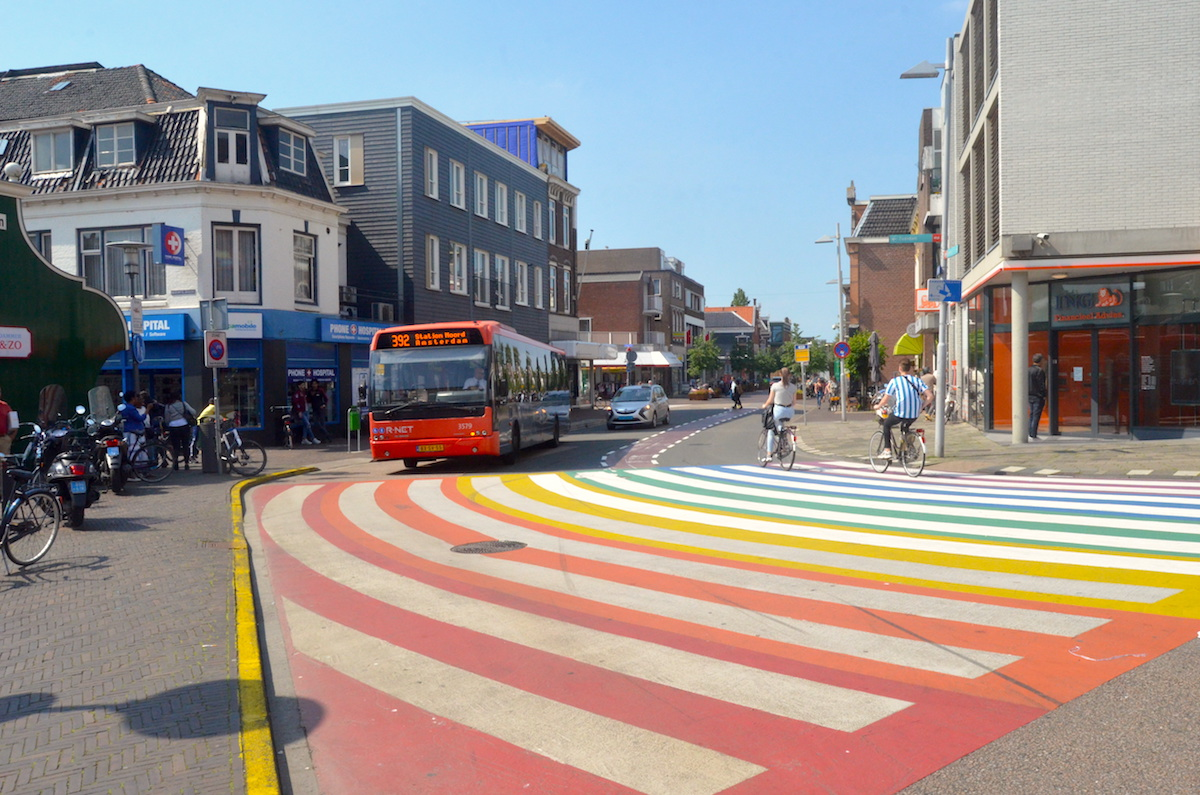
A video postcard introduced Mia Nicolai and Dion Cooper's performance in the first semi-final of the Eurovision Song Contest 2023. The postcard was filmed at Zaandam in March 2023 in collaboration with the host broadcaster BBC. Portmeirion in Gwynedd and the Comfort Town in Kyiv also featured in the Dutch postcard.

According to Eurovision rules, all nations with the exceptions of the host country and the "Big Five" (France, Germany, Italy, Spain and the United Kingdom) are required to qualify from one of two semi-finals in order to compete for the final; the top ten countries from each semi-final progress to the final. The European Broadcasting Union (EBU) split up the competing countries into six different pots based on voting patterns from previous contests, with countries with favourable voting histories put into the same pot. On 31 January 2023, an allocation draw was held, which placed each country into one of the two semi-finals, and determined which half of the show they would perform in. The Netherlands was placed into the first semi-final, to be held on 9 May 2023, and was scheduled to perform in the second half of the show.

Once all the competing songs for the 2023 contest had been released, the running order for the semi-finals was decided by the shows' producers rather than through another draw, so that similar songs were not placed next to each other. The Netherlands was set to perform in position 14, following the entry from the Czech Republic and before the entry from Finland.

The two semi-finals and the final was broadcast in the Netherlands on NPO 1 and BVN with commentary by Cornald Maas and Jan Smit as well as via radio on NPO Radio 2 with commentary by Wouter van der Goes and Frank van 't Hof. The Dutch spokesperson, who announced the top 12-point score awarded by the Dutch jury during the final, was 2022 Dutch Eurovision entrant S10.

=== Semi-final ===
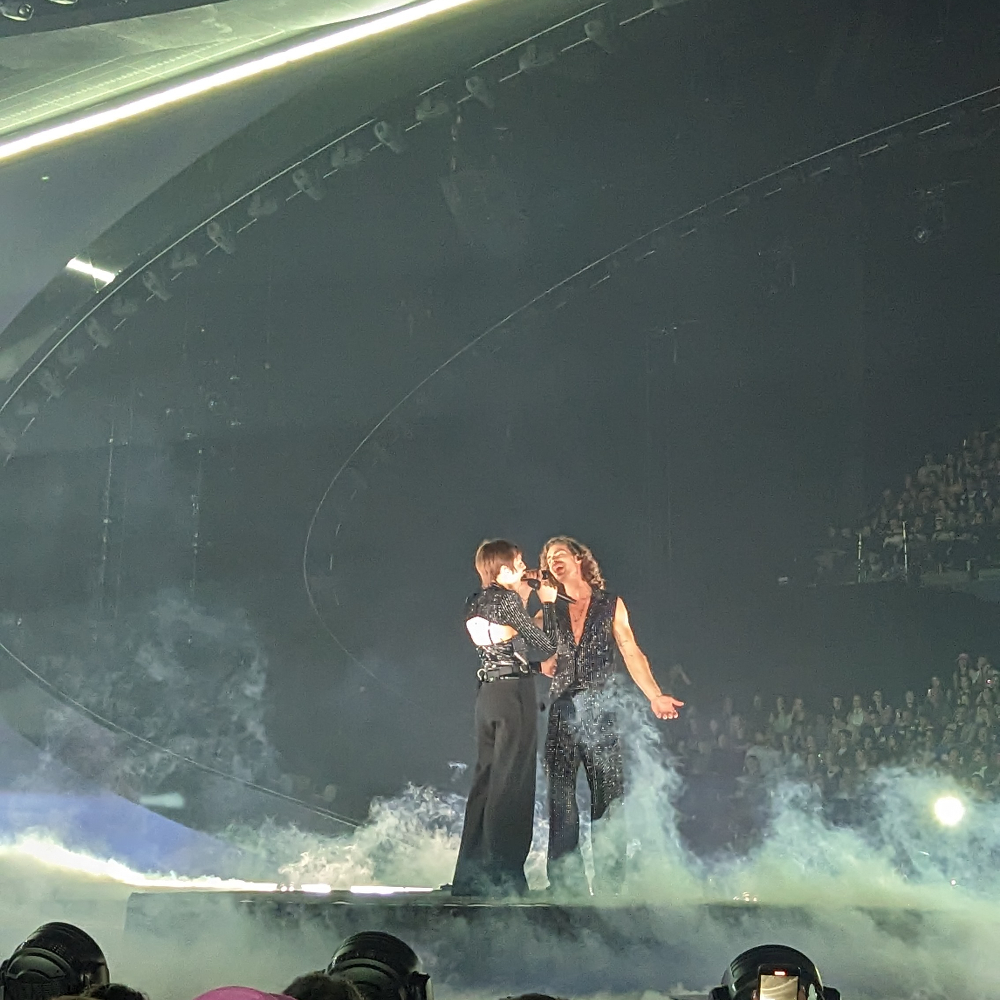
Mia Nicolai and Dion Cooper during a rehearsal before the first semi-final

Mia Nicolai and Dion Cooper took part in technical rehearsals on 1 and 3 May, followed by dress rehearsals on 8 and 9 May. This included the jury show on 8 May where the professional back-up juries of each country watched and voted in a result used if any issues with public televoting occurred.

The Dutch performance featured Mia Nicolai and Dion Cooper wearing black sparkly outfits and performing on a rotating circular platform in the middle of the stage. The stage was predominately dark with white spotlights and the LED screens displaying iridescent flashing lights. The performance also featured the use of smoke effects. The staging director for the performance was Marnix Kaart, who worked with the Dutch entrant in 2022 in a similar role.

At the end of the show, the Netherlands was not announced among the top 10 entries in the first semi-final and therefore failed to qualify to compete in the final. It was later revealed that the Netherlands placed thirteenth in the semi-final, receiving a total of 7 points.

=== Voting ===
Voting during the three shows involved each country awarding sets of points from 1-8, 10 and 12: one from their professional jury and the other from televoting in the final vote, while the semi-final vote was based entirely on the vote of the public. Each nation's jury consisted of five music industry professionals who are citizens of the country they represent. This jury judged each entry based on: vocal capacity; the stage performance; the song's composition and originality; and the overall impression by the act. In addition, each member of a national jury may only take part in the panel once every three years, and no jury was permitted to discuss of their vote with other members or be related in any way to any of the competing acts in such a way that they cannot vote impartially and independently. The individual rankings of each jury member in an anonymised form as well as the nation's televoting results were released shortly after the grand final.

Below is a breakdown of points awarded to the Netherlands and awarded by the Netherlands in the first semi-final and grand final of the contest, and the breakdown of the jury voting and televoting conducted during the two shows:

==== Points awarded to Netherlands ====
Points awarded to Netherlands (Semi-final 1)
Score	Country
12 points	
10 points	
8 points	
7 points	
6 points	
5 points	
4 points	
3 points	
2 points	Moldova; Sweden
1 point	Azerbaijan; Norway; Portugal

==== Points awarded by Netherlands ====
Points awarded by Netherlands (Semi-final)
Score	Country
12 points	Sweden
10 points	Finland
8 points	Switzerland
7 points	Portugal
6 points	Czech Republic
5 points	Norway
4 points	Israel
3 points	Moldova
2 points	Croatia
1 point	Latvia

Points awarded by Netherlands (Final)
Score	Televote	Jury
12 points	Finland	Sweden
10 points	Belgium	Finland
8 points	Sweden	Czech Republic
7 points	Norway	Spain
6 points	Israel	Switzerland
5 points	Estonia	Portugal
4 points	Austria	Belgium
3 points	Italy	France
2 points	Poland	Israel
1 point	Australia	Austria

==== Detailed voting results ====
The following members comprised the Dutch jury:

- Jeroen Kijk in de Vegte
- Rob DeKay
- Froukje Veenstra
- Samya Hafsaoui
- Sjamke de Voogd

Detailed voting results from the Netherlands (Semi-final 1)
R/O	Country	Televote	
R/O	Country	Rank	Points
01	Norway	6	5
02	Malta	12	
03	Serbia	13	
04	Latvia	10	1
05	Portugal	4	7
06	Ireland	14	
07	Croatia	9	2
08	Switzerland	3	8
09	Israel	7	4
10	Moldova	8	3
11	Sweden	1	12
12	Azerbaijan	11	
13	Czech Republic	5	6
14	Netherlands		
15	Finland	2	10

Detailed voting results from the Netherlands (Final)
R/O	Country	Jury							Televote	
R/O	Country	Juror 1	Juror 2	Juror 3	Juror 4	Juror 5	Rank	Points	Rank	Points
01	Austria	3	20	7	13	25	10	1	7	4
02	Portugal	9	9	6	4	7	6	5	19	
03	Switzerland	12	16	2	3	4	5	6	18	
04	Poland	26	25	20	14	20	22		9	2
05	Serbia	19	4	25	6	15	11		25	
06	France	7	18	3	19	9	8	3	11	
07	Cyprus	23	21	21	10	17	20		23	
08	Spain	1	7	5	5	10	4	7	21	
09	Sweden	4	1	1	7	1	1	12	3	8
10	Albania	14	13	16	15	18	19		24	
11	Italy	17	8	12	23	11	15		8	3
12	Estonia	13	6	10	20	8	12		6	5
13	Finland	5	3	4	2	2	2	10	1	12
14	Czech Republic	2	2	18	1	19	3	8	16	
15	Australia	20	10	9	22	16	17		10	1
16	Belgium	10	11	8	8	5	7	4	2	10
17	Armenia	6	19	14	17	12	14		14	
18	Moldova	25	24	19	18	21	25		22	
19	Ukraine	21	15	11	25	22	21		12	
20	Norway	8	17	13	12	6	13		4	7
21	Germany	18	22	24	16	23	23		17	
22	Lithuania	16	14	17	11	13	18		20	
23	Israel	11	12	15	9	3	9	2	5	6
24	Slovenia	15	26	22	26	24	24		15	
25	Croatia	22	5	26	24	14	16		13	
26	United Kingdom	24	23	23	21	26	26		26	
