= Newscoop =

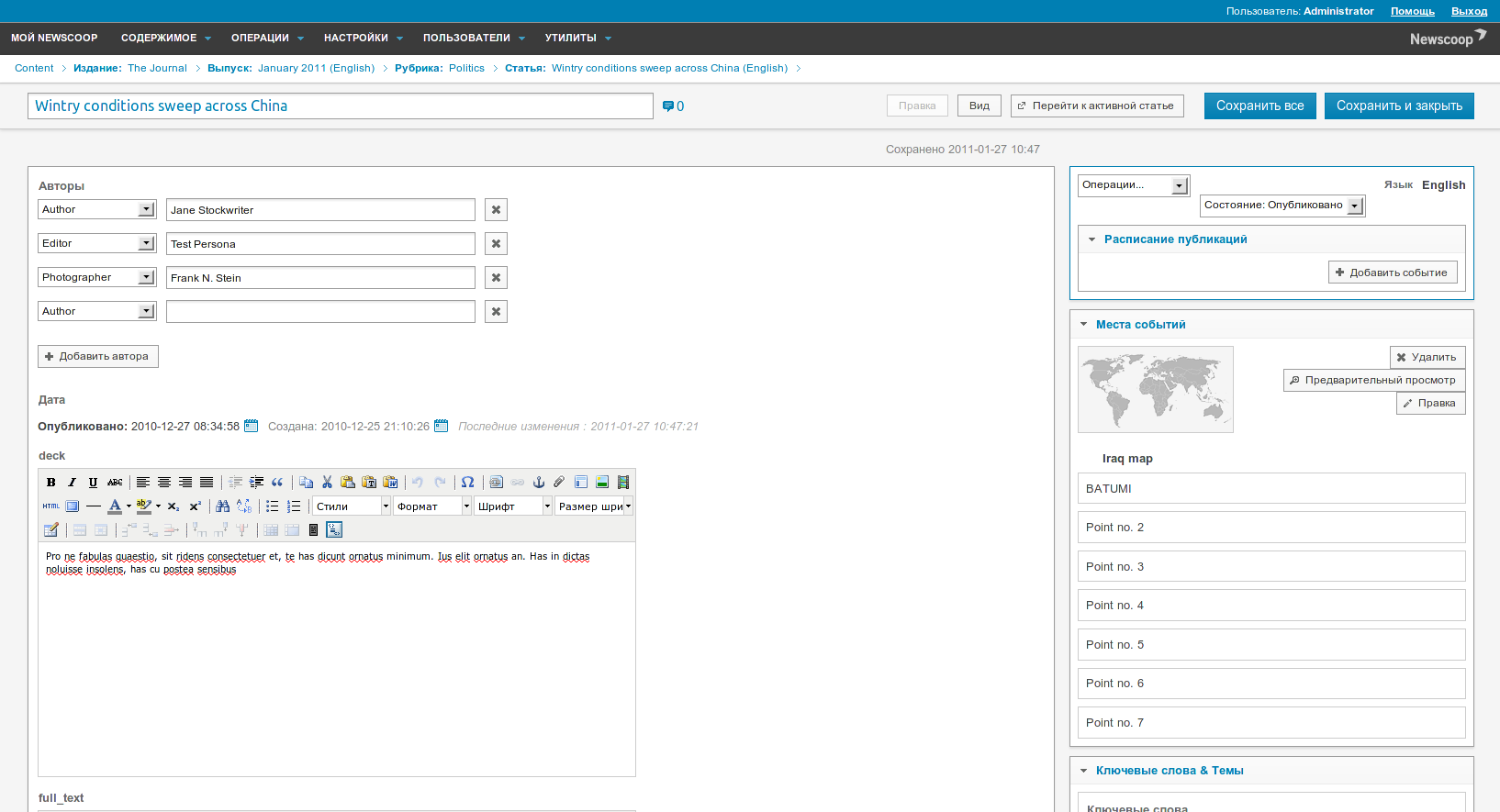
- Screenshot Newscoop is a CMS designed for news organisations.
- Developer: Sourcefabric
- Initial release: 2000; 26 years ago
- Final release: 4.4.7 / February 8, 2016; 10 years ago
- Written in: PHP
- Operating system: Cross-platform
- Available in: Arabic, Chinese, Croatian, Czech, Dutch, English, German, Korean, Portuguese, Romanian, Russian, Serbian (Cyrillic), Serbo-Croatian, Spanish, Swedish
- Type: Content Management System
- License: GNU General Public License v2
- Website: www.sourcefabric.org/software/newscoop
- Repository: github.com/sourcefabric/Newscoop

Newscoop (formerly Campsite) is a free and open source multilingual content management system for news websites. Its localizable user interface was built with journalists, editors and publishers in mind, rather than computer experts, and it can be configured to suit different profiles of end users. Newscoop follows a newspaper publishing model, so it structures sites by default as Publications, Issues, Sections and Articles, rather than nodes or objects. Newscoop is intended for medium-to-large-size online news publications, but it can be used to manage content for smaller sites too. Newscoop allows the management of multiple journalists and publications from a single interface.

== News sites deployments ==
Newscoop has been deployed by more than 50 organisations from Sourcefabric parent organization the Media Development Loan Fund, as shown on its homepage to smaller sites like the La Salle University Collegian Newspaper. International sites displaying a 'Powered by Campsite' badge include elPeriodico de Guatemala.

== Integration with Airtime ==
It is possible to integrate the Newscoop CMS with the Airtime (formerly known as Campcaster) broadcast automation system by linking to audio clips hosted on the Airtime audio file storage server, as used at Kala Radio, a station in Kotor, Montenegro.

== 3.4 release series ==
Features of the current 3.4 release series include improved search options (both internally and for external search engines), a clean up of the graphical interface (new icons and administration interface), and easier installation.

On 30 July 2010, Campsite 3.4.1 was released fixing a potential XSS vulnerability and improving session handling to avoid logged user session grabbing via CSRF attack. The current update version 3.4.3, was released on 5 October 2010, adding Polish localization.

Campsite 3.4 has a user-generated manual hosted by FLOSS Manuals.

== Newscoop renaming ==
On January 17, 2011, Sourcefabric announced the renaming of Campsite to Newscoop.

== Current status and successor ==
Newscoop is no longer under active development, and the project has been succeeded by Superdesk Publisher, which delivers multimedia content through a variety of channels and provides content management and monitoring from a single point of editorial control.
