= Pocket FM =

Portable, low-powered radio transmitter

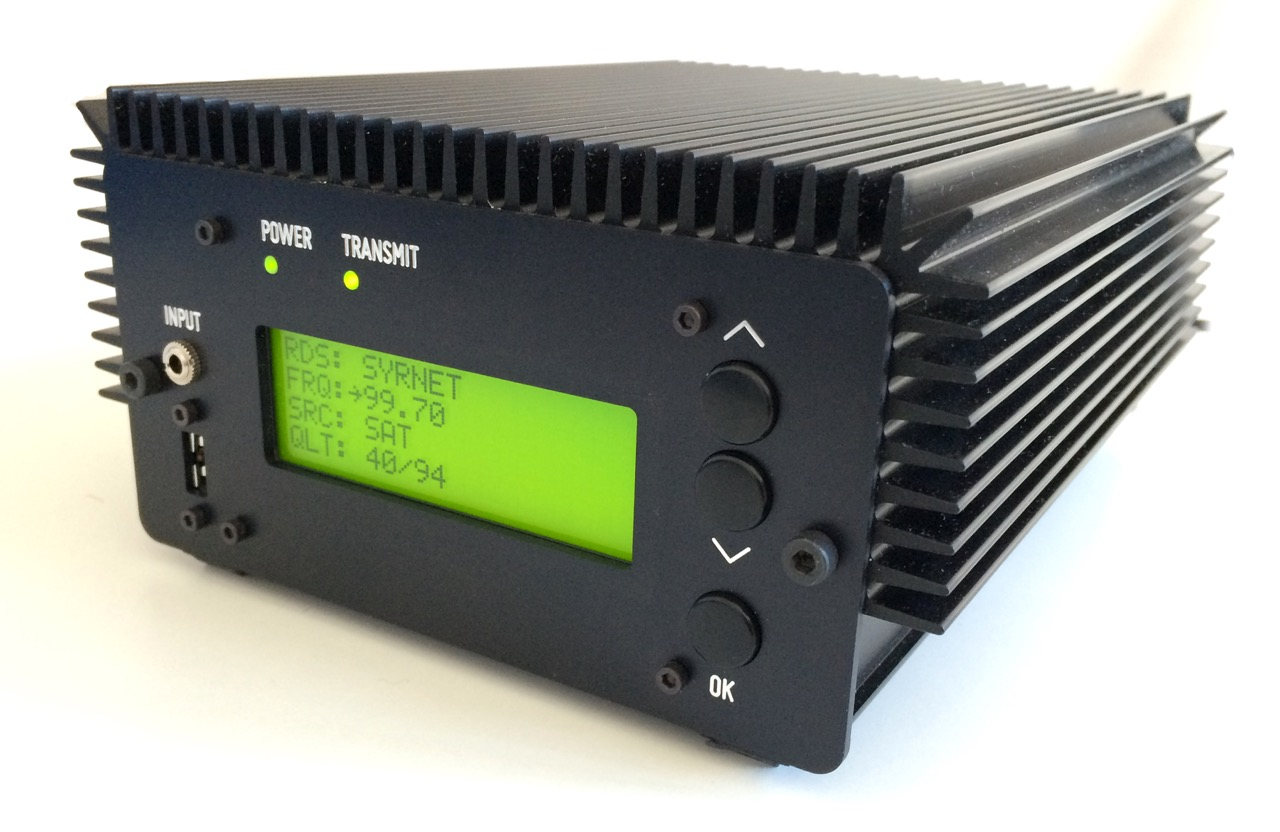
Pocket FM transmitter

Pocket FM is a small, low-powered radio transmitter designed for use in areas with tightly controlled or undeveloped communications infrastructure. The devices are portable and have the appearance of a receiver rather than a transmitter, making them more practical for citizen use and harder for authorities to detect when used subversively in pirate radio networks. It was designed by Germany-based non-profit organization Media in Cooperation and Transition (MiCT) in 2013 and has been deployed in Syria to create the radio network called Syrnet.

== Development ==
MiCT led the project as an extension of its work on media projects to empower people in areas of conflict and crisis. The device's design is a result of the organization's collaboration with German design firm IXDS.

Radio, as an analog medium, is more difficult than Internet and phone networks to shut down, requires less physical infrastructure, and its use is less dependent on a functional electric grid. For these reasons radio is a common medium among resistance and other independent groups.

The early versions' shoebox-sized appearance, as described by The Local, was "a black box about thirty centimeters in length and twenty wide. It is smooth and light with a corrugated surface." Its design emphasizes portability and an appearance unlike typical transmitters. Version 3, introduced at the Global Media Forum in June 2016, is smaller, measuring 20 x 20 x 13 cm, with an aluminum case. The cost of version 3 at release was €3,000.

The Pocket FM was a finalist for 2016 Siemens Stiftung Empowering People Award.

== Technical overview ==
Pocket FM is intended for use in areas with poor or unreliable broadcasting infrastructure, and incorporates several design elements to support its operation in challenging situations. Radio stations typically use large transmitters to produce strong signals broadcast across large areas. However, large transmitters are very expensive, challenging to maintain, and provide highly visible targets for those wishing to sabotage, raid, hijack, or otherwise interrupt communications. The idea behind Pocket FM is to instead create a network of many small transmitters that can blanket an area. The first two versions had a range of 4–6 kilometres (2.5–3.7 mi), with version 3 up to 8 kilometres (8,000 m), using only a 1 metre (3 ft 3 in) antenna.

The device has the ability to change frequencies in case the default frequency is jammed or otherwise unavailable, and it broadcasts a signature using the Radio Data System (RDS) protocol to allow listeners to find the new station if it changes. RDS can also be used to broadcast other text-based messages to users with compatible tuners.

The device runs on 10-15 volts of electricity, capable of being used with a standard power adapter, solar power, or through a car's cigarette lighter receptacle. It is capable of operating autonomously for extended periods when given a steady power supply, and can be passcode-protected to prevent unauthorized transmission.

The computational foundation of the device is Raspberry Pi, an inexpensive, customizable computer platform about the size of a credit card. The use of Raspberry Pi helps to keep the cost of the units low, but its simple, open design also allows for flexibility and experimentation with different configurations and upgrades.

Pocket FM can broadcast material connected through basic analog audio inputs. Importantly, it also comes with a built-in satellite receiver to download audio or connect to a live feed over the Internet where there is otherwise no Internet connection available. It uses Airtime Pro software by Sourcefabric to compile the content stream and provide the streaming links for both public internet streams and towards MiCT's satellite provider.

The third version of the device has GSM, 3G, and Wi-fi capabilities, creating several ways of accessing and operating it remotely, depending on available technology: SMS text message, a web browser, or directly via wireless network.

== Implementations ==
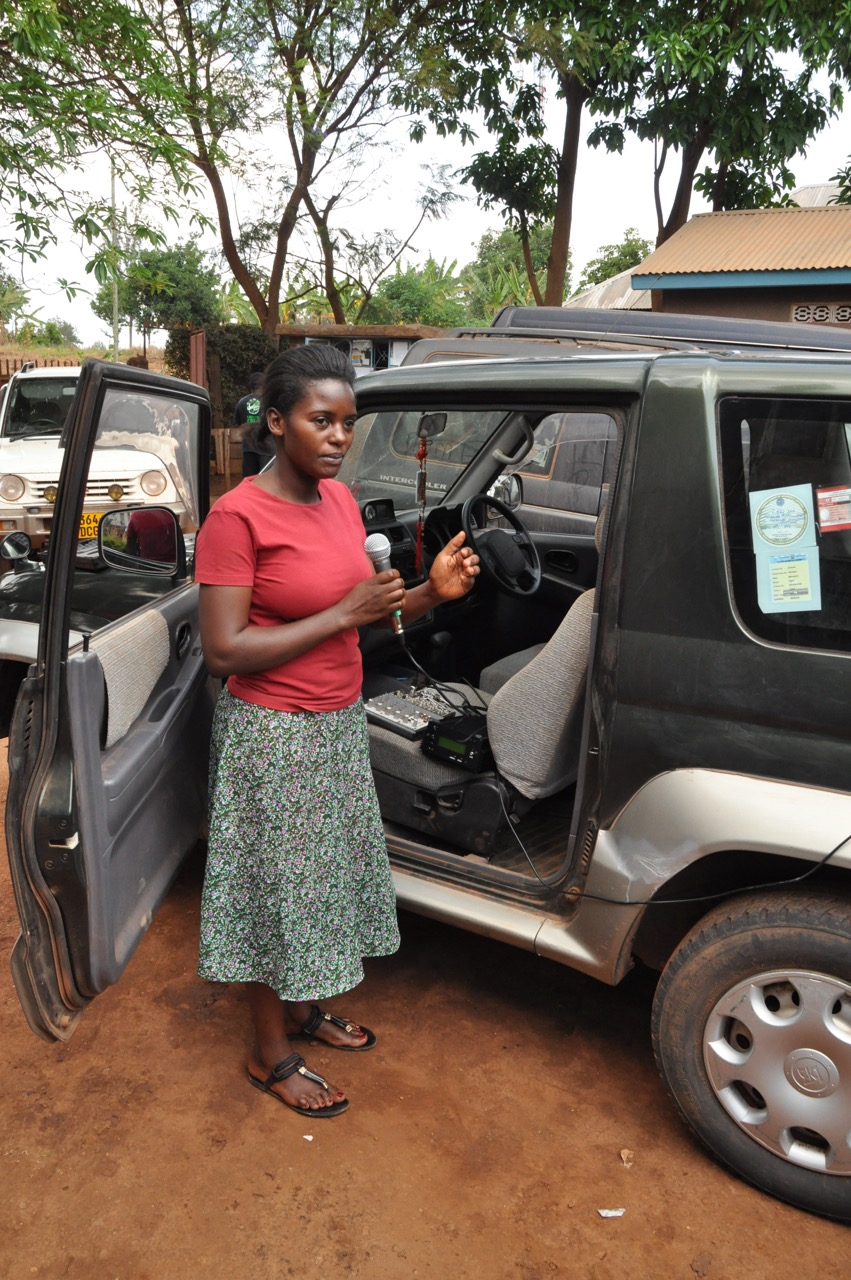
A woman using Pocket FM to broadcast from her vehicle in Tanzania

Pocket FM was first deployed in Syria in September 2013. Since then MiCT has also started a project in Sierra Leone and smaller initiatives in Yemen and Tanzania. As of December 3 MiCT has produced about two dozen units.

=== Syria ===
Pocket FM was developed for use in Syria. Throughout the Syrian Civil War, president Bashar al-Assad has exerted control over communications infrastructure, frequently disabling Internet, phone networks, and electricity, and making frequent use of propaganda and misinformation in state-run mass media. But when other modes of communication become unavailable and unbiased reporting is inaccessible, most Syrians still have access to a radio receiver, either as a battery-powered stand-alone device or as part of a cell phone.

Syrnet, a radio network enabled by Pocket FM, launched in September 2013 to provide information that would be censored or manipulated if reported on by state-run media. As of December 2015, Syrnet operates nine stations in different areas of the country, including areas controlled by the Islamic State of Iraq and the Levant (ISIS). In addition to allowing for reports to be shared with other regions where the situation may be very different, the use of a structure with multiple centers of operation ensures that a raid on one does not pose an existential threat to the broadcast.

The units change hands multiple times in order to get them into the country, ending up with a local resident who has identified a potential location to hide the transmitter, as far from civilian homes as possible without losing the signal. Given the political climate, the frequency with which journalists and activists have been detained or even killed, and the ease with which any radio transmitter can be triangulated even if not visually identified, precautions are necessary. According to MiCT project manager Philip Hochleichter, none of the units have been discovered as of December 2, and only one has been lost, due to bombing in Kobanî.

The network combines local and external content, which is broadcast throughout the country via Pocket FM as well as through NileSat and Internet downloads. The radio network approach to broadcasting allows Syrian citizens access to censored outside broadcasts, creates a sustainable system for communications between and about different parts of the country and the dissemination of stories to a global audience. To help local stations and reporters, MiCT employs a team of professionals from the journalism field to assist with production.

=== Sierra Leone ===
MiCT is working with Culture Radio, a Freetown media organization, to disseminate information about Ebola to communities in Sierra Leone who have not had access to other campaigns about the disease and its prevention.

== See also ==
- Community radio
- Low-power broadcasting
