= The News Lens =

Independent bilingual website

- 關鍵評論網
- Formation: 2013 (13 years ago)
- Founder: Joey Chung and Mario Yang
- Type: Media
- Headquarters: Taipei, Taiwan
- Website: www.thenewslens.com

The News Lens (Chinese: 關鍵評論網; TNL) is a Taiwanese digital news media organization founded by Joey Chung and Mario Yang in 2013, with multilingual versions in Chinese, English and Japanese. Since 2017, it has maintained content partnerships with other outlets such as Time and Fortune. Article categories include politics, economics, technology, society, and more.

The News Lens
- Traditional Chinese: 關鍵評論網
Transcriptions
Standard Mandarin
- Hanyu Pinyin: Guānjiàn pínglùn wǎng

As of 2018, The News Lens had significantly fewer readers in Taiwan than the top local outlets like Apple Daily, Sanlih, or Dongsen, which led it to expand its readership to reach other places such as Hong Kong, the United States and Southeast Asia.

By July 2020, following a series of acquisitions, TNL Media Group successfully expanded into data analytics and advertising technology fields. In 2022, it was featured by Harvard Business School as a Case Study for Leadership & Managing People. It has become one of the fastest-growing digital content and technology companies in the global Mandarin market. In May 2023, it acquired Mediagene, Japan's largest native digital media group, marking the first instance of a Taiwanese media company acquiring a foreign media entity. The following month, it announced its new company name as TNL Mediagene and declared its intention to list on the NASDAQ in the United States in 2024.

== Investment ==
TNL Media Group has completed its series D financing. The existing high-profile investors include North Base Media, a firm created by Marcus Brauchli and Sasa Vucinic; 500 Startups; Palm Drive Capital; YouTube co-founder Steve Chen; and Twitch co-founder Kevin Lin.

== Staff ==
The principal staff members are:

Co-founder/CEO: Joey Chung (鍾子偉), former president of Sanrio in China.

Co-founder/CCO: Mario Yang (楊士範), former editor-in-chief of CNET Taiwan; senior editor of Business Weekly (Taiwan).

Director: Marcus Brauchli, former executive editor of The Washington Post and former managing editor of The Wall Street Journal.

Advisory Director: Saša Vučinić, co-founder and former CEO and managing director of the Media Development Loan Fund.

== Awards and recognition ==
- In 2015, received a World Young Readers Award issued by WAN-IFRA.
- In 2017, received the Bronze Award for Best Life, Sports or Entertainment Website, issued by WAN-IFRA's Asian Digital Media Awards.
- In 2017, received Excellence in Data Analytics, issued by Asia-Pacific Biggies Awards.
- In 2020, was awarded funding from Google News Initiative for the GNI Innovation Challenges in the Asia Pacific region.
- In 2021, received the Gold Award for Best Data Visualisation, issued by WAN-IFRA's Digital Media Awards.
- In 2022, was ranked #405 in a list compiled by Financial Times and Statista of Asia-Pacific's Top 500 High-Growth Companies.
- In 2022, received Excellence in Audio Reporting Award, Excellence in Journalistic Innovation Honorable Mention and Excellence in Infographics Honorable Mention, issued by SOPA Award.
