= Akhenaten (disambiguation) =

Akhenaton, Akhnaton, Akhnaten or Akhenaten may refer to:

- Akhenaten, Pharaoh of the Eighteenth dynasty of Egypt
- Akhnaton (play), 1937 play by Agatha Christie about the pharaoh
- Akhnaten (opera), a 1983 Philip Glass opera about the pharaoh
- Akhenaten (verse novel), a 1992 poem by Dorothy Porter
- Akhenaton (rapper) (b. 1968), stage name of French rapper Philippe Fragione
- Akhenaten, Dweller in Truth, 1985 novel by Naguib Mahfouz
- Akhenaten: Son of the Sun, 1986 novel by Moyra Caldecott
- Akhnaton (music venue), in Amsterdam

== See also ==
- Akhaten, a planet in the British science fiction television series Doctor Who
