= Michelle Thorne (Creative Commons) =

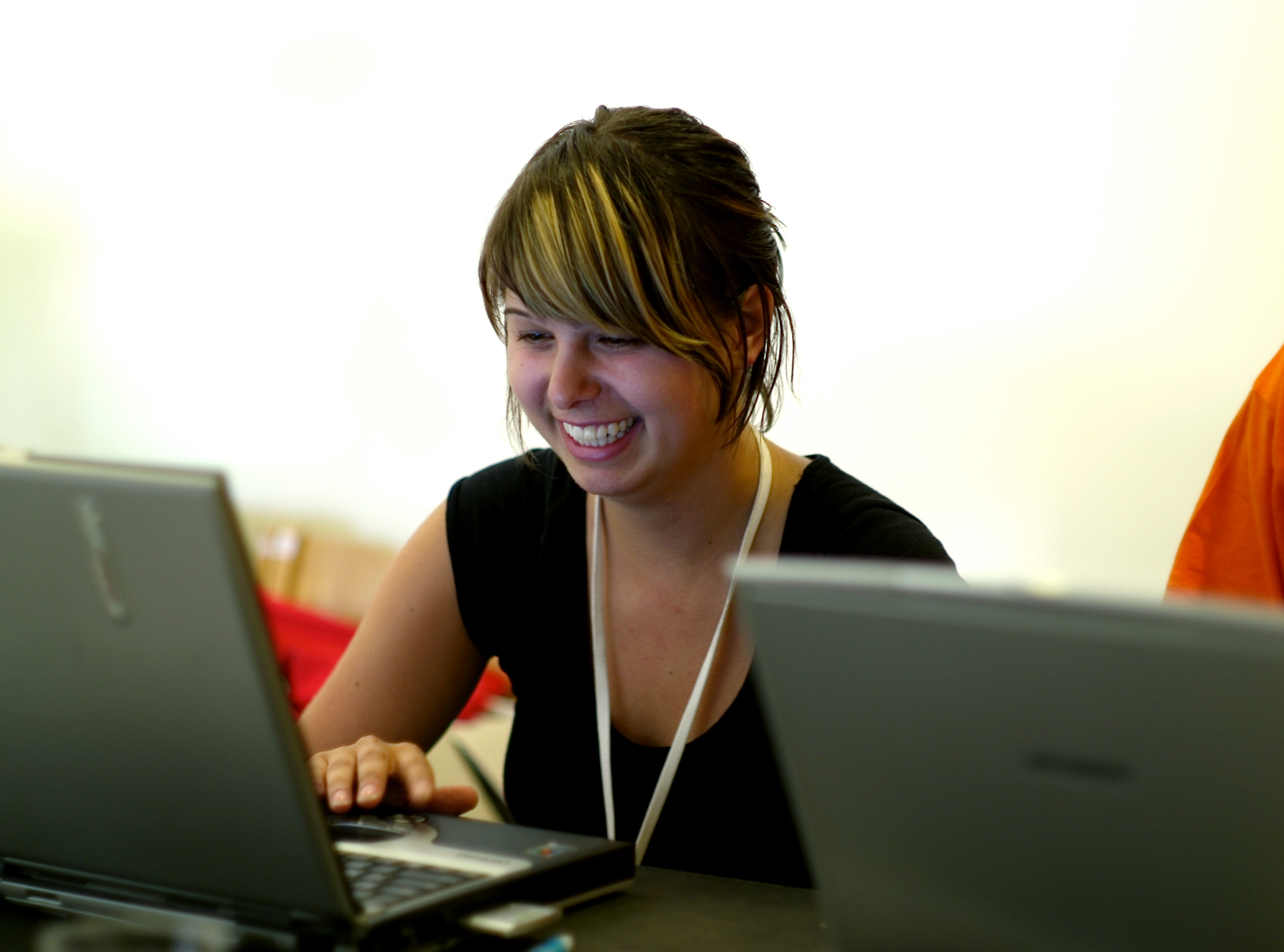
- Michelle Thorne 2007, by Joi Ito
- Born: January 15, 1985 (age 41); United States
- Education: Mount Holyoke College; University of Leipzig
- Occupation: Green Web Foundation
- Known for: Green Web Foundation, Creative Commons, Mozilla, Awesome Foundation

Michelle Thorne speaks about Mozilla culture and openness at Maker Party 2013 in Bangalore

Michelle Thorne (born 1985) is an American-born, Berlin, Germany-based internet culture and climate justice activist who is known for leading community initiatives at Mozilla and before then with Creative Commons. Her work focuses on knowledge sharing and on the social and planetary implications of new technologies.

She is the Director of Strategy and Partnerships at the Green Web Foundation an organization focused on climate justice related to the Internet. She served 12 years with the Mozilla Foundation in a number of different roles, including in her final years as Mozilla's Sustainable Internet Lead.

She is the editor of an award-winning online magazine, Branch.

== Early life and education ==
Thorne grew up in Heidelberg, Germany. She holds a BA summa cum laude in Critical Social Thought and German Studies from Mount Holyoke College, USA, where she wrote an honors thesis on authorship, originality, and American copyright law.

== Career ==
She worked as the international project manager for Creative Commons from 2007 to 2011 and joined the Mozilla Foundation as Global Event Strategist in 2011. She organized the Drumbeat Festival and the first several editions of the Mozilla Festival, which grew to be the largest annual gathering of the Mozilla community.

She is co-author of the book Understanding the Connected Home: Thoughts on living in tomorrow's connected home in 2016 (2nd edition) and was a co-founder of Mozilla's Open IoT Studio the same year, which later evolved into a PhD program on internet health with the University of Northumbria called OpenDoTT in 2018. At Mozilla, she co-founded the magazine Ding in 2017 with Jon Rogers.

She was a founding member of the Awesome Foundation Berlin, which is no longer active.

In 2020, she founded the online magazine Branch to convene people and ideas on how to make the internet itself more sustainable for the planet. She is also a Senior Program Officer on Mozilla's Fellowships and Awards team.

== Honors and awards ==
- 2021: Ars Electronica Award for Digital Humanity for the online magazine Branch

== Bibliography ==
=== Books ===
- Thorne, Michelle; Bihr, Peter (2016). Understanding the Connected Home: Thoughts on living in tomorrow's connected home (2nd Edition)

=== Articles ===
- Taylor, Nick; Rogers, Jon; Clarke, Loraine; Skelly, Martin; Wallace, Jayne; Thomas, Pete; George, Babitha; Raj, Romit; Shorter, Mike; Thorne, Michelle. Prototyping Things: Reflecting on Unreported Objects of Design Research for IoT (2021)
- Jansen, Fieke; Thorne, Michelle (2020) Trustworthy AI and the Climate Crisis – Towards Better Policies in the EU, The State of Responsible IoT, Lancaster University
- Rogers, Jon; Clarke, Loraine; Skelly, Martin; Taylor, Nick; Thomas, Pete; Thorne, Michelle; Larsen, Solana; Odrozek, Katarzyna; Kloiber, Julia; Bihr, Peter; Jain, Anab; Arden, Jon; von Grafenstein, Max (2019) Our friends electric: Reflections on advocacy and design research for the voice enabled internet, Proceedings of the 2019 CHI Conference on Human Factors in Computing SystemsMay 2019 Paper No.: 114 (Pages 1–13)
- Thorne, Michelle (August 2014). How You Run a Meeting Says a Lot About Your Values: Participatory Practices for Open Communities, OpenSym '14: Proceedings of The International Symposium on Open Collaboration
- Thorne, Michelle et al. book sprint(2011) An Open Web. FLOSS Manuals, ARTE Creative.
- Thorne, Michelle; Cobcroft, Rachel (2009) Capturing the Commons: (Ways Forward for) The CC Case Studies Initiative" (PDF), Free Culture Research Workshop, Berkman Klein Center, Harvard Law School.

=== Speaking ===
Thorne regularly organizes events and gives talks about the commons, open design, and collaborative consumption.

Her design challenges for sharable objects were cited by Bruce Sterling and she was interviewed in the film The Future of Art.
