= Dataphyte =

Nigerian data journalism and research platform

- Type: Private
- Industry: Information Technology
- Founded: 2019
- Founder: Joshua Olufemi
- Headquarters: Abuja, Nigeria
- Area served: Worldwide
- Products: Publishing; Web portals; Technology
- Website: www.dataphyte.com

Dataphyte is a social impact organisation operating as an access to information for development program and as an end-to-end data-as-a-service platform offering data services. Dataphyte uses data science and artificial intelligence tools to gather, curate, store and offer data in extractive industries on diverse subjects including government policy, economy, market trends, health, education, security, election, and climate. Dataphyte transforms generated data into machine-readable formats, generates interactive visualisations, analyses and publishes insights into the data, making it an open data source for journalists, civil society organisations and researchers.

== History ==
Dataphyte was founded in 2019 by Joshua Olufemi, a Nigerian media and civic technology innovator. Dataphyte's work has been funded by the Open Society Initiative for West Africa, National Endowment for Democracy, the Media Development Investment Fund, and the BigLocal News Project at Stanford University.

== Products and Services ==
=== Dataphyte’s Insights ===
Dataphyte conducts research and analysis, contributes to broader understanding of trends on socioeconomic issues by providing open access to data driven insights referenced both locally and globally.

In 2020, Dataphyte partnered with Statista and enhanced its availability of data and reports through its socio-economic reporting platform, both within Nigeria and globally.

In 2021, Dataphyte delivered its first advisory notes and data-driven insights on Nigeria transitioning to a post-oil economy. These advisory notes were published to guide policymakers and stakeholders in identifying sustainable economic opportunities and making strategic investments that will help diversify the economy and reduce dependence on oil.

Through investigative journalism and data-driven reporting, Dataphyte plays an instrumental role in providing data for journalists, combatting misinformation and promoting media integrity in Nigeria. The organisation’s investigations have led to significant outcomes, such as governmental acknowledgment of unethical practices and policy adjustments. Additionally, Dataphyte's journalists have received recognition for their impactful work, including exposés on public contracting projects in Nigeria.

=== Anfani ===
In 2022, Dataphyte launched a civic tech platform, Anfani, an open-source tool designed to combat corruption in Nigeria by linking public procurement data with beneficial ownership information.

=== Goloka ===
Goloka unveiled in a citizen powered data collection solution that provides real-time, highly-localised and spatially-enriched insights to organisations crowdsourcing data globally. In 2024, two years after it was launched, Dataphyte partnered with a non-profit organisation, CJID on a USAID-funded project to collect and analyse data on socio-economic impact of green minerals in local communities in Nigeria, Ghana, the Democratic Republic of Congo, and Mozambique. This data will be used to inform policy decisions and advocacy efforts.

=== Nubia ===
Dataphyte's Nubia project was launched in 2022 as part of the JournalismAI Fellowship. Incubated within this program, Nubia was developed to leverage AI to transform large data sets into engaging news stories. In 2024, Dataphyte teamed up with Archiving to use Nubia to analyse historical data on it archives to generate stories.

=== Dataphyte Foundation ===
Dataphyte Foundation, the non-profit arm of Dataphyte, supports civic actors by providing access to data, insights, and resources to promote transparency and accountability. Among other projects, It conducts research to advance democratic values in Nigeria and organises stakeholder dialogues to advocate for data use in strengthening democracy.
