= Giussani =

Giussani may refer to:

- Bruno Giussani, Swiss writer
- Edgardo Giussani (born 1955), Argentine tennis player
- Luigi Giussani, Italian priest and founder of Communion and Liberation
- Angela and Luciana Giussani, who created the famous comics character Diabolik
