= Jim Stolze =

Dutch tech-entrepreneur (born 1973)

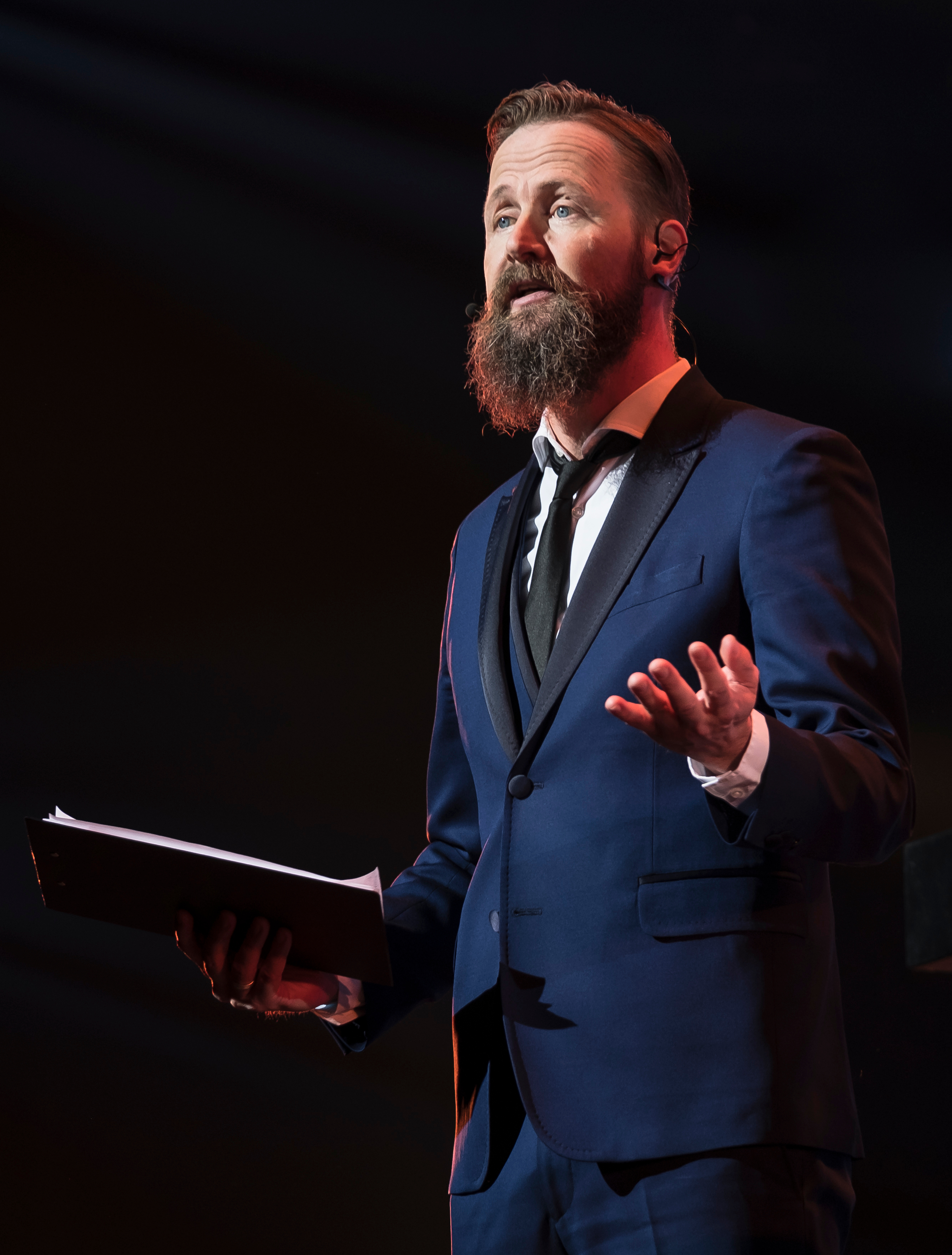
- Born: November 30, 1973 (age 52); Vlaardingen, Netherlands
- Occupations: Writer, entrepreneur
- Jim Stolze's voice recorded at TEDxAmsterdam 2014

Jim Stolze (born November 30, 1973) is a tech-entrepreneur located at Amsterdam Science Park, mostly known for his work in the worldwide TEDx Community and the European Startup scene.

== Author ==
A graduate of VU University Amsterdam, Stolze earned his MBA from the Lemniscaat Business School. His Master Thesis captured international attention because of an experiment in which he went completely offline for a whole month. Stolze shared his experiences in a book called How to survive your Inbox.

His second book was called Sold Out! in which he describes the "attention economy". The book was nominated management book of the year. In his third book he coins the term "algorithmization". According to Stolze everything that was digitized can only be of value if the right algorithms are applied. He draws from his experience as the founder of an artificial intelligence startup.

== TEDx ==
Jim Stolze is an active leader in the TEDx community. Together with his team he organized 10 editions of TEDxAmsterdam with an international cast of speakers, including technology visionary Kevin Kelly, Danish architect Bjarke Ingels, former astronaut Wubbo Ockels, professor Barry Schwartz and Commander in Chief Peter van Uhm. He also played an active part in TEDxAruba, TEDxBinnenhof, TEDxDelft, TEDxMaastricht, TEDxDoha and TEDxMuscat. TEDx is a program of local, self-organized events that bring people together to share a TED-like experience.

In 2012 he moved for five months to Doha (Qatar) to work for TED and the Doha Film Institute to help set up an organization that fosters TED's mission of 'ideas worth spreading'. With Bruno Giussani as the curator and Stolze as the executive producer the biggest outdoor TED Session took place. This opening night was live streamed on Al Jazeera English.

== Leadership ==
Together with the European Commission he created a program called "Ideas from Europe" (2015). On this platform aspiring entrepreneurs from 28 member states joined to see how their business ideas could have a positive impact on society.

In 2016 Jim Stolze was asked by former vice-president of the European Commission Neelie Kroes and Prince Constantijn of the Netherlands to create a festival of match making between startups, investors, corporates and developers. As a result, his Startup Fest Europe organized a tour where leaders like Tim Cook (Apple), Eric Schmidt (Alphabet), Travis Kalanick (Uber) and Chris Anderson (Wired) met with aspiring European startups.

In 2018 he shared the stage with Barack Obama, Marshall Goldsmith and Michaela DePrince during a seminar in Amsterdam where over 3000 people gathered to get leadership advice from the former president and a diverse group of thought leaders.

== Artificial intelligence ==
A faculty member of Singularity University, Stolze is considered to be a techno-optimist. As a researcher he contributed to the Asilomar Conference on Beneficial AI offering the Dutch translation of the 23 principles.
