= WADR =

WADR may refer to:

- West Africa Democracy Radio
- WADR-LP, a low-power U.S. radio station in Wisconsin (103.5 FM), licensed to Janesville
- WRCK (AM), a radio station (1480 AM) licensed to Remsen, New York, which held the call sign WADR from 1966 to 2012
