= Kris Berry =

Dutch singer

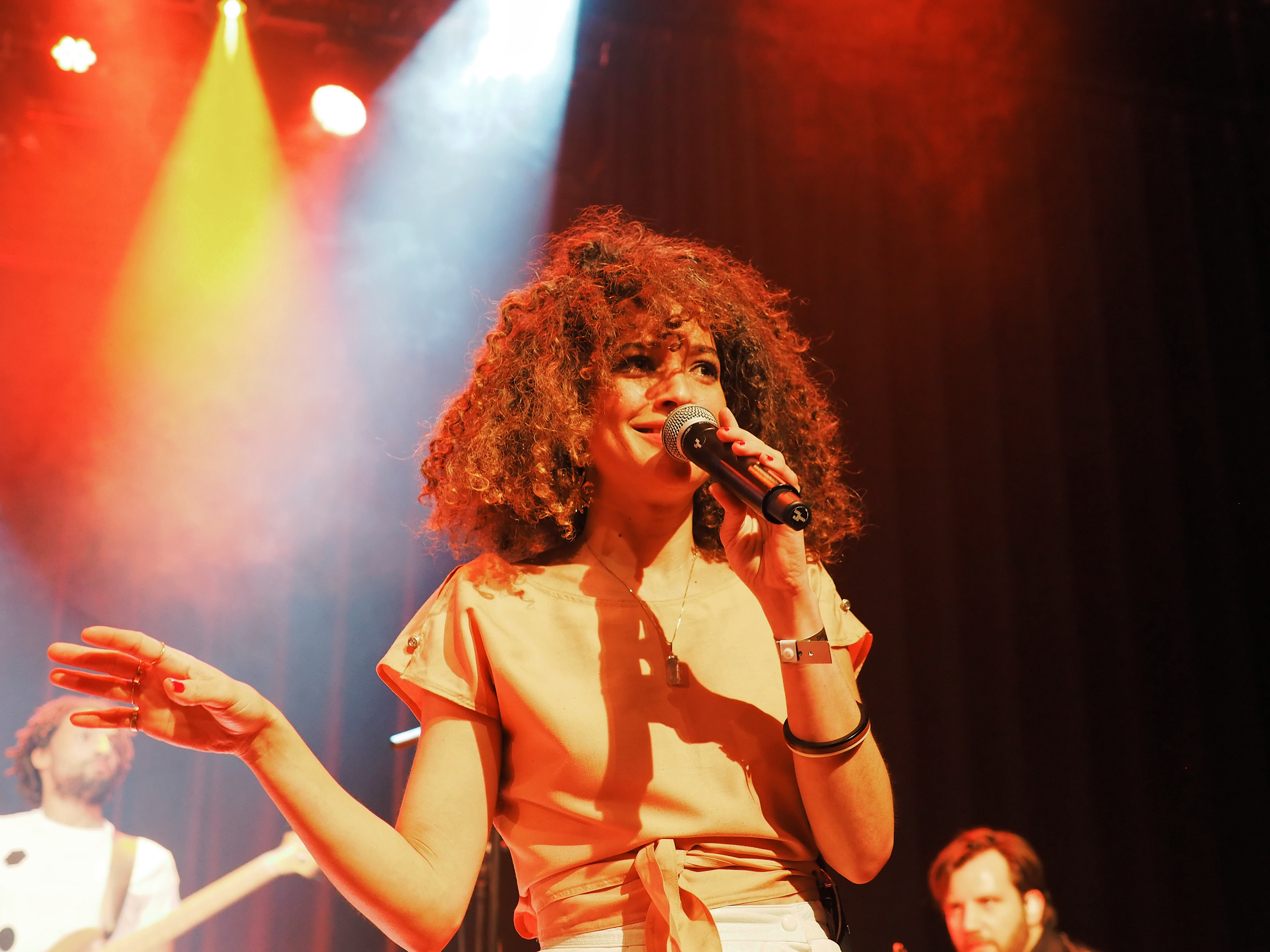
- Utrecht concert in 2017

Background information
- Genres: jazz
- Years active: 2011–present
- Website: www.krisberrynow.com

Kris Berry (born Curaçao, 1982) is a Dutch singer.

== Career ==
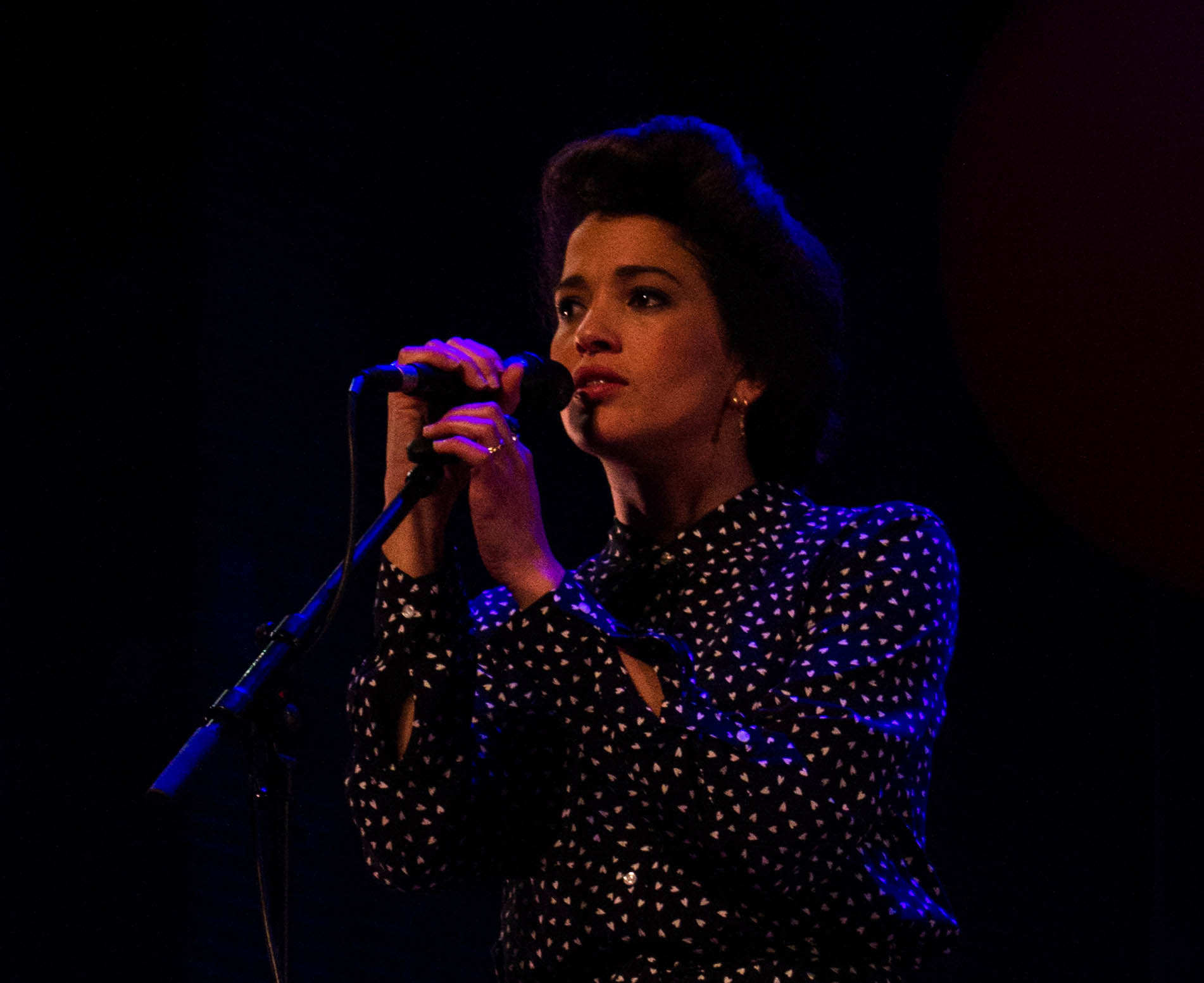
TEDxAmsterdam, 2014.

In 2011, Berry performed at North Sea Jazz Festival. Her debut album Marbles was released in 2012 with Wicked Jazz Sounds Recordings.

In August 2013 she performed at the Curaçao North Sea Jazz Festival. Berry and Perquisite released Lovestruck Puzzles with Unexpected Records in September 2013.

In October 2014, Berry opened for Caro Emerald during her 11-day tour in the UK, including the O2 Arena and SSE Hydro. In November 2014, Berry performed at TEDxAmsterdam.

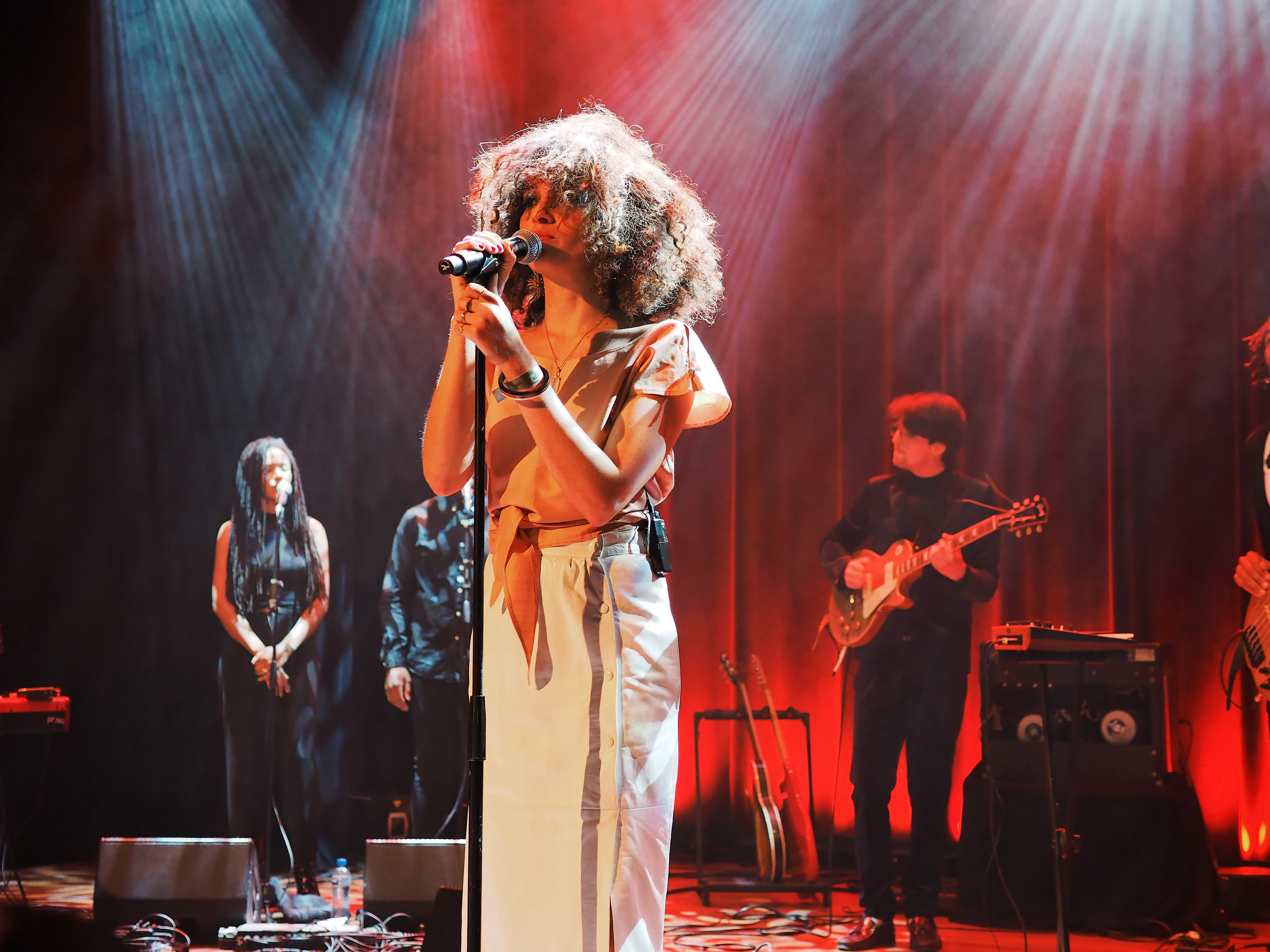
Kris Berry in concert at TivoliVredenburg, 2017.

In May 2017, Berry released her new album Berry Street at TivoliVredenburg in Utrecht. The album was recorded in Brooklyn, New York and produced with producers Jesse Singer and Chris Soper. She subsequently toured the Netherlands, including at Sugarfactory in Amsterdam and Metropool in Hengelo.

In 2018, Berry opened fourteen shows in the UK for Gregory Porter, including at the Royal Albert Hall in London, and O2 Apollo in Manchester.

In May 2022, it was revealed Berry is on the jury for Eurovision Song Contest 2022.

== Discography ==
- Marbles (2012, WJS Recordings)
- Lovestruck Puzzles with Perquisite (2013, Unexpected Records)
- Berry Street (2017)
- Raís (2020) (together with Randal Corsen and Jean-Jacques Rojer)
- N.O.W. (2022)

== Reception ==
In February 2011, Berry won the NPO Radio 6 Soul & Jazz Talent award. In the summer of 2011 she was invited to perform at North Sea Jazz Festival in Rotterdam, and again in 2013 at the Curaçao North Sea Jazz Festival.

Erwin Zijleman, Dutch music reviewer, described her 2012 debut album Marbles as "jazzy pop music with substance".

The 2013 single Hold On became a 3FM Megahit at the 3FM national radio station in the Netherlands.

The Herald described Berry as having "astonishingly pure but powerful vocals" after her 2014 performance at The Hydro in Glasgow.

Zijleman describes the Berry Street album as "breating quality" powered by Berry's "fantastic voice".

As of April 2020, Berry has over 300,000 monthly listeners on Spotify. Her song Hold On from the album Berry Street reached 10 million streams in October 2019 and 20 million streams by June 2022.
