= New Art/Science Affinities =

Book

New Art/Science Affinities (NA/SA) is a book published by the Miller Gallery at Carnegie Mellon University and STUDIO for Creative Inquiry. It focuses on contemporary artists and those in art departments nationwide who are working at the intersection of art, science, and technology. The book features sixty international artists and art collaboratives. It is accompanied by an exhibition titled Intimate Science, first shown at the Miller Gallery in January 2012.

New Art/Science Affinities book cover

== Creation ==
New Art/Science Affinities was designed and written at the Frank-Ratchye STUDIO for Creative Inquiry on Carnegie Mellon University's campus in February 2011. The book was created through a working model for collaborative book authorship known as a book sprint, derived from code sprinting. The project was led by Andrea Grover and co-authored by Régine Debatty, Claire L. Evans, and Pablo Garcia and two designers (Luke Bulman and Jessica Young of Thumb).

"As a ‘snapshot’ created on the run over seven days, it necessarily portrays a quite particular moment and choice." The publication is not a complete history of the interstices of art, technology, and science, although there is a timeline in the back marking some of the most important events in history including the 1968 exhibition of computer art titled Cybernetic Serendipity at the Institute of Contemporary Arts, London.

== Content and featured artists ==
A common theme that emerges in New Art/Science Affinities is concern for the environment. Four of the book's six creators are women, though the publication features more male artists than female artists.

Grover stated that the book highlights artists who conduct scientific research, observing that the 'lines of inquiry' in such practices differ from traditional art/science pairings.

The book is divided into 6 chapters with an additional timeline of Art, Science & Technology Intersections.

| Chapter | Authors |
|---|---|
| Program Art or be Programmed | C.E.B. Reas, Rafael Lozano-Hemmer, Jer Thorp, Marius Watz, Aaron Koblin, with comments from Golan Levin |
| Subvert! | Robin Hewlett and Ben Kinsley, Sebastian Brajkovic, Julius von Bismarck, Paul Vanouse, Julian Oliver and Danja Vasiliev, Marco Donnarumma, Willy Sengewald (Studio TheGreenEyl), Boredomresearch, with comments from Julian Oliver, Danja Vasiliev, and Johannes Grenzfurthner |
| Citizen Science | Cesar Harada, HeHe, Critter, Machine Project, Center for PostNatural History, Institute for Figuring, with comments from Cesar Harada and Fred Adams |
| Artists in White Coats and Latex Gloves | Brandon Ballengée, Gilberto Esparza, Philip Ross, BCL, Kathy High, Fernando Orellana, SWAMP, Agnes Meyer-Brandis, SymbioticA and Tissue Culture & Art Project, with comments from Phil Ross and Adam Zaretsky |
| The Maker Moment | Machine Project, Thomas Thwaites, Jonah Brucker-Cohen and Katherine Moriwaki, John Cohrs, Free Art and Technology Lab (F.A.T.), Openframeworks, The Graffiti Research Lab, and the Ebeling Group with comments from Geraldine Juarez, Mark Allen, and Jonah Brucker-Cohen |
| The Overview Effect | Tomàs Saraceno, Dunne & Raby, Sascha Pohflepp, Bruce Sterling, Atelier van Lieshout, etoy with comments from Jeff Lieberman, Sascha Pohflepp, and Wendy Fok |
