= Syrnet =

Syrian pirate radio network

Syrnet is a Syrian pirate radio network launched in September 2013 to broadcast information to citizens that is suppressed or manipulated by state-run media. It was developed by Germany-based non-profit organization Media in Cooperation and Transition (MiCT), with funding provided by the German Foreign Office. As of December 2015, there are nine studios producing content in different parts of the country.

== Background ==
Syrian president Bashar al-Assad has repeatedly sabotaged or exerted control over communications infrastructure, disabling Internet, phone networks, and even electricity. The media that is accessible is often created by or filtered by the Syrian government, which makes frequent use of propaganda and misinformation.

Radio, as an analog technology, is more difficult than the Internet and phone networks to shut down. It also requires less physical infrastructure and its use is less dependent on a functional electric grid. For these reasons radio is a common medium among resistance and other independent groups. Some Syrians have had access to Western-operated external broadcasts prior to Syrnet, but those stations have typically operated outside of the country, leaving a scarcity of coverage of the most immediate and important news stories.

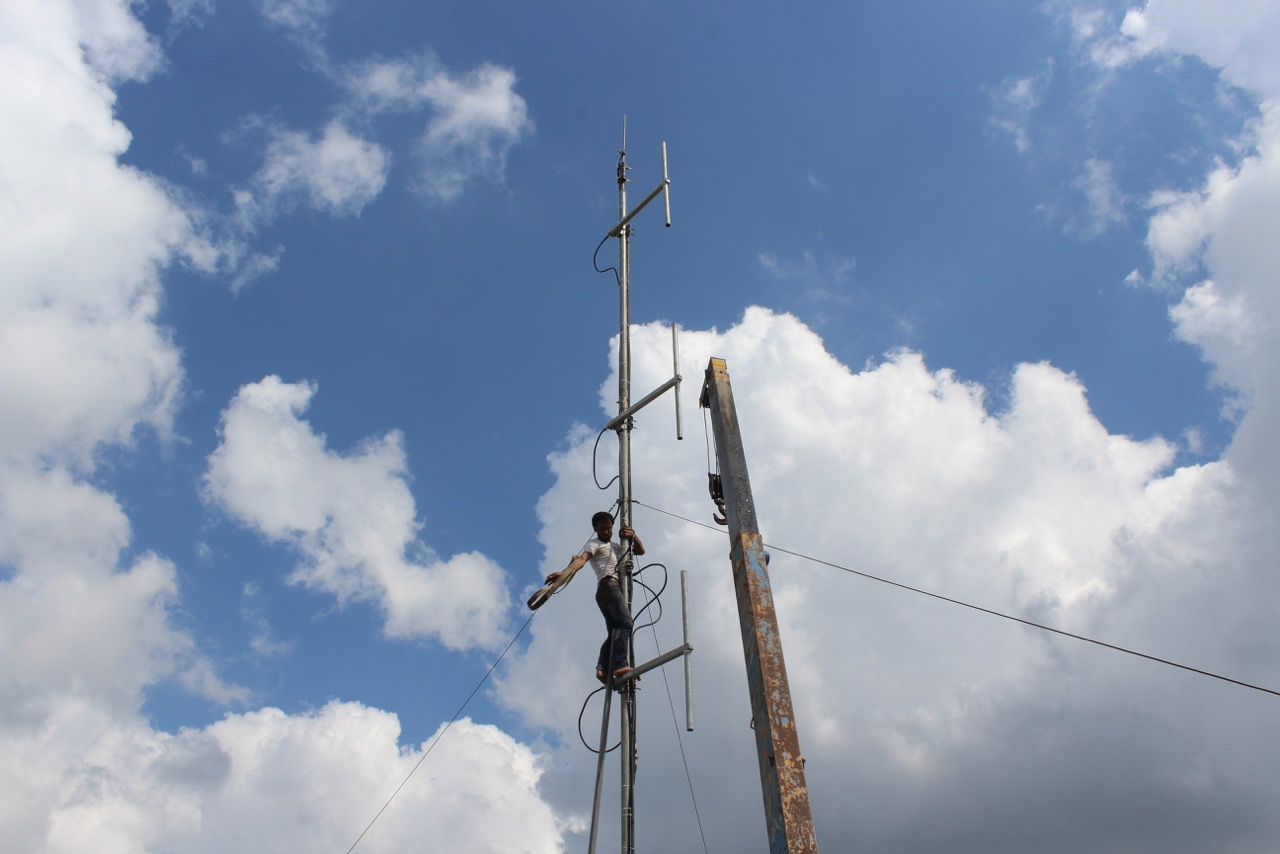
A Syrnet relay antenna

== Operations ==
Syrnet comprises nine geographically separated studios inside Syria's borders, as of December 2015. Two are in locations controlled by the Islamic State of Iraq and the Levant (ISIS), having begun broadcasting prior to the area being taken over. The multiple operational centers allow for local news and announcements and ensures that a disruption to one or two does not lead to a shutdown of production. The broadcast feed is a combination of local content created at the nine studios with external broadcasts, ensuring as many Syrians as possible have access to reports from outside as well as from parts of the country where the situation may be very different. For those with Internet access, and in order to spread the content more widely, broadcasts are also made available for download on the Web.

MiCT employs a number of professional journalists to assist the local stations and reporters.

== Technical basis ==
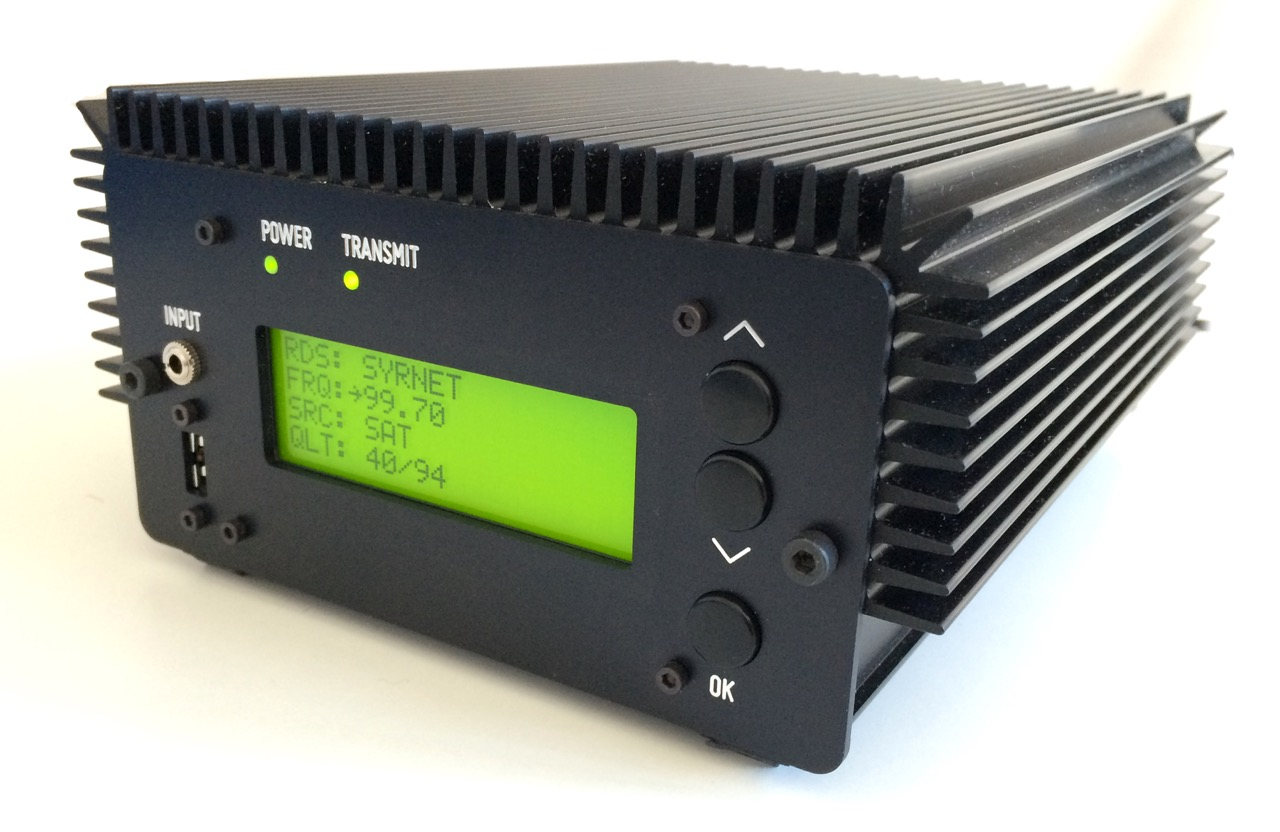
Pocket FM, a portable radio transmitter

The original plan for Syrnet called for standard 1–1.5 kilowatt relay antennas to broadcast over sizable parts of the country. The financial and practical challenges associated with their installation, maintenance, and operation led MiCT to explore the deployment of a larger number of small transmitters rather than small number of large ones, eventually leading to the development of Pocket FM.

Pocket FM is a small, portable radio transmitter developed by MiCT in collaboration with Germany-based design firm IXDS. Due to its small size and design, it looks more like a receiver than a transmitter, making it more difficult to detect, sabotage, or hijack, and much cheaper to run. As of January 2016 Syrnet operates through twelve Pocket FM transmitters, each of which is capable of reaching up to six kilometers, and five larger relays. The Pocket FM units, which can run on solar power or an automobile's 12-volt battery, are equipped with built-in satellite receivers to pick up the Syrnet feed and broadcast it over-the-air.

MiCT collaborates with Syrian activists, journalists, and logistical experts to bring the devices into the country.

== Programming ==
Syrnet airs a blend of content produced in the area around the station, created by stations in other parts of the country, and external programming. Broadcasts include information about the opening and closing of borders, the status of refugees and asylum policies, market prices, regional status updates, and even some entertainment.

Contributions to Syrnet are evaluated to ensure they meet journalistic standards. The organization is committed to moderate opposition and avoids providing a platform for extremists on any side.

== See also ==
- Internet censorship in Syria
- Telecommunications in Syria
