= Radio 6 =

Radio 6 may refer to:

- BBC Radio 6 Music, a BBC Radio station
- NPO Radio 6, the former name Dutch radio station NPO Soul & Jazz
- Radio 6, the former name of Malaysian Tamil-language radio station Minnal FM
