= TEDxAmsterdam =

Independent event series in Amsterdam

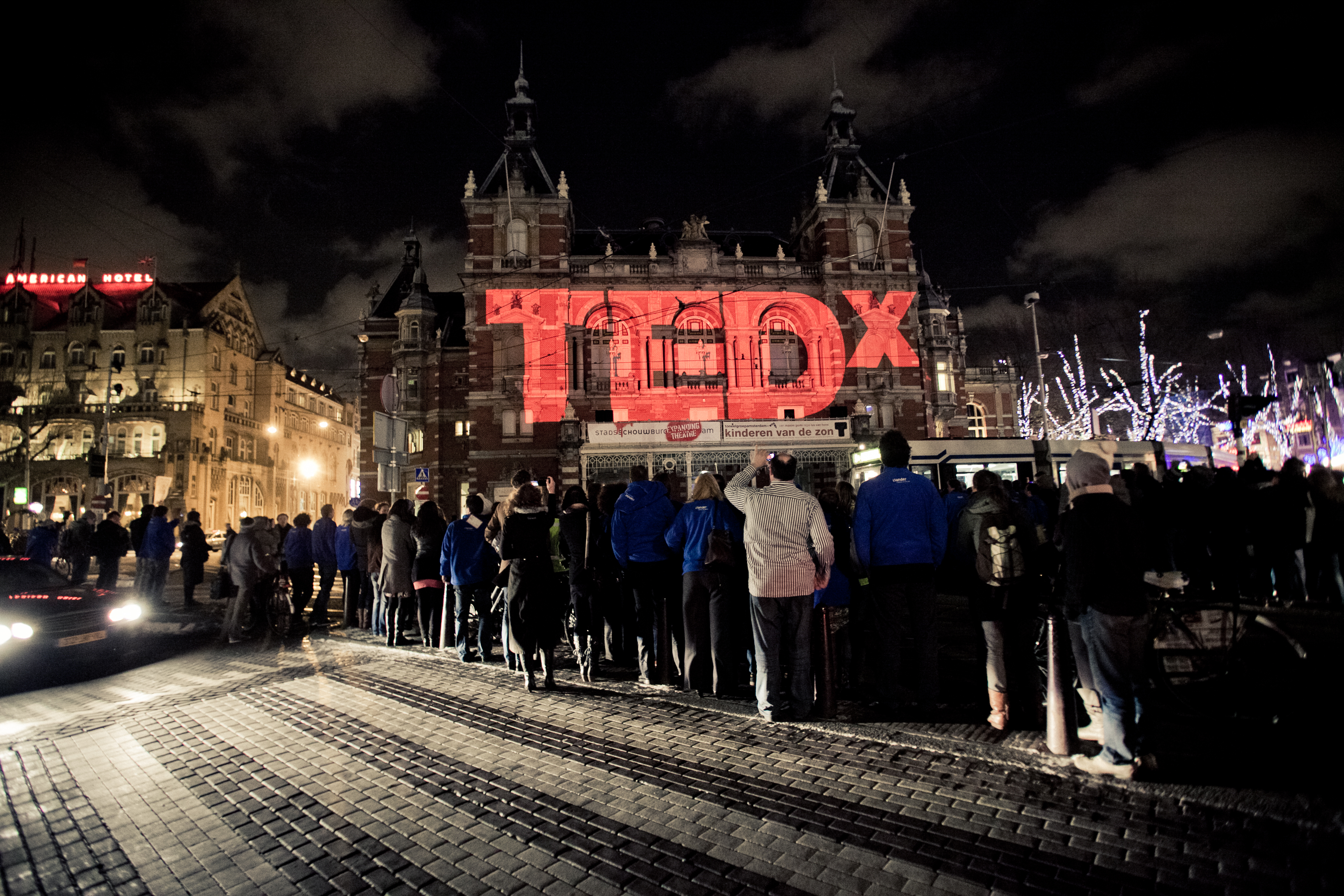
- Status: active
- Country: The Netherlands
- Inaugurated: 2009
- Filing status: non-profit

TEDxAmsterdam is an independent TEDx-licensed event, held annually in Amsterdam, the Netherlands since 2009. The event was founded by Dutch tech-entrepreneur Jim Stolze.

== Past events and speakers ==
=== 2009 — Breakthrough ===
The first edition was held in 2009, with the theme "Breakthrough". In 2010, the official book published for this event won gold at the European Design Awards in 2010.

=== 2014 — Somewhere in Time ===
The sixth edition was held in 2014 with the theme "Somewhere in Time".

Speakers included:

- Kris Berry
