= Saša Vučinić =

Serbian journalist

- Education: Harvard University
- Occupation: Journalist
- Known for: Co-founder of the Media Development Loan Fund
- Notable work: Evropa za nas, Media Development Loan Fund

Saša Vučinić is a Serbian journalist and is the co-founder of North Base Media VC, and co-founder and former CEO and Managing Director of the Media Development Investment Fund, formerly known as the Media Development Loan Fund.

== Early life and education ==
Vučinić graduated with a degree in international law from the University of Belgrade in 1985 and attended the General Manager Program at Harvard Business School in 2000. In 2003, he attended the Private Equity Executive Education Course at Harvard Business School.

== Career ==
=== Non, B-92, and Soros ===
Vučinić began his journalistic career in 1979 as a member of the staff of the Belgrade political newsweekly Non. He became editor-in-chief of Non in 1989. In 1990, he was named editor-in-chief and general manager of B-92, a Serbian radio station.

From April 1990 to April 1993, Vučinić was the general manager and editor-in-chief of Radio B92 in Belgrade, one of the few independent news outlets that operated in Yugoslavia during Slobodan Milošević's regime. He established B92 as a legal entity and was its first CEO. From April 1993 to May 1995, Vučinić worked as a media consultant for the Soros Foundation Network in Prague.

=== MDIF (previously MDLF) ===
In 1995, with seed money from George Soros's Open Society Institute, Vučinić and the late Washington Post journalist Stuart Auerbach formed the Media Development Investment Fund (MDIF), an international non-profit organization based in New York City, Prague, Hong Kong, and Singapore with the goal of establishing a fund to provide loans to independent press organizations in new democracies with histories of government oppression of the media.

In July 2005, Vučinić recorded a TED talk in Oxford, UK, in which he noted that 83% of the people in the world live in countries without independent press and thus don't know what's really going on in their homelands. The “information” they receive is twisted and colored, and as a result they “are deprived of understanding their reality.”

On May 4, 2006, Bruno Giussani of TED reported that Vučinić's idea had become a reality: “for the first time a social cause will be listed on a major stock exchange.” He explained that the MDLF, the Swiss bank Vontobel, and a Zurich firm, responsAbility, were jointly introducing “a security that mobilises private investment to support a free press – basically a bond with a social element.”

By 2012, MDLF had made over $100 million in loans to newspapers, magazines, radio stations and websites around the world, funding over 200 projects in 30 countries; by the same year, over 36 million people in the developing world were getting their news from media financed by MDLF.

Vučinić served as the CEO and Managing Director of MDLF until 31 March 2011, when he stepped down and was succeeded by Harlan Mandel, his deputy managing director for the previous 13 years. MDLF changed its name to the Media Development Investment Fund in 2013.

=== IndieVoices ===
Vučinić founded IndieVoices, a crowdfunding portal that raises funds for independent media, mostly in the developing world.

=== V Media Ventures ===
Vučinić is the founder and CEO of V Media Ventures, which was established in April 2011 in Singapore. It is “a boutique idea and project generator and incubator, operating in the field of independent media. It also serves as a boutique media management and media investment advisory firm.”

== Publications ==
His book Evropa za nas, written with Ljiljana Biuković and Miodrag Pepić, was published by Triangle Press in 1989.
