= Wicked Jazz Sounds =

Dutch musicians' collective

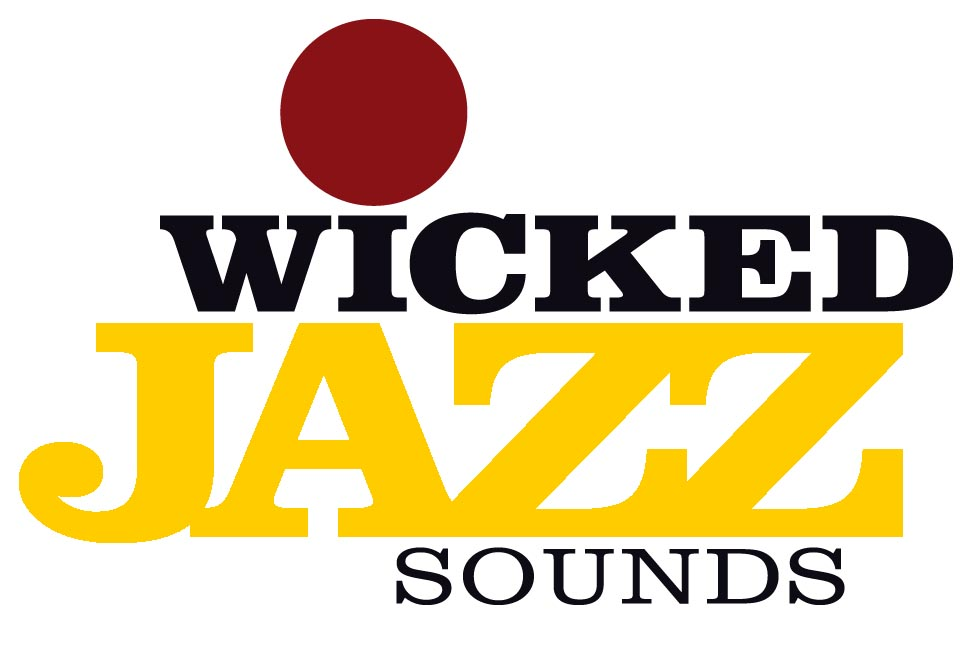
- Formation: 2002
- Location: Amsterdam, The Netherlands

Wicked Jazz Sounds is a Dutch music collective and event organizer located in Amsterdam founded in 2002.

== History ==
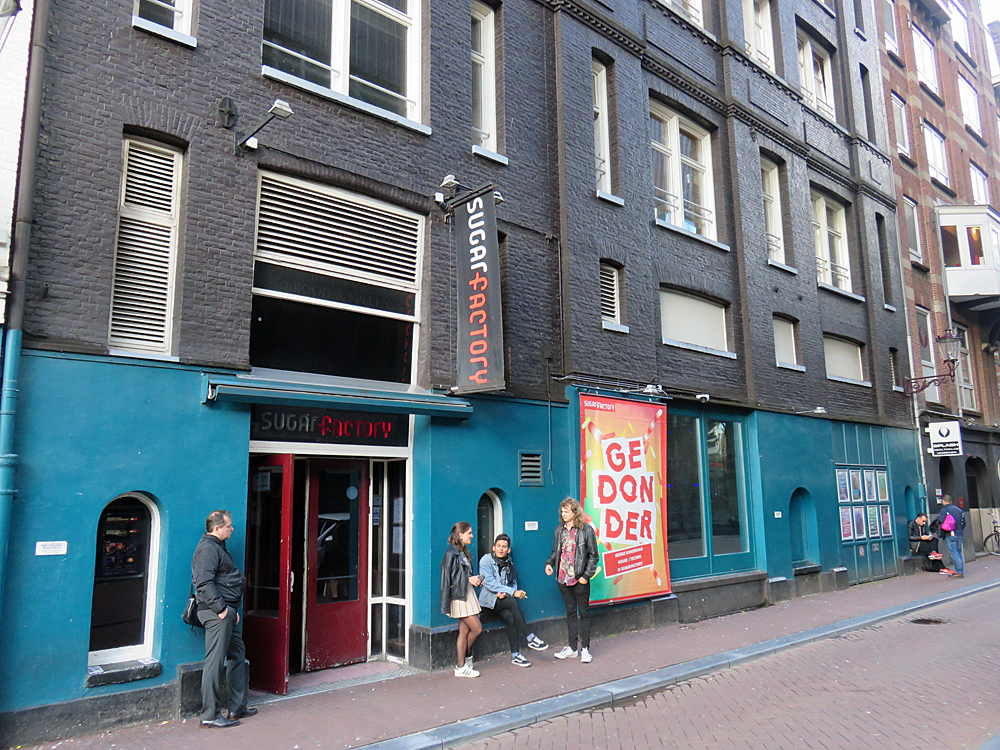
Entrance to Sugarfactory in the center of Amsterdam.

In May 2002, DJs Phil Horneman and Manne van der Zee organised their first WJS event. It took place at Aknathon, in Amsterdam.

Horneman had previously used the Wicked Jazz Sounds name for a show on the Amstelveen local radio station, starting in 1998.

=== Club Zyon ===
Later in 2002, weekly clubnights began taking place at Club 020 (now Club Zyon). WJS organised a special event in March 2004 featuring electronic music by 4hero.

=== Sugarfactory ===
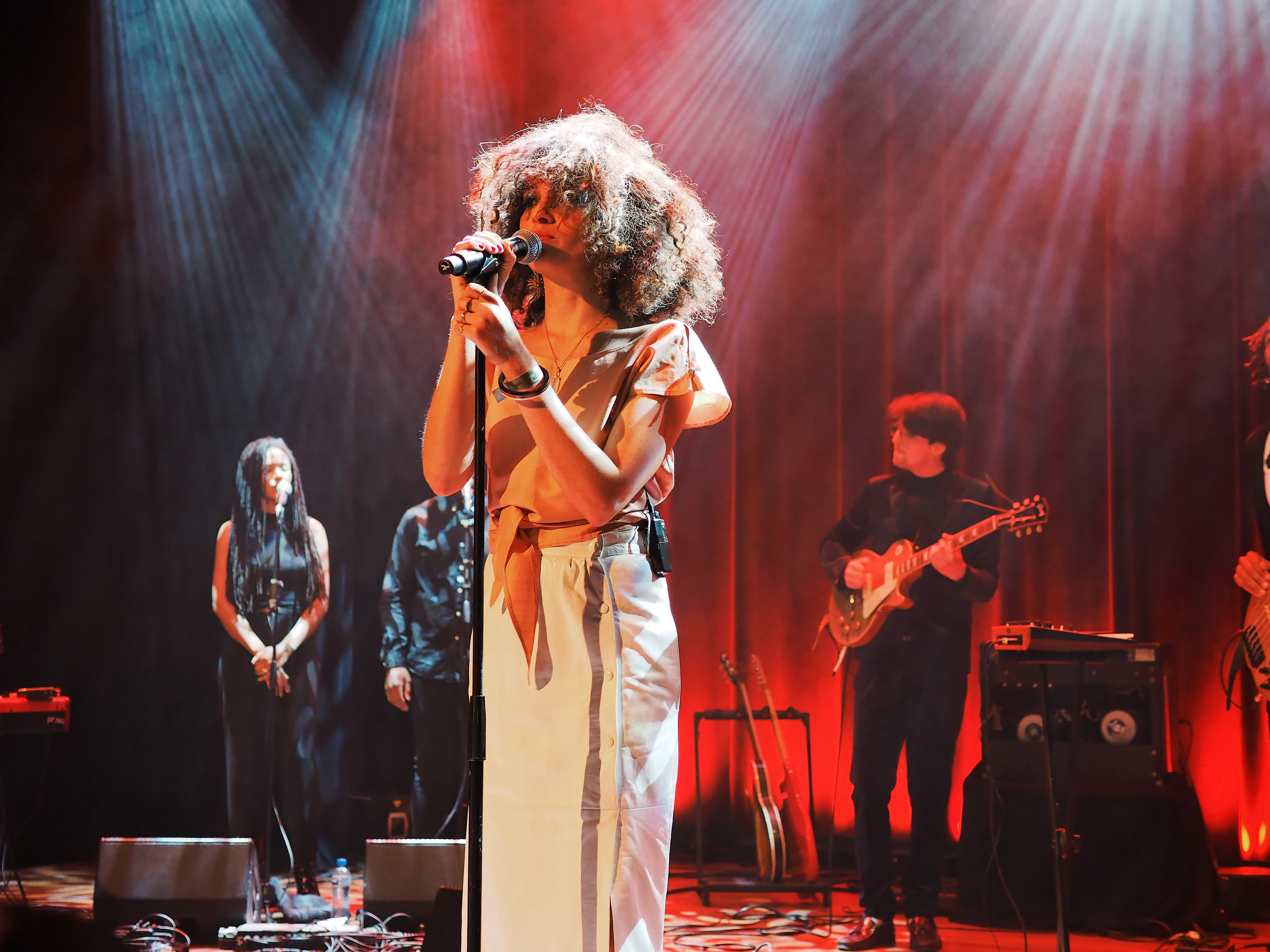
Kris Berry in concert in 2017.

In 2005, WJS moved to Sugarfactory. Their 10-year anniversary was celebrated in May 2012 with an event at Melkweg, which was broadcast live on NPO Radio 6. Earlier that year, the record label Wicked Jazz Sounds Recordings was created, starting with the debut album of Kris Berry.

The collective announced in December 2018 that their 14-year tenure at Sugarfactory would come to an end, due to uncertainty over the venue's future, moving their events across the street to Melkweg instead. The Sugarfactory venue filed for bankruptcy in January 2019.
