= Joshua Olufemi =

Nigerian media and civic technology innovator

Joshua Olufemi (born 22 July, 1983) is a Nigerian media and civic technology innovator. He is the founder of Dataphyte and was the pioneer program director of Premium Times Centre for Investigative Journalism (since renamed The Centre for Journalism Innovation and Development — CJID). Olufemi was the data journalist that represented Premium Times at the International Consortium of Investigative Journalists (ICIJ) for the publication of Panama Papers and Paradise Papers.

== Education and career ==
Olufemi earned a bachelor's degree in Economics and Education from Olabisi Onabanjo University in 2005 and a master's degree in Measurement and Evaluation from the University of Lagos in 2013 before proceeding to the University of Oxford's Saïd Business School where he trained in Global Financial Technology. He is a member of the Institute of Chartered Economists of Nigeria.

Olufemi began his career as a programme officer at the Institute for Media and Society, Lagos. He left the organisation to join Premium Times' Centre for Journalism Innovation (PTCJI) where he served as the pioneer programme director for five 5 years. At the PTCJI, he helped in the launching of a number of social accountability and capacity development platforms across West Africa, including ElectionsNG (Electoral Accountability) UDEME (a budget accountability tool), PressAttackNG, DUBAWA (a factchecking platform) in Nigeria and Ghana, LeaksNG (Whistleblowing and Collaborative Investigative Journalism), Primary Health Care Tracker, PriceBoardNG (a Public Procurement Accountability Tool.

In 2019, Olufemi was selected for the Reagan Fascell Democracy Fellowship at the National Endowment for Democracy in the USA.
