= Sourcefabric =

Czech not-for-profit organization

Sourcefabric is a Czech not-for-profit organisation that develops open source software for independent news media organisations. It is based in Prague, Czech Republic, with branches in Berlin, Germany and Toronto, Canada. Sourcefabric was spun off from the Media Development Investment Fund's Campware project in April 2010. Sourcefabric is an affiliate member of the Open Source Initiative.

== Software ==
Notable free and open-source software developed by Sourcefabric include:

- Superdesk, a headless content management system for websites, aimed at news organisations.
- Superdesk Publisher, a digital publishing platform that exports content from Superdesk and other sources to multiple output formats, including the web.
- Live Blog, a liveblogging SaaS platform for news organisations.
- Airtime (formerly known as Campcaster, renamed in 2011), a radio station automation and management software. Sourcefabric no longer develops the open source version, having pivoted to Airtime Pro, a SaaS platform.

== Legacy software ==
- Newscoop (formerly known as Campsite, renamed in 2011), a content management system for news websites
- Booktype, a book publishing tool, developed in collaboration with the FLOSS Manuals Foundation.
- Citizen Desk, a tool for managing content created by citizen journalists.

== Training ==
Sourcefabric also provides training for journalism students as well as professional journalists on how to use new media tools. It has had training and consulting activities in Africa (Mali, Senegal, Zimbabwe), various EU countries and in the Southern Caucasus (Armenia, Azerbaijan, Georgia).

== Implementations ==
In April 2011, Sourcefabric worked alongside West Africa Democracy Radio to build a news platform for the station using Airtime, Newscoop and SoundCloud integration. TagesWoche, a Swiss online and print newspaper, launched in October 2011 on a new version of the Newscoop platform with the new features Print Desk and Feed Ingest.

== Awards and nominations ==
- The West Africa Democracy Radio project was named as a special distinction winner in the 2011 Knight-Batten Awards for Innovations in Journalism.
- Airtime was nominated as a finalist in the Packt Open Source Multimedia Software Awards 2011.
- Superdesk was nominated for the 2011 Ashoka Google Citizen Media Global Innovation Competition in November 2011.
- Airtime won The Guardian's Digital Innovation Award 2012 in the category Best Use of Technology for Social Change.
- In November 2012 Sourcefabric was one of the winners of the African News Innovation Award for Citizen Desk in Mozambique.
- Booktype won Silver in the Lovie Awards 2012 in the category Web Services & Applications.
- In 2017, Booktype won the Neuland 2.0 jury award for innovation in media and book publishing at the Leipzig Book Fair.
