= Akhnaton (music venue) =

Music venue in Amsterdam, Netherlands

Coordinates: 52.37608°N 4.89413°E

Aknathon
- Formation: 1953
- Location: Amsterdam, The Netherlands

Akhnaton is a music venue in Amsterdam, founded in 1953. The venue is also host to pop-up restaurants, and political conferences.

== Notable events and associated acts ==
- In May 2002, the first Wicked Jazz Sounds event was organized at Akhnaton.
- As of 2016, Burning Man Netherlands Foundation, the first Burning Man affiliate outside the United States, organizes activities and town hall meetings here.
- In January 2020, the venue hosted Bar 0.020, described in Dutch business news De Ondernemer as "the first alcohol-free pub in the Netherlands". The pop-up bar in support of the Dry January campaign, was hosted from January 3 until February 1.
