= West Africa Democracy Radio =

West Africa Democracy Radio (WADR) is a trans-territorial and sub-regional broadcaster, based in Dakar, Senegal. WADR is a project of the Open Society Initiative for West Africa (OSIWA) set up in 2003 to protect and defend the ideals of democratic and open societies by disseminating development information through a network of community radios in the West African sub-region.

The WADR network comprises nearly 40 partner radios in eight West African countries, and a chain of correspondents in ten countries in the region. WADR broadcasts in French and English on 94.9 FM in Dakar, via satellite on Astra 4A to sub-Saharan Africa, and streams to the African diaspora from its website.

In April 2011, Sourcefabric worked with West Africa Democracy Radio to build a news platform for the station using Airtime, Newscoop and SoundCloud integration. The project was named as a special distinction winner in the 2011 Knight-Batten Awards for Innovations in Journalism which identify projects developing interactive journalism.

== See also ==
- List of radio stations in Senegal
