= Sugarfactory =

Music venue and club in Amsterdam, the Netherlands

Coordinates: 52°21′53.32″N 4°52′54.59″E

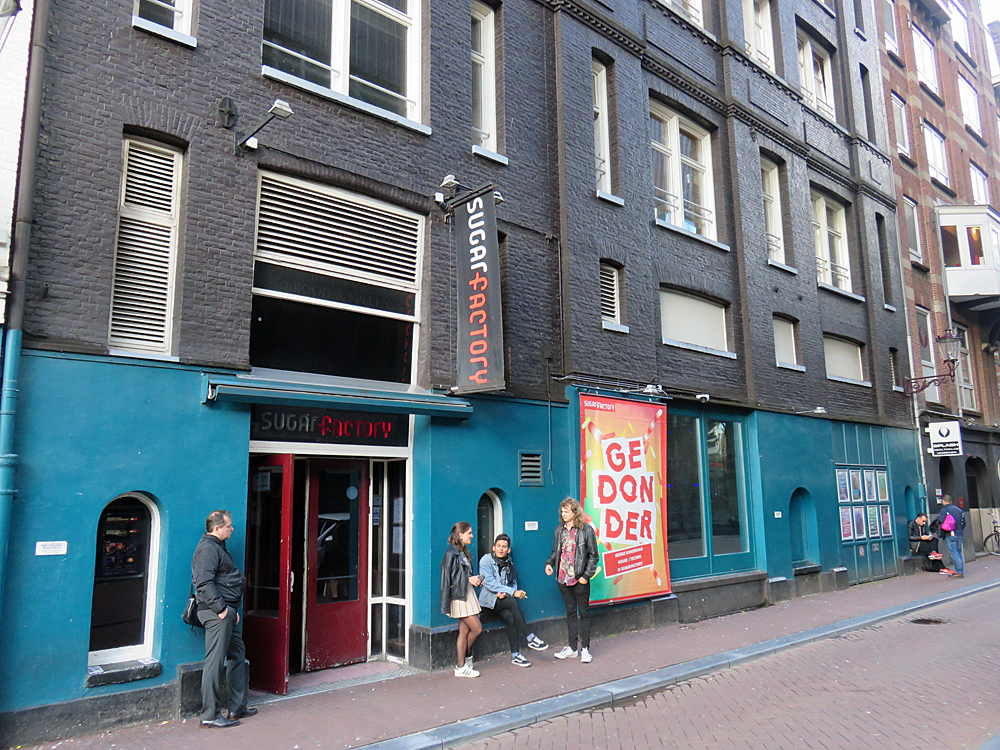
Entrance to Sugarfactory on Lijnbaansgracht, Amsterdam.

The Sugarfactory was a music venue and night club in Amsterdam, Netherlands. It was located on the Lijnbaansgracht, near the Leidseplein in the centre of Amsterdam.

== History ==
Sugarfactory's building is a former sugar refinery. This building and the rest of the street block between Stadsschouwburg, Lijnbaansgracht and Leidsegracht has been used by De Granaatappel as sugar refinery since at least 1854. After multiple city expansions, by 1920 the refinery found itself located in what was now the centre of Amsterdam. This and the competition and crisis after World War I, led to the refinery shutting down and selling its equipment and buildings in September 1920. The building on the Lijnbaansgracht was bought by cookie company De Lindeboom. By the late 1970s, the building was renovated to provide studio spaces for art and later theatre rehearsals. In 2005, Sugarfactory acquired the building and positioned itself as an alternative nightspot. Manne van der Zee became director of Sugarfactory in 2012. The club was recognised by Shamiro van der Geld, night mayor of Amsterdam, as "that other club" in addition to the big two (Melkweg and Paradiso).

In January 2019, the club filed for bankruptcy.

== See also ==
- De Melkweg
- Wicked Jazz Sounds
