= Book sprint =

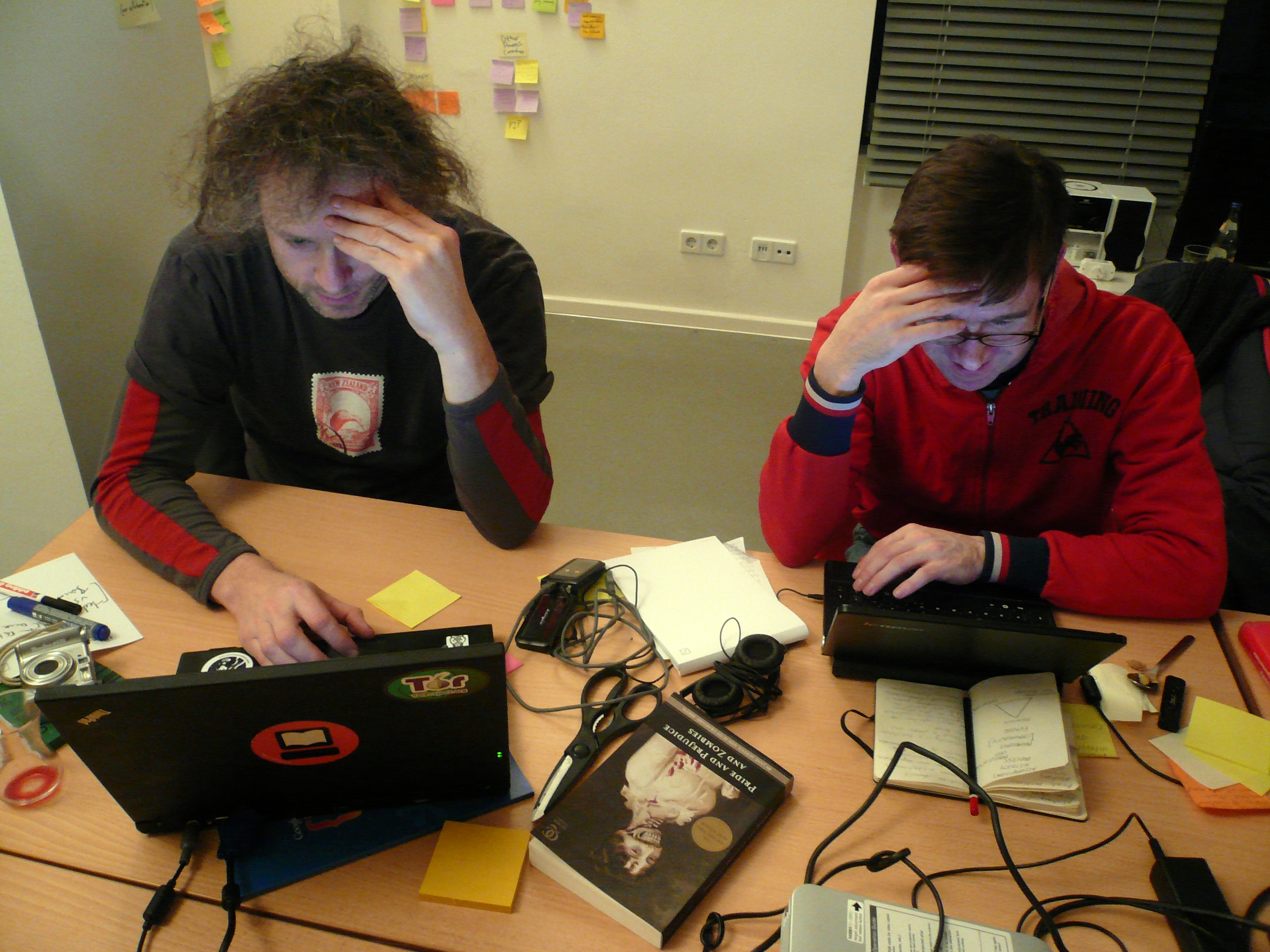
Over 5 days in mid January 2010 the Transmediale festival locked 6 writers and 1 programmer in a Berlin hotel room to collaboratively write a book about the future of free collaboration; the authors started with only the title, Collaborative Futures, and ended the week with a book.

A book sprint is a method of creating a book collaboratively in a short period of time, usually three to five days. Book sprints make use of unconference techniques to ensure that a group of content experts under the guidance of one or more facilitators can not only write but publish a book at the end of the sprint period.

Books are made available immediately at the end of the sprint as e-books and/or with print-on-demand services. Book sprints have been compared to the programming sprints common in agile software development or Scrum.

== History ==
The seed of the book sprint was sown in London in 2005. Wireless network expert Tomas Krag recognized the need for a single, authoritative, online, freely licensed book on the topic of developing wireless internet infrastructure in Africa and other developing countries that could be translated into multiple languages, but he was unwilling to write the book himself using traditional methods. This "book sprint" took several months, however, both in preparation and in post-sprint editing.

Web artist and FLOSS Manuals founder Adam Hyde turned the rough idea of a book sprint into a systematic method, defining and refining the process in the course of many book sprints, and turning the book sprint into a time-boxed event of at most a single week. After learning from Tomas Krag about his initial "book sprint" effort, Hyde recognized the potential of the method, especially for producing Free/Libre/Open Source Software help manuals and handbooks. Hyde facilitated a five-day book sprint in 2008 that produced a how-to book about bypassing Internet censorship as well as a prototype of a collaborative writing platform designed with the book sprint in mind. Since then, book sprints have been held on a wide range of topics, including art, education, governance, science, and software.

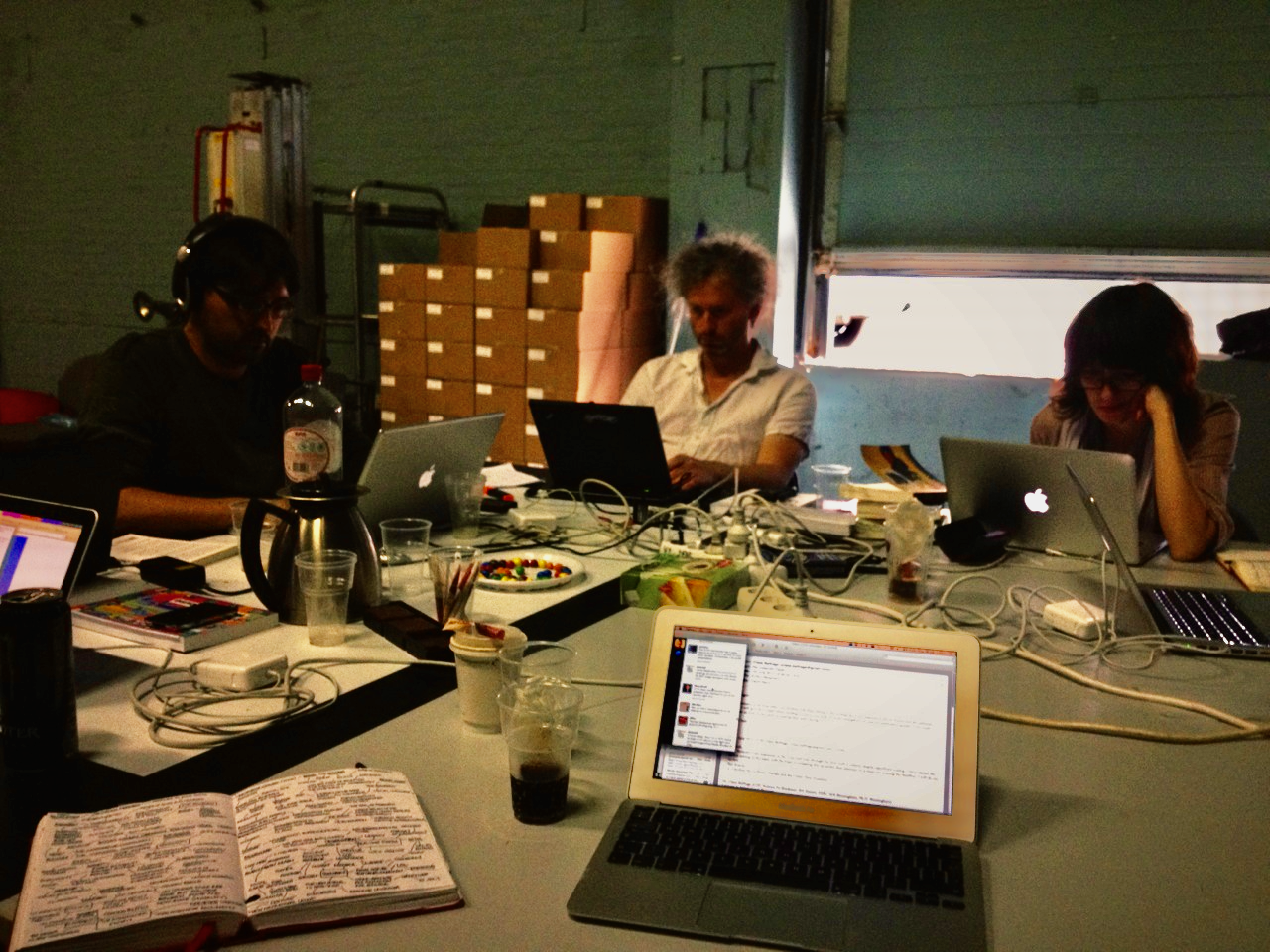
A Book Sprint at V2_ Lab for the Unstable Media in Rotterdam in 2012 producing New Aesthetic, New Anxieties

Book sprints now generally emphasize that participants should not prepare before the sprint and should not continue work after the sprint, that one or more trained and experienced facilitators must be present who do not take part in the writing of the book, and that book sprints are an appropriate method for any topic. According to Hyde, book sprints are best when run by a trained facilitator and using the right kind of collaborative writing software. However, others have used variants of the process to produce books, e.g., Creative Sprint, which spread work over 7 weeks, beginning and ending with face to face sprints.

In 2013-4 "BookSprints for ICT Research" produced a detailed study of Book Sprints, additionally producing five books at book sprints over the course of the study.

== Process ==
In a book sprint, between five and fifteen experts sit together in the same space. Apart from an idea for the topic there are no requirements or contents prepared beforehand. Central to the process is the facilitator who guides the contributors through the process to develop a book in maximum five days. The resulting book is published by the end of the five days through print on demand as well as in different e-book formats. In general, the books are distributed freely, and the main resources are not generated from sales but through sponsors or crowdfunding platforms, for example.

== Some books produced at book sprints ==
- Inkscape, July 2008
- How to Bypass Internet Censorship, November 2008
- Collaborative Futures, January 2010
- On Turtles and Dragons and the Dangerous Quest for Media Art Notation Systems, September 2012
- Understanding Oil Contracts, October 2012
- Imaginary Museums, Computationality, and the New Aesthetic, November 2012
- Introduction to Mallard, October 2013
- Contributors' Guide to BRL-CAD, October 2013
- Open MRS Developers' Guide, October 2013
- Adaptive Collective Systems, November 2013
- Mining Contracts: How to Read and Understand Them, December 2013
- Open Stack Operations Guide, March 2014
- British Columbia in a Global Context (an open textbook), June 2014
- Nameless, November 2014
