= Airtime (software) =

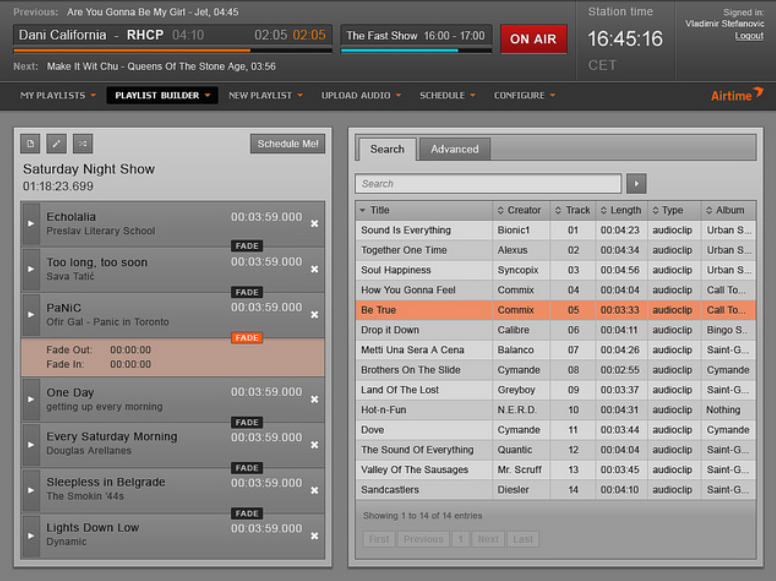
- Screenshot
- Developer: Sourcefabric
- Release: 2011
- Stable release: 2.5.2.1 / 8 April 2015; 11 years ago
- Written in: Python, PHP, JavaScript
- Operating system: Linux
- Available in: English, Czech, Deutsch, Hungarian, Croatian, Serbian, Spanish, French, Italian, Korean, Polish, Portuguese, Russian, Chinese, Greek
- Type: Radio automation software
- License: From 2.5.2: AGPL-3.0-only; 1.6 to 2.5.1: GPL-3.0-only
- Website: sourcefabric.org/software/airtime
- Repository: github.com/sourcefabric/Airtime

Airtime is a radio management application for remote broadcast automation (via web-based scheduler), and program exchange between radio stations. Airtime was developed and released as free and open-source software, subject to the requirements of the GNU General Public License until it was changed to GNU Affero General Public License.

== History ==
The initial concept for Airtime, originally named LiveSupport, and then Campcaster was developed in 2003 under GPL-2.0-or-later by Micz Flor, a German new-media developer. The concept was further developed by Ákos Maróy, a software developer and then-member of Tilos Radio, Robert Klajn, a radio producer at Radio B92, and Douglas Arellanes and Sava Tatić from the Media Development Loan Fund (MDLF). The initial development was financed from a grant from the Open Society Institute's Information Program, through its ICT Toolsets initiative. The development was originally coordinated by MDLF through its Campware.org initiative, now spun off as the independent not-for-profit organisation Sourcefabric.

In January 2011, Sourcefabric announced a rewrite of Campcaster, beginning with the 1.6 beta release. The new product, known as Airtime, replaced the C++ scheduler of Campcaster with Liquidsoap, and includes a drag and drop web interface based on jQuery. 1.6 was released in February 2011 under GPL-3.0-only.

Airtime 1.8.1 was released on 3 May 2011 following up on releases 1.7 and 1.8 in April. The ability to edit shows was introduced, show repeat and rebroadcast made possible, and the calendar improved with reported loading times five to eight times faster. Airtime's default output stream became Ogg, rather than MP3.

SoundCloud support, allowing users to automatically upload recorded shows, was announced in May 2011.

Airtime 1.8.2 was released on 14 June 2011, with improvements to installation, upgrade, file upload limit and the interface.

Airtime 1.9 was released on 10 August 2011, with a new file storage system that allowed users to set 'watch' folders, to synchronise files and to browse their audio archives. Also added were SHOUTcast support, a one line Ubuntu install command and improved front-end widgets. 1.9.4 was released on 27 September, with DEB packages for Ubuntu and Debian.

The Airtime 2.0 release on 25 January 2012 added new features including stream configuration through the browser, live stream preview, and uploading of any audio file to SoundCloud.

On 5 June 2012, Airtime 2.1 added live stream rebroadcasting from remote sources and on-the-fly editing of live shows in a revised Now Playing interface. A bugfix update 2.1.2 was released on 18 June.

Airtime 2.2 added smart blocks, live assist features and new streaming capabilities and was released on 29 October.

Airtime 2.5.2 added a new / rewritten installer, stability improvements and several new APIs. Released on 16 March 2015 under AGPL-3.0-only. 2.5.2.1 is the last version released on 8 April 2015.

=== Stalled Development and LibreTime Fork ===
In August 2016 a representative from the Sourcefabric development team released a statement that their focus for Airtime had shifted primarily to its SaaS offering to increase revenue stream, with hopes to concentrate on the open source project in the future. He mentioned the possibility of forking the project. In 2017, a group of broadcasters made the announcement of a new fork to continue open source development of the software under the new moniker LibreTime.

== Other software ==
=== Campcaster ===
Campcaster is a free and open source radio management application for live broadcasting, remote broadcast automation (via web-based scheduler), and program exchange between radio stations. Campcaster was designed to allow implementation in a number of use scenarios, ranging from an unmanned broadcast unit accessed from remote through the Internet to a local network of Campcaster machines inside a radio station handling live broadcasts and delivering program automation by accessing a central audio storage system.

The initial concept for Campcaster, originally named LiveSupport, was developed in 2003 by Micz Flor, a German new-media developer. The concept was further developed by Ákos Maróy, a software developer and then-member of Tilos Radio, Robert Klajn, a radio producer at Radio B92, and Douglas Arellanes and Sava Tatić from the Media Development Loan Fund (MDLF). The initial development was financed from a grant from the Open Society Institute's Information Program, through its ICT Toolsets initiative. The development was originally coordinated by MDLF through its Campware.org initiative, now spun off as the independent not-for-profit organisation Sourcefabric.

== Awards ==
In September 2011, Airtime was nominated as one of five finalists in the Packt Open Source Awards 2011 in the Multimedia category. In 2012, Airtime won the Guardian Awards for Digital Innovation in the category Best Use of Technology for Social Change.

West Africa Democracy Radio won a Knight-Batten Award for Innovations in Journalism in July 2011, with Airtime cited as part of the platform.

== Radio stations using Airtime ==
On 18 January 2011, Resonance FM announced in Issue #324 of UK music magazine The Wire a partnership with Sourcefabric to help "with testing the software and developing new features."

West Africa Democracy Radio (WADR) launched a news platform that incorporated Airtime on 1 April 2011. Catalyst Radio announced the use of airtime for organising and broadcasting transmission content on 13 June 2011. Stress FM, a radio station based in Lisbon, uses Airtime to program its transmissions.

From 15 July 2012 Airtime uses Russian radiostation of international modern intelligent music Playpoint.fm

== See also ==
- Broadcast automation
- Radio software
- List of music software
