= Bruno Giussani =

Swiss writer (born 1964)

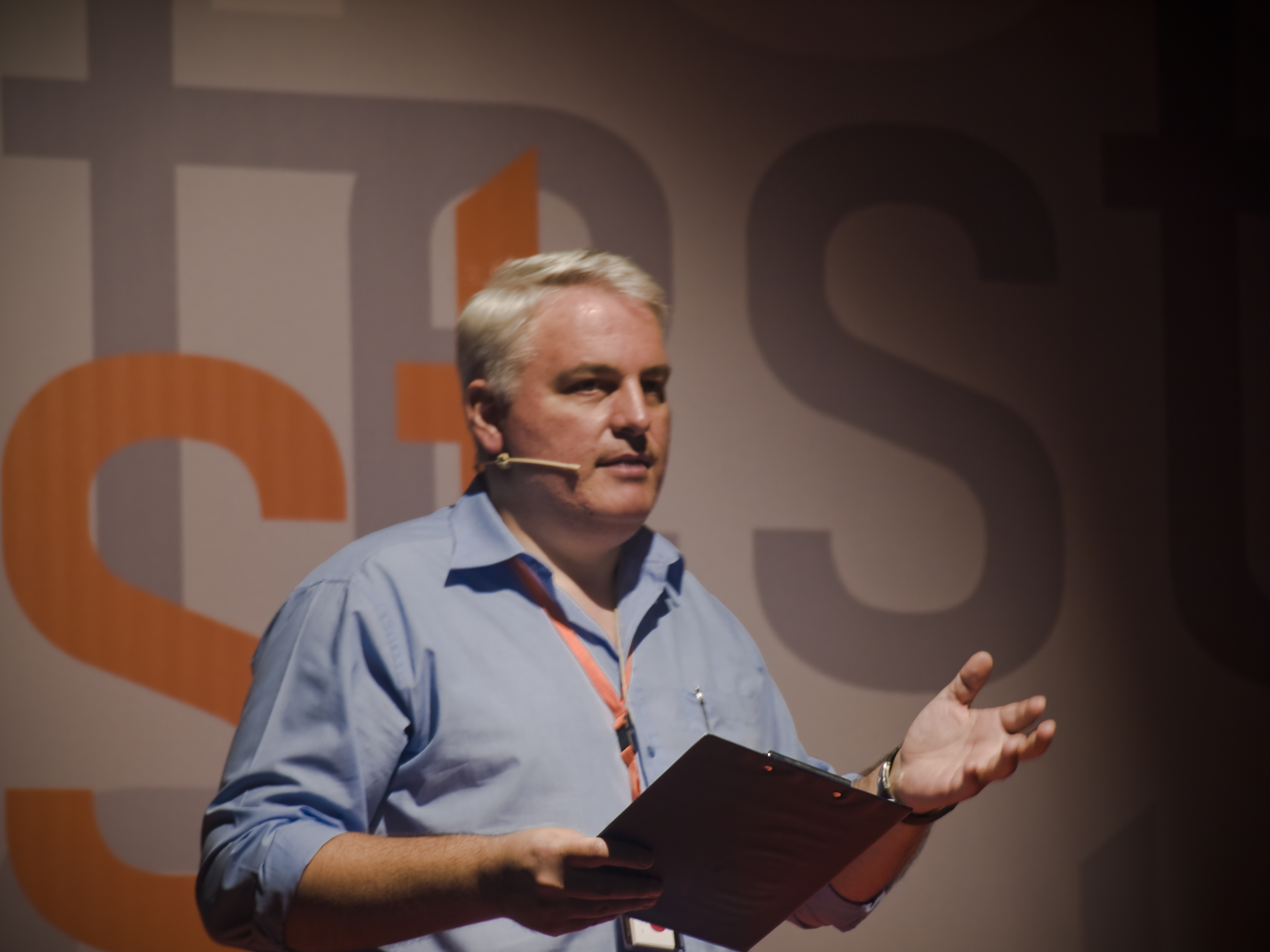
- Born: 1964 (age 61–62); Switzerland
- Website: www.giussani.com

Bruno Giussani (born in Switzerland in 1964) is the International curator of TED. He was for 10 years the organization's European Director and member of its senior team, curating and co-hosting TEDGlobal, TEDSummit and various TED special events. Besides his role with TED, he is the Chairman of FIFDH, the Geneva International Film Festival and Forum on Human Rights, which takes place every year in March, and a member of the Board of Directors of Tinext Group, a Swiss software firm he co-founded.

From 2005 to 2015 Giussani curated and hosted the annual Swiss conference, Forum des 100. Through his firm Giussani Group LLC he advises public organisations, such as the ICRC, as well as private companies, is an author and a frequent public speaker. In 2011, 2012 and 2014 Wired UK selected him as one of the "Wired 100".

== Books ==
He has authored or co-authored several books, favoring a pragmatic, no-hype approach. A reviewer in The International Herald Tribune wrote that in his book Roam. Making Sense of the Wireless Internet (Random House, 2001 and 2002) he "first bursts the bubble of mobile hype and then explains why wireless communications really matters and how it works."
