= FLOSS Manuals =

- Formation: July 2006; 20 years ago
- Type: NGO and Non-profit Foundation
- Location: Amsterdam, Netherlands
- Fields: Software Freedom
- Key people: Adam Hyde
- Website: flossmanuals.net

The FLOSS Manuals (FM) is a non-profit foundation founded in 2006 by Adam Hyde and based in the Netherlands. The foundation is focused on the creation of quality documentation about how to use free software.

Its web site is a wiki (previously using the TWiki and Booki programs, now using Booktype) focused on the collaborative authoring of manuals. The documentation is licensed under the GPL. Although initially the manuals were covered by the GFDL, the material was relicensed to the GPL due to concerns about the limitations of the GFDL.

Anyone can contribute to the material at FLOSS Manuals. Each manual has a maintainer – very much like the Debian maintainer system. The maintainer keeps an overview of the manual and discusses with those interested the structure, etc. The maintainer is also responsible for gathering new contributors together. Not all edits are 'live' – the edits are published to the manual when ready. This is to ensure the quality of the manuals is as high and as reliable as possible and that no new user encounters 'half finished' content.

Manuals are available as HTML online, or indexed PDF. Additionally manuals can be remixed so anyone can create their own manual and export to indexed PDF, HTML (ZIP/tar) or an 'Ajax' include.

In fall 2007, Floss manuals was awarded a 15,000 Euro prize by the Dutch Digital Pioneer fund. It has also been financially supported by Google and NLnet. FLOSS Manuals also received a Transmediale Award for its work on Booki and has also been featured in the Texas Linux Fest 2010.

== List of manuals ==
FLOSS Manuals has manuals for all of the following.

Software	Manuals
CRM	CiviCRM (mobile access - CiviMobile), CiviCRM Developer Guide
Office	Firefox, Chromium, OpenOffice, Thunderbird
Digital signal processing	Pure Data
File system	FSLint
One laptop per child	Reading And Leading With One Laptop Per Child; Make Sugar Activities, XO, Write, Terminal, Chat Activity, Browse Activity, Record Activity, Turtle Art Activity
Free culture	Collaborative Futures
CMS	Newscoop, Plumi
Broadcasting	Airtime
Internet freedom	How to Bypass Internet Censorship, An Open Web, Basic Internet Security
Translation	Open Translation Tools, Video Subtitling
Video	Theora Cookbook, Kino, Avidemux, GTranscode, ffmpeg2theora, HandBrake
Free network services	FLOSS Manuals, Book Sprints, Wikimedia Commons, Archive.org, Freedom Fone
Free software/open source	Google Summer of Code Mentoring
Graphic design	Digital Foundations, Alchemy, Inkscape, Scribus
3D	Blender
HTML editing	Nvu, BlueGriffon
Blogging	WordPress
Media players	MPlayer, VLC, Miro
VOIP	Linphone
File sharing	Azureus
Streaming	MuSE, M3W, Icecast
Video subtitling	Video Subtitling, Jubler
Linux	Linux Command-line Intro
Audio	Audio Production, Ardour, Audacity, Csound
Type design	FontForge
Human Rights	OpenEvSys
Book production	Booktype, Booki User Guide
Performance	UpStage
Collaborative Mapping	OpenStreetMap

== Popularity ==
Some manuals have been selected for inclusion on the VALO-CD, a collection of the best software for Windows.
