= Media Development Investment Fund =

American nonprofit organization

- Abbreviation: MDIF
- Formation: 1995
- Founder: Saša Vučinić and Stuart Auerbach
- Type: NGO
- Website: www.mdif.org
- Formerly called: Media Development Loan Fund

Media Development Investment Fund (MDIF), formerly Media Development Loan Fund, is a New York-registered non-profit 501(c)(3) organization and mission-driven investment fund that provides financing to independent news and information businesses in challenging environments, mostly in countries where press freedom and democratic institutions are under threat. As one of the United States–based groups involved in direct media development, it specializes in impact investing and provides debt and equity financing, alongside business support.

In 2016, MDIF was declared an "undesirable" organization by the Office of Prosecutor General of Russia using Russian undesirable organizations law and put on the list of organisations banned in Russia.

== Mission ==
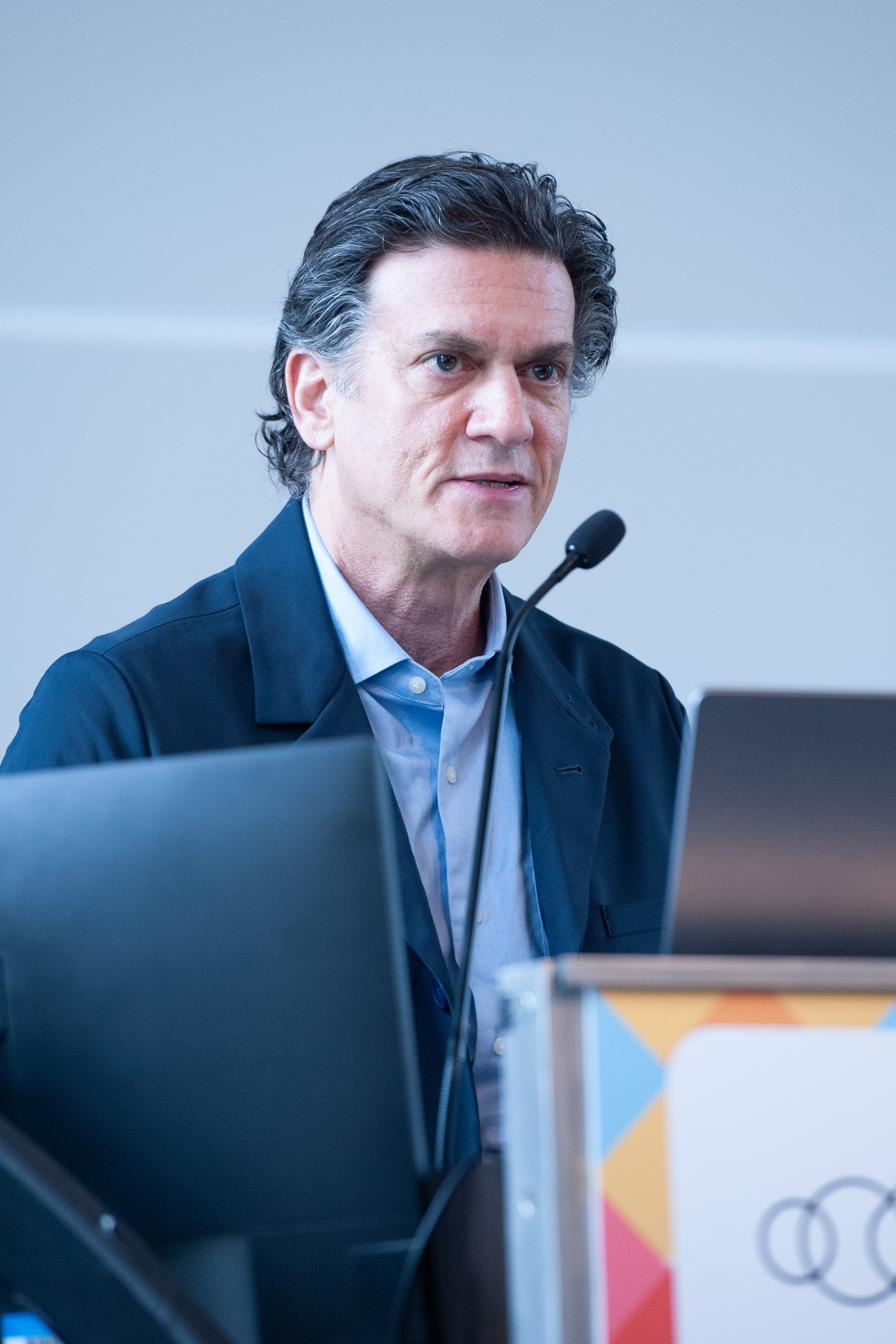
Harlan Mandel, the CEO of MDIF

According to its website, MDIF is a "global non-profit impact investment fund financing businesses that keep society informed and democracy alive”.

== History ==
MDIF was founded in 1995 by Saša Vučinić and Stuart Auerbach, the late Washington Post reporter and editor. According to its website, George Soros provided the initial $500,000 funding in 1995 towards what later became MDLF. The organisation was initially established to support media companies in Europe transitioning from communist systems to free markets, but has then expanded to provide financing to media businesses around the world.

Vučinić served as the CEO and Managing Director of MDLF until 31 March 2011, when he stepped down and was succeeded by Harlan Mandel.

In 2013 Media Development Loan Fund changed its name to Media Development Investment Fund.

In 2016 MDIF was declared an "undesirable" organization by the Office of Prosecutor General of Russia using Russian undesirable organizations law and put on the List of organisations banned in Russia.

== Other activities ==
MDIF is one of the founders of the European Press Prize.

Together with King Baudouin Foundation, Tinius Trust and Mediahuis, MDIF is among European media companies, foundations and impact investors who launched Pluralis, a Dutch limited liability company for independent media organizations across Europe created to protect media plurality.

In 1998 MDIF also founded CAMP (Centre for Advanced Media-Prague), which provided technology support to independent media in developing countries. In 2010, MDIF spun off CAMP as an independent organization, Sourcefabric, whose mission is to provide independent media outlets with the open source software, tools and support they need to produce the news.

In 2017 MDIF acquired a majority stake in South African media company Mail & Guardian. The restructured ownership saw M&G’s Chief Executive Officer, Hoosain Karjieker, acquire a minority stake in the business as part of a Black Economic Empowerment (BEE) transaction. The former majority shareholder, Trevor Ncube, disposed of his equity interest in M&G.

On 30 October 2024 MDIF sold its majority shareholding in South Africa’s Mail & Guardian to minority shareholder and former CEO Hoosain Karjieker and Director Thembisa Fakude.

MDIF report “Media Capture in Europe" and an op-ed by CEO Harlan Mandel written for the EUObserver that drew attention to problem of media capture in Europe, a situation when governments and business interests collude to control and manipulate the flow of news and information, prompted a reply by Secretary of State for Public Diplomacy and Relations Zoltán Kovács. Harlan Mandel then published a reply to the government’s reply.
