= Nationaal Songfestival =

Annual Dutch music competition

- Logo between 1997 and 2003
- Also known as: NSF
- Genre: Music competition
- Country of origin: Netherlands
- No. of episodes: 48 editions

Production
- Production companies: NTS (1956–1969); NOS (1970–2001, 2006); TROS (2003–2005, 2009–2012)

Original release
- Release: 24 April 1956 – 26 February 2012

Related
- Junior Songfestival (2003–present); Eurovision Song Contest (1956–present)

Nationaal Songfestival (Dutch: [nɑ(t)ɕoːˌnaːl ˈsɔŋfɛstiˌvɑl]; lit. 'National Song Festival') was an annual music competition originally organised by the Dutch public broadcaster Nederlandse Televisie Stichting (NTS), and later by the Nederlandse Omroep Stichting (NOS) and the Televisie Radio Omroep Stichting (TROS). It was staged almost every year between 1956 and 2012 to determine the country's entry for the Eurovision Song Contest. The festival has produced four Eurovision winners and eight top-five placings for the Netherlands at the contest.

Due to declining interest in the competition and the Netherlands' poor performance in the Eurovision Song Contest in the late 2000s and early 2010s, it was decided that the Dutch entry for the Eurovision Song Contest 2013 would be internally selected. Nationaal Songfestival has not been organised since. The children's version of the competition, Junior Songfestival, is still active.

== History ==
Anneke Grönloh performing at the Nationaal Songfestival 1964

From 1956 to 1969, Nationaal Songfestival was organised by the Nederlandse Televisie Stichting (NTS). From 1970 onwards, the show was produced and broadcast by the Nederlandse Omroep Stichting (NOS), with the exception of the 2003, 2004 and 2005 editions, which were organised by the Televisie Radio Omroep Stichting (TROS). After the 2006 edition, NOS stated that it no longer wanted to organise the competition. After a two-year hiatus, TROS took over the event in 2009.

Throughout the years, different formats were used to determine which artist and/or song would represent the Netherlands in the Eurovision Song Contest. The competition was usually held in February or March. In 1985, 1991, 1995 and 2002, Nationaal Songfestival was not organised, because the Netherlands would not take part in that year's Eurovision Song Contest.

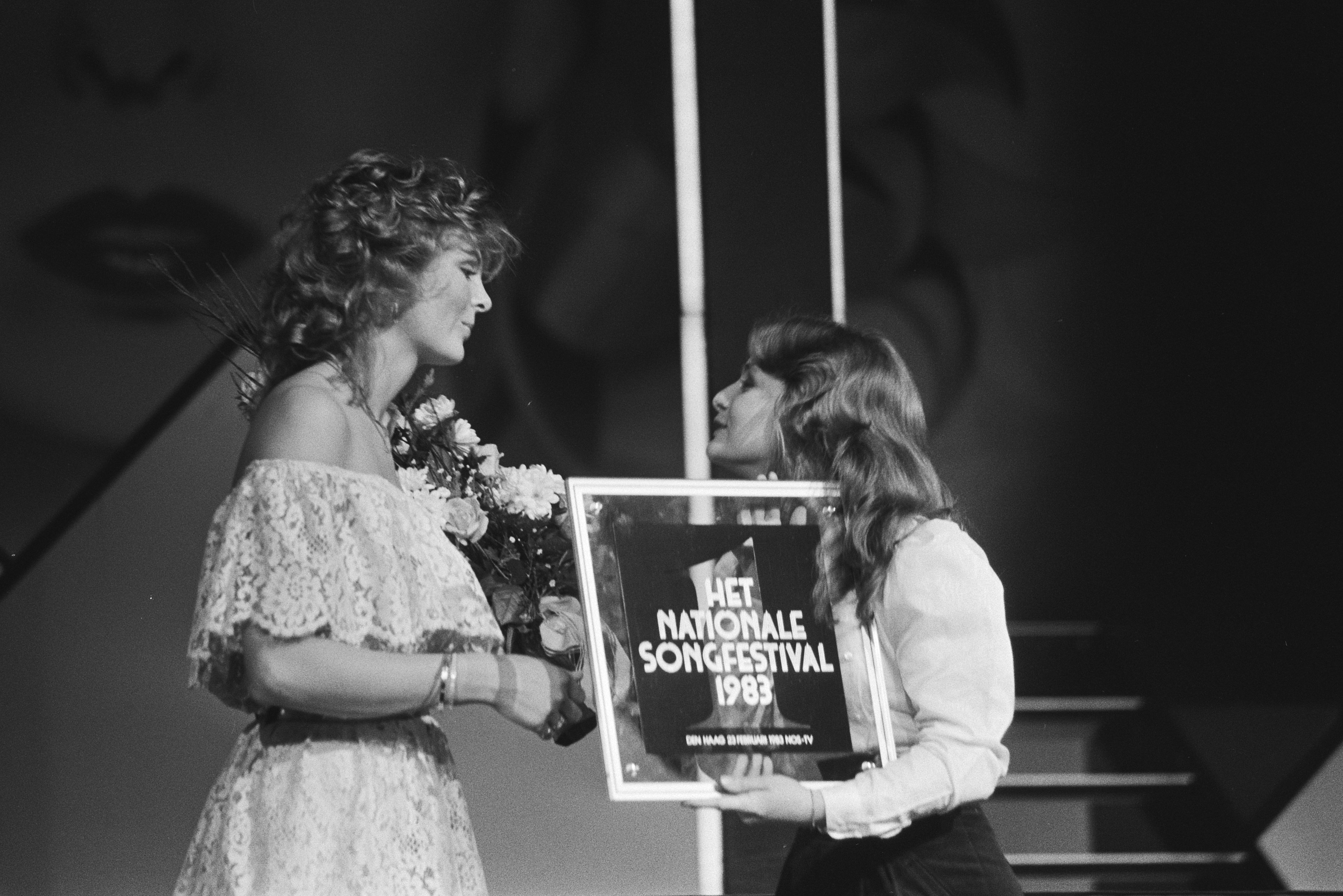
Bernadette (left) receiving the 1983 trophy from Eurovision winner Nicole

In 1961, 1963, 1980, 2007 and 2008, the Dutch entry for the Eurovision Song Contest was not selected through a Nationaal Songfestival, but was chosen internally by a special committee. The 1963 edition of the Nationaal Songfestival had initially been scheduled to take place on 23 January, but was postponed to 11 February and ultimately cancelled due to a strike of the Metropole Orchestra. In 2007, a special edition of the show Mooi! Weer De Leeuw, titled Mooi! Weer het Nationaal Songfestival, was broadcast in which Edsilia Rombley performed three potential Eurovision entries, after which she announced which song she had picked.

=== 2009–2012: Final years ===
After a two-year hiatus, Nationaal Songfestival returned in 2009 as the selection method for the Dutch Eurovision entry; this time to select a song for De Toppers, who had been internally selected by TROS as the Dutch representatives. In 2010, this format was reversed when the song "Ik ben verliefd (Sha-la-lie)" written by Pierre Kartner was internally selected, and the performer was chosen through the Nationaal Songfestival format. Both schlager-style acts failed to qualify for the final of the Eurovision Song Contest and were subject of heavy criticism in the Netherlands.

In 2010, Eric van Tijn – composer of the winning entries "Vrede" (1993) and "Hemel en aarde" (1998) – stated on the talk show Pauw & Witteman that acknowledged composers are no longer involved in the Nationaal Songfestival because "it is not an honour anymore to take part". He attributed the Netherlands' poor performance in the Eurovision Song Contest to the limited budgets of NOS and TROS, which prevented established songwriters from presenting their work in the best possible way and made submitting entries unattractive.

After more disappointing Eurovision results that the Nationaal Songfestival continued to produce in 2011 and 2012, singer Anouk offered to represent the Netherlands in the Eurovision Song Contest 2013 on the condition that she be internally selected and given full creative control over the entry. TROS decided to select her without organising a Nationaal Songfestival. Anouk went on to become the first Dutch entrant to qualify for a Eurovision final since 2004, ending what was the longest non-qualification streak of any country at the time. Following this success, the Nationaal Songfestival format was discontinued in favour of internal selection, which continued to yield further success for the Netherlands, including a second-place finish in 2014 and victory in 2019.

== Voting ==
Nance Coolen and Esther Hart announcing the results of the televote at Nationaal Songfestival 2004

In the 1956, 1957, 1958 and 1967 editions, the winning entry was chosen through postcard voting: the public could vote by sending a postcard with the title of their favourite song to a specified address, with the song that received the most postcards being declared the winner. From 1959 onwards, juries often had a role in determining the winner of the Nationaal Songfestival. Many editions had twelve regional juries, one for each province (and one for the Zuidelijke IJsselmeerpolders prior to becoming a separate province). Other editions had a single (international) professional jury or expert panel.

A notable voting method was used in 1975, when the audience in the Jaarbeurs was asked to put a rose in one of three vases corresponding to the three competing entries. The vase containing the most roses (the one of Teach-In) was declared the winner. Televoting was first introduced in the 1997 edition. Since then, the voting system of the Nationaal Songfestival has often been a combination of jury voting and televoting, largely resembling the voting system of the Eurovision Song Contest.

The voting in the 2010 edition led to much controversy, as it resulted in a tie which – according to the rules – had to be broken by composer Pierre Kartner. Kartner refused to choose between Sieneke and Loekz as he considered them to be "equally strong", and suggested to decide by flipping a coin instead. After much insistence from presenter Yolanthe Cabau, Kartner ultimately chose Sieneke as the winner of the competition.

== Past editions ==
Table key
◇	Contest cancelled

Year	Date of final	Venue	Presenter(s)	Entries
1956	24 April	AVRO Studios, Hilversum	Karin Kraaykamp	8
1957	3 February	AVRO Studios, Hilversum	Karin Kraaykamp	8
1958	11 February	AVRO Studios, Hilversum	Tanja Koen	11
1959	17 February	AVRO Studios, Hilversum	Karin Kraaykamp	8
1960	9 February	AVRO Studios, Hilversum	Hannie Lips and Piet te Nuyl Jr.	8
1962	27 February	Theater Concordia, Bussum	Hannie Lips and Elizabeth Mooy	7
1963	11 February ◇	Theater Concordia, Bussum ◇	Not announced before cancellation	3 ◇
1964	24 February	Tivoli, Utrecht	Elles Berger	3
1965	13 February	Theater Concordia, Bussum	Teddy Scholten	15
1966	5 February	Tivoli, Utrecht	Teddy Scholten	15
1967	22 February (final); 1 March (results)	Kloosterhoeve, Harmelen (final); Theater Orpheus, Apeldoorn (results)	Leo Nelissen	6
1968	28 February	Tivoli, Utrecht	Elles Berger	4
1969	26 February	Circustheater, The Hague	Pim Jacobs	10
1970	11 February	Congresgebouw, The Hague	Pim Jacobs	10
1971	24 February	NOS Studios, Hilversum	Willy Dobbe	6
1972	22 February	Theater Carré, Amsterdam	Barend Barendse	3
1973	28 February	Theater Carré, Amsterdam	Simon van Collem and Viola van Emmenes	4
1974	27 February	Jaarbeurs, Utrecht	Willem Duys	3
1975	26 February	Jaarbeurs, Utrecht	Willem Duys	3
1976	18 February	Congresgebouw, The Hague	Willem Duys	5
1977	2 February	Congresgebouw, The Hague	Ati Dijckmeester	10
1978	22 February	Congresgebouw, The Hague	Willem Duys	8
1979	7 February	RAI, Amsterdam	Martine Bijl	5
1981	11 March	Theater Zuidplein, Rotterdam	Fred Oster and Elles Berger	10
1982	24 February	Circustheater, The Hague	Lenny Kuhr	3
1983	23 February	Congresgebouw, The Hague	Ivo Niehe	10
1984	14 March	NOS Studios, Hilversum	Eddy Becker	10
1986	1 April	De Flint, Amersfoort	Pim Jacobs	10
1987	25 March	Royal Conservatory, The Hague	Astrid Joosten	6
1988	23 March	Congresgebouw, The Hague	Astrid Joosten	6
1989	10 March	RAI, Amsterdam	Linda de Mol	13
1990	10 March	Congresgebouw, The Hague	Paula Patricio	20
1992	29 March	NOS Studios, Hilversum	Bas Westerweel	10
1993	26 March	Escape, Amsterdam	Paul de Leeuw	8
1994	26 March	AT&T Danstheater, The Hague	Paul de Leeuw	8
1996	3 March	Cinevideo Studio, Almere	Ivo Niehe	15
1997	23 February	Marcanti Plaza, Amsterdam	Bart Peeters and Joop van Zijl	6
1998	8 March	RAI, Amsterdam	Paul de Leeuw and Linda de Mol	8
1999	14 March	Studio 22, Hilversum	Paul de Leeuw and Linda de Mol	10
2000	27 February	Rotterdam Ahoy, Rotterdam	Paul de Leeuw	8
2001	3 March	Rotterdam Ahoy, Rotterdam	Paul de Leeuw	8
2003	1 March	Rotterdam Ahoy, Rotterdam (final); Hart van Holland, Nijkerk (semi-finals)	Loes Luca as "Nénette" (final); Harm Edens (semi-finals)	32
2004	22 February	Pepsi Stage, Amsterdam	Nance Coolen and Humberto Tan	24
2005	13 February	Pepsi Stage, Amsterdam	Nance Coolen and Hans Schiffers	24
2006	12 March	Heineken Music Hall, Amsterdam	Paul de Leeuw	9
2009	1 February	Studio 22, Hilversum	Jack van Gelder	6
2010	7 February	Studio Baarn, Baarn	Yolanthe Cabau	5
2011	30 January	Studio 21, Hilversum	Yolanthe Cabau	5
2012	26 February	Studio 24, Hilversum	Jan Smit and Vivienne van den Assem	6

== Winners ==
Table key
1	Winner
3	Third place
◁	Last place
†	Artist/song internally selected

Year	Artist	Song	Songwriter(s)	ESC
1956	Corry Brokken	"Voorgoed voorbij"	Jelle de Vries	Unknown
1957	Corry Brokken	"Net als toen"	Willy van Hemert; Guus Jansen	1
1958	Corry Brokken	"Heel de wereld"	Benny Vreden	9 ◁
1959	Teddy Scholten	"'n Beetje"	Willy van Hemert; Dick Schallies	1
1960	Rudi Carrell	"Wat een geluk"	Willy van Hemert; Dick Schallies	12
1962	De Spelbrekers	"Katinka"	Henny Hamhuis; Joop Stokkermans	13 ◁
1964	Anneke Grönloh^{†}	"Jij bent mijn leven"	René de Vos; Ted Powder	10
1965	Conny Vandenbos	"'t Is genoeg"	Joke Prior-van Soest; Johnny Holshuyzen	11
1966	Milly Scott	"Fernando en Filippo"	Gerrit den Braber; Kees Bruyn	15
1967	Thérèse Steinmetz^{†}	"Ring-dinge-ding"	Gerrit den Braber; Johnny Holshuyzen	14
1968	Ronnie Tober	"Morgen"	Theo Strengers; Joop Stokkermans	16 ◁
1969	Lenny Kuhr	"De troubadour"	David Hartsema; Lenny Kuhr	1
1970	Hearts of Soul	"Waterman"	Pieter Goemans	7
1971	Saskia and Serge^{†}	"Tijd"	Gerrit den Braber; Joop Stokkermans	6
1972	Sandra and Andres^{†}	"Als het om de liefde gaat"	Dries Holten; Hans van Hemert	4
1973	Ben Cramer^{†}	"De oude muzikant"	Pierre Kartner	14
1974	Mouth and MacNeal^{†}	"Ik zie een ster"	Hans van Hemert	3
1975	Teach-In	"Dinge-dong"	Will Luikinga; Eddy Ouwens; Dick Bakker	1
1976	Sandra Reemer	"The Party's Over"	Hans van Hemert	9
1977	Heddy Lester	"De mallemolen"	Wim Hogenkamp; Frank Affolter	12
1978	Harmony	"'t Is OK"	Dick Kooiman; Toon Gispen; Eddy Ouwens	13
1979	Xandra^{†}	"Colorado"	Gerard Cox; Rob Bolland; Ferdi Bolland	12
1981	Linda Williams	"Het is een wonder"	Bart van der Laar; Cees de Wit	9
1982	Bill van Dijk	"Jij en ik"	Liselore Gerritsen; Dick Bakker	16
1983	Bernadette	"Sing Me a Song"	Martin Duiser; Piet Souer	7
1984	Maribelle	"Ik hou van jou"	Richard de Bois; Peter van Asten	13
1986	Frizzle Sizzle	"Alles heeft ritme"	Rob ten Bokum; Peter Schön	13
1987	Marcha^{†}	"Rechtop in de wind"	Peter Koelewijn	5
1988	Gerard Joling^{†}	"Shangri-la"	Peter de Wijn	9
1989	Justine Pelmelay	"Blijf zoals je bent"	Cees Bergman; Elmer Veerhoff; Aart Mol; Erwin van Prehn; Geertjan Hessing; Jan Kisjes	15
1990	Maywood	"Ik wil alles met je delen"	Alice May	15
1992	Humphrey Campbell	"Wijs me de weg"	Edwin Schimscheimer	9
1993	Ruth Jacott^{†}	"Vrede"	Henk Westbroek; Jochem Fluitsma; Eric van Tijn	6
1994	Willeke Alberti^{†}	"Waar is de zon?"	Coot van Doesburgh; Edwin Schimscheimer	23
1996	Maxine and Franklin Brown	"De eerste keer"	Piet Souer; Peter van Asten	7
1997	Mrs. Einstein^{†}	"Niemand heeft nog tijd"	Ed Hooijmans	22
1998	Edsilia Rombley	"Hemel en aarde"	Jochem Fluitsma; Eric van Tijn	4
1999	Marlayne	"One Good Reason"	Tjeerd van Zanen; Alan Michael	8
2000	Linda Wagenmakers	"No Goodbyes"	Ellert Driessen; John O'Hare	13
2001	Michelle	"Out On My Own"	André Remkes; Dirk Jan Vermeij	18
2003	Esther Hart	"One More Night"	Tjeerd van Zanen; Alan Michael	13
2004	Re-union	"Without You"	Angeline van Otterdijk; Ed van Otterdijk	20
2005	Glennis Grace	"My Impossible Dream"	Bruce Smith; Robert D. Fischer	DNQ
2006	Treble	"Amambanda"	Caroline Hoffman; Niña van Dijk; Djem van Dijk	DNQ
2009	De Toppers^{†}	"Shine"	Gordon Heuckeroth; Bas van den Heuvel	DNQ
2010	Sieneke	"Ik ben verliefd (Sha-la-lie)"^{†}	Pierre Kartner	DNQ
2011	3JS^{†}	"Je vecht nooit alleen"	Jan Dulles; Jaap Kwakman; Jaap de Witte	DNQ
2012	Joan Franka	"You and Me"	Joan Franka; Jessica Hoogenboom	DNQ

== Musical styles and artists ==
Conny Vandenbos – "'t Is genoeg" (1965)
The winner of the 1965 edition is typical of the chanson-style songs (luisterliedjes) that were popular in the 1950s and 1960s. The title of the song translates to "It's enough" and is about ending an unhappy relationship.

Ebonique – "So Much Love" (2001)
This disco-influenced dance-pop song was the runner-up of the 2001 edition and is a typical Nationaal Songfestival entry of the late 1990s and early 2000s. Songwriters Tjeerd van Zanen and Alan Michael also composed the winning entries "One Good Reason" (1999) and "One More Night" (2003).

In the early years of the competition, Nationaal Songfestival entries used to be entirely in Dutch, even though the Eurovision rules did not dictate any language restrictions until 1966. The rule that a country's entries must be performed in one of its national languages was first abolished in 1973, which led to the 1974 en 1975 Nationaal Songfestival winners "Ik zie een ster" and "Dinge-dong" being performed in English at the Eurovision Song Contest (as "I See a Star" and "Ding-a-dong"). In 1976, "The Party's Over" by Sandra Reemer was the first song in a language other than Dutch to win Nationaal Songfestival.

The Eurovision Song Contest's language rule was reintroduced in 1977 and abolished once again in 1999, after which the majority of entries at each year's Nationaal Songfestival were performed in English. The 2000 edition marked the first time an entry in West Frisian, "Hjir is it begjin" by Gina de Wit, was selected to take part in the competition. In 2003, the operatic pop entry "Turiddu" by Arwin Kluft was the first to be fully in Italian. In 2006, the lyrics of the winning song "Amambanda" by Treble were partly in an imaginary language.

Throughout the years, the competition also diversified in terms of musical styles. In its early years, Dutch chansons and jazz songs dominated in the competition. Later, there was also room for more experimental entries, such as the rumba song "Fernando en Filippo" by Milly Scott (1st, 1966). In the 1980s, the synth-pop genre gained popularity in Nationaal Songfestival with entries such as "Rechtop in de wind" (1st, 1987) and "Shangri-la" (1st, 1988), and by the late 1990s and the early 2000s, mid-to-uptempo dance-pop had become a successful genre in the competition. Entries in this genre included "No Goodbyes" by Linda Wagenmakers (1st, 2000), "So Much Love" by Ebonique (2nd, 2001), and "One More Night" by Esther Hart (1st, 2003). In the same period, the a cappella genre made its debut with the entries "Danielle... la plus belle" (3rd, 2001) and "Celeste" (5th, 2004).

While many established artists, such as Patricia Paay (1969), Bonnie St. Claire (1970, 1977, 1982), and Gordon (1990, 2003), have participated in Nationaal Songfestival, the competition has also been a stage for new talent. Notable newcomers included Justine Pelmelay (1989), Marlayne (1999), Ben and Dean Saunders (2003), and Waylon (2005).

== See also ==
- Dansk Melodi Grand Prix
- Liet International
- Melodi Grand Prix
- Melodifestivalen
- Regio Songfestival
- Sanremo Music Festival
