= Netherlands in the Eurovision Song Contest 2007 =

- Eurovision Song Contest 2007
- Participating broadcaster: Nederlandse Omroep Stichting (NOS)
- Country: Netherlands
- Selection process: Internal selection
- Announcement date: Artist: 16 December 2006; Song: 11 February 2007

Competing entry
- Song: "On Top of the World"
- Artist: Edsilia Rombley
- Songwriters: Tjeerd Oosterhuis; Martin Gijzemijter; Maarten ten Hove

Placement
- Semi-final result: Failed to qualify (21st)

Participation chronology

The Netherlands was represented at the Eurovision Song Contest 2007 with the song "On Top of the World", written by Tjeerd Oosterhuis, Martin Gijzemijter, and Maarten ten Hove, and performed by Edsilia Rombley. The Dutch participating broadcaster, Nederlandse Omroep Stichting (NOS), internally selected its entry for the contest. Rombley had already represented the Netherlands in 1998 placing third with the song "Hemel en aarde". Rombley's appointment was announced on 16 December 2006. Three potential songs were presented to the public on 11 February 2007 during the special programme Mooi! Weer het Nationaal Songfestival where the selected song "Nooit meer zonder jou" was announced. The song was later translated from Dutch to English for the Eurovision Song Contest and was titled "On Top of the World".

The Netherlands competed in the semi-final of the Eurovision Song Contest which took place on 10 May 2007. Performing during the show in position 10, "On Top of the World" was not announced among the top 10 entries of the semi-final and therefore did not qualify to compete in the final. It was later revealed that the Netherlands placed twenty-first out of the 28 participating countries in the semi-final with 38 points.

== Background ==
Prior to the 2007 contest, Nederlandse Televisie Stichting (NTS) until 1969, and Nederlandse Omroep Stichting (NOS) since 1970, had participated in the Eurovision Song Contest representing the Netherlands forty-seven times since NTS début in 1956. They have won the contest four times: in 1957 with the song "Net als toen" performed by Corry Brokken; in 1959 with the song "'n Beetje" performed by Teddy Scholten; in 1969 as one of four countries to tie for first place with "De troubadour" performed by Lenny Kuhr; and finally in 1975 with "Ding-a-dong" performed by the group Teach-In. Following the introduction of semi-finals for the 2004 contest, the Netherlands had featured in only one final. Their least successful result has been last place, achieved on four occasions, most recently in 1968. The Netherlands has also received nul points on two occasions; in 1962 and in 1963.

As part of its duties as participating broadcaster, NOS organises the selection of its entry in the Eurovision Song Contest and broadcasts the event in the country. The Dutch broadcaster has used various methods to select its entry in the past, such as the Nationaal Songfestival, a live televised national final to choose the performer, song or both to compete at Eurovision. However, internal selections have also been held on occasion. In 2006, NOS has organised Nationaal Songfestival in order to select the entry for the contest, however for 2007, the broadcaster opted to internally select the entry.

== Before Eurovision ==
=== Internal selection ===
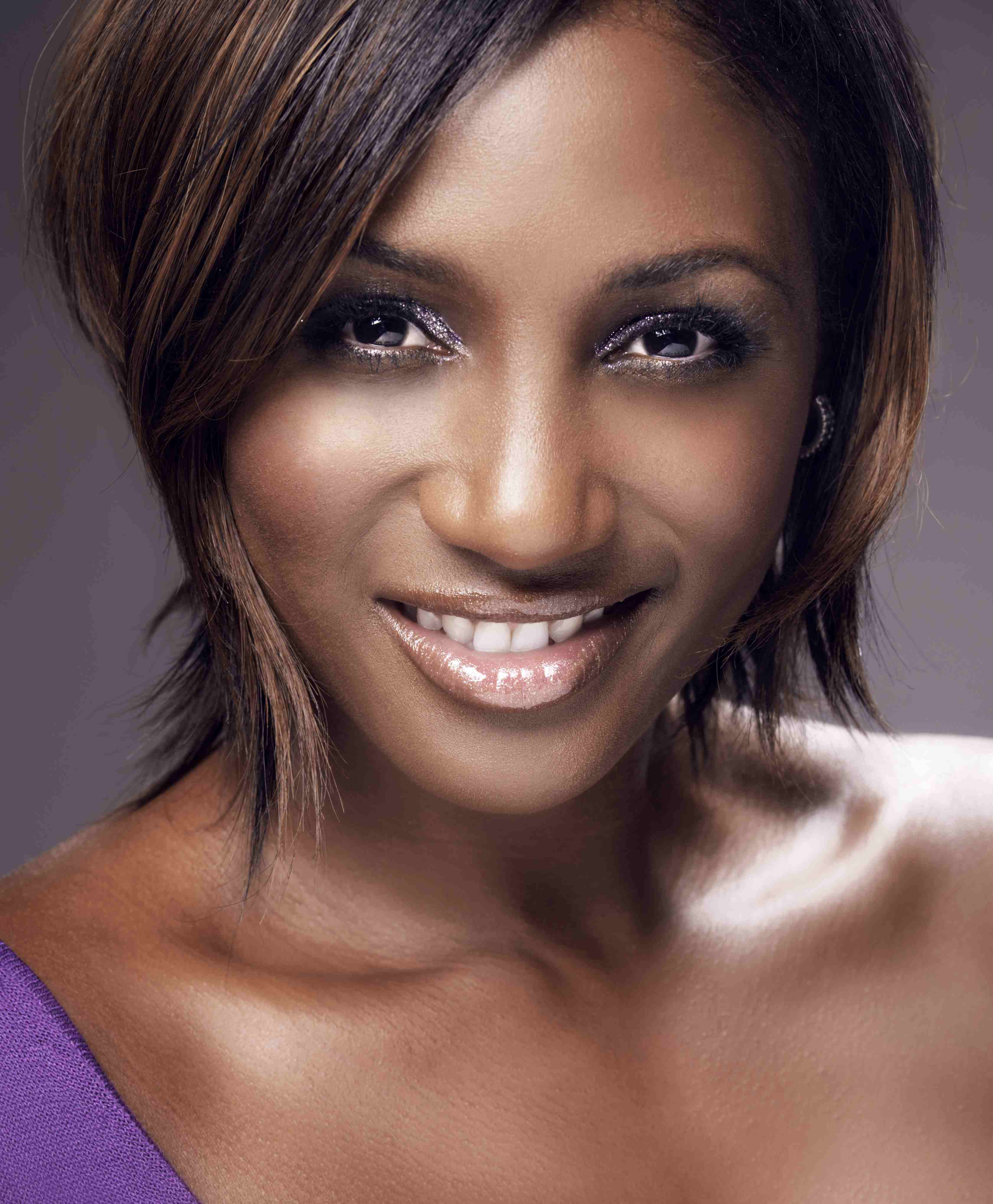
Edsilia Rombley was internally selected to represent the Netherlands in the Eurovision Song Contest 2007

Following Treble's failure to qualify to the final in 2006 with the song "Amambanda", the NOS internally selected both the artist and song for the Eurovision Song Contest 2007. On 16 December 2006, NOS announced during the Nederland 1 programme Mooi! Weer De Leeuw, hosted by Paul de Leeuw, that they had selected singer Edsilia Rombley to represent the Netherlands at the 2007 contest. Edsilia Rombley had previously represented the Netherlands in 1998, placing fourth with the song "Hemel en aarde". During her interview on Mooi! Weer De Leeuw, Rombley revealed that she would perform three to four songs from her upcoming album Meer dan ooit during a special broadcast of the programme, one of them which she would select in consultation with her record company Universal Music as her Eurovision song.

On 11 February 2007, Edsilia Rombley performed three songs during a special broadcast of Mooi! Weer De Leeuw, titled Mooi! Weer het Nationaal Songfestival, and "Nooit meer zonder jou" was ultimately announced as her Eurovision entry. A panel consisting of Cornald Maas, Mikko Jokela, Martijn van Raaij, Marlies van Zeeland, Kees van Twist and Johannes Snippe provided feedback regarding the songs, while past Dutch Eurovision entrants Milly Scott (1966), Ben Cramer (1973), Bill van Dijk (1982), Justine Pelmelay (1989), Maywood (1990), Mrs. Einstein (1997), Linda Wagenmakers (2000), and Glennis Grace (2005) were also present during the programme, which was watched by 1.454 million viewers in the Netherlands with a market share of 18.6%.

Songs considered in the internal selection
R/O	Song	Songwriter(s)	Place
1	"Meer dan ooit"	Tjeerd Oosterhuis, Ellert Driessen, Martin Gijzemijter	3
2	"Een keer meer dan jij"	Tjeerd Oosterhuis, Martin Gijzemijter	2
3	"Nooit meer zonder jou"	Tjeerd Oosterhuis, Martin Gijzemijter	1

=== Preparation ===
Even though Edsilia Rombley had previously expressed her wish to sing in the Dutch language, the singer revealed on 5 March during NOS Journaal that she would perform the English version of "Nooit meer zonder jou" at the Eurovision Song Contest 2007, titled "On Top of the World" with lyrics written by Tjeerd Oosterhuis, Martin Gijzemijter and Maarten ten Hove. "On Top of the World" premiered on 15 March during the Radio 2 programme Gouden Uren, hosted by Daniël Dekker.

== At Eurovision ==
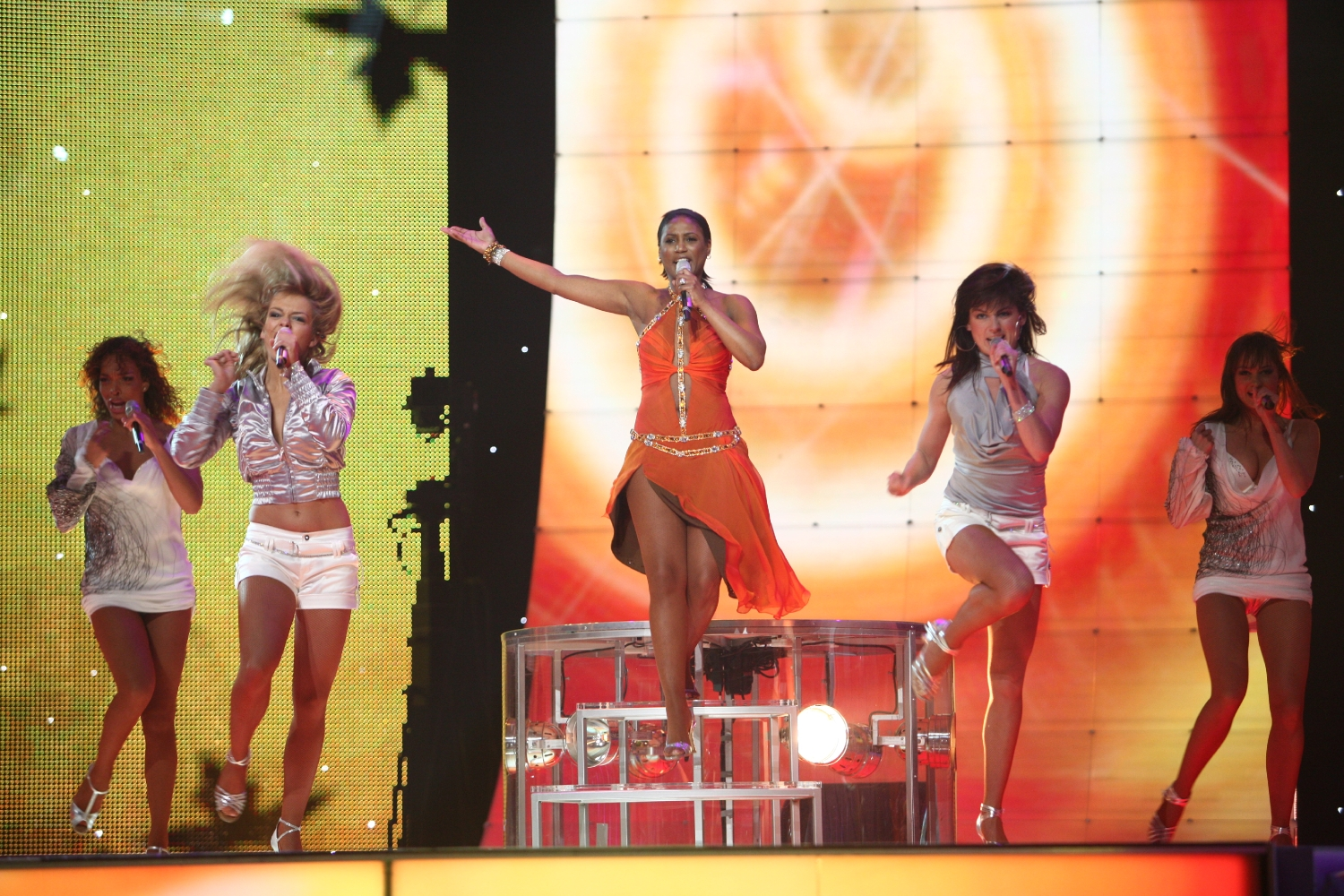
Edsilia Rombley performing at the Eurovision Song Contest

According to Eurovision rules, all nations with the exceptions of the host country, the "Big Four" (France, Germany, Spain and the United Kingdom) and the ten highest placed finishers in the 2006 contest are required to qualify from the semi-final on 10 May 2007 in order to compete for the final on 12 May 2007; the top ten countries from the semi-final progress to the final. On 12 March 2007, an allocation draw was held which determined the running order for the semi-final and the Netherlands was set to perform in position 9, following the entry from Moldova and before the entry from Albania.

The semi-final and the final was broadcast in the Netherlands on Nederland 1 with commentary by Cornald Maas; Paul de Leeuw was also a commentator for the final. NOS appointed Paul de Leeuw and Edsilia Rombley as its spokespersons to announced the Dutch votes during the final.

=== Semi-final ===
Edsilia Rombley took part in technical rehearsals on 3 and 5 May, followed by dress rehearsals on 9 and 10 May. The Dutch performance featured Edsilia Rombley standing on a small podium wearing an orange dress and performing together with four female dancers, all of them which also performed backing vocals, and a male dancer. The stage was dark in the beginning but later displayed red and yellow colours with dark leaves set against on the LED screens. The four female backing performers that joined Edsilia Rombley were Charida Jonkhart, Martine Hauwert, Merel Schaftenaar and Thirza Solcer, while the male dancer was Bram Blankestijn.

At the end of the show, the Netherlands was not announced among the top 10 entries in the semi-final and therefore failed to qualify to compete in the final. It was later revealed that the Netherlands placed twenty-first in the semi-final, receiving a total of 38 points.

=== Voting ===
Below is a breakdown of points awarded to the Netherlands and awarded by the Netherlands in the semi-final and grand final of the contest. The nation awarded its 12 points to Turkey in the semi-final and the final of the contest.

==== Points awarded to the Netherlands ====
Points awarded to the Netherlands (Semi-final)
Score	Country
12 points	
10 points	Belgium
8 points	Malta
7 points	
6 points	
5 points	Andorra; Hungary
4 points	Denmark
3 points	Portugal
2 points	
1 point	Israel; Norway; Switzerland

==== Points awarded by the Netherlands ====
Points awarded by the Netherlands (Semi-final)
Score	Country
12 points	Turkey
10 points	Serbia
8 points	Hungary
7 points	Latvia
6 points	Slovenia
5 points	Georgia
4 points	Portugal
3 points	Norway
2 points	Belgium
1 point	Denmark

Points awarded by the Netherlands (Final)
Score	Country
12 points	Turkey
10 points	Armenia
8 points	Serbia
7 points	Bosnia and Herzegovina
6 points	Germany
5 points	Greece
4 points	Hungary
3 points	Latvia
2 points	Georgia
1 point	Ukraine
