= Alan Michael (musician) =

Polish-Dutch singer and songwriter (born 1970)

- Born: Alen J. Matković; 20 July 1970 (age 56); Rijeka, SR Croatia, SFR Yugoslavia (present-day Croatia)
- Origin: Zandvoort, Netherlands
- Genre: Pop music
- Occupations: Singer, songwriter, producer
- Labels: Red Bullet; CBS; Pronit; Arston; WEA

Alen J. Matković (born 20 July 1970), known professionally as Alan Michael, is a Yugoslav-born Polish-Dutch singer, songwriter and record producer. He is known for his participation in the 1987 Sopot International Song Festival and for being one of the songwriters of the Dutch Eurovision Song Contest entries "One Good Reason" (1999) and "One More Night" (2003).

== Biography ==
Matković was born on 20 July 1970 in Rijeka, SR Croatia, SFR Yugoslavia to a Polish mother and a Yugoslav father. He moved to the Netherlands in his early childhood and grew up in Zandvoort, North Holland. Matković began playing piano at the age of six, and recorded his first single when he was twelve years old. His second single, "Is That You", was released by the record label WEA in 1987.

In the same year, he represented the Netherlands in the Sopot International Song Festival with the song "Romeo and Juliet", alongside Maywood with the song "Stay with Me". For his performance, he was awarded the "FIDOF Award". Due to his participation in the Sopot Festival, Matković gained popularity in Poland, and "Romeo and Juliet" was released on single by the Polish record label Arston. One year later, he released his self-titled debut album with the Polish record label Pronit. The songs "Sandy" and "Dreams of Love" from this album also appeared on his second album The Winning Edge, and were released on single by CBS Records International in 1989.

Following the release of The Winning Edge, Matković was signed to the Hilversum-based record label Red Bullet. In 1992, a third studio album, titled One for a While, was released. Despite successes in Eastern Europe, such as a gold record in Poland, Matković never broke through as a singer in the Netherlands. In April 1993, he featured in the television documentary Hoera, een hit ("Hooray, a hit") by the Dutch broadcaster VARA, which documented his efforts to produce a hit in his home country.

A few days before the documentary was broadcast, Matković had competed in the Nationaal Songfestival – the Dutch national selection for the Eurovision Song Contest – as one of the songwriters of the entry "Medeleven", which finished in fourth place. He subsequently began pursuing a career as a songwriter and founded his own recording studio, AM Studios, in Zandvoort. Between 1997 and 2005, he competed in the Nationaal Songfestival six times, winning it twice as a songwriter of the entries "One Good Reason" (1999) and "One More Night" (2003). The songs finished in 8th and 13th place in the Eurovision Song Contest, and "One More Night" received a Marcel Bezençon Award for the best entry according to previous winners of the contest.

== Discography ==
=== Studio albums ===
Title	Details
Alan Michael	Released: 1988; Label: Pronit; Format: LP, cassette
The Winning Edge	Released: 1989; Label: CBS; Format: CD, LP, cassette
One for a While	Released: 1992; Label: Red Bullet; Format: CD

=== Singles ===
Title	Year	Album
"Is That You" / "Love Hit Me"	1987	Non-album singles
"Romeo and Juliet" / "Now Is the Time"	1987	Non-album singles
"Say You Love Me" / "Kocham cię we śnie"	1988	Alan Michael
"Sandy" / "Dreams of Love"	1989	The Winning Edge
"Tenderness" (with Sophie Proix)	1989	The Winning Edge
"Don't Dream It's Over"	1992	One for a While
"The One You Love"	1992	One for a While
"Leef en laten leven"	1993	Non-album single

== Songwriting discography ==
=== Charting singles ===
Title	Year	Artist	Peak chart positions		Co-written with
Title	Year	Artist	NLD (100)	NLD (40)	Co-written with
"Ik wil graag dat je weet"	1998	Noomen	92	—	Belinda Anholt
"One Good Reason"	1999	Marlayne	30	24	Tjeerd van Zanen
"Libera"	1999	Cristina	74	—	Cristina Power
"So Much Love"	2001	Ebonique	54	—	Tjeerd van Zanen
"If I Had You"	2001	Boy Band	40	—	—
"One More Night"	2003	Esther Hart	26	—	Tjeerd van Zanen
"Dance Dance Dance"	2003	Jody Bernal & Alessandra da Silva	45	—	Alessandra da Silva
"She'll Take Your Breath Away"	2004	Charly Luske	40	—	Charly Luske

=== Eurovision Song Contest entries ===
Year	Country	Song	Artist	Result		Marcel Bezençon Awards
Year	Country	Song	Artist	Place	Points	Marcel Bezençon Awards
1999	Netherlands	"One Good Reason"	Marlayne	8	71	—
2003	Netherlands	"One More Night"	Esther Hart	13	45	Artistic Award

=== Nationaal Songfestival entries ===
Year	Song	Artist	Co-written with	Result	
Year	Song	Artist	Co-written with	Place	Points
1993	"Medeleven"	Ruth Jacott	Gerrit den Braber	4	63
1997	"Samen sterk"	Mrs. Einstein	Tjeerd van Zanen	5	57
1999	"One Good Reason"	Marlayne	Tjeerd van Zanen	1	248
2001	"So Much Love"	Ebonique	Tjeerd van Zanen	2	54
2003	"One More Night"	Esther Hart	Tjeerd van Zanen	1	170
2004	"She'll Take Your Breath Away"	Charly Luske	Charly Luske	4	59
2005	"When Forever Ends"	Johnny Rosenberg	Johnny Rosenberg	3	47
