= Franklin Brown =

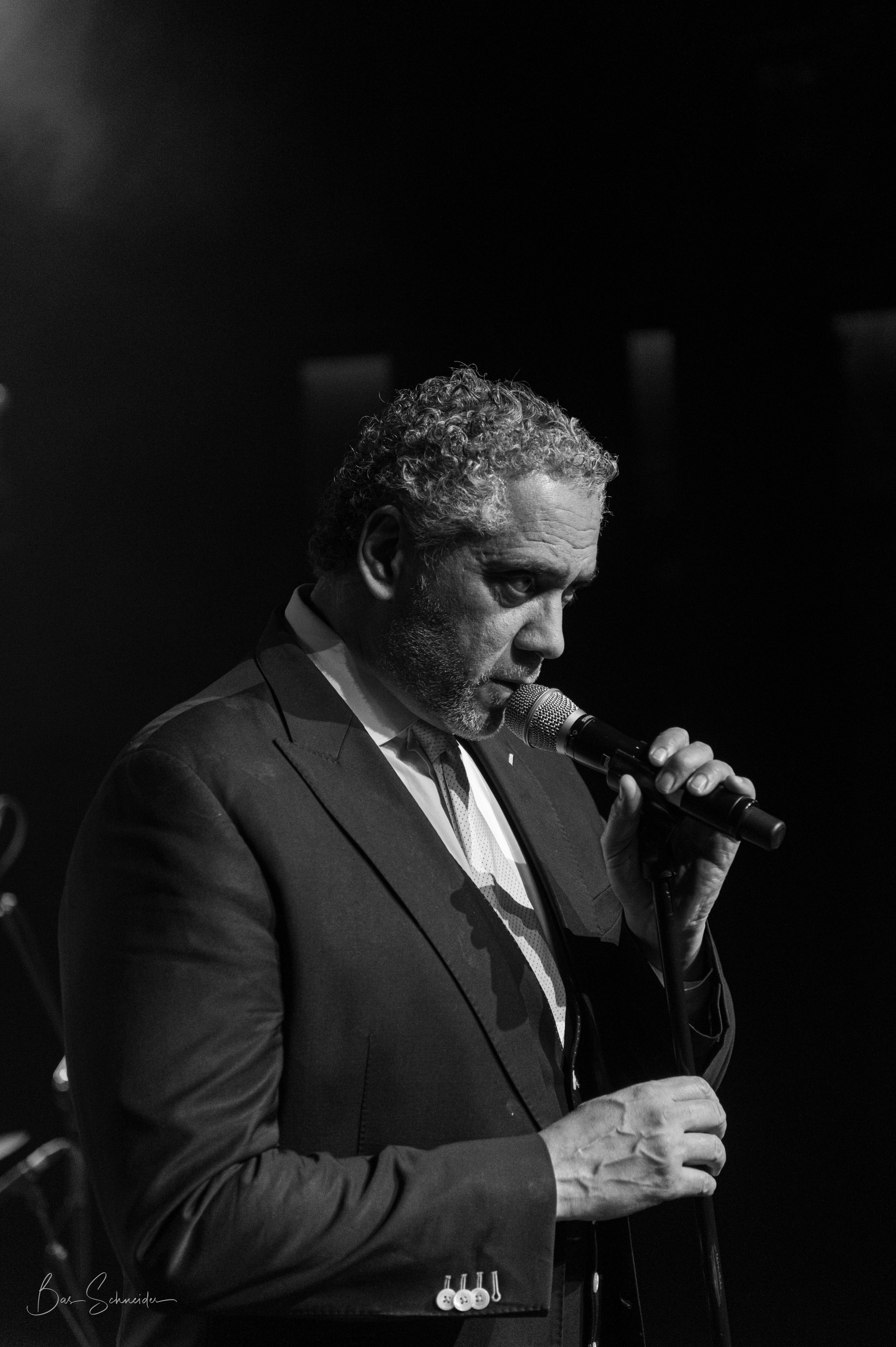
- Franklin Brown in 2022

Background information
- Birth name: Franklin Kroonenberg
- Born: 11 March 1961 (age 64); Rotterdam, Netherlands
- Genres: Pop, jazz, soul
- Years active: 1992–present
- Website: www.franklinbrown.com

Franklin Kroonenberg (born 11 March 1961), known professionally as Franklin Brown, is a Dutch singer and voice actor. He is known for representing the Netherlands in the Eurovision Song Contest 1996, together with Maxine, with the song "De eerste keer".

== Career ==
=== Eurovision Song Contest 1996 ===
In 1996, Franklin Brown and Maxine won the Nationaal Songfestival with the song "De eerste keer". This gave them the right to represent the Netherlands in the Eurovision Song Contest 1996, held in Oslo, Norway. They finished in seventh place with 78 points.

=== After Eurovision ===
After the contest, Maxine and Franklin Brown continued to pursue their own solo careers, only to get back together in 2005, when Brown founded the supergroup The EuroStars. Apart from Maxine and Franklin Brown, this group consists of the Dutch Eurovision representatives Mandy Huydts (of Frizzle Sizzle, 1986), Marlayne (1999) and Esther Hart (2003).

In 2020, Brown participated in a special Eurovision-themed broadcast of the Dutch television programme Beste Zangers, in which he performed the song "One Good Reason" by Marlayne.

== Criminal charges ==
In the 1980s and 1990s, Brown worked as a police officer in Rotterdam. After several female colleagues had accused him of sexual assault, he was fired and received a two-month suspended prison sentence. One of these colleagues, who had sent him sexually explicit e-mails, was later also fired because she had made a false accusation.

== Discography ==
=== With Maxine ===
- "De eerste keer" (1996)
- "Steeds weer" (2007)
- "Balsem voor het hart" (2012)

=== With The EuroStars ===
- "Love Shine a Light" (2010)

=== As solo artist ===
- "Me Again" (2011)
- "Keep Your Eye on the Sparrow" (2011)
- "One Good Reason" (2020)

== Filmography ==
- Frozen II (2019) – Mattias (Dutch voice)

Awards and achievements
Preceded by Willeke Alberti with "Waar is de zon?"	Netherlands in the Eurovision Song Contest; 1996	Succeeded by Mrs. Einstein with "Niemand heeft nog tijd"
