= Dignity (band) =

- Origin: Netherlands
- Genres: R&B, Pop
- Years active: 1995–1999
- Label: Virgin
- Past members: Gracia Gorré; Edsilia Rombley; Karima Lemghari; Susan Haps

Dignity was a Dutch R&B group consisting of Gracia Gorré, Karima Lemghari, Susan Haps, and Edsilia Rombley who departed the band in 1997 for a solo career. Dignity is an abbreviation of Dignified Individuals Giving New Insight To You.

== History ==
Dignity debuted in 1997 with the songs "Talk to Me" and "Hold Me" on the compilation album No Sweat - Dutch R&B Flavor, an initiative to publicize Dutch urban talent. This gave Dignity a record deal.

Dignity's first single "Talk to Me" has become an (underground) urban classic at home and abroad, which today still passes by on the radio, television and in the clubs. The ladies themselves said that they think the video is terrible.

The following year, the single "Nothing Is for Free" and the album Dignity were released. Dignity worked on this album with leading producers such as Rutger Kroese, Mitchel Kroon, Edo Plasschaert, Chris Kooreman and Fabian Lenssen. Many songs were (partly) written by the ladies themselves.

The album received good reviews. The leading music magazine OOR selected the song "The Right Guy" as a favorite and also placed it on the high-quality CD sampler "OORGASM 3". Dignity was also nominated for a TMF Award. In 1999, the group even won an Edison in the category 'Best R&B Act'.

Then the group disbanded. Karima Lemghari remained active in the music industry. She scored a hit with rapper E-Life and then continued solo.

In 2013, Gracia Gorré auditioned for X Factor and was selected for the ten acts for the next round by Candy Dulfer.

== Discography ==
=== Studio albums ===
Title	Album details	Peak	Certifications (sales threshold)
Title	Album details	NL	Certifications (sales threshold)
Dignity	Release date: 1998; Label: Virgin; Format: CD	6	NL: N/A

=== Singles ===
List of singles, with selected chart positions and certifications, showing year released and album name
Single	Year	Peak chart positions		Certifications	Album
Single	Year	NL	BE	Certifications	Album
"Talk to Me"	1997	35	—		Dignity
"Nothing Is for Free"	1998	4	39	NL: Gold	Dignity
"Everything Has Changed"	1998	14	—		Dignity
"The Right Guy"	1999	46	—		Dignity
"—" denotes a single that did not chart or was not released.
