= Edsilia Rombley =

Dutch singer and television presenter (born 1978)

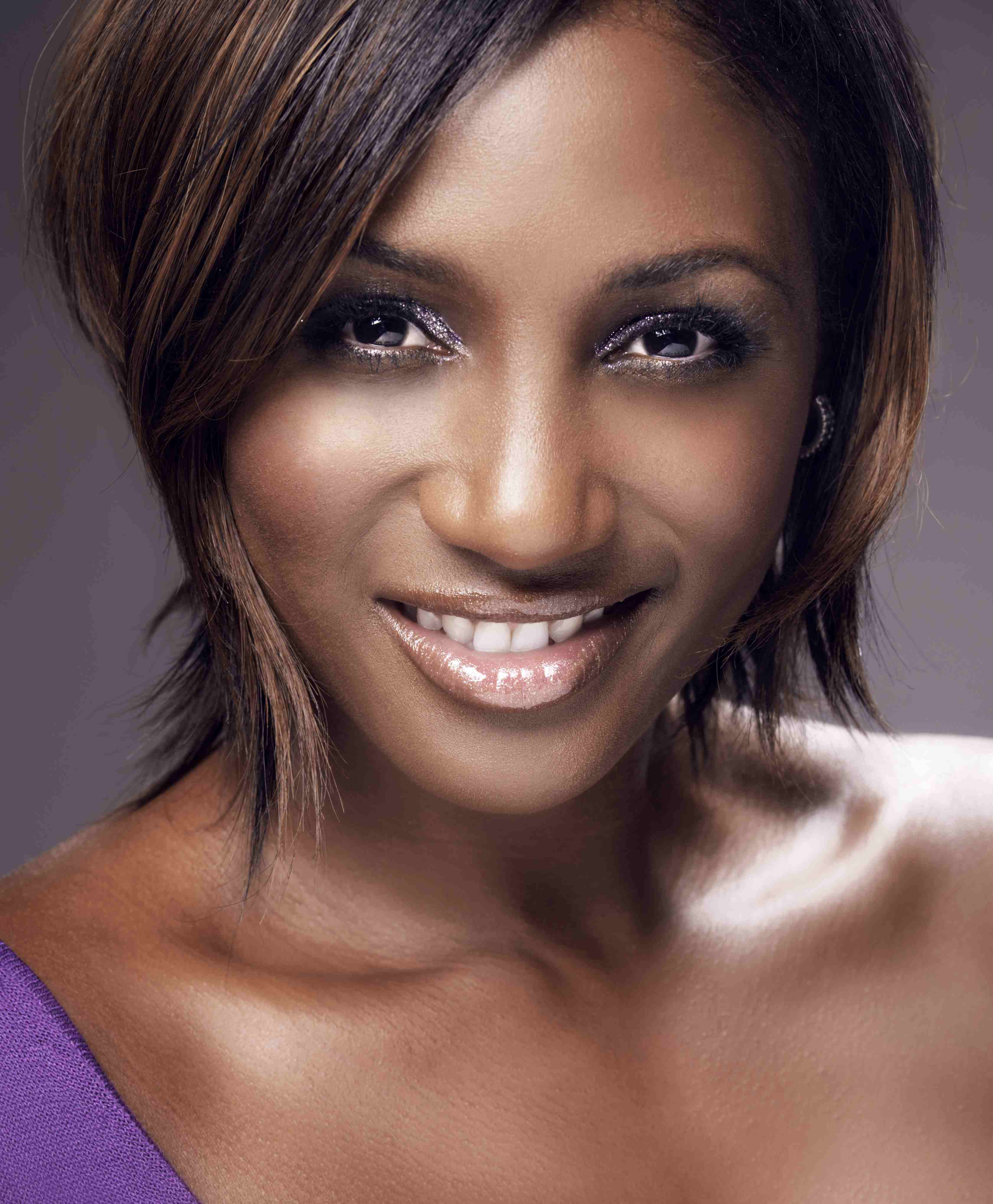
- Rombley in 2009

Background information
- Also known as: Edsilia
- Born: Edsilia Francisca Rombley; 13 February 1978 (age 48); Amsterdam, Netherlands
- Genres: Pop; R&B
- Occupations: Singer; television presenter
- Years active: 1995–present
- Website: edsiliarombley.nl

Edsilia Francisca Rombley (Dutch pronunciation: [ɛtˈsilijaː ˈrɔmbli]; born 13 February 1978) is a Dutch singer and television presenter. She began her career in 1995, as a member of the Dutch girl group Dignity. Rombley began her solo career in 1996, after winning the Dutch talent show Soundmixshow, later winning the European Soundmix Show as well the following year.

In 1998, Rombley won Nationaal Songfestival 1998 and represented the Netherlands in the Eurovision Song Contest 1998 with the song "Hemel en aarde", placing fourth. She later represented the Netherlands in the Eurovision Song Contest 2007 with the song "On Top of the World", but did not qualify for the final. In 2009, Rombley hosted season one of the Dutch celebrity talent show Beste Zangers. She was due to host the cancelled Eurovision Song Contest 2020 and later hosted the Eurovision Song Contest 2021 in Rotterdam.

Throughout her career, Rombley has released eight studio albums and two top ten singles in the Netherlands.

== Biography ==
Rombley was born on 13 February 1978 in Amsterdam in the Netherlands. Her parents were from Aruba and Curaçao (Netherlands Antilles).

=== 1995–97: Dignity, talent show success ===
The career of Rombley started in 1995, with Gracia Gorré, Karima Lemghari and Susan Haps in the group called Dignity. The name Dignity stands for Dignified Individuals Giving New Insight To You. A year later the singles "Talk To Me" and "Hold Me" from the compilation album "No Sweat" entered the charts.

In 1996, Edsilia won the final of the Soundmixshow with a cover version of Oleta Adams' song, "I Just Had To Hear Your Voice". In 1997, her international reputation was established thanks to the profit of the European Soundmix Show, in which she sang the same song. That year she left Dignity and released her first solo single "Baby It's You". In 1997 she recorded her first album "Thuis" which was in assignment and exclusive for Douwe Egberts.

=== Eurovision Song Contest ===
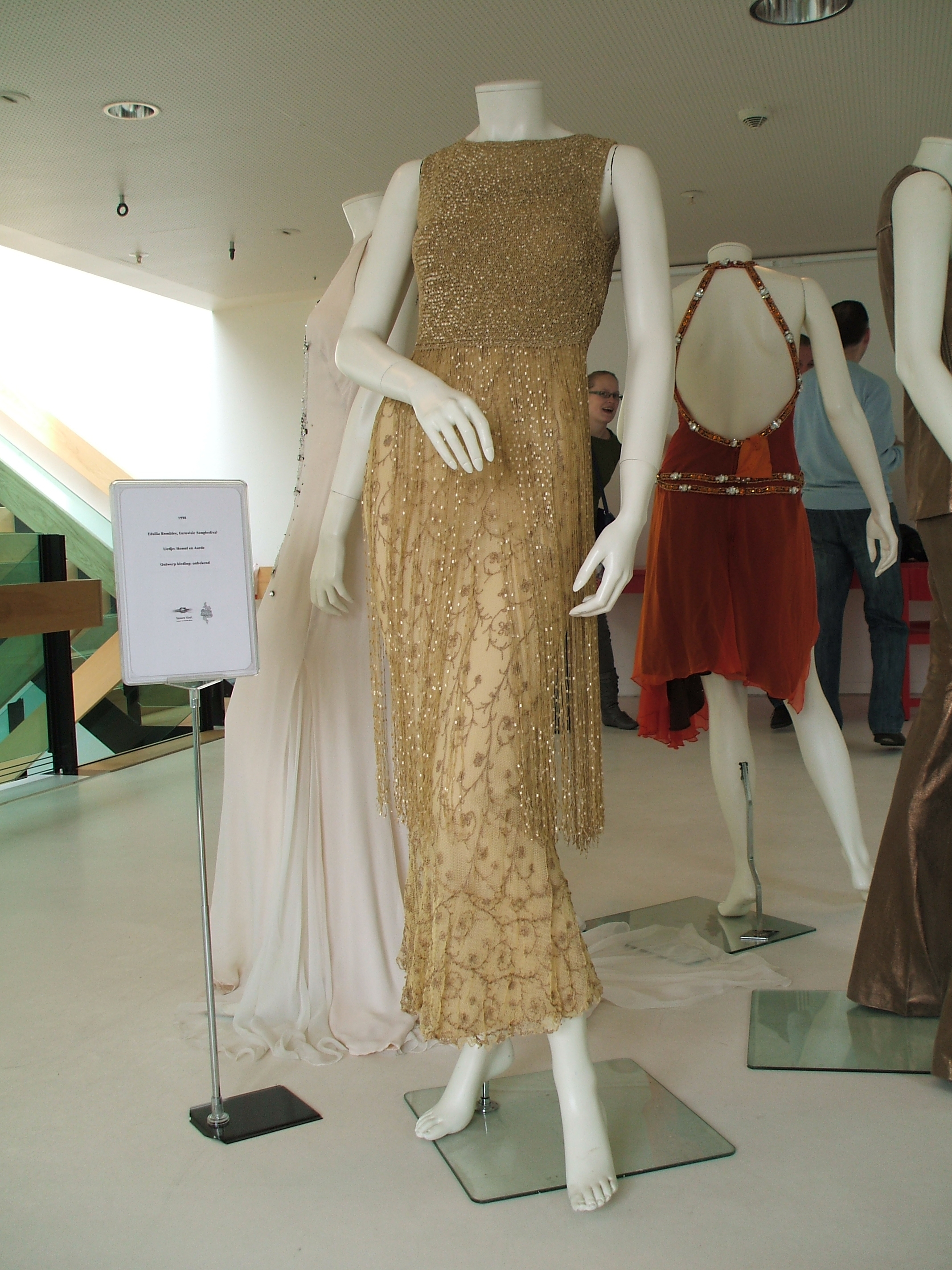
Rombley's 1998 dress on display in May 2010

In 1998, Edsilia competed in the Eurovision Song Contest 1998 in Birmingham, United Kingdom, where she gained 150 points and placed 4th with the song "Hemel en aarde" ("Heaven and earth"). This was the best result the Netherlands had achieved since their win in 1975 with Teach-In until The Common Linnets' second-place finish in 2014. The song was written by Fluitsma & Van Tijn and reached twelfth place in the top 40. Her debut English album was released shortly after her Eurovision participation.

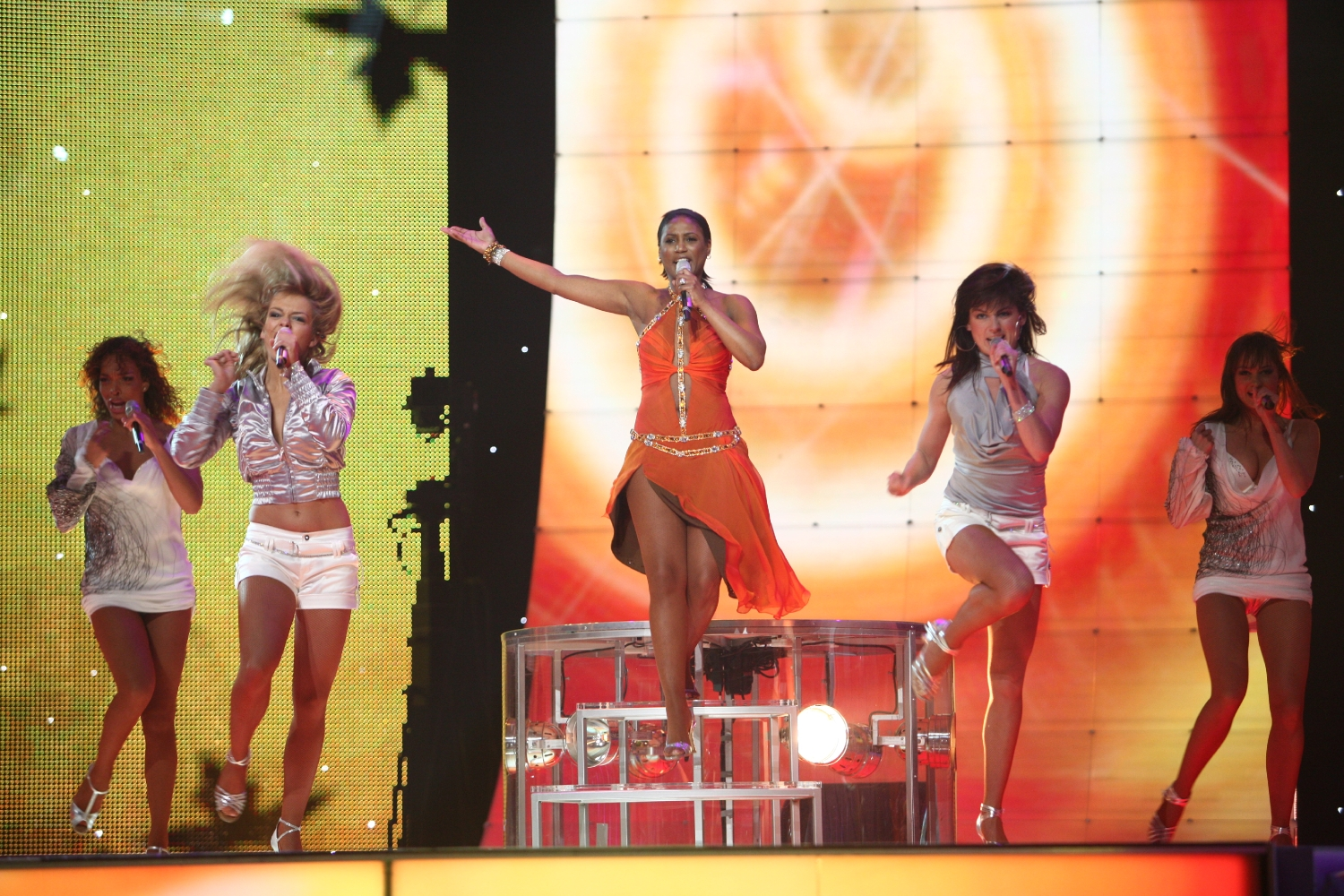
Rombley singing during the Eurovision Song Contest 2007 in Helsinki

Edsilia represented the Netherlands again at the Eurovision Song Contest 2007 in May 2007 in Helsinki, Finland with the song "On Top of the World", but was eliminated in the semi-finals. The Dutch original is titled "Nooit Meer Zonder Jou". She also announced the votes from the Netherlands for the Eurovision Final in 1999, in 2015, and in 2007 with Paul de Leeuw.

On 4 December 2019, she was announced one of the three presenters of the Eurovision Song Contest 2020 in Rotterdam, which was later cancelled due to the COVID-19 pandemic, alongside Chantal Janzen and Jan Smit. She later co-hosted Het Grote Songfestivalfeest (English: the Big Songfestival Party), a live concert show featuring artists from the past sixty-four years, at the Ziggo Dome in Amsterdam as a pre-event prior to the 2020 contest. The concert was broadcast on Dutch TV on New Year's Day 2020.

In 2021 she was one of the four presenters of the Eurovision Song Contest 2021, together with Chantal Janzen, Jan Smit and Nikkie de Jager.

=== Albums and tours, TV work ===
After many struggles, Edsilia released her second album "Face To Face" in 2002. The album was produced by Tjeerd Oosterhuis. This was preceded by the hit "What Have You Done To Me", which became nominated in the category for best R&B song at the TMF Awards. The same song gained her a nomination in 2003, as well as an Edison Award nomination for the 'Best Artist'. In spite of high expectations, the album did not do well. In 2003, "Face to Face" was released in Germany and also gained minimal success. The singer stayed there to promote the album, however, the album did not succeed.

From January 2004, the singer went on tour with jazz pianist Michiel Borstlap, in which she played a combination of headstock and jazz. Besides her own repertoire she covered song from Anita Baker and Oleta Adams. On 28 November Edsilia Rombley and Karin Bloemen sang during a benefit concert for Bangladesh, organised by Memisa, a foundation which works for the improvement of health care in developing countries. The singers were accompanied by a five-man band and backing singers. They also sang some special numbers by Tjeerd Oosterhuis, composed for Memisa.

Using one of the songs from the benefit concert in Bangladesh, her husband Tjeerd Oosterhuis created a version for a special cause. The song was for the benefit of the victims of the tsunami that occurred in the Indian Ocean. In January 2005, Edsilia was one of the singers incorporated into the Artists For Asia, "Als Je Iets Kan Doen" song that included many Dutch artists. In 2005, for the first time, Edsilia went on tour in the Dutch theaters with the show 'Van Jongs Af Aan'. She played a repertoire of covers, but also own numbers. In spite of her minimal success as a singer, the tour was rather successful.

In 2006, Rombley took part in the RTL 4 TV-programme Dancing with the Stars, a dancing contest with well-known Dutch and professional dancing teachers. Edsilia danced with the dance-coach Peter Bosveld, but was eliminated after the fourth show.

In June 2006, Edsilia's single "Dan Ben Ik Van Jou" was released as an indication of an entirely new album with Dutch compositions. It had reasonable success in the Dutch Top 40. On 1 September 2006 Edsilia married Tjeerd Oosterhuis in Amsterdam. Recently, her new single has appeared: "Eén Keer Meer Dan Jij". This ballad was written by Tjeerd Oosterhuis and will be on the new album titled "Meer Dan Ooit". The release is planned for February 2007. Edislia has begun a new tour in Dutch theatres. Edsilia's vocals are present on the single "Vlinders" by Brainpower, which was released in December 2006.

In 2019, Rombley has been assigned to the role of Mary at The Passion, which is a Dutch television show which tells the Easter story in a musical way.

She appears in the 2022 film Het Feest van Tante Rita, her first major film role.

== Discography ==
=== Studio albums ===
Title	Details	Peak chart positions
Title	Details	NL
Thuis	Released: 1997; Labels: TWF Music; Format: CD, Digital download	—
Edsilia	Released: 1998; Labels: Endemol Entertainment; Format: CD, Digital download	86
Face to face	Released: 29 July 2002; Labels: Dino Music; Format: CD, Digital download	—
Meer dan ooit	Released: 2007; Labels: Universal Music; Format: CD, Digital download	6
Uit mijn hart	Released: 2011; Labels: DEMP Music; Format: CD, Digital download	48
Sweet Soul Music	Released: 12 April 2013; Labels: DEMP Music; Format: CD, Digital download	7
The Piano Ballads, Vol. 1	Released: 28 November 2014; Labels: DEMP Music; Format: CD, Digital download	21
The Piano Ballads - Volume 2	Released: 14 December 2018; Labels: DEMP Music; Format: CD, Digital download	89
"—" denotes a recording that did not chart or was not released in that territory.

=== Live albums ===
Title	Details	Peak chart positions
Title	Details	NL
Live	Released: 2009; Labels: The Entertainment Group; Format: CD, Digital download	9

=== Singles ===
Title	Year	Peak chart positions	Album
Title	Year	NL	Album
"Baby It's You"	1997	—	Non-album singles
"Hemel en aarde"	1998	10	Non-album singles
"Second Floor"	1998	59	Non-album singles
"Get Here"	1999	88	Non-album singles
"How Can You Say That"	1999	—	Non-album singles
"What Have You Done to Me"	2001	98	Face to face
"Gotta Let Me Go"	2002	83	Face to face
"I'll Be That Someone"	2002	86	Face to face
"Dan ben ik van jou"	2006	45	Meer dan ooit
"Nooit meer zonder jou"	2007	14	Meer dan ooit
"On Top of the World"	2007	—	Meer dan ooit
"Een keer meer dan jij"	2007	—	Meer dan ooit
"Geef je over"	2010	84	Uit mijn hart
"Uit het oog niet uit mijn hart" (with Ruth Jacott)	2011	36	Uit mijn hart
"Ik Laat Je Niet Alleen"	2012	—	Non-album singles
"Zeg Me Dat Het Niet Zo Is"	2012	6	Non-album singles
"Van Jou"	2014	71	Non-album singles
"Als Jij ME Belooft"	2016	—	Non-album singles
"Wat Je Doet Met Mij" (featuring Re-Play)	2017	—	Non-album singles
"Weak"	2018	—	Non-album singles
"The Way You Make Me Feel"	2019	—	Non-album singles
"Breng Me Naar Het Water" (with Edwin Jonker)	2019	—	Non-album singles
"Lieve Mama"	2020	—	Non-album singles
"Goed Voor Mij" (with Kenny B)	2020	—	Non-album singles
"Raket Naar De Maan"	2020	—	Non-album singles
"In Balans"	2020	—	Non-album singles
"Chale (Ali B Op Volle Toeren)"	2020	—	Non-album singles
"Als Ik Weer Bij Jou Ben"	2021	—	Non-album singles
"Rustpunt"	2021	—	Non-album singles
"—" denotes a recording that did not chart or was not released in that territory.

== Filmography ==
- 2022: Het Feest van Tante Rita

Awards and achievements
Preceded by Mrs. Einstein with "Niemand heeft nog tijd"	Netherlands in the Eurovision Song Contest; 1998	Succeeded by Marlayne with "One Good Reason"
Preceded by Treble with "Amambanda"	Netherlands in the Eurovision Song Contest; 2007	Succeeded by Hind with "Your Heart Belongs to Me"
Preceded by (Israel) Erez Tal, Bar Refaeli, Assi Azar and Lucy Ayoub (2019)	Eurovision Song Contest presenter 2021; With: Chantal Janzen, Jan Smit and Nikkie de Jager	Succeeded by (Italy) Alessandro Cattelan, Laura Pausini and (United Kingdom) Mika
