= Maxine (singer) =

- Born: Gonny Buurmeester; 14 October 1970 (age 55); Rotterdam, Netherlands
- Genres: Eurohouse, pop
- Occupation: Singer

Gonny Buurmeester (born 14 October 1970), known professionally as Maxine, is a Dutch singer. She is known for representing the Netherlands in the Eurovision Song Contest 1996, together with Franklin Brown.

== Career ==
Born in 1970, Maxine grew up in Rotterdam and later moved to Breda. At the age of fifteen, she started taking singing lessons in Antwerp, Belgium. Her first single was a cover of the song "A Love So Beautiful" by Roy Orbison.

In 1996, she entered the Nationaal Songfestival – the Dutch national selection for the Eurovision Song Contest – together with Franklin Brown. Their entry "De eerste keer" went on to win the competition, giving them the right to represent the Netherlands in the Eurovision Song Contest 1996 held in Oslo, Norway. They finished in seventh place with 78 points.

After the contest, Maxine pursued a solo career. In 2000, she was a contestant in Big Brother VIPs.

== Discography ==
=== Singles ===
- "De eerste keer" (1996) – with Franklin Brown
- "Als je weet wat je wilt" (1996)
- "Nooit meer alleen" (1997)
- "Waanzin" (1997)
- "African Dream" (1999)
- "Free (Let It Be)" (2003) – with Stuart
- "Fuel to Fire" (2003) – with Stuart
- "Steeds weer" (2007) – with Franklin Brown
- "Balsem voor het hart" (2012) – with Franklin Brown

Awards and achievements
Preceded by Willeke Alberti with "Waar is de zon?"	Netherlands in the Eurovision Song Contest; 1996	Succeeded by Mrs. Einstein with "Niemand heeft nog tijd"
