= Michelle Courtens =

Michelle
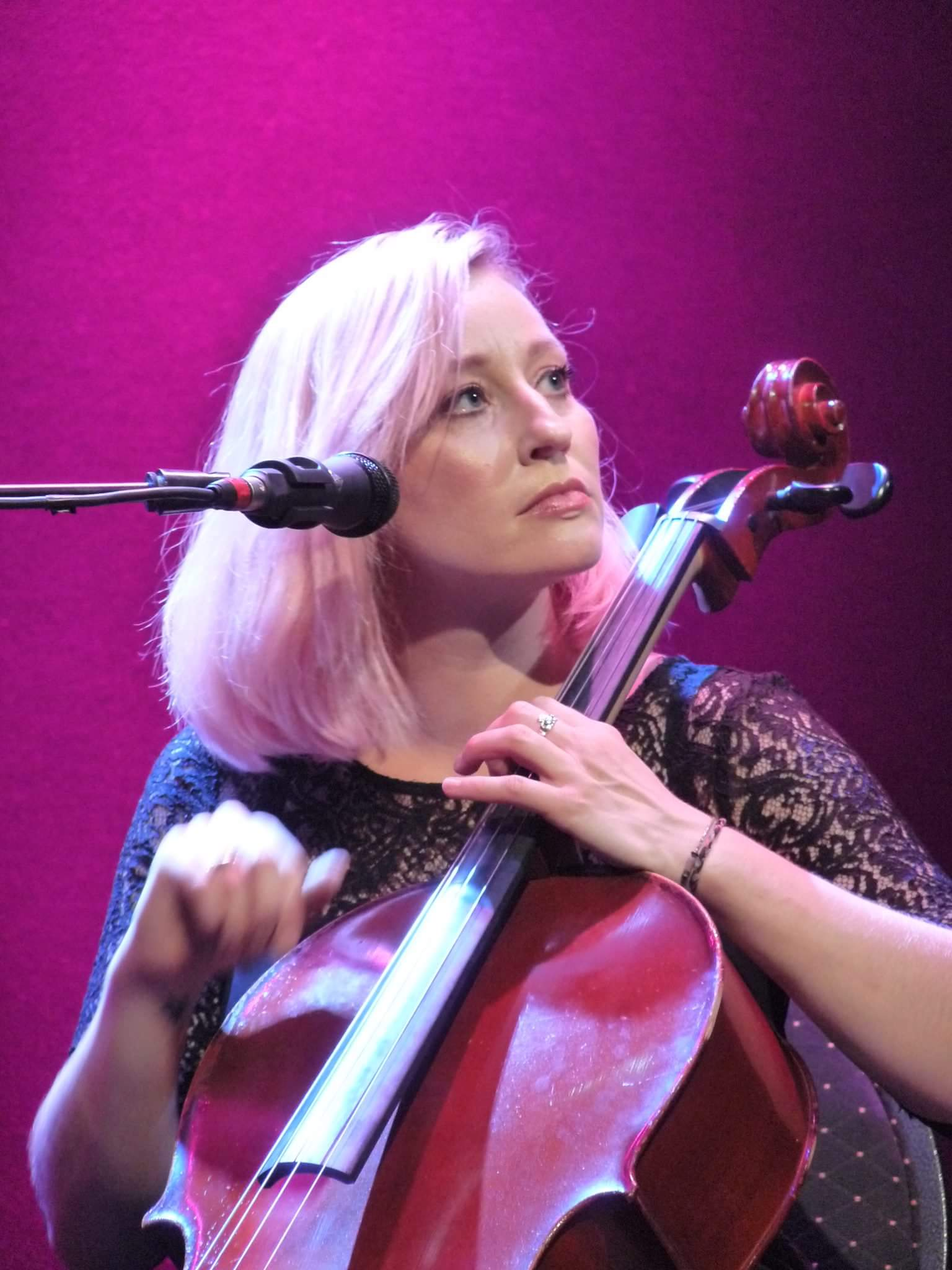

Background information
- Born: Michelle Courtens; 3 August 1981 (age 44); Venray, Netherlands
- Occupations: Singer, cellist
- Instruments: Vocals, cello
- Years active: 1998–present

Michelle Courtens (born 3 August 1981), known professionally as Michelle, is a Dutch singer and cellist. She is best known for representing the Netherlands at the Eurovision Song Contest 2001.

== Biography ==
Courtens developed an interest in music at an early age, beginning violin lessons at the age of four and taking up the cello at seven.

In 1998, she began studying light music vocals at the Conservatorium van Amsterdam. She graduated with distinction in 2003 in jazz vocals and cello and subsequently continued her studies at master’s level.

On 2 March 2001, Courtens competed in the final of the Nationaal Songfestival, the Dutch national selection for the Eurovision Song Contest, having qualified through the preliminary round. She performed the alternative pop song Out on My Own, which reflects themes of independence and personal freedom following her move to her first apartment in Amsterdam. She won the competition with a total of 84 points, receiving the highest scores from both the public vote (50 points) and the professional jury (34 points).

At the Eurovision Song Contest 2001, Michelle performed barefoot while seated. The entry received 16 points and finished in 18th place out of 23 participating countries. As a result, under the contest rules in force at the time, the Netherlands was relegated and did not participate in the Eurovision Song Contest 2002. In March 2001, Out on My Own reached number nine on the Dutch Top 40 and number ten on the Single Top 100, making it the highest-charting Dutch Eurovision entry to that date.

In 2002, Courtens released the single Coming Up Roses, which received limited public attention.

She later wrote the song served as the theme song for the 2009 Femme van het Jaar election organised by the FemFusion foundation, an initiative recognising influential Dutch lesbians.

In 2014, Courtens appeared in the Dutch-language musical productions Chess and Waanzinnig gedroomd.

As a cellist, she has performed alongside artists including Jim Bakkum, Ellen ten Damme, and Marlayne. She is also a member of the band EinsteinBarbie, in which she performs as both singer and cellist.

During 2018 and 2019, Courtens performed with the band of Sjors van der Panne, contributing cello, accordion, and bass guitar.

== Personal life ==
On 16 September 2006, Courtens married her partner Carlijn.
