= Willeke Alberti =

Dutch singer and actress (born 1945)

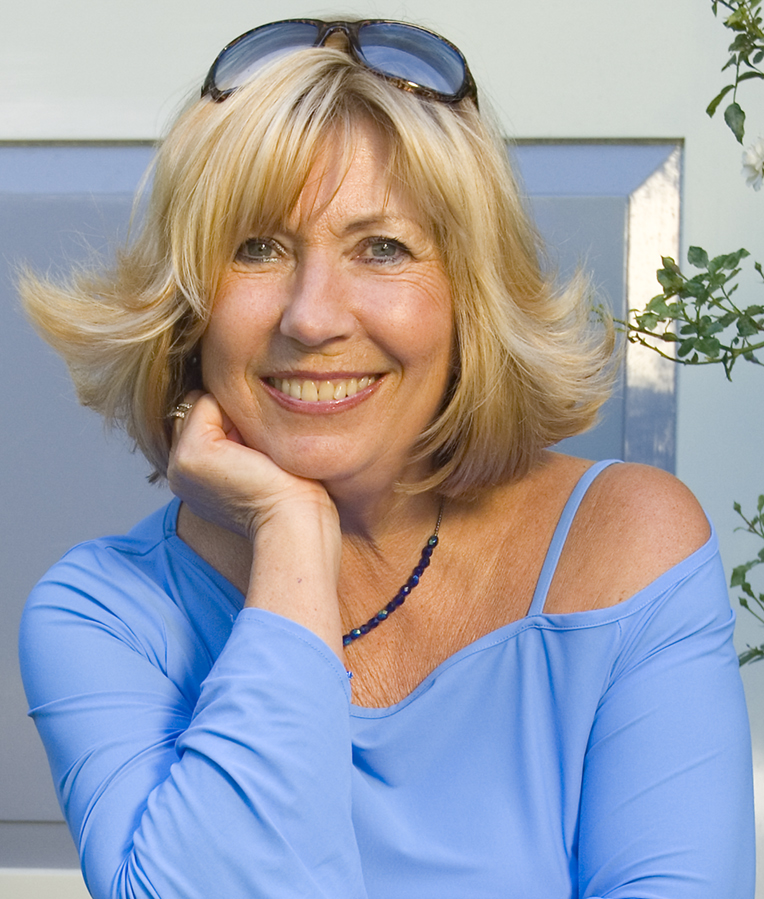
- Alberti in 2006
- Born: Willy Albertina Verbrugge; 3 February 1945 (age 81); Amsterdam, Netherlands
- Occupations: Singer, actress
- Years active: 1956–present
- Spouses: Joop Oonk (m. 1965; div. 1974) John de Mol Jr. (m. 1976; div. 1980) Søren Lerby (m. 1981; div. 1996)
- Children: 3, including Johnny de Mol
- Father: Willy Alberti
- Musical career
- Genres: Schlager, levenslied
- Years active: 1958–present
- Labels: Philips; Universal Music Group; EMI
- Website: www.willekealberti.nl

Willy Albertina Verbrugge (born 3 February 1945), known professionally as Willeke Alberti, is a Dutch singer and actress, the daughter of entertainer and singer Willy Alberti (1926–1985) and Hendrika Geertruida Kuiper (1921–2011).

== Biography ==
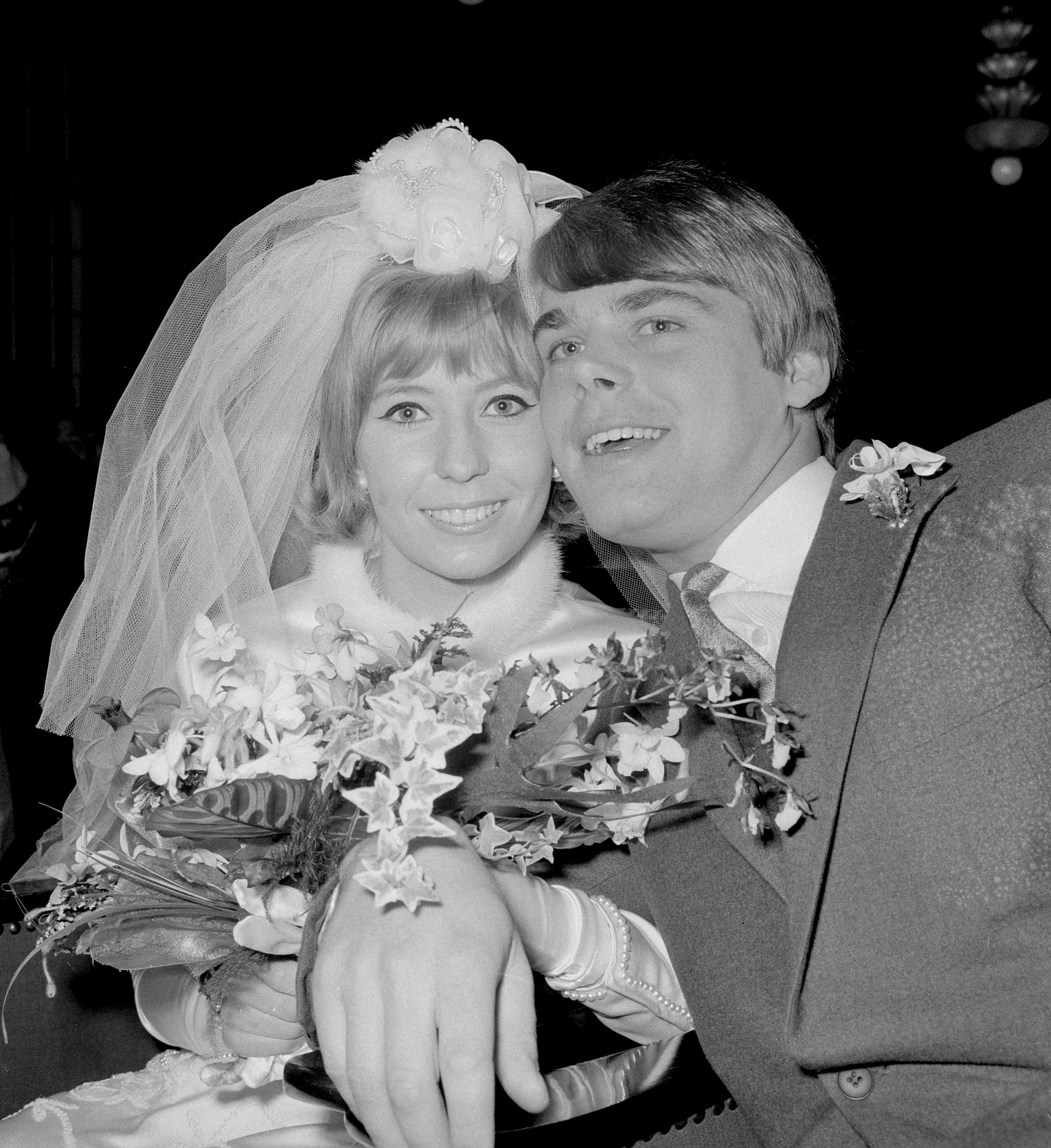
Willeke Alberti and Joop Oonk getting married on 27 December 1965

Alberti started her career at the early age of eleven in the musical Duel om Barbara and she recorded her first single in 1958 together with her father. During the 1960s, she was a well-known singer in the Netherlands and had at least one No. 1 hit with De winter was lang (The winter was long, a cover of Blue Winter, sung by Connie Francis), however there was no official Dutch chart at the time. Her single Spiegelbeeld (Mirror image), which was a cover of the French version of Tender Years, reached the status of gold record in 1963. Willeke and her father had a television show between 1965 and 1969. Her singing career from 1970 onwards is less active, however Alberti still releases singles and albums at an irregular interval and plays minor roles in television programs and movies.

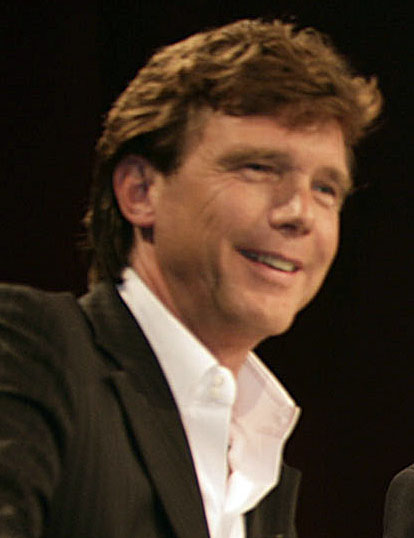
Alberti was married to John de Mol Jr. from 1976 to 1980

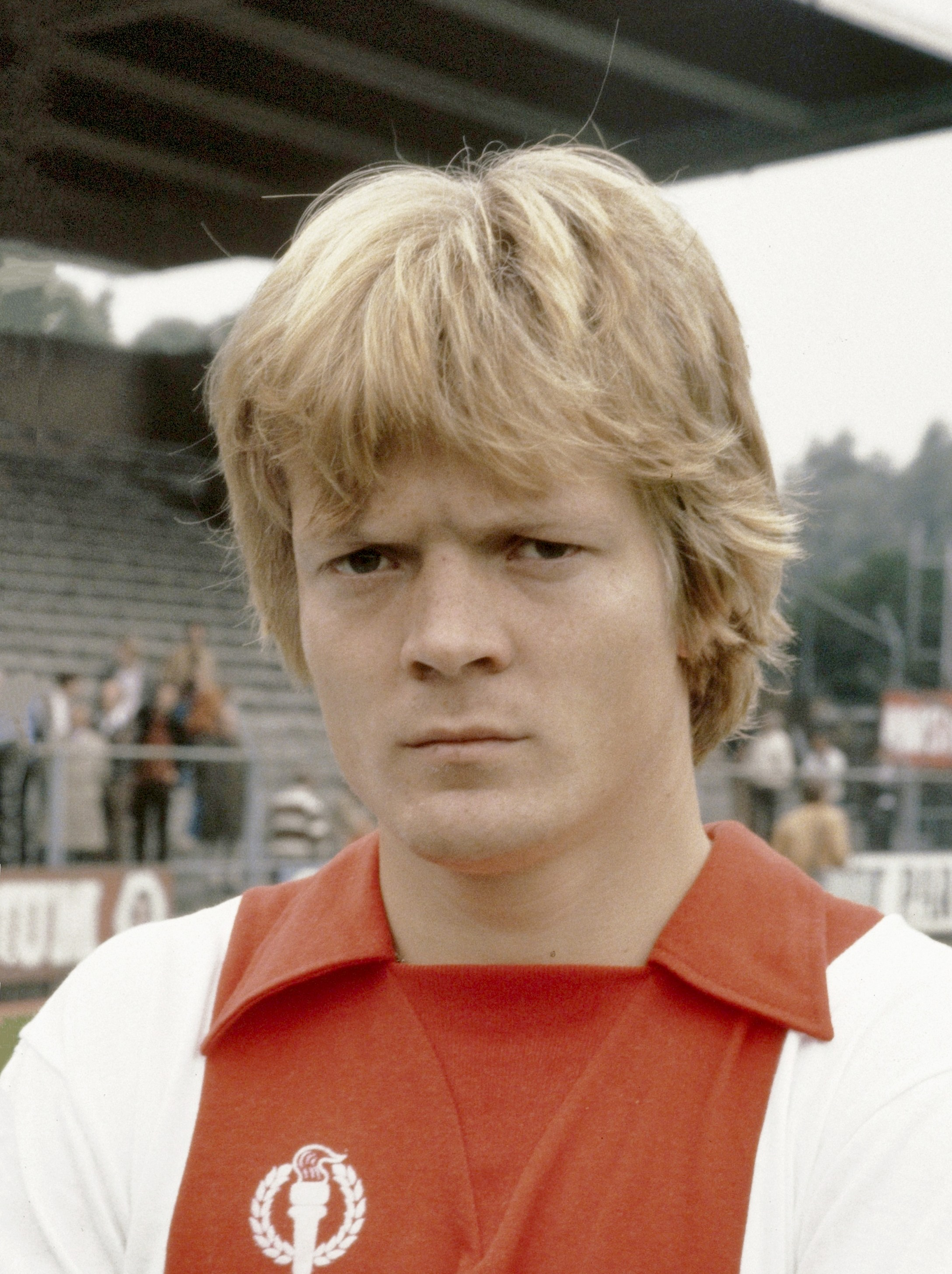
Alberti was married to Søren Lerby from 1981 to 1996

From 1965 to 1974 she was married to musician Joop Oonk and they had a daughter. She married John de Mol in 1976, and they had a son, Johnny de Mol. The couple divorced in 1980, and Alberti married a third time, with football player Søren Lerby. Another son was born from that marriage. Søren Lerby and Alberti separated in 1996.

In 1994, she represented the Netherlands in the Eurovision Song Contest with the song "Waar is de zon?" ("Where is the sun?"), which claimed a meagre four points from the international juries, all coming from Austria, placing 23rd.

Through the years Alberti has become embraced in the Netherlands as a gay icon, due to a combination of her song repertoire, her durability and her performances in support of many gay causes. She is the mother-in-law of John van 't Schip.

== Filmography ==
- De Kleine Waarheid (TV Series) 1970
- Oom Ferdinand en de Toverdrank (1974)
- Slippers (TV Movie) (1975)
- Rooie Sien (1975)
- Kiss Me Kate (TV Movie) (1975)
- Pygmalion (TV Movie) (1976)
- Lachcarrousel (TV Movie) (1976)
- Dag 80 hallo 81 (1980)
- Filmpje! (1995)
- Nachtrit (2006)
- Alles is familie (2012)
- Sinterklaas en de Pepernoten Chaos (2013)

Awards and achievements
Preceded by Ruth Jacott with "Vrede"	Netherlands in the Eurovision Song Contest; 1994	Succeeded by Maxine & Franklin Brown with "De eerste keer" No representation in 1995
