= Linda Wagenmakers =

Dutch singer

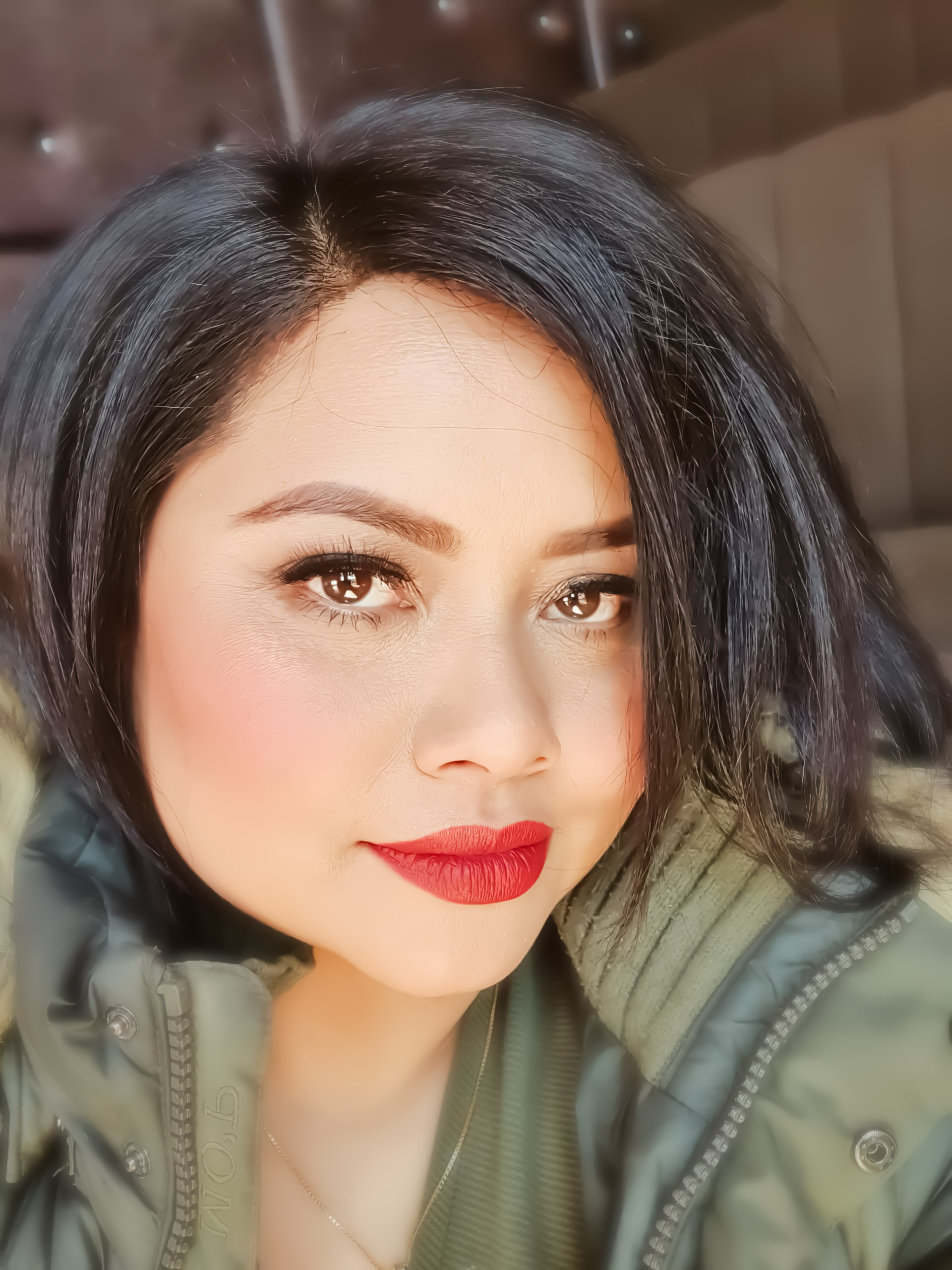
- Linda Wagenmakers in 2021
- Born: 30 November 1975 (age 50); Arnhem, The Netherlands
- Occupation: Singer/actress

Linda Wagenmakers (born 30 November 1975, Arnhem) is a Dutch singer and actress of Indonesian blood.

Wagenmakers started her career at 21 years old while playing Kim in the Amsterdam edition of the musical Miss Saigon. She played in the RTL4 drama series Westenwind, for which she also recorded the song "Laat me vrij om te gaan". Wagenmakers voiced the Dutch version of Mulan in the 1999 Disney animated film. Also in part of many television series and events. She was in part of the original casting of Rocky over the rainbow playing Maggs and in later versions as Dorothy. She was also in part of Musicals in Ahoy in 2001 along singing the role of Kim from Miss Saigon as well as Eponine from Les Miserables. She also represented her country in the Eurovision Song Contest 2000 in Stockholm, with the song "No Goodbyes" involving a huge, bicoloured (black and white) dress designed by Jan Aarntzen. She featured in a gospel national theater tour in The Spirit of Joy!. She also played the lead role in the Dolly Dots' musical Love Me Just A Little Bit More as Lisa, an awkward high school girl with a great voice caught in the teen drama. She released a gospel album titled Full Circle. She played as Sis in the musical Shhh...It Happens. She played Alex in The Witches of Eastwick working along with April Darby and Joke de Kruijf. She played as the witch Caramella at the national tour of Hansel and Gretel for Van Hoorne productions and as the Lady of the Lake in the Monty Python musical Spamalot. She returned to the stage as Anastasia in the faux comedy Fifty Shades: The Parody for Senf productions. She also was the voice of Tiana, the first Black American Disney Princess for the 2009 animated film The Princess and the Frog. Along with her work on stage she started to devote time on coaching other artists vocally and mentally for Vocal Center, and finished the competition in thirteenth place after the voting.

== Dubbing ==
- Mulan - Mulan
- Iggy Arbuckle - Kira
- The Princess and the Frog - Tiana
- Winx Club: The Mystery of the Abyss - Icy and singer for "Sirenix"
- Tashi - Lotus
- Ralph Breaks the Internet - Mulan and Tiana
- Jumpers - Character

== Discography ==
=== Albums ===
- Miss Saigon-Original Dutch cast recording (1997)
- Love Me Just A Little Bit More: The Musical-Cast recording
- Full Circle-Gospel album
- Spamalot

=== Singles ===
Title	Year	Peak chart positions	Album
"No Goodbyes"	2000	-	

Awards and achievements
Preceded by Marlayne with "One Good Reason"	Netherlands in the Eurovision Song Contest; 2000	Succeeded by Michelle with "Out on My Own"
