= Esther Hart (singer) =

Dutch singer (born 1970)

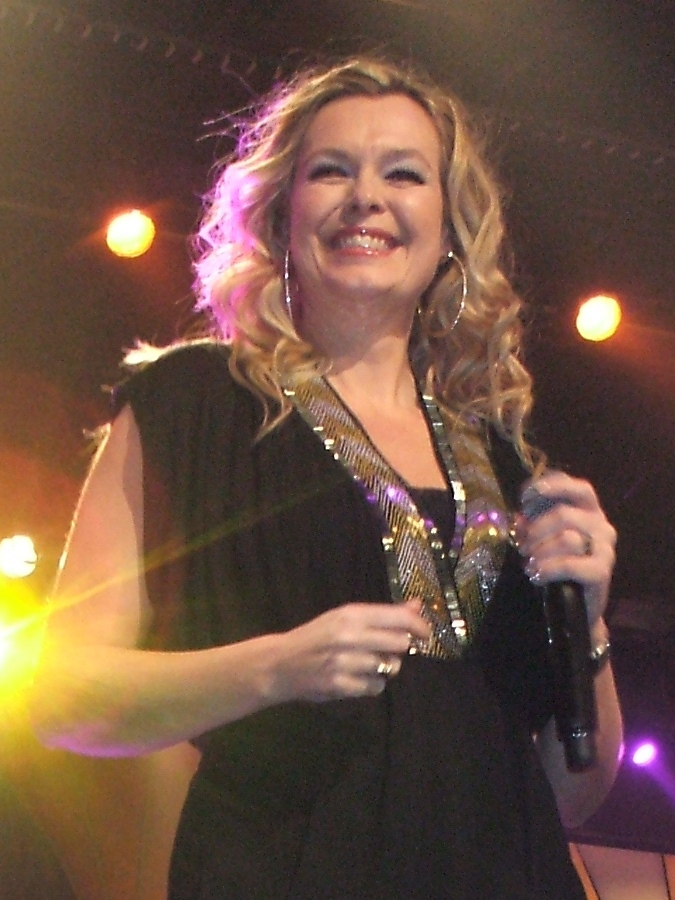
- Esther Hart in 2011

Background information
- Born: Esther Katinka Hartkamp; 3 June 1970 (age 56); Epe, Netherlands
- Genres: Pop music
- Occupation: Singer

Esther Katinka Hartkamp (born 3 June 1970), known professionally as Esther Hart, is a Dutch singer.

== Career ==
Hart entered BBC TV's A Song for Europe contest in 2003 with the song "Wait for the Moment". She withdrew from that contest as participating for two countries would not have been acceptable for both BBC, and NOS. She opted for participating in Nationaal Songfestival, the Dutch heat of the Eurovision Song Contest, and won. Her song, "One More Night", was placed 13th in the Eurovision Song Contest 2003. She read the Dutch results at the 2004 and 2008 contests.

== Activism ==
On 17 January 2008, Hart willingly went to jail and stayed overnight in an attempt to gain publicity and money for charity. During that time, she gave a concert with the Dutch broadcaster NCRV (Dutch Christian Radio Association) and the Exodus Foundation, which provides assistance for former prisoners to adapt to normal life. In addition, a poetry contest was held by the prisoners with the theme of "dare to believe in change", with the winning poem to be read by Hart.

Awards and achievements
Preceded by Michelle with "Out on My Own"; No representation in 2002	Netherlands in the Eurovision Song Contest; 2003	Succeeded by Re-union with "Without You"
