= Netherlands in the Eurovision Song Contest 1997 =

- Eurovision Song Contest 1997
- Participating broadcaster: Nederlandse Omroep Stichting (NOS)
- Country: Netherlands
- Selection process: Artist: Internal selection Song: Nationaal Songfestival 1997
- Selection date: Artist: 26 October 1996; Song: 23 February 1997

Competing entry
- Song: "Niemand heeft nog tijd"
- Artist: Mrs. Einstein
- Songwriter: Ed Hooijmans

Placement
- Final result: 22nd, 5 points

Participation chronology

The Netherlands was represented at the Eurovision Song Contest 1997 with the song "Niemand heeft nog tijd", written by Ed Hooijmans, and performed by the group Mrs. Einstein. The Dutch participating broadcaster, Nederlandse Omroep Stichting (NOS), selected its entry for the contest through Nationaal Songfestival 1997, after having previously selected the performers internally. NOS announced Mrs. Einstein's as its representative on 26 October 1996. Six songs competed in the national final on 23 February 1997 to select the song, where "Niemand heeft nog tijd" was selected following the combination of votes from twelve regional juries and a public vote.

The Netherlands competed in the Eurovision Song Contest which took place on 3 May 1997. Performing during the show in position 8, the Netherlands placed twenty-second out of the 25 participating countries, scoring 5 points.

== Background ==
Prior to the 1997 contest, Nederlandse Televisie Stichting (NTS) until 1969, and Nederlandse Omroep Stichting (NOS) since 1970, had participated in the Eurovision Song Contest representing the Netherlands thirty-eight times since NTS début in the inaugural contest in 1956. They have won the contest four times: in 1957 with the song "Net als toen" performed by Corry Brokken; in 1959 with the song "'n Beetje" performed by Teddy Scholten; in 1969 as one of four countries to tie for first place with "De troubadour" performed by Lenny Kuhr; and finally in 1975 with "Ding-a-dong" performed by the group Teach-In. The Dutch least successful result has been last place, which they have achieved on four occasions, most recently in the 1968 contest. They has also received nul points on two occasions; in 1962 and 1963.

As part of its duties as participating broadcaster, NOS organises the selection of its entry in the Eurovision Song Contest and broadcasts the event in the country. The Dutch broadcasters had used various methods to select the Dutch entry in the past, such as the Nationaal Songfestival, a live televised national final to choose the performer, song or both to compete at Eurovision. However, internal selections have also been held on occasion. In 1996, NOS has organised Nationaal Songfestival in order to select both the artist and song for the contest. For 1997, the broadcaster opted to select the artist through an internal selection, while Nationaal Songfestival was continued to select the song.

== Before Eurovision ==
=== Artist selection ===
Following Maxine and Franklin Brown's seventh place in 1996 with the song "De eerste keer", NOS internally selected its artist for the Eurovision Song Contest 1997. On 26 October 1996, the broadcaster announced that it had selected the group Mrs. Einstein to represent the Netherlands at the 1997 contest. Among the group members was Suzanne Venneker who had previously competed in the 1983 and 1984 national finals as a member of the group Vulcano. It was revealed on the same day that their Eurovision song would be selected through the national final Nationaal Songfestival 1997.

=== Nationaal Songfestival 1997 ===
NOS opened a submission period following the artist announcement where composers were able to submit their songs until 6 December 1996. 350 songs were received by the broadcaster at the closing of the deadline and the six selected competing songs were announced on 14 February 1997. The selection of the songs for the competition occurred through the decision of a selection commission that included Mrs. Einstein and NPS director Willem van Beusekom.

The national final took place on 23 February 1997 at the Marcanti Plaza in Amsterdam, hosted by Bart Peeters and Joop van Zijl and was broadcast on TV2. All six competing songs were performed by Mrs. Einstein and the winning song, "Niemand heeft nog tijd", was selected by the 50/50 combination of a public televote and the votes of twelve regional juries. The viewers and the juries each had a total of 336 points to award. Each jury group distributed their points as follows: 1, 2, 3, 5, 7 and 10 points. The viewer vote was based on the percentage of votes each song achieved. For example, if a song gained 10% of the vote, then that entry would be awarded 10% of 336 points rounded to the nearest integer: 37 points. In addition to the performances of the competing songs, Herman van Molle, Jacques d'Ancona, Lisa Riley, Petra Hoost, and past Dutch Eurovision entrants Corry Brokken (1956, 1957, and 1958), Heddy Lester (1977), Gerard Joling (1988), and Maxine and Franklin Brown (1996) were also present during the show.

Final – 23 February 1997
R/O	Song	Songwriter(s)	Jury	Televote	Total	Place
1	"Ik doe alsof"	Erwin de Graaf	29	24	53	6
2	"Dat liefde zo moet zijn"	Hans van Hemert, Claudia Robbens	76	77	153	3
3	"Samen sterk"	Alan Michael, Tjeerd van Zanen	30	27	57	5
4	"Niemand heeft nog tijd"	Ed Hooijmans	77	82	159	1
5	"Toen de aarde stilstond"	Guus Willemse	75	82	157	2
6	"Laat het los"	Jerry van der Wolf	49	44	93	4

Detailed Regional Jury Votes
R/O	Song	Friesland	Groningen	Drenthe	Overijssel	Gelderland	Utrecht	Flevoland	North Holland	South Holland	Zeeland	North Brabant	Limburg	Total
1	"Ik doe alsof"	1	3	2	1	1	1	2	3	5	2	7	1	53
2	"Dat liefde zo moet zijn"	10	1	5	5	10	2	7	10	3	3	10	10	153
3	"Samen sterk"	2	5	1	2	2	3	3	5	1	1	2	3	57
4	"Niemand heeft nog tijd"	7	7	10	7	7	10	5	1	10	7	1	5	159
5	"Toen de aarde stilstond"	3	10	7	10	3	5	10	7	7	5	5	7	157
6	"Laat het los"	5	2	3	3	5	7	1	2	2	10	3	2	93

== At Eurovision ==
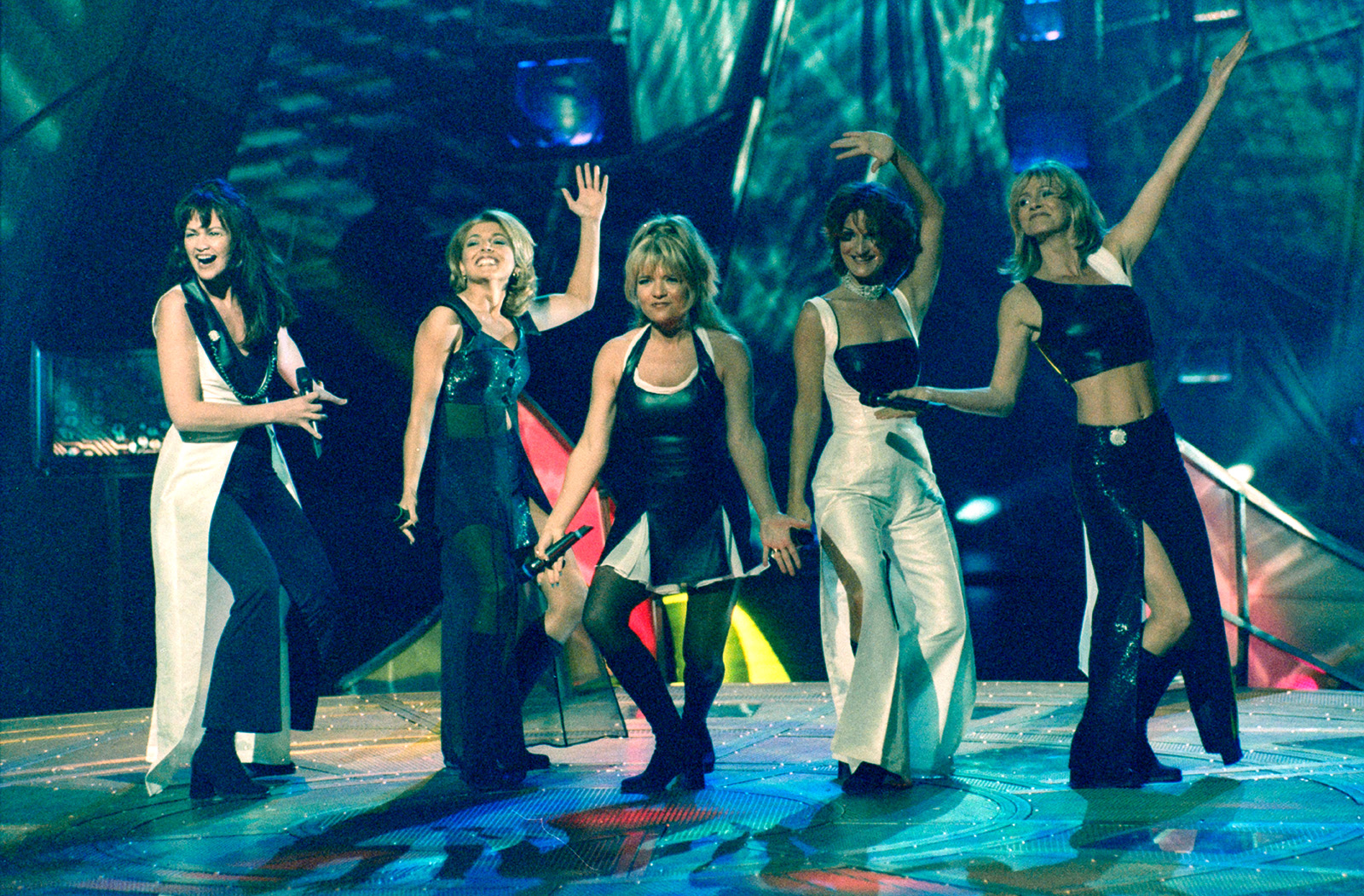
Mrs. Einstein performing at the Eurovision Song Contest

According to Eurovision rules, the twenty-four countries which had obtained the highest average number of points over the last four contests competed in the final on 3 May 1997. On 28 November 1996, a special allocation draw was held which determined the running order and the Netherlands was set to perform in position 8, following the entry from Switzerland and before the entry from Italy. The Dutch conductor at the contest was Dick Bakker, and the Netherlands finished in twenty-second place with 5 points.

The show was broadcast in the Netherlands on TV2 with commentary by Willem van Beusekom as well as via radio on Radio 2. The show was watched by an average of 2.7 million viewers with the voting segment seen by 3.2 million viewers. NOS appointed Corry Brokken as its spokesperson to announce the Dutch votes during the show.

=== Voting ===
Below is a breakdown of points awarded to the Netherlands and awarded by the Netherlands in the contest. The nation awarded its 12 points to the United Kingdom in the contest.

Points awarded to the Netherlands
Score	Country
12 points	
10 points	
8 points	
7 points	
6 points	
5 points	
4 points	Malta
3 points	
2 points	
1 point	Turkey

Points awarded by the Netherlands
Score	Country
12 points	United Kingdom
10 points	Cyprus
8 points	Russia
7 points	Italy
6 points	Spain
5 points	France
4 points	Ireland
3 points	Austria
2 points	Turkey
1 point	Poland
