= Mrs. Einstein =

Dutch musical group

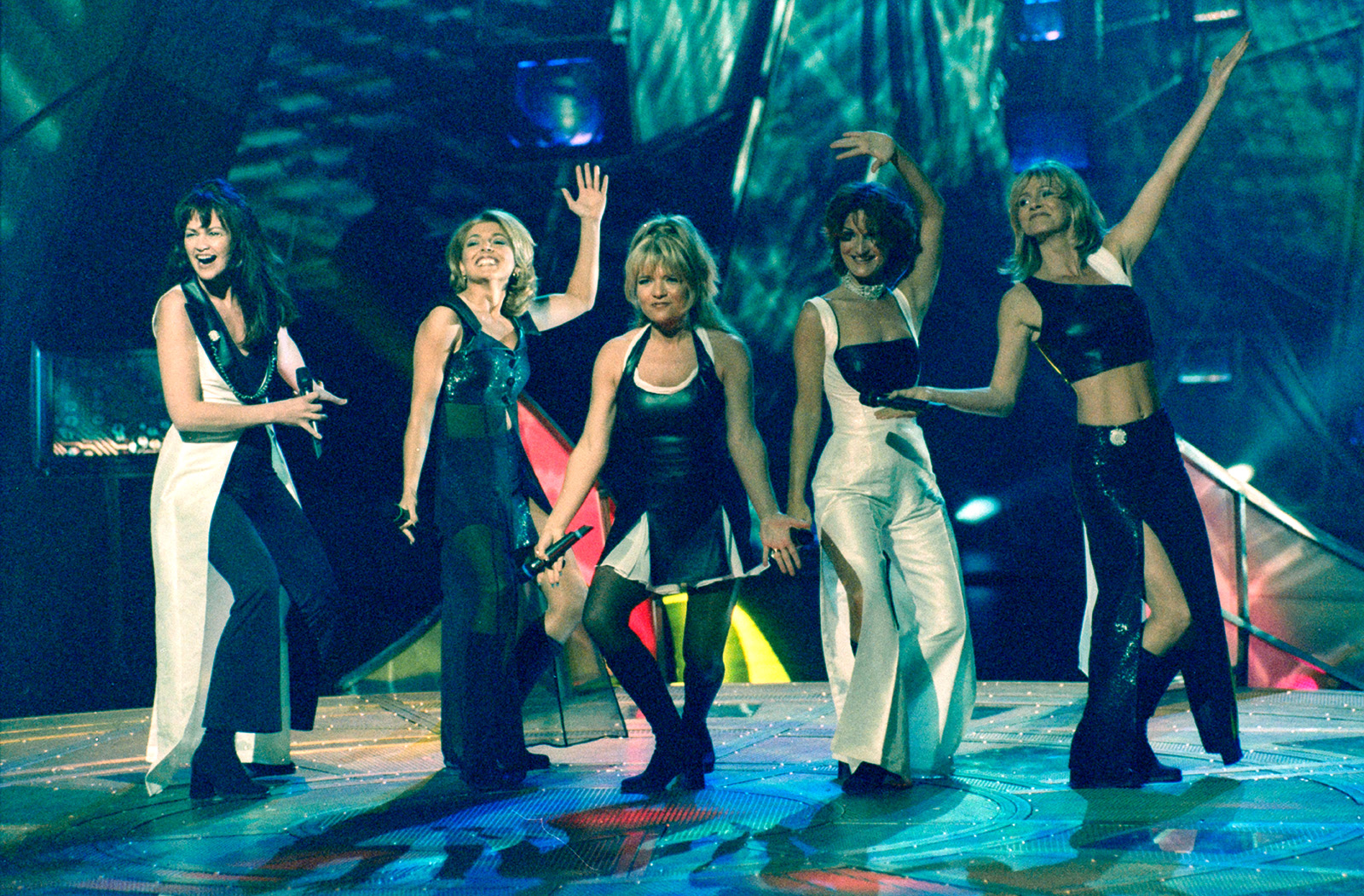
- Mrs. Einstein at the Eurovision Song Contest 1997

Background information
- Origin: Netherlands
- Years active: 1990–present
- Labels: Columbia Records
- Members: Saskia van Zutphen; Paulette Willemse; Marjolein Spijkers; Linda Caminita
- Past members: Suzanne Venneker; Ellen van Harmelen; Ellen Pieters; Melline Mollerus; Linda Snoeij; Joke van der Hoek

Mrs. Einstein is a Dutch all-female vocal group. The group is most notable for representing the Netherlands in the Eurovision Song Contest 1997 held in Dublin, Ireland with the song "Niemand heeft nog tijd".

== History ==
Mrs. Einstein was founded in 1990 by De Meisjes (1987–90) members Saskia van Zutphen, Paulette Willemse and Suzanne Venneker. The group usually performs in theatres, covering songs from all over the world in a different genre or with translated lyrics.

In 1997, Mrs. Einstein was internally selected to represent the Netherlands in the Eurovision Song Contest. Their entry, "Niemand heeft nog tijd", was chosen through the national final Nationaal Songfestival 1997. In Dublin, the group received a total of 5 points, finishing in 22nd place out of 25 participants.

== Members ==
Saskia van Zutphen
Paulette Willemse
Suzanne Venneker
Ellen van Harmelen
Ellen Pieters
Melline Mollerus
Marjolein Spijkers
Marjolein Spijkers
Linda Snoeij
Joke van der Hoek
Linda Caminita
│
1990
│
1991
│
1992
│
1993
│
1994
│
1995
│
1996
│
1997
│
1998
│
1999
│
2000
│
2001
│
2002
│
2003
│
2004
│
2005
│
2006
│
2007
│
2008
│
2009
│
2010
│
2011
│
2012
│
2013
│
2014
│
2015
│
2016
│
2017
│
2018
│
2019
│
2020
Band members

== Discography ==
=== Albums ===
Title	Details	Peak chart positions
Title	Details	NL
Mrs. Einstein Goes Europe	Released: 28 May 1997; Label: Columbia Records; Format: CD	78

=== Singles ===
Title	Year	Peak chart positions	Album
Title	Year	NL	Album
"Niemand heeft nog tijd"	1997	65	Mrs. Einstein Goes Europe
"—" denotes a recording that did not chart or was not released in that territory.

Awards and achievements
Preceded by Maxine & Franklin Brown with "De eerste keer"	Netherlands in the Eurovision Song Contest; 1997	Succeeded by Edsilia Rombley with "Hemel en aarde"
