= Marlayne =

Dutch singer (b. 1971)

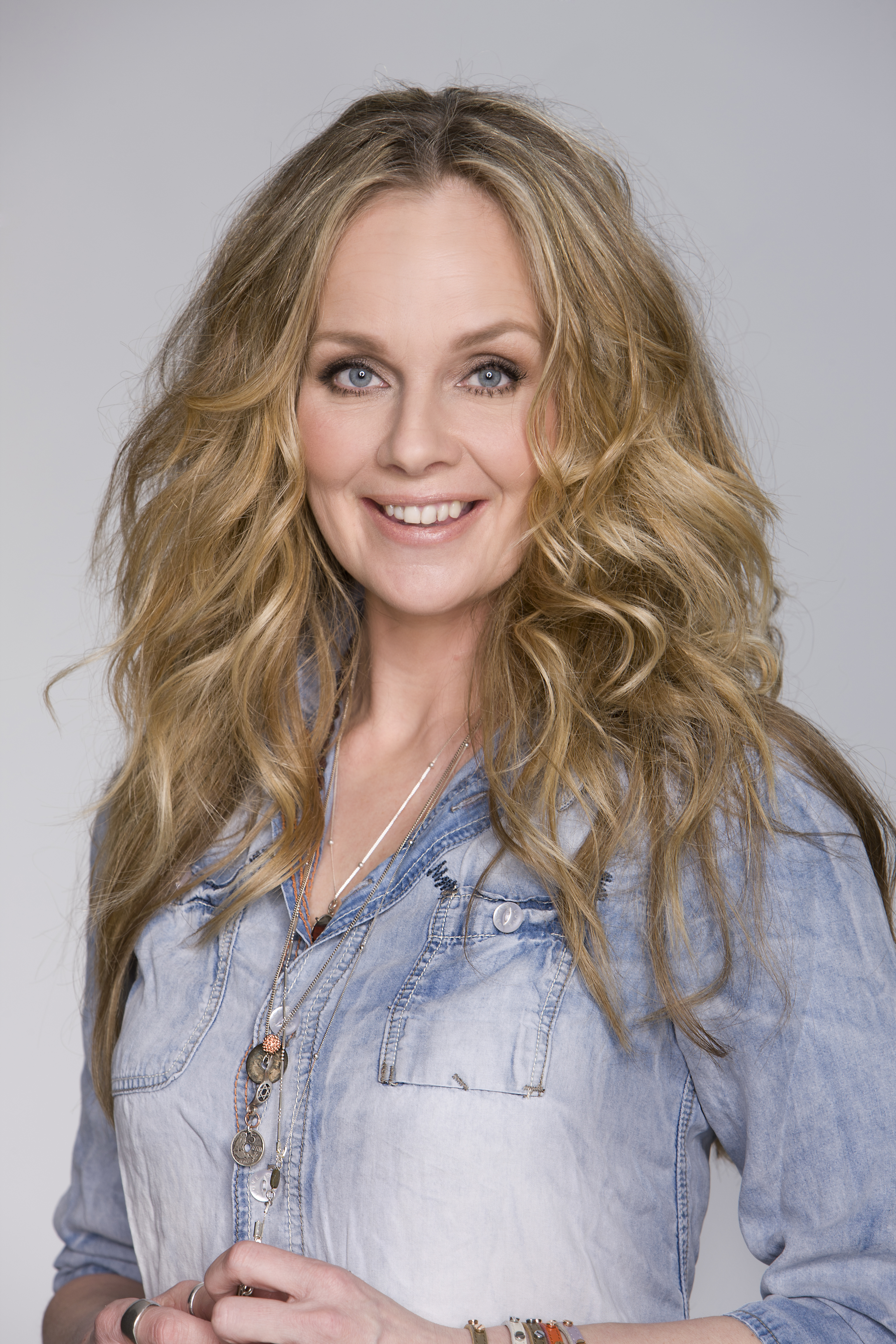
- Marlayne in 2011

Background information
- Also known as: Marlayne Sahupala
- Born: Marleen van den Broek; 1 July 1971 (age 55)
- Origin: Baarn, Netherlands
- Genres: Pop
- Occupation: Singer
- Website: www.marlayne.nl

Marleen Sahupala (née van den Broek; born 1 July 1971), known professionally as Marlayne or Marlayne Sahupala, is a Dutch singer, television presenter and newsreader. She is known for representing the Netherlands in the Eurovision Song Contest 1999 with the song "One Good Reason".

== Career ==
=== Eurovision Song Contest ===
Marlayne had mainly worked as a backing vocalist for singers such as René Froger when in 1999, her song "One Good Reason" was chosen from ten candidates to represent the Netherlands in the 44th Eurovision Song Contest held in Jerusalem. "One Good Reason" was the first Dutch entry to be sung in English since 1976, following the abolition of the national language rule for the 1999 contest. It received a total of 71 points, placing eighth out of 23 entries.

Marlayne remained connected to the contest after her participation: she was the spokesperson for the Netherlands in 2000, 2001 and 2003, and a member of the Dutch national jury in 2014.

=== Later career ===
Marlayne released her first and (to date) only album, Meant to Be, in 2001. In 2003, she became a presenter of the news and current affairs programme Hart van Nederland on the national television channel SBS6. She subsequently presented several entertainment shows, notably De Nieuwe Uri Geller, the Dutch version of The Successor.

== Personal life ==
Marlayne has been married to drummer Danny Sahupala since 1998. She gave birth to her first child, a daughter, on 2 July 2009.

== Discography ==
=== Albums ===
- 2001 – Meant to Be

=== Singles ===
- 1999 – "Ik kan het niet alleen" (duet with Gordon Heuckeroth)
- 1999 – "One Good Reason"
- 2000 – "I Don't O U Anything"
- 2001 – "I Quit"
- 2001 – "Water for Wine"

Awards and achievements
Preceded by Edsilia Rombley with "Hemel en aarde"	Netherlands in the Eurovision Song Contest; 1999	Succeeded by Linda Wagenmakers with "No Goodbyes"
