= Remindstate =

Studio album by Pete Philly and Perquisite
- Released: 13 January 2006
- Genre: Hip hop
- Label: Epitaph
- Producer: Pete Philly & Perquisite

Pete Philly and Perquisite chronology
| Mindstate (2005) | Remindstate (2006) | Mystery Repeats (2007) |

Remindstate is the remixed version of Mindstate, the debut album by Dutch hip hop duo Pete Philly and Perquisite. The album was released on January 13, 2006 on Epitaph.

== Track listing ==
| # | Title | Length | Featuring |
|---|---|---|---|
| 1 | "Intro (Perquisite Remix)" | 1:14 | |
| 2 | "Relieved (New generation Big Band Remix)" | 3:20 | |
| 3 | "Insomnia (Laagman remix)" | 3:44 | |
| 4 | "Motivated (Crackman remix)" | 3:53 | |
| 5 | "Eager (Perquisite remix)" | 4:27 | |
| 6 | "Lazy (Collective Efforts Remix)" | 4:41 | |
| 7 | "Respect (C-mon & Kypski Remix)" | 3:56 | |
| 8 | "Cocksure (Laidback Luke Remix)" | 6:00 | |
| 9 | "Grateful (Nicolay Remix)" | 3:37 | |
| 10 | "Beyond Words" | 1:01 | |
| 11 | "Mindstate (Arts the Beatdoctor Remix)" | 4:46 | |
| 12 | "Mellow (Morgan Spacek Remix) | 4:18 | Senna Gourdou |
| 13 | "Paranoid (Darin G Remix)" | 4:51 | |
| 14 | "Cheeky (DJ PCM Remix)" | 5:31 | Cee Major |
| 15 | "Hope (DJ Mitsu Remix)" | 4:51 | Talib Kweli |
| 16 | "Amazed" (Seiji Remix)" | 6:17 | |
| 17 | "Cocksure (Pete Philly Remix)" | 3:56 | |

== Chart ==
| Chart (2007) | Peak position |
|---|---|
| Dutch Albums (Album Top 100) | 49 |
