= Beatzarre =

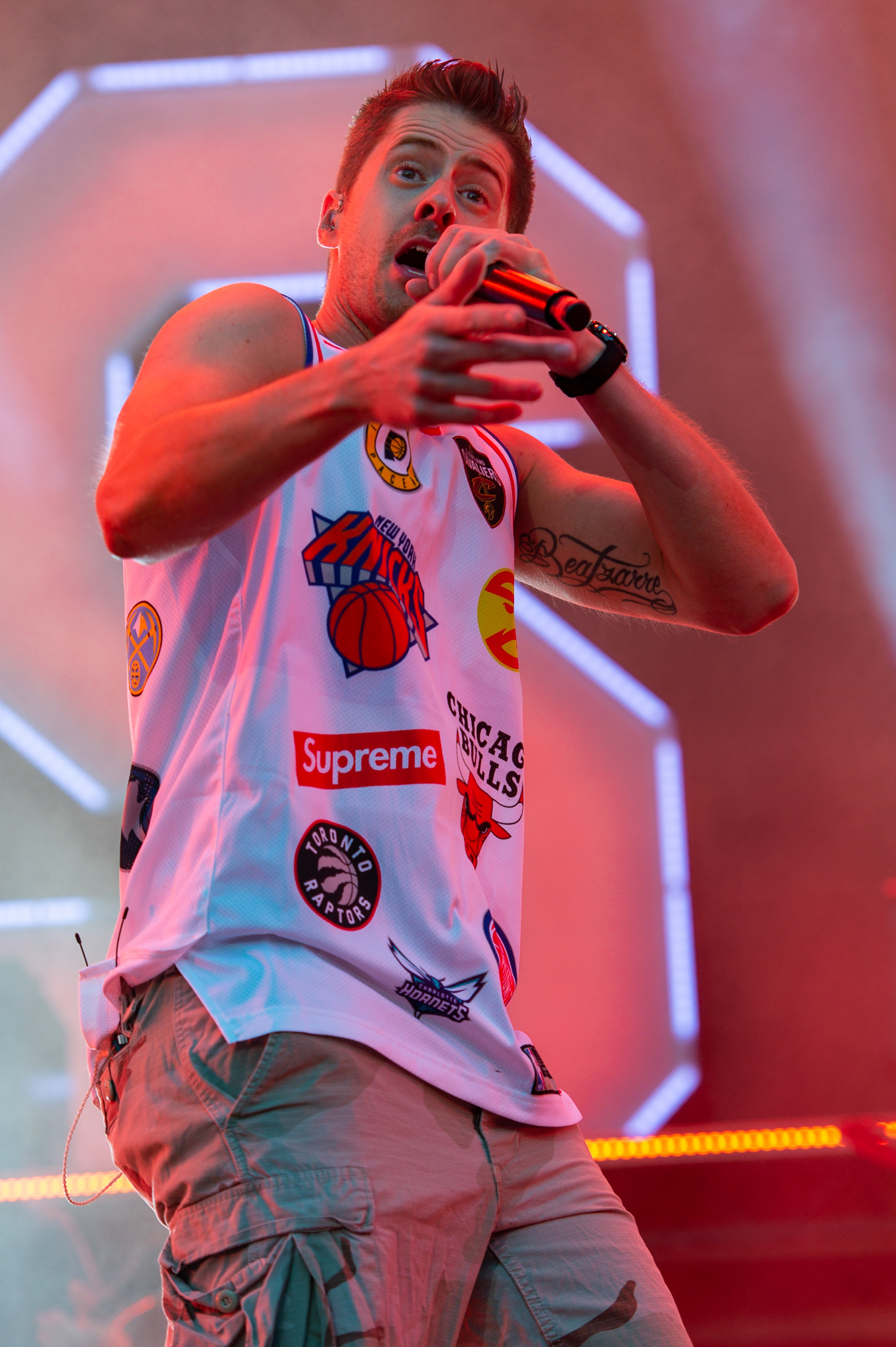
- Beatzarre in 2019

Background information
- Born: Vincent Stein; 10 October 1983 (age 42); Berlin, Germany
- Origin: Berlin
- Genres: Hip hop music
- Occupations: Rapper, songwriter

Vincent Stein (born 10 October 1983), known professionally as Beatzarre, is a German music producer, singer, rapper, songwriter and photographer. He became known both as a musician and member of the all-around duo SDP, and through his work as a producer in the German hip-hop scene. He frequently collaborates with producer Djorkaeff.

After Dieter Bohlen and the producers The Cratez, he is, along with Djorkaeff, the music producer with the third most number-one hits in Germany. He also ranks fourth on the list of musicians with the most BVMI-certified record sales.

== Life and career ==
Beatzarre began experimenting with rock and punk in the late 1990s. According to his own account, he only came to hip-hop through his interest in crossover music between rock and hip-hop, such as Rage Against the Machine. Beatzarre first appeared in 2004 as the producer of a remix of the song "Geht's dir schon besser" by the pop duo Ich + Ich. Soon after, he produced songs for the rapper Prinz Pi and in the following years for various rappers (e.g., Sera Finale, G-Hot, MC Basstard), primarily from the Berlin scene. He has been working with the Akai MPC von Akai (eg. Akai MPC 2000), which is well-known on the scene, since his early days.

Beatzarre became known to a wider audience in 2009 through his collaboration on the album Fler by the rapper of the same name. This was followed by productions for other well-known rappers such as Sido and Bushido as well as various national and international pop productions.

Stein studied music, education, and communication sciences at the master's level, but does not hold a degree. For the university, Stein conducted a field study on the delivery of educational content. This research project is called "Rapucation", which visited Berlin primary schools and presented rap songs with an educational focus. "Rapucation" is part of the 2007 thesis of Robin Haefs at the SAE Institute.

In 2014, he produced and wrote the winning song "The One" for Deutschland sucht den Superstar contestant Aneta Sablik together with Djorkaeff, B-Case and composer Oliver Pum ihren Siegersong The One. A week later, the track was number one in the German, Austrian and Swiss singles charts.

Beatzarre became known primarily for producing music for rappers such as Capital Bra, Bushido, Sido, Fler, Cro and Samra as well as singers Mark Forster and Vanessa Mai. He frequently collaborates with the producer Djorkaeff.

He also works as a photographer and has already taken official press photos for artists such as Capital Bra, Samra, Sido, Bushido, Clueso and Alligatoah.

== Discography ==
=== As author and producer ===
Soundtracks
Year	Title Music Label	Notes
2013	Fack ju Göhte Polydor (UMG)	First published: 8 November 2013
2015	3 Türken und ein Baby Very Us Records (WVG)	First published: 23 January 2015
2015	Fack ju Göhte 2 Polydor (UMG)	First published: 11 September 2015
2015	Macho Man Bavaria Sonor Records (BSR)	First published: 23 October 2015
2017	My Blind Date with Life Amboss Recordings (Amboss)	First published: 26 January 2017
2017	Fack ju Göhte 3 Polydor (UMG)	First published: 17 November 2017

=== With SDP ===
Studio albums

Year	Title Music Label	Chart positions			Notes
Year	Title Music Label	Germany	Austria	Switzerland	Notes
2004	Räuberpistolen Berliner Plattenbau (BP)	—	—	—	First published: 14 June 2004
2006	… nur Musik ist schöner. Berliner Plattenbau (RTA)	—	—	—	First published: 7 April 2006
2008	Die Rache des kleinen Mannes Berliner Plattenbau (SMD)	—	—	—	First published: 25 July 2008
2010	Kontrastprogramm Berliner Plattenbau (SMD)	—	—	—	First published: 10 December 2010
2012	Die bekannteste unbekannte Band der Welt Berliner Plattenbau (H’Art)	51 (1 week)	—	—	First published: 19 October 2012
2014	Bunte Rapublik Deutschpunk Berliner Plattenbau (SMD)	4 (3 weeks)	56 (1 week)	—	First published: 10 January 2014
2015	Zurück in die Zukunst Berliner Plattenbau (Chapter ONE)	2 [] (17 weeks)	43 (1 week)	64 (1 week)	First published: 22 May 2015 Sales: +100,000
2017	Die bunte Seite der Macht Berliner Plattenbau (Chapter ONE)	2 [] (34 weeks)	5 (3 weeks)	17 (2 weeks)	First published: 10 March 2017 Sales: +100,000
2019	Die unendlichste Geschichte Berliner Plattenbau (Chapter ONE)	1 [] (27 weeks)	4 (3 weeks)	14 (2 weeks)	First release: 1 March 2019 Sales: +100,000
2022	Ein gutes schlechtes Vorbild Berliner Plattenbau (Chapter ONE)	1 [] (36 weeks)	5 (3 weeks)	10 (2 weeks)	First release: 2 June 2022 Sales: +100,000
2025	Die wollen nur spielen Nur Musik ist schöner (UMG)	2 (6 weeks)	5 (2 weeks)	17 (1 week)	First published: 30 October 2025

== Awards (selection) ==
- Echo Pop
  - 2010: Best video (national) for the single Hey du! by Sido
  - 2012: Best video (national) for the single So mach ich es by 23
- 1 Live Krone 2022 "Best Live Act" as part of SDP
