= Florian von Bornstädt =

German writer and screenwriter

Florian von Bornstädt (German pronunciation: [ˈfloːʁi̯aːn fɔn ˈbɔʁnʃtɛt]; born 26 August 1991 in Itzehoe) is a German writer and screenwriter, known for the Netflix original film The Four of Us.

== Life ==
Florian von Bornstädt grew up in Kellinghusen and completed with the Mittlere Reife at the local secondary school. After school he started a vocational training as a media designer at h1 - Fernsehen aus Hannover, a regional German TV channel. In the meantime he wrote the script for his first short film Little Red Riding Hood: A Tale of Blood and Death. He shared the directing position with Martin Czaja. This was followed by two more short films in sole direction, which were shown at international film festivals. In his second short film, He was there again, he worked i.a. with the actor and voice actor Charles Rettinghaus.

In 2015 he wrote the script for the horror film #funnyFACE, directed by Marcel Walz and filmed in Spain in 2015. After the premiere in 2015 at the Weekend of Horrors in Germany, the film was finally released for home theater in December 2019. From 2016 to 2017 von Bornstädt worked as a storyliner for various German daily series. In May 2018 he published his first novel, Am Ende noch Meer, based on an unfilmed screenplay, via Kindle Direct Publishing.

Von Bornstädt wrote the screenplay for the film The Four of Us, which was released on Netflix on October 15, 2021. Jonas Nay, Paula Kalenberg, Nilam Farooq and Louis Nitsche can be seen in the leading roles. He also joined the team of authors for the second season of the ZDF series Doktor Ballouz in 2021.

=== Private life ===
Von Bornstädt lives in Berlin since July 2017.

== Filmography ==
| Year | Title | Writer | Director | Notes |
|---|---|---|---|---|
| 2013 | Little Red Riding Hood: A Tale of Blood and Death | Yes | Yes | short film, also producer |
| 2015 | He was there again | Yes | Yes | short film, also producer |
| 2015 | #funnyFACE | Yes | No | |
| 2015 | The Painter | Yes | Yes | short film |
| 2021 | The Four of Us | Yes | No | |

== Bibliography ==
- 2018: Am Ende noch Meer - independently published
