= The Four of Us (film) =

- German: Du Sie Er & Wir
- Directed by: Florian Gottschick
- Written by: Florian von Bornstädt; Florian Gottschick
- Produced by: Seth Hollinderbäumer; Sven Sund
- Starring: Louis Nitsche; Jonas Nay; Paula Kalenberg; Nilam Farooq; Tim Oliver Schultz; Janina Elkin
- Cinematography: Lukas Steinbach; Christof Wahl
- Edited by: Christoph Dechant
- Music by: Jonas Nay; David Grabowski
- Production company: Red Pony Pictures powered by Saxonia Media Filmproduktion
- Distributed by: Netflix
- Release date: 15 October 2021
- Running time: 88 minutes
- Country: Germany
- Language: German

The Four of Us is a 2021 German film directed by Florian Gottschick, written by Florian von Bornstädt and starring Jonas Nay, Nilam Farooq and Paula Kalenberg. The film was released by Netflix in October 2021. The original title is Du Sie Er & Wir ("You She He & We").

== Plot ==
The Four of Us is a relationship drama involving two couples: the aspiring young journalist Janina (Nina) and her husband Ben, a struggling actor; and Janina's best friend Maria and Maria's boyfriend, the estate agent Nils. Four weeks previously, the four had agreed to a partner exchange, whereby Janina lived with Nils, and Maria with Ben, with an understanding that there should be no intimacy. The aim was that each should learn more about what they really want in a relationship. As the film opens, they gather at a holiday house by the beach on the North Sea to discuss their experiences. It soon becomes apparent that all four of them have broken the no-sex rule, and it appears that Ben and Maria are in love, and Janina is pregnant from Nils. Over the next two days they try to find a way of moving forward, other truths emerge, and it becomes clear that all of them have changed in their feelings and expectations of love.

Most of the film plays in the house and on the beach, and involves only the four main characters. Secondary characters appear only in the brief scenes in the city at the beginning and end of the film that show the protagonists in their everyday lives: Janina's colleague Anton and her boss Ann-Kathrin; Nils' clients, the family Bolschakow; an actress playing against Ben in a scene from a soap opera; and the staff at a clinic.

== Production ==
The Four of Us was produced by Red Pony Pictures, a label of the Saxonia Media Filmproduktion. Filming took place from 25 November to 18 December 2020 in Tetenbüll (Schleswig-Holstein) and in Hamburg. The film was released on 15 October 2021 as a Netflix Original on the Netflix streaming service.

== Cast ==
- Nilam Farooq as Janina
- Paula Kalenberg as Maria
- Jonas Nay as Nils
- Louis Nitsche as Ben
- Tim Oliver Schultz as Anton
- Paula Paul as Ann-Kathrin
- Janina Elkin as Mrs. Bolschakow
- Emma Riegel as Larissa Bolschakow
- Nora Huetz as Actress
- Manuel Ossenkopf as Doctor's Assistant
