= Contra (film) =

2020 film

- Directed by: Sönke Wortmann
- Starring: Christoph Maria Herbst; Nilam Farooq
- Music by: Martin Todsharow
- Distributed by: Constantin Film
- Release date: 1 October 2020 (ZFF)
- Running time: 108 minutes
- Country: Germany
- Language: German

Contra is a 2020 German comedy film based on the French film Le Brio.

== Plot ==
Law professor Richard Pohl (Christoph Maria Herbst) makes a racist remark when student Naima (Nilam Farooq) arrives late for his lecture. To avoid disciplinary measures Pohl agrees to tutor Naima for a debating competition.

== Cast ==
- Christoph Maria Herbst - Professor Richard Pohl
- Nilam Farooq - Naima Hamid
- Hassan Akkouch - Mohammed
- Ernst Stötzner - Professor Lambrecht
- Stefan Gorski - Benjamin
