= SDP (duo) =

German pop/hip hop duo

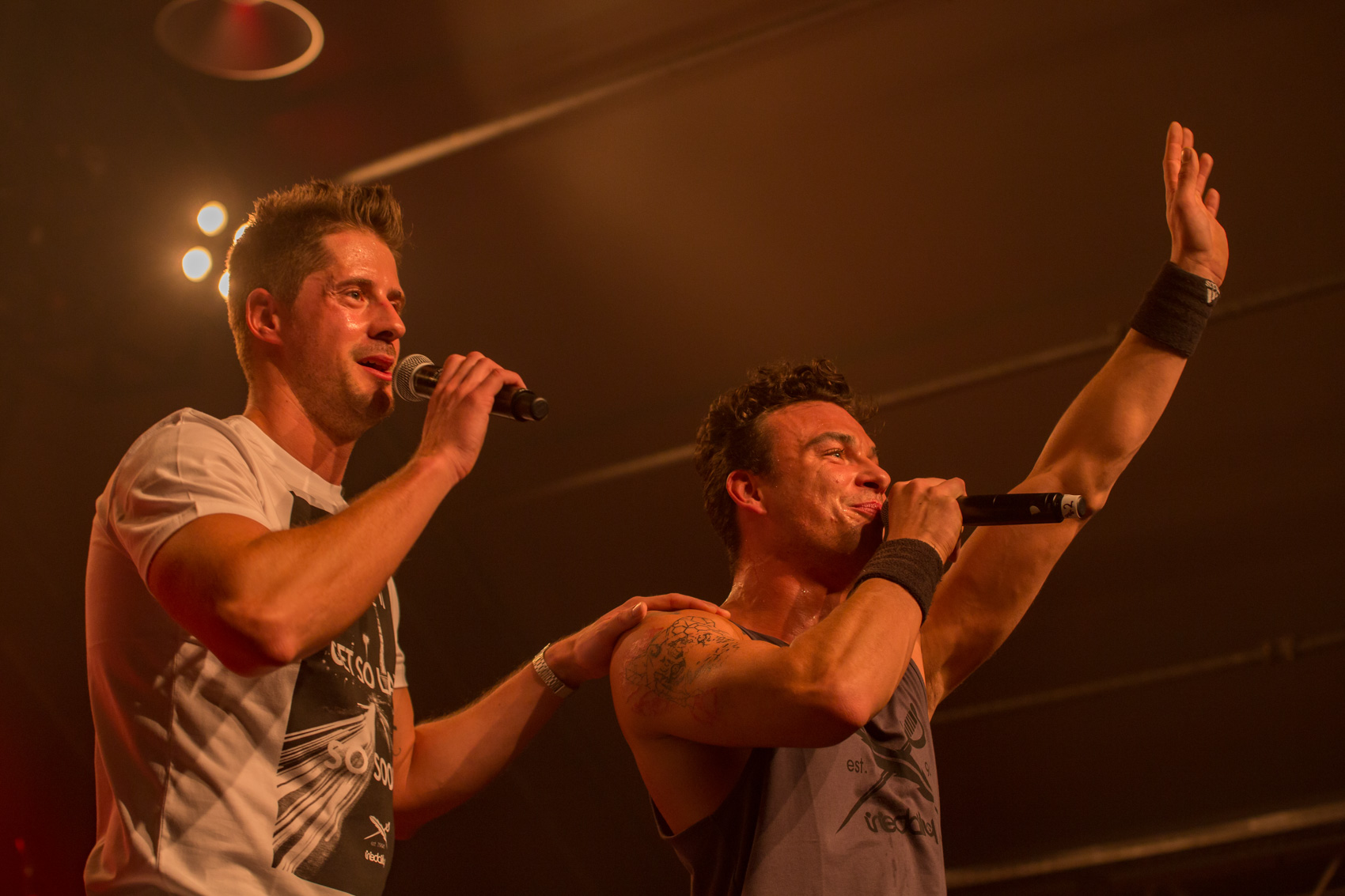
- SDP performing in 2015

Background information
- Origin: Germany
- Genres: German pop, hip hop, dance, reggae, rock, reggaeton
- Years active: 1999–present
- Label: Berliner Plattenbau
- Members: Vincent Stein; Dag-Alexis Kopplin

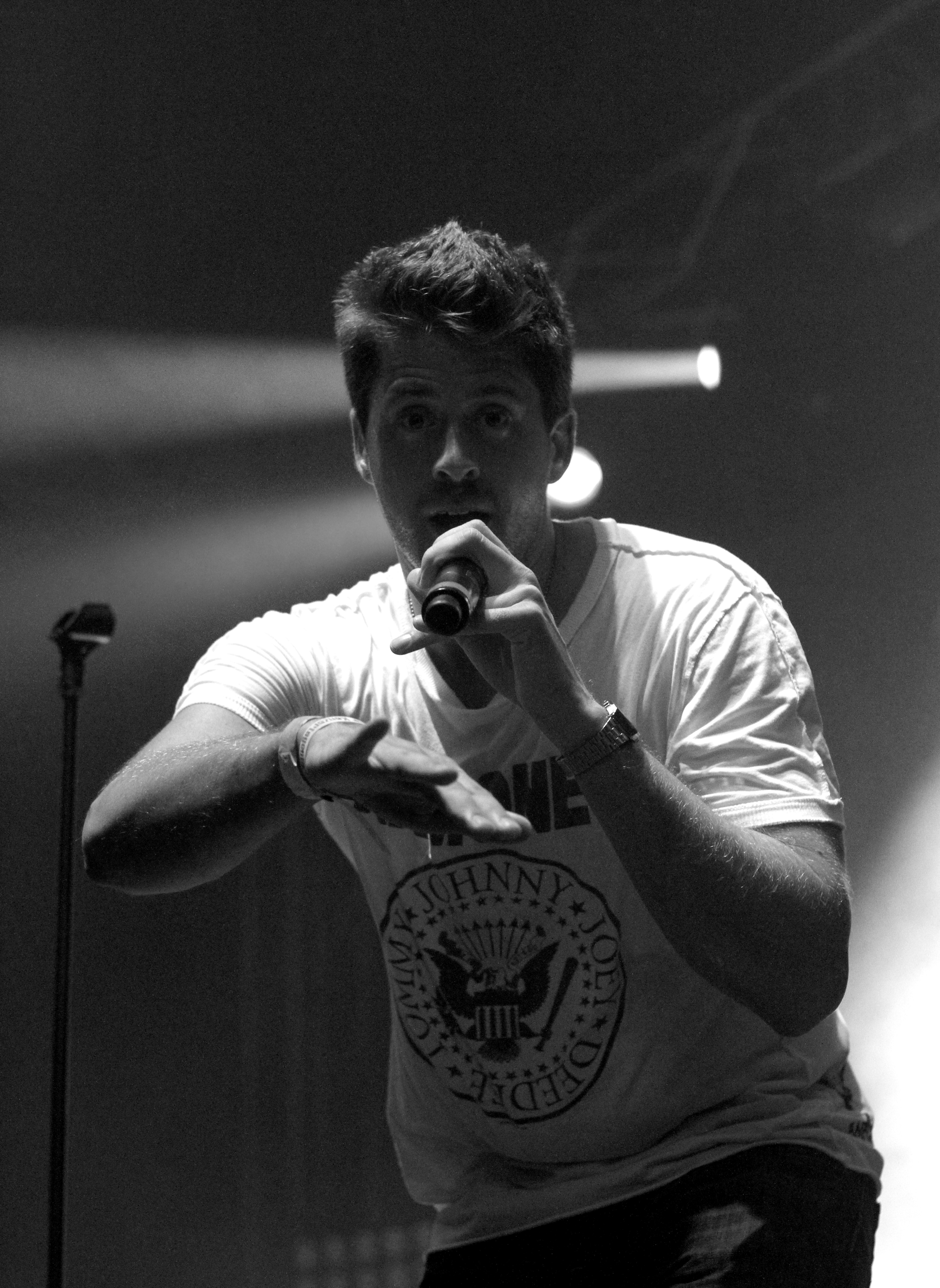
Vincent Stein aka Beatzarre (2013)

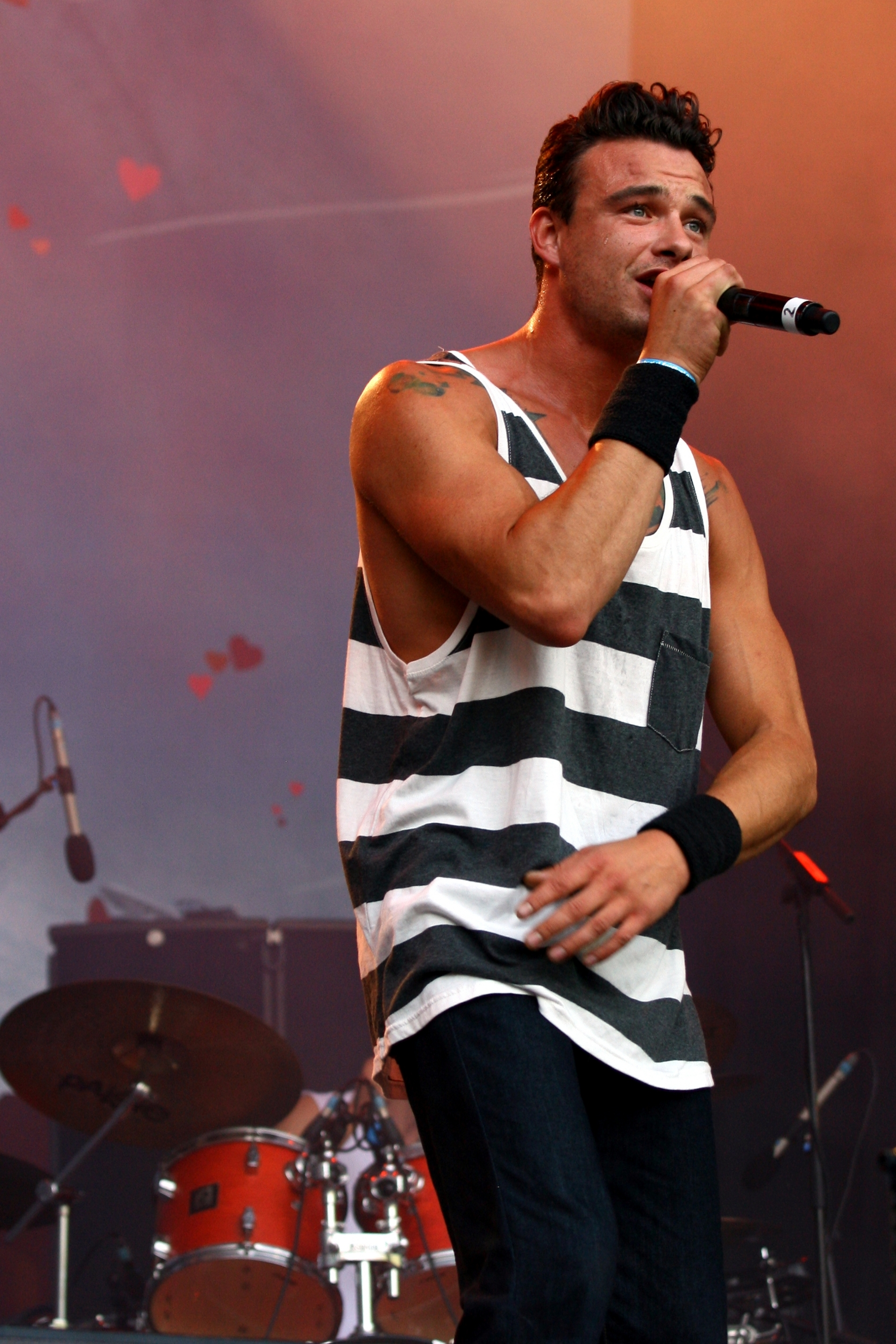
Dag-Alexis Kopplin (2014)

SDP, an abbreviation of Stonedeafproduction, is a German pop/hip hop duo made up of singer and producer Vincent Stein and singer and guitarist Dag-Alexis Kopplin. The duo is signed to the Berliner Plattenbau label.

The band was founded in 1999 in Berlin-Spandau as Stonedeafproduction before shortening its name to SDP. The band performs live with an accompanying band of musicians that changes, but mainly includes Raphael Seidel (bass), Phil Sunday (guitar), Thilo Brandt (drums) and Mad Maks (as DJ).

Vincent Stein (born 10 October 1983 in Berlin) is also known as a producer with the stage name Beatzarre who produced for German rapper like Bushido, Sido and Fler and for pop duo Ich + Ich made up of Adel Tawil and Annette Humpe and many others.

== Discography ==
=== Studio albums ===
Year	Title	Chart positions		
Year	Title	GER	AUT	SWI
2004	Räuberpistolen	—	—	—
2006	... Nur Musik ist schöner	—	—	—
2008	Die Rache des kleinen Mannes	—	—	—
2010	Kontrastprogramm	—	—	—
2012	Die bekannteste unbekannte Band der Welt	51	—	—
2014	Bunte Rapublik Deutschpunk	4	56	—
2015	Zurück in die Zukunst	2	43	64
2017	Die bunte Seite der Macht	2	5	17
2019	Die unendlichste Geschichte	1	4	14
2022	Ein gutes schlechtes Vorbild	1	5	10
2025	Die wollen nur spielen	2	5	17

=== Live albums ===
Year	Title	Chart positions		
Year	Title	GER	AUT	SWI
2020	20 Jahre – Die einmalige Jubiläums-Show (Live aus Berlin)	2	41	71

Demo albums

- 2002: Angriff aus Berlin

=== EPs ===
Year	Title
2005	Wir sind SDP
2006	Antifußballmusik
2006	...hast du mal ein Problem
2007	Anfangen Anzufangen
2007	Antiknutmusik
2007	Fragen über Fragen
2008	Ganz oder gar nicht
2008	Wasserski fahr'n
2008	So genial
2008	Meine Welt
2010	Ne Leiche
2011	Ich steh auf Hausfrauen
2012	Wir ticken nicht ganz sauber
2016	Zeit verschwenden

=== Singles ===
Year	Title	Chart positions		
Year	Title	GER	AUT	SWI
2015	"Ich will nur dass du weißt" (featuring Adel Tawil)	15	41	41
2017	"So schön kaputt"	40	—	—
2019	"Unikat"	92	—	—

=== Other charted songs ===
Year	Title	Chart positions	
Year	Title	GER	AUT
2019	"Viva la Dealer"	38	71
