= Locked-in Society =

2022 German comedy film

- Theatrical release poster
- Directed by: Sönke Wortmann
- Screenplay by: Jan Weiler
- Based on: Eingeschlossene Gesellschaft by Jan Weiler
- Produced by: Jochen Cremer; Eva Holtmann; Michael Tinney
- Starring: Florian David Fitz; Anke Engelke; Nilam Farooq; Justus von Dohnányi; Thomas Loibl; Torben Kessler
- Cinematography: Jo Heim
- Edited by: Andrea Mertens
- Music by: Martin Todsharow
- Production companies: Deutsche Columbia Pictures Filmproduktion; Bantry Bay Productions; ARD Degeto
- Distributed by: Sony Pictures Entertainment Deutschland GmbH
- Release date: 14 April 2022
- Running time: 101 minutes
- Country: Germany
- Language: German
- Box office: $2,773,478

Locked-in Society (German: Eingeschlossene Gesellschaft) is a 2022 German comedy film directed by Sönke Wortmann. based on the audio play by Jan Weiler, it stars Florian David Fitz, Anke Engelke, Justus von Dohnányi, Nilam Farooq and Torben Kessler.

The film was released by Sony Pictures Entertainment Deutschland on 14 April 2022, where it received positive reviews from critics.

== Cast ==
- Florian David Fitz as Peter Mertens
- Anke Engelke as Heidi Lohmann
- Justus von Dohnányi as Klaus Engelhardt
- Nilam Farooq as Sarah Schuster
- Thomas Loibl as Holger Arndt
- Torben Kessler as Bernd Vogel
