= List of highest-certified music artists in Germany =

This list includes music artists with at least five million record sales in Germany, based on certifications by the BVMI (Bundesverband Musikindustrie). Artists are ranked in descending order.

Awards are only presented if and when a record company applies for certification, it is not done automatically. Only records that were declared to and registered by the BVMI receive awards. The BVMI began its certifications in 1975, therefore popular artists from earlier eras are generally not represented on this list. This excludes artists such as Heintje Simons, Peter Alexander, Freddy Quinn, Caterina Valente, or the Rolling Stones, and may explain the lower-than-expected sales figures for pre-1975 artists like The Beatles. Certifications are based on a record's release date.

Video albums have been included since 1991 and streaming since 2016. Until 5 April 2018, a unit was equal to 1000 streams for albums and 100 streams for singles. Those numbers were raised to 2000 streams for albums and 200 streams for singles on 6 April of that year.

== Artists by certified units ==
=== 13 million records or more ===
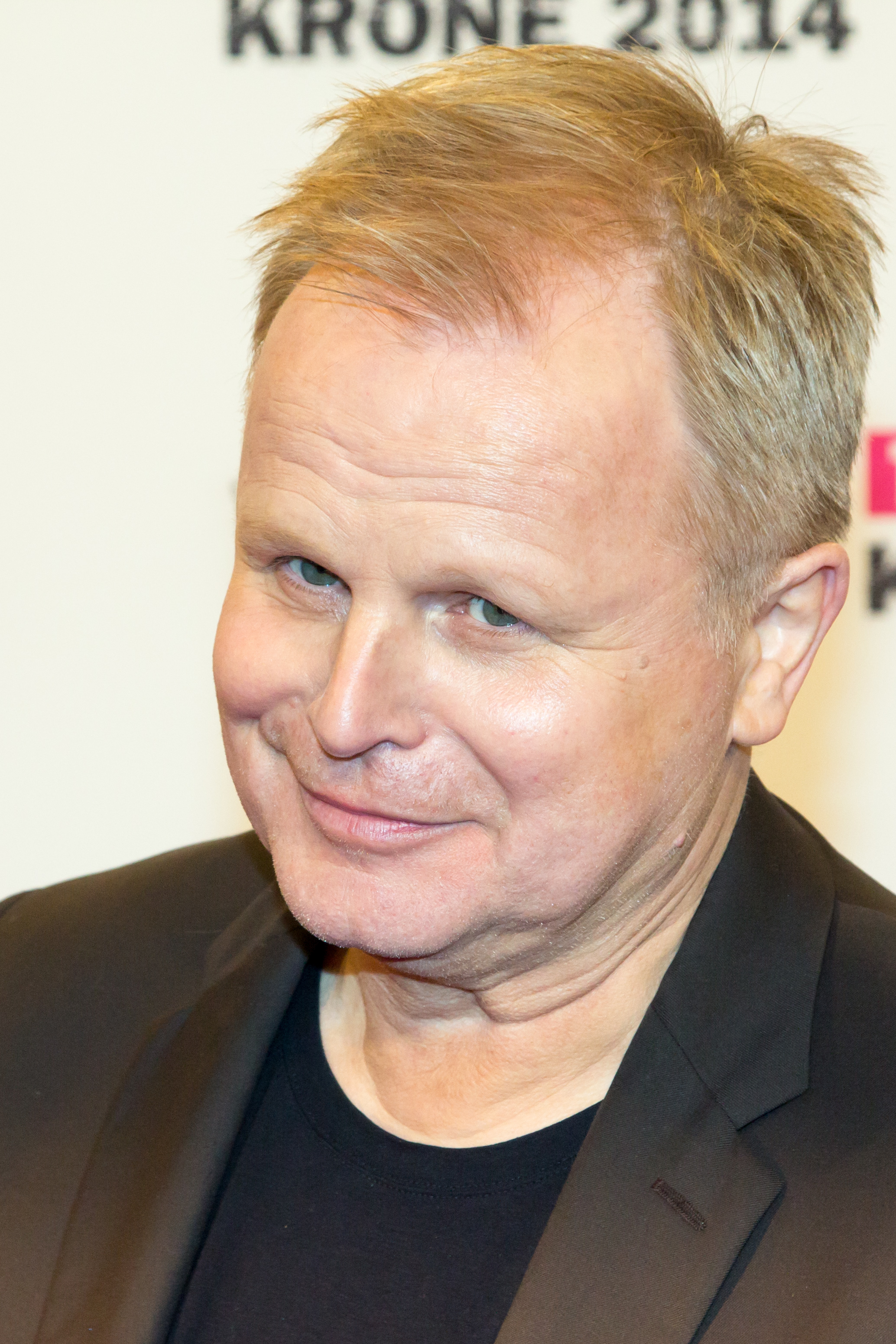
Herbert Grönemeyer

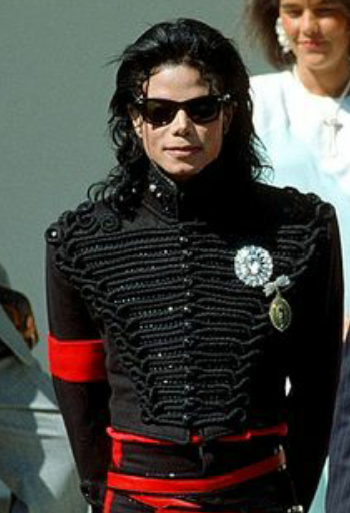
Michael Jackson

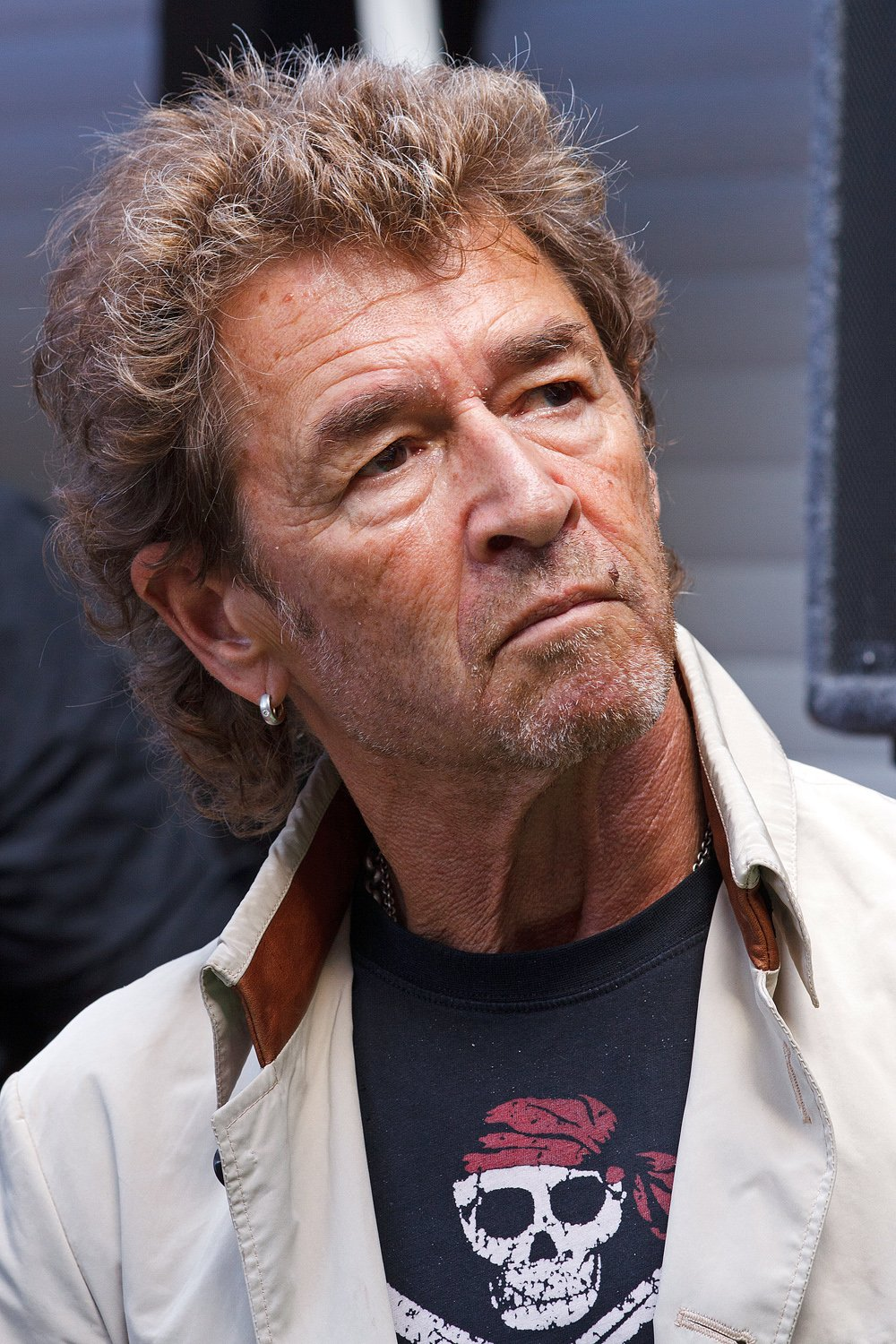
Peter Maffay

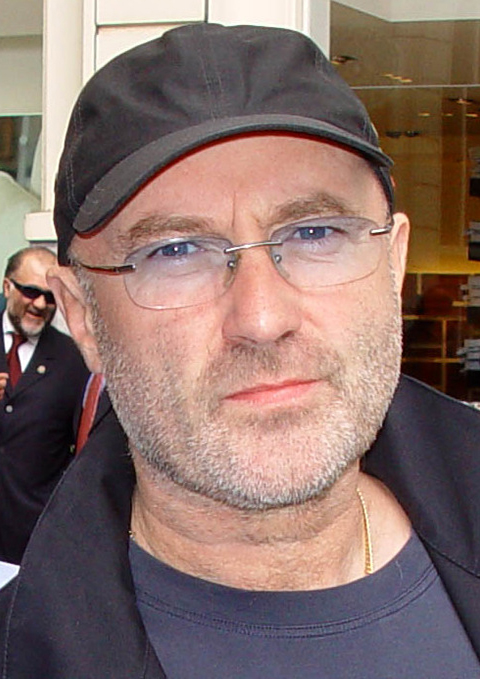
Phil Collins

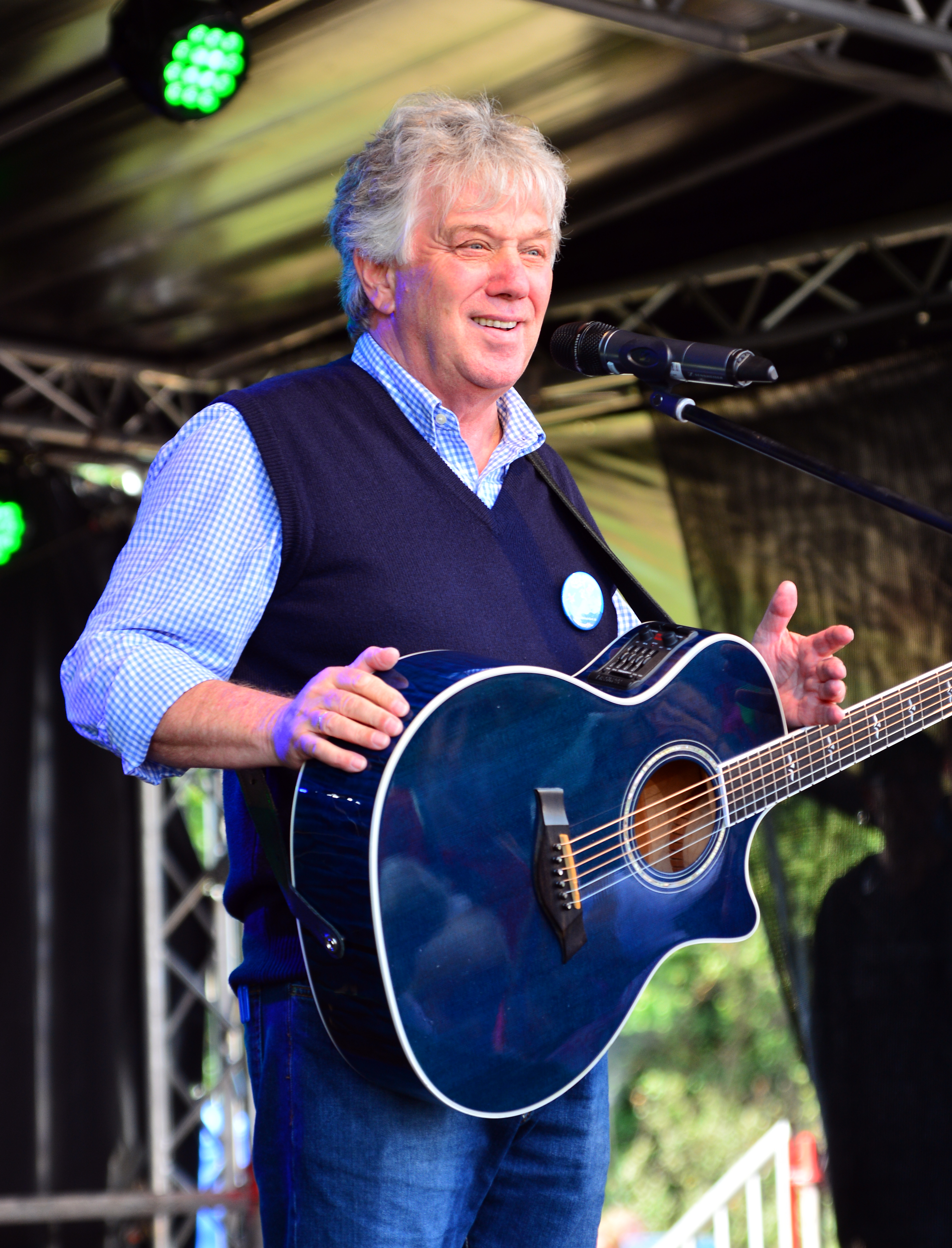
Rolf Zuckowski

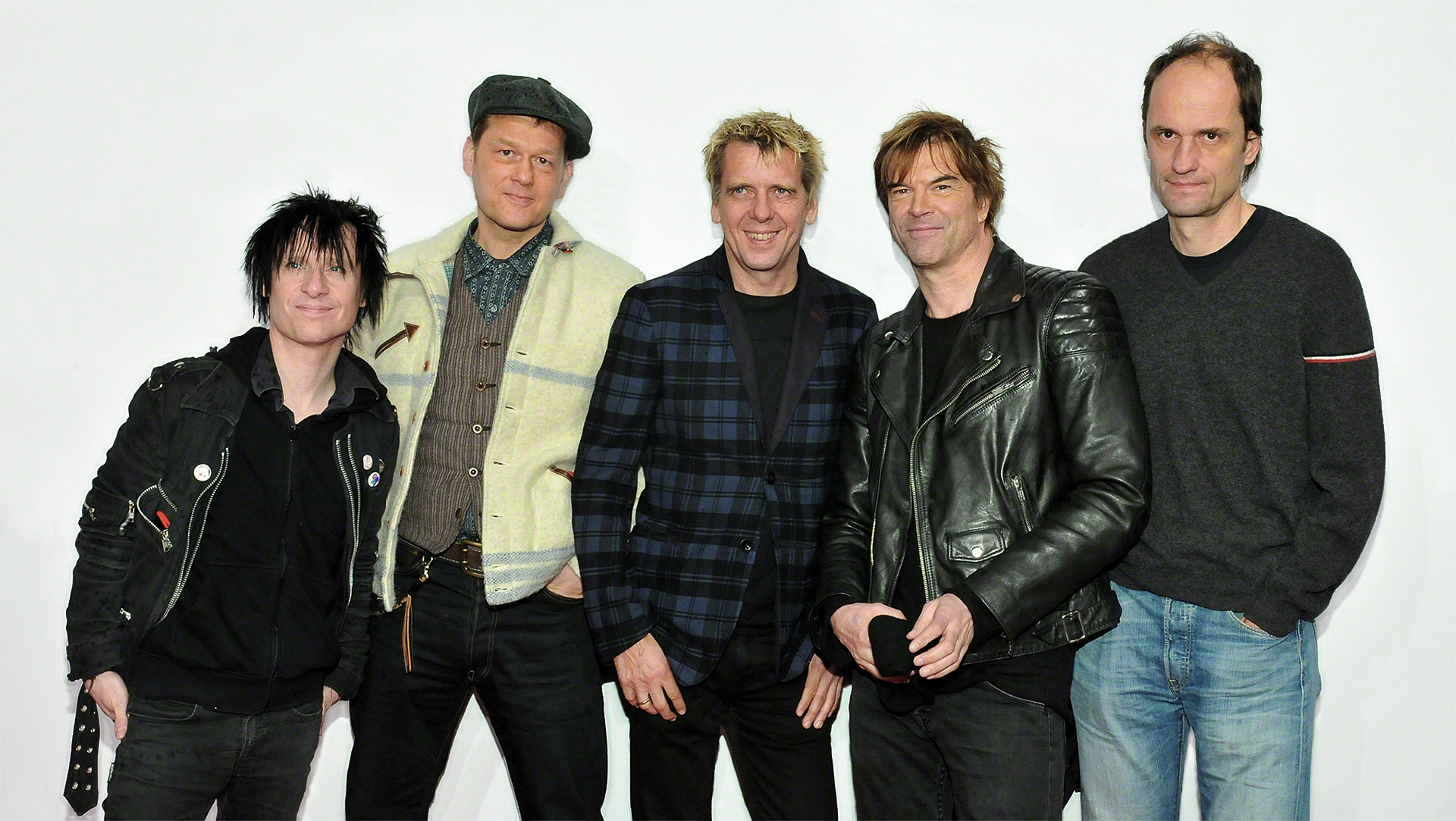
Die Toten Hosen

Name	Certification period	Certified units
Herbert Grönemeyer	1984–2018	18,075,000
Michael Jackson	1983–2026	15,125,000
Peter Maffay	1979–2018	14,350,000
Phil Collins	1981–2011	14,300,000
Rolf Zuckowski	1989–2012	13,975,000
Die Toten Hosen	1989–2018	13,650,000
Ed Sheeran	2012–2022	13,350,000

=== 11 to 12.9 million records ===
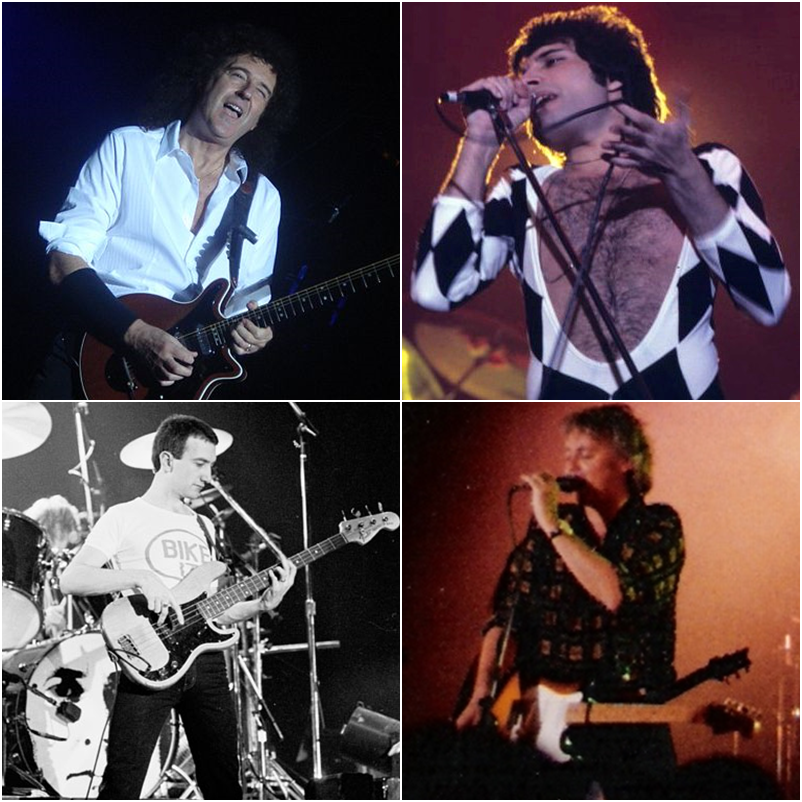
Queen

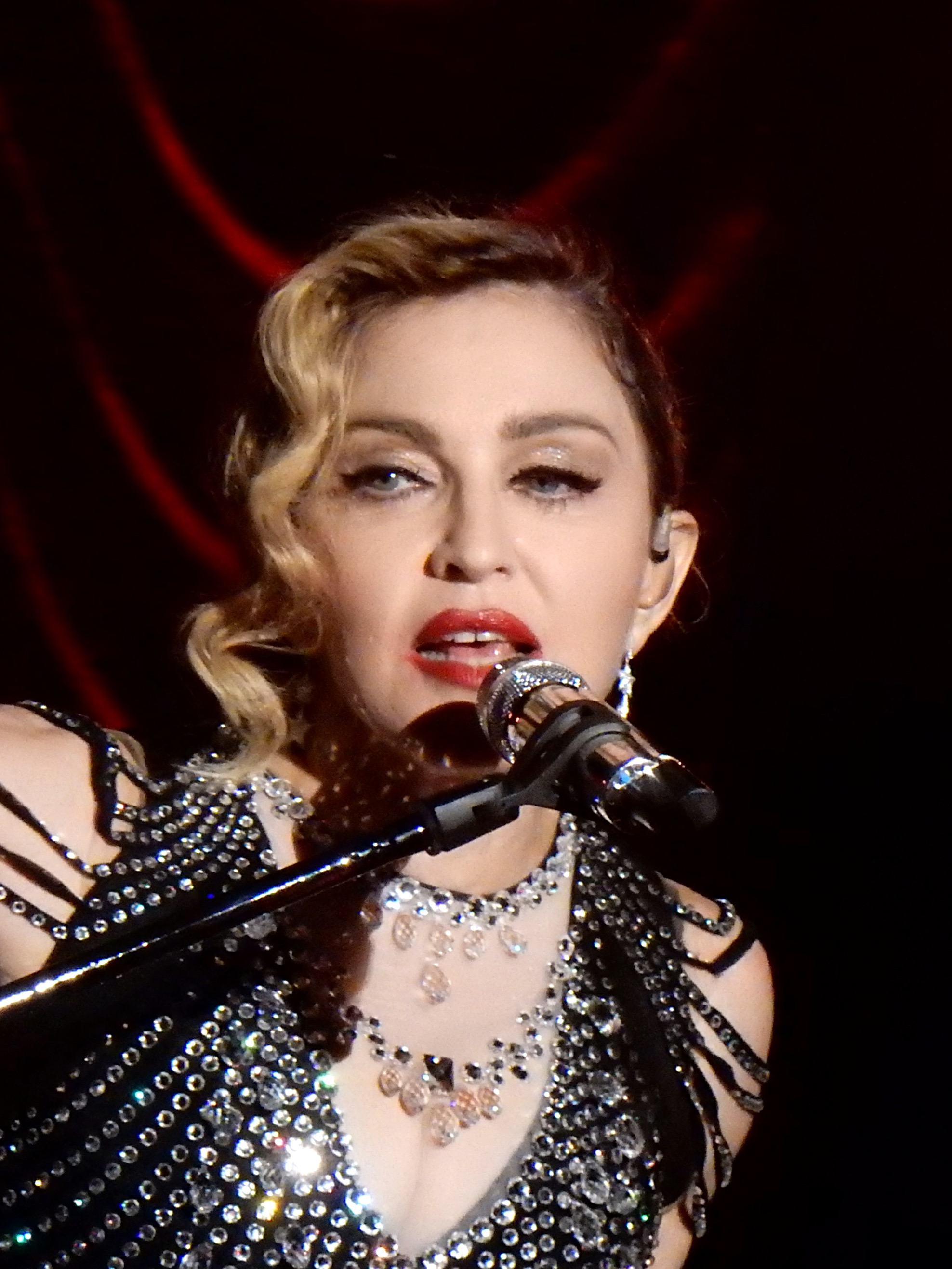
Madonna

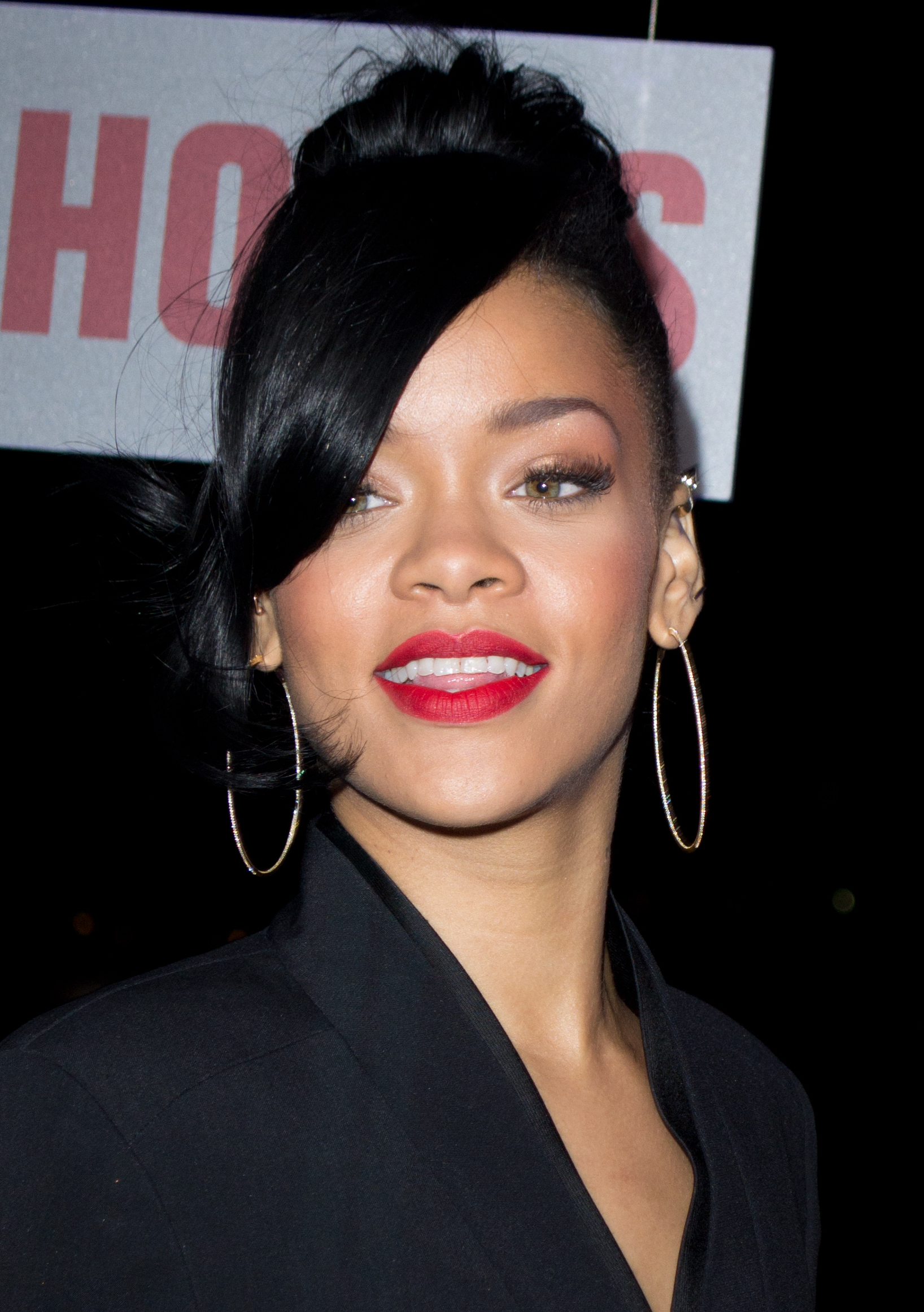
Rihanna

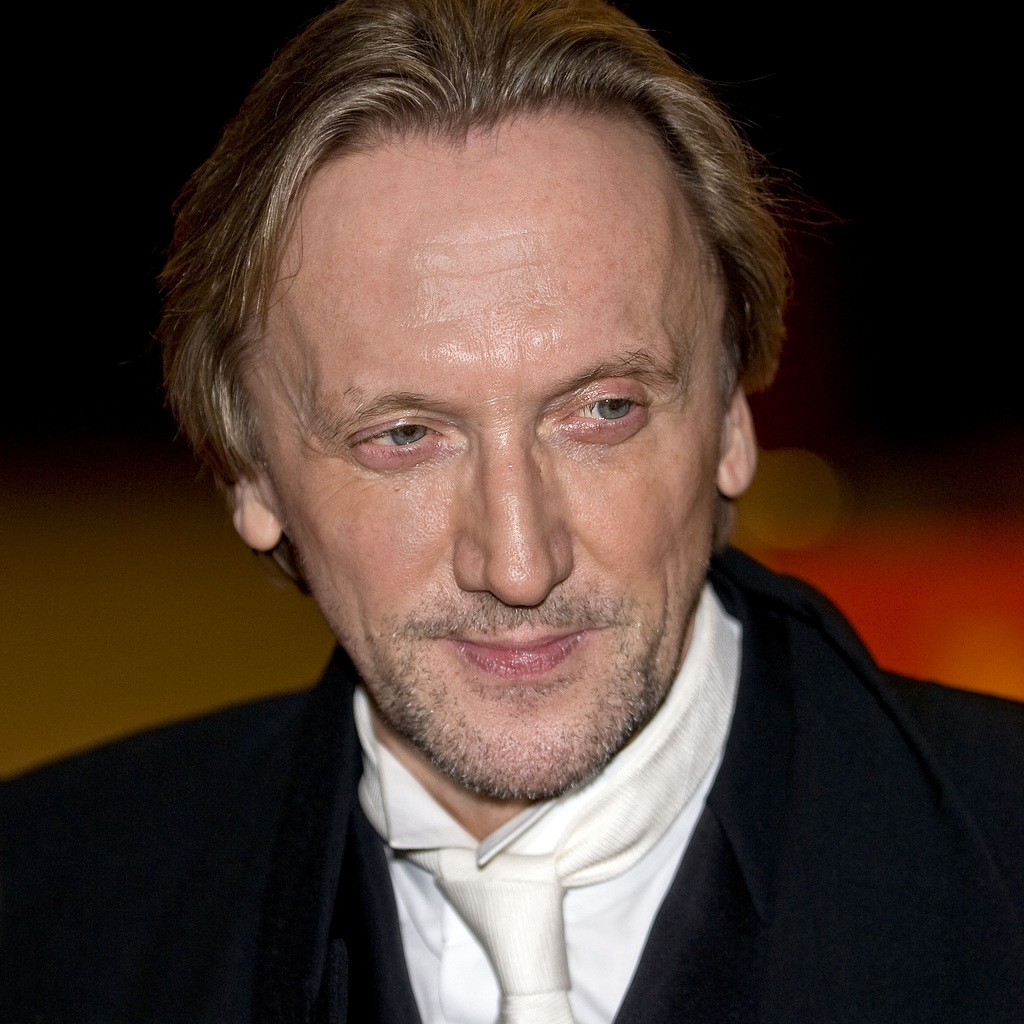
Marius Müller-Westernhagen

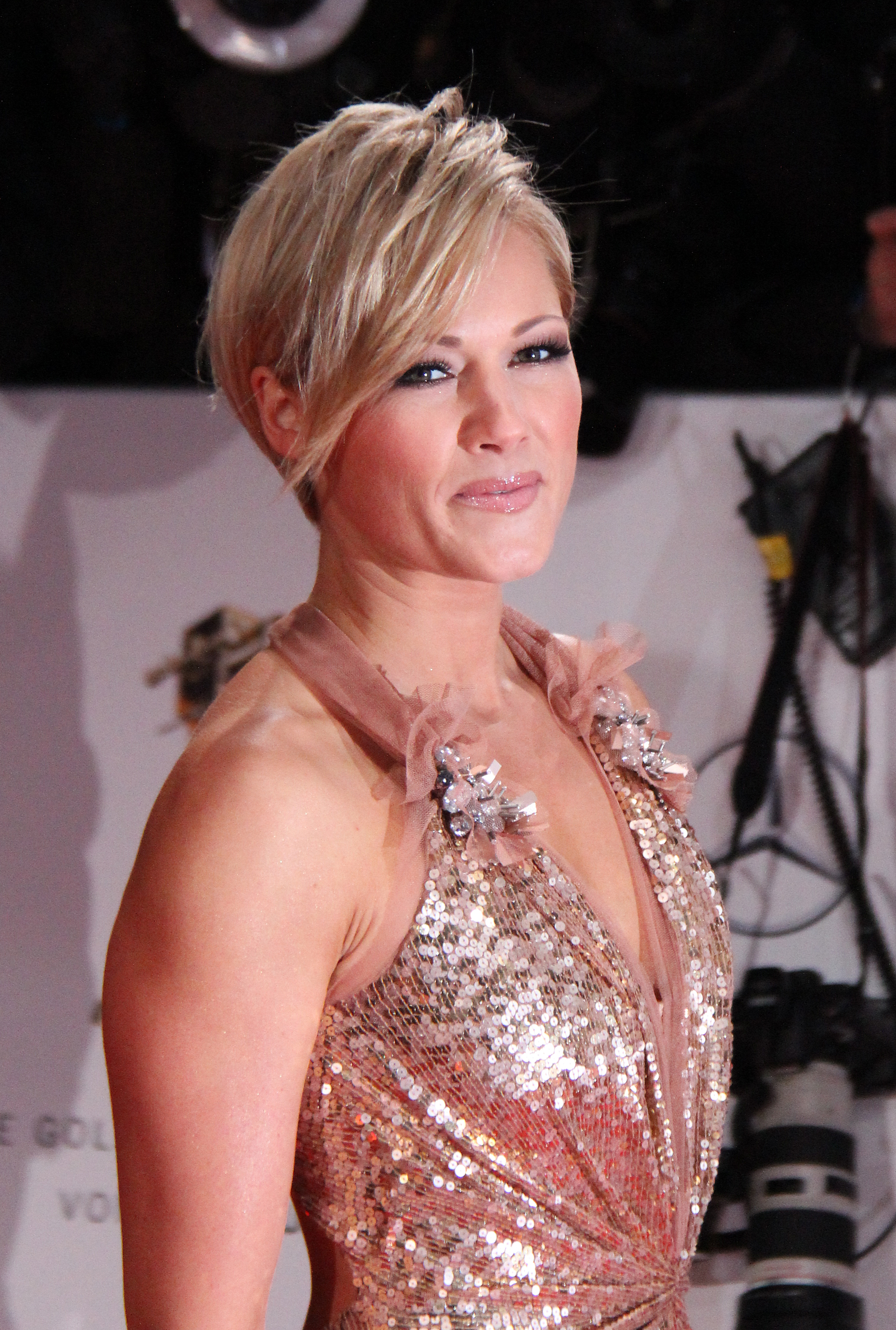
Helene Fischer

Name	Certification period	Certified units
Queen	1978–2018	12,625,000
Madonna	1985–2012	12,550,000
Rihanna	2007–2023	12,275,000
Marius Müller-Westernhagen	1981–2017	12,075,000
Helene Fischer	2007–2018	11,150,000

=== 9 to 10.9 million records ===
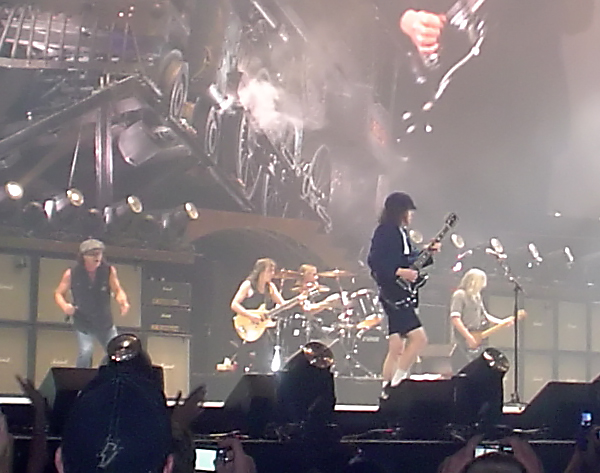
AC/DC

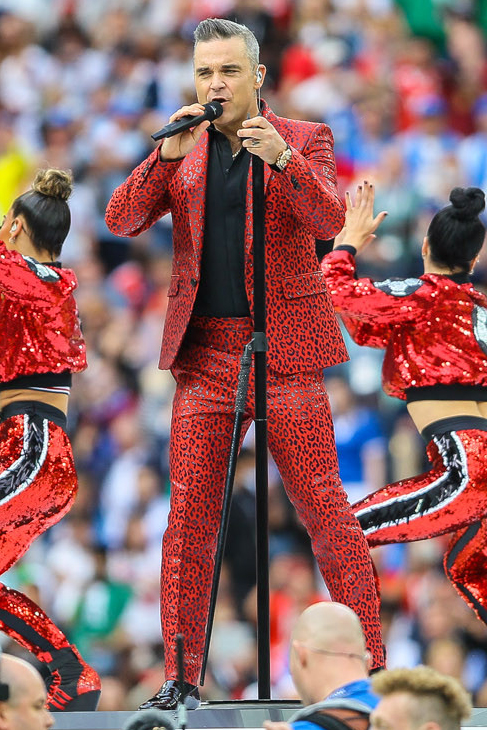
Robbie Williams

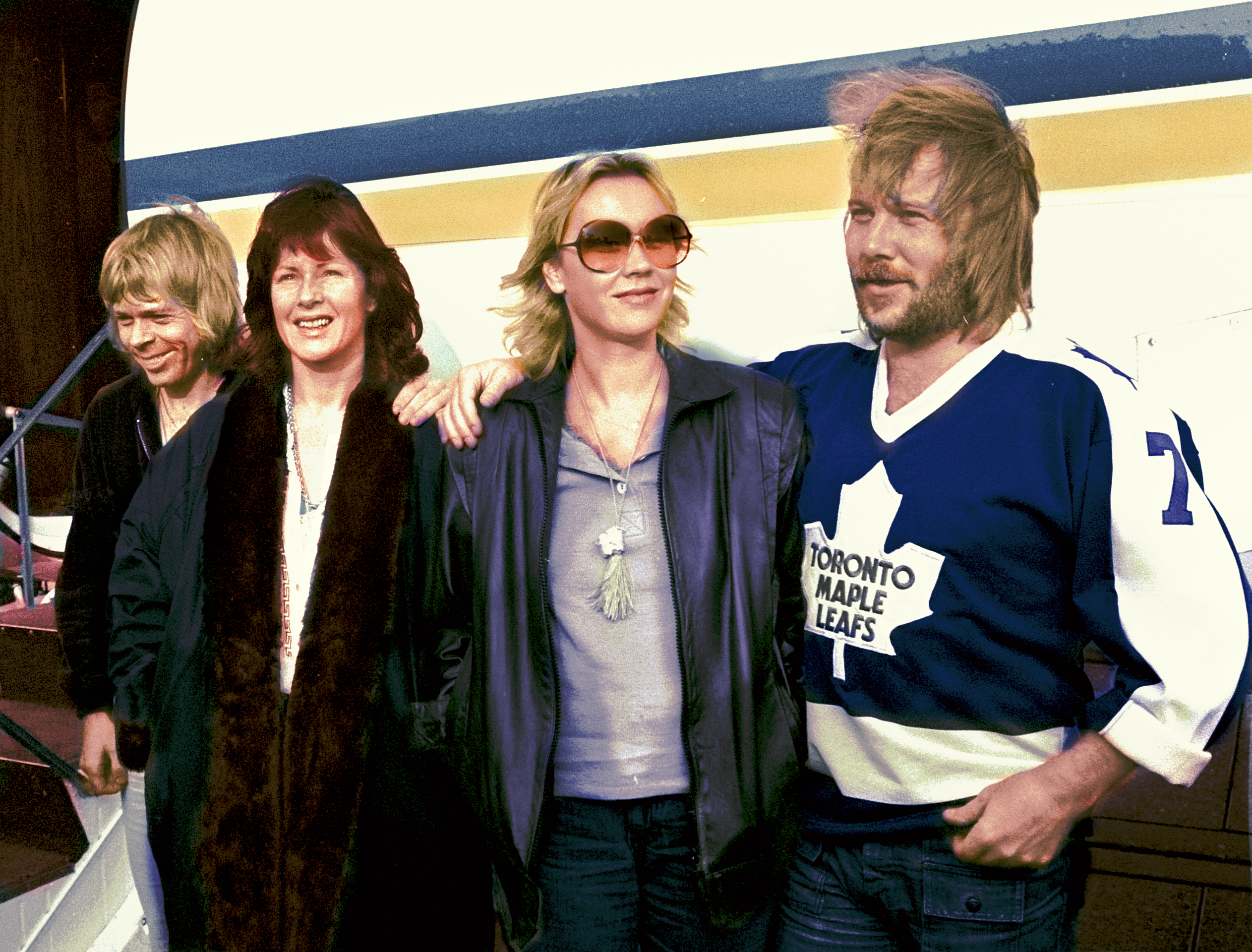
ABBA

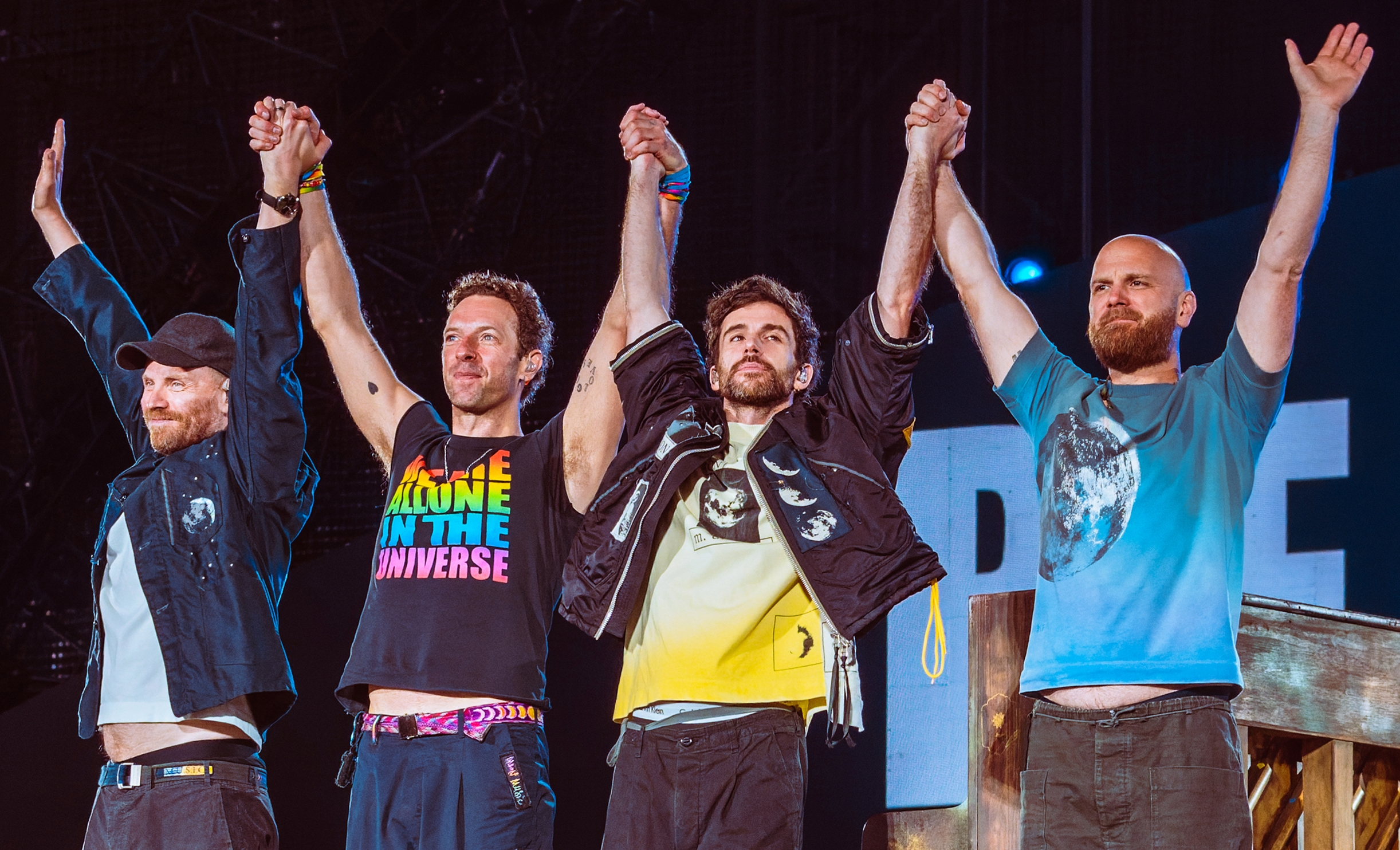
Coldplay

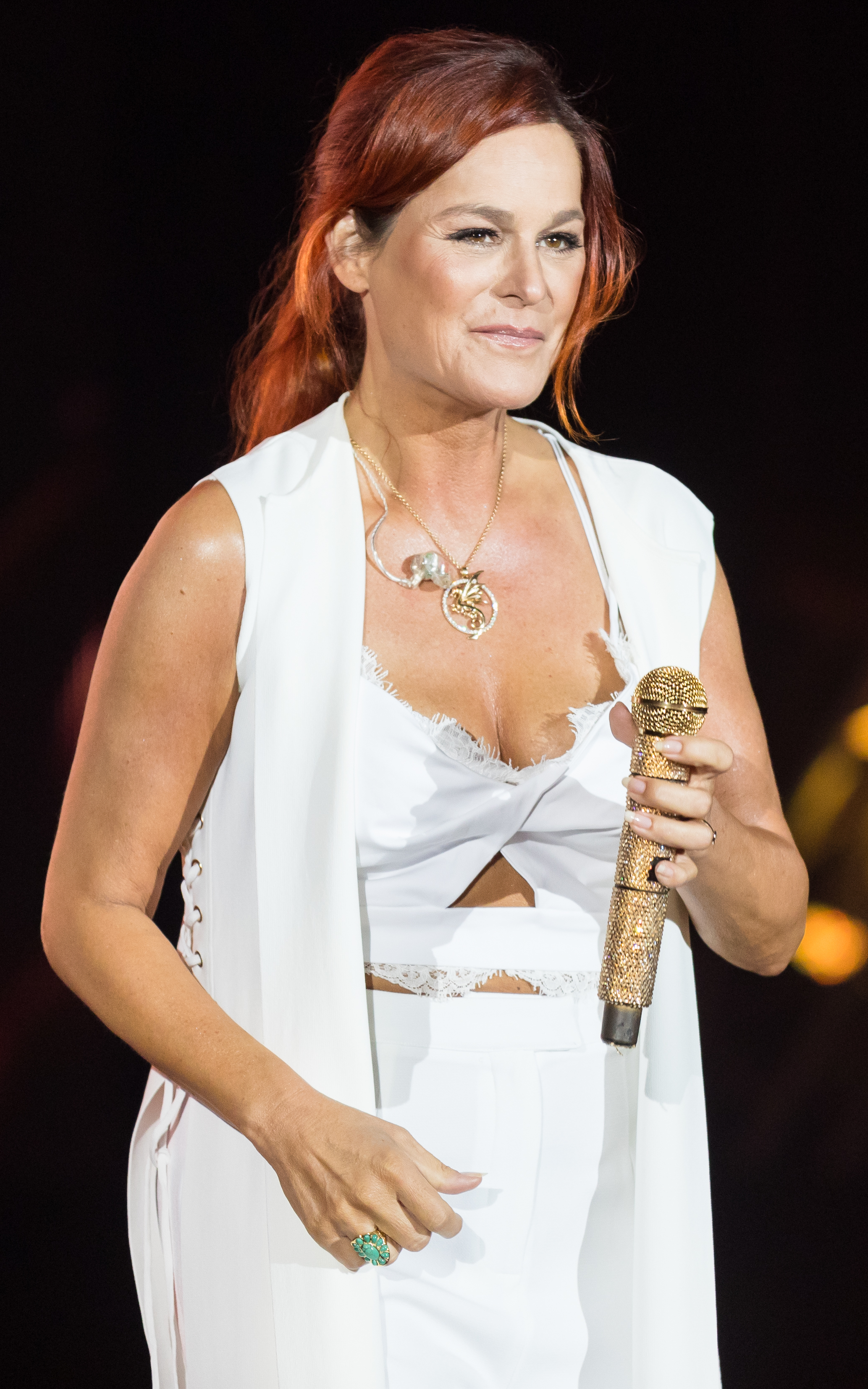
Andrea Berg

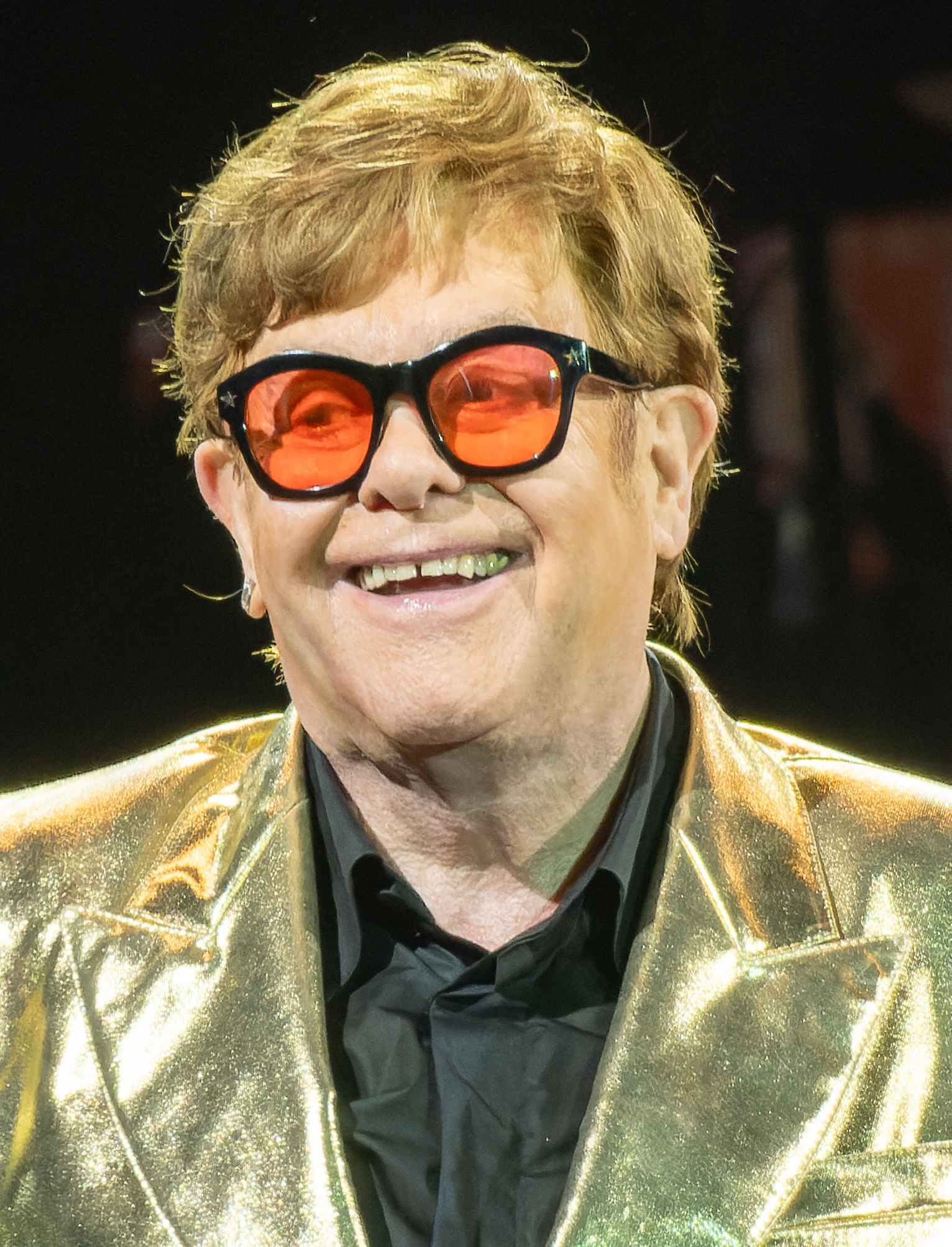
Elton John

Name	Certification period	Certified units
AC/DC	1980–2016	10,600,000
Robbie Williams	2000–2018	10,600,000
ABBA	1976–2008	10,550,000
Coldplay	2000–2026	10,325,000
Andrea Berg	2002–2017	9,600,000
Elton John	1982–2004	9,550,000
Pur	1993–2017	9,525,000
Lady Gaga	2008-2025	9,050,000

=== 7 to 8.9 million records ===
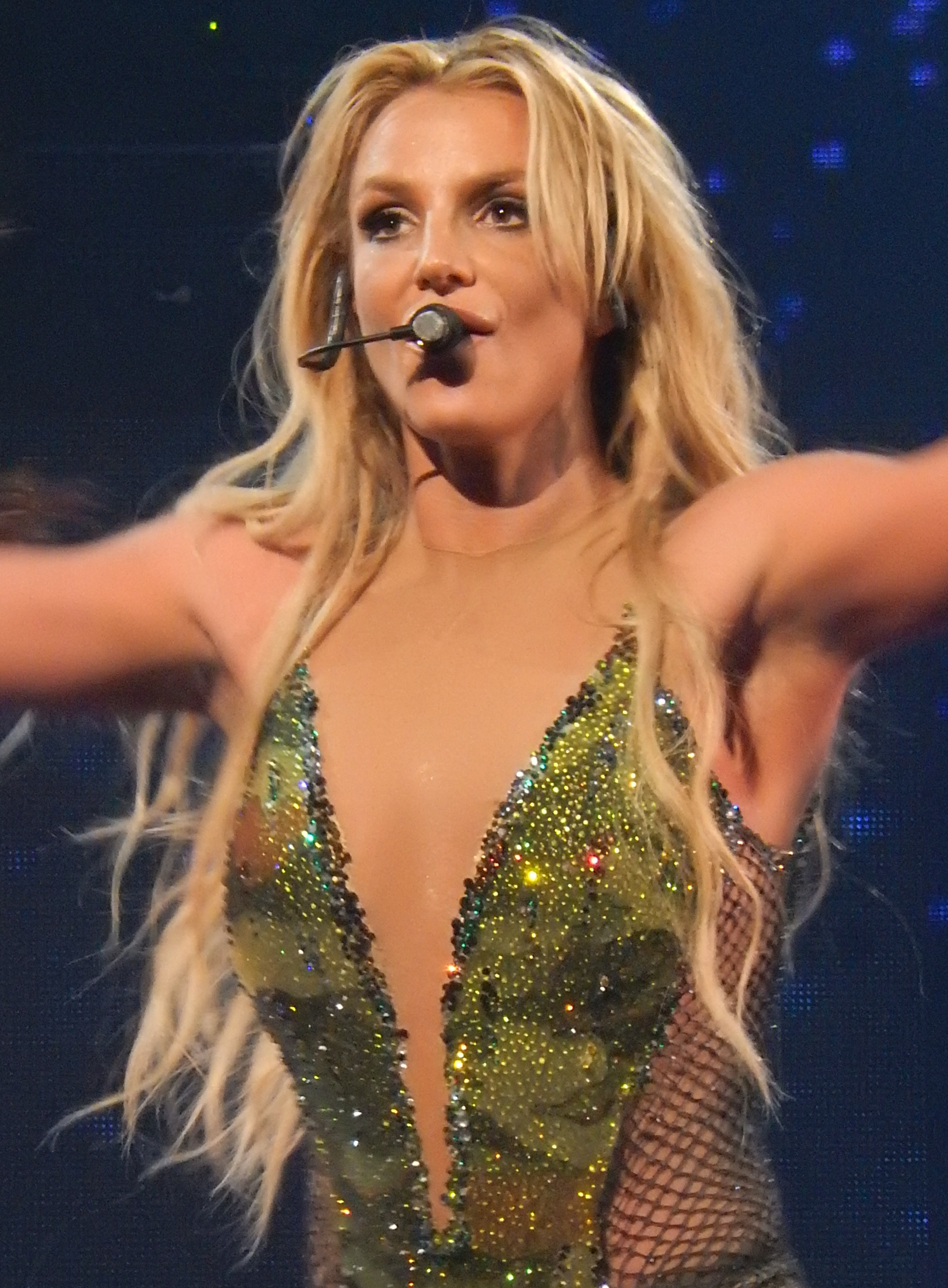
Britney Spears

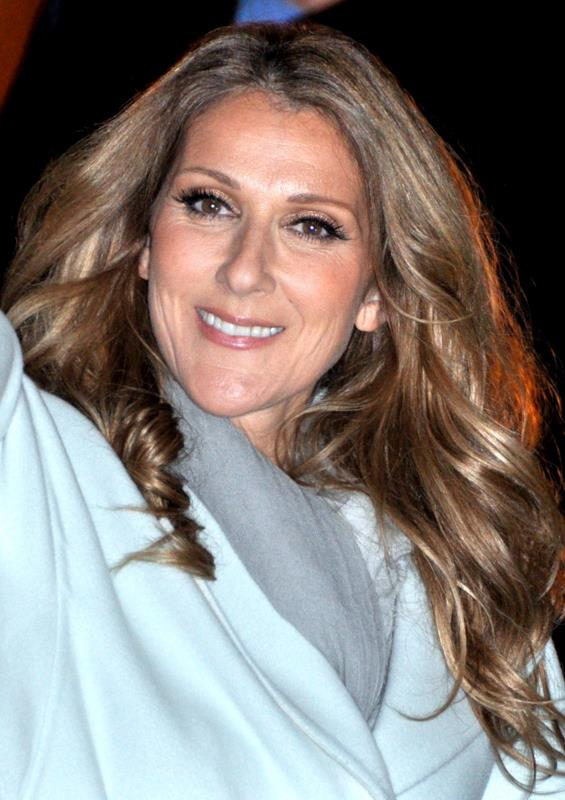
Céline Dion

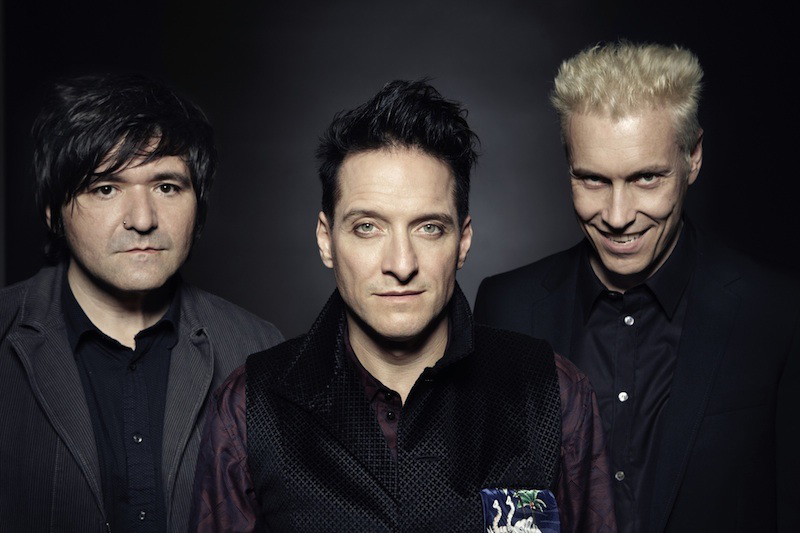
Die Ärzte

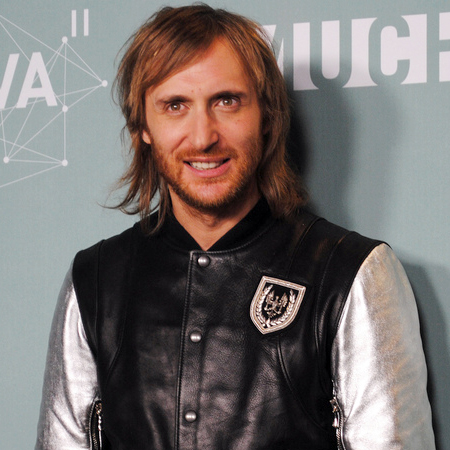
David Guetta

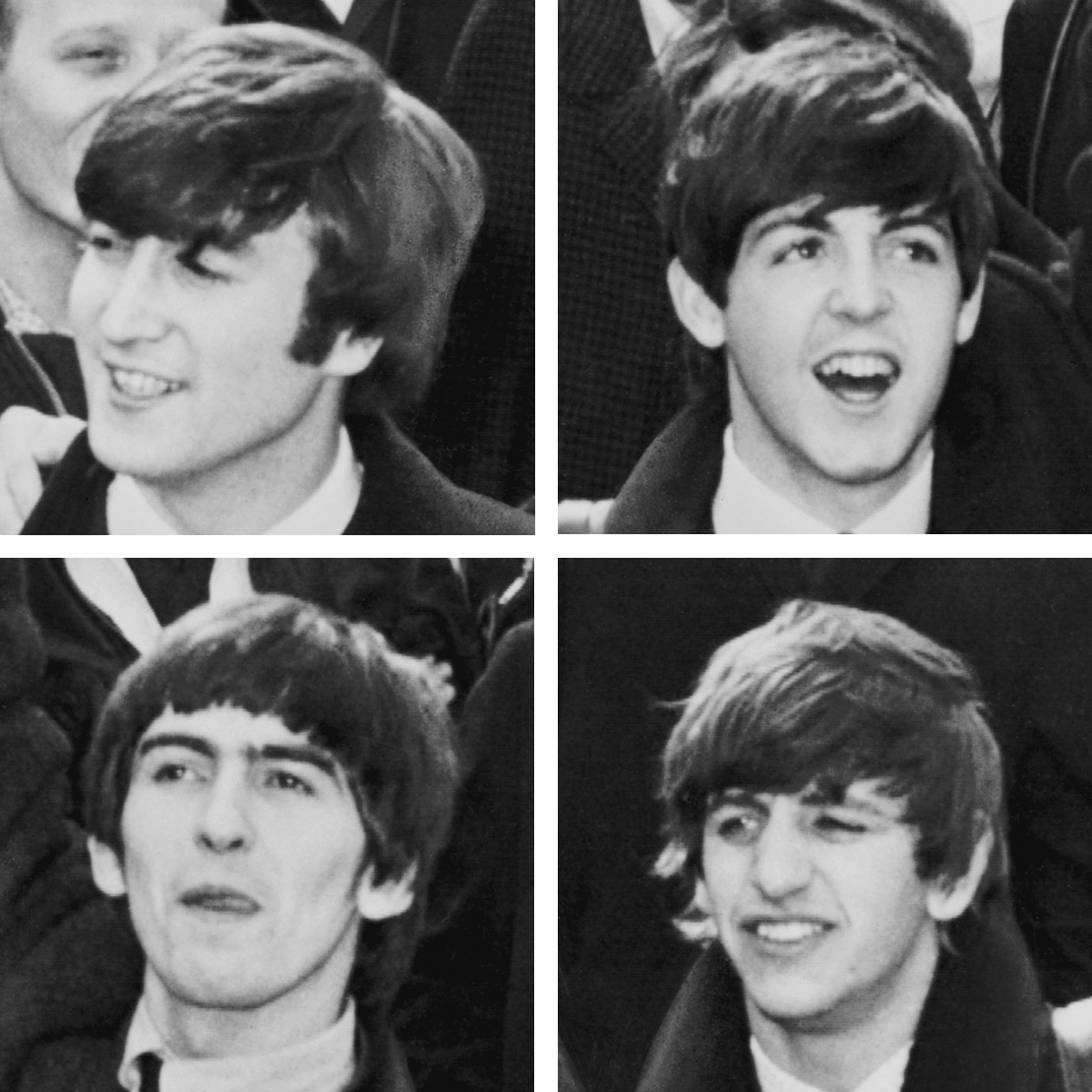
The Beatles

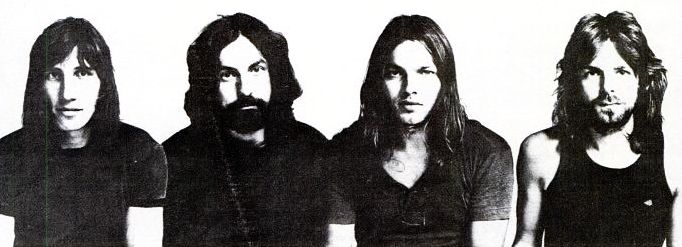
Pink Floyd

Name	Certification period	Certified units
Die Flippers	1987–2012	8,650,000
Britney Spears	1999–2023	8,200,000
Céline Dion	1996–2003	8,000,000
Die Ärzte	1988–2012	7,850,000
Wolfgang Petry	1983–2014	7,825,000
David Guetta	2010–2018	7,800,000
The Beatles	1993–2007	7,600,000
Pink Floyd	1977–2015	7,500,000
Katy Perry	2008-2026	7,050,000

=== 6 to 6.9 million records ===
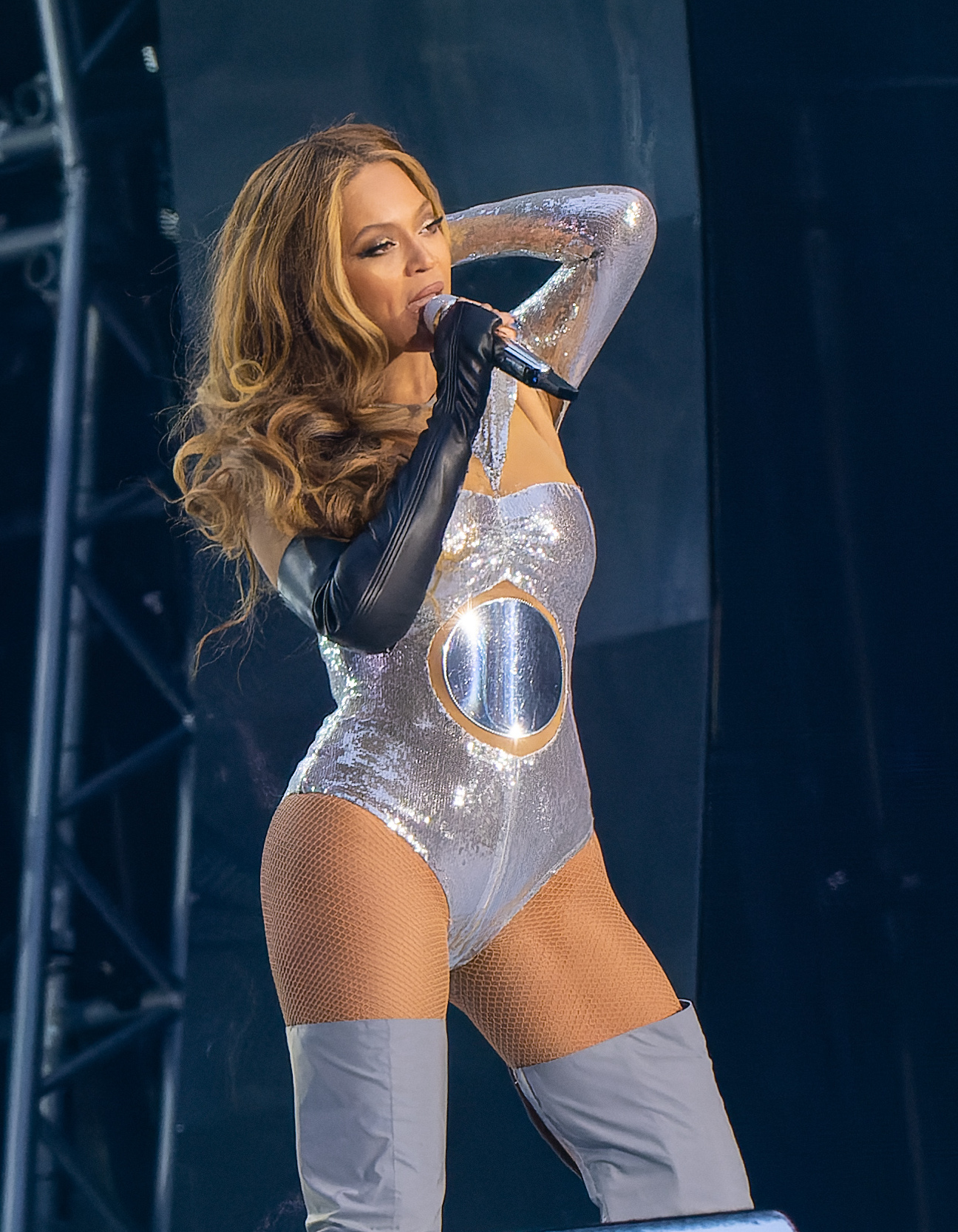
Beyoncé

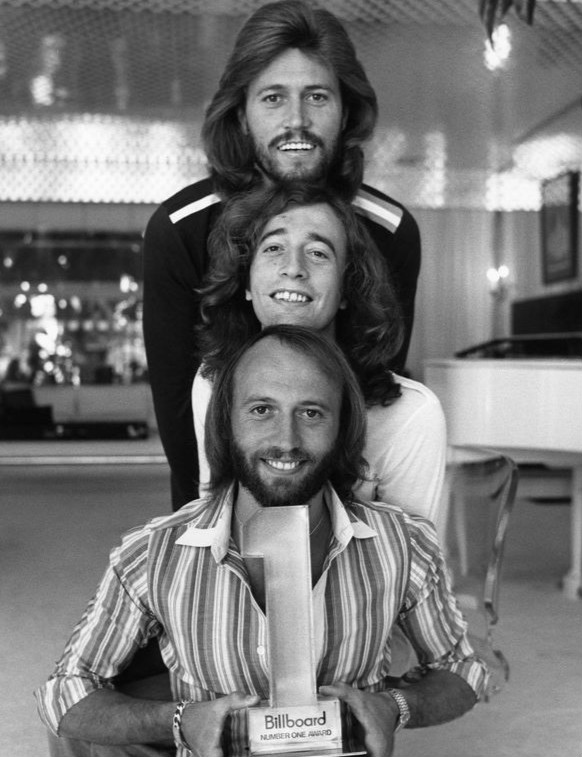
Bee Gees

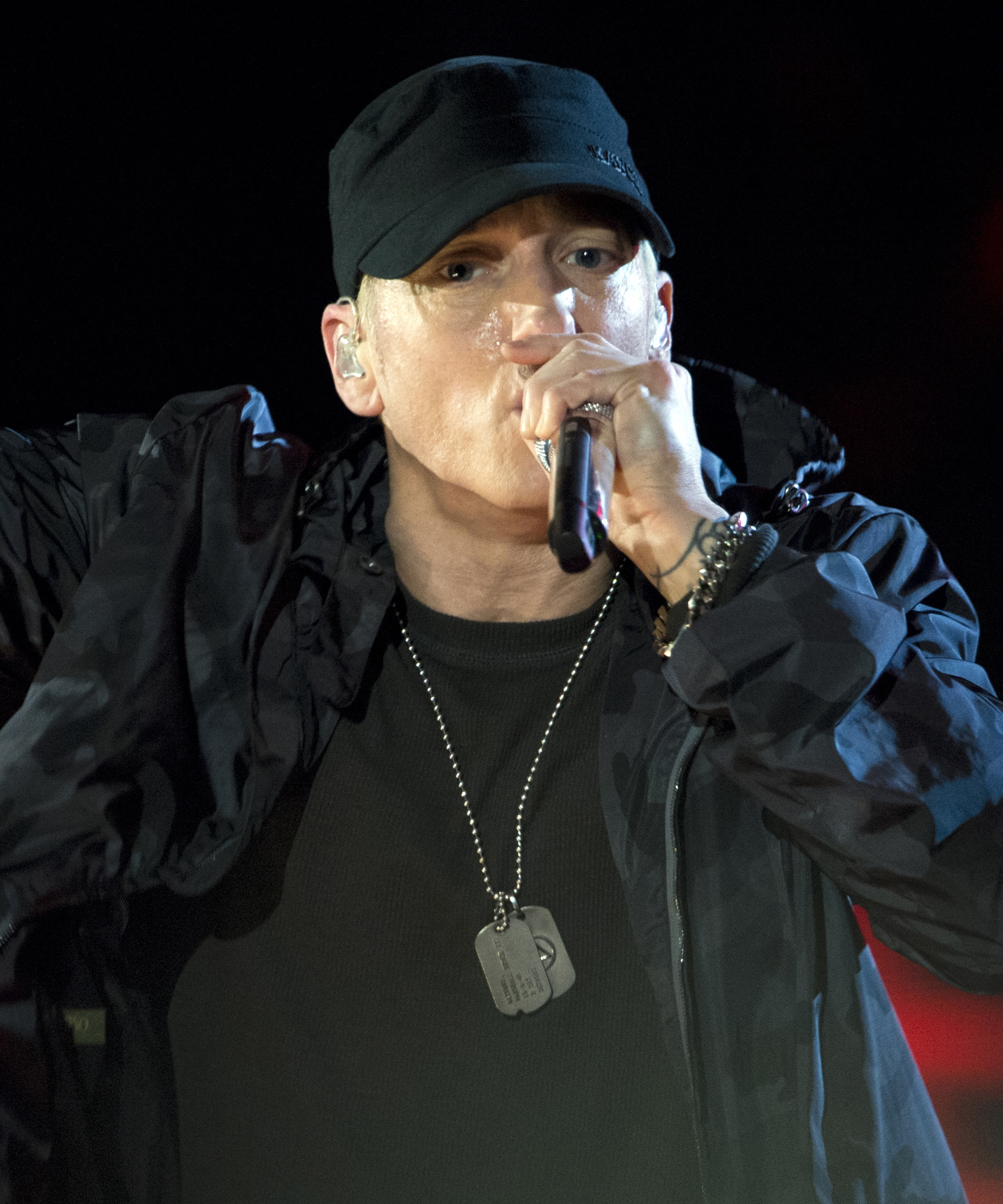
Eminem

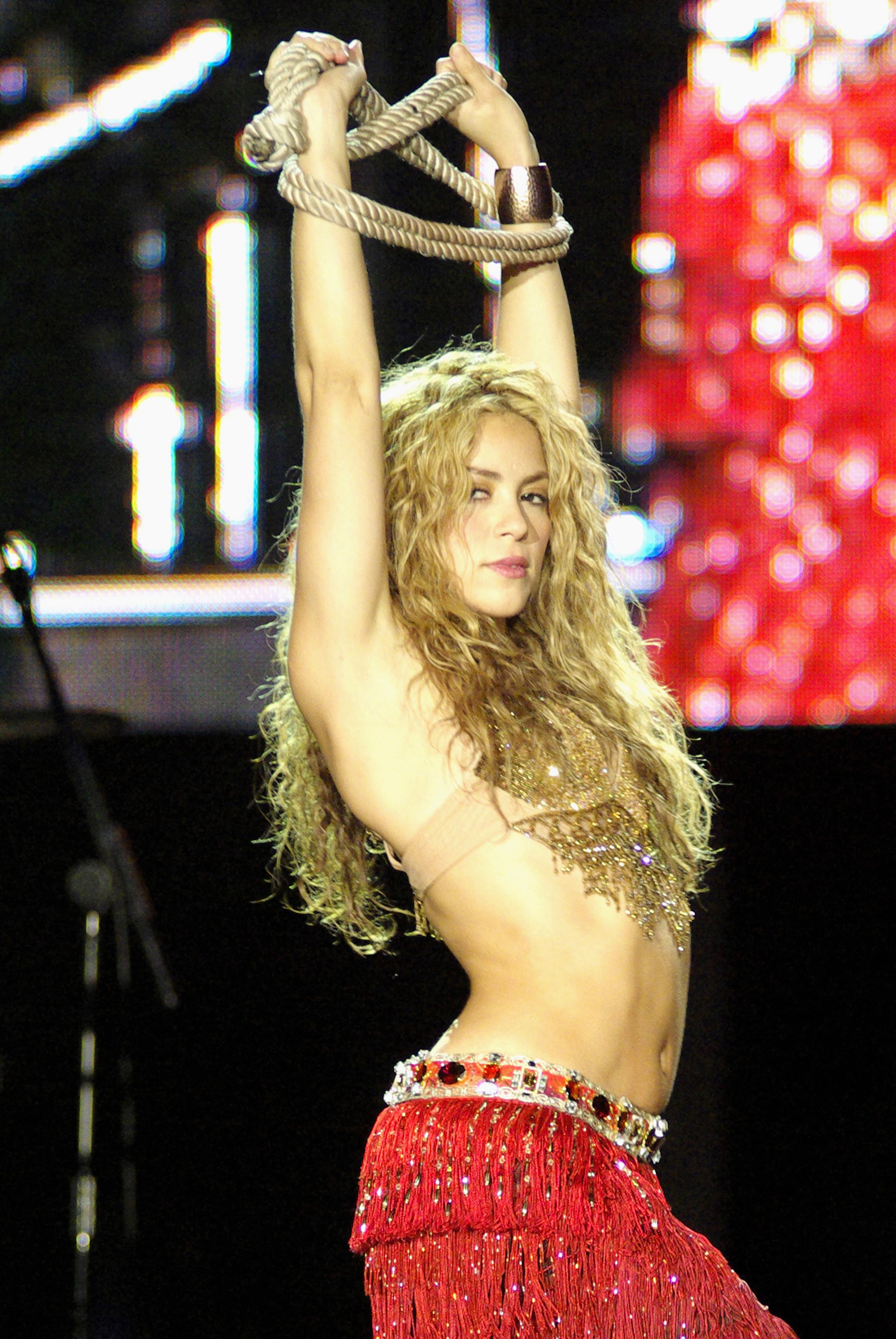
Shakira

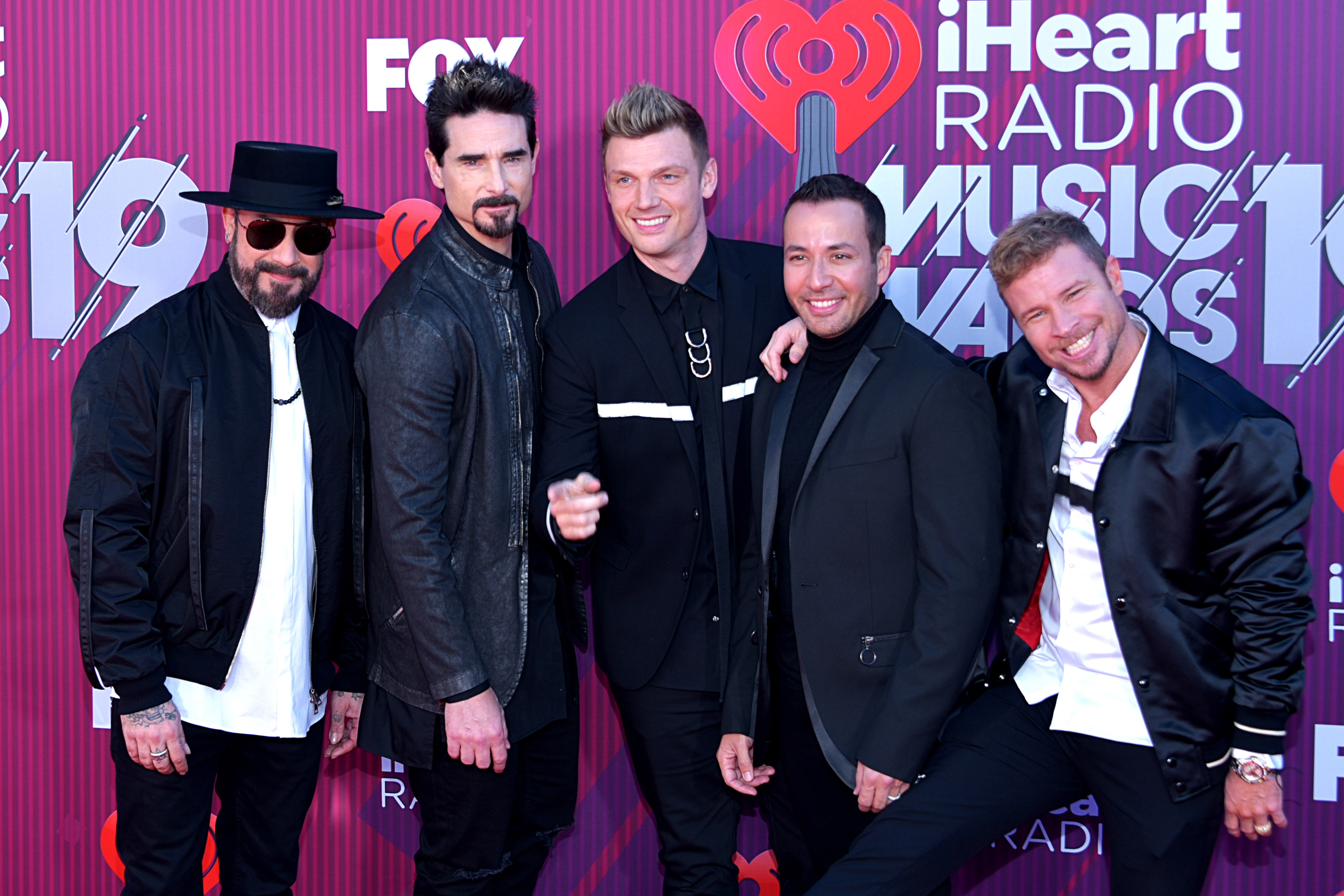
Backstreet Boys

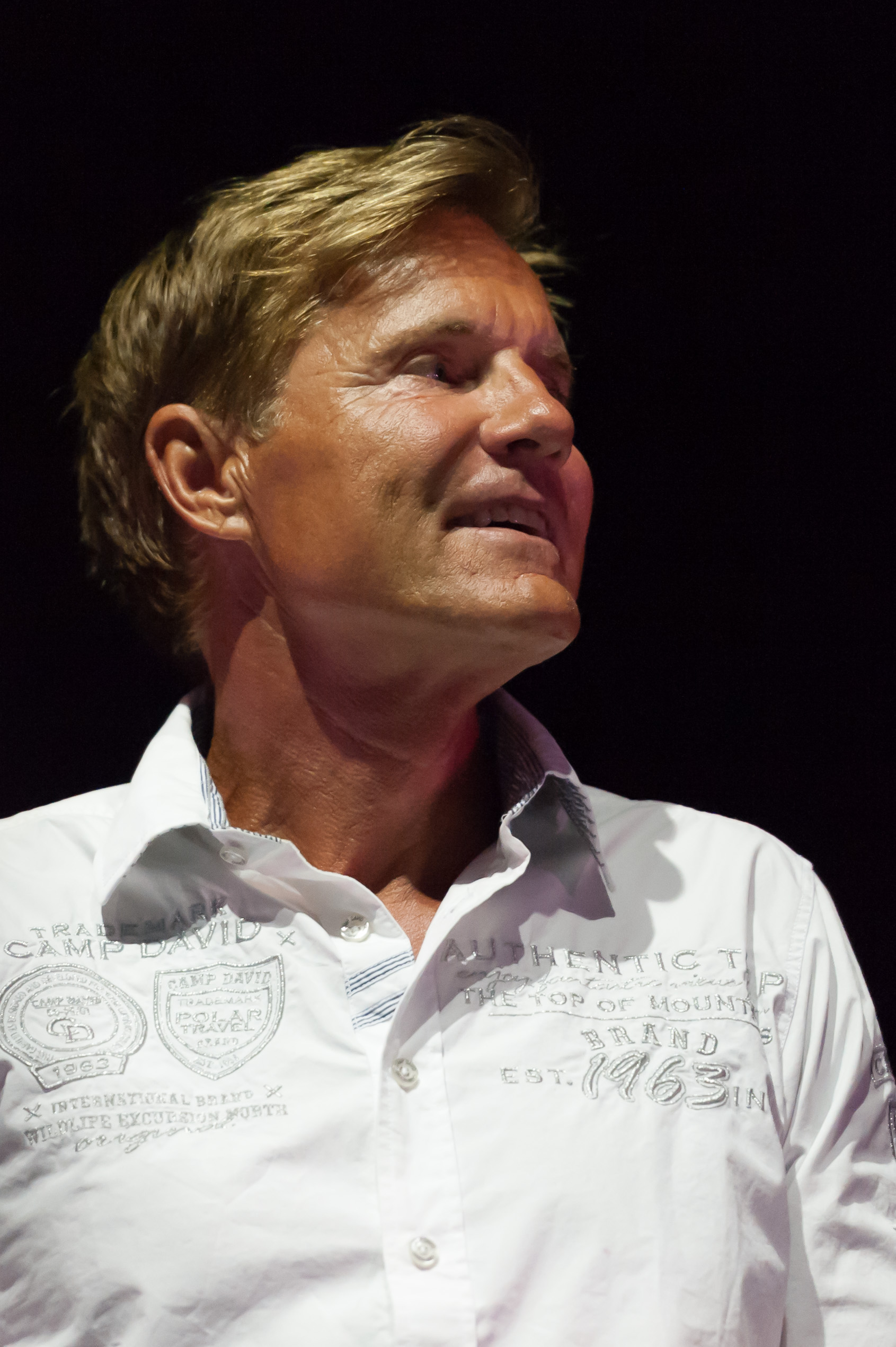
Dieter Bohlen

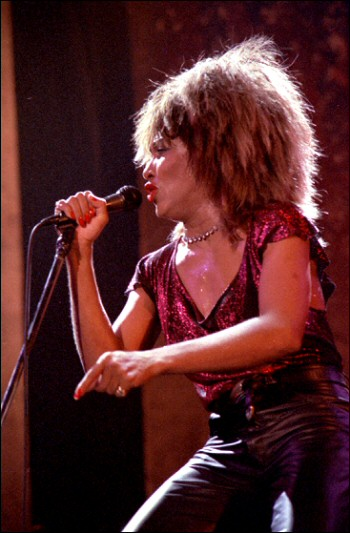
Tina Turner

Name	Certification period	Certified units
Beyoncé	2003–2025	6,800,000
Bee Gees	1978–2005	6,675,000
Eminem	2000–2018	6,625,000
Shakira	2001 - 2017	6,525,000
Backstreet Boys	1996–2003	6,500,000
Dieter Bohlen	1985–2017	6,400,000
Whitney Houston	1985–2012	6,400,000
Tina Turner	1985–2009	6,300,000
Roger Whittaker	1977–2011	6,100,000
The Kelly Family	1994–2017	6,075,000
Joe Cocker	1986–2014	6,050,000
Depeche Mode	1985–2017	6,050,000
Andrea Bocelli	1996–1999	6,000,000

=== 5 to 5.9 million records ===
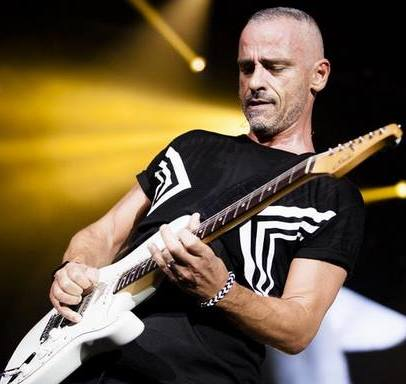
Eros Ramazzotti

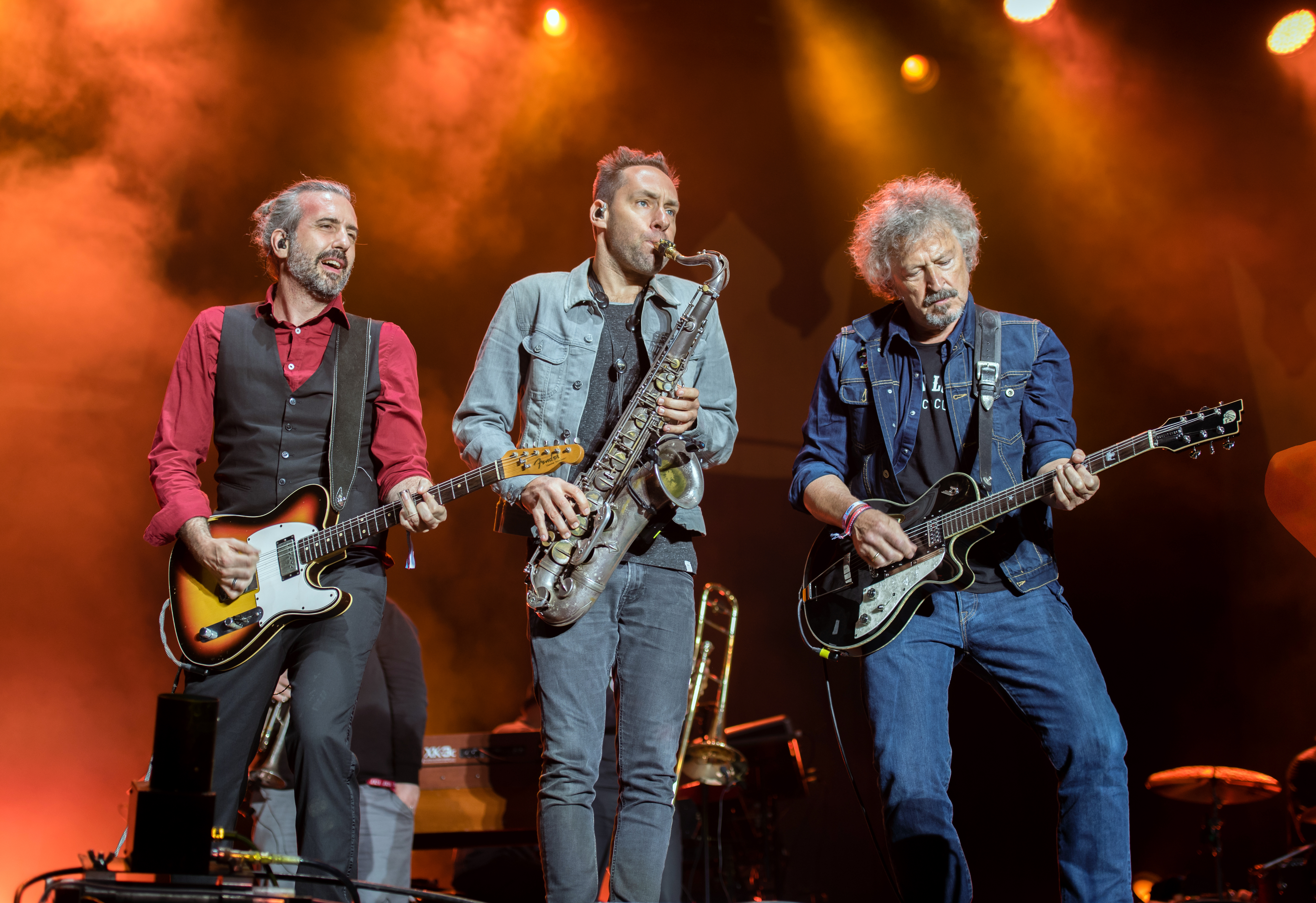
BAP

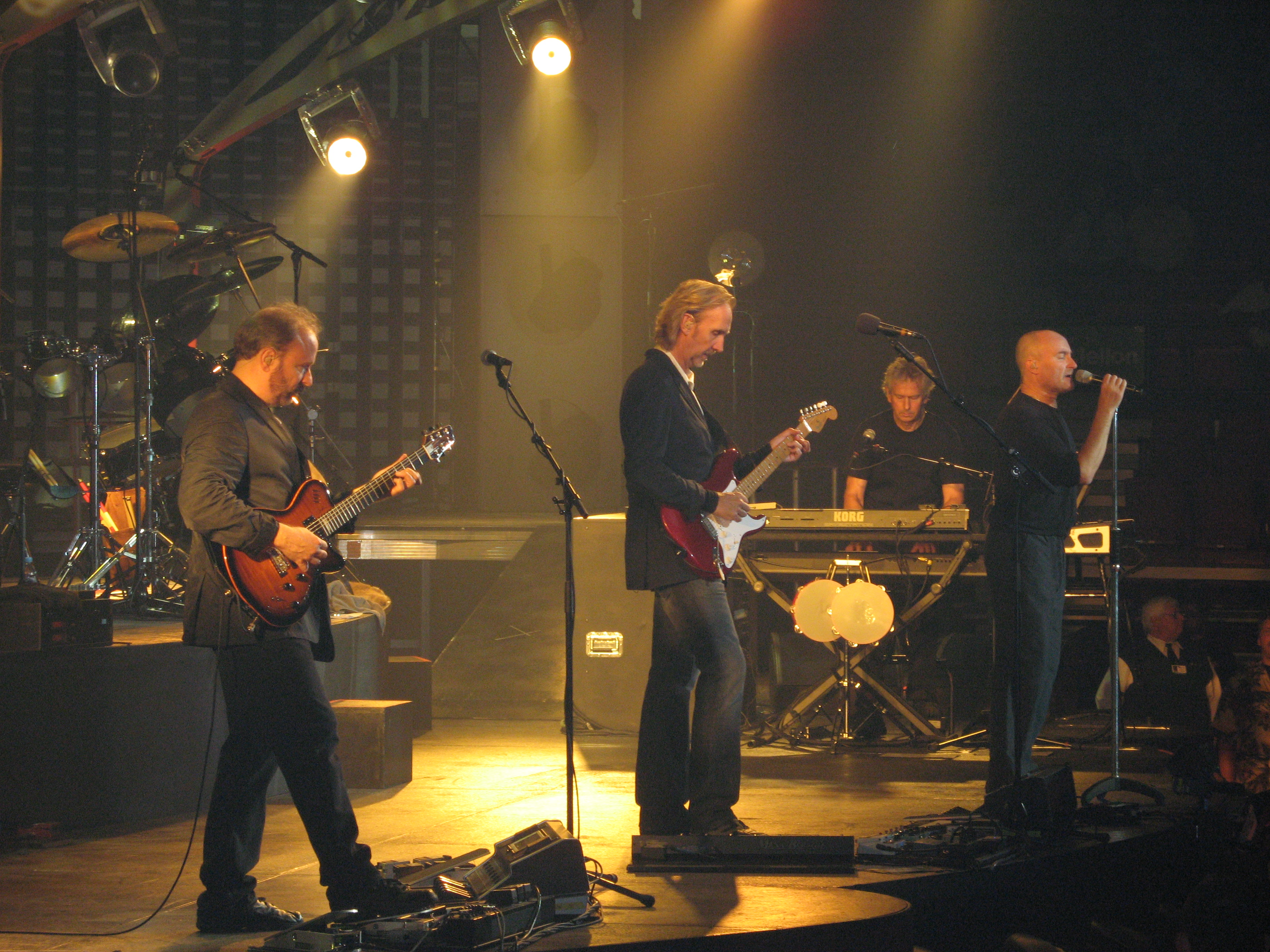
Genesis

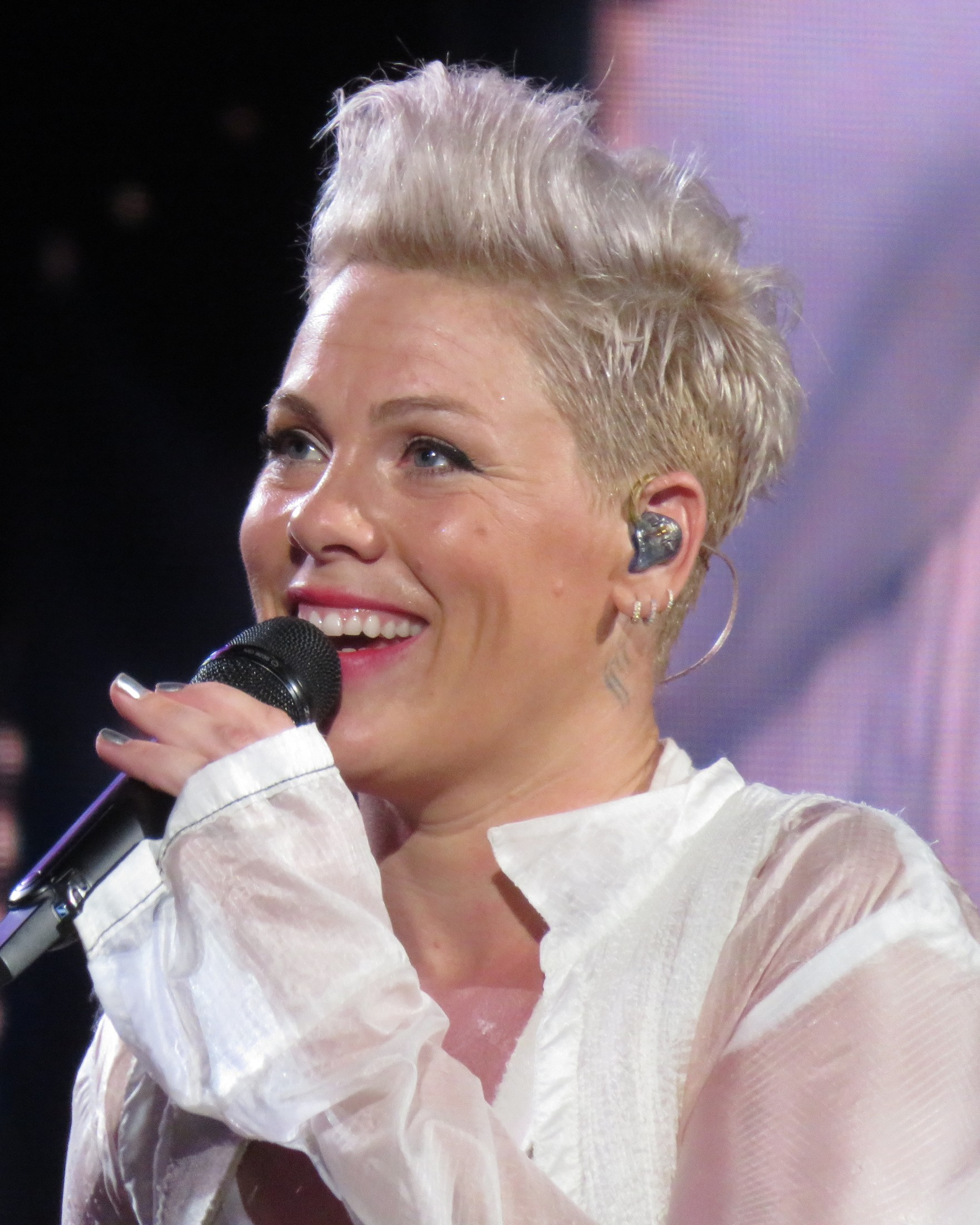
P!nk

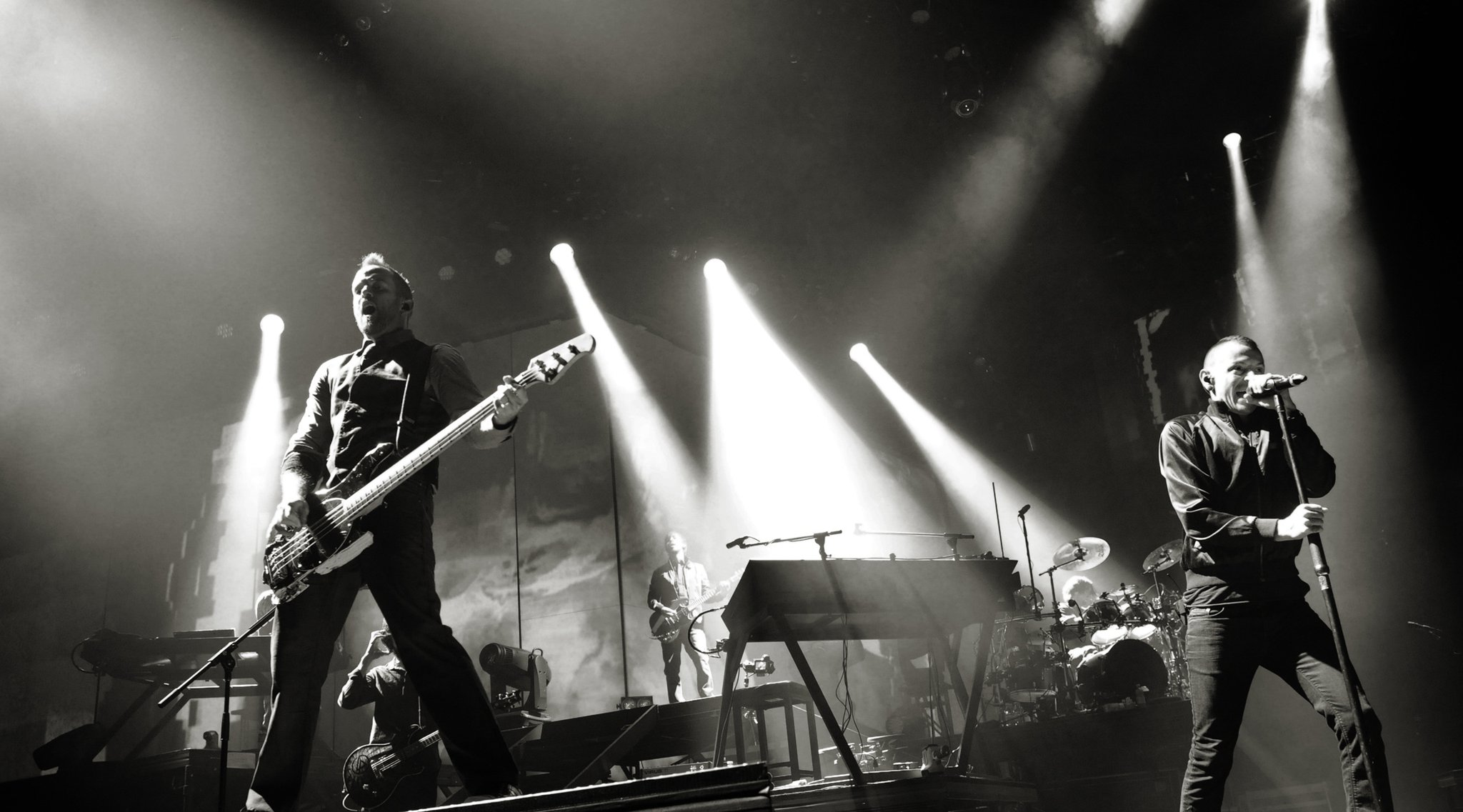
Linkin Park

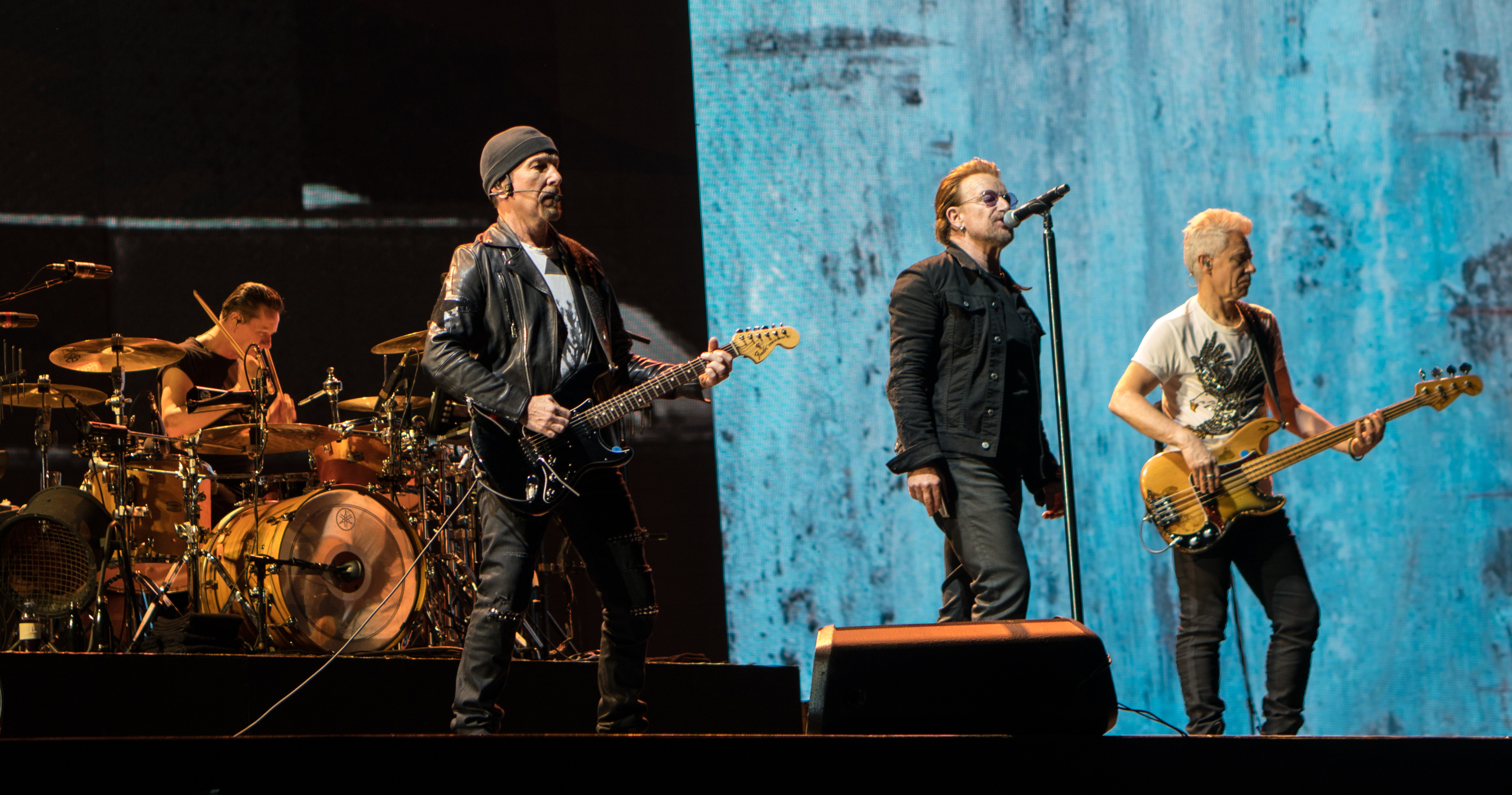
U2

Name	Certification period	Certified units
Eros Ramazzotti	1988–2013	5,950,000
BAP	1982–2013	5,900,000
Genesis	1978–2008	5,875,000
P!nk	2002–2017	5,875,000
Linkin Park	2001–2017	5,850,000
U2	1986–2018	5,700,000
Modern Talking	1985–2003	5,700,000
Xavier Naidoo	1998–2016	5,625,000
Roxette	1990–2012	5,625,000
Sting	1986–2012	5,600,000
Simply Red	1986–2013	5,350,000
James Last	1976–1999	5,250,000
Avicii	2012–2018	5,200,000
Timbaland	2000–2018	5,200,000
Unheilig	2010–2017	5,200,000
Bon Jovi	1987–2013	5,150,000

== See also ==
- List of best-selling albums in Germany
- List of best-selling singles in Germany
