= Nilam Farooq =

German actress (born 1989)

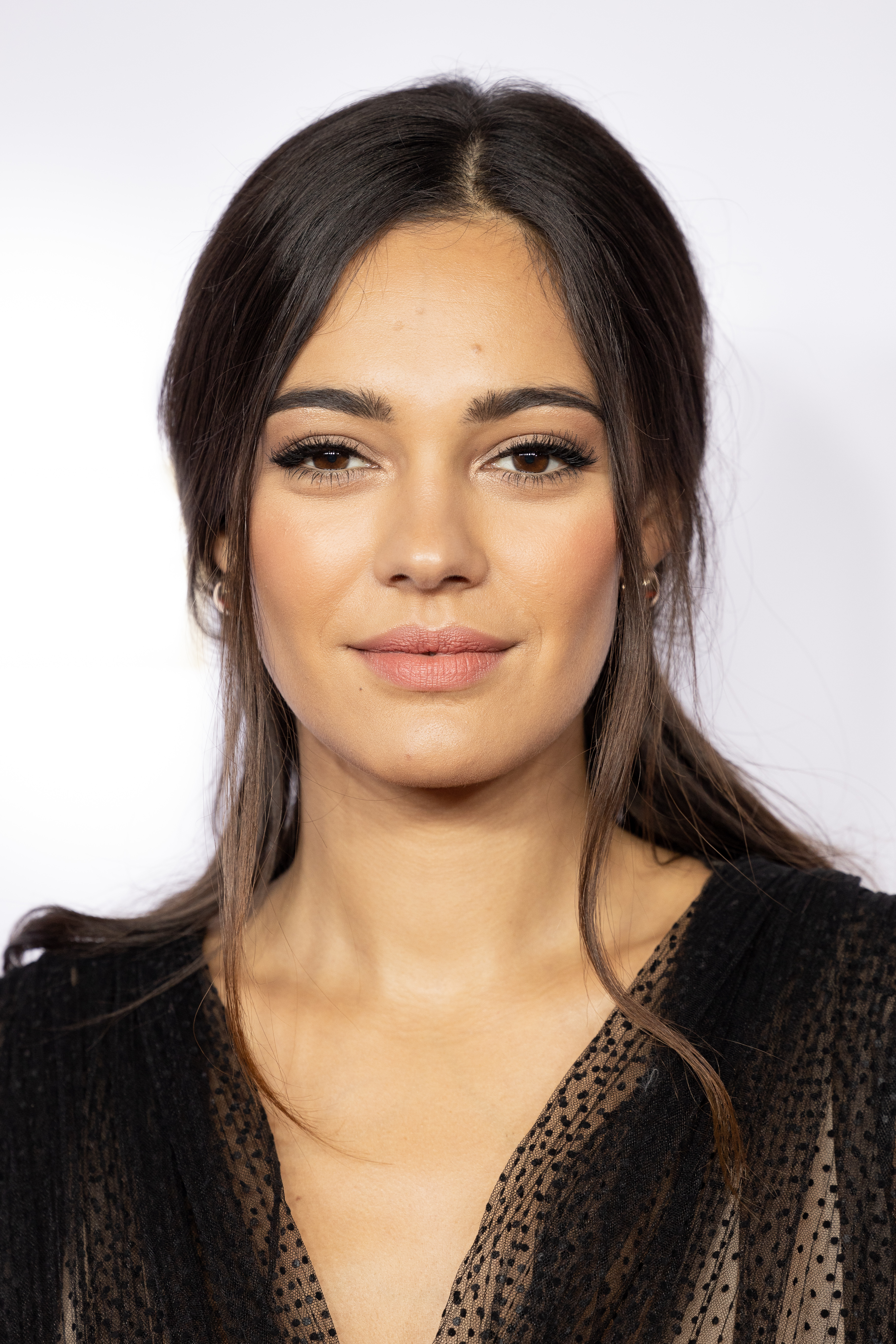
- Farooq in 2020
- Born: 26 September 1989 (age 36); West Berlin, West Germany
- Occupation: Actress

Nilam Farooq (born 26 September 1989) is a German actress. She has appeared in several television series, films, and commercials. She won the best actress Jupiter Award (2019) and the Bavarian Film Awards (2020) for movies Heilstätten and Contra.

== Biography ==
Nilam Farooq is the daughter of a Pakistani father and a Polish mother, and she has a younger brother. She was born in Berlin and grew up in the Wilmersdorf district, where she attended the local Goethe-Gymnasium and completed her Abitur. Farooq displayed an early interest in acting and began her acting career at age 14. In addition to German, she is fluent in Polish and English, and has language credentials in Latin and Ancient Greek.

In 2006 Farooq had her first guest and supporting roles as an actress on television and short films. She started appearing in commercials in the late 2000s and since the beginning of the 2010s, took some roles as a voice actress.

From 2013 to 2019 Farooq was regularly seen in the television series Leipzig Homicide as Commissioner Olivia Fareedi.

She has since played roles in various TV films and series, such as in Tatort: Roomservice and Polizeiruf 110: Grenzgänger.

Since 2015 she has had a number of feature-length film roles, including My Blind Date with Life, Sweethearts by Karoline Herfurth, the horror film Heilstätten, and David Dietl's Rate Your Date.

For her portrayal of Betty in Heilstätten, she won the 2019 Jupiter Award for Best Actress.

== Filmography ==
=== Television ===
- 2006: Alle lieben Jimmy – RTL
- 2007: Adem's Sohn – ARTE
- 2009: Stolberg – Bei Anruf Mord – ZDF
- 2009: Bella Block: Vorsehung – ZDF
- 2009: Danni Lowinski – Selbstbestimmung – Sat.1
- 2010: The Old Fox – Tödliche Ermittlung – ZDF
- 2014: Letters from Santiago – Das Erste
- 2015: Tatort – Roomservice – Das Erste
- 2015: Polizeiruf 110 – Grenzgänger – Das Erste
- 2016: NSU German History X: The Victims – Das Erste
- 2013–2019: Leipzig Homicide – from episode 229 – ZDF
- 2024: Das Signal – Netflix

=== Feature-length films ===
- 2016: Allein gegen die Zeit – Der Film
- 2017: Fette Kumpels
- 2017: My Blind Date with Life
- 2018: Heilstätten
- 2018: Verpiss dich Schneewittchen
- 2019: Rate Your Date
- 2019: Sweethearts
- 2020: Contra
- 2021: The Four of Us
- 2022: Locked-in Society
- 2023: Manta, Manta: Legacy
- 2023: Early Birds

=== Short films ===
- 2007: Stiller Frühling
- 2007: Türk Rulet
- 2008: Suzan
- 2010: Tintenfischwolken
- 2011: George 90°
- 2012: Der Passagier

=== Commercials ===
- 2009: Telekom "Grenzen gab es gestern" ("Borders are the thing of the past")
- 2012: Lebe Viva
- 2018: Wix.com

=== Voice acting ===
- 2010: Berliner Morgenpost: Kinderkram
- 2010: Upperdog – Rolle: Yanne
- 2011: Royal Pains – Rolle: Anna
- 2013: Quellen des Lebens – Rolle: Laura

== Awards ==
- 2019: Jupiter Award – Best Actress for "Heilstätten"
- 2018: nominated for Young Icons Award – Actress/Actor for "My Blind Date with Life"
- 2020: Bavarian Film Awards – Best Actress for "Contra"
