= My Blind Date with Life =

My Blind Date With Life
- Directed by: Marc Rothemund
- Written by: Oliver Ziegenbalg, Ruth Toma
- Produced by: Yoko Higuchi-Zitzmann, Tanja Ziegler, Simon J. Buchner
- Starring: Kostja Ullmann; Anna Maria Mühe
- Release date: 26 January 2017
- Running time: 111 minutes
- Country: Germany
- Language: German

My Blind Date With Life (German: Mein Blind Date mit dem Leben) is a 2017 German biographical film directed by Marc Rothemund.

== Plot ==
German-Sinhalese Saliya Kahawatte prepares for his Abitur, when he finds his eyesight progressively decreasing. After conducting an examination, his ophthalmologist tells him and his family, that the only way to retain at least a small fraction of his eyesight would be an immediate surgery. Despite doubts from his family, especially his father, and other people around him, he intends to finish the Abitur and does so, due to diligence and art of memory.

Afterwards, he wants to realise his dream of working in a hotel, but all his applications, in which he states his impaired vision, are declined. He then decides to apply for a job at the Bayrischer Hof in Munich without stating his disability, and gets the job without difficulty. He befriends Max, who also just got employed at the hotel and who is the only person whom he tells about his impaired vision. Max goes on to help Saliya to learn all the work steps and pathways, until he has fully memorised them.

At the hotel, Saliya also meets Laura, a single mother, who supplies the hotel kitchen with produce from the farm of her parents, and they gradually become closer, although he still keeps his impairment a secret from her.

At this time, his parents separate, and to support his mother financially, Saliya starts working during nighttime as a pizza baker, unbeknownst to his supervisors and colleagues at the hotel. To keep doing both jobs, he starts taking stimulants. The resulting exhaustion and altered biorhythm get him into trouble, as he oversleeps one day and arrives late for work at the hotel, whereupon he is admonished.

Meanwhile, Saliya also meets Laura's son Oskar. While being out spending time with them, he is supposed to look after Oskar alone for a while on a playground, but loses sight of him after being distracted by a phone call. Due to being near-blind, he is completely helpless in this situation, and when Laura returns, she is distraught. They are able to find Oskar again soon, but Saliya now has to tell Laura about his impaired vision, after which she leaves him, shocked and angered that he didn't tell her beforehand.

During a wedding ceremony at the hotel, the overfatigued and exhausted Saliya first drops a tray with glasses of Sekt and then even collides with the wedding cake. The newlyweds and the guests are horrified and Saliya is promptly fired. He completely loses himself, overindulging in alcohol, and ends up in hospital due to injuries sustained from a fall while being drunk. His mother and sister help him to get back on the right track again, and he soon comes back to the hotel, apologising to his former supervisors and asking them for a chance to participate in the graduation exam. Surprisingly, his supervisors give him the chance and he passes the exam successfully. He finishes his work at the hotel and opens his own venue together with Max. Laura, who has by now forgiven Saliya, also takes part in the opening ceremony and goes on to help them from now on.

== Cast ==
- Kostja Ullmann - Saliya Kahawatte
- Anna Maria Mühe - Laura
- Ludger Pistor - Lehrer Döngen
- Nilam Farooq - Sheela
- Herbert Forthuber - Herr Kolditz
- Kida Khodr Ramadan - Hamid
- Johann von Bülow - Kleinschmidt
- Jacob Matschenz - Max
- Uwe Preuss - Augenarzt
- Olivia Marei - Tina
- Alexander Held - Fried
- Rainer Reiners - Deutschlehrer
- Michael A. Grimm - Küchenchef Krohn
- Samira El Ouassil - Jala Asgari
