= Janina Elkin =

German actress (born 1982)

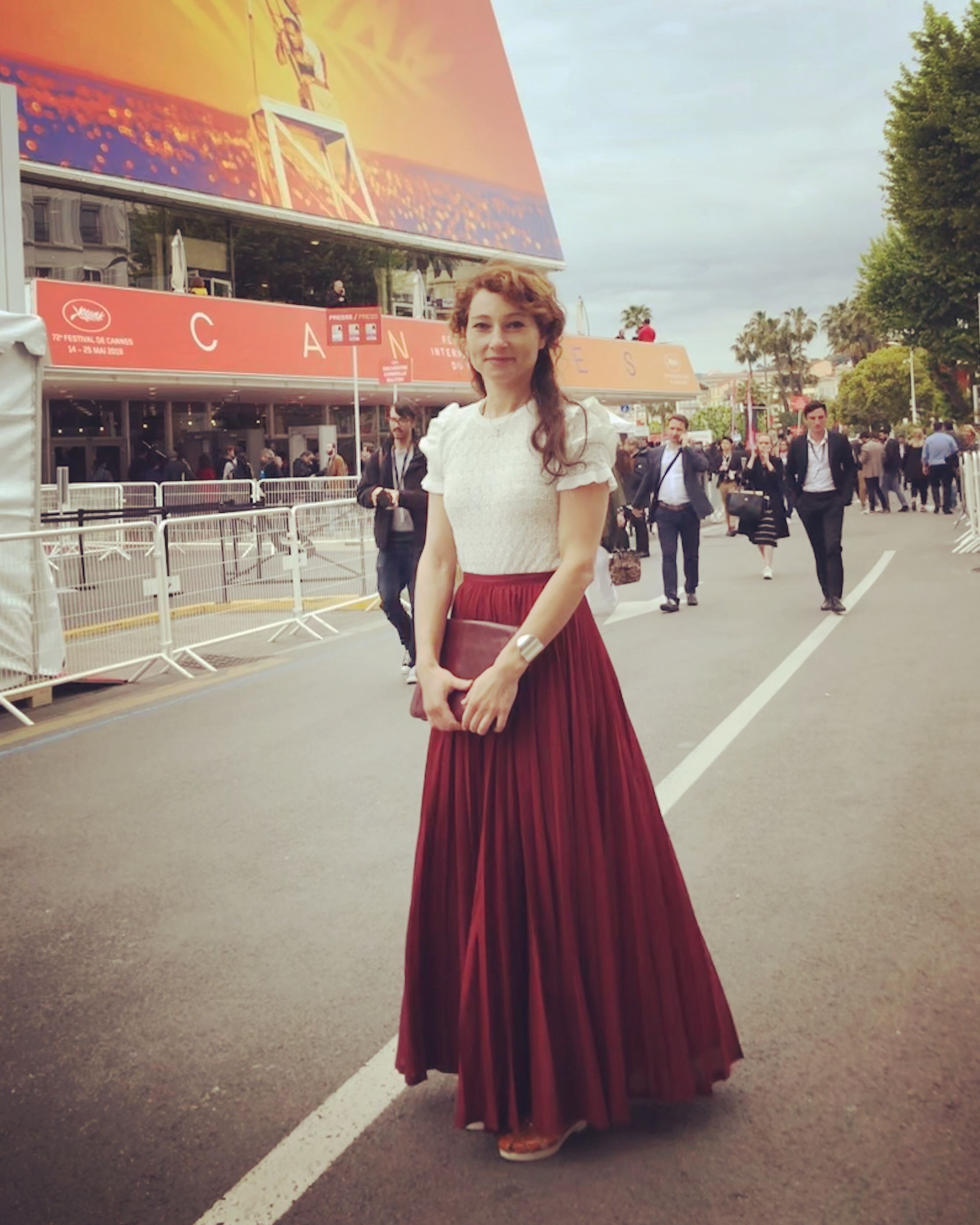
- Janina Elkin in Cannes 2019
- Born: Janina Elkin; 20 December 1982 (age 43); Kyiv, Ukrainian Soviet Republic
- Occupation: Actress
- Years active: 2003-present

Janina Elkin (born 20 December 1982 in Kyiv, Ukrainian Soviet Republic) is a German film and theater actress.

== Background ==
Janina Elkin was born on 20 December 1982 in Kyiv, Ukrainian SSR. She attended the State Dance Academy in Kiev. At the age of 10, she moved with her family to Heidelberg, Germany. She attended the State Ballet Academy in Mannheim, where she trained as a ballet dancer. With a scholarship, she studied acting at the Lee Strasberg Theatre and Film Institute in New York City from 2001 to 2004. Since 2004 she has been working as an actress on stage as well as in film and television. From 2009 to 2010 she played the role of Baby in the musical Dirty Dancing in Berlin. Elkin played her first major leading role in the feature film Bela Kiss: Prologue, released in Germany in January 2013.
She became internationally known with her role in the Netflix miniseries The Queen's Gambit.

== Filmography ==
- 2003: Küssen verboten, Baggern erlaubt
- 2004: Tumbling Leaf – Ein Tag im Herbst
- 2005: Frauenhelden – Machos in der Sackgasse
- 2005: Stubbe – Von Fall zu Fall: Harte Kerle
- 2005: Lorenz
- 2005: Schmetterlingseffekt
- 2006: Storm Tide
- 2006: Das Duo: Unter Strom
- 2009: SOKO 5113: Tote kuscheln nicht
- 2009: Scissu
- 2010: Wie Blumen
- 2010: Not Afraid
- 2010: 1000 Gramm
- 2011: Schloss Einstein
- 2012: Stille Nacht
- 2012: Die Welt nebenan
- 2012: Lady Europa
- 2013: Bela Kiss: Prologue
- 2013: In aller Freundschaft: Zeit für Veränderungen
- 2013: Der Landarzt: Erstickungsangst
- 2013: Global Player
- 2014: Vivre à Berlin
- 2014: Contese
- 2015: Fremdkörper
- 2015: Frühling zu zweit
- 2015: Noah
- 2015: SOKO Stuttgart: Masken
- 2015: Service
- 2016: Ente Gut! Mädchen allein zu Haus
- 2016: Tod auf Raten (Short Term Memory Loss)
- 2016: Ostfriesisch für Anfänger
- 2016: SOKO Leipzig: Tod eines Kollegen
- 2016–2018: Schloß Webstein
- 2017: Notruf Hafenkante: Abnabelung
- 2017: Vollmond
- 2017: Die andere Welt
- 2018: Der Besuch
- 2019: In aller Freundschaft – Die jungen Ärzte: Schwindel
- 2019: Matula – Tod auf Mallorca
- 2019: Darkroom – Tödliche Tropfen
- 2019: Tatort: Die harte Kern
- 2019: Lovers
- 2020: The Queen's Gambit
- 2021: Tatort: Was wir erben
- 2021: WaPo Lake Constance
