= Küss mich wach =

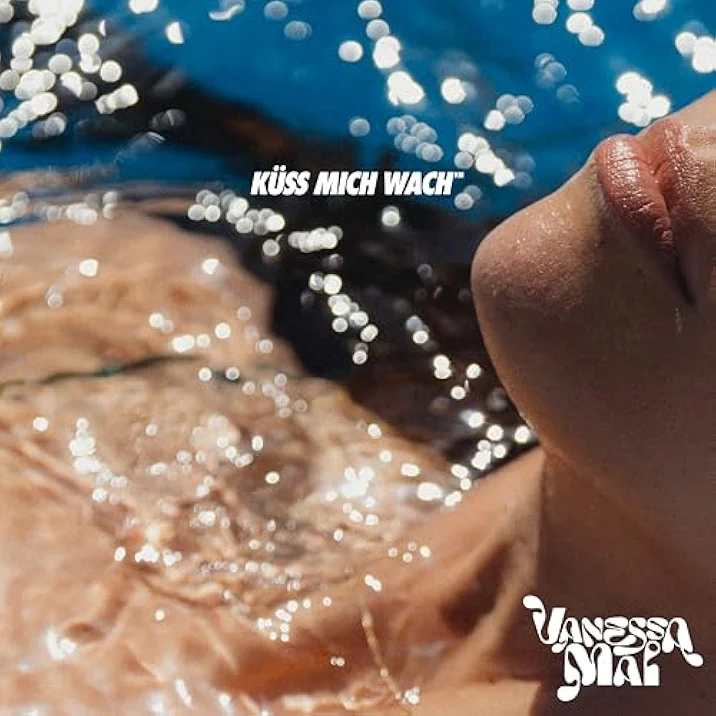

Single by Vanessa Mai

from the album Traumfabrik
- Language: German
- English title: Kiss me awake
- Released: 19 September 2025
- Genre: Pop, Schlager
- Label: Warner Music Group
- Songwriters: Christoph Cronauer, Vanessa Mai, Matthias Zürkler
- Producers: Christoph Cronauer, Matthias Zürkler

"Küss mich wach" (lit. 'Kiss me awake') is a song by German pop and Schlager singer Vanessa Mai, released on 19 September 2025. The track is the eighth single released from her eleventh studio album, "Traumfabrik".

== Origin and artwork ==
The song was written by Vanessa Mai herself, together with co-writers Matthias Zürkler (B-Case) and brothers Chris and Daniel Cronauer. The latter two were also responsible for the production. Mastering was completed by the team at Mixcube Studio in Austria.

Vanessa Mai returned to her former songwriters and producers B-Case, Christoph Cronauer, and Daniel Cronauer for the production of her new album, following the release of two albums in the interim. All three previously worked with her between 2019 and 2022, often in joint roles. This collaboration resulted in the albums Für immer (January 2020), Mai Tai (March 2021), and Metamorphose (August 2022), which featured several singles, including the chart hit Melatonin (February 2022) and the earlier singles Himbeerrot (One Kiss) (September 2024), Lobby (November 2024), Von London nach New York (January 2025), Sorry Sorry (April 2025), 100% verliebt (June 2025) and Für mich bist du Liebe (August 2025).

The front cover of the single features Vanessa Mai, along with the song title and artist information. It shows only a close-up of her cleavage, down to just below her nose, as she lies in the water. The photograph was taken during a photoshoot in which Mai wore a green, rhinestone-studded swimsuit. This attracted media attention, including from Focus Online and TV Spielfilm. The photograph is by Leipzig-based photographer Sandra Ludewig, who has previously done several photoshoots with Mai; and was taken during the filming of the music video for the single "Sorry Sorry" in Spain, in which the swimsuit also makes a brief appearance.

== Publication and promotion ==
The first release of "Küss mich wach" was as a single on 19 September 2025. It was released as a digital single track for download and streaming by Warner Music. Warner Music was also responsible for distribution, while the song was published by AFM Publishing, Budde Music Publishing, Edition Djorkaeff Beatzarre, Edition Teamscore, Edition Vanessa Mai and Fisherman Songs. On 10 October 2025, the song was released as part of Mai's eleventh studio album, Traumfabrik (catalog number: 502173283272), and it is the eighth and final single from the album.

The release of "Küss mich wach" was first announced on 14 September 2025, when Mai herself confirmed it via her social media with the comment: "Küss mich wach is coming next Friday." The post was accompanied by a teaser of the song's chorus. An official music video was not filmed, but a lyric video was released on the day of the single's release.

== Composition ==
Da sind tausend Sterne in mei’m Bauch. Küss mich wach, komm, weck mich auf. Spür’ dieses Kribbeln auf der Haut. Küss mich wach, komm, weck mich auf. Ein Gefühl, ich glaub’, es hält ewig an. Sag, wo warst du bloß mein Leben lang? Wir dreh’n alles auf laut. Küss mich wach, komm, weck mich auf. — Refrain, original excerpt	The lyrics of "Küss mich wach" are in German and were written by the performer herself, as well as B-Case and Christoph Cronauer. All the lyricists also composed the music in the key of B-flat major with a tempo of 133 beats per minute. Musically, the song falls within the realms of pop music and Schlager music stylistically within the pop-Schlager genre, with the use of Autotune. The song "Küss mich wach" (Kiss Me Awake) is a love song that describes that one moment that can change everything. The song tells of that magical moment ("And I realize that happiness can be described so easily […] Where have you been all my life?") when a glance ("I see you and you see me") or a smile is able to change everything ("You smile at me out of nowhere"). The lyrics perfectly capture this tingling feeling ("Feel this tingling on my skin"), when a "hello" can suddenly become a "forever?" ("A feeling, I think it will last forever").

The song is structured with two verses, a chorus, and an outro. It begins with the first verse, which is written as an eight-line verse. This is followed by a three-line pre-chorus before the actual chorus begins. The chorus also consists of eight lines, but the first time it is performed, it is presented in an extended version in which the first four lines are repeated. The same structure is repeated with the second verse. After the second chorus, which is performed in its regular form, the song ends with the outro. This comprises four lines, consisting of a repeating couplet; and includes, among other things, the final line of the chorus as well as a preceding "Oh-oh-oh, oh-oh-oh-oh".

== Contributors ==
Song production: Christoph Cronauer: Composition, lyrics, music production; Daniel Cronauer: Composition, Lyrics; Vanessa Mai: vocals, composition, lyrics; Mixcube Studio: Mastering; Matthias Zürkler (B-Case): Mixing, composition, lyrics, music production; Visualization: Sandra Ludewig: Photographer	Production: AFM Publishing: Music Publisher; Budde Music Publishing: Music Publisher; Edition Djorkaeff Beatzarre: music publisher; Edition Teamscore: Music Publisher; Edition Vanessa Mai: Music Publisher; Fisherman Songs: Music Publisher; Warner Music Group: Music label, distribution

== Reception ==
Andreas Breitkopf of the German-language online magazine Hitbarometer described "Küss mich wach" (Kiss Me Awake) as a track with driving beats, sparkling production, and intense emotion—absolutely fitting for the versatile singer. Vanessa Mai relies on modern sounds that make both longing and new beginnings palpable. The song draws you straight to the dance floor, like a sunrise after a long night: intense, electrifying, and full of possibilities. After the ballad "Für mich bist du Liebe" (For Me You Are Love) , Mai now takes a more danceable direction, creating a track with pulsating beats and her unmistakable voice that moves both heart and body; a final musical glimpse before the dream factory opens its door.

Philipp Kause of laut.de gave the album Traumfabrik two out of five stars. During his review, he concluded that Mai's use of Auto-Tune was unsuccessful several times on the album, including in Küss mich wach and Von London nach New York.

== Chart positions ==
Kiss Me Awake failed to enter the singles charts, but reached number 32 on the weekly German Conservative Pop Airplay chart on 14 November 2025.
