= Für mich bist du Liebe =

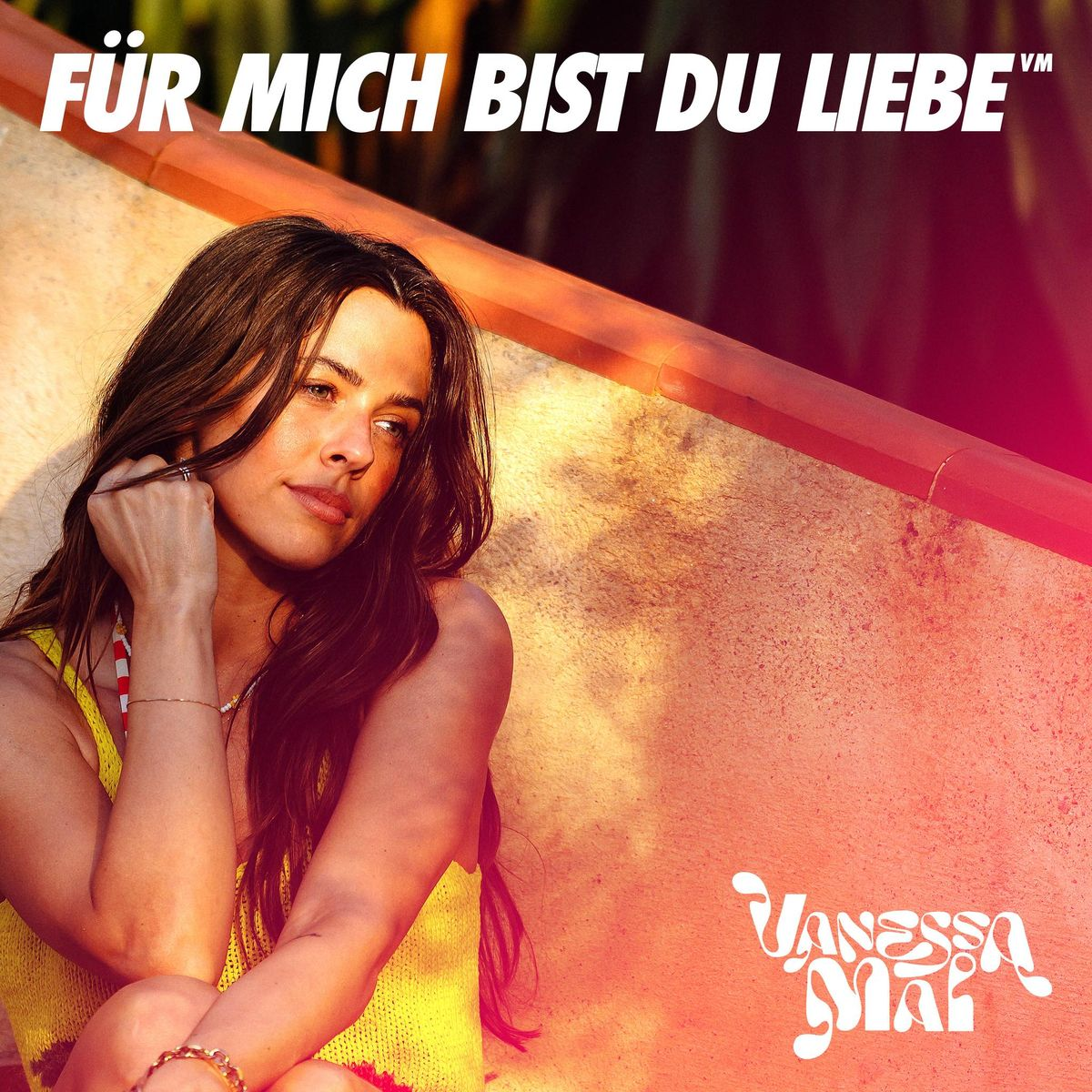

Single by Vanessa Mai

from the album Traumfabrik
- Language: German
- English title: For Me You Are Love
- Released: 22 August 2025
- Genre: Pop, Schlager
- Length: 3:17
- Songwriters: Christoph Cronauer, Daniel Cronauer, Vanessa Mai, Matthias Zürkler
- Producers: Christoph Cronauer, Matthias Zürkler

"Für mich bist du Liebe" (lit. 'For Me You Are Love') is a song by German pop and Schlager singer Vanessa Mai, released on 22 August 2025. The track is the seventh single released from her eleventh studio album, "Traumfabrik".

== Origin and artwork ==
The song was written by Vanessa Mai herself, together with co-writers Matthias Zürkler (B-Case) and brothers Chris and Daniel Cronauer. B-Case and Christoph Cronauer also jointly produced the song. Mastering was completed by the team at Mixcube Studio in Austria.

Vanessa Mai returned to her former songwriters and producers B-Case, Christoph Cronauer, and Daniel Cronauer for the production of her new album, following the release of two albums in the interim. All three previously worked with her between 2019 and 2022, often in joint roles. This collaboration resulted in the albums Für immer (January 2020), Mai Tai (March 2021), and Metamorphose (August 2022), which featured several singles, including the chart hit Melatonin (February 2022) and the earlier singles Himbeerrot (One Kiss) (September 2024), Lobby (November 2024), Von London nach New York (January 2025), Sorry Sorry (April 2025), and 100% verliebt (June 2025.

The front cover of the single features Vanessa Mai, along with the song title and artist information. She is sitting on the floor with her legs bent, leaning against a wall, wearing a yellow top. Her right arm is resting on her knee, her right fist touching her cheek, and her gaze is directed forward, but not at the camera. The photograph is by Leipzig-based photographer Sandra Ludewig, who has previously done several photoshoots with Mai; and was taken during the filming of the music video for the single "Sorry Sorry" in Spain.

== Publication and promotion ==
The first release of "Für mich bist du Liebe" was as a single on 22 August 2025. It was released as a digital single track for download and streaming by Warner Music. Warner Music also handled distribution; while the song was published by AFM Publishing, Budde Music Publishing, Edition Djorkaeff Beatzarre, Edition Teamscore, Edition Vanessa Mai and Fisherman Songs. On 10 October 2025 of the same year, the song was released as the seventh single from Vanessa Mai's eleventh studio album, Traumfabrik (catalog number: 502173283272).

The creation of "Für mich bist du Liebe" was first revealed in early summer 2025, when Vanessa Mai performed the song acoustically at her concerts, including one on July 11 at the Mercedes-Benz Museum in Stuttgart. The single release was announced just two days before its release, when Mai and Amazon Music shared the single on their social media channels. The post was accompanied by a teaser of the song's chorus. An official music video was not filmed, but a lyric video was released on the day of the single's release.

== Composition ==
| Ja, für mich bist du Liebe. Bis zu mei’m letzten Atemzug. Für mich bist du Frieden. Und nein, ich kriege nie genug von dir. Wir geh’n diеsen Weg zu zweit. Ich wеiß, du wirst immer bei mir sein. Ja, für mich bist du Liebe. Bis zu mei’m letzten Atemzug, yeah. — Refrain, original excerpt | The lyrics of "Für mich bist du Liebe" are written in German and were written by the performer herself, as well as B-Case and the brothers Christoph and Daniel Cronauer. All the lyricists also composed the music in the key of G minor with 102 beats per minute. Musically, the song falls within the realms of pop music and Schlager music, stylistically within the pop-Schlager genre. Thematically, "Für mich bist du Liebe" (For Me You Are Love) is a love song ("Yes, for me you are love") about reliability ("You can say what you want, because my heart follows you blindly") and closeness ("You are never far away") that remains even when everything else falters ("I know you will always be with me"). Mai herself described every word in the song as "simply true" and said it was very funny what happens when songs are released. She naturally has a connection to the songs, but when they are released, something completely different happens with them. The singer is very curious to see for whom her fans listen to the song or what they feel. She further stated that the song doesn't have to be directed only at one's partner or any one person, but that anyone can connect anything that is important to them with it. |

The song is structured with two verses, a chorus, a bridge, and an outro. It begins with the first verse, which is written as a four-line verse. This is followed by the three-line pre-chorus, before the actual chorus begins with its eight lines. The same structure is repeated with the second verse. The second chorus is followed, as a musical interlude, by the four-line bridge, before the song ends with the outro. This also consists of four lines and refers back to lines from the chorus.

== Contributors ==
| Song production: Christoph Cronauer: Composition, lyrics, music production; Daniel Cronauer: Composition, Lyrics; Vanessa Mai: vocals, composition, lyrics; Mixcube Studio: Mastering; Matthias Zürkler (B-Case): Mixing, composition, lyrics, music production; Visualization: Sandra Ludewig: Photographer | Production: AFM Publishing: Music Publisher; Budde Music Publishing: Music Publisher; Edition Djorkaeff Beatzarre: music publisher; Edition Teamscore: Music Publisher; Edition Vanessa Mai: Music Publisher; Fisherman Songs: Music Publisher; Warner Music Group: Music label, distribution |

== Reception ==
A reviewer from the Magdeburg press portal described "Für mich bist du Liebe" as an emotional new single that deals with closeness and reliability, going beyond just romantic feelings.

Kevin Drewes of the German-language online magazine Schlagerpuls described it as an emotional love song that is both intimate and powerful. The very first lines paint a picture of a supportive relationship. A love that catches without suffocating. That grants freedom without creating distance. In the chorus, the feeling intensifies into certainty: "For me you are peace / And no, I can never get enough of you." Mai doesn't tell of a fleeting intoxication, but of someone who has become like a home; through shared highs and lows. A song like an inner compass". Musically, the singer underscores this depth with great feeling in her voice – compelling, but never overwrought. The song is carried by a minimalist piano melody, which, together with gentle guitar, strings, and a distinctive drumbeat, coalesces into an elegant, catchy production.
