= Zuhause bei Dir Tour =

2024 tour by Vanessa Mai

- Concert by Vanessa Mai
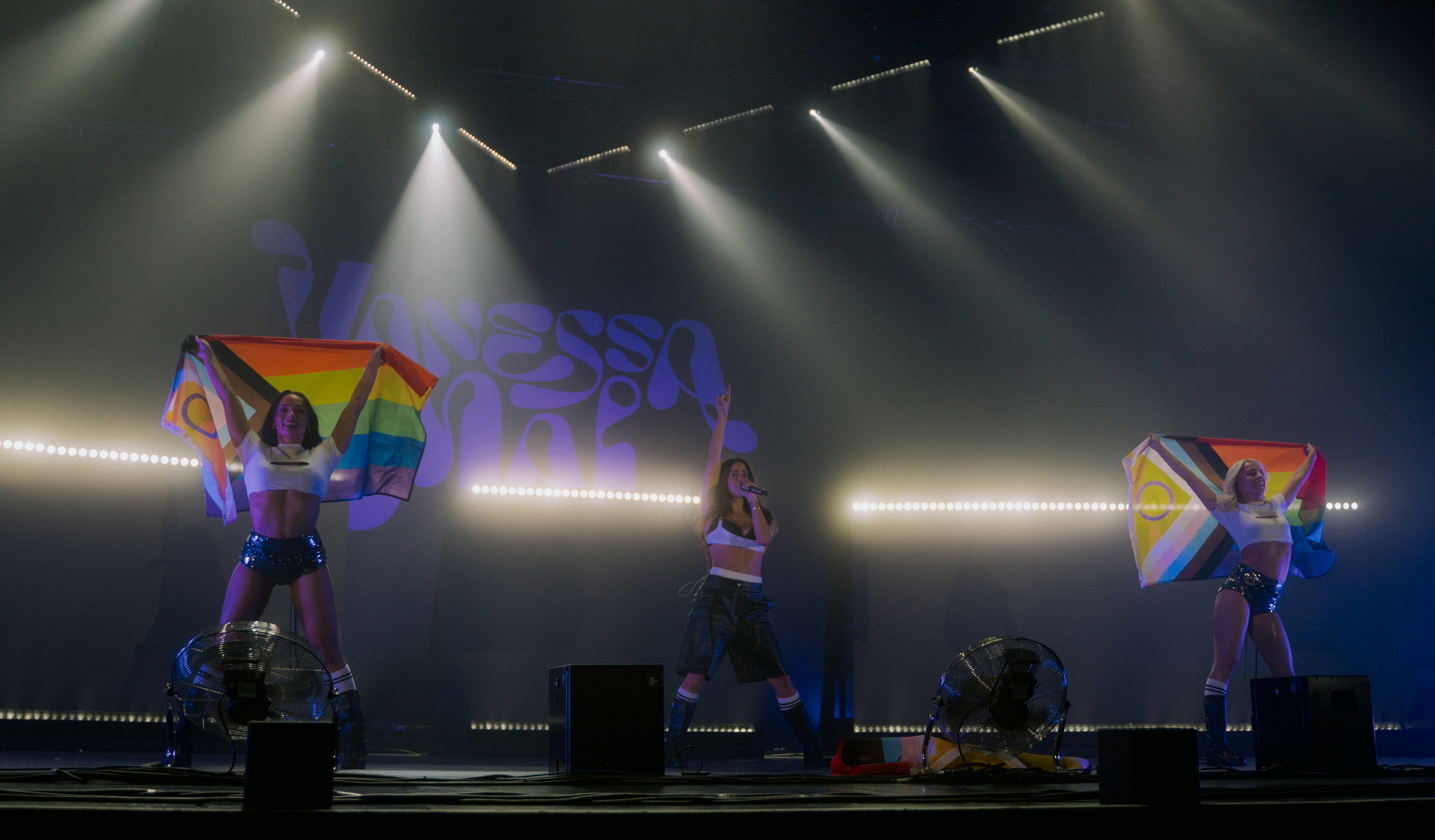
- Vanessa Mai performing on the tour
- Location: Germany
- Start date: November 14, 2024
- End date: November 30, 2024
- No. of shows: 9

Vanessa Mai concert chronology
- Für immer Tour; Zuhause bei Dir Tour

The Zuhause bei Dir Tour (lit. 'At Home Tour') is the fifth independent tour by the German Pop and Schlager singer Vanessa Mai.

== Background ==
The Zuhause bei Dir Tour was Vanessa Mai's eighth concert series – her fifth as a headliner. It ran from November 14 to November 30, 2024, and took her and her backing band to nine German cities..

In May 2024, she played her first concerts in the cities of Duisburg and Halle (Westfalen), while this was her seventh appearance in Berlin. She played her first main shows in Regensburg and Kempten, having previously performed there as part of the Das Beste der Feste Tour 2016 and the Die Schlager des Jahres Tour 2014 respectively. She played at the Centennial Hall in Frankfurt for the fifth time during the tour, more often than at any other venue to date. She also played her third concerts at Haus Auensee in Leipzig and the Theater am Aegi in Hanover and her second at the Metropol Theater Bremen. The venues during the tour generally had between 1,000 and 2,000 seats.

The tour did not feature an elaborate stage design; only a large banner with the artist's name was placed in the background, and three platforms were set up on the stage itself, on which Mai, her backing singer, and her dancers could be seen at intervals. The Frankfurt-based company Live Nation Entertainment was secured as the tour promoter.

== Support ==
Vanessa Mai's backing band consisted solely of backing vocalist Eva Becker and Jan Stürmer on guitar, who were primarily on stage during the first half of the concert. During the second half, Mai, sometimes accompanied by dancers, appeared on stage. This marked guitarist Stürmer's fourth concert series with Mai; he had previously been part of the live band during the Regenbogen Tour (2018), Teaser-Clubshow Tour (2019) and the Für immer Tour (2022). Becker played her second concert series with Mai after the Für immer Tour.

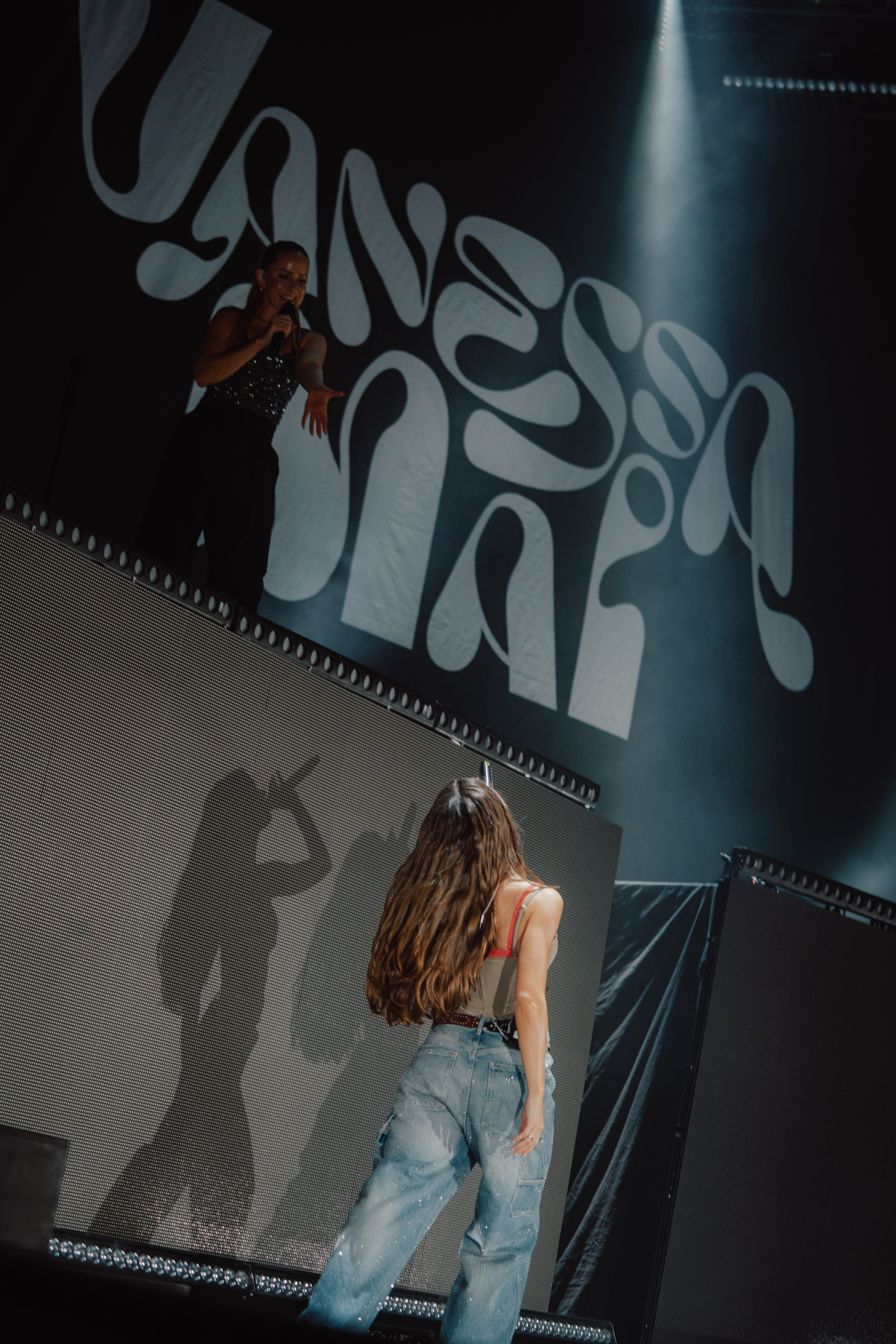
Vanessa Mai and Eva Becker

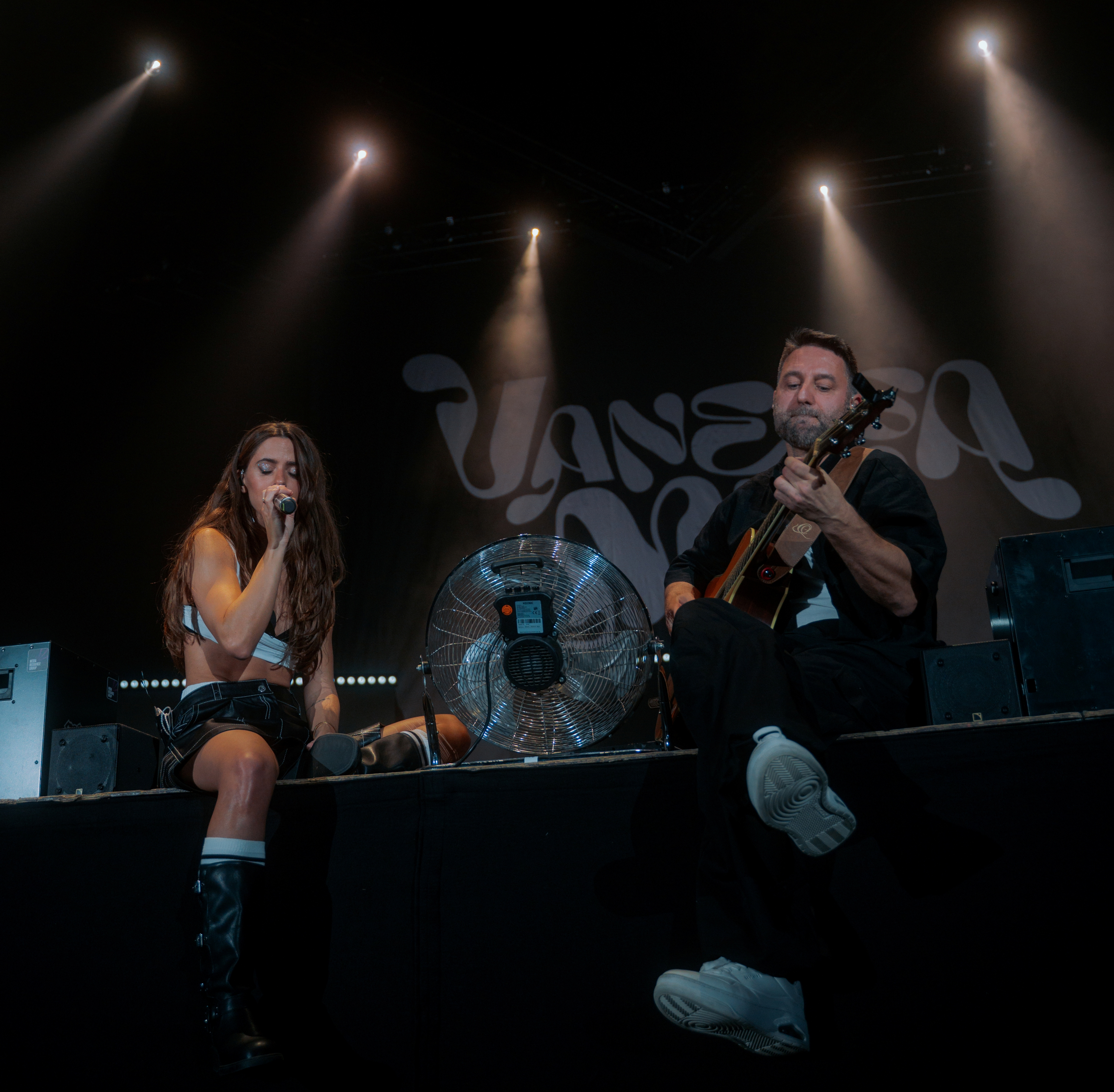
Vanessa Mai and Jan Stürmer

== Tour dates ==
Date	City	Venue	Country
14 November 2024	Halle (Westf.)	OWL Event Center	Germany
15 November 2024	Bremen	Metropol Theater Bremen	Germany
17 November 2024	Duisburg	Theater am Marientor	Germany
22 November 2024	Frankfurt am Main	Jahrhunderthalle	Germany
23 November 2024	Kempten	Bigbox Allgäu	Germany
27 November 2024	Hannover	Theater am Aegi	Germany
28 November 2024	Leipzig	Haus Auensee	Germany
29 November 2024	Regensburg	Audimax	Germany
30 November 2024	Berlin	Theater am Potsdamer Platz	Germany

== Set list ==
Vanessa Mai on the tour

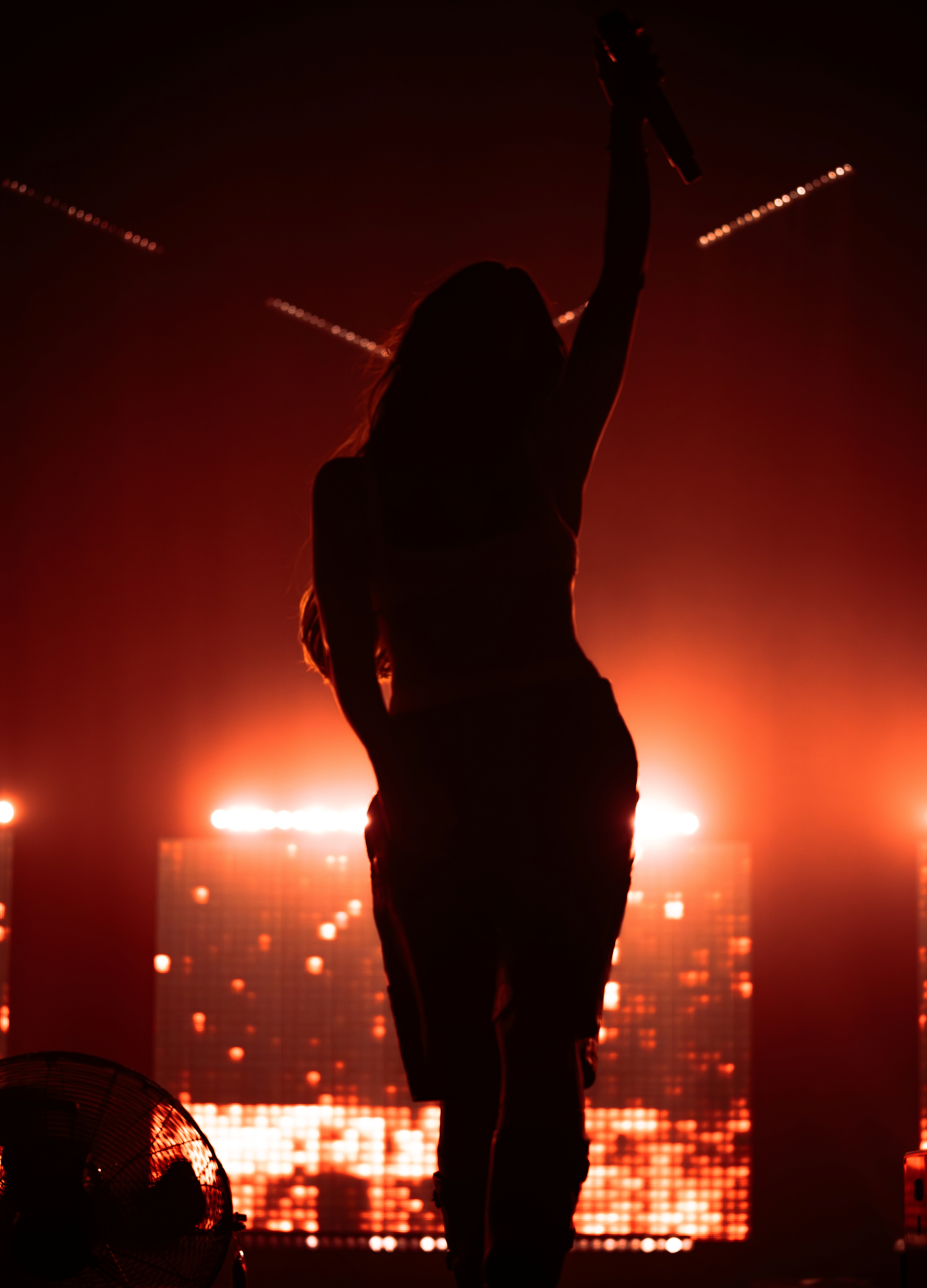
Bremen

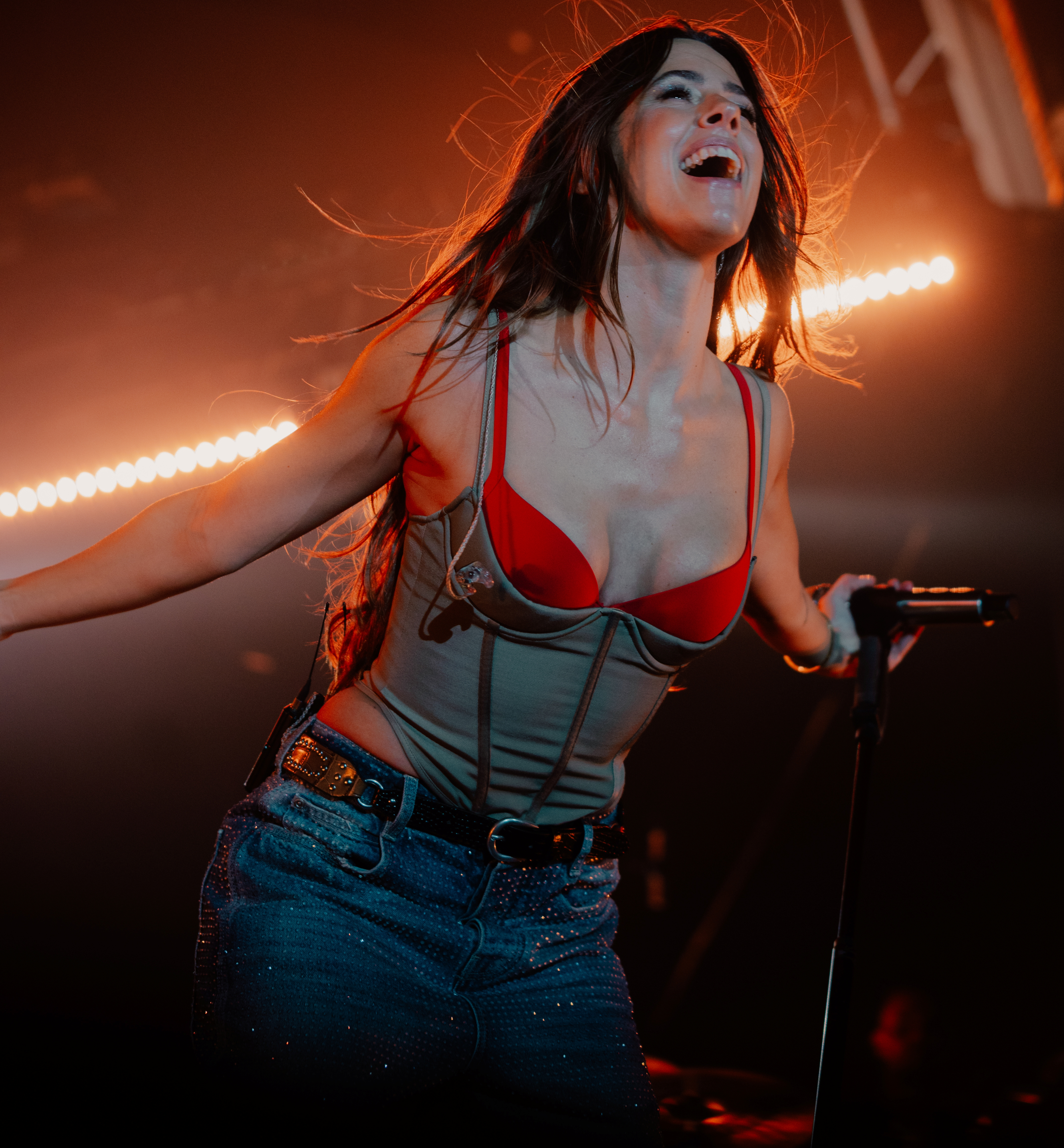
Halle (Westf.).

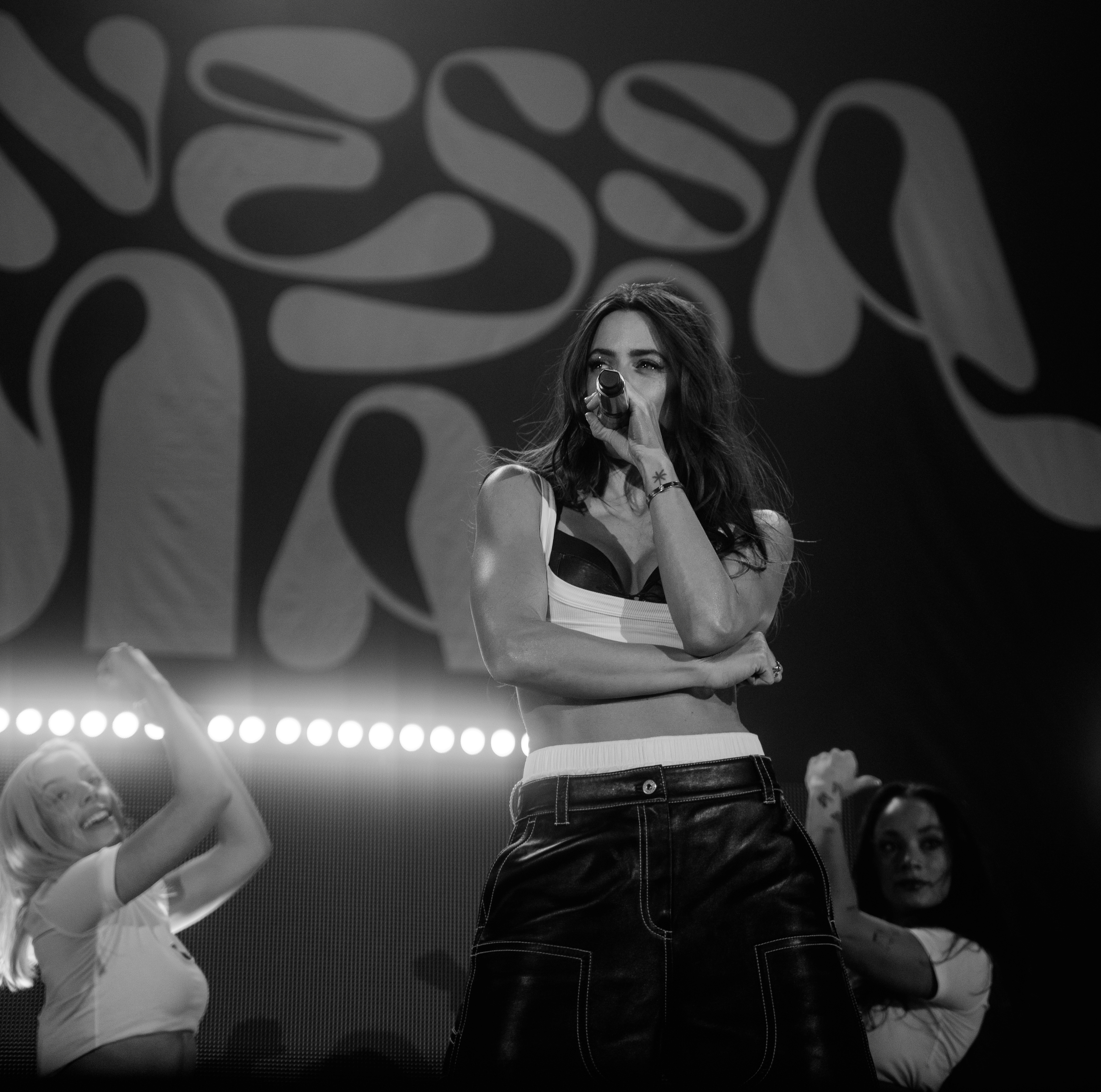
Kempten

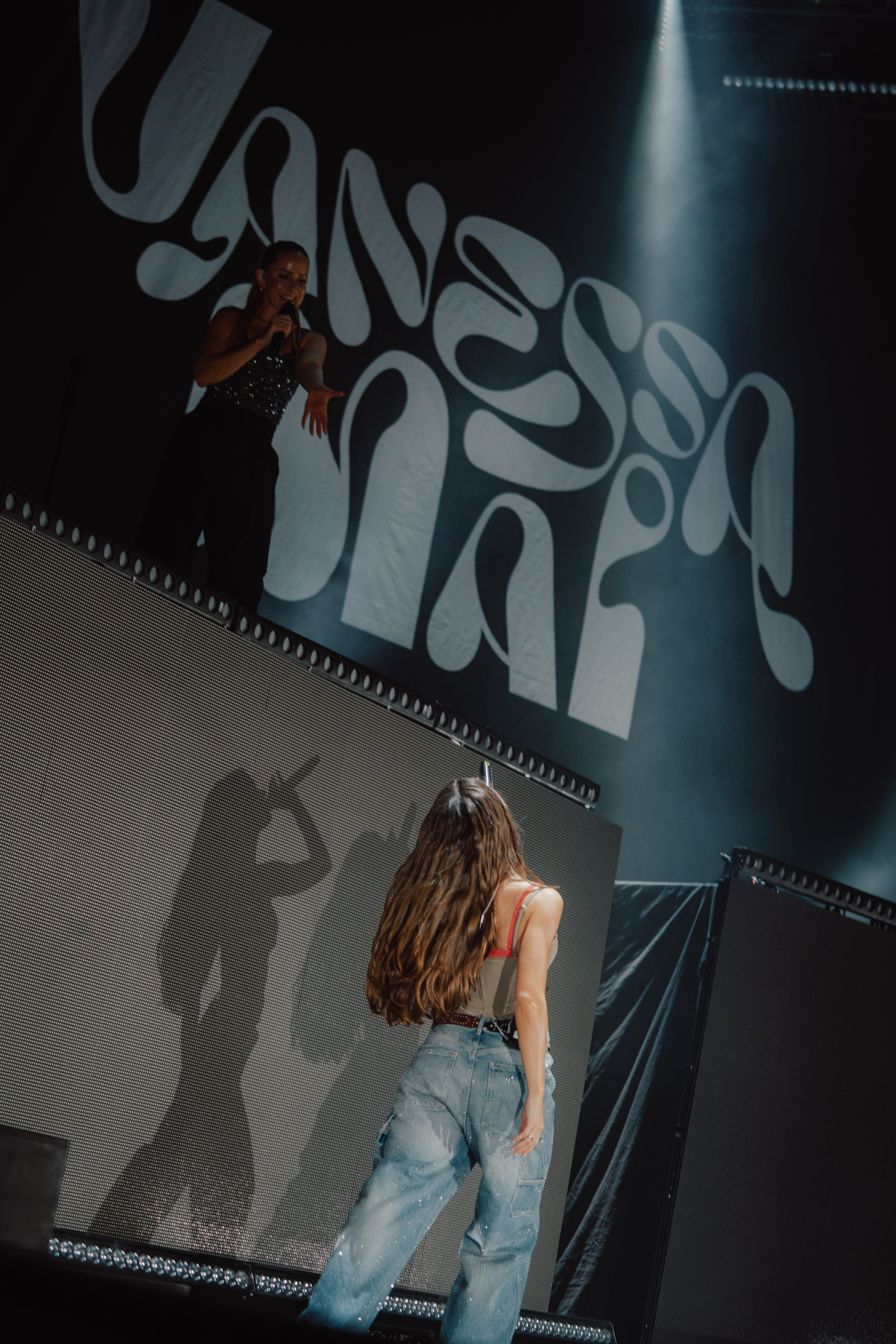
Kempten

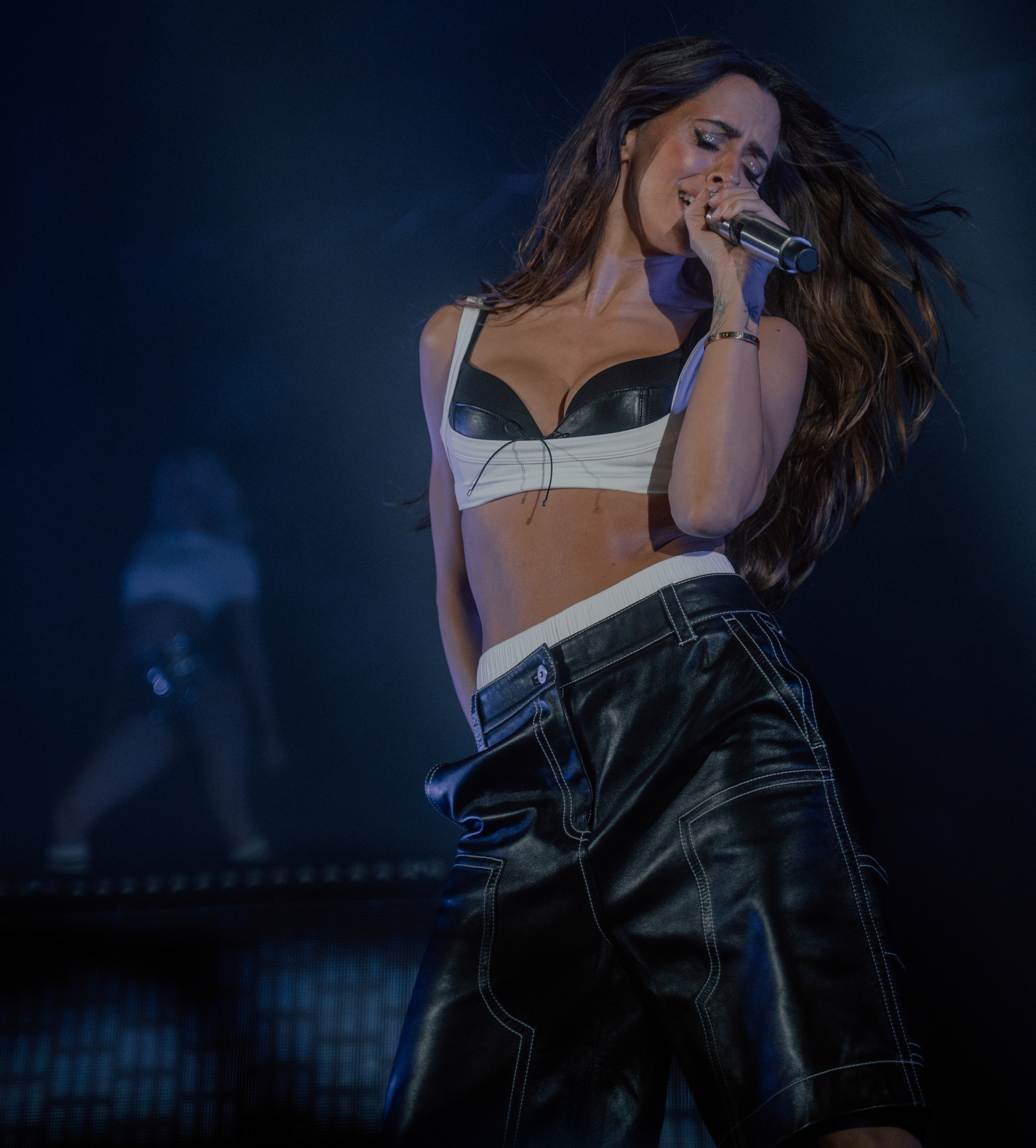
Frankfurt am Main

During the tour, Mai and her backup band presented 24 different songs, including a medley. This medley was a so-called "Wolkenfrei Medley," consisting of the songs "Du bist meine Insel", "Ich versprech dir nichts und geb dir alles," and "Von Tokio bis Amerika", three tracks from the early days of the band Wolkenfrei. This medley had already been part of the previous Für immer Tour. The main set consisted of 22 songs, presented in two sets of eleven songs each, with a 30-minute break in between. Two additional songs, "Himbeerrot (One Kiss)" and "Schneemann" were performed as encores. At some concerts, she also sang "Niemals". The repertoire was a pop music set, incorporating stylistic elements of electropop, pop, and German Schlager music, as well as some acoustic performances.

The setlist consisted of a kind of "Best Of" selection from Vanessa Mai and her Wolkenfrei releases. The majority of full tracks came from the album "Für immer" (Forever), released in January 2020, from which she performed , from which she performed "Venedig (Love Is in the Air)", "Ein letztes Mal", "Hast du niemals", "Highlight", and "Maisterwerk". The second-largest number of tracks came from the Wolkenfrei album "Hotel Tropicana", from which she played the four songs "Flieg mit mir", "Uns gehört die Welt", "Hotel Tropicana", and "Selfie von heut Nacht". Otherwise, Mai sang at least one track from each of her ten studio albums released to date. From Wolkenfrei's debut album, "Endlos verliebt" (February 2014) only the two songs "Du bist meine Insel" and "Ich versprech dir nichts und geb dir alles" were presented as part of the medley, making it the only album from which no full track was performed. From the studio album "Matrix" (May 2024) released during the same tour year, Mai played only one track, "Wir lieben das". In addition to the album tracks, Mai played four previously released singles: "Geiles Life" (October 2023), "Lobby" (November 2024), "Himbeerrot (One Kiss)" (September 2024) and "Schneemann" (November 2024) which had not yet appeared on any of her albums. The latter three were released in October of the following year on her eleventh studio album Traumfabrik.

In the last third, Mai and her guitarist Stürmer played two songs in an acoustic performance, using a so-called "random generator" to select the two songs, meaning she played different titles in each city during her acoustic set.

1. Wiedersehen
2. Geiles Life
3. Venedig (Love Is in the Air)
4. Ein letztes Mal
5. Hast du jemals
6. Flieg mit mir
7. Wolkenfrei-Medley
  1. Ich versprech dir nichts und geb dir alles
  2. Du bist meine Insel
  3. Von Tokio bis Amerika
8. Ich vermiss dich so
9. Highlight
10. Wir lieben das
11. Wolke 7
12. Lobby
13. Sommerwind
14. Uns gehört die Welt
15. Hotel Tropicana
16. Akustiktitel, der jeden Abend variierte
17. Akustiktitel, der jeden Abend variierte
18. Regenbogen
19. 747
20. Selfie von heut Nacht
21. Ich sterb für dich
22. Maisterwerk

Bonus:

1. Himbeerrot (One Kiss)
2. Schneemann

== Reception ==
The reviewer from Smalltalk Entertainment believes that Mai and her band transformed the Theater am Marientor into an atmospheric concert hall and delivered a captivating show for over two hours. The singer thrilled her audience with an energetic and emotional concert, as well as unforgettable musical moments. A particular highlight was a marriage proposal on stage. The couple shared this "unique moment" with the "touched" audience, and the singer later posted a video of the proposal on Instagram, where it also generated great enthusiasm. After the concert, Mai took time for her fans, posing for photos and thus providing a "perfect end" to the evening.

== Promotion ==
Six months before the Zuhause bei Dir tour, Vanessa Mai performed the concert event Zuhause 2024 – Das Heimspiel live in Stuttgart on 4 May 2024. This took place one day after the release of her latest studio album, Matrix, and served both to promote the album and to celebrate the singer's 10th anniversary as a performer. In September 2024, the concert recording was released in the ARD Mediathek and ZDF media libraries and broadcast on SWR television on 21 September 2024.

During the tour's opening concert in Halle (Westphalia), the closing track "Schneemann" (Snowman) premiered. It was released as a single the following day. The new Christmas song led to fans attending the concerts in snowman costumes, and some of them were brought on stage by Mai for the song.
