= 100% verliebt =

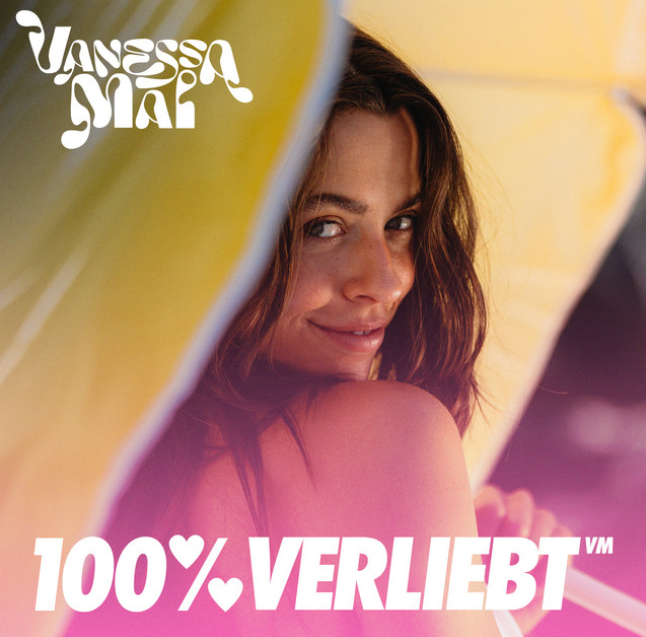

Single by Vanessa Mai

from the album Traumfabrik
- Language: German
- English title: 100% in love
- Released: 27 June 2025
- Genre: Pop, Schlager
- Label: Warner Music Group
- Songwriters: Christoph Cronauer, Daniel Cronauer, Vanessa Mai, Matthias Zürkler
- Producers: Christoph Cronauer, Matthias Zürkler

"100% verliebt" (lit. '100% in love') is a song by German pop and schlager singer Vanessa Mai, released on 27 June 2025. The track is the sixth single released from her eleventh studio album, "Traumfabrik".

== Origin and artwork ==
The song was written by the performer herself, together with co-writers Matthias Zürkler (B-Case) and brothers Chris and Daniel Cronauer. B-Case and Christoph Cronauer also jointly produced the song, while B-Case also handled the mixing. Mastering was completed by the team at Mixcube Studio in Austria.

Vanessa Mai is returning to her former songwriters and producers B-Case, Christoph Cronauer, and Daniel Cronauer for the production of her new album, following the release of two albums in the interim. All three previously worked with her between 2019 and 2022, often in joint roles. This collaboration resulted in the albums Für immer (January 2020), Mai Tai (March 2021), and Metamorphose (August 2022), which featured several singles, including the chart hit Melatonin (February 2022) and the earlier singles Himbeerrot (One Kiss) (September 2024), Lobby (November 2024), Von London nach New York (January 2025), and Sorry Sorry (April 2025).

The front cover of the single features Vanessa Mai, along with the song title and artist information. It shows her only from chest height, with her back to the camera, glancing over her shoulder. The dots of the percent sign in the title are represented by hearts. The photograph is by Leipzig-based photographer Sandra Ludewig, who has previously done several photoshoots with Mai; and was taken during the filming of the music video for the previous single, Sorry Sorry, in Spain.

== Publication and promotion ==
The first release of "100% verliebt" was as a single on 27 June 2025. It was released as a digital single track for download and streaming by Warner Music. Warner Music was also responsible for distribution, while the song was distributed by AFM Publishing, Budde Music Publishing, Edition Djorkaeff Beatzarre, Edition Teamscore, Edition Vanessa Mai and Fisherman Songs. On 10 October 2025 of the same year, the song was released as the sixth single from Vanessa Mai's eleventh studio album, Traumfabrik (catalog number: 502173283272).

The first signs of a new release appeared on 15 June 2025, when Mai first shared the phrase "100% verliebt" in a social media post, commenting, "100% in love with the open-air season". In the following days, Mai continued to use the phrase in her posts. The day before the single's release, she finally confirmed the official title and its release the following day. An official music video was not filmed, but a lyric video was released on the day of the single's release.

== Composition ==
100% verliebt. 100% Magie. Herzkarussell, ja, du bist genau mein Typ. Du sprengst meine Fantasie. 100% verliebt. Sowas hatt ich noch nie. Denn nur mit dir krieg’ ich dieses Hochgefühl. Bin 100% verliebt. — Refrain, original excerpt	Thematically, "100% verliebt" is a love song about love at first sight ("You totally swept me off my feet [...] We two aren't just meant for one night [...] 100% in love, I've never experienced anything like this before"). The lyrics describe this life-changing moment: "One look and suddenly the world stands still." "There's something in your eyes that'll keep me up tonight" – thus begins a story that alternates between fantasy and reality, between first approaches and the feeling that they've known each other for ages. In the chorus, everything culminates in a euphoric declaration: "For the very first time, I'm 100% in love [...] Heart whirl, yes, you're exactly my type" – a heart that can no longer be contained..".

The song is structured with an intro, two verses, and a chorus. It begins with the intro, which consists of only two lines and references the first two lines of the chorus. This is followed by the first verse, which is written as an eight-line verse . The first verse is followed by the prechorus, which also comprises two lines, before the actual chorus begins. The chorus is also written as an eight-line verse and concludes with the post-chorus, which consists of four lines and is predominantly, with the exception of the final line "100% in love," a repetition of the phrase "Oh-oh." The same structure is repeated with the second verse, and the song ends with the second chorus and its post-chorus. The second post-chorus has been extended by one line, a repetition of the final line.

== Contributors ==
Song production: Christoph Cronauer: Composition, lyrics, music production; Daniel Cronauer: Composition, Lyrics; Vanessa Mai: vocals, composition, lyrics; Mixcube Studio: Mastering; Matthias Zürkler (B-Case): Mixing, composition, lyrics, music production; Visualization: Sandra Ludewig: Photographer	Production: AFM Publishing: Music Publisher; Budde Music Publishing: Music Publisher; Edition Djorkaeff Beatzarre: music publisher; Edition Teamscore: Music Publisher; Edition Vanessa Mai: Music Publisher; Fisherman Songs: Music Publisher; Warner Music Group: Music label, distribution

== Reception ==
Kevin Drewes of Schlagerpuls described "100% verliebt" as the soundtrack for summer: "light-footed, euphoric, and charged with exactly the exhilaration that comes when your heart suddenly develops a life of its own." He said the song is pure endorphin release in pop-schlager form, a driving love song that oscillates between daydream and dance floor and is instantly catchy.

A reviewer from the German-language online magazine Pop-Himmel believes that in "100% verliebt" pop and Schlager music meet dance elements, and that the song is full of lightness and carefree spirit.

Andreas Breitkopf of the Hitbarometer called "100% verliebt" (100% in Love) "A summer hit guaranteed to make your heart flutter. Mai is releasing it just in time for the start of the hot season, providing the perfect soundtrack for everyone who feels butterflies in their stomach or longs for them. The song blends pulsating pop with an instant lightness that lifts your spirits – perfect for long summer nights, daydreams by the lake, or spontaneous dance breaks in the kitchen. The catchy hook, paired with lyrics that capture the magic of first sight, creates a real goosebump feeling."

Philipp Kause of laut.de gave the album Traumfabrik two out of five stars. In his review, he stated that the album, in a heterogeneous vein, wanders aimlessly between the Eurodance déjà vu of Nimmerland and the sing-along tune "oh-hoo".

== Chart position ==
100% verliebt failed to enter the singles charts, but reached number six on the weekly German Conservative Pop Airplay chart on 22 August 2025.
