= Schneemann (song) =

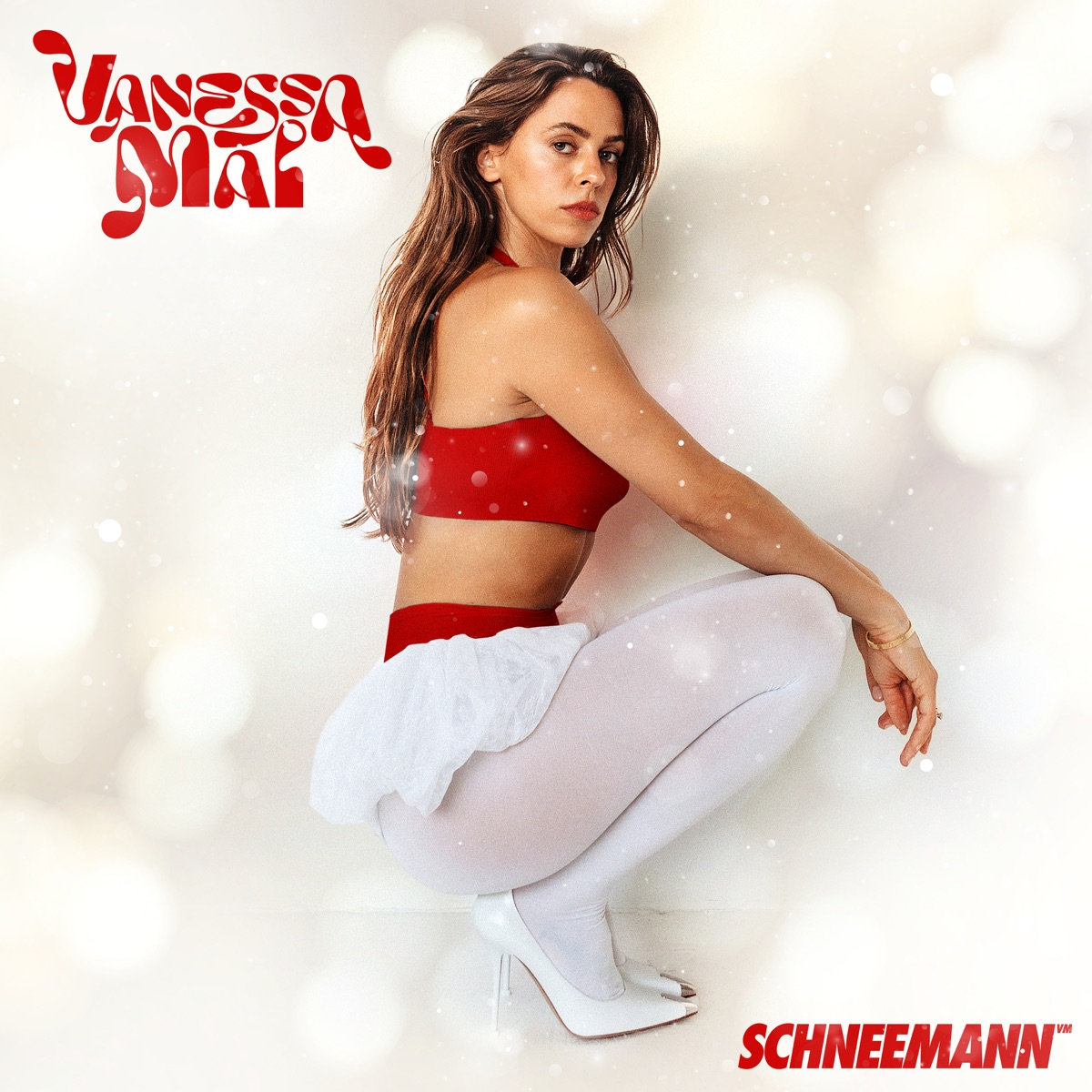

Single by Vanessa Mai

from the album Traumfabrik
- Language: German
- English title: Snowman
- Released: 15 November 2024
- Genre: Pop, christmas
- Length: 2:42
- Songwriters: Sia Furler, Greg Kurstin
- Producers: Christoph Cronauer, Daniel Cronauer, Matthias Zürkler

"Schneemann" is a Christmas song by German pop and schlager singer Vanessa Mai, released on 15 November 2025. It is a German-language adaptation of the song "Snowman" by the Australian singer and songwriter Sia. The song is the third single released from her eleventh studio album, Traumfabrik.

== Origin and artwork ==
"Schneemann" is a German-language adaptation of the song Snowman, which was originally recorded by Australian singer Sia Furler in 2017. The singer co-wrote the song with Greg Kurstin. Although the song features new German lyrics, Furler and Kurstin are credited as the sole authors. The production was handled by brothers Chris and Daniel Cronauer, along with Matthias Zürkler (B-Case). BB-Case also mixed the song. Mastering was done by the team at Mixcube Studio in Austria. All three producers have been working regularly with the singer Vanessa Mai since 2019, often jointly, resulting in albums such as Für immer (January 2020), Mai Tai (March 2021), and Metamorphose (August 2022).

The front cover features Mai against a white background, along with the artist name and song title. She is shown crouching, wearing a red top and red hip-hugging shorts, a white tulle skirt, white fishnet tights, and white high heels. The photograph was taken by Leipzig-based photographer Sandra Ludewig, who has done several photoshoots with Mai in the past.

== Publication and promotion ==
The song "Schneemann" was initially released as a single on 15 November 2024. It was released as a digital single track for download and streaming by Warner Music, who also handled distribution. The following year, on 10 October 2025, it was released as the third single from Mai's eleventh studio album, Traumfabrik (catalouge number: 502173283272).

The single was first announced by Mai herself when she uploaded a picture of herself in a snowman costume to social media on 31 October 2024.

== Background ==
Mai has previously released several film and audio recordings related to Christmas. "Schneemann" is Mai's fifth Christmas single, following "Ein Engel in der Weihnachtszeit" (December 2015), "Stille Nacht, heilige Nacht" (December 2016), "Letzte Weihnacht" (December 2017), and "Zuhause (Christmas Time)" (November 2020). The documentary "Zuhause (Eine Mainachtsgeschichte)" and the show " Staying Home for Christmas with Vanessa Mai" were also released in conjunction with the last single.

Mai explained her decision to create a German adaptation of Snowman as follows: "There are many German versions of various Christmas songs, but there wasn't one for Snowman before. And it fits perfectly into German, which isn't always the case".

== Contents ==
The lyrics to "Schneemann" are in German. The music and lyrics were composed and written jointly by Sia Furler and Greg Kurstin in C-sharp major. Musically and stylistically, the song is in the pop music genre.

"Schneemann" is based on the English original Snowman, but features new German lyrics that differ in content from the original. The original lyrics are: "'Cause I'm Mrs. Snow, 'til death we'll be freezing," which can be translated as "Because I am Mrs. Snow, until death we will freeze," but in Schneemann, this has been rewritten as "And if you let me, I am your secret". Therefore, it is an adaptation and not a simple cover version. As with the original, it is a love song, with "Schneemann" being used as a pseudonym for the protagonist's partner ("All I want this night is... My snowman and I").

The song is structured with two verses and a chorus. It begins with the first verse, which is written as a six-line stanza. This six-line stanza is itself composed of two three-line stanzas, with the second and third lines of each stanza rhyming identically. The chorus, which also consists of eight lines, follows the first verse . It concludes with the three-line post-chorus, which consists solely of the repeated line "My snowman and I" and the exclamation "Baby." The same structure is followed by the second verse, with the song ending after the second post-chorus.

I want you to know that I’m never leaving. ’Cause I’m Mrs. Snow, ’til death we’ll be freezing. Yeah, you are my home, my home for all seasons. So come on, let's go. Let's go below zero and hide from the sun. I’ll love you forever where we’ll have some fun. Yes, let's hit the North Pole and live happily. Please don't cry no tears now, it's Christmas, baby. — Original excerpt, Snowman	Ich will, dass du weißt, dass du bei mir frei bist. Und wenn du mich lässt, bin ich dein Geheimnis. Ich lass’ mich heut fall’n, du bist mein Zuhause. Im Wintergarten. Lass’ ich für dich Schnee fall’n, damit du noch bleibst. Ich hol’ uns den Nordpol und frier’ mit dir ein. Brech’ jedes Eis, nur damit du bеi mir bist. Alles, was ich in dieser Nacht will, das ist … — Original extract, Schneemann

== Music video ==
The music video for "Schneemann" (Snowman) was filmed at Gold und Gewitter Studio in Leipzig and premiered on YouTube on 6 December 2024. It shows only Mai, from the waist up, singing the song in front of a pink screen. She wears a red crop top and is accompanied by virtually falling snowflakes. The video is 2 minutes and 44 seconds long. It was directed by Bremen-based filmmaker Arne Hemmer. By October 2025, the video had over 270,000 views on YouTube.

== Contributors ==
Song production: Chris Cronauer: Record producer; Daniel Cronauer: Record producer; Sia Furler: Composition, Lyrics; Greg Kurstin: Composition, Lyrics; Mixcube Studio: Mastering; Matthias Zürkler (B-Case): Mixing, Music Production; Visualization (Cover): Sandra Ludewig: Fotografie	Production: Reinsberg: Film production (music video); Warner Music: Music label, distributor; Music video: Arne Hemmer: Director, editor; Sophie Jakubetz: Lighting, Set Assistant; Maksym Lobachov: Camera; Ben Mayer: Hair, makeup; Niklas Reinsberg: Color

== Reception ==
The reviewer from magdeburg-klickt.de believes that "Schneemann " has the potential to become a future "classic" on local Christmas playlists.

Philipp Kause of the magazine laut.de gave the album Traumfabrik two out of five stars. During his review, he concluded that there was a great track among both the fast and the slower songs, citing "Schneemann" as the slower one, whose catchy pop melody and memorable lyrics were undeniable..

== Tour ==
Shortly before the release of "Schneemann" (Snowman), Vanessa Mai started her Zuhause bei Dir Tour (Home with You). The single's release led to fans attending the tour dressed as snowmen.
