= Sorry Sorry (Vanessa Mai song) =

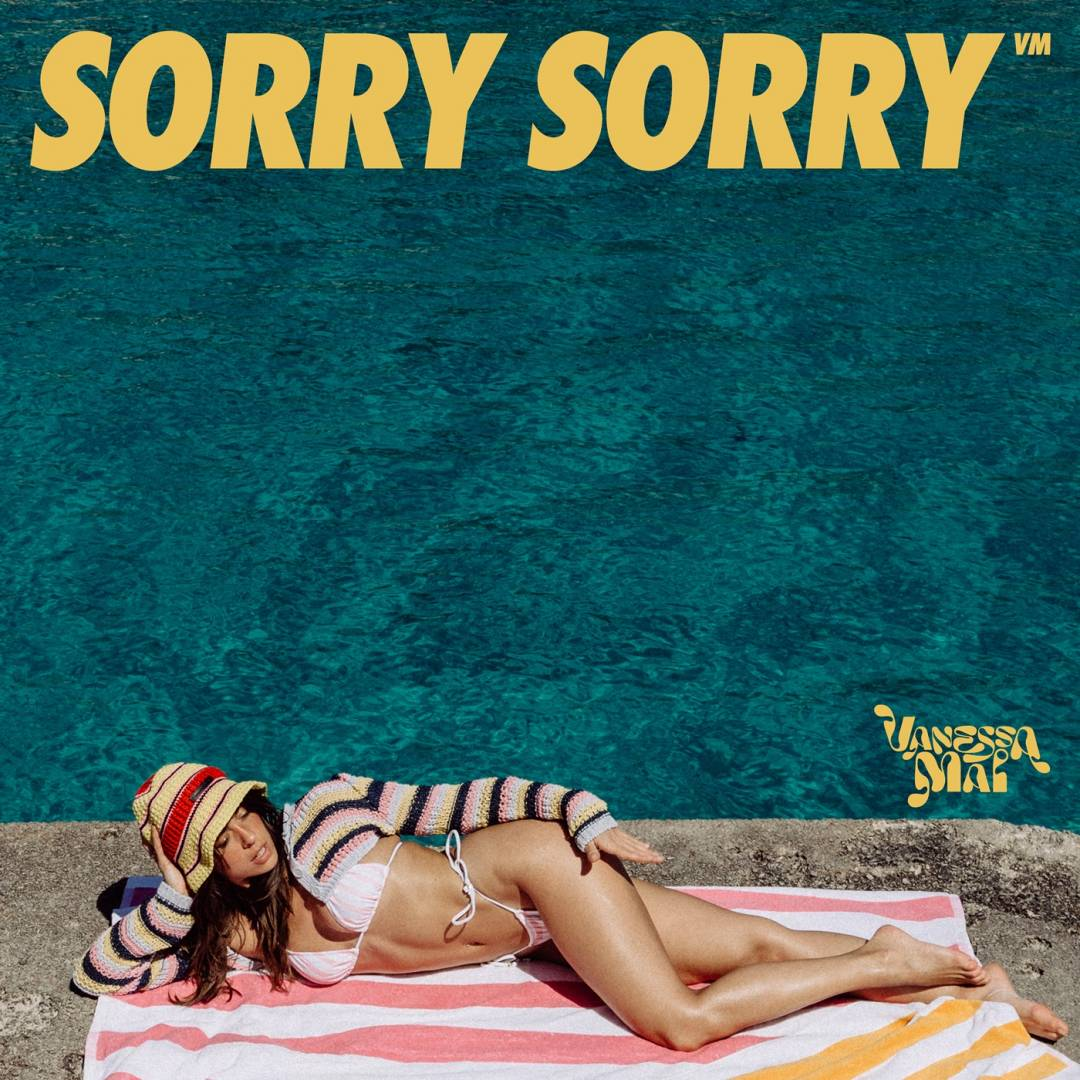

Single by Vanessa Mai

from the album Traumfabrik
- English title: German
- Released: 11 April 2025
- Genre: Disco, Pop, Schlager
- Length: 2:27
- Label: Warner Music Group
- Songwriters: Christoph Cronauer, Daniel Cronauer, Vanessa Mai, Matthias Zürkler
- Producers: Christoph Cronauer, Daniel Cronauer, Matthias Zürkler

"Sorry Sorry" is a song by German pop and Schlager singer Vanessa Mai, released on 11 April 2025. The track is the fifth single released from her eleventh studio album, "Traumfabrik".

== Origin and artwork ==
The song was written by the performer herself, together with co-writers Matthias Zürkler (B-Case) and brothers Christoph and Daniel Cronauer. With the exception of Mai, all co-writers were also responsible for the production. B-Case was additionally responsible for the mixing, instrumentation, and mastering of the song. He can be heard playing drums, while Christoph Cronauer also played guitar.

Vanessa Mai returned to her former songwriters and producers B-Case, Christoph Cronauer, and Daniel Cronauer after releasing two albums in the interim. All three previously worked with her between 2019 and 2022, often jointly. All three previously worked with her between 2019 and 2022, often in joint roles. This collaboration resulted in the albums Für immer (January 2020), Mai Tai (March 2021), and Metamorphose (August 2022), which featured several singles, including the chart hit Melatonin (February 2022) and the earlier singles Himbeerrot (One Kiss) (September 2024), Lobby (November 2024) and Von London nach New York (January 2025).

The front cover of the single features Vanessa Mai, along with the song title and artist information. She is wearing a bikini, a cropped cardigan, and a bucket hat, lying sideways on a beach towel with the sea in the background. The image was taken during the filming of the accompanying music video, where she wears the same outfit. The photograph is by Leipzig-based photographer Sandra Ludewig, who has previously done several photoshoots with Mai.

== Publication and promotion ==
The first release of "Sorry Sorry" was as a single on 11 April 2025. It was released as a digital single track for download and streaming by Warner Music. Warner Music was also responsible for distribution, while the song was distributed by AFM Publishing, Budde Music Publishing, Edition Djorkaeff Beatzarre, Edition Teamscore, Edition Vanessa Mai and Fisherman Songs. On 10 October of the same year, the song was released as the fifth single from Vanessa Mai's eleventh studio album, Traumfabrik (catalog number: 502173283272).

The first signs of a new release appeared on 15 March 2025, when Mai first shared the word "sorry" in a post on her social media. In the following days, Mai repeatedly included the word in her posts. On 28 March, she finally confirmed the official title and the release date of 11 April. Two days before its release, the title was available for pre-order.

== Composition ==
Du weißt, du machst mich crazy. Sorry, sorry, kann nicht ohne dich, brauch’ dich daily. Sorry, sorry, willst du mit mir um die Welt zieh’n? Oder bleibst du nur ein Teil von meinem daydream? (Mh). — Refrain, original excerpt	Unlike the English song title "Sorry Sorry," the lyrics are primarily in German and were written by the performer herself, as well as B-Case and the brothers Christoph and Daniel Cronauer. Besides the word "sorry," the lyrics contain various other Anglicisms, including "bye-bye", "crazy", "daily", "daydream", and "nicer". All the lyricists composed the music in the key of C-sharp major with a tempo of 112 beats per minute. Musically, the song falls within the pop genre, while stylistically it is related to disco and German Schlager music.

The song's content revolves around the thrill of being in love ("You know you drive me crazy") and the question of whether it could become something more ("Do you want to travel the world with me / Or will you just remain a part of my daydream?").

The song is structured with two verses and a chorus. It begins with the first verse, which is written as a four-line stanza. This is followed by the so-called pre-chorus, which also consists of four lines, before the actual chorus begins. The chorus is written as an eight-line stanza, composed of a repeating four-line stanza. The same structure is repeated in the second verse. The song ends with the second chorus.

== Music video ==
The music video for "Sorry Sorry" was filmed in Spain and premiered on YouTube on 13 April 2025. It shows Vanessa Mai riding a Vespa and singing the song in various locations, including in front of a kind of finca while listening to her Walkman, and at different beaches. The video is 2 minutes and 30 seconds long and was directed by Kalle Hildinger. By October 2025, the video had over 450,000 views on YouTube.

== Contributors ==
Song production: Christoph Cronauer: Guitar, Composition, Lyrics, Music Production; Daniel Cronauer: Composition, lyrics, music production; Vanessa Mai: vocals, composition, lyrics; Matthias Zürkler (B-Case): Mixing, Composition, Lyrics, Mastering, Music Production, Drums; Visualization: Sandra Ludewig: Photography; Production: AFM Publishing: Music Publisher; Budde Music Publishing: Music Publisher; Edition Djorkaeff Beatzarre: music publisher; Edition Teamscore: Music Publisher; Edition Vanessa Mai: Music Publisher; Fisherman Songs: Music Publisher; Much Love Media: Film production (music video); Warner Music Group: Music label, distribution	Music video: Lennart Bestehorn: Production Assistant; Alexander Charlet: Color correction, editing; Andreas Faltin: Lighting Assistant; Bennet Herter: Executive Production; Grit Hildenbrand: Hair, Makeup; Kalle Hildinger: Creative Director, Director; Sarah Karsten: Styling; Sandra Ludewig: Art Direction; Malte Niessen: Camera Assistant; Felix Passow: Set-Runner; Marc van Hoorn: Camera

== Reception ==
Kevin Drewes from the online magazine Schlagerpuls believes that Mai's " Sorry Sorry" is the perfect soundtrack for endless days and nights spent dancing. The song is full of lightness, dolce vita, and heart palpitations – the perfect companion for unforgettable summer moments. There's hardly anything better than the feeling of summer, which Mai captures with playful ease.

Stephan Imming of the Schlagerprofis believed that with the song Mai is once again demonstrating her versatility, returning to Schlager territory and delivering Sorry Sorry Wolkenfrei vibes.

The reviewer from Songtexte.com described "Sorry Sorry" as the perfect soundtrack for summer 2025, as the song is full of lightness, joie de vivre, and heart palpitations. Inspired by the Italian zest for life, the song combines danceable beats with romantic longing, making it the perfect track for warm nights, sunsets, and days by the sea. After its predecessor, "Von London nach New York," the singer is now taking a slightly more pop-oriented direction without losing her modern pop style. The production has a light, summery sound and invites you to dance and dream. With "Sorry Sorry, " Mai once again proves her feel for timing, sound, and emotion, delivering the perfect kick-off for the upcoming summer season.

Philipp Kause of the magazine laut.de gave the album Traumfabrik two out of five stars. During his review, he concluded that Sorry Sorry is a foray into the disco genre, featuring a scenario with Italian ice cream and a Vespa ride, with Mai using youth slang ("everything's a bit nicer with you") in homeopathic doses.
