= Traumfabrik (album) =

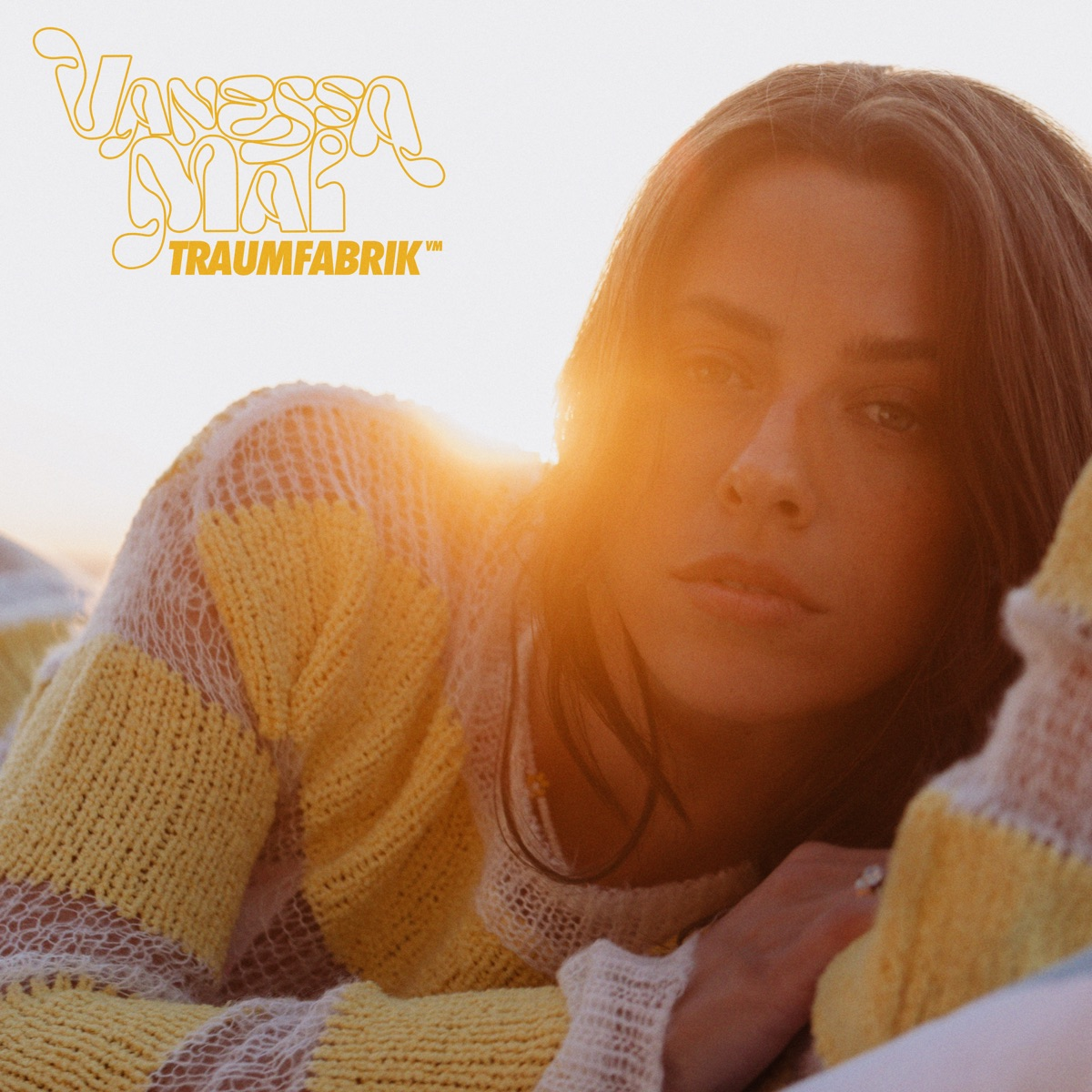

Studio album by Vanessa Mai
- Released: 10 October 2025
- Genres: Dance, pop, schlager
- Length: 37:54
- Language: German
- Label: Warner Music
- Producers: Christoph Cronauer, Daniel Cronauer, Matthias Zürkler

Singles from Traumfabrik
- 1. "Himbeerrot (One Kiss)" Released: 6 September 2024; 2. "Lobby" Released: 1 November 2024; 3. "Schneemann" Released: 15 November 2024; 4. "Von London nach New York" Released: 31 January 2025; 5. "Sorry Sorry" Released: 11 April 2025; 6. "100% verliebt" Released: 27 June 2025; 7. "Für mich bist du Liebe" Released: 22 August 2025; 8. "Küss mich wach" Released: 19 September 2025

Traumfabrik (lit. 'Dream Factory') is the eleventh studio album by German pop and Schlager singer Vanessa Mai, released in October 2025.

== Origin and artwork ==
=== Origin ===
With the exception of one cover version, all the songs on the album were written by Vanessa Mai herself, along with co-writers Chris Cronauer and Matthias Zürkler (B-Case). This marked Mai's first involvement in the songwriting process since the production of her eighth studio album, Metamorphose (August 2022). The cover version is the song "Schneemann", a German-language adaptation of "Snowman" by Sia (November 2017), which was written by Sia Furler herself, along with Greg Kurstin. Although the song features new German lyrics, Furler and Kurstin are listed as the sole authors. In addition, the trio co-wrote nine songs with Christoph's brother, Daniel Cronauer, and one with Elżbieta Steinmetz, who co- wrote "Lobby". While only seven composers and lyricists contributed to this album, including the cover version; Twenty people were employed in the production of its predecessor, Matrix (May 2024).

B-Case and Christoph Cronauer were also jointly responsible for the production of all the tracks and for parts of the instrumentation. The duo received support from Daniel Cronauer for the production of the songs "Schneemann" and Sorry Sorry erhielt das Duo Unterstützung durch Daniel Cronauer. For the instrumentation, B-Case played drums on "Sorry Sorry", while Christoph Cronauer played guitar on the same track. B-Case was also responsible for mixing all the songs and mastering "Sorry Sorry". The remaining twelve tracks were mastered by the team at Mixcube Studio in Austria.

While Vanessa Mai had almost completely replaced her studio staff for the production of her previous album, she returned to old collaborators for the production of Traumfabrik. Following the two studio albums released in the interim, Hotel Tropicana (March 2023) and Matrix, she reunited with her former songwriters and producers B-Case, Christoph Cronauer, and Daniel Cronauer. All three had already worked with her between 2019 and 2022, mostly in joint roles. This collaboration resulted in the studio album Für immer (January 2020), Mai Tai (March 2021), and Metamorphose (August 2022), featuring several singles, including the chart hit Melatonin (February 2022). Mai explained her return to her old writing and production team to Radio Melody by saying that she had reflected on the past few years and realized that this was "Vanessa Mai," that she enjoyed working with this team, that it felt right, and that she also felt the results of this collaboration were the most appealing to her fans. This was the first time Mai had worked with Ela and the Mixcube team.

=== Artwork ===
The album's front cover features Vanessa Mai, along with the album title and artist information. She is lying face down on a sunlounger, wearing a yellow and white striped mesh top and bikini bottoms. She is supporting herself on the lounger with her right arm and left shoulder, looking towards the camera, with light filtering through from the sunset visible in the background. The photograph, as well as all the photos in the accompanying booklet, was taken by Leipzig-based photographer Sandra Ludewig, who has previously done several photoshoots with Mai. The photoshoot took place in Spain in early April 2025.

== Publication and promotion ==
=== Publication ===
Traumfabrik was first released on 10 October 2025, by Warner Music. The album was released in its original format as a CD (catalog number: 502173283272) as well as for download and streaming, featuring 13 songs, including twelve new compositions and one cover version. Warner Music was also responsible for distribution, while all tracks except "Schneemann" were published by Budde Music Publishing, Edition Djorkaeff Beatzarre, Edition Elan, Edition Teamscore, Edition Vanessa Mai and Fisherman Songs. The track "Lobby" was additionally published by Edition Elan. The album was available for pre-order from 2 May 2025.

On the day of its initial release, the album was released in four additional limited physical editions, alongside the standard digital and physical versions. One of these editions included a ticket to the release concert at the Punch Line Club in Berlin on 11 October 2025. An enhanced edition of this included admission to the soundcheck, and a further enhanced edition included a meet and greet at the release concert. While the soundcheck set sold out within a few days, the meet and greet set sold out even before the pre-sale began, as it had previously been available exclusively to newsletter subscribers. A box set was also released, which, in addition to the CD, included other merchandise such as a T-shirt, a 36-page A5 photo book with previously unpublished images from the album campaign, an A5 sticker sheet, and a hand-signed autograph card. Three winners were also drawn from all purchasers of this box set and were allowed to participate in the backstage meet-and-greet at the release concert.

=== Promotion ===
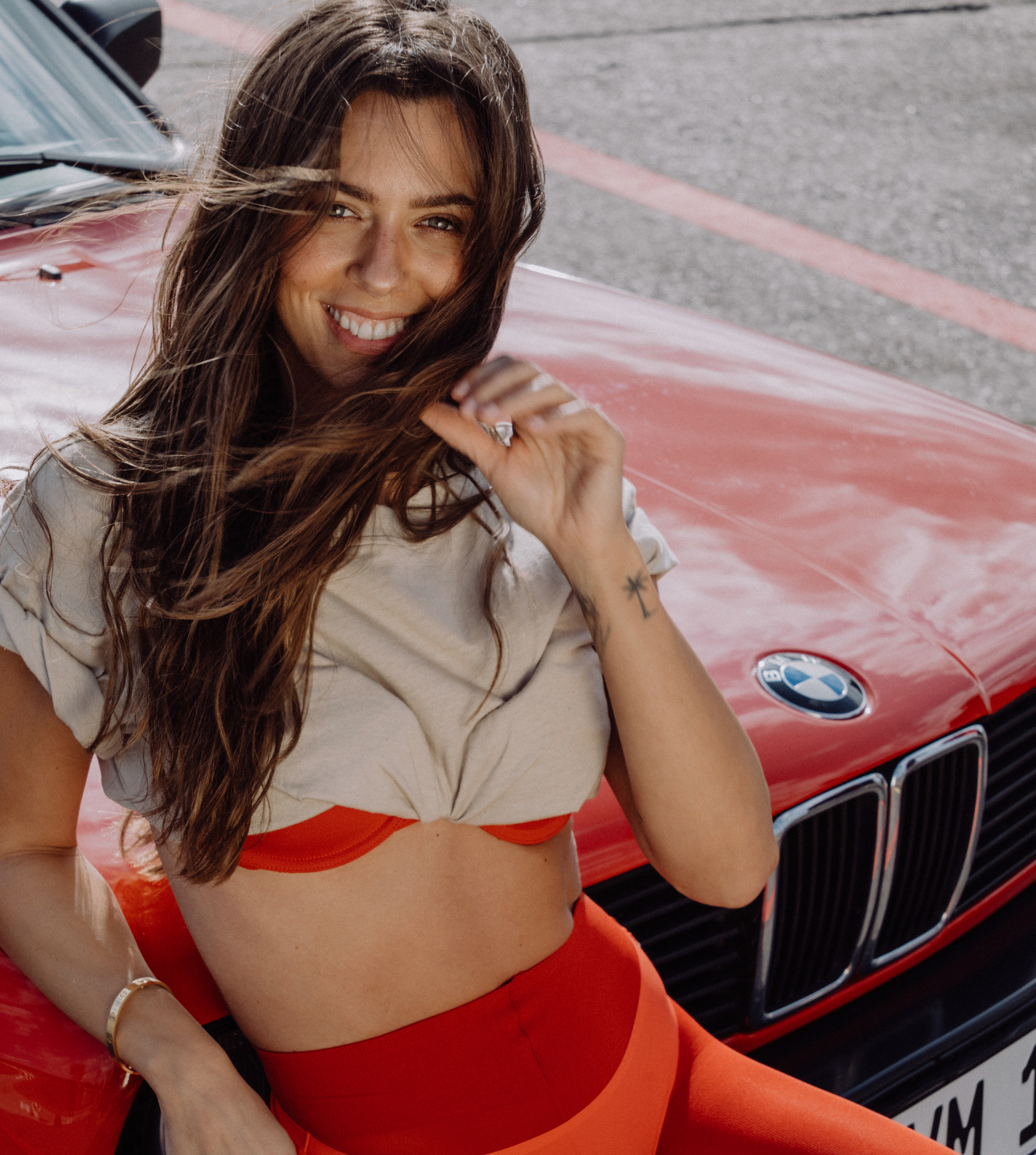
Press photo from May 2025

The first signs of a new release appeared in August 2024, when it was announced that a single release party would take place in September of that year at the Bergwerk Hotel Sonnenhof in Aspach, Baden-Württemberg. In the same month, the release of the first single Himbeerrot (One Kiss), was announced. Later that same month, the singer presented a longer teaser of it at the Da Capo! Open Air im Schlosshof Alzey Festival in the courtyard of Alzey Castle. In early September 2024, it was also announced that Mai had parted ways with her old label.

During the promotional phase, she performed "Himbeerrot (One Kiss)" live several times during prime time on ARD, including on 19 October 2024, during the The Festivals with Florian Silbereisen, on 31 December 2024, during the Silvester-Schlagerbooom 2025 – Wunderlichtershow! and at the Schlagerchampions on 11 January 2025. With the subsequent single "Von London nach New York," she performed on 15 February 2025, during prime time on The Giovanni Zarrella Show on ZDF. She also performed "Lieber Zweifel" live on the NDR Talk Show on the day of the album's release.

=== Tours ===
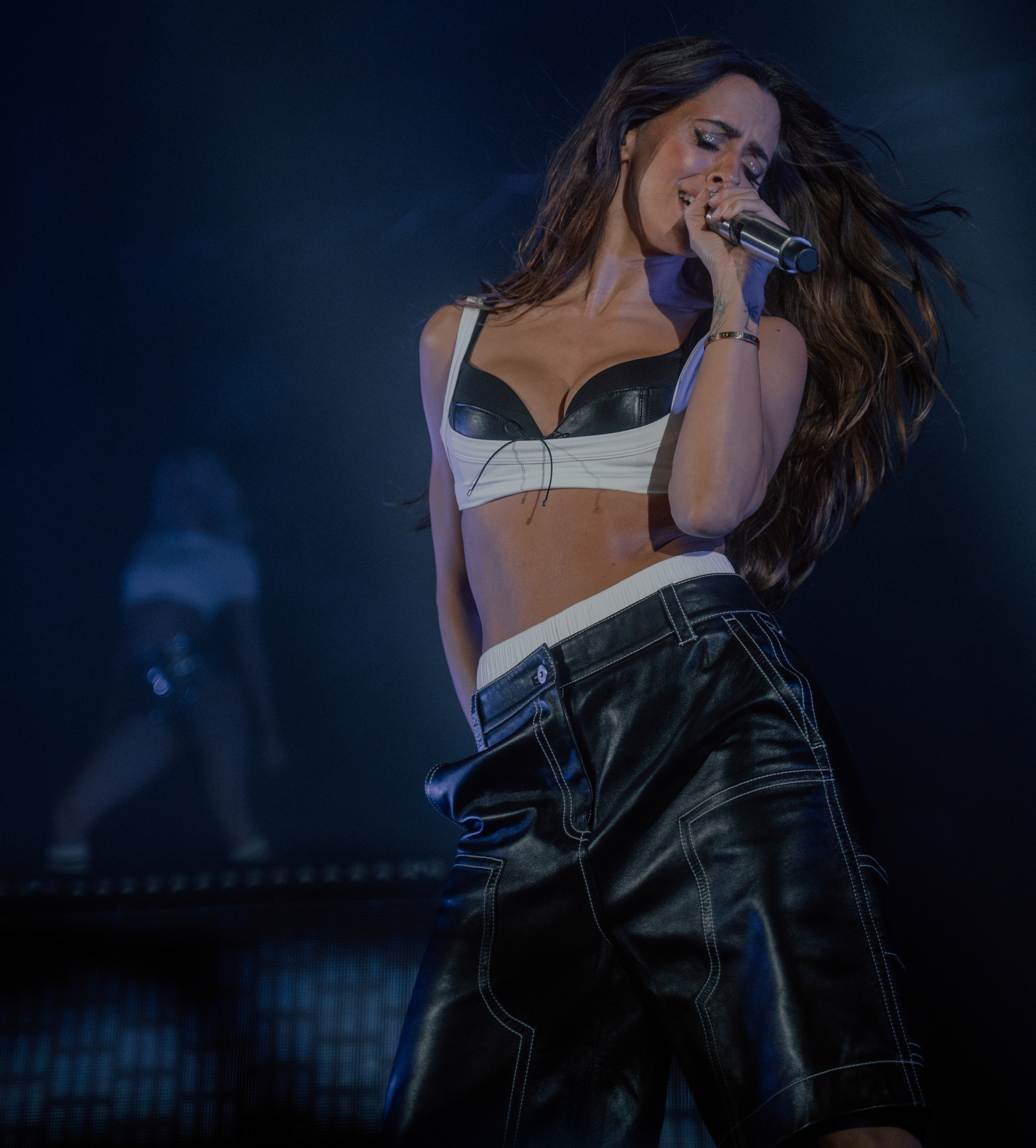
May performing during the " Zuhause bei Dir" tour in Frankfurt am Main (2024)

In September 2025, it was announced that Vanessa Mai would be going on her Traumfabrik tour from September to October 2026. The tour was scheduled to take her and her live band to eight German cities. This marked the first time the singer would also be acting as a tour promoter. The first three singles, "Himbeerrot (One Kiss)", "Lobby" und" Schneemann" were already part of Mai's Zuhause bei Dir Tour, which took her to nine German cities in November 2024.

== Background ==
For Vanessa Mai, the release of Traumfabrik represents a musical restart. In early September 2024, it was announced that she would be switching to the record label Warner Music Group, thus ending her partnership with Ariola, with whom she had worked for over ten years and enjoyed commercial success, including nine Top 10 Albums in Germany and two number-one albums, Regenbogen (August 2017) and Schlager (August 2018). Mai herself commented on the move with the words:

When asked about the title "Traumfabrik" (Dream Factory), the singer told Spot on news:

"I’m incredibly happy to be starting a new chapter in my musical journey with Warner Music. It was crucial for me to find a label that understands my vision and gives me the space to express myself creatively and constantly reinvent myself. With the Warner Music team, I’ve found exactly the partner who will support me on this path"

— Vanessa Mai, September 2024

== Composition ==
All the lyrics on the album are written in the German language, even though "Sorry Sorry" ( English for "apology") is an English title. The actual content of the lyrics, however, is in German. The lyrics and compositions are by seven different writers, including B-Case, Christoph Cronauer, and Vanessa Mai (12 tracks each), and Daniel Cronauer (9 tracks). Musically, the songs fall into the categories of Dance, Pop and Schlager, stylistically within the pop-Schlager genre, with elements of Eurodance ("Nimmerland") or House and Trance (Lobby). Having already appeared as a backing vocalist on Mai's eighth studio album Metamorphose, Christoph Cronauer is the only guest vocalist on Traumfabrik, appearing on the track "Auf freien Feldern". According to his own statement, Mai had wanted the duet for a long time.

The tracks on the album are mainly love songs, about “lightness, love and longing”. The singer herself told the German Press Agency: "For me, there is nothing more authentic than singing about love. I have been very happy with my husband for a very long time." She said she does not feel the same way about songs about "heartbreak" right now because it does not fit with her current stage of life. On the album Vanessa Mai sings about, among other things, a special kiss ("Himbeerrot (One Kiss)"), passionate feelings in a hotel lobby ("Lobby"), freedom and carefree days (“Auf freien Feldern”), traveling with loved ones ("Von London nach New York"), the nervous feeling of falling in love ("Sorry Sorry"), the life-changing moment or the euphoric declaration of being in love ("100% verliebt" and "Küss mich wach"), self-doubt (Lieber Zweifel) or letting go and feeling good (Traumfabrik).

Schneemann is a German-language adaptation of Snowman (November 2017), originally by Australian singer Sia, which is about the transience of a love affair that threatens to melt away in the heat. Mai explained her decision to create a German adaptation of Snowman as follows: “There are many German versions of various Christmas songs, but there wasn’t one for Snowman before. And it fits perfectly into German, which isn’t always the case”.

Mai herself also plays with the meaning of some of the titles. For example, she described every word in "Für mich bist du Liebe" as "simply true" and said it's very funny what happens when songs are released. She naturally has a connection to the songs, but when they're released, something completely different happens to them. The singer is very curious to see for whom her fans listen to the song, or what they feel. She further stated that, for example, this song doesn't have to be addressed only to one's partner or a specific person, but that anyone can connect anything that is important to them to it. The singer herself described the title track, "Traumfabrik" (Dream Factory)", as an ode to her fans and her husband.

"My husband Andreas and I have been a team since the beginning of my career, both professionally and personally. This is our dream factory and also the world we've created for ourselves over the past few years. So there's more to it than just a simple song for celebrating. At the same time, for me, there's nothing more authentic than making such lighthearted tracks, because I've been in a happy relationship and marriage for 13 years. I did dabble in heartbreak songs once, but that's not really my thing anymore"

— Vanessa Mai, 10 October 2025

== Track listing ==
No.	title	Author(s)	Producer(s)	length
1.	Himbeerrot (One Kiss)	Christoph Cronauer, Vanessa Mai, Matthias Zürkler	Christoph Cronauer, Matthias Zürkler	2:31
2.	Traumfabrik	Christoph Cronauer, Daniel Cronauer, Vanessa Mai, Matthias Zürkler	Christoph Cronauer, Matthias Zürkler	2:48
3.	Küss mich wach	Christoph Cronauer, Vanessa Mai, Matthias Zürkler	Christoph Cronauer, Matthias Zürkler	2:58
4.	Auf freien Feldern (feat. Chris Cronauer)	Christoph Cronauer, Vanessa Mai, Matthias Zürkler	Christoph Cronauer, Matthias Zürkler	4:02
5.	Von London nach New York	Christoph Cronauer, Daniel Cronauer, Vanessa Mai, Matthias Zürkler	Christoph Cronauer, Matthias Zürkler	2:23
6.	Sorry Sorry	Christoph Cronauer, Daniel Cronauer, Vanessa Mai, Matthias Zürkler	Christoph Cronauer, Daniel Cronauer, Matthias Zürkler	2:27
7.	Keine deiner Worte	Christoph Cronauer, Daniel Cronauer, Vanessa Mai, Matthias Zürkler	Christoph Cronauer, Matthias Zürkler	3:13
8.	100% verliebt	Christoph Cronauer, Daniel Cronauer, Vanessa Mai, Matthias Zürkler	Christoph Cronauer, Matthias Zürkler	2:55
9.	Nimmerland	Christoph Cronauer, Daniel Cronauer, Vanessa Mai, Matthias Zürkler	Christoph Cronauer, Matthias Zürkler	2:40
10.	Lobby	Christoph Cronauer, Daniel Cronauer, Vanessa Mai, Elżbieta Steinmetz, Matthias Zürkler	Christoph Cronauer, Matthias Zürkler	2:42
11.	Für mich bist du Liebe	Christoph Cronauer, Daniel Cronauer, Vanessa Mai, Matthias Zürkler	Christoph Cronauer, Matthias Zürkler	3:17
12.	Lieber Zweifel	Christoph Cronauer, Daniel Cronauer, Vanessa Mai, Matthias Zürkler	Christoph Cronauer, Matthias Zürkler	3:16
13.	Schneemann	Sia Furler, Greg Kurstin	Christoph Cronauer, Daniel Cronauer, Matthias Zürkler	2:42
Total length:				37:54

== Single releases ==
Eight singles were released from the album, all of which were released before the album itself and failed to chart. These were generally released as individual digital tracks for download and streaming.

The first single, "Himbeerrot (One Kiss)" on 6 September 2024, is a love song in which Mai sings about a special kiss. The single failed to enter the singles chart, but reached number 18 on the weekly German Conservative Pop Airplay chart on 11 October 2024. In September 2024, it also reached number 41 on the monthly Conservative Pop Airplay chart, and number 19 the following month. Two months later, the second single "Lobby" was released on 1 November 2024. In the song Mai sings about a hotel lobby where passionate feelings arise. Leading up to this release, Mai garnered significant media attention with a social media post on 27 October 2024, announcing the single. The post was accompanied by a video showing the singer in a white, transparent top without a bra. Media reactions included headlines such as "Forbiddenly hot advertising" on News.de, "Nipple alert!" on Schlager.de, and "Not everyone is thrilled... She shows everything in the transparent top" in the Austrian newspaper Heute. Just two weeks later, the singer released "Schneemann", her fifth Christmas single after "Ein Engel in der Weihnachtszeit" (Dezember 2015), "Stille Nacht, heilige Nacht" (December 2016), "Letzte Weihnacht" (December 2017) and "Zuhause (Christmas Time)" (November 2020).

The calendar year 2025 began with the release of the fourth single, "Von London nach New York" (From London to New York), on 31 January 2025. Like "Himbeerrot (One Kiss)", the song failed to chart, but reached number 25 on the weekly German Conservative Pop Airplay Chart on 21 March 2025. Two and a half months later, "Sorry Sorry" followed as the fifth single on 11 April 2025, a single in which Mai wonders whether infatuation can develop into something more. On 27 June 2025, "100% verliebt" (100% in Love) was released, a song about love at first sight. After its predecessor, Sorry Sorry, failed to chart, 100% verliebt reached number six on the weekly German Conservative Pop Airplay Charts on 22 August 2025. Two months later, "Für mich bist du Liebe", the penultimate single from Traumfabrik, was released on 22 August 2025, followed four weeks later by "Küss mich wach", the final single from Traumfabrik, on 19 September 2025. The two love songs about closeness, reliability, and magical moments, were not commercially successful.

While official music videos were filmed for the singles Himbeerrot (One Kiss), Schneemann, and Sorry Sorry, only lyric videos were released for the remaining five singles. In addition to the photographs for the album cover and the accompanying booklet, Sandra Ludewig also directed the music video for Himbeerrot (One Kiss). The music video for Schneemann was directed by Arne Hemmer, and the one for Sorry Sorry was directed by Kalle Hildinger. Furthermore, a video for the title track was released on the day of the album's release. This was also directed by Hildinger.

== Contributors ==
Album production

- Chris Cronauer: Guitar (Song 6), Composition (Songs: 1–12), Lyrics (Songs: 1–12), Music Production (Songs: 1–13)
- Daniel Cronauer: Composition (Songs: 2, 5–12), Lyrics (Songs: 2, 5–12), Music Production (Songs: 6, 13)
- Sia Furler: Composition (Song 13), Lyrics (Song 13)
- Greg Kurstin: Composition (Song 13), Lyrics (Song 13)
- Vanessa Mai: Vocals (Songs: 1–13), Composition (Songs: 1–12), Lyrics (Songs: 1–12)
- Mixcube: Mastering (Songs: 1–5, 7–13)
- Elżbieta Steinmetz: Composition (Song 10), Lyrics (Song 10)
- Matthias Zürkler (B-Case): Audio mixing (songs 1–13), Composition (songs 1–12), Lyrics (songs 1–12), Mastering (song 6), Music production (songs 1–13), Drums (song 6)

Visuals (Cover)

- Sandra Ludewig: Photographer

Publishing

- AFM Publishing: Music publisher (Songs: 1–12)
- Budde Music Publishing: Music publisher (Songs: 1–12)
- Edition Djorkaeff Beatzarre: music publisher (songs: 1–12)
- Edition Elan: Music Publisher (Song 10)
- Edition Teamscore: Music Publisher (Songs: 1–12)
- Edition Vanessa Mai: Music Publisher (Songs: 1–12)
- Fisherman Songs: Music Publisher (Songs: 1–12)
- Warner Music Group: Music label (songs: 1–13), distribution (songs: 1–13)

== Reception ==
Stephan Imming of the Schlagerprofis believes that "Von London nach New York" akes you on an emotional journey. Carried by a light, airy, "tropical-inspired" production, the song chases away any winter blues. In "Sorry Sorry", Vanessa Mai once again demonstrates her versatility, returning to the Schlager genre and delivering Wolkenfrei vibes.

Kevin Drewes of the online magazine Schlagerpuls characterized "100% verliebt" (100% in Love) as the soundtrack for summer: "light-footed, euphoric, and charged with exactly the exhilaration that comes when your heart suddenly develops a life of its own." He described the song as pure endorphin release in pop-schlager form, a driving love song that oscillates between daydream and dance floor and is instantly catchy. He further described "Sorry Sorry" as the perfect soundtrack for endless days and nights spent dancing. The song is full of lightness, dolce vita, and heart palpitations—the perfect companion for unforgettable summer moments. There is hardly anything better than the feeling of summer, which Mai captures with playful ease. He described "Für mich bist du Liebe" (For Me You Are Love) as emotional, intimate, and powerful, and in its opening lines paints a picture of a supportive relationship. A love that catches without smothering. That grants freedom without creating distance. In the chorus, the feeling intensifies into certainty: "For me you are peace / And no, I can never get enough of you." Mai doesn't speak of a fleeting high, but of a person who has become like a home; through shared highs and lows. A song like an inner compass. Musically, the singer underscores this depth with great feeling in her voice – compelling, but never overwrought. The piece is carried by a minimalist piano melody, which, together with gentle guitar, strings, and a distinctive drumbeat, coalesces into an elegant, catchy production.

Felix Goth of Eventim commented that Vanessa Mai proves once again that she has long been one of the most distinctive voices in German pop. The album feels like a daydream: "light, playful, but with depth". Traumfabrik combines modern pop production, danceable grooves, and soulful ballads. The title track tells of a love beyond the everyday, carried by euphoric pop brilliance. The pre-release singles Himbeerrot (One Kiss), Für mich bist du Liebe, Sorry Sorry, and Lobby have already garnered over 20 million streams and clearly indicate the direction the album is taking: "towards more freedom, emotion, and self-definition." With Traumfabrik, Mai invites her audience to immerse themselves in her world – between pop fantasy and lived reality.

Philipp Kause of laut.de gave Traumfabrik two out of five stars. According to him, the album contains "assembly-line love songs," with kissing being a particularly prominent theme. For the most part, the dancefloor-oriented music occupies the narrow niche left between the party-pop of fellow artist Mia Julia, the aerobic pop of Catterfeld, and the bouncy earworms that Sarah Engels spins in Strong Girls Club. The album meanders aimlessly between the Eurodance déjà vu of Nimmerland and the sing-along anthem 100% verliebt. Keine deiner Worte plods along listlessly, blandly, and lamely. The plot offers less friction than a Rosamunde Pilcher novel. Sorry Sorry takes a detour into the disco genre with a scenario involving Italian ice cream and a Vespa ride. Mai uses youth slang in homeopathic doses ("everything's a bit nicer with you") and repeatedly lets autotune fail miserably, as in "Küss mich wach" (Kiss Me Awake) or "Von London nach New York" (From London to New York). At times, the album's lyrics are so repetitive, clichéd, and tedious that any effort seems to be missing. Musically, at least, the widespread lack of originality fits the overall picture. There's a great track among both the fast and the slower songs. The quieter "Schneemann" (Snowman) can't be denied either its catchy pop melody or the visual memorability of its lyrics. Most of the album's metaphors don't feel particularly visionary, but rather drowned in Adel Tawil-esque sentimentality. The album doesn't even come across as visionary in its form, especially since eight songs were already released as singles. The added value now lies more in creating something tangible, for example, quickly selling out box sets with pretty photos instead of pursuing a conceptual vision. The trance-house track "Lobby", with its 126 beats per minute, has been around for almost a year. It's a good, fast song – purely musically speaking; lyrically, there's room for improvement. The individual tracks, which don't form any kind of flow and were sometimes released every two weeks, give the impression of an assembly line in the dream factory is awaken. In summary, the album is mainly about kissing and being in love. Regarding self-reflection, it emerges that gratitude is important; a narrow finding, but okay. Instead of further development, however, it is noticeable that Traumfabrik is nothing more than a generic "collection of tracks" and collects them in the most boring way.

== Chart performance ==
Traumfabrik entered the German album charts at number eight on October 17, 2025, and remained there for one week. In the same chart week, it reached number one in the German Schlager charts. This meant that all of Mai's studio albums classified as Schlager (all except Matrix ) had also charted in the Schlager charts. It was her ninth number one album in the Schlager charts. Furthermore, the album reached number five in the German German-language album charts on 17 October 2025. In Austria, the album also entered the charts at number 20 on 17 October, and in Switzerland at number 39 two days later. In both countries, the album remained in the charts for only one week.

For Vanessa Mai, it is her eleventh album to chart in Germany, Austria and Switzerland. In Germany, it is her tenth consecutive Top 10 album, but their lowest charting album since "Endlos verliebt" the debut album of Wolkenfrei, which reached number 18 in February 2014.

Chart	Peak position
Austria (Ö3)	20
Germany (GfK)	8
Switzerland (IFPI)	39
