= Von London nach New York =

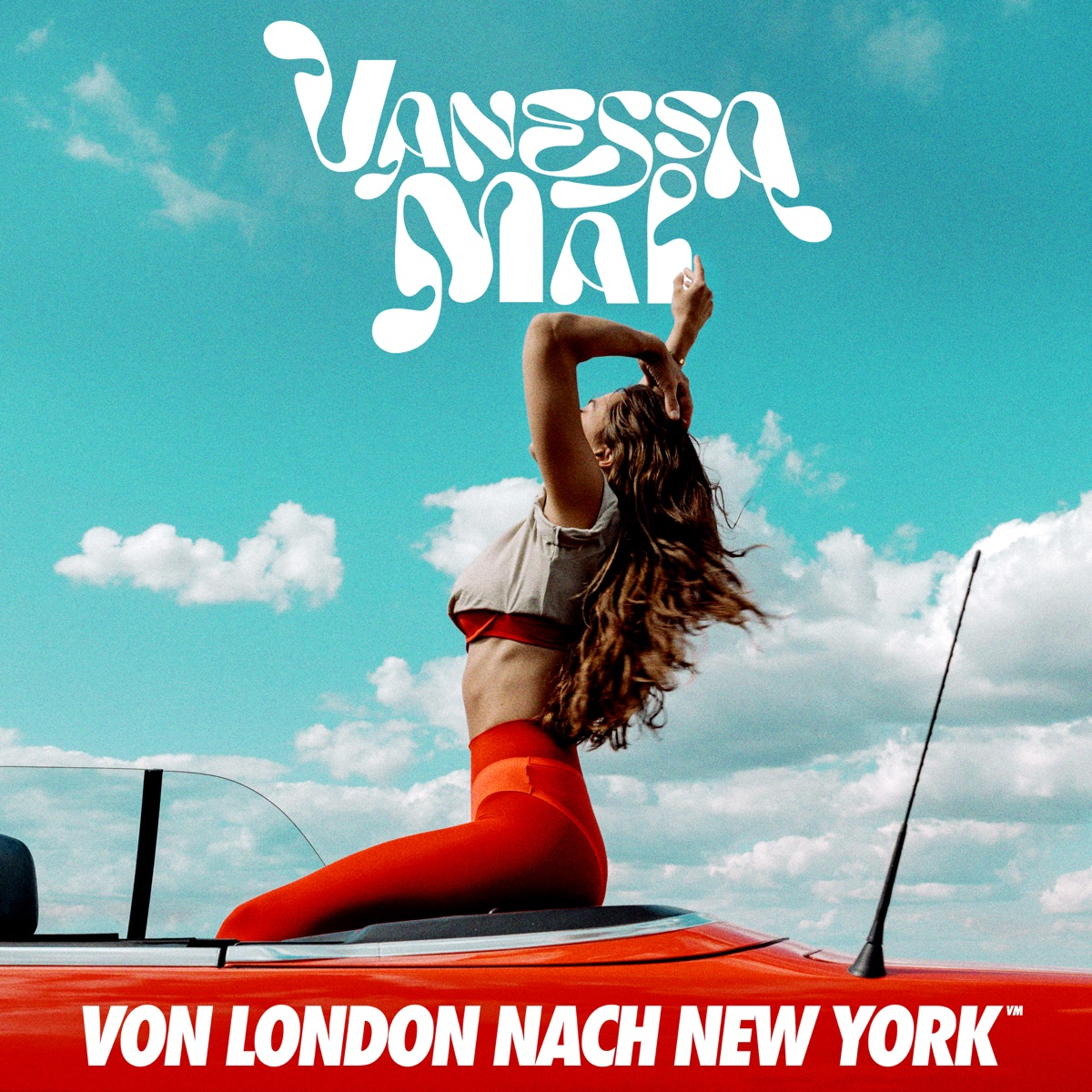

Single by Vanessa Mai

from the album Traumfabrik
- Language: German
- Released: 31 January 2025
- Genre: Pop, Schlager
- Length: 2:23

"Von London nach New York" (lit. 'From London to New York') is a song by German pop and Schlager singer Vanessa Mai, released on 31 January 2025. The track is the fourth single released from her eleventh studio album, "Traumfabrik".

== Origin and artwork ==
The song was written by the performer herself, together with co-writers Matthias Zürkler (B-Case) and brothers Chris and Daniel Cronauer. Co-writers B-Case and Christoph Cronauer were also responsible for the production. B-Case was also responsible for mixing the song.. Mastering was completed by the team at Mixcube Studio in Austria.

Vanessa Mai returned to her former songwriters and producers B-Case, Christoph Cronauer, and Daniel Cronauer for the production of her new album, following the release of two albums in the interim. All three previously worked with her between 2019 and 2022, often in joint roles. This collaboration resulted in the albums Für immer (January 2020), Mai Tai (March 2021), and Metamorphose (August 2022), which featured several singles, including the chart hit Melatonin (February 2022) and the earlier singles Himbeerrot (One Kiss) (September 2024), Lobby (November 2024).

The front cover of the single features Vanessa Mai – in addition to the song title and artist information – sitting on the back of a red convertible, looking slightly upwards and stretching her right arm towards the sky. She is wearing red leggings and a white top that has been rolled up at the waist, revealing parts of her red bra underneath. The image was taken during the filming of the music video for the single " Himbeerrot (One Kiss)", where she wears the same outfit. The photograph is by Leipzig-based photographer Sandra Ludewig, who has previously done several photoshoots with Mai.

== Publication and promotion ==
The first release of "Von London nach New York" was as a single on January 31, 2025. It was released as a digital single track for download and streaming by Warner Music. Warner Music also handled distribution, while the song was published by AFM Publishing, Budde Music Publishing, Edition Djorkaeff Beatzarre, Edition Teamscore, Edition Vanessa Mai and Fisherman Songs. Four weeks later, a "Dance Mix" was released as a digital single track on 28 February 2025. On 10 October 2025 of the same year, the song was released as the fourth single from Vanessa Mai's eleventh studio album, Traumfabrik (catalog number: 502173283272).

The first signs of a new release appeared at the end of 2024, when Mai herself presented a teaser in a year-end review. The release was first announced on 27 January 2025, when Mai herself uploaded a social media story with the comment "New song," revealing the title and release date. To promote the song, she performed live during prime time on ZDF's Giovanni Zarrella Show on 15 February 2025.

== Composition ==
Von London nach New York, Babe, ich folge dir an jeden Ort. Sag nur ein Wort und ich bleib’, du bist überall meine Eins. Lass nach London und New York, mit dir bin ich so wie neugebor’n. Deine Augen, deine Signs, du bist überall meine Eins. — Refrain, original excerpt	The lyrics to "Von London nach New York" are written in German, but contain several Anglicisms, such as "Babe" and "Signs" in the chorus. The verses themselves contain the Anglicisms "No Problems" and "Special Thing" . The music and lyrics were composed and written jointly by B-Case, Christoph and Daniel Cronauer, and Vanessa Mai in C-sharp minor at 110 beats per minute, the song falls within the realms of pop music and Schlager music, with use of Autotune.

Thematically, "Von London nach New York " is about "traveling with loved ones"; Vanessa Mai herself described it as follows: "I simply enjoy the song immensely. I love the feeling of traveling with loved ones, and most of all, I travel with my husband Andreas. We are a really great team, and the song perfectly captures this feeling".

The song is structured with two verses, a chorus, and an outro. It begins with the first verse, which is written as a six-line verse. This is followed by the so-called pre-chorus with its four lines, before the actual chorus begins. The chorus is written as an eight-line verse, consisting of a repeating four-line verse. The same structure is repeated in the second verse, although the second chorus is presented in a shortened version. This is followed by the outro, with which the song ends, simply repeating the final line of the chorus, "You are everywhere my one," twice. In addition to the main vocals by Mai, the voice of Christoph Cronauer can be heard in the background.

== Contributors ==
Song production: Christoph Cronauer: backing vocals, composition, lyrics, music production; Daniel Cronauer: Composition, Lyrics; Vanessa Mai: vocals, composition, lyrics; Mixcube Studio: Mastering; Matthias Zürkler (B-Case): Mixing, composition, lyrics, music production; Visualization: Sandra Ludewig: Photography	Productuion: AFM Publishing: Music Publisher; Budde Music Publishing: Music Publisher; Edition Djorkaeff Beatzarre: music publisher; Edition Teamscore: Music Publisher; Edition Vanessa Mai: Music Publisher; Fisherman Songs: Music Publisher; Warner Music: Music label, distributor

== Reception ==
Philipp Kause of laut.de gave the album Traumfabrik two out of five stars. During his review, he concluded that Mai misused Autotune several times on the album, including in Küss mich wach and Von London nach New York.

The online editorial team of the daily entertainment magazine Schmusa rated "Von London nach New York " (From London to New York) as "worth listening to." With this release, the singer remains true to her style: "She is authentic, versatile, and refuses to be pigeonholed into a rigid image." The song is the perfect blend of catchy pop and modern Schlager elements. Musically, it exudes a refreshing lightness. The melody is instantly memorable and takes listeners on a journey through vibrant metropolises. The title itself sounds almost like an anthem of freedom, perfectly in line with Mai's own message: "not to be bent out of shape and to follow your own path – both on stage and in life." With " Von London nach New York, " the singer once again makes a powerful statement: "She is not only one of Germany's most successful artists, but also one who understands how to constantly evolve without losing herself." Her music is a reflection of her personality – multifaceted, fearless, and full of energy.

Stephan Imming of the Schlagerprofis believes that the song takes you on an emotional journey. Carried by a light, airy, "tropical-inspired" production, " Von London nach New York" chases away any winter blues.

== Chart positions ==
"Von London nach New York" failed to enter the singles charts, but reached number 25 on the weekly German airplay chart on 21 March 2025.
