= Sestain =

Six-line poem format

A sestain is a six-line poem or repetitive unit of a poem of this format (musaddas), comparable to quatrain (Ruba'i in Persian and Arabic) which is a four-line poem or a unit of a poem. There are many types of sestain with different rhyme schemes, for example $\mathrm{AABBCC}$, $\mathrm{ABABCC}$, $\mathrm{AABCCB}$ or$\mathrm{AAABAB}$. The sestain is probably next in popularity to the quatrain in European literature. Usually there are three rhymes in the six-line strophe, but sometimes there are only two.

== AABBCC ==
I sprang to the stirrup, and Joris, and he;
I gallop'd, Dirck gallop'd, we gallop'd all three;
"Good speed !" cried the watch, as the gate-bolts undrew;
"Speed!" echoed the wall to us galloping through;
Behind shut the postern, the lights sank to rest,
And into the midnight we gallop'd abreast.

(Robert Browning, How They Brought the Good News from Ghent to Aix, 1-6)

The AABBCC is the simplest rhyme-scheme of the sestain. It was very popular in Old Polish poetry.

== ABABCC ==
Even as the sun with purple-colour'd face
Had ta'en his last leave of the weeping morn,
Rose-cheek'd Adonis hied him to the chase;
Hunting he loved, but love he laugh'd to scorn;
Sick-thoughted Venus makes amain unto him,
And like a bold-faced suitor 'gins to woo him.

(William Shakespeare, Venus and Adonis, 1-6)

The $\mathrm{ABABCC}$ rhyme-scheme is one of the most important forms in European poetry. It can be found in Thomas Campion's and Emma Lazarus's poetry. Juliusz Słowacki wrote his poem A Voyage to the Holy Land from Naples with the famous The Tomb of Agamemnon in $\mathrm{ABABCC}$ stanzas.

== ABCCBA ==
The grey sea and the long black land;
And the yellow half-moon large and low;
And the startled little waves that leap
In fiery ringlets from their sleep,
As I gain the cove with pushing prow,
And quench its speed i' the slushy sand.

(Robert Browning, Meeting at Night, 1-6)

It was probably borrowed from the Italian sonnet rhymed sometimes $\mathrm{ABBAABBA \,\, CDEEDC}$.

== ABBAAB ==
As when a sick man very near to death
Seems dead indeed, and feels begin and end
The tears and takes the farewell of each friend,
And hears one bid the other go, draw breath
Freelier outside, ("since all is o'er," he saith,
"And the blow fallen no grieving can amend;"):

(Robert Browning, Childe Roland to the Dark Tower Came, 25-30)

== ABABAB ==
She walks in beauty, like the night
Of cloudless climes and starry skies;
And all that's best of dark and bright
Meet in her aspect and her eyes;
Thus mellowed to that tender light
Which heaven to gaudy day denies.

(Lord Byron, She walks in Beauty, 1-6)

== AABCCB ==
Les sanglots longs
Des violons
De l'automne
Blessent mon coeur
D'une langueur
Monotone.

(Paul Verlaine, Chanson d'automne, 1-6)

This rhyme scheme was extremely popular in French poetry. It was used by Victor Hugo and Charles Leconte de Lisle. In English it is called the tail-rhyme stanza. Bob Dylan uses it in several songs, including the A-strains of You're Gonna Make Me Lonesome When You Go and the B-strains of Key West (Philosopher Pirate). Rubén Dario and many Modernismo poets used rhyme scheme as well.

== AAABAB ==
But Mousie, thou art no thy-lane,
In proving foresight may be vain
The best laid schemes o' Mice an' Men
Gang aft agley,
An' lea'e us nought but grief an' pain,
For promis'd joy!

(Robert Burns, To a Mouse, 37-42)

It is Burns's stanza.

== ABCABC ==
While that my soul repairs to her devotion,
Here I intombe my flesh,1 that it betimes
May take acquaintance of this heap of dust;
To which the blast of deaths incessant motion,
Fed with the exhalation of our crimes,
Drives all at last. Therefore I gladly trust

(George Herbert, Church-monuments, 1-6)
