= Wolkenfrei =

- Also known as: Marc-Fischer-Band (1999–2011)
- Origin: Aspach, Baden-Württemberg, Germany
- Genres: Schlager
- Years active: 1999–2016. 2023-Present
- Label: Ariola
- Past members: Marc Fischer (1999–2015); Stefan Kinski (1999–2015); Heike Wanner (1999–2012); Vanessa Mai (2012–2016, 2022-Present)

Wolkenfrei (English: "Cloudless") is a German schlager band from Aspach. Founded in 1999 under the name Marc-Fischer-Band, which remained in use until 2011, it consisted solely of lead singer Vanessa Mai from 2015 on. In 2016, Mai abandoned the name Wolkenfrei to launch a solo career under her own name. Wolkenfrei was revived in late 2022, while the first song of the new revived Wolkenfrei, "Uns gehört die Welt", was released in early 2023. The first album of the revived Wolkenfrei will be "Hotel Tropicana", to be released in 2023.

== History ==
=== 1999–2012: Before Vanessa Mai ===
In 1999, Marc Fischer and Stefan Kinski met during a ski trip. Both had had previous experiences as musicians: Fischer with schlager covers and an Elvis show, Kinski with rock and jazz. They founded the Marc-Fischer-Band with singer Heike Wanner and completed several concerts in the following years. In 2011, the band was renamed to Wolkenfrei (English: "Cloudless"). In the summer of 2012, Wanner left the band for health reasons. While attending a concert of her father's band Musik-Express at the Sonnenhof in Aspach, Vanessa Mai was enlisted as a singer by Fischer.

=== 2012–2015: First studio recordings ===
Wolkenfrei released their début single "Jeans, T-Shirts und Freiheit" (English: "Jeans, T-Shirts, and freedom") on July 19, 2013. On November 20, 2013, they were given a smago! Award for Hit-Tipp 2014, before they had released a full-length album. On January 4, 2014, they released their second single "Du bist meine Insel" (English: "You Are My Island"), which was followed on February 7 by their début studio album Endlos verliebt (English: "Endlessly in Love"). The album, which charted in Germany, Austria, and Switzerland, was produced by Felix Gauder, who had previously worked with Sandra, Bad Boys Blue, Jimmy Somerville, E-Rotic, and the Pet Shop Boys. On June 6, the band released their third single "Ich versprech dir nichts und geb dir alles" (English: "I Promise You Nothing and Give You Everything"). On August 8, they organised the first Wolkenfrei Sommerparty in their home town of Aspach. On August 29, they released their fourth single "Champs-Élysées".

=== 2015–2016: Departure of the founding members and end of the band ===
The last single to be released from Wolkenfrei's début album was "Der Zaubertrank ist leer" (English: "The Magic Potion Is Empty") and was followed by the announcement of the band's second studio album. In April 2015, founding members Marc Fischer and Stefan Kinski announced that they were leaving Wolkenfrei, leading to the project being represented only by Mai (mostly as "Wolkenfrei-Star Vanessa Mai"). Kinski wanted to dedicate himself to his family and his civil job, while Fischer would serve as musical adviser and tour manager from then on. "Wolke 7", the first single from Wolkenfrei's second studio album, was released on May 22. The album, titled Wachgeküsst, was released on July 10. A day before, Deutsches Musik Fernsehen had dedicated a 65-minute television special to Mai and to the album. Due to Mai's extensive television presence, including an appearance on Florian Silbereisen's ARD show Die Besten im Sommer with the song "Wolke 7", the album reached place 7 of the German albums chart and also charted in Austria and Switzerland. The single "Wolke 7" reached place 54 in Germany and 71 in Austria. On September 18, "Wachgeküsst", the album's title track, was released as its second single. On October 9, Wolkenfrei's first live album Wachgeküsst (Live), was released. The last single "In all deinen Farben" (English: "In All Your Colours") was released on December 11, followed a week later by a non-album Christmas single titled "Ein Engel in der Weihnachtszeit" (English: "An Angel at Christmas Time"). In February 2016, Mai announced her decision to stop using the stage name Wolkenfrei and to perform under her own name.

=== 2022-Present: Revival of the Wolkenfrei as a Band/Artist Name ===
The band name "Wolkenfrei" has seen a revival by Vanessa Mai, in mid to late 2022, with the activation and the highlight of the Instagram page "Wolkenfrei.Official", before other updates about the revival were announced. The first song released under the revived band name of Wolkenfrei in 2023 was titled "Uns gehört die Welt", meaning "The World is Ours". It will be a part of a new album called "Hotel Tropicana", to be fully released in early 2023.

== Discography ==
- 2014 - Endlos verliebt
- 2015 - Wachgeküsst
- 2023 - Hotel Tropicana

== Television specials ==
- 2015 - Wolkenfrei Wolke 7 – Das TV-Spezial (Broadcaster: Deutsches Musik Fernsehen. Length: 65 minutes. Moderator: Ingo Blenn)
