= Lobby (Vanessa Mai song) =

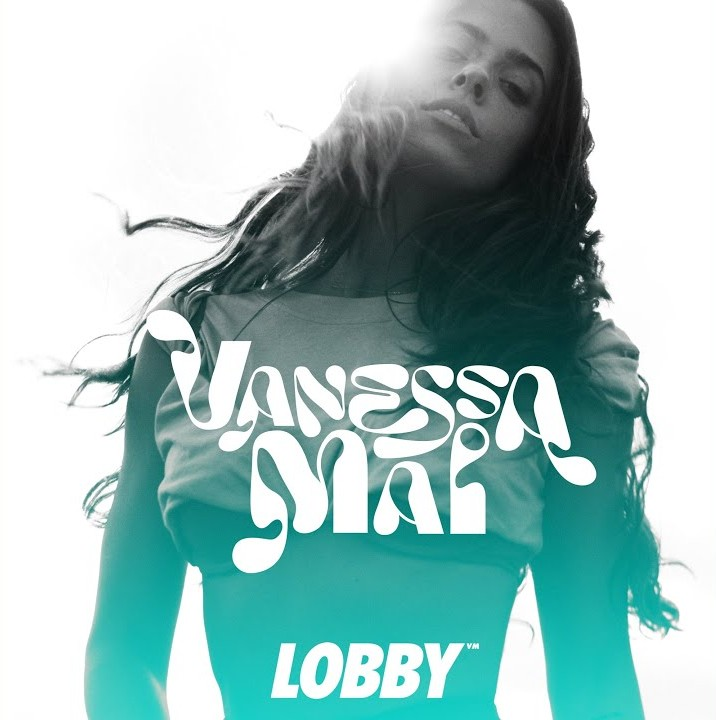

Single by Vanessa Mai

from the album Traumfabrik
- Language: German
- Released: 1 November 2024
- Genre: Dance, pop, schlager
- Length: 2:42
- Songwriters: Christoph Cronauer, Daniel Cronauer, Vanessa Mai, Elżbieta Steinmetz, Matthias Zürkler
- Producers: Christoph Cronauer, Matthias Zürkler

"Lobby" is a song by German pop and Schlager singer Vanessa Mai, released on 22 August 2025. The track is the second single released from her eleventh studio album, "Traumfabrik".

== Origin and artwork ==
The song was written by the performer herself, together with co-writers Elżbieta Steinmetz (Ela) and Matthias Zürkler (B-Case), as well as brothers Chris and Daniel Cronauer. Co-writers B-Case and Christoph Cronauer were also responsible for the production B-Case was also responsible for mixing the song. Mastering was done by the team at Mixcube Studio in Austria.

Vanessa Mai returned to her former songwriters and producers B-Case, Christoph Cronauer, and Daniel Cronauer for the production of her new album, following the release of two albums in the interim. All three previously worked with her between 2019 and 2022, often in joint roles. This collaboration resulted in the albums Für immer (January 2020), Mai Tai (March 2021), and Metamorphose (August 2022), which featured several singles, including the chart hit Melatonin (February 2022) and the earlier singles Himbeerrot (One Kiss) (September 2024). This marked Mai's first collaboration with Ela.

The front cover of the single, which is mostly black and white, features Vanessa Mai alongside the song title and artist information. She is wearing a white top that has been rolled up high at the stomach, revealing parts of her bra underneath. The image shows her from the hips up, facing forward, with her head tilted slightly to the left and back, looking towards the viewer. The photo was taken during the filming of the music video for the single "Himbeerrot (One Kiss)", where she wears the same outfit. The photograph is by Leipzig-based photographer Sandra Ludewig, who has previously done several photoshoots with Mai.

== Publication and promotion ==
The song "Lobby" was initially released as a single on 1 November 2024. It was released as a digital single track for download and streaming by Warner Music. Warner Music also handled distribution, the song was published by AFM Publishing, Budde Music Publishing, Edition Djorkaeff Beatzarre, Edition Elan, Edition Teamscore, Edition Vanessa Mai, and Fisherman Songs. The following year, on 10 October 2025, the song was released as the second single from Vanessa Mai's eleventh studio album, Traumfabrik (catalog number: 502173283272).

The first signs of a new release appeared on 25 October 2024, when Mai herself uploaded a video to social media saying, "I think we need another new song for the tour..." accompanied by the comment, "What's the name of the new single 🕵🏽‍♀️🔎👀". Two days later, she finally revealed the title and release date. To promote the song, a lyric video appeared on YouTube on the day of the single's release.

== Composition ==
| Wir starten in der Lobby, Tequila in der Story. Ich spüre all eyes on me, Vanille auf der Haut. Die Palmen wie in Long Beach und wenn du mich so ansiehst. Weiß ich, worauf du anspielst, komm, dreh die Nacht auf laut. — Refrain, original excerpt | The lyrics to "Lobby" are written in German, but contain several Anglicisms , such as "Story" ( English for "Geschichte," meaning "history") and "All Eyes on Me" (English for "All eyes on me") in the chorus. The verses themselves contain the Anglicisms "Baby" (English for "darling") and "Lipstick" (English for "lipstick"). The song title itself also originates from English and, according to the Duden dictionary, means "hotel lobby" or " vestibule" in German. The music and lyrics were composed and written jointly by B-Case, Christoph and Daniel Cronauer, and Ela and Vanessa Mai. Musically, the song falls within the realms of dance and pop music, stylistically within the pop-schlager genre, with house and trance elements. The tempo is 126 beats per minute. The key is F-sharp minor. |

The song title refers to a hotel lobby ("We start in the lobby") where "hot feelings" arise. The lyrics leave room for interpretation with lines like "Anything can happen, nobody knows us," “Lipstick on your tank top," or "Show me where this is going to lead." Vanessa Mai namechecks Long Beach, California in the chorus. According to the record label, it's a song that captures the magic of a new encounter. It's about the magic of the night and the intoxicating feeling that arises when the two come together—especially in a breathtakingly beautiful place, far removed from everyday life. Mai herself said that " Lobby" embodies the perfect "night-out feeling." It's that unique experience of going out to party with friends, feeling free, and simply having fun. Often, people resolve to finally go dancing again, but then it often remains just a resolution. She is lucky enough to perform regularly—for her, it feels like her own "girls' night out" every time. Lobby wonderfully expresses this feeling.

The song is structured with two verses and a chorus. It begins with the chorus, which is written as an eight-line verse and consists of a repeating four-line phrase. The chorus concludes with the post-chorus, which consists of four lines and simply repeats the line "In the lobby she never stops" three times, ending with the line "Don't stop, do it again." This is followed by the first verse, which also consists of four lines. The chorus then returns, beginning with a three-line pre-chorus and concluding once more with the post-chorus. The same structure is followed by the second verse, with the song ending after the subsequent chorus and its post-chorus.

== Contributors ==
| Song production: Christoph Cronauer: Composition, lyrics, music production; Daniel Cronauer: Composition, Lyrics; Vanessa Mai: vocals, composition, lyrics; Mixcube Studio: Mastering; Matthias Zürkler (B-Case): Mixing, composition, lyrics, music production; Visualization: Sandra Ludewig: Photographer | Production: AFM Publishing: Music Publisher; Budde Music Publishing: Music Publisher; Edition Djorkaeff Beatzarre: music publisher; Edition Teamscore: Music Publisher; Edition Vanessa Mai: Music Publisher; Fisherman Songs: Music Publisher; Warner Music Group: Music label, distribution |

== Reception ==
In the lead-up to the release, Mai garnered significant media attention with a post on her social media on 27 October 2024, announcing the single. The post was accompanied by a video showing the singer wearing a white, transparent top without a bra. Media coverage included headlines such as "Forbiddenly hot advertising" on News.de, "Nipple alert!" on Schlager.de, and "Not everyone is thrilled... She shows everything in the transparent top" in the Austrian newspaper Heute.

Philipp Kause of the online magazine laut.de gave the album Traumfabrik two out of five stars. During his review, he concluded that there was a great track among both the fast and the slower songs. Musically, the fast track was "Lobby ," while lyrically there was room for improvement..
