= Himbeerrot (One Kiss) =

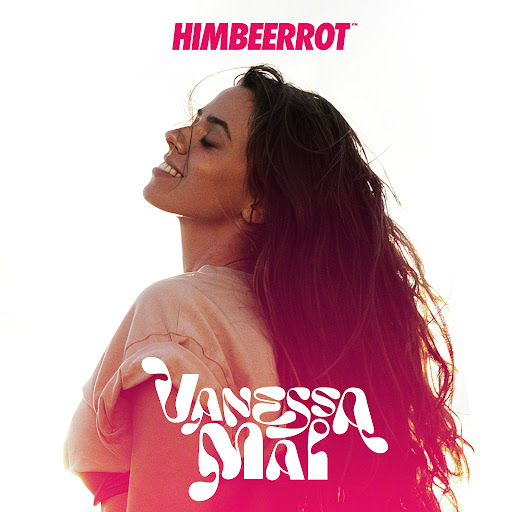

Single by Vanessa Mai

from the album Traumfabrik
- Language: German
- English title: Raspberry Red (One Kiss)
- Released: 6 September 2024
- Genre: Pop, Schlager
- Length: 2:31
- Songwriters: Christoph Cronauer, Vanessa Mai, Matthias Zürkler
- Producers: Christoph Cronauer, Matthias Zürkler

"Himbeerrot (One Kiss)" (lit. 'Raspberry Red (One Kiss)') is a song by German pop and Schlager singer Vanessa Mai, released on 6 September 2024. The track is the first single released from her eleventh studio album, "Traumfabrik".

== Origin and artwork ==
The song was written by the performer herself, together with co-writers Chris Cronauer and Matthias Zürkler (B-Case). The latter two were also responsible for the production. B-Case was also responsible for mixing the song. Mastering was done by the team at Mixcube Studio in Austria.

Vanessa Mai returns to her former songwriters and producers B-Case and Christoph Cronauer after releasing two albums in the interim. Both previously worked with her between 2019 and 2022, often jointly. This collaboration resulted in the albums Für immer (January 2020), Mai Tai (March 2021), and Metamorphose (August 2022), which featured several singles, including the chart hit Melatonin (February 2022).

The front cover of the single features Vanessa Mai, along with the song title and artist information. In the chest-high profile shot, she shows her left shoulder and tilts her face slightly upwards, smiling with her eyes closed. The image was taken during the filming of the accompanying music video, where she wears the same outfit. The photograph is by Leipzig-based photographer Sandra Ludewig, who has previously done several photoshoots with Mai.

== Publication and promotion ==
The first release of "Himbeerrot (One Kiss)" was as a single on September 6, 2024. It was released as a digital single track for download and streaming by Warner Music. Warner Music was also responsible for distribution, the song was published by AFM Publishing, Budde Music Publishing, Edition Djorkaeff Beatzarre, Edition Elan, Edition Teamscore, Edition Vanessa Mai, and Fisherman Songs. A "Dance Mix" was released as a digital single track on 18 October 2024. The following year, the song was released as the first single from Vanessa Mai's eleventh studio album, Traumfabrik (catalog number: 502173283272), on 10 October 2025.

The first signs of a new release appeared on 7 August 2024, when it was announced that an event would take place on 6 September 2024 at the Bergwerk Hotel Sonnenhof in Aspach (bei Backnang). Four days later, it was revealed that it was a single with a release party. At that point, the song's title could be deduced via Spotify. Mai herself first announced the single via her social media on 15 August 2024. A day later, she finally revealed the song title "Himbeerrot (One Kiss)". That same evening, she presented a longer teaser at the Da Capo! Open Air im Schlosshof Alzey. From 24 August 2024, the track was available as a pre-save, which also unlocked a "Behind-the-Scenes" video of the music video. On the day of its single release, Himbeerrot (One Kiss) was promoted by Amazon Music, Apple Music, Deezer, and Spotify, with it being the cover art of their Schlager playlists. In addition, there were several live performances during prime time on ARD, including on 19 October 2024, during Schlagerbooom 2024 – Alles funkelt! Alles glitzert! on Silvester-Schlagerbooom 2025 – Wunderlichtershow! on 31 December 2024. She performed the song on Schlagerchampions on 11 January 2025.

== Background ==
For Vanessa Mai, the release of "Himbeerrot (One Kiss)" represents a musical restart. Just a few days earlier, it was announced that she was switching to the record label Warner Music thus ending her partnership with Ariola, with whom she had worked for over ten years and enjoyed commercial success, including nine Top 10 albums in Deutsche Albumcharts and two number-one albums with Regenbogen (August 2017) and Schlager (August 2018). Mai herself commented on the move with the words:

“I’m incredibly happy to be starting a new chapter in my musical journey with Warner Music. It was crucial for me to find a label that understands my vision and gives me the space to express myself creatively and constantly reinvent myself. With the Warner Music team, I’ve found exactly the partner who will support me on this path.”

– Vanessa May, September 2024

With "Himbeerrot (One Kiss)", Mai released her first self-penned track in two years; the last time she did so was on the album Metamorphose. In the interim, she released two albums without any songwriting contributions: Hotel Tropicana (March 2023 as Wolkenfrei) and Matrix (May 2024). Furthermore, she returned to her former songwriters and producers, explaining in an interview with Radio Melody that she had reflected on the past few years and realized that this was "Vanessa Mai," that she enjoyed working with this group, that it felt right, and that she felt the results of this collaboration resonated most with her fans.

== Composition ==
Komm, les’ meine Lippen, sie glänzen rot. Und wispеrn: „Baby, ich will dich von hier bis zum Mond“. Wir zwei vor den Klippеn, one Kiss im Segelboot. Leg deine Hand auf mein’n Rücken, lass mich nie mehr los. Berühr jetzt meine Lippen, sie glänzen Himbeerrot. Und wispern: „Baby, ich will dich von hier bis zum Mond“. Wir zwei vor den Klippen, one Kiss im Segelboot. Leg deine Hand auf mein’n Rücken, lass mich nie mehr los. — Refrain, original excerpt	The lyrics to "Himbeerrot (One Kiss)" are in German , with the exception of the parenthetical phrase "One Kiss" (English for "Einen Kuss") and the line "Babe, I am Yours" (English for "Liebling, ich gehöre dir"). In an interview, Mai was asked about the parenthetical phrase and why only "Einen Kuss," to which Mai replied that it should be appreciated. The music and lyrics were composed and written jointly by B-Case, Christoph Cronauer, and Vanessa Mai. Musically and stylistically, the song falls within the realms of pop music and Schlager music. The tempo is 120 beats per minute. The key is C-sharp minor. Thematically, "Himbeerrot (One Kiss)" is a love song in which Mai sings about a special kiss. She sings of a night on the beach (“Crystal blue ocean, let’s go”), endless love (“Put your hand on my back, never let me go”), and how even the shortest periods of time apart feel like an eternity (“It feels like I’ve waited 100,000 years for you because you were gone for a second”). The chorus is mainly about physical intimacy. With lines like “Come, read my lips, they shine red” and “Touch my lips now, they shine raspberry red,” she describes her desire for physical intimacy, which she hopes will lead to more than just kissing (“Baby, I want you from here to the moon”), as the preceding pre-chorus also suggests: “All night long, babe, I am yours. Less talking, because silence is golden”. According to the label, the song reflects “lightness, love, and longing”. Mai herself described it as a late-summer song intended to spread good cheer and create positive feelings, and whose lyrics are meant to evoke beautiful images.

The song is structured with two verses, a chorus, and an outro. It begins with the first verse, which is written as a four-line stanza. This is followed by the pre-chorus, also consisting of four lines, before the actual chorus begins. The chorus is an eight-line stanza, made up of two very similar four-line stanzas. While lines two through four are simply repeated, the first lines are slightly different. The same structure is repeated in the second verse. The song ends after the second chorus with the outro, which simply repeats the last chorus phrase, "I'll never let you go," with an added "Oh-oh-oh-oh".

== Music video ==
The music video premiered on 6 September 2024, on the video platform YouTube. It features Vanessa Mai singing the song in three different scenes. In one scene, she stands in front of a microphone, wearing a relatively revealing outfit, with a red filter applied to the image. The second scene shows her in front of, or driving in, a red BMW convertible. A third scene shows her in a bright room with two CRT televisions on the floor, in front of which she poses and films herself with a digital camera in a home video style. While driving in the car, she opens the glove compartment and takes out a perfume, which she sprays on herself. At the end of the video, it is revealed that the brand is "Maiscent." After years of working as Vanessa Mai's photographer, Sandra Ludewig directed one of her videos for the first time. The video has a total running time of 2 minutes and 33 seconds. By October 2025, the video had received over 1.5 million views on YouTube.

== Contributors ==
Song production: Christoph Cronauer: Composition, lyrics, music production; Vanessa Mai: vocals, composition, lyrics; Mixcube Studio: Mastering; Matthias Zürkler (B-Case): Mixing, composition, lyrics, music production; Production: AFM Publishing: Music Publisher; Budde Music Publishing: Music Publisher; Edition Djorkaeff Beatzarre: music publisher; Edition Teamscore: Music Publisher; Edition Vanessa Mai: Music Publisher; Fisherman Songs: Music Publisher; Warner Music Group: Music label, distribution	Visualization (Cover): Sandra Ludewig: Photography; Music video: Roland Claus: Driver; Lennart Fränkel: color correction; Grit Hildenbrand: Hairstyle, Makeup; Kalle Hildinger: Assistant Director; Marc van Hoorn: Camera; Sarah Sharon Karsten: Styling; Debbie Linne: Cut; Sandra Ludewig: Film production , directing; Malte Niessen: Camera Assistant; Nico Nitsche: Overhead lighting

== Reception ==
The news agency spot on news reported that Mai's song "Raspberry Red" (One Kiss) evokes summery feelings once again.

Mirco Clapier of Deine Schlagerwelt described Himbeerrot (One Kiss) as a fresh pop hit for the heart. He said that Mai once again sets a sign for change and self-determination. With her unmistakable blend of pop and Schlager, she remains true to herself while simultaneously exploring new musical paths. It embodies the characteristic sound for which Mai is known: "lightness, love, and longing." The song draws on her Schlager roots but is more modern and features a fresh pop sound that is instantly catchy. Here, too, Mai manages to preserve the essence of her music while giving her style a contemporary touch. Mai demonstrates once again why she is one of Germany's most important pop and Schlager artists: "She combines the old with the new, remains authentic, and yet always surprises with new facets. A must-have for everyone who loves modern Schlager!"

== Chart positions ==
"Himbeerrot (One Kiss)" failed to enter the singles charts, but reached number 18 on the weekly German airplay chart on 11 October 2024. In September 2024 it reached number 41 on the monthly Conservative Pop Airplay chart and number 19 the following month.
