= The Masked Singer Switzerland =

Swiss television series

- Starring: Steffi Buchli (1); Luca Hänni (1-2); Christa Rigozzi (2); Various guests
- Hosted by: Alexandra Maurer (1); Anna Maier (2)
- No. of contestants: 32
- No. of episodes: 24

Release
- Original network: ProSieben Schweiz
- Original release: 13 November 2020 – present

The Masked Singer Switzerland is a Swiss reality singing competition television series adapted from the South Korean format King of Mask Singer. The first season premiered on ProSieben Schweiz on 13 November 2020, and is hosted by Alexandra Maurer. The show features celebrities singing in head-to-toe costumes and face masks which conceal their identities from other contestants, panelists, and an audience. The second season premiered on 10 November 2021 and was hosted by Anna Maier along with former guest panelist of season 1, Christa Rigozzi replacing Steffi Buchli on the judging panel. The third season premiered on 12 October 2022. The fourth season premiered on 15 November 2023.

== Panelists and host ==
Season 2 panelists and host

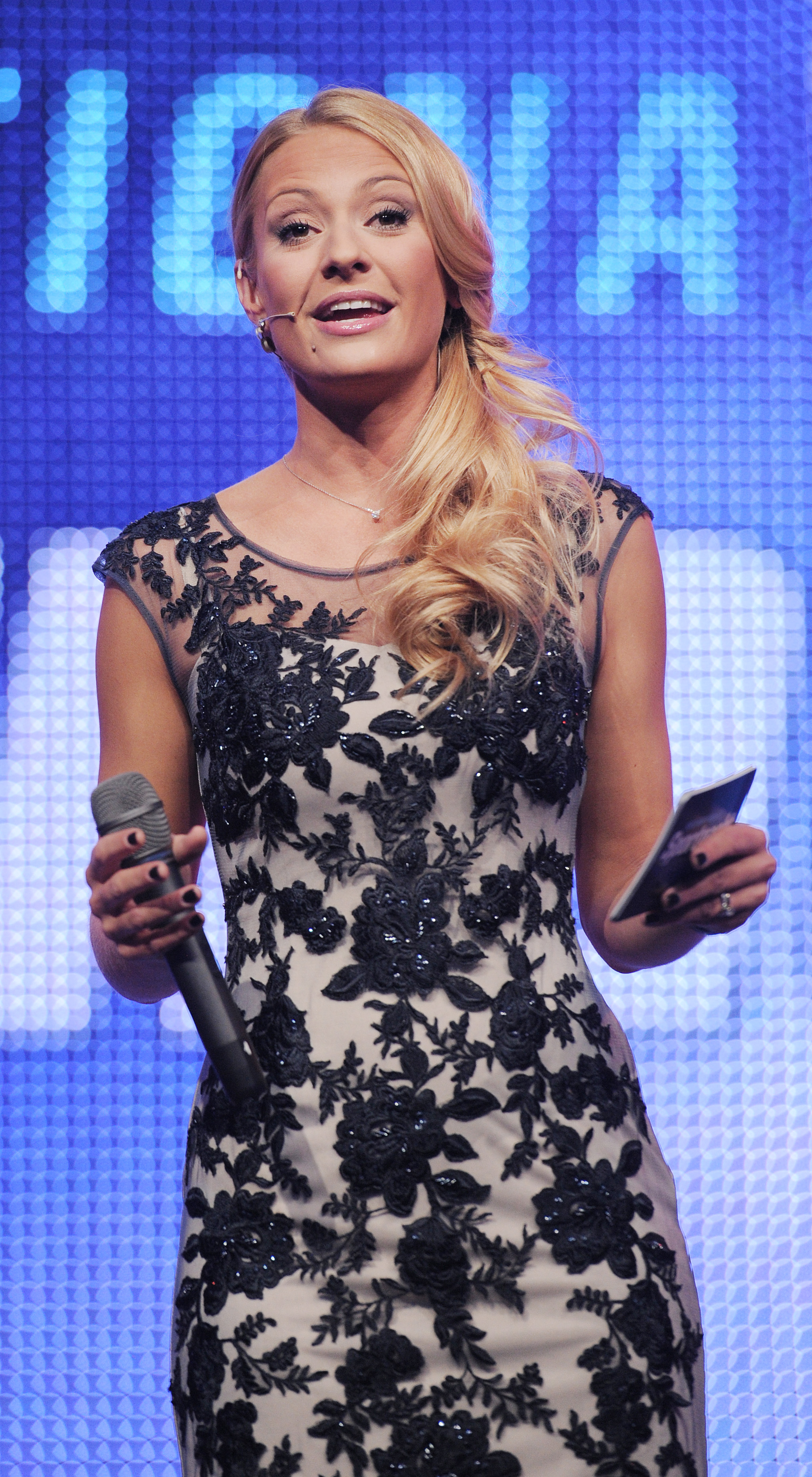
Christa Rigozzi

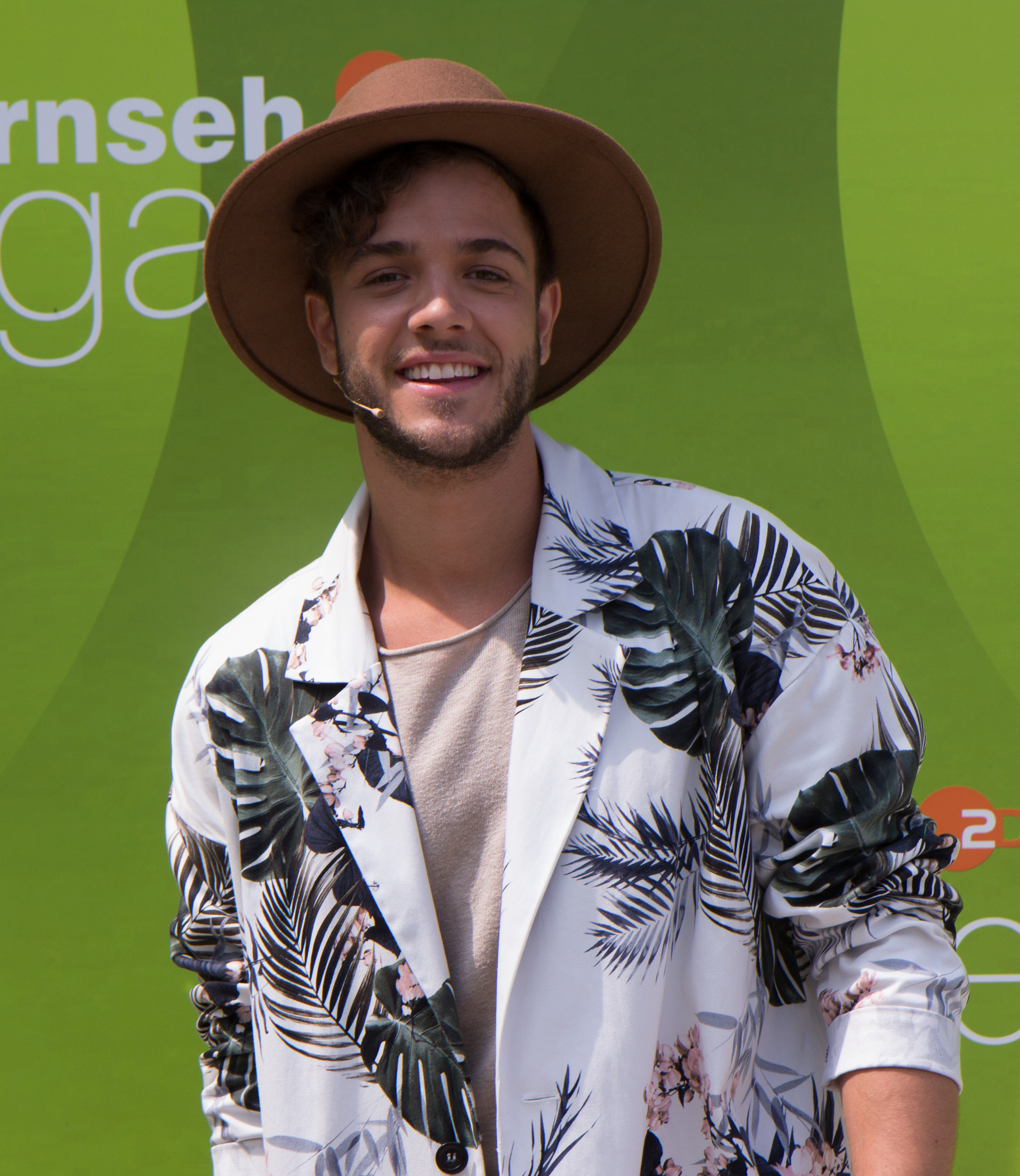
Luca Hänni

Anna Maier

=== Guest panelists ===
Throughout the season, various guest judges appeared alongside Steffi Buchli and Luca Hänni as the third member of the judging panel, for one episode in the first seasons. The same applies for the second season as well except with Christa Rigozzi joining in place of Steffi Buchli.

These guest panelists have included:

Episode	Name	Notability
1	Marc Sway	Singer
2	Stéphanie Berger	Model, Singer & Actress
3	Bligg	Musician
4	Christa Rigozzi	Model & Actress
5	Loco Escrito	Musician
6	Stefanie Heinzmann	Singer
1	Dominique Rinderknecht	Model

== Series overview ==
Series overview
Series	Celebrities	Episodes	Originally released		Winner	Runner-up	Third place
Series	Celebrities	Episodes	First released	Last released	Winner	Runner-up	Third place
1	8	6	13 November 2020	18 December 2020	Baschi as “Murmeltier"	Arnold Forrer as "Seegott"	Elaine as "Fuchs"
2	8	6	10 November 2021	15 December 2021	Ritschi as "Mammut"	Sandra Studer as "Pfau"	Walter Andreas Müller as "Pinguin"
3	8	6	12 October 2022	16 November 2022	Joey Heindle as "Tukan"	Maja Brunner as "Siebenschläfer"	Michael von der Heide as "Robi"
4	8	6	15 November 2023	20 December 2023	Remo Forrer as "Orca"	Jonathan Schächter as "Nessi"	Patric Scott as "Rübli"

== Season 1 ==
Stage name	Celebrity	Notability	Episodes						
Stage name	Celebrity	Notability	1	2	3	4	5	6	
Stage name	Celebrity	Notability	1	2	3	4	5	A	B
Murmeltier "Marmot"	Baschi	Singer	WIN	WIN	WIN	RISK	WIN	RISK	WINNER
Seegott "Sea God"	Arnold Forrer	Wrestler	WIN	WIN	RISK	RISK	RISK	WIN	RUNNER-UP
Fuchs "Fox"	Eliane	Singer	RISK	WIN	WIN	WIN	WIN	THIRD	
Bernhardiner "Saint Bernard"	Claudio Zuccolini	Host	WIN	RISK	WIN	WIN	OUT		
Igel "Hedgehog"	Florian Ast	Singer	WIN	RISK	RISK	OUT			
Eule "Owl"	Dominique Rinderknecht	Model	RISK	WIN	OUT				
Kuh "Cow"	Janosch Nietlispach	Influencer	RISK	OUT					
Gams "Chamois"	Denise Biellmann	Figure skater	OUT						

The masked singer won their face-off and remained in the competition.
The masked singer lost their face-off and was in the bottom three/two, but was not eliminated.
The masked singer was safe from elimination.
The masked singer was eliminated from the competition and unmasked upon their elimination.

Episodes

=== Week 1 (13 November) ===
Performances on the first episode
#	Stage name	Song	Identity	Result
1	Eule	"Get the Party Started" by Shirley Bassey	undisclosed	RISK
2	Murmeltier	"Swiss Lady" by Pepe Lienhard Band	undisclosed	WIN
3	Bernhardiner	"You've Got a Friend in Me" by Randy Newman	undisclosed	WIN
4	Gams	"Head Shoulders Knees & Toes" by Ofenbach & Quarterhead feat. Norma Jean Martine	Denise Biellmann	OUT
5	Seegott	"The Sound of Silence" by Disturbed	undisclosed	WIN
6	Fuchs	"Bad Romance" by Lady Gaga	undisclosed	RISK
7	Igel	"I Know You Want Me (Calle Ocho)" by Pitbull/"Somebody Dance with Me" by DJ BoBo	undisclosed	RISK
8	Kuh	"That's Amore" by Dean Martin	undisclosed	WIN

=== Week 2 (20 November) ===
Performances on the second episode
#	Stage name	Song	Identity	Result
1	Igel	"The Heavy Entertainment Show" by Robbie Williams	undisclosed	RISK
2	Fuchs	"Oops!... I Did It Again" by Britney Spears	undisclosed	WIN
3	Bernhardiner	"A Million Dreams" by Ziv Zaifman, Hugh Jackman & Michelle Williams	undisclosed	RISK
4	Murmeltier	"Let's Get Loud" by Jennifer Lopez	undisclosed	WIN
5	Eule	"California Dreamin'" by The Mamas and the Papas	undisclosed	WIN
6	Kuh	"Everybody (Backstreet's Back)" by Backstreet Boys/"In da Club" by 50 Cent	Janosch Nietlispach	OUT
7	Seegott	"Nothing Else Matters" by Metallica	undisclosed	WIN

=== Week 3 (27 November) ===
Performances on the third episode
#	Stage name	Song	Identity	Result
1	Eule	"Greased Lightnin'" by John Travolta	undisclosed	WIN
2	Murmeltier	"You Don't Own Me" by Lesley Gore	Dominique Rinderknecht	OUT
3	Bernhardiner	"Up in the Sky" by 77 Bombay Street	undisclosed	WIN
4	Igel	"Heaven" by Gotthard	undisclosed	RISK
5	Seegott	"Thunderstruck" by AC/DC	undisclosed	RISK
6	Fuchs	"Control" by Zoe Wees	undisclosed	WIN

=== Week 4 (4 December) ===
Performances on the fourth episode
#	Stage name	Song	Result	
1	Bernhardiner	"Jingle Bell Rock" by Bobby Helms/"Rockin' Around the Christmas Tree" by Brenda Lee	WIN	
2	Seegott	"You Raise Me Up" by Secret Garden	RISK	
3	Fuchs	"Just Like a Pill" by Pink	WIN	
4	Igel	"Shut Up and Dance" by Walk the Moon	RISK	
5	Murmeltier	"The Climb" by Miley Cyrus	RISK	
Sing-off details			Identity	Result
1	Seegott	"I Don't Want to Miss a Thing" by Aerosmith	undisclosed	SAFE
2	Igel	"She Got Me" by Luca Hänni	Florian Ast	OUT
3	Murmeltier	"Down on the Corner" by Creedence Clearwater Revival	undisclosed	SAFE

=== Week 5 (11 December) ===
Performances on the fifth episode
#	Stage name	Song	Result	
1	Fuchs	"Lady Marmalade" by Labelle	WIN	
2	Bernhardiner	"Hold My Girl" by George Ezra	RISK	
3	Murmeltier	"Baila morena" by Zucchero	WIN	
4	Seegott	"An Tagen wie diesen" by Die Toten Hosen	RISK	
Sing-off details			Identity	Result
1	Bernhardiner	"Don't Stop the Music" by Rihanna	Claudio Zuccolini	OUT
2	Seegott	"Here Without You" by 3 Doors Down	undisclosed	SAFE

=== Week 6 (18 December) ===
Group performance: "Don't Stop Believin'" by Journey

Performances on the sixth episode
#	Stage name	Song	Result	
1	Murmeltier	"You Can Leave Your Hat On" by Joe Cocker	RISK	
2	Fuchs	"Style" by Taylor Swift	RISK	
3	Seegott	"Use Somebody" by Kings of Leon	WIN	
Sing-off details			Identity	Result
1	Murmeltier	"Angels" by Robbie Williams	undisclosed	SAFE
2	Fuchs	"Love Me like You Do" by Ellie Goulding	Eliane	THIRD

Performances on the sixth episode - Final round
#	Stage name	Song	Identity	Result
1	Murmeltier	"Greased Lightnin'" by John Travolta	Baschi	WINNER
2	Seegott	"The Sound of Silence" by Simon & Garfunkel	Arnold Forrer	RUNNER-UP

== Season 2 ==
Stage name	Celebrity	Notability	Episodes						
Stage name	Celebrity	Notability	1	2	3	4	5	6	
Stage name	Celebrity	Notability	1	2	3	4	5	A	B
Mammut "Mammoth"	Ritschi	Musician	WIN	WIN	WIN	WIN	WIN	WIN	WINNER
Pfau "Peacock"	Sandra Studer	Singer	WIN	WIN	RISK	WIN	WIN	RISK	RUNNER-UP
Pinguin "Penguin"	Walter Andreas Müller	Actor	WIN	WIN	WIN	RISK	RISK	THIRD	
Glacé "Ice Cream"	Nicole Bernegger	Singer	WIN	WIN	WIN	RISK	OUT		
Panda	Nemo	Rapper	RISK	RISK	WIN	OUT			
Dschinni "Genie"	Marco Fritsche	Journalist	RISK	RISK	OUT				
Ameise "Ant"	Marco Büchel	Ski racer	RISK	OUT					
Giraffe	Tonia Maria Zindel	Actress	OUT						

The masked singer won their face-off and remained in the competition.
The masked singer lost their face-off and was in the bottom three/two, but was not eliminated.
The masked singer was safe from elimination.
The masked singer was eliminated from the competition and unmasked upon their elimination.

Episodes

=== Week 1 (10 November) ===
Performances on the first episode
#	Stage name	Song	Identity	Result
1	Giraffe	"Crazy in Love" by Beyoncé	Tonia Maria Zindel	OUT
2	Mammut	"Numb" by Linkin Park	undisclosed	WIN
3	Panda	"Wake Me Up Before You Go-Go" by Wham!	undisclosed	RISK
4	Pinguin	"Wellerman" by Nathan Evans	undisclosed	WIN
5	Glacé	"Ex's & Oh's" by Elle King	undisclosed	WIN
6	Ameise	"Thunderball" by Tom Jones	undisclosed	RISK
7	Dschinni	"Friend Like Me" by Robin Williams	undisclosed	RISK
8	Pfau	"Run" by Snow Patrol	undisclosed	WIN

=== Week 2 (17 November) ===
Performances on the second episode
#	Stage name	Song	Identity	Result
1	Glacé	"9 to 5" by Dolly Parton	undisclosed	WIN
2	Dschinni	"More Than Words" by Extreme	undisclosed	RISK
3	Mammut	"Love Runs Out" by OneRepublic	undisclosed	WIN
4	Pinguin	"You Can Get It If You Really Want" by Desmond Dekker	undisclosed	WIN
5	Ameise	"Superheroes" by The Script	Marco Büchel	OUT
6	Panda	"I'm So Excited" by The Pointer Sisters	undisclosed	RISK
7	Pfau	"All I Know So Far" by Pink	undisclosed	WIN

=== Week 3 (24 November) ===
Performances on the third episode
#	Stage name	Song	Identity	Result
1	Pfau	"Don't Start Now" by Dua Lipa	undisclosed	RISK
2	Mammut	"Fallin" by Alicia Keys	undisclosed	WIN
3	Pinguin	"Congratulations" by Cliff Richard	undisclosed	WIN
4	Glacé	"Girls Like Us" by Zoe Wees	undisclosed	WIN
5	Dschinni	"Fly Me To The Moon" by Frank Sinatra	Marco Fritsche	OUT
6	Panda	"Paparazzi" by Lady Gaga	undisclosed	WIN

=== Week 4 (1 December) ===
Performances on the fourth episode
#	Stage name	Song	Result	
1	Mammut	"All the Small Things" by Blink-182	WIN	
2	Pinguin	"(Is This the Way to) Amarillo" by Tony Christie	RISK	
3	Glacé	"Tainted Love" by Soft Cell	RISK	
4	Panda	"Sorry" by Justin Bieber	RISK	
5	Pfau	"Easy on Me" by Adele	WIN	
Sing-off details			Identity	Result
1	Pinguin	"(I Can't Get No) Satisfaction" by The Rolling Stones	undisclosed	SAFE
2	Glacé	"Always Remember Us This Way" by Lady Gaga	undisclosed	SAFE
3	Panda	"Kiwi" by Harry Styles	Nemo	OUT

=== Week 5 (8 December) ===
Performances on the fifth episode
#	Stage name	Song	Result	
1	Pinguin	"Always Look on the Bright Side of Life" by Monty Python	RISK	
2	Pfau	"Colors of the Wind" by Judy Kuhn	WIN	
3	Glacé	"Stronger (What Doesn't Kill You)" by Kelly Clarkson	RISK	
4	Mammut	"Skin" by Rag'n'Bone Man	WIN	
Sing-off details			Identity	Result
1	Pinguin	"Nothing's Gonna Change My Love for You" by George Benson	undisclosed	SAFE
2	Glacé	"No Time to Die" by Billie Eilish	Nicole Bernegger	OUT

=== Week 6 (15 December) - Finale ===
Group performance: "You'll Be In My Heart" by Phil Collins

Performances on the sixth episode - Round 1
#	Stage name	Song	Result	
1	Mammut	"Your Song" by Elton John	WIN	
2	Pfau	"Strong Enough" by Cher	RISK	
3	Pinguin	"La Bamba" by Ritchie Valens/"Sh-Boom" by The Chords/"Tutti Frutti" by Little Richard/"Tequila" by The Champs	RISK	
Sing-off details			Identity	Result
1	Pfau	"There You'll Be" by Faith Hill	undisclosed	SAFE
2	Pinguin	"Last Christmas" by Wham!	Walter Andreas Müller	THIRD

Performances on the sixth episode - Final Round
#	Stage name	Song	Identity	Result
1	Mammut	"Numb" by Linkin Park	Ritschi	WINNER
2	Pfau	"Easy on Me" by Adele	Sandra Studer	RUNNER-UP

== Season 3 ==
Stage name	Celebrity	Notability	Episodes						
Stage name	Celebrity	Notability	1	2	3	4	5	6	
Stage name	Celebrity	Notability	1	2	3	4	5	A	B
Tukan "Toucan"	Joey Heindle	Singer	WIN	WIN	WIN	WIN	WIN	WIN	WINNER
Siebenschläfer "Dormouse"	Maja Brunner	Singer	WIN	WIN	WIN	RISK	RISK	RISK	RUNNER-UP
Robi "Robot"	Michael von der Heide	Singer	WIN	WIN	WIN	RISK	WIN	THIRD	
Koi-Elfe "Koi Elf"	Steffe la Cheffe	Rapper	WIN	RISK	WIN	WIN	OUT		
Löwe "Lion"	Franco Marvulli	Cyclist	RISK	RISK	RISK	OUT			
Eisbär "Polar Bear"	René Rindlisbacher	TV presenter	RISK	WIN	OUT				
Skarabäus "Scarab"	Manuela Frey	Model	RISK	OUT					
Tannenzapfen "Pine Cone"	Sandra Boner	TV presenter	OUT						

The masked singer won their face-off and remained in the competition.
The masked singer lost their face-off and was in the bottom three/two, but was not eliminated.
The masked singer was safe from elimination.
The masked singer was eliminated from the competition and unmasked upon their elimination.

Episodes

=== Week 1 (12 October) ===
Performances on the first episode
#	Stage name	Song	Identity	Result
1	Tukan	"I Still Haven't Found What I'm Looking For" by U2	undisclosed	WIN
2	Robi	"Sunroof" by Nicky Youre	undisclosed	WIN
3	Tannenzapfen	"I Follow Rivers" by Lykke Li	Sandra Boner	OUT
4	Eisbär	"Trouble" by Elvis Presley	undisclosed	RISK
5	Skarabäus	"Hypnotized" by Purple Disco Machine	undisclosed	RISK
6	Siebenschläfer	"Dreamer" by Ozzy Osborne	undisclosed	WIN
7	Löwe	"Wonderwall" by Oasis	undisclosed	RISK
8	Koi-Elfe	"Kiss From A Rose" by Seal	undisclosed	WIN

=== Week 2 (19 October) ===
Performances on the first episode
#	Stage name	Song	Identity	Result
1	Koi-Elfe	"Don't Speak" by No Doubt	undisclosed	RISK
2	Robi	"I Was Made for Lovin' You" by Kiss	undisclosed	WIN
3	Skarabäus	"Unfaithful" by Rihanna	Manuela Frey	OUT
4	Eisbär	"I'm Gonna Be (500 Miles)" by The Proclaimers	undisclosed	WIN
5	Siebenschläfer	"You Know I'm No Good" by Amy Winehouse	undisclosed	WIN
6	Löwe	"Under Control" by Calvin Harris & Alesso ft. Hurts	undisclosed	RISK
7	Tukan	"Bad Liar" by Imagine Dragons	undisclosed	WIN

=== Week 3 (26 October) ===
Performances on the third episode
#	Stage name	Song	Identity	Result
1	Robi	"Blinding Lights" by The Weeknd	undisclosed	WIN
2	Siebenschläfer	"Sk8er Boi" by Avril Lavigne	undisclosed	WIN
3	Löwe	"Don't You Know" by Kungs ft. Jamie N Commons	undisclosed	RISK
4	Koi-Elfe	"Happier Than Ever" by Billie Eilish	undisclosed	WIN
5	Eisbär	"A Little Party Never Killed Nobody (All We Got)" by Fergie, GoonRock & Q-Tip	René Rindlisbacher	OUT
6	Tukan	"Picture of You" by Boyzone	undisclosed	WIN

=== Week 4 (2 November) ===
Performances on the fourth episode
#	Stage name	Song	Result	
1	Siebenschläfer	"Heart of Glass" by Miley Cyrus	RISK	
2	Koi-Elfe	"Part of Your World" from The Little Mermaid	WIN	
3	Robi	"Love My Life" by Robbie Williams	RISK	
4	Löwe	"Smells Like Teen Spirit" by Nirvana	RISK	
5	Tukan	"I Don't Wanna Know" by Mario Winans	WIN	
Sing-off details			Identity	Result
1	Robi	"Hung Up" by Madonna	undisclosed	SAFE
2	Löwe	"Sex Bomb" by Tom Jones	Franco Marvulli	OUT
3	Siebenschläfer	"Dancing in the Dark" by Bruce Springsteen	undisclosed	SAFE

=== Week 5 (9 November) ===
Performances on the fifth episode
#	Stage name	Song	Result	
1	Koi-Elfe	"Just Like Fire" by P!nk	RISK	
2	Robi	"She's So High" by Tal Bachman	WIN	
3	Tukan	"A Thousand Years" by Christina Perri	WIN	
4	Siebenschläfer	"Something's Got a Hold On Me" by Christina Aguilera	RISK	
Sing-off details			Identity	Result
1	Koi-Elfe	"Higher Love" by Steve Winwood	Steff la Cheffe	OUT
2	Siebenschläfer	"Sweet About Me" by Gabriella Cilmi	undisclosed	SAFE

=== Week 6 (16 November) ===
- Group performance: "Heroes" by David Bowie

Performances on the sixth episode
#	Stage name	Song	Result	
1	Siebenschläfer	"Crazy Little Thing Called Love" by Queen	RISK	
2	Robi	"Hold Me Closer" by Elton John & Britney Spears	RISK	
3	Tukan	"Yesterday" by The Beatles	WIN	
Sing-off details			Identity	Result
1	Robi	"Life Is a Rollercoaster" by Ronan Keating	Michael von der Heide	THIRD
2	Siebenschläfer	"Mercy" by Duffy	undisclosed	SAFE

Performances on the sixth episode - Final round
#	Stage name	Song	Identity	Result
1	Siebenschläfer	"Dancing In The Dark" by Bruce Springsteen	Maja Brunner	RUNNER-UP
2	Tukan	"Bad Liar" by Imagine Dragons	Joey Heindle	WINNER

== Season 4 ==
=== Guest panelists ===
Throughout the season, various guest judges appeared alongside Christa Rigozzi and Luca Hänni as the third member of the judging panel.

Episode	Name	Notability
1	Antoine Konrad	DJ
2	Bligg	Rapper
3	Melanie Oesch	Singer
4	Michel Birri	TV Host
5	Dominic Deville	Actor
6	Sven Epiney	Presenter

=== Contestants ===
Stage name	Celebrity	Notability	Episodes						
Stage name	Celebrity	Notability	1	2	3	4	5	6	
Stage name	Celebrity	Notability	1	2	3	4	5	A	B
Orca	Remo Forrer	Singer	WIN	WIN	WIN	WIN	WIN	WIN	WINNER
Nessi	Jonathan Schächter	Presenter	RISK	WIN	WIN	RISK	RISK	RISK	RUNNER-UP
Rüebli "Carrot"	Patric Scott	Singer	WIN	WIN	WIN	RISK	WIN	THIRD	
Reh "Deer"	Linda Fäh	Singer	WIN	WIN	WIN	WIN	OUT		
Schwan "Swan"	Nubya	Singer	WIN	RISK	RISK	OUT			
Bubbels "Bubbles"	Alexandra Maurer	Presenter	RISK	RISK	OUT				
Milch "Milk"	Michel Birri	TV host	RISK	OUT					
Köfferli "Suitcase"	Shawne Fielding	Actress	OUT						

The masked singer won their face-off and remained in the competition.
The masked singer lost their face-off and was in the bottom three/two, but was not eliminated.
The masked singer was safe from elimination.
The masked singer was eliminated from the competition and unmasked upon their elimination.

Episodes

=== Week 1 (15 November) ===
- Guest Performance: Luca Hänni performs "With or Without You" by U2

Performances on the first episode
#	Stage name	Song	Identity	Result
1	Schwan	"The Power of Love" by Frankie Goes to Hollywood	undisclosed	WIN
2	Bubbles	"Dance Monkey" by Tones and I	undisclosed	RISK
3	Orca	"Cosmic Girl" by Jamiroquai	undisclosed	WIN
4	Köfferli	"Time After Time" by Cyndi Lauper	Shawne Fielding	OUT
5	Rüebli	"Sing for the Moment" by Eminem	undisclosed	WIN
6	Reh	"I'm Not a Girl, Not Yet a Woman" by Britney Spears	undisclosed	WIN
7	Milch	"We Are Family" by Sister Sledge	undisclosed	RISK
8	Nessi	"It's a Long Way to the Top (If You Wanna Rock 'n' Roll)" by AC/DC	undisclosed	RISK

=== Week 2 (22 November) ===
Performances on the second episode
#	Stage name	Song	Identity	Result
1	Rüebli	"Bang Bang" by Jessie J, Ariana Grande & Nicki Minaj	undisclosed	WIN
2	Bubbels	"Everybody" by DJ BoBo/"I Like to Move It" by Reel 2 Real	undisclosed	RISK
3	Nessi	"Stonehenge" by Ylvis	undisclosed	WIN
4	Milch	"I Gotta Feeling" by Black Eyed Peas	Michel Birri	OUT
5	Reh	"Dance the Night" by Dua Lipa	undisclosed	WIN
6	Orca	"Bye Bye Bye" by NSYNC	undisclosed	WIN
7	Schwan	"I Dreamed a Dream" by Susan Boyle	undisclosed	RISK

=== Week 3 (29 November) ===
Performances on the third episode
#	Stage name	Song	Identity	Result
1	Schwan	"Bring Me to Life" by Evanescence	undisclosed	RISK
2	Nessi	"Oh, Pretty Woman" by Roy Orbison	undisclosed	WIN
3	Reh	"Once Upon a December" by Liz Callaway	undisclosed	WIN
4	Bubbels	"Dance with Somebody" by Mando Diao	Alexandra Maurer	OUT
5	Orca	"Take On Me" by a-ha	undisclosed	WIN
6	Rüebli	"Nessun Dorma" by Giacomo Puccini/"Come with Me" by Diddy	undisclosed	WIN

=== Week 4 (6 December) ===
Performances on the fourth episode
#	Stage name	Song	Result	
1	Nessi	"Wake Me Up" by Avicii	RISK	
2	Schwan	"Santa Claus Is Comin' to Town" by Mariah Carey	RISK	
3	Orca	"Walk on Water" by Thirty Seconds To Mars	WIN	
4	Rüebli	"If I Were a Boy" by Beyoncé/"You Oughta Know" by Alanis Morissette	RISK	
5	Reh	"Big Girls Don't Cry" by Fergie	WIN	
Sing-off details			Identity	Result
1	Nessi	"Don't Let the Sun Go Down on Me" by Elton John	undisclosed	SAFE
2	Schwan	"Say Something" by A Great Big World & Christina Aguilera	Nubya	OUT
3	Rüebli	"Earth Song" by Michael Jackson	undisclosed	SAFE

=== Week 5 (13 December) ===
Performances on the fifth episode
#	Stage name	Song	Result	
1	Rüebli	"Purple Rain" by Prince	WIN	
2	Nessi	"All I Want For Christmas Is You" by Mariah Carey	RISK	
3	Orca	"My Universe" by Coldplay & BTS	WIN	
4	Reh	"How Far I'll Go" by Auliʻi Cravalho	RISK	
Sing-off details			Identity	Result
1	Nessi	"Laura non c'è" by Nek	undisclosed	SAFE
2	Reh	"Complicated" by Avril Lavigne	Linda Fäh	OUT

=== Week 6 (20 December) ===
- Group performance: "Wonderful Dream (Holidays Are Coming)" by Melanie Thornton

Performances on the sixth episode
#	Stage name	Song	Result	
1	Orca	"How Deep Is Your Love" by Calvin Harris & Disciples	WIN	
2	Rüebli	"Run to You" by Whitney Houston	RISK	
3	Nessi	"The Look" by Roxette	RISK	
Sing-off details			Identity	Result
1	Rüebli	"Come Alive" from The Greatest Showman	Patric Scott	THIRD
2	Nessi	"Home" by Michael Bublé	undisclosed	SAFE

Performances on the sixth episode - Final round
#	Stage name	Song	Identity	Result
1	Orca	"Bye Bye Bye" by NSYNC	Remo Forrer	WINNER
2	Nessi	"Don't Let the Sun Go Down on Me" by Elton John	Jonathan Schächter	RUNNER-UP
