= The Voice of Switzerland =

- Genre: Talent show
- Created by: John de Mol Jr. Roel van Velzen
- Presented by: Sven Epiney; Viola Tami; Christa Rigozzi; Max Loong
- Judges: Stress; Marc Sway; Stefanie Heinzmann; Philipp Fankhauser; DJ Antoine; Anna Rossinelli; Noah Veraguth; Büetzer Buebe
- Composer: Martijn Schimmer
- Country of origin: Switzerland
- Original language: German
- No. of seasons: 3
- No. of episodes: 35

Production
- Production companies: Talpa (2013-2014); ITV Studios (2020)

Original release
- Network: SRF 1
- Release: 26 January 2013 – 19 April 2014
- Network: 3+
- Release: 27 January – 6 April 2020

Related
- The Voice of Holland

The Voice of Switzerland is a Swiss reality talent show created by John de Mol Jr. and based on the concept The Voice of Holland. It is part of an international series. It began airing on SRF 1 on 26 January 2013, and its second season ended on 19 April 2014. After 5 years the show returned, on 27 January 2020, on 3+.

== Format ==
About 110 participants are invited for the first phase of the television program, the so-called "blind auditions". There, the candidates, accompanied by a live band, have to sing in front of an audience on a stage. At first, the jury members can only hear but not see the singer because they are sitting in a swivel chair with their backs to the stage. You can vote for a candidate by turning to them during the audition lecture to see them. The candidate will go one round if they receive at least one of the four jury votes. Among those jury members who have turned for them, the candidate chooses their coach for the further rounds. In the blind auditions each of the four coaches should get a group of ten candidates.

This is followed by a training session in which the coaches prepare their candidates for the second phase called "Battle Round". In the Battle Round, two candidates from the same coaching group sing one song in a duet. Only one of the two candidates will continue after the decision of the respective coach. Since the second season (2014), a candidate who has not been selected by his own coach can be taken on by one of the other coaches. After the battles each coach selects three artists for the live shows in a phase called "Sing-off" (2013) or "Knockout Round" (2014).

In the last phase, the live shows, the candidates compete against each other within their coaching groups and are judged by both the coaches and the television viewers. Representatives of different coaches meet each other in the final of the best four participants. In the final only the television viewers decide on the victory.

== Coaches and presenters ==
=== Coaches ===
Coach	Seasons		
Coach	1	2	3
Stress			
Marc			
Stefanie			
Philipp			
DJ Antoine			
Anna			
Noah Veraguth			
Büetzer Buebe			

Coaches gallery

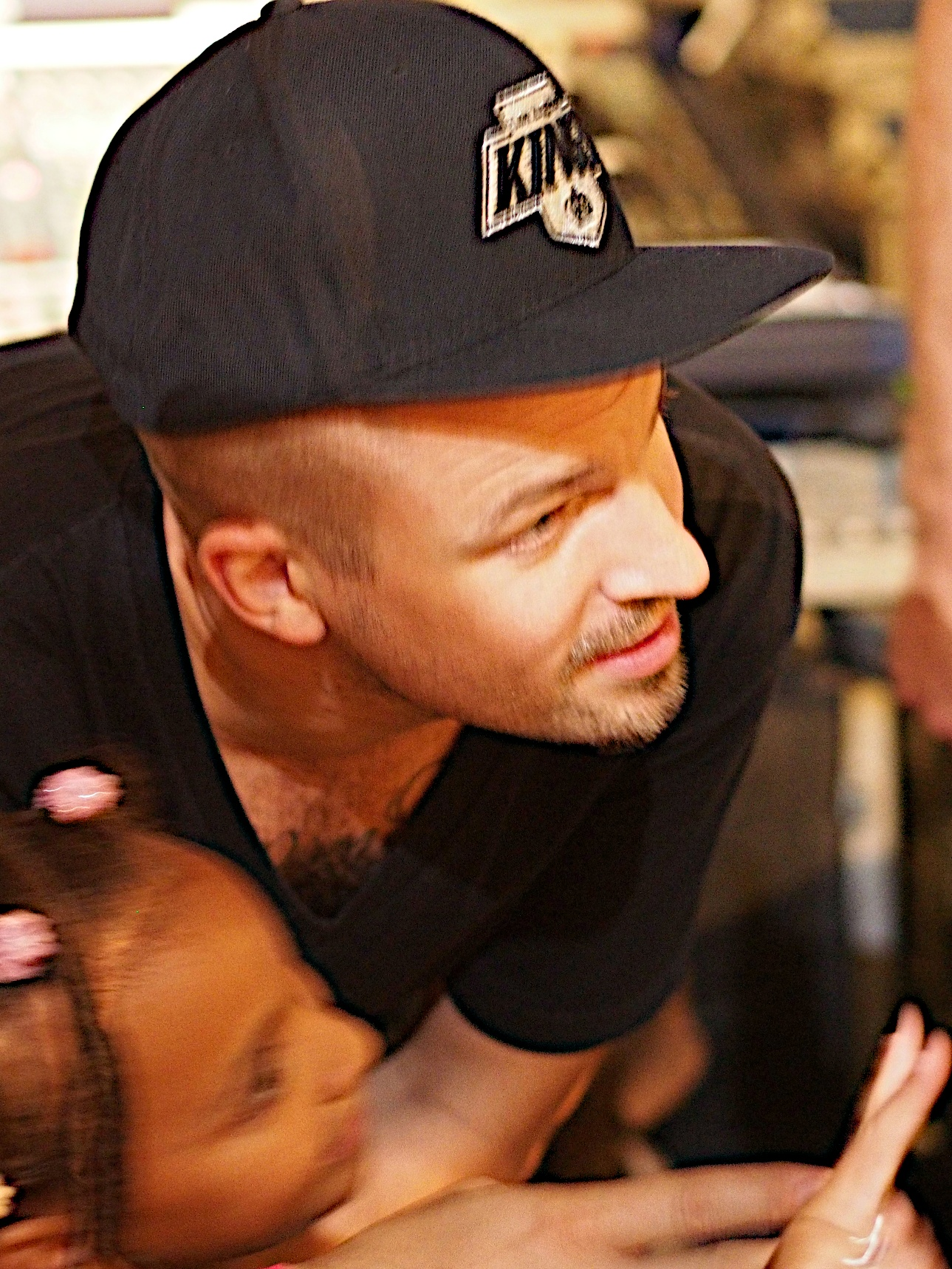
Stress (2013–2014)

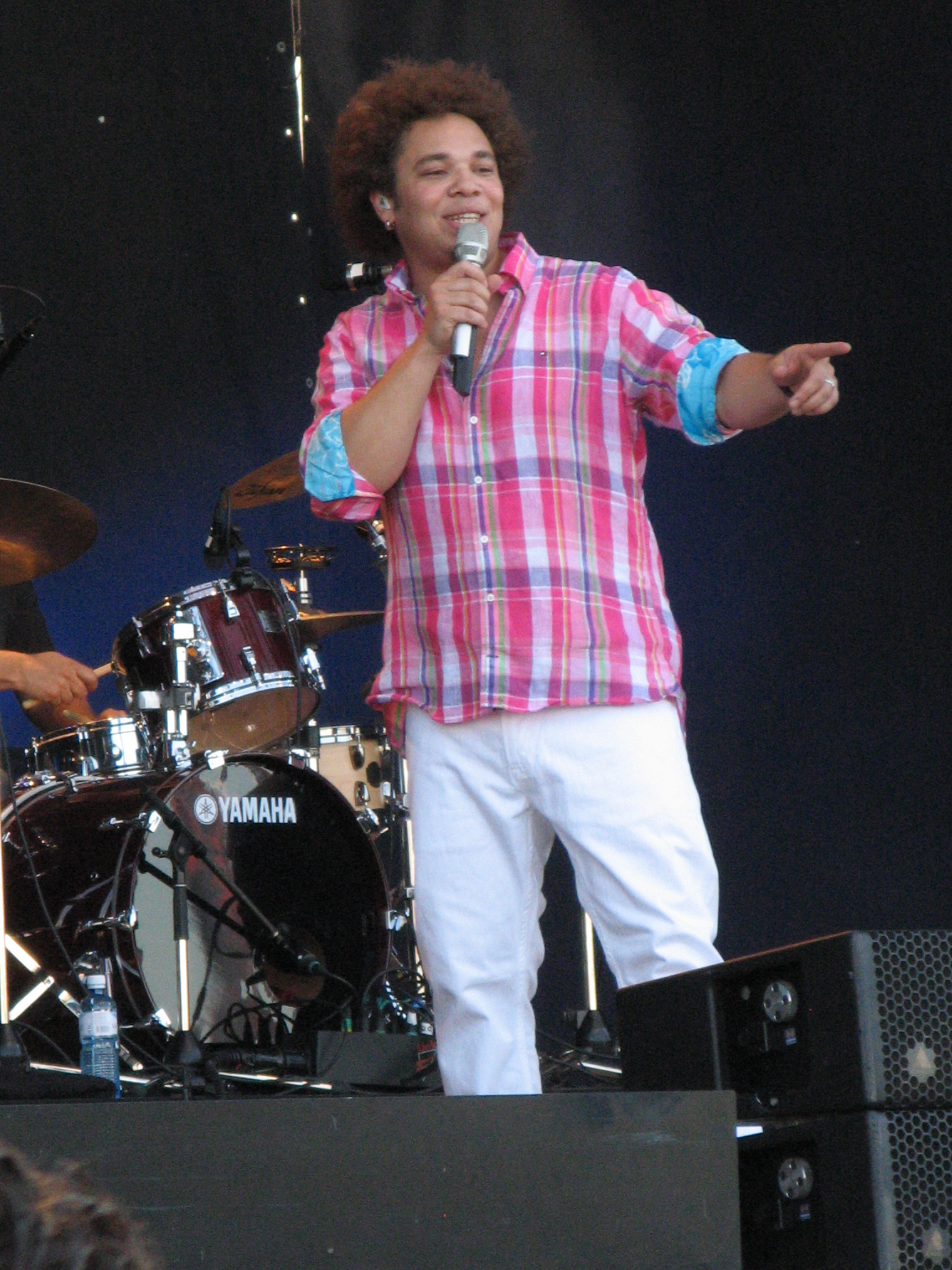
Marc Sway (2013–2014)

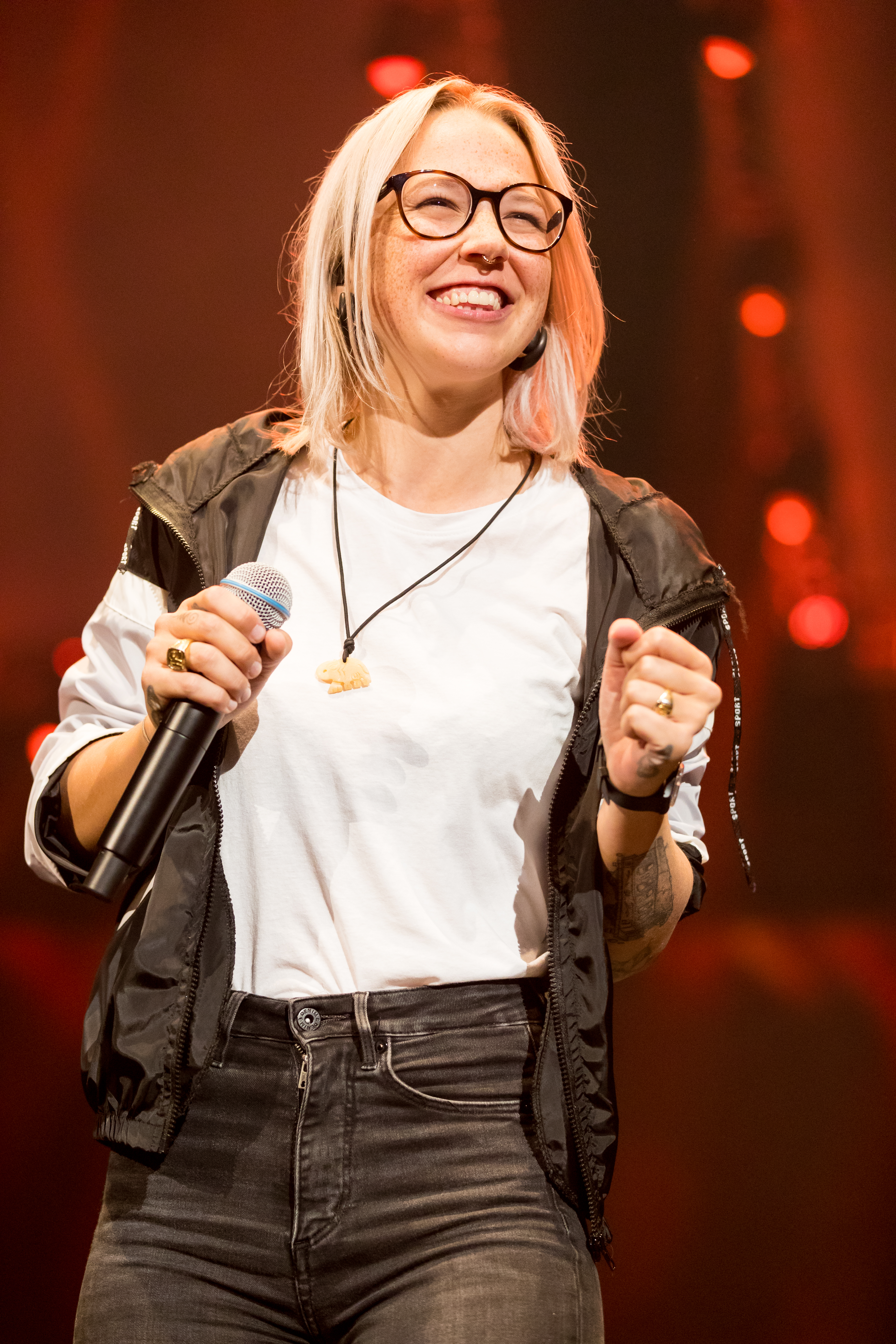
Stefanie Heinzmann (2013–2014)

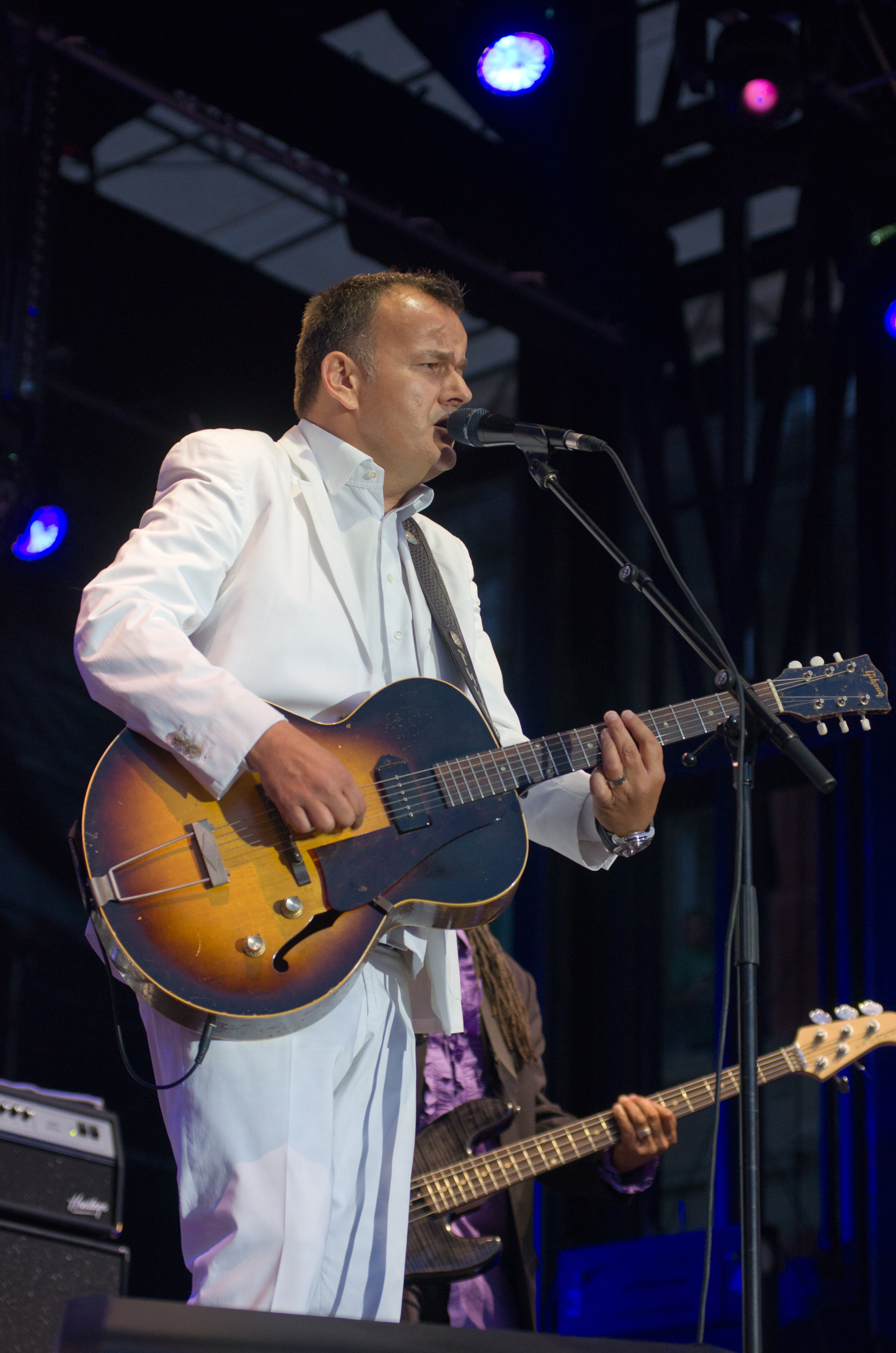
Philipp Fankhauser (2013–2014)

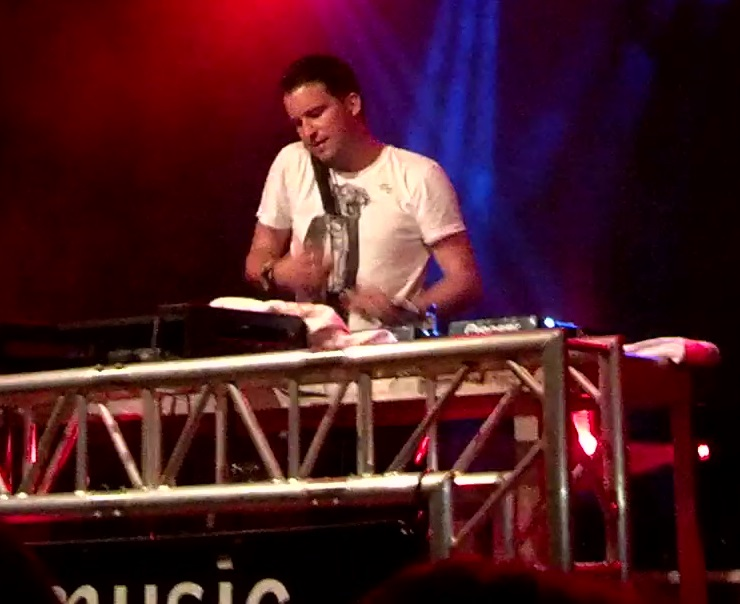
DJ Antoine (2020)

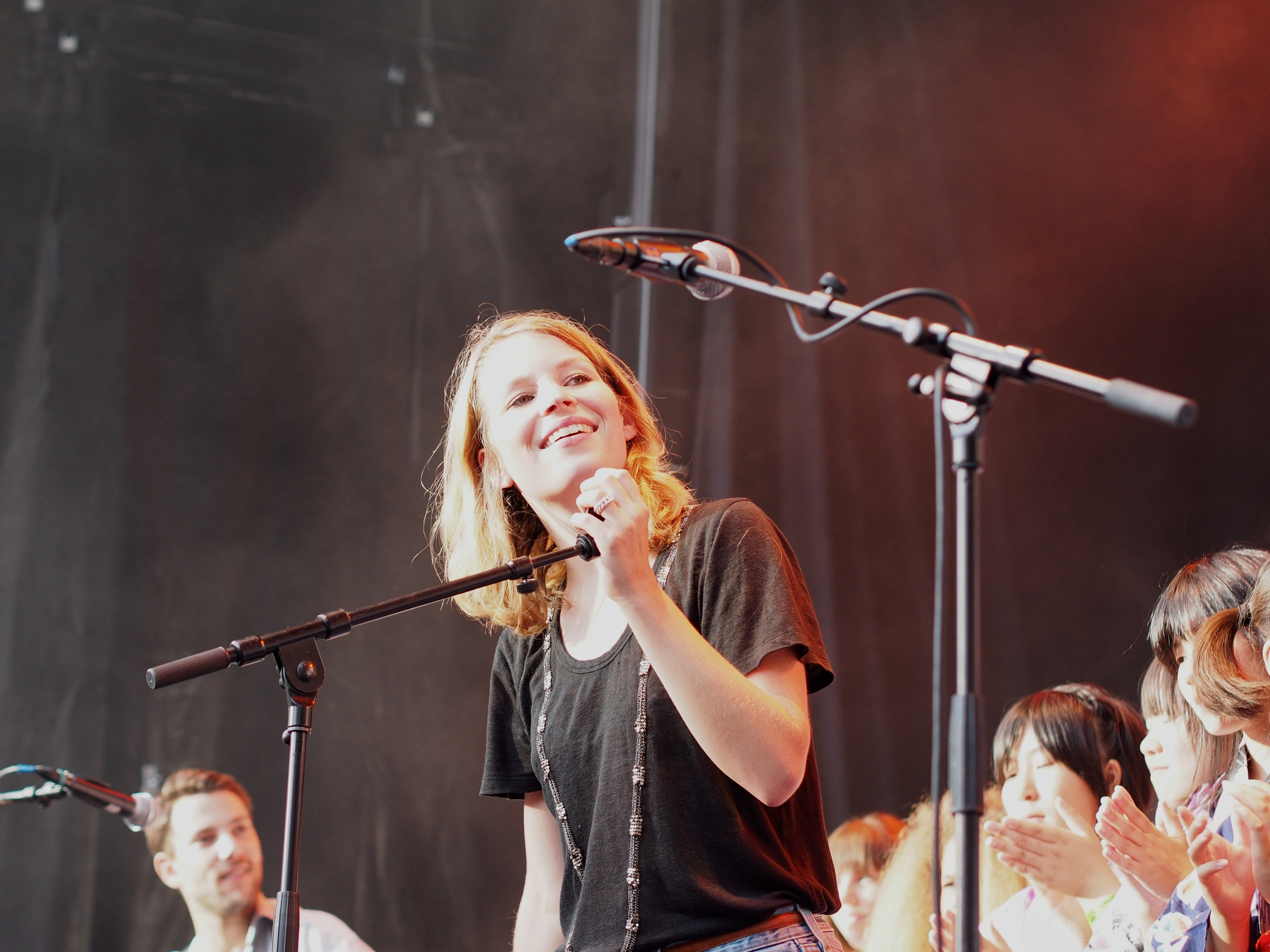
Anna Rossinelli (2020)

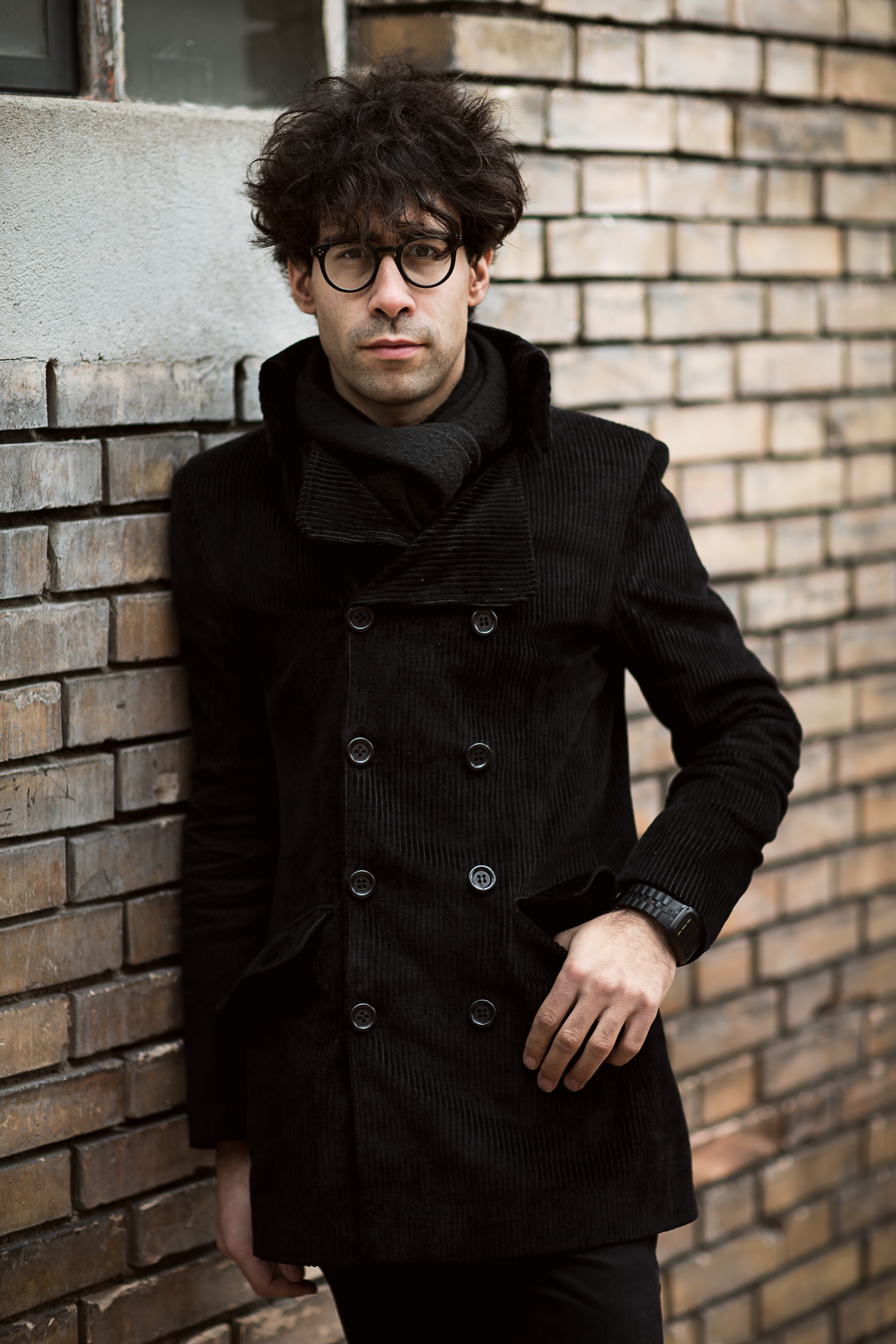
Noah Veraguth (2020)

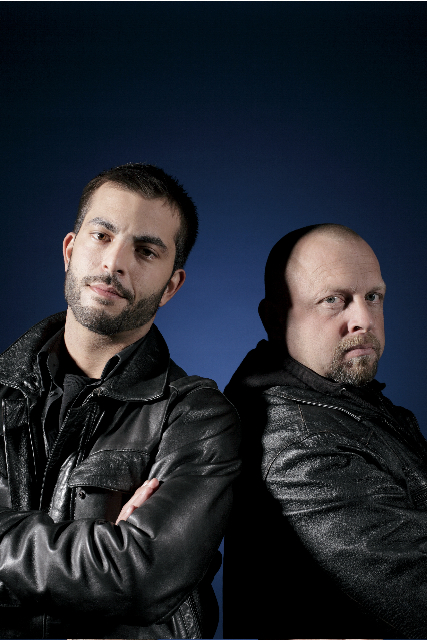
Büetzer Buebe (duo, 2020)

=== Presenters ===
Presenter	Seasons		
Presenter	1	2	3
Sven			
Viola			
Tanya			
Christa			
Max			

Key
Main presenter
Backstage presenter

Main Presenters gallery

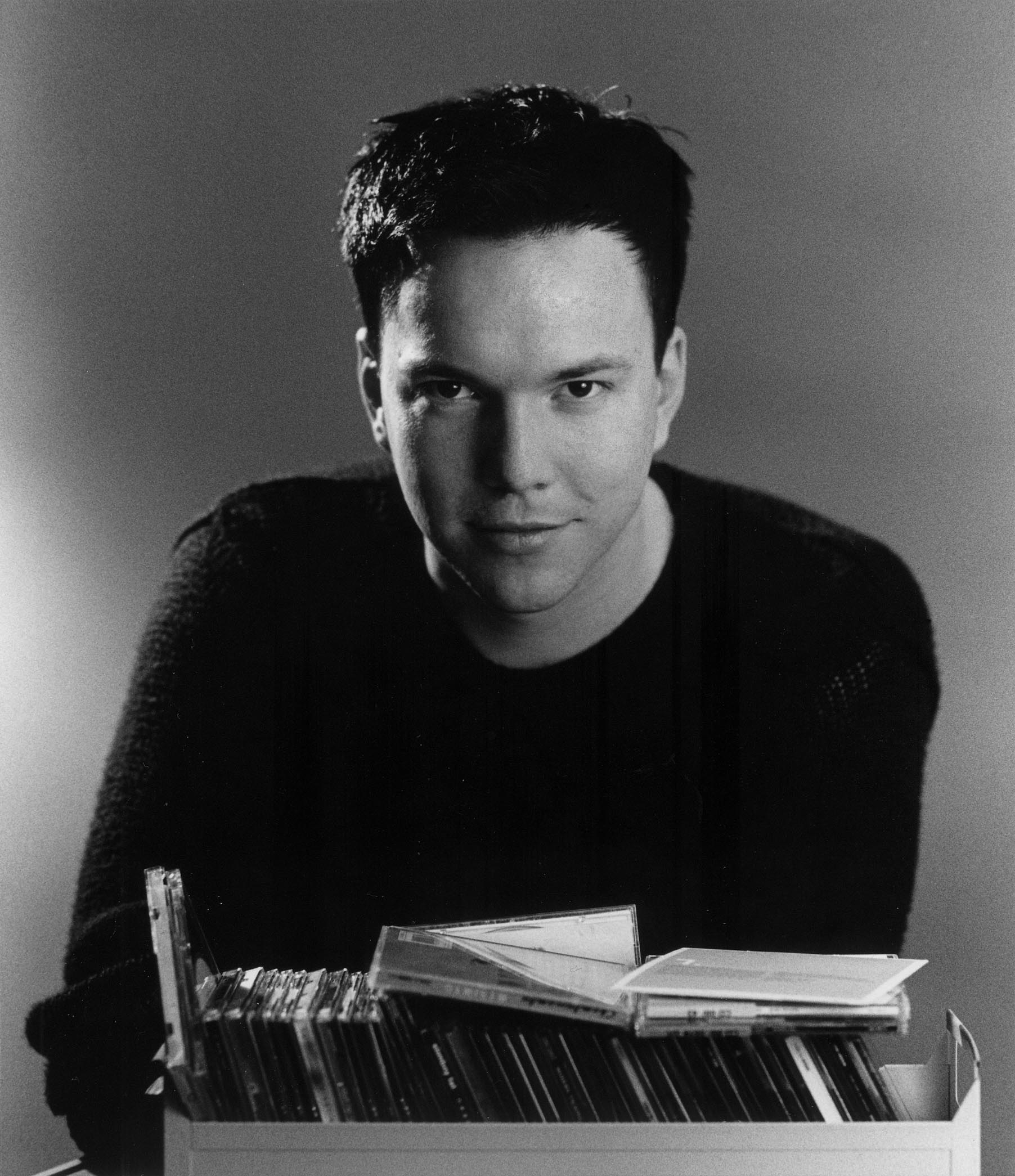
Sven Epiney (2013–2014)

Viola Tami (2014)

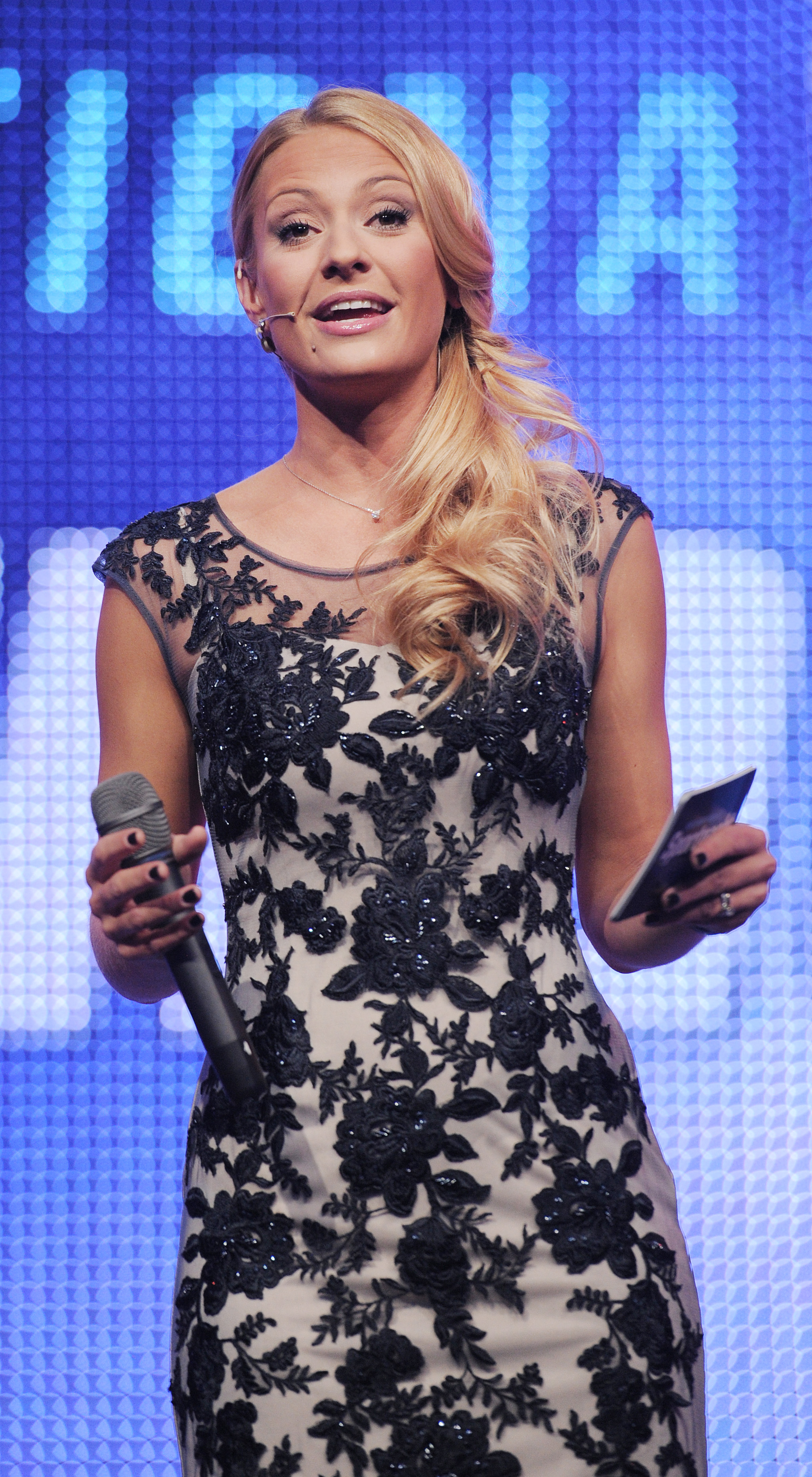
Christa Rigozzi (2020)

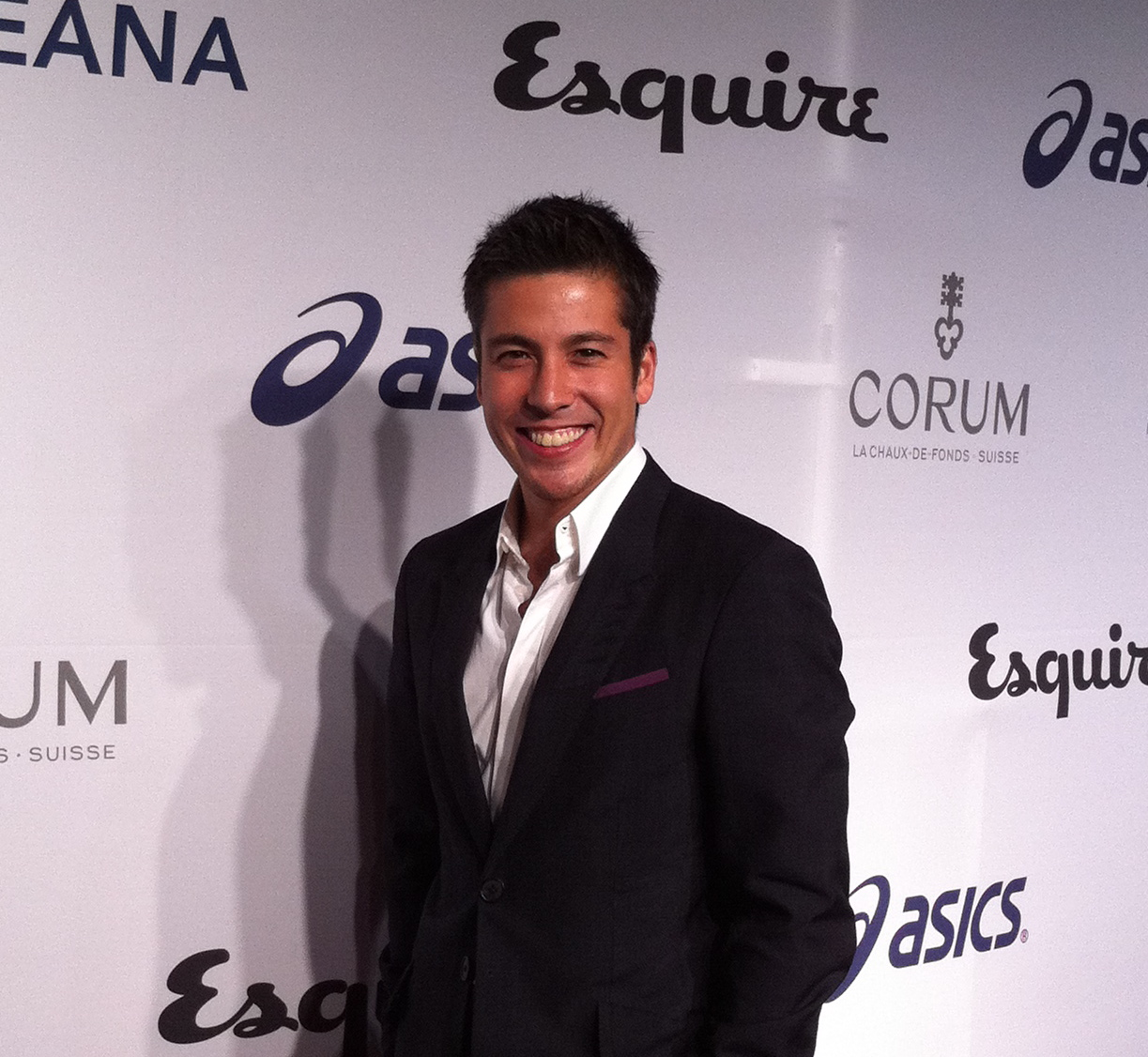
Max Loong (2020)

== Coaches and finalists ==
– Winning coach and contestant
– Runner-up coach and contestant
– Third place coach and contestant
– Fourth place coach and contestant

Winners are in bold, the finalists are in italicized font, and the eliminated artists are in small font.

Seasons	Coaches and their finalists			
1	Marc Sway	Stress	Stefanie Heinzmann	Philipp Fankhauser
1	Sarah Quartetto; Simona Lüthi; Tanja Zimmermann	**Nicole Bernegger**; Leslie Philbert; Deborah Bough	Angie Ott; Gabriela Grossenbacher; Valon Muhadri	Iris Moné; Ricardo Sanz; Gisel de Marco
2	**Tiziana Gulino**; Brendon Schoen Johnson; Stefania Pagano	Rahel Buchhold; Freschta Akbarzada; Glory Bosnjak	Shem Thomas; Vanessa Iraci; Céline Bührer	Peter Brandenberger; Will G. Maxim Essindi
3	Büetzer Buebe	Anna Rossinelli	Noah Veraguth	DJ Antoine
3	Martina Vogel; Jacky Widmer	Drilona Musa; Lorena Beadini	**Remo Forrer**; Meo Dalgic	Diego Daniele; Axel Marena

== Season summary ==
Coaches' color key
Team Philipp	Team Anna
Team Marc	Team Büetzer Buebe
Team Stefanie	Team DJ Antoine
Team Stress	Team Noah

Warning: the following table presents a significant amount of different colors.

The Voice of Switzerland series overview
#	Aired	Winner	Other finalists							Winning coach	Hosts
1	2013	Nicole Bernegger	Angie Ott	Sarah Quartetto	Iris Moné	—N/a				Stress	Sven Epiney, Viola Tami
2	2014	Tiziana Gulino	Shem Thomas	Peter Brandenberger	Rahel Buchhold	—N/a				Marc Sway	Sven Epiney, Viola Tami
3	2020	Remo Forrer	Jacky Widmer	Martina Vogel	Drilona Musa	Lorena Beadini	Meo Dalgic	Axel Marena	Diego Daniele	Noah Veraguth	Max Loong, Christa Rigozzi
