= Art on Ice =

Swiss figure skating event

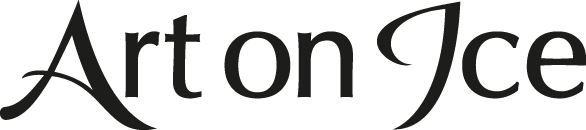
- Location: Zürich, Basel, Davos, Fribourg, Lausanne, St. Moritz
- Country: Switzerland
- Presented by: Art on Ice Production AG, Zollikon-Zürich
- Website: www.artonice.com

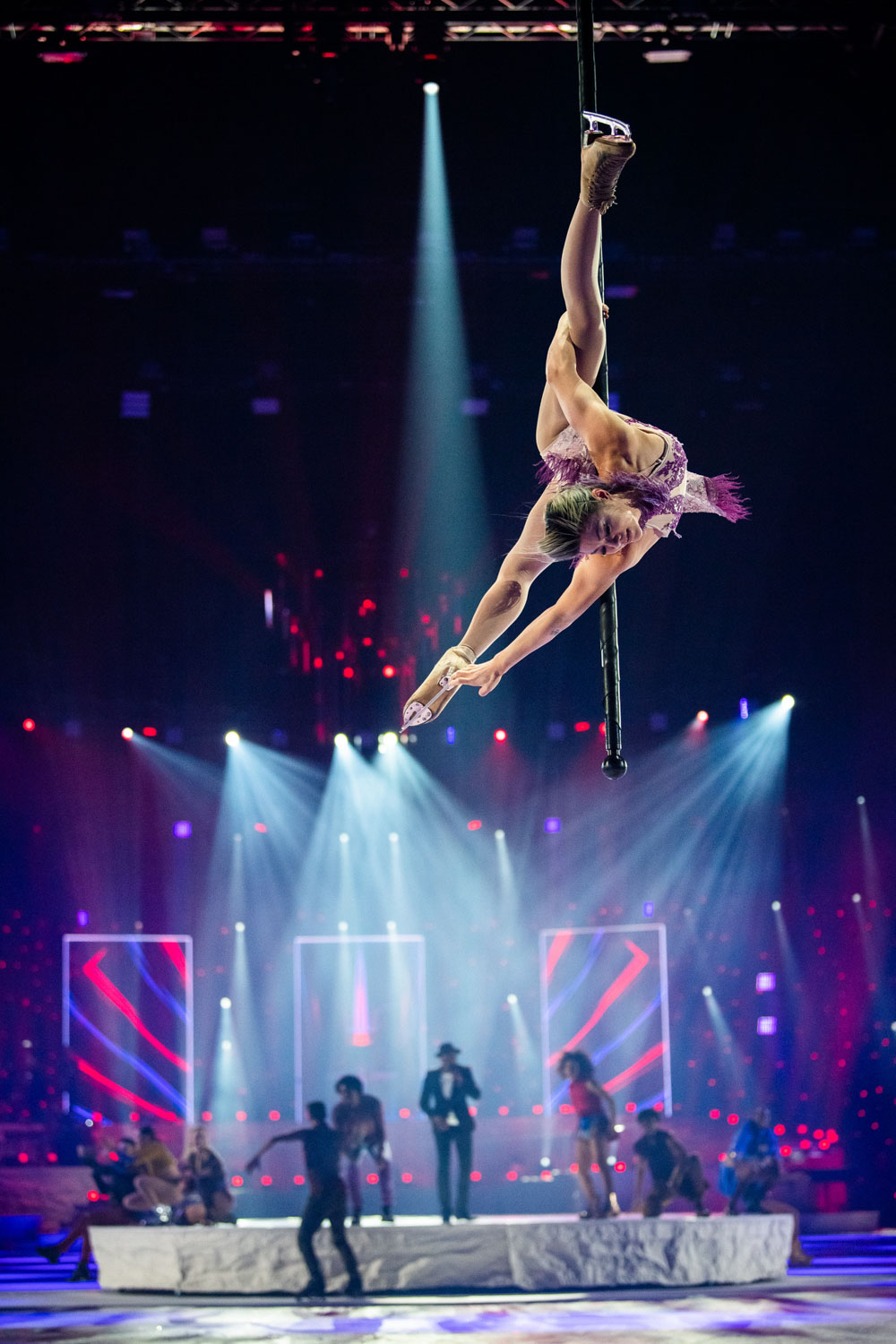
Art on Ice, Zürich 2020

Art on Ice is a Swiss figure skating gala. It combines performances of the world's best figure skaters with those of international music stars. The gala is held annually at the Hallenstadion in Zurich, followed by events in other cities such as Fribourg and Davos. In previous years, Basel, Lausanne, and St. Moritz were also among the venues. The event, which is popular among the population, is also broadcast on television on a time-delayed basis. The event is considered the leading event of its kind in the world.

== History ==
The show was based on an idea by Oliver Höner and first took place in 1995 under the title World Class Figure Skating in the ice rink in Küsnacht. One year later, Oliver Höner, together with Reto Caviezel, realized the show with live music under the name Art on Ice in the Hallenstadion in Zürich. There, the show is now performed on four evenings in front of around 10,000 spectators each time. Each year, Art on Ice attracts around 80,000 spectators. Art on Ice has been performed abroad several times, for example in China, Japan, Finland and Sweden.

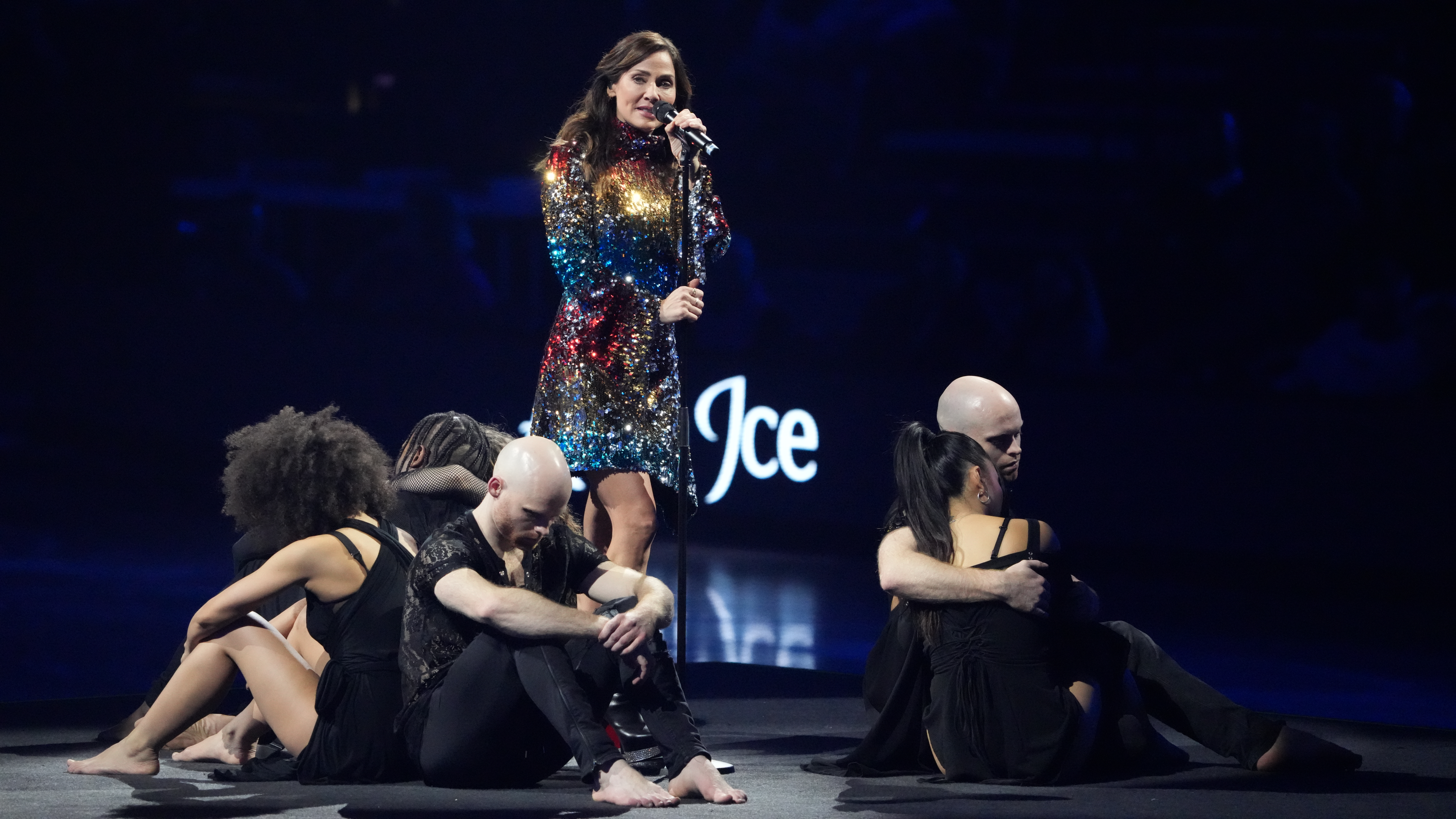
Natalie Imbruglia performing at Art on Ice Zürich, 2024

In 2020, Art on Ice could celebrate its 25th anniversary with a big show and famous world stars. The figure skating gala was held in February before the COVID-19 outbreak in Switzerland. In 2021, the organizers had to abandon the usual shows because of the COVID-19 pandemic. However, the dinner show Art on Ice Special was offered in September 2021 for about 1000 guests. The line-up of stars matched the standard of previous years: Victoria Sinitsina, Nikita Katsalapov, Vanessa James, Eric Radford and Alina Zagitova.

At the end of November 2021, it was announced that Art on Ice would have to postpone their 2022 Swiss tour to 2023. Following the dinner show concept of fall 2021, top class figure skating will still be offered. On March 3, 4 and 5, 2021, three dinner shows Art on Ice Special with international stars for 1000 guests each were held in Zürich's Hallenstadion.

The 2023 tour successfully took place from February 2nd to 12th in Zurich, Fribourg, and Davos, showcasing world-class figure skaters like Gabriella Papadakis, Guillaume Cizeron, and Loena Hendrickx, with musical support from Melanie C, Marc Sway, and Gjon's Tears. The 2024 tour was scheduled for February 8th to 17th in the same cities, featured stars such as Gabriella Papadakis, Guillaume Cizeron, Loena Hendrickx, and Adam Siao Him Fa, and included musical highlights from Dave Stewart (Eurythmics), Natalie Imbruglia, Marc Storace (Krokus), and Remo Forrer. In 2025, the show took place from February 6 to 15. The lineup featured four major music acts: Paloma Faith as the main headliner, Birdy as a special guest, and Swiss artists Marius Bear (ESC participant) and Stress. Gabriella Papadakis, a French ice dancer and five-time world champion (2015–2022), was once again part of the lineup. However, unlike previous years, in 2025 she did not perform with her long-time partner Guillaume Cizeron, but formed an all-female duo with the American ice dancer Madison Hubbell. They combined classical ice dancing elements with experimental figures that deliberately avoided gender-specific roles.

The ice skating show Art on Ice celebrated its 30th anniversary in 2026 with a tour through Zurich, Fribourg, and Davos. The premiere drew special attention due to the unannounced return of former figure skater Denise Biellmann, who performed her signature spin 23 years after her last appearance in the show. The musical star guest was British singer Jess Glynne. Among the figure skaters were European champion Lukas Britschgi, world champion Ilia Malinin, and other athletes.

The figure skaters who have performed at Art on Ice so far include:

Olympic champions:
- Evgeny Plushenko
- Alexei Urmanov
- Alexei Yagudin
- Shizuka Arakawa
- Oksana Baiul
- Pasha Grishuk
- Marina Anissina, Gwendal Peizerat
- Oxana Kasakowa, Artur Dmitriev
- Tatiana Navka, Roman Kostomarov
- Jamie Salé, David Pelletier
- Tatjana Totmianina, Maxim Marinin
- Tatiana Volosozhar, Maxim Trankov
- Tessa Virtue, Scott Moir
- Meryl Davis, Charlie White
- Alina Zagitova
- Gabriella Papadakis, Guillaume Cizeron
- Madison Hubbell
World champions:
- Kurt Browning
- Stéphane Lambiel
- Brian Orser
- Denise Biellmann
- Shae-Lynn Bourne
- Maria Butyrskaya
- Lu Chen
- Juka Sato
- Irina Slutskaya
- Anita Hartshorn, Frank Sweiding
- Radka Kovarikova, René Novotny
- Anjelika Krylova, Oleg Ovsyannikov
- Elena Leonova, Andrei Khvalko
- Aljona Savchenko, Robin Szolkowy
- Xue Shen, Hongbo Zhao
- Maya Usova, Alexander Zhulin
- Mandy Wötzel, Ingo Steuer
- Daisuke Takahashi
- Victoria Sinitsina, Nikita Katsalapov
- Alexa Knierim, Brandon Frazier
- Eric Radford
- Javier Fernandez
- Gabriella Papadakis
- Ilia Malinin
- Madison Chock und Evan Bates
- Deanna Stellato-Dudek und Maxime Deschamps

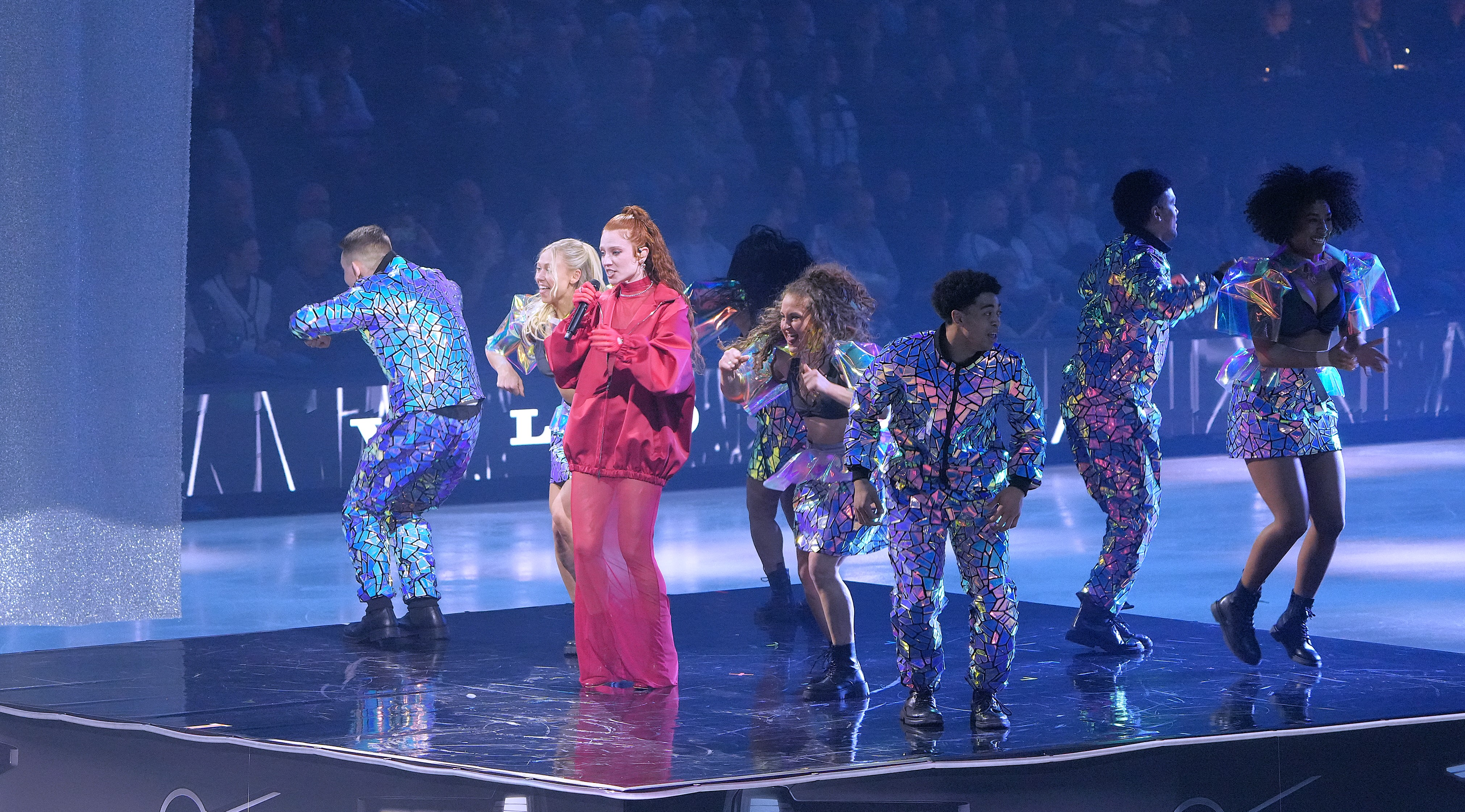
Jess Glynne at Art on Ice 2026 in Zürich

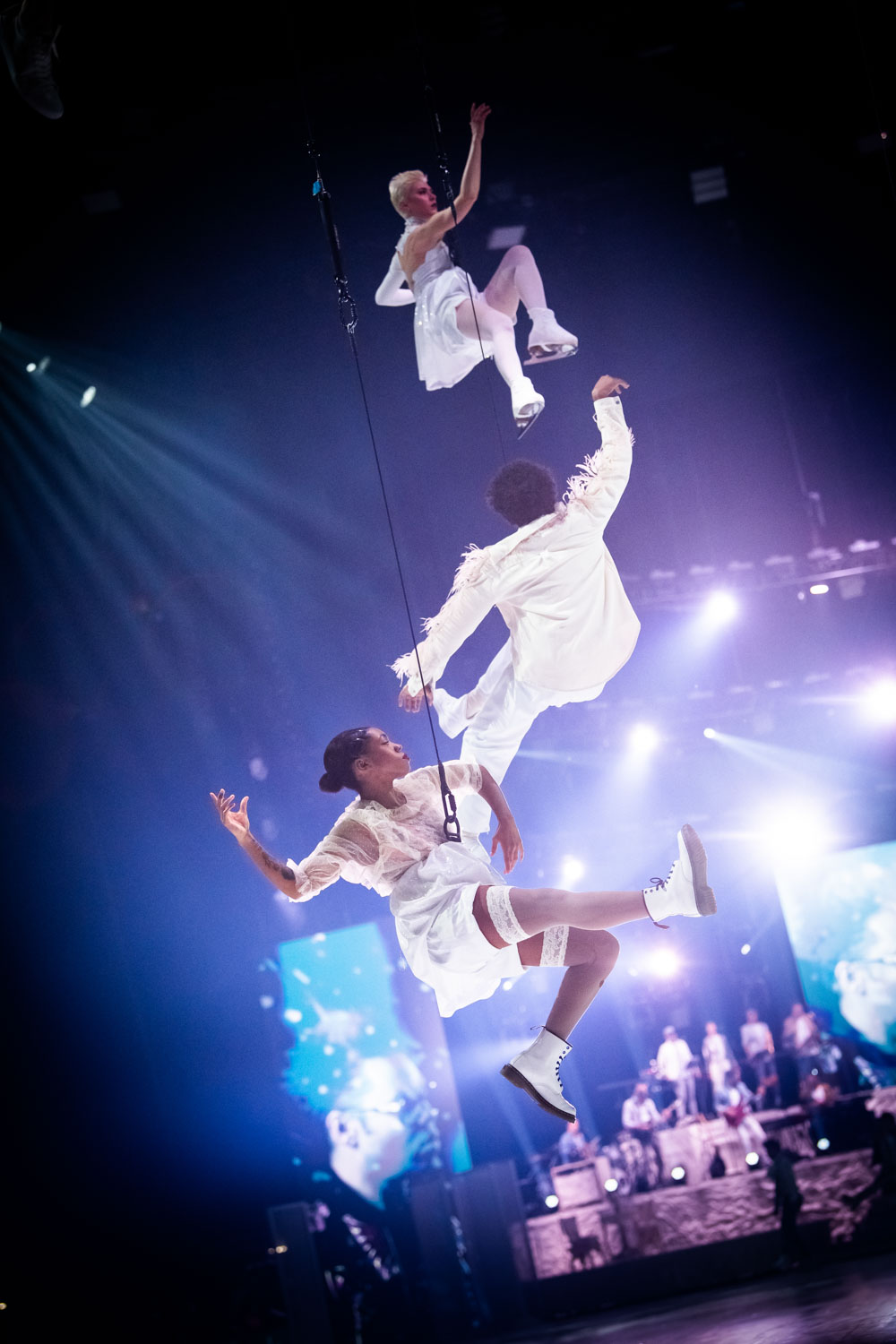
Art on Ice 2020

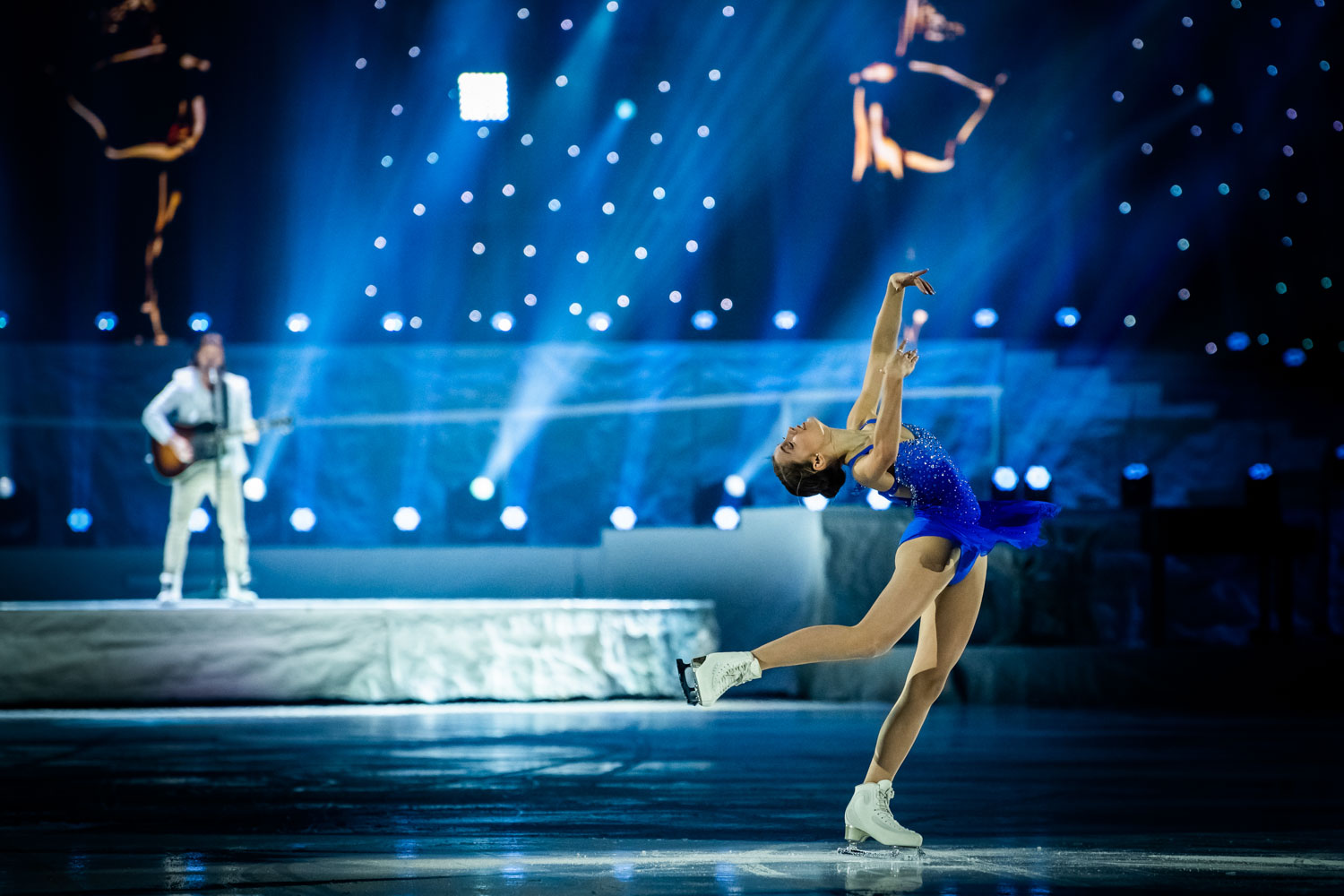
Alexia Paganini performs a layback spin during Art on Ice Zürich 2020

The list of music stars who have performed for Art on Ice includes:

Jahr	Künstler
1996	Simon Estes
1997	Montserrat Caballé
1998	Sarah Brightman, Udo Jürgens
1999	Chris de Burgh
2000	Vanessa-Mae
2001	Scorpions
2002	Gotthard, Gloria Gaynor
2003	Zucchero, Isabelle Flachsmann, Patrick von Castelberg
2004	Barclay James Harvest, Members of Supertramp, Fleetwood Mac, The Moody Blues
2005	Seal, Lovebugs
2006	Lisa Stansfield, Noëmi Nadelmann
2007	Robin Gibb, Gölä
2008	Ronan Keating, Kim Wilde, Garðar Thór Cortes, Chris de Burgh
2009	Sugababes, Daniel Powter, Paul Cless, Tanja Dankner, Gary Scott
2010	Anastacia, David Garrett, Seven
2011	Donna Summer, Katherine Jenkins, Lang Lang
2012	Mick Hucknall (Simply Red), Emily Bear, Dionne Bromfield, TinkaBelle, Li Yuchun
2013	Leona Lewis, 2Cellos, Seven, Katherine Jenkins, Fumiya Fujii
2014	Hurts, Chatia Buniatischwili, Loreen
2015	Nelly Furtado, Tom Odell
2016	Jessie J, The Jacksons, James Gruntz
2017	James Morrison, Chaka Khan
2018	Emeli Sandé, Laura Bretan
2019	James Blunt, Stefanie Heinzmann
2020	Bligg, Bastian Baker, Aloe Blacc, Rebecca Ferguson
2021	James Morrison, Gjon's Tears
2022	John Newman, Anna Rossinelli
2023	Melanie C, Gjon's Tears
2024	Dave Stewart (Eurythmics), Natalie Imbruglia
2025	Birdy, Paloma Faith, Marius Bear, Stress
2026	James Bay, Jess Glynne, Stress, Stefanie Heinzmann, Noah Veraguth

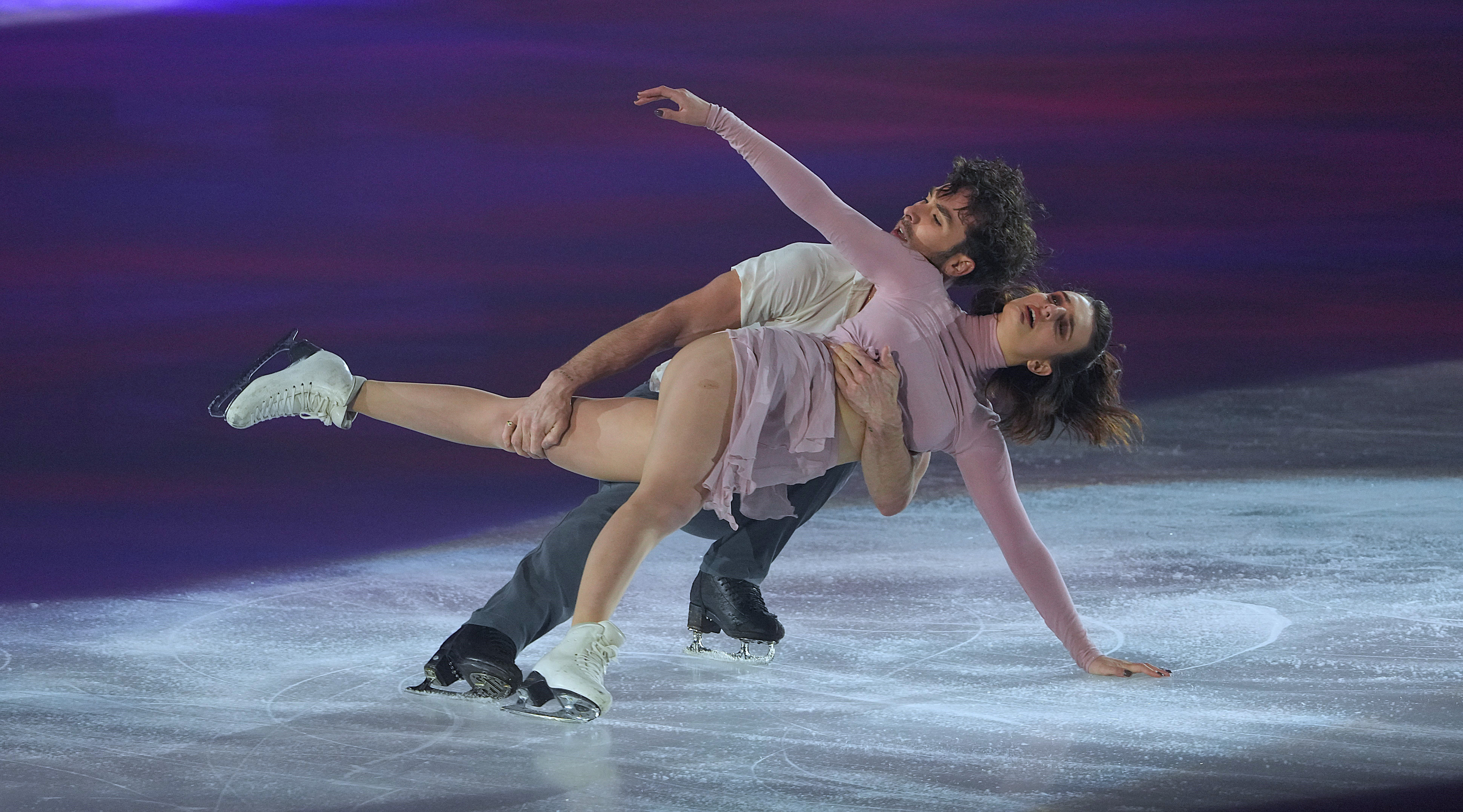
Gabriella Papadakis & Guillaume Cizeron performing during Art on Ice 2024
