= Nicole Bernegger =

Swiss soul singer

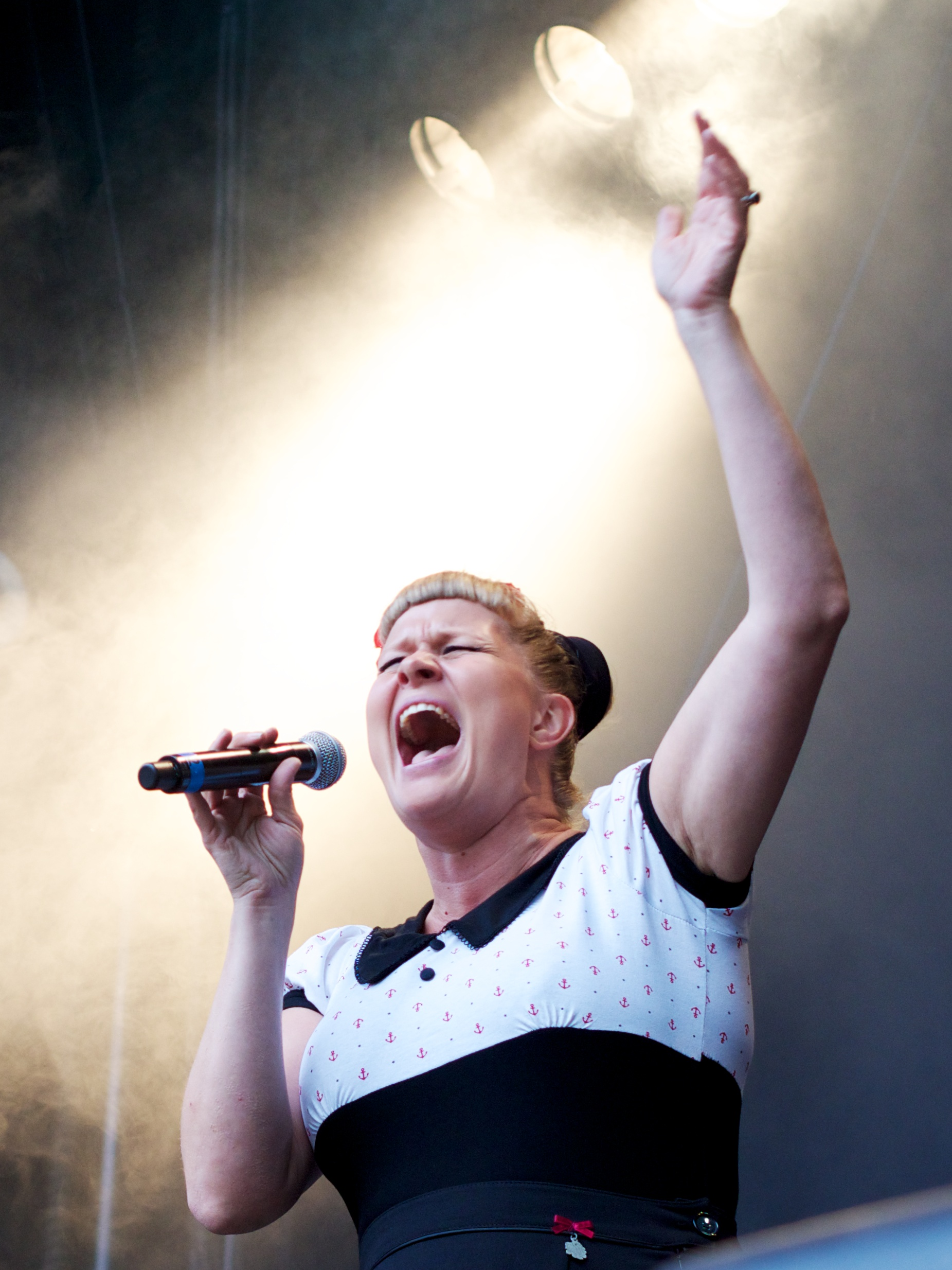
- Bernegger at Openair auf dem Bundesplatz in 2013

Background information
- Birth name: Nicole Schlachter
- Born: 10 March 1977 (age 48); Möhlin, Aargau, Switzerland
- Genres: Soul
- Occupation: Singer
- Labels: Universal

Nicole Bernegger (née Schlachter; born 10 March 1977) is a Swiss soul singer who was the winner of the first season of The Voice of Switzerland. She is also the lead singer of the soul band "The Kitchenettes", founded in 2003.

== Biography ==
Bernegger, who was born as Nicole Schlachter, was born and raised in Möhlin, Aargau. At the age of 20, she moved to Basel to study German and history.

In 2012–2013, Bernegger took part in the first season of the Swiss reality talent show The Voice of Switzerland. When she won the final on 16 March 2013, she was in the seventh month of her pregnancy. The winning single "No Matter" reached number one on the Swiss iTunes charts and #4 on the singles chart. Half a year after winning, she released her first album called The Voice. It reached number three on the Swiss albums chart and was certified gold for selling more than 10,000 copies.

== Personal life ==
Bernegger lives with her husband Daniel and three children in Birsfelden in the canton of Basel-Landschaft.

== Discography ==
Studio Albums

- The Voice (2013)
- Small Town (2015)
- Alien Pearl (2019)

=== Singles ===
==== As lead artist ====
- No Matter (2013)
- The Fool (2013)
- Don't Stay Away (2015)

==== As featured artist ====
- Horizon / Stress featuring Nicole Bernegger (2014)
