= Christa Rigozzi =

Swiss model (born 1983)

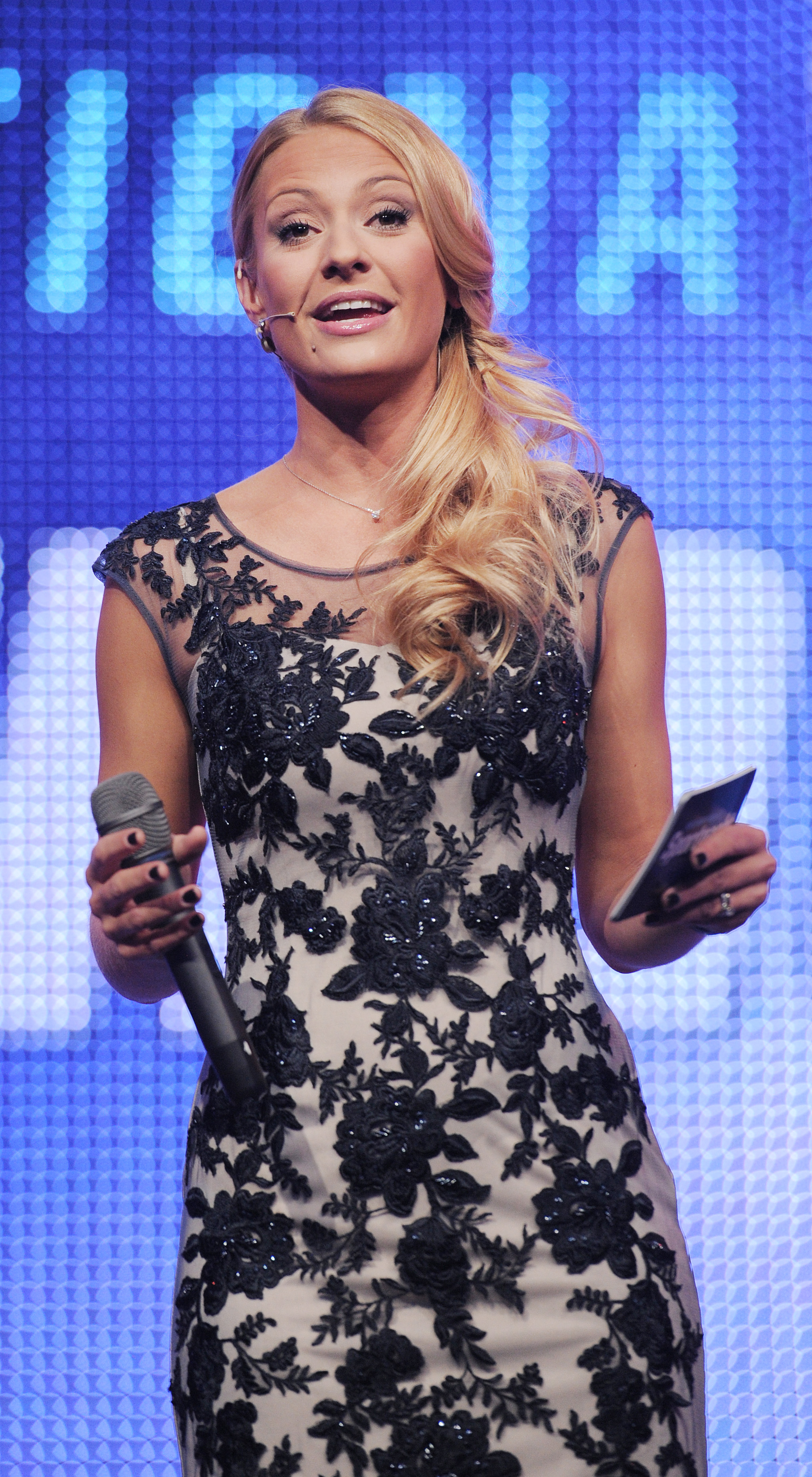
- Rigozzi speaking in 2014
- Born: 2 May 1983 (age 42); Monte Carasso, Ticino, Switzerland
- Known for: Winner of Miss Switzerland in 2006
- Height: 5 ft 7 in (1.70 m)
- Spouse: Giovanni Marchese (m. 2010)
- Children: 2
- Website: www.christarigozzi.ch (German)

Christa Rigozzi (born 2 May 1983) is a Swiss beauty pageant titleholder who was crowned Miss Switzerland 2006 and represented her country at Miss Universe 2007.

== Early life ==
Rigozzi was born on 2 May 1983 in Monte Carasso, Ticino, Switzerland. She studied media and communication science at the University of Friborg and, as an adjunct, criminal law and criminology at the University of Bern.

== Career ==
On 9 September 2006 Rigozzi won Miss Switzerland in Geneva. This thrust Rigozzi into International media spotlight and gave her notoriety within the modeling industry. Along with this Rigozzi has appeared in multiple advertising campaigns in Switzerland and the rest of Europe. She has also appeared in television, in 2008 she appeared in multiple French and German advertisements dealing with luxury bedding, cars and food companies.

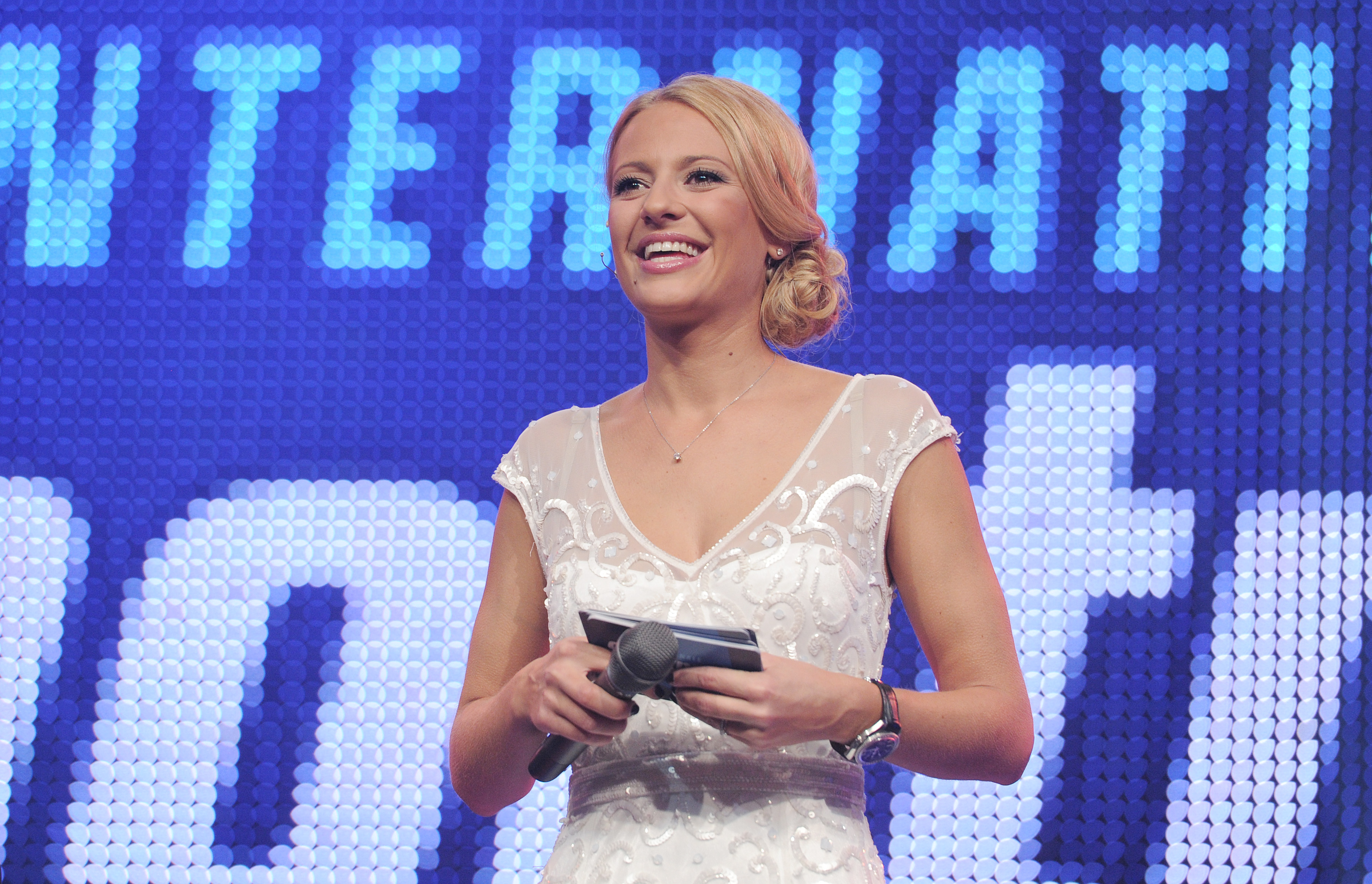
Rigozzi at the Internationale Sportnacht Davos in 2014

In 2011 she took over the role as a presenter and entertainer of the first Swiss tour of "Rock Circus" for The Tent. Also in 2015 Rigozzi judged the third season of Die grössten Schweizer Talente a German talent show together with the jurors DJ Bobo, Sven Epiney and Gilbert Gress. At the beginning of 2016 she moderated the Swiss Awards for Swiss Television together with Sven Epiney.

== Personal life ==
Rigozzi married Giovanni Marchese, Swiss-born of Sicilian descent from Castelvetrano, on 20 August 2010, and on 31 December 2016 Rigozzi gave birth to twin girls. She and her family live in a village in Ticino.

Preceded by Lauriane Gilliéron	Miss Switzerland; 2006	Succeeded by Amanda Ammann
