= Philipp Fankhauser =

Swiss blues musician and songwriter

- Birth name: Philipp Manuel Fankhauser
- Born: 20 February 1964 (age 61); Thun, Switzerland
- Genres: Blues; rhythm and blues
- Occupations: Singer; guitarist; songwriter; record producer
- Instruments: Guitar; vocals
- Years active: 1987-present
- Labels: Sony Music; Funk House Blues Productions
- Website: philippfankhauser.com

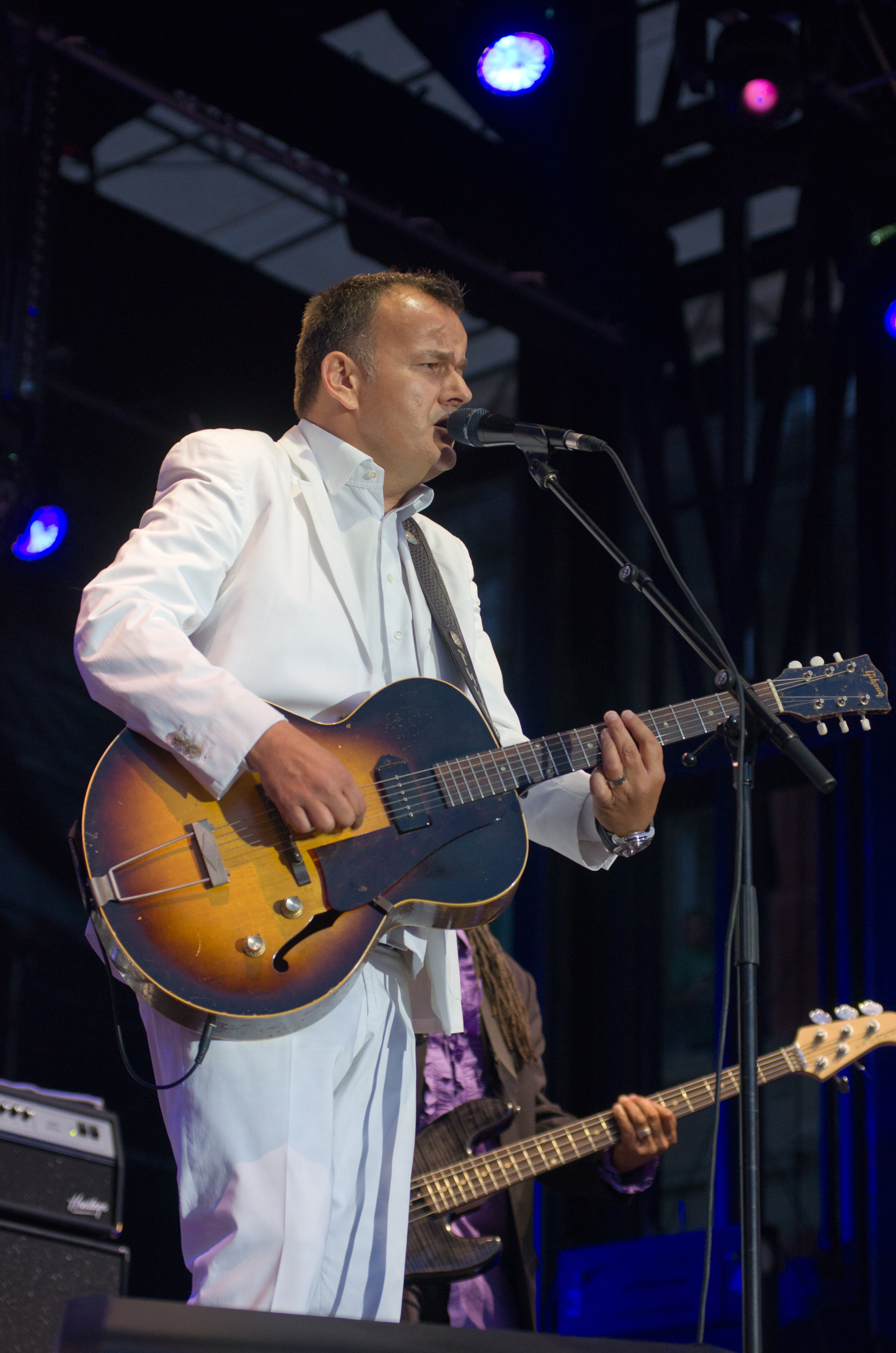
Philipp Fankhauser

Philipp Manuel Fankhauser (born 20 February 1964 in Thun, Switzerland) is a Swiss blues musician and songwriter. Several of his albums have charted in the top ten of the Swiss Hitparade, such as Love Man Riding, which peaked at No. 7, Home, which peaked at No. 2, Try My Love, which peaked at No. 3, and the collaborative live album Unplugged - Live At Mühle Hunziken with Margie Evans, which peaked at No. 4. His album Heebie Jeebies - The Early Songs Of Johnny Copeland jumped straight to number one at the end of 2022.

== Discography ==
=== Albums ===
Year	Title	Record label	Producer	Notes
1989	Blues For The Lady	Funk House Blues Productions	Philipp Fankhauser	with Margie Evans
1991	With A Feeling	Funk House Blues Productions	Philippe Cornu and Hans Raymondaz	
1992	Dedicated	Funk House Blues Productions	Hans Raymondaz	with Walter Liniger
1994	Thun - San Francisco	Funk House Blues Productions	Philipp Fankhauser	with Margie Evans
1995	On Broadway	Funk House Blues Productions	Dennis Walker	with The Memphis Horns and Phillip Walker
1996	His Kind Of Blues	Swiss Radio Int'l / Musica Helvetica	Patrick Linder	
2000	Welcome To The Real World	Funk House Blues Productions	Bobby Kyle	
2003	Live - So Damn Cool	Funk House Blues Productions	Philipp Fankhauser	
2004	Talk To Me	Memphis International Records	Dennis Walker and David Less	
2006	Watching From The Safe Side	Funk House Blues Prod. / Sony Music	Dennis Walker	with The Sweet Inspirations
2008	Love Man Riding	Funk House Blues Prod. / Sony Music	Dennis Walker	with Stephan Eicher
2010	Try My Love	Funk House Blues Prod. / Sony Music	Dennis Walker and Alan Mirikitani	
2013	Plays Montreux Jazz Festival	Funk House Blues Prod. / MJF Prod.	Claude Nobs and Mathieu Jaton for MJF	
2014	Home	Funk House Blues Prod. / Sony Music	Marco Jencarelli	
2016	Unplugged - Live at Mühle Hunziken	Funk House Blues Prod. / Sony Music	Marco Jencarelli	with Margie Evans
2017	I'll Be Around	Funk House Blues Prod. / Sony Music	Dennis Walker and Wolf Stephenson	
2019	Let Life Flow	Funk House Blues Prod. / Sony Music	Kent Bruce	with Kenny Neal
2025	Ain’t That Something	Funk House Blues Prod. / Phonag Records	Kent Bruce	Suisa
