= Marc Sway =

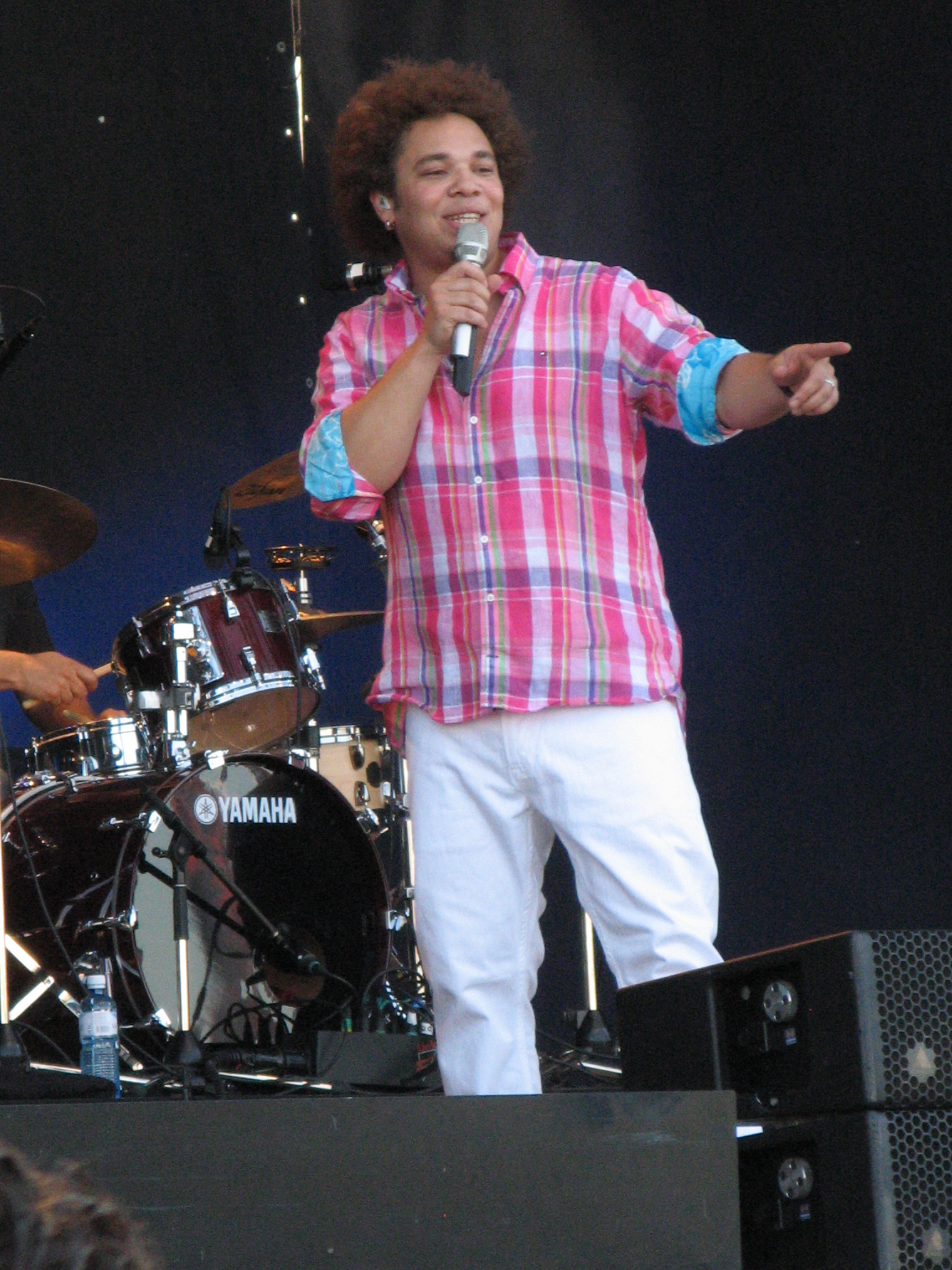

Background information
- Born: Stefan Marc Bachofen; June 25, 1979 (age 47); Männedorf, Zurich, Switzerland
- Genres: Soul, pop
- Occupation: Singer
- Years active: 2002—present
- Label: BMG Ariola

Marc Sway (born 25 June 1979 in Männedorf), is a Swiss soul and pop singer. Since 2003 he has released five albums and from 2013 Sway acts as a juror and vocal coach in the television singing competition The Voice of Switzerland.

== Discography ==
=== Albums ===
- 2003 – Marc's Way
- 2008 – One Way
- 2010 – Tuesday Songs
- 2012 – Soul Circus
- 2014 – Black & White

=== Singles ===
- 2003 – "Natural High"
- 2003 – "Ready for the Ride"
- 2006 – "We're on Fire" (Marc Sway, Daniel Kandlbauer, Kisha & Tanja Dankner)
- 2007 – "Hemmigslos liebe" (Fabienne Louves & Marc Sway)
- 2008 – "Severina"
- 2010 – "Losing"
- 2011 – "Din Engel"
- 2012 – "Non, Non, Non"
- 2014 – "Feel the same"
