= Sven Epiney =

Swiss TV presenter, radio host and editor

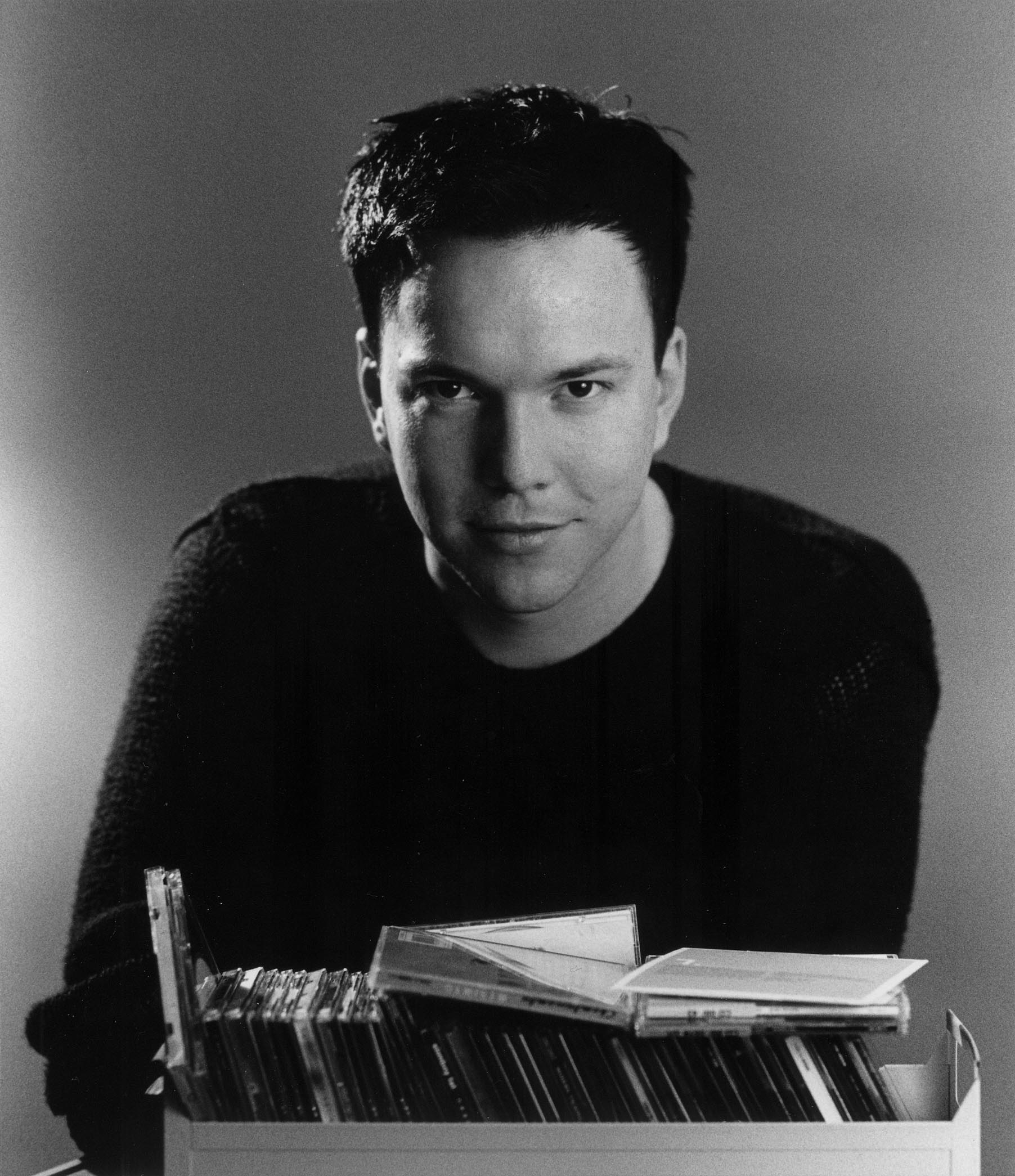
Sven Epiney in 2000

Sven Epiney (born on 14 January 1972 in Naters, Switzerland) is a Swiss TV presenter, radio host and editor, who works for Swiss national television and radio broadcaster SRF. He speaks German, French, English and Italian.

Since 2008 he has been the Swiss German commentator for the Eurovision Song Contest. He also served as the Swiss spokesperson at the 2007 and 2025 contests.

He was the presenter of Miss Switzerland 2010. He was also a member of the jury for the third season of The Greatest Swiss Talents, a show he had previously been the presenter on. In addition, since 2012, he has hosted the morning show quiz "Morgenstund hat Gold im Mund" on Radio SRF 1.

He has been in relationship with Michael Graber since 2011, and the two married in July 2025. Graber has since taken Sven's surname.
