= Stress (musician) =

Estonian-Swiss rapper

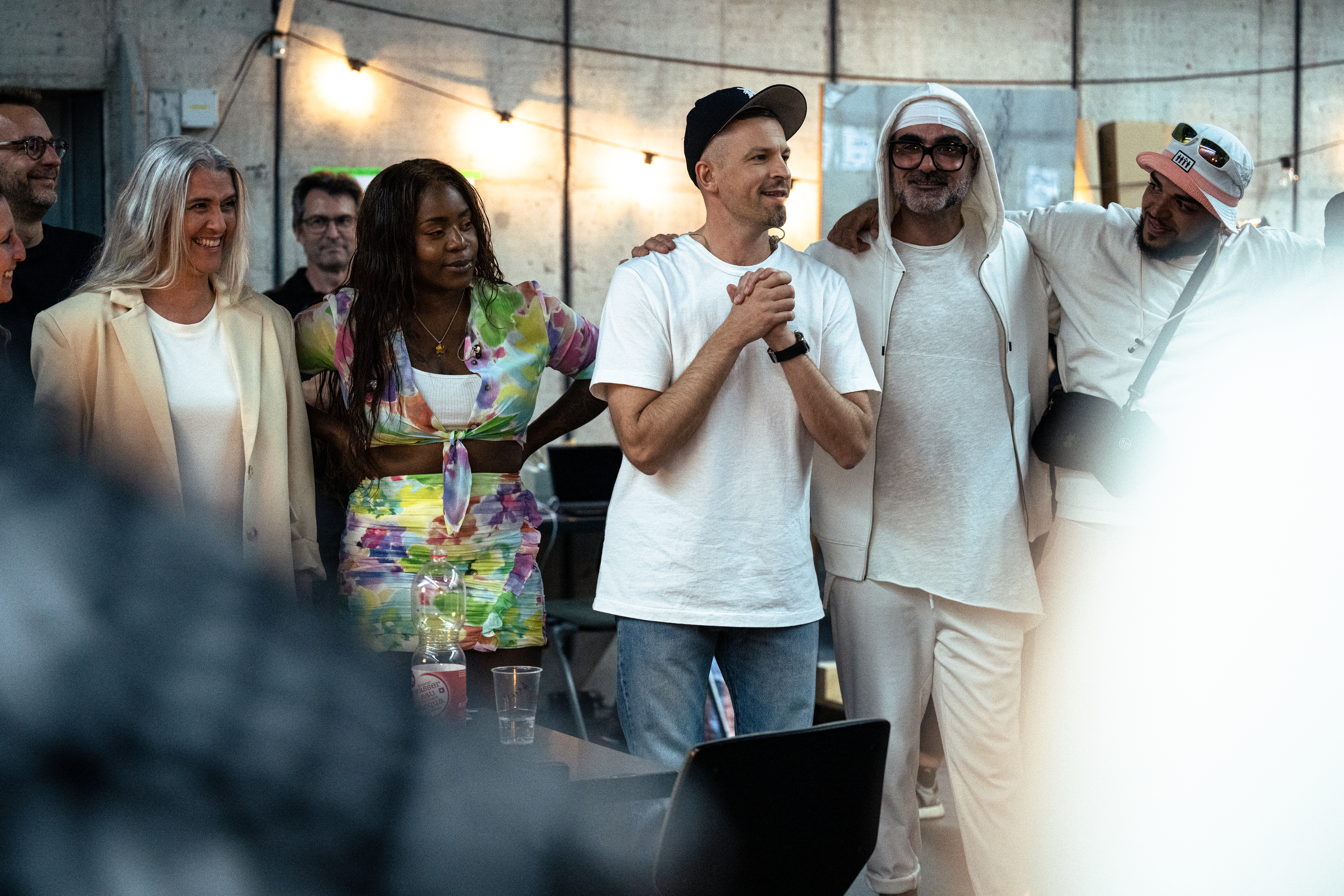
- Stress x MTV Unplugged Backstage

Background information
- Born: Andres Andrekson; July 25, 1977 (age 49); Tallinn, then part of Estonian SSR, Soviet Union
- Genre: Hip-Hop
- Years active: 2003-present
- Label: Universal
- Members: Karolyn

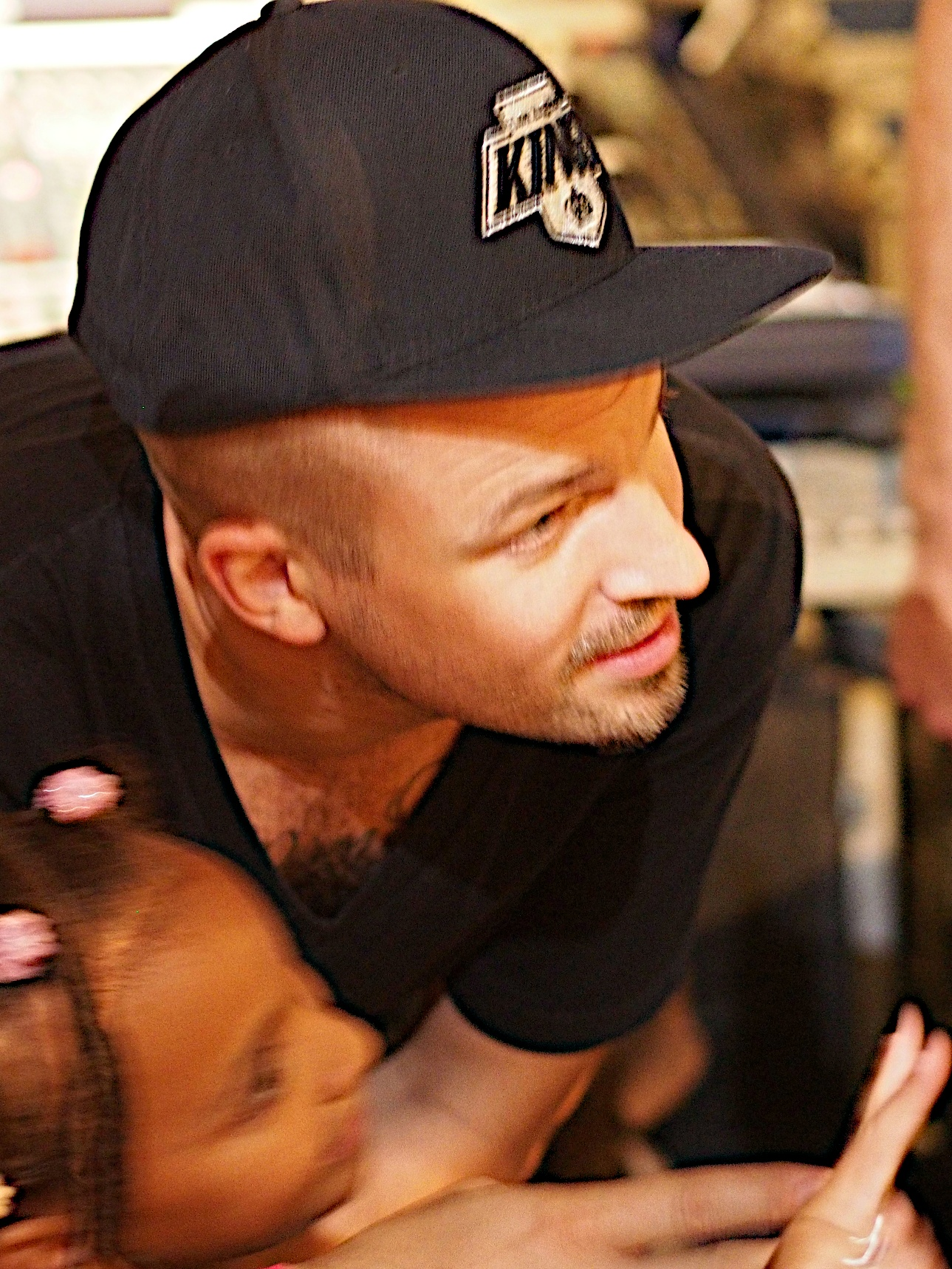
Stress

Stress (born Andres Andrekson on 25 July 1977 in Tallinn) is an Estonian-born Swiss rapper from Lausanne.

He left Estonia in 1989 with his mother when he was 12.

== Music career ==
On 10 February 2003, Stress released his first studio album Billy Bear. On 12 February 2005 the album 25.07.03 was released. Renaissance is the third solo album of Stress. It was released 16 February 2007.

The album Des rois des pions et des fous was his fourth solo project. On 7 October 2011 he released Renaissance II. In 2012, Stress, Pegasus Frontman Noah Veraguth, and Bastian Baker released a joint album called Noël's Room. On 8 March 2013, Stress a best-of album, Golden Greats, with 16 songs. Stress came out 28 November 2014. On 4 October 2019 Sincèrement came out.

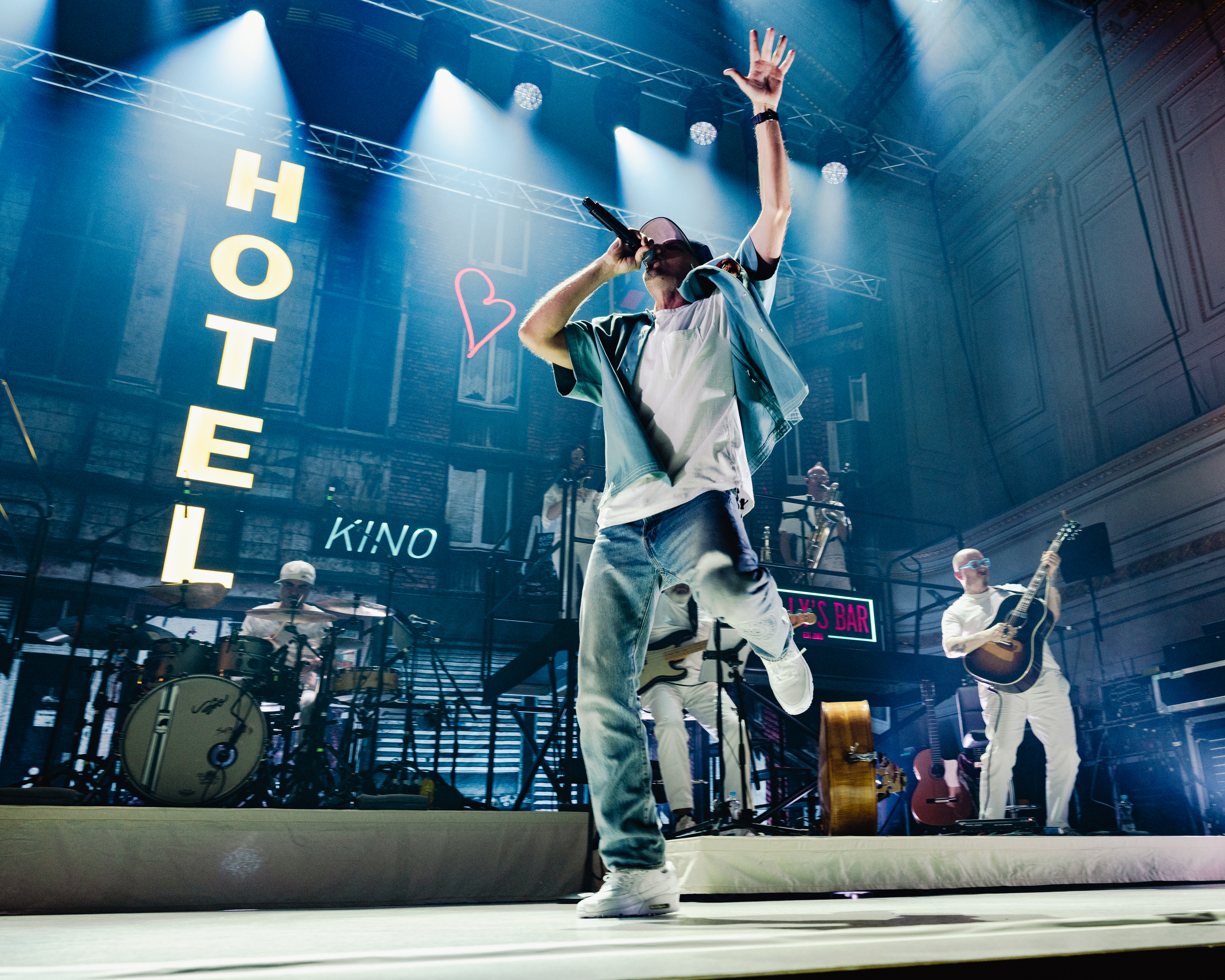
Stress (2024)

Libertad came out 25 February 2022. On 10 November 2023, the MTV Unplugged album came out.

== Discography ==
=== Album ===
Year	Album	Peak chart positions	Album details
2003	Billy Bear	20 (22 weeks)	Released, 10 February 2003
2005	25.07.03	3 (55 weeks)	Released, 12 February 2005
2007	Renaissance	1 (89 weeks)	Released, 16 February 2007
2009	Des rois des pions et des fous	1 (72 weeks)	Released, 3 April 2009
2011	Renaissance II	1 (25 weeks)	Released, 7 October 2011
2012	Noël's Room	1 (20 weeks)	Released, 23 November 2012
2013	Golden Greats	12 (8 weeks)	Released, 8 March 2013
2014	Stress	-	Released, 28 November 2014
2019	Sincèrement	9 (3 weeks)	Released, 4 October 2019
2022	Libertad	5 (5 weeks)	Released, 25 February 2022
2023	MTV Unplugged	1 (6 weeks)	Released, 10 November 2023

=== Singles ===
Year	Single	Peak chart positions	Album details
2004	Si tu aimes	63 (3 weeks)	Released, 7 June 2004 (with Sens Unik & Greis)
2005	Libéré	6 (16 weeks)	Released, 13 August 2005
2007	Avenues	4 (19 weeks)	Released, 26 January 2007
2009	Stahn uf	1 (26 weeks)	Released, 28 June 2009 (with Baschi, Bligg, Ritschi & Seven)
2010	C'est réel	9 (7 weeks)	Released, 20 November 2009
2011	Fuck Stress	70 (1 week)	Released, 7 October 2011

== Filmography ==
- 2004 "Redemption – Früchte des Zorns"
- 2007 "Breakout"
- 2009 "Verso"
- 2022 "Sing meinen Song - Das Schweizer Tauschkonzert"

== Awards ==
- 2008: Swiss Music Awards in the category "Best Song National" for "On n'a qu'une terre"
- 2008: Swiss Music Awards in the category "Best Album Urban National" for "Renaissance"
- 2008: Swiss Music Awards in the category "Best Videoclip National" for "Mais où?"
- 2009: Europe Music Awards in the category "Best Swiss Act"
- 2009: Fischhof-Preis
- 2010: Swiss Music Awards in the category "Best Song National" for "Tous les mêmes" (with Karolyn)
- 2010: Swiss Music Awards in the category "Best Album Urban National" for "Des rois, des pions et des fous"
- 2012: Swiss Music Awards in the category "Best Album Urban National" for "Renaissance II"
- 2013: Swiss Music Awards in the category "Best Album Urban National" for "Noël’s Room"
- 2013: Swiss Music Awards in the category "Best Live Act National"
- 2015: Swiss Music Awards in the category "Best Act Romandie"

== Web links ==
- Offizielle Webseite
- Stress bei Facebook
- Stress bei Instagram
- Stress bei TikTok
