= Switzerland in the Eurovision Song Contest 2023 =

- Eurovision Song Contest 2023
- Participating broadcaster: Swiss Broadcasting Corporation (SRG SSR)
- Country: Switzerland
- Selection process: Internal selection
- Announcement date: Artist: 20 February 2023; Song: 7 March 2023

Competing entry
- Song: "Watergun"
- Artist: Remo Forrer
- Songwriters: Argyle Singh; Ashley Hicklin; Mikołaj Trybulec

Placement
- Semi-final result: Qualified (7th, 97 points)
- Final result: 20th, 92 points

Participation chronology

Switzerland was represented at the Eurovision Song Contest 2023 with the song "Watergun", written by Argyle Singh, Ashley Hicklin, and Mikołaj Trybulec, and performed by Remo Forrer. The Swiss participating broadcaster, the Swiss Broadcasting Corporation (SRG SSR), internally selected its entry for the contest.

Switzerland were drawn to compete in the first semi-final on 9 May and qualified to the grand final, ultimately placing 20th with 92 points.

== Background ==
Prior to the 2023 contest, Switzerland had participated in the Eurovision Song Contest sixty-two times since its first entry in 1956. Switzerland is noted for having won the first edition of the Eurovision Song Contest with the song "Refrain" performed by Lys Assia. Their second and, to this point, most recent victory was achieved in 1988 when Canadian singer Céline Dion won the contest with the song "Ne partez pas sans moi". Following the introduction of semi-finals for the 2004, Switzerland had managed to participate in the final four times up to this point. In 2005, the internal selection of Estonian girl band Vanilla Ninja, performing the song "Cool Vibes", qualified Switzerland to the final where they placed 8th. Due to their successful result in 2005, Switzerland was pre-qualified to compete directly in the final in 2006. Between 2007 and 2010, the nation failed to qualify to the final after a string of internal selections. Opting to organize a national final between 2011 and 2018, Switzerland has managed to qualify to the final twice out of the last eight years. After returning to an internal selection in 2019, Switzerland has managed to qualify to the final in all contests they participated in and yielded two top five results. In 2022, "Boys Do Cry" performed by Marius Bear qualified for the final and finished 17th.

The Swiss national broadcaster, Swiss Broadcasting Corporation (SRG SSR), broadcasts the event within Switzerland and organises the selection process for the nation's entry. SRG SSR confirmed their intentions to participate at the Eurovision Song Contest 2023 on 12 July 2022. Along with their participation confirmation, the broadcaster announced that the Swiss entry for the 2023 contest would be selected internally. Switzerland has selected their entry for the Eurovision Song Contest through both national finals and internal selections in the past. Between 2011 and 2018, the broadcaster has opted to organize a national final in order to select their entry. Since 2019, the Swiss entry was internally selected for the competition.

== Before Eurovision ==
=== Internal selection ===
SRG SSR opened a submission period between 25 August 2022 and 8 September 2022 for interested artists and composers to submit their entries. Artists and songwriters of any nationality were able to submit songs; however those with a Swiss passport or residency were given priority. Songs shortlisted from the received submissions were then tested by their music producers with various artists and the combination of a 100-member public panel (50%) and the votes of a 23-member international expert jury (50%) selected the Swiss entry. The members of the public panel were Swiss residents put together according to selected criteria in cooperation with Digame, while the international jury consisted of members who had been national juries for their respective countries at the Eurovision Song Contest.

Remo Forrer was announced as the Swiss entrant for the contest on 20 February 2023. Forrer had previously participated in and won both the third season of the Swiss reality singing competition The Voice of Switzerland and one episode of German music game I Can See Your Voice. Forrer's song for the contest, "Watergun", was revealed on 7 March 2023.

== At Eurovision ==
According to Eurovision rules, all nations with the exceptions of the host country and the "Big Five" (France, Germany, Italy, Spain and the United Kingdom) are required to qualify from one of two semi-finals in order to compete for the final; the top ten countries from each semi-final progress to the final. The European Broadcasting Union (EBU) split up the competing countries into five different pots based on voting patterns from previous contests, with countries with favourable voting histories put into the same pot. On 31 January 2023, an allocation draw was held which placed each country into one of the two semi-finals, and determined which half of the show they would perform in. Switzerland was placed into the first semi-final, which will be held on 9 May 2023, and has been scheduled to perform in the second half of the show.

Once all the competing songs for the 2023 contest had been released, the running order for the semi-finals was decided by the shows' producers rather than through another draw, so that similar songs were not placed next to each other. Switzerland was set to perform in position 8, following the entry from Croatia and before the entry from Israel.

At the end of the show, Switzerland was announced as a qualifier for the final.

=== Voting ===
==== Points awarded to Switzerland ====
Points awarded to Switzerland (Semi-final 1)
Score	Televote
12 points	
10 points	
8 points	Finland; Germany; Netherlands; Norway; Sweden
7 points	Azerbaijan; Ireland; Moldova
6 points	France; Malta
5 points	Czech Republic; Portugal
4 points	Israel; Italy
3 points	Latvia
2 points	Croatia
1 point	Serbia

Points awarded to Switzerland (Final)
Score	Televote	Jury
12 points		
10 points		Finland
8 points	Sweden	
7 points		Albania
6 points		Malta; Netherlands; Sweden
5 points	Norway	
4 points	Denmark; Estonia	Austria; Azerbaijan; Italy
3 points	Germany	France
2 points	Armenia; Austria	Cyprus; Greece; Norway; Poland; Portugal
1 point	Azerbaijan; Finland; Italy	Slovenia

==== Points awarded by Switzerland ====
Points awarded by Switzerland (Semi-final 1)
Score	Televote
12 points	Portugal
10 points	Finland
8 points	Sweden
7 points	Israel
6 points	Serbia
5 points	Croatia
4 points	Czech Republic
3 points	Norway
2 points	Moldova
1 point	Ireland

Points awarded by Switzerland (Final)
Score	Televote	Jury
12 points	Albania	Czech Republic
10 points	Italy	Estonia
8 points	Finland	Italy
7 points	Portugal	Austria
6 points	Croatia	Sweden
5 points	Sweden	Armenia
4 points	Germany	Norway
3 points	Israel	Spain
2 points	Norway	Australia
1 point	Serbia	Israel

==== Detailed voting results ====
The following members comprised the Swiss jury:

- Benjamin Jon Alasu
- Mauro Rossi
- Thierry Epiney
- Roxane Lara Debora Ischi
- Zoë Kressler

Detailed voting results from Switzerland (Semi-final 1)
R/O	Country	Televote	
R/O	Country	Rank	Points
01	Norway	8	3
02	Malta	14	
03	Serbia	5	6
04	Latvia	13	
05	Portugal	1	12
06	Ireland	10	1
07	Croatia	6	5
08	Switzerland		
09	Israel	4	7
10	Moldova	9	2
11	Sweden	3	8
12	Azerbaijan	12	
13	Czech Republic	7	4
14	Netherlands	11	
15	Finland	2	10

Detailed voting results from Switzerland (Final)
R/O	Country	Jury							Televote	
R/O	Country	Juror 1	Juror 2	Juror 3	Juror 4	Juror 5	Rank	Points	Rank	Points
01	Austria	1	8	7	3	5	4	7	11	
02	Portugal	11	12	21	11	7	14		4	7
03	Switzerland									
04	Poland	15	18	18	14	23	21		19	
05	Serbia	23	16	16	6	17	17		10	1
06	France	8	23	15	13	11	16		14	
07	Cyprus	5	14	17	16	12	13		15	
08	Spain	19	3	4	25	8	8	3	20	
09	Sweden	2	5	13	12	4	5	6	6	5
10	Albania	22	11	12	21	15	20		1	12
11	Italy	21	1	2	2	13	3	8	2	10
12	Estonia	7	6	14	1	1	2	10	22	
13	Finland	25	9	19	23	6	15		3	8
14	Czech Republic	12	7	1	4	2	1	12	17	
15	Australia	3	17	8	7	20	9	2	21	
16	Belgium	18	21	6	8	14	12		13	
17	Armenia	13	2	3	22	10	6	5	24	
18	Moldova	9	20	10	15	16	18		16	
19	Ukraine	4	15	11	5	22	11		12	
20	Norway	20	4	9	9	3	7	4	9	2
21	Germany	17	24	25	24	21	24		7	4
22	Lithuania	10	13	22	10	18	19		18	
23	Israel	6	10	5	17	9	10	1	8	3
24	Slovenia	14	19	24	18	19	22		23	
25	Croatia	24	25	23	20	25	25		5	6
26	United Kingdom	16	22	20	19	24	23		25	
