= Sedato =

Iranian television game show

- Persian: صداتو
- Literally: Your voice
- Genre: Game show
- Based on: I Can See Your Voice by CJ ENM
- Directed by: Hamed Javadzadeh; Seyed Mahdi Saeedi
- Presented by: Mohsen Kiaei (1–2); Siamak Ansari (3)
- Starring: The celebrity panelists (see cast)
- Narrated by: Hamed Javadzadeh
- Country of origin: Iran
- Original language: Persian
- No. of seasons: 3
- No. of episodes: Regular: 33; Special: 9; Overall: 42

Production
- Producer: Hamed Javadzadeh
- Camera setup: Multi-camera
- Running time: Flexible

Original release
- Network: Filimo
- Release: 31 May 2023 – 26 June 2025

Related
- I Can See Your Voice franchise

Sedato (Persian: صداتو) is an Iranian television mystery music game show based on the South Korean programme I Can See Your Voice, featuring its format where a guest artist and a contestant attempt to eliminate bad singers from the group, until the last mystery singer remains for a duet performance. It first aired on Filimo on 31 May 2023.

== Gameplay ==
=== Format ===
Over the course of several rounds, the guest artist and contestant must attempt to eliminate bad singers from a group of six "mystery singers", identified only by their occupation or alias, without ever hearing them perform live. They are assisted by clues regarding the singers' backgrounds, style of performance, and observations from a celebrity panel. At the end of a game, the last remaining mystery singer is revealed as either good or bad by means of a duet between them and one of the guest artists. (Note: Gameplay notes: Since the 2nd season, returning good singers from previous seasons are technically included as guest artists, assigning on duet performance duties.; Also, the winning mystery singer can perform freely without accompanying guest artist(s) for a duet; this was introduced when bad singer Kim Joo-young did in the original South Korean 8th season.; The number of rounds are set to three (for the 2nd season) or four (for the 1st season).; If the last remaining mystery singer is good, the contestant wins IR200 million (for the 1st season), IR300 million (for the 2nd season), or IR400 million (for the 3rd season).; As per eliminated bad singer, the contestant gets IR20 million (for the 1st season), IR40 million (for the 2nd season) or IR60 million (for the 3rd season).)

The contestant must eliminate one mystery singer at the end of each round, receiving a petty cash if they eliminate a bad singer. At the end of a game, if the contestant decides to walk away, they will keep the money had won in previous rounds; if they decide to risk for the last remaining mystery singer, they win its main prize if a singer is good, or lose their all winnings if a singer is bad.

=== Rounds ===
==== Lip sync round ====
Each mystery singer performs a lip sync to a song; good singers mime to a recording of their own, while bad singers mime to a recording by someone else. At the conclusion of performances, the contestant eliminates one mystery singer from each group.

- Lip sync (Persian: لیپ سینک)
  - s1: Six mystery singers are divided into two groups of trios, and each of them would have to perform lip sync individually.
  - s2–3: Six mystery singers are divided into pairs, in which each compete a lip sync battle against each other.

==== Evidence round ====
- Unlock (Persian: آنلاک)

s1: The contestant is presented with a video package containing possible clues by one of the mystery singers.

==== Rehearsal round ====
- Secret studio (Persian: استودیو مخفی)

s1–3: The contestant is presented with four people inside separate recording session podiums, but pitch-shifted to obscure their actual vocals.

==== Interrogation round ====
- Question and answer (Persian: سین جیم)

s1–3: The contestant may ask questions to the remaining mystery singers. Good singers are required to give truthful responses, while the bad singers must lie.

== Production ==
In May 2023, Sabaidea formally acquired the rights to produce an Iranian adaptation of I Can See Your Voice; the series' title Sedato, which translates to English as "your voice", is a "shortening" of the South Korean programme of the same title (Persian: من میتونم صداتو ببینم, romanized: Man mí-tunam sedato bebinam).

== Broadcast history ==
Sedato debuted on 31 May 2023. (Note: Despite the recognition, some earlier releases were occurred: Giọng ải giọng ai extended its 4th season by adding 11 episodes through streaming after the linear television broadcasts concluded on 2 November 2019.; The German 3rd season originally released its second set of episodes on RTL+ before the actual linear television airings on 20, 27 August, and 3 September 2022.) However, the first season finale originally scheduled for 6 September 2023, was pushed back later to 20 September 2023, presumably due to the first death anniversary of Mahsa Amini.

While the first season airings are preempted during Muharram, Filimo has already renewed the series for a second season, which premiered on 21 March 2024. Other games that have played include contestant Javad Hashemi in his "appreciation day" game with guest artist Ali Eyazkhani on 11 April 2024, Saman Ehteshami in the pairs special with Sadegh Nikokalam on 9 May 2024, Kianoush Gerami in a Tribute to the Luti People special with Hassan Zafar on 20 June 2024, and Mohammad Ghadimi in the Musical Geniuses special with Reza Khatamian on 27 June 2024. (Note: Highlights: In the 2nd season, football player and coach Ali Parvin and (host) Mohsen Kiaei's daughter Roza made their guesting appearances.; The 4th special episode of its 3rd season, dubbed as Paradox, displays reversed color designations on good or bad singers, meaning for "good is bad" or "bad is good".; In the Persian Made special (of its 3rd season), (panelist) Amir Mahdi Jule's daughter Gandam made her guesting appearance.)

One week after second season finale, panelist Shabnam Moghaddami formally announced in July 2024 that the series was renewed for a third season, which premiered on 3 March 2025. Other games that have played include a kids special with guest artist Ilya Gravand on 10 March 2025, contestant Jalal Tehrani on his "appreciation day" game with Hadi Azizi on 17 March 2025, Mir-Taher Mazloomi in a Persian Wedding special with Mohammad Guderzifar on 31 March 2025, Liana Sharifian in a Paradox special with Sinai Rasouli on 21 April 2025, and Ali Osivand in a Persian Made special with Hossein Ghahari that originally scheduled to conclude on 16 June 2025 and later pushed back to ten days, thus surpassing the twelve-day war ceasefire.

Five days after third season finale, a post from Sedato's official Instagram page announced the auditions for an upcoming fourth season.

== Cast ==
The series employs a panel of celebrity "detectives" who assist the guest artist and contestant in identifying good and bad mystery singers throughout the game. Overall, six celebrities have served as panelists, with their original lineup consisting of Mohammad Bahrani, Amir Mahdi Jule, Shabnam Moghaddami, and Mohsen Sharifian. Later members who joined the group's duties also include Elika Abdolrazzaghi and Mohammad Alizadeh — from the 2nd season.

Designations:
H Hosting duties
g# Total games attended, by panelists

Cast member	Seasons			
Cast member	1	2	3	4
Mohsen Kiaei	H	H		TBA
Mohammad Bahrani	12	15	15	TBA
Amir Mahdi Jule	12	15	15	TBA
Shabnam Moghaddami	12	15		TBA
Mohsen Sharifian	12	15	15	TBA
Siamak Ansari			H	TBA
Elika Abdolrazzaghi			15	TBA

== Series overview ==
Series	Episodes	Originally released		Good singers	Bad singers
Series	Episodes	First released	Last released	Good singers	Bad singers
1	12	31 May 2023	20 September 2023	6	6
2	11	21 March 2024	4 July 2024	7	4
3	10	3 March 2025	9 June 2025	4	6
Sp	9	11 April 2024	26 June 2025	5	4
