= List of Sedato episodes =

Television game show episode list

About the series
- Sedato is an Iranian television mystery music game show broadcast by Filimo, featuring its format based on the South Korean programme I Can See Your Voice. (Note: Gameplay notes: Since the 2nd season, returning good singers from previous seasons are technically included as guest artists, assigning on duet performance duties.; Also, the winning mystery singer can perform freely without accompanying guest artist(s) for a duet; this was introduced when bad singer Kim Joo-young did in the original South Korean 8th season.)
- More about the series

Episodes overview
- Total episode(s): 42
- Aired episode(s): 33
- Special episode(s): 9

The Iranian television mystery music game show Sedato (Persian: صداتو; transl. Your voice) has played a total of three seasons and 42 episodes; broadcasting on Filimo from 31 May 2023 (Note: Despite the recognition, some earlier releases were occurred: Giọng ải giọng ai extended its 4th season by adding 11 episodes through streaming after the linear television broadcasts concluded on 2 November 2019.; The German 3rd season originally released its second set of episodes on RTL+ before the actual linear television airings on 20, 27 August, and 3 September 2022.) to 26 June 2025.

== Series overview ==
| Series | Episodes | Originally released | | Good singers | Bad singers |
| Series | Episodes | First released | Last released | Good singers | Bad singers |
|---|---|---|---|---|---|
| 1 | 12 | 31 May 2023 | 20 September 2023 | 6 | 6 |
| 2 | 11 | 21 March 2024 | 4 July 2024 | 7 | 4 |
| 3 | 10 | 3 March 2025 | 9 June 2025 | 4 | 6 |
| Sp | 9 | 11 April 2024 | 26 June 2025 | 5 | 4 |

== Episodes ==
=== Season 1 (2023) ===
List of season 1 episodes
| No. overall | No. in season | Contestant | Original release date |
|---|---|---|---|
| 1 | 1 | Rana Zargarzadeh | 31 May 2023 |
| 2 | 2 | Merdad Rashid Yaghan | 7 June 2023 |
| 3 | 3 | Maryam Mahor | 14 June 2023 |
| 4 | 4 | Milad Forutanian | 21 June 2023 |
| 5 | 5 | Aida Naderi | 28 June 2023 |
| 6 | 6 | Roya Karimah | 5 July 2023 |
| 7 | 7 | Seyed Moradi | 12 July 2023 |
| 8 | 8 | Rehane Agha Kathiri | 9 August 2023 |
| 9 | 9 | Omid Mashoudfar | 16 August 2023 |
| 10 | 10 | Irfan Abbas Nejad | 23 August 2023 |
| 11 | 11 | Safida Aghamirzadeh | 30 August 2023 |
| 12 | 12 | Shayan Muradnizab | 20 September 2023 |

=== Season 2 (2024) ===
List of season 2 episodes
| No. overall | No. in season | Guest artist(s) | Player order (Note: It refers to the guest artist(s) that have played in according to their first game; returning guest artists (which also include foreigners or former good singers), with their names displaying in italics) are not counted.) | Contestant | Original release date |
|---|---|---|---|---|---|
| 13 | 1 | Mohammad Haghighi | 1 | Gharibe Hassanpour | 21 March 2024 |
| 14 | 2 | Ali Eyazkhani | — | Maria Sakhi | 28 March 2024 |
| 15 | 3 | Mahdi Faramarz | — | Sohail Ghasemi | 4 April 2024 |
| 16 | 4 | Ali Behrati | — | Mohammad Mandadi | 18 April 2024 |
| 17 | 5 | Amin Shokohi | — | Mahin Banawabonsari | 25 April 2024 |
| 18 | 6 | Mohammad Tawakli | — | Ramissa Hashemi | 2 May 2024 |
| 19 | 7 | Amir Reza Pahlavan | — | Asal Rezaei | 16 May 2024 |
| 20 | 8 | Mashid Najibzadeh | — | Pouria Mortazavi | 30 May 2024 |
| 21 | 9 | Misham Karimi | — | Hormuz Kehsani | 6 June 2024 |
| 22 | 10 | Taha Mamorzadeh | — | Asmah Shemazdeh | 13 June 2024 |
| 23 | 11 | Hossein Jafari | — | Nahid Hamzah | 4 July 2024 |

=== Season 3 (2025) ===
List of season 3 episodes
| No. overall | No. in season | Guest artist(s) | Player order | Contestant | Original release date |
|---|---|---|---|---|---|
| 24 | 1 | Farnam Kamali | — | Seyed Sajjad Pajour | 3 March 2025 |
| 25 | 2 | Ali Eyazkhani | — | Hamed Hadian | 7 April 2025 |
| 26 | 3 | Amir Mohammed Kamirpour | — | Akhil Royinbagh | 14 April 2025 |
| 27 | 4 | Mohsen Kerami | — | Mohammad Mehdi Ashayeri | 1 May 2025 |
| 28 | 5 | Abulfazl Kalagher | — | Yaseman Rahmani | 1 May 2025 |
| 29 | 6 | Pajhwok Pakzad | — | Mehdi Soleimani | 12 May 2025 |
| 30 | 7 | Nasser Mousavi | — | Sherin Kalaghti | 19 May 2025 |
| 31 | 8 | Matin Davoudi | — | Leyla Bemniri | 26 May 2025 |
| 32 | 9 | Amir Mehdi Ghasemi | — | Mohsen Eshaghabadi | 2 June 2025 |
| 33 | 10 | Reza Aghajan | — | Kiana Rabonik | 9 June 2025 |

== Specials ==
List of special episodes
| No. | Title | Guest artist(s) (Note: Highlights: In the 2nd season, football player and coach Ali Parvin and (host) Mohsen Kiaei's daughter Roza made their guesting appearances.; The 4th special episode of its 3rd season, dubbed as Paradox, displays reversed color designations on good or bad singers, meaning for "good is bad" or "bad is good".; In the Persian Made special (of its 3rd season), (panelist) Amir Mahdi Jule's daughter Gandam made her guesting appearance.) | Player order | Contestant | Original release date |
|---|---|---|---|---|---|
| 1 | "Javad Hashemi Appreciation Day" | Ali Eyazkhani | — | Javad Hashemi | 11 April 2024 |
| 2 | "Pairs special" | Sadegh Nikokalam | — | Saman Ehteshami | 9 May 2024 |
| 3 | "Tribute to the Luti People" | Hassan Zafar | — | Kianoush Gerami | 20 June 2024 |
| 4 | "Musical Geniuses" | Reza Khatamian | — | Mohammad Ghadimi | 27 June 2024 |
| 5 | "Kids special" | Ilya Gravand | — | Nazanin Hakimifar | 10 March 2025 |
| 6 | "Jalal Tehrani Appreciation Day" | Hadi Azizi | — | Jalal Tehrani | 17 March 2025 |
| 7 | "Persian Wedding" | Mohammad Guderzifar | — | Mir-Taher Mazloomi | 31 March 2025 |
| 8 | "Paradox" | Sinai Rasouli | — | Liana Sharifian | 21 April 2025 |
| 9 | "Persian Made" | Hossein Ghahari | — | Ali Osivand | 26 June 2025 |
