= Sedato season 1 =

Television game show season

Sedato
- Season 1
- Starring: Mohammad Bahrani; Amir Mahdi Jule; Shabnam Moghaddami; Mohsen Sharifian
- Hosted by: Mohsen Kiaei
- Winners: Good singers: 6; Bad singers: 6
- No. of episodes: 12

Release
- Original network: Filimo
- Original release: 31 May – 20 September 2023

Season chronology
- Next → Season 2

The first season of the Iranian television mystery music game show Sedato premiered on Filimo on 31 May 2023. (Note: Despite the recognition, some earlier releases were occurred: Giọng ải giọng ai extended its 4th season by releasing 11 unaired episodes on various YouTube channels, after the tentative [15th episode] finale on 2 November 2019.; The German 3rd season originally released its second set of episodes on RTL+ before the actual linear television airings on 20, 27 August, and 3 September 2022.)

== Gameplay ==
=== Format ===
According to the original South Korean rules, the contestant must attempt to eliminate bad singers during its game phase. At the final performance, the last remaining mystery singer is revealed as either good or bad by simply performing itself.

The contestant must eliminate one mystery singer at the end of each round, receiving IR20 million if they eliminate a bad singer. At the end of a game, if the contestant decides to walk away, they will keep the money had won in previous rounds; if they decide to risk for the last remaining mystery singer, they win IR200 million if a singer is good, or lose their all winnings if a singer is bad.

=== Rounds ===
1. Lip sync (Persian: لیپ سینک)
  Six mystery singers are divided into two groups of trios, and each of them would have to perform lip sync individually.
2. Unlock (Persian: آنلاک)
  The contestant is presented with a video package containing possible clues by one of the mystery singers.
3. Secret studio (Persian: استودیو مخفی)
  The contestant is presented with four people inside separate recording session podiums, but pitch-shifted to obscure their actual vocals.
4. Question and answer (Persian: سین جیم)
  The contestant may ask questions to the remaining mystery singers. Good singers are required to give truthful responses, while the bad singers must lie.

== Episodes ==
Legend:
Good singer
Bad singer
— The contestant chose to risk the money.
— The contestant chose to walk away with the money.

Episode		Contestant	Mystery singers (In their respective numbers and aliases) (Note: Players' note: For the mixed groups, names who identified as bad singers are displayed in italics.)					
#	Date	Contestant	Elimination order					Winner
#	Date	Contestant	Lip sync		Unlock	Secret studio	Question and answer	Winner
1	31 May 2023	Rana Zargarzadeh → IR0	3. Mashid Najibzadeh; (Musical Composer)	4. Jan Abbasi; (Organic Farmer)	5. Mahsi Abad; (Mascot)	3. Mohammad Sohri; (Boxer)	1. Hossein Haider; (Clown)	2. Valaish Gholipour; Model
2	7 June 2023	Merdad Rashid Yaghan → IR60,000,000	3. Sohail Noushadian; (Skier)	4. Alireza Ashadi; (Bodybuilder)	5. Niahli Aziz; (Fisherman)	6. Amin Shohkohi; (Public Relations Manager)	1. Amir Reza Pahlavan; (Zoorkhaneh Wrestler)	2. Reza Golmohammadi; Fruit Vendor
3	14 June 2023	Maryam Mahor → IR200,000,000	2. Amin Pahorjash; (Guitarist)	5. Hossein Jafari; (Freestyle Wrestler)	6. Danial Zafar; (Garbage Collector)	4. Asghar Hossein; (Storyteller)	3. Subhan Safamanesh; (Fish Vendor)	1. Maziar Hisan; Fastfood Manager
4	21 June 2023	Milad Forutanian → IR0	3. Syed Saif Jamal; (Butcher)	6. Kaziri Bashkordan; (Waiter)	4. Hamed Najaf; (Motorcycle Rider)	2. Ahmad Salar Javaheri; (Violinist)	1. Ismail Janjal; (Dental Student)	5. Fardin Ahmadi; Bank Employee
5	28 June 2023	Aida Naderi → IR200,000,000	3. Syed Ahmad Khan; (Tour Guide)	6. Seyed Amir Hossein; (Poet)	5. Farid Shirmohammadzadeh; (Athletics Champion)	2. Mehran Tagvi; (Firefighter)	4. Mohammad Tawakli; (Coal Worker)	1. Reza Khatamian; Welder
6	5 July 2023	Roya Karimah → IR80,000,000	3. Alireza Zainabad; (Teacher)	6. Farzad Dashti; (Balloon Vendor)	1. Seyyed Afshin Hossein; (Engine Repairman)	4. Hassan Zafar; (Baker)	2. Syed Shiari; (Archivist)	5. Mehran Lotfullah; Theatre Actor
7	12 July 2023	Seyed Moradi → IR200,000,000	1. Alireza Bihatian; (Graphic Designer)	6. Atef Aghajan; (Taekwondo Champion)	5. Mahan Ali Panah; (Fencer)	4. Mohammad Karaj; (Goldsmith)	2. Mohammad Shekian; (Footballer)	3. Ali Behrati; Doctor
8	9 August 2023	Rehane Agha Kathiri → IR0	1. Mehran Dehghan; (Dammam Player)	6. Poya Farhan; (Comedian)	4. Amir Salar Dadashnejad; (Mechanical Student)	5. Kian Shafi Khan; (Hairdresser)	3. Mahdi Faramarz; (Sports Club Owner)	2. Keyvan Kariah; Police Trainee
9	16 August 2023	Omid Mashoudfar → IR200,000,000	2. Subhan al-Shehri; (Gasoline Boy)	4. Morteza Farzanfar; (Stuntman)	5. Keyvan Khatai; (Actor)	6. Alireza Khaliq; (Disposable Tableware Salesman)	3. Alireza Esfandir; (Falafel Chef)	1. Subhan Mankashef; Pianist
10	23 August 2023	Irfan Abbas Nejad → IR60,000,000	1. Mohammad Suri; (Red Crescent Volunteer)	5. Behrouz Goder; (Animator)	2. Taha Mamorzadeh; (Kung Fu Practitioner)	4. Hossein Taherzadeh; (Bookworm)	3. Hossein Kusharz; (Gamer)	6. Javid Mohebati; Podcaster
11	30 August 2023	Safida Aghamirzadeh → IR200,000,000	3. Mobin Azadi; (Laboratory Manager)	5. Shayan Ramadhan; (Automotive Painter)	4. Farzan Filasfim; (Robotics Club Member)	6. Ali Eyazkhani; (Construction Worker)	2. Seyyed Danial Hossein; (Chaffeur's Apprentice)	1. Sadegh Nikokalam; Motorcycle Courier
12	20 September 2023	Shayan Muradnizab → IR200,000,000	2. Sorouz Sataesh; (Student)	6. Misham Karimi; (Motorcycle Rider)	5. Seyed Arad Hosseini; (Factory Guard)	4. Amir Roshan; (Medical Supply Assistant)	1. Mohammed Reza Mohebi; (Magician)	2. Syed Shakur; Carpenter
