= Watergun (song) =

2023 song by Remo Forrer

Single by Remo Forrer

from the EP Favorite Kind of Lonely
- Language: English
- Released: 7 March 2023
- Genre: Pop
- Length: 2:52
- Label: Manifester Music
- Songwriters: Argyle Singh; Ashley Hicklin; Mikołaj Trybulec
- Producers: Mikołaj Trybulec; Pele Loriano; Tom Oehler

Remo Forrer singles chronology
| "Out Loud" (2022) | "Watergun" (2023) | "Not Okay" (2023) |

Music video
- "Watergun" on YouTube

Eurovision Song Contest 2023 entry
- Country: Switzerland
- Artist: Remo Forrer
- Language: English
- Composers: Argyle Singh; Ashley Hicklin; Mikołaj Trybulec
- Lyricists: Argyle Singh; Ashley Hicklin; Mikołaj Trybulec

Finals performance
- Semi-final result: 7th
- Semi-final points: 97
- Final result: 20th
- Final points: 92

Entry chronology
- ◄ "Boys Do Cry" (2022)
- "The Code" (2024) ►

Official performance video
- "Watergun" (First Semi-Final) on YouTube "Watergun" (Grand Final) on YouTube

"Watergun" is a song by Swiss singer Remo Forrer, released as a single on 7 March 2023. The song represented Switzerland in the Eurovision Song Contest 2023 after being internally selected by SRG SSR, Switzerland's broadcaster for the Eurovision Song Contest. The song reached number two in Switzerland.

== Background ==
The song is described as a power ballad "about powerlessness in the face of conflicts in this world." In an article, Forrer said: "My generation has to live with the consequences of decisions that we didn't make. It's frustrating, but I still have hope that changes are possible." The song is further described as an appeal for peace.

== Release ==
The music video for the song was released on 7 March 2023 on the official YouTube channel of the Eurovision Song Contest. The song was also released on digital platforms on the same day.

== Eurovision Song Contest ==
=== Selection ===
SRG SSR opened a submission period between 25 August 2022 and 8 September 2022 for interested artists and composers to submit their entries. Artists and songwriters of any nationality were able to submit songs; however those with a Swiss passport or residency were given priority. Songs shortlisted from the received submissions were then tested by their music producers with various artists and the combination of a 100-member public panel (50%) and the votes of a 23-member international expert jury (50%) selected the Swiss entry. The members of the public panel were Swiss residents put together according to selected criteria in cooperation with Digame, while the international jury consisted of members who had been national juries for their respective countries at the Eurovision Song Contest.

Remo Forrer was announced as the Swiss entrant for the contest on 20 February 2023. Forrer had previously participated in and won both the third season of the Swiss reality singing competition The Voice of Switzerland and one episode of German music game I Can See Your Voice. Forrer's song for the contest was revealed on 7 March 2023.

=== At Eurovision ===
According to Eurovision rules, all nations with the exceptions of the host country and the "Big Five" (France, Germany, Italy, Spain and the United Kingdom) are required to qualify from one of two semi-finals in order to compete in the final; the top ten countries from each semi-final progress to the final. The European Broadcasting Union (EBU) split up the competing countries into five different "pots" based on voting patterns from previous contests, with countries with favourable voting histories put into the same pot. On 31 January 2023, an allocation draw was held to place each country into one of the two semi-finals, and determine which half of the semi-final show they would perform in. Switzerland was placed into the first semi-final and scheduled to perform in the second half of the show. At the end of the first semi-final, held on 9 May 2023, Switzerland qualified to the final, being the third nation to be announced as qualified and set to perform in the final on 13 May 2023. For the grand final, Switzerland was drawn to compete on the first half. Switzerland was subsequently placed to perform in position 3, following the entry from Portugal and before the entry from Poland.

== Charts ==
Chart performance for "Watergun"
| Chart (2023) | Peak position |
|---|---|
| Austria (Ö3 Austria Top 40) | 70 |
| Finland (Suomen virallinen lista) | 26 |
| Iceland (Tónlistinn) | 27 |
| Lithuania (AGATA) | 27 |
| Netherlands (Single Tip) | 17 |
| Sweden Heatseeker (Sverigetopplistan) | 1 |
| Switzerland (Schweizer Hitparade) | 2 |
| UK Singles Downloads (Official Charts) | 26 |

== Certifications ==
Certifications and sales for "Watergun"
| Region | Certification | Certified units/sales |
|---|---|---|
| Switzerland (IFPI Switzerland) | Platinum | 15,000^{‡} |
^{‡} Sales+streaming figures based on certification alone.

Awards and achievements
| Preceded by Marius Bear with "Boys Do Cry" | Switzerland in the Eurovision Song Contest; 2023 | Succeeded by Nemo with "The Code" |
