= Remo Forrer =

Swiss singer (born 2001)

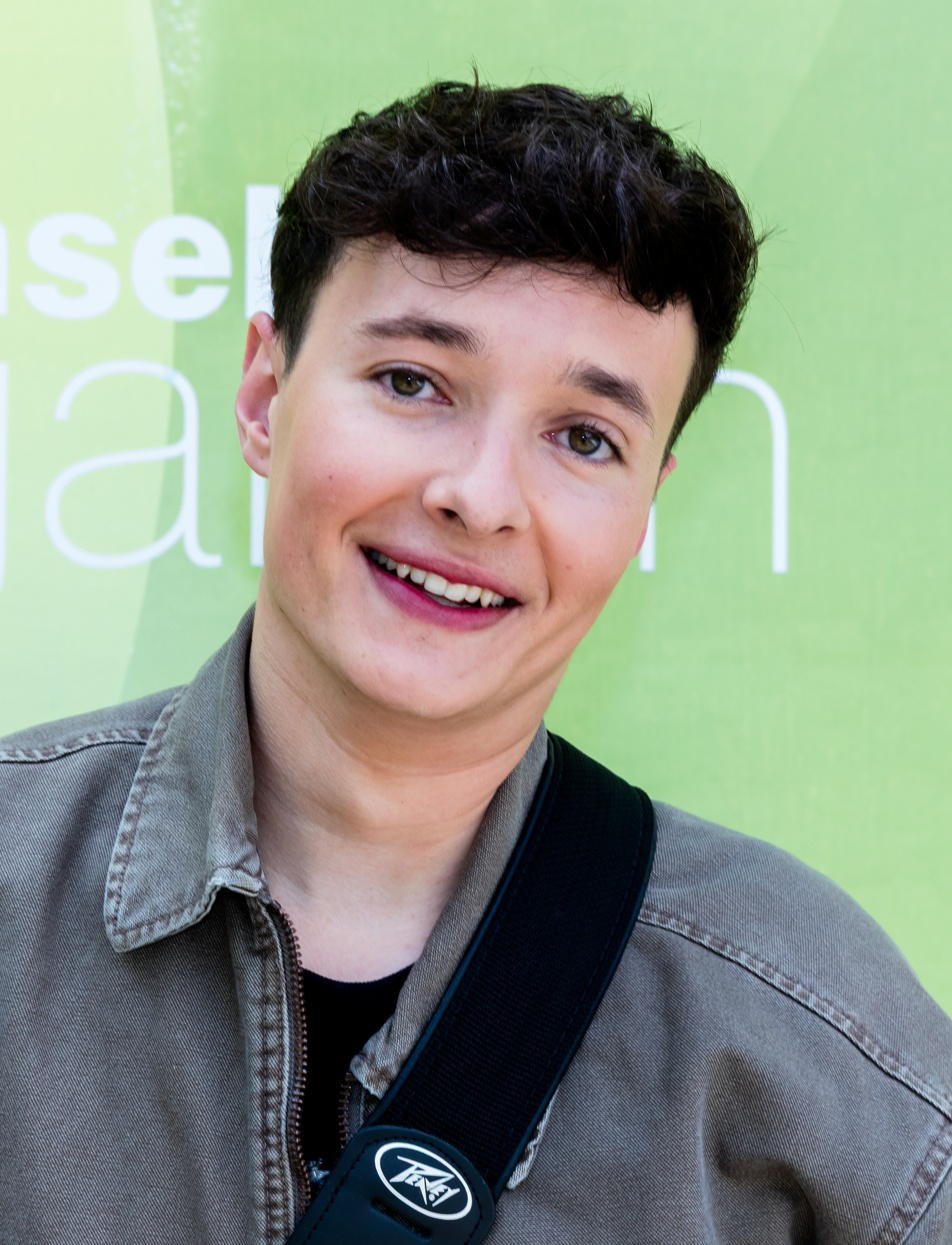
- Forrer in 2025

Background information
- Born: 8 September 2001 (age 25); Hemberg, St. Gallen, Switzerland
- Occupation: Singer
- Years active: 2020–present

Remo Forrer (born 8 September 2001) is a Swiss singer. He won the third season of the TV talent show The Voice of Switzerland in April 2020, and also participated in the German television talent show I Can See Your Voice. He represented Switzerland in the Eurovision Song Contest 2023 with the song "Watergun", which peaked at number two in his home country. He also appeared as "Orca" on The Masked Singer Switzerland.

== Career ==
=== 2019–2022: The Voice of Switzerland and I Can See Your Voice ===
In November 2019, Forrer auditioned for the third season of The Voice of Switzerland with the song "Someone You Loved" by Lewis Capaldi. He received chair turns from all four coaches and joined Noah Veraguth's team. Forrer won the season on 6 April 2020.

The Voice of Switzerland performances
Round	Song	Original artist(s)	Notes
Blind auditions	"Someone You Loved"	Lewis Capaldi	Four-chair turn, joined Team Noah
Battle	"Say You Won't Let Go"	James Arthur	Won against Desirée Rodenas Vazquez
Sing offs	"Someone You Loved"	Lewis Capaldi	
Final	"Sign of the Times"	Harry Styles	

=== 2023: Eurovision Song Contest ===
On 20 February 2023, Remo Forrer was announced as the Swiss representative for the Eurovision Song Contest 2023 by Swiss broadcaster SRG SSR. His competing song, "Watergun", was released on 7 March.

He performed in the first semi-final and qualified for the final, where he placed 20th with 92 points.

== Personal life ==
Forrer lives in Hemberg, in the canton of St. Gallen. He has had an interest in music since his early childhood, which led to him learning to play the flute, the accordion and eventually the piano, which he taught himself to play by ear. He completed an internship as a retail specialist in a sporting goods store.

== Discography ==
=== Extended plays ===
List of EPs, with selected details
Title	Details
Favorite Kind of Lonely	Released: 31 May 2024; Label: Manifester; Formats: Digital download, streaming
Smalltown Boy	Released: 28 February 2025; Label: Manifester; Formats: Digital download, streaming

=== Singles ===
==== As lead artist ====
List of singles, with selected chart positions
Title	Year	Peak chart positions				Album or EP
Title	Year	SWI	FIN	LTU	SWE Heat.	Album or EP
"Home"	2020	93	—	—	—	Non-album singles
"Let Go"	2021	—	—	—	—	Non-album singles
"Sweet Lies"	2021	—	—	—	—	Non-album singles
"Out Loud"	2022	—	—	—	—	Non-album singles
"Watergun"	2023	2	26	27	1	Favorite Kind of Lonely
"Not Okay"	2023	—	—	—	—	Favorite Kind of Lonely
"Long Year"	2023	—	—	—	—	Non-album single
"Heaven or Hell"	2024	—	—	—	—	Favorite Kind of Lonely
"Full 180"	2024	—	—	—	—	Favorite Kind of Lonely
"Down to My Bones"	2024	—	—	—	—	Smalltown Boy
"Underwater"	2025	—	—	—	—	Smalltown Boy
"Falling"	2026	— (Note: "Falling" did not reach the Singles Top 100, but peaked at number 17 at the Swiss airplay chart.)	—	—	—	Non-album singles
"Reverie"	2026	—	—	—	—	Non-album singles
"—" denotes a recording that did not chart or was not released in that territory.

==== As featured artist ====
Title	Year	Album or EP
"Summer Soul" (Peter Lenzin featuring Remo Forrer)	2022	Non-album single

== Notes ==
Awards and achievements
Preceded by Tiziana Gulino	The Voice of Switzerland winner 2020	Succeeded by TBD
Preceded by Marius Bear with "Boys Do Cry"	Switzerland in the Eurovision Song Contest; 2023	Succeeded by Nemo with "The Code"
