= Sedato season 3 =

Television game show season

Sedato
- Season 3
- Starring: Elika Abdolrazzaghi; Mohammad Alizadeh; Amir Mahdi Jule; Mohsen Sharifian
- Hosted by: Siamak Ansari
- Winners: Good singers: 7; Bad singers: 8
- No. of episodes: Regular: 10; Special: 5; Overall: 15

Release
- Original network: Filimo
- Original release: 3 March – 26 June 2025

Season chronology
- ← Previous; Season 2 Next → Season 4

The third season of the Iranian television mystery music game show Sedato premiered on Filimo on 3 March 2025.

== Gameplay ==
=== Format ===
According to the original South Korean rules, the contestant must attempt to eliminate bad singers during its game phase. At the final performance, the last remaining mystery singer is revealed as either good or bad by means of a duet between them and one of the guest artists. (Note: Gameplay note: Returning good singers from previous seasons are technically included as guest artists, assigning on duet performance duties.)

The contestant must eliminate one mystery singer at the end of each round, receiving IR60 million if they eliminate a bad singer. At the end of a game, if the contestant decides to walk away, they will keep the money had won in previous rounds; if they decide to risk for the last remaining mystery singer, they win IR400 million if a singer is good, or lose their all winnings if a singer is bad.

=== Rounds ===
1. Lip sync (Persian: لیپ سینک)
  Six mystery singers are divided into pairs, in which each compete a lip sync battle against each other.
2. Secret studio (Persian: استودیو مخفی)
  The contestant is presented with four people inside separate recording session podiums, but pitch-shifted to obscure their actual vocals.
3. Question and answer (Persian: سین جیم)
  The contestant may ask questions to the remaining mystery singers. Good singers are required to give truthful responses, while the bad singers must lie.

== Episodes ==
Legend:
Good singer
Bad singer
— The contestant chose to risk the money.
— The contestant chose to walk away with the money.

Episode		Guest artist (Note: Players' notes: For the returning guest artists (who also include foreigners and former good singers), names are displayed in italics.; For the mixed groups, names who identified as bad singers are displayed in italics.)	Contestant	Mystery singers (In their respective numbers and aliases)					
#	Date	Guest artist	Contestant	Elimination order					Winner
#	Date	Guest artist	Contestant	Lip sync			Secret studio	Question and answer	Winner
1	3 March 2025	Farnam Kamali	Seyed Sajjad Pajour → IR0	3. Amir Hossein Eshteri; (Musical Therapist)	6. Shervin Moulai; (Online Seller)	5. Moin Hajjinejad; (Souvenir Shop Vendor)	4. Omid Shiri; (Teacher)	1. Amir Yousefi; (MBA Graduate)	2. Arash Shirvani; Human Resource Associate
Special	10 March 2025	Ilya Gravand	Nazanin Hakimifar → IR400,000,000	6. Barsam Karimzadeh; (Future Bookworm)	2. Alireza Sahibpour; (Future Architect)	4. Ahoura Rahimi; (Future Storywriter)	3. Sadra Zafaripour; (Future Painter)	5. Ali Heraini; (Future Chef)	1. Alireza Ghorbanpour; Future Reader
Special	17 March 2025	Hadi Azizi	Jalal Tehrani → IR0	6. Seyed Imad Shirvani; (Think-tank Mentor)	5. Ilya Sadeghian; (Movement Mentor)	4. Omid Sahdati; (Musical Mentor)	1. Mohammad Mehran Tajik; (Facial Expression Mentor)	3. Farhad Baghaei; (Hardworking Mentor)	2. Kian Kazemi Aghdami; Emotional Mentor
Special	31 March 2025	Mohammad Guderzifar	Mir-Taher Mazloomi → IR400,000,000	6. Ali Manouchehr; (Usher)	3. Ali Yadegari; (Bridal Auntie)	2. Seyed Reza Miriah; (Man of Honour)	5. Hamid Reza Karimi; (Groomsman)	4. Amir Mohammad Ansafi; (Bridegroom)	1. Mustafa Aravian; Bridesman
2	7 April 2025	Ali Eyazkhani	Hamed Hadian → IR400,000,000	3. Mehrdad Moghadam; (Turkish Folk Musician)	1. Alireza Rashidi; (Luri Folk Musician)	5. Meysam Khazaei; (Kurdish Folk Musician)	6. Mojtaba Zarei; (Balochi Folk Musician)	4. Mohammad Malek Hosseini; (Mazandarani Folk Musician)	2. Mostafa Rahnavard; Khorasani Folk Musician
3	14 April 2025	Amir Mohammed Kamirpour	Akhil Royinbagh → IR0	1. Asghan Tajik; (Clothing Dealer)	2. Hussein Islami; (Auto Parts Dealer)	4. Mehdi Norouzi; (Billiards Player)	5. Saeed Hamrangan; (Trader)	3. Seyed Mehdi Jafarzadeh; (Stationery Owner)	6. Amir Fadajan; Food Connoisseur
Special	21 April 2025	Sinai Rasouli (Note: Season highlights: The 4th special episode of that season, dubbed as Paradox, displays reversed color designations on good or bad singers, meaning for "good is bad" or "bad is good".; In the Persian Made special, (panelist) Amir Mahdi Jule's daughter Gandam made her guesting appearance.)	Liana Sharifian → IR0	3. Ashkan Zargard	1. Benjamin Zafar	5. Amir Hossein Golestani	4. Mohammad Reza Habibian	2. Hossein Bahrami	6. Mohammad Amin Ebrahimi
4	1 May 2025	Mohsen Kerami	Mohammad Mehdi Ashayeri → IR400,000,000	6. Milad Nouri; (Electrical Engineer)	4. Rouzbeh Jafari; (Hardware Store Salesman)	2. Milad Farzadagh; (General Affairs Officer)	1. Hekmat Ramezani; (Radio DJ)	5. Ali Nehmati; (Dizi Sara Owner)	3. Ali Rezaei; Petrol Station Attendant
5	1 May 2025	Abulfazl Kalagher	Yaseman Rahmani → IR0	5. Iman Daeiba; (Merchandiser)	4. Saeed Sharifzadeh; (Mobile Technician)	1. Abbas Dekami; (Clothing Boutique Owner)	3. Mehdi Adelifar; (Santoor Teacher)	2. Soroush Tayibi; (Barista)	6. Ayoub Panahi; Voice Coach
6	12 May 2025	Pajhwok Pakzad	Mehdi Soleimani → IR0	6. Mohammad Qassim Rashidi Golorieh; (Veterinarian)	3. Hojjat Kia; (Masseur)	2. Toraj Farshi; (Gardener)	5. Nima Sobhani; (Mechanical Engineer)	4. Amir Hossein Nourani; (Doctor)	1. Hussein Pazandi; Runway Model
7	19 May 2025	Nasser Mousavi	Sherin Kalaghti → IR400,000,000	1. Amir Hossein Farsi; (Security System Designer)	2. Amir Hossein Shahri; (Footballer)	4. Massoud Fadai; (Beekeeper)	3. Amir Ali Najibzadeh; (Interpreter)	6. Yazdan Karami; (Forklift Mechanic)	5. Arman Bahirai; Researcher
8	26 May 2025	Matin Davoudi	Leyla Bemniri → IR0	2. Armin Mahdavi; (Music Teacher)	4. Ehsan Amini; (Dubbing Manager)	1. Amir Mehdi Nazar; (Psychology Student)	5. Ali Pirparani; (Battery Technician)	3. Milad Formouz; (Brand Consultant)	6. Hadi Ghorbani; Futsal Player
9	2 June 2025	Amir Mehdi Ghasemi	Mohsen Eshaghabadi → IR400,000,000	6. Shahriar Seif al-Dini; (Tea House Student)	5. Aria Sadri; (Florist)	3. Kianoush Asadzadeh; (Technical Staff Member)	4. Hamid Tajik; (IT Specialist)	2. Danial Deldari; (Sa'dabad Palace Teacher)	1. Mehdi Gharegozlou; Sorbet Vendor
10	9 June 2025	Reza Aghajan	Kiana Rabonik → IR400,000,000	1. Mohammad Tahani; (Calligrapher)	5. Arash Mandaripour; (Musical Theatre Student)	4. Hossein Fallah; (Puppeteer)	6. Mohammad Hossein Ferouz; (Mining Equipment Vendor)	2. Mohammad Amin Shirkhanlou; (Production Manager)	3. Arman Lashkari; Medical Intern
Special	26 June 2025	Hossein Ghahari	Ali Osivand → IR400,000,000	2. Pejman Nikdani	3. Naeim Roshan	1. Hossein Gholehdar	5. Amir Hossein Norouzi	4. Reza Bahari	6. Farshad Payrvand
