= I Can See Your Voice (German game show) season 2 =

Television game show season

I Can See Your Voice
- Season 2
- Starring: Thomas Hermanns; Tim Mälzer
- Hosted by: Daniel Hartwich
- Winners: Good singers: 2; Bad singers: 4
- No. of episodes: 6

Release
- Original network: RTL
- Original release: 30 March – 4 May 2021

Season chronology
- ← Previous; Season 1 Next → Season 3 (as Zeig uns Deine Stimme!)

The second season of the German television mystery music game show I Can See Your Voice premiered on RTL on 30 March 2021.

At the time of filming during the COVID-19 pandemic, health and safety protocols are also implemented.

== Gameplay ==
=== Format ===
According to the original South Korean rules, the guest artist(s) and contestant must attempt to eliminate bad singers during its game phase. At the final performance, the last remaining mystery singer is revealed as either good or bad by means of a duet between them and one of the guest artists.

If the last remaining mystery singer is good, the contestant wins €10,000; this is also applied to the winning bad singer selected by them.

=== Rounds ===
1. First impression (German: Erster Eindruck)
  The guest artist and contestant are given some time to observe and examine each mystery singer based on their appearance.
2. Lip sync (German: Das Playback)
  Each mystery singer performs a lip sync to a song; good singers mime to a recording of their own, while bad singers mime to a backing track by another vocalist.
3. Fact or fake? (German: Fakt oder Fake?)
  The guest artist and contestant are presented with a video package containing possible clues by one of the mystery singers.
4. Secret studio (German: Soundcheck)
  The guest artist and contestant are presented with video from a recording session by one of the mystery singers, but pitch-shifted to obscure their actual vocals.
5. Cross-examination (German: Kreuzverhör)
  The guest artist and contestant may ask questions to the remaining mystery singers. Good singers are required to give truthful responses, while the bad singers must lie.

== Episodes ==
=== Guest artists ===
Legend:
Good singer
Bad singer
— The contestants won the money.
— The winning bad singer stole the money.

Episode		Guest artist (Note: Players' notes: For the returning guest artists (who also include foreigners and former good singers), names are displayed in italics.; For the mixed groups, names who identified as bad singers are displayed in italics.)	Contestant	Mystery singers (In their respective numbers and aliases)						
#	Date	Guest artist	Contestant	Elimination order						Winner
#	Date	Guest artist	Contestant	First impression	Lip sync		Fact or fake?	Secret studio	Cross-examination	Winner
1	30 March 2021	The BossHoss	Marleen → €0	2. Alessandro Pola; (Country Singer)	4. Sinikka Monte; (Fitness Model)	6. Dino Ganić; (Radio Host)	7. Kimberly Kalimba; (Mechatronic)	5. Denis Henning; (Jester)	1. Nadine Bittl; (Anime Fan)	3. Solanny Kiko; Nurse
2	6 April 2021	Barbara Schöneberger	Niels → €10,000	6. Luciene Schwab; (Samba Dancer)	1. Anna Chumanskaya; (Interpreter)	5. Lusine Khachatryan; (Concert Pianist)	3. Sarah Alawuru; (Politician)	7. Stefan Paßerschroer; (Rabbit Breader)	2. Lars Lich; (American Football Player)	4. Julian Fiege; Jeans Seller
3	13 April 2021	Maite Kelly	Krissy → €0	1. Jenny Kim Thiem; (Contortionist)	2. Mika Setzer; (Footballer)	5. Walter Golczyk; (Forest Lifeguard)	4. Theresa Brückner; (Gospel Singer)	7. Lynn Limbertz; (Skater Girl)	3. Ingmar Björn Nolting; (Photographer)	6. Annika Strauss; Horror Film Queen
4	20 April 2021	Hartmut Engler (Pur)	Katja → €0	2. Jessica Noll; (Perfume Saleswoman)	1. Berhane Berhane; (Stand-up Comedian)	5. Tara Bosshard; (Receptionist)	3. Kevin Derbas; (Make-up Artist)	7. Susanne Kiewning; (Wedding Planner)	6. Alexander Schmied; (Blacksmith)	4. Simone Ravera; Amateur Astronaut
5	27 April 2021	Jeanette Biedermann	Jenny → €0	5. Linda Erfolg; (Club DJ)	2. Diego Daniele; (Mechatronic)	7. Naemi Haas; (Candy Girl)	6. Elijah Knight; (Ice Hockey Goaltender)	1. Annika Hoenig; (Theatre Director)	3. Alexandra-Yoana Alexandrova; (Ballerina)	4. Alan Mathison; Supermarket Cashier
6	4 May 2021	Max Mutzke	Mandy → €10,000	5. Anna Roura-Maldonado; (Queen of Burlesque)	3. Giuseppe Rinaldo; (Hairdresser)	6. Tamara Verma; (Fire Dancer)	1. Hanspeter Zeifel; (Engineer)	2. Julia Heiser; (Fairytale Princess)	7. Carolin Drzisga; (Hostess)	4. Mary Vogel; Rockabilly Girl

=== Panelists ===
Legend:
Regular panelist
Guest panelist

Apps		Panelists in attendance (Sorted by first appearance, with episode designations)
g#	p#	Panelists in attendance (Sorted by first appearance, with episode designations)
6	1	Thomas Hermanns (1–6)
5	1	Tim Mälzer (2–6)
2	4	Jorge González (2, 5); Ross Antony (2, 6); Sophia Thomalla (3–4); Sabrina Mockenhaupt (5–6)
1	11	Ilka Bessin, Motsi Mabuse, Oliver Pocher, and Victoria Swarovski (1); Caroline Frier (2); Sasha and Jürgen von der Lippe (3); Oliver Geissen and Michael Kessler (4); Lili Paul-Roncalli (5); Joachim Llambi (6)

== Reception ==
Legend:
Highest rated episode
Lowest rated episode

No.	Title	Air date	Timeslot (CET)	Share			Viewership			Ref(s)
No.	Title	Air date	Timeslot (CET)	Grp. 18–49	Cons.	Comb.	Grp. 18–49	Cons.	Total	Ref(s)
1	"The BossHoss"	30 March 2021	Tuesday, 20:15	14.3%	7.6%	11%	1.11	1.19	2.3	
2	"Barbara Schöneberger"	6 April 2021	Tuesday, 20:15	11%	6.4%	8.8%	0.96	1.07	2.03	
3	"Maite Kelly"	13 April 2021	Tuesday, 20:15	11.4%	6.5%	9%	0.98	1.06	2.04	
4	"Hartmut Engler"	20 April 2021	Tuesday, 20:15	7.4%	5%	6.2%	0.64	0.87	1.51	
5	"Jeanette Biedermann"	27 April 2021	Tuesday, 20:15	10.2%	6%	8.1%	0.83	1.01	1.84	
6	"Max Mutzke"	4 May 2021	Tuesday, 20:15	10.9%	6.3%	8.6%	0.83	1.07	1.9	

Source: AGF Videoforschung
