= Für Dich =

Für Dich or Für dich may refer to:

- Für Dich, a 1973 album by Peggy March
- Für Dich, a 2014 album by Andreas Martin
- Für Dich (Vanessa Mai album), 2016
- Für dich. (Xavier Naidoo album), 2017
- "Für dich" (song), a 2003 single by Yvonne Catterfeld
