= I Can See Your Voice (German game show) season 1 =

Television game show season

I Can See Your Voice
- Season 1
- Starring: Evelyn Burdecki; Jorge González; Thomas Hermanns; Tim Mälzer; Judith Rakers
- Hosted by: Daniel Hartwich
- Winners: Good singers: 2; Bad singers: 0
- No. of episodes: 2

Release
- Original network: RTL
- Original release: 18 August – 19 August 2020

Season chronology
- Next → Season 2

The first season of the German television mystery music game show I Can See Your Voice premiered on RTL with two-night pilot episodes on 18 and 19 August 2020.

As filming for this season taking place at MMC Studios in Ehrenfeld, Cologne, viewers have been complained on filmings for not implementing health and safety protocols amidst the COVID-19 pandemic that resulted in immediate halting of its production, prematurely ending the season; Tresor Television spokesperson Jovan Evermann did even clarify that the federal health department guidelines have been followed properly. This incident also had a similar fate to second season of the Philippine counterpart.

== Gameplay ==
=== Format ===
According to the original South Korean rules, the guest artist and contestant must attempt to eliminate bad singers during its game phase. At the final performance, the last remaining mystery singer is revealed as either good or bad by means of a duet between them and one of the guest artists.

If the last remaining mystery singer is good, the contestant wins €10,000; this is also applied to the winning bad singer selected by them.

=== Rounds ===
1. First impression (German: Erster Eindruck)
  The guest artist and contestant are given some time to observe and examine each mystery singer based on their appearance.
2. Lip sync (German: Das Playback)
  Each mystery singer performs a lip sync to a song; good singers mime to a recording of their own, while bad singers mime to a backing track by another vocalist.
3. Fact or fake? (German: Fakt oder Fake?)
  The guest artist and contestant are presented with a video package containing possible clues by one of the mystery singers.
4. Cross-examination (German: Kreuzverhör)
  The guest artist and contestant may ask questions to the remaining mystery singers. Good singers are required to give truthful responses, while the bad singers must lie.

== Episodes ==
Legend:
Good singer
Bad singer
— The contestants won the money.
— The winning bad singer stole the money.

Episode		Guest artist (Note: Players' notes: For the returning guest artists (who also include foreigners and former good singers), names are displayed in italics.; For the mixed groups, names who identified as bad singers are displayed in italics.)	Contestant	Mystery singers (In their respective numbers and aliases)						
#	Date	Guest artist	Contestant	Elimination order						Winner
#	Date	Guest artist	Contestant	First impression	Lip sync		Fact or fake?		Cross-examination	Winner
1	18 August 2020	Sasha	Nicole → €10,000	7. Daniel Oldemeier; (Air Guitar Rocker)	3. Aubrey Martell; (Soul Sister)	6. Jannis Romeikat; (Solo Entertainer)	1. Lois Zarculea; (Bodybuilder)	5. Pam Pengco; (Drag Queen)	2. Marius Bear; (Swiss Town Musician)	4. Sebastian Winkler; Bone Breaker
2	19 August 2020	Vanessa Mai	Picco → €10,000	3. Sabrina Torkel; (Schlager Fan)	1. Saskia Nike Schultheis; (Opera Student)	7. Mona Schafnitzl; (Miss Upper Bavaria)	4. Nicolas Dinkel; (Hard Rocker)	5. Gisele Abramoff; (Amazon Queen)	2. Jayden Yard; (Stripper)	6. Julia Schneider; Gamer

== Reception ==
Legend:
Highest rated episode
Lowest rated episode

No.	Title	Air date	Timeslot (CET)	Share			Viewership			Ref(s)
No.	Title	Air date	Timeslot (CET)	Grp. 18–49	Cons.	Comb.	Grp. 18–49	Cons.	Total	Ref(s)
1	"Sasha"	18 August 2020	Tuesday, 20:15	13.1%	11.1%	12.1%	0.98	1.16	2.14	
2	"Vanessa Mai"	19 August 2020	Wednesday, 20:15	11.1%	7.1%	9.1%	0.79	1.06	1.85	

Source: AGF Videoforschung
