= Sedato season 2 =

Television game show season

Sedato
- Season 2
- Starring: Mohammad Bahrani; Amir Mahdi Jule; Shabnam Moghaddami; Mohsen Sharifian
- Hosted by: Mohsen Kiaei
- Winners: Good singers: 9; Bad singers: 6
- No. of episodes: Regular: 11; Special: 4; Overall: 15

Release
- Original network: Filimo
- Original release: 21 March – 4 July 2024

Season chronology
- ← Previous; Season 1 Next → Season 3

The second season of the Iranian television mystery music game show Sedato premiered on Filimo on 21 March 2024.

== Gameplay ==
=== Format ===
According to the original South Korean rules, the contestant must attempt to eliminate bad singers during its game phase. At the final performance, the last remaining mystery singer is revealed as either good or bad by means of a duet between them and one of the guest artists. (Note: Gameplay note: Returning good singers from previous seasons are technically included as guest artists, assigning on duet performance duties.)

The contestant must eliminate one mystery singer at the end of each round, receiving IR40 million if they eliminate a bad singer. At the end of a game, if the contestant decides to walk away, they will keep the money had won in previous rounds; if they decide to risk for the last remaining mystery singer, they win IR300 million if a singer is good, or lose their all winnings if a singer is bad.

=== Rounds ===
1. Lip sync (Persian: لیپ سینک)
  Six mystery singers are divided into pairs, in which each compete a lip sync battle against each other.
2. Secret studio (Persian: استودیو مخفی)
  The contestant is presented with four people inside separate recording session podiums, but pitch-shifted to obscure their actual vocals.
3. Question and answer (Persian: سین جیم)
  The contestant may ask questions to the remaining mystery singers. Good singers are required to give truthful responses, while the bad singers must lie.

== Episodes ==
Legend:
Good singer
Bad singer
— The contestant chose to risk the money.
— The contestant chose to walk away with the money.

Episode		Guest artist (Note: Players' notes: For the returning guest artists (who also include foreigners and former good singers), names are displayed in italics.; For the mixed groups, names who identified as bad singers are displayed in italics.)	Contestant	Mystery singers (In their respective numbers and aliases)					
#	Date	Guest artist	Contestant	Elimination order					Winner
#	Date	Guest artist	Contestant	Lip sync			Secret studio	Question and answer	Winner
1	21 March 2024	Mohammad Haghighi	Gharibe Hassanpour → IR0	2. Amir Mehdi Ghasemi; (Volleyball Player)	1. Morteza Bakhtavar; (Shopkeeper)	5. Syed Reza Taykh; (Desert Rider)	4. Pajhwok Pakzad; (Comedian)	6. Milad Bayandrian; (Ecotourist)	3. Sayyed Amir Alam Baladi; Barista
2	28 March 2024	Ali Eyazkhani	Maria Sakhi → IR0	4. Matin Davoudi; (Santoor Player)	2. Pouria Tajkri; (Immigration Consultant)	3. Amin Ganch Khanlu; (Arabic Language Teacher)	5. Kivan Zarei; (Rally Driver)	6. Tawhid Hedayatifar; (Insurance Agent)	1. Mehdi Ashgari; Linguist
3	4 April 2024	Mahdi Faramarz	Sohail Ghasemi → IR300,000,000	1. Arman Marathi; (Music Arranger)	2. Arian Nazarek; (Busker)	3. Mohammed Qolizadeh; (Soloist)	5. Yashar Bayrami; (Musical Conservatory Student)	6. Mehdi Sharekh; (Vocal Coach)	4. Mohdali Hashemi Dehkordi; Songwriter
Special	11 April 2024	Ali Eyazkhani	Javad Hashemi → IR300,000,000	1. Nasser Mousavi; (Gurban Ali)	2. Ahura Gol Umopour; (Samad)	4. Ilya Madras; (Doshangh)	5. Mahmoud Mehboobi; (Siavash)	6. Alireza Afshar; (Jalal)	3. Abulfazl Kalagher; Zolfali
4	18 April 2024	Ali Behrati	Mohammad Mandadi → IR300,000,000	3. Mohammad Amin Sabze Ali; (Beatboxer)	2. Hojat Khorasani; (Dubbing Student)	4. Aziz Mohsen; (Musician)	6. Mohammad Guderzifar; (Showman)	5. Seyed Amirreza Mobini; (Geneticist)	1. Mustafa Panjapour; Rice Farmer
5	25 April 2024	Amin Shokohi	Mahin Banawabonsari → IR0	1. Mehdi Ranjbar; (Supermarket Staff)	2. Moin Ghobadi; (Tennis Player)	4. Amir Izadfanah; (Gadget Vendor)	5. Hadi Azizi; (Clothing Seller)	6. Sinai Rasouli; (Basketball Player)	3. Mohammad Baqer Hosni; Luthier
6	2 May 2024	Mohammad Tawakli	Ramissa Hashemi → IR300,000,000	4. Ehsan Bagheri; (Economist)	6. Hadi Abedinejad Nain; (Food Delivery Rider)	1. Said Fallah; (Hospital Staff)	5. Mohammad Hussein Gholami; (Electrical Engineering Student)	2. Seyyed Amir Hossein Mirkarimi; (Content Creator)	3. Maijd Bayat; Refinery Expert
Special	9 May 2024	Sadegh Nikokalam (Note: Season highlight: Football player and coach Ali Parvin and (host) Mohsen Kiaei's daughter Roza made their guesting appearances.)	Saman Ehteshami → IR0	1. Alireza and Mohammad Reza Ahmadi Rad	6. Mehdi and Hadi Ahmadi	5. Muhammad and Ali Arabi	2. Morteza and Mustafa Seyed Nejad	3. Hamid and Majid Navide	4. Mehdi and Mohsen Soleimani
7	16 May 2024	Amir Reza Pahlavan	Asal Rezaei → IR300,000,000	5. Artam Sheikh Sajadi; (Kindergarten Teacher)	4. Ali Baqeri Saadat; (Online Seller)	1. Mohammad Javad Boland; (Freight Agent)	2. Alireza Araz; (Music Student Dropout)	3. Perham Ahmadi; (Veterinary Student)	6. Mohammad Javad Fekri; Lantern Maker
8	30 May 2024	Mashid Najibzadeh	Pouria Mortazavi → IR300,000,000	2. Mohammed Momin Sohri; (Jeweller)	3. Farzad Sabouri; (Film Directing Student)	4. Massoud Yousefi; (School Deputy)	6. Omid Jafari; (Electrician)	5. Danial Mohammadi; (Digital Market Consultant)	1. Farnam Kamali; Engineering Employee
9	6 June 2024	Misham Karimi	Hormuz Kehsani → IR300,000,000	5. Reza Shaukti; (Online Storekeeper)	3. Fardad Ansari; (Jurist)	1. Alireza Hail Moghaddam; (Radio DJ)	4. Armin Yadullahi; (Film Director)	6. Seyed Mahmoud Waqfi; (Keyboardist)	2. Amir Mohammed Kamirpour; Swimmer
10	13 June 2024	Taha Mamorzadeh	Asmah Shemazdeh → IR0	4. Ahmad Reza Khosrovan; (Tehsildar)	6. Shayan Sakhai; (Busker)	5. Said Farajullah; (Hair Stylist)	1. Alireza Rostami; (Cyclist)	3. Reza Aghajan; (Shoemaker)	2. Mehdi Mehdizadeh; Audio Engineer
Special	20 June 2024	Hassan Zafar	Kianoush Gerami → IR300,000,000	3. Homan Hedaei	2. Hossein Ghahari	6. Amir Hossein Ghasemi	4. Shayan Tarkha	5. Massoud Jahangard Gilanipour	1. Hussain Tannah
Special	27 June 2024	Reza Khatamian	Mohammad Ghadimi → IR0	2. Shayan Bahrami	6. Hamidreza Hosni	5. Ilya Gravand	4. Mohammad Zare Moghaddam	1. Ali Asghar Esmaili	3. Reham Afsharpour
11	4 July 2024	Hossein Jafari	Nahid Hamzah → IR300,000,000	2. Amirreza Goderzi; (Vocalist)	5. Amirhossein Zafar; (Composer)	1. Ali Moradi; (Bodybuilder)	4. Iman Zarrin Sehrei; (Choralist)	6. Milad Saqabashi; (Bodyguard)	3. Mohsen Kerami; Teacher
