= Vanessa Mai =

German singer

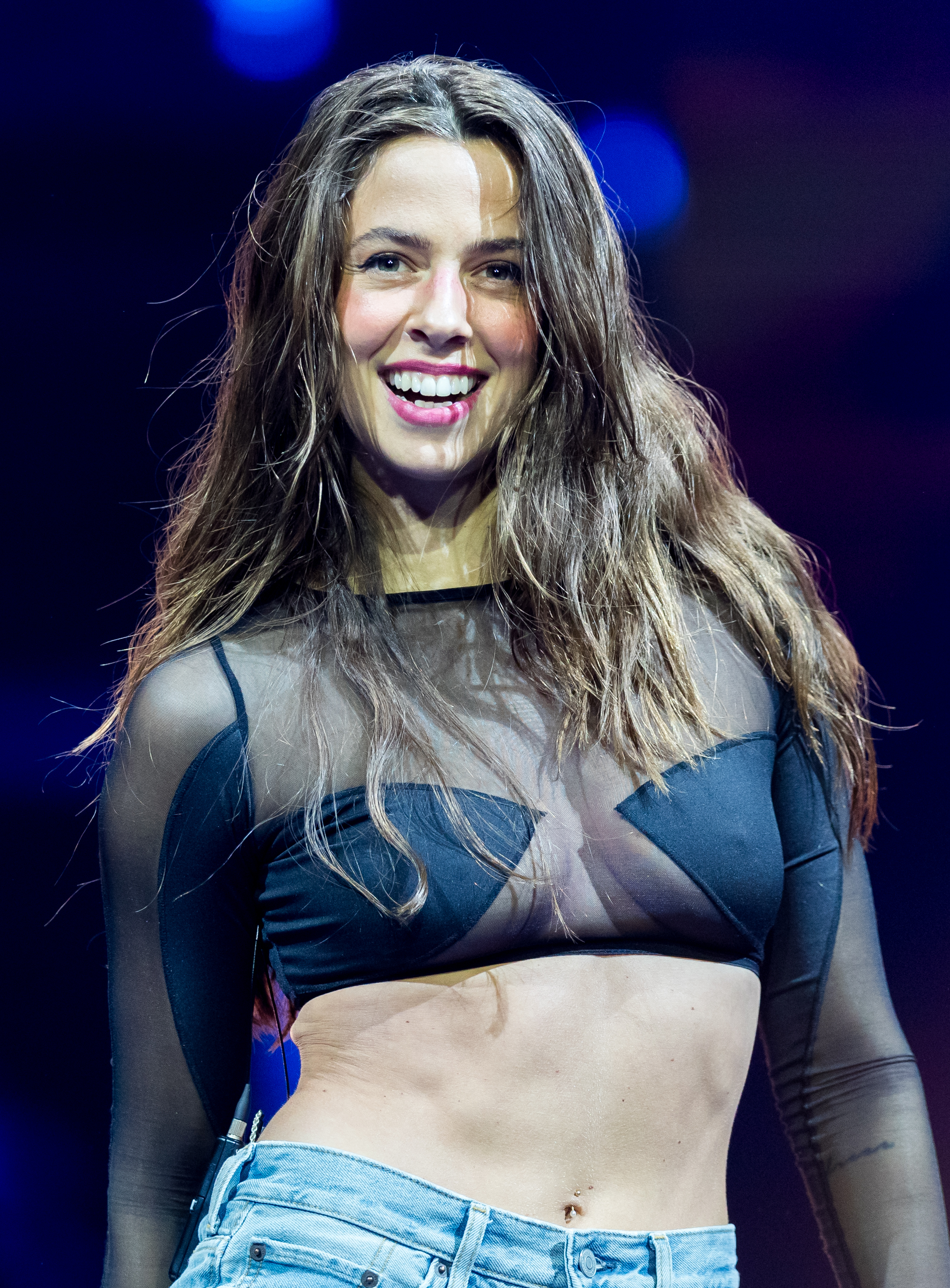
- Mai in 2024

Background information
- Born: Vanessa Mandekić; 2 May 1992 (age 34); Backnang, Germany
- Genres: Pop; Schlager; Europop
- Occupation: Singer
- Years active: 2012-present

Vanessa Marija Else Ferber (née Mandekić, born 2 May 1992), known professionally as Vanessa Mai, is a German singer. She was first-known as a member of Schlager band Wolkenfrei and later began working as a solo artist following the band's split. She chose her stage name as a reference to her birth month, which is spelled Mai (pronounced [maɪ]) in German.

== Early life ==
Mai completed a media designer apprenticeship. She had one of her first performances as a singer in the school-musical The wonderful Wizard of Oz. Before that, she had occasionally accompanied her father, a Croatian-born musician, with the tambourine. In 2008, aged 15, she took part in the hip-hop world championship in Las Vegas, placing last, as part of the dance-formation Getting craz'd, who were German champions.

== Career ==
=== 2012-2015: Wolkenfrei ===
In the summer of 2012, the then-singer of Wolkenfrei, Heike Wanner, left the band for health reasons. While attending a concert of her father's band Musik-Express at the Sonnenhof in Aspach, Mai was enlisted as a singer by Wolkenfrei member Marc Fischer. On 19 July 2013, their début single "Jeans, T-Shirts, und Freiheit" ("Jeans, T-Shirts, and Freedom") was released. It was followed by their début studio album Endlos verliebt ("Endlessly in Love") in February 2014, which charted in Germany, Austria, and Switzerland. In January 2015, it was announced that Mai was the new face of the campaign Mein Herz schlägt Schlager. She promoted it through an ad as well as with the song "Mein Herz schlägt Schlager", which was released on a sampler album belonging to the project.

In April 2015, Marc Fischer and Stefan Kinski announced that they were leaving Wolkenfrei, leading to the project being represented only by Mai (mostly as "Wolkenfrei-Star Vanessa Mai"). "Wolke 7", the first single from Wolkenfrei's second studio album, was released on 22 May. The album, titled Wachgeküsst, was released on 10 July. A day before, Deutsches Musik Fernsehen had dedicated a 65-minute television special to Mai and to the album. Due to Mai's extensive television presence, including an appearance on Florian Silbereisen's ARD show Die Besten im Sommer with the song "Wolke 7", the album reached place 7 of the German albums chart and also charted in Austria and Switzerland. The single "Wolke 7" reached place 54 in Germany and 71 in Austria. On 18 September, "Wachgeküsst", the album's title track, was released as its second single. On 9 October, Mai's first live album (still as Wolkenfrei), Wachgeküsst (Live), was released. The last single "In all deinen Farben" ("In all your Colors") was released on December 11, followed a week later by a non-album Christmas single titled "Ein Engel in der Weihnachtszeit" ("An Angel in Christmas Time").

=== 2016-present: Abandonment of the Wolkenfrei name and solo career ===
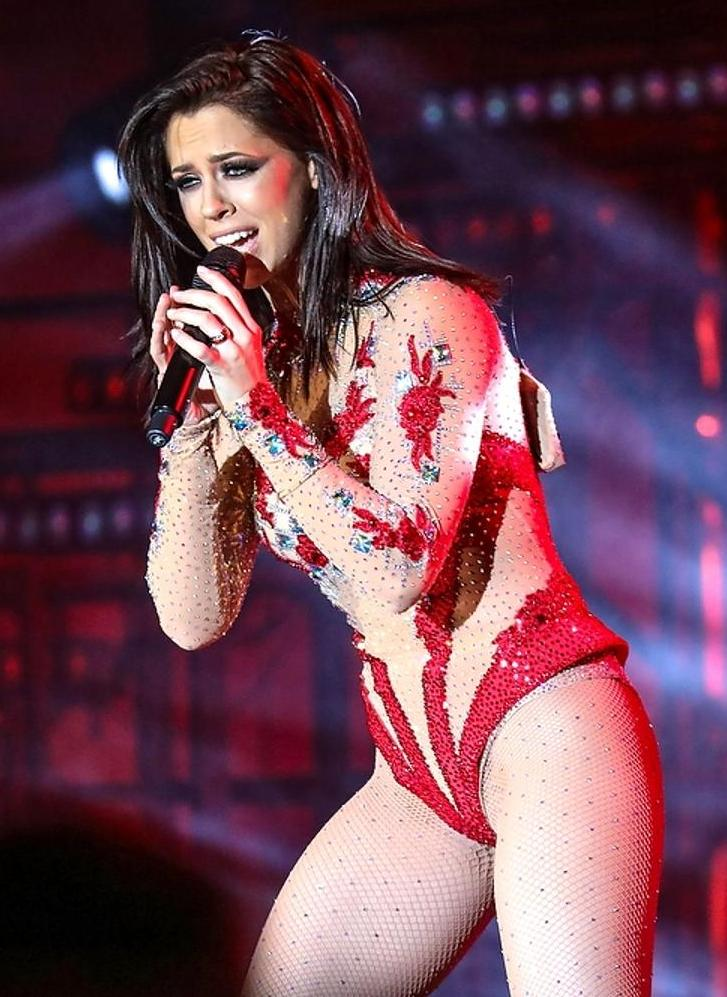
Mai performing in 2018

From January to May 2016, Mai was a judge on the thirteenth season of Deutschland sucht den Superstar, the German version of Pop Idol and American Idol. In February, she announced her decision to not perform under the name of Wolkenfrei anymore. Her first single under the name Vanessa Mai, titled "Ich sterb für dich" ("I Die For You"), was released on 19 February. It preceded her first studio album under the name Vanessa Mai and third studio album overall, Für Dich ("For You"), which was released on 15 April. The single as well as the album were produced by her Deutschland sucht den Superstar colleague Dieter Bohlen. From September to November, Mai went on her first solo tour, which visited Germany, Denmark, and Switzerland for 26 dates. A live album titled Für Dich - Live aus Berlin, recorded at the Tempodrom in Berlin, was released on 6 January 2017. From March to May, she took part in the tenth season of Let's Dance, the German version of Strictly Come Dancing, and placed second. On 3 April 2017, Mai announced her second solo studio album and fourth overall with the single "Und wenn ich träum" (And when I dream").

On 18 July 2017, she released a special acoustic version of her first studio album, titled Für Dich - Akustik Best of, available only as a download through Tchibo's homepage as well as in all their shops in Germany. On 4 August 2017, she released the second single from her then-upcoming second solo album, "Nie wieder" ("Never again"). The album was released a week later under the title Regenbogen ("Rainbow"), which, like its predecessor, was produced by Bohlen. In November 2017, Mai and Bohlen announced the end of their professional relationship and she started working on her third studio album in her solo career, Schlager. In July 2018, Mai released her first single "WIR 2 IMMER 1 (feat. Olexesh)" of this album which became the most successful pop song of her by now. The album "Schlager" was released on 3 August 2018 and topped the German Charts. Thus she is the youngest Schlager music act of all time who topped the German Charts twice in a row. In 20 August 2020, Mai, together with Essen-based DJ Picco, took part in the second episode in the German version of I Can See Your Voice as a guest artist.

== Personal life ==
In 2012, Mai met Andrea Berg's stepson Andreas Ferber, who became her manager, in a Stuttgart club, and began dating him in 2013. After getting engaged in early 2016, they got married in June 2017. The civil marriage took place on 6 June, while the church wedding took place on Mallorca on June 12.

== Discography ==
=== As Wolkenfrei ===
- Endlos verliebt (2014)
- Wachgeküsst (2015)
- Hotel Tropicana (2023)

=== As Vanessa Mai ===
==== Albums ====
- Für Dich (2016)
- Regenbogen (2017)
- Schlager (2018)
- Für immer (2020)
- Mai Tai (2021)
- Metamorphose (2022)
- Matrix (2024)
- Traumfabrik (2025)

==== Singles ====
- Himbeerrot (One Kiss) (2024)
- Lobby (2024)
- Schneemann (2024)
- Von London nach New York (2025)
- Sorry Sorry (2025)
- 100% verliebt (2025)
- Für mich bist du Liebe (2025)
- Küss mich wach (2025)

== Tours ==
- Zuhause bei Dir Tour (2024)

== Television specials ==
- 2015 - Wolkenfrei Wolke 7 - Das TV-Spezial (Broadcaster: Deutsches Musik Fernsehen. Length: 65 minutes. Moderator: Ingo Blenn)
- 2016 - Vanessa Mai - Mein Herz schlägt Schlager (Broadcaster: Mitteldeutscher Rundfunk. Length: 45 minutes)

== Awards ==
- 2016 - ECHO in the category Schlager for Wachgeküsst (still as Wolkenfrei)
- 2017 - Die Eins der Besten in the category Shooting-Star des Jahres
