= Marius Bear =

Swiss singer (born 1993)

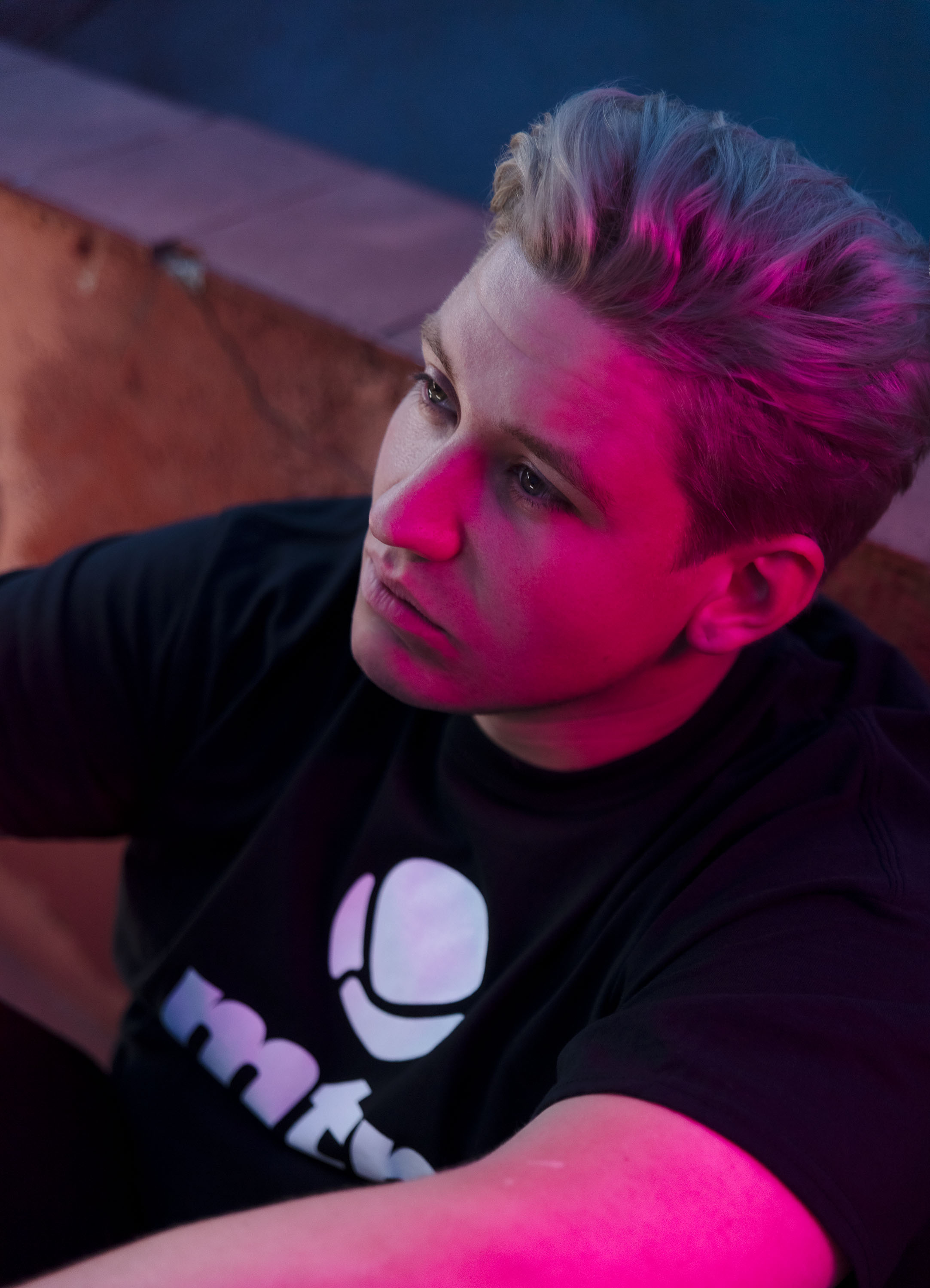
- Marius Bear in 2020

Background information
- Born: Marius Hügli; 21 April 1993 (age 32); Schlatt-Haslen, Appenzell Innerrhoden, Switzerland
- Occupations: Singer; songwriter
- Years active: 2016–present

Marius Hügli (born 21 April 1993), known professionally as Marius Bear, is a Swiss singer. He represented Switzerland in the Eurovision Song Contest 2022 in Turin, Italy, with the song "Boys Do Cry".

== Biography ==
Marius Bear is originally from Appenzell. He has lived in Australia for a period and holds both Swiss and Australian citizenship. He studied to be a construction mechanic and has been active as a musician since 2016, studying music production at the British and Irish Modern Music Institute. He began his career as a street musician in his native Switzerland, as well as in Germany.

He released his debut EP, Sanity, in 2018. His first album, Not Loud Enough, was released in 2019.

In 2019, he won a Swiss Music Award in the category "Best Talent".

In March 2022, it was announced that Marius Bear would represent Switzerland in the Eurovision Song Contest 2022, with the song "Boys Do Cry". The song qualified from the first semi final and finished 17th with 78 points, all of which came from the jury vote. In an interview after the contest, he said that he would consider representing Switzerland at Eurovision in the future.

In October 2022, he released the single Waiting For Love, which he revealed was almost selected as his song for Eurovision.

== Discography ==
=== Studio albums ===
| Title | Details | Peak chart positions |
| Title | Details | SWI |
|---|---|---|
| Not Loud Enough | Released: 13 December 2019; Label: Hi-Tea; Formats: Digital download, streaming | 20 |
| Boys Do Cry | Released: 25 March 2022; Label: Hi-Tea; Formats: Digital download, streaming | 5 |

=== Extended plays ===
| Title | Details | Peak chart positions |
| Title | Details | SWI |
|---|---|---|
| Sanity | Released: 13 July 2018; Label: Self-released; Formats: Digital download, streaming | 36 |
| Slowmotional | Released: 10 November 2023; Label: My Crown; Formats: Digital download, streaming | — |
| When We Get There We'll Know | Released: 26 April 2024; Label: Hi-Tea; Formats: Digital download, streaming | — |
"—" denotes a recording that did not chart or was not released in that territory.

=== Singles ===
| Title | Year | Peak chart positions | | | Album or EP |
| Title | Year | SUI | LTU | NLD Tip | Album or EP |
|---|---|---|---|---|---|
| "I'm a Man" | 2017 | — | — | — | Non-album single |
| "Sanity" | 2018 | — | — | — | Sanity |
| "Roots" | 2018 | — | — | — | Sanity |
| "Remember Me" | 2018 | — | — | — | Sanity |
| "Blood of My Heartbeat" | 2019 | — | — | — | Not Loud Enough |
| "Come What May" | 2019 | — | — | — | Not Loud Enough |
| "Not Loud Enough" | 2019 | — | — | — | Not Loud Enough |
| "Now or Never" | 2020 | — | — | — | Non-album single |
| "I Wanna Dance with Somebody (Who Loves Me)" | 2020 | 74 | — | — | Boys Do Cry |
| "High Notes" | 2020 | — | — | — | Boys Do Cry |
| "Heart on Your Doorstep" | 2021 | — | — | — | Boys Do Cry |
| "Waiting on the World to Change" (with Pat Burgener) | 2021 | — | — | — | Non-album single |
| "Roses" | 2021 | — | — | — | Boys Do Cry |
| "Evergreen" | 2021 | — | — | — | Non-album single |
| "Boys Do Cry" | 2022 | 32 | 45 | 30 | Boys Do Cry |
| "Waiting for Love" | 2022 | — | — | — | Non-album singles |
| "Again" (with Stress) | 2022 | 74 | — | — | Non-album singles |
| "Mond" | 2023 | — | — | — | Non-album singles |
| "Chinder si" (with L Loko & Drini) | 2023 | — | — | — | Am Endi wird alles guet |
| "Butterflies" | 2023 | — | — | — | Slowmotional |
| "I fahre hai für d'Wiehnacht" | 2023 | — | — | — | Non-album single |
| "Kiss Me in the Morning" | 2024 | — | — | — | When We Get There We'll Know |
| "Boulders" | 2024 | — | — | — | When We Get There We'll Know |
| "Forever" | 2025 | — | — | — | Non-album single |
| "When We Get There We'll Know" | 2025 | — | — | — | When We Get There We'll Know 2.0 |
| "Horizon" | 2025 | — | — | — | Non-album single |
"—" denotes a recording that did not chart or was not released in that territory.

== Filmography ==
- I Can See Your Voice (season 1, 2020) – Mystery singer

== Awards and nominations ==
| Year | Award | Category | Work | Result | Ref. |
|---|---|---|---|---|---|
| 2019 | Swiss Music Awards | Best Talent | Himself | Won | |
| 2022 | MTV Europe Music Awards | Best Swiss Act | Himself | Nominated | |
| 2023 | Swiss Music Awards | Best Breaking Act | Himself | Won | |

Awards and achievements
| Preceded by Gjon's Tears with "Tout l'univers" | Switzerland in the Eurovision Song Contest; 2022 | Succeeded by Remo Forrer with "Watergun" |
