= Gisele Abramoff =

Brazilian Pop Dance singer and songwriter

- Born: 1977 or 1978; Rio de Janeiro, Brazil
- Genres: Electronic; Dance; House
- Occupations: singer, songwriter
- Website: giseleabramoff.com

Gisele Abramoff (born in Rio de Janeiro, Brazil) is a Brazilian singer and songwriter best known for having been the lead singer of musical group Dalimas.

After the group's dissolution, Abramoff continued as a solo artist, releasing singles and participating in remixes. She is now based in Munich, Germany.

== Early and personal life ==
Gisele Abramoff was born in Rio de Janeiro, and she was born in either 1977 or 1978. Abramoff began her career at 16 years old by creating music for telenovelas. Gisele Abramoff is married and living with her family in Munich.

== Career ==
=== As the lead vocalist of Dalimas ===
The logo of Dalimas.

She was the vocalist of Brazilian electronic dance music group Dalimas, which she formed in 2003 with producer Tibor Yuzo and DJ Tom Hopkins. The group began informally when Gisele Abramoff recorded a dance-remix of “Livin’ on a Prayer” (originally by Bon Jovi) purely for fun. The reinterpretation gained unexpected traction in Brazilian dance clubs and radio playlists, prompting the collaborators to pursue more formal releases. The group’s recorded output mixes dance-oriented covers of international pop/rock hits with original material.

Following that initial success, the group recorded “Angel” and “Dreams” (the latter credited as written by Gisele Abramoff). These tracks helped solidify Dalimas’ reputation in the Brazilian dance music scene.

By 2004, Dalimas had acquired enough visibility to appear on major dance music stages. At the 2004 Planet Pop Festival — a two-day festival held in São Paulo — Gisele Abramoff performed “Livin’ on a Prayer” and “Dreams” before a crowd reportedly exceeding 7,000 people. On the same evening, European acts such as Lasgo and Ian Van Dahl also appeared.

The following year, in 2005, Dalimas returned to the Planet Pop Festival, sharing the bill with international dance artists including Jan Wayne, Cuva, and Magic Box.

In December 2005, Dalimas released their first (and only) album, Dreams, through Building Records. The album contained both original songs and dance covers of well-known hits, including Guns N' Roses' Sweet Child O' Mine, Bon Jovi's Livin' on a Prayer, The Outfield's Your Love and Everlasting Love. In 2006, she performed at the TV show Superpop presented by Luciana Gimenez.

By 2006, the group had developed a dedicated fan base. They maintained an official fan club and an online community of approximately 6,000 members on Orkut (a now-defunct social network that was hugely popular in Brazil). That year, at the Planet Pop Festival, Gisele performed songs from the group's debut album Dreams before an estimated audience of 10,000, again sharing a night with Lasgo and Ian Van Dahl. Also in 2006, the group recorded the song Let's Get Loud, produced and composed by Mister Jam.

The group announced its break up in 2007. Dalimas is remembered in Brazilian dance-music circles primarily as a mid-2000s dance project that combined Eurodance production with a pop vocal approach. The project received visibility through festival appearances and the circulation of its dance covers in clubs.

=== Solo career ===
In addition with her work at Dalimas, she previously performed in the weekly dominical Rede Globo show Domingão do Faustão, as a member of Edinho Santa Cruz's band for two years.

In April 2007, she was featured in a remix of Tiko's Groove song Say it Right. That year, she composed Last Forever in partnership with Edinho Santa Cruz, which was featured in his album.

In 2019, Abramoff released 3 singles: Run To Me, Like You and Something which peaked at number 1 on the digital website DJ Pool in June, and the third place on House Charts.

On 19 August 2020, she participated in the RTL TV show I Can See Your Voice, and performed Jennifer Lopez' hit song Let's Get Loud, and Alicia Keys' song If I Ain't Got You.

In 2020, Abramoff signed with Universal Music Brazil and DJ Sound Music for new releases such as Lockdown. The same year, she performed the vocals for Samba do Noite by DJ Roger Sanchez (The S-Man).

== Discography ==
=== Tracks of "Dreams" by Dalimas ===
1. Sweet Child O' Mine
2. Livin' on a Prayer
3. Lies
4. Dangerous
5. Shine
6. Your Love
7. I Feel You Tonight
8. Without Love
9. Angel
10. Walking Alone
11. Dreams
12. Never Gonna Say Goodbye
13. Everlasting Love
14. Living On A Prayer (Acoustic)
15. Your Love (Acoustic)
16. Angel (Acoustic)
17. Dreams (Acoustic)

=== Solo albums ===
- 2007 - Say It Right (remix)
- 2019 - Run To Me
- 2019 - Something
- 2019 - Like You
- 2020 - Samba do Noite
- 2021 - Lockdown
