= Für Dich (Vanessa Mai album) =

Studio album by Vanessa Mai
- Released: 2016
- Genre: Pop
- Length: 46:49
- Label: Ariola
- Producer: Dieter Bohlen

Vanessa Mai chronology
Wachgeküsst (2015)	Für Dich (2016)	Regenbogen (2017)

Für Dich (also spelled Für dich; "For You") is a 2016 album by German singer Vanessa Mai.

== Track listing ==
1. "Ich sterb für dich"
2. "Wie ein Blitz"
3. "Ich hör auf mein Herz"
4. "Phänomenal"
5. "Herz an Herz"
6. "Ohne dich"
7. "Meilenweit"
8. Willst du oder nicht"
9. "Du und ich"
10. "Wir sind heut schwindelfrei"
11. "Ich liebe dich"
12. "Für dich" (Yvonne Catterfeld cover)
13. "Wunder gibt's nicht nur im Himmel"
14. "Kann's nicht glauben"

== Charts ==
Chart performance for Für Dich
Chart (2016)	Peak position
German Albums (Offizielle Top 100)	4
Austrian Albums (Ö3 Austria)	4
Swiss Albums (Schweizer Hitparade)	6
