= The Voice of Switzerland season 3 =

Season of television series

The Voice of Switzerland
- Season 3
- Hosted by: Christa Rigozzi; Max Loong
- Coaches: DJ Antoine; Anna Rossinelli; Noah Veraguth; Büetzer Buebe
- Winner: Remo Forrer
- Winning coach: Noah Veraguth

Release
- Original network: 3+
- Original release: January 27 – April 6, 2020

The third season of the talent show The Voice of Switzerland premiered on January 27, 2020 on 3+. The four new coaches were the House-DJ and music producer DJ Antoine, the singer-songwriter Anna Rossinelli, the band musician Noah Veraguth from Pegasus and the duo Büetzer Buebe consisting of the two dialect singers Gölä and Trauffer. The two new hosts were Christa Rigozzi and Max Loong.

Remo Forrer from team Noah Veraguth, was named the winner of the season on April 6, 2020.

== Teams ==
Colour key:

- Winner
- Runner-up
- Eliminated in the Sing Off
- Eliminated in the Battles

Coach	Top 56 Artists				
DJ Antoine	Diego Daniele	Axel Marena	Marisol Redondo	Chloé Sautereau	Valentina Demasi
DJ Antoine	Dalja Heiniger	Nahum Gonzalez	Noemi Ferrai	Arnat Phanitram	Tobias Degen
DJ Antoine	Juan Cecilia & Juan Elias	Alison Gürtler	Mathea Oberholzer	Reyn Ffoulkes	
Anna Rossinelli	Lorena Beadini	Drilona Musa	Zoe Beretta	Patrice Godefroid	Vanessa Torosian
Anna Rossinelli	Gion Gruenberg	Jella Friedrich	Nortasha Dayang	Aron Egger	Igor Iov
Anna Rossinelli	Tatjana Ivanovic	Merel De Leur	Tina Umbricht	Marlou Bolg	
Noah Veraguth	Remo Forrer	Meo Dalgic	Urs Bühler	Christoph Brötie	Vincenzo Polito
Noah Veraguth	Alexandra Papadopoulos	Giuseppe Audino	Desirée Rodenas Vazquez	Marc Shadow	Marina Filoni-Trulec
Noah Veraguth	Fabienne Kobel	Omar Gueye	Morena Guirao	Katja Zumsteg	
Büetzer Buebe	Martina Vogel	Jacky Widmer	Dianete Celmira Da Silva	Rafael Ferrer	Sascha Krucker
Büetzer Buebe	Cecile Centeno	Sean-Henry Saldavia	Luca Affolter	Hanspeter Zweifel	Auguste Jankauskaite
Büetzer Buebe	Jasmin Di Pietro-Hirt	Melissa Hüsler	Lea von Mentlen	Sandro Beeler	

== Blind auditions ==
The castings for the third season took place in spring 2019, but were not shown on television. The blind auditions were from 26 to 29 November 2019 in Nobeo-Studio in Hürth in Cologne recorded and aired from January 27 to March 9, 2020 to seven episodes.

== Battle rounds ==
The battle rounds were recorded on January 23 and 24, 2020 in Hürth and broadcast on three episodes from March 16 to 30, 2020.

Color key

Artist won the Battle and advanced to the Sing-offs
Artist lost the Battle and was eliminated

Episode	Coach	Order	Winner	Song	Loser
Episode 8 (March 16)	DJ Antoine	1	Dalja Heiniger	"Cheap Thrills"	Reyn Ffoulkes
Episode 8 (March 16)	DJ Antoine	2	Nahum Gonzalez	"La Cintura"	Juan Cecilia & Juan Elias
Episode 8 (March 16)	DJ Antoine	3	Diego Daniele	"Summer Wine"	Mathea Oberholzer
Episode 8 (March 16)	DJ Antoine	4	Axel Marena	"Kids"	Alison Gürtler
Episode 8 (March 16)	DJ Antoine	5	Chloé Sautereau	"No One"	Tobias Degen
Episode 8 (March 16)	DJ Antoine	6	Marisol Redondo	"Señorita"	Arnat Phanitram
Episode 8 (March 16)	DJ Antoine	7	Valentina Demasi	"Nothing Compares 2 U"	Noemi Ferrai
Episode 8 (March 16)	Anna	1	Jella Friedrich	"Crazy"	Marlou Bolg
Episode 8 (March 16)	Anna	2	Gion Gruenberg	"Budapest"	Tina Umbricht
Episode 8 (March 16)	Anna	3	Drilona Musa	"You've Got the Love"	Merel De Leur
Episode 8 (March 16)	Anna	4	Vanessa Torosian	"Royals"	Tatjana Ivanovic
Episode 8 (March 16)	Anna	5	Patrice Godefroid	"Somebody That I Used to Know"	Igor Iov
Episode 8 (March 16)	Anna	6	Zoe Beretta	"You Oughta Know"	Aron Egger
Episode 8 (March 16)	Anna	7	Lorena Beadini	"Be the One"	Nortasha Dayang
Episode 9 (March 23)	Büetzer Buebe	1	Martina Vogel	"The Best"	Sandro Beeler
Episode 9 (March 23)	Büetzer Buebe	2	Rafael Ferrer	"Can't Stop the Feeling!"	Lea von Mentlen
Episode 9 (March 23)	Büetzer Buebe	3	Sean-Henry Saldavia	"Love Yourself"	Melissa Hüsler
Episode 9 (March 23)	Büetzer Buebe	4	Sascha Krucker	"Hemmigslos liebe"	Jasmin Di Pietro-Hirt
Episode 9 (March 23)	Büetzer Buebe	5	Cecile Centeno	"Stronger (What Doesn't Kill You)"	Auguste Jankauskaite
Episode 9 (March 23)	Büetzer Buebe	6	Dianete Celmira Da Silva	"Shallow"	Hanspeter Zweifel
Episode 9 (March 23)	Büetzer Buebe	7	Jacky Widmer	"Jailhouse Rock"	Luca Affolter
Episode 10 (March 30)	Noah	1	Giuseppe Audino	"Us Mänsch"	Katja Zumsteg
Episode 10 (March 30)	Noah	2	Alexandra Papadopoulos	"Flashlight"	Morena Guirao
Episode 10 (March 30)	Noah	3	Vincenzo Polito	"Più bella cosa"	Omar Gueye
Episode 10 (March 30)	Noah	4	Christoph Brötie	"You Are the Reason"	Fabienne Kobel
Episode 10 (March 30)	Noah	5	Meo Dalgic	"More Than Words"	Marina Filoni-Trulec
Episode 10 (March 30)	Noah	6	Urs Bühler	"Every Breath You Take"	Marc Shadow
Episode 10 (March 30)	Noah	7	Remo Forrer	"Say You Won't Let Go"	Desirée Rodenas Vazquez

== Sing offs ==
The sign offs were recorded on January 23 and 24, 2020 in Hürth and broadcast on three episodes from March 16 to 30, 2020, with the battle rounds episodes.

Color key

Artist won the Sing-off and advanced to the Live Final
Artist lost the Sing-off and was eliminated

Episode	Coach	Order	Artist	Song	Result
Episode 8 (March 16)	DJ Antoine	1	Nahum Gonzalez	"Mi culpa"	Eliminated
Episode 8 (March 16)	DJ Antoine	2	Dalja Heiniger	"7 Rings"	Eliminated
Episode 8 (March 16)	DJ Antoine	3	Valentina Demasi	"Million Reasons"	Eliminated
Episode 8 (March 16)	DJ Antoine	4	Axel Marena	"Superstition"	Advanced
Episode 8 (March 16)	DJ Antoine	5	Chloé Sautereau	"La Vie en rose"	Eliminated
Episode 8 (March 16)	DJ Antoine	6	Marisol Redondo	"Whenever, Wherever"	Eliminated
Episode 8 (March 16)	DJ Antoine	7	Diego Daniele	"Breathe Easy"	Advanced
Episode 8 (March 16)	Anna	1	Jella Friedrich	"Love on the Brain"	Eliminated
Episode 8 (March 16)	Anna	2	Gion Gruenberg	"Creep"	Eliminated
Episode 8 (March 16)	Anna	3	Drilona Musa	"Toxic"	Advanced
Episode 8 (March 16)	Anna	4	Vanessa Torosian	"God Is a Woman"	Eliminated
Episode 8 (March 16)	Anna	5	Patrice Godefroid	"My Generation"	Eliminated
Episode 8 (March 16)	Anna	6	Zoe Beretta	"Riptide"	Eliminated
Episode 8 (March 16)	Anna	7	Lorena Beadini	"All About That Bass"	Advanced
Episode 9 (March 23)	Büetzer Buebe	1	Martina Vogel	"Folsom Prison Blues"	Advanced
Episode 9 (March 23)	Büetzer Buebe	2	Sean-Henry Saldavia	"Sex Bomb"	Eliminated
Episode 9 (March 23)	Büetzer Buebe	3	Cecile Centeno	"Chandelier"	Eliminated
Episode 9 (March 23)	Büetzer Buebe	4	Sascha Krucker	"Der Weg"	Eliminated
Episode 9 (March 23)	Büetzer Buebe	5	Rafael Ferrer	"Despacito"	Eliminated
Episode 9 (March 23)	Büetzer Buebe	6	Dianete Celmira Da Silva	"Jolene"	Eliminated
Episode 9 (March 23)	Büetzer Buebe	7	Jacky Widmer	"Highway to Hell"	Advanced
Episode 10 (March 30)	Noah	1	Giuseppe Audino	"Ganz, ganz easy (Despacito)"	Eliminated
Episode 10 (March 30)	Noah	2	Alexandra Papadopoulos	"Set Fire to the Rain"	Eliminated
Episode 10 (March 30)	Noah	3	Vincenzo Polito	"Adesso tu"	Eliminated
Episode 10 (March 30)	Noah	4	Christoph Brötie	"Say Something"	Eliminated
Episode 10 (March 30)	Noah	5	Meo Dalgic	"The A Team"	Advanced
Episode 10 (March 30)	Noah	6	Urs Bühler	"Hemmige"	Eliminated
Episode 10 (March 30)	Noah	7	Remo Forrer	"Someone You Loved"	Advanced

== Final ==
The live show final was originally scheduled to take place on March 30, 2020 in Hürth, but all events were canceled there due to the coronavirus pandemic. Instead, the final was broadcast on April 6, 2020, showing the candidates, coaches, and presenters with footage from their living rooms.

Order	Coach	Artist	Song	Result
1	Büetzer Buebe	Jacky Widmer	"I Love Rock 'n' Roll"	Runner-up
2	DJ Antoine	Diego Daniele	"Wrecking Ball"	Runner-up
3	Anna	Drilona Musa	"Dance Monkey"	Runner-up
4	Noah	Meo Dalgic	"Just the Way You Are"	Runner-up
5	Büetzer Buebe	Martina Vogel	"Johnny B. Goode"	Runner-up
6	DJ Antoine	Axel Marena	"Want to Want Me"	Runner-up
7	Anna	Lorena Beadini	"Elastic Heart"	Runner-up
8	Noah	Remo Forrer	"Sign of the Times"	Winner
