= Boys Do Cry (song) =

2022 song by Marius Bear

Single by Marius Bear

from the album Boys Do Cry
- Language: English
- Released: 8 March 2022
- Length: 2:57
- Label: Hi-Tea Records
- Songwriters: Marius Hugli; Martin Gallop

Music video
- "Boys Do Cry" on YouTube

Eurovision Song Contest 2022 entry
- Country: Switzerland
- Artist: Marius Bear
- Language: English
- Composers: Marius Hugli; Martin Gallop
- Lyricists: Marius Hugli; Martin Gallop

Finals performance
- Semi-final result: 9th
- Semi-final points: 118
- Final result: 17th
- Final points: 78

Entry chronology
- ◄ "Tout l'univers" (2021)
- "Watergun" (2023) ►

"Boys Do Cry" is a song by Swiss singer Marius Bear which was released as a single on 8 March 2022. The song represented Switzerland in the Eurovision Song Contest 2022 in Turin, Italy after being internally selected by SRG SSR, Switzerland's broadcaster for the Eurovision Song Contest.

== Background ==
According to Bear, the song is about the fact that all people feel pain, including men. The song speaks that people should not ignore feelings, and that people should encourage others do so. Bear, in an interview, said: "I learnt very early on that I don’t need to be ashamed of my feelings. As a man, I’m not afraid to cry and to lay bare my weaknesses to my audience. I don’t want to wear emotional armour, I want to be who I am. And I want to encourage my audience to do the same.”

== Release ==
The song was released on 8 March 2022 on the Eurovision Song Contest's official YouTube channel, with a premiere livestream.

== Eurovision Song Contest ==
=== Selection ===
In early April 2021, SRG SSR confirmed their intention to participate at the Eurovision Song Contest 2022, opening applications to be part of the selecting committee. On 16 June 2021, the broadcaster published the rules for artists to apply for its internal selection process. Submissions were open between 1 and 15 September 2021.

The selection involved a panel of 100 Swiss viewers – as selected between April and June – alongside a specialized international 23-member jury, composed of former judges in their respective countries. Each panel accounted for 50% of the voting, which was articulated in various undisclosed phases and decided the Swiss act for Eurovision before the end of the year.

Marius Bear was confirmed the entrant for Switzerland in a YouTube premiere on the Eurovision Song Contest's official channel, along with the release of "Boys Do Cry".

=== At Eurovision ===
According to Eurovision rules, all nations with the exceptions of the host country and the "Big Five" (France, Germany, Italy, Spain and the United Kingdom) are required to qualify from one of two semi-finals in order to compete for the final; the top ten countries from each semi-final progress to the final. The European Broadcasting Union (EBU) split up the competing countries into six different pots based on voting patterns from previous contests, with countries with favourable voting histories put into the same pot. On 25 January 2022, an allocation draw was held which placed each country into one of the two semi-finals, as well as which half of the show they would perform in. Switzerland was placed into the first semi-final, held on 10 May 2022, and performed in the first half of the show. The song was awarded 78 points from the national juries, but received zero points from the televote.

== Charts ==
Chart performance for "Boys Do Cry"
| Chart (2022) | Peak position |
|---|---|
| Lithuania (AGATA) | 45 |
| Netherlands (Single Tip) | 30 |
| Switzerland (Schweizer Hitparade) | 32 |
| UK Singles Downloads (OCC) | 60 |
