= I Can See Your Voice (German game show) season 3 =

Television game show season

I Can See Your Voice
- Season 3
- Starring: Jorge González
- Hosted by: Various (Note: Season highlights: Daniel Hartwich was supposed to host the 3rd season entirely before he tested positive for COVID-19. Hartwich would subsequently replace by interim hosts such as Oliver Pocher (ep. 2), Laura Wontorra (ep. 3), Jan Köppen (ep. 4), Sonja Zietlow (ep. 5), and Oliver Geissen (ep. 6).; Foreign guest artist: Ilse DeLange (The Common Linnets) (NLD; ep. 5))
- Winners: Good singers: 5; Bad singers: 1
- No. of episodes: 6

Release
- Original network: RTL
- Original release: 24 July – 3 September 2022

Season chronology
- ← Previous; Season 2 (as I Can See Your Voice)

The third season of the German television mystery music game show I Can See Your Voice premiered on RTL, renaming as Zeig uns Deine Stimme! (transl. Show us your voice!), with first half episodes in its prime time slot on 24 July 2022, followed by a second that resumed in its late night scheduling on 20 August 2022. (Note: Episodes for 2nd half of its 3rd season have been originally scheduled for 14, 21, and 28 August 2022. However, poor reception in the 1st half forced to end the season prematurely, which was later rescheduled to 20, 27 August and 3 September 2022.)

== Gameplay ==
=== Format ===
According to the original South Korean rules, the guest artist and contestants must attempt to eliminate bad singers during its game phase. At the final performance, the last remaining mystery singer is revealed as either good or bad by means of a duet between them and one of the guest artists.

The contestants must eliminate one mystery singer at the end of each round, receiving €2,500 if they eliminate a bad singer. At the end of a game, if the contestants decide to walk away, they will keep the money had won in previous rounds; if they decide to risk for the last remaining mystery singer, they win €25,000 if a singer is good, or lose their all winnings if a singer is bad.

=== Rounds ===
1. Full playback (German: Vollplayback)
  The mystery singer lip syncs to the good singer's recording, then a bad singer's recording comes in the middle of the performance.
2. Tune it up! (German: 3, 2, 1... Ton an!)
  A muted video of each mystery singer that reveals only 0.3 seconds of their singing voice is played as an additional hint.
3. Fact or fake? (German: Fakt oder Fake?)
  The guest artist and contestants are presented with a video package containing possible clues by one of the mystery singers.
4. Cross-examination (German: Kreuzverhör)
  The guest artist and contestants may ask questions to the remaining mystery singers. Good singers are required to give truthful responses, while the bad singers must lie.

== Episodes ==
=== Guest artists ===
Legend:
Good singer
Bad singer
— The contestants chose to risk the money.
— The contestants chose to walk away with the money.

Episode		Guest artist (Note: Players' notes: For the returning guest artists (who also include foreigners and former good singers), names are displayed in italics.; For the mixed groups, names who identified as bad singers are displayed in italics.)	Contestants	Mystery singers (In their respective numbers and aliases)							
#	Date	Guest artist	Contestants	Elimination order							Winner
#	Date	Guest artist	Contestants	Full playback				Tune it up!	Fact or fake?	Cross-examination	Winner
1	24 July 2022	Yvonne Catterfeld	Nico and Jonathan → €10,000	8. Ornella Mikwasa; (Forwarding Clerk)	4. Mark Selinger; (P.E. Teacher)	6. Chiara Schumann; (Fashion Design Student)	3. Melanie Anton; (Chambermaid)	2. Paul Fentz; (Figure Skater)	1. Tina Feichtlbauer; (Folk Dancer)	7. Adrian Jaha; (Financial Adviser)	5. Claus Ostertag; Lingerie Vendor
2	31 July 2022	Tim Bendzko	Kerstin and Melinda → €12,500	2. Alfredo Cleto Batista; (Plumber)	1. Jana Blasius; (Stewardess)	7. Jens Bubenek; (Boyband Fan)	3. Jessica Movahed Fard; (Hairdresser)	6. Amina Majetić; (Conductor)	5. Werner Hohenegger; (Magician)	8. Roli-Ann Neubauer; (Basketball Player)	4. Remo Forrer; Real Estate Agent
3	7 August 2022	Thomas Anders (Modern Talking)	Tanja and Stefan → €25,000	6. Onaquel Herbas; (Graphic Designer)	3. Kolinda Brozovic; (Trekkie)	4. Patric Scott; (Cellist)	5. Laila Nahara; (Belly Dancer)	2. William Pfeiffer; (Building Janitor)	7. Aylin Madenci; (Karateka)	8. Mike Lancero; (DJ)	1. Kira Reed; Tennis Player
4	20 August 2022	Giovanni Zarrella (Bro'Sis)	Magdalena and Amelie → €25,000	2. Tatjana Schulte; (Meghan Markle Lookalike)	3. Torsten Rico Hoffmann; (Prison Officer)	1. Julia Schmid; (World Line Dancing Champion)	5. Emma Stappenbeck; (Rhythmic Gymnast)	8. Mirco Köstring; (Wedding Singer)	6. Alexandra Kiefer; (Hardware Store Cashier)	4. Karolin Konert; (Psychologist)	7. Christopher Clark; Wedding Receptionist
5	27 August 2022	Ilse DeLange (The Common Linnets)	Silke and Kurt → €10,000	8. Maria Krämer; (Model)	4. Sylvie Heudecker; (Stuntwoman)	3. Arina Prokofyeva; (Pole Dancer)	6. Sandra Zuna; (Cosplayer)	1. Isaak Guderian; (Scout)	2. Chananja Schulz; (Gospel Singer)	7. Markus Lunau; (Funeral Speaker)	5. Mick Hey; Painter
6	3 September 2022	Johannes Strate (Revolverheld)	Nathalie and Peter → €0	3. Valeria Lav; (Physician Assistant)	4. Claudia Homberg; (Cheerleader)	7. Kathrin Eftekhari; (Firefighter)	1. Natascha Gurt; (Paramedic)	5. Daniel Johnson; (Bartender)	8. Christian Deußen; (Guard Dancer)	6. Janine Bachata; (Salsa Dancer)	2. Rudi Enns; Equestrian

=== Panelists ===
Legend:
Regular panelist
Guest panelist

Apps		Panelists in attendance (Sorted by first appearance, with episode designations)
g#	p#	Panelists in attendance (Sorted by first appearance, with episode designations)
3	1	Jorge González (2–4)
2	5	Max Giermann (1–2); Thomas Hermanns (1, 6); Evelyn Burdecki (2, 6); Max Mutzke (3, 5); Frank Buschmann (3, 6)
1	11	Chantal Janzen and Anna Loos (1); Sasha (2); Mirja Boes (3); Bülent Ceylan, Tim Mälzer, and Judith Williams (4); Reiner Calmund, Sarah Engels, and Uwe Ochsenknecht (5); DJ Ötzi (6)

== Reception ==
Legend:
Highest rated episode
Lowest rated episode

No.	Title	Air date	Timeslot (CET)	Share			Viewership			Ref(s)
No.	Title	Air date	Timeslot (CET)	Grp. 18–49	Cons.	Comb.	Grp. 18–49	Cons.	Total	Ref(s)
1	"Yvonne Catterfeld"	24 July 2022	Sunday, 20:15	7.5%	5.4%	6.5%	0.34	0.85	1.19	
2	"Tim Bendzko"	31 July 2022	Sunday, 20:15	5.3%	4.5%	4.9%	0.35	0.82	1.17	
3	"Thomas Anders"	7 August 2022	Sunday, 20:15	5.5%	4.1%	4.8%	0.27	0.68	0.95	
4	"Giovanni Zarella"	20 August 2022	Saturday, 00:55	Not reported						
5	"Ilse DeLange"	27 August 2022	Saturday, 00:35	Not reported						
6	"Johannes Strate"	3 September 2022	Saturday, 00:35	Not reported						

Source: AGF Videoforschung
