= Jalal Tehrani =

Iranian playwright and director

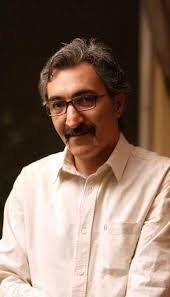
- Born: August 3, 1968 (age 58); Tehran, Iran
- Education: M.A. in Dramatic Literature
- Occupations: Playwright, theatre director, educator

Jalal Tehrani (Persian: جلال تهرانی; born 3 August 1968) is an Iranian playwright, theatre director, and educator. He is known for experimental works that emphasize theatrical form and structure. According to the International Journal of Middle East Studies, he has contributed to the development of Iran’s independent theatre through his institute Maktab Tehran.

His other activities include essay writing, set and lighting design, and screenwriting. Some of his plays have been translated into other languages.

== Early life and education ==
Tehrani was born in Tehran in August 1968. Before pursuing theatre, he studied electronics and worked in product design. He later earned a master’s degree in Dramatic Literature.

== Career ==
=== Early writing and directing ===
Tehrani began as a theatre critic in the late 1990s before publishing his first play, The Boatman, in 1998. His directorial debut was of Nefertiti (2002), staged at the City Theater of Tehran. He subsequently directed the production of The Tank (2002) and Single Cells (2003). All three plays were authored by Tehrani himself. The Tank was later revived at Maktab Tehran, an event covered by the Financial Tribune.

Both The Tank and Single Cells were staged at Molavi Hall in Tehran. The play Hey Big Guy, Don’t Cry was also written by him and was performed in the Main Hall of the City Theatre of Tehran.

During the same period, play readings of the works Hey Big Guy, Don’t Cry and Nostalgia were also held at the Iranian Artists Forum and the City Theatre.

His first critical essay, on Akbar Radi's play Hamlet with Seasonal Salad, was published in Sahneh quarterly. The same journal had also published his first full-length play, The Boatman.

=== Withdrawal from the stage ===
From 2005 to 2008, Tehrani devoted himself to writing and research. In 2006 and 2007 he wrote the feature-length screenplay Mercy, which took part in the Toronto International Film Festival in 2007. Between 2008 and 2009 he also wrote four other feature-length screenplays: Shawl, It’s Raining in Hell, The Story Is Over, and Deafness.

=== Maktab Tehran ===
In 2010, Tehrani founded Maktab Tehran, an institute that includes a theatre hall, rehearsal studios, a publishing unit, and educational programs. Researchers have noted that the emergence of such private institutions reflects broader developments in Iran’s theatre scene. Together with his students, Tehrani has held thirteen festivals at the Tehran School.

=== Later works ===
His later productions include Cinderella, Kite Hunting Season, Around the World in Eighty Days, and Silver. In 2014, Tehrani’s adaptation of Cinderella was staged in Tehran, reported by *The Iran Project*. The play has also been subject to academic analysis in Iran.

== Style and philosophy ==
Tehrani's works are characterized by an emphasis on form and structure rather than explicit themes. His scripts often use stylized language that critics describe as poetic and unconventional. The international journal *Critical Stages* highlights his strategies for addressing censorship in Iranian theatre.

== International reception ==
Single Cells was staged at the Silk Road Festival in Ruhr and later presented at Iran Cultural Week in Berlin. The play was later published in French under the title Les unicellulaires.

== Selected works ==
- The Boatman (1998) – his first published play
- Nefertiti (2002) – directorial debut at Tehran’s City Theater
- The Tank (2002; revived 2018 at Maktab Tehran)
- Single Cells (2003) – staged internationally; later published in French as Les unicellulaires
- Cinderella (2014) – adaptation staged in Tehran
