= I Can See Your Voice (German game show) =

German television game show

- Genre: Game show
- Based on: I Can See Your Voice by CJ ENM
- Directed by: Bastien Angemeer; Markus Küttner
- Presented by: Daniel Hartwich
- Starring: The celebrity panelists (see cast)
- Country of origin: Germany
- Original language: German
- No. of seasons: 3
- No. of episodes: 14

Production
- Executive producers: Tobias Cullmann; Anja Heinen
- Producer: Tina Allert
- Camera setup: Multi-camera
- Production company: Tresor TV

Original release
- Network: RTL
- Release: 18 August 2020 – 3 September 2022

Related
- I Can See Your Voice franchise

I Can See Your Voice is a German television mystery music game show based on the South Korean programme of the same title, featuring its format where guest artist(s) and contestant(s) attempt to eliminate bad singers from the group, until the last mystery singer remains for a duet performance. It first aired on RTL on 18 August 2020.

== Gameplay ==
=== Format ===
Over the course of several rounds, the guest artist(s) and contestant(s) must attempt to eliminate bad singers from a group of "mystery singers", identified only by their occupation or alias, without ever hearing them perform live. They are assisted by clues regarding the singers' backgrounds, style of performance, and observations from a celebrity panel. At the end of a game, the last remaining mystery singer is revealed as either good or bad by means of a duet between them and one of the guest artists. (Note: Gameplay notes: The number of mystery singers are set to seven (from 1st to 2nd season) or eight (for the 3rd season).; The number of contestants are set to one (from 1st to 2nd season) or a pair (for the 3rd season).; The number of rounds are set to four (for the 1st and 3rd seasons) or five (for the 2nd season).)

From the first to second season, if the last remaining mystery singer is good, the contestant(s) win(s) €10,000; this is also applied to the winning bad singer selected by them.

For the third season, the contestants must eliminate one mystery singer at the end of each round, receiving €2,500 if they eliminate a bad singer. At the end of a game, if the contestants decide to walk away, they will keep the money had won in previous rounds; if they decide to risk for the last remaining mystery singer, they win €25,000 if a singer is good, or lose their all winnings if a singer is bad.

=== Rounds ===
==== Visual rounds ====
- First impression (German: Erster Eindruck)

s1–2: The guest artist and contestant(s) are given some time to observe and examine each mystery singer based on their appearance.

- Tune it up! (German: 3, 2, 1... Ton an!)

s3: A muted video of each mystery singer that reveals only 0.3 seconds of their singing voice is played as an additional hint.

==== Lip sync rounds ====
- Lip sync (German: Das Playback)

s1–2: Each mystery singer performs a lip sync to a song; good singers mime to a recording of their own, while bad singers mime to a backing track by another vocalist.

- Full playback (German: Vollplayback)

s3: The mystery singer lip syncs to the good singer's recording, then a bad singer's recording comes in the middle of the performance.

==== Evidence round ====
- Fact or fake? (German: Fakt oder Fake?)

s1–3: The guest artist and contestant(s) are presented with a video package containing possible clues by one of the mystery singers.

==== Rehearsal round ====
- Secret studio (German: Soundcheck)

s2: The guest artist and contestant(s) are presented with video from a recording session by one of the mystery singers, but pitch-shifted to obscure their actual vocals.

==== Interrogation round ====
- Cross-examination (German: Kreuzverhör)

s1–3: The guest artist and contestant(s) may ask questions to the remaining mystery singers. Good singers are required to give truthful responses, while the bad singers must lie.

== Production ==
CJ ENM provisionally announced a German adaptation of I Can See Your Voice through a press release during (South Korean) sixth season of the same title in March 2019; this was subsequently confirmed by RTL Deutschland in June 2020, with Tresor TV assigning on production duties.

== Broadcast history ==
I Can See Your Voice debuted with two-night pilot episodes on 18 and 19 August 2020, as part of RTL's Power Week programming lineup, with filming took place at MMC Studios in Ehrenfeld, Cologne. Because of the viewers' complaints regardless of not implementing health and safety protocols amidst the COVID-19 pandemic, production was halted in an immediate response, prematurely ending the first season; Tresor Television spokesperson Jovan Evermann did even clarify that the federal health department guidelines have been followed properly.

Despite the incident of its previous, RTL formally decided in October 2020 to renew the series for a second season, which premiered on 30 March 2021, one week after fourth season finale of ProSieben's rival show The Masked Singer.

In November 2021, RTL renewed the series for a third season, renaming as Zeig uns Deine Stimme! (transl. Show us your voice!), adopted from a catchphrase by Hartwich before the "stage of truth" performance. It premiered with first half episodes in its prime time slot on 24 July 2022, followed by a second that resumed in its late night scheduling on 20 August 2022. (Note: Episodes for 2nd half of its 3rd season have been originally scheduled for 14, 21, and 28 August 2022. However, poor reception in the 1st half forced to end the season prematurely, which was later rescheduled to 20, 27 August and 3 September 2022.)

== Cast ==
The series employs a panel of celebrity "detectives" who assist the guest artists and contestants in identifying good and bad mystery singers throughout the game. Along with regular members, guest panelists also appear since the second season. Overall, five celebrities have served as panelists, with their original lineup consisting of Evelyn Burdecki, Jorge González, Thomas Hermanns, Tim Mälzer, and Judith Rakers.

Designations:
H Hosting duties
g# Total games attended, by panelists

Cast member	Seasons		
Cast member	1	2	3
Daniel Hartwich	H	H	H (Note: Panelists' note: Daniel Hartwich was supposed to host the 3rd season entirely before he tested positive for COVID-19. Hartwich would subsequently replace by interim hosts such as Oliver Pocher (ep. 2), Laura Wontorra (ep. 3), Jan Köppen (ep. 4), Sonja Zietlow (ep. 5), and Oliver Geissen (ep. 6).)
Evelyn Burdecki	2		
Jorge González	2		3
Thomas Hermanns	2	6	
Tim Mälzer	2	5	
Judith Rakers	2		

== Series overview ==
Series	Episodes	Originally released		Good singers	Bad singers
Series	Episodes	First released	Last released	Good singers	Bad singers
1	2	18 August 2020	19 August 2020	2	0
2	6	30 March 2021	4 May 2021	2	4
3	6	24 July 2022	3 September 2022	5	1

== Episodes ==
=== Season 1 (2020) ===
List of season 1 episodes
No. overall	No. in season	Guest artist(s)	Player order (Note: It refers to the guest artist(s) that have played in according to their first game; returning guest artists (which also include foreigners or former good singers, with their names displaying in italics) are not counted.)	Contestant	Original release date	DEU viewers (millions)	DEU share (national)
1	1	Sasha	1	Nicole	18 August 2020	2.14	12.1%
2	2	Vanessa Mai	2	Picco	19 August 2020	1.85	9.1%

=== Season 2 (2021) ===
List of season 2 episodes
No. overall	No. in season	Guest artist(s)	Player order	Contestant	Original release date	DEU viewers (millions)	DEU share (national)
3	1	The BossHoss	3	Marleen	30 March 2021	2.3	11%
4	2	Barbara Schöneberger	4	Niels	6 April 2021	2.03	8.8%
5	3	Maite Kelly	5	Krissy	13 April 2021	2.04	9%
6	4	Hartmut Engler (Pur)	6	Katja	20 April 2021	1.51	6.2%
7	5	Jeanette Biedermann	7	Jenny	27 April 2021	1.84	8.1%
8	6	Max Mutzke	8	Mandy	4 May 2021	1.9	8.6%

=== Season 3 (2022) ===
List of season 3 episodes
No. overall	No. in season	Guest artist(s)	Player order	Contestants	Original release date	DEU viewers (millions)	DEU share (national)
9	1	Yvonne Catterfeld	9	Nico and Jonathan	24 July 2022	1.19	6.5%
10	2	Tim Bendzko	10	Kerstin and Melinda	31 July 2022	1.17	4.9%
11	3	Thomas Anders (Modern Talking)	11	Tanja and Stefan	7 August 2022	0.95	4.8%
12	4	Giovanni Zarella (Bro'Sis)	12	Magdalena and Amelie	20 August 2022	NR	NR
13	5	Ilse DeLange (The Common Linnets) (Note: Foreign guest artist: Netherlands — Ilse DeLange (The Common Linnets))	13	Silke and Kurt	27 August 2022	NR	NR
14	6	Johannes Strate (Revolverheld)	14	Nathalie and Peter	3 September 2022	NR	NR
