= Norway in the Eurovision Song Contest 2023 =

- Eurovision Song Contest 2023
- Participating broadcaster: Norsk rikskringkasting (NRK)
- Country: Norway
- Selection process: Melodi Grand Prix 2023
- Selection date: 4 February 2023

Competing entry
- Song: "Queen of Kings"
- Artist: Alessandra
- Songwriters: Henning Olerud; Stanley Ferdinandez; Alessandra Mele; Linda Dale

Placement
- Semi-final result: Qualified (6th, 102 points)
- Final result: 5th, 268 points

Participation chronology

Norway was represented at the Eurovision Song Contest 2023 with the song "Queen of Kings" performed by Alessandra. The Norwegian broadcaster Norsk rikskringkasting (NRK) organised the national final Melodi Grand Prix 2023 in order to select the Norwegian entry for the 2023 contest. 21 entries were selected to compete in the national final, which consists of four shows: three semi-finals and a final. Nine entries ultimately qualified to compete in the final on 4 February 2023, and the winner was determined following the combination of votes from ten international jury groups and a public online vote.

Norway qualified from the first semi-final to compete in the grand final on 13 May, ultimately finishing in fifth place with 268 points, the country's highest placing since 2013.

== Background ==
Prior to the 2023 contest, Norway participated in the Eurovision Song Contest sixty-one times since its first entry in 1960. Norway has won the contest on three occasions: in 1985 with the song "La det swinge" performed by Bobbysocks!, in 1995 with the song "Nocturne" performed by Secret Garden and in 2009 with the song "Fairytale" performed by Alexander Rybak. Norway also has the two dubious distinctions of having finished last in the Eurovision final more than any other country and for having the most nul points (zero points) in the contest, the latter being a record the nation shared together with Austria. The country has finished last eleven times and has failed to score a point in four contests. Following the introduction of semi-finals for 2004, Norway has finished in the top ten nine times. In 2022, "Give That Wolf a Banana" performed by Subwoolfer qualified to the final and placed tenth.

The Norwegian national broadcaster, Norsk rikskringkasting (NRK), broadcasts the event within Norway and organises the selection process for the nation's entry. NRK confirmed their intentions to participate at the 2023 Eurovision Song Contest on 6 June 2022. The broadcaster has traditionally organised the national final Melodi Grand Prix, which has selected the Norwegian entry for the Eurovision Song Contest in all but one of their participations. Along with their participation confirmation, the broadcaster revealed details regarding their selection procedure and announced the organization of Melodi Grand Prix 2023 in order to select the 2023 Norwegian entry.

== Before Eurovision ==
=== Melodi Grand Prix 2023 ===
Melodi Grand Prix 2023 was the 61st edition of the Norwegian national final Melodi Grand Prix which selected Norway's entry for the 2023 contest. The competition consisted of three semi-finals at Screen Studios in Nydalen on 14, 21 and 28 February 2023 and a final at the Trondheim Spektrum in Trondheim. The four shows were hosted by Arian Engebø and Stian Thorbjørnsen and were televised on NRK1 and NRK TV as well as streamed online at NRK's official website nrk.no. In each semi-final, seven songs competed and the top three entries were selected to proceed to the final. The results in the semi-finals were determined exclusively by online voting, while the results in the final were determined by online voting and ten international jury groups.

==== Semi-finals ====
- The first semi-final took place on 14 January 2023. "Queen of Kings" performed by Alessandra, "Geronimo" performed by Umami Tsunami and "Honestly" performed by Ulrikke Brandstorp advanced to the final, while "Wave" performed by Eirik Næss, "Tresko" performed by Rasmus Thall, "Tårer i paradis" performed by Kate Gulbrandsen and "Freaky for the Weekend" performed by Byron Williams Jr. & Jowst were eliminated.
- The second semi-final took place on 21 January 2023. "Ekko inni meg" performed by Jone, "Prohibition" performed by Swing'it and "Love You in a Dream" performed by Elsie Bay advanced to the final, while "Drøm d bort" performed by Sandra Lyng, "Fuego" performed by Alejandro Fuentes, "Waist" performed by Ella and "Turn Off My Heart" performed by Bjørn Olav Edvardsen were eliminated.
- The third semi-final took place on 28 January 2023. "Love Again" performed by Skrellex, "Not Meant to Be" performed by Eline Thorp and "Masterpiece" performed by Atle Pettersen advanced to the final, while "Triumph" performed by Akuvi, "Break It" performed by Tiril, "Someday" performed by Stig van Eijk and "Freya" performed by Maria Celin were eliminated.

==== Final ====
The final took place on 4 February 2023.

R/O	Artist	Song	Jury	Televote	Total	Place
1	Jone	"Ekko inni meg"	40	30	70	5
2	Eline Thorp	"Not Meant to Be"	42	18	60	6
3	Skrellex	"Love Again"	14	40	54	7
4	Ulrikke Brandstorp	"Honestly"	60	78	138	2
5	Umami Tsunami	"Geronimo"	19	30	49	9
6	Atle Pettersen	"Masterpiece"	94	28	122	3
7	Swing'it	"Prohibition"	8	43	51	8
8	Elsie Bay	"Love You in a Dream"	49	34	83	4
9	Alessandra	"Queen of Kings"	104	129	233	1

== At Eurovision ==
According to Eurovision rules, all nations with the exceptions of the host country and the "Big Five" (France, Germany, Italy, Spain and the United Kingdom) are required to qualify from one of two semi-finals in order to compete for the final; the top ten countries from each semi-final progress to the final. The European Broadcasting Union (EBU) split up the competing countries into six different pots based on voting patterns from previous contests, with countries with favourable voting histories put into the same pot. On 31 January 2023, an allocation draw was held, which placed each country into one of the two semi-finals, and determined which half of the show they would perform in. Norway has been placed into the first semi-final, to be held on 9 May 2023, and has been scheduled to perform in the first half of the show.

Once all the competing songs for the 2023 contest had been released, the running order for the semi-finals was decided by the shows' producers rather than through another draw, so that similar songs were not placed next to each other. Norway was set to perform in position 1, before the entry from Malta.

At the end of the show, Norway was announced as a qualifier for the final.

=== Voting ===
==== Points awarded to Norway ====
Points awarded to Norway (Semi-final 1)
Score	Televote
12 points	
10 points	Czech Republic; Finland; Israel; Italy; Malta; Sweden
8 points	Moldova
7 points	
6 points	Croatia
5 points	Netherlands; Serbia
4 points	Latvia
3 points	Germany; Portugal; Switzerland
2 points	Azerbaijan; Ireland
1 point	France

Points awarded to Norway (Final)
Score	Televote	Jury
12 points	Finland	
10 points	Denmark; Israel; Italy; Sweden	Denmark; Israel
8 points	Belgium; Iceland; Poland; Spain	Sweden
7 points	Austria; Czech Republic; Estonia; Malta; Netherlands; Ukraine; United Kingdom	
6 points	Australia; Greece; Moldova	Germany
5 points	Croatia; Cyprus; Germany; Ireland; Romania; Serbia; Slovenia	
4 points	Albania; Armenia; Portugal; Rest of the World; San Marino	Armenia; Iceland; Switzerland
3 points	Latvia	
2 points	Azerbaijan; Georgia; Switzerland	Malta; Spain
1 point	France	Portugal; San Marino

==== Points awarded by Norway ====
Points awarded by Norway (Semi-final 1)
Score	Televote
12 points	Finland
10 points	Sweden
8 points	Switzerland
7 points	Czech Republic
6 points	Moldova
5 points	Israel
4 points	Croatia
3 points	Ireland
2 points	Portugal
1 point	Netherlands

Points awarded by Norway (Final)
Score	Televote	Jury
12 points	Finland	Finland
10 points	Sweden	Sweden
8 points	France	Moldova
7 points	Italy	Cyprus
6 points	Poland	Italy
5 points	Switzerland	Australia
4 points	Belgium	Czech Republic
3 points	Israel	Israel
2 points	Cyprus	Switzerland
1 point	Ukraine	Spain

==== Detailed voting results ====
The following members comprised the Norwegian jury:

- Jonas Nes Steinset
- Raymond Enoksen
- Eli Kristin Hanssveen
- Emmy Kristine Guttulsrud Kristiansen
- Mimmi Tamba

Detailed voting results from Norway (Semi-final 1)
R/O	Country	Televote	
R/O	Country	Rank	Points
01	Norway		
02	Malta	14	
03	Serbia	11	
04	Latvia	12	
05	Portugal	9	2
06	Ireland	8	3
07	Croatia	7	4
08	Switzerland	3	8
09	Israel	6	5
10	Moldova	5	6
11	Sweden	2	10
12	Azerbaijan	13	
13	Czech Republic	4	7
14	Netherlands	10	1
15	Finland	1	12

Detailed voting results from Norway (Final)
R/O	Country	Jury							Televote	
R/O	Country	Juror 1	Juror 2	Juror 3	Juror 4	Juror 5	Rank	Points	Rank	Points
01	Austria	19	22	8	21	4	12		19	
02	Portugal	10	8	23	16	16	16		24	
03	Switzerland	5	10	15	6	22	9	2	6	5
04	Poland	15	21	14	18	9	18		5	6
05	Serbia	22	14	16	7	6	13		20	
06	France	7	15	11	19	19	15		3	8
07	Cyprus	11	2	3	17	11	4	7	9	2
08	Spain	9	24	18	4	8	10	1	23	
09	Sweden	2	3	1	2	3	2	10	2	10
10	Albania	16	20	20	23	18	24		16	
11	Italy	6	4	7	5	17	5	6	4	7
12	Estonia	13	11	21	22	7	14		18	
13	Finland	1	1	2	1	2	1	12	1	12
14	Czech Republic	21	5	19	8	5	7	4	14	
15	Australia	3	16	4	15	13	6	5	15	
16	Belgium	12	18	17	20	12	20		7	4
17	Armenia	20	13	22	14	20	23		25	
18	Moldova	4	7	12	3	1	3	8	12	
19	Ukraine	23	17	25	9	21	21		10	1
20	Norway									
21	Germany	25	6	6	10	14	11		17	
22	Lithuania	18	9	9	24	15	17		13	
23	Israel	8	12	5	12	10	8	3	8	3
24	Slovenia	14	23	13	11	23	19		22	
25	Croatia	24	25	24	13	24	25		11	
26	United Kingdom	17	19	10	25	25	22		21	
