= Bay (surname) =

Bay is a surname used in many countries around the world. The name has many variations and meanings.

- English, French, and Dutch: nickname for someone with chestnut or auburn hair, from Middle English, Old French bay, bai, Middle Dutch bay ‘reddish brown’ (Latin badius, used originally of horses).
- English: from the Middle English personal name Baye, Old English Beaga (masculine) or Beage (feminine).
- Scottish, Irish: from Old Gaelic O'Bae and with variations of McBay, MacBay and reduced form of McBeth.
- German: from the Germanic personal name Baio.
- Scandinavian: found in various regions of Scandinavian countries, coming from North Germanic influence.
- Turkic, Ottoman, and Central Asian: In Turkic and related languages, Bay (along with its phonetic variants Bey, Beg, Bek, Baig, or Beigh) historically originated as a title meaning "lord", "chief", or "wealthy landowner."
  - Turkey: In historical accounts, many Turkish, other Turkic and Persian leaders are titled Bey, Beg, Bek, Bay, Baig or Beigh. They are all the same word with the simple meaning of "lord". Currently "Bay" is Turkish for Mr., gentleman or wealthy. Before the adoption of the 1934 Surname Law in Turkey, which did not use Western-style surnames, instead the many in the Ottoman Empire carried titles such as Bay or Bey. An unsubstantiated oral tradition among some families in Europe using Bay as their surname dictates that a family member was given or awarded this surname, then as a title, during one of the crusades, when he was given governorship of a territory in Asia Minor, possibly as part of a crusader state. This title was then to have been brought back to Europe to be used as a surname after the Crusader states fell.
  - Central Asia: In Central Asian Turkic languages (including Kazakh, Kyrgyz, Uzbek, and Turkmen), Bay (frequently transliterated as Bai) historically denoted a wealthy clan leader or elite landholder. While it rarely stands alone as a modern surname in Central Asia due to late 19th and 20th-century Russification, it remains a highly prevalent root component in compound surnames and patronymics throughout the region. These commonly manifest with Slavic suffixes, such as Bayev (or Baiev), Bayov, and Baibekov, as well as compound names like Atabay or Ucbay.

The name is also found in Denmark, Sweden and Norway, where it may be a short form of German Bayer, regional name for someone from Bavaria, or from baygh, originally a loan word from French denoting a type of fabric. There are currently 50 people residing in Sweden with Bay as a surname, while 62 people are named Bayer.

== Notable people ==
- Alejo Bay (1891–1952), Mexican politician
- Alexandre Maître, Marquis de Bay (1650–1715), French military officer
- Béla Bay (1907–1999), Hungarian fencer
- Charles Ulrick Bay (1888–1955), American businessman and diplomat
- Christian Bay (1921–1990), Canadian academic
- Christophe Bay (born 1962), French politician
- Elihu H. Bay (1754–1838), American judge
- Elsie Bay (born 1996), Norwegian singer and songwriter
- Emanuel Bay (1891–1967), Russian-American classical pianist
- Frances Bay (1919–2011), American actress
- Francis Bay (1914–2005), Belgian composer
- Frederik Bay (born 1997), Danish footballer
- Gry Bay (born 1974), Danish actress
- Hanni Bay (1885–1978), Swiss painter and illustrator
- Harry Bay (1878–1952), American baseball player
- Herbert Bay, Swiss computer scientist
- Howard Bay (designer) (1912–1986), American set designer
- Jacquie Bay (born 2000), New Zealand science education researcher
- James Bay (singer) (born 1990), English singer-songwriter and guitarist
- Janie Bay, South African musician
- Jason Bay (born 1978), Canadian-American baseball player
- Jens Christian Bay (1871–1962), Danish-American writer and librarian
- Jeppe Bay (born 1997), Danish badminton player
- John Bay (1928–1982), American actor
- Jonathan Bay (born 1993), Argentine footballer
- Joseph Jan Baptiste de Bay (1779–1863), Flemish sculptor, museum conservator and art restorer
- Josephine Perfect Bay (1900–1962), American financier and businessperson
- Luz Bay, American politician
- Markus Bay (born 1997), Danish footballer
- Matthew Oakeshott, Baron Oakeshott of Seagrove Bay (born 1947), British politician
- Mel Bay (1913–1997), Musical artist
- Mia Bay, American historian
- Michael Bay (born 1965), American filmmaker
- Nicolas Bay (born 1977), French politician
- Norman Bay (born 1960), American attorney
- Patsha Bay, Congolese actor and singer
- Peter Bay (born 1957), American conductor
- Phee Bay (born 2005), Myanmar footballer
- Rick Bay (born 1940), American head coach and gridiron football player
- Ross Bay (born 1965), New Zealand bishop
- Rudolph Bay (1791–1856), Danish musician
- Stephen Parkinson, Baron Parkinson of Whitley Bay (born 1983), British Conservative politician and life peer
- Susan Bay (born 1943), American actress
- Tawfiq Bay, Syrian pan-Islamist who fought in Xinjiang, China
- Thomas Bay (conductor), Danish-Swedish musician, conductor, and theatrical performer
- Tina Bay (born 1973), Norwegian cross-country skier
- William Van Ness Bay (1818–1894), American judge
- Willow Bay (born 1963), American model and journalist
- Zoltán Lajos Bay (1900–1992), Hungarian physicist and engineer

== See also ==
- Bey
- Bey (disambiguation)
- Bay (disambiguation)
