= Baev =

Baev, Bayev or Bajev (Cyryllic: Баев) is a Slavic masculine surname, its feminine counterpart is Baeva, Bayeva or Bajeva. The surname may refer to the following notable people:

- Alena Baeva (born 1985), Russian violinist
- Aleksei Bayev (born 1993), Russian football player
- Bayu Baev (born 1941), Bulgarian wrestler
- David Baev (born 1997), Russian freestyle wrestler
- Denis Bayev (born 1983), Ukrainian hockey player
- Irina Baeva (born 1992), Russian television actress
- Kaloyan Baev (born 1972), Bulgarian wrestler
- Khassan Baiev (born 1963), Russian Chechen doctor and author
- Mariela Baeva (born 1964), Bulgarian writer, researcher and philologist
- Nako Baev (born 2003), Bulgarian visual artist
- Nikolaj Bajev (born 1974), Russian LGBT activist and journalist
- Nikolai Bayev (1875–1952), Armenian architect
- Pavel Baev (born 1957), Russian-Norwegian political scientist
- Theodoros Baev (born 1977), Bulgarian-born Greek volleyball player
- Vera Baeva (1930–2017), Bulgarian writer and composer

== See also ==
- Baeva livada, village in Bulgaria
