= McBey =

McBey is a Scottish surname. Notable people with the surname include:

- James McBey (1883–1959), Scottish artist and etcher
- Marguerite McBey (1905–1999), American painter and photographer

== See also ==
- McBay
