= Ole Goethe =

Norwegian animator and academic (born 1975)

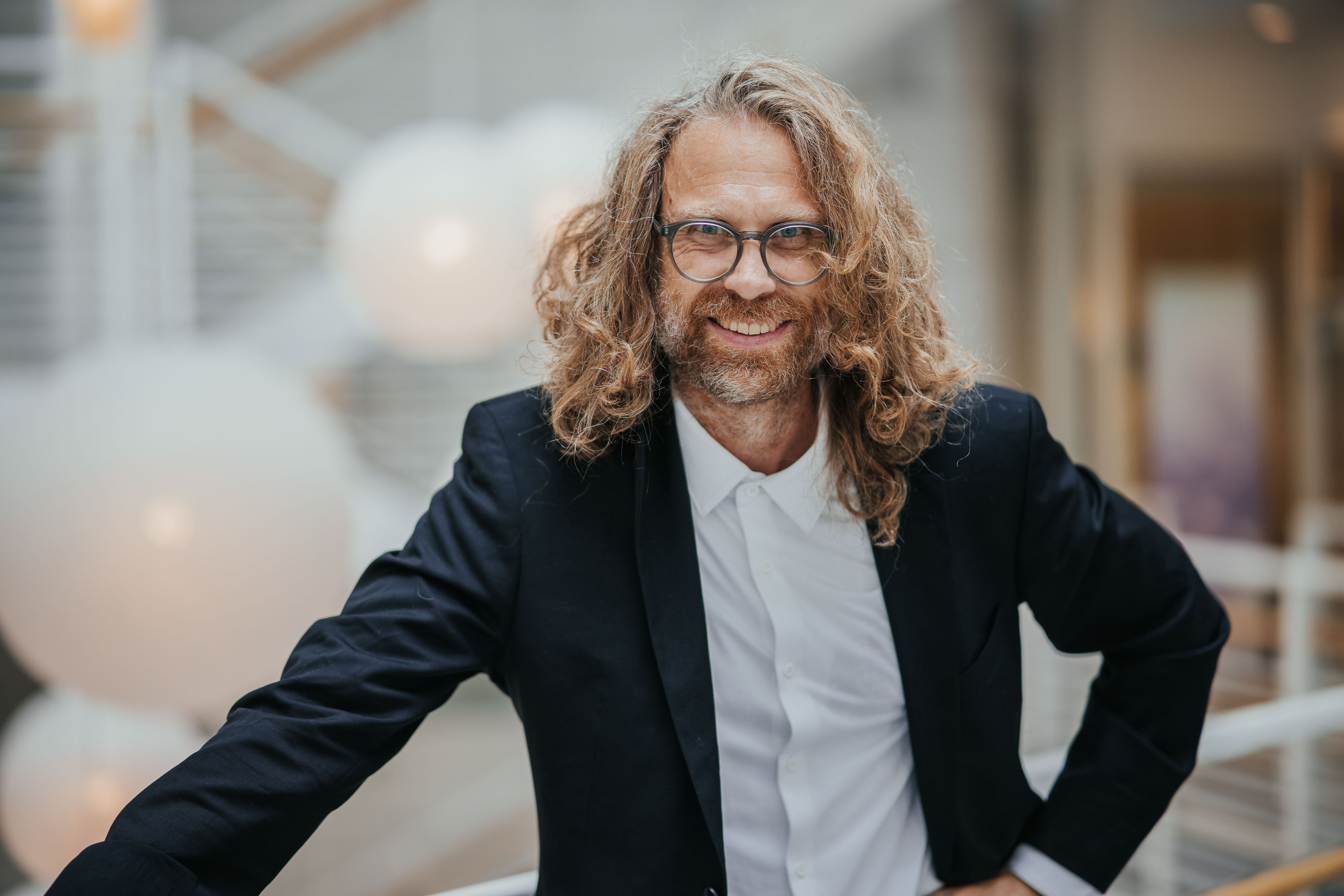
- Born: December 26, 1975 (age 50); Norway
- Education: University of Westminster, Academy of Art University
- Scientific career
- Workplaces: Kristiania University College, Nord University
- Website: University profile page

Ole Goethe (born 1975) is a Norwegian animator and academic. He is associate professor at Kristiania University College, specializing in game design and gamification.

Alongside his work in animation, Goethe has also worked in game development, graphic design, and digital product design. In the games industry, he served as art director for Bowling Buddies, a social game developed by Playfish.

== Early life and education ==
Ole Goethe is from Søgne Municipality near Kristiansand in the south of Norway. In the late 1980s, he became interested in personal computers and worked as a member in the demoscene group named Andromeda listed as olly or Oo. There he was an active Amiga pixel artist.

In 1999, he received his undergraduate degree in computer science from University of Westminster in London, United Kingdom, then moved to San Francisco to study at the Academy of Art University where he earned a B.A. (2004) in computer graphics and M.F.A. (2009) in directing faculty.

== Animation career ==
While living in San Francisco he worked on animation for movies and video games. In 2002 he took time off from his studies to work for the Norwegian company AnimagicNet (now Storm Studios) doing animation on the movie Free Jimmy, the world's first 3D animated movie for adults.

He later did animation on several games, including Star Wars Rogue Squadron III: Rebel Strike, Cold Fear, and Lair, and worked for game developers including Factor 5, Ubisoft and LucasArts. In 2014 he was animation director for the music video for Geirr Lystrup's song "Rød Pysjå".

After ten years abroad, he moved home to Norway in 2009 and started an animation company, Shade, that among other projects was involved in animating the TV2 (Norway) series Vennebyen.

== Academic career ==
In 2015, Goethe was Program Director for the Game Design Bachelor Program at the University of Inland Norway. From 2016 he joined Kristiania University College in Oslo as an associate professor. He is also an associate professor at Nord University in Bodø, in the field of educational games, and he is affiliated with the NTNU-based Centre for Excellence in Education "Excited", where he participates in the cluster on Pedagogy in IT Education.

His 2019 book Gamification Mindset explains what gamification is, discusses how gamification can be used in an educational setting as a learning system, and describes how to design a learning system that uses gamification.

In 2022 he published a textbook on animation for film, games and apps titled Animasjon gjort enkelt: for film, spill og apper. In 2024 his co-authored book Universal Design in Video Games: Active Participation Through Accessible Play (with Adam Palmquist and Izabella Jedel) was published.

He has spoken at a number of industry events, including Joingame, the CILECT congress, Universum Awards 2018, the Norwegian Game Awards, and Konsoll.

== Bibliography ==
- Gamification Mindset (2019, Author) Springer Nature
- Animation Made Easy (2023, Author) Fagbokforlaget
- Universal Design in Vide Games (2024, Co-author) Springer Nature
