= Adnan Kisa =

Norwegian academic in health policy and economics

- Education: Tulane University
- Known for: Health policy and economics research, Global Burden of Disease, health and economic development
- Scientific career
- Fields: Health policy, health economics, public health
- Workplaces: Kristiania University College; Tulane University

Adnan Kisa is an academic specializing in health policy, health economics, and public health. He is a professor of health policy and economics at Kristiania University College in Oslo, Norway, and Tulane University in New Orleans, United States.

== Education ==
Kisa received his PhD in Health Policy and Economics from the Tulane University School of Public Health and Tropical Medicine.

== Career ==
Kisa has held academic and administrative positions at Kristiania University of Applied Sciences and Tulane University. His research has focused on economic evaluation, global health policy, and health system performance. He has contributed to collaborative international studies, including the Global Burden of Disease initiative and projects conducted with the World Health Organization (WHO), such as the Innovative Care for Chronic Conditions and Adherence to Long-Term Therapies reports.

Kisa has also led research projects on public health communication, leadership in health crises, and health economics. His work has been cited in peer-reviewed journals addressing global health, policy analysis, and cost-effectiveness of healthcare interventions.

== Publications ==
Kisa has co-authored numerous articles and reports on topics related to health systems, global health policy, and public health communication. Selected works include:

- Kisa, Adnan; Kisa, Sezer (8 October 2025). "Structural racism as a fundamental cause of health inequities: a scoping review". International Journal for Equity in Health. 24 (1): 257. doi:10.1186/s12939-025-02644-7. PMC 12506018. PMID 41063084.
- Kisa, Adnan; Kisa, Sezer (3 April 2025). "Health conspiracy theories: a scoping review of drivers, impacts, and countermeasures". International Journal for Equity in Health. 24 (1): 93. doi:10.1186/s12939-025-02451-0. PMC 11969846. PMID 40181408.
- Mohamed Nour, Magde; Kisa, Adnan (7 March 2024). "Political Leaders' Communication Strategies during COVID-19 in Highly Infected Countries: A Scoping Review". Healthcare. 12 (6): 607. doi:10.3390/healthcare12060607. PMC 10970693. PMID 38540571.
- Adherence to Long-Term Therapies: Evidence for Action. World Health Organization. (2003).
- Innovative Care for Chronic Conditions: Building Blocks for Action. World Health Organization. (2002).

== Recognition ==
Kisa is included in Stanford University and Elsevier’s “World's Top 2% Most-Cited Scientists” list, which identifies researchers across all disciplines based on standardized citation metrics.
