= Melodi Grand Prix 2023 =

61st edition of Melodi Grand Prix

Dates and venues
- Semi-final 1: 14 January 2023
- Semi-final 2: 21 January 2023
- Semi-final 3: 28 January 2023; Screen Studios, Nydalen
- Final: 4 February 2023; Trondheim Spektrum, Trondheim

Organisation
- Broadcaster: Norsk rikskringkasting (NRK)
- Presenters: Arian Engebø; Stian Thorbjørnsen

Participants
- Number of entries: 21

Vote
- Winning song: "Queen of Kings" by Alessandra

Melodi Grand Prix 2023 was the 61st edition of Melodi Grand Prix (MGP), the annual Norwegian music competition that serves as the country's preselection for the Eurovision Song Contest. It was organised by Norway's public broadcaster NRK, and consisted of three semi-finals and a final, held throughout January and February 2023. The winner of the competition, Alessandra with "Queen of Kings", went on to represent Norway in the Eurovision Song Contest 2023 in Liverpool, United Kingdom in May 2023.

== Format ==
The contest consisted of three semi-finals at Screen Studios in Nydalen, and a final at Trondheim Spektrum. From 2020 to 2022, a number of artists were formerly pre-qualified for the final, but this was no longer the case in 2023. Moreover, there were no duels nor a "last chance" round, and voting began once all of the artists have performed. A total of 21 entries competed, with seven songs for each semi-final. The three performers who obtain the most votes qualified for the final. In addition, the international jury was re-introduced in the final, consisting of industry professionals from multiple countries. The jury and the public each contributed 50% to the final result.

According to Stig Karlsen, who is in charge of the organization of the event for NRK, the contest would "now [be] going for a competition model that is easier to understand, and where all the artists compete with the same starting point."

In October 2022, it was announced that the contest would be hosted by Arian Engebø and Stian Thorbjørnsen.

== Competing entries ==
About one month after the Eurovision Song Contest 2022, NRK officially opened submissions for songwriters to submit entries for Melodi Grand Prix 2023. The submission window closed on 18 September 2022.

The competition is open to all songwriters, and each songwriter can submit up to three songs. Each song should have at least one Norwegian contributor, in order to "prioritise and promote the Norwegian music scene". In addition to the open submission, NRK also looked for possible entries through targeted search and direct dialogue with the Norwegian music industry, and through songwriting camps held in August 2022.

In October 2022, it was announced that 21 entries were selected to take part in the contest. The competing artists were announced on 4 January, with the respective entries to be released on a weekly basis, starting from 9 January. Among the competing artists are Kate Gulbrandsen, Stig van Eijk, Jowst and Ulrikke Brandstorp, winners of Melodi Grand Prix in 1987, 1999, 2017 and 2020, respectively.

Competing entries
Artist	Song	Composer(s)
Akuvi	"Triumph"	Anderz Wrethov, Andreas Stone Johansson, Beatrice Akuvi Hosen Kumordzie, Konstantinos Vlastaras
Alejandro Fuentes	"Fuego"	Alejandro Fuentes, Chris Young, Mateo Camargo, Nermin Harambašić
Alessandra	"Queen of Kings"	Alessandra Mele, Henning Olerud, Linda Dale, Stanley Ferdinandez
Atle Pettersen	"Masterpiece"	Andreas Stone Johansson, Atle Pettersen, Hannah Dorothy Bristow
Bjørn Olav Edvardsen	"Turn Off My Heart"	Bjørn Olav Edvardsen, Christian Ingebrigtsen, Henrik Tala
Byron Williams Jr. and Jowst	"Freaky for the Weekend"	Byron Williams Jr., Joachim With Steen
Eirik Næss	"Wave"	Amalie Olsen, Eirik Næss, Viktor Ljungqvist
Eline Thorp	"Not Meant to Be"	Andreas Stone Johansson, Eline Thorp, Elsa Søllesvik, Jonas Holteberg Jensen
Ella	"Waist"	Isabell Røren Hannevig, Raphaela Antônia Souza Silva, Timothy John Adam Gosden, Tristan Henry
Elsie Bay	"Love You in a Dream"	Andreas Stone Johansson, Elsa Søllesvik, Tom Oehler
Jone	"Ekko inni meg"	Audun Guldbrandsen, Christine Ekeberg, Christopher Colin Archer, Jonas Nes Steinset, Morten Franck, Silje Blandkjenn
Kate Gulbrandsen	"Tårer i paradis"	Kate Gulbrandsen, Kjetil Mørland
Maria Celin	"Freya"	Anna Timgren, Benjamin Alasu, Eirik Fjeld, Gaute Ormåsen, Sindre Timberlid Jenssen
Rasmus Thall	"Tresko"	Farida Louise Bolseth Benounis, Rasmus Simon Vedvik Thallaug, Robin Alexander Vedvik Helmersen
Sandra Lyng	"Drøm d bort"	Erlend Torheim, Ferdinann West, Kristina Blakli, Sandra Lyng
Skrellex	"Love Again"	Jonas Gladnikoff, Kai Thomas Ryen Larsen, Michael James Down, Primož Poglajen, Will Taylor
Stig van Eijk	"Someday"	Beate Helen Thunes, Stig van Eijk
Swing'it	"Prohibition"	Jonah Charles Hitchens, Martin Jarl Velsin, Sam Peter Norris, Vebjørn Mamen
Tiril	"Break It"	Benjamin Pinkus, Emelie Hollow, Emma Steinbakken, Lars Rossnes
Ulrikke Brandstorp	"Honestly"	Ben Adams, Christoffer Gunnestad, Helge Moen, Jim Bergsted, Joshua Oliver, Ulrikke Brandstorp
Umami Tsunami	"Geronimo"	Bjørn Olav Edvardsen, Carl-Henrik Wahl, Kristian Lund, Lasse Nymann, Sindre Jenssen, Torgeir Ryssevik

== Semi-finals ==
=== Semi-final 1 ===
The first semi-final took place on 14 January 2023.

Semi-final 1: 14 January 2023
R/O	Artist	Song	Result
1	Alessandra	"Queen of Kings"	Qualified
2	Eirik Næss	"Wave"	—N/a
3	Rasmus Thall	"Tresko"	—N/a
4	Kate Gulbrandsen	"Tårer i paradis"	—N/a
5	Umami Tsunami	"Geronimo"	Qualified
6	Ulrikke Brandstorp	"Honestly"	Qualified
7	Byron Williams Jr. & Jowst	"Freaky for the Weekend"	—N/a

=== Semi-final 2 ===
The second semi-final took place on 21 January 2023.

Semi-final 2: 21 January 2023
R/O	Artist	Song	Result
1	Jone	"Ekko inni meg"	Qualified
2	Sandra Lyng	"Drøm d bort"	—N/a
3	Alejandro Fuentes	"Fuego"	—N/a
4	Swing'it	"Prohibition"	Qualified
5	Elsie Bay	"Love You in a Dream"	Qualified
6	Ella	"Waist"	—N/a
7	Bjørn Olav Edvardsen	"Turn Off My Heart"	—N/a

=== Semi-final 3 ===
The third semi-final took place on 28 January 2023.

Semi-final 3: 28 January 2023
R/O	Artist	Song	Result
1	Akuvi	"Triumph"	—N/a
2	Tiril	"Break It"	—N/a
3	Skrellex	"Love Again"	Qualified
4	Eline Thorp	"Not Meant to Be"	Qualified
5	Stig van Eijk	"Someday"	—N/a
6	Maria Celin	"Freya"	—N/a
7	Atle Pettersen	"Masterpiece"	Qualified

== Final ==
The final took place on 4 February 2023. The winner was selected by a 50/50 combination of public televoting and ten international juries. In addition to the competing entries, Subwoolfer, who represented Norway in the Eurovision Song Contest 2022, also performed as an interval act.

Final: 4 February 2023
R/O	Artist	Song	Jury	Televote	Total	Place
1	Jone	"Ekko inni meg"	40	30	70	5
2	Eline Thorp	"Not Meant to Be"	42	18	60	6
3	Skrellex	"Love Again"	14	40	54	7
4	Ulrikke Brandstorp	"Honestly"	60	78	138	2
5	Umami Tsunami	"Geronimo"	19	30	49	9
6	Atle Pettersen	"Masterpiece"	94	28	122	3
7	Swing'it	"Prohibition"	8	43	51	8
8	Elsie Bay	"Love You in a Dream"	49	34	83	4
9	Alessandra	"Queen of Kings"	104	129	233	1

Detailed International Jury Votes
R/O	Song	United Kingdom	Finland	Azerbaijan	Spain	Ukraine	Czech Republic	France	Iceland	Netherlands	Sweden
R/O	Song	United Kingdom	Finland	Azerbaijan	Spain	Ukraine	Czech Republic	France	Iceland	Netherlands	Sweden
1	"Ekko inni meg"	8	6		4	4		4		6	8
2	"Not Meant to Be"	1	1	6	6		12	2	8	4	2
3	"Love Again"	2		2				1	6	2	1
4	"Honestly"	4	8	1	10	6	8	8	1	8	6
5	"Geronimo"		10			1	4		4		
6	"Masterpiece"	10	4	12	8	10	10	6	12	12	10
7	"Prohibition"			4	1	2	1				
8	"Love You in a Dream"	6	2	8	2	8	6	10	2	1	4
9	"Queen of Kings"	12	12	10	12	12	2	12	10	10	12
International Jury Spokespersons
United Kingdom – Simon Proctor; Finland – Matti Myllyaho; Azerbaijan – Nigar Jamal; Spain – Luismi Palao; Ukraine – Oksana Skybinska; Czech Republic – Jan Bors; France – Alexandra Redde-Amiel; Iceland – Sigurður Þorri Gunnarsson; Netherlands – Lars Lourenco; Sweden – Natalie Carrion

International Jury Members
Country	Jury Members
Azerbaijan	Aysel Adigozalzada Mahammad; Diana Hajiyeva; Elnur Hüseynov; Nigar Jamal; Isa Melikov
Czech Republic	Jan Bors; Kristýna Coufalová; Stiliana Dimitrova; Antonín Hrabal; Kryštof Kodl
Finland	Elias Koskimies; Vilma Alina Lähteenmäki; Matti Myllyaho; Aija Puurtinen; Sofia Ruija
France	Sebastien Barké; Moë Bennani; Alexandra Bouchou; Alexandra Redde-Amiel; Frédéric Valencak
Iceland	Sigurður Þorri Gunnarsson; Vigdís Hafliðadóttir; Baldvin Snær Hlynsson; Helga Möller; Karl Olgeir Olgeirsson
Netherlands	Glen Faria; Sophie Hijlkema; Corné Klijn; Lars Lourenco; Hila Noorzai
Spain	Natalia Calderón; Estefanía García; Guille Mostaza; Dangelo Ortega; Luismi Palao
Sweden	Natasha Azarmi; Mathias Bridfelt; Natalie Carrion; Robert Sehlberg; Helene Wigren
Ukraine	Iryna Bubnova; Nienov Herman; Tetiana Semenova; Dmytro Shurov; Oksana Skybinska
United Kingdom	Ellie Dixon; Alex Mansuroglu; Simon Proctor; Ste Softley; Namrata Varia

== Ratings ==
Viewing figures by show
Show	Air date	Viewers (millions)	Share (%)	Ref.
Semi-final 1	14 January 2023	0.625	—N/a	
Semi-final 2	21 January 2023	0.638	—N/a	
Semi-final 3	28 January 2023	0.645	—N/a	
Final	4 February 2023	0.957	—N/a	

== See also ==
- Norway in the Eurovision Song Contest
- Eurovision Song Contest 2023
