= Skrellex =

Norwegian drag performer and singer

- Born: Kai Thomas Ryen Larsen; Moss, Norway
- Origin: Norway
- Education: The Bårdar Academy
- Occupations: Singer; Actor; Drag Performer
- Instrument: Vocals
- Years active: 2007–present

Kai Thomas Ryen Larsen, stage name Skrellex, is a Norwegian drag performer, actor and singer.

== Background ==
Skrellex is from Moss, Norway and lives in Oslo. He attended the Bårdar Academy and has a background in musicals and shows.

== Career ==
In 2007, he began working as a performer. He won Mr Gay Norway 2008, which allowed him to participate in the Mr Gay European final. In the same year, he also joined musical group Queentastic as a background dancer, and eventually became a member. In 2010, he began doing drag. In 2014, he portrayed "Ragna Rolfsen" in Hotel Cæsar.

Skrellex developed his stage name as an alias for DJ sets. He has made multiple televised appearances, including placing second in the talent show Grease, an appearance on All Together Now in 2019 and as a drag queen on the show Drags. He was a mentor on the show Drag Me Out. Skrellex also appeared on the NRK series "Gauteshow".

In 2023, Skrellex was announced as a participant of Melodi Grand Prix 2023 with the song "Love Again", and placed 7th. In the same year, a urinal was named after him with a plaque at the Melløs Stadion. He won the Radio Duel for Melodi Grand Prix 2026 and secured a place in the final. Skrellex participated with the song "Into The Wild" and placed in 7th with a total of 45 points.

== Discography ==
=== Singles ===
- "Be Proud" (2008)
- "Love Again" (2023)
- "Into The Wild" (2026)

== Filmography ==
=== TV ===
- "Grease" - 2007 - contestant
- "All Together Now" - 2019 - contestant
- "Drags" - 2022 - contestant
- "Drag Me Out" - 2022 - contestant
- "Melodi Grand Prix" - 2023 - contestant
- "Melodi Grand Prix" - 2026 - contestant

=== Film ===
- "Hotel Cæsar" - 2014 - Ragna Rolfsen
- "Gauteshow" - 2024 - as himself
