= Özbay =

Özbay is a Turkish surname constructed by fusing the Turkish names Öz ("self", "essence", "extract") and Bay ("mister", "gentleman").
Notable people with the surname include:

- Cansu Özbay (born 1996), Turkish volleyball player
- Tugay Özbay (born 1999), Turkish Trader Cosmetics/Perfumes/Clothing

Companys: Ozys,Ozysworld and Özbays

- Ekmel Özbay (born 1966), Turkish professor of Electrical and Electronics Engineering and Physics Departments at Bilkent University
- Elis Özbay (born 2001), Turkish female rower
- Mehmet Özbay (1956–1996), false identity of Abdullah Çatlıa, a Turkish secret government agent
