= Jone (singer) =

Norwegian singer

JONE
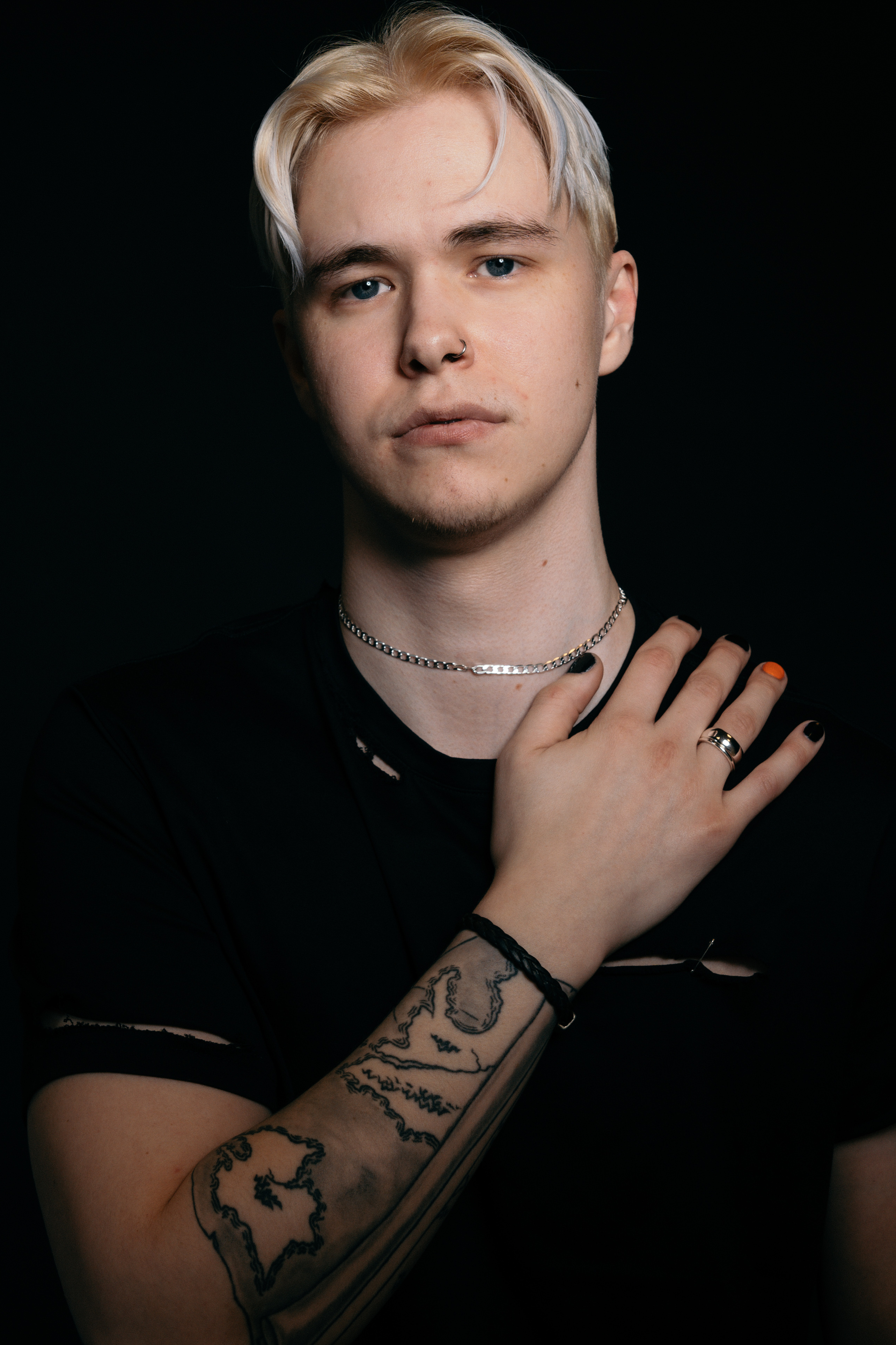
- Jone in 2022

Background information
- Born: 1995 (age 30–31)
- Origin: Lier, Norway
- Genres: Dance music
- Occupations: Singer, songwriter

Jonas Nes Steinset, known professionally as JONE (stylized in all-caps) is a Norwegian singer and songwriter best known for his Festmusikk (en: party music). He was nominated for a Spellemannprisen in the Festmusikk category in 2021. He participated in the Melodi Grand Prix 2023 with his song "Ekko inni meg", which placed fifth and reached #4 on the Norwegian national charts.

== Biography ==
Jone grew up in Lier, Norway. During high school, he became interested in music, and he subsequently attended the Kristiania University College for songwriting and production. He began creating festmusikk in 2020 and putting it out on streaming platforms.

In 2021, he was nominated for the Spellemannprisen in Festmusikk. In 2021, his song "Eventyr" was certified gold by IFPI Norge.

In 2023, he participated in the Melodi Grand Prix 2023 with his song "Ekko inni meg", which soon became the fourth-most-streamed song competing in any Eurovision national final that year. He described the song as a heartbreak song with both pop and folk music involved. During his recording of the song's music video, he took a planned fall and broke his rib, as the mattress put in place to catch him was insufficient.

He subsequently experienced pain from this break during his performances. He passed the semi-final round and went on to compete in the final round, driving to the location in a camper van. He performed first in the final, and placed fifth out of nine. His performance was rated positively by Eurovision analysts. The song spent eight weeks on the Norwegian charts, reaching #4. It was certified double platinum by IFPI Norge.

He is signed to record label Tylden & Co.
