= Show Window: The Queen's House =

2021–2022 South Korean television series

- Promotional poster
- Hangul: 쇼윈도: 여왕의 집
- RR: Syowindo: yeowangui jip
- MR: Syowindo: yŏwangŭi chip
- Genre: Melodrama; Mystery
- Created by: Channel A (planning); Wavve (production investment)
- Written by: Han Bo-kyung; Park Hye-young
- Directed by: Kang Sol; Park Dae-hee
- Starring: Song Yoon-ah; Lee Sung-jae; Jeon So-min; Hwang Chan-sung
- Music by: Kim Jong-cheon
- Country of origin: South Korea
- Original language: Korean
- No. of episodes: 16

Production
- Executive producers: Park Jong-eun; Kim Jong-beom (CP)
- Producers: Ko Dae-hwa; Kwon Ye-rim
- Editor: Kim Soo-yeon
- Running time: 60 minutes
- Production company: Kortop Media

Original release
- Network: Channel A
- Release: November 29, 2021 – January 18, 2022

Show Window: The Queen's House (Korean: 쇼윈도: 여왕의 집) is a South Korean television series starring Song Yoon-ah, Lee Sung-jae, Jeon So-min and Hwang Chan-sung. It aired on Channel A from November 29, 2021 to January 18, 2022, every Monday and Tuesday at 21:30 (KST) for 16 episodes.

The series was a commercial hit and became one of the highest-rated dramas in Korean cable television history. With an average nationwide viewership ratings of 10.335% for its final episode aired on January 18, 2022, it set a new record for the highest viewership ratings of any Channel A series.

== Synopsis ==
It is about a woman who supports the adultery of another woman, without knowing that the affair is with her husband.

== Cast ==
=== Main ===
- Song Yoon-ah as Han Sun-joo, Myung-seob's wife who has everything from beauty, to intelligence and wealth. Deciding to stay out of her family-controlled fashion house, she helps her husband with her excellent skills and raises their children with her meticulous personality.
- Lee Sung-jae as Shin Myung-seob, Sun-joo's husband who came from a humble background and turned his life around after marriage, but falls into a crisis due to an extramarital affair. He is the executive director of the family firm, reporting to his mother-in-law, Kim Kang-im.
- Jeon So-min as Yoon Mi-ra, a beautiful and charming woman who is faithful to her desires. She meets Myung-seob and falls in love with him. She is an art teacher at a primary school.
- Hwang Chan-sung as Han Jung-won, Sun-joo's younger brother who is optimistic and warm-hearted. He trusts and relies on his older sister more than anyone else. He is studying fashion in Milan while also working in the family firm.

=== Supporting ===
==== People around Sun-joo ====
- Kim Seung-soo as Cha Young-hoon, Sun-joo's ex-boyfriend and college classmate who is now a psychiatrist.
- Moon Hee-kyung as Kim Kang-im, Sun-joo and Jung-won's mother who is a demanding matriarch and chairperson of the family firm.
- Shin Yi-jun as Shin Tae-hee, Sun-joo and Myung-seob's daughter.
- Park Sang-hoon as Shin Tae-yong, Sun-joo and Myung-seob's son.

==== People in townhouse ====
- Kim Hye-in as Choi Eun-kyung
- Lee Sun-jin as Park Ye-rang
- Oh Seung-eun as Christina Jung
- Kim Young-jun as Ahn Do-hyuk
- Kim Jung-tae as Lee Joon-sang

==== Others ====
- Ga Young as Han Yeon-joo
- Kim Byeong-ok as Kang Dae-wook
- Jung Se-hyeong as Tango Master
- Jeong Jung-ah as Mrs. Jeong

=== Extended ===
- Moon Seo-yeon as Secretary Kang
- Park Jung-hak as Mi-ra's uncle

== Production ==
The first script reading of the cast was held in June 2021. Show Window: The Queen's House is labelled as "Channel A's Tenth Anniversary Special Project".

It was reported that the series finished filming on January 11, 2022.

== Original soundtrack ==
=== Part 1 ===
Released on October 12, 2021
No.	Title	Lyrics	Music	Artist	Length
1.	"Hello"	Hickee	Hickee; Kim Seung-ho; Kim Dong-kyun	Hickee	2:57
Total length:					2:57

=== Part 2 ===
Released on December 6, 2021
No.	Title	Lyrics	Music	Artist	Length
1.	"Fallin'"	Han Hye-jin (FAB); Piri Boi (FAB); Haru; +1	Piri Boi (FAB); Han Hye-jin (FAB); Haru; +1	Haru	3:45
Total length:					3:45

=== Part 3 ===
Released on December 13, 2021
No.	Title	Lyrics	Music	Artist	Length
1.	"Heaven Made"	Elsa Søllesvik; Lasse Midtsian Nymann	Elsa Søllesvik; Lasse Midtsian Nymann; Nylan	Elsie Bay	3:15
Total length:					3:15

=== Part 4 ===
Released on December 21, 2021
No.	Title	Lyrics	Music	Artist	Length
1.	"Cry Me a River"	OneTop; Zeenan	OneTop; Zeenan	Ha Dong-gyun	3:30
Total length:					3:30

=== Part 5 ===
Released on December 28, 2021
No.	Title	Lyrics	Music	Artist	Length
1.	"Just Myself" (나만)	Kim Mi-kyung; Lee So-won	Kim Mi-kyung; Lee So-won	Kim Hee-dong	3:42
Total length:					3:42

== Viewership ==
Show Window: The Queen's House : South Korea viewers per episode (millions)

Season	Episode number																Average
Season	1	2	3	4	5	6	7	8	9	10	11	12	13	14	15	16	Average
1	N/A	N/A	N/A	0.703	1.075	1.220	1.082	1.271	1.175	1.214	1.394	1.723	1.533	1.684	1.694	2.195	1.060

Source: Audience measurement performed nationwide by Nielsen Korea. (Note: This average audience measurement is calculated based on the published figures, the exact average audience measurement is unknown due to multiple audience measurement not published.)

Average TV viewership ratings
Ep.	Original broadcast date	Average audience share (Nielsen Korea)	
Ep.	Original broadcast date	Nationwide	Seoul
1	November 29, 2021	2.049% (17th)	N/A
2	November 30, 2021	1.752% (27th)	N/A
3	December 6, 2021	3.039% (13th)	N/A
4	December 7, 2021	3.715% (5th)	3.485% (5th)
5	December 13, 2021	5.500% (3rd)	5.614% (2nd)
6	December 14, 2021	5.922% (1st)	6.045% (1st)
7	December 20, 2021	5.523% (2nd)	5.801% (2nd)
8	December 21, 2021	6.406% (1st)	6.467% (1st)
9	December 27, 2021	5.701% (2nd)	5.976% (2nd)
10	December 28, 2021	5.860% (1st)	5.860% (1st)
11	January 3, 2022	6.997% (2nd)	7.164% (2nd)
12	January 4, 2022	8.092% (1st)	7.958% (1st)
13	January 10, 2022	7.575% (2nd)	6.896% (2nd)
14	January 11, 2022	8.366% (1st)	7.874% (1st)
15	January 17, 2022	8.523% (1st)	7.794% (2nd)
16	January 18, 2022	10.335% (1st)	9.646% (1st)
Average		5.960%	5.411% (Note: This average rating is calculated based on the published ratings. The exact average ratings is unknown due to multiple unpublished ratings.)
In the table above, the blue numbers represent the lowest ratings and the red numbers represent the highest ratings.; N/A denotes ratings that were not released.; This series aired on a cable channel/pay TV which normally has a relatively smaller audience compared to free-to-air TV/public broadcasters (KBS, SBS, MBC and EBS).

== Accolades ==
Award ceremony	Year	Category	Nominee	Result	Ref.
Korea Drama Awards	2022	Excellence Award, Actress	Jeon So-min	Won	
