= Elsie Bay =

Norwegian singer and songwriter (born 1996)

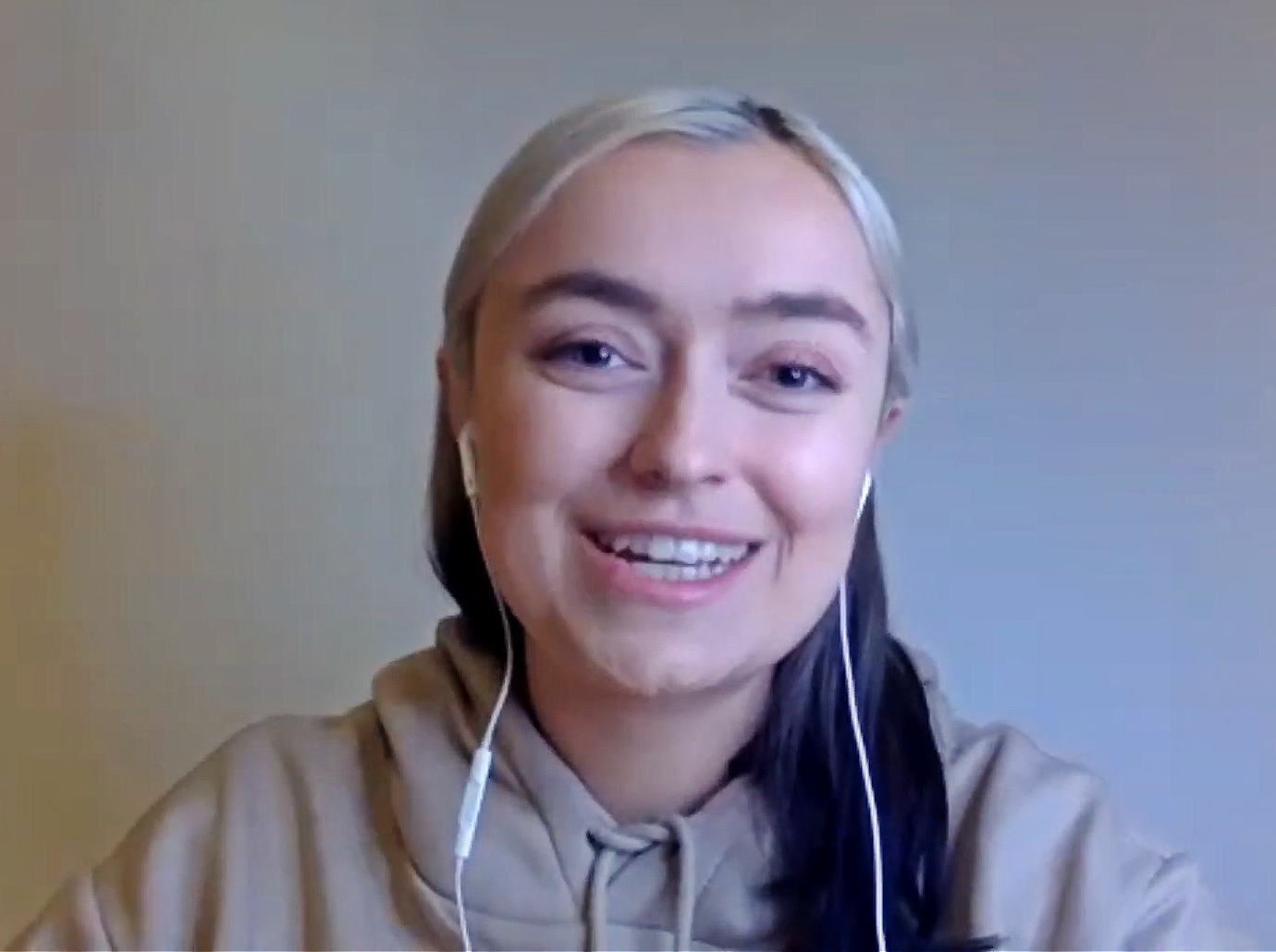
- Søllesvik in 2023

Background information
- Also known as: Elsa
- Born: Elsa Søllesvik; 22 April 1996 (age 30); Haugesund, Norway
- Genres: Pop
- Occupations: Singer; songwriter
- Years active: 2010–present

Elsa Søllesvik (born 22 April 1996), known professionally as Elsie Bay, is a Norwegian singer and songwriter.

== Early life ==
Søllesvik grew up in Sunde before moving to Haugesund at the age of 13. She found her interest in music as a child. She now lives in Berlin, Germany.

== Career ==
=== 2010–2018: Elsa & Emilie ===
In 2010, Søllesvik met Emilie Haaland Austrheim and formed a duo Elsa & Emilie. In 2014, the duo signed a contract with record label Sony Music and released their debut album Endless Optimism the same year. The duo was nominated for Best New Artist at the 2014 Spellemannprisen, annual Norwegian music award. "Run", a track from the album, gained popularity after being featured in the first season of the television series Skam in 2017.

In 2017, they released their sophomore album, Kill Your Darlings with singles "Au volant" and "Chains and Promises". In 2018, the duo announced their split to focus on Søllesvik's solo career.

=== 2018–present: Solo career and Melodi Grand Prix ===
After the split of Elsa & Emilie, Søllesvik moved to Oslo to establish herself as a songwriter for other artists. She co-wrote the track "Witch Woods", performed by Emmy, which competed at the Melodi Grand Prix 2021, where it made the final. She performed the opening theme of the third part of Korean television series Show Window: The Queen's House, titled "Heaven Made".

On 10 January 2022, she was announced as one of the competing acts of Melodi Grand Prix 2022 with the song "Death of Us", co-written with Jonas Holteberg Jensen and Andreas Stone Johansson. She finished as one of the top four finalists. Apart from her own entry, she also co-wrote "Hammer of Thor", performed by Oda Gondrosen, which qualified to the final.

She returned to the competition a year later with the song "Love You in a Dream" with Andreas Stone Johansson and Tom Oehler, qualifying for the final and placing fourth. She also co-wrote Eline Thorp's entry titled "Not Meant to Be", which also qualified for the final, placing sixth.

== Discography ==
=== Singles ===
| Title | Year | Peak chart positions | Album or EP |
| Title | Year | NOR Air. | Album or EP |
|---|---|---|---|
| "Death of Us" | 2022 | 28 | Non-album singles |
| "Tall People" | 2022 | — | Non-album singles |
| "Love You in a Dream" | 2023 | 17 | Non-album singles |
| "Bikini Song" | 2023 | — | Non-album singles |
"—" denotes a recording that did not chart or was not released in that territory.

=== Other appearances ===
| Title | Year | Album or EP |
|---|---|---|
| "Heaven Made" | 2021 | Show Window: The Queen's House Part.3 |
| "The Gleaming" | 2023 | Global Launch Commemorative Song for Reverse: 1999 |

== Songwriting discography ==
| Title | Year | Artist | Album | Co-written with |
|---|---|---|---|---|
| "Into You" | 2023 | Cyan Kicks | I Never Said 4ever | Niila Perkkiö, Susanna Alexandra |
| "Not Okay" | 2023 | Remo Forrer | Non-album single | Argyle Singh, Benjamin Alasu |

=== Eurovision Song Contest entries ===
| Country | Year | Artist | Title | Co-written with | Result |
|---|---|---|---|---|---|
| Cyprus | 2025 | Theo Evan | "Shh" | Dimitris Kontopoulos, Lasse Nymann, Linda Dale | Did not qualify (11th in semi-final 1) |

==== Pre-selection entries ====
===== Melodi Grand Prix entries (Norway) =====
| Year | Artist | Title | Co-written with | Result |
|---|---|---|---|---|
| 2021 | Emmy | "Witch Woods" | Olli Äkräs, Morten Franck | Final |
| 2022 | Elsie Bay | "Death of Us" | Jonas Holteberg Jensen, Andreas Stone Johansson | Top 4 |
| 2022 | Oda Gondrosen | "Hammer of Thor" | Morten Franck, Torgeir Ryssevik, Oda Kristine Gondrosen | Final |
| 2023 | Elsie Bay | "Love You in a Dream" | Andreas Stone Johansson, Tom Oehler | 4th |
| 2023 | Eline Thorp | "Not Meant to Be" | Andreas Stone Johansson, Eline Thorp, Jonas Holteberg Jensen | 6th |

===== German national final entries =====
| Year | Artist | Title | Co-written with | Result |
|---|---|---|---|---|
| 2023 | Trong | "Dare to Be Different" | Sasha Rangas, Stefan van Leijsen, Trong Hieu Nguyen | 4th |
| 2024 | Leona | "Undream You" | Leona Preuss, Maria Christensen, Simon Davis | 9th |

===== Luxembourg Song Contest entries (Luxembourg) =====
| Year | Artist | Title | Co-written with | Result |
|---|---|---|---|---|
| 2024 | Krick | "Drowning in the Rain" | Andreas Stone Johansson, Tom Oehler | 2nd |

===== Moldovan national final entries =====
| Year | Artist | Title | Co-written with | Result |
|---|---|---|---|---|
| 2026 | Dayana | "Doina" | Diana Sturza, Lasse Nymann, Linda Dale | 4th |
