= Queen of Kings (song) =

2023 single by Alessandra

Single by Alessandra

from the EP Best Year of My Life
- Language: English, Italian
- Released: 9 January 2023
- Length: 2:40
- Label: Starlab Music
- Songwriters: Henning Olerud; Stanley Ferdinandez; Alessandra Mele; Linda Dale

Alessandra singles chronology
"Queen of Kings" (2023)	"Pretty Devil" (2023)

Music video
- "Queen of Kings" on YouTube

Eurovision Song Contest 2023 entry
- Country: Norway
- Artist: Alessandra
- Language: English
- Composers: Henning Olerud; Stanley Ferdinandez; Alessandra Mele; Linda Dale
- Lyricists: Henning Olerud; Stanley Ferdinandez; Alessandra Mele; Linda Dale

Finals performance
- Semi-final result: 6th
- Semi-final points: 102
- Final result: 5th
- Final points: 268

Entry chronology
- ◄ "Give That Wolf a Banana" (2022)
- "Ulveham" (2024) ►

Official performance video
- "Queen of Kings" (First Semi-Final) on YouTube "Queen of Kings" (Grand Final) on YouTube

"Queen of Kings" is the debut single by Norwegian-Italian singer Alessandra Mele. It was written by Mele alongside three other songwriters and was released on 9 January 2023 through Starlab Music. The song represented Norway in the Eurovision Song Contest 2023, where it finished in fifth at the final with 268 points.

The song has been described as a song advocating for female empowerment and perseverance. It is inspired by Norwegian culture, Alessandra's Italian heritage, and her experiences of bisexuality. "Queen of Kings" was well received by critics, drawing consistent praise for its musical composition and Alessandra's vocal abilities. The song drew commercial success, peaking at number one in its native country of Norway, within the top five in four European countries, and within the top ten in a further seven countries.

== Background and composition ==
"Queen of Kings" was written by Henning Olerud, Stanley Ferdinandez, Linda Dale, and Alessandra Mele at a specialized songwriting camp for the Melodi Grand Prix, the annual competition that the Norwegian Broadcasting Corporation (NRK) uses to select its entry for the Eurovision Song Contest. The song was inspired by a piano melody played by her producer, with Alessandra stating that she imagined "a goddess running in the darkness through the woods, through the trees in a winter storm. She's a strong woman, coming out of a bad period". The song is also inspired by Alessandra's Italian heritage combined with her experiences living in Norway, with Alessandra wanting to combine Norwegian culture and the "power" of Italian mannerisms of speaking to make the song portray a "powerful woman".

"Queen of Kings" is described as a song advocating for female empowerment that is inspired by Alessandra's experiences with being bisexual in Italy. To Alessandra, it also advocated for perseverance through hard times, stating that "the song represents me as an artist but also as a person. I am not perfect and I have been through a lot but I am also proud of the bad things that happened to me because it helped shape who I am." The song also uses the symbolism of a queen, which to Alessandra represented that "she will rise up because of all the shit that she has been going through... because you felt it, you're going to grow out of it." References to Norwegian folklore are also made within the song, with Wiwibloggs writer Oliver Adams stating that the rhythms used within the song "emulate those used in sea shanties and traditional Norwegian folk songs".

== Music video and promotion ==
Along with the song's release, an accompanying music video directed by Alexander Zarare Frez was released on 24 March 2023. To further promote the song, Alessandra announced her intent to perform at various Eurovision pre-parties before the contest during the months of March and April, including Melfest WKND on 11 March, PreParty ES on 9 April, Eurovision in Concert on 15 April, and the London Eurovision Party on 16 April. Alessandra also released various versions and remixes of the song before and after Eurovision, including an acoustic version on 13 April 2023, an Italian version on 21 April, and a remix featuring Italian DJ Gabry Ponte on 1 June.

== Critical reception ==
"Queen of Kings" has received generally positive reception. In a Wiwibloggs review containing several reviews from several critics, the song was rated 8.06 out of 10 points, earning fifth out of 37 songs on the site's annual ranking. Another review conducted by ESC Bubble that contained reviews from a combination of readers and juries rated the song second out of the 15 songs in the Eurovision semi-final "Queen of Kings" was in. Vulture's Jon O'Brien ranked the song tenth overall, describing the song as "an unashamedly OTT female-fronted dance-pop anthem" but also stating that "it may get lost alongside the other Scandi big hitters at [Eurovision]." ESC Beat's Doron Lahav ranked the song 14th overall, writing that it was "catchy and contemporary."

BBC News' music correspondent Mark Savage described the song as "an electric jolt of Euro-pop, with a baroque chorus most artists would kill for", praising Alessandra's vocal abilities. i's Anna Bonet ranked it third out of the 26 finalists in Eurovision 2023, writing that "if Game of Thrones were to do a musical, this is what it would look like... she could be a dark horse." The Times' Ed Potten ranked it 13th out of the 26 finalists, rating the song three out of five stars. National Public Radio's Glen Weldon ranked the song ninth in his top ten for Eurovision 2023, praising the song's imagery and Alessandra's ability to sing whistle notes. The Guardian's Ben Beaumont–Thomas included the song in his "14 songs to listen out for at Eurovision 2023" list, writing that the song was a "folkloric be-robed anthem... The grog-chugging heartiness of a sea shanty done with the drum programming of an Ibizan tech-house producer, Queen of Kings will whip up a storm in the arena."

== Eurovision Song Contest ==
=== Melodi Grand Prix 2023 ===
Norway's national broadcaster, the Norwegian Broadcasting Corporation (NRK), organised a 21-entry competition, Melodi Grand Prix 2023, to select its entrant for the 67th iteration of the Eurovision Song Contest. The competition was divided into three seven song semi-finals that took place on the 14th, 21st, and 28 January 2023. The top three in each semi-final qualified for a nine-song grand final on 4 February 2023, with the winner of the grand final being selected through a 50/50 vote of juries and public televoting.

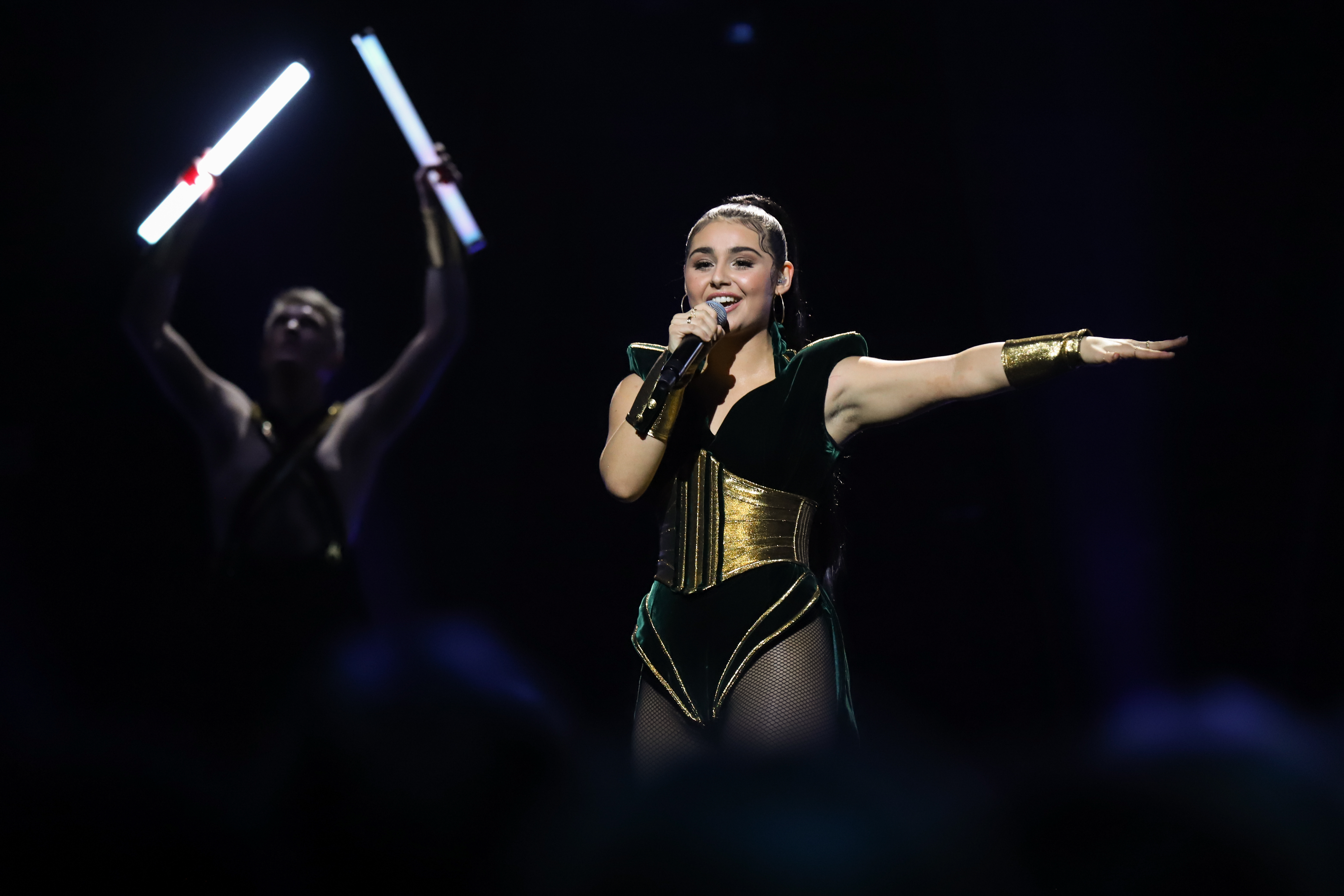
Alessandra performing "Queen of Kings" at the first semi-final of Melodi Grand Prix 2023.

"Queen of Kings" was randomly drawn to compete the first semi-final, performing in first. The song was able to qualify into the grand final, where it subsequently was chosen to perform as the ninth and last song in the grand final running order. In the grand final, Alessandra received the highest number of points from both the juries and televote, earning 104 and 129 points in each respective category for a total of 233 points; 95 more than the runner-up, Ulrikke Brandstorp's "Honestly". Responding to her victory in Aftenposten, she proclaimed that the victory was for "the queer environment".

=== At Eurovision ===
The Eurovision Song Contest 2023 took place at the Liverpool Arena in Liverpool, United Kingdom, and consisted of two semi-finals held on the respective dates of 9 and 11 May, and the final on 13 May 2023. During the allocation draw on 31 January 2023, Norway was drawn to compete in the first semi-final, performing in the first half of the show. She was later selected by the show's producers to perform first in the semi-final, ahead of Malta's The Busker.

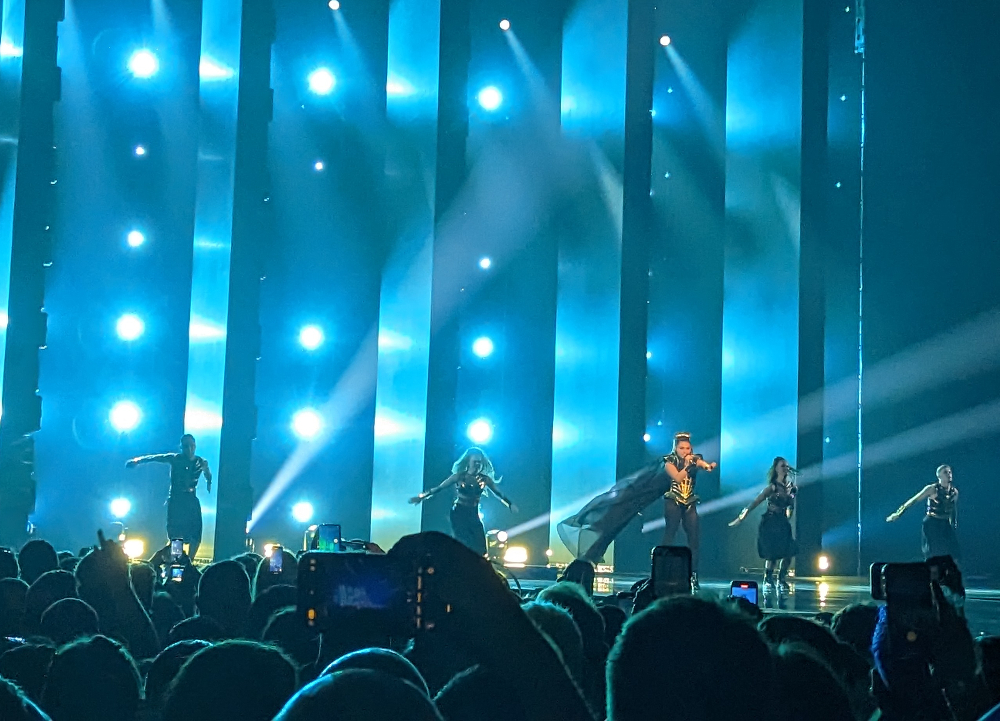
Alessandra performing "Queen of Kings" at a dress rehearsal leading into the first Eurovision 2023 semi-final.

For the Eurovision performance of "Queen of Kings", Alessandra was accompanied by four backing dancers carrying glowing sticks. Alessandra wore an outfit designed by Susanne Hoftun and Katarzyna Blonska, featuring a dark green top, black fishnet pants, and a gold necklace and bracelet. According to Alessandra, the outfit was inspired by a combination of modern fashion styles and the fashion of Elizabeth I, stating that "it's like a modernised her: royal, but still you have the warrior taste of it". The performance is similar to its Melodi Grand Prix performance; like in MGP, it starts off with a focus shot of Alessandra's face, which is meant to show "the powerful face of the Queen that is not perfect". The performance features purple and blue lighting, with glowing sticks appearing during the song's second chorus. The performance ends with orange lighting as Alessandra walks onto an auxiliary stage.

Alessandra performed a repeat of her performance in the grand final on 13 May. The song was performed 20th in the final, after Ukraine's Tvorchi and before Germany's Lord of the Lost. After the results were announced, she finished in 5th with 268 points, with a split result of 52 points from the juries and 216 points from televoting. Regarding the former, the song received no sets of the maximum 12 points; the highest amount given was two sets of 10 points from Denmark and Israel. In the televote, "Queen of Kings" received one set of 12 points from Finland.

== Track listing ==
Digital download/streaming

1. "Queen of Kings" – 2:28

Digital download/streaming – Da Tweekaz x Tungevaag remix

1. "Queen of Kings (Da Tweekaz x Tungevaag Remix)" – 2:25

Digital download/streaming – Acoustic version

1. "Queen of Kings (Acoustic)" – 2:50

Digital download/streaming – Italian version

1. "Queen of Kings (Italian Version)" – 2:42

Digital download/streaming – Billen Ted remix

1. "Queen of Kings (Billen Ted Remix)" – 3:26

Digital download/streaming – Gabry Ponte remix

1. "Queen of Kings (Gabry Ponte Remix)" – 3:00

== Charts ==
=== Weekly charts ===
Weekly chart performance for "Queen of Kings"
Chart (2023)	Peak position
Australia Digital Tracks (ARIA)	21
Austria (Ö3 Austria Top 40)	8
Belgium (Ultratop 50 Flanders)	13
Croatia (Billboard)	12
Czech Republic Airplay (ČNS IFPI)	22
Czech Republic Singles Digital (ČNS IFPI)	20
Finland (Suomen virallinen lista)	3
France (SNEP)	152
Germany (GfK)	19
Global 200 (Billboard)	58
Greece International (IFPI)	4
Hungary (Single Top 40)	6
Iceland (Tónlistinn)	4
Ireland (IRMA)	18
Italy (FIMI)	33
Latvia (LaIPA)	7
Lithuania (AGATA)	7
Luxembourg (Billboard)	16
Netherlands (Single Top 100)	12
New Zealand Hot Singles (RMNZ)	29
Norway (VG-lista)	1
Poland (Polish Airplay Top 100)	20
Poland (Polish Streaming Top 100)	8
Portugal (AFP)	70
Slovakia Singles Digital (ČNS IFPI)	65
Spain (PROMUSICAE)	59
Sweden (Sverigetopplistan)	7
Switzerland (Schweizer Hitparade)	5
UK Singles (Official Charts)	10

=== Year-end charts ===
Year-end chart performance for "Queen of Kings"
Chart (2023)	Position
Iceland (Tónlistinn)	27
Poland (Polish Airplay Top 100)	87
Poland (Polish Streaming Top 100)	73
Sweden (Sverigetopplistan)	47

== Certifications ==
Certifications for "Queen of Kings"
Region	Certification	Certified units/sales
Belgium (BRMA)	Gold	20,000^{‡}
Denmark (IFPI Danmark)	Gold	45,000^{‡}
France (SNEP)	Gold	100,000^{‡}
Italy (FIMI)	Gold	50,000^{‡}
Norway (IFPI Norway)	Platinum	60,000^{‡}
Poland (ZPAV)	3× Platinum	150,000^{‡}
Spain (Promusicae)	Gold	30,000^{‡}
Switzerland (IFPI Switzerland)	Platinum	20,000^{‡}
United Kingdom (BPI)	Silver	200,000^{‡}
Streaming
Sweden (GLF)	Platinum	12,000,000^{†}
^{‡} Sales+streaming figures based on certification alone.^{†} Streaming-only figures based on certification alone.

== Release history ==
Release history and formats for "Queen of Kings"
Country	Date	Format(s)	Version	Label	Ref.
Various	7 January 2023	Digital download; streaming	EP track	Starlab Music	
Various	6 April 2023	Digital download; streaming	Da Tweekaz x Tungevaag remix	Starlab Music	
Various	13 April 2023	Digital download; streaming	Acoustic version	Starlab Music	
Various	21 April 2023	Digital download; streaming	Italian version	Starlab Music	
Various	19 May 2023	Digital download; streaming	Billen Ted remix	Starlab Music	
Various	1 June 2023	Digital download; streaming	Gabry Ponte remix	Starlab Music	
