= Marguerite McBey =

American painter and photographer

Marguerite Huntsberry Loeb McBey (April 30, 1905 – October 21, 1999) was an American painter and photographer.

Born in Philadelphia, she was educated in Switzerland and at the Sorbonne in Paris. She later studied bookbinding at the Ecole et Ateliers d'Art Decoratif in Paris, and during this period she had an affair with artist Oscar Kokoschka. After returning from Paris, she worked as a photographer in New York City and opened a bookbinding business.

In 1931, she married Scottish artist James McBey; during their marriage, the couple divided their time between London, New York and Morocco. Following her husband's death in 1959, McBey began a new career as a watercolor artist, and she enjoyed successful exhibitions of her work in London.
