= Sandra Lyng =

Norwegian singer (born 1987)

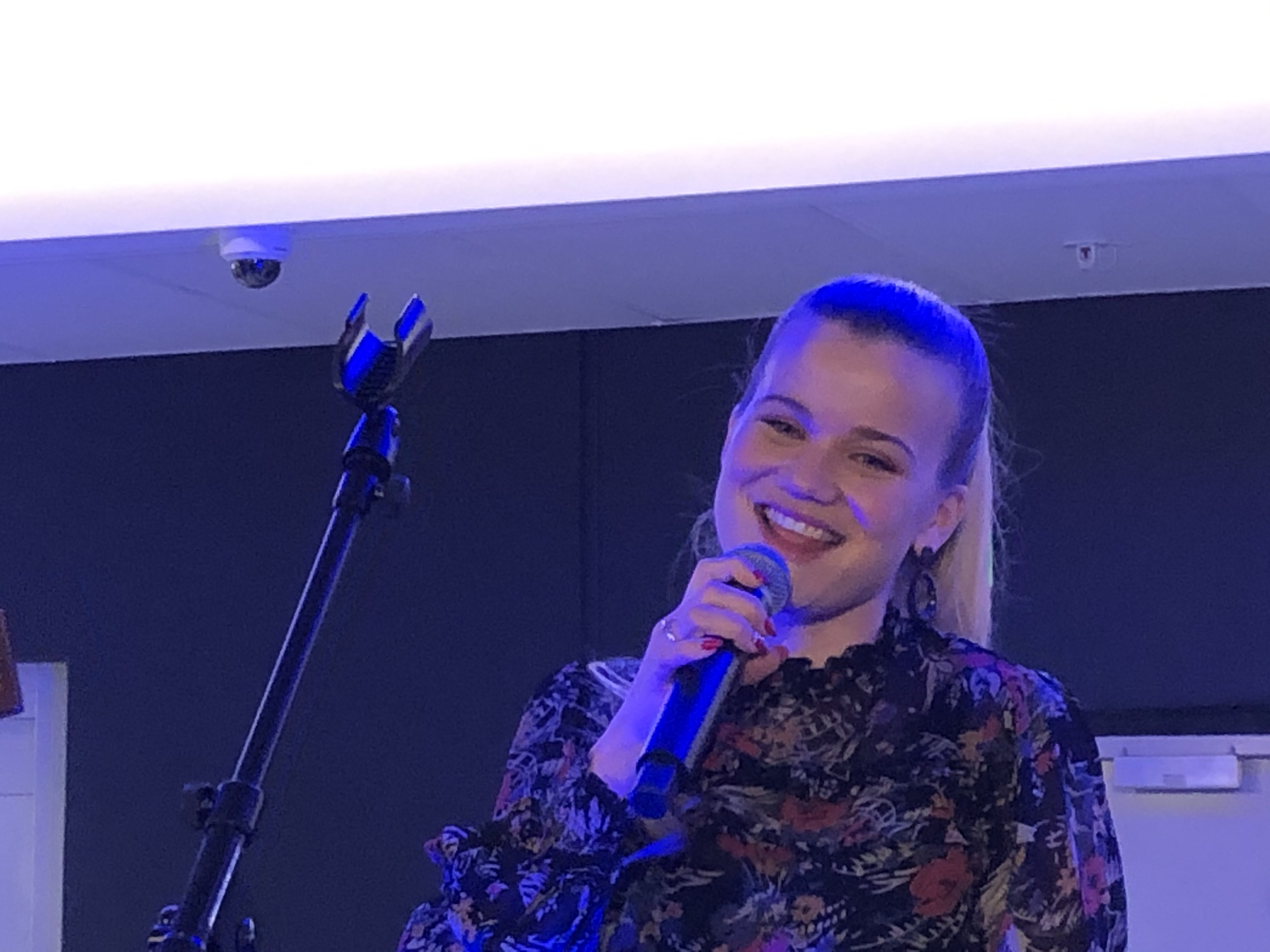
- Lyng in 2019

Background information
- Born: Sandra Lyng Haugen; 18 April 1987 (age 39); Mosjøen, Norway
- Genres: Pop, dance
- Occupation: Singer
- Instrument: Vocals
- Years active: 2004–present

Sandra Lyng Haugen (born 18 April 1987) is a Norwegian singer.

== Biography ==
Sandra Lyng Haugen is from the town of Mosjøen in Vefsn Municipality. She rose to popularity in 2004 after her participation in the Norwegian TV2 program Idol: Jakten på en superstjerne, the Norwegian version of Pop Idol, in which she placed fourth.

Sandra released her debut single the summer hit "Sommerflørt" in 2004, singing with Equicez member Phillip. In 2005, she released the single "I morgen", which stayed in the Norwegian charts for 16 weeks, peaking at number 2. Sandra also released the album Døgnvill under the Universal Norway label in 2005. Døgnvill stayed in the charts for 9 weeks, peaking at No. 10, which is a longer period of time than Kjartan Salvesen, who won Sandra's season, charted. In September 2013, Sandra released single "PRTeY" featuring rapper Lazee.

In January 2023, it was announced that she would participate in Melodi Grand Prix 2023 with the song "Drøm D Bort". She was eliminated in the second semi-final.

== Idol performances ==
- Auditions: "Foolish Games" (Jewel) / "Think Twice" (Celine Dion)
- Semi-finals: "My Immortal" (Evanescence)
- Top 11: "Panic" (Venke Knutson)
- Top 9: "Mysteriet Deg" (Lisa Nilsson)
- Top 8: "We Are Family" (Sister Sledge)
- Top 7: "(I Just) Died in Your Arms" (Cutting Crew)
- Top 6: "Love Don't Cost a Thing" (Jennifer Lopez)
- Top 5: "Love"
- Top 4: "Can't Fight the Moonlight" (LeAnn Rimes)/"(Everything I Do) I Do It for You" (Bryan Adams)

== Discography ==
=== Albums ===
Year	Album
2005	Døgnvill
2019	Julefantasi

Other collective albums

- 2004: Idol: De Elleve Finalistene

=== Singles ===
Title	Year	Peak chart positions			Certifications	Album
Title	Year	NOR	FRA	POL	Certifications	Album
"Sommerflørt" (with Philip)	2004	—	—	—		Skulk med stil
"I morgen" (featuring Whimsical & Kleen Cut)	2005	—	—	—		Døgnvill
"Hjemsøkt"	2009	—	—	—		Non-album singles
"PRTeY"	2013	—	—	—		Non-album singles
"Don't Care"	2014	—	—	—	IFPI NOR: Gold	Non-album singles
"Play My Drum"	2015	2	70	8	IFPI NOR: 2x Platinum; ZPAV: Gold	Non-album singles
"Night After Night"	2015	9	—	—	IFPI NOR: 2x Platinum	Non-album singles
"Moonrise"	2016	18	—	—	IFPI NOR: Platinum	Non-album singles
"Blue"	2016	—	—	—		Non-album singles
"LiQR"	2016	—	—	—		Non-album singles
"Bungalow" (featuring Temur)	2017	—	—	—		Non-album singles
"Har du plass?" (with Halva Priset)	2022	37	—	—		Non-album singles
"Drøm d bort"	2023	—	—	—		Non-album singles
"Raggarnissen" (with Staysman and Hagle)	2024	15	—	—		Non-album singles
"—" denotes single that did not chart or was not released.
