= Vera Baeva =

Bulgarian composer and writer

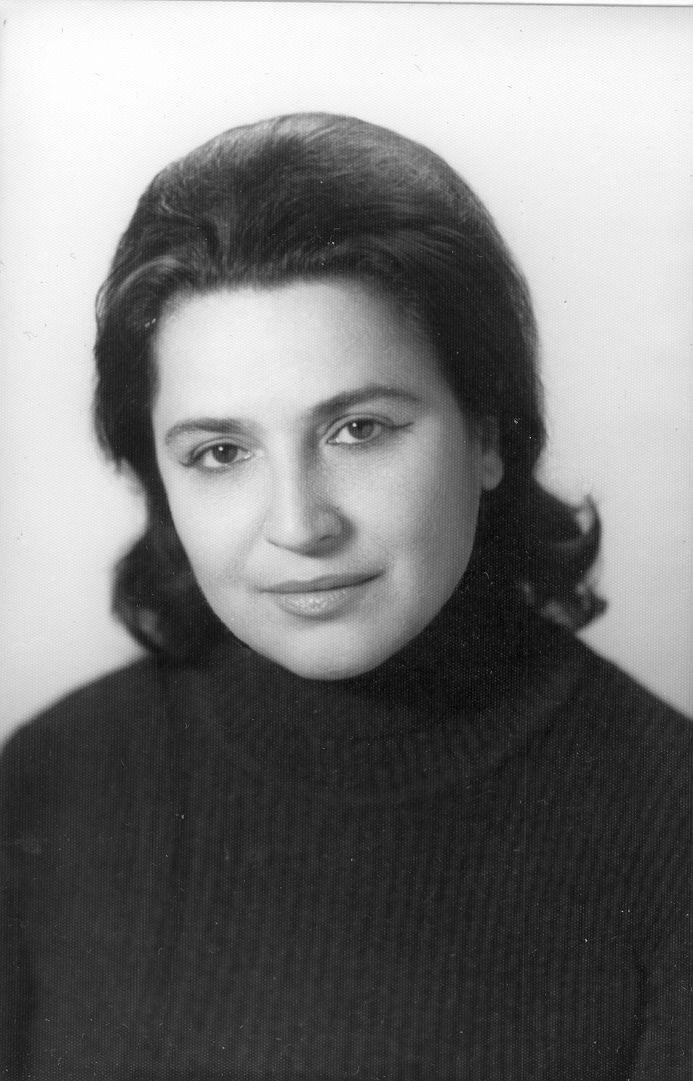
Vera Baeva

Vera Baeva (Bulgarian: Вера Баева; 18 March 1930 − 16 June 2017) was a Bulgarian writer and composer.

== Biography ==
She was born in Burgas and studied at the Sofia State Academy of Music with Dimiter Nenov, Marin Goleminov and Lyubomir Pipkov.

After graduating in 1953, Baeva worked as a choral conductor for Radio Sofia and as a pianist, performing with various ensembles and also the Bulgarian National Radio Symphony Orchestra. She taught voice from 1982 to 1988 at the State Academy of Music and chamber music at the Open Society Foundation from 1993. Baeva wrote two books of short stories.

== Works ==
Baeva composed over 200 vocal, instrumental and orchestras works. Selected compositions include:

- Mothers' Prayer for soprano, flute, trumpet, snare-drum, violoncello, double bass and piano
- Pirin, cantata (1954)
- I Bow for soloist, reader, mixed choir and orchestra (1975)
- My Homeland for choir and orchestra (1985)
- Butterflies, ritual music based on traditional tunes for female voices choir, flute, double bass, piano, organ and percussion
- Revelation, cycle of four songs for female voices choir, flute and piano after lyrics by St. Pencheva (1981)
- Tangra, ritual dance for male voices choir, flute, double bass, piano and percussion (1991)
- Modern Tarnovo for piano and orchestra (1980)
- String Quartet
- Piano Trio
- Sonata for violin and piano (1988)
- Two Impressions for violoncello (1981)
- Two Pieces for violin and piano (2002)
- Circus for reader, flute, violoncello, piano and percussion (2003)
- Five Preludes for piano (1974)
- Sonata Do-Re for two grand pianos (eight hands) (1976)
- Sonata for eight hands (1987)
- Three songs for soprano and piano, on poems by Blaga Dimitrova (1976)
- Men’s Moods, three songs, lyrics by Dimitar Metodiev (1977)
- Three Songs for mezzo-soprano and piano, lyrics by Emilya Karapetrova (2003)

Her music has been recorded and issued on media, including:

- Baeva, Vera-Glinka, Taneev, Rachmaninov, Bulakhov, Varlamov, Gurilev etc. LP Russia Melodia EX/NM 1772
