= Denis Bayev =

Ukrainian ice hockey player (born 1983)

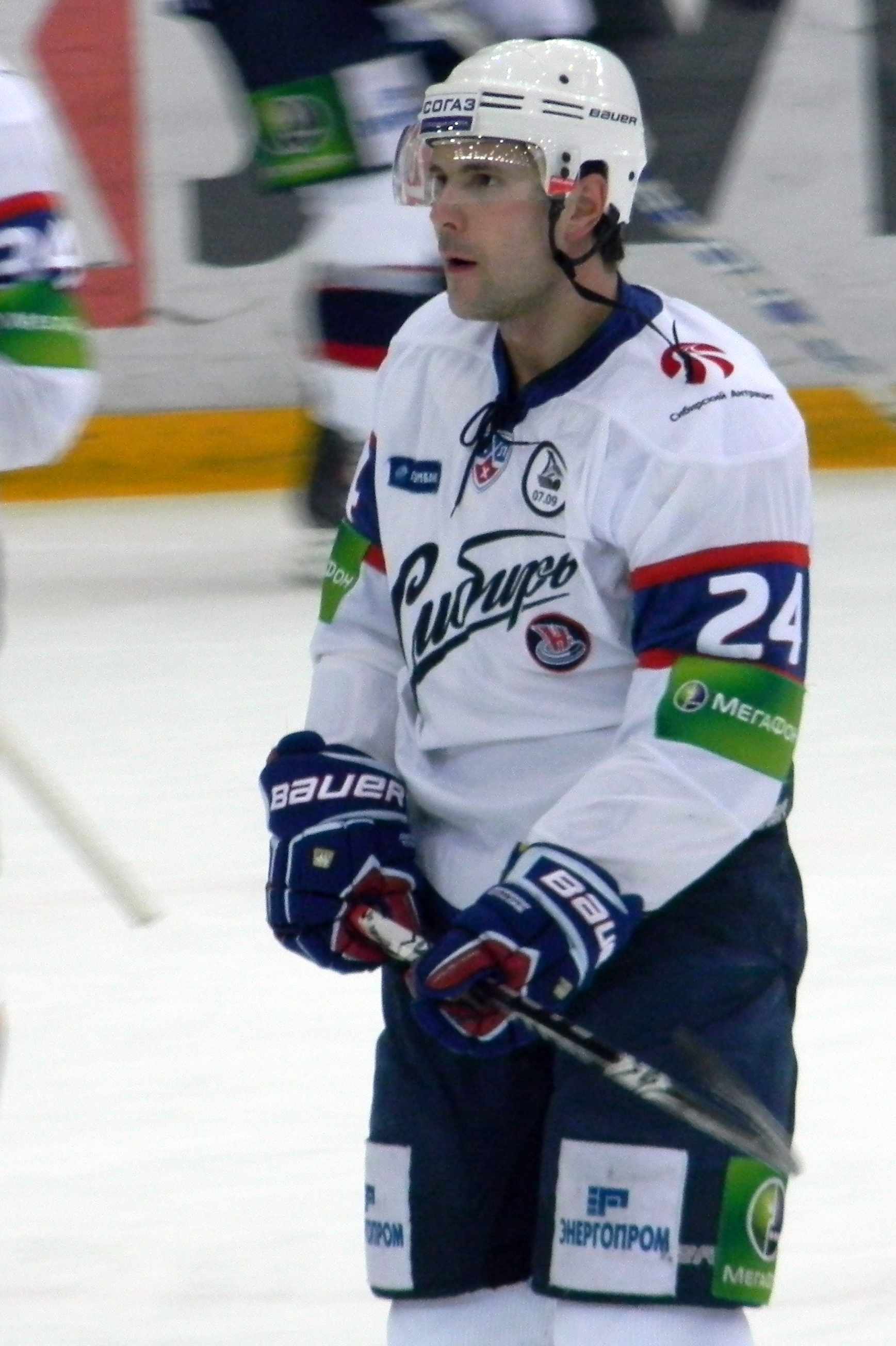
- Born: November 3, 1983 (age 41); Konotop, Ukrainian SSR, Soviet Union
- Height: 6 ft 0 in (183 cm)
- Weight: 205 lb (93 kg; 14 st 9 lb)
- Position: Defence
- KHL team: Traktor Chelyabinsk
- Playing career: 2004–present

Denis Yuriiovych Bayev (Ukrainian: Денис Юрійович Баєв, born November 3, 1983) is a Ukrainian professional ice hockey defenceman who currently plays for Traktor Chelyabinsk of the Kontinental Hockey League (KHL).

== Personal ==
Bayev was born in Konotop, Sumy Oblast, in Ukraine, where his father, Yuri Korneyevich, served in the military. His mother, Tamara, is a teacher of Russian language and Russian literature. His wife is Christina Bayev.
