= McBay =

McBay is a surname. Notable people with the surname include:

- Henry Cecil McBay (1914–1995), American chemist and educator
- Shirley McBay (1935–2021), American mathematician and non-profit chief executive

== See also ==
- McBey
