= Atle Pettersen =

Norwegian singer (born 1989)

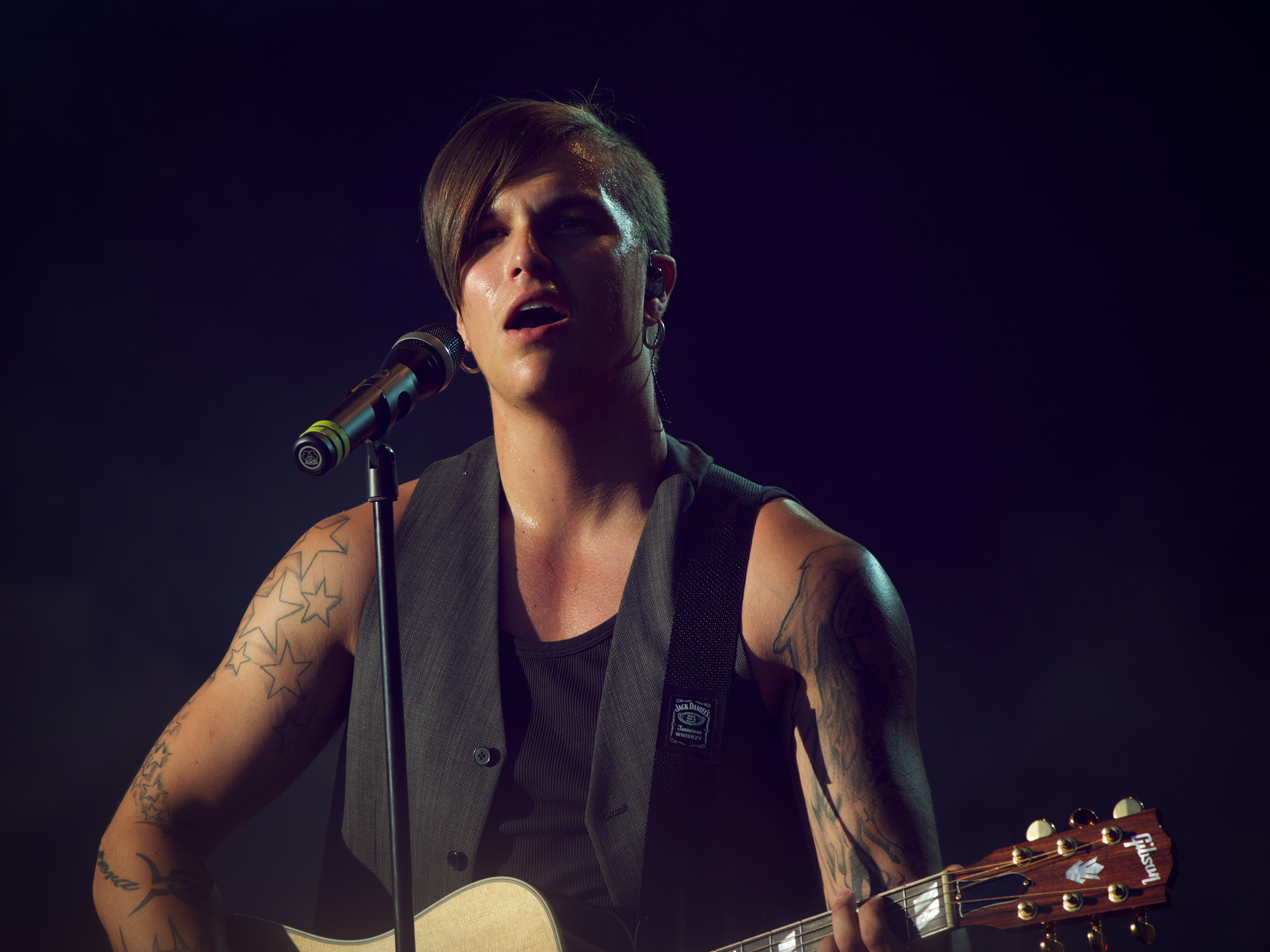
- Atle Pettersen in Norwegian X Factor (2010)

Background information
- Born: 5 September 1989 (age 36); Skien, Norway
- Genres: Pop, progressive metal, rock
- Occupations: Singer, songwriter, record producer, musician
- Instruments: Vocals, guitar
- Years active: 2005 – present

Atle Pettersen (born 5 September 1989) is a Norwegian singer and songwriter from Skien and lead singer of the band The Scheen.

== Beginnings ==
Pettersen was born in Skien, and took part, aged 14, in the 2003 edition of Melodi Grand Prix Junior with the song "Hekta på brett" that he had written himself. The song was performed with Stine. In 2006, he participated in Kjempesjansen on NRK.

== In X Factor ==
In autumn 2010 Atle Pettersen participated in the Norwegian version of The X Factor on TV 2 Pettersen auditioned with a song written by himself and other members of Above Symmetry called "Traces Inside". Reaching the live shows, Pettersen was mentored by Marion Ravn. Atle Pettersen finished runner-up behind winner Hans Bollandsås.

== After X Factor ==
On 4 December 2010 he appeared at the TV 2 Artist Gala performing "Lean on Me" with Annsofi Pettersen and Mohamed Abdi Farah and in Spring 2011, he appeared as guest artist for the symphonic power metal band Kamelot Pettersen was the lead singer of the progressive metal Above Symmetry together with Robin Ognedal (guitars), Joachim Strøm Ekelund (drums), Nickolas Main Henriksen (keyboards) and Rein Blomquist (bass). They were originally called 'Aspera', but were threatened with legal action by another band with the same name, forcing the change to Above Symmetry in 2010. They were signed to InsideOut Records and released a record called Ripples in April 2011. The band disbanded a year later. Together with Ognedal, Henriksen and Blomquist he formed the hard-rock band The Scheen in 2013, recruiting Tobias Ørnes Andersen on drums.

In autumn 2011, he took part in TV 2's reality show Skal vi danse (Dancing with the Stars franchise), partnering with Marianne Sandaker. winning the competition after beating Kari Traa in the final. He also featured in advertisements for the Italian fashion label Police.

Pettersen participated in Melodi Grand Prix 2021 the national final to choose the representative for Norway in the Eurovision Song Contest 2021 with his song "World on Fire", Pettersen sang in the final but failed to make the final 4. He would participate in Melodi Grand Prix again in 2023 with the song "Masterpiece", qualifying for the final and placing third.

== Discography ==
=== Albums ===
- 2011: Based on a True Story (#3 on Norwegian Albums Chart)

==== With Above Symmetry ====
- 2011: Ripples

=== Singles ===
- 2010: "Light On" (David Cook cover) (#8 on Norwegian Singles Chart)
- 2017: "Number One" (with Lisa Ajax)
- 2017: "Misbehave"
- 2019: "Juletid"
- 2021: ''World On Fire'' (Final - Melodi Grand Prix 2021)
- 2023: ''Masterpiece'' (Melodi Grand Prix 2023)
