= James McBey =

British artist (1883–1959)

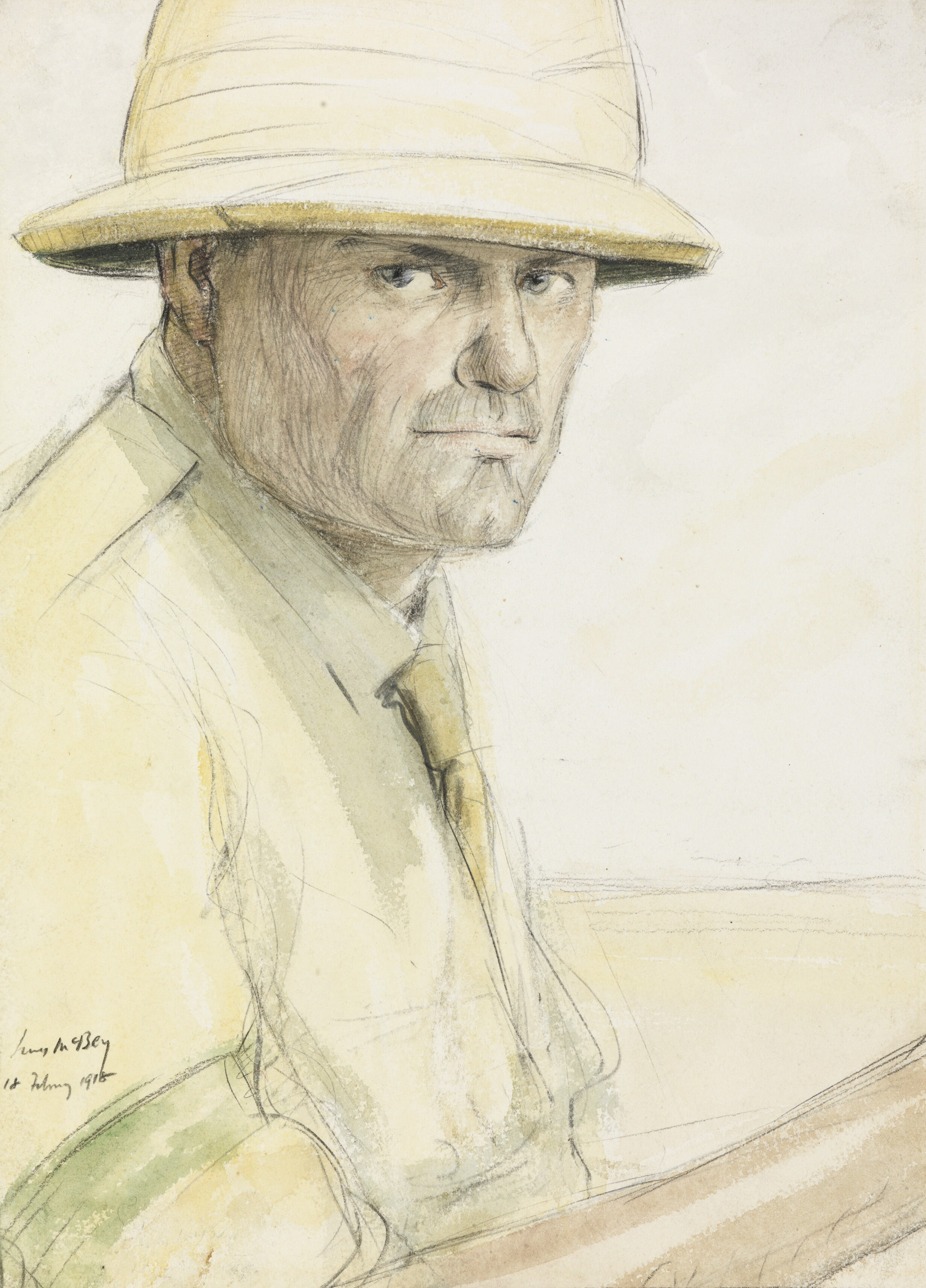
- Portrait of the Artist, 1918
- Born: James McBey; 23 December 1883; Newburgh, Aberdeenshire, Scotland
- Died: 1 December 1959 (aged 75); Tangier, Morocco
- Education: Gray's School of Art
- Known for: Painting, Etching

James McBey (23 December 1883 – 1 December 1959) was a largely self-taught Scottish artist and etcher whose prints were highly valued during the later stages of the etching revival in the early 20th century. He was awarded an Honorary Doctor of Letters by Aberdeen University.

== Early years ==
McBey was born in Newburgh, Aberdeenshire, Scotland, educated at his village school, and at the age of 15 years became a clerk in a local bank. After reading an article on etching in an art magazine, he borrowed from Aberdeen public library Maxime Lalanne’s treatise on etching Traité de la Gravure a l’Eau-Forte, attended evening classes at Gray's School of Art, and taught himself how to create etchings on zinc plates. He printed the results on paper using a domestic mangle. By 1910 he had enough confidence in his own ability to abandon banking and spent the summer in the Netherlands where he viewed etchings by Rembrandt and etched 21 plates of his own. From 1910 onwards he travelled widely, visiting Europe, North Africa and America. By 1911 his etchings were of sufficiently high quality to earn him an exhibition at the Goupil Gallery in London and his prints were published in both London and Glasgow. In 1912 McBey travelled to Morocco with James Kerr Lawson and began working in watercolours.

== World War I ==
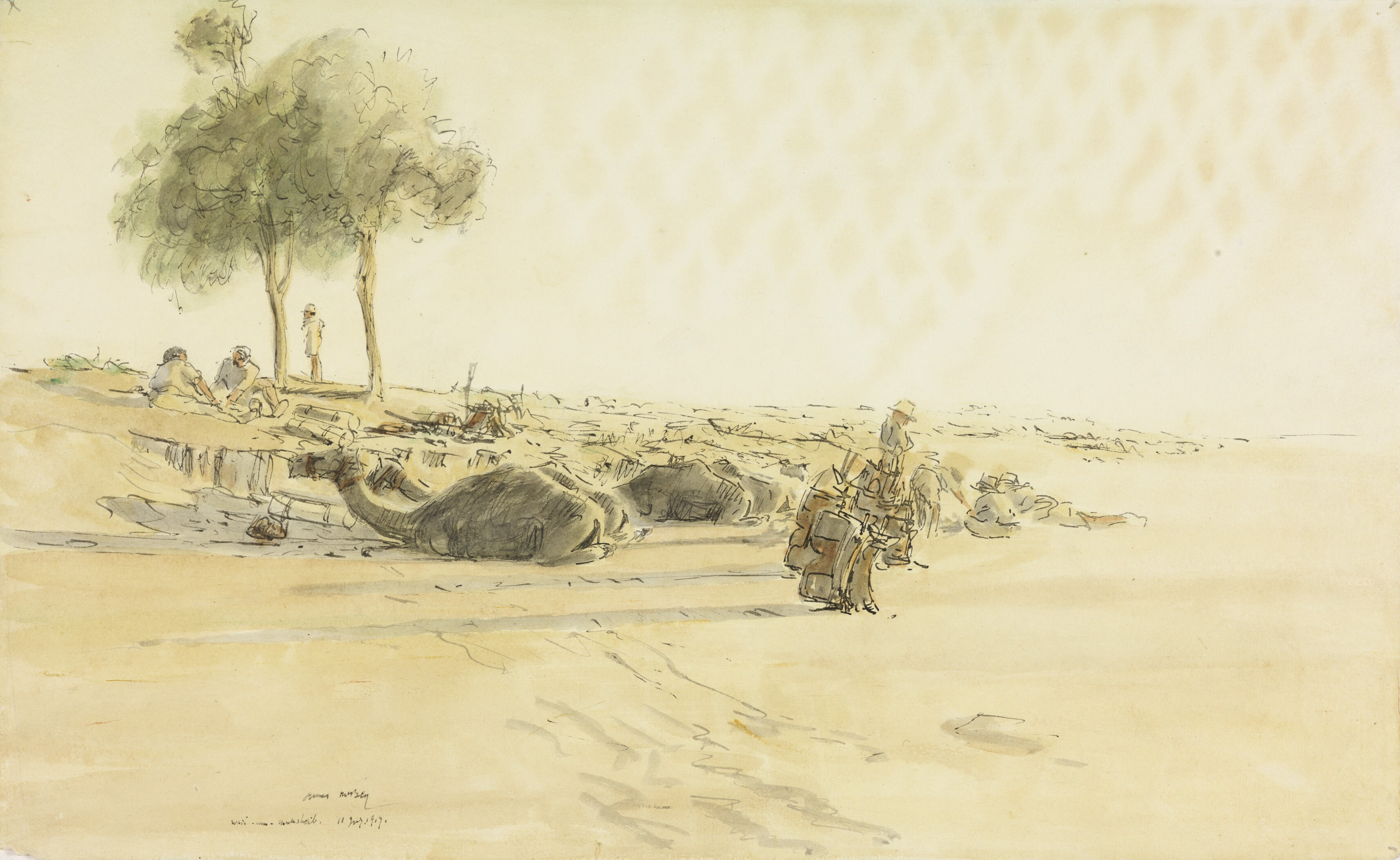
The Long Patrol- the Wadi (11 July 1917) (Art.IWM ART 1439)

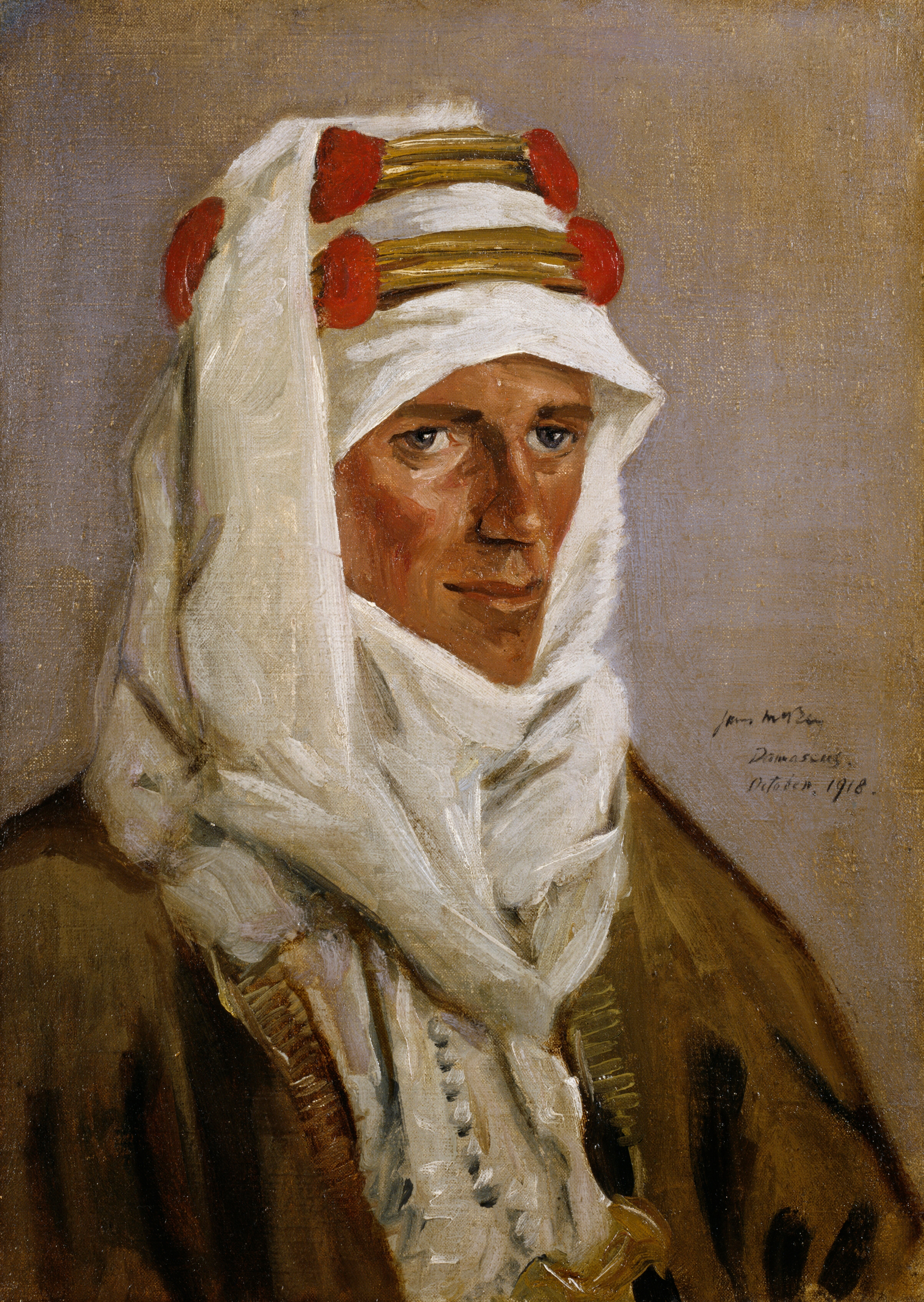
T. E. Lawrence, Damascus, October 1918

At the start of World War I, McBey's poor eyesight prevented him enlisting as a soldier but in February 1916 he was commissioned as a temporary second lieutenant while employed with the Army Printing and Stationery Service, based in Rouen. While on leave there he completed two series of sketches, France at her Furnaces, showing the munition works at Harfleur, and some views of the Somme. After these drawings were shown in London, McBey was appointed an official war artist to the Egyptian Expeditionary Force. Throughout 1917 and 1918 McBey accompanied the Allied advance in Palestine, from Gaza to Damascus. Working in both watercolours and oils McBey produced some 300 pieces, many of which are now in the Imperial War Museum. As well as portraits of the Allied commanders, McBey painted notable portraits of Emir Faisal, and T. E. Lawrence. McBey spent five days on a reconnaissance mission in the Sinai Desert with an Imperial Camel Corps patrol, consisting of rough-riders from the Australian outback, and witnessed Allenby's entry into Jerusalem in December 1917.

== Post-war career ==
Although the British government made little use of his work during the war, when he returned to Britain McBey produced a series of etchings based on his drawings of the Camel Corps patrol. The Long Patrol sold well and greatly enhanced his reputation. He made several visits thereafter to the Middle East and North Africa. During the post-war print boom in the 1920s his etchings fetched prices at auction that had only been achieved before by the Old Masters. McBey was featured by Malcolm Salaman in the second volume of the series Modern Masters of Etching and Salaman also compiled a catalogue of his work, published in 1929. McBey also had commissions to paint a number of formal portraits, including one of Sir Harry Lauder in 1921, which today is in the Glasgow Museums.

== Marriage and death ==
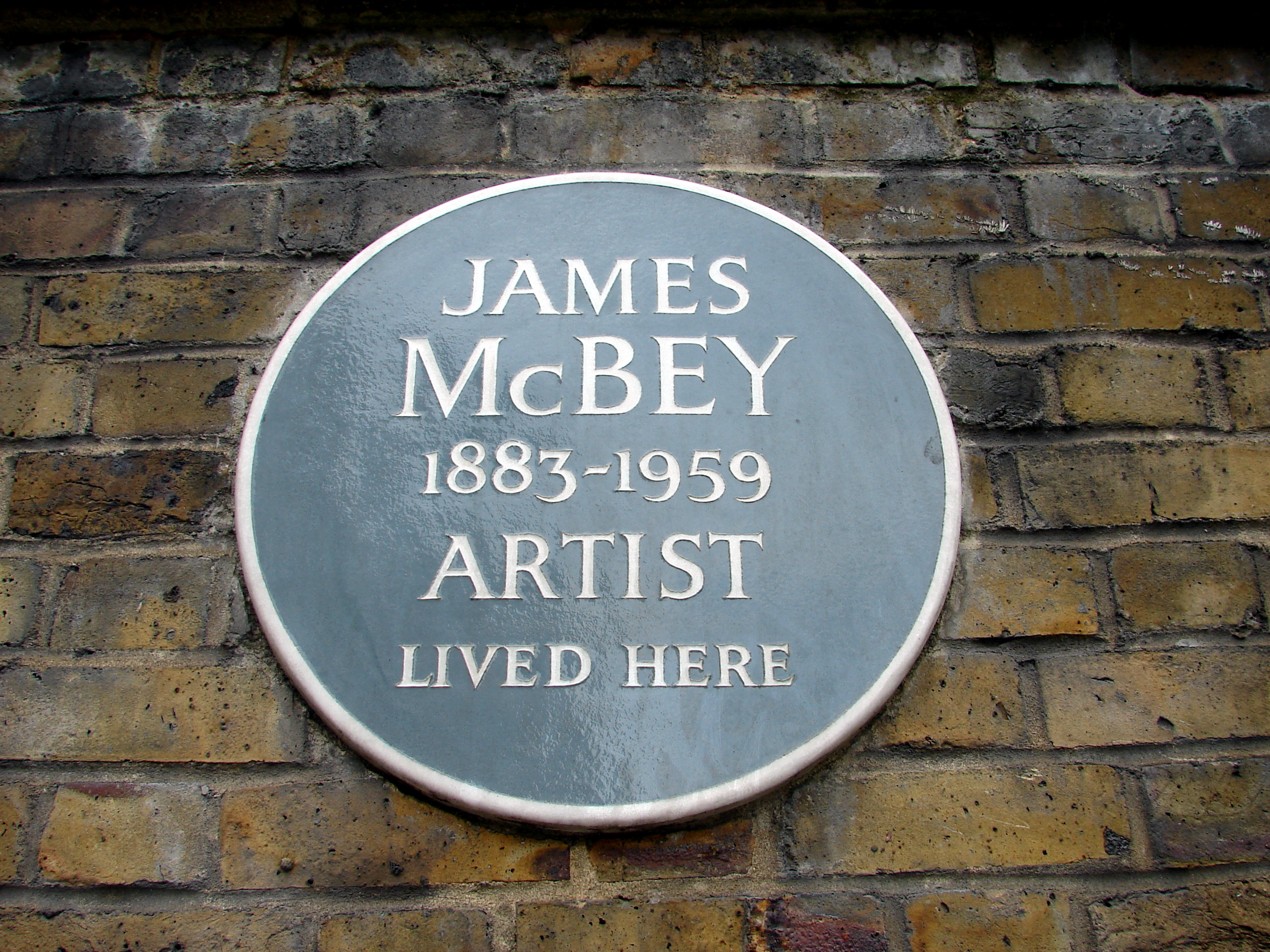
Plaque at 1 Holland Park Avenue, London W11.

In 1929 McBey visited America and returned in 1931 to marry Marguerite Loeb, a photographer and bookbinder from Philadelphia. In 1932 the couple bought a house near Tangier in Morocco and later bought a second property in Marrakesh. During World War II, McBey lived in America and in 1942 he became an American citizen. After the war he returned to live in Tangier, whilst making regular trips to both Britain and the United States. He died in Tangier, Morocco in 1959.

== Legacy ==
The work of James McBey is held by the National Portrait Gallery, London; the Fine Arts Museum of San Francisco; the National Gallery of Art, Washington; the Huntington Library, California; and by the Aberdeen Art Gallery where the McBey Art Reference Library was established in his name in 1961, based on a bequest from McBey’s wife. There is an almost complete collection of his etchings at the Boston Public Library.
