= Thomas Bay (conductor) =

Danish-Swedish musician, conductor, and theatrical performer

Thomas Bay is Danish-Swedish musician, conductor, and theatrical performer educated at Danish National School of Performing Arts in Copenhagen and at the Mountview Academy of Theatre Arts in London. He has worked throughout Scandinavia, as well as in England. As a conductor and pianist, he performed Spamalot in Tivoli in Copenhagen and The Hunchback of Notre Dame at Gamle Scene in Denmark.

As a performer, he has appeared as a concert soloist in the West End, the Gothenburg Opera in Sunset Boulevard, and at Opera North in Leeds, UK. Together with Mads Æbeløe Nielsen, there have been numerous translations for musicals in Denmark, including Disney's The Little Mermaid and The Hunchback of Notre Dame.

As an artistic director, he presented American Idiot and Into the Woods in the Glass Room in Tivoli, Copenhagen. He also served as the musical director and conductor for the performance of Chess på Svenska in Kristianstad in November/December 2017, in Sweden, Malmö Opera, Sweden as well as Chess på Svenska in June/July 2022, in Helsingborg, Sweden.
