= Eline Thorp =

- Born: Eline Thorp Steffensen; 1993 (age 31–32)
- Origin: Hamarøy, Nordland, Norway
- Occupations: Singer, songwriter
- Labels: Beyond Records
- Website: www.elinethorp.no

Eline Thorp Steffensen (born 6 September 1993) is a Norwegian singer and songwriter from Hamarøy Municipality, Nordland county. She received national attention when she was titled this week's Urørt in 2011. The same year she played at festivals like by:Larm, Hove Festival, Slottsfjell Festival and the Bukta Festival.

== Career ==
In 2013, she released her first single, "The Game," along with a corresponding music video. In 2014, her debut album, Mirror's Edge, was released on the label Beyond Records. The album received dice five from VG's reviewer Stein Østbø.

In 28 January 2023, Thorp participated in the third semi-final of Melodi Grand Prix 2023 with the song "Not Meant To Be". She advanced to the final round on February 4, and placed sixth.

== Discography ==
=== Solo albums ===
| Title | Released | Label |
|---|---|---|
| Mirror's Edge | 2014 | Beyond Records |

=== Singles ===
| Title | Released | Label |
|---|---|---|
| "The Game" | 2013 | Beyond Records |
| "Winter Dust" | 2014 | Beyond Records |
| "Violence Done Well" | 2014 | Beyond Records |
| "Not Meant To Be" | 2023 | Arctic Rights Management |
