= Kristiania University College =

Education organization in Oslo, Norway

Kristiania University of Applied Sciences
- Høyskolen Kristiania
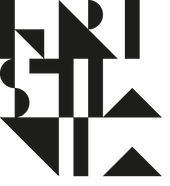
- Type: Private University College
- Established: 1914; 112 years ago
- President: Solfrid Lind
- Students: 18,973
- Location: Oslo, Norway
- Campus: Oslo, Bergen
- Website: www.kristiania.no/en/

Kristiania University of Applied Sciences is an educational institution in Norway organized through the Ernst G. Mortensen foundation. As of 2022, Kristiania has approximately 19 000 students and provides higher education in Oslo, Bergen and online.

Kristiania offers a variety of study programs within communication, management, marketing, finance, innovation, technology, art, design and media.

The headquarters are located in Oslo, Norway, and the university college is named after Oslo's previous name, Kristiania.

== Campus ==
Kristiania University of Applied Sciences is made up of two campuses – one in Oslo and one in Bergen. Campus Oslo consists of several buildings located in the city center:

=== Campus Oslo ===
- Kvadraturen
- Urtegata
- Fjerdingen
- Spikersuppa – Kristiania Professional College

=== Campus Bergen ===
- Kalfarveien

== History ==
=== 1914 – Norsk Korrespondenceskole (NKS) ===
In 1914, the founder of the institution, Ernst G. Mortensen, decided to launch education through correspondence courses. His aim was to make education available to everyone, regardless of their location. Norsk Korrespondenceskole (NKS) grew from 125 students in 1914 to 9 000 students in 1929.

In 1939, Ernst G. Mortensen was rewarded the title Knight of The Order of St. Olav, an award given for "distinguished services rendered to Norway and mankind".

=== 2016 – Kristiania University College ===
On 27 March 2015, the Norwegian government decided that structural changes and mergers of several universities and colleges in Norway was needed. As a response to this, Kristiania decided to merge Markedshøyskolen, Norges Kreative Høyskole, Norges Helsehøyskole, NKS Nettstudier and Høyskolen Campus Kristiania to one entity: Kristiania University of Applied Sciences. The architectural firm Snøhetta was involved in creating the university college's new visual identity. The expansion also continued, and the foundation incorporated Westerdals Oslo School of Arts, Communication and Technology to its portfolio in 2017.

== Student life ==
The Student Union at Kristiania University of Applied Sciences (SK) is an independent organization run by and for the students. Its purpose is to cater to the students' interests and ensure their opinions are heard by the board, various industries and the community as a whole.

== Notable graduates ==
- JONE - singer nominated for the Spellemannprisen
