= Alessandra Mele =

Norwegian-Italian singer (born 2002)

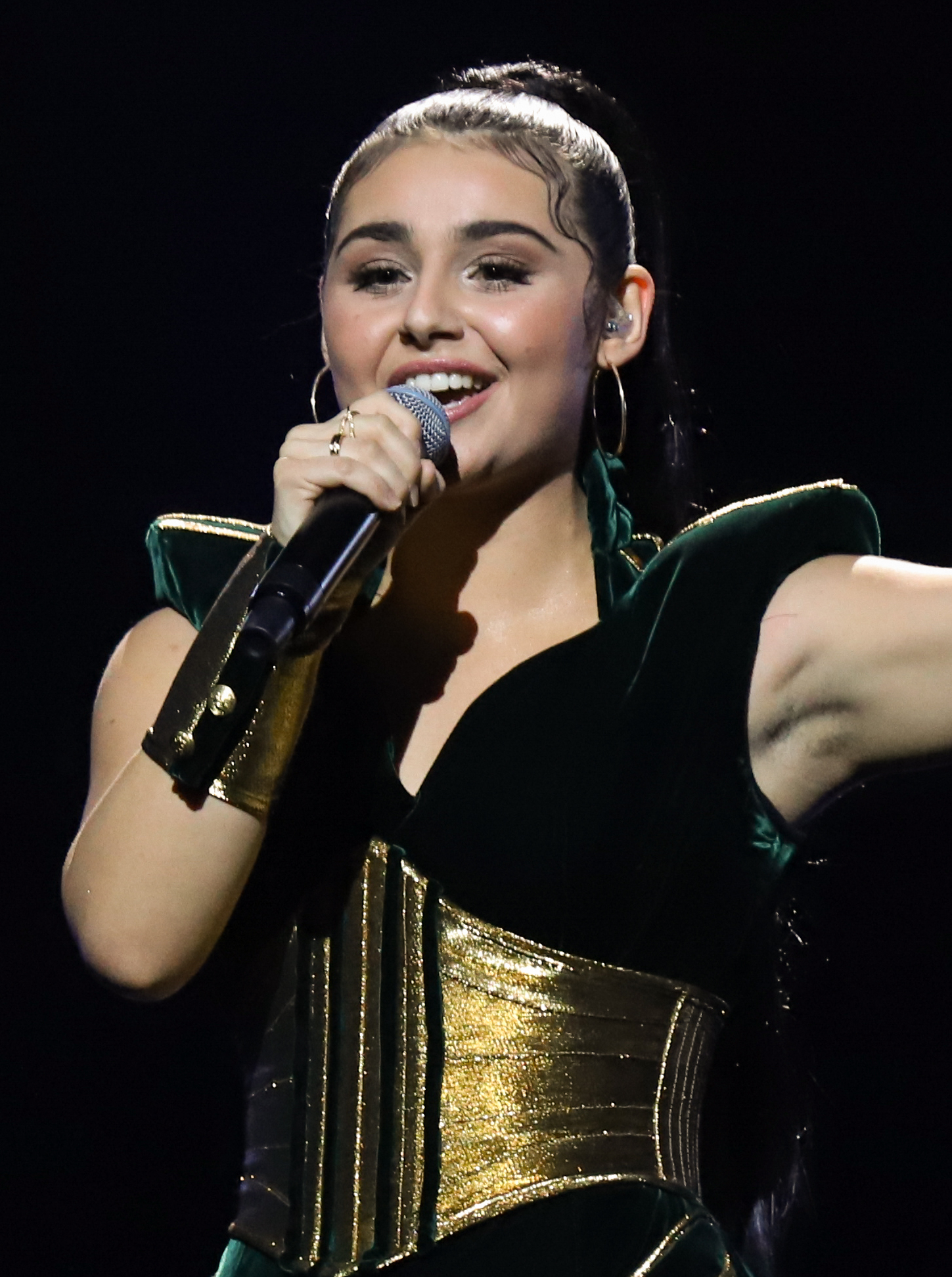
- Mele performing at Melodi Grand Prix 2023

Background information
- Also known as: Alessandra
- Born: Alessandra Watle Mele; 5 September 2002 (age 24); Pietra Ligure, Savona, Italy
- Origin: Lillehammer, Norway
- Genres: EDM; pop
- Occupation: Singer
- Years active: 2022–present
- Label: Starlab Music
- Website: alessandra-music.com

Alessandra Watle Mele (born 5 September 2002), known mononymously as Alessandra, is an Italian-Norwegian singer. She competed in the seventh season of The Voice – Norges beste stemme in 2022, reaching the live shows. She represented Norway in the Eurovision Song Contest 2023 with "Queen of Kings", which finished in 5th place at the grand final with 268 points. Her track peaked at number one in Norway and was a top ten hit in eleven countries.

== Early life and education ==
Mele was born on 5 September 2002 in Pietra Ligure, Savona to an Italian father from Albenga and a Norwegian mother from Stathelle, and grew up in Cisano sul Neva. At the age of twelve, she won the fifth edition of VB Factor, a local talent show in the Val Bormida region. After graduating from high school in 2019, she relocated to Norway and moved in with her maternal grandparents in Porsgrunn, before moving to Lillehammer to study at the Lillehammer Institute of Music Production and Industries.

== Career ==
=== 2022: The Voice Norway ===
In 2022, Mele was a participant in the seventh season of The Voice – Norges beste stemme, the Norwegian version of The Voice franchise. After her Blind Audition, she joined the team of coach Espen Lind. She was eliminated in the live shows.

The Voice Norway performances and results
Round	Song	Original artist	Result
Blind Auditions	"I Will Pray (Pregherò)"	Giorgia feat. Alicia Keys	Joined Team Espen Lind
The Battles	"I Just Can't Stop Loving You"	Michael Jackson and Siedah Garrett	Advanced
Knockouts	"The Moon Is a Harsh Mistress"	Jimmy Webb	Advanced
Live Show 1	"One Night Only"	Deena Jones & the Dreams	Eliminated

=== 2023–2024: Melodi Grand Prix and Eurovision Song Contest ===
On 4 January 2023, Mele was announced as one of twenty-one artists to compete in Melodi Grand Prix 2023, the Norwegian national selection for the Eurovision Song Contest 2023. She performed her entry "Queen of Kings" in the first semi-final on 14 January 2023, and was among the three acts from that semi-final that qualified for the final on 4 February 2023. She went on to win the competition, receiving the most points from both the public and the international jury, thereby winning the right to represent Norway at the Eurovision Song Contest 2023 in Liverpool, United Kingdom. She performed in the semi-final on 9 May 2023 and qualified for the grand final. She finished fifth in the final.

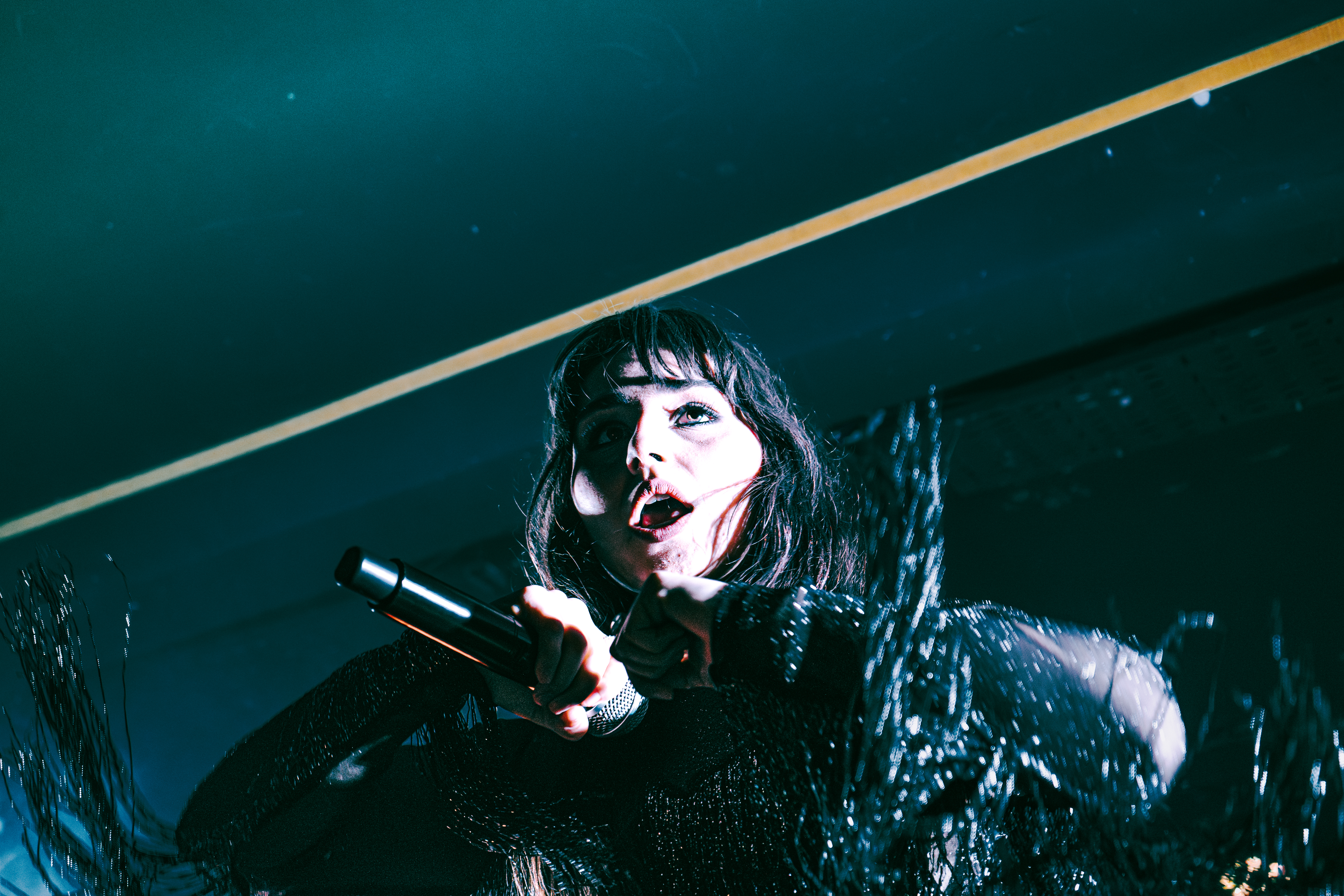
Alessandra Mele performing in Dublin, Ireland as part of her Queen of Kings Tour in 2024

Mele participated as the duet partner of the Ghost in the fourth season of Maskorama.

On 10 May 2024, she was announced as Norway's spokesperson for the Eurovision Song Contest 2024 final. However, the day after in the hours before the final was due to take place, she announced that she would step down from the role, with NRK's channel hostess Ingvild Helljesen replacing her as spokesperson.

== Personal life ==
In an interview with Eurovision Fun, Mele told she is bisexual, with her song "Queen of Kings" representing her experiences as a bisexual woman.

Mele was previously in a relationship with Ludwig Gassner.

== Discography ==
=== Extended plays ===
Title	Details
Best Year of My Life	Released: 16 February 2024; Label: Island Records; Formats: Digital download, streaming, CD
Peperoncina	Released: 14 November 2025; Label: Universal; Formats: Digital download, streaming

=== Singles ===
List of singles as lead artist, with selected chart positions and certifications, showing year released and album name
Title	Year	Peak chart positions										Certifications	Album or EP
Title	Year	NOR	FIN	HUN	IRE	LTU	NLD	POL	SWE	UK	WW	Certifications	Album or EP
"Queen of Kings"	2023	1	3	6	18	7	12	8	7	10	69	IFPI NOR: Platinum; BPI: Silver; GLF: Platinum; ZPAV: 3× Platinum	Best Year of My Life
"Pretty Devil"	2023	40	—	—	—	—	—	—	—	—	—		Best Year of My Life
"Bad Bitch"	2023	—	—	—	—	—	—	—	—	—	—		Best Year of My Life
"Heavy"	2023	—	—	—	—	—	—	—	—	—	—		Best Year of My Life
"Narcissist"	2024	—	—	—	—	—	—	—	—	—	—		Best Year of My Life
"Supposed to Be"	2024	—	—	—	—	—	—	—	—	—	—		Non-album singles
"Marameo"	2024	—	—	—	—	—	—	—	—	—	—		Non-album singles
"Language of Love"	2025	—	—	—	—	—	—	—	—	—	—		Peperoncina
"Non Stop"	2025	—	—	—	—	—	—	—	—	—	—		Peperoncina
"Toscana"	2025	—	—	—	—	—	—	—	—	—	—		Peperoncina
"Queen Almighty"	2025	—	—	—	—	—	—	—	—	—	—		Peperoncina
"Head Over Water"	2026	—	—	—	—	—	—	—	—	—	—		TBA
"—" denotes a recording that did not chart or was not released in that territory.

=== Other charted songs ===
Title	Year	Peak chart positions	Album or EP
Title	Year	CZE Air.	Album or EP
"Not That Deep"	2025	14	Peperoncina

== Notes ==
Awards and achievements
Preceded by Subwoolfer with "Give That Wolf a Banana"	Norway in the Eurovision Song Contest; 2023	Succeeded by Gåte with "Ulveham"
