= Melodi Grand Prix =

Annual music competition in Norway

- Genre: Various
- Location: Norway
- Years active: 1960–present
- Founders: Norsk rikskringkasting (NRK)
- Website: Official website

Melodi Grand Prix (Norwegian: [mɛlʊˈdiː ɡrɑn ˈpriː]), commonly known as Grand Prix and MGP, sometimes as Norsk Melodi Grand Prix, is an annual music competition organised by Norwegian public broadcaster Norsk rikskringkasting (NRK). It determines its entry for the Eurovision Song Contest, and has been staged almost every year since 1960.

The festival has produced three Eurovision winners, a non-winning televote winner and nine top-five placings for Norway at the contest. However, Norway holds the record for the number of entries placing last since entering Eurovision; 12 in all. Despite this, the competition still makes considerable impact on music charts in Norway and other Nordic countries, with the 2008 winner topping the Norwegian charts.

== Origins ==
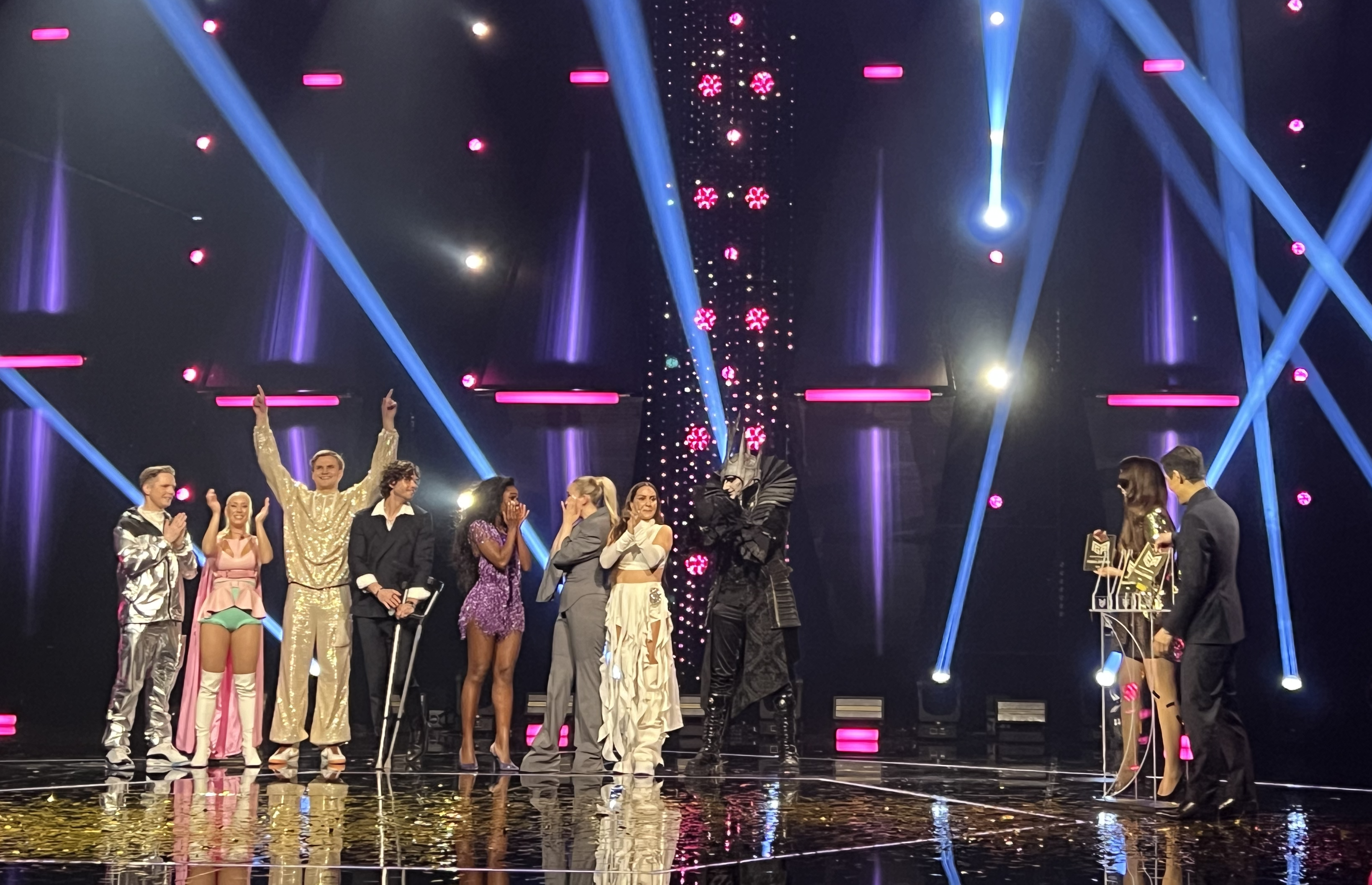
The participating artists of the first semi-final of Melodi Grand Prix 2024 on stage

The Eurovision Song Contest began on 24 May 1956 with its first edition in Lugano, Switzerland. Norway's first contest was the fifth, the 1960 contest. The first Melodi Grand Prix was held on 20 February at the NRK headquarters in Oslo. Ten songs competed in the radio semi-final, held on 2 February, where the top 5 songs would progress to the televised contest. However this number was increased to 6 after three songs tied for fourth place. The winner of the televised contest was "Voi Voi", performed by Nora Brockstedt. Brockstedt performed Norway's first Eurovision entry in London on 29 March, and placed a respectable fourth. Brockstedt also went on to win the following year's contest as well with "Sommer i Palma".

Melodi Grand Prix has failed to be staged on three occasions. In 1970, Norway was absent from the contest due to a Nordic boycott of the voting system, which had led to a four-way tie for first place at the 1969 contest. In 1991, the event was canceled after the NRK understood that the quality of the competing songs was weak and therefore opted for an internal selection instead. The final instance of no Melodi Grand Prix was in 2002, when Norway was relegated from competing in the 2002 contest after finishing in last place the previous year. The 2020 edition of Melodi Grand Prix was the first instance where the winner did not participate in Eurovision, as the contest itself was cancelled due to the COVID-19 pandemic.

== Winners ==
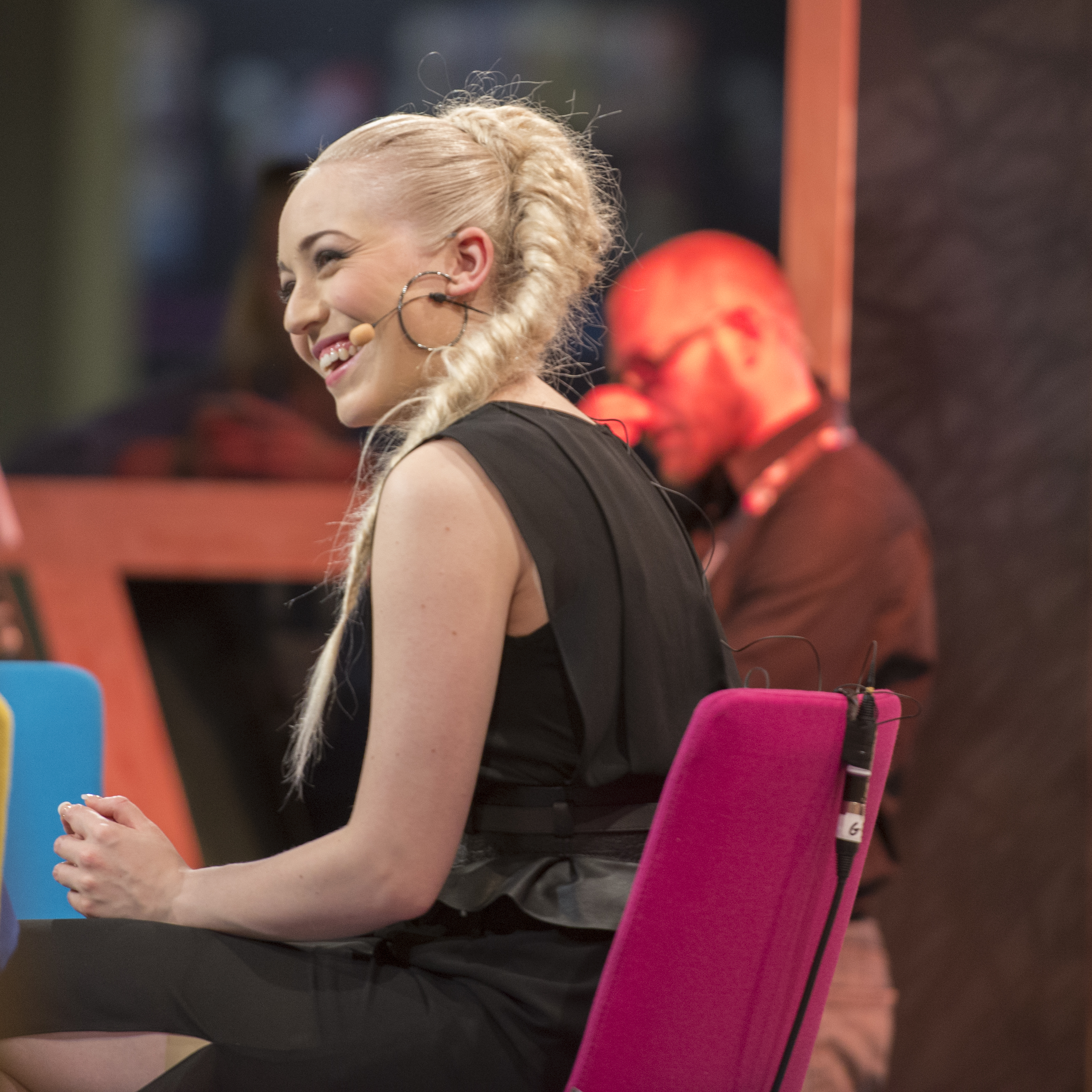
2013 winner Margaret Berger went on to finish fourth at the Eurovision Song Contest 2013 final in Malmö

All winners of Melodi Grand Prix have gone on to represent Norway at the Eurovision Song Contest, apart from the 2020 winner after the Eurovision Song Contest 2020 was cancelled due to the COVID-19 pandemic. Norway has won it three times: in 1985, 1995 and 2009. Norway has also come last 12 times, more than any other nation: in 1963, 1969, 1974, 1976, 1978, 1981, 1990, 1997, 2001, 2004, 2012, and 2024.

The following table lists those entries which finished fifth or higher at Eurovision:

Year	Song	Artist	Position	Points
1960	"Voi Voi"	Nora Brockstedt	4th	11
1966	"Intet er nytt under solen"	Åse Kleveland	3rd	15
1985	"La det swinge"	Bobbysocks	1st	123
1988	"For vår jord"	Karoline Krüger	5th	88
1993	"Alle mine tankar"	Silje Vige	5th	120
1995	"Nocturne"	Secret Garden	1st	148
1996	"I evighet"	Elisabeth Andreassen	2nd	114
2003	"I'm Not Afraid to Move On"	Jostein Hasselgård	4th	123
2008	"Hold On Be Strong"	Maria Haukaas Storeng	5th	182
2009	"Fairytale"	Alexander Rybak	1st	387
2013	"I Feed You My Love"	Margaret Berger	4th	191
2023	"Queen of Kings"	Alessandra	5th	268

== Archival status ==
Unlike many of the other European broadcasters responsible for Eurovision Song Contest national finals, most editions of Melodi Grand Prix have survived in NRK's archives, with only seven editions missing: 1960–1964, 1968, and 1972, while 1973 only exists as a low-quality off-air recording. Since 2014, NRK has digitised all existing Melodi Grand Prix editions and published them on its digital platform, where they are available for viewing worldwide. As the holder of the rights to the Eurovision Song Contest 1986 and 1996, NRK also made them available on its platform.

As revealed during the re-broadcast of the Eurovision Song Contest 1968 on 18 September 2021 as part of EurovisionAgain, in addition to its own productions, the NRK archives have also been helpful to the European Broadcasting Union's archival project for the Eurovision Song Contest, with the sole existing colour copy of the Eurovision 1968 final (which was the first edition to be broadcast in colour) being recovered from the NRK archives, alongside copies of several other contests, including 1960, the year of Norway's debut in Eurovision.

== See also ==
- Melodi Grand Prix Junior
- Dansk Melodi Grand Prix
- Melodifestivalen
- Sámi Grand Prix
- Norway in the Eurovision Song Contest
