= Patricie Fuxová =

Czech singer and songwriter (born 1991)

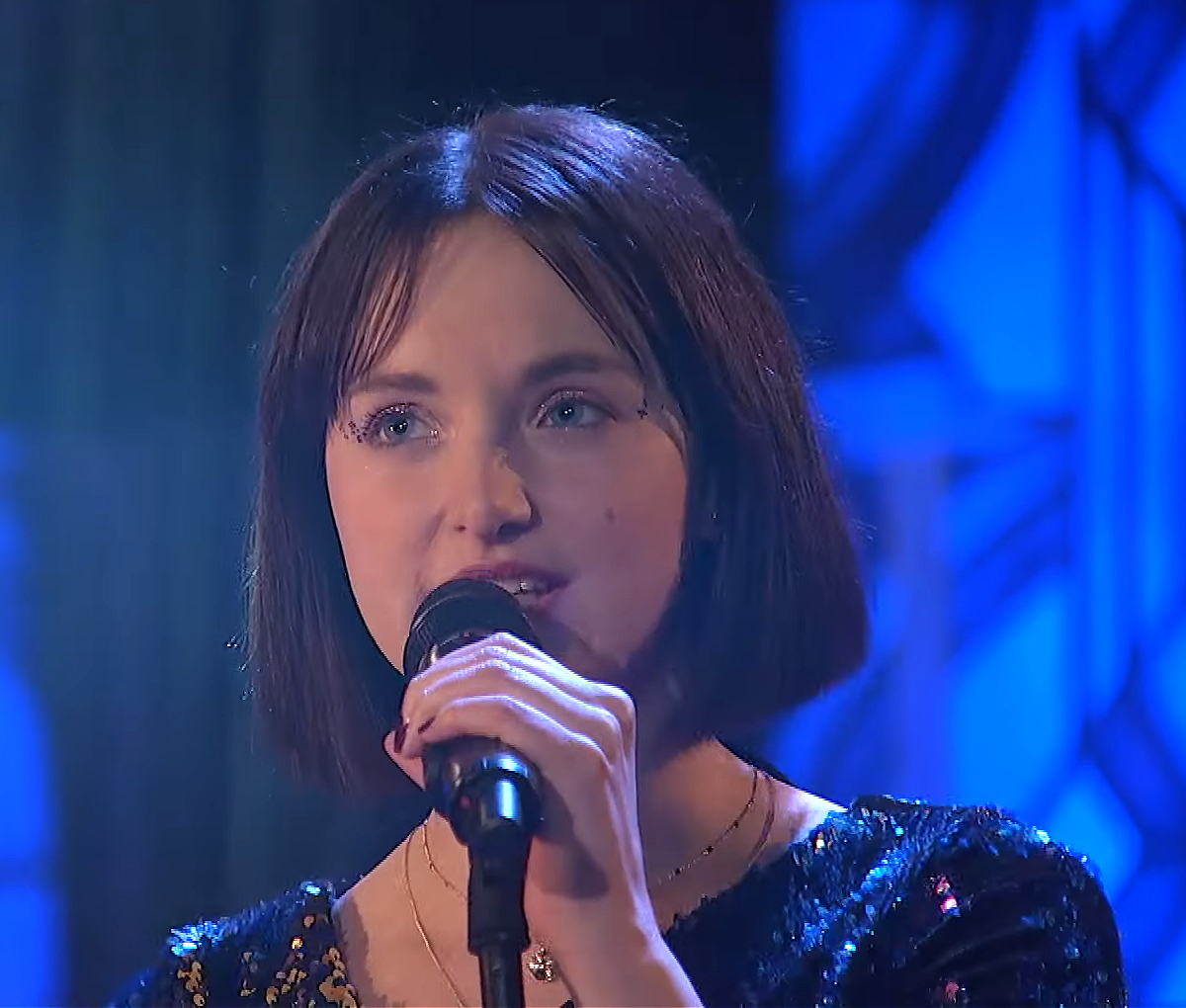
- Fuxová in 2021
- Born: 9 October 1991 (age 34); Prague, Czechoslovakia
- Other name: Patricie Kaňok
- Citizenship: Czech Republic
- Occupations: Singer; songwriter; writer
- Spouse: Tomáš Kaňok (m. 2022)

Patricie Kaňok (née Fuxová; born 9 October 1991) is a Czech singer, songwriter and writer. She is the lead vocalist, primary songwriter and founder of the folk band Vesna.

== Early life and education ==
Fuxová was born in Prague on 9 October 1991. She graduated from the Faculty of Fine Arts at Charles University, studied Text and Screenplay at the KJJ College of Music; she completed her master's degree in music at the Berklee College of Music in Boston.

== Career ==
In 2016, Fuxová founded the all-female band Vesna, inspired by pagan roots, artistic freedom and the feminine essence. In the book Pátá bohyně she describes Mary's meeting with the pagan goddesses Vesna, Živa, Mokoša and Morana.

As part of the band, Vesna wrote the song "My Sister's Crown", with which Fuxová participated in the Eurovision Song Contest 2023. She also writes music and lyrics for various Czech performers (Lucie Bílá, Ewa Farna, Karel Gott, Václav Neckář, Ilona Csáková).

== Personal life ==
Fuxová married Tomáš Kaňok in 2022. They have a daughter, born November 2024.

== Discography ==
- ANIMA (2020)
- Voda (2020)
- Nezapomeň (2019)
- Vesna & Věra Martinová Bílá laň (2019)
- Klip: Patricie Fuxová a Vojtěch Dyk – Láska z Kateřinic (2018)

== Bibliography ==
- Pátá bohyně. Brno: CPress, 2018. 167 pages. ISBN 978-80-264-2210-5.
- Sebemotivační deník na celý rok. Prague: Cosmopolis, 2019. 207 pages. ISBN 978-80-271-2926-3.
