= Vesna (band) =

Czech folk band

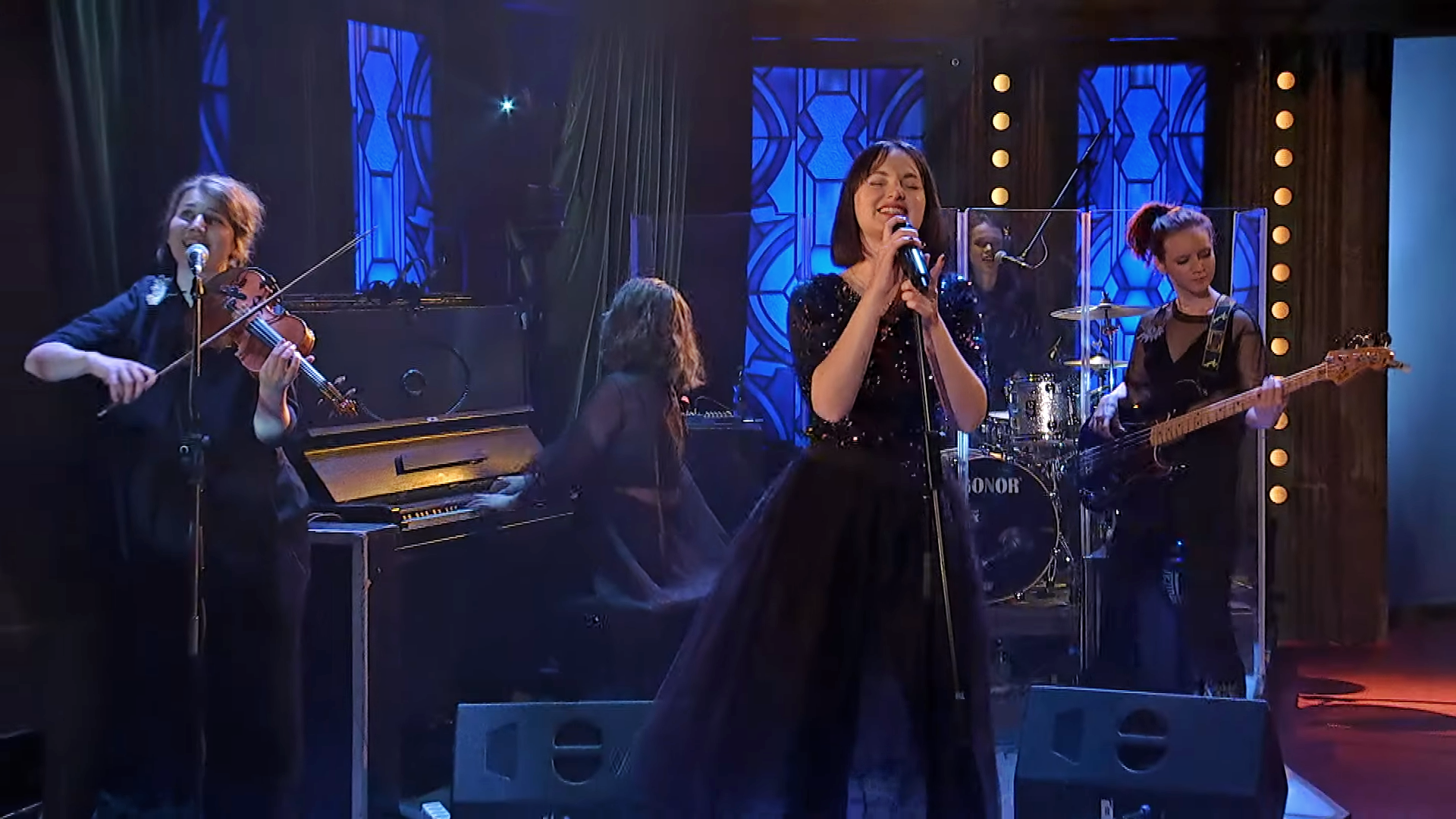
- Vesna in 2021; left to right: Juránková, Ochepovskaya, Fuxová, Mužátková and Čepková

Background information
- Origin: Prague, Czech Republic
- Genres: Folk; folk-pop; alternative pop
- Years active: 2016–present
- Members: Patricie Kaňok Fuxová; Bára Juránková; Olesya Ochepovskaya; Markéta Mužátková; Tereza Čepková
- Past members: Andrea Šulcová; Tanita Yankova
- Website: www.vesnamusic.com

Vesna (pronounced [ˈvɛsna]; named after the Slavic goddess of spring) is an all-female folk band based in the Czech Republic, consisting of five members (three Czech, one Slovak and one Russian). The band represented the Czech Republic in the Eurovision Song Contest 2023 with the song "My Sister's Crown", finishing in the top ten in the grand final with a score of 129 points.

== History ==
=== Formation and first singles ===
In 2016, band frontwoman Patricie Kaňok Fuxová wanted to create an all-woman band that celebrated "femininity and Slavic sisterhood". Although the band is considered to play Czech folk music, Fuxová does not consider themselves to play within the genre, stating "I don't see what we do with Vesna as folklore, they are not folk songs. For me, these are [not] songs that work with those archetypes". At the Jaroslav Ježek Conservatory, Fuxová met with future members Bára Juránková, who played the violin, Andrea Šulcová, and Tanita Yankova from Bulgaria, who both played the flute.

=== Pátá bohyně ===
In 2018, Šulcová and Yankova both left the group, and were replaced by Russian pianist Olesya Ochepovskaya and Czech drummer Markéta Vedralová. In that same year, the band released their first studio album, Pátá bohyně (transl. "The Fifth Goddess"). In an interview with Czech news magazine Týden, Fuxová stated that the album was inspired by both real life events that she had faced and by Czech stories and fairytales. The album won the Discovery of the Year award at the Czech music awards show Ceny Anděl 2018.

=== Anima ===
During the COVID-19 pandemic, the band, which at that point also included Slovak bassist Tereza Čepková, started work on a second studio album, Anima. In an interview, band member Bára Šůstková reported that the album was represented by animal motifs, the relationship between men and women, and the female body.

=== Eurovision Song Contest 2023 ===
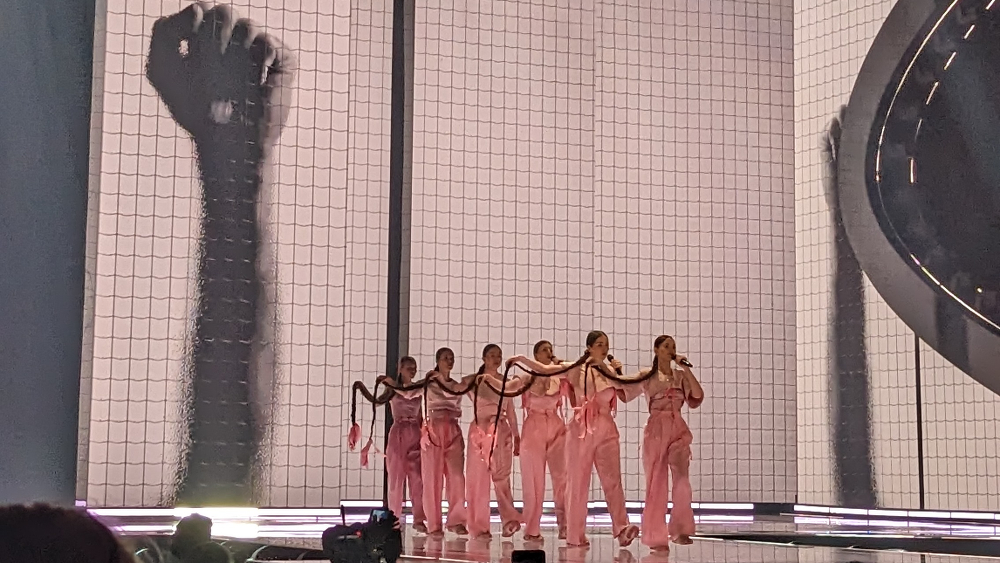
Vesna performing at the Eurovision 2023

On 16 January 2023, the band, with the return of Yankova, was revealed as one of six competitors in ESCZ 2023, the Czech national selection for the Eurovision Song Contest 2023. When the voting results were revealed on 7 February 2023, the band had earned 10,584 votes, winning by a margin of 6,368 votes, thus becoming the Czech representatives for the contest. Their song "My Sister's Crown" is about "all people who are experiencing some kind of unfreedom, as oppression from society, trends, technology, and it's such a symbol for these people to put on a crown and feel strong enough".

Vesna performed in the first semi-final held on 9 May 2023, placing fourth overall and qualifying for the final. They ultimately placed tenth with 129 points.

=== After Eurovision ===
On 17 July 2023, Vesna announced a European tour scheduled to take place between 1 and 24 November 2023 across Bulgaria, Hungary, Austria, Poland and the Czech Republic. Since July 2023, Yankova has again been inactive in the group.

In September 2023, the group released "Wolfrunners", the lead single from their upcoming LP Muzika Slavica, which was released the following November.

== Band members ==
=== Current members ===
- (Czech Republic) Patricie Kaňok Fuxová (2016–present) – vocals
- (Czech Republic) Bára Juránková (2016–present) – vocals, violin
- (Russia) Olesya Ochepovskaya (2018–present) – piano
- (Czech Republic) Markéta Mužátková (2018–present) – drums, vocals, guitar
- (Slovakia) Tereza Čepková (2019–present) – bass guitar

=== Former members ===
- (Czech Republic) Andrea Šulcová (2016–18) – flute
- (Bulgaria) Tanita Yankova (2016–18; 2023) – vocals, flute, piano

== Discography ==
=== Albums ===
Title	Details	Peak chart positions
Title	Details	CZE
Pátá bohyně	Released: 20 November 2018; Label: Warner Music Czech Republic	48
Anima	Released: 22 May 2020; Label: Warner Music Czech Republic	—
Muzika Slavica	Released: 22 November 2023; Label: Ruka Hore	—
Lidová	Released: 23 October 2026; Label: Self-released	—
"—" denotes an album that did not chart or was not released in that territory.

=== EPs ===
Title	Details
Muzika	Released: 14 May 2023; Label: Ruka Hore

=== Singles ===
Title	Year	Peak chart positions							Album or EP
Title	Year	CZE Dig.	CZE Air.	CZE Dom. Air.	FIN	LTU	SWE	SVK Dig.	Album or EP
"Světlonoš" (featuring Terezie Kovalová)	2017	—	—	—	—	—	—	—	Pátá bohyně
"Kytička"	2018	—	—	—	—	—	—	—	Pátá bohyně
"Láska z Kateřinic" (featuring Vojtěch Dyk)	2018	—	—	—	—	—	—	—	Pátá bohyně
"Bílá laň" (featuring Věra Martinová)	2019	—	—	—	—	—	—	—	Anima
"Nezapomeň"	2019	—	—	41	—	—	—	—	Anima
"Voda"	2020	—	—	—	—	—	—	—	Anima
"Downside"	2020	—	—	—	—	—	—	—	Non-album single
"Na dračích perutích"	2020	—	—	33	—	—	—	—	Anima
"Vlčí oči"	2020	—	—	—	—	—	—	—	Anima
"Vse stoji (Ne dojamem)"	2021	—	—	—	—	—	—	—	Non-album single
"Pomiluj mě"	2022	—	—	—	—	—	—	—	Muzika Slavica
"Love Me"	2022	—	—	—	—	—	—	—	Non-album single
"My Sister's Crown"	2023	15	—	—	21	17	86	—	Muzika Slavica
"Hej mami"	2023	—	—	—	—	—	—	—	Muzika Slavica
"Wolfrunners"	2023	—	—	—	—	—	—	—	Muzika Slavica
"Moravo" (with Ego)	2024	12	15	5	—	—	—	95	Lidová
"The Silence & The Storm" (with Lor)	2025	—	—	—	—	—	—	—	Non-album singles
"She Dances with the Sun" (with Tautumeitas)	2025	—	—	—	—	—	—	—	Non-album singles
"—" denotes a recording that did not chart or was not released in that territory.

Awards and achievements
Preceded by We Are Domi with "Lights Off"	Czech Republic in the Eurovision Song Contest; 2023	Succeeded by Aiko with "Pedestal"
