= Czech Republic in the Eurovision Song Contest 2023 =

- Eurovision Song Contest 2023
- Participating broadcaster: Czech Television (ČT)
- Country: Czech Republic
- Selection process: ESCZ 2023
- Selection date: 7 February 2023

Competing entry
- Song: "My Sister's Crown"
- Artist: Vesna
- Songwriters: Adam Albrecht; Michal Jiráň; Patricie Kaňok Fuxová; Šimon Martínek; Tanita Yankova; Kateryna Vatchenko

Placement
- Semi-final result: Qualified (4th, 110 points)
- Final result: 10th, 129 points

Participation chronology

The Czech Republic, presented for the first time as Czechia, was represented at the Eurovision Song Contest 2023 with the song "My Sister's Crown" performed by the band Vesna. The Czech broadcaster Česká televize (ČT) organised the national final ESCZ 2023 in order to select the Czech entry for the 2023 contest. Five entries competed in the national final and "My Sister's Crown" performed by Vesna was announced as the winner on 7 February 2023 following the combination of an international public vote and a Czech public vote.

Czechia was drawn to compete in the first semi-final of the Eurovision Song Contest which took place on 9 May 2023. Performing during the show in position 13, "My Sister's Crown" was announced among the top 10 entries of the first semi-final and therefore qualified to compete in the final on 13 May. It was later revealed that Czechia placed fourth out of the 15 participating countries in the semi-final with 110 points. In the final, Czechia performed in position 14 and placed tenth out of the 26 participating countries, scoring 129 points.

== Background ==
Prior to the 2023 contest, Czechia has participated in the Eurovision Song Contest ten times since its first entry in 2007. The nation competed in the contest on three consecutive occasions between 2007 and 2009 without qualifying to the final. After Gipsy.cz performing the song "Aven Romale" placed 18th (last) in their semi-final in 2009, failing to score any points, the Czech broadcaster withdrew from the contest between 2010 and 2014, citing low viewing figures and poor results as reasons for their absence. Since returning to the contest in 2015 and qualifying to the final for the first time in 2016, Czechia has featured in four finals. In 2022, the country qualified for the final with the song "Lights Off" performed by We Are Domi, placing 22nd with 38 points.

The Czech national broadcaster, Česká televize (ČT) broadcasts the event within Czechia and organizes the selection process for the nation's entry. The broadcaster has used both national finals and internal selections to select the Czech Eurovision entries in the past. ČT confirmed their intention to participate at the 2023 Eurovision Song Contest in October 2022. The broadcaster later confirmed that the Czech entry for the 2023 contest would be selected through a national final that would be broadcast live. This marked the first time in 15 years that ČT organised a live show in order to determine their participant.

== Before Eurovision ==
=== ESCZ 2023 ===
ESCZ 2023 was the national final organised by ČT in order to select the Czech entry for the Eurovision Song Contest 2023. Five entries participated in the competition which took place between 30 January 2023 and 6 February 2023, with the winner being selected entirely via a public vote and announced on 7 February 2023.

==== Competing entries ====
Artists and composers were able to submit their proposals to the broadcaster between 2 November 2022 and 8 December 2022. Artists were required to have Czech citizenship and for groups of a maximum of six members, at least one of the lead vocalists were required to have Czech citizenship. Songwriters of any nationality were able to submit songs. The broadcaster received over 170 submissions at the closing of the deadline, most of them which were written by Czech songwriters. ČT selected five entries for the national final from the submissions received, which were announced on 16 January 2023.

Artist	Song	Songwriter(s)
Maella	"Flood"	Michaela Charvátová
Markéta Irglová	"Happy"	Markéta Irglová
Pam Rabbit	"Ghosting"	Filip Vlček, Pamela Narimanian
Rodan	"Introvert Party Club"	Rodan Tuka, Jan Vávra, Joe Dolman, Jeppe Engelbrecht Appel
Vesna	"My Sister's Crown"	Adam Albrecht, Michal Jiráň, Patricie Kaňok Fuxová, Šimon Martínek, Tanita Yankova, Kateryna Vatchenko

==== Final ====
The five competing entries were performed live during a special programme which took place on 30 January 2023 at the Kavčí Hory television centre in Prague, hosted by Adam Mišík and broadcast online via ČT's streaming platform iVysílání as well as the official Eurovision Song Contest's YouTube channel. The winner was determined by the combination of votes from an international public vote (70%) and a Czech public vote (30%), and both international and Czech users were able to vote via the official Eurovision Song Contest application until 6 February 2023. The winner, "My Sister's Crown" performed by Vesna, was announced during a press conference that took place on 7 February 2023 at the Meeting Hub Opero in Prague.

R/O	Artist	Song	Public vote			Place
R/O	Artist	Song	Czech	Intl.	Total	Place
1	Maella	"Flood"	95	504	599	5
2	Pam Rabbit	"Ghosting"	1,417	2,799	4,216	2
3	Markéta Irglová	"Happy"	184	825	1,009	4
4	Vesna	"My Sister's Crown"	3,501	7,083	10,584	1
5	Rodan	"Introvert Party Club"	501	1,494	1,995	3

=== Promotion ===
Vesna made several appearances across Europe to specifically promote "My Sister's Crown" as the Czech Eurovision entry. On 1 April, Vesna performed during the Polish Eurovision Party, which was held at the Praga Centrum in Warsaw, Poland and hosted by Poli Genova and Konrad Zemlik. Between 2 and 4 April, the band took part in promotional activities in Tel Aviv, Israel and performed during the Israel Calling event held at Hangar 11 of the Tel Aviv Port. On 8 April, the band performed during the PrePartyES event, which was held at the Sala La Riviera venue in Madrid, Spain and hosted by Victor Escudero, SuRie and Ruslana. On 15 April, Vesna performed during the Eurovision in Concert event which was held at the AFAS Live venue in Amsterdam, Netherlands and hosted by Cornald Maas and Hila Noorzai. On 16 April, the band performed the London Eurovision Party, which was held at the Here at Outernet venue in London, United Kingdom and hosted by Nicki French and Paddy O'Connell.

== At Eurovision ==
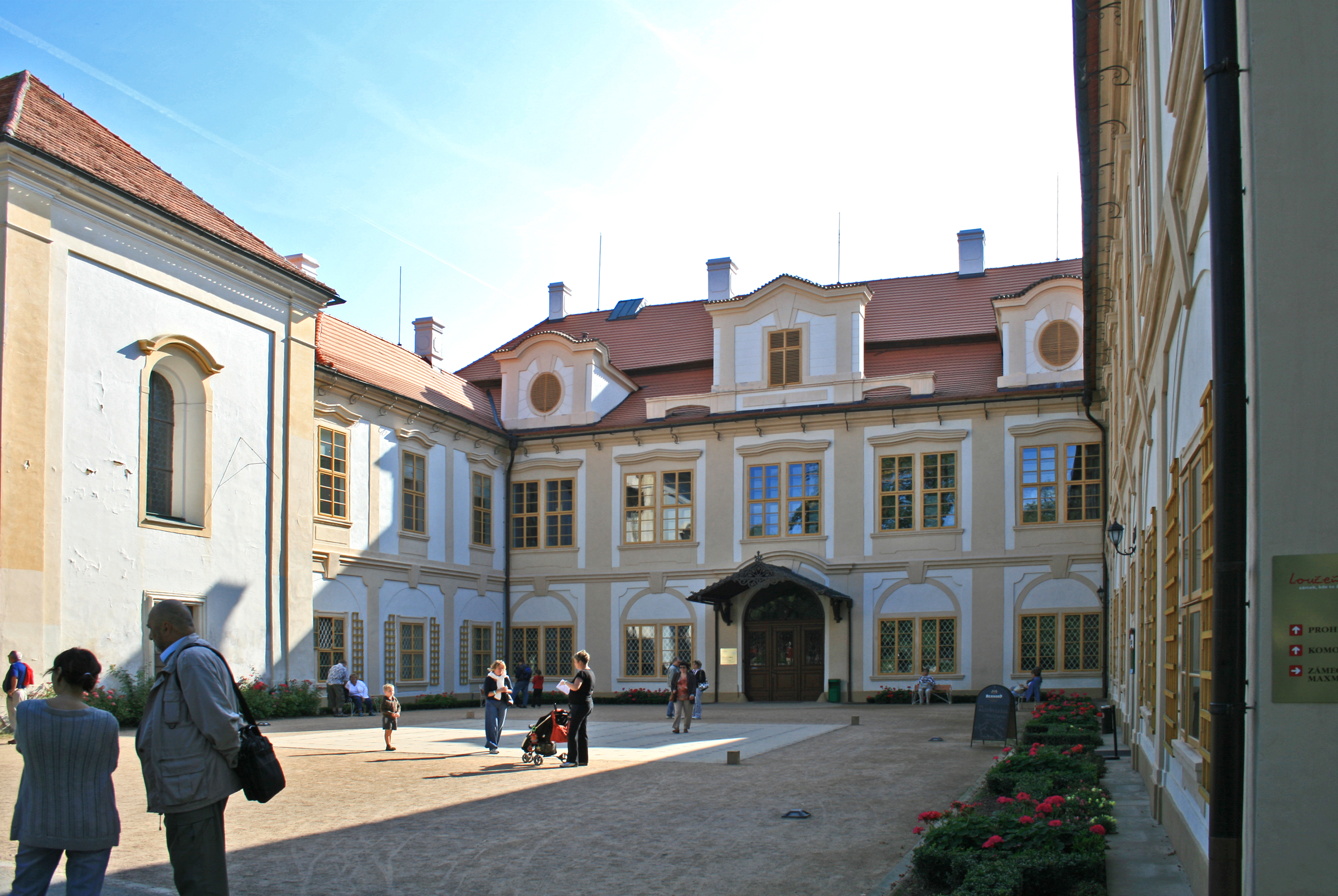
A video postcard introduced Vesna's performance in the first semi-final of the Eurovision Song Contest 2023. The postcard was filmed at the Yew Maze of the Loučeň Castle in March 2023 in collaboration with the host broadcaster BBC. The Peace Maze in Castlewellan and the Green Maze in Zhytomyr also featured in the Czech postcard.

According to Eurovision rules, all nations with the exceptions of the reigning champion nation (Ukraine) and the "Big Five" (France, Germany, Italy, Spain and the United Kingdom) are required to qualify from one of two semi-finals in order to compete for the final; the top ten countries from each semi-final progress to the final. The European Broadcasting Union (EBU) split up the competing countries into six different pots based on voting patterns from previous contests, with countries with favourable voting histories put into the same pot. On 31 January 2023, an allocation draw was held, which placed each country into one of the two semi-finals, and determined which half of the show they would perform in. Czechia has been placed into the first semi-final, to be held on 9 May 2023, and has been scheduled to perform in the second half of the show.

Once all the competing songs for the 2023 contest had been released, the running order for the semi-finals was decided by the shows' producers rather than through another draw, so that similar songs were not placed next to each other. Czechia was set to perform in position 13, following the entry from Azerbaijan and before the entry from the Netherlands.

All shows were broadcast in Czechia on ČT2 and featured commentary by Jan Maxián. The Czech spokesperson, who announced the top 12-point score awarded by the Czech jury during the final, was Radka Rosická.

=== Semi-final ===
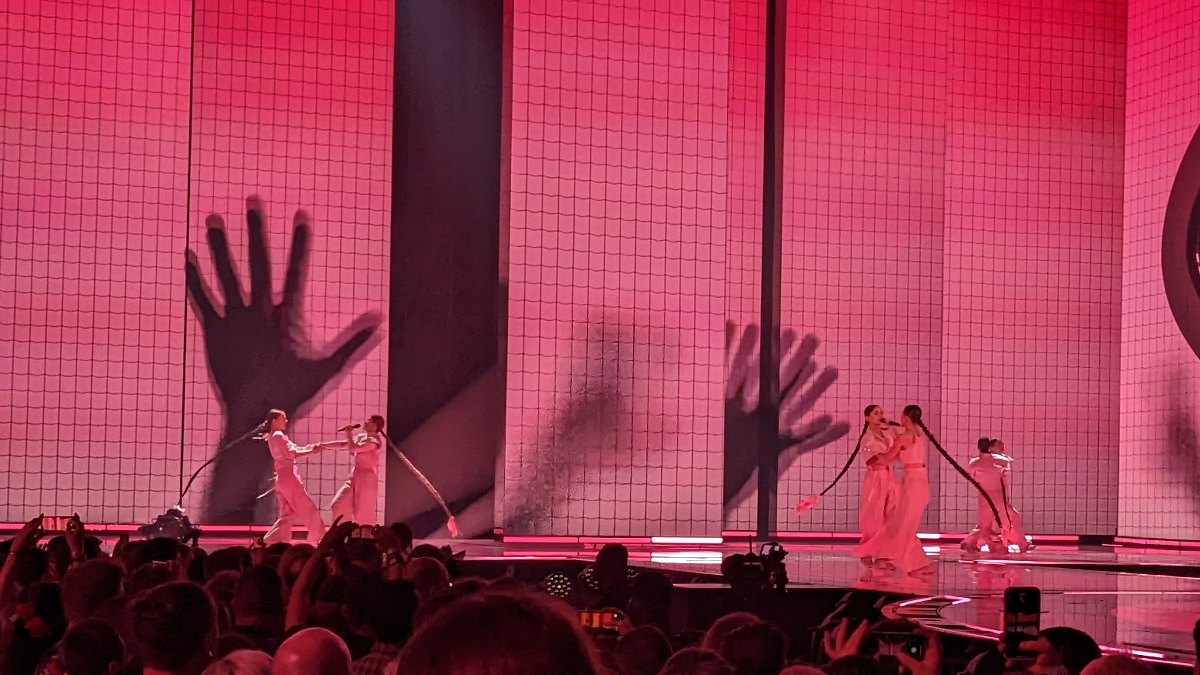
Vesna during a rehearsal before the first semi-final

Vesna took part in technical rehearsals on 1 and 3 May, followed by dress rehearsals on 8 and 9 May. This included the jury show on 8 May where the professional back-up juries of each country watched and voted in a result used if any issues with public televoting occurred.

The Czech performance featured the members of Vesna appearing on stage in long braided hair and wearing matching pale pink jumpsuits with a grey tassle. The stage colours transitioned between pale pink, white and black and the LED screens displayed the lyrics of the song, clips of the band members and hands reaching and banging. During the second chorus, the band members marched in a line to the satellite stage before forming a circle for the bridge with a light swirling around them. The art director for the performance was Matyáš Vorda and the stage director was Vítek Bělohradský.

At the end of the show, Czechia was announced as having finished in the top 10 and subsequently qualifying for the grand final. It was later revealed that the Czechia placed fourth in the semi-final, receiving a total of 110 points.

=== Final ===
Shortly after the first semi-final, a winners' press conference was held for the ten qualifying countries. As part of this press conference, the qualifying artists took part in a draw to determine which half of the grand final they would subsequently participate in. This draw was done in the order the countries appeared in the semi-final running order. Czechia was drawn to compete in the second half. Following this draw, the shows' producers decided upon the running order of the final, as they had done for the semi-finals. Czechia was subsequently placed to perform in position 14, before the entry from Finland and before the entry from Australia.

Vesna once again took part in dress rehearsals on 12 and 13 May before the final, including the jury final where the professional juries cast their final votes before the live show. The band performed a repeat of their semi-final performance during the final on 14 May. Czechia placed tenth in the final, scoring 129 points: 35 points from the televoting and 94 points from the juries.

=== Voting ===
Voting during the three shows involved each country awarding sets of points from 1–8, 10 and 12: one from their professional jury and the other from televoting in the final vote, while the semi-final vote was based entirely on the vote of the public. Each nation's jury consisted of five music industry professionals who are citizens of the country they represent. This jury judged each entry based on: vocal capacity; the stage performance; the song's composition and originality; and the overall impression by the act. In addition, each member of a national jury may only take part in the panel once every three years, and no jury was permitted to discuss of their vote with other members or be related in any way to any of the competing acts in such a way that they cannot vote impartially and independently. The individual rankings of each jury member in an anonymised form as well as the nation's televoting results were released shortly after the grand final.

Below is a breakdown of points awarded to Czechia and awarded by Czechia in the first semi-final and grand final of the contest, and the breakdown of the jury voting and televoting conducted during the two shows:

==== Points awarded to Czechia ====
Points awarded to Czechia (Semi-final 1)
Score	Televote
12 points	Finland
10 points	
8 points	Croatia; Israel; Italy; Serbia
7 points	Germany; Norway; Sweden
6 points	Netherlands; Portugal
5 points	Azerbaijan; Latvia; Moldova; Rest of the World
4 points	France; Switzerland
3 points	Ireland
2 points	Malta
1 point	

Points awarded to Czechia (Final)
Score	Televote	Jury
12 points		Switzerland
10 points	Finland	
8 points		Finland; Netherlands
7 points		Italy; Portugal; Ukraine
6 points		Iceland; Slovenia
5 points		Austria; Germany
4 points	Serbia	France; Israel; Norway
3 points	Azerbaijan; Croatia; Poland; Sweden	Belgium; Ireland; Sweden
2 points	Israel; Italy; Ukraine	
1 point	Greece; Latvia; Moldova	Cyprus; Serbia

==== Points awarded by Czechia ====
Points awarded by Czechia (Semi-final)
Score	Televote
12 points	Israel
10 points	Norway
8 points	Finland
7 points	Moldova
6 points	Sweden
5 points	Switzerland
4 points	Croatia
3 points	Serbia
2 points	Portugal
1 point	Latvia

Points awarded by Czechia (Final)
Score	Televote	Jury
12 points	Ukraine	Ukraine
10 points	Finland	Sweden
8 points	Israel	Armenia
7 points	Norway	Australia
6 points	Sweden	Slovenia
5 points	Moldova	Finland
4 points	Croatia	Italy
3 points	Slovenia	Spain
2 points	Armenia	Estonia
1 point	Italy	Germany

==== Detailed voting results ====
The following members comprised the Czech jury:

- Lukáš Chromek
- Miloš Dvořáček
- Ana Maria de Almeida
- Elizabeth Kopecká
- Kateřina Králová

Detailed voting results from Czechia (Semi-final 1)
R/O	Country	Televote	
R/O	Country	Rank	Points
01	Norway	2	10
02	Malta	12	
03	Serbia	8	3
04	Latvia	10	1
05	Portugal	9	2
06	Ireland	13	
07	Croatia	7	4
08	Switzerland	6	5
09	Israel	1	12
10	Moldova	4	7
11	Sweden	5	6
12	Azerbaijan	11	
13	Czech Republic		
14	Netherlands	14	
15	Finland	3	8

Detailed voting results from Czechia (Final)
R/O	Country	Jury							Televote	
R/O	Country	Juror 1	Juror 2	Juror 3	Juror 4	Juror 5	Rank	Points	Rank	Points
01	Austria	14	15	24	12	4	12		13	
02	Portugal	16	12	14	17	16	20		24	
03	Switzerland	18	9	10	16	14	16		14	
04	Poland	25	21	8	10	20	19		11	
05	Serbia	17	20	19	22	23	22		16	
06	France	20	16	25	23	22	23		15	
07	Cyprus	10	11	6	13	25	14		18	
08	Spain	5	8	22	6	10	8	3	23	
09	Sweden	1	2	2	11	5	2	10	5	6
10	Albania	4	19	21	14	11	13		21	
11	Italy	22	4	4	7	21	7	4	10	1
12	Estonia	7	13	16	5	12	9	2	17	
13	Finland	24	25	3	3	6	6	5	2	10
14	Czech Republic									
15	Australia	2	5	5	21	3	4	7	22	
16	Belgium	12	14	9	19	15	18		20	
17	Armenia	3	3	11	4	1	3	8	9	2
18	Moldova	19	18	20	24	24	25		6	5
19	Ukraine	8	1	1	1	7	1	12	1	12
20	Norway	21	17	13	20	17	21		4	7
21	Germany	15	24	12	25	2	10	1	12	
22	Lithuania	6	10	15	15	13	15		19	
23	Israel	11	6	17	9	9	11		3	8
24	Slovenia	13	7	7	2	8	5	6	8	3
25	Croatia	9	23	18	8	19	17		7	4
26	United Kingdom	23	22	23	18	18	24		25	
