= My Sister's Crown =

2023 single by Vesna

Single by Vesna

from the album Muzika Slavica
- Language: English, Czech, Ukrainian, Bulgarian
- Released: 30 January 2023
- Length: 2:56
- Songwriters: Adam Albrecht; Michal Jiráň; Patricie Kaňok Fuxová; Šimon Martínek; Tanita Yankova; Kateryna Vatchenko

Vesna singles chronology
| "Love Me" (2022) | "My Sister's Crown" (2023) |

Music video
- "My Sister's Crown" on YouTube

Eurovision Song Contest 2023 entry
- Country: Czech Republic
- Artist: Vesna
- Composers: Adam Albrecht; Michal Jiráň; Patricie Kaňok Fuxová; Šimon Martínek; Tanita Yankova
- Lyricists: Patricie Kaňok Fuxová; Tanita Yankova; Kateryna Vatchenko

Finals performance
- Semi-final result: 4th
- Semi-final points: 110
- Final result: 10th
- Final points: 129

Entry chronology
- ◄ "Lights Off" (2022)
- "Pedestal" (2024) ►

Official performance video
- "My Sister's Crown" (First Semi-Final) on YouTube "My Sister's Crown" (Grand Final) on YouTube

"My Sister's Crown" is a song by Czech folk band Vesna, released on 30 January 2023. Described as a feminist anthem, it represented Czech Republic in the Eurovision Song Contest 2023 after winning ESCZ 2023. The song finished tenth in the final with 129 points. After the contest, it reached the charts in Finland, the Czech Republic, Greece, Iceland, Lithuania, Poland, the Netherlands, Sweden, and the United Kingdom.

== Background ==
In an interview with Eurovision fansite ESC Bubble, members of Vesna stated that the band's lead singer and songwriter, Patricie Kaňok Fuxová, wanted to share a story of sisterhood and protest gender inequality with the song saying, "you can have support from other people and [on the subject of] equality, it's not just between women, but [everyone]".

"The song is about all people who are experiencing some kind of unfreedom, as oppression from society, trends, technology, and it's such a symbol for these people to put on a crown and feel strong enough," said Bára Šutková, the band's violinist, to Radio Prague. During Vesna's performance at Eurovision, a Violence at Home Signal for Help was shown.

The song is performed in four languages: English, Czech, Ukrainian, and Bulgarian. In an interview with Radio Prague, the band said this was done to reflect the diversity of its members, as well as to sympathise with Ukraine, who won the Eurovision Song Contest 2022 and on whose behalf the 2023 contest was being organised, amidst the Russian invasion. Due to this, the song and music video were banned in Russia and Belarus.

== Eurovision Song Contest ==
=== ESCZ 2023 ===
ESCZ 2023 was the national final organized by ČT in order to select the Czech entry for the Eurovision Song Contest 2023. Five entries participated in the competition which took place on 30 January 2023 at the Kavčí Hory television centre in Prague, with the winner being selected via public voting and announced on 7 February 2023, with voting taking place in between. The voting consisted of 70% international audiences and 30% Czech audiences.

In the voting, "My Sister's Crown" earned 3,501 votes from the Czech vote and 7,083 votes from the international vote, earning a total of 10,584 votes, winning by a margin of 6,367 votes. With the victory, the song was selected as the Czech representative for the Eurovision Song Contest 2023.

=== At Eurovision ===
According to Eurovision rules, all nations with the exceptions of the host country and the "Big Five" (France, Germany, Italy, Spain and the United Kingdom) are required to qualify from one of two semi-finals in order to compete for the final; the top ten countries from each semi-final progress to the final. The European Broadcasting Union (EBU) split up the competing countries into six different pots based on voting patterns from previous contests, with countries with favourable voting histories put into the same pot. On 31 January 2023, an allocation draw was held which placed each country into one of the two semi-finals, as well as which half of the show they would perform in. Czech Republic was placed into the first semi-final, held on 9 May 2023, and performed in the second half of the show.

== Charts ==
Chart performance for "My Sister's Crown"
| Chart (2023) | Peak position |
|---|---|
| Czech Republic Singles Digital (ČNS IFPI) | 15 |
| Finland (Suomen virallinen lista) | 21 |
| Greece International (IFPI) | 38 |
| Iceland (Tónlistinn) | 17 |
| Lithuania (AGATA) | 17 |
| Netherlands (Single Tip) | 20 |
| Poland (Polish Streaming Top 100) | 64 |
| Sweden (Sverigetopplistan) | 86 |
| UK Singles Downloads (Official Charts) | 64 |
