= Eurovision Song Contest 2023 =

International song competition

- United by Music

Dates and venue
- Semi-final 1: 9 May 2023
- Semi-final 2: 11 May 2023
- Final: 13 May 2023
- Venue: M&S Bank Arena Liverpool; Liverpool, United Kingdom

Organisation
- Organiser: European Broadcasting Union (EBU)
- Executive supervisor: Martin Österdahl

Production
- Host broadcaster: British Broadcasting Corporation (BBC)
- Directors: Nikki Parsons; Richard Valentine; Ollie Bartlett
- Executive producer: Andrew Cartmell
- Presenters: Alesha Dixon; Hannah Waddingham; Julia Sanina; Graham Norton (final)

Participants
- Number of entries: 37
- Number of finalists: 26
- Non-returning countries: Bulgaria; Montenegro; North Macedonia
- Participation map: Finalist countries Countries eliminated in the semi-finals Countries that participated in the past but not in 2023

Vote
- Voting system: Each country awards one set in the semi-finals, or two sets in the final of 12, 10, 8–1 points to ten songs. In all three shows, online votes from viewers in non-participating countries are aggregated and awarded as one set of points.
- Winning song: Sweden "Tattoo"

The Eurovision Song Contest 2023 was the 67th edition of the Eurovision Song Contest. It consisted of two semi-finals on 9 and 11 May and a final on 13 May 2023, held at M&S Bank Arena Liverpool in Liverpool, United Kingdom, and presented by Alesha Dixon, Hannah Waddingham, and Julia Sanina, with Graham Norton joining for the final. It was organised by the European Broadcasting Union (EBU) and host broadcaster the British Broadcasting Corporation (BBC), which staged the event on behalf of the Public Broadcasting Company of Ukraine (UA:PBC), which had won the 2022 contest for Ukraine with the song "Stefania" by Kalush Orchestra but was unable to stage the event due to the Russian invasion of the country.

Broadcasters from thirty-seven countries participated in the contest, three fewer than in 2022. Bulgaria, Montenegro, and North Macedonia opted not to participate, primarily due to the economic impact of the 2021–2023 global energy crisis.

The winner was Sweden with the song "Tattoo", performed by Loreen and written by her with Jimmy Thörnfeldt, Jimmy Jansson, Moa Carlebecker, Peter Boström, and Thomas G:son. Finland, Israel, Italy, and Norway completed the top five. Sweden won the combined vote and jury vote, and finished second to Finland in the televote. Loreen became the second performer to win the contest twice, after Irish singer Johnny Logan; it was also the seventh win for Sweden, tying Ireland's record for the most Eurovision victories.

The EBU reported that the contest had a television audience of 162 million viewers in 38 European markets, an increase of a million viewers from the previous edition. A total of 15.6 million viewers watched the contest online on YouTube and TikTok. The broadcast of the contest won the British Academy Television Award for Best Live Event, and Waddingham received a British Academy Television Award for Best Entertainment Performance nomination for her role as a co-presenter.

== Location ==
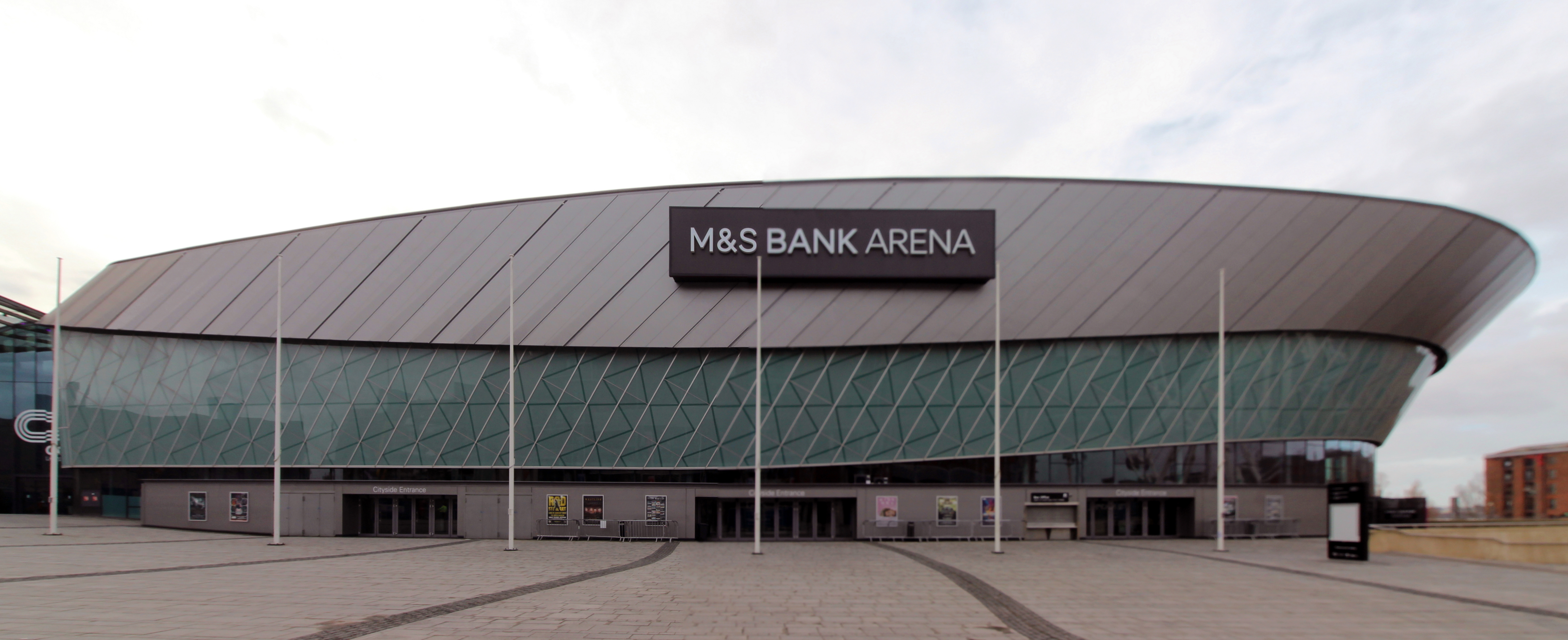
M&S Bank Arena Liverpool – host venue of the 2023 contest

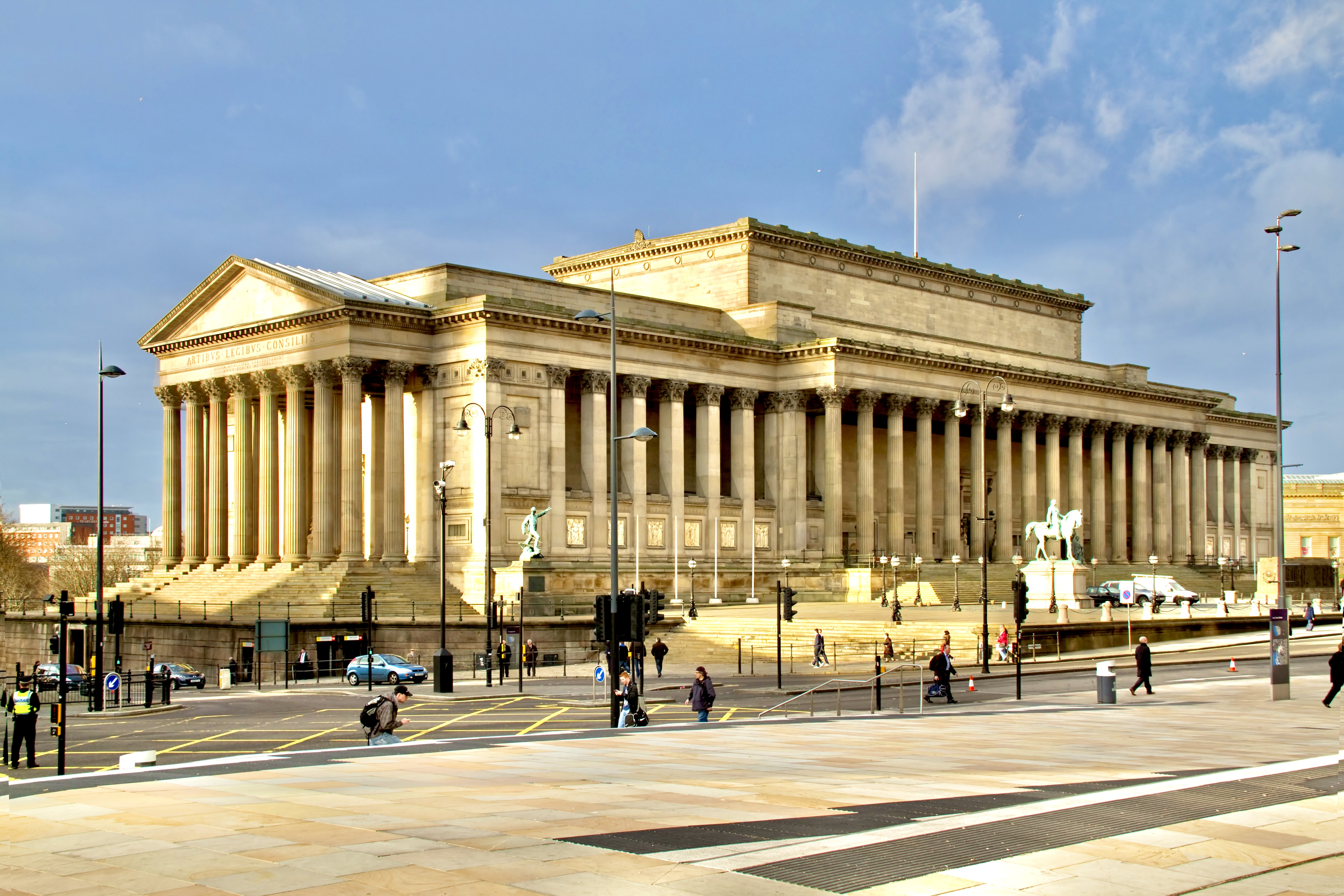
St George's Hall – host venue for the allocation draw and the opening ceremony of the 2023 contest

Location of host venue (red) and other contest-related sites and events (blue)

The 2023 contest was held in Liverpool, United Kingdom. It was the ninth time that the United Kingdom had hosted the contest, having previously done so in 1960, 1963, 1968, 1972, 1974, 1977, 1982, and 1998. The selected venue was the 11,000-seat M&S Bank Arena Liverpool a multi-purpose indoor arena located in the ACC Liverpool complex. The "Turquoise Carpet" event, where the contestants and their delegations were presented before accredited press and fans, took place outside the Walker Art Gallery on 7 May 2023, followed by the Opening Ceremony at St George's Hall.

In conjunction with the contest, Liverpool held a cultural festival called "EuroFest", which featured collaborations between British and Ukrainian artists. The Pier Head was the location of the Eurovision Village, where a stage hosted performances by Ukrainian artists, local artists, current and previous Eurovision entrants, and other groups. It also held screenings of the three live shows. Entry to the Village was free of charge except during the final. The EuroClub, which took place at Camp and Furnace, hosted the official after-parties and private performances by contest participants.

=== Host country selection ===
The 2022 contest was won by Ukraine with the song "Stefania" by Kalush Orchestra, which, according to Eurovision tradition, made Ukraine the presumptive host of the 2023 contest. The country had hosted the contest twice before, in 2005 and 2017, both times in Kyiv. Between May and June 2022, the Ukrainian government and UA:PBC, the nation's public broadcaster, discussed hosting the contest with the EBU. The chairman of UA:PBC, Mykola Chernotytskyi, Ukrainian president Volodymyr Zelenskyy, and other Ukrainian politicians expressed their willingness to host the event, and an organising committee was formed.

Despite this, the EBU announced on 17 June 2022 that the Russian invasion of Ukraine meant that UA:PBC could not give the security and operations guarantees required to host the contest, and that the event could therefore not be held in Ukraine. The EBU then entered discussions with the BBC, the 2022 runner-up, and on 25 July announced that the 2023 contest would be hosted in the United Kingdom. It was the first time since 1980 that the contest was not hosted by the previous edition's winning country.

The decision not to host in Ukraine was initially met with disappointment. UA:PBC published a statement in which Chernotytskyi requested further talks with the EBU, and Oleh Psiuk of Kalush Orchestra published an open letter criticising the decision, co-signed by Ukraine's previous Eurovision winners, Ruslana and Jamala, as well as Ukraine's minister of culture Oleksandr Tkachenko. This stance was supported by Boris Johnson, who was the British prime minister at the time, Nadine Dorries, who was the British culture secretary at the time, the Polish broadcaster Telewizja Polska, and Poland's deputy prime minister and minister of culture Piotr Gliński. The announcement on 25 July that the BBC would host the contest was supported by UA:PBC.

=== Host city bidding phase ===
Location of host city Liverpool (in blue), shortlisted city Glasgow (in yellow), longlisted cities (in green), other bidding cities (in red) and cities and towns that expressed interest but ultimately did not bid (in grey)

The host city bidding process ran from 25 July to 7 October 2022, with candidates judged against a set of criteria to demonstrate that they could host an event on the scale of the Eurovision Song Contest. During the first stage of the process, the BBC received expressions of interest from 20 UK cities and towns, seven of which were longlisted on 12 August 2022: Birmingham, Glasgow, Leeds, Liverpool, Manchester, Newcastle, and Sheffield. These cities had until 8 September to develop their bids in detail for evaluation by the BBC, which also conducted visits to the cities throughout the month. On 27 September, Glasgow and Liverpool were announced to have made the shortlist, and on 7 October, the EBU and the BBC announced Liverpool as the host city.

Key:
† Host city ‡ Shortlisted * Longlisted ^ Submitted a bid

City/town	Venue	Notes	Ref.
Aberdeen ^	P&J Live Aberdeen	—	
Belfast ^	SSE Arena Belfast	—	
Birmingham *	Resorts World Arena Birmingham	Supported by Birmingham City Council	
Brighton	—	Withdrew its proposal on 11 August 2022, citing lack of required infrastructure and venue	
Bristol ^	YTL Arena Bristol	—	
Cardiff	Millennium Stadium	Withdrew its proposal on 3 August 2022, citing unavailability of the proposed venue	
Darlington ^	The Darlington Arena	Proposal was dependent on the construction of a roof to cover the arena; supported by Darlington Borough Council and Tees Valley Combined Authority	
Derry	—	Withdrew its proposal on 8 August 2022, citing lack of a suitable venue and supporting accommodation infrastructure	
Edinburgh ^	—	Supported by Edinburgh City Council	
Glasgow ‡	OVO Hydro	Supported by Glasgow City Council	
Leeds *	First Direct Arena Leeds	Supported by Leeds City Council	
Liverpool †	M&S Bank Arena Liverpool	Supported by Liverpool City Council	
London ^	—	London met the criteria but was not longlisted, as the BBC and the British government aimed to "move events and opportunities outside the capital".	
Manchester *	AO Arena Manchester	Supported by Manchester City Council	
Newcastle *	Utilita Arena Newcastle	Supported by Newcastle City Council	
Nottingham	Motorpoint Arena Nottingham	Withdrew its proposal on 9 August 2022, citing the proposed venue's incapability to meet EBU requirements	
Sheffield *	Utilita Arena Sheffield	Supported by Sheffield City Council and South Yorkshire Mayoral Combined Authority	
Sunderland	Stadium of Light	Withdrew its proposal on 10 August 2022, citing unavailability of the proposed venue	
Wolverhampton	—	—	

== Participants ==
Eurovision Song Contest 2023 – Participation summaries by country
- Albania; Armenia; Australia; Austria; Azerbaijan; Belgium; Croatia; Cyprus; Czechia; Denmark; Estonia; Finland; France; Georgia; Germany; Greece; Iceland; Ireland; Israel; Italy; Latvia; Lithuania; Malta; Moldova; Netherlands; Norway; Poland; Portugal; Romania; San Marino; Serbia; Slovenia; Spain; Sweden; Switzerland; Ukraine; United Kingdom

Eligibility for potential participation in the Eurovision Song Contest requires a national broadcaster with active EBU membership capable of receiving the contest via the Eurovision network and broadcasting it live nationwide. The EBU issued an invitation to participate in the contest to all active members. Associate member Australia did not need an invitation for the 2023 contest, as it had previously been granted permission to participate until at least this year.

On 20 October 2022, the EBU announced that 37 countries would participate in the 2023 contest – the lowest number of participating countries in a single edition since 2014 – with Bulgaria, Montenegro and North Macedonia, which had participated in the 2022 contest, deciding not to participate in 2023 due to financial reasons. This was also the first contest where the Czech Republic participated under its shortened English name of Czechia.

The contest featured four representatives who also previously performed as lead vocalists for the same country. Two of them had competed in 2012: Loreen won that year's contest representing Sweden, while Pasha Parfeni represented Moldova that year and later provided backing vocals for Moldova in 2013. Also returning as lead artists were Marco Mengoni, who had represented Italy in 2013, and Monika Linkytė, who had represented Lithuania in 2015 alongside Vaidas Baumila. In addition, Gustaph had previously provided backing vocals for Belgium in 2018 and in 2021, and Iru had won Junior Eurovision for Georgia in 2011 as a member of Candy.

Eurovision Song Contest 2023 participants
Country	Broadcaster	Artist	Song	Language	Songwriter(s)	Ref.
Albania	RTSH	Albina and Familja Kelmendi	"Duje"	Albanian	Enis Mullaj; Eriona Rushiti	
Armenia	AMPTV	Brunette	"Future Lover"	English, Armenian	Elen Yeremyan	
Australia	SBS	Voyager	"Promise"	English	Alex Canion; Ashley Doodkorte; Simone Dow; Daniel Estrin; Scott Kay	
Austria	ORF	Teya and Salena	"Who the Hell Is Edgar?"	English, Italian	Selina-Maria Edbauer; Ronald Janeček; Pele Loriano; Teodora Špirić	
Azerbaijan	İTV	TuralTuranX	"Tell Me More"	English	Nihad Aliyev; Tural Baghmanov; Turan Baghmanov; Tunar Taghiyev	
Belgium	VRT	Gustaph	"Because of You"	English	Jaouad Alloul; Stef Caers	
Croatia	HRT	Let 3	"Mama ŠČ!"	Croatian	Damir Martinović Mrle; Zoran Prodanović Prlja	
Cyprus	CyBC	Andrew Lambrou	"Break a Broken Heart"	English	Jimmy Jansson; Thomas Stengaard; Jimmy "Joker" Thörnfeldt; Marcus Winther-John	
Czechia	ČT	Vesna	"My Sister's Crown"	English, Czech, Ukrainian, Bulgarian	Adam Albrecht; Michal Jiráň; Patricie Kaňok; Šimon Martínek; Kateryna Vatchenko; Tanita Yankova	
Denmark	DR	Reiley	"Breaking My Heart"	English	Bård Bonsaksen; Sivert Hjeltnes Hagtvet; Rani Petersen; Hilda Stenmalm	
Estonia	ERR	Alika	"Bridges"	English	Alika Milova; Wouter Hardy; Nina Sampermans	
Finland	Yle	Käärijä	"Cha Cha Cha"	Finnish	Johannes Naukkarinen; Aleksi Nurmi; Jere Pöyhönen	
France	France Télévisions	La Zarra	"Évidemment"	French	Fatima-Zahra Hafdi; Yannick Rastogi; Zacharie Raymond; Ahmed Saghir	
Georgia	GPB	Iru	"Echo"	English	Beni Kadagidze; Iru Khechanovi; Giorgi Kukhianidze	
Germany	NDR (Note: On behalf of the German public broadcasting consortium ARD)	Lord of the Lost	"Blood & Glitter"	English	Anthony J. Brown; Chris Harms; Rupert Keplinger; Pi Stoffers	
Greece	ERT	Victor Vernicos	"What They Say"	English	Victor Vernicos Jørgensen	
Iceland	RÚV	Diljá	"Power"	English	Diljá Pétursdóttir; Pálmi Ragnar Ásgeirsson	
Ireland	RTÉ	Wild Youth	"We Are One"	English	Jörgen Elofsson; Conor O'Donohoe; Edward Porter	
Israel	IPBC	Noa Kirel	"Unicorn"	English	Noa Kirel; Doron Medalie; May Sfadia; Yinon Yahel	
Italy	RAI	Marco Mengoni	"Due vite"	Italian	Marco Mengoni; Davide Petrella; Davide Simonetta	
Latvia	LTV	Sudden Lights	"Aijā"	English	Kārlis Matīss Zitmanis; Mārtiņš Matīss Zemītis; Andrejs Reinis Zitmanis; Kārlis Vārtiņš	
Lithuania	LRT	Monika Linkytė	"Stay"	English	Krists Indrišonoks; Monika Linkytė	
Malta	PBS	The Busker	"Dance (Our Own Party)"	English	Matthew James Borg; Jean Paul Borg; Micheal Joe Cini; Sean Meachen; David Meilak	
Moldova	TRM	Pasha Parfeni	"Soarele și luna"	Romanian	Pasha Parfeni; Yuliana Parfeni; Cătălin Temciuc; Andrei Vulpe	
Netherlands	AVROTROS	Mia Nicolai and Dion Cooper	"Burning Daylight"	English	Dion Cuiper; Jordan Garfield; Loek van der Grinten; Duncan de Moor; Mia Nicolai	
Norway	NRK	Alessandra	"Queen of Kings"	English, Italian	Linda Dale; Stanley Ferdinandez; Alessandra Mele; Henning Olerud	
Poland	TVP	Blanka	"Solo"	English	Maria Broberg; Marcin Górecki; Maciej Puchalski; Bartłomiej Rzeczycki; Blanka Stajkow; Julia Sundberg; Mikołaj Trybulec	
Portugal	RTP	Mimicat	"Ai coração"	Portuguese	Marisa Mena; Luís Pereira	
Romania	TVR	Theodor Andrei	"D.G.T. (Off and On)"	Romanian, English	Theodor-Octavian Andrei; Luca De Mezzo; Mikail Jahed; Luca Ştefan Udăţeanu	
San Marino	SMRTV	Piqued Jacks	"Like an Animal"	English	Francesco Bini; Andrea Lazzeretti; Tommaso Oliveri; Marco Sgaramella	
Serbia	RTS	Luke Black	"Samo mi se spava" (Само ми се спава)	Serbian, English	Luka Ivanović	
Slovenia	RTVSLO	Joker Out	"Carpe Diem"	Slovene	Bojan Cvjetićanin; Kris Guštin; Nace Jordan; Jure Maček; Jan Peteh	
Spain	RTVE	Blanca Paloma	"Eaea"	Spanish	Blanca Paloma Ramos Baeza; José Pablo Polo; Álvaro Tato	
Sweden	SVT	Loreen	"Tattoo"	English	Peter Boström; Moa Carlebecker; Thomas Gustafsson; Jimmy Jansson; Lorine Talhaoui; Jimmy "Joker" Thörnfeldt	
Switzerland	SRG SSR	Remo Forrer	"Watergun"	English	Ashley Hicklin; Argyle Singh; Mikołaj Trybulec	
Ukraine	UA:PBC	Tvorchi	"Heart of Steel"	English, Ukrainian	Andrii Hutsuliak; Jimoh Augustus Kehinde	
United Kingdom	BBC	Mae Muller	"I Wrote a Song"	English	Mae Muller; Karen Poole; Lewis Thompson	

=== Other countries ===
Several EBU member broadcasters made statements confirming non-participation prior to the publication of the official 2023 participants list. The management board of Bulgarian broadcaster BNT, at a meeting on 7 September 2022, opted not to participate in the 2023 contest, citing an expected increase in participation fees; this was later publicly confirmed in several Bulgarian news outlets on 19 October. The Montenegrin broadcaster RTCG and the Macedonian broadcaster MRT also publicly confirmed on 13 and 14 October 2022 respectively that they would not participate in the contest, citing financial contraints. Both RTCG and MRT however confirmed their intentions to broadcast the 2023 contest. Active EBU member broadcasters in Andorra, Bosnia and Herzegovina, Luxembourg and Slovakia also confirmed non-participation prior to the announcement of the participants list by the EBU.

A potential return for Monaco to the contest in 2023 – in what would have been its first participation since 2006 – was first discussed in November 2021, when it was reported that part of the Monégasque state budget had been reserved for participation in the 2023 contest. However, these plans were curtailed due to the delay in the launch of a new Monégasque public television channel, TVMonaco, which commenced broadcasts in September 2023 instead of the initially outlined period of late 2022. Monaco Media Diffusion, the current EBU member broadcaster for Monaco, subsequently confirmed on 5 September 2022 that the country would not participate in the 2023 event.

Discussions were also reported between the EBU and Kazakh broadcaster Khabar Agency, an associate member of the EBU, which would have led to Kazakhstan being invited to participate in the contest for the first time. Kazakhstan has participated in the Junior Eurovision Song Contest since 2018, with television producer Zhan Mukanov stating that "there is every chance [for Kazakhstan] to enter the adult Eurovision next year" and that the country's participation in the 2022 Junior contest would have a "significant impact" on its chances of debuting in the adult event. The country, however, did not appear on the final list of participants.

== Production ==
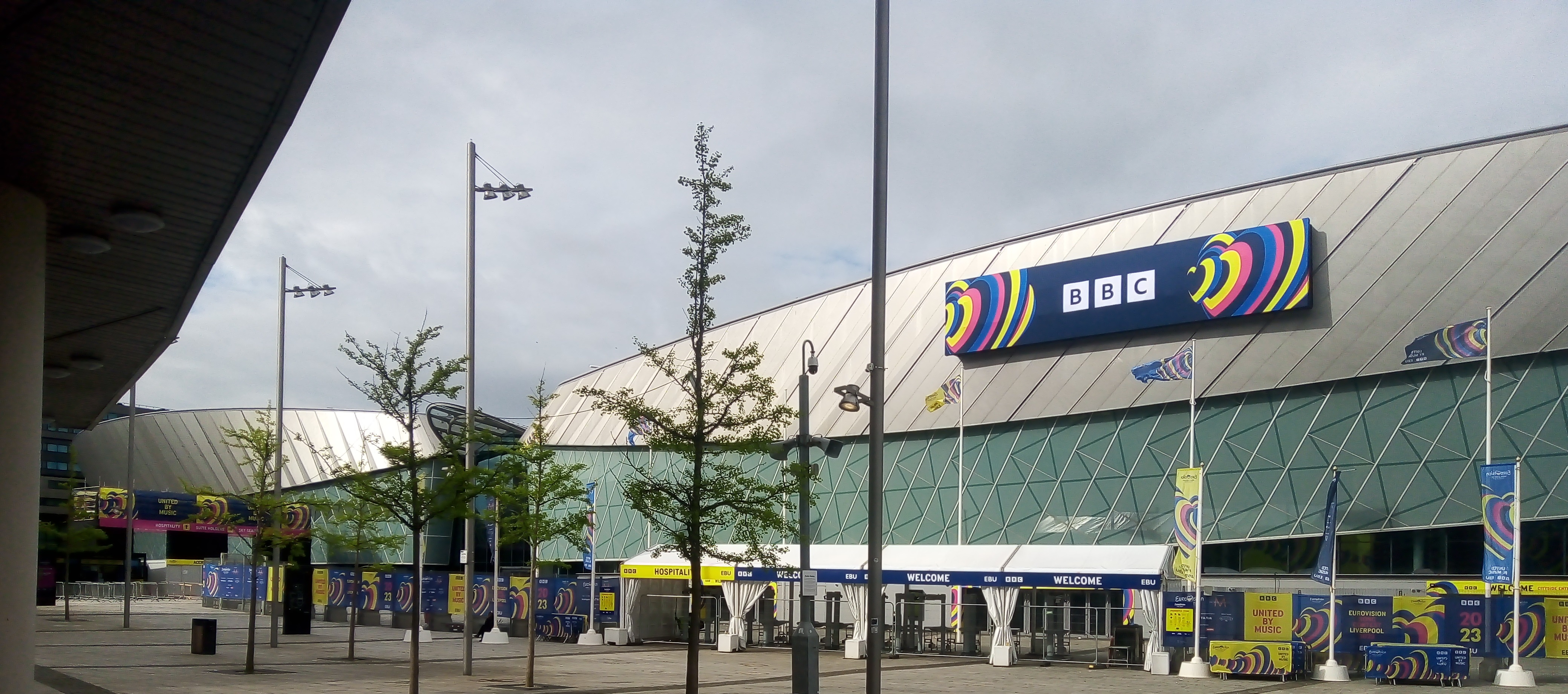
Exterior of the Liverpool Arena during the Eurovision event weeks

The Eurovision Song Contest 2023 was produced by the British national broadcaster British Broadcasting Corporation (BBC). The Ukrainian public broadcaster UA:PBC worked with the BBC to develop and implement Ukrainian elements for the live shows, including theme artwork, background music, selection of presenters, and opening and interval acts. The three shows were produced by BBC Studios Entertainment Productions and BBC Studios Music Productions, part of the BBC's commercial subsidiary BBC Studios.

The senior production team consisted of Martin Green as managing director, Rachel Ashdown as lead commissioner, Andrew Cartmell as executive producer, Lee Smithurst as head of show, Twan van de Nieuwenhuijzen as head of contest, and James O'Brien as executive in charge of production. Additional production personnel included multi-camera directors Nikki Parsons, Richard Valentine and Ollie Bartlett, lead creative director Dan Shipton, music director Kojo Samuel, stage designer Julio Himede, head of sound Robert Edwards, and lighting designer Tim Routledge. The Ukrainian consultation team was led by Oksana Skybinska, Tetiana Semenova, and Herman Nenov. Background music for the shows was composed by Mykhailo Nekrasov.

The budget was contributed to by Liverpool City Council and the Liverpool City Region Combined Authority (£2 million each), the British government (£10 million), and the BBC (£8 million to £17 million). The overall budget was not made public, but was estimated to be at around £24.7 million (€28.3 million), including expenditures by the host city.

=== Visual design ===
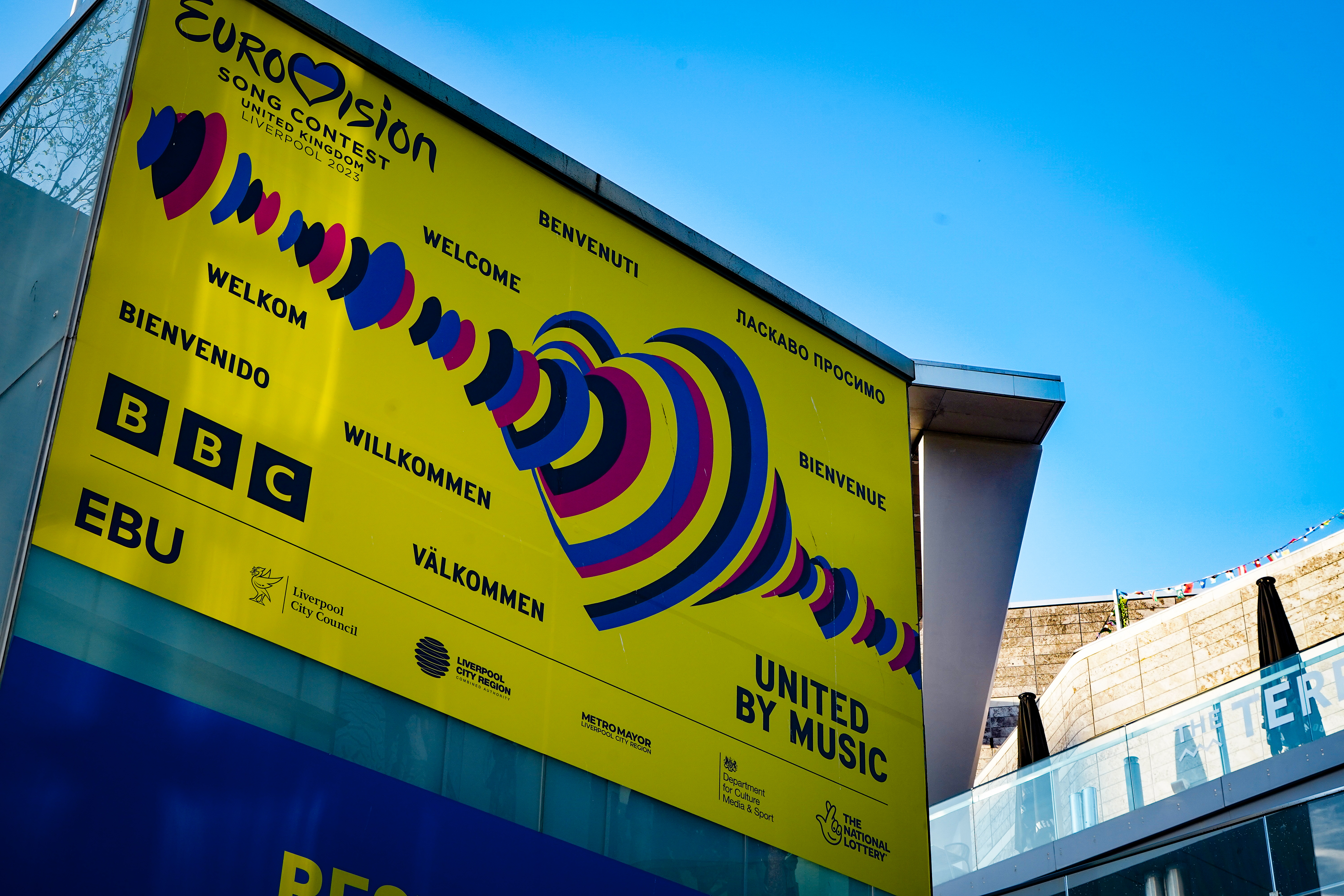
The graphic design of the 2023 contest on display in Liverpool

On 7 October 2022, along with the host city announcement, the EBU revealed the generic logo for the 2023 contest. The Eurovision heart, which typically has the flag of the host country placed in its centre, contained the Ukrainian flag for this year to reflect the country's win the previous year. The 'Song Contest' text was accompanied below by 'United Kingdom' and further down by 'Liverpool 2023'.

The theme art and slogan for the contest, "United by Music", was unveiled on 31 January 2023. Designed by London-based brand consultancy Superunion and Ukrainian production company Starlight Media, the artwork was built around a string of two-dimensional hearts resembling an electrocardiogram, representing response to rhythm and sound, while the colours were inspired by those of the Ukrainian and British flags. The typeface, Penny Lane, was inspired by 20th-century Liverpool street signs and the city's musical heritage.

=== Stage design ===
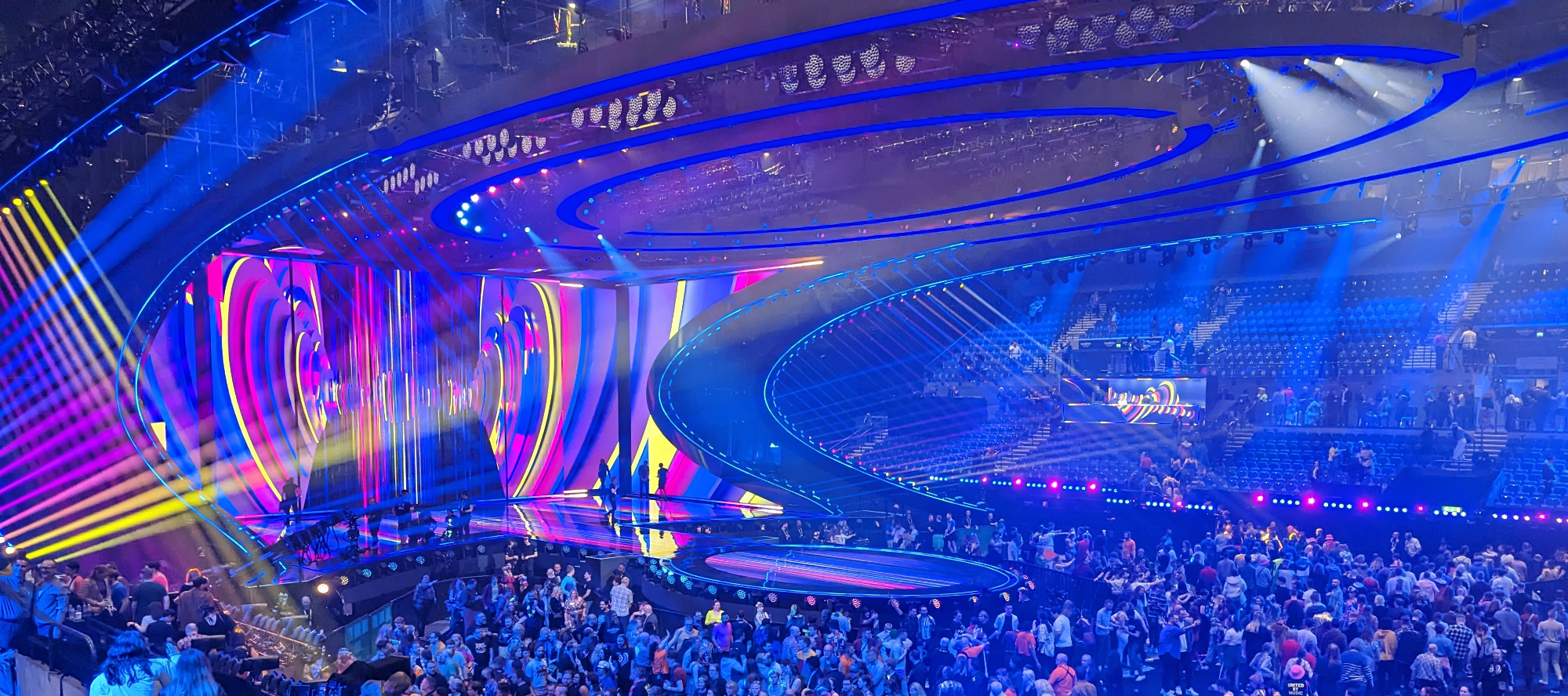
The stage in the arena

The stage design for the 2023 contest was revealed on 2 February 2023. Designed by New York-based set designer Julio Himede, the design was based on "the principles of togetherness, celebration and community", taking inspiration from a wide hug and the "cultural aspects and similarities between Ukraine, the UK and specifically Liverpool". The stage was 450 m^{2} (4,800 sq ft), with 220 m^{2} (2,400 sq ft) of independently rotating LED screens, over 700 LED floor tiles and more than 1,500 metres (4,900 ft) of LED lights. King Charles III and Queen Camilla (whose coronations were held the week before the contest) inaugurated the stage on 26 April, during an official visit to Liverpool.

=== Postcards ===
The "postcards" were 40-second video introductions shown on television whilst the stage is being prepared for the next entry. Filmed between February and April 2023 and directed by Tom Cook, with Carlo Massarella and Jane McGoldrick serving as executive producers, the postcards were based on the "United by Music" theme of the contest. Making use of 360° drone technology, each postcard began in a selected location in Ukraine, then one in the United Kingdom, before moving to the artist's country of origin, where the artist took part in an activity of their choice. The three locations appearing in each postcard were connected by a singular theme. Each postcard was bookended with the "little planet effect", which symbolised the interconnections between people. The postcards were produced by London-based production company Windfall Films and Ukrainian production company 23/32, with background music composed by Dmytro Shurov. The following locations were used for each participating country:

Postcard locations
Country	Theme	Locations		
Country	Theme	In Ukraine	In the United Kingdom	In the participating country
Albania	City parks	Sofiyivka Park, Uman	Sefton Park, Liverpool	Grand Park of Tirana
Armenia	Botanical gardens	Botanical garden, Lviv University	Eden Project, Cornwall	Yerevan Botanical Garden
Australia	Bridges	Glass Bridge, Kyiv	Clifton Suspension Bridge, Bristol	Matagarup Bridge, Perth
Austria	City halls	Lviv Town Hall	Sheffield Town Hall	Vienna City Hall
Azerbaijan	City squares	Maidan Nezalezhnosti, Kyiv	Centenary Square, Birmingham	Baku Boulevard
Belgium	Monuments	Independence Monument, Kyiv	Angel of the North, Gateshead	Atomium, Brussels
Croatia	Ports	Kyiv River Port	Whitby Harbour, North Yorkshire	Port of Rijeka
Cyprus	Beaches	Kyiv Sea beach	Brighton Beach, East Sussex	Akti Olympion Beach, Limassol
Czechia	Mazes	Green Maze, Zhytomyr	Peace Maze, Castlewellan	Yew Maze, Loučeň Castle
Denmark	Opera houses	Lviv Theatre of Opera and Ballet	Wales Millennium Centre, Cardiff	Copenhagen Opera House
Estonia	Towers	Vinnytsia water tower	Blackpool Tower, Lancashire	Tallinn TV Tower
Finland	Ferris wheels	Podil ferris wheel, Kyiv	Wheel of Liverpool	SkyWheel Helsinki
France	Palaces	Potocki Palace, Lviv	Hopetoun House, West Lothian	Palace of Fontainebleau, Seine-et-Marne
Georgia	Old towns	Old Town, Lviv	Port Sunlight, Merseyside	Old Town, Tbilisi
Germany	Canals	Rusanivka, Kyiv	Bridgewater Canal, Greater Manchester	Kehrwiederfleet Canal, Hamburg
Greece	Ruins	Tarakaniv Fort, Rivne Oblast	Dunluce Castle, County Antrim	Temple of Poseidon, Sounion
Iceland	Waterfalls	Maniava waterfall, Gorgany	Pistyll Rhaeadr, Powys	Kvernufoss, Skógar region
Ireland	Mountain roads	Mountain road in Ivano-Frankivsk Oblast	Military Road, Isle of Wight	Sally Gap, County Wicklow
Israel	Rock formations	Urytski rocks in the Skole Beskids mountain range	Stonehenge, Wiltshire	Masada, Judaean Desert
Italy	Velodromes	Kyiv Velodrome	Pump Track Wales, Rhayader	Circus Maximus, Rome
Latvia	Beach campsites	Ecospace pods, Kyiv Sea	Beach huts at Boscombe beach, Bournemouth	Melnsils, Talsi Municipality
Lithuania	Fortresses	Khotyn Fortress, Chernivtsi Oblast	Eilean Donan, Scottish Highlands	Trakai Island Castle
Malta	Buses	Lviv autobus	London red double-decker bus	Vintage bus in Mellieħa
Moldova	Forests	Skole Beskids Forest, Lviv Oblast	Sherwood Forest, Nottinghamshire	Orhei National Park, Trebujeni
Netherlands	Colourful architecture	Comfort Town, Kyiv	Portmeirion, Gwynedd	Zaandam, North Holland
Norway	Libraries	Vernadsky National Library of Ukraine	Liverpool Central Library	Oslo Public Library
Poland	Universities	Residence of Bukovinian and Dalmatian Metropolitans, Chernivtsi	Trinity College, Cambridge	Faculty of Physics, University of Warsaw
Portugal	Churches	St Sophia Cathedral, Kyiv	Ely Cathedral, Cambridgeshire	Church of Santa Engrácia, Lisbon
Romania	Statues	Taras Shevchenko statue, Lviv	The Beatles statue, Liverpool	A Carriage with Clowns sculpture, Bucharest
San Marino	Castles	Kamianets-Podilskyi Castle, Khmelnytskyi Oblast	Herstmonceux Castle, East Sussex	Guaita, Monte Titano
Serbia	Art galleries	Park3020, Lviv Oblast	Tate Liverpool	Museum of Contemporary Art, Belgrade
Slovenia	Rooftops	Tetris Hall rooftop, Kyiv	Goodness Gracious Roof Bar, Liverpool	Radio Slovenija rooftop, Ljubljana
Spain	Theatres	Amphitheater, Uzhhorod	Minack Theatre, Cornwall	Roman Theatre, Sagunto
Sweden	Islands	Anti-Circe Island, Uman	St Catherine's Island, Tenby	Enholmen, Gotland
Switzerland	Lakes	Lake Buchak, Cherkasy Oblast	Loch Ness, Scottish Highlands	Lake Zurich
Ukraine	Street murals	Street murals in Kyiv	Street murals in Belfast	Art-Zavod Platforma, Kyiv
United Kingdom	Rivers	Dnieper, Kyiv	River Mersey, Liverpool	River Thames, London

=== Vocal rules ===
For the third year in a row, delegations had the option to use pre-recorded backing vocals, though each delegation could still use live backing singers—whether on or off stage—or a combination of live and recorded backing vocals. However, all lead vocals and lead dubs performing the melody of the song must still be live. The contest's executive supervisor Martin Österdahl later stated that the use of pre-recorded backing vocals would continue to be permitted for the foreseeable future.

=== Presenters ===
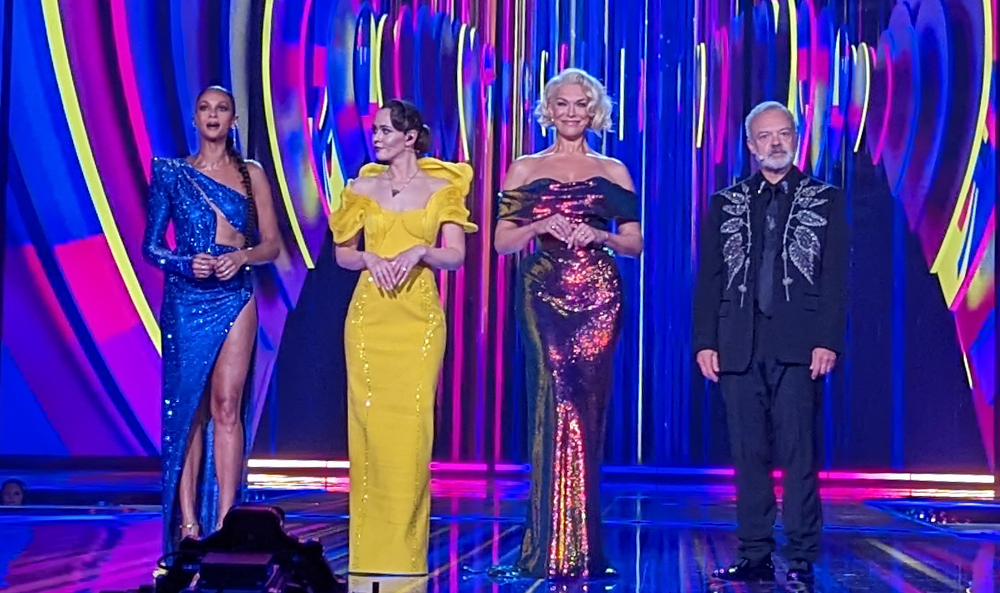
Presenters as they appeared in the final, from left to right: Alesha Dixon, Julia Sanina, Hannah Waddingham and Graham Norton

British singer Alesha Dixon, British actress Hannah Waddingham, and Ukrainian singer Julia Sanina were announced as the presenters for the 2023 contest on 22 February 2023, and they hosted all three shows of the event; Irish television presenter Graham Norton joined them for the final. Norton has served as the BBC's commentator for the contest since 2009, and had previously co-hosted both editions of the Eurovision Dance Contest in 2007 and 2008, as well as Eurovision Song Contest's Greatest Hits in 2015.

The "Turquoise Carpet" and Opening Ceremony events were hosted by Timur Miroshnychenko (who had co-hosted the 2017 contest) and Sam Quek, with Richie Anderson providing off-screen commentary. Miroshnychenko also moderated the contest's press conferences, along with Jermaine Foster and Mariia Vynogradova.

== Format ==
=== Voting system and contest structure ===
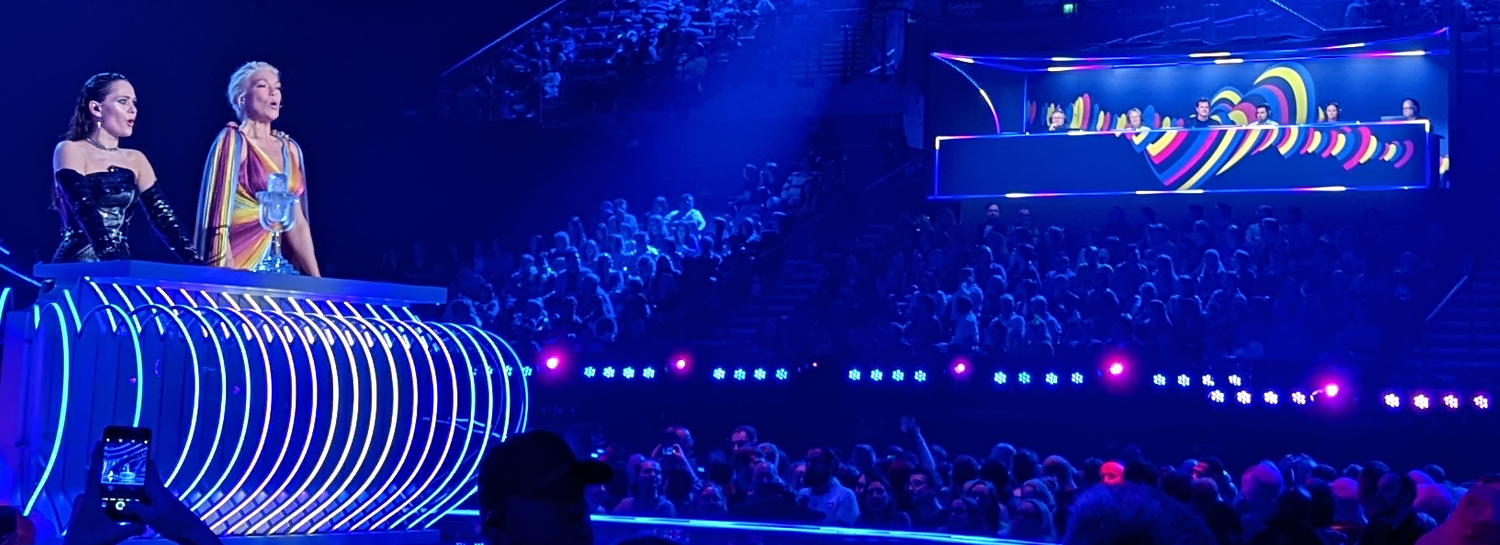
Presenters Julia Sanina and Hannah Waddingham announcing the semi-final qualifiers. The contest's executive supervisor, Martin Österdahl, is seen in the background.

On 22 November 2022, the EBU announced changes to the voting system for the 2023 contest. The results of the semi-finals would be determined solely by televoting, as was the case between 2004 and 2007, (Note: 100% televoting for the semi-finals was also used in 2008 and 2009, with the exception that only nine countries qualified via televoting whilst the highest-ranked entry by the backup juries outside the top nine also qualified.) while the results of the final would be determined by a combination of national juries and televoting, as has been the case since the 2009 final. In the event that a country cannot deliver a televoting result in a semi-final, a backup jury result would be used instead. In the final, in the event that a country cannot deliver a televoting result, an aggregated result calculated on the basis of countries with similar voting patterns would be used. If a country's jury is disqualified, the televoting points from that country would be doubled and used as a substitute for that country's jury points in the final. The procedure of using calculated points would remain as a last resort in the event that a country cannot deliver a valid jury or televoting result. Viewers from non-participating countries would also be able to vote in all shows, with their votes being aggregated and presented as one individual set of points under "Rest of the World". Those viewers would be able to cast votes via an online platform, which requires ownership of a credit or debit card for verification.

On 8 May 2023, a change to the semi-final qualifiers announcement format was revealed, where the acts would be on stage to anticipate the announcement of the finalists instead of sitting in the green room, similar to The X Factor. This format was trialled during a dress rehearsal for the first semi-final, before being dropped on the same day due to negative responses.

=== Semi-final allocation draw ===
Results of the semi-final allocation draw Participating countries in the first semi-final Pre-qualified for the final but also voting in the first semi-final Participating countries in the second semi-final Pre-qualified for the final but also voting in the second semi-final

The draw to determine the participating countries' semi-finals took place on 31 January 2023 at 19:00 GMT (20:00 CET), at St George's Hall. The thirty-one semi-finalists were divided over five pots, based on historical voting patterns as calculated by the contest's official televoting partner Digame. The purpose of drawing from different pots was to reduce the chance of "bloc voting" and to increase suspense in the semi-finals. The draw also determined which semi-final each of the six automatic qualifiers – the previous year's winning country Ukraine and "Big Five" countries France, Germany, Italy, Spain and the United Kingdom – would broadcast and vote in. The ceremony was hosted by AJ Odudu and Rylan, and included the passing of the host city insignia from Stefano Lo Russo, the mayor of previous host city Turin, to Joanne Anderson, the then-mayor of Liverpool. London-based production company ModestTV was commissioned to produce the broadcast of the ceremony.

Pot 1	Pot 2	Pot 3	Pot 4	Pot 5
Albania; Austria; Croatia; Serbia; Slovenia; Switzerland	Australia; Denmark; Estonia; Finland; Iceland; Norway; Sweden	Armenia; Azerbaijan; Georgia; Israel; Latvia; Lithuania	Cyprus; Greece; Ireland; Malta; Portugal; San Marino	Belgium; Czechia; Moldova; Netherlands; Poland; Romania

== Contest overview ==
=== Semi-final 1 ===
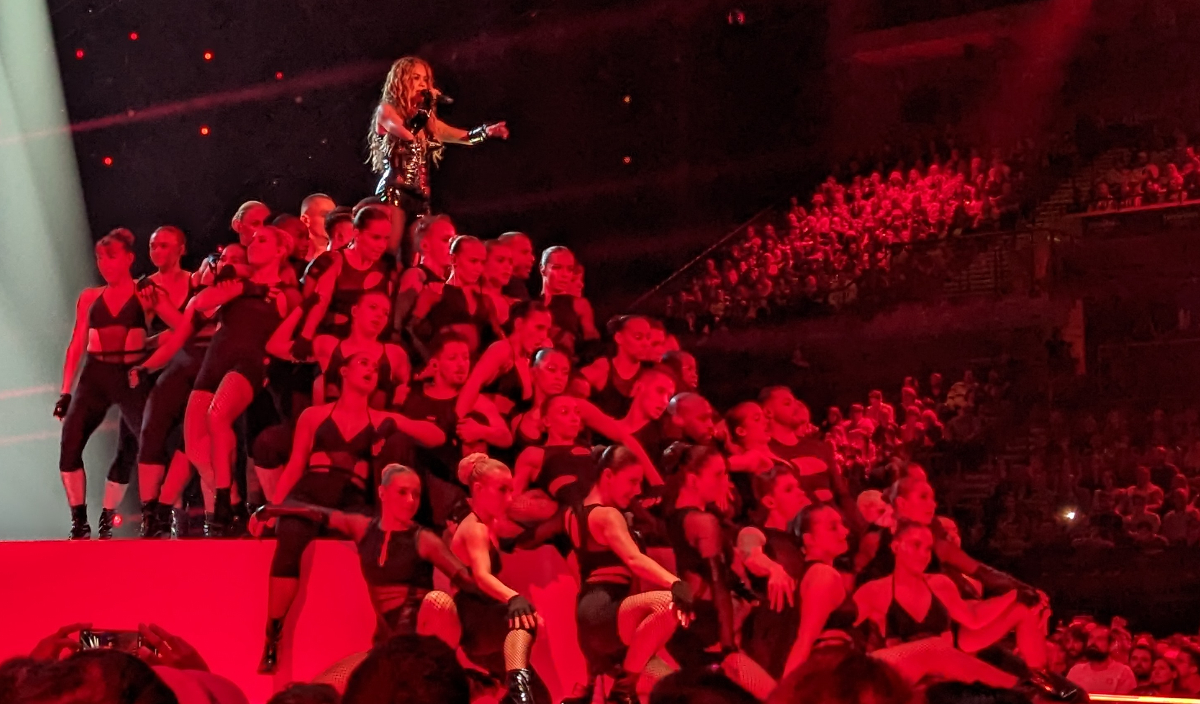
Rita Ora performed as an interval act in the first semi-final.

The first semi-final took place on 9 May 2023 at 20:00 BST (21:00 CEST). Fifteen countries participated in this semi-final, with the running order published on 22 March 2023. Finland won the most points, followed by Sweden, Israel, Czechia, Moldova, Norway, Switzerland, Croatia, Portugal, and Serbia. The countries that failed to reach the final were Latvia, Ireland, the Netherlands, Azerbaijan, and Malta. All the countries competing in this semi-final were eligible to vote, plus France, Germany and Italy, as well as non-participating countries under an aggregated "Rest of the World" vote.

This semi-final was opened by a dance sketch set to "Together in Electric Dreams", preceded by a pre-recorded segment featuring Paul Hollywood, King Charles III, Queen Camilla, Sister Sister, Ricky Tomlinson, Nikita Kuzmin and Paul O'Grady in a posthumous appearance. This was followed by co-presenter Julia Sanina performing "Mayak" with her husband and fellow The Hardkiss member Valeriy Bebko. The interval acts included Alyosha (Ukraine 2010) and Rebecca Ferguson performing "Ordinary World"; and Rita Ora performing a medley of "Ritual", "Anywhere", "I Will Never Let You Down", and "Praising You". The French, German, and Italian artists were then interviewed, and clips of their competing songs were played.

Qualifiers

Results of the first semi-final of the Eurovision Song Contest 2023
R/O	Country	Artist	Song	Points	Place
1	Norway	Alessandra	"Queen of Kings"	102	6
2	Malta	The Busker	"Dance (Our Own Party)"	3	15
3	Serbia	Luke Black	"Samo mi se spava"	37	10
4	Latvia	Sudden Lights	"Aijā"	34	11
5	Portugal	Mimicat	"Ai coração"	74	9
6	Ireland	Wild Youth	"We Are One"	10	12
7	Croatia	Let 3	"Mama ŠČ!"	76	8
8	Switzerland	Remo Forrer	"Watergun"	97	7
9	Israel	Noa Kirel	"Unicorn"	127	3
10	Moldova	Pasha Parfeni	"Soarele și luna"	109	5
11	Sweden	Loreen	"Tattoo"	135	2
12	Azerbaijan	TuralTuranX	"Tell Me More"	4	14
13	Czechia	Vesna	"My Sister's Crown"	110	4
14	Netherlands	Mia Nicolai and Dion Cooper	"Burning Daylight"	7	13
15	Finland	Käärijä	"Cha Cha Cha"	177	1

=== Semi-final 2 ===
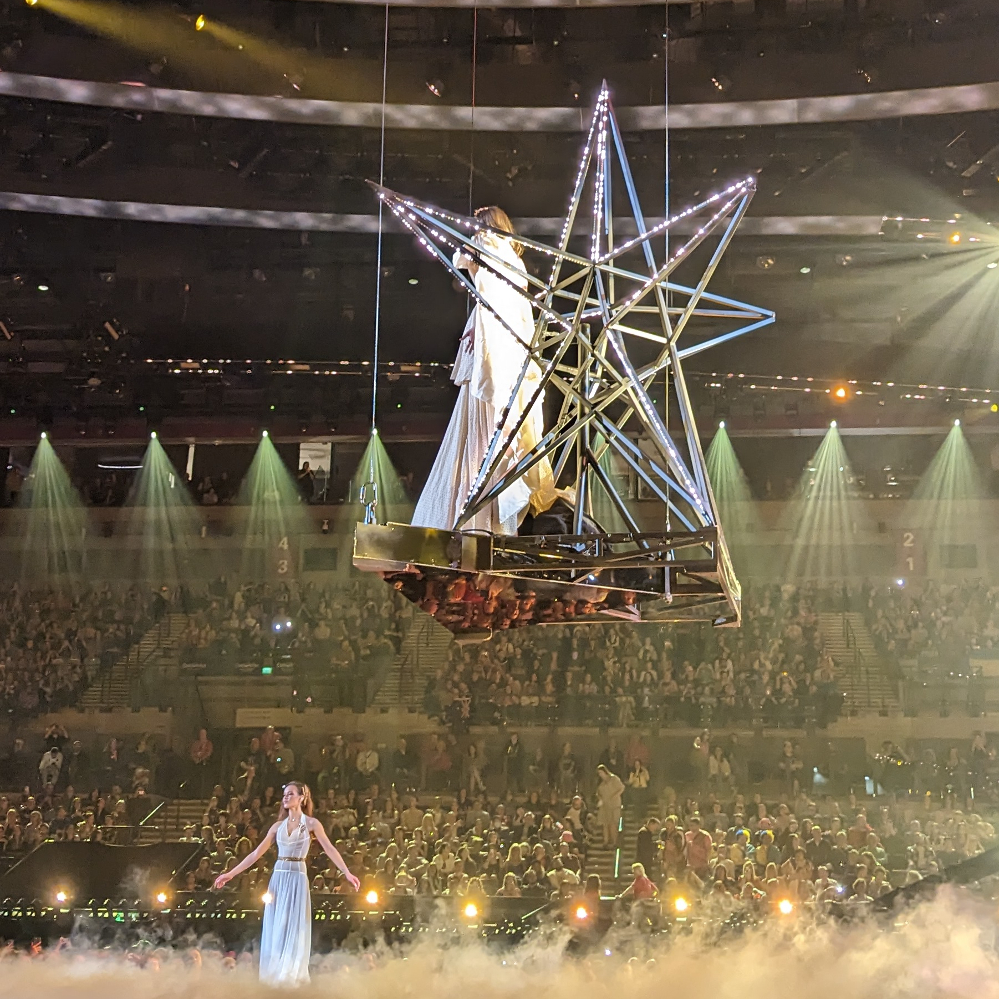
Mariya Yaremchuk and Zlata Dziunka performed as part of an interval act in the second semi-final.

The second semi-final took place on 11 May 2023 at 20:00 BST (21:00 CEST). Sixteen countries participated in this semi-final, with the running order published on 22 March 2023. Australia won the most points, followed by Austria, Poland, Lithuania, Slovenia, Armenia, Cyprus, Belgium, Albania, and Estonia. The countries that failed to reach the final were Iceland, Georgia, Greece, Denmark, Romania, and San Marino. All the countries competing in this semi-final were eligible to vote, plus Spain, Ukraine and the United Kingdom, as well as non-participating countries under an aggregated "Rest of the World" vote.

This semi-final featured a pre-recorded spoken word piece on the history of the contest by actor Luke Evans during a break between the competing performances, while the interval acts included "Music Unites Generations", a medley of Ukrainian musical works performed by Mariya Yaremchuk (Ukraine 2014), Otoy, and Zlata Dziunka (represented Ukraine in Junior Eurovision 2022); and a dance sketch choreographed by Jason Gilkison and performed by drag acts Miss Demeanour, Miss Mercedes Bends, and Tomara Thomas, along with the Podilya dance ensemble. Titled "Be Who You Wanna Be", the second interval act was set to a medley of "Free Yourself", "Free Your Mind", "Free" and the 2018 Australian entry "We Got Love". The British, Spanish and Ukrainian artists were then interviewed, and clips of their competing songs were played.

Qualifiers

Results of the second semi-final of the Eurovision Song Contest 2023
R/O	Country	Artist	Song	Points	Place
1	Denmark	Reiley	"Breaking My Heart"	6	14
2	Armenia	Brunette	"Future Lover"	99	6
3	Romania	Theodor Andrei	"D.G.T. (Off and On)"	0	15 (Note: Both Romania and San Marino scored 0 points, but Romania is deemed to have placed higher according to the tie-break procedure, as it performed earlier in the running order.)
4	Estonia	Alika	"Bridges"	74	10
5	Belgium	Gustaph	"Because of You"	90	8
6	Cyprus	Andrew Lambrou	"Break a Broken Heart"	94	7
7	Iceland	Diljá	"Power"	44	11
8	Greece	Victor Vernicos	"What They Say"	14	13
9	Poland	Blanka	"Solo"	124	3
10	Slovenia	Joker Out	"Carpe Diem"	103	5
11	Georgia	Iru	"Echo"	33	12
12	San Marino	Piqued Jacks	"Like an Animal"	0	16
13	Austria	Teya and Salena	"Who the Hell Is Edgar?"	137	2
14	Albania	Albina and Familja Kelmendi	"Duje"	83	9
15	Lithuania	Monika Linkytė	"Stay"	110	4
16	Australia	Voyager	"Promise"	149	1

=== Final ===
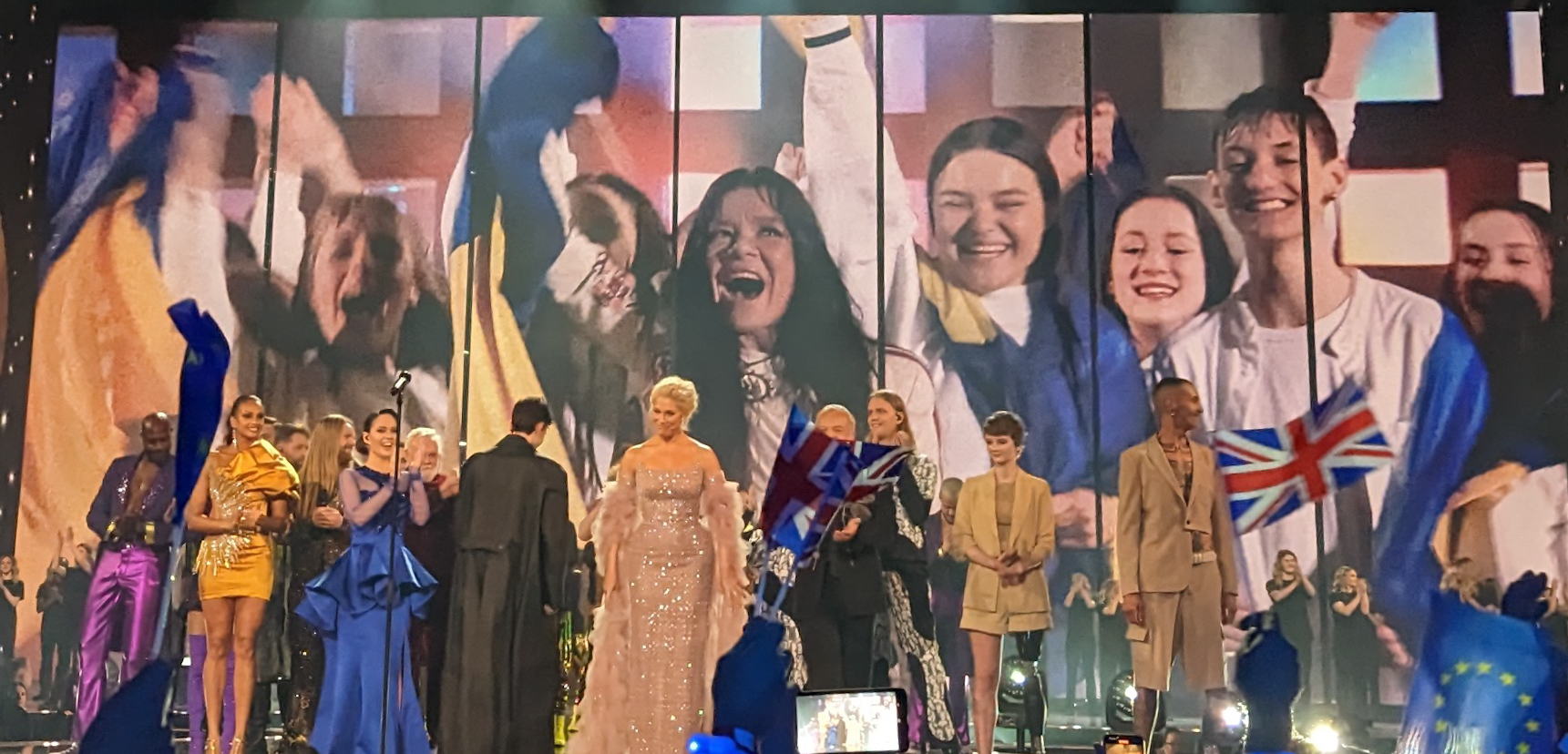
Duncan Laurence performed together with the guest artists and the presenters as part of an interval act in the final. Ruslana can be seen on the LED background, in a pre-recorded appearance from the Golden Gate in Kyiv.

The final took place on 13 May 2023 at 20:00 BST (21:00 CEST). Twenty-six countries participated in the final, with the jury and televote of all thirty-seven participating countries, as well as non-participating countries under an aggregated "Rest of the World" online vote, eligible to vote. The running order for the final was published on 12 May 2023. Sweden won the contest with the song "Tattoo", performed by Loreen and written by her along with Jimmy Jansson, Jimmy "Joker" Thörnfeldt, Moa "Cazzi Opeia" Carlebecker, Peter Boström, and Thomas G:son. Sweden won with 583 points, also winning the jury vote. Finland came second with 526 points and won the televote, with Israel, Italy, Norway, Ukraine, Belgium, Estonia, Australia and Czechia completing the top ten. Albania, Portugal, Serbia, the United Kingdom, and Germany occupied the bottom five positions.

The final was opened by Kalush Orchestra performing their winning song in 2022, "Stefania", and their new single "Changes". Among those who appeared in the pre-recorded portion of the opening were Bolt Strings, Andrew Lloyd Webber, Joss Stone, Ballet Black, Ms Banks, and Catherine, Princess of Wales. This was followed by the flag parade, introducing all twenty-six finalists, accompanied by four former Ukrainian participants performing new spins on their competing entries mixed with British classics: Go_A with "Shum" (2021), Jamala with "1944" (winner in 2016), Tina Karol with "Show Me Your Love" (2006), and Verka Serduchka with "Dancing Lasha Tumbai" (2007).

The interval acts included Sam Ryder (United Kingdom 2022) performing his new single "Mountain" with Roger Taylor of Queen on drums, and "The Liverpool Songbook", a homage to Liverpool's music heritage featuring six former entrants performing their own version of songs from the host city: Mahmood (Italy 2019 and 2022) with "Imagine", Netta (winner for Israel in 2018) with "You Spin Me Round (Like a Record)", Daði Freyr (Iceland 2021) with "Whole Again", Cornelia Jakobs (Sweden 2022) with "I Turn to You", Sonia with her entry for the United Kingdom in 1993, "Better the Devil You Know", and Duncan Laurence (winner for the Netherlands in 2019), together with the aforementioned artists, the presenters, and Ruslana (winner for Ukraine in 2004) in a pre-recorded appearance from the Golden Gate in Kyiv, with "You'll Never Walk Alone". Björn Ulvaeus, who won for Sweden in 1974 as part of ABBA, also appeared in a short video skit on the recent commercial successes to come out of the contest.

Winner

Results of the final of the Eurovision Song Contest 2023
R/O	Country	Artist	Song	Points	Place
1	Austria	Teya and Salena	"Who the Hell Is Edgar?"	120	15
2	Portugal	Mimicat	"Ai coração"	59	23
3	Switzerland	Remo Forrer	"Watergun"	92	20
4	Poland	Blanka	"Solo"	93	19
5	Serbia	Luke Black	"Samo mi se spava"	30	24
6	France	La Zarra	"Évidemment"	104	16
7	Cyprus	Andrew Lambrou	"Break a Broken Heart"	126	12
8	Spain	Blanca Paloma	"Eaea"	100	17
9	Sweden	Loreen	"Tattoo"	583	1
10	Albania	Albina and Familja Kelmendi	"Duje"	76	22
11	Italy	Marco Mengoni	"Due vite"	350	4
12	Estonia	Alika	"Bridges"	168	8
13	Finland	Käärijä	"Cha Cha Cha"	526	2
14	Czechia	Vesna	"My Sister's Crown"	129	10
15	Australia	Voyager	"Promise"	151	9
16	Belgium	Gustaph	"Because of You"	182	7
17	Armenia	Brunette	"Future Lover"	122	14
18	Moldova	Pasha Parfeni	"Soarele și luna"	96	18
19	Ukraine	Tvorchi	"Heart of Steel"	243	6
20	Norway	Alessandra	"Queen of Kings"	268	5
21	Germany	Lord of the Lost	"Blood & Glitter"	18	26
22	Lithuania	Monika Linkytė	"Stay"	127	11
23	Israel	Noa Kirel	"Unicorn"	362	3
24	Slovenia	Joker Out	"Carpe Diem"	78	21
25	Croatia	Let 3	"Mama ŠČ!"	123	13
26	United Kingdom	Mae Muller	"I Wrote a Song"	24	25

==== Spokespersons ====
The spokespersons announced the 12-point score from their respective country's national jury in the following order. Unlike in the editions from 2016 to 2022, in which the previous host country announced its points first, Ukraine was the first country to announce its jury points, followed by the previous host country, Italy. The incumbent host country, the United Kingdom, announced its points last as usual.

1. Ukraine – Zlata Ognevich
2. Italy – Kaze
3. Latvia – Jānis Pētersons
4. Netherlands – S10
5. Malta – Ryan Hili
6. Moldova – Doina Stimpovschi
7. Ireland – Niamh Kavanagh
8. San Marino – John Kennedy O'Connor
9. Azerbaijan – Narmin Salmanova
10. Austria – Philipp Hansa
11. France – Anggun
12. Finland – Bess
13. Belgium – Bart Cannaerts
14. Germany – Elton
15. Portugal – Maro
16. Croatia – Maja Ciglenečki
17. Estonia – Ragnar Klavan
18. Armenia – Maléna
19. Poland – Ida Nowakowska
20. Romania – Eda Marcus
21. Iceland – Einar Stefánsson
22. Serbia – Dragana Kosjerina
23. Cyprus – Loukas Hamatsos
24. Norway – Ben Adams
25. Switzerland – Chiara Dubey
26. Australia – Catherine Martin
27. Denmark – Tina Müller
28. Spain – Ruth Lorenzo
29. Israel – Ilanit
30. Sweden – Farah Abadi
31. Georgia – Archil Sulakvelidze
32. Czechia – Radka Rosická
33. Slovenia – Melani Mekicar
34. Greece – Fotis Sergoulopoulos
35. Albania – Andri Xhahu
36. Lithuania – Monika Liu
37. United Kingdom – Catherine Tate

== Detailed voting results ==
=== Semi-final 1 ===
The ten qualifiers from the first semi-final were determined solely by televoting. All fifteen countries competing in the first semi-final voted, alongside France, Germany and Italy, and the aggregated Rest of the World vote. The ten qualifying countries were announced in no particular order, and the full results of how each country voted was published after the final had been held.

Qualifiers

Detailed voting results of the first semi-final of the Eurovision Song Contest 2023
Voting procedure used: 100% Televoting		Total score	Norway	Malta	Serbia	Latvia	Portugal	Ireland	Croatia	Switzerland	Israel	Moldova	Sweden	Azerbaijan	Czechia	Netherlands	Finland	France	Germany	Italy	Rest of the World
Contestants	Norway	102		10	5	4	3	2	6	3	10	8	10	2	10	5	10	1	3	10	
Contestants	Malta	3									2										1
Contestants	Serbia	37		5					10	6			1	3	3		4	2		1	2
Contestants	Latvia	34			2		4	4				1		6	1	1	3	3	1		8
Contestants	Portugal	74	2	4	3			1	5	12	3	4	4		2	7	2	12	5	2	6
Contestants	Ireland	10	3	3		1	2			1											
Contestants	Croatia	76	4		12	7		5		5	5	3	5		4	2	6		10	5	3
Contestants	Switzerland	97	8	6	1	3	5	7	2		4	7	8	7	5	8	8	6	8	4	
Contestants	Israel	127	5	8	7	8	7	6	7	7		12	3	12	12	4	1	8	2	6	12
Contestants	Moldova	109	6	1	4	6	12	10	3	2	6		6	4	7	3	7	10	6	12	4
Contestants	Sweden	135	10	12	6	10	8	8	4	8	7	10		10	6	12	5	5	4	3	7
Contestants	Azerbaijan	4				2			1		1										
Contestants	Czechia	110	7	2	8	5	6	3	8	4	8	5	7	5		6	12	4	7	8	5
Contestants	Netherlands	7	1				1					2	2	1							
Contestants	Finland	177	12	7	10	12	10	12	12	10	12	6	12	8	8	10		7	12	7	10

==== 12 points ====
Below is a summary of all 12 points awarded in the first semi-final. Finland received the maximum score of 12 points from seven of the voting countries, with Israel receiving four sets of 12 points, Moldova, Portugal and Sweden receiving two sets of 12 points each, and Croatia and Czechia each received one maximum score.

12 points awarded in the first semi-final of the Eurovision Song Contest 2023
#	Recipient	Countries giving 12 points
7	Finland	Croatia, Germany, Ireland, Israel, Latvia, Norway, Sweden
4	Israel	Azerbaijan, Czechia, Moldova, Rest of the World
2	Moldova	Italy, Portugal
2	Portugal	France, Switzerland
2	Sweden	Malta, Netherlands
1	Croatia	Serbia
1	Czechia	Finland

=== Semi-final 2 ===
The ten qualifiers from the second semi-final were determined solely by televoting, with the exception of San Marino which was unable to provide a valid televote result and thus used the votes of its backup jury. All sixteen countries competing in the second semi-final voted, alongside Spain, Ukraine and the United Kingdom, and the aggregated Rest of the World vote. The ten qualifying countries were announced in no particular order, and the full results of how each country voted was published after the final had been held.

Qualifiers

Detailed voting results of the second semi-final of the Eurovision Song Contest 2023
Voting procedure used: 100% Televoting 100% Jury vote		Total score	Denmark	Armenia	Romania	Estonia	Belgium	Cyprus	Iceland	Greece	Poland	Slovenia	Georgia	San Marino	Austria	Albania	Lithuania	Australia	Spain	Ukraine	United Kingdom	Rest of the World
Contestants	Denmark	6							6													
Contestants	Armenia	99			6	3	12	10		8	5	1	12	4	4	8	1	2	10	3		10
Contestants	Romania	0																				
Contestants	Estonia	74	1	6	5		2	3	3	3	2	5	2	10	3	2	10	4	1	8	2	2
Contestants	Belgium	90	8	1		4		4	7	1	3	7	3	5	12	3	5	7	8	1	6	5
Contestants	Cyprus	94	4	10	4	5	4		5	12	7	4	5	1	2	6	4	10	3	4	4	
Contestants	Iceland	44	12			2	1					3	6	7	1	1	2	5			1	3
Contestants	Greece	14		2				12														
Contestants	Poland	124	7	8	3	8	7	6	10	5		8	8	2	7	7	12		4	12	10	
Contestants	Slovenia	103	2	5	12	7	3	2	1	2	12		1		10	4	7	8	12	6	3	6
Contestants	Georgia	33		12	2	1				7	1			3			3	1		2		1
Contestants	San Marino	0																				
Contestants	Austria	137	6	3	7	6	10	5	8	6	10	10	4	8		10	6	12	6	5	7	8
Contestants	Albania	83	3	7	8		8	1	2	10	4	12			6			3	2		5	12
Contestants	Lithuania	110	5		1	10	5	8	4		6	2	10	12	5	5		6	5	10	12	4
Contestants	Australia	149	10	4	10	12	6	7	12	4	8	6	7	6	8	12	8		7	7	8	7

==== 12 points ====
Below is a summary of all 12 points received in the second semi-final. Australia and Slovenia both received the maximum score of 12 points from three of the voting countries, with Albania, Armenia, Lithuania and Poland receiving two sets of 12 points each, and Austria, Belgium, Cyprus, Georgia, Greece and Iceland each receiving one maximum score.

12 points awarded in the second semi-final of the Eurovision Song Contest 2023
#	Recipient	Countries giving 12 points
3	Australia	Albania, Estonia, Iceland
3	Slovenia	Poland, Romania, Spain
2	Albania	Rest of the World, Slovenia
2	Armenia	Belgium, Georgia
2	Lithuania	San Marino, United Kingdom
2	Poland	Lithuania, Ukraine
1	Austria	Australia
1	Belgium	Austria
1	Cyprus	Greece
1	Georgia	Armenia
1	Greece	Cyprus
1	Iceland	Denmark

=== Final ===
Split results
Place	Combined		Jury		Televoting	
Place	Country	Points	Country	Points	Country	Points
1	Sweden	583	Sweden	340	Finland	376
2	Finland	526	Israel	177	Sweden	243
3	Israel	362	Italy	176	Norway	216
4	Italy	350	Finland	150	Ukraine	189
5	Norway	268	Estonia	146	Israel	185
6	Ukraine	243	Australia	130	Italy	174
7	Belgium	182	Belgium	127	Croatia	112
8	Estonia	168	Austria	104	Poland	81
9	Australia	151	Spain	95	Moldova	76
10	Czechia	129	Czechia	94	Albania	59
11	Lithuania	127	Lithuania	81	Cyprus	58
12	Cyprus	126	Armenia	69	Belgium	55
13	Croatia	123	Cyprus	68	Armenia	53
14	Armenia	122	Switzerland	61	France	50
15	Austria	120	Ukraine	54 (Note: Despite finishing with the same number of points as France and receiving points from the same number of countries, Ukraine finished in fifteenth place in the jury voting due to receiving 12 points from a greater number of countries.)	Lithuania	46
16	France	104	France	54	Slovenia	45
17	Spain	100	Norway	52	Czechia	35
18	Moldova	96	Portugal	43	Switzerland	31
19	Poland	93	Slovenia	33	Estonia	22
20	Switzerland	92	Moldova	20	Australia	21
21	Slovenia	78	Albania	17	Serbia	16 (Note: Despite finishing with the same number of points, Serbia and Austria finished higher than Portugal in the televoting due to receiving points from a greater number of countries. Furthermore, despite receiving points from the same number of countries and the same amount of 12, 10, 8 and 7 points, Serbia finished higher in the televoting than Austria due to receiving more 6 points.)
22	Albania	76	United Kingdom	15	Austria	16
23	Portugal	59	Serbia	14	Portugal	16
24	Serbia	30	Poland	12	Germany	15
25	United Kingdom	24	Croatia	11	United Kingdom	9
26	Germany	18	Germany	3	Spain	5

The results of the final were determined by televoting and jury voting in all thirty-seven participating countries, plus the Rest of the World aggregate public vote. The announcement of the jury points was conducted by each country individually, with the country's spokesperson announcing their jury's favourite entry that received 12 points, with the remaining points shown on screen. Following the completion of the jury points announcement, the public points were announced as an aggregate by the contest hosts in ascending order starting from the country which received the fewest points from the jury.

Winner

Detailed jury voting results of the final of the Eurovision Song Contest 2023
Voting procedure used: 100% Televoting; 100% Jury vote		Total score	Jury vote score	Televoting score	Jury vote																																				
Voting procedure used: 100% Televoting; 100% Jury vote		Total score	Jury vote score	Televoting score	Ukraine	Italy	Latvia	Netherlands	Malta	Moldova	Ireland	San Marino	Azerbaijan	Austria	France	Finland	Belgium	Germany	Portugal	Croatia	Estonia	Armenia	Poland	Romania	Iceland	Serbia	Cyprus	Norway	Switzerland	Australia	Denmark	Spain	Israel	Sweden	Georgia	Czechia	Slovenia	Greece	Albania	Lithuania	United Kingdom
Contestants	Austria	120	104	16				1	1			6			10	2	12	2				2			8	6	10		7	6	7		6				3	7		8	
Contestants	Portugal	59	43	16				5	3	8					5	3				1										2		6						10			
Contestants	Switzerland	92	61	31		4		6	6				4	4	3	10			2				2				2	2						6			1	2	7		
Contestants	Poland	93	12	81	6												2					1		1									2								
Contestants	Serbia	30	14	16		1												3	4	4					1													1			
Contestants	France	104	54	50				3			5					7	1					7				4					6	5		10						6	
Contestants	Cyprus	126	68	58			6		5	4				2		1						5	10	6				7		3	5		1	1	3			4	4	1	
Contestants	Spain	100	95	5			8	7		3		2	7				6	7	10	6	2	6			3	3	6	1	3	4						3	2		1		5
Contestants	Sweden	583	340	243	12	8	10	12	12	12	12	4	10	10	6	12	8	12	5	10	12	10	7	10	7	5	12	10	6	7	12	12	12		4	10	7	6	12	12	12
Contestants	Albania	76	17	59						1			8											5														3			
Contestants	Italy	350	176	174	2		3		10	10		12	6	12	2	6	7	4		12	5		6	12		2	5	6	8	1		10		7	8	4	12		2		2
Contestants	Estonia	168	146	22	5	6	12			7		10	1					10	8	3			8	8					10	8		7	5	2	5	2	10		8	5	6
Contestants	Finland	526	150	376				10	8		8		3	8	8		5			7	10	8			10	7	3	12		5	8	1	8	12	1	5				3	
Contestants	Czechia	129	94	35	7	7		8			3			5	4	8	3	5	7						6	1	1	4	12				4	3			6				
Contestants	Australia	151	130	21	8					5	4	5	5				4	8	12		8		4	3	12		8	5	2		2				2	7	4	5	3	4	10
Contestants	Belgium	182	127	55		2	2	4			10	7		3		5			6		6		5	2	5					12	3	4	3		12		5	12	5	7	7
Contestants	Armenia	122	69	53		5	1			2	6			1	7						3		1				4		5			3			10	8			10		3
Contestants	Moldova	96	20	76								3								2				7				8													
Contestants	Ukraine	243	54	189		10	4			6			2		1						7	3											7			12				2	
Contestants	Norway	268	52	216					2			1						6	1			4			4				4		10	2	10	8							
Contestants	Germany	18	3	15																					2											1					
Contestants	Lithuania	127	81	46	10	3	7		4		1	8		7				1			1		3							10	4				6		8				8
Contestants	Israel	362	177	185	1	12	5	2	7		7		12		12		10			8	4	12	12	4		10	7	3	1			8		5	7			8	6	10	4
Contestants	Slovenia	78	33	45	3									6						5						12										6					1
Contestants	Croatia	123	11	112															3							8															
Contestants	United Kingdom	24	15	9	4						2					4															1			4							

Detailed televoting results of the final of the Eurovision Song Contest 2023
Voting procedure used: 100% Televoting 100% Jury vote		Total score	Jury vote score	Televoting score	Televote																																					
Voting procedure used: 100% Televoting 100% Jury vote		Total score	Jury vote score	Televoting score	Ukraine	Italy	Latvia	Netherlands	Malta	Moldova	Ireland	San Marino	Azerbaijan	Austria	France	Finland	Belgium	Germany	Portugal	Croatia	Estonia	Armenia	Poland	Romania	Iceland	Serbia	Cyprus	Norway	Switzerland	Australia	Denmark	Spain	Israel	Sweden	Georgia	Czechia	Slovenia	Greece	Albania	Lithuania	United Kingdom	Rest of the World
Contestants	Austria	120	104	16				4								2										3				7												
Contestants	Portugal	59	43	16											5														7			4										
Contestants	Switzerland	92	61	31		1							1	2		1		3			4	2						5			4			8								
Contestants	Poland	93	12	81	12			2		4	8	1					4	4			3	5			7		2	6			5						1		1	8	8	
Contestants	Serbia	30	14	16					2											7									1								6					
Contestants	France	104	54	50					1								2		2			10		3	4	1	3	8		2			1	2			3	3	3	1		1
Contestants	Cyprus	126	68	58						3		5	6									8	4	1				2		8	2							12	7			
Contestants	Spain	100	95	5															3																							2
Contestants	Sweden	583	340	243	3	3	8	8	10	8	6	8	10	4	3		10	1	7	2	10	7	7	8	10	6	8	10	5	10	8	5	4		7	6	4	8	10	7	5	7
Contestants	Albania	76	17	59		7			3					3			3	8		6									12								7	4				6
Contestants	Italy	350	176	174				3	12	5		7	4	8	7		7	10	6	8	2	3		7	1	2	6	7	10		3	6	7	6	5	1	8	5	12	6		
Contestants	Estonia	168	146	22			6	5								6																								5		
Contestants	Finland	526	150	376	10	6	12	12	8	7	12	12	8	12	6		12	12	10	10	12	6	10	10	12	12	7	12	8	12	12	12	12	12	8	10	10	10	6	12	12	10
Contestants	Czechia	129	94	35	2	2	1			1			3			10				3			3			4							2	3				1				
Contestants	Australia	151	130	21				1								8					6				3									1							2	
Contestants	Belgium	182	127	55				10			3				2			2	1						6			4		3	6	3		7			2				6	
Contestants	Armenia	122	69	53						2					12		6										4					2	3		12	2		2				8
Contestants	Moldova	96	20	76	6	12					4	3			8	3			8	1				12			1				1	1	5		3	5				2	1	
Contestants	Ukraine	243	54	189		8	7		5	12	7	6	7	5	4		1	7	12		8	1	12	4	2		10	1			7	10	8	4	10	12				10	4	5
Contestants	Norway	268	52	216	7	10	3	7	7	6	5	4	2	7	1	12	8	5	4	5	7	4	8	5	8	5	5		2	6	10	8	10	10	2	7	5	6	4		7	4
Contestants	Germany	18	3	15										6		5													4													
Contestants	Lithuania	127	81	46	4		10				10	2									5		1												4						10	
Contestants	Israel	362	177	185	1	5	5	6	6	10	1	10	12	1	10		5		5	4		12	5	6		7	12	3	3	5		7			6	8		7	5	3	3	12
Contestants	Slovenia	78	33	45			2						5			7				12	1		2	2		8				1						3			2			
Contestants	Croatia	123	11	112	8	4	4				2			10		4		6					6		5	10			6	4			6	5	1	4	12		8	4		3
Contestants	United Kingdom	24	15	9	5				4																																	

==== 12 points ====
Below is a summary of all 12 points received in the final. In the jury vote, Sweden received the maximum score of 12 points from fifteen countries, with Italy and Israel receiving five sets of 12 points. Belgium received the maximum score from three countries, Australia and Finland were awarded two sets of 12 points each, and Austria, Czechia, Estonia, Slovenia and Ukraine were each being awarded one set of 12 points. In the public vote, Finland received the maximum score of 12 points from eighteen countries, followed by Israel and Ukraine which received four sets of 12 points each. Armenia, Italy and Moldova received two sets of maximum scores each, and Albania, Croatia, Cyprus, Norway, Poland and Slovenia were each awarded one set of 12 points. The winning country Sweden failed to receive any maximum scores from the public vote.

12 points awarded by juries in the final of the Eurovision Song Contest 2023
#	Recipient	Countries giving 12 points
15	Sweden	Albania, Cyprus, Denmark, Estonia, Finland, Germany, Ireland, Israel, Lithuania, Malta, Moldova, Netherlands, Spain, Ukraine, United Kingdom
5	Israel	Armenia, Azerbaijan, France, Italy, Poland
5	Italy	Austria, Croatia, Romania, San Marino, Slovenia
3	Belgium	Australia, Georgia, Greece
2	Australia	Iceland, Portugal
2	Finland	Norway, Sweden
1	Austria	Belgium
1	Czechia	Switzerland
1	Estonia	Latvia
1	Slovenia	Serbia
1	Ukraine	Czechia

12 points awarded by televoting in the final of the Eurovision Song Contest 2023
#	Recipient	Countries giving 12 points
18	Finland	Australia, Austria, Belgium, Denmark, Estonia, Germany, Iceland, Ireland, Israel, Latvia, Lithuania, Netherlands, Norway, San Marino, Serbia, Spain, Sweden, United Kingdom
4	Israel	Armenia, Azerbaijan, Cyprus, Rest of the World
4	Ukraine	Czechia, Moldova, Poland, Portugal
2	Italy	Albania, Malta
2	Armenia	France, Georgia
2	Moldova	Italy, Romania
1	Albania	Switzerland
1	Cyprus	Greece
1	Croatia	Slovenia
1	Norway	Finland
1	Poland	Ukraine
1	Slovenia	Croatia

== Broadcasts ==
All participating broadcasters may choose to have on-site or remote commentators providing insight and voting information to their local audience. While they must broadcast at least the semi-final they are voting in and the final, most broadcasters air all three shows with different programming plans. In addition, some non-participating broadcasters air the contest. The European Broadcasting Union also provided international live streams with no commentary of both semi-finals and the final through their official YouTube and TikTok channels. The table below details the broadcasting plans and commentators for the countries that aired the contest. According to the EBU, in total 162 million people watched at least a minute of the television broadcasts, and 15.6 million people watched the online broadcasts. Votes were received from 144 countries, including the 37 competing countries.

Technical issues occurred during the start of the first semi-final, causing most of the on-site commentators to lose connection to their broadcasters for around 15 minutes.

Broadcasters and commentators in participating countries
Country	Broadcaster	Channel(s)	Show(s)	Commentator(s)	Ref(s)
Albania	RTSH	RTSH 1, RTSH Muzikë, Radio Tirana	All shows	Andri Xhahu	
Armenia	AMPTV	Armenia 1	All shows	Hrachuhi Utmazyan and Hamlet Arakelyan	
Australia	SBS	SBS	All shows	Myf Warhurst and Joel Creasey	
Austria	ORF	ORF 1	All shows	Andi Knoll	
Austria	ORF	FM4	Final	Jan Böhmermann and Olli Schulz	
Azerbaijan	İTV		All shows	Azer Suleymanli	
Belgium	VRT	VRT 1	All shows	Peter Van de Veire	
Belgium	VRT	Radio 2	Final	Peter Van de Veire	
Belgium	RTBF	Tipik	SF1	Jean-Louis Lahaye and Maureen Louys	
Belgium	RTBF	La Une	SF2/Final	Jean-Louis Lahaye and Maureen Louys	
Belgium	RTBF	VivaCité	All shows	Jean-Louis Lahaye and Maureen Louys	
Croatia	HRT	HRT 1, HR 2	All shows	Duško Ćurlić	
Cyprus	CyBC	RIK 1, RIK Sat	All shows	Melina Karageorgiou and Alexandros Taramountas	
Czechia	ČT	ČT2	All shows	Jan Maxián	
Denmark	DR	DR1	All shows	Nicolai Molbech	
Estonia	ERR	ETV	All shows	Marko Reikop	
Estonia	ERR	ETV+	All shows	Aleksandr Hobotov and Julia Kalenda	
Estonia	ERR	ETV2	Final	Sign language: Various interpreters	
Finland	Yle	Yle TV1	All shows	Mikko Silvennoinen	
Finland	Yle	Yle Radio Suomi	All shows	Sanna Pirkkalainen and Jorma Hietamäki	
Finland	Yle	Yle X3M	All shows	Eva Frantz and Johan Lindroos	
Finland	Yle	YleX	SF1/Final	Sini Laitinen	
Finland	Yle	Yle Areena	All shows	Swedish: Eva Frantz and Johan Lindroos; Inari Sámi: Heli Huovinen; Northern Sámi: Aslak Paltto	
Finland	Yle	Yle Areena	SF1/Final	Russian: Levan Tvaltvadze; Ukrainian: Galyna Sergeyeva	
France	France Télévisions	Culturebox	Semi‑finals	Anggun and André Manoukian	
France	France Télévisions	France 2	Final	Laurence Boccolini and Stéphane Bern	
France	France Télévisions	Guadeloupe La Première	Semi‑finals (Note: Delayed broadcasts of the first semi-final at 22:30 AST and the second semi-final at 23:50 AST)	Anggun and André Manoukian	
France	France Télévisions	Guadeloupe La Première	Final (Note: Delayed broadcast at 23:00 AST)	Laurence Boccolini and Stéphane Bern	
Georgia	GPB	1TV	All shows	Nika Lobiladze	
Germany	ARD/NDR	One	All shows	Peter Urban	
Germany	ARD/NDR	Das Erste	Final	Peter Urban	
Germany	Deutsche Welle	DW Deutsch, DW Deutsch+	Final	Peter Urban	
Germany	ARD/RBB	Radio Eins	Final	Amelie Ernst and Max Spallek	
Greece	ERT	ERT1	All shows	Maria Kozakou and Jenny Melita	
Greece	ERT	Deftero Programma	All shows	Dimitris Meidanis, Maria Kozakou and Jenny Melita	
Iceland	RÚV	RÚV	All shows	Gísli Marteinn Baldursson	
Iceland	RÚV	RÚV 2	All shows	Sign language: Various interpreters	
Ireland	RTÉ	RTÉ One	SF1/Final	Marty Whelan	
Ireland	RTÉ	RTÉ2	SF2	Marty Whelan	
Ireland	RTÉ	RTÉ 2fm	SF1/Final	Neil Doherty and Zbyszek Zalinski	
Israel	IPBC	Kan 11, Kan Educational, Kan 88	Semi‑finals	Asaf Liberman and Akiva Novick	
Israel	IPBC	Kan 11, Kan Tarbut, Kan Bet	Final	Asaf Liberman, Akiva Novick and Doron Medalie	
Israel	IPBC	Kan 88	Final	Kobi Menora and Sharon Kantor	
Italy	RAI	Rai 2	Semi‑finals	Gabriele Corsi and Mara Maionchi	
Italy	RAI	Rai 1	Final	Gabriele Corsi and Mara Maionchi	
Italy	RAI	Rai Radio 2	All shows	Mariolina Simone, Diletta Parlangeli and Saverio Raimondo	
Latvia	LTV	LTV1	All shows	Toms Grēviņš	
Latvia	LTV	LTV1	Final	Lauris Reiniks	
Lithuania	LRT	LRT televizija, LRT Radijas	All shows	Ramūnas Zilnys	
Malta	PBS	TVM	All shows	No commentary	
Moldova	TRM	Moldova 1, Radio Moldova, Radio Moldova Muzical	All shows	Ion Jalbă	
Netherlands	AVROTROS	NPO 1, BVN	All shows	Cornald Maas and Jan Smit	
Netherlands	AVROTROS	NPO Radio 2	Final	Wouter van der Goes and Frank van 't Hof	
Norway	NRK	NRK1	All shows	Marte Stokstad	
Norway	NRK	NRK3, NRK P3	Final	Arian Engebø, Egil Skurdal, Adelina Ibishi and Nate Kahungu	
Norway	NRK	NRK P1	Final	Jon Marius Hyttebakk	
Poland	TVP	TVP1, TVP Polonia	All shows	Aleksander Sikora and Marek Sierocki	
Portugal	RTP	RTP1, RTP Internacional, RTP África	All shows (Note: Second semi-final broadcast live on RTP Play and on tape-delay on RTP1 and RTP Internacional at 21:43 WEST (20:43 UTC) and on RTP África at 02:45 WEST (01:45 UTC) on 12 May)	José Carlos Malato and Nuno Galopim	
Romania	TVR	TVR 1, TVRi	All shows	Bogdan Stănescu and Kyrie Mendel	
San Marino	SMRTV	San Marino RTV, Radio San Marino	All shows	Lia Fiorio and Gigi Restivo	
Serbia	RTS	RTS Svet	All shows	Duška Vučinić (Note: Due to the aforementioned technical issues, Tijana Lukić commentated from Belgrade during the first 15 minutes of the first semi-final.)	
Serbia	RTS	RTS 3	Semi‑finals	Duška Vučinić	
Serbia	RTS	RTS 1	Final	Duška Vučinić	
Serbia	RTS	Radio Beograd 1	Final	Duška Vučinić	
Slovenia	RTVSLO	TV SLO 2	Semi‑finals	Andrej Hofer	
Slovenia	RTVSLO	TV SLO 1	Final	Andrej Hofer	
Slovenia	RTVSLO	Radio Val 202, Radio Maribor	SF2	Maja Stepančič, Maruša Kerec, Neja Jerant and Uršula Zaletelj	
Slovenia	RTVSLO	Radio Val 202, Radio Maribor	Final	Maja Stepančič, Miha Šalehar and Uršula Zaletelj	
Spain	RTVE	La 2	SF1	Tony Aguilar and Julia Varela	
Spain	RTVE	La 1	SF2/Final	Tony Aguilar and Julia Varela	
Spain	RTVE	TVE Internacional	All shows	Tony Aguilar and Julia Varela	
Spain	RTVE	Radio Nacional	Final	David Asensio, Imanol Durán, Irene Vaquero and Ángela Fernández	
Sweden	SVT	SVT1	All shows	Edward af Sillén	
Sweden	SVT	SVT1	Final	Måns Zelmerlöw	
Sweden	SVT	SVT24	All shows	Audio description: Annika Lundin	
Sweden	SR	SR P4	All shows	Carolina Norén	
Switzerland	SRG SSR	SRF zwei	Semi‑finals	Sven Epiney	
Switzerland	SRG SSR	SRF 1	Final	Sven Epiney	
Switzerland	SRG SSR	RTS 2	Semi‑finals	Jean-Marc Richard, Nicolas Tanner and Priscilla Formaz	
Switzerland	SRG SSR	RTS 1	Final	Jean-Marc Richard, Nicolas Tanner and Priscilla Formaz	
Switzerland	SRG SSR	RSI La 2	Semi‑finals	Ellis Cavallini and Gian-Andrea Costa	
Switzerland	SRG SSR	RSI La 1	Final	Ellis Cavallini and Gian-Andrea Costa	
Ukraine	UA:PBC	Suspilne Kultura	All shows	Timur Miroshnychenko	
Ukraine	UA:PBC	Radio Promin	Final	Oleksandra Franko and Oleksandr Barbelen	
United Kingdom	BBC	BBC One	Semi‑finals	Scott Mills and Rylan	
United Kingdom	BBC	BBC One	Final	Graham Norton and Mel Giedroyc	
United Kingdom	BBC	BBC iPlayer	All shows	Sign language: Various interpreters	
United Kingdom	BBC	BBC Radio 2, BBC Radio Merseyside	Semi‑finals	Paddy O'Connell	
United Kingdom	BBC	BBC Radio 2	Final	Scott Mills and Rylan	
United Kingdom	BBC	BBC Radio Merseyside	Final	Claire Sweeney and Paul Quinn	

Broadcasters and commentators in non-participating countries and territories
Country/Territory	Broadcaster	Channel(s)	Show(s)	Commentator(s)	Ref(s)
Chile	Canal 13		Final	Sergio Lagos and Rayén Araya	
Faroe Islands	KVF		All shows	Faroese: Gunnar Nolsøe and Siri Súsonnudóttir Hansen; Danish: Nicolai Molbech (Note: Retransmission of DR's commentary feed)	
Kosovo	RTK	RTK 1	All shows	Jeta Çitaku and Ylber Asllanaj	
Montenegro	RTCG	TVCG 2	All shows	Ivan Maksimović	
Montenegro	RTCG	Radio 98	All shows	Unknown	
North Macedonia	MRT	MRT 1, MRT 2, Radio Skopje	All shows	Aleksandra Jovanovska and Eli Tanaskovska	
Slovakia	RTVS	Rádio FM	Final	Daniel Baláž, Lucia Haverlík, Pavol Hubinák and Juraj Malíček	
United States	NBC	Peacock	All shows	No commentary	
United States	NBC	Peacock	Final	Johnny Weir	
United States	WJFD-FM		Final	Ewan Spence and Samantha Ross	

== Incidents and controversies ==
=== Rejection of Volodymyr Zelenskyy address ===
Ahead of the final, the European Broadcasting Union (EBU) declined a request for Ukrainian president Volodymyr Zelenskyy to deliver a video address during the broadcast, citing the contest's rules prohibiting political statements. While Zelenskyy's press secretary denied that an official request had been made, the EBU's decision drew criticism from British prime minister Rishi Sunak, opposition leader Keir Starmer, and Ukrainian officials.

=== Israeli participation ===
Israel's participation met with criticism and pro-Palestinian protests outside the M&S Bank Arena during the finals, with activists accusing the European Broadcasting Union (EBU) of double standards for allowing Israel to compete while excluding Russia. Following the Grand Final, Israeli representative Noa Kirel also sparked diplomatic criticism from Polish officials after stating in a post-show interview that receiving 12 jury points from Poland felt like a "true victory" because members of her family had been murdered in the Holocaust on Polish soil.

== Reception ==
=== Commercial impact ===
After winning the 2023 contest, Sweden's entry "Tattoo" became a commercial success. It peaked at number two on the UK singles chart dated 19 May 2023, and later became the first Eurovision song in 27 years to spend two weeks in the UK top five. In total, it spent four weeks in the UK top ten. It also topped the official charts in ten countries, and reached the top ten in a further 17 countries. The day after the final, "Tattoo" garnered 4,275,290 streams on Spotify, thus breaking the record for the most streams achieved by a Eurovision song on a single day, which was previously held by the 2021 winning entry "Zitti e buoni".

Along with "Tattoo", three other entries in the 2023 contest entered the top ten of the UK singles chart dated 19 May 2023, which is a first in the history of the chart: Finland's "Cha Cha Cha" at number six, the UK's "I Wrote a Song" at number nine, and Norway's "Queen of Kings" at number ten. On the Billboard Global 200 chart dated 27 May 2023, "Tattoo", "Cha Cha Cha" and "Queen of Kings" entered at numbers 15, 27 and 58, respectively. On the Billboard Global Excl. US chart also dated 27 May 2023, "Tattoo", "Cha Cha Cha" and "Queen of Kings" entered at numbers 7, 13 and 29, respectively, followed by Israel's "Unicorn" at number 153 and Italy's "Due vite" at number 174. "Due vite" had previously peaked at number 32 following its win at the Sanremo Music Festival 2023, which also doubled as the Italian national final.

=== Reaction to the results ===
Sweden's overall victory despite Finland's lead in the televoting sparked controversy among viewers and the live audience. During the jury voting sequence, several occasions when Sweden scored 12 points were disrupted by chanting from Finland's supporters, although the Swedish entrant Loreen, following her win, stated that she did not mind and furthermore appreciated their enthusiasm. While the televote winner failed to win overall on three previous occasions, in 2015, 2016 and 2019, 2023 was different in that Finland's lead of 133 points in the televote was the largest to date for an entry that did not win, and it also received the full 12 points from 18 different countries in the televoting, while Sweden did not win 12 points from any.

=== Broadcasting awards ===
The 2023 contest was presented with the Changemaker Award at the International Broadcasting Convention, in recognition of "its contribution to society and culture – celebrating a brand that continues to stay relevant and fresh on a huge scale". The award was received on 17 September 2023 by the contest's executive supervisor Martin Österdahl. The broadcast of the contest received nominations at the 2024 British Academy Television Awards for Best Entertainment Performance (for co-presenter Hannah Waddingham) and Best Live Event Coverage, and at the 2024 British Academy Television Craft Awards for Best Director: Multi-Camera (for Nikki Parsons, Ollie Bartlett, and Richard Valentine), and Best Entertainment Craft Team (for Julio Himede, Tim Routledge, Kojo Samuel, Michael Sharp, and Dan Shipton); it won the latter three awards.

Year	Category	Nominee	Result	Ref.
2024	Best Entertainment Performance	Hannah Waddingham	Nominated	
2024	Best Live Event	Eurovision Song Contest 2023	Won	

== Other awards ==
In addition to the main winner's trophy, the Marcel Bezençon Awards and the You're a Vision Award were contested during the Eurovision Song Contest 2023. The OGAE, "General Organisation of Eurovision Fans" voting poll also took place before the contest. Eurovision Awards, an end-of-year poll conducted by the contest's official site, returned for a third year with the results determined across eight categories.

=== Marcel Bezençon Awards ===
The Marcel Bezençon Awards, organised since 2002 by Sweden's then-Head of Delegation and 1992 representative Christer Björkman, and winner of the 1984 contest Richard Herrey, honours songs in the contest's final. The awards are divided into three categories: the Artistic Award, the Composers Award, and the Press Award. The winners were revealed shortly before the Eurovision final on 13 May.

Category	Country	Song	Artist	Songwriter(s)
Artistic Award	Sweden	"Tattoo"	Loreen	Jimmy "Joker" Thörnfeldt; Jimmy Jansson; Lorine Talhaoui; Moa Carlebecker; Peter Boström; Thomas Gustafsson
Press Award	Sweden	"Tattoo"	Loreen	Jimmy "Joker" Thörnfeldt; Jimmy Jansson; Lorine Talhaoui; Moa Carlebecker; Peter Boström; Thomas Gustafsson
Composers Award	Italy	"Due vite"	Marco Mengoni	Marco Mengoni; Davide Petrella; Davide Simonetta

=== OGAE ===
OGAE, an organisation of over forty Eurovision Song Contest fan clubs across Europe and beyond, conducts an annual voting poll first held in 2002 as the Marcel Bezençon Fan Award. After all votes were cast, the top-ranked entry in the 2023 poll was also the winner of the contest, "Tattoo" performed by Loreen; the top five results are shown below.

Country	Artist	Song	Points
Sweden	Loreen	"Tattoo"	423
Finland	Käärijä	"Cha Cha Cha"	394
France	La Zarra	"Évidemment"	302
Norway	Alessandra	"Queen of Kings"	263
Austria	Teya and Salena	"Who the Hell Is Edgar?"	228

=== You're a Vision Award ===
The You're a Vision Award (a word play of "Eurovision"), established in 2022 by the fansite Songfestival.be following the cancellation of the Barbara Dex Award due to its associated negative connotations, aims to "celebrate the creativity and diversity that embody the Eurovision spirit", with the winner being the one with the most notable outfit. Finland's Käärijä won the 2023 award, with Croatia's Let 3 and Belgium's Gustaph completing the top three.

Place	Country	Artist
1	Finland	Käärijä
2	Croatia	Let 3
3	Belgium	Gustaph

== Official album ==
Cover art of the official album

Eurovision Song Contest: Liverpool 2023 is the official compilation album of the contest. It was put together by the European Broadcasting Union and was released by Universal Music Group digitally on 14 April 2023, in CD format on 28 April 2023, and in vinyl format on 26 May 2023. The album features all 37 entries.

=== Charts ===
Weekly chart performance for Eurovision Song Contest: Liverpool 2023
Chart (2023)	Peak position
Australian Albums (ARIA)	15
Austrian Compilation Albums (Ö3 Austria)	1
Belgian Compilation Albums (Ultratop 50 Flanders)	1
Belgian Compilation Albums (Ultratop 50 Wallonia)	1
Croatian International Albums (HDU)	7
Danish Compilation Albums (Tracklisten)	4
Dutch Compilation Albums (Compilation Top 30)	1
Finnish Physical Albums (Suomen virallinen lista)	8
German Compilation Albums (Offizielle Top 100)	2
Irish Compilation Albums (IRMA)	1
Swedish Physical Albums (Sverigetopplistan)	5
Swiss Compilation Albums (Schweizer Hitparade)	1
UK Compilation Albums (Official Charts)	1
US Top Compilation Albums (Billboard)	8

=== Certifications ===
Certifications for Eurovision Song Contest: Liverpool 2023
Region	Certification	Certified units/sales
United Kingdom (BPI)	Gold	100,000^{‡}
^{‡} Sales+streaming figures based on certification alone.

== See also ==
- Junior Eurovision Song Contest 2023
