= Bulgaria in the Eurovision Song Contest 2022 =

- Eurovision Song Contest 2022
- Participating broadcaster: Bulgarian National Television (BNT)
- Country: Bulgaria
- Selection process: Internal selection
- Announcement date: 25 November 2021

Competing entry
- Song: "Intention"
- Artist: Intelligent Music Project
- Songwriters: Milen Vrabevski

Placement
- Semi-final result: Failed to qualify (16th)

Participation chronology

Bulgaria was represented at the Eurovision Song Contest 2022 with the song "Intention", written by Milen Vrabevski and performed by Intelligent Music Project. The Bulgarian participating broadcaster, Bulgarian National Television (BNT), internally selected its entry for the contest. The band were announced on 25 November 2021, with "Intention" released on 7 December 2021.

Bulgaria was drawn to compete in the first semi-final of the Eurovision Song Contest which took place on 10 May 2022. Performing during the show in position 7, "Intention" was not announced among the top 10 entries of the first semi-final and therefore did not qualify to compete in the final. It was later revealed that Bulgaria placed 16 out of the 17 participating countries in the semi-final with 29 points.

Following the contest, BNT opted not to participate until an eventual return in 2026.

== Background ==
Bulgarian National Television (BNT) debuted at the Eurovision Song Contest in 2005. It initially struggled to qualify for the final, with their only success being in 2007 when the song "Water" performed by Elitsa and Stoyan achieved 5th place in the final. In 2014, after a six-year non-qualification streak, BNT withdrew from the contest due to financial problems. They returned in 2016, "If Love Was a Crime" performed by Poli Genova represented the country, achieving 4th place. Their success continued in 2017, when "Beautiful Mess" performed by Kristian Kostov achieved their best result to date, 2nd place.

In 2019, BNT once again did not participate in the contest due to limited finances, but returned in 2020 backed financially by a sponsor. The broadcaster internally selected Victoria Georgieva to represent the country with "Tears Getting Sober", before the 2020 contest was cancelled due to the COVID-19 pandemic. Georgieva instead represented Bulgaria in 2021 with "Growing Up Is Getting Old", which achieved 11th place in the final with 170 points.

As part of its duties as participating broadcaster, BNT organises the selection of its entry in the Eurovision Song Contest and broadcasts the event in the country. In the past, the broadcaster had alternated between both internal selections and national finals in order to select its entry. BNT has opted for an internal selection process since 2016.

== Before Eurovision ==
=== Internal selection ===
In mid-September 2021, Intelligent Music Project founder Milen Vrabevski revealed to Radio Plovdiv that they had been selected to represent Bulgaria at the Eurovision Song Contest 2022. No official confirmation came until 25 November, when BNT announced the group as their representative for 2022 with the song "Intention".

Among the members of the group is Stoyan Yankoulov, who together with Elitsa Todorova represented Bulgaria in 2007, where they placed fifth with the song "Water", and in 2013, where they failed to qualify for the final with the song "Samo shampioni", and Chilean rock musician Ronnie Romero, who has been the lead singer of several bands, including Rainbow.

== At Eurovision ==
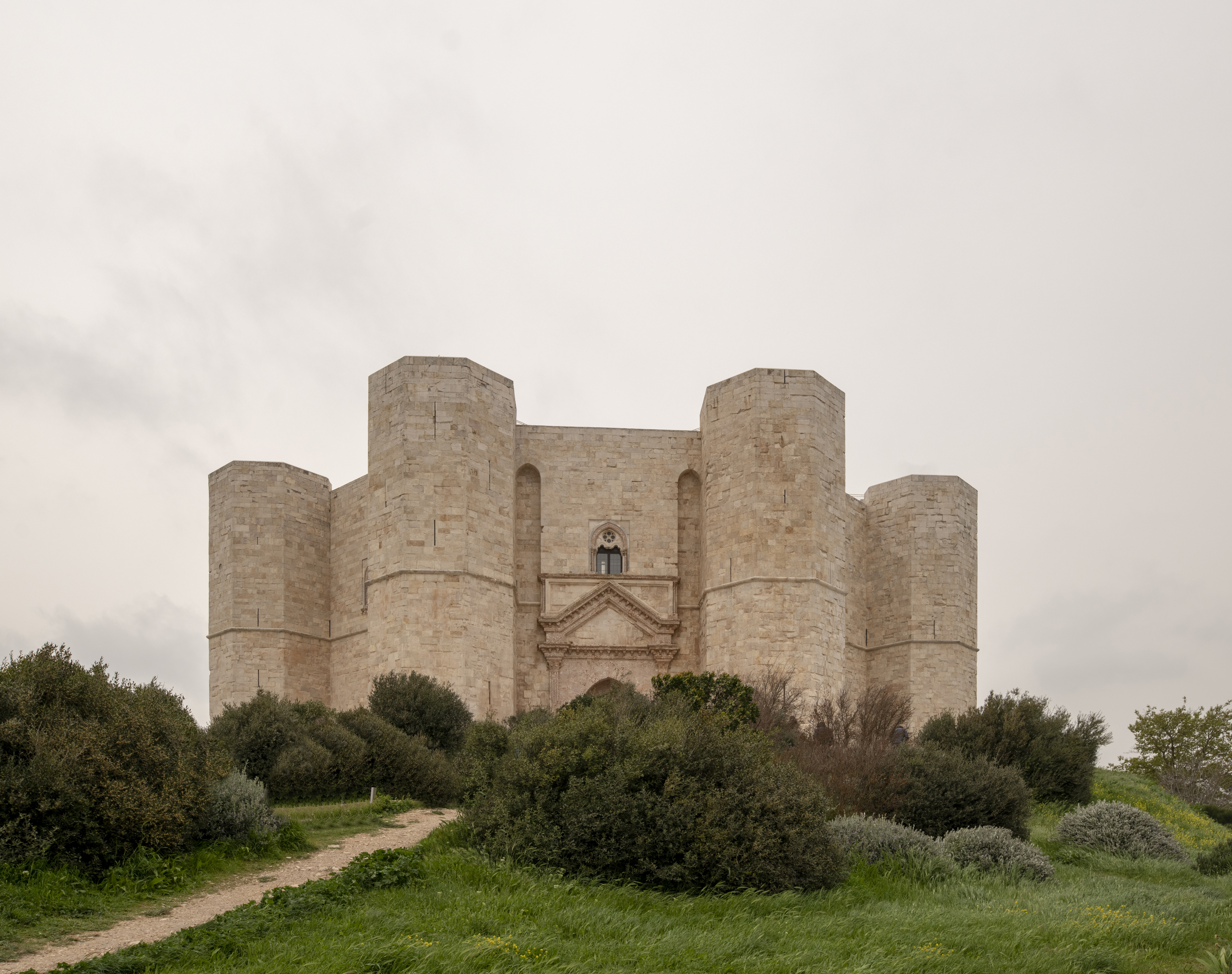
A video postcard introduced Intelligent Music Project's performance in the first semi-final of the Eurovision Song Contest 2022. The postcard was filmed at the Castel del Monte in Andria of Apulia and featured virtual projections of the band across the location.

According to Eurovision rules, all nations with the exceptions of the host country and the "Big Five" (France, Germany, Italy, Spain and the United Kingdom) are required to qualify from one of two semi-finals in order to compete for the final; the top ten countries from each semi-final progress to the final. The European Broadcasting Union (EBU) split up the competing countries into six different pots based on voting patterns from previous contests, with countries with favourable voting histories put into the same pot. On 25 January 2022, an allocation draw was held which placed each country into one of the two semi-finals, as well as which half of the show they would perform in. Bulgaria was placed into the first semi-final, which was held on 10 May 2022, and has been scheduled to perform in the first half of the show.

Once all the competing songs for the 2022 contest had been released, the running order for the semi-finals was decided by the shows' producers rather than through another draw, so that similar songs were not placed next to each other. Bulgaria was set to perform in position 7, following the entry from Ukraine and before the entry from the Netherlands.

In Bulgaria, all shows were broadcast on BNT 1 and BNT 4, with commentary by Elena Rosberg and Petko Kralev. BNT appointed Janan Dural as its spokesperson to announce the top 12-point score awarded by the Bulgarian jury during the final.

=== Semi-final ===
Intelligent Music Project took part in technical rehearsals on 30 April and 4 May, followed by dress rehearsals on 9 and 10 May. This included the jury show on 9 May where the professional juries of each country watched and voted on the competing entries.

The Bulgarian performance featured the entire band on stage dressed in black clothing. The performance was defined by constant pyrotechnics on stage and intricate patterns on gold coloured LED lights in the background. The band also used the secondary stage as well as the main stage for their performance.

At the end of the show, Bulgaria was not announced among the top 10 entries in the first semi-final and therefore failed to qualify to compete in the final. This was Bulgaria's first non-qualification to the grand final since returning to the contest after a two year absence in 2016. It was later revealed that Bulgaria placed sixteenth in the semi-final, receiving a total of 29 points: 18 points from the televoting and 11 points from the juries.

=== Voting ===
Below is a breakdown of points awarded to Bulgaria during the first semi-final. Voting during the three shows involved each country awarding two sets of points from 1-8, 10 and 12: one from their professional jury and the other from televoting. The exact composition of the professional jury, and the results of each country's jury and televoting were released after the final; the individual results from each jury member were also released in an anonymised form. The Bulgarian jury consisted of JJ, Mary, Nelly Markova Rangelova, VenZy, and Zdravko Tzokov Zheljazkov. In the first semi-final, Bulgaria finished in sixteenth place out of seventeen entries, marking Bulgaria's first non qualification to the final for the first time since 2013. The first semi-final saw Bulgaria receive twelve points from Albania in the televote. Over the course of the contest, Bulgaria awarded its 12 points to Switzerland (jury) and Ukraine (televote) in the first semi-final and Greece (jury) and Ukraine in the final.

==== Points awarded to Bulgaria ====
Points awarded to Bulgaria (Semi-final 1)
Score	Televote	Jury
12 points	Albania	
10 points		Greece
8 points		
7 points		
6 points		
5 points	Moldova	
4 points		
3 points		
2 points		
1 point	Greece	Albania

==== Points awarded by Bulgaria ====
Points awarded by Bulgaria (Semi-final 1)
Score	Televote	Jury
12 points	Ukraine	Switzerland
10 points	Armenia	Greece
8 points	Moldova	Armenia
7 points	Greece	Norway
6 points	Portugal	Croatia
5 points	Lithuania	Portugal
4 points	Norway	Netherlands
3 points	Netherlands	Latvia
2 points	Croatia	Denmark
1 point	Albania	Moldova

Points awarded by Bulgaria (Final)
Score	Televote	Jury
12 points	Ukraine	Greece
10 points	Serbia	United Kingdom
8 points	Spain	Spain
7 points	Moldova	Switzerland
6 points	Greece	Belgium
5 points	Armenia	Armenia
4 points	Romania	Portugal
3 points	United Kingdom	Azerbaijan
2 points	Italy	Norway
1 point	Norway	Italy

==== Detailed voting results ====
The following members comprised the Bulgarian jury:

- Georgi Simeonov – JJ – singer, music producer, represented Bulgaria in the 2018 contest as part of Equinox
- Maria Mutafchieva – Mary – singer-songwriter, musician
- Nelly Rangelova – singer-songwriter
- VenZy – musician, songwriter
- Zdravko Zhelyazkov – singer

Detailed voting results from Bulgaria (Semi-final 1)
R/O	Country	Jury							Televote	
R/O	Country	Juror A	Juror B	Juror C	Juror D	Juror E	Rank	Points	Rank	Points
01	Albania	16	16	16	16	16	16		10	1
02	Latvia	8	6	2	10	12	8	3	16	
03	Lithuania	9	14	14	14	14	12		6	5
04	Switzerland	3	1	5	1	1	1	12	12	
05	Slovenia	12	13	13	15	13	15		14	
06	Ukraine	11	10	12	7	9	11		1	12
07	Bulgaria									
08	Netherlands	7	11	8	5	3	7	4	8	3
09	Moldova	10	8	10	8	11	10	1	3	8
10	Portugal	4	7	9	9	4	6	5	5	6
11	Croatia	5	5	7	6	5	5	6	9	2
12	Denmark	6	9	6	11	6	9	2	13	
13	Austria	14	12	11	13	15	13		11	
14	Iceland	15	15	15	12	10	14		15	
15	Greece	1	4	1	2	7	2	10	4	7
16	Norway	13	2	4	4	8	4	7	7	4
17	Armenia	2	3	3	3	2	3	8	2	10

Detailed voting results from Bulgaria (Final)
R/O	Country	Jury							Televote	
R/O	Country	Juror 1	Juror 2	Juror 3	Juror 4	Juror 5	Rank	Points	Rank	Points
01	Czech Republic	20	10	6	12	21	13		24	
02	Romania	19	13	15	20	20	21		7	4
03	Portugal	7	9	5	11	4	7	4	13	
04	Finland	18	16	19	23	5	15		14	
05	Switzerland	5	3	8	5	1	4	7	25	
06	France	16	19	20	24	22	24		17	
07	Norway	15	5	9	7	17	9	2	10	1
08	Armenia	4	18	3	8	7	6	5	6	5
09	Italy	9	20	10	4	19	10	1	9	2
10	Spain	6	1	2	3	23	3	8	3	8
11	Netherlands	17	12	24	9	8	14		19	
12	Ukraine	24	25	25	17	13	23		1	12
13	Germany	8	22	21	13	12	16		21	
14	Lithuania	13	14	11	22	18	17		15	
15	Azerbaijan	12	7	4	14	6	8	3	23	
16	Belgium	3	4	7	10	9	5	6	20	
17	Greece	1	8	1	1	2	1	12	5	6
18	Iceland	23	24	22	25	25	25		22	
19	Moldova	10	21	23	19	16	19		4	7
20	Sweden	21	11	12	6	10	11		12	
21	Australia	11	6	18	21	11	12		18	
22	United Kingdom	2	2	13	2	3	2	10	8	3
23	Poland	22	17	17	15	24	22		16	
24	Serbia	25	15	16	18	14	20		2	10
25	Estonia	14	23	14	16	15	18		11	
