= Eurovision Song Contest 2022 =

International song competition

- The Sound of Beauty

Dates and venue
- Semi-final 1: 10 May 2022
- Semi-final 2: 12 May 2022
- Final: 14 May 2022
- Venue: Palasport Olimpico; Turin, Italy

Organisation
- Organiser: European Broadcasting Union (EBU)
- Executive supervisor: Martin Österdahl

Production
- Host broadcaster: Radiotelevisione italiana (RAI)
- Directors: Cristian Biondani; Duccio Forzano
- Executive producers: Claudio Fasulo; Simona Martorelli
- Presenters: Alessandro Cattelan; Laura Pausini; Mika

Participants
- Number of entries: 40
- Number of finalists: 25
- Returning countries: Armenia; Montenegro
- Non-returning countries: Russia (Suspended)
- Participation map: Finalist countries Countries eliminated in the semi-finals Countries that participated in the past but not in 2022

Vote
- Voting system: Each country awards two sets of 12, 10, 8–1 points to ten songs.
- Winning song: Ukraine "Stefania"

The Eurovision Song Contest 2022 was the 66th edition of the Eurovision Song Contest. It consisted of two semi-finals on 10 and 12 May and a final on 14 May 2022, held at the Palasport Olimpico in Turin, Italy, and presented by Alessandro Cattelan, Laura Pausini and Mika. It was organised by the European Broadcasting Union (EBU) and host broadcaster Radiotelevisione italiana (RAI), which staged the event after winning the 2021 contest for Italy with the song "Zitti e buoni" by Måneskin.

Broadcasters from forty countries participated in the contest, with Armenia and Montenegro returning after their absence from the previous edition. Russia had originally planned to participate, but was excluded due to its invasion of Ukraine.

The winner was Ukraine with the song "Stefania", performed by Kalush Orchestra and written by the group's members Ihor Didenchuk, Oleh Psiuk, Tymofii Muzychuk and Vitalii Duzhyk, along with Ivan Klymenko. The United Kingdom finished in second place for a record-extending sixteenth time, also achieving its best result since 1998. Spain, Sweden and Serbia rounded out the top five, with Spain achieving its best result since 1995. Ukraine won the televote with 439 points, the most received in the contest's history to date, and came fourth in the jury vote behind the United Kingdom, Sweden and Spain. "Stefania" is the first song sung entirely in Ukrainian and the first song with hip-hop elements to win the contest.

The EBU reported that the contest had a television audience of 161 million viewers in 34 European markets, a decrease of 22 million viewers from the previous edition, however, it is noted that this is due to the exclusion of Russia and the lack of audience figures from Ukraine, with the overall figures up by 7 million viewers in a comparable market from 2021. An increase of three per cent in the 15–24 year old age range was also reported. A total of 18 million viewers watched the contest online on YouTube and TikTok.

== Location ==
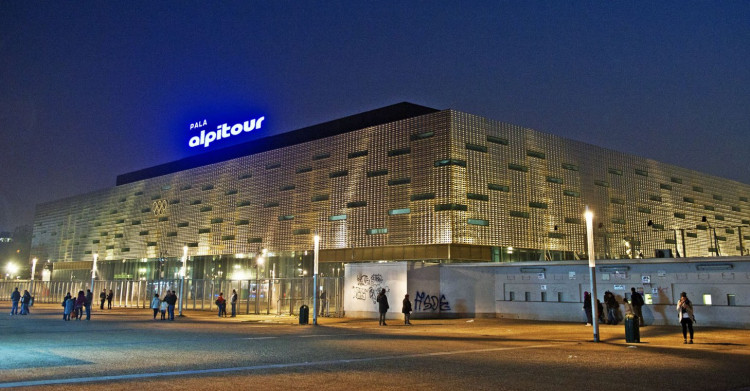
Palasport Olimpico, Turin – host venue of the 2022 contest.

Location of host venue (red) and other contest-related sites and events (blue)

The 2022 contest took place in Turin, Italy, following the country's victory at the 2021 edition with the song "Zitti e buoni", performed by Måneskin. It was the third time that Italy had hosted the contest, having previously done so for the 1965 and 1991 contests, held in Naples and Rome respectively. The selected venue was the 13,300-seat Palasport Olimpico, a multi-purpose indoor arena located in the Santa Rita district, which serves as a venue for events including concerts, exhibitions, trade fairs, conferences, and sports (mainly those requiring an ice rink, such as ice hockey and curling). PalaOlimpico had previously hosted the ice hockey events at the 2006 Winter Olympics, and the opening ceremonies of the 2007 Winter Universiade and hosted the same event in 2025.

The venue was at full capacity for the contest, after the previous edition in Rotterdam saw a limited audience of 3,500 people as a precaution against the COVID-19 pandemic. However, the audience in Turin was required to wear masks at all times inside the venue, unlike in Rotterdam where mask-wearing was not enforced whenever the audience was seated. Nearly all COVID-19 prevention measures for the contest were dropped by 11 May 2022, the day before the second semi-final, with testing only required whenever symptoms were exhibited.

In addition to the main venue, the host city also organised side events in tandem with the contest. The Eurovision Village was the official Eurovision Song Contest fan and sponsors area during the event weeks, where it was possible to watch performances by contest participants and local artists, as well as the live shows broadcast from the main venue. It was located at Parco del Valentino and open from 7 to 14 May 2022. The EuroClub, which took place across ten different locations in Turin, hosted the official after-parties and private performances by contest participants. Unlike in previous years, access to the EuroClub was not restricted to accredited fans, delegates and press. The "Turquoise Carpet" and Opening Ceremony events, where the contestants and their delegations were presented before the accredited press and fans, took place at the Palace of Venaria on 8 May 2022.

=== Bidding phase ===
Location of the selected host city (in blue), shortlisted cities (in green), other bidding cities (in red) and cities that expressed interest but ultimately did not bid (in grey)

Between 23 and 28 May 2021, many cities across Italy expressed interest in hosting the contest. Representatives from the cities of Bologna, Milan, Pesaro, Naples and Turin voiced their interest, as well as the Mayor of Reggio Emilia, Luca Vecchi, who hoped to host the contest in the new RCF Arena, the largest open-air arena in Europe with a capacity of 100,000 spectators. The mayors of Rome, Rimini and Florence soon after also expressed interest in hosting the contest and were joined by Sanremo, Verona and Bari. Marco Di Maio, member of the Italian Chamber of Deputies, also suggested that if Rimini were to host the contest, it should be a co-production with San Marino RTV.

Host broadcaster RAI launched the bidding process on 7 July 2021. In the first phase of this process, any interested cities were to present their bid through certified email by 12 July, after which RAI and the EBU would proceed to send all of them a bid book with more detailed requirements for the cities to submit their plans for review.

On 9 July 2021, the city of Turin officially announced its bid. On the same day, the city of Pesaro did the same, proposing the Vitrifrigo Arena as a possible venue to host the event. They were followed by Bologna and Jesolo on 12 July, and Rimini and Bertinoro (jointly with Forlì and Cesena) on 13 July. On 13 July, RAI announced that 17 cities had submitted their bid for hosting the contest and would be provided the following day with the bid books. They had until 4 August to draft and submit their detailed plans, which 11 cities did. On 24 August, it was reported that Bologna, Milan, Pesaro, Rimini and Turin would be the cities left in the running to host the contest.

The choice among them was meant to be announced by the end of August; however, this did not materialise, and in mid-September Stefano Coletta, director of Rai 1, stated that the selection was behind time to ensure "transparency and precision". On 8 October 2021, the EBU and RAI announced Turin as the host city, with the PalaOlimpico as the chosen venue for the contest.

Key: † Host venue ‡ Shortlisted Presented the bid book

City	Venue	Notes		Ref.
Acireale	PalaTupparello	—		
Alessandria	Cittadella	Proposal was dependent on the construction of a roof to cover the area; would have needed renovation works.		
Bertinoro	PalaGalassi	Candidacy supported by Forlì, Cesena and the Legislative Assembly of Emilia-Romagna.		
Bologna	Fiera di Bologna ‡	Candidacy supported by the Legislative Assembly of Emilia-Romagna.		
Bologna	Unipol Arena	Candidacy supported by the Legislative Assembly of Emilia-Romagna.		
Florence	Nelson Mandela Forum	Candidacy supported by the Regional Council of Tuscany.		
Genoa	Palasport di Genova	Was undergoing renovation works.		
Jesolo	Palazzo del Turismo	Did not meet the EBU requirements of size.		
Jesolo	Piave Vecchia Lighthouse area	Proposal was dependent on the construction of a roof to cover the area.		
Matera	Cava del Sole	Proposal was dependent on the construction of a roof to cover the area.		
Milan	Mediolanum Forum	Did not meet the EBU requirements of size.	Candidacy supported by the regional government of Lombardy.	
Milan	Palazzo delle Scintille ‡	Would have needed adjustment works.	Candidacy supported by the regional government of Lombardy.	
Palazzolo Acreide	Ad hoc arena to be built	Would have needed the cooperation of other municipalities in Syracuse.		
Pesaro	Vitrifrigo Arena ‡	—		
Rimini	Rimini Fiera ‡	Candidacy supported by the Legislative Assembly of Emilia-Romagna.		
Rome	PalaLottomatica	—		
Rome	Fiera di Roma	Did not meet the EBU requirements of capacity.		
Sanremo	Mercato dei Fiori	—		
Trieste	PalaTrieste	Did not meet the EBU requirements of size.		
Trieste	Stadio Nereo Rocco	Proposal was dependent on the construction of a roof to cover the stadium.		
Turin	PalaOlimpico †	Hosted the ice hockey events at the 2006 Winter Olympics and the opening ceremony of the 2007 Winter Universiade; from 2021 to 2025, it will host the tennis ATP Finals. Candidacy supported by the Turin city council and the Regional Council of Piedmont.		
Viterbo	Fiera di Viterbo	Did not meet the EBU requirements of size; would have needed renovation works.		

== Participants ==
Eurovision Song Contest 2022 – Participation summaries by country
- Albania; Armenia; Australia; Austria; Azerbaijan; Belgium; Bulgaria; Croatia; Cyprus; Czech Republic; Denmark; Estonia; Finland; France; Georgia; Germany; Greece; Iceland; Ireland; Israel; Italy; Latvia; Lithuania; Malta; Moldova; Montenegro; Netherlands; North Macedonia; Norway; Poland; Portugal; Romania; ~~Russia~~; San Marino; Serbia; Slovenia; Spain; Sweden; Switzerland; Ukraine; United Kingdom

Eligibility for potential participation in the Eurovision Song Contest requires a national broadcaster with active EBU membership capable of receiving the contest via the Eurovision network and broadcasting it live nationwide. The EBU issued an invitation to participate in the contest to all active members. Associate member Australia did not need an invitation for the 2022 contest, as it had previously been granted permission to participate at least until 2023.

On 20 October 2021, the EBU initially announced that 41 countries would participate in the 2022 contest. The list included all countries that participated in the 2021 contest, along with Armenia and Montenegro, both of which had last taken part in 2019 (Armenia was also set to compete in the cancelled 2020 edition). On 25 February 2022, the EBU announced that Russia was excluded from the contest due to its invasion of Ukraine, thereby reducing the number of participating countries to 40.

The contest featured five representatives who also previously performed as lead artists for the same country. Nika Kocharov, the guitarist of Circus Mircus, had previously represented Georgia in 2016 alongside Young Georgian Lolitaz; (Note: Kocharov's identity was not publicly known at the time of the contest.) Stoyan Yankoulov, a member of Intelligent Music Project, had represented Bulgaria in 2007 and 2013 alongside Elitsa Todorova; Zdob și Zdub had represented Moldova in 2005 and 2011; Mahmood had represented Italy in 2019; and Ihor Didenchuk, a member of Kalush Orchestra, had previously represented Ukraine in 2021 as a member of Go_A. In addition, Ihan Haydar, who had previously represented Denmark in 2012 as a member of Soluna Samay's backup band, returned as a member of Reddi.

Eurovision Song Contest 2022 participants
Country	Broadcaster	Artist	Song	Language	Songwriter(s)
Albania	RTSH	Ronela Hajati	"Sekret"	Albanian, English	Ronela Hajati
Armenia	AMPTV	Rosa Linn	"Snap"	English	Allie Crystal; Jeremy Dusolet; Courtney Harrell; Tamar Mardirossian Kaprelian; Larzz Principato; Rosa Linn
Australia	SBS	Sheldon Riley	"Not the Same"	English	Cam Nacson; Sheldon Riley Hernandez
Austria	ORF	Lumix feat. Pia Maria	"Halo"	English	Rasmus Flyckt; Luca Michlmayr; Anders Nilsen; Gabry Ponte; Sophie Alexandra Tweed-Simmons
Azerbaijan	İTV	Nadir Rustamli	"Fade to Black"	English	Sebastian Schub; Thomas Stengaard; Andreas Stone; Anderz Wrethov
Belgium	RTBF	Jérémie Makiese	"Miss You"	English	Silvio Lisbonne; Jérémie Makiese; Mike BGRZ; Manon Romiti
Bulgaria	BNT	Intelligent Music Project	"Intention"	English	MD; Milen Vrabevski
Croatia	HRT	Mia Dimšić	"Guilty Pleasure"	English, Croatian	Damir Bačić; Mia Dimšić; Vjekoslav Dimter
Cyprus	CyBC	Andromache	"Ela" (Έλα)	English, Greek	Arash Labaf; Yll Limani; Fatjon Miftaraj; Eyelar Mirzazadeh; Alex Papaconstantinou; George Papadopoulos; Filloreta Raçi Fifi; Viktor Svensson; Robert Uhlmann
Czech Republic	ČT	We Are Domi	"Lights Off"	English	Einar Eriksen Kvaløy; Dominika Hašková; Casper Hatlestad; Abigail Frances Jones; Benjamin Rekstad
Denmark	DR	Reddi	"The Show"	English	Julia Fabrin; Remee Jackman; Ihan Haydar; Lars Pedersen; Siggy Savery
Estonia	ERR	Stefan	"Hope"	English	Stefan Airapetjan; Karl-Ander Reismann
Finland	Yle	The Rasmus	"Jezebel"	English	Desmond Child; Lauri Ylönen
France	France Télévisions	Alvan and Ahez	"Fulenn"	Breton	Marine Lavigne; Alexis Morvan Rosius
Georgia	GPB	Circus Mircus	"Lock Me In"	English	Circus Mircus
Germany	NDR (Note: On behalf of the German public broadcasting consortium ARD)	Malik Harris	"Rockstars"	English	Malik Harris; Robin Karow; Marianne Kobylka
Greece	ERT	Amanda Georgiadi Tenfjord	"Die Together"	English	Amanda Georgiadi Tenfjord; Bjørn Helge Gammelsæter
Iceland	RÚV	Systur	"Með hækkandi sól"	Icelandic	Lovísa Elísabet Sigrúnardóttir
Ireland	RTÉ	Brooke	"That's Rich"	English	Brooke Scullion; Izzy Warner; Karl Zine
Israel	IPBC	Michael Ben David	"I.M"	English	Chen Aharoni; Lidor Saadia; Asi Tal
Italy	RAI	Mahmood and Blanco	"Brividi"	Italian	Riccardo Fabbriconi; Alessandro Mahmoud; Michele "Michelangelo" Zocca
Latvia	LTV	Citi Zēni	"Eat Your Salad"	English	Jānis "JJ Lush" Jačmenkins; Roberts Memmēns; Jānis Pētersons; Dagnis Roziņš
Lithuania	LRT	Monika Liu	"Sentimentai"	Lithuanian	Monika Luibinaitė
Malta	PBS	Emma Muscat	"I Am What I Am"	English	Julie Aagaard; Dino Medanhodžić; Emma Muscat; Stine Kinck
Moldova	TRM	Zdob și Zdub and Advahov Brothers	"Trenulețul"	Romanian, English	Vasile Advahov; Vitalie Advahov; Andrei Cebotari; Mihai Gîncu; Roman Iagupov; Sveatoslav Staruș
Montenegro	RTCG	Vladana	"Breathe"	English, Italian	Darko Dimitrov; Vladana Vučinić
Netherlands	AVROTROS	S10	"De diepte"	Dutch	Stien den Hollander; Arno Krabman
North Macedonia	MRT	Andrea	"Circles"	English	Andrea Koevska; Aleksandar Masevski
Norway	NRK	Subwoolfer	"Give That Wolf a Banana"	English	Ben Adams; Gaute Ormåsen
Poland	TVP	Ochman	"River"	English	Ashley Hicklin; Krystian Ochman; Mikołaj Trybulec; Adam Wiśniewski
Portugal	RTP	Maro	"Saudade, saudade"	English, Portuguese	John Blanda; Mariana Brito da Cruz Forjaz Secca
Romania	TVR	Wrs	"Llámame"	English, Spanish	Costel Dominteanu; Cezar Gună; Alexandru Turcu; Andrei Ursu
San Marino	SMRTV	Achille Lauro	"Stripper"	Italian, English	Gregorio "Greg" Calculli; Matteo "Gow Tribe" Ciceroni; Mattia "Banf" Cutolo; Federico De Marinis; Lauro De Marinis; Daniele Dezi; Marco "Lancs" Lanciotti; Simon Pietro Manzari; Daniele Mungai; Davide Petrella; Francesco Viscovo
Serbia	RTS	Konstrakta	"In corpore sano"	Serbian, Latin	Milovan Bošković; Ana Đurić
Slovenia	RTVSLO	LPS	"Disko"	Slovene	Gašper Hlupič; Mark Semeja; Zala Velenšek; Filip Vidušin; Žiga Žvižej
Spain	RTVE	Chanel	"SloMo"	Spanish, English	Keith Harris; Ibere Fortes; Leroy Sánchez; Maggie Szabo; Arjen Thonen
Sweden	SVT	Cornelia Jakobs	"Hold Me Closer"	English	Cornelia Jakobsdotter; Isa Molin; David Zandén
Switzerland	SRG SSR	Marius Bear	"Boys Do Cry"	English	Marius Hügli; Martin Gallop
Ukraine	UA:PBC	Kalush Orchestra	"Stefania" (Стефанія)	Ukrainian	Ihor Didenchuk; Vitalii Duzhyk; Ivan Klymenko; Tymofii Muzychuk; Oleh Psiuk
United Kingdom	BBC	Sam Ryder	"Space Man"	English	Sam Ryder; Amy Wadge; Max Wolfgang

=== Other countries ===
==== Active EBU members ====
Active EBU member broadcasters in Andorra, Bosnia and Herzegovina, Luxembourg, Monaco and Slovakia confirmed non-participation prior to the announcement of the participants list by the EBU. Turkish national broadcaster TRT had been in talks with the EBU about a potential return to the contest in 2022, but the country ultimately did not appear on the final list of participants.

==== Non-EBU members ====
Belarus was excluded from participation in the 2022 contest on 1 July 2021, when the EBU Executive Board agreed to expel its national broadcaster BTRC as a result of its use as a propaganda tool, losing the rights to broadcast and participate in any Eurovision event until 1 July 2024. Conversely, Russia initially appeared on the list of participants; however, following its invasion of Ukraine in February 2022 and subsequent protests from other participating countries, the EBU decided to exclude the country from the contest; Russian member broadcasters, including VGTRK and Channel One, immediately responded by announcing their withdrawal from the union, which was finalised on 26 May 2022 and resulted in Russia indefinitely losing broadcasting and participation rights for future Eurovision events.

Liechtensteiner broadcaster 1FLTV, despite previous attempts to become an EBU member, halted its plans after director Peter Kölbel's unexpected death, and did not resume them due to the lack of sufficient funds and of government support.

== Production ==
The Eurovision Song Contest 2022 was produced by the Italian public broadcaster Radiotelevisione italiana (RAI). Claudio Fasulo and Simona Martorelli served as executive producers, Cristian Biondani and Duccio Forzano served as directors of the three live shows, Claudio Santucci served as head of show, and Emanuele Cristofoli served as artistic director for the opening and interval acts. Background music for the shows was composed by Maurizio Filardo.

The Italian government allocated around €1.5 million as part of the budget needed to host the event, while the municipality of Turin and the regional government of Piedmont contributed around €10 million in total. The preliminary total budget for the shows was €16.3 million. The full costs was not officially published, but is estimated to be at approximately €22 million.

=== Visual design ===
The theme art and slogan for the contest, "The Sound of Beauty", was unveiled on 21 January 2022. Designed by Rome-based studio Flopicco, the artwork was built around the symmetrical structure and patterns of cymatics to convey the visual properties of sound, which also reflects Italian garden design, while the typography, Arsenica, was inspired by early-20th century Italian poster art; the colours were drawn from those of the Italian flag.

=== Stage design ===
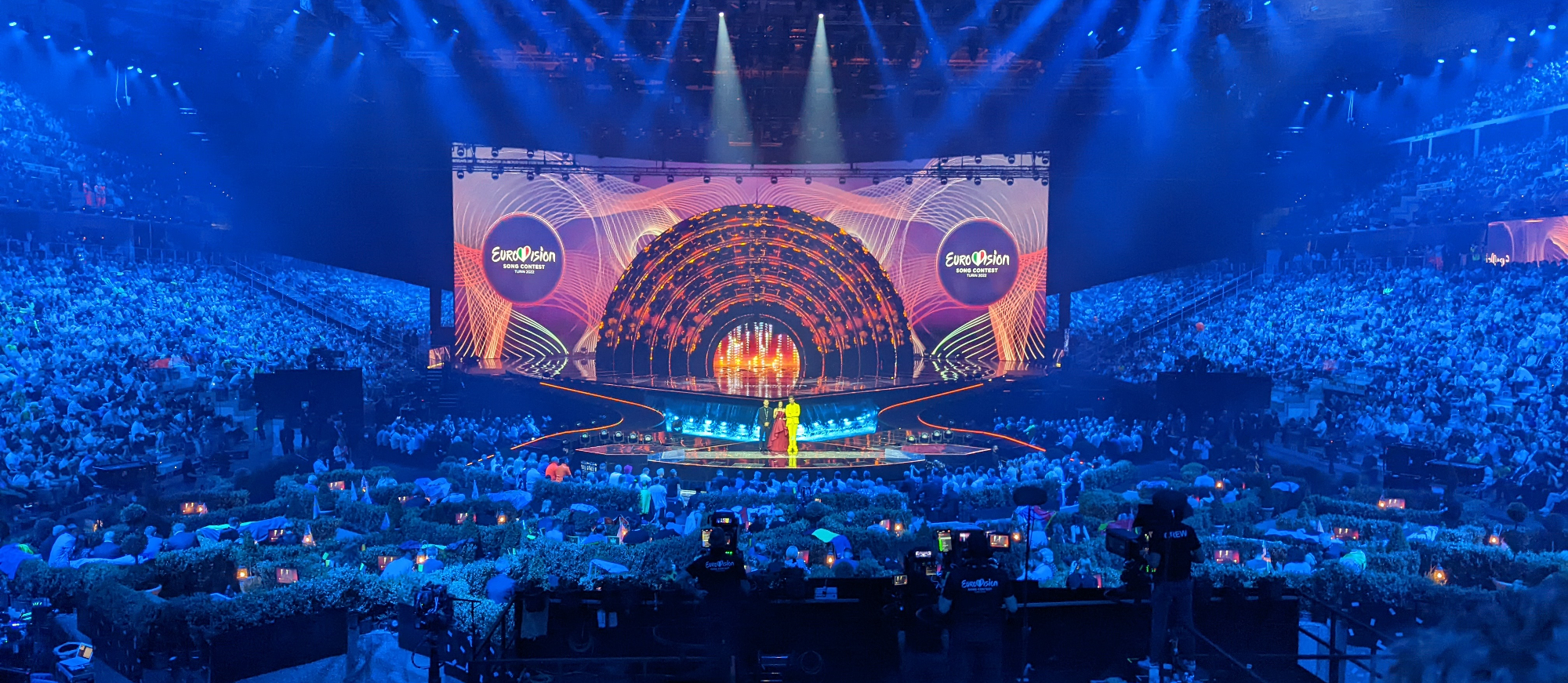
Stage and green room in the arena

The stage design for the 2022 contest was revealed on 18 February 2022. Designed by Rome-based stage designer Francesca Montinaro and dubbed "The Sun Within", the stage design was based around the movements and light of a kinetic sun, with the intended ability to showcase theatrical motion. The design also featured a working water cascade and a green room modelled after an Italian garden. Montinaro had previous experience in stage design, having done so for the Sanremo Music Festival in 2013 and 2019. This marked the first time since 2016 that German stage designer Florian Wieder did not design the Eurovision stage.

=== Postcards ===
The "postcards" were 40-second video introductions shown on television whilst the stage is being prepared for the next contestant to perform their entry. Filmed between February and April, and directed by Matteo Lanzi, each postcard for 2022 showcased a different locale in Italy adorned by pictures and various artistic elements related to the acts, while the participating artists themselves appeared via footage superimposed through chroma keying, guided by a drone named "Leo". The following locations were used for each participating country:

- Albania – Su Nuraxi, Barumini, Sardinia
- Armenia – Marmore Falls, Terni, Umbria
- Australia – MART, Rovereto, Trentino-South Tyrol
- Austria – Miramare Castle, Trieste, Friuli-Venezia Giulia
- Azerbaijan – Villa Monastero, Varenna, Lombardy
- Belgium – Perugia, Umbria
- Bulgaria – Castel del Monte, Andria, Apulia
- Croatia – Grinzane Cavour, Cuneo, Piedmont
- Cyprus – Matterhorn, Aosta Valley
- Czech Republic – Caserta, Campania
- Denmark – Procida, Naples, Campania
- Estonia – Sacra di San Michele, Sant'Ambrogio di Torino, Piedmont
- Finland – Laghi di Fusine, Udine, Friuli-Venezia Giulia
- France – Cavour, Piedmont
- Georgia – Burano, Venice, Veneto
- Germany – Lingotto, Turin, Piedmont
- Greece – Selinunte, Trapani, Sicily
- Iceland – Cortina d'Ampezzo, Belluno, Veneto
- Ireland – Matera, Basilicata
- Israel – Manarola, Cinque Terre, Liguria
- Italy – Mole Antonelliana, Turin, Piedmont
- Latvia – Merano, Trentino-South Tyrol
- Lithuania – Bergamo, Lombardy
- Malta – Abbey of San Galgano, Siena, Tuscany
- Moldova – Urbino, Marche
- Montenegro – Monte Conero, Ancona, Marche
- Netherlands – Ravenna, Emilia-Romagna
- North Macedonia – Cala Luna, Nuoro, Sardinia
- Norway – Lago di Scanno, L'Aquila, Abruzzo
- Poland – Scala dei Turchi, Agrigento, Sicily
- Portugal – Genoa, Liguria
- Romania – Isola di Capo Rizzuto, Crotone, Calabria
- San Marino – Rome, Lazio
- Serbia – Castle of Rocca Calascio, L'Aquila, Abruzzo
- Slovenia – Civita di Bagnoregio, Viterbo, Lazio
- Spain – Alagna Valsesia, Vercelli, Piedmont
- Sweden – Rimini, Emilia-Romagna
- Switzerland – Termoli, Campobasso, Molise
- Ukraine – Florence, Tuscany
- United Kingdom – Orta San Giulio, Novara, Piedmont

=== Presenters ===
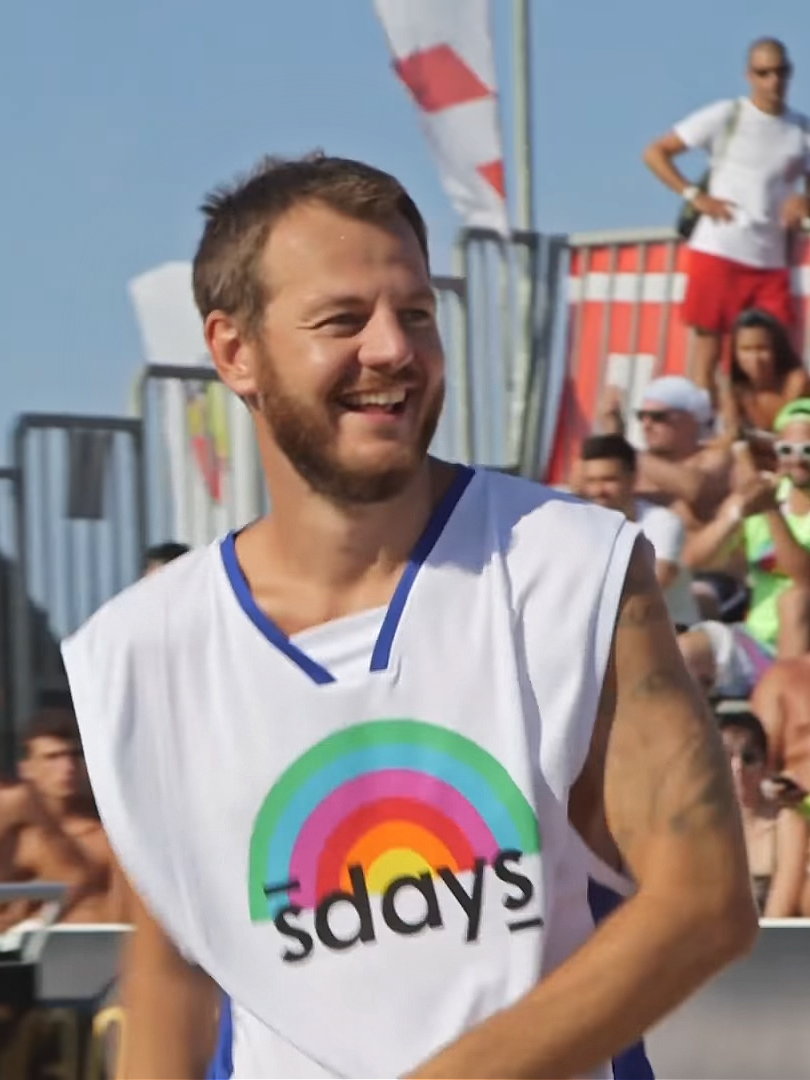
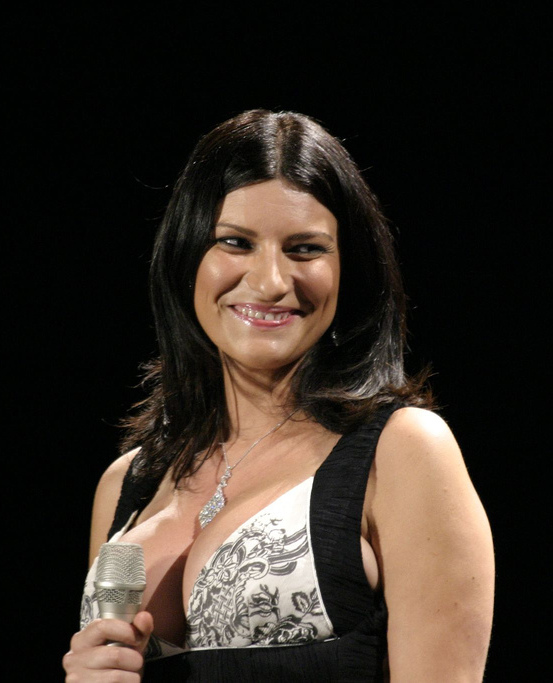
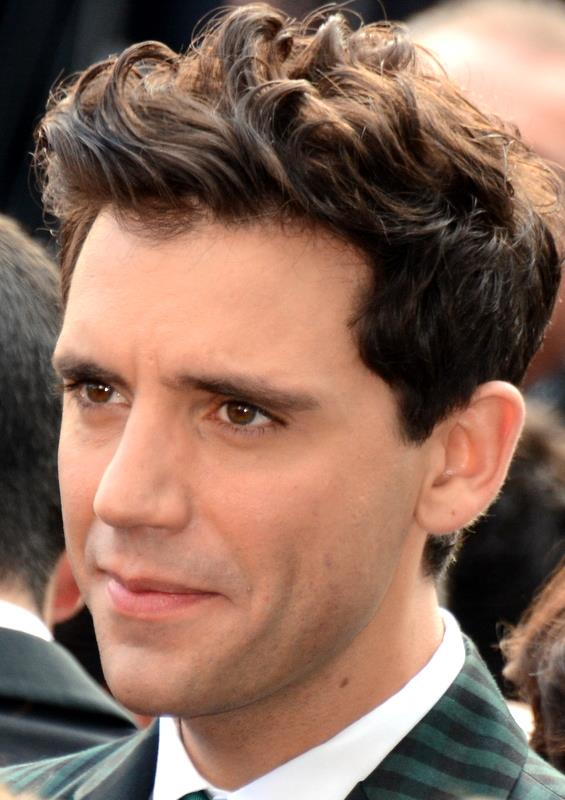
Alessandro Cattelan, Laura Pausini and Mika, presenters of the 2022 contest

Television presenter Alessandro Cattelan and singers Laura Pausini and Mika were the presenters of the 2022 contest. They had already been named as likely hosts by Italian news agency Adnkronos and TV magazine TV Sorrisi e Canzoni; and were officially confirmed during the second night of the Sanremo Music Festival 2022 on 2 February, after appearing on that show as special guests.

The "Turquoise Carpet" and Opening Ceremony events were hosted by Gabriele Corsi, Carolina Di Domenico, Mario Acampa and Laura Carusino. Acampa, Carusino and Di Domenico also moderated the contest's press conferences.

== Format ==
=== Entries ===
For the second year in a row, delegations had the option to use pre-recorded backing vocals, though each delegation could still use backing singers – whether on or off stage – or a combination of live and recorded backing vocals. However, all lead vocals performing the melody of the song must still be live. The EBU also required all national broadcasters to create a 'live-on-tape' backup recording prior to the contest which could be used if a participant was unable to travel to Turin, or subjected to quarantine on arrival. The 2022 contest also saw a tightening of the rules around song eligibility. Previously, the rules stated that the competing songs must not have been commercially released prior to 1 September of the previous year, now, a song may be ineligible to compete if it has been released to the public in any way, including live performances, before 1 September of the previous year. Enforcement of the rule was subject to the responsibility of the participating broadcasters.

With all participating artists having performed live in Turin, the majority of the 'live-on-tape' performances were released on the contest's official YouTube channel over a period of ten days, from 14 to 23 June 2022. Australia, Azerbaijan, Cyprus, the Czech Republic, Georgia, Italy, Moldova, the Netherlands, Norway, Sweden, and the United Kingdom opted not to release their performances, while Ukraine was exempted from the obligation to record its own, and Armenia and Austria removed theirs after release for unknown reasons. Despite Montenegro not releasing its performance to the contest's official channel, it was nonetheless made available on the channel of the country's representative Vladana.

The 2022 contest was the first edition to not feature any competing song with lyrics in French.

=== Semi-final allocation draw ===
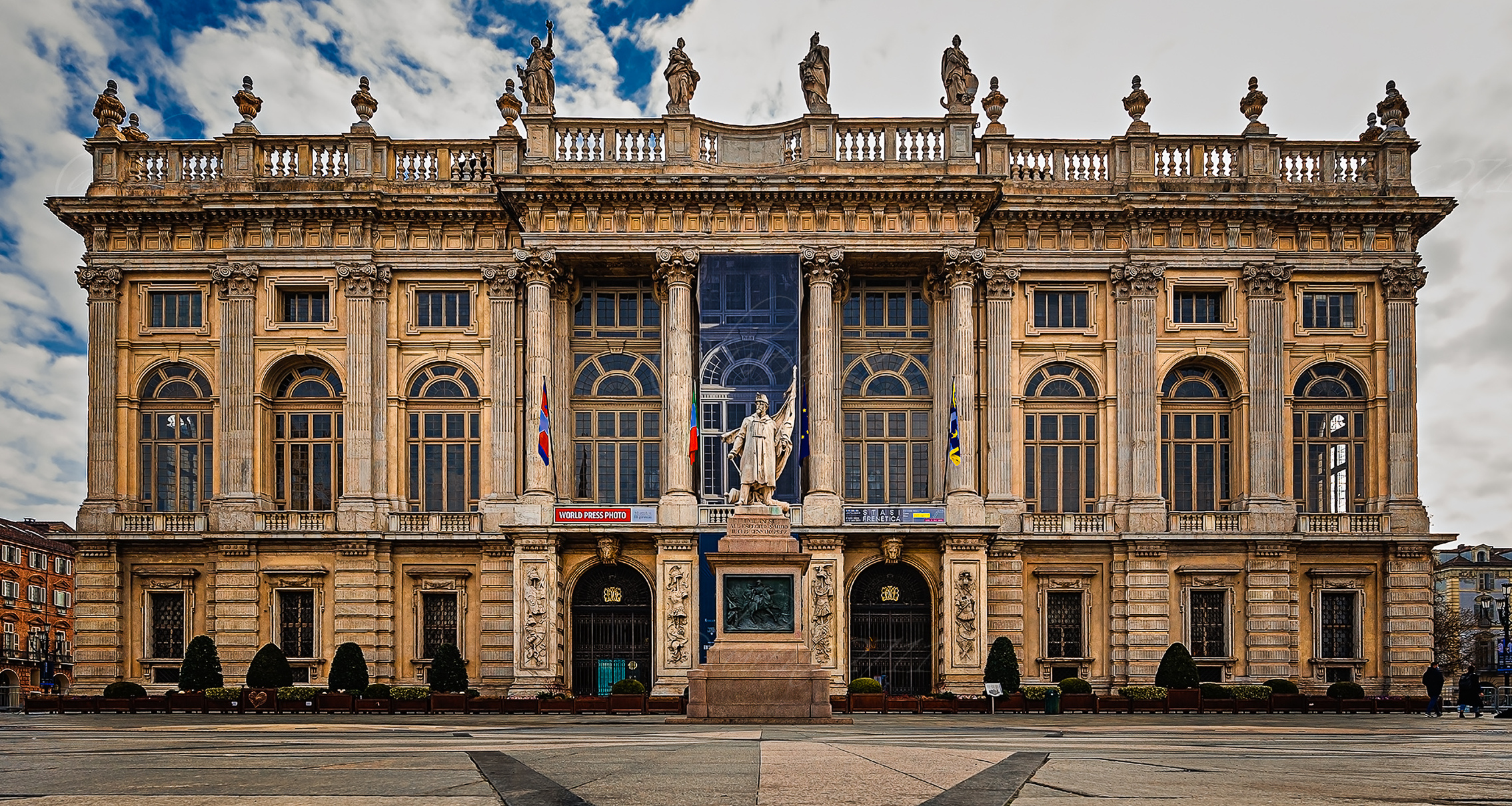
Palazzo Madama, host venue for the allocation draw of the 2022 contest

Results of the semi-final allocation draw Participating countries in the first semi-final (Note: Russia, which had originally been allocated into semi-final 1, was excluded from the contest in February 2022.) Pre-qualified for the final but also voting in the first semi-final Participating countries in the second semi-final Pre-qualified for the final but also voting in the second semi-final

The draw to determine the participating countries' semi-finals took place on 25 January 2022 at 12:00 CET, at Palazzo Madama. The thirty-six semi-finalists were divided over six pots, based on historical voting patterns as calculated by the contest's official televoting partner Digame. The purpose of drawing from different pots was to reduce the chance of "bloc voting" and to increase suspense in the semi-finals. The draw also determined which semi-final each of the five automatic qualifiers – "Big Five" countries France, Germany, Italy, Spain and the United Kingdom – would broadcast and vote in. The ceremony was hosted by Carolina Di Domenico and Mario Acampa, with Acampa replacing Gabriele Corsi who tested positive for COVID-19. It included the passing of the host city insignia from Ahmed Aboutaleb, then-mayor of previous host city Rotterdam, to Stefano Lo Russo, the mayor of Turin.

Pot 1	Pot 2	Pot 3	Pot 4	Pot 5	Pot 6
Albania; Croatia; Montenegro; North Macedonia; Serbia; Slovenia	Australia; Denmark; Finland; Iceland; Norway; Sweden	Armenia; Azerbaijan; Georgia; Israel; ~~Russia~~; Ukraine	Bulgaria; Cyprus; Greece; Malta; Portugal; San Marino	Estonia; Latvia; Lithuania; Moldova; Poland; Romania	Austria; Belgium; Czech Republic; Ireland; Netherlands; Switzerland

== Contest overview ==
=== Semi-final 1 ===
The first semi-final took place on 10 May 2022 at 21:00 (CEST). Seventeen countries participated in this semi-final, with the running order published on 29 March 2022. Ukraine won the most points, followed by the Netherlands, Greece, Portugal, Armenia, Norway, Lithuania, Moldova, Switzerland, and Iceland. The countries that failed to reach the final were Croatia, Albania, Denmark, Latvia, Austria, Bulgaria, and Slovenia. All the countries competing in this semi-final were eligible to vote, plus France and Italy. Russia was originally allocated to participate in the second half of this semi-final, but was excluded from the contest due to its invasion of Ukraine.

This semi-final was opened by a performance showcasing Italian ingenuity and creativity, accompanied by the official anthem of the contest, "The Sound of Beauty", performed by Sherol Dos Santos, while the interval featured a medley of past hits by Italian artists titled "The Dance of Beauty" (Note: Namely, in order of appearance: "Horizon in Your Eyes", "Chase", "Tenebre", "Children", "L'Amour toujours", "Blue (Da Ba Dee)", "Satisfaction" and "Golden Nights") performed by Dardust, Benny Benassi, and Sophie and the Giants with flutist Sylvia Catasta, a brief homage to Raffaella Carrà by the contest presenters, and Diodato performing "Fai rumore", his intended entry for Italy in 2020. The French and Italian artists were then interviewed, and clips of their competing songs were played.

Qualifiers

Results of the first semi-final of the Eurovision Song Contest 2022
R/O	Country	Artist	Song	Points	Place
1	Albania	Ronela Hajati	"Sekret"	58	12
2	Latvia	Citi Zēni	"Eat Your Salad"	55	14
3	Lithuania	Monika Liu	"Sentimentai"	159	7
4	Switzerland	Marius Bear	"Boys Do Cry"	118	9
5	Slovenia	LPS	"Disko"	15	17
6	Ukraine	Kalush Orchestra	"Stefania"	337	1
7	Bulgaria	Intelligent Music Project	"Intention"	29	16
8	Netherlands	S10	"De diepte"	221	2
9	Moldova	Zdob și Zdub and Advahov Brothers	"Trenulețul"	154	8
10	Portugal	Maro	"Saudade, saudade"	208	4
11	Croatia	Mia Dimšić	"Guilty Pleasure"	75	11
12	Denmark	Reddi	"The Show"	55	13
13	Austria	Lumix feat. Pia Maria	"Halo"	42	15
14	Iceland	Systur	"Með hækkandi sól"	103	10
15	Greece	Amanda Georgiadi Tenfjord	"Die Together"	211	3
16	Norway	Subwoolfer	"Give That Wolf a Banana"	177	6
17	Armenia	Rosa Linn	"Snap"	187	5

=== Semi-final 2 ===
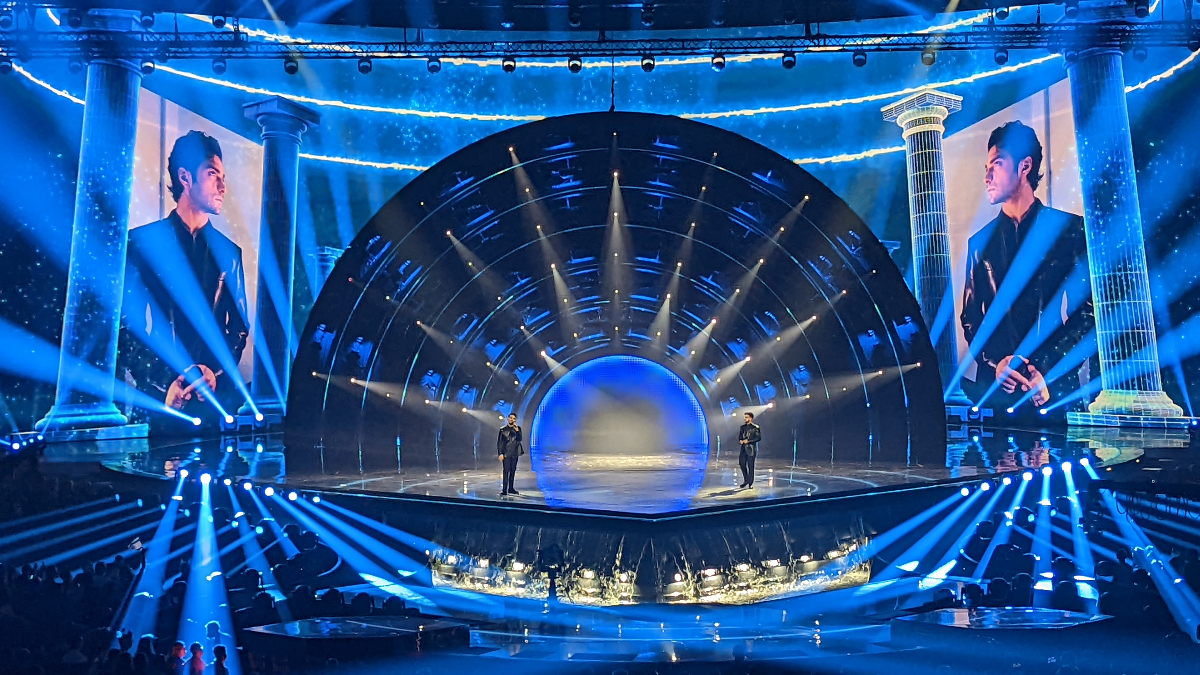
Il Volo performed as an interval act in the second semi-final.

The second semi-final took place on 12 May 2022 at 21:00 (CEST). Eighteen countries participated in this semi-final, with the running order published on 29 March 2022. Sweden won the most points, followed by Australia, Serbia, the Czech Republic, Estonia, Poland, Finland, Belgium, Romania, and Azerbaijan. The countries that failed to reach the final were North Macedonia, Cyprus, Israel, San Marino, Ireland, Malta, Montenegro, and Georgia. All the countries competing in this semi-final were eligible to vote, plus Germany, Spain and the United Kingdom.

This semi-final was opened by "The Italian Way", an act built around Italian improvisation performed by co-presenter Alessandro Cattelan, while the interval featured a medley of "Fragile" and "People Have the Power" performed by co-presenters Laura Pausini and Mika, and Il Volo performing a new version of "Grande amore", their entry for Italy in 2015. (Note: Gianluca Ginoble appeared remotely due to testing positive for COVID-19, while Ignazio Boschetto and Piero Barone performed on stage.) The British, German, and Spanish artists were then interviewed, and clips of their competing songs were played.

Qualifiers

Results of the second semi-final of the Eurovision Song Contest 2022
R/O	Country	Artist	Song	Points	Place
1	Finland	The Rasmus	"Jezebel"	162	7
2	Israel	Michael Ben David	"I.M"	61	13
3	Serbia	Konstrakta	"In corpore sano"	237	3
4	Azerbaijan	Nadir Rustamli	"Fade to Black"	96	10
5	Georgia	Circus Mircus	"Lock Me In"	22	18
6	Malta	Emma Muscat	"I Am What I Am"	47	16
7	San Marino	Achille Lauro	"Stripper"	50	14
8	Australia	Sheldon Riley	"Not the Same"	243	2
9	Cyprus	Andromache	"Ela"	63	12
10	Ireland	Brooke	"That's Rich"	47	15
11	North Macedonia	Andrea	"Circles"	76	11
12	Estonia	Stefan	"Hope"	209	5
13	Romania	Wrs	"Llámame"	118	9
14	Poland	Ochman	"River"	198	6
15	Montenegro	Vladana	"Breathe"	33	17
16	Belgium	Jérémie Makiese	"Miss You"	151	8
17	Sweden	Cornelia Jakobs	"Hold Me Closer"	396	1
18	Czech Republic	We Are Domi	"Lights Off"	227	4

=== Final ===
The final took place on 14 May 2022 at 21:00 (CEST). Twenty-five countries participated in the final, with all forty participating countries eligible to vote. The running order for the final was published on 13 May 2022. Ukraine won with 631 points, also winning the televote. The United Kingdom came second with 466 points and won the jury vote, with Spain, Sweden, Serbia, Italy, Moldova, Greece, Portugal, and Norway completing the top ten. Finland, the Czech Republic, Iceland, France, and Germany occupied the bottom five positions.

The final was opened by the Rockin'1000 performing "Give Peace a Chance" and co-presenter Laura Pausini performing a medley of her songs "Benvenuto", "Io canto", "La solitudine", "Le cose che vivi", and "Scatola", followed by the traditional flag parade, introducing all twenty-five finalists. The interval acts included 2021 winners Måneskin performing their new single "Supermodel" and a cover of "If I Can Dream", Gigliola Cinquetti performing her winning song for Italy in 1964, "Non ho l'età", and co-presenter Mika performing a medley of his songs "Love Today", "Grace Kelly", new single "Yo Yo", and "Happy Ending". Astronaut Samantha Cristoforetti appeared in a pre-recorded message from the International Space Station.

Results of the final of the Eurovision Song Contest 2022
R/O	Country	Artist	Song	Points	Place
1	Czech Republic	We Are Domi	"Lights Off"	38	22 (Note: Despite finishing with the same number of points as the Czech Republic, Finland finished in twenty-first place due to receiving a greater number of points in the televote.)
2	Romania	Wrs	"Llámame"	65	18
3	Portugal	Maro	"Saudade, saudade"	207	9
4	Finland	The Rasmus	"Jezebel"	38	21
5	Switzerland	Marius Bear	"Boys Do Cry"	78	17
6	France	Alvan and Ahez	"Fulenn"	17	24
7	Norway	Subwoolfer	"Give That Wolf a Banana"	182	10
8	Armenia	Rosa Linn	"Snap"	61	20
9	Italy	Mahmood and Blanco	"Brividi"	268	6
10	Spain	Chanel	"SloMo"	459	3
11	Netherlands	S10	"De diepte"	171	11
12	Ukraine	Kalush Orchestra	"Stefania"	631	1
13	Germany	Malik Harris	"Rockstars"	6	25
14	Lithuania	Monika Liu	"Sentimentai"	128	14
15	Azerbaijan	Nadir Rustamli	"Fade to Black"	106	16
16	Belgium	Jérémie Makiese	"Miss You"	64	19
17	Greece	Amanda Georgiadi Tenfjord	"Die Together"	215	8
18	Iceland	Systur	"Með hækkandi sól"	20	23
19	Moldova	Zdob și Zdub and Advahov Brothers	"Trenulețul"	253	7
20	Sweden	Cornelia Jakobs	"Hold Me Closer"	438	4
21	Australia	Sheldon Riley	"Not the Same"	125	15
22	United Kingdom	Sam Ryder	"Space Man"	466	2
23	Poland	Ochman	"River"	151	12
24	Serbia	Konstrakta	"In corpore sano"	312	5
25	Estonia	Stefan	"Hope"	141	13

==== Spokespersons ====
The spokespersons announced the 12-point score from their respective country's national jury in the following order:

1. Netherlands – Jeangu Macrooy
2. San Marino – Labiuse
3. North Macedonia – Jana Burčeska
4. Malta – Aidan
5. Ukraine – Kateryna Pavlenko
6. Albania – Andri Xhahu
7. Estonia – Tanel Padar
8. Azerbaijan – None (Note: Narmin Salmanova was supposed to announce the jury points from Azerbaijan, but due to alleged technical difficulties, the contest's executive supervisor Martin Österdahl announced them instead.)
9. Portugal – Pedro Tatanka
10. Germany – Barbara Schöneberger
11. Belgium – David Jeanmotte
12. Norway – Tix
13. Israel – Daniel Styopin
14. Poland – Ida Nowakowska
15. Greece – Stefania
16. Moldova – Elena Băncilă
17. Bulgaria – Janan Dural
18. Serbia – Dragana Kosjerina
19. Iceland – Árný Fjóla Ásmundsdóttir
20. Cyprus – Loukas Hamatsos
21. Latvia – Samanta Tīna
22. Spain – Nieves Álvarez
23. Switzerland – Julie Berthollet
24. Denmark – Tina Müller
25. France – Élodie Gossuin
26. Armenia – Garik Papoyan
27. Montenegro – Andrijana Vešović (Zombijana)
28. Romania – None (Note: Eda Marcus was supposed to announce the jury points from Romania, but due to alleged technical difficulties, the contest's executive supervisor Martin Österdahl announced them instead.)
29. Ireland – Linda Martin
30. Slovenia – Lorella Flego
31. Georgia – None (Note: Helen Kalandadze was supposed to announce the jury points from Georgia, but due to alleged technical difficulties, the contest's executive supervisor Martin Österdahl announced them instead.)
32. Croatia – Ivan Dorian Molnar
33. Lithuania – Vaidotas Valiukevičius
34. Austria – Philipp Hansa
35. Finland – Aksel
36. United Kingdom – AJ Odudu
37. Sweden – Dotter
38. Australia – Courtney Act
39. Czech Republic – Taťána Kuchařová
40. Italy – Carolina Di Domenico

== Detailed voting results ==
=== Semi-final 1 ===
Qualifiers

Split results of semi-final 1
Place	Combined		Jury		Televoting	
Place	Country	Points	Country	Points	Country	Points
1	Ukraine	337	Greece	151	Ukraine	202
2	Netherlands	221	Netherlands	142	Moldova	135
3	Greece	211	Ukraine	135	Armenia	105
4	Portugal	208	Portugal	121	Norway	104
5	Armenia	187	Switzerland	107	Lithuania	103
6	Norway	177	Armenia	82	Portugal	87
7	Lithuania	159	Norway	73	Netherlands	79
8	Moldova	154	Iceland	64	Greece	60
9	Switzerland	118	Lithuania	56	Albania	46
10	Iceland	103	Croatia	42	Iceland	39
11	Croatia	75	Latvia	39	Austria	36
12	Albania	58	Denmark	35	Croatia	33
13	Denmark	55 (Note: Despite finishing with the same number of points as Latvia, Denmark finished in thirteenth place due to receiving a greater number of points in the televote.)	Moldova	19	Denmark	20
14	Latvia	55	Albania	12	Bulgaria	18
15	Austria	42	Bulgaria	11	Latvia	16
16	Bulgaria	29	Slovenia	7	Switzerland	11
17	Slovenia	15	Austria	6	Slovenia	8

The ten qualifiers from the first semi-final were determined by televoting and/or SMS-voting (50%) and five-member juries (50%). All seventeen countries competing in the first semi-final voted, alongside France and Italy. The ten qualifying countries were announced in no particular order, and the full results of how each country voted was published after the final had been held.

Detailed jury voting results of semi-final 1
Voting procedure used: 100% televoting; 100% jury vote		Total score	Jury score	Televoting score	Jury vote																		
Voting procedure used: 100% televoting; 100% jury vote		Total score	Jury score	Televoting score	Albania	Latvia	Lithuania	Switzerland	Slovenia	Ukraine	Bulgaria	Netherlands	Moldova	Portugal	Croatia	Denmark	Austria	Iceland	Greece	Norway	Armenia	France	Italy
Contestants	Albania	58	12	46															12				
Contestants	Latvia	55	39	16			2	2	3		3		4	12		1	1	4	4		2		1
Contestants	Lithuania	159	56	103		1		3	12			2		6	10	5		8		5		2	2
Contestants	Switzerland	118	107	11	6	4	10		4	6	12	7	10	4	6	6	7	5		4	5	5	6
Contestants	Slovenia	15	7	8								1	1		5								
Contestants	Ukraine	337	135	202	12	12	12	8	7			8	12	7	7	7		10	3	6	7	10	7
Contestants	Bulgaria	29	11	18	1														10				
Contestants	Netherlands	221	142	79	10	3	8	12	10	12	4		2	8	2	12	8	7	6	8	12	8	10
Contestants	Moldova	154	19	135			1			2	1			1					7	1	1		5
Contestants	Portugal	208	121	87	4	5	7	4	6	8	5	10	5		12	8	10	6	5	10	10	6	
Contestants	Croatia	75	42	33	3				8	3	6	3					3		8		4		4
Contestants	Denmark	55	35	20		6	5	5		5	2				3		5	1		3			
Contestants	Austria	42	6	36															2			1	3
Contestants	Iceland	103	64	39	5	8	4	6		4		5	3	10	4	4	2			2	3	4	
Contestants	Greece	211	151	60	8	10	6	10	5	7	10	12	8	5	8	10	6	2		12	8	12	12
Contestants	Norway	177	73	104	2	7	3	7	2	1	7	6	7	2		3	4	12	1		6	3	
Contestants	Armenia	187	82	105	7	2		1	1	10	8	4	6	3	1	2	12	3		7		7	8

Detailed televoting results of semi-final 1
Voting procedure used: 100% televoting; 100% jury vote		Total score	Jury score	Televoting score	Televote																		
Voting procedure used: 100% televoting; 100% jury vote		Total score	Jury score	Televoting score	Albania	Latvia	Lithuania	Switzerland	Slovenia	Ukraine	Bulgaria	Netherlands	Moldova	Portugal	Croatia	Denmark	Austria	Iceland	Greece	Norway	Armenia	France	Italy
Contestants	Albania	58	12	46				8	6		1				2		2		12		2	5	8
Contestants	Latvia	55	39	16			10			5		1											
Contestants	Lithuania	159	56	103	1	10		3	5	12	5	5	6	6	6	8	4	5	5	8	7	6	1
Contestants	Switzerland	118	107	11			3					2				1	3	1			1		
Contestants	Slovenia	15	7	8											8								
Contestants	Ukraine	337	135	202	8	12	12	10	10		12	12	12	12	12	12	12	12	10	10	12	10	12
Contestants	Bulgaria	29	11	18	12								5						1				
Contestants	Netherlands	221	142	79	3	3	6	2	3	6	3		8	8	3	4	5	8	4	1	4	4	4
Contestants	Moldova	154	19	135		8	7	7	7	10	8	10		10	10	6	10	7	6	6	6	7	10
Contestants	Portugal	208	121	87	5	6	8	12	2	4	6	6	4		1	3	1	2	3	2	8	8	6
Contestants	Croatia	75	42	33	6			6	12		2			1			6						
Contestants	Denmark	55	35	20		2	1		1				3	3				6		4			
Contestants	Austria	42	6	36	4	1		4		3			2		4	2		4	2	3	5		2
Contestants	Iceland	103	64	39		5	2	1		8		4		2		7				7		3	
Contestants	Greece	211	151	60	10				8	1	7	3	1	4						12	10	1	3
Contestants	Norway	177	73	104	2	7	5		4	7	4	7	10	7	7	10	7	10	7		3	2	5
Contestants	Armenia	187	82	105	7	4	4	5		2	10	8	7	5	5	5	8	3	8	5		12	7

==== 12 points ====
Below is a summary of all 12 points received in the first semi-final. In the jury vote, Greece, the Netherlands, and Ukraine each received the maximum score of 12 points from four countries, while Albania, Armenia, Latvia, Lithuania, Norway, Portugal, and Switzerland were each awarded one set of 12 points. In the public vote, Ukraine received the maximum score of 12 points from twelve countries, with Albania, Armenia, Bulgaria, Croatia, Greece, Lithuania, and Portugal each receiving one set of 12 points.

12 points awarded by juries
#	Recipient	Countries giving 12 points
4	Netherlands	Armenia, Denmark, Switzerland, Ukraine
4	Ukraine	Albania, Latvia, Lithuania, Moldova
4	Greece	France, Italy, Netherlands, Norway
1	Albania	Greece
1	Armenia	Austria
1	Latvia	Portugal
1	Lithuania	Slovenia
1	Norway	Iceland
1	Portugal	Croatia
1	Switzerland	Bulgaria

12 points awarded by televoting
#	Recipient	Countries giving 12 points
12	Ukraine	Austria, Armenia, Bulgaria, Croatia, Denmark, Iceland, Italy, Latvia, Lithuania, Moldova, Netherlands, Portugal
1	Albania	Greece
1	Armenia	France
1	Bulgaria	Albania
1	Croatia	Slovenia
1	Greece	Norway
1	Lithuania	Ukraine
1	Portugal	Switzerland

=== Semi-final 2 ===
Qualifiers

Split results of semi-final 2
Place	Combined		Jury		Televoting	
Place	Country	Points	Country	Points	Country	Points
1	Sweden	396	Sweden	222	Sweden	174 (Note: Despite finishing with the same number of points as Serbia, Sweden finished in first place in the televoting due to receiving points from a greater number of countries.)
2	Australia	243	Australia	169	Serbia	174
3	Serbia	237	Estonia	113	Czech Republic	125
4	Czech Republic	227	Belgium	105	Poland	114
5	Estonia	209	Czech Republic	102	Romania	100
6	Poland	198	Azerbaijan	96	Finland	99
7	Finland	162	Poland	84	Estonia	96
8	Belgium	151	Finland	63 (Note: Despite finishing with the same number of points as Serbia, Finland finished in eighth place in the jury vote due to receiving points from a greater number of countries.)	Australia	74
9	Romania	118	Serbia	63	Cyprus	54
10	Azerbaijan	96	North Macedonia	56	Belgium	46
11	North Macedonia	76	Israel	34	Ireland	35
12	Cyprus	63	Malta	27	San Marino	29
13	Israel	61	San Marino	21	Israel	27
14	San Marino	50	Romania	18	Montenegro	22
15	Ireland	47 (Note: Despite finishing with the same number of points as Malta, Ireland finished in fifteenth place due to receiving a greater number of points in the televote.)	Georgia	13	Malta	20 (Note: Despite finishing with the same number of points as North Macedonia, Malta finished in fifteenth place in the televoting due to receiving points from a greater number of countries.)
16	Malta	47	Ireland	12	North Macedonia	20
17	Montenegro	33	Montenegro	11	Georgia	9
18	Georgia	22	Cyprus	9	Azerbaijan	0

The ten qualifiers from the second semi-final were determined by televoting and/or SMS-voting (50%) and five-member juries (50%). All eighteen countries competing in the second semi-final voted, alongside Germany, Spain, and the United Kingdom. The ten qualifying countries were announced in no particular order, and the full results of how each country voted was published after the final had been held.

Detailed jury voting results of semi-final 2
Voting procedure used: 100% televoting; 100% jury vote		Total score	Jury score	Televoting score	Jury vote																				
Voting procedure used: 100% televoting; 100% jury vote		Total score	Jury score	Televoting score	Finland	Israel	Serbia	Azerbaijan	Georgia	Malta	San Marino	Australia	Cyprus	Ireland	North Macedonia	Estonia	Romania	Poland	Montenegro	Belgium	Sweden	Czech Republic	Germany	Spain	United Kingdom
Contestants	Finland	162	63	99		5	5	4	3	3	3		2		4	8	4	4	4	5	4	2	1	2	
Contestants	Israel	61	34	27				1		2		10		3			1	1		7	3		2	3	1
Contestants	Serbia	237	63	174	8	1		3	2		2	4	5	7	12				7	2				5	5
Contestants	Azerbaijan	96	96	0	7		8		4	4	4	3	6		1	6	3	3	5	3	5	4	10	12	8
Contestants	Georgia	22	13	9						1		1				3						5	3		
Contestants	Malta	47	27	20		2		2	1		1			6	6	1					7	1			
Contestants	San Marino	50	21	29	5												2	2		12					
Contestants	Australia	243	169	74	10	10	2	10	10	10	10		10	5	5	10	10	10	10	8	12	8	6	10	3
Contestants	Cyprus	63	9	54	3									4							2				
Contestants	Ireland	47	12	35								6	1			4				1					
Contestants	North Macedonia	76	56	20	2		1			5		7		1			5	5	1			10	12		7
Contestants	Estonia	209	113	96	4	3	10	7	7	8	7	5	7	8	2		7	7	6		10	7	4		4
Contestants	Romania	118	18	100		4										2							8	4	
Contestants	Poland	198	84	114	1	8	3	8	8	6	8		8		8				3	6	1	3		7	6
Contestants	Montenegro	33	11	22			7								3									1	
Contestants	Belgium	151	105	46		7	6	5	5		5	8	3	2	10	5	6	6	8		8	6	5	8	2
Contestants	Sweden	396	222	174	12	12	12	12	12	12	12	12	12	12	7	12	12	12	12	10		12	7	6	12
Contestants	Czech Republic	227	102	125	6	6	4	6	6	7	6	2	4	10		7	8	8	2	4	6				10

Detailed televoting results of semi-final 2
Voting procedure used: 100% televoting; 100% jury vote		Total score	Jury score	Televoting score	Televote																				
Voting procedure used: 100% televoting; 100% jury vote		Total score	Jury score	Televoting score	Finland	Israel	Serbia	Azerbaijan	Georgia	Malta	San Marino	Australia	Cyprus	Ireland	North Macedonia	Estonia	Romania	Poland	Montenegro	Belgium	Sweden	Czech Republic	Germany	Spain	United Kingdom
Contestants	Finland	162	63	99			1	5	6	6	3	2	2	1	8	12	4	6		4	12	10	7	6	4
Contestants	Israel	61	34	27				10	10		2											3	2		
Contestants	Serbia	237	63	174	8	8			12	12	12	12	12	4	12	4	10	7	12	6	10	12	10	5	6
Contestants	Azerbaijan	96	96	0																					
Contestants	Georgia	22	13	9	2	5						1				1									
Contestants	Malta	47	27	20			2	3					1	3	3	3			1	2	2				
Contestants	San Marino	50	21	29	4					8		5					2	4						3	3
Contestants	Australia	243	169	74	6	6		7	2	7	7		4	7		5	3	2	3	3	4	5	3		
Contestants	Cyprus	63	9	54			10	12	1	1	4				5		7	3	8		1			1	1
Contestants	Ireland	47	12	35		3				3		8								1		1		7	12
Contestants	North Macedonia	76	56	20			8												10			2			
Contestants	Estonia	209	113	96	12	4	4		7			3	3	6	1		8	10	7	7	8	8	4	2	2
Contestants	Romania	118	18	100	3	2	6	6	5	5	8	4	10	5		2		5		8	3	4	5	12	7
Contestants	Poland	198	84	114	5	7		1	3	4	5	6	8	12	2	6	1		2	12	7	7	12	4	10
Contestants	Montenegro	33	11	22			12								10										
Contestants	Belgium	151	105	46	1	1	3	4			1		6	2	4	7	5	1	5		5		1		
Contestants	Sweden	396	222	174	10	12	5	8	8	10	10	10	7	10	7	10	12	12	6	10		6	8	8	5
Contestants	Czech Republic	227	102	125	7	10	7	2	4	2	6	7	5	8	6	8	6	8	4	5	6		6	10	8

==== 12 points ====
Below is a summary of all 12 points received in the second semi-final. In the jury vote, Sweden received the maximum score of 12 points from sixteen countries, while Australia, Azerbaijan, North Macedonia, San Marino, and Serbia were each awarded one set of 12 points. In the public vote, Serbia received the maximum score of 12 points from eight countries, with Poland and Sweden receiving three sets of 12 points. Finland were awarded two sets of 12 points, and Cyprus, Estonia, Ireland, Montenegro, and Romania were each awarded one set of 12 points.

12 points awarded by juries
#	Recipient	Countries giving 12 points
16	Sweden	Australia, Azerbaijan, Cyprus, Czech Republic, Estonia, Finland, Georgia, Ireland, Israel, Malta, Montenegro, Poland, Romania, San Marino, Serbia, United Kingdom
1	Australia	Sweden
1	Azerbaijan	Spain
1	North Macedonia	Germany
1	San Marino	Belgium
1	Serbia	North Macedonia

12 points awarded by televoting
#	Recipient	Countries giving 12 points
8	Serbia	Australia, Cyprus, Czech Republic, Georgia, Malta, Montenegro, North Macedonia, San Marino
3	Poland	Belgium, Germany, Ireland
3	Sweden	Israel, Poland, Romania
2	Finland	Estonia, Sweden
1	Cyprus	Azerbaijan
1	Estonia	Finland
1	Ireland	United Kingdom
1	Montenegro	Serbia
1	Romania	Spain

=== Final ===
Winner

Split results of the final
Place	Combined		Jury		Televoting	
Place	Country	Points	Country	Points	Country	Points
1	Ukraine	631	United Kingdom	283	Ukraine	439
2	United Kingdom	466	Sweden	258	Moldova	239
3	Spain	459	Spain	231	Spain	228
4	Sweden	438	Ukraine	192	Serbia	225
5	Serbia	312	Portugal	171	United Kingdom	183
6	Italy	268	Greece	158 (Note: Despite finishing with the same number of points as Italy, Greece finished in sixth place in the jury vote due to receiving a greater individual score from one country, as both countries received points from the same number of national juries.)	Sweden	180
7	Moldova	253	Italy	158	Norway	146
8	Greece	215	Netherlands	129	Italy	110
9	Portugal	207	Australia	123	Poland	105
10	Norway	182	Azerbaijan	103	Estonia	98
11	Netherlands	171	Serbia	87	Lithuania	93
12	Poland	151	Switzerland	78	Greece	57
13	Estonia	141	Belgium	59	Romania	53
14	Lithuania	128	Poland	46	Netherlands	42
15	Australia	125	Estonia	43	Portugal	36
16	Azerbaijan	106	Armenia	40	Finland	26
17	Switzerland	78	Norway	36	Armenia	21
18	Romania	65	Lithuania	35	Iceland	10
19	Belgium	64	Czech Republic	33	France	8
20	Armenia	61	Moldova	14	Germany	6
21	Finland	38	Romania	12 (Note: Despite finishing with the same number of points as Finland, Romania finished in twenty-first place in the jury vote due to receiving a greater individual score from one country, as both countries received points from the same number of national juries.)	Belgium	5 (Note: Despite finishing with the same number of points as the Czech Republic, Belgium finished in twenty-first place in the televoting due to receiving points from a greater number of countries.)
22	Czech Republic	38	Finland	12	Czech Republic	5
23	Iceland	20	Iceland	10	Azerbaijan	3
24	France	17	France	9	Australia	2
25	Germany	6	Germany	0	Switzerland	0

The results of the final were determined by televoting and jury voting in all forty participating countries. The announcement of the jury points was conducted by each country individually, with the country's spokesperson announcing their jury's favourite entry that received 12 points, with the remaining points shown on screen. Following the completion of the jury points announcement, the public points were announced as an aggregate by the contest hosts in ascending order starting from the country which received the fewest points from the jury.

Detailed jury voting results of the final
Voting procedure used: 100% televoting; 100% jury vote		Total score	Jury score	Televoting score	Jury vote																																							
Voting procedure used: 100% televoting; 100% jury vote		Total score	Jury score	Televoting score	Netherlands	San Marino	North Macedonia	Malta	Ukraine	Albania	Estonia	Azerbaijan	Portugal	Germany	Belgium	Norway	Israel	Poland	Greece	Moldova	Bulgaria	Serbia	Iceland	Cyprus	Latvia	Spain	Switzerland	Denmark	France	Armenia	Montenegro	Romania	Ireland	Slovenia	Georgia	Croatia	Lithuania	Austria	Finland	United Kingdom	Sweden	Australia	Czech Republic	Italy
Contestants	Czech Republic	38	33	5				3	1						2		2		2			3	2						2				7								5	4		
Contestants	Romania	65	12	53										1					7							4																		
Contestants	Portugal	207	171	36	8				10	1	7	7			5	10		7	3	2	4	7	5		6		5	8	1	8	4	7	4	3	7	10	8	10		3		6	5	
Contestants	Finland	38	12	26							5											6																						1
Contestants	Switzerland	78	78	0	10	1	1		6				2	2		1		5		7	7				3	1		2				5		5		1	7	1		2			6	3
Contestants	France	17	9	8								1																		7					1									
Contestants	Norway	182	36	146	3									3							2		8		5		1											5	4		3		2	
Contestants	Armenia	61	40	21					2	4			1			4					5								7									6	1		2			8
Contestants	Italy	268	158	110		3	7	7		12	10	10			8		8	4	1		1		6	1		10	2			10	10	4	6	12	10	4	4	3	2			3		
Contestants	Spain	459	231	228	5	12	12	12		5		5	12	8	10	7	3	1	5	3	8	4	3	6			8	4	5	12	8	1	12	1	5	6	5	2		10	12	12	7	
Contestants	Netherlands	171	129	42					8	6	1	4	7	4		5	1	3	4				4		4		10	10	4	4	3	3		7	4	2	6	8	5					12
Contestants	Ukraine	631	192	439		2				7		6	8	10	6	3	7	12		12			10	7	12		3	5	10	6	6	12	3	8	6	8	12					7	4	
Contestants	Germany	6	0	6																																								
Contestants	Lithuania	128	35	93							2		5			2						2	1		1			3			2			10		7								
Contestants	Azerbaijan	106	103	3		7	4	2	5	3	3			6	3				12	1	3	12		10		12					1								3	7	7	2		
Contestants	Belgium	64	59	5	6		3			2							4			4	6	8		2		5			6												1	5		7
Contestants	Greece	215	158	57	12	10		1	7		6	3	4			12		2			12			12	7	2	12	12	3	2		2		4	3	3		4	6	4			3	10
Contestants	Iceland	20	10	10									6															1					1				2							
Contestants	Moldova	253	14	239	2														6											1														5
Contestants	Sweden	438	258	180	1	5	6	10	4	8	12	8		7	7	8	12	10		8		5	12	5	10	7	7	7		5	7	10	10		8	5	3	7	12	12		10	10	
Contestants	Australia	125	123	2	7	6	5	6	3		8			5	1		5	6	8	6				8	2	8	4					6	2						8	6	10		1	2
Contestants	United Kingdom	466	283	183	4	8	8	8	12	10	4	12	10	12	12	6	10	8		10	10	1	7	3	8	3	6	6	12		5	8	8	2	12		10	12	10		8		12	6
Contestants	Poland	151	46	105		4	2	4				2					6		10										8						2					8				
Contestants	Serbia	312	87	225			10						3		4									4		6					12		5	6		12	1		7	1	4	8		4
Contestants	Estonia	141	43	98				5												5		10								3										5	6	1	8	

Detailed televoting results of the final
Voting procedure used: 100% televoting; 100% jury vote		Total score	Jury score	Televoting score	Televote																																							
Voting procedure used: 100% televoting; 100% jury vote		Total score	Jury score	Televoting score	Netherlands	San Marino	North Macedonia	Malta	Ukraine	Albania	Estonia	Azerbaijan	Portugal	Germany	Belgium	Norway	Israel	Poland	Greece	Moldova	Bulgaria	Serbia	Iceland	Cyprus	Latvia	Spain	Switzerland	Denmark	France	Armenia	Montenegro	Romania	Ireland	Slovenia	Georgia	Croatia	Lithuania	Austria	Finland	United Kingdom	Sweden	Australia	Czech Republic	Italy
Contestants	Czech Republic	38	33	5			5																																					
Contestants	Romania	65	12	53		1		3											2	10	4	5		4		10			1				2							3				8
Contestants	Portugal	207	171	36											1			1								4	7		6	4	5						7							1
Contestants	Finland	38	12	26				1	4	2	8														1										2						7		1	
Contestants	Switzerland	78	78	0																																								
Contestants	France	17	9	8															1	2		2										1				1			1					
Contestants	Norway	182	36	146	5	2	2	4	2		4	7	2	1			4	4	6	6	1	8	10		5	3		8			2	2	4	3		5	2	5	6	6	10	10	3	4
Contestants	Armenia	61	40	21																	5			1					5						10									
Contestants	Italy	268	158	110		5	6	10		8		5	3	3	4		3		7		2	4		5		5	8		3		6	4		6		6	3	3				1		
Contestants	Spain	459	231	228	7	10	10	7	1	7	1	10	10	2	6	1	8	6	12	8	8	10	3	8	4		6	1	7	8	8	8	5	4	6	7	6	1	3	5	2	6	6	
Contestants	Netherlands	171	129	42					3	6	3		4	4	10		2						5											1			1				1			2
Contestants	Ukraine	631	192	439	12	12	8	8		10	12	12	12	12	12	12	12	12	10	12	12	7	12	12	12	12	10	12	12	10	10	10	12	10	12	10	12	12	12	12	12	12	12	12
Contestants	Germany	6	0	6							2																2											2						
Contestants	Lithuania	128	35	93			1		10		7		1			10		2		4		3	2	2	10			7		2			8	2	5	3			2	7	3	2		
Contestants	Azerbaijan	106	103	3																															3									
Contestants	Belgium	64	59	5	4															1																								
Contestants	Greece	215	158	57		7				12		3				7					6			10						3				8	1									
Contestants	Iceland	20	10	10					8																			2																
Contestants	Moldova	253	14	239	10	4	7		6	1	6		8	10	8	4	6	7	3		7	12	6		7	7	4	5	10	5	7	12	7	7	8	8	5	7	5	8		4	8	10
Contestants	Sweden	438	258	180	2	3	4	5			10	4	7	5	5	8	5	10	4	5		1	8		6	6	3	10		7	1	6	3	5		4	10	6	8	4		5	5	5
Contestants	Australia	125	123	2								2																																
Contestants	United Kingdom	466	283	183	8	6		12	7	4	5	8	6	6	3	6	10	3	5	3	3		7	6	3	8	5	6	2	1		3	6		4		4	8	4		6	7	2	6
Contestants	Poland	151	46	105	6			2	12			1		8	7	5	1						4	3		1	1	4	4		4		10					4		10	5	3	7	3
Contestants	Serbia	312	87	225	3	8	12	6		3		6	5	7	2	3	7	5	8		10		1	7	2	2	12		8	6	12	7	1	12	7	12		10	7	1	8	8	10	7
Contestants	Estonia	141	43	98	1		3		5	5						2		8		7		6			8			3		12	3	5				2	8		10	2	4		4	

==== 12 points ====
Below is a summary of all 12 points received in the final. In the jury vote, Spain and the United Kingdom each received the maximum score of 12 points from eight countries, with Greece receiving six sets of 12 points. Sweden and Ukraine received the maximum score from five countries, while Azerbaijan received three sets of 12 points. Italy and Serbia were awarded two sets of 12 points each, and the Netherlands was awarded one set of 12 points.

In the public vote, Ukraine received the maximum score of 12 points from a record-breaking twenty-eight countries. Serbia received the maximum score from five countries, Moldova were awarded two sets of 12 points, and Estonia, Greece, Poland, Spain, and the United Kingdom were each awarded one set of 12 points.

12 points awarded by juries
N.	Contestant	Nation(s) giving 12 points
8	Spain	Armenia, Australia, Ireland, Malta, North Macedonia, Portugal, San Marino, Sweden
8	United Kingdom	Austria, Azerbaijan, Belgium, Czech Republic, France, Georgia, Germany, Ukraine
6	Greece	Bulgaria, Cyprus, Denmark, Netherlands, Norway, Switzerland
5	Sweden	Estonia, Finland, Iceland, Israel, United Kingdom
5	Ukraine	Latvia, Lithuania, Moldova, Poland, Romania
3	Azerbaijan	Greece, Serbia, Spain
2	Italy	Albania, Slovenia
2	Serbia	Croatia, Montenegro
1	Netherlands	Italy

12 points awarded by televoting
N.	Contestant	Nation(s) giving 12 points
28	Ukraine	Australia, Austria, Azerbaijan, Belgium, Bulgaria, Cyprus, Czech Republic, Denmark, Estonia, Finland, France, Georgia, Germany, Iceland, Ireland, Israel, Italy, Latvia, Lithuania, Moldova, Netherlands, Norway, Poland, Portugal, San Marino, Spain, Sweden, United Kingdom
5	Serbia	Croatia, Montenegro, North Macedonia, Slovenia, Switzerland
2	Moldova	Romania, Serbia
1	Estonia	Armenia
1	Greece	Albania
1	Poland	Ukraine
1	Spain	Greece
1	United Kingdom	Malta

== Broadcasts ==
All participating broadcasters may choose to have on-site or remote commentators providing an insight about the show and voting information to their local audience. While they must broadcast at least the semi-final they are voting in and the final, most broadcasters air all three shows with different programming plans. Similarly, some non-participating broadcasters may still want to air the contest.

The European Broadcasting Union provided international live streams of both semi-finals and the final through their official YouTube channel with no commentary, and through their official TikTok channel with an additional backstage feed. The YouTube live streams were geo-blocked to viewers in the Czech Republic, Greece, United Kingdom and the United States. After the live broadcasts, all three shows were made available for every country listed above except the United States.

For the first time in the contest's history, RAI trialled the broadcasts of the event in 4K UHD. The contest was aired on Rai 4K as an upscaled version of the HD feed, as RAI had yet to be fully equipped for broadcast of native 4K content.

Broadcasters and commentators in participating countries
Country	Broadcaster	Channel(s)	Show(s)	Commentator(s)	Ref(s)
Albania	RTSH	RTSH 1, RTSH Muzikë, Radio Tirana	All shows	Andri Xhahu	
Armenia	AMPTV	Armenia 1	All shows	Garik Papoyan and Hrachuhi Utmazyan	
Armenia	Public Radio	Unknown	All shows	Garik Papoyan and Hrachuhi Utmazyan	
Australia	SBS	SBS	All shows	Myf Warhurst and Joel Creasey	
Austria	ORF	ORF 1	All shows	Andi Knoll	
Austria	ORF	FM4	Final	Kurdwin Ayub, Florian Alexander, Hannes Duscher and Roland Gratzer	
Azerbaijan	İTV		All shows	Murad Arif	
Belgium	RTBF	La Une, VivaCité	All shows	Jean-Louis Lahaye and Maureen Louys	
Belgium	VRT	één	All shows	Peter Van de Veire	
Bulgaria	BNT	BNT 1, BNT 4	All shows	Elena Rosberg and Petko Kralev	
Croatia	HRT	HRT 1	All shows	Duško Ćurlić	
Croatia	HRT	HR 2	All shows	Zlatko Turkalj	
Cyprus	CyBC	RIK 1, RIK HD, RIK Sat	All shows	Melina Karageorgiou and Alexandros Taramountas	
Czech Republic	ČT	ČT2	All shows	Jan Maxián	
Denmark	DR	DR1	All shows	Henrik Milling and Nicolai Molbech	
Estonia	ERR	ETV	All shows	Marko Reikop	
Estonia	ERR	ETV+	All shows	Aleksandr Hobotov and Julia Kalenda	
Finland	Yle	Yle TV1, Yle Areena	All shows	Finnish: Mikko Silvennoinen; Swedish: Eva Frantz and Johan Lindroos; Russian: Levan Tvaltvadze; Inari Sami: Heli Huovinen; Northern Sami: Aslak Paltto	
Finland	Yle	Yle Radio Suomi	All shows	Sanna Pirkkalainen and Toni Laaksonen	
Finland	Yle	Yle X3M	All shows	Eva Frantz and Johan Lindroos	
France	France Télévisions	Culturebox	Semi-finals	Laurence Boccolini	
France	France Télévisions	France 2	Final	Stéphane Bern and Laurence Boccolini	
France	France Télévisions	Polynésie La Première	Final	Stéphane Bern and Laurence Boccolini	
France	France Télévisions	Saint-Pierre and Miquelon La Première (Note: Delayed broadcast of the Final in Saint Pierre and Miquelon on 15 May at 22:55 UTC−02:00)	Final	Stéphane Bern and Laurence Boccolini	
France	France Télévisions	France 3 Bretagne	Final	Goulwena an Henaff, Yann-Herle, Thelo Mell and Mael Gwenneg	
Georgia	GPB	1TV	All shows	Nika Lobiladze	
Germany	ARD/NDR	One	All shows	Peter Urban	
Germany	ARD/NDR	Das Erste	Final	Peter Urban	
Germany	ARD/NDR	Deutsche Welle	Final	Peter Urban	
Germany	ARD/NDR	Radio Eins	Final	Amelie Ernst and Max Spallek	
Greece	ERT	ERT1	All shows	Maria Kozakou and Giorgos Kapoutzidis	
Greece	ERT	Deftero Programma, Voice of Greece	All shows	Dimitris Meidanis	
Iceland	RÚV	RÚV, RÚV 2	All shows	Gísli Marteinn Baldursson	
Iceland	RÚV	Rás 2	Final	Gísli Marteinn Baldursson	
Ireland	RTÉ	RTÉ2	Semi-finals	Marty Whelan	
Ireland	RTÉ	RTÉ One	Final	Marty Whelan	
Ireland	RTÉ	RTÉ Radio 1	SF2/Final	Neil Doherty and Zbyszek Zalinski	
Israel	IPBC	Kan 11, Kan Tarbut	All shows	Asaf Liberman and Akiva Novick	
Italy	RAI	Rai 1, Rai 4K, Rai Italia	All shows	Gabriele Corsi, Cristiano Malgioglio and Carolina Di Domenico	
Italy	RAI	Rai Radio 2	All shows	Ema Stokholma, Gino Castaldo and Saverio Raimondo	
Italy	RAI	RaiPlay	All shows	The Jackal	
Latvia	LTV	LTV1	All shows	Toms Grēviņš and Lauris Reiniks	
Lithuania	LRT	LRT televizija, LRT Radijas	All shows	Ramūnas Zilnys	
Malta	PBS	TVM	All shows	No commentary	
Moldova	TRM	Moldova 1, Radio Moldova	All shows	Ion Jalbă and Daniela Crudu	
Montenegro	RTCG	TVCG 1, TVCG SAT	All shows	Dražen Bauković	
Netherlands	AVROTROS	NPO 1, BVN	All shows	Cornald Maas and Jan Smit	
Netherlands	AVROTROS	NPO Radio 2	Final	Frank van 't Hof and Jeroen Kijk in de Vegte	
North Macedonia	MRT	MRT 1, MRT 2	All shows	Eli Tanaskovska	
Norway	NRK	NRK1	All shows	Marte Stokstad	
Norway	NRK	NRK P1	Final	Jon Marius Hyttebakk and Marit Sofie Strand	
Poland	TVP	TVP1, TVP Polonia	All shows	Aleksander Sikora and Marek Sierocki	
Portugal	RTP	RTP1, RTP Internacional, RTP África	All shows (Note: The second semi-final was broadcast on a 1.5-hour delay, starting at 21:30 WEST.)	Nuno Galopim	
Romania	TVR	TVR 1, TVRi	SF1	Bogdan Stănescu	
Romania	TVR	TVR 1, TVRi	SF2/Final	Bogdan Stănescu and Kyrie Mendél	
San Marino	SMRTV	San Marino RTV, Radio San Marino	All shows	Lia Fiorio and Gigi Restivo	
Serbia	RTS	RTS 1, RTS Planeta, RTS Svet	SF1	Silvana Grujić	
Serbia	RTS	RTS 1, RTS Planeta, RTS Svet	SF2/Final	Duška Vučinić	
Slovenia	RTVSLO	TV SLO 2	Semi-finals	Andrej Hofer	
Slovenia	RTVSLO	TV SLO 1	Final	Andrej Hofer	
Slovenia	RTVSLO	Radio Val 202, Radio Maribor	SF1/Final	Maruša Kerec	
Spain	RTVE	La 1, TVE Internacional	All shows	Tony Aguilar and Julia Varela	
Spain	RTVE	Radio Nacional	Final	Imanol Durán, Sara Calvo and David Asensio	
Sweden	SVT	SVT1	Semi-finals	Edward af Sillén	
Sweden	SVT	SVT1	Final	Edward af Sillén and Linnea Henriksson	
Sweden	SVT	SVT24	All shows	Audio description: Annika Lundin	
Sweden	SR	SR P4	All shows	Carolina Norén	
Switzerland	SRG SSR	SRF zwei	Semi-finals	Sven Epiney	
Switzerland	SRG SSR	SRF info	SF2	Sven Epiney	
Switzerland	SRG SSR	SRF 1	Final	Sven Epiney	
Switzerland	SRG SSR	RTS 2	Semi-finals	Jean-Marc Richard and Nicolas Tanner	
Switzerland	SRG SSR	RTS 1	Final	Jean-Marc Richard and Gjon's Tears	
Switzerland	SRG SSR	RSI La 2	SF1	Clarissa Tami and Francesca Margiotta	
Switzerland	SRG SSR	RSI La 2	SF2	Clarissa Tami and Boris Piffaretti	
Switzerland	SRG SSR	RSI La 1	Final	Clarissa Tami, Francesca Margiotta and Boris Piffaretti	
Ukraine	UA:PBC	UA:Kultura	All shows	Timur Miroshnychenko	
Ukraine	UA:PBC	UA:Radio Promin	Semi-finals (Note: The semi-finals on Radio Promin featured TV commentary by Miroshnychenko while radio presenters Oleksandra Franko and Yevhen Pavliukovskyi provided studio discussions during TV commercial breaks.)	Timur Miroshnychenko	
Ukraine	UA:PBC	UA:Radio Promin	Final	Anna Zakletska and Dmytro Zakharchenko	
United Kingdom	BBC	BBC Three	Semi-finals	Scott Mills and Rylan Clark	
United Kingdom	BBC	BBC One	Final	Graham Norton	
United Kingdom	BBC	BBC Radio 2	Final	Ken Bruce	

Broadcasters and commentators in non-participating countries
Country/Territory	Broadcaster	Channel(s)	Show(s)	Commentator(s)	Ref(s)
Kosovo	RTK	Unknown	All shows	Unknown	
United States	NBC	Peacock	All shows	Johnny Weir	
United States	WJFD-FM		Final	Ewan Spence and Alesia Michelle	

== Incidents and controversies ==
=== Impact of the Russian invasion of Ukraine ===
==== Ukrainian entry replacement ====
Following the controversy surrounding the Ukrainian national final in 2019, which led to the country withdrawing from the contest that year, a new rule was introduced starting from 2020 which bans artists who have performed in Russia since 2014 or have entered Crimea "in violation of the legislation of Ukraine" from entering. The 2022 Ukrainian national final was won by Alina Pash with the song "Shadows of Forgotten Ancestors". On 14 February 2022, two days after the national final, activist and video blogger Serhii Sternenko alleged that Pash had entered Crimea from Russian territory in 2015, and counterfeited her travel documentation with her team in order to take part in the competition. The Ukrainian broadcaster UA:PBC subsequently stated that it would request the Ukrainian State Border Guard Service to verify if the documentation is forged, and that Pash would not be the Ukrainian representative "until the verification and clarification of the facts is completed". After it was discovered that a representative of Pash's team had handed in falsified documentation to UA:PBC, on 16 February, Pash announced her withdrawal as the Ukrainian representative in the contest. Runner-up of the national final, Kalush Orchestra with the song "Stefania", were given an offer to represent Ukraine in Pash's place on 17 February. On 22 February, UA:PBC confirmed that Kalush Orchestra had accepted the offer.

==== Exclusion of Russia ====
In the wake of the Russian invasion of Ukraine, which began on 24 February 2022, UA:PBC appealed to suspend Russian EBU member broadcasters VGTRK and Channel One from the union, and to exclude Russia from competing in the contest. The appeal alleged that since the beginning of the Russian military intervention in Ukraine in 2014, VGTRK and Channel One have been a mouthpiece for the Russian government and a key tool of political propaganda financed from the Russian state budget. The EBU initially stated that Russia as well as Ukraine would still be allowed to participate in the contest, citing the non-political nature of the event.

Several broadcasters expressed their concern at the decision and issued statements calling for the removal of Russia from the contest. In addition to Ukraine's UA:PBC, nine other countries' broadcasters requested the EBU to change the decision: Denmark's DR, Estonia's ERR, Finland's Yle, Iceland's RÚV, Lithuania's LRT, the Netherlands' AVROTROS, Norway's NRK, Poland's TVP and Sweden's SVT. Yle also stated that they would withdraw their participation if Russia were not excluded from the contest. This was followed by a similar announcement from ERR. Latvian representatives Citi Zēni also urged the EBU to reconsider Russian participation. On 25 February 2022, the EBU announced that Russia would not compete at the contest, stating that "in light of the unprecedented crisis in Ukraine, the inclusion of a Russian entry in this year's Contest would bring the competition into disrepute." The following day, all EBU members from Russia, including VGTRK and Channel One, announced their withdrawal from the union, according to a statement released by Russian state media. Russia had not publicly announced an artist or song before being excluded.

==== Ukrainian preparations ====
Following the start of the invasion, UA:PBC and Kalush Orchestra had yet to formally comment on whether their participation in the contest would continue. On 14 March 2022, Claudio Fasulo and Simona Martorelli, executive producers of the 2022 contest, confirmed that Ukraine would still be competing; this was later reaffirmed by UA:PBC on 19 March via a post on its social media pages. They added that work would commence on the Ukrainian 'live-on-tape' backup performance, which was planned to be recorded in Lviv and used in the event that the delegation cannot travel to Turin, however, the delegation was later exempted from the requirement to do so. On 2 April, UA:PBC confirmed that Kalush Orchestra and the rest of the delegation was given permission to travel to Turin for the contest, adding that the group would also take part in promotional events across Europe to raise donations for war relief efforts.

==== Attempted cyber attacks ====
On 11 May 2022, pro-Russia hacker group Killnet carried out an attack on numerous Italian institutional websites, including those of the Ministry of Defense, the Senate, the National Health Institute and the Automobile Club d'Italia. The official website of the Eurovision Song Contest was later revealed to be among those that were targeted, in addition to the platform on which the contest's voting system is based. Additional attacks were reported to have taken place during the first semi-final and the final. The attacks were ultimately unsuccessful, and there were no disruptions to either the website or the voting platform.

==== On-stage statements ====
During the broadcast of the final, after Kalush Orchestra had finished their performance, the group's frontman Oleh Psiuk shouted onstage: "I ask all of you, please help Ukraine, Mariupol. Help Azovstal, right now!" The contest's rules precludes promoting political statements and messages, and several commentators noted that Psiuk's statement could be in breach of the rules. However, the EBU deemed the statement to be "humanitarian rather than political in nature”. The German and Icelandic representatives, Malik Harris and Systur respectively, also showed support for Ukraine onstage after finishing their performances.

=== Rehearsal stage malfunction ===
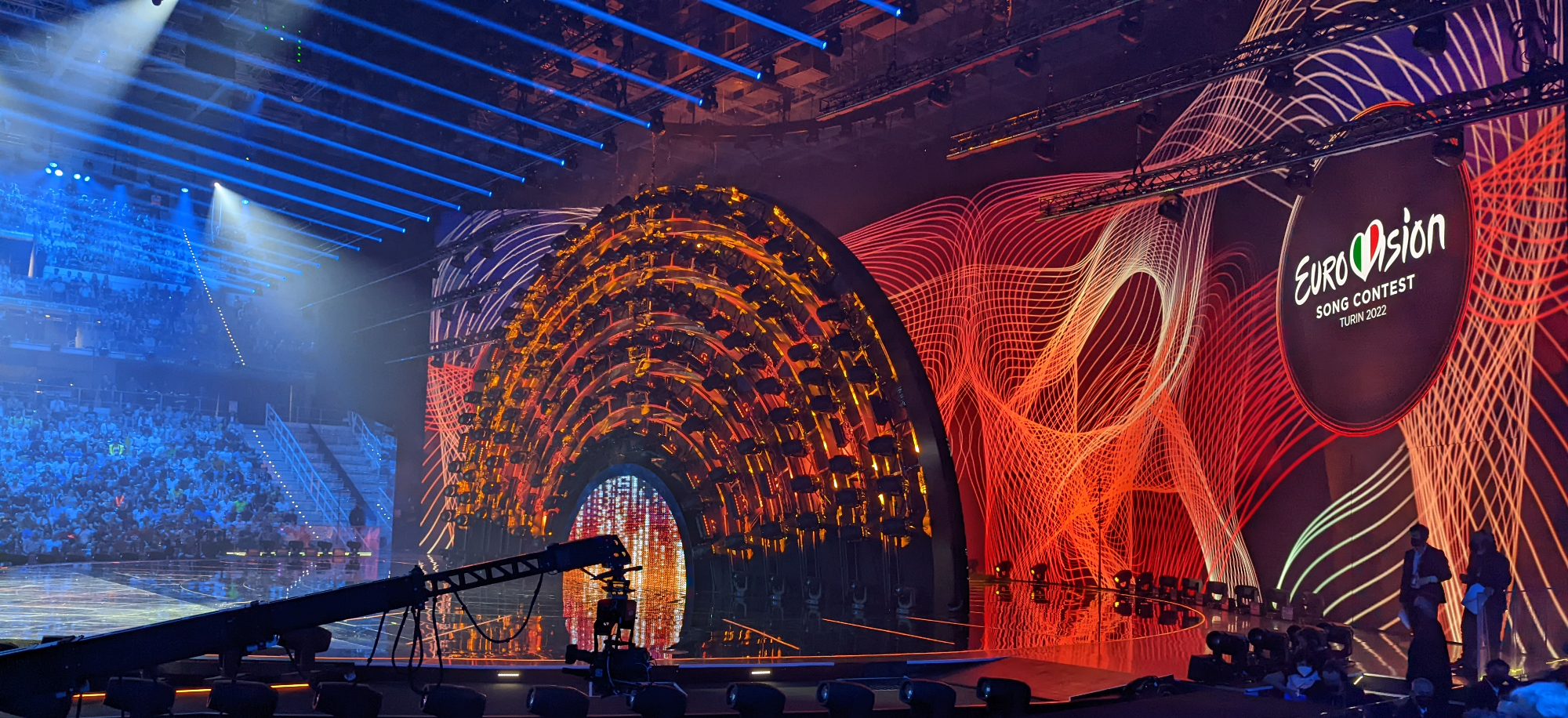
The 'kinetic sun' component of the stage in its static form.

During the first day of rehearsals in Turin on 30 April 2022, Italian newspapers La Repubblica and La Stampa reported technical difficulties with the 'kinetic sun' component of the stage, with its arches not being able to move as freely as expected. The papers also reported that the malfunction could not be completely fixed in time for the live shows. Several delegations, among them those from Belgium, Denmark, Estonia, Finland and Lithuania, were forced to revise their staging plans, having been informed of the malfunction a few days prior. La Stampa later reported the following day that a compromise was reached, in which the arches would stay static for the competing entries' performances, while for the opening and interval acts, the arches would be permitted to move dynamically. This was later confirmed by the EBU in a statement issued to Danish broadcaster DR on 2 May.

=== Macedonian flag incident ===
During the "Turquoise Carpet" event on 8 May 2022, the Macedonian representative Andrea was seen lightly tossing the Macedonian flag on the ground before posing for the press. The Macedonian broadcaster MRT later published a statement condemning her action, describing it as "desecration of a national symbol, which is punishable by Macedonian law". In the same statement, the broadcaster stated that it was considering withdrawing Andrea from the contest, and that people in the delegation that are deemed responsible for the incident would be sanctioned. Andrea herself issued an apology later that day. MRT later stated on 11 May that it would take all disciplinary measures after the delegation returned from Turin, while also raising the possibility that it would not return for the 2023 contest, because of the negative publicity caused by the incident. MRT eventually confirmed its non-participation in the 2023 contest, citing financial difficulties, instead.

=== Jury vote irregularities ===
In a statement released during the broadcast of the final, the EBU revealed that during the jury show of the second semi-final on 11 May 2022, six national juries, namely those of Azerbaijan, Georgia, Montenegro, Poland, Romania and San Marino, were found to have had irregular voting patterns. As a result, these six countries were given substitute aggregated jury results for the second semi-final and the final based on countries with similar voting patterns, as determined by the pots that the countries were put into for the semi-final allocation draw in January. The Flemish broadcaster VRT later reported that the juries of the countries involved had made agreements to vote for each other.

During the announcement of the jury votes in the final, Azerbaijan, Romania and Georgia had their votes announced by Martin Österdahl, the contest's executive supervisor. This was stated to have been due to technical difficulties in establishing connection with those countries' designated spokespersons. The spokespersons who would have announced them were Narmin Salmanova, Eda Marcus and Helen Kalandadze respectively. A press release from the Romanian broadcaster TVR on 20 May revealed that the reason for Österdahl's intervention on behalf of the Romanian spokesperson was due to TVR's refusal to accept the aggregate scores calculated by the EBU.

The day after the final, TVR accused the EBU of "changing the rules" and requested further clarification of the incident. In their original decision, the Romanian jury awarded 12 points to Moldova. The Georgian broadcaster GPB and the Azerbaijani broadcaster İTV also requested a more detailed statement on the jury vote issues, disclosing that their juries' 12 points were originally awarded to Ukraine. The Montenegrin broadcaster RTCG and the Polish broadcaster TVP also requested more clarification on the issue. In addition, TVR and İTV claimed that no technical difficulties had occurred during the jury voting segment of the final.

On 19 May 2022, the EBU released the full breakdown of the nullified jury votes from the second semi-final. RTCG, TVR and the Sammarinese broadcaster SMRTV denied any wrongdoing on their part, with the former two claiming that other irregular voting patterns existed but were not detected. TVR also threatened to withdraw from the contest for 2023 and future editions, while also planning to take legal action against the EBU in response. However, it was reported by Romanian news outlet Impact.ro on 29 July that TVR had dropped all of its objections, and on 26 August, TVR confirmed its participation in the 2023 contest. RTCG did not participate in 2023 due to financial constraints, while the broadcasters from the remaining four countries involved continued to compete.

== Reception ==
Following the 2022 contest, three entries entered the Billboard Global 200 chart dated 28 May 2022: Ukraine's winning entry "Stefania" at number 85, the United Kingdom's "Space Man" at number 93, and Spain's "SloMo" at number 151. On the Billboard Global Excl. US chart also dated 28 May 2022, the three aforementioned entries entered at numbers 39, 37 and 79, respectively, followed by Italy's "Brividi" at number 194. "Brividi" had previously peaked at number seven on the Global Excl. US chart and at number 15 on the Global 200 chart following its win at the Sanremo Music Festival 2022, which also doubled as the Italian national final.

By the end of June 2022, Armenia's entry "Snap" had begun to gain traction on video sharing service TikTok, and subsequently gained viral success on the platform; it had featured in almost 360,000 clips on the service by July of that year. As a result, the song experienced a surge in streams and downloads, and went on to chart in multiple countries. It topped the charts in the Flanders region of Belgium, reached the top ten in ten countries, and charted in a further 23 countries, including peaking at number 21 on the UK Singles Chart and at number 67 on the US Billboard Hot 100. The latter achievement also made "Snap" the second Eurovision song of the 21st century to enter the Billboard Hot 100, after the 2019 winning entry "Arcade".

== Other awards ==
In addition to the main winner's trophy, the Marcel Bezençon Awards and the You're a Vision Award were contested during the Eurovision Song Contest 2022. The OGAE, "General Organisation of Eurovision Fans" voting poll also took place before the contest.

=== Marcel Bezençon Awards ===
The Marcel Bezençon Awards, organised since 2002 by Sweden's then-Head of Delegation and 1992 representative Christer Björkman, and winner of the 1984 contest Richard Herrey, honours songs in the contest's final. The awards are divided into three categories: the Artistic Award, the Composers Award, and the Press Award. The winners were revealed shortly before the Eurovision final on 14 May.

Category	Country	Song	Artist	Songwriter(s)
Artistic Award	Serbia	"In corpore sano"	Konstrakta	Ana Đurić; Milovan Bošković
Composers Award	Sweden	"Hold Me Closer"	Cornelia Jakobs	Cornelia Jakobsdotter; Isa Molin; David Zandén
Press Award	United Kingdom	"Space Man"	Sam Ryder	Sam Ryder; Amy Wadge; Max Wolfgang

=== OGAE ===
OGAE, an organisation of over forty Eurovision Song Contest fan clubs across Europe and beyond, conducts an annual voting poll first held in 2002 as the Marcel Bezençon Fan Award. After all votes were cast, the top-ranked entry in the 2022 poll was Sweden's "Hold Me Closer" performed by Cornelia Jakobs; the top five results are shown below.

Country	Song	Artist	Points
Sweden	"Hold Me Closer"	Cornelia Jakobs	393
Italy	"Brividi"	Mahmood and Blanco	387
Spain	"SloMo"	Chanel	294
Netherlands	"De diepte"	S10	218
United Kingdom	"Space Man"	Sam Ryder	204

=== You're a Vision Award ===
2022 saw the first edition of the You're a Vision Award (a word play of "Eurovision"), ran by the fansite Songfestival.be. Following the cancellation of the Barbara Dex Award due to its associated negative connotations, the You're a Vision Award was established with the aim to "celebrate the creativity and diversity that embody the Eurovision spirit", with the winner being the one with the most notable outfit. Australia's Sheldon Riley won the award, with Spain's Chanel, Norway's Subwoolfer, and San Marino's Achille Lauro completing the top four.

Place	Country	Artist
1	Australia	Sheldon Riley
2	Spain	Chanel
3	Norway	Subwoolfer
4	San Marino	Achille Lauro

== Official album ==
Cover art of the official album

Eurovision Song Contest: Turin 2022 is the official compilation album of the contest, put together by the European Broadcasting Union and released by Universal Music Group digitally on 8 April 2022, in CD format on 22 April 2022, and in cassette and vinyl formats on 6 May 2022. The album features all 40 entries including the semi-finalists that failed to qualify for the final.

=== Charts ===
==== Weekly charts ====
Weekly chart performance for Eurovision Song Contest: Turin 2022
Chart (2022)	Peak position
Australian Albums (ARIA)	11
Austrian Compilation Albums (Ö3 Austria)	1
German Compilation Albums (Offizielle Top 100)	1
Dutch Compilation Albums (Compilation Top 30)	1
Irish Compilation Albums (IRMA)	4
Italian Albums (FIMI)	47
Lithuanian Albums (AGATA)	93
Polish Albums (ZPAV)	47
Swiss Albums (Schweizer Hitparade)	1
UK Compilation Albums (Official Charts)	1
US Top Compilation Albums (Billboard)	5

==== Year-end charts ====
Year-end chart performance for Eurovision Song Contest: Turin 2022
Chart (2022)	Position
Swiss Compilation Albums (Schweizer Hitparade)	7

=== Certifications ===
Certifications for Eurovision Song Contest: Turin 2022
Region	Certification	Certified units/sales
United Kingdom (BPI)	Silver	60,000^{‡}
^{‡} Sales+streaming figures based on certification alone.

== See also ==
- American Song Contest
- Eurovision Young Musicians 2022
- Junior Eurovision Song Contest 2022
