= 1997 Summer Universiade =

Multi-sport event in Sicily, Italy

XIX Summer Universiade XIX Universiade estiva
- Host city: Sicily, Italy
- Nations: 124
- Athletes: 3,496
- Events: 127 in 10 sports
- Opening: 19 August 1997
- Closing: 31 August 1997
- Opened by: Oscar Luigi Scalfaro; President of Italy
- Torch lighter: Anarita Sidotti
- Main venue: Stadio La Favorita/Stadio Angelo Massimino
- Website: ulb.ac.be (archived)

The 1997 Summer Universiade, also known as the XIX Summer Universiade, took place in the island of Sicily, Italy. The United States topped the medal table.

== Venues ==
=== Catania ===
- Stadio Angelo Massimino — opening ceremonies, athletics and football
- Teatro Massimo Bellini — fencing
- PalaCatania — volleyball and Rhythmic gymnastics

=== Acireale ===
- PalaTupparello — volleyball

=== Messina ===
- PalaSanFilippo — basketball (finals)

=== University of Messina ===
- Polo dell'Annuziata- swimming
- Polo del Centro - diving
- Polo del Papardo — water polo
- Complesso Sportivo Cappuccini — water polo (finals)

=== Trapani ===
- PalaTrapani — basketball
- Stadio Polisportivo Provinciale - football

=== Marsala, Sicily ===
- Stadio Antonino Lombardo Angota -football

=== Ragusa ===
- PalaMinardi — basketball

=== Favara ===
- Palasport A. Giglia — basketball

=== Capo d'Orlando ===
- PalaFantozzi — basketball

=== Siracusa ===
- Greek theatre of Syracuse - Artistic gymnastics

=== Palermo ===
- Stadio Renzo Barbera — football, closing ceremonies
- Palasport dell'Università di Palermo — volleyball
- Velodromo Borsellino— tennis

=== Sciacca ===
- Stadio Luigi Riccardo Gurrera - football

=== Caltanissetta ===
- Stadio Marco Tomaselli - football

== Sports ==
- Athletics ()
- Basketball ()
- Diving ()
- Fencing ()
- Football ()
- Gymnastics ()
- Swimming ()
- Tennis ()
- Volleyball ()
- Water polo ()

== Medal table ==
* Host nation (Italy)

Rank	Nation	Gold	Silver	Bronze	Total
1	United States	20	19	22	61
2	Ukraine	17	6	4	27
3	Japan	14	8	11	33
4	Russia	10	14	10	34
5	China	10	9	7	26
6	Italy*	7	14	10	31
7	Cuba	7	11	4	22
8	Hungary	7	4	1	12
9	South Korea	5	3	2	10
10	Slovakia	4	0	2	6
11	Romania	3	4	6	13
12	Belarus	3	2	3	8
13	Brazil	3	2	1	6
14	France	2	4	6	12
15	Australia	2	3	5	10
16	South Africa	2	2	2	6
17	Germany	2	1	8	11
18	Great Britain	2	1	3	6
19	Chinese Taipei (TPE)	2	1	1	4
20	Nigeria	2	0	0	2
21	Czech Republic	1	4	4	9
22	Mexico	1	2	1	4
22	Netherlands	1	2	1	4
24	Poland	1	1	5	7
25	Greece	1	0	0	1
26	Canada	0	4	4	8
27	Jamaica	0	2	1	3
28	Kenya	0	1	1	2
28	Portugal	0	1	1	2
30	Belgium	0	1	0	1
30	Israel	0	1	0	1
30	Spain	0	1	0	1
33	Austria	0	0	3	3
34	Slovenia	0	0	2	2
35	Bulgaria	0	0	1	1
35	Croatia	0	0	1	1
35	Cyprus	0	0	1	1
35	Qatar	0	0	1	1
Totals (38 entries)		129	128	135	392
