= Intention (Intelligent Music Project song) =

2021 single by Intelligent Music Project

Single by Intelligent Music Project
- Language: English
- Released: 5 December 2021
- Length: 2:58
- Songwriter: Milen Vrabevski

Music video
- "Intention" on YouTube

Eurovision Song Contest 2022 entry
- Country: Bulgaria
- Artist: Intelligent Music Project
- Language: English
- Lyricist: Milen Vrabevski

Finals performance
- Semi-final result: 16th
- Semi-final points: 29

Entry chronology
- ◄ "Growing Up Is Getting Old" (2021)
- "Bangaranga" (2026) ►

Official performance video
- "Intention" (first semi-final) on YouTube

"Intention" is a song by Bulgarian progressive rock supergroup Intelligent Music Project. The song represented Bulgaria in the Eurovision Song Contest 2022 after being internally selected by BNT, Bulgaria's broadcaster for the Eurovision Song Contest.

== Background ==
According to the band, the song is about confronting the challenges of life. The first verse talks about a troubled youth with trauma. However, during the pre-chorus, the person eventually comes to terms with their past, eventually having a feeling of strength of having overcome much adversity during the chorus. In the second verse, the song's lyrics become more positive, and the message of the power of intentions is carried through the verse. The song ends with the message that to escape the demons of the past, it is important to look towards the future.

== Eurovision Song Contest ==
=== Selection ===
In mid-September 2021, Intelligent Music Project founder Milen Vrabevski revealed to Radio Plovdiv that they had been selected to represent Bulgaria at the Eurovision Song Contest 2022. No official confirmation came until 25 November, when BNT announced the group as their representative for 2022 with the song "Intention".

=== At Eurovision ===
According to Eurovision rules, all nations with the exceptions of the host country and the "Big Five" (France, Germany, Italy, Spain and the United Kingdom) are required to qualify from one of two semi-finals in order to compete for the final; the top ten countries from each semi-final progress to the final. The European Broadcasting Union (EBU) split up the competing countries into six different pots based on voting patterns from previous contests, with countries with favourable voting histories put into the same pot. On 25 January 2022, an allocation draw was held which placed each country into one of the two semi-finals, as well as which half of the show they would perform in. Bulgaria was placed into the first semi-final, held on 10 May 2022, and performed in the first half of the show.
