= Carolina Di Domenico =

Italian television presenter

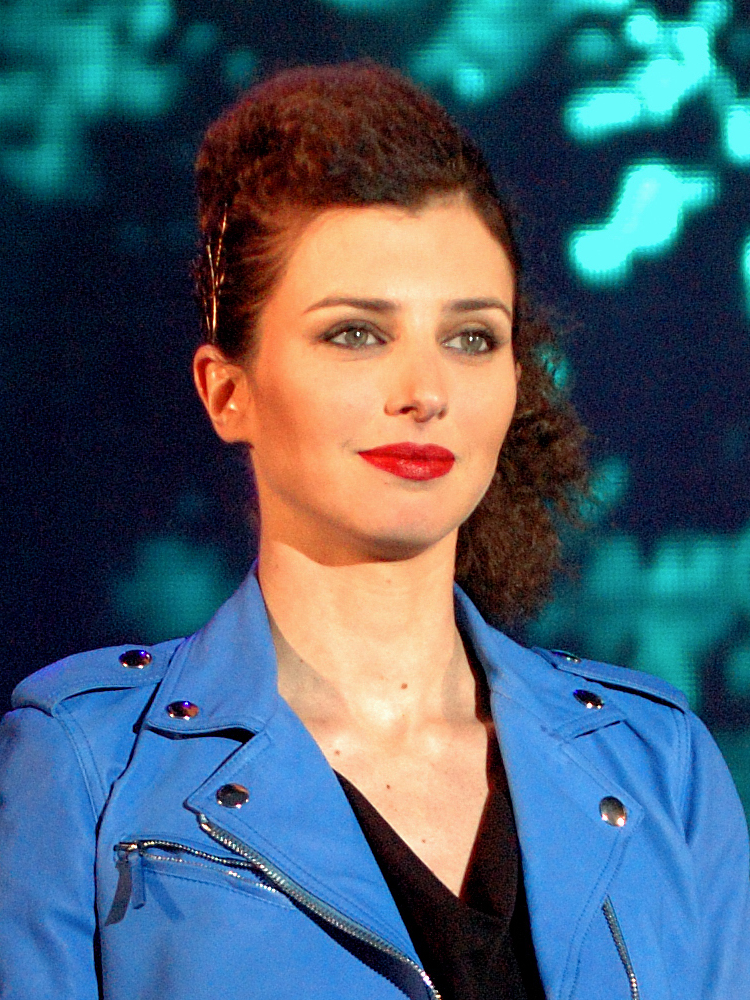
- Domenico in 2010
- Born: 5 April 1979 (age 46); Naples, Italy
- Occupations: Television presenter, radio presenter
- Years active: 1998–present

Carolina Di Domenico (born 5 April 1979 in Naples) is an Italian television and radio presenter. She started her career by presenting the Italian version of Disney Club on Rai 1. She has then worked for MTV Italia. She announced the Italian jury results in the final of the Eurovision Song Contest 2021 and 2022. She co-hosted the allocation draw, the opening ceremony and the press conferences for the 2022 Eurovision contest as well.

== Biography ==
Born in Naples in 1979, she studied at the linguistic high school, where she graduated in 1998. She then enrolled in the faculty of Sociology, majoring in mass communication, at the Sapienza University of Rome. She has lived in Rome since 2003.

== Television ==
- Disney Club (Rai 1, 1999–2000; Rai 2, 2000–2003)
- MTV day (MTV, 2003)
- Dancefloor chart (MTV, 2003)
- TRL (MTV, 2004–2005)
- EMA (MTV, 2004)
- A night with (MTV, 2005–2008)
- Hitlist Italia (MTV, 2006–2008)
