= Intelligent Music Project =

Bulgarian supergroup

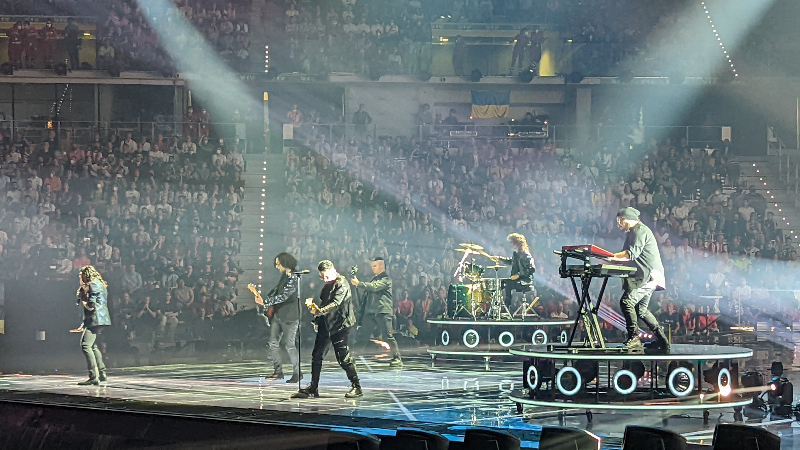
- Intelligent Music Project at the Eurovision Song Contest 2022

Background information
- Origin: Bulgaria
- Genres: Progressive rock
- Years active: 2012-present
- Label: Intelligent Music
- Members: Slavin Slavchev; Bisser Ivanov; Ivo Stefanov; Dimitar Sirakov; Stoyan Yankoulov-Stundzhi; Borislav Mudolov-Kosatkata; Krassimira Ivanova; Samuel Eftimov
- Website: intelligent-music.com

Intelligent Music Project is a Bulgarian supergroup founded in 2012 by Bulgarian businessman Milen Vrabevski. They represented Bulgaria at the Eurovision Song Contest 2022 with their song "Intention", but failed to qualify beyond the semi-final on 10 May.

== History ==
The supergroup was founded by businessman Milen Vrabevski and has featured a string of renowned musicians, including Simon Phillips, John Payne, Carl Sentance, Bobby Rondinelli and Todd Sucherman. Intelligent Music Project released their debut album in 2012 and have since then being releasing music and touring. Their current lead singer is the Bulgarian X-factor winner Slavin Slavchev.

In November 2021 BNT revealed that Intelligent Music Project were selected to represent the nation at the Eurovision Song Contest 2022 in Turin. Their entry, "Intention", was released on December 5, becoming the first to be published that season. At the time the group consisted of Ronnie Romero, Bisser Ivanov, Slavin Slavchev, Ivo Stefanov, Dimitar Sirakov and Stoyan Yankoulov. Yankoulov had already represented Bulgaria at the Eurovision Song Contest in 2007 and 2013, as part of the Elitsa and Stoyan duo.

== Band members ==
Current members

- Slavin Slavchev – lead vocals
- Borislav Mudolov-Kosatkata – backing vocals
- Stoyan Yankoulov-Stundzhi – drums
- Bisser Ivanov – guitars
- Dimitar Sirakov – bass
- Ivo Stefanov – keyboards
- Samuel Eftimov – keyboards

Other members of the project

- Simon Phillips
- John Lawton
- Joseph Williams
- Ronnie Romero
- John Payne
- Carl Sentance
- Bobby Rondinelli
- Todd Sucherman
- Nathan East
- Tim Pierce
- Richard Grisman

== Discography ==
=== Studio Albums ===
- 2012 – The Power of Mind
- 2014 – My Kind o' Lovin'
- 2015 – Touching the Divine
- 2018 – Sorcery Inside
- 2020 – Life Motion
- 2021 – The Creation
- 2022 – Unconditioned
- 2024 – Miracles Beyond

=== Singles ===
- 2020 – "Every Time"
- 2020 – "I Know"
- 2021 – "Listen"
- 2021 – "Sometimes & Yesterdays That Mattered"
- 2021 – "Intention"
- 2022 – "The Long Ride"
- 2022 – "New Hero"
- 2023 – "Wait for the Night"
- 2024 – "Shine for You"
- 2024 – "Days Rollin"
- 2024 – "Miracles Beyond"
- 2025 – "Fiction"

Awards and achievements
Preceded by Victoria with "Growing Up Is Getting Old"	Bulgaria in the Eurovision Song Contest; 2022	Succeeded by Dara with "Bangaranga"
