= PalaTupparello =

Indoor entertainment facility

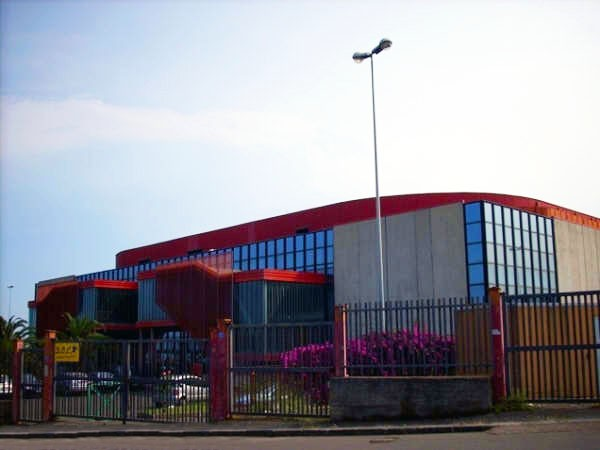
- Interactive map of PalaTupparello
- Full name: PalaTupparello
- Address: Via dello Stadio
- Location: Acireale, Italy
- Coordinates: 37.6028°N 15.1573°E
- Capacity: 8,000

Construction
- Opened: 1993

The PalaTupparello is an indoor venue in Acireale, Italy. It is the largest indoor sports facility in Sicily, as it can hold 8,000 spectators and is also used to host musical performances and concerts. It is located about one kilometre (0.62 mi) from the center of Acireale. The venue was used as a vaccination centre during the COVID-19 pandemic. The venue unsuccessfully applied to host the Eurovision Song Contest 2022 held in Italy.

== Concerts ==
Over the years, the venue has hosted concerts by artists such as Zucchero Fornaciari, Emma Marrone, Ligabue, Alessandra Amoroso, Deep Purple, Jovanotti, Antonello Venditti, Claudio Baglioni, Renato Zero, Laura Pausini, Biagio Antonacci, Vasco Rossi, 50 Cent, Elisa, Giorgia, Ghali, Maluma, Thegiornalisti, Caparezza, Calcutta, Negramaro, Modà, Ultimo, Piero Pelù and Iron Maiden.

== See also ==
- Stadio Tupparello
- List of indoor arenas in Italy
