= Milen Vrabevski =

Bulgarian businessman (born 1968)

- Милен Врабевски
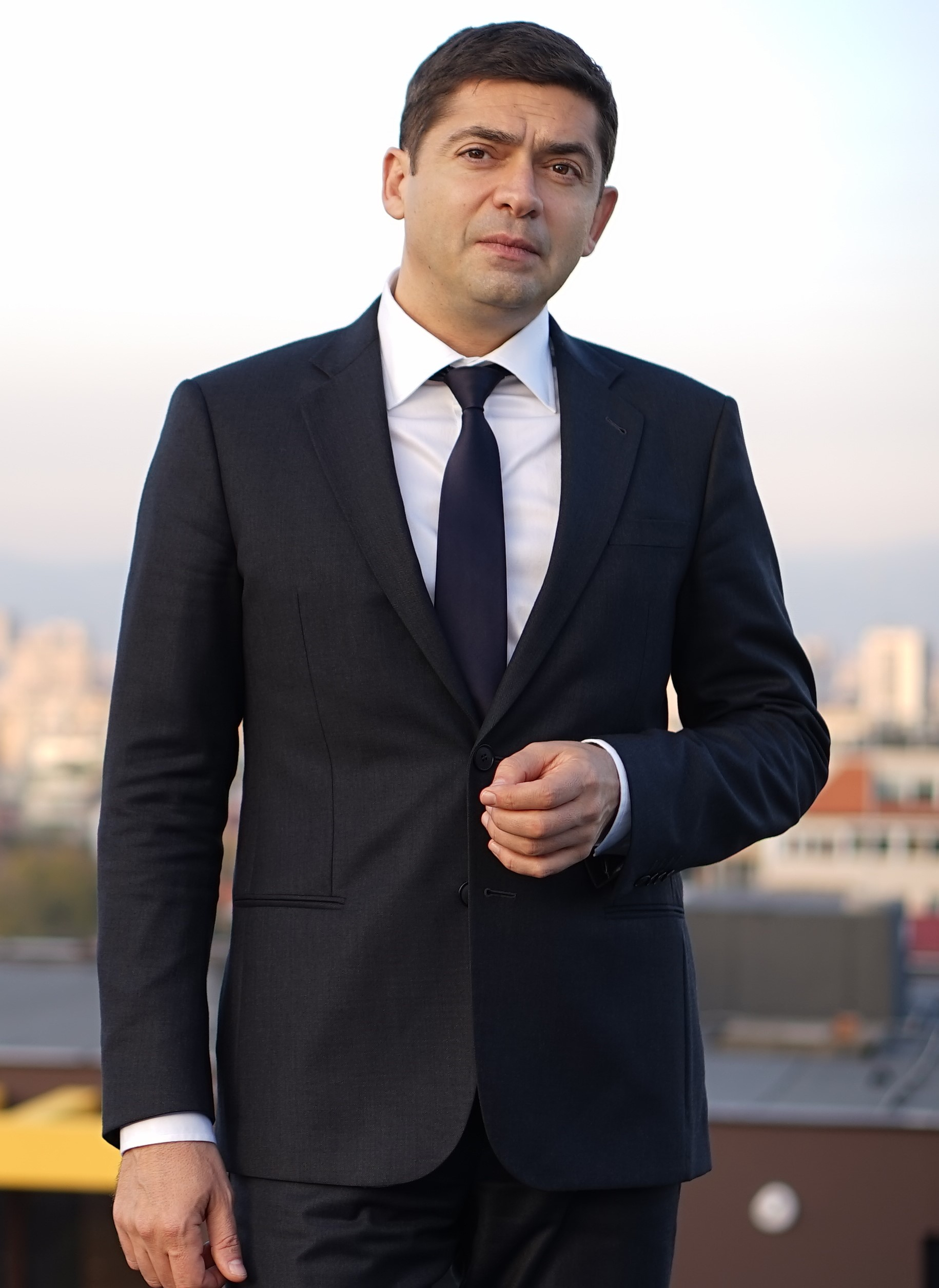
- Vrabevski in 2017
- Born: Milen Nikolaev Vrabevski; 23 December 1968 (age 57); Varna, Bulgaria
- Education: Medical University of Varna
- Website: Bulgarian Memory Foundation; Comac Medical; Intelligent Music

Milen Nikolaev Vrabevski (Bulgarian: Милен Николаев Врабевски) is a Bulgarian businessman, philanthropist, and patron of the arts. He is the founder and chairman of the Bulgarian Memory Foundation. He is a shareholder in Comac Medical, a contract research organization providing development, management, and control of R&D projects in clinical medicine. The company conducts research in 28 countries, covering Europe, Asia, and North America. Vrabevski is also the owner of the Tzar Simeon Veliki educational institute.

== Education and business ==
Milen Vrabevski graduated from the English-language class of the First Language School (1987) and the Medical University (1995) in his native city of Varna. He completed his mandatory military service in the Bulgarian Navy in the radio and telegraph division between 1987 and 1989. He specialized in R&D project management and system auditing in Germany, France, the UK, the US, and Israel between 1996 and 2002. He founded the CRO/SMO Comac Medical in 1997.

In 2002, Vrabevski founded the Association for Good Clinical Practice and Clinical Research Development. He was a member of the Advisory Council Europe of the Drug Information Association between 2006 and 2009.

== Music production ==
In 2010, Vrabevski established the music production company Intelligent Music for the popularization of contemporary Bulgarian music and culture. Intelligent Music is listed in the Registry of Cultural Organizations at the Ministry of Culture of the Republic of Bulgaria.

Soon after Intelligent Music's founding, the international rock collaboration Intelligent Music Project came into being. Over the years, various prominent rock musicians have taken part in the project, including, Joseph Williams (Toto) Simon Phillips (Toto, Protocol), Ronnie Romero (Rainbow), John Payne (Asia), and Carl Sentance (Nazareth).

== Philanthropy ==
Vrabevski is founding chairman of the Bulgarian Memory Foundation, established in 2007.

== Awards and recognition ==
Vrabevski received the 2013 European Citizens' Prize awarded by the European Parliament. The same year, he was awarded the Honorary Badge with Ribbon of the Mayor of Varna. He has been a member of the Clinton Global Initiative since 2012 and was recognized in 2011 by the Bulgarian Donors' Forum as "Man of the Year with an exceptional contribution to the cause of philanthropy in Bulgaria". In 2009, the Association of Bulgarians in Ukraine voted him "Man of the Year" for his exceptional contribution to the promotion of the economic and cultural relations between Ukraine and Bulgaria. In 2012, Mihail Formuzal, governor of the Autonomous Territorial Unit of Gagauzia, conferred the 20th Anniversary State Medal on him.

In 2014, Vrabevski received the Individual Donor with Cause award from the Workshop for Civic Initiatives Foundation and was elected "Enlightener of the Year" in a national campaign organized by Radio FM+.

In 2016, Vrabevski received the Pythagoras Award of the Bulgarian Ministry of Education and Science (MES) on behalf of his company Comac Medical, for "Company with the Largest Investments in Science". During the same year, he also received the "Apostle of the Bulgarian National Spirit" award for his significant contribution to the preservation and promotion of Bulgarian cultural and historical heritage. In November 2016, he became a member of the Public Council of the Bulgarian National Radio.

In 2017 Vrabevski was awarded honorary citizenship of Varna for his exceptional contributions in the sphere of Bulgarian culture and education and for his activities as a philanthropist, patriot, and musician.

In 2019, he was named Man of the Year in Bulgaria.

In 2020, Vrabevski was included in the "Doctors We Trust 2020" edition compiled by the newspaper 24 Hours.
