= Ireland in the Eurovision Song Contest 2023 =

- Eurovision Song Contest 2023
- Participating broadcaster: Raidió Teilifís Éireann (RTÉ)
- Country: Ireland
- Selection process: Eurosong 2023
- Selection date: 3 February 2023

Competing entry
- Song: "We Are One"
- Artist: Wild Youth
- Songwriters: Conor O'Donohoe; Ed Porter; Jörgen Elofsson

Placement
- Semi-final result: Failed to qualify (12th)

Participation chronology

Ireland was represented at the Eurovision Song Contest 2023 with the song "We Are One", written by Conor O'Donohoe, Ed Porter, and Jörgen Elofsson, and performed by Wild Youth. The Irish participating broadcaster, Raidió Teilifís Éireann (RTÉ), organised the national final Eurosong 2023 in order to select its entry for the contest. Six songs faced the votes of an international jury, a national jury and a public televote which ultimately resulted in the selection of the Irish Eurovision entry.

Ireland was drawn to compete in the first semi-final of the Eurovision Song Contest which took place on 9 May 2023. Performing during the show in position 6, "We Are One" was not announced among the top 10 entries of the first semi-final and therefore did not qualify to compete in the final. It was later revealed that Ireland placed 12th out of the 15 participating countries in the semi-final with 10 points.

== Background ==
Prior to the 2023 contest, Raidió Teilifís Éireann (RTÉ) and its predecessor national broadcasters have participated in the Eurovision Song Contest representing Ireland fifty-four times since RÉ's first entry in 1965. They have won the contest a record seven times in total, the most out of any country. Their first win came in 1970, with "All Kinds of Everything" performed by Dana. Ireland holds the record for being the only country to win the Eurovision Song contest three times in a row (in 1992, 1993, and 1994), as well as having the only three-time winner (Johnny Logan, who won in 1980 as a singer, 1987 as a singer-songwriter, and again in 1992 as a songwriter). Since 2013, only two Irish entries managed to qualify for the final: "Only Love Survives" by Ryan Dolan which placed 26th (last) in the final in 2013, and "Together" by Ryan O'Shaughnessy which placed 16th in the final in 2018. The Irish entry in 2022, "That's Rich" performed by Brooke, once again failed to qualify to the final.

As part of its duties as participating broadcaster, RTÉ organises the selection of its entry in the Eurovision Song Contest and broadcasts the event in the country. The broadcaster confirmed its intentions to participate at the 2023 contest on 11 September 2022. From 2016 to 2021, RTÉ held an internal selection to choose the artist and song to represent Ireland at the contest, while RTÉ set up the national final Eurosong in 2022 to choose both the song and performer, with both the public and jury involved in the selection. For the 2023 contest, RTÉ announced on 30 September 2022 the organisation of Eurosong 2023.

== Before Eurovision ==
=== Eurosong 2023 ===
Eurosong 2023 was the national final format developed by RTÉ in order to select its entry for the Eurovision Song Contest 2023. The competition was held on 3 February 2023 at the Studio 4 of RTÉ in Dublin, hosted by Ryan Tubridy with Marty Whelan reporting from the green room and broadcast on RTÉ One during a special edition of The Late Late Show. The show was also broadcast online via the RTÉ Player. The national final was watched by 472,000 viewers in Ireland with a market share of 44%.

==== Competing entries ====
On 30 September 2022, RTÉ opened a submission period where artists and composers were able to submit their entries for the competition until 28 October 2022. At the closing of the deadline, 330 entries were received. The competing entries were selected through two phases involving a jury panel with members appointed by RTÉ; the first phase involved 60 entries being shortlisted after all of the submissions were reviewed, while the second phase involved the six finalists being selected. The finalists were presented on 9 January 2023 during The Ryan Tubridy Show broadcast on RTÉ Radio 1.

| Artist | Song | Songwriter(s) |
|---|---|---|
| Adgy | "Too Good for Your Love" | Andrew Carr, Peter Solymosi |
| Connolly | "Midnight Summer Night" | Jennifer Connolly |
| K Muni and ND | "Down in the Rain" | Kofi Appiah, Nevlonne Dampare |
| Leila Jane | "Wild" | Leila Jane Keeney, Liis Hainla, Arto Ruotsala, Aaron Sibley |
| Public Image Ltd | "Hawaii" | John Lydon, Lu Edmonds, Scott Firth, Bruce Smith |
| Wild Youth | "We Are One" | Conor O'Donohoe, Ed Porter, Jörgen Elofsson |

==== Final ====
The national final took place on 3 February 2023 and featured guest performances from upcoming Irish artists and former contest winner Niamh Kavanagh as well as commentary from a panel that consisted of former contestant Jedward, singer-songwriter Ruth-Anne Cunningham, radio presenter and singer-songwriter Gemma Bradley and opera singer Celine Byrne. Following the combination of votes from an international jury, a national jury and public televoting, "We Are One" performed by Wild Youth was selected as the winner. The international jury panel consisted of former contest winner for Denmark Emmelie de Forest, Slovenian composer and producer Žiga Pirnat, Ukrainian Head of Delegation Oksana Skybinska and British contest expert Paul Jordan, while the national jury panel consisted of musician Paul McLoone and presenters Brendan O'Loughlin and Louise Cantillon.

Final – 3 February 2023
| R/O | Artist | Song | Jury | | Televote | Total | Place |
| R/O | Artist | Song | Intl. | National | Televote | Total | Place |
|---|---|---|---|---|---|---|---|
| 1 | Leila Jane | "Wild" | 2 | 2 | 2 | 6 | 6 |
| 2 | Adgy | "Too Good for Your Love" | 8 | 4 | 4 | 16 | 5 |
| 3 | Public Image Ltd | "Hawaii" | 6 | 6 | 6 | 18 | 4 |
| 4 | Connolly | "Midnight Summer Night" | 12 | 10 | 10 | 32 | 2 |
| 5 | Wild Youth | "We Are One" | 10 | 12 | 12 | 34 | 1 |
| 6 | K Muni and ND | "Down in the Rain" | 4 | 8 | 8 | 20 | 3 |

=== Promotion ===
Wild Youth made several appearances across Europe to specifically promote "We Are One" as the Irish Eurovision entry. On 1 April, Wild Youth performed during the Polish Eurovision Party, which was held at the Praga Centrum in Warsaw, Poland and hosted by Poli Genova and Konrad Zemlik. Between 2 and 4 April, the band took part in promotional activities in Tel Aviv, Israel and performed during the Israel Calling event held at Hangar 11 of the Tel Aviv Port. The band also performed during the PrePartyES event, which was held on 8 April at the Sala La Riviera venue in Madrid, Spain and hosted by Victor Escudero, SuRie and Ruslana, and during the Eurovision in Concert event which was held on 15 April at the AFAS Live venue in Amsterdam, Netherlands and hosted by Cornald Maas and Hila Noorzai. On 16 April, Wild Youth performed the London Eurovision Party, which was held at the Here at Outernet venue in London, United Kingdom and hosted by Nicki French and Paddy O'Connell.

In addition to their international appearances, Wild Youth also completed promotional appearances in Ireland where they performed "We Are One" on the RTÉ One programme The Late Late Show on 29 April.

== At Eurovision ==
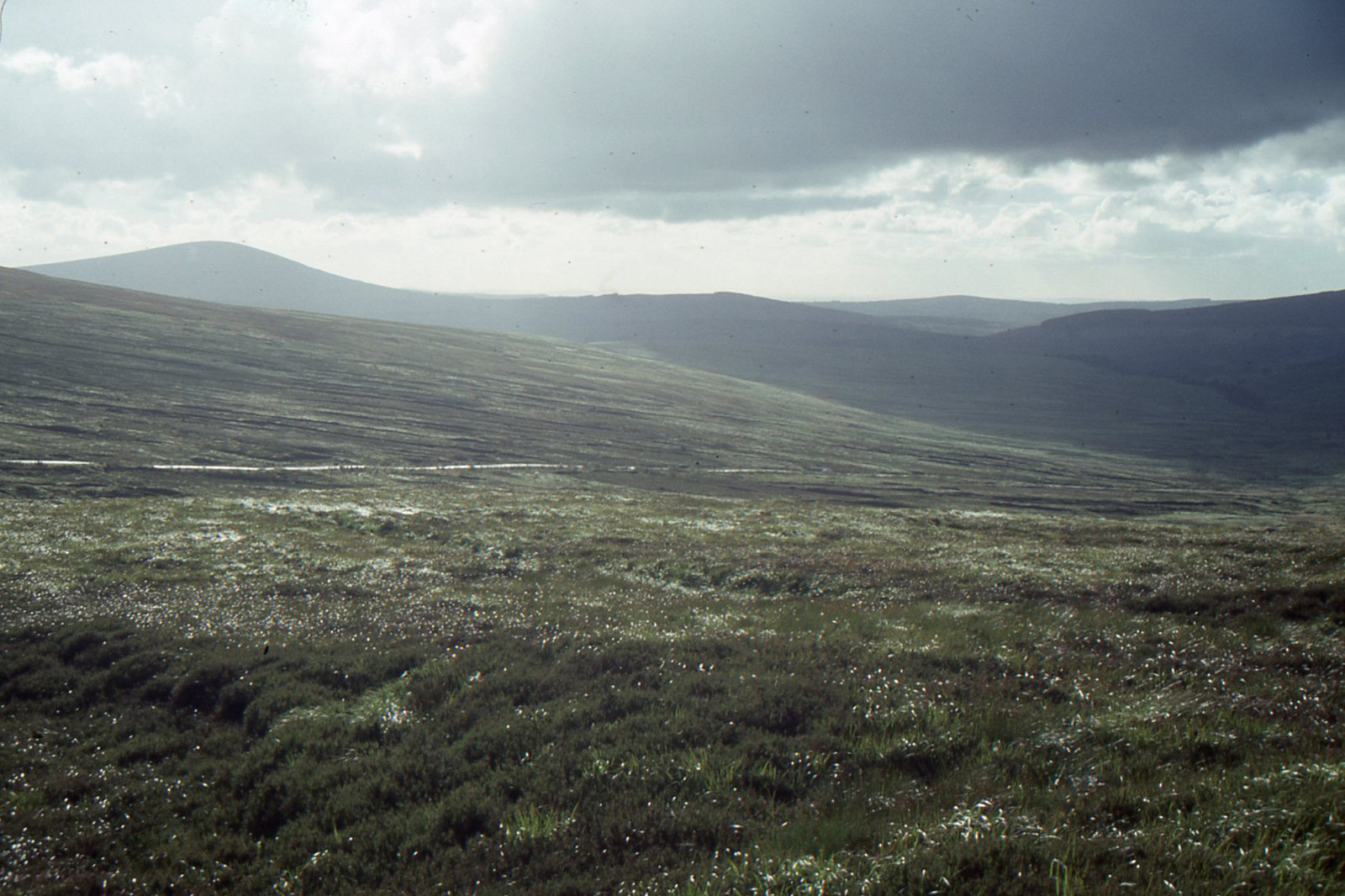
A video postcard introduced Wild Youth's performance in the first semi-final of the Eurovision Song Contest 2023. The postcard was filmed at the Sally Gap in County Wicklow in March 2023 in collaboration with the host broadcaster BBC. The Isle of Wight's Military Road and the Ivano-Frankivsk Oblast region also featured in the Irish postcard.

According to Eurovision rules, all nations with the exceptions of the host country and the "Big Five" (France, Germany, Italy, Spain and the United Kingdom) are required to qualify from one of two semi-finals in order to compete for the final; the top ten countries from each semi-final progress to the final. The European Broadcasting Union (EBU) split up the competing countries into six different pots based on voting patterns from previous contests, with countries with favourable voting histories put into the same pot. On 31 January 2023, an allocation draw was held, which placed each country into one of the two semi-finals, and determined which half of the show they would perform in. Ireland was placed into the first semi-final, held on 9 May 2023, and was performed in the first half of the show.

Once all the competing songs for the 2023 contest had been released, the running order for the semi-finals was decided by the shows' producers rather than through another draw, so that similar songs were not placed next to each other. Ireland was set to perform in position 6, following the entry from Portugal and before the entry from Croatia.

In Ireland, the first semi-final and the final were broadcast on RTÉ One and the second semi-final was broadcast on RTÉ2. Marty Whelan provided commentary for Irish television viewers on all three shows. The first semi-final and the final were also broadcast via radio on RTÉ 2fm with commentary by Zbyszek Zalinski and Neil Doherty. Over 371,000 viewers watched the live broadcast of the final on RTÉ One and its timeshift channel RTÉ One +1, which represented a 38% market share and marked it as RTÉ's most watched programme for that weekend.

=== Semi-final ===
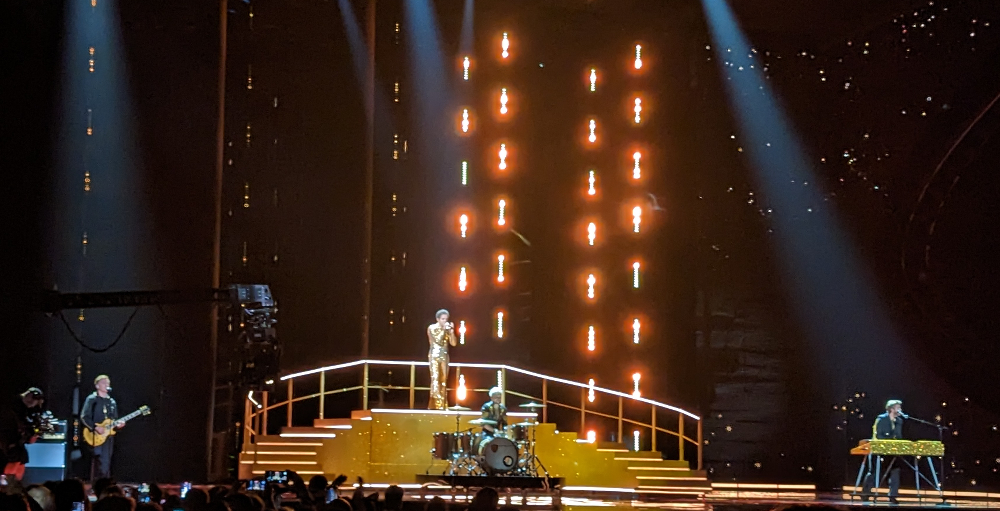
Wild Youth during a rehearsal before the first semi-final

Wild Youth took part in technical rehearsals on 30 April and 3 May, followed by dress rehearsals on 8 and 9 May. This included the jury show on 8 May where the professional back-up juries of each country watched and voted in a result used if any issues with public televoting occurred.

The Irish performance featured Wild Youth performing in a band set-up. The performance began with lead singer Conor O'Donohoe on a horseshoe-shaped LED staircase, where he later descended from to join the other members in front of the staircase. The staging lighting was in gold and black with the LED floor displaying blue and pink dots and pyrotechnic effects being used during the second chorus. The creative team that worked on producing Ireland's performance was led by Ian Banham, however, Wild Youth announced before the contest that they had split with Banham after transphobic comments were found to have been posted by him on social media.

At the end of the show, Ireland was not announced among the top 10 entries in the first semi-final and therefore failed to qualify to compete in the final. It was later revealed that Ireland placed twelfth in the semi-final, receiving a total of 10 points.

=== Voting ===
Voting during the three shows involved each country awarding sets of points from 1-8, 10 and 12: one from their professional jury and the other from televoting in the final vote, while the semi-final vote was based entirely on the vote of the public. Each nation's jury consisted of five music industry professionals who are citizens of the country they represent. This jury judged each entry based on: vocal capacity; the stage performance; the song's composition and originality; and the overall impression by the act. In addition, each member of a national jury may only take part in the panel once every three years, and no jury was permitted to discuss of their vote with other members or be related in any way to any of the competing acts in such a way that they cannot vote impartially and independently. The individual rankings of each jury member in an anonymised form as well as the nation's televoting results were released shortly after the grand final.

Below is a breakdown of points awarded to Ireland and awarded by Ireland in the first semi-final and grand final of the contest, and the breakdown of the jury voting and televoting conducted during the two shows:

==== Points awarded to Ireland ====
Points awarded to Ireland (Semi-final 1)
| Score | Televote |
|---|---|
| 12 points | |
| 10 points | |
| 8 points | |
| 7 points | |
| 6 points | |
| 5 points | |
| 4 points | |
| 3 points | Malta; Norway |
| 2 points | Portugal |
| 1 point | Latvia; Switzerland |

==== Points awarded by Ireland ====
Points awarded by Ireland (Semi-final 1)
| Score | Televote |
|---|---|
| 12 points | Finland |
| 10 points | Moldova |
| 8 points | Sweden |
| 7 points | Switzerland |
| 6 points | Israel |
| 5 points | Croatia |
| 4 points | Latvia |
| 3 points | Czech Republic |
| 2 points | Norway |
| 1 point | Portugal |

Points awarded by Ireland (Final)
| Score | Televote | Jury |
|---|---|---|
| 12 points | Finland | Sweden |
| 10 points | Lithuania | Belgium |
| 8 points | Poland | Finland |
| 7 points | Ukraine | Israel |
| 6 points | Sweden | Armenia |
| 5 points | Norway | France |
| 4 points | Moldova | Australia |
| 3 points | Belgium | Czech Republic |
| 2 points | Croatia | United Kingdom |
| 1 point | Israel | Lithuania |

==== Detailed voting results ====
The following members comprised the Irish jury:

- Paul McLoone
- Brooke Scullion
- Erica-Cody Kennedy-Smith
- Kellie Lewis

Detailed voting results from Ireland (Semi-final 1)
| R/O | Country | Televote | |
| R/O | Country | Rank | Points |
|---|---|---|---|
| 01 | Norway | 9 | 2 |
| 02 | Malta | 13 | |
| 03 | Serbia | 14 | |
| 04 | Latvia | 7 | 4 |
| 05 | Portugal | 10 | 1 |
| 06 | Ireland | | |
| 07 | Croatia | 6 | 5 |
| 08 | Switzerland | 4 | 7 |
| 09 | Israel | 5 | 6 |
| 10 | Moldova | 2 | 10 |
| 11 | Sweden | 3 | 8 |
| 12 | Azerbaijan | 12 | |
| 13 | Czech Republic | 8 | 3 |
| 14 | Netherlands | 11 | |
| 15 | Finland | 1 | 12 |

Detailed voting results from Ireland (Final)
| R/O | Country | Jury | | | | | | Televote | |
| R/O | Country | Juror 1 | Juror 2 | Juror 3 | Juror 4 | Rank | Points | Rank | Points |
|---|---|---|---|---|---|---|---|---|---|
| 01 | Austria | 23 | 13 | 12 | 20 | 21 | | 15 | |
| 02 | Portugal | 11 | 14 | 21 | 26 | 22 | | 22 | |
| 03 | Switzerland | 24 | 12 | 16 | 18 | 23 | | 13 | |
| 04 | Poland | 22 | 15 | 17 | 23 | 24 | | 3 | 8 |
| 05 | Serbia | 25 | 25 | 14 | 6 | 15 | | 24 | |
| 06 | France | 3 | 7 | 11 | 15 | 6 | 5 | 14 | |
| 07 | Cyprus | 20 | 23 | 13 | 11 | 19 | | 17 | |
| 08 | Spain | 17 | 20 | 25 | 4 | 13 | | 23 | |
| 09 | Sweden | 2 | 2 | 4 | 3 | 1 | 12 | 5 | 6 |
| 10 | Albania | 18 | 19 | 24 | 17 | 25 | | 25 | |
| 11 | Italy | 8 | 18 | 15 | 12 | 14 | | 12 | |
| 12 | Estonia | 13 | 16 | 3 | 14 | 11 | | 20 | |
| 13 | Finland | 5 | 8 | 6 | 1 | 3 | 8 | 1 | 12 |
| 14 | Czech Republic | 7 | 9 | 10 | 5 | 8 | 3 | 18 | |
| 15 | Australia | 21 | 24 | 1 | 10 | 7 | 4 | 16 | |
| 16 | Belgium | 1 | 1 | 2 | 19 | 2 | 10 | 8 | 3 |
| 17 | Armenia | 12 | 11 | 7 | 2 | 5 | 6 | 26 | |
| 18 | Moldova | 14 | 10 | 18 | 13 | 17 | | 7 | 4 |
| 19 | Ukraine | 9 | 22 | 19 | 22 | 20 | | 4 | 7 |
| 20 | Norway | 10 | 17 | 9 | 25 | 16 | | 6 | 5 |
| 21 | Germany | 19 | 6 | 22 | 7 | 12 | | 19 | |
| 22 | Lithuania | 16 | 3 | 8 | 16 | 10 | 1 | 2 | 10 |
| 23 | Israel | 6 | 5 | 5 | 8 | 4 | 7 | 10 | 1 |
| 24 | Slovenia | 15 | 21 | 23 | 9 | 18 | | 21 | |
| 25 | Croatia | 26 | 26 | 26 | 24 | 26 | | 9 | 2 |
| 26 | United Kingdom | 4 | 4 | 20 | 21 | 9 | 2 | 11 | |
