= We Are Domi =

Czech-Norwegian electropop band

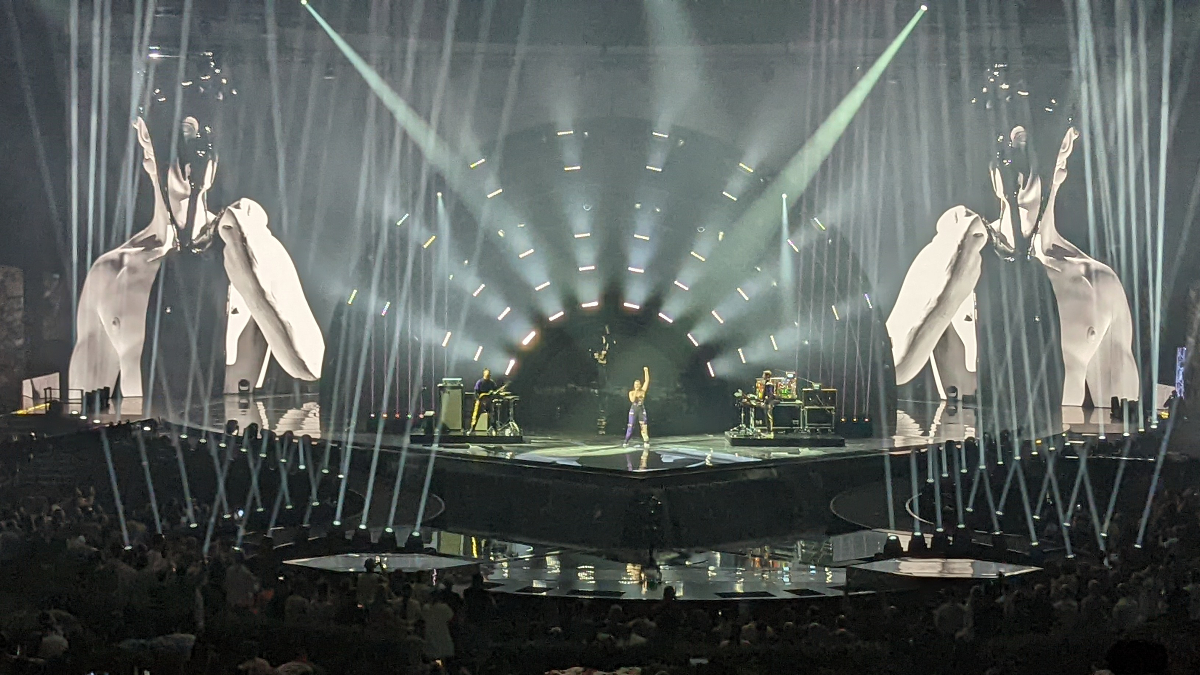
- We Are Domi at the Eurovision Song Contest 2022

Background information
- Also known as: DOMI
- Origin: Prague, Czech Republic; Leeds, United Kingdom
- Genres: Electropop; Scandipop
- Years active: 2016–present
- Members: Dominika Hašková; Casper Hatlestad; Benjamin Rekstad
- Past members: Jostein Braaten; Jemma Freese; Theo Goss; Paolo Mazzoni

We Are Domi, formerly known as Domi (stylised in all caps), is a Czech-Norwegian-British electropop band formed in Leeds, United Kingdom in 2016. The band consists of lead vocalist Dominika Hašková, guitarist Casper Hatlestad, and keyboardist Benjamin Rekstad. The three met during their studies at the Leeds College of Music.

Having won the Czech national selection ESCZ 2022 in December 2021, the band represented the Czech Republic in the Eurovision Song Contest 2022 with the song "Lights Off".

== History ==
We Are Domi was originally founded as a one-time project to serve as Hašková's backup band for an examination concert in 2016. Besides Hašková, Hatlestad and Rekstad, it included Norwegian drummer Jostein Braaten, and British keyboardist and backing vocalist Jemma Freese, who were all studying at the Leeds College of Music at the time. After the project, they decided to continue making music together. In 2019, their debut single "Let Me Follow" was released. Braaten and Freese later left the band. In 2020, the band relocated from the United Kingdom to Prague, Czech Republic.

=== Eurovision Song Contest 2022 ===
In 2021, the band was announced as one of the seven acts participating in the music competition ESCZ 2022, which served as the Czech national selection for the Eurovision Song Contest 2022. The winner was determined by a combination of votes from an international jury panel (50%), votes from the international public (25%), and votes from the Czech public (25%). Votes could be cast between 7 and 15 December 2021 via the official Eurovision Song Contest app. On 16 December 2021, "Lights Off" by We Are Domi was announced as the winner, having received a total of 21 points.

At the Eurovision Song Contest in Turin We Are Domi, representing the Czech Republic, were the last to perform in the second semi-final, closing the show. They finished in 4th place with 227 points (a combination of 102 jury points and 125 televote points), meaning that they qualified to the grand final. This was the fourth time the Czech Republic qualified to the final of the Eurovision Song Contest. We Are Domi opened the final, performing first out of 25 countries. Ultimately, they finished in 22nd place, with 38 points (33 jury, 5 televote).

== Members ==
Dominika Hašková is a Czech-American singer, songwriter and musical actress. She was born on 3 May 1995 in Buffalo, New York to Czech parents. Her father is the well-known ice hockey player Dominik Hašek, who played for the Buffalo Sabres at the time of her birth. In 2010, Hašková participated in the first season of the talent show Česko Slovensko má talent, reaching the final. In 2013, she played the role of Florence Vassy in the Czech version of the musical Chess.

Casper Hatlestad and Benjamin Rekstad are Norwegian musicians and songwriters. Hatlestad was born on 8 April 1994, and grew up in Sola Municipality (near Stavanger), Norway. For his master's project, he developed a "bow guitar" – a guitar that is played with a bow. Rekstad was born on 18 February 1995, and grew up in Nesodden, Norway. Hatlestad and Rekstad have both been members of the bands Skogmus and the Wardrobe Quintet, prior to joining We Are Domi. Since 2020, they have worked as music teachers at the International School of Music and Fine Arts in Prague.

=== Current members ===
- Dominika Hašková (2016–present) – lead vocals
- Casper Hatlestad (2016–present) – guitar
- Benjamin Rekstad (2016–present) – keyboards

=== Former members ===
- Jostein Braaten (2016–2019) – drums
- Jemma Freese (2016–2020) – keyboards, backing vocals
- Theo Goss (2020) – drums
- Paolo Mazzoni (2020) – drums

== Discography ==
=== Extended plays ===
Title	Details
We Are Domi - EP	Released: 14 April 2023; Formats: Digital download, streaming

=== Singles ===
==== As lead artist ====
Title	Year	Peak chart positions				Album
Title	Year	CZE Air.	CZE Local Digital	LTU	SWE Heat.	Album
"Let Me Follow"	2019	—	—	—	—	Non-album singles
"Wouldn't That Be Nice"	2019	—	—	—	—	Non-album singles
"I'm Not Alright"	2020	—	—	—	—	Non-album singles
"Someone New"	2020	—	—	—	—	Non-album singles
"Come Get Lost"	2021	—	—	—	—	Non-album singles
"Lights Off"	2021	17	48	43	4	We Are Domi - EP
"Alive"	2022	—	—	—	—	We Are Domi - EP
"Paradise"	2023	67	—	—	—	We Are Domi - EP
"FU"	2023	—	—	—	—	We Are Domi - EP
"Say the Word"	2023	—	—	—	—	We Are Domi - EP
"Golden"	2023	—	—	—	—	We Are Domi - EP
"Glow"	2024	—	—	—	—	Non-album singles
"Love Every Part of It"	2024	—	—	—	—	Non-album singles
"Underdog"	2025	—	—	—	—	Non-album singles
"Getaway"	2025	10	—	—	—	Non-album singles
"If I'm Honest"	2025	18	—	—	—	Non-album singles
"Strangers"	2025	—	—	—	—	Non-album singles
"—" denotes a recording that did not chart in that territory.

==== As featured artist ====
Title	Year	Album or EP
"High-Speed Kissing" (Lake Malawi featuring We Are Domi)	2022	The Great Video Game Crush

=== Other collaborations ===
Title	Year	Album or EP
"Firme" (Sick Bicers featuring We Are Domi)	2020	Aura
"Novocaine Rush" (Tom Sean featuring We Are Domi)	2024	Stereo Madness

Awards and achievements
Preceded by Benny Cristo with "Omaga"	Czech Republic in the Eurovision Song Contest; 2022	Succeeded by Vesna with "My Sister's Crown"
