= Ireland in the Eurovision Song Contest 2022 =

- Eurovision Song Contest 2022
- Participating broadcaster: Raidió Teilifís Éireann (RTÉ)
- Country: Ireland
- Selection process: Eurosong 2022
- Selection date: 4 February 2022

Competing entry
- Song: "That's Rich"
- Artist: Brooke
- Songwriters: Brooke Scullion; Izzy Warner; Karl Zine

Placement
- Semi-final result: Failed to qualify (15th)

Participation chronology

Ireland was represented at the Eurovision Song Contest 2022 with the song "That's Rich", written by Brooke Scullion, Izzy Warner, and Karl Zine, and performed by Brooke. The Irish participating broadcaster Raidió Teilifís Éireann (RTÉ) organised the national final Eurosong 2022 in order to select its entry for the contest. Six songs faced the votes of an international jury, a studio jury and a public televote which ultimately resulted in the selection of the Irish Eurovision entry.

Ireland was drawn to compete in the second semi-final of the Eurovision Song Contest which took place on 12 May 2022. Performing during the show in position 10, "That's Rich" was not announced among the top 10 entries of the second semi-final and therefore did not qualify to compete in the final. It was later revealed that Ireland placed 15th out of the 18 participating countries in the semi-final with 47 points.

== Background ==
Prior to the 2022 contest, Raidió Teilifís Éireann (RTÉ) and its predecessor national broadcasters, had participated in the Eurovision Song Contest representing Ireland fifty-three times since RÉ's first entry in 1965. Ireland has won the contest a record seven times in total. The country's first win came in 1970, with then-18-year-old Dana winning with "All Kinds of Everything". Ireland holds the record for being the only country to win the contest three times in a row (in 1992, 1993 and 1994), as well as having the only three-time winner (Johnny Logan, who won in 1980 as a singer, 1987 as a singer-songwriter, and again in 1992 as a songwriter). In 2011 and 2012, Jedward represented the nation for two consecutive years, managing to qualify to the final both times and achieve Ireland's highest position in the contest since 2000, placing eighth in 2011 with the song "Lipstick". Since 2013, only two Irish entries managed to qualify for the final: Ryan Dolan's "Only Love Survives" which placed 26th (last) in the final in 2013, and Ryan O'Shaughnessy's "Together" which placed 16th in the final in 2018. The Irish entry in 2021, "Maps" performed by Lesley Roy, once again failed to qualify to the final.

As part of its duties as participating broadcaster, RTÉ organises the selection of its entry in the Eurovision Song Contest and broadcasts the event in the country. The broadcaster confirmed its intentions to participate at the 2022 contest on 6 September 2021. From 2016 to 2021, RTÉ held an internal selection to choose the artist and song to represent Ireland at the contest. For the 2022 contest, RTÉ announced on 16 September 2021 the organisation of the national final Eurosong 2022 to choose the artist and song. This marked the first time since 2015 that RTÉ had set up a national final to select both the artist and song.

== Before Eurovision ==
=== Eurosong 2022 ===
Eurosong 2022 was the national final format developed by RTÉ in order to select Ireland's entry for the Eurovision Song Contest 2022. The competition was held on 4 February 2022 at the Studio 4 of RTÉ in Dublin, hosted by Ryan Tubridy with Marty Whelan reporting from the green room and broadcast on RTÉ One during a special edition of The Late Late Show. The show was also broadcast online via the RTÉ Player. The national final was watched by 451,000 viewers in Ireland with a market share of 40%.

==== Competing entries ====
On 16 September 2021, RTÉ opened a submission period where artists and composers were able to submit their entries for the competition until 22 October 2021. At the closing of the deadline, 320 entries were received. The competing entries were selected through two phases involving two separate jury panels with members appointed by RTÉ; the first phase involved the first jury of 12 members reviewing all of the submissions and shortlisting 20 to 30 entries, while the second phase involved the second jury of 20 to 25 members selecting the six finalists. The finalists were presented between 17 and 21 January 2022 during The Ryan Tubridy Show broadcast on RTÉ Radio 1. Among the competing artists was former contestant Brendan Murray who represented Ireland in 2017.

Artist	Song	Songwriter(s)
Brendan Murray	"Real Love"	Brendan Murray, Darrell Coyle
Brooke	"That's Rich"	Brooke Scullion, Izzy Warner, Karl Zine
Janet Grogan	"Ashes of Yesterday"	Aidan O'Connor, John Emil, Sandra Wikström
Miles Graham	"Yeah, We're Gonna Get Out of It"	Miles Graham Miley, Justin Broad, Paul Herman
Patrick O'Sullivan	"One Night, One Kiss, One Promise"	Nicky Byrne, Lar Kaye, Danny O'Reilly
Rachel Goode	"I'm Loving Me"	Joakim Övrenius, Thomas Karlsson, Johan Mauritzson, Anna Engh

==== Final ====
The national final took place on 4 February 2022 and featured a guest performance from Riverdance as well as commentary from a panel that consisted of singer-songwriter Caroline Corr, singer Lucia Evans, former contest winner Paul Harrington and presenter Bláthnaid Treacy. Following the combination of votes from an international jury, the studio panel and public televoting, "That's Rich" performed by Brooke was selected as the winner. The international jury panel consisted of American journalist William Lee Adams, former Czech Head of Delegation Jan Bors, member of 2021 Icelandic representative Gagnamagnið Árný Fjóla Ásmundsdóttir and Russian Head of Delegation Ekaterina Orlova.

Final – 4 February 2022
R/O	Artist	Song	Jury		Televote	Total	Place
R/O	Artist	Song	Intl.	Studio	Televote	Total	Place
1	Patrick O'Sullivan	"One Night, One Kiss, One Promise"	10	6	6	22	4
2	Janet Grogan	"Ashes of Yesterday"	8	12	4	24	2
3	Brendan Murray	"Real Love"	2	8	2	12	6
4	Miles Graham	"Yeah, We're Gonna Get Out of It"	6	10	8	24	2
5	Rachel Goode	"I'm Loving Me"	4	2	10	16	5
6	Brooke	"That's Rich"	12	4	12	28	1

=== Promotion ===
Brooke made several appearances across Europe to specifically promote "That's Rich" as the Irish Eurovision entry. On 26 March, Brooke performed during the Barcelona Eurovision Party, which was held at the Sala Apolo venue in Barcelona, Spain and hosted by Sharonne and Giuseppe Di Bella. On 3 April, Brooke performed during the London Eurovision Party, which was held at the Hard Rock Hotel in London, United Kingdom and hosted by Paddy O'Connell and SuRie. On 7 April, Brooke performed during the Israel Calling event held at the Menora Mivtachim Arena in Tel Aviv, Israel. On 9 April, Brooke performed during the Eurovision in Concert event which was held at the AFAS Live venue in Amsterdam, Netherlands and hosted by Cornald Maas and Edsilia Rombley. On 16 April, Brooke performed during the PrePartyES 2022 event which was held at the Sala La Riviera venue in Madrid, Spain and hosted by Ruth Lorenzo.

In addition to her international appearances, Brooke also completed promotional appearances in Ireland where she performed "That's Rich" on the RTÉ One programme The Late Late Show on 29 April.

== At Eurovision ==
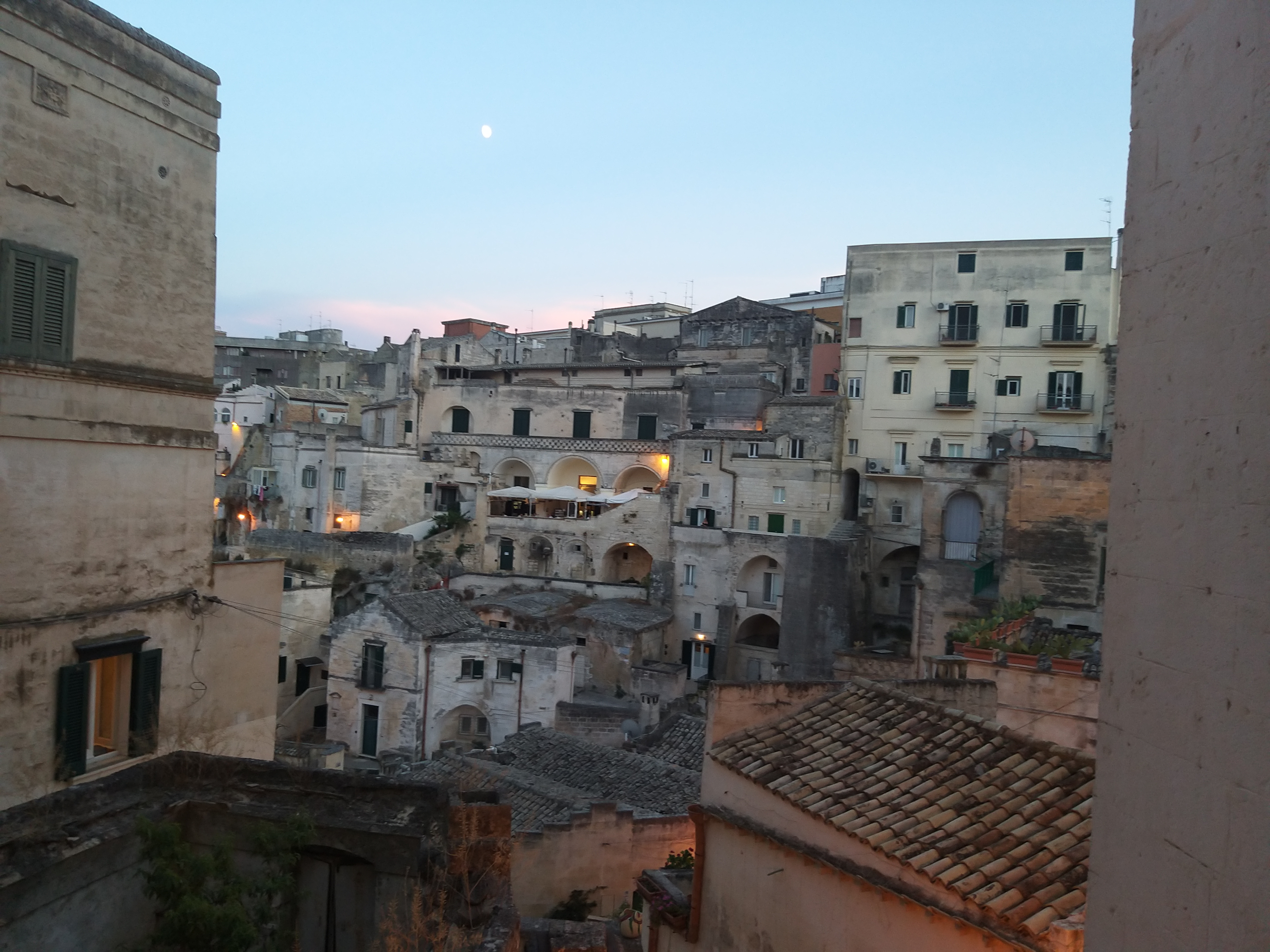
A video postcard introduced the Irish performance in the second semi-final and final of the Eurovision Song Contest 2022. The postcard was filmed in Matera, Basilicata and featured virtual projections of Brooke across the location.

According to Eurovision rules, all nations with the exceptions of the host country and the "Big Five" (France, Germany, Italy, Spain and the United Kingdom) are required to qualify from one of two semi-finals in order to compete for the final; the top ten countries from each semi-final progress to the final. The European Broadcasting Union (EBU) split up the competing countries into six different pots based on voting patterns from previous contests, with countries with favourable voting histories put into the same pot. On 25 January 2022, an allocation draw was held which placed each country into one of the two semi-finals, as well as which half of the show they would perform in. Ireland was placed into the second semi-final, which was held on 12 May 2022, and performed in the second half of the show.

Once all the competing songs for the 2022 contest had been released, the running order for the semi-finals was decided by the shows' producers rather than through another draw, so that similar songs were not placed next to each other. Ireland was set to perform in position 10, following the entry from Cyprus and before the entry from North Macedonia.

In Ireland, the two semi-finals were broadcast on RTÉ2 and the final was broadcast on RTÉ One with all three shows featuring commentary by Marty Whelan. The second semi-final and the final were also broadcast via radio on RTÉ Radio 1 with commentary by Neil Doherty and Zbyszek Zalinski. The Irish spokesperson, who announced the top 12-point score awarded by the Irish jury during the final, was Linda Martin who won the contest for Ireland in 1992.

=== Semi-final ===
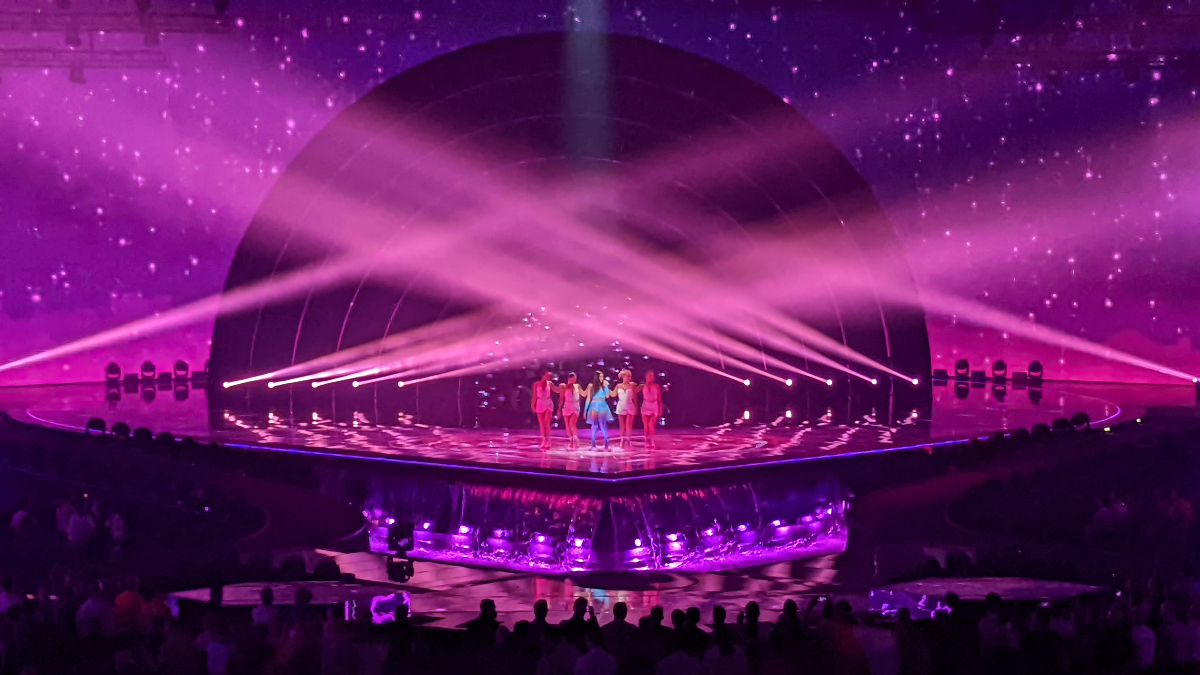
Brooke during a rehearsal before the second semi-final

Brooke took part in technical rehearsals on 3 and 6 May, followed by dress rehearsals on 11 and 12 May. This included the jury show on 11 May where the professional juries of each country watched and voted on the competing entries.

The Irish performance featured Brooke performing a dance routine together with four dancers. The stage colours were in blue and pink with the stage floor displaying projections that included a beating heart. The creative team that worked on producing Ireland's performance was led by Emer Walsh, while the dancers that joined Brooke on stage were Amy Ford, Amy Whearity, Lizzy Benham and Sophie Kavanagh.

At the end of the show, Ireland was not announced among the top 10 entries in the second semi-final and therefore failed to qualify to compete in the final. It was later revealed that Ireland placed fifteenth in the semi-final, receiving a total of 47 points: 35 points from the televoting and 12 points from the juries.

=== Voting ===
Voting during the three shows involved each country awarding two sets of points from 1-8, 10 and 12: one from their professional jury and the other from televoting. Each nation's jury consisted of five music industry professionals who are citizens of the country they represent, with a diversity in gender and age represented. The judges assess each entry based on the performances during the second Dress Rehearsal of each show, which takes place the night before each live show, against a set of criteria including: vocal capacity; the stage performance; the song's composition and originality; and the overall impression by the act. Jury members may only take part in panel once every three years, and are obliged to confirm that they are not connected to any of the participating acts in a way that would impact their ability to vote impartially. Jury members should also vote independently, with no discussion of their vote permitted with other jury members. The exact composition of the professional jury, and the results of each country's jury and televoting were released after the grand final; the individual results from each jury member were also released in an anonymised form.

Below is a breakdown of points awarded to Ireland and awarded by Ireland in the second semi-final and grand final of the contest, and the breakdown of the jury voting and televoting conducted during the two shows:

==== Points awarded to Ireland ====
Points awarded to Ireland (Semi-final 2)
Score	Televote	Jury
12 points	United Kingdom	
10 points		
8 points	Australia	
7 points	Spain	
6 points		Australia
5 points		
4 points		Estonia
3 points	Israel; Malta	
2 points		
1 point	Belgium; Czech Republic	Belgium; Cyprus

==== Points awarded by Ireland ====
Points awarded by Ireland (Semi-final 2)
Score	Televote	Jury
12 points	Poland	Sweden
10 points	Sweden	Czech Republic
8 points	Czech Republic	Estonia
7 points	Australia	Serbia
6 points	Estonia	Malta
5 points	Romania	Australia
4 points	Serbia	Cyprus
3 points	Malta	Israel
2 points	Belgium	Belgium
1 point	Finland	North Macedonia

Points awarded by Ireland (Final)
Score	Televote	Jury
12 points	Ukraine	Spain
10 points	Poland	Sweden
8 points	Lithuania	United Kingdom
7 points	Moldova	Czech Republic
6 points	United Kingdom	Italy
5 points	Spain	Serbia
4 points	Norway	Portugal
3 points	Sweden	Ukraine
2 points	Romania	Australia
1 point	Serbia	Iceland

==== Detailed voting results ====
The following members comprised the Irish jury:

- Bláthnaid Treacy
- Deirdre Crookes
- Julian Vignoles
- Niamh Kavanagh
- Phillip McMahon

Detailed voting results from Ireland (Semi-final 2)
R/O	Country	Jury							Televote	
R/O	Country	Juror A	Juror B	Juror C	Juror D	Juror E	Rank	Points	Rank	Points
01	Finland	11	12	15	16	13	16		10	1
02	Israel	16	6	17	3	4	8	3	14	
03	Serbia	5	5	2	17	16	4	7	7	4
04	Azerbaijan	17	7	13	12	7	13		15	
05	Georgia	10	16	14	11	17	15		12	
06	Malta	1	9	11	13	6	5	6	8	3
07	San Marino	15	13	9	6	5	11		11	
08	Australia	12	4	6	4	10	6	5	4	7
09	Cyprus	6	10	7	10	3	7	4	13	
10	Ireland									
11	North Macedonia	8	8	3	14	11	10	1	16	
12	Estonia	3	2	10	7	8	3	8	5	6
13	Romania	14	14	8	9	9	14		6	5
14	Poland	13	11	5	8	12	12		1	12
15	Montenegro	9	17	16	15	15	17		17	
16	Belgium	7	3	12	5	14	9	2	9	2
17	Sweden	2	1	1	1	2	1	12	2	10
18	Czech Republic	4	15	4	2	1	2	10	3	8

Detailed voting results from Ireland (Final)
R/O	Country	Jury							Televote	
R/O	Country	Juror A	Juror B	Juror C	Juror D	Juror E	Rank	Points	Rank	Points
01	Czech Republic	4	4	3	6	4	4	7	20	
02	Romania	13	6	11	23	13	14		9	2
03	Portugal	8	13	8	3	10	7	4	14	
04	Finland	24	25	24	22	25	25		16	
05	Switzerland	10	19	21	20	21	20		24	
06	France	15	24	12	21	20	21		18	
07	Norway	22	7	5	24	12	12		7	4
08	Armenia	21	9	22	13	15	17		23	
09	Italy	5	17	14	4	1	5	6	13	
10	Spain	2	1	2	5	3	1	12	6	5
11	Netherlands	12	16	18	18	16	18		12	
12	Ukraine	7	8	10	11	7	8	3	1	12
13	Germany	25	23	16	12	14	19		15	
14	Lithuania	16	21	15	17	24	22		3	8
15	Azerbaijan	17	15	9	15	19	16		25	
16	Belgium	18	20	20	16	23	23		22	
17	Greece	14	12	17	8	11	15		19	
18	Iceland	3	10	19	10	18	10	1	21	
19	Moldova	19	22	25	25	22	24		4	7
20	Sweden	6	2	4	2	2	2	10	8	3
21	Australia	23	5	6	19	9	9	2	17	
22	United Kingdom	11	3	1	1	8	3	8	5	6
23	Poland	20	14	7	9	5	11		2	10
24	Serbia	1	18	23	14	6	6	5	10	1
25	Estonia	9	11	13	7	17	13		11	
