= The Late Late Show season 51 =

The 51st season of The Late Late Show, the world's longest-running chat show, began on 7 September 2012 and concluded on 31 May 2013. Ryan Tubridy's fourth season as host, it aired on RTÉ One each Friday evening from 21:30. However, he did not complete the entire season, and former host Pat Kenny made an unexpected return as presenter on 1 February 2013, announced RTÉ on 30 January 2013.

== Tubridy's plans and pre-season events ==
In September 2012, Tubridy announced his intention to quit after three more seasons as host, and accepted a reduction in his pay to €373,000. U.S. insurer Liberty Insurance sponsored this season, having inherited this from its takeover of Quinn Insurance, the previous sponsor. The Late Late Toy Show took place on 30 November 2012, as announced by Ryan Tubridy in the season's second episode on 14 September.

== First episode ==
In the first episode on 7 September, guests included members of Ireland's Olympic boxing team. Katie Taylor, John Joe Nevin, Paddy Barnes, and Michael Conlan were all present along with RTÉ Sport's commentator Jimmy Magee. Also on the show were comedian Chris O'Dowd with music from the Heathers and Melanie C.

== Fourth episode ==
=== Donegal Gaelic football team "interview" ===
On 28 September 2012, the victorious Donegal team appeared on The Late Late Show with the Sam Maguire Cup after winning the 2012 All-Ireland Senior Football Championship Final. Tubridy spoke with team captain Michael Murphy and manager Jim McGuinness who said they would be out to defend their title in 2013. The "interview" was criticised by many—its shortness was contrasted with the full sit-down interview Tubridy conducted with Dublin the previous year—, and UTV broadcaster Adrian Logan called it a "disgrace".

=== Jamelia revelation ===
Later on 28 September 2012, singer Jamelia confirmed on The Late Late Show that she would be the new judge on The Voice of Ireland.

== Twentieth episode ==
On 25 January 2013, Fiona Doyle thanked everyone for their support in her court case against her own father during an interview on The Late Late Show.

== Music showcase initiative ==
On 26 January 2013, RTÉ announced that The Late Late Show would launch a music showcase initiative for emerging Irish acts to appear on Irish television.

== Return of the Kenny ==
Former host Pat Kenny made an unexpected return as presenter of The Late Late Show on 1 February 2013, announced RTÉ on 30 January 2013 following the death of the father of regular host Ryan Tubridy.

== Tom Cruise ==
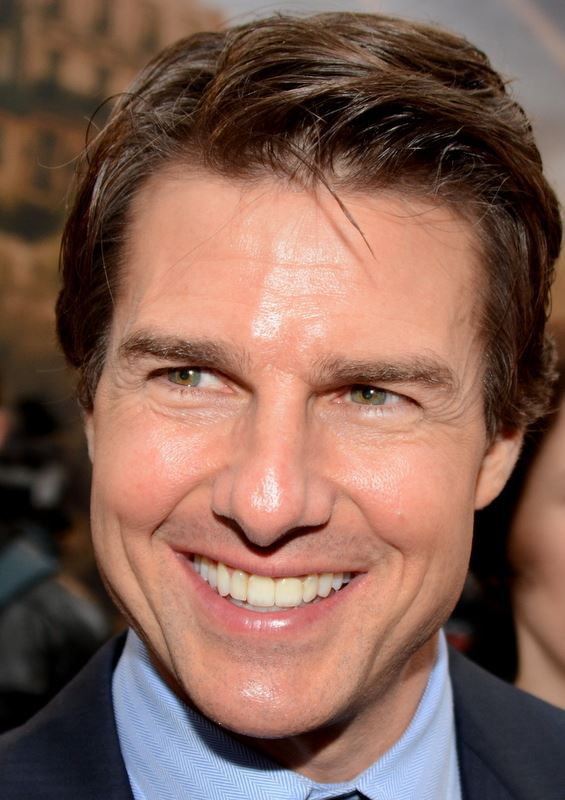
Tom Cruise

Tom Cruise gave a pre-recorded interview to Tubridy during his promotional visit to Ireland in early April 2013. Cruise was in Ireland as part of a heavy promotion campaign to mark the release upon Ireland of Oblivion, a melodramatic Hollywood effort in which he starred. During the visit Tánaiste and Minister for Foreign Affairs Eamon Gilmore greeted Cruise and presented him with a "certificate of Irish heritage" - Cruise also undertook the now traditional Guinness factory tour for visiting dignitaries and was photographed grinning with pint in hand. During his appearance on The Late Late Show he claimed to be "at home" in Ireland and put on a mock Irish accent for the easily amused host, who revealed that he had unearthed family links to the Cruises—links which must not be taken at face value as the host has previously claimed to be connected to everyone from Éamon de Valera to King John and Edward III. Cruise then gushed about his experience elsewhere, calling it "incredible [...] a gift [...] they went and researched my family [...] an amazing story [...] They gave me a cert saying this [...] traced my family back to the ninth century [...] no idea it went back that far. You couldn't make this stuff up - I found out my ancestors owned a town called Hollywood. It's wild. One guy was a famine hero."

== Thirty-third episode ==
After Charlene McKenna appeared on the show on 26 April 2013, she said her mother was mortified at having had the camera aimed directly at her.

== Ryan's daughter ==
On 10 May 2013, a daughter of Gerry Ryan performed on the show and had a chat with presenter Ryan Tubridy. Another daughter made known her excitement at the appearance.

== Thirty-seventh episode ==
On 24 May 2013, Jim Bartley had a full segment of The Late Late Show set aside in honour of his 55 years in showbiz. His former Fair City co-star and screen wife Jean Costello was sitting in the audience and was reported to be "disgusted" that she was snubbed. Costello was also reported to have been offended at an off-the-cuff remark about a "bereavement" suffered following the death of Costello's character, without mentioning her character's name.

== Thirty-eight episode ==
The final show of the season was broadcast on 31 May 2013. Guests included West End and Broadway star Colm Wilkinson, Nile Rodgers of Chic and Mark Owen of Take That. Ahead of the broadcast a video mash of The Late Late Show versus The Graham Norton Show had nearly 100,000 hits.

== Special editions ==
The season's edition of The Late Late Toy Show was broadcast on 30 November 2012. It had a Shrek theme (though a trailer airing all week in advance falsely implied an Indiana Jones theme), took place on 30 November. It was host Ryan Tubridy's fourth Toy Show. As showtime approached there was much talk of "reasonably priced toys" and the host's choice of jumper—"There won't be any penguins or snowmen or figures on the jumper. I would describe this sweater as gruesome, nasty and grotesque, but only from a sartorial point of view." [Tubridy "joke"] There was also a scam involving fake tickets. The children appearing included eight Irish dancers known as Damhsa Juniors and two kids from Naas performing English pop singer's Jessie J's song "Price Tag", with a group singing "Santa Claus Is Coming to Town" as the show finale. Other features to look forward to included a special appearance by The X Factor finalists Union J, Aston and Kayleigh from RTÉ documentary Apartment Kids championing toys for small spaces, a remote-controlled James Bond car and a PlayStation game written by J. K. Rowling. The highlight moment of the show happened when young Alex Meehan on a peddle powered tractor came out before spontaneously speaking Irish to Ryan Tubridy. When Tubridy responded by asking him if he had "any craic" Alex answered "Níl" before peddling off the stage.

The 2013 Eurosong Final was held on The Late Late Show on 22 February. Five acts performed, with one selected to represent Ireland at Eurovision Song Contest 2013 in Malmö. The winner of the national song contest was Ryan Dolan with the song "Only Love Survives".

== Episode list ==
No.	Original release date	Guest(s)	Musical/entertainment guest(s)
1	7 September 2012	TBA	TBA
2	14 September 2012	TBA	TBA
3	21 September 2012	TBA	TBA
4	28 September 2012	TBA	TBA
5	5 October 2012	TBA	TBA
6	12 October 2012	TBA	TBA
7	19 October 2012	TBA	TBA
8	26 October 2012	TBA	TBA
9	2 November 2012	TBA	TBA
10	9 November 2012	TBA	TBA
11	16 November 2012	TBA	TBA
12	23 November 2012	TBA	TBA
13	30 November 2012	TBA	TBA
14	7 December 2012	TBA	TBA
15	14 December 2012	TBA	TBA
16	21 December 2012	TBA	TBA
17	4 January 2013	TBA	TBA
18	11 January 2013	TBA	TBA
19	18 January 2013	TBA	TBA
20	25 January 2013	TBA	TBA
21	1 February 2013	TBA	TBA
22	8 February 2013	TBA	TBA
23	15 February 2013	TBA	TBA
24	22 February 2013	TBA	TBA
25	1 March 2013	TBA	TBA
26	8 March 2013	TBA	TBA
27	15 March 2013	TBA	TBA
28	22 March 2013	TBA	TBA
29	29 March 2013	TBA	TBA
30	5 April 2013	TBA	TBA
31	12 April 2013	TBA	TBA
32	19 April 2013	TBA	TBA
33	26 April 2013	TBA	TBA
34	3 May 2013	TBA	TBA
35	10 May 2013	TBA	TBA
36	17 May 2013	TBA	TBA
37	24 May 2013	TBA	TBA
38	31 May 2013	TBA	TBA
