= Czech Republic in the Eurovision Song Contest 2022 =

- Eurovision Song Contest 2022
- Participating broadcaster: Czech Television (ČT)
- Country: Czech Republic
- Selection process: ESCZ 2022
- Selection date: 16 December 2021

Competing entry
- Song: "Lights Off"
- Artist: We Are Domi
- Songwriters: Einar Eriksen Kvaløy; Abi F Jones; Dominika Hašková; Casper Hatlestad; Benjamin Rekstad

Placement
- Semi-final result: Qualified (4th, 227 points)
- Final result: 22nd, 38 points

Participation chronology

The Czech Republic was represented at the Eurovision Song Contest 2022 with the song "Lights Off", written by Einar Eriksen Kvaløy, Abi F Jones, Dominika Hašková, Casper Hatlestad, and Benjamin Rekstad, and performed by the latter three as the band We Are Domi. The Czech broadcaster Česká televize (ČT) organised the national final ESCZ 2022 in order to select the Czech entry for the 2022 contest. Seven entries competed in the national final and "Lights Off" performed by We Are Domi was announced as the winner on 16 December 2021 following the combination of votes from a twelve-member international jury panel, an international public vote and a Czech public vote.

Czech Republic was drawn to compete in the second semi-final of the Eurovision Song Contest which took place on 12 May 2022. Performing as the closing entry during the show in position 18, "Lights Off" was announced among the top 10 entries of the second semi-final and therefore qualified to compete in the final on 14 May. It was later revealed that Czech Republic placed fourth out of the 18 participating countries in the semi-final with 227 points. In the final, Czech Republic performed in position 1 and placed twenty-second out of the 25 participating countries, scoring 38 points.

== Background ==
Prior to the 2022 contest, Czech Republic has participated in the Eurovision Song Contest nine times since its first entry in 2007. The nation competed in the contest on three consecutive occasions between 2007 and 2009 without qualifying to the final. After Gipsy.cz performing the song "Aven Romale" placed 18th (last) in their semi-final failing to score any points in 2009, the Czech broadcaster withdrew from the contest between 2010 and 2014 citing reasons such as low viewing figures and poor results for their absence. Since returning to the contest in 2015 and qualifying to the final for the first time in 2016, Czech Republic has featured in three finals. In 2021, the country failed to qualify to the final with the song "Omaga" performed by Benny Cristo.

The Czech national broadcaster, Česká televize (ČT) broadcasts the event within Czech Republic and organises the selection process for the nation's entry. The broadcaster has used both national finals and internal selections to select the Czech Eurovision entry in the past. ČT confirmed their intentions to participate at the 2022 Eurovision Song Contest in September 2021. The broadcaster later confirmed in October 2021 that the Czech entry for the 2022 contest would be selected through a national final.

== Before Eurovision ==
=== ESCZ 2022 ===
ESCZ 2022 was the national final organised by ČT in order to select the Czech entry for the Eurovision Song Contest 2022. Seven entries participated in the competition which took place online between 7 and 15 December 2021, with the winner being selected via a jury and public vote and announced on 16 December 2021.

==== Competing entries ====
Artists and composers were able to submit their proposals to the broadcaster between 16 September 2021 and 30 September 2021. Artists were required to have Czech citizenship and for groups of a maximum of six members, at least one of the lead vocalists were required to have Czech citizenship. Songwriters of any nationality were able to submit songs. The broadcaster received over 150 submissions at the closing of the deadline. ČT selected seven entries for the national final from the submissions received, which were presented to the public during a press conference on 6 December 2021.

==== Final ====
Seven entries competed in the national final and the winner was determined by the combination of votes from a twelve-member international jury panel (50%), an international public vote (25%) and a Czech public vote (25%). The international jury consisted of former Eurovision entrants, while both international and Czech users were able to vote via the official Eurovision Song Contest application between 7 and 15 December 2021. The winner, "Lights Off" performed by We Are Domi, was announced on 16 December 2021.

The international jury panel consisted of:

- Victor Crone – represented Estonia in 2019
- Tix – represented Norway in 2021
- Maraaya – represented Slovenia in 2015
- The Black Mamba – represented Portugal in 2021
- Manizha – represented Russia in 2021
- Blind Channel – represented Finland in 2021
- Go_A – represented Ukraine in 2021
- Daði Freyr – represented Iceland in 2021
- Gjon's Tears – represented Switzerland in 2021
- Jay Aston – represented the United Kingdom in 1981 as part of Bucks Fizz
- Paul Harrington - represented Ireland in 1994 (with Charlie McGettigan)
- Charlie McGettigan - represented Ireland in 1994 (with Paul Harrington)

Artist	Song	Songwriter(s)	Jury	Public		Total	Place
Artist	Song	Songwriter(s)	Jury	Intl.	Czech	Total	Place
Annabelle	"Runnin' Out of F* Time"	Annabelle; Marcel Procházka; Ondrej Fiedler; Tom Oehler	8	1.5	1.5	11	6
Elis Mraz	"Imma Be"	Elis Mraz	10	2	5	17	2
Giudi	"Jezinky"	Amelie Siba; Jitka Martiriggiano; Joshua Banwell	6	5	4	15	3
Jordan Haj and Emma Smetana	"By Now"	Jordan Haj	3	3	6	12	4
Skywalker	"Way Down"	Damian Kucera; David Machalický; Jan Kucera; Lucas Woodland; Tomáš Rothschedl	6	4	2	12	5
The Valentines	"Stay or Go"	Jan Doležal	4	1	1	6	7
We Are Domi	"Lights Off"	Einar Eriksen Kvaløy; Abi F Jones; Dominika Hašková; Casper Hatlestad; Benjamin Rekstad	12	6	3	21	1

Detailed International Jury Votes
Song	Victor Crone	Tix	Maraaya	The Black Mamba	Manizha	Blind Channel	Go_A	Daði Freyr	Gjon’s Tears	Jay Aston	Paul Harrington	Charlie McGettigan	Total	Points
Song	Estonia	Norway	Slovenia	Portugal	Russia	Finland	Ukraine	Iceland	Switzerland	United Kingdom	Ireland	Ireland	Total	Points
"Runnin' Out of F* Time"	6	2	10	8	3	6	10	3	8	12	12	4	84	8
"Imma Be"	8	10	12	6	12	10	4	4	6	8	6	6	92	10
"Jezinky"	2	8	2	3	4	12	6	10	10	2	8	2	69	6
"By Now”	4	6	3	4	6	2	2	2	2	6	4	8	49	3
"Way Down"	3	3	8	10	8	8	8	8	4	4	2	3	69	6
"Stay or Go"	10	4	6	2	2	3	3	6	3	3	3	12	57	4
"Lights Off"	12	12	4	12	10	4	12	12	12	10	10	10	120	12

== At Eurovision ==
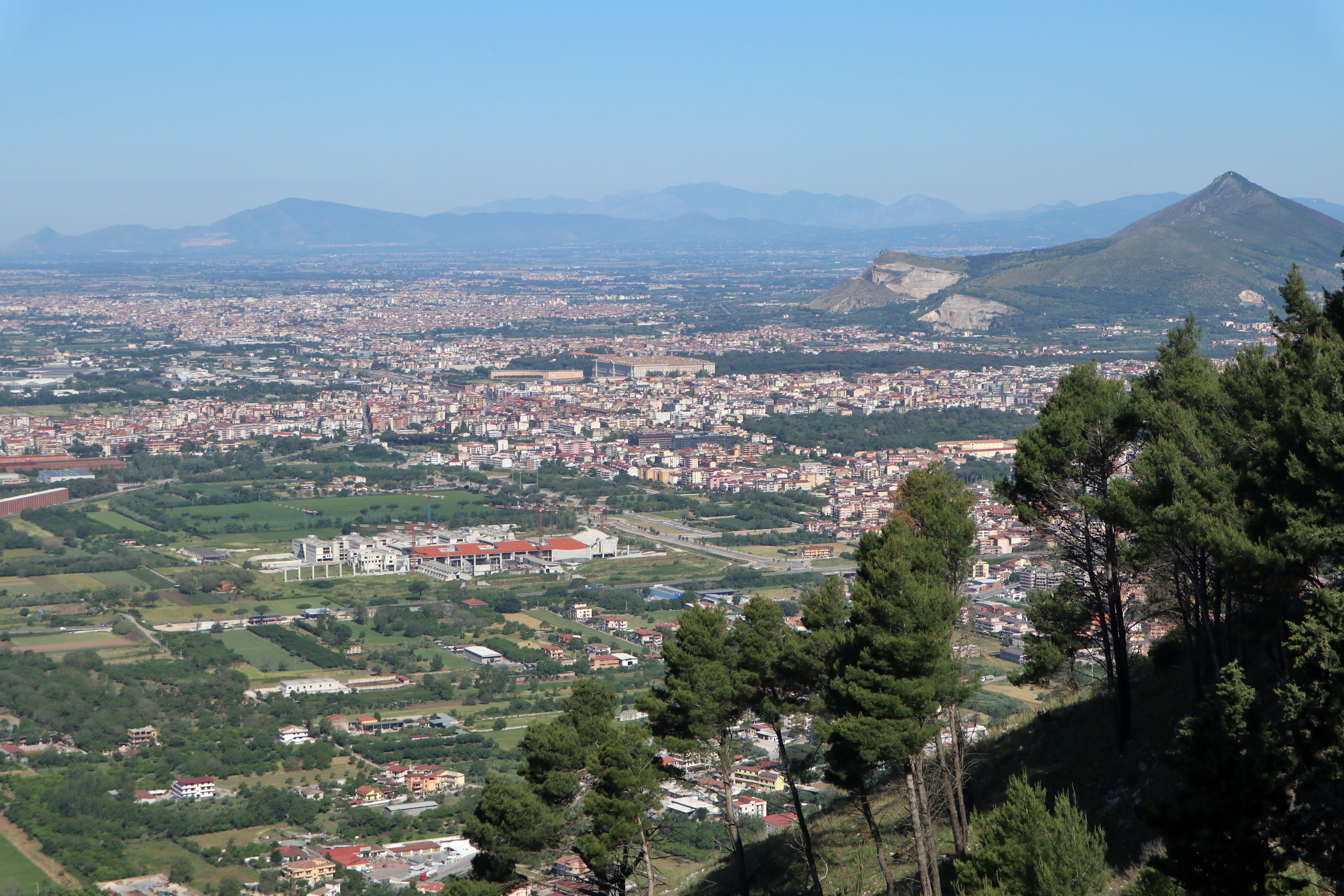
A video postcard introduced the Czech performance in the second semi-final and final of the Eurovision Song Contest 2022. The postcard was filmed in Caserta in Campania and featured virtual projections of the band across the location.

According to Eurovision rules, all nations with the exceptions of the host country and the "Big Five" (France, Germany, Italy, Spain and the United Kingdom) are required to qualify from one of two semi-finals in order to compete for the final; the top ten countries from each semi-final progress to the final. The European Broadcasting Union (EBU) split up the competing countries into six different pots based on voting patterns from previous contests, with countries with favourable voting histories put into the same pot. On 25 January 2022, an allocation draw was held which placed each country into one of the two semi-finals, as well as which half of the show they would perform in. The Czech Republic was placed into the second semi-final, held on 12 May 2022, and was scheduled to perform in the second half of the show.

Once all the competing songs for the 2022 contest had been released, the running order for the semi-finals was decided by the shows' producers rather than through another draw, so that similar songs were not placed next to each other. The Czech Republic was set to perform last in position 18, following the entry from Sweden.

All shows were broadcast in the Czech Republic on ČT2 and featured commentary by Jan Maxián. The Czech spokesperson, who announced the top 12-point score awarded by the Czech jury during the final, was Taťána Kuchařová.

=== Semi-final ===
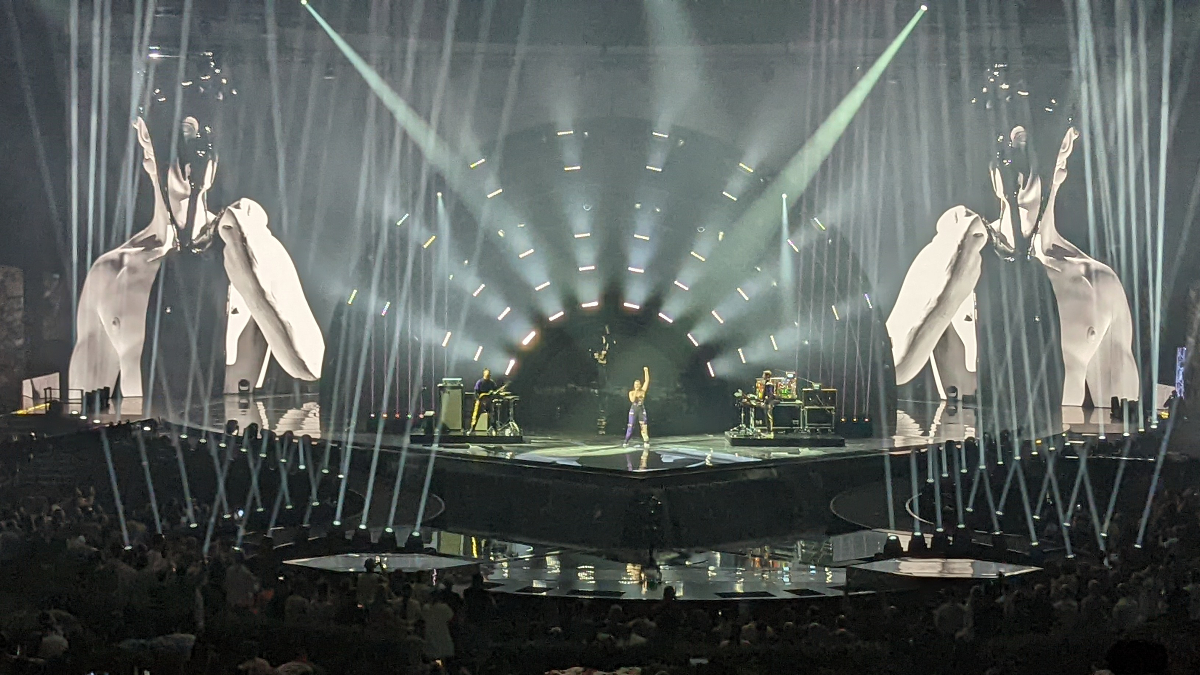
We Are Domi during the second semi-final

We Are Domi took part in technical rehearsals on 3 and 6 May, followed by dress rehearsals on 11 and 12 May. This included the jury show on 11 May where the professional juries of each country watched and voted on the competing entries.

The Czech performance featured the members of We Are Domi appearing on stage wearing dark outfits: Dominika Hasek, located at the centre of the stage, in a strapless purple jumpsuit with yellow and cream accents, and Casper Hatlestad and Benjamin Rekstad, both of them on each side of her in DJ set-ups, in dystopian overalls. During the performance, the stage briefly went into darkness after the "so turn the lights off" refrain was sung. The LED screens displayed statues of David of Michelangelo, accompanied by pulsating silver lights around the arena. The art director for the performance was Matyáš Vorda, and the stage director was Vítek Bělohradský. An off-stage backing vocalist, Nikol Držmíšková, performed with We Are Domi.

At the end of the show, Czech Republic was announced as having finished in the top 10 and subsequently qualifying for the grand final. It was later revealed that the Czech Republic placed fourth in the semi-final, receiving a total of 227 points: 125 points from the televoting and 102 points from the juries.

=== Final ===
Shortly after the second semi-final, a winners' press conference was held for the ten qualifying countries. As part of this press conference, the qualifying artists took part in a draw to determine which half of the grand final they would subsequently participate in. This draw was done in the order the countries appeared in the semi-final running order. Czech Republic was drawn to compete in the first half. Following this draw, the shows' producers decided upon the running order of the final, as they had done for the semi-finals. Czech Republic was subsequently placed to perform in position 1, before the entry from Romania.

We Are Domi once again took part in dress rehearsals on 13 and 14 May before the final, including the jury final where the professional juries cast their final votes before the live show. The band performed a repeat of their semi-final performance during the final on 14 May. Czech Republic placed twenty-second in the final, scoring 38 points: 5 points from the televoting and 33 points from the juries.

=== Voting ===
Voting during the three shows involved each country awarding two sets of points from 1–8, 10 and 12: one from their professional jury and the other from televoting. Each nation's jury consisted of five music industry professionals who are citizens of the country they represent. This jury judged each entry based on: vocal capacity; the stage performance; the song's composition and originality; and the overall impression by the act. In addition, each member of a national jury may only take part in the panel once every three years, and no jury was permitted to discuss of their vote with other members or be related in any way to any of the competing acts in such a way that they cannot vote impartially and independently. The individual rankings of each jury member in an anonymised form as well as the nation's televoting results were released shortly after the grand final.

Below is a breakdown of points awarded to the Czech Republic and awarded by the Czech Republic in the second semi-final and grand final of the contest, and the breakdown of the jury voting and televoting conducted during the two shows:

==== Points awarded to the Czech Republic ====
Points awarded to the Czech Republic (Semi-final 2)
Score	Televote	Jury
12 points		
10 points	Israel; Spain	Ireland; United Kingdom
8 points	Estonia; Ireland; Poland; United Kingdom	Poland; Romania
7 points	Australia; Finland; Serbia	Estonia; Malta
6 points	Germany; North Macedonia; Romania; San Marino; Sweden	Azerbaijan; Georgia; Finland; Israel; San Marino; Sweden
5 points	Belgium; Cyprus	
4 points	Georgia; Montenegro	Belgium; Cyprus; Serbia
3 points		
2 points	Azerbaijan; Malta	Australia; Montenegro
1 point		

Points awarded to the Czech Republic (Final)
Score	Televote	Jury
12 points		
10 points		
8 points		
7 points		Ireland
6 points		
5 points	North Macedonia	Sweden
4 points		Australia
3 points		Malta; Serbia
2 points		Belgium; Greece; France; Iceland; Israel
1 point		Ukraine

==== Points awarded by the Czech Republic ====
Points awarded by the Czech Republic (Semi-final 2)
Score	Televote	Jury
12 points	Serbia	Sweden
10 points	Finland	North Macedonia
8 points	Estonia	Australia
7 points	Poland	Estonia
6 points	Sweden	Belgium
5 points	Australia	Georgia
4 points	Romania	Azerbaijan
3 points	Israel	Poland
2 points	North Macedonia	Finland
1 point	Ireland	Malta

Points awarded by the Czech Republic (Final)
Score	Televote	Jury
12 points	Ukraine	United Kingdom
10 points	Serbia	Sweden
8 points	Moldova	Estonia
7 points	Poland	Spain
6 points	Spain	Switzerland
5 points	Sweden	Portugal
4 points	Estonia	Ukraine
3 points	Norway	Greece
2 points	United Kingdom	Norway
1 point	Finland	Australia

==== Detailed voting results ====
The following members comprised the Czech jury:

- Annabelle – singer, participated in Eurovision Song CZ 2022
- Jan Vávra – producer, broadcaster
- Marcell – singer-songwriter, performer
- Marta Říhová – musician, singer
- Ondra Fiedler – songwriter, producer

Detailed voting results from the Czech Republic (Semi-final 2)
R/O	Country	Jury							Televote	
R/O	Country	Juror 1	Juror 2	Juror 3	Juror 4	Juror 5	Rank	Points	Rank	Points
01	Finland	16	10	12	10	3	9	2	2	10
02	Israel	15	9	9	12	12	12		8	3
03	Serbia	14	16	14	14	11	14		1	12
04	Azerbaijan	4	8	7	8	10	7	4	15	
05	Georgia	5	7	6	6	9	6	5	11	
06	Malta	10	11	11	11	5	10	1	14	
07	San Marino	17	17	15	17	13	17		16	
08	Australia	6	3	5	3	2	3	8	6	5
09	Cyprus	11	15	10	16	15	13		12	
10	Ireland	7	13	13	9	14	11		10	1
11	North Macedonia	2	2	2	2	4	2	10	9	2
12	Estonia	3	4	3	4	6	4	7	3	8
13	Romania	13	14	16	15	17	16		7	4
14	Poland	9	5	8	7	8	8	3	4	7
15	Montenegro	12	12	17	13	16	15		17	
16	Belgium	8	6	4	5	7	5	6	13	
17	Sweden	1	1	1	1	1	1	12	5	6
18	Czech Republic									

Detailed voting results from the Czech Republic (Final)
R/O	Country	Jury							Televote	
R/O	Country	Juror 1	Juror 2	Juror 3	Juror 4	Juror 5	Rank	Points	Rank	Points
01	Czech Republic									
02	Romania	21	20	23	21	21	22		21	
03	Portugal	6	4	3	6	16	6	5	20	
04	Finland	23	21	19	17	10	18		10	1
05	Switzerland	4	3	8	4	12	5	6	24	
06	France	22	23	22	19	23	23		14	
07	Norway	20	16	11	3	9	9	2	8	3
08	Armenia	15	15	9	12	15	15		11	
09	Italy	11	12	15	10	18	14		15	
10	Spain	5	7	5	7	3	4	7	5	6
11	Netherlands	8	10	13	11	14	11		12	
12	Ukraine	7	9	4	8	8	7	4	1	12
13	Germany	12	18	12	20	13	16		17	
14	Lithuania	19	19	21	24	19	21		13	
15	Azerbaijan	14	14	18	16	5	12		18	
16	Belgium	10	8	10	15	20	13		22	
17	Greece	9	11	7	5	7	8	3	19	
18	Iceland	18	17	17	22	22	20		23	
19	Moldova	24	24	24	23	24	24		3	8
20	Sweden	2	1	2	2	1	2	10	6	5
21	Australia	13	6	14	14	6	10	1	16	
22	United Kingdom	1	2	1	1	2	1	12	9	2
23	Poland	17	13	16	13	17	17		4	7
24	Serbia	16	22	20	18	11	19		2	10
25	Estonia	3	5	6	9	4	3	8	7	4
