= Brooke Scullion =

Irish singer (born 1999)

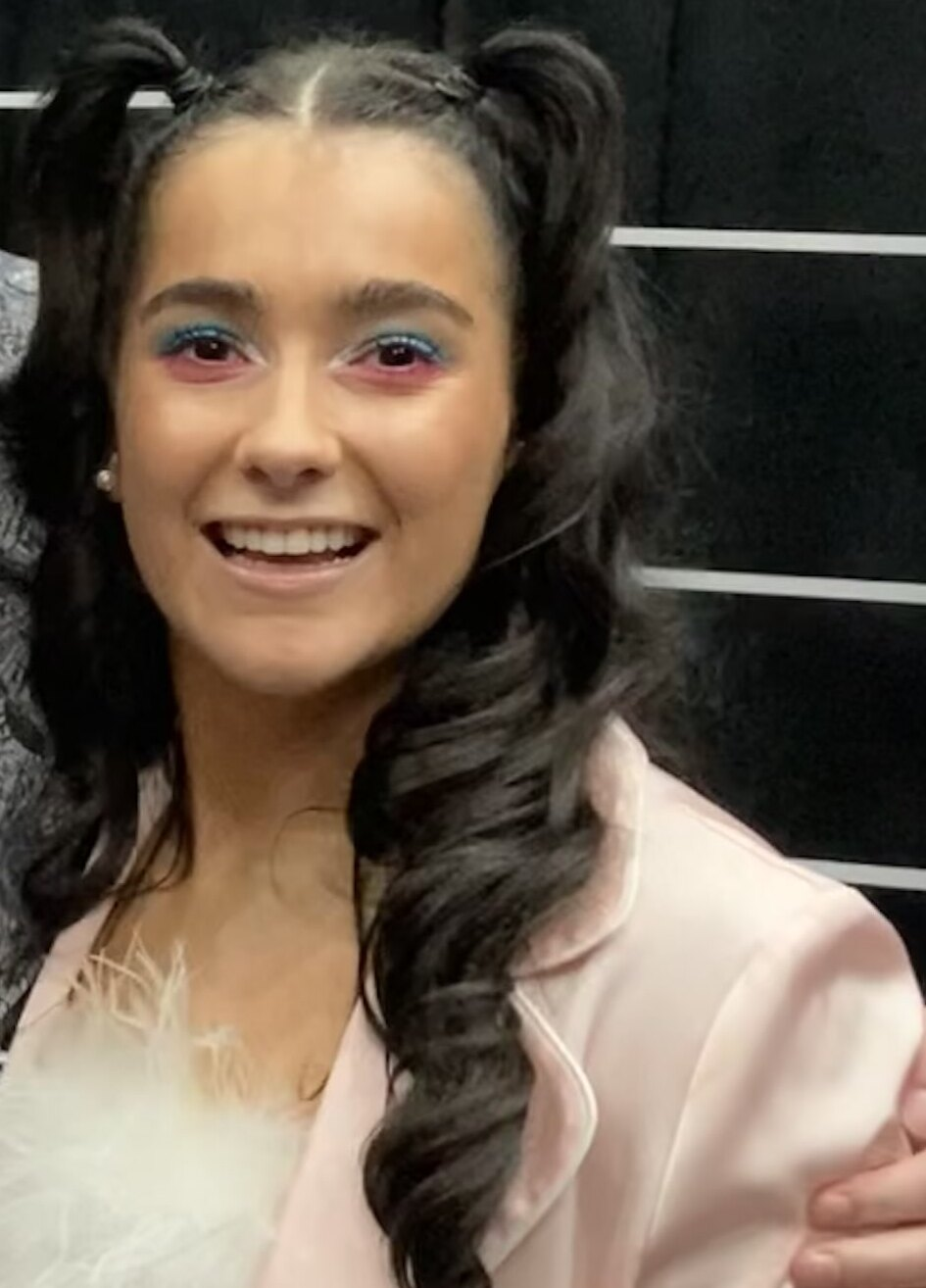
- Scullion in 2022

Background information
- Born: 31 March 1999 (age 27); Bellaghy, County Londonderry, Northern Ireland
- Genre: Pop
- Occupation: Singer
- Years active: 2019–present

Brooke Scullion, known professionally as Brooke, is a singer from Northern Ireland. She was a contestant on series 9 of The Voice UK, finishing in third place. She represented Ireland in the Eurovision Song Contest 2022 with the song "That's Rich".

== Early life ==
Scullion was born on 31 March 1999 in Bellaghy, County Londonderry, Northern Ireland. She was involved in both the performing arts and sports from a young age. In secondary school, she performed in several musical productions including Fame, Mamma Mia!, and Sister Act. She played on the senior camogie team at Wolfe Tones GAC.

She was a drama student at Ulster University at Magee.

== Career ==
=== The Voice UK ===
In 2020, she auditioned for the ninth series of The Voice UK. In the blind auditions, she earned chair turns from all four coaches and chose Meghan Trainor to be her coach. She finished in third place.

The Voice UK performances
	Song	Original artist(s)	Notes
Blind Audition	"Bruises"	Lewis Capaldi	Four-chair turn, joined Team Meghan
Battle	"Water Under the Bridge"	Adele	Won against Jordan Phillips
Knockout	"Stay"	Rihanna feat. Mikky Ekko	Won against Beryl McCormack and Oli Ross
Semi-final	"Nothing Breaks Like a Heart"	Mark Ronson feat. Miley Cyrus	Advanced to the final
Final	"Edge of Seventeen"	Stevie Nicks	
Final	"Giant"	Calvin Harris and Rag'n'Bone Man	Duet with Ella Eyre

=== Eurovision Song Contest 2022 ===
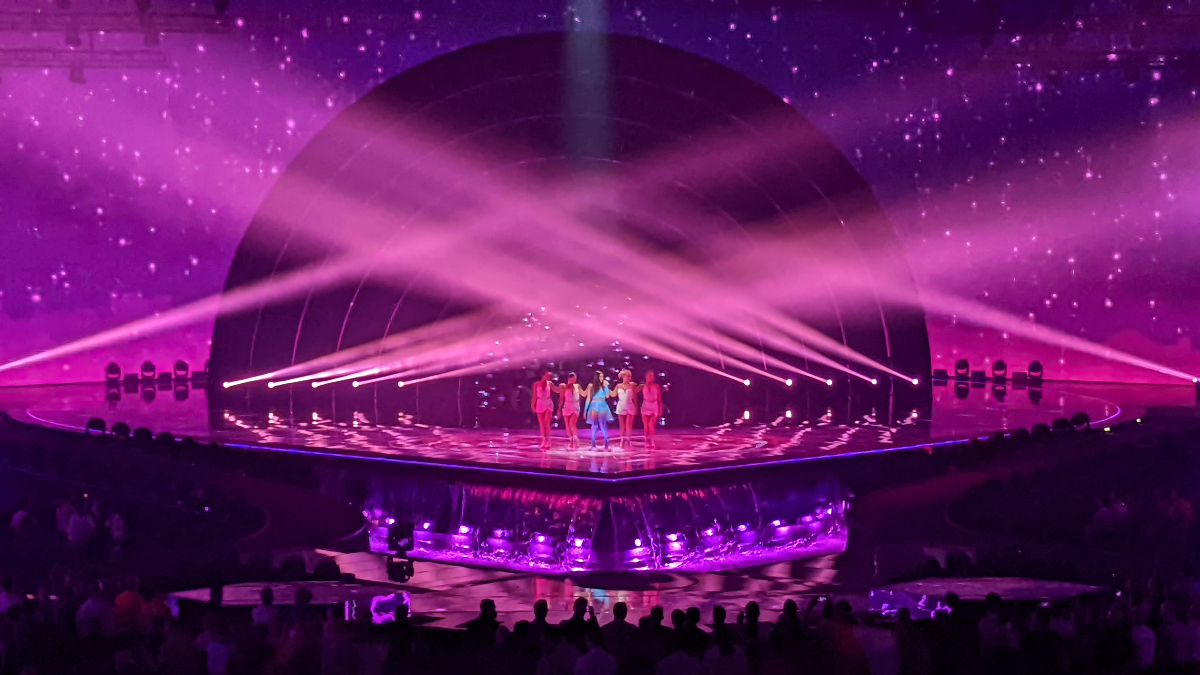
Scullion performing at the Eurovision Song Contest 2022

In January 2022, Brooke was announced as one of six finalists competing in Eurosong 2022, the national final for Ireland to decide its representative for the Eurovision Song Contest 2022. With her song "That's Rich", Brooke won Eurosong 2022 with twenty-eight points. She won by four points over "Ashes of Yesterday" by Janet Grogan and "Yeah, We're Gonna Get Out of It" by Miles Graham. She received twelve points each from the international jury and televote, and four points from the jury in the studio. She represented Ireland in the Eurovision Song Contest 2022 in Turin, Italy and performed in position 10 in the second semi-final on 12 May. However, Scullion failed to qualify for the final.

=== Dancing with the Stars ===
From January to March 2023, Scullion was a contestant in the sixth series of Dancing with the Stars. She was originally partnered with Maurizio Benenato, however, in week 3, Benenato had to leave the show citing personal reasons. Scullion's partner since then was Robert Rowiński. She received 25 points in week one, a record score for week one of the show. In week 8 of the competition, she received the first 30 of the series. Scullion and Rowiński eventually reached the final, finishing as joint runners-up to Carl Mullan and Emily Barker.

== Personal life ==
Outside of singing, Brooke works as a personal assistant to an estate agent in Toome, County Antrim.

== Discography ==
=== Extended plays ===
Title	Details
Chaotic Heart	Released: 30 September 2022; Label: V2 Records; Formats: Digital download, streaming

=== Singles ===
==== As lead artist ====
Title	Year	Peak chart positions	Album or EP
Title	Year	IRE	Album or EP
"Attention"	2020	—	Chaotic Heart
"That's Rich"	2022	54	Chaotic Heart
"Tongues"	2022	—	Chaotic Heart
"Heartbreaker"	2022	—	Chaotic Heart
"Come Alive"	2023	—	Non-album singles
"Being Alone"	2023	—	Non-album singles
"Overload"	2023	—	Non-album singles
"Love Bomb"	2024	—	Non-album singles
"Proximity"	2025	—	Non-album singles
"—" denotes a recording that did not chart or was not released in that territory.

==== As featured artist ====
Title	Year	Album or EP
"My Design" (Noise Network featuring Brooke)	2025	Press Rewind

Awards and achievements
Preceded by Lesley Roy with "Maps"	Ireland in the Eurovision Song Contest; 2022	Succeeded by Wild Youth with "We Are One"
