= Wild Youth (band) =

Irish indie pop band

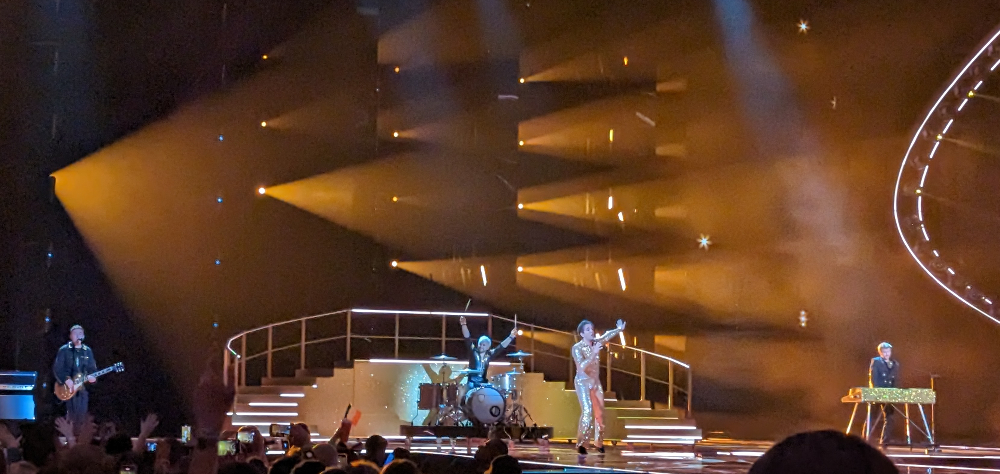
- Wild Youth at Eurovision 2023

Background information
- Origin: Dublin, Ireland
- Genres: pop rock, pop, alternative rock
- Years active: 2016–present
- Members: David Whelan; Conor O'Donohoe; Ed Porter; Callum McAdam

Wild Youth are an Irish pop band formed in Dublin in 2016, consisting of members David Whelan, Conor O'Donohoe, Ed Porter and Callum McAdam. They represented Ireland in the Eurovision Song Contest 2023 with the song "We Are One".

== Career ==
Conor O'Donohoe and David Whelan have been friends since childhood, and recorded covers together before the band's formation, having started making music after O'Donohoe suffered an accident which left him bedridden for several months. The duo founded Wild Youth alongside drummer Callum McAdam (formerly of Bipolar Empire) and guitarist Edward Porter (formerly of Leaders of Men) in 2016 in Dublin.

The members write and produce their songs alone. Their debut single, "All or Nothing", was released in May 2017, with a music video following on 22 June. A number of tracks were released after it, which became hits in Ireland. Following its success, the band opened for Niall Horan, Lewis Capaldi and Westlife. In 2019, their first mini-album, The Last Goodbye, was released. The Last Goodbye debuted at number five on the Irish Albums Chart.

On 9 January 2023, Wild Youth were announced as a competitor in Eurosong 2023, Ireland's national final for the Eurovision Song Contest 2023, with their song "We Are One". At the national final, they won both the national jury voting and the televote, earning the right to represent Ireland. In the run-up to the contest, the band cut ties with their creative director Ian Banham following the emergence of transphobic, anti-vaccine and xenophobic comments he had made on Twitter. Lead singer Conor O'Donohoe posted that he "felt sick" reading the comments, and in a statement, the band stated that "Wild Youth is a band that stands for unity and kindness", and that Banham would not be "on or near [their] team" for Eurovision. At Eurovision, they participated in the first semi-final on 9 May 2023, failing to qualify for the final.

On 6 August 2023 the band was accused of performing while intoxicated at a carnival event in Ballygar. The carnival organisers released a statement on 8 August in support of the band.

In December 2023, band member David Whelan was announced as one of the eleven celebrities taking part in the seventh season of Dancing with the Stars.

== Band members ==
- David Whelan – vocals, guitars
- Ed Porter – guitars, vocals
- Conor O'Donohoe – keyboards, piano, vocals
- Callum McAdam – drums

== Discography ==
=== Extended plays ===
List of extended plays, with selected details
| Title | EP details | Peak chart positions |
| Title | EP details | IRE |
|---|---|---|
| The Last Goodbye – EP | Released: January 25, 2019; Format: CD, digital download, streaming; Label: Imperfectly Perfect Records | 5 |
| Forever Girl | Released: March 26, 2021; Format: Digital download, streaming; Label: Imperfectly Perfect Records | — |

=== Singles ===
List of singles, with selected chart positions
| Title | Year | Peak chart positions | Album or EP |
| Title | Year | IRE | Album or EP |
|---|---|---|---|
| "Can't Move On" | 2018 | 59 | The Last Goodbye |
| "Making Me Dance" | 2019 | 73 | The Last Goodbye |
| "Next to You" | 2020 | — | Forever Girl |
| "Through the Phone" | 2020 | — | Forever Girl |
| "Champagne Butterflies" | 2021 | — | Forever Girl |
| "Can't Say No" | 2021 | — | Forever Girl |
| "Seventeen" | 2022 | — | Non-album singles |
| "Live Without You" | 2022 | — | Non-album singles |
| "We Are One" | 2023 | 93 | Non-album singles |
| "All Again for You" | 2023 | — | Non-album singles |
| "Close" | 2024 | — | The Last Goodbye |
| "Long Time No See" | 2024 | — | Non-album singles |
| "Lose Control" | 2024 | — | Non-album singles |
| "All or Nothing" | 2024 | — | Non-album singles |
"—" denotes a recording that did not chart or was not released in that territory.

Awards and achievements
| Preceded by Brooke Scullion with "That's Rich" | Ireland in the Eurovision Song Contest; 2023 | Succeeded by Bambie Thug with "Doomsday Blue" |
