= Česko Slovensko má talent season 1 =

Česko Slovensko má talent
- Season 1
- Hosted by: Martin "Pyco" Rausch; Jakub Prachař
- Judges: Jan Kraus; Lucie Bílá; Jaro Slávik
- Winner: DeaMan
- Runner-up: Richard Nedvěd

Release
- Original network: Prima; TV JOJ
- Original release: 29 August – 28 November 2010

The first series of Česko Slovensko má talent began on 29 August 2010 and ended on 28 November 2010. It was won by Acrobalance duo DeaMan. The first five shows concerned the audition stages of the competition and the final eight shows aired the live semi-finals and final. The show was hosted by Martin "Pyco" Rasuch and Jakub Prachař. The judges were Jan Kraus, Lucie Bílá and Jaro Slávik.

== Castings ==
Producers castings

City	Date	Place
Bratislava, Slovakia	May 29, 2010	Palace Cinemas EUROVEA
Plzeň, Czech Republic	June 6, 2010	Hotel Central
Brno, Czech Republic	June 13, 2010	Hotel Continental
Žilina, Slovakia	June 18, 2010	Hotel Holiday Inn
Ostrava, Czech Republic	June 20, 2010	Hotel Imperial
Košice, Slovakia	June 25, 2010	Hotel Hilton
Prague, Czech Republic	June 27, 2010	Hotel Corinthia

Jury castings

City	Date	Place
Prague, Czech Republic	5–6 August 2010	National Theatre
Brno, Czech Republic	10–12 August 2010	Mahen Theatre
Bratislava, Slovakia	15–16 August 2010	Slovak National Theatre

Czech Republic	Judges Casting

Slovakia	Judges Casting

== Semi-final summary ==
The "Order" columns lists the order of appearance each act made for every episode.

Key	X Buzzed out	✔ Judges' choice	Won the public vote	Won the judges' vote

=== Semi-final 1 ===
Order	Finished	Artist	Act	Country	Buzzes and judges' choices		
Order	Finished	Artist	Act	Country	Jan	Lucie	Jaro
1	-	Pyroterra	Fireshow	Czech Republic	—	—	—
2	-	Zuzana Gamboová	Singer	Czech Republic	—	—	—
3	3rd (lost judges' vote)	Brejk Denz Bradrz	Break dance Parodie	Czech Republic	—	✔	X
4	-	Lilianka Olahová	Singer	Slovakia	—	—	—
5	-	Aleš Rozsýval	Illusionist	Czech Republic	—	—	X
6	1st (won public vote)	mako!mako	Vocal Group	Czech Republic and Slovakia			
7	-	Julia Maria Sakar	Singer	Switzerland	—	—	—
8	2nd (won judges' vote)	Chebejet	Acrobatic Group	Czech Republic	✔		✔

=== Semi-final 2 ===
Order	Finished	Artist	Act	Country	Buzzes and judges' choices		
Order	Finished	Artist	Act	Country	Jan	Lucie	Jaro
1	3rd (lost judges' vote)	Beethoven DC	Dance group	Czech Republic	—	—	✔
2	2nd (won judges' vote)	Radek Bakalář	Illusionist	Czech Republic	✔	✔	
3	-	ChiChi Tornádo	Travesty show	Czech Republic	—	—	—
4	-	Lenka Piešová	Singer	Slovakia	—	—	—
5	-	Out of Bounds	Dance group	Czech Republic and Brazil	—	—	—
6	-	Metal Kidz	Band	Czech Republic	—	—	—
7	-	Dominika Kormaňak	Pole dance	Slovakia	—	—	—
8	1st (won public vote)	Marián Zázrivý	Opera singer	Slovakia			

=== Semi-final 3 ===
Order	Finished	Artist	Act	Country	Buzzes and judges' choices		
Order	Finished	Artist	Act	Country	Jan	Lucie	Jaro
1	1st (won public vote)	The Pastels	Dance group	Slovakia			
2	-	Patrik Battya	Singer	Slovakia	—	—	—
3	-	Sleeperz	Yo-yo	Czech Republic	—	—	—
4	-	Sweet Zone	Punk rock band	Czech Republic	—	—	—
5	-	Daniel Borak	Tap dance	Switzerland	—	—	—
6	-	Gabriel Rábek	Belly dance	Slovakia	—	—	—
7	3rd (lost judges' vote)	Screamers	Travesty show	Czech Republic	—	—	—
8	2nd (won judges' vote)	Dominika Hašková	Singer	Czech Republic	✔	✔	✔

=== Semi-final 4 ===
Order	Finished	Artist	Act	Country	Buzzes and judges' choices		
Order	Finished	Artist	Act	Country	Jan	Lucie	Jaro
1	-	Magdaléna Lippke	Singer	Slovakia	—	—	X
2	2nd (won judges' vote)	Křečkovi muži	Dance group	Czech Republic	✔	✔	
3	-	Anton Toráč	Singer	Slovakia	—	—	X
4	3rd (lost judges' vote)	Lucie Smolíková and Angel	Dog dancing	Czech Republic	—	—	✔
5	-	Zuzana Saparová and JazzBand	Singer	Czech Republic	—	—	—
6	-	TS Salut Roma	Dance group	Czech Republic	—	—	—
7	-	Long Vehicle Circus	Dance on stilts	Czech Republic	—	—	—
8	1st (won public vote)	Katarína and Zuzana Winklerová	Singers	Slovakia			

=== Semi-final 5 ===
Order	Finished	Artist	Act	Country	Buzzes and judges' choices		
Order	Finished	Artist	Act	Country	Jan	Lucie	Jaro
1	-	Eva Slaná and Lucie Klasek	Violinists	Czech Republic	—	—	—
2	3rd (lost judges' vote)	Jakub Ressler	Dancer	Czech Republic	—	—	—
3	-	Trampolíny Praha	Acrobatics on trampoline	Czech Republic	—	—	—
4	2nd (won judges' vote)	Veronika Stýblová	Singer	Czech Republic	✔	✔	✔
5	-	Železný muž Alojz Morovič	Comedian	Czech Republic	—	X	—
6	1st (won public vote)	Mighty Shake Zastávka	Dance group	Czech Republic			
7	-	Silvayovci	Band	Slovakia	—	—	—
8	-	Pavlína Matiová	Singer	Czech Republic	—	—	—
9	-	NeoPercussio	Drum band	Czech Republic	—	—	—

=== Semi-final 6 ===
Order	Finished	Artist	Act	Country	Buzzes and judges' choices		
Order	Finished	Artist	Act	Country	Jan	Lucie	Jaro
1	-	Jarko Krigovský	Dance	Slovakia	—	—	—
2	2nd (won judges' vote)	Dae Men	Acrobalance	Czech Republic	✔		✔
3	-	Zdeněk Kožušník	Illusionist	Czech Republic	—	—	—
4	-	Phantoms Crew	Dance group	Slovakia	—	—	—
5	-	Kristýna Procházková	Singer	Czech Republic	—	—	—
6	3rd (lost judges' vote)	Sabrosa	Band	Slovakia	—	✔	—
7	-	Queenie	Queen revival	Czech Republic	—	—	—
8	-	Vanesa Šanková and Marek Peťko	Dancing	Slovakia	—	—	—
9	1st (won public vote)	NH6	Rappers	Slovakia			

=== Semi-final 7 ===
Order	Finished	Artist	Act	Country	Buzzes and judges' choices		
Order	Finished	Artist	Act	Country	Jan	Lucie	Jaro
1	2nd (won judges' vote)	Patrik Žiga	Saxophonist	Slovakia	✔		✔
2	-	Brasil show	Dance group	Czech Republic	—	—	—
3	-	BMX Show	BMX	Czech Republic	—	—	—
4	-	Tereza Anna Mašková	Singer	Czech Republic	—	—	—
5	-	Duo Aratron Aspis	Fakir show	Slovakia	—	—	—
6	-	A. J. Band	Band	Slovakia	—	X	X
7	-	Akademia SX	Acrobalance	Slovakia	—	—	—
8	1st (won public vote)	Richard Nedvěd	Illusionist	Czech Republic			
9	3rd (lost judges' vote)	František Šimčík	Dancer	Czech Republic	—	✔	—

== Grand final summary ==
The "Order" columns lists the order of appearance each act made for every episode.

Key	X Buzzed out	Winner	Runner-up	3rd Place

=== Grand final ===
Order	Finished	Artist	Act	Country	Buzzes and judges' choices		
Order	Finished	Artist	Act	Country	Jan	Lucie	Jaro
1	-	mako!mako	Vocal Group	Czech Republic and Slovakia	—	—	—
2	-	Chebejet	Acrobatic Group	Czech Republic	—	—	—
3	3rd Place	Marián Zázrivý	Opera singer	Slovakia			
4	-	Radek Bakalář	Illusionist	Czech Republic	—	—	—
5	-	The Pastels	Dance group	Slovakia	—	—	—
6	-	Dominika Hašková	Singer	Czech Republic	—	—	—
7	-	Katarína and Zuzana Winklerová	Singers	Slovakia	—	—	—
8	-	Křečkovi muži	Dance group	Czech Republic	—	—	—
9	-	Mighty Shake Zastávka	Dance group	Czech Republic	—	—	—
10	-	Veronika Stýblová	Singer	Czech Republic	—	—	—
11	-	NH6	Rappers	Slovakia	—	—	—
12	Winners	Dae Men	Acrobalance	Czech Republic			
13	Runner-up	Richard Nedvěd	Illusionist	Czech Republic			
14	-	Patrik Žiga	Saxophonist	Slovakia	—	—	—
