= Dominika Hašková =

Czech singer

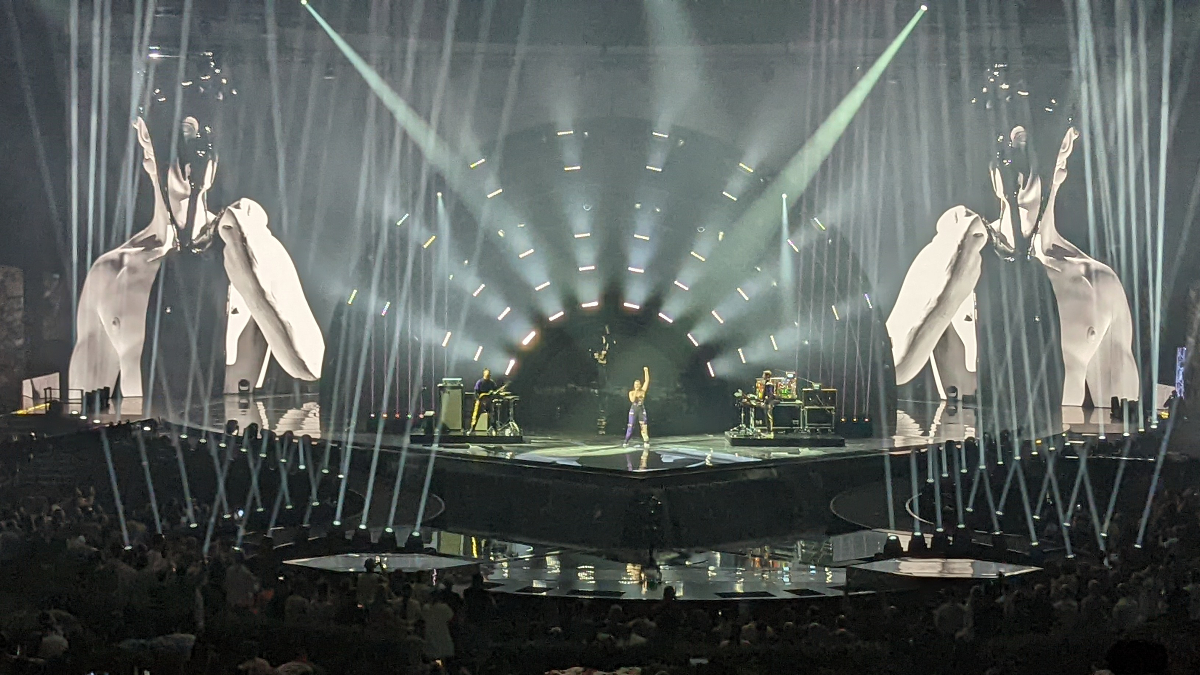
- Hašková performing "Lights Off" in the second Eurovision 2022 semi-finals.
- Born: 3 May 1995 (age 31); Buffalo, New York, USA
- Education: Leeds College of Music
- Father: Dominik Hašek
- Musical career
- Origin: Prague, Czech Republic
- Genre: Electropop
- Occupation: Singer
- Instrument: Vocalist
- Member of: We Are Domi

Dominika "Domi" Hašková (born 3 May 1995) is an American and Czech singer who represented the Czech Republic in the Eurovision Song Contest in 2022 with her electro-pop group We Are Domi. The band made it to the finals and finished 22nd overall.

== Early life ==
Hašková was born on 3 May 1995 in Buffalo, New York, USA to Dominik Hašek and Alena Hašková. Her father was goalie for the Buffalo Sabres between 1992 and 2001. They left Buffalo in 2002 after her father was traded to the Detroit Red Wings. They spent the 2005–06 NHL season in Ottawa, Canada before returning to Detroit. The family moved to Prague's Vršovice district, where she attended an international school, when she was 13. Her parents divorced in 2012. She has an older brother, Michal, and a younger brother from her father's second marriage.

Hašková began playing the transverse flute when she was six because it made her feel like a princess. In Prague, she sang in the choir and took private singing lessons and considered studying musicals prior to her audition for Leeds College of Music, when she decided to pursue singing. She stopped playing flute during university to focus on singing, composing and performing.

== Music ==
At age 15 in 2010, Hašková participated in the inaugural run of Česko Slovensko má talent, where she was one of fourteen acts chosen for the finals. After her first year at Leeds College of Music, she attended a Norwegian jazz camp to learn more about Scandinavian music. In her second year, she met Norwegian classmates Casper Hatlestad and Benjamin Rekstad, with whom she formed We Are Domi in 2016. They released their first song, "Let Me Follow", in 2018. After the COVID-19 pandemic started in the UK and they finished their Master's degrees, they moved the band's center of operations to Prague.

We Are Domi gained popularity after being chosen to represent the Czech Republic in the Eurovision Song Contest 2022 with their song "Lights Off". They reached the finals and finished 22nd overall.

== Personal life ==
Because she was raised in the United States and later attended an international school in Prague, Hašková's main language is English and she speaks Czech without an accent.
