= We Are One (Wild Youth song) =

2023 song by Wild Youth

Single by Wild Youth
- Released: 27 January 2023
- Length: 3:03 (original version); 2:52 (Eurovision version)
- Label: Imperfectly Perfect
- Songwriters: Conor O'Donohoe; Ed Porter; Jörgen Elofsson

Wild Youth singles chronology
"Modern Colosseum" (2022)	"We Are One" (2023)	"All Again For You" (2023)

Music video
- "We Are One" on YouTube

Eurovision Song Contest 2023 entry
- Country: Ireland
- Artist: Wild Youth
- Composers: Conor O'Donohoe; Ed Porter; Jörgen Elofsson
- Lyricists: Conor O'Donohoe; Ed Porter; Jörgen Elofsson

Finals performance
- Semi-final result: 12th
- Semi-final points: 10

Entry chronology
- ◄ "That's Rich" (2022)
- "Doomsday Blue" (2024) ►

Official performance video
- "We Are One" (First Semi-Final) on YouTube

"We Are One" is a song by Irish pop band Wild Youth, released on 27 January 2023. The song represented Ireland in the Eurovision Song Contest 2023 after winning Eurosong 2023, Ireland's national selection for that year's Eurovision Song Contest. Prior to the contest, the song peaked at number 93 on the Irish Singles Chart.

== Background ==
In an interview with Eurovision fansite ESCBubble, band frontman Conor O'Donohoe said that the song is inspired by the mission that the Eurovision Song Contest brings unity to Europe, hoping that the song would bring a message of unity and peace to people.

== Eurovision Song Contest ==
=== Eurosong 2023 ===
Eurosong 2023 is the national final format developed by RTÉ in order to select Ireland's entry for the Eurovision Song Contest 2023. The competition was broadcast during a special edition of The Late Late Show. The winner was chosen by a combination of a professional national jury, an international jury and televote.

The final of Eurosong 2023 was held on 3 February 2023 at the Studio 4 of RTÉ in Dublin, hosted by Ryan Tubridy. In the final, the song earned a total of 34 points out of the maximum 36, earning 12 in both the national jury and the televote, earning the Irish spot to the Eurovision Song Contest.

=== At Eurovision ===
According to Eurovision rules, all nations with the exceptions of the host country and the "Big Five" (France, Germany, Italy, Spain and the United Kingdom) are required to qualify from one of two semi-finals in order to compete for the final; the top ten countries from each semi-final progress to the final. The European Broadcasting Union (EBU) split up the competing countries into six different pots based on voting patterns from previous contests, with countries with favourable voting histories put into the same pot. On 31 January 2023, an allocation draw was held which placed each country into one of the two semi-finals, as well as which half of the show they would perform in. Ireland was placed into the first semi-final, held on 9 May 2023, and was performed in the first half of the show. "We Are One" failed to qualify for the final.

== Charts ==
Chart performance for "We Are One"
Chart (2023)	Peak position
Ireland (IRMA)	93
Irish Homegrown Top 20 (IRMA/OCC)	3
