= Lights Off =

2021 single by We Are Domi

Single by We Are Domi

from the EP We Are Domi
- Released: 6 December 2021
- Genre: Scandipop; electropop; dance
- Length: 2:58 (original version); 2:59 (Eurovision version)
- Songwriters: Einar Eriksen Kvaløy; Abigail Frances Jones; Dominika Hašková; Casper Hatlestad; Benjamin Rekstad

We Are Domi singles chronology
"Come Get Lost" (2021)	"Lights Off" (2021)	"High-Speed Kissing" (2022)

Alternative cover
- Original version cover

Music video
- "Lights Off" on YouTube

Eurovision Song Contest 2022 entry
- Country: Czech Republic
- Artist: We Are Domi
- Language: English
- Composers: Einar Eriksen Kvaløy; Abigail Frances Jones; Dominika Hašková; Casper Hatlestad; Benjamin Rekstad
- Lyricists: Einar Eriksen Kvaløy; Abigail Frances Jones; Dominika Hašková; Casper Hatlestad; Benjamin Rekstad

Finals performance
- Semi-final result: 4th
- Semi-final points: 227
- Final result: 22nd
- Final points: 38

Entry chronology
- ◄ "Omaga" (2021)
- "My Sister's Crown" (2023) ►

"Lights Off" is a song performed by Czech-Norwegian electropop band We Are Domi. The song represented the Czech Republic in the Eurovision Song Contest 2022 in Turin, Italy.

== Lyrics ==
The lyrics of "Lights Off" discuss the act of moving on from a break up. The song's opening showcases feelings of regret and despair, the band's lead singer Dominika sings about how she "lost her soul" and "forgot her way". The chorus reinforces the theme of break-ups most notably with the line "where are you now when I miss you, you’re sailing around in my peripheral, where are you?" The second verse possesses a more uplifting and powerful message as she mentions that she's "small but mighty"; this positive message is contrasted with her temptation to close herself off as she sings that she'll "build a fortress" and "be the wall".

== Eurovision Song Contest ==
=== Before Eurovision ===
Eurovision Song CZ 2022 was the national final organised by Česká Televize in order to select the Czech entry for the Eurovision Song Contest 2022. The competition involved seven contestants and took place between 7 and 15 December 2021. The winner was determined by the combination of votes from a twelve-member international jury panel (50%), an international public vote (25%) and a Czech public vote (25%). Both the international and Czech public vote were held via the official Eurovision Song Contest app. "Lights Off" came first with both the jury and the international televote but it only came fourth with the Czech televote, it won the competition with 21 points, 4 more than the runner-up.

=== At Eurovision ===
On 25 January 2022, an allocation draw was held which placed each country participating in the Eurovision Song Contest 2022 into one of the two semi-finals, as well as which half of the show they would perform in. The Czech Republic competed in the second semi-final, held on 12 May 2022, the last of the 18 countries to perform. They were one of 10 countries that received enough votes to advance to the final of the competition, where they were drawn to perform in the first half of the show and placed as the first entry out of 25. They placed 22nd out of the 25 acts that performed with 38 points.

== Charts ==
Chart performance for "Lights Off"
Chart (2022)	Peak position
Czech Republic Airplay (ČNS IFPI)	17
Czech Republic (Rádio – Top 50 CZ)	5
Lithuania (AGATA)	43
Sweden Heatseeker (Sverigetopplistan)	4
UK Singles Downloads (OCC)	27
