= Janet Grogan =

Irish Singer-Songwriter

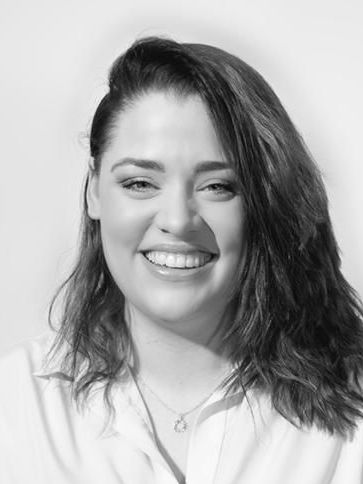

Background information
- Also known as: JG
- Born: Janet Grogan; 1988 (age 36–37); Dublin, Ireland
- Genres: Pop, Soul
- Instruments: Vocals, Piano, Guitar
- Years active: 2009–present

Janet Grogan is an Irish singer and songwriter. She comes from Dublin, Ireland.

== Training ==
In 2008, Grogan studied Pop Music Design at the Popakademie Baden-Württemberg in Mannheim, Germany as an exchange student on a scholarship.

== Career ==
Grogan became known as the co-writer and vocalist of Alles kann besser werden by Xavier Naidoo, which charted in Germany(No. 6, 33 weeks), Austria (No. 16, 26 weeks) and Switzerland (No. 28, 26 weeks). She composed the track with Milan Martelli, Matthew Tasa and Xavier Naidoo.

In 2018, Janet wrote the song "Lord (It's ok)" with Cian Sweeney, known professionally as 1000 Beasts. Grogan also performed the lead vocal on the track which was released in early 2018.

=== X-Factor ===
Janet has twice been a contestant on the UK singing competition The X-Factor (UK)

In 2014 Janet competed on the 11th series, making it as far as the 6 Chair Challenge, but was unsuccessful in keeping the chair. When the show aired Simon Cowell tweeted out that he made a mistake and should have kept Janet.

Grogan later returned, in part due to Cowell's tweet, and was a contestant in the 13th series of The X-Factor (UK), getting to Judges' houses as part of Sharon Osbourne's Team.

=== Eurovision ===
Grogan was a backing singer for Nicky Byrne at the Eurovision Song Contest 2016. Janet returned to the Eurovision stage to represent Ireland in 2018 as part of Ryan O'Shaughnessy's performance of "Together".

=== Last Singer Standing ===
In 2021, Grogan took part as a contestant on the RTÉ One singing gameshow, Last Singer Standing. She was the last player to qualify for the grand finale. In the final, she performed Whitney Houston's 'I Want to Dance with Somebody'. She finished in sixth place.

=== Eurosong 2022 ===
On 18 January 2022, it was announced that Janet would be performing for a chance to represent Ireland at Eurovision 2022 with the song Ashes of Yesterday. The song was written by Aidan O'Connor, John Emil and Sandra Wikström

Janet has previous experience at the Eurovision as a backing vocalist for Nicky Byrne in 2016, and with Ryan O'Shaughnessy in 2018.

Grogan finished in second place in the Irish National Final.

Janet released Ashes of Yesterday as her first solo single on 4 February 2022, with the song available to buy and across all streaming platforms.
