= Česko Slovensko má talent =

Czech-Slovak reality television series

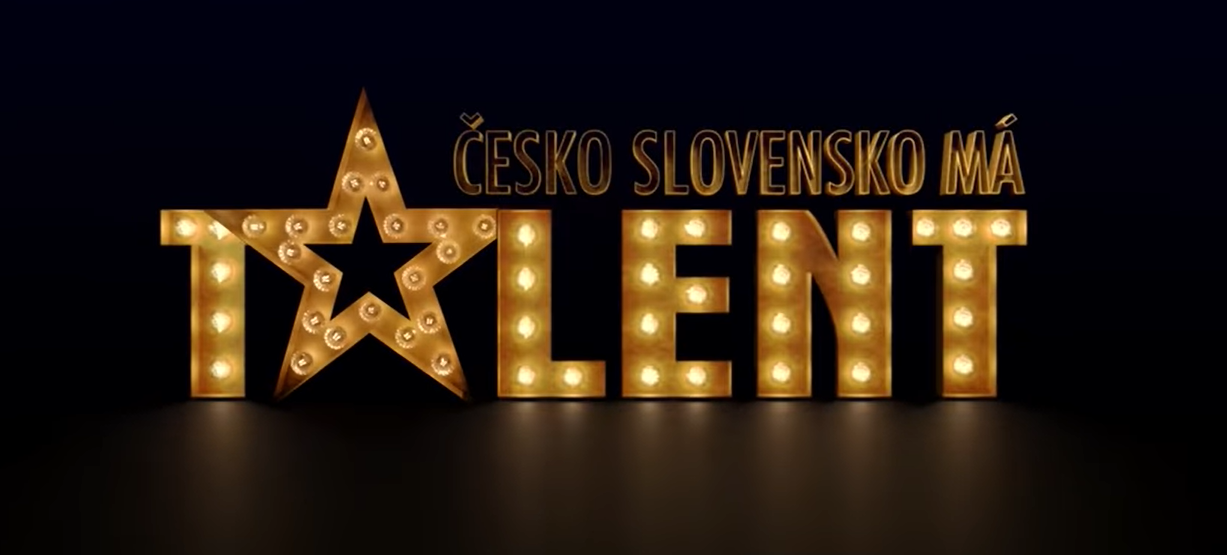
- Genre: Talent show
- Created by: Simon Cowell
- Directed by: Jeffo Minařík
- Presented by: David Gránský (2018–present); Jasmina Alagič (2021–present); Lujza Garajová Schrameková (2018–2019); Marcel Forgáč (2015–2016); Milan Zimnýkoval (2015–2016); Martin "Pyco" Rausch (2010–2013); Jakub Prachař (2010–2013)
- Judges: Jaro Slávik (2010–present); Marta Jandová (2018–present); Diana Mórová (2015–present); Jakub Prachař (2015–); Lucie Bílá (2010–2016); Leoš Mareš (2013, 2024); Martin Dejdar (2011–2012); Jan Kraus (2010); Jiřina Bohdalová (2019); Michal Hudák (2019); Rytmus (2019); Eva Holubová (2019); Štěpán Kozub (2023); Ego (2023); Marián Čekovský (2023); Vojtěch Dyk (2023); Jan Bendig (2023); Mária Čírová (2024); Eva Burešová (2024)
- Countries of origin: Czech Republic; Slovakia
- Original languages: Czech; Slovak
- No. of series: 12

Production
- Production locations: Various (auditions); Incheba Expo (live shows); A4 Studio (live shows–since 2022)
- Running time: 60–150 minutes
- Production companies: Syco TV; Thames (2012–); Talkback Thames (2010–2011)

Original release
- Network: Prima; TV JOJ
- Release: 29 August 2010

Česko Slovensko má talent (lit. 'Czechia-Slovakia's Got Talent') is a Czech-Slovak reality television series. A talent show competition that started in August 2010, it originated from the Got Talent franchise. The show is a Thames production (formerly Talkback Thames) distributed by FremantleMedia and is produced in association with Syco TV.

The show is broadcast on two channels: Prima (Czech Republic) and TV JOJ (Slovakia). Anyone of any age with any sort of talent can audition for the show. Acts compete against each other to gain audience support while trying to become "the winner of Czechoslovakia's Got Talent".

== Presenters ==
Key
Presenter of Česko Slovensko má talent

Presenter	Season 1	Season 2	Season 3	Season 4	Season 5	Season 6	Season 7	Season 8	Season 9	Season 10	Season 11	Season 12
Jasmina Alagič Vrbovská												
David Gránský												
Lujza Schrameková												
Marcel Forgáč												
Milan Zimnýkoval												
Martin "Pyco" Rausch												
Jakub Prachař												

=== Judging panel ===
Key
Judging panel

Judge	Season 1	Season 2	Season 3	Season 4	Season 5	Season 6	Season 7	Season 8	Season 9	Season 10	Season 11	Season 12
Jaro Slávik												
Diana Mórová												
Jakub Prachař												
Marta Jandová												
Leoš Mareš												
Lucie Bílá												
Martin Dejdar												
Jan Kraus												
Jiřina Bohdalová												
Michal Hudák												
Rytmus												
Eva Holubová												
Štěpán Kozub												
Michal "Ego" Straka												
Marián Čekovský												
Vojtěch Dyk												
Jan Bendig												
Mária Čírová												
Eva Burešová												

== Series overview ==
Series	Start	Finish	Winner	Runner-up	Third place	Host(s)	Judging panel
1	29 August 2010	28 November 2010	DaeMan	Richard Nedvěd	Marián Zázrivý	Martin "Pyco" Rausch; Jakub Prachař	Jan Kraus; Lucie Bílá; Jaro Slávik
2	4 September 2011	27 November 2011	Atai Omurzakov	Jo-Joo	La Gioia	Martin "Pyco" Rausch; Jakub Prachař	Martin Dejdar; Lucie Bílá; Jaro Slávik
3	9 September 2012	25 November 2012	Jozef Pavlusík	Alex Dowis	Andrej Kampf	Martin "Pyco" Rausch; Jakub Prachař	Martin Dejdar; Lucie Bílá; Jaro Slávik
4	15 September 2013	8 December 2013	Miroslav Sýkora	Alena Smolíková and Jerry	Miroslav Brusie Žilka	Martin "Pyco" Rausch; Jakub Prachař	Leoš Mareš; Lucie Bílá; Jaro Slávik
5	1 September 2015	21 November 2015	Gyöngyi Bodišová	Big Names	Juraj Hnilica	Marcel Forgáč; Milan Zimnýkoval	Jakub Prachař; Diana Mórová; Lucie Bílá; Jaro Slávik
6	19 September 2016	27 November 2016	ACT 4 Slovakia	Martin Vetrák	Tumar	Marcel Forgáč; Milan Zimnýkoval	Jakub Prachař; Diana Mórová; Lucie Bílá; Jaro Slávik
7	31 August 2018	1 December 2018	Nikoleta Šurinová	Boki	Růžena Kováčová	David Gránský; Lujza Schrameková	Jakub Prachař; Diana Mórová; Marta Jandová; Jaro Slávik
8	30 August 2019	7 December 2019	Margaréta Ondrejková	Samuel Rychtář	Volha Safronova	David Gránský; Lujza Schrameková	Jakub Prachař; Diana Mórová; Marta Jandová; Jaro Slávik
9	3 September 2021	11 December 2021	Diamonds	Dominika Titková	Noro Grofčík	David Gránský; Jasmina Alagič Vrbovská	Jakub Prachař; Diana Mórová; Marta Jandová; Jaro Slávik
10	27 August 2022	11 December 2021				David Gránský; Jasmina Alagič Vrbovská	Jakub Prachař; Diana Mórová; Marta Jandová; Jaro Slávik
Specials (Špeciály)	2 January 2023	5 January 2023				David Gránský; Jasmina Alagič Vrbovská	Jakub Prachař; Diana Mórová; Marta Jandová; Jaro Slávik
11	3 September 2023	10 December 2023				David Gránský; Jasmina Alagič Vrbovská	Jakub Prachař; Diana Mórová; Marta Jandová; Jaro Slávik
12	30 August 2024	December 7, 2024				David Gránský; Jasmina Alagič Vrbovská	Jakub Prachař; Diana Mórová; Leoš Mareš; Marta Jandová; Jaro Slávik
