= That's Rich =

2022 song by Brooke Scullion

Single by Brooke

from the EP Chaotic Heart
- Released: 19 January 2022
- Genre: Pop
- Length: 3:01
- Label: V2 Records Benelux
- Songwriter(s): Brooke Scullion; Izzy Warner; Karl Zine

Brooke singles chronology
"Attention" (2020)	"That's Rich" (2022)	"Tongues" (2022)

Music video
- "That's Rich" on YouTube

Eurovision Song Contest 2022 entry
- Country: Ireland
- Artist(s): Brooke Scullion

Finals performance
- Semi-final result: 15th
- Semi-final points: 47

Entry chronology
- ◄ "Maps" (2021)
- "We Are One" (2023) ►

"That's Rich" is a song by Irish singer Brooke Scullion. The song represented Ireland in the Eurovision Song Contest 2022 in Turin, Italy.

== Eurovision Song Contest ==
=== Eurosong 2022 ===
On 16 September 2021, Ireland's national broadcaster, Raidió Teilifís Éireann (RTÉ) opened a submission period where artists and composers were able to submit their entries for the competition until 22 October 2021. The finalists were presented between 17 and 21 January 2022 on The Ryan Tubridy Show broadcast on RTÉ Radio 1.

Eurosong 2022 was the national final format developed by RTÉ in order to select Ireland's entry for the Eurovision Song Contest 2022. The competition was broadcast during a special edition of The Late Late Show held on 4 February 2022. Following the combination of votes from the studio jury, an international jury and public televoting, "That's Rich" was selected as the winner.

=== At Eurovision ===
The 66th edition of the Eurovision Song Contest took place in Turin, Italy and consisted of two semi-finals on 10 May and 12 May 2022, and the grand final on 14 May 2022. According to Eurovision rules, all nations with the exceptions of the host country and the "Big Five" (France, Germany, Italy, Spain and the United Kingdom) are required to qualify from one of two semi-finals in order to compete for the final; the top ten countries from each semi-final progress to the final. The European Broadcasting Union (EBU) split up the competing countries into six different pots based on voting patterns from previous contests, with countries with favourable voting histories put into the same pot. Scullion performed in 10th position out of the 18 acts in semi-final 2 on 12 May. Despite her performance being described as "brilliant" by national media, "That's Rich" failed to qualify for the final.

== Charts ==
Chart performance for "That's Rich"
Chart (2022)	Peak position
Ireland (IRMA)	54
