= Only Love Survives =

2013 single by Ryan Dolan

Single by Ryan Dolan
- Released: 8 February 2013
- Length: 3:00
- Songwriters: Wez Devine; Ryan Dolan

Ryan Dolan singles chronology
"Only Love Survives" (2013)	"Start Again" (2014)
- Ryan Dolan presenting the song.

Eurovision Song Contest 2013 entry
- Country: Ireland
- Artist: Ryan Dolan
- Language: English
- Composers: Wez Devine and Ryan Dolan
- Lyricists: Wez Devine and Ryan Dolan

Finals performance
- Semi-final result: 8th
- Semi-final points: 54
- Final result: 26th
- Final points: 5

Entry chronology
- ◄ "Waterline" (2012)
- "Heartbeat" (2014) ►

"Only Love Survives" is a song recorded by Irish singer-songwriter Ryan Dolan and was selected to represent Ireland in the Eurovision Song Contest 2013 in Malmö, Sweden. The song was performed at the first semi final and successfully advanced to the final. Dolan performed the song on 18 May 2013 at the final with 25 other countries. The song finished in 26th place with 5 points.

"Only Love Survives" features wild drum sounds against a dance beat, with high range vocals and lyrics about love and empowerment. It was well received by music critics who appreciated its new sound and energetic nature.

== Background ==
Under the Eurosong mentor system, producer Stuart O'Connor selected Dolan and his song as one of the five Eurosong contestants. "Only Love Survives" was debuted on the RTÉ Radio 1 programme Mooney on 7 February and was released on iTunes the following day.

The song was selected as the winner on 22 February on Eurosong 2013, receiving 52 points from the regional juries and the maximum of 60 points from the televote, making a total of 112 points.

At Eurovision 2013, Ryan competed in the first semi-final on 14 May and earned a place in the final on 18 May. He finished last in the final which was Ireland's second time finishing in that position.

== Track listing ==
- Digital download
1. "Only Love Survives" – 3:00

== Chart performance ==
Chart performance for "Only Love Survives"
Chart (2013)	Peak position
Belgium (Ultratip Bubbling Under Flanders)	67
Ireland (IRMA)	13
Sweden (DigiListan)	48
UK Indie (OCC)	33
