= Lithuania in the Eurovision Song Contest 2023 =

- Eurovision Song Contest 2023
- Participating broadcaster: Lithuanian National Radio and Television (LRT)
- Country: Lithuania
- Selection process: Pabandom iš naujo! 2023
- Selection date: 18 February 2023

Competing entry
- Song: "Stay"
- Artist: Monika Linkytė
- Songwriters: Monika Linkytė; Krists Indrišonoks

Placement
- Semi-final result: Qualified (4th, 110 points)
- Final result: 11th, 127 points

Participation chronology

Lithuania was represented at the Eurovision Song Contest 2023 with the song "Stay", written by Monika Linkytė and Krists Indrišonoks, and performed by Linkytė herself. The Lithuanian participating broadcaster, the Lithuanian National Radio and Television (LRT), organised the national final Pabandom iš naujo! 2023 to select its entry for the contest.

Lithuania was drawn to compete in the second semi-final of the Eurovision Song Contest which took place on 11 May 2023 and was later selected to perform in position 15. At the end of the show, "Stay" was announced among the top 10 entries of the second semi-final and hence qualified to compete in the final. It was later revealed that Lithuania placed fourth out of the sixteen participating countries in the semi-final with 110 points. In the final, Lithuania performed in position 22 and placed eleventh out of the 26 participating countries, scoring a total of 127 points.

== Background ==
Prior to the 2023 contest, the Lithuanian National Radio and Television (LRT) had participated in the Eurovision Song Contest representing Lithuania 22 times since its first entry in 1994. Its best placing in the contest was sixth, which it achieved in 2006 with the song "We Are the Winners", performed by LT United. Following the introduction of semi-finals in 2004, Lithuania, to this point, had managed to qualify to the final 11 times. It was represented in 2022 by the song "Sentimentai", performed by Monika Liu, who qualified for the final and ended 14th overall with 128 points.

As part of its duties as participating broadcaster, LRT organises the selection of its entry in the Eurovision Song Contest and broadcasts the event in the country. Other than the internal selection of their debut entry in 1994, LRT has selected all of its entries through a national final procedure: "Eurovizijos" dainų konkurso nacionalinė atranka between 1999 and 2019, and Pabandom iš naujo! since 2020. LRT confirmed its participation in the Eurovision Song Contest 2023 on 29 July 2022. On 11 October 2022, the broadcaster announced the organization of Pabandom iš naujo!, which would be the national final format to select its entry for Liverpool.

== Before Eurovision ==
=== Pabandom iš naujo! 2023 ===
Pabandom iš naujo! 2023 ("Let's try again! 2023") was the national final format developed by LRT in order to select Lithuania's entry for the Eurovision Song Contest 2023. The competition involved a five-week-long process that commenced on 21 January 2023 and concluded with a final on 18 February 2023. The six shows took place at the LRT studios in Vilnius and were hosted by Giedrius Masalskis, Augustė Nombeko and Richardas Jonaitis. The shows were broadcast on LRT televizija, LRT Lituanica and LRT Radijas as well as online via the broadcaster's website lrt.lt and official YouTube channel.

==== Format ====
The 2023 competition involved 30 entries and consisted of five shows. The first two shows were the heats consisting of 15 entries each. The top ten entries advanced in the competition from each heat, while the remaining 20 entries participated in the third and fourth shows which were the competition's semi-finals where ten entries participated in each show and the top five proceeded to the final. In the final, the winner was selected from the remaining ten entries. The broadcaster allocated up to €1,500 to be divided for each of the competing artists in order to support their preparations for the national final. A monetary prize of €5,000 was also awarded to the winning songwriters by the Lithuanian Copyright Protection Association (LATGA).

The results of each of the five shows were determined by the 50/50 combination of votes from a jury panel and public televoting. The ranking developed by both streams of voting was converted to points from 1–8, 10 and 12 and assigned based on the number of competing songs in the respective show. The public could vote through telephone and SMS voting. Ties in all shows were decided in favour of the entry that received the most points from the jury.

==== Competing entries ====
LRT opened a submission period on 11 October 2022 for artists and songwriters to submit their entries with the deadline on 12 December 2022. On 20 December 2022, LRT announced the 30 artists selected for the competition from more than 60 submissions received. Among the artists was Monika Linkytė who represented Lithuania in 2015. The nine-member jury panel that selected the competing entries consisted of Gytis Oganauskas (LRT deputy director general), Audrius Giržadas (LRT televizija chief producer), Ramūnas Zilnys (LRT pop music editor-in-chief), Darius Užkuraitis (LRT Opus senior music editor), Lina Patskočimaitė (Head of LRT's digital assets department), Rūta Putnikienė (Head of LRT's communication and marketing department), Miglė Savickaitė (LRT public relations representative), Povilas Varvuolis (television director) and Vytautas Bikus (composer).

On 23 December 2022, the final changes to the list of 36 competing acts were made with the addition of the band The Pixls following the disqualification of Lina Štalytė due to her song being previously published in 2020.

Key: Withdrawn Replacement entry

Artist	Song	Songwriter(s)
Agnė	"New Start"	Agnė Buškevičiūtė-Tumalavičienė, Vilius Tumalavičius
Aistė Pilvelytė	"We're Not Running"	Justine Eltakchi, Aidan O'Connor
Alen Chicco	"Do You"	Tomas Alenčikas
Antikvariniai Kašpirovskio dantys	"Sėdi ir važiuoji"	Martynas Enčius, Karolis Steponavičius
Baiba	"When the Lights Go Out"	Baiba Skurstene, Andrius Kairys
Beatrich	"Like a Movie"	Marc Dowding, Beatričė Pundžiūtė
Donata	"Dreamer"	Ylva Persson, Linda Persson, Janne Hyöty, Christopher Wortley
Gabrielius Vagelis	"Šauksmas"	Kim Wennerström, Gabrielius Vagelis
Gebrasy	"Saw Your Ghost"	Faustas Venckus, Audrius Petrauskas
Il Senso	"Sparnai"	Merūnas Vitulskis
I.T.	"Žinau, tai tu"	Ingrida Toleikytė-Mikalauskienė
Joseph June	"Vacuum"	Vytautas Gumbelevičius
Justa Rubežiūtė	"When I'll Find"	Algirdas Veževičius, Justinas Stanislovaitis
Justė Kraujelytė	"Need More Fun"	Justė Kraujelytė, Edgaras Žaltauskas, Kasparas Meginis
Justin 3 feat. Dj AugustYno	"Not Giving Up"	Algirdas Veževičius, Justinas Stanislovaitis
~~Lina Štalytė~~	~~"My Body"~~	~~Lina Štalytė~~
Luknė	"Paradise"	Rob Price
Mario Junes	"Do What You Do"	Marius Kijauskas, Faustas Venckus
Matt Len	"Midnight Train"	Matas Lenktis
Melona	"Song of Whispers"	Algirdas Veževičius, Illona Podrabinkína, Justinas Stanislovaitis
Monika Linkytė	"Stay"	Monika Linkytė, Krists Indrišonoks
MoonBee	"Rumor"	Austėja Pukelytė, Gytis Valickas
Multiks	"London"	Paulius Burba
Noy	"Destiny's Child"	Nojus Žebrauskas, Viktorija Raibužytė, Rita Dmitrijenko, Dominykas Zalieckas
Paulina Paukštaitytė	"Let Me Think About Me"	Paulina Paukštaitytė, Krists Indrišonoks, Jānis Jačmenkins
Petunija	"Love of My Life"	Agnė Šiaulytė, Diana Anisko, Morta Grigaliūnaitė, Egidija Mačiulytė
Rūta Mur	"So Low"	Rūta Murinaitė
The Pixls	"Šaukt"	Mantvydas Sabaitis, Kęstutis Vaitkevičius, The Pixls
Viktorija Faith	"If You Ever Miss Me"	Viktorija Faith
Voldemars Petersons	"Things"	Voldemars Petersons
W.I	"You Can Not"	Viktoras Olechnovičius, Ieva Lapinskaitė

==== Jury members ====
The jury panel consisted of five members in the heats and the semi-finals, and seven members in the final.

Jury members by show
Jury member	Heats		Semi-finals		Final	Occupation(s)
Jury member	1	2	1	2	Final	Occupation(s)
Duncan Laurence	No	No	No	Yes	No	Dutch singer, winner of Eurovision Song Contest 2019
Gerūta Griniūtė	No	No	No	No	Yes	radio host
Giedrė Kilčiauskienė	Yes	Yes	No	No	No	singer, composer
Ieva Narkutė	Yes	Yes	Yes	Yes	Yes	singer-songwriter
Jievaras Jasinskis	Yes	No	No	No	Yes	composer
Leonas Somovas	Yes	No	Yes	No	No	producer, composer
Monika Liu	No	No	No	Yes	Yes	singer
Raminta Naujalytė-Bjelle	No	No	No	No	Yes	singer, Head of the LATGA Council
Ramūnas Zilnys	Yes	Yes	Yes	Yes	Yes	LRT pop music editor-in-chief
Stanislavas Stavickis-Stano	No	Yes	Yes	No	Yes	singer, composer, producer
Vaidotas Valiukevičius	No	No	No	Yes	Yes	vocalist for the band The Roop
Vytautas Bikus	No	Yes	Yes	No	Yes	composer

==== Shows ====
===== Heats =====
The two heats of the competition were filmed on 17 and 23 January 2023 and aired on 21 and 28 January 2023, featuring 15 entries each. The top ten entries advanced to the semi-finals from each heat, while the bottom five were eliminated.

Heat 1 – 21 January 2023
R/O	Artist	Song	Jury	Televote		Total	Place
R/O	Artist	Song	Jury	Votes	Points	Total	Place
1	Aistė Pilvelytė	"We're Not Running"	2	207	0	2	11
2	Joseph June	"Vacuum"	2	414	4	6	8
3	Il Senso	"Sparnai"	2	466	6	8	7
4	W.I	"You Can Not"	0	162	0	0	15
5	Multiks	"London"	0	279	1	1	13
6	Luknė	"Paradise"	3	201	0	3	10
7	Gabrielius Vagelis	"Šauksmas"	6	865	10	16	2
8	Alen Chicco	"Do You"	8	467	7	15	3
9	Rūta Mur	"So Low"	12	973	12	24	1
10	Justin 3 feat. Dj AugustYno	"Not Giving Up"	0	164	0	0	14
11	Baiba	"When the Lights Go Out"	5	227	0	5	9
12	Justa Rubežiūtė	"When I'll Find"	0	313	2	2	12
13	Noy	"Destiny's Child"	4	559	8	12	6
14	Paulina Paukštaitytė	"Let Me Think About Me"	7	431	5	12	5
15	Justė Kraujelytė	"Need More Fun"	10	367	3	13	4

Heat 2 – 28 January 2023
R/O	Artist	Song	Jury	Televote		Total	Place
R/O	Artist	Song	Jury	Votes	Points	Total	Place
1	Antikvariniai Kašpirovskio dantys	"Sėdi ir važiuoji"	2	527	3	5	10
2	I.T.	"Žinau, tai tu"	0	651	4	4	11
3	Donata	"Dreamer"	4	466	1	5	9
4	Matt Len	"Midnight Train"	5	780	7	12	4
5	Melona	"Song of Whispers"	0	306	0	0	13
6	Monika Linkytė	"Stay"	10	851	8	18	2
7	The Pixls	"Šaukt"	0	147	0	0	15
8	Viktorija Faith	"If You Ever Miss Me"	1	133	0	1	12
9	Agnė	"New Start"	0	918	10	10	6
10	Gebrasy	"Saw Your Ghost"	6	349	0	6	8
11	MoonBee	"Rumor"	3	698	5	8	7
12	Voldemars Petersons	"Things"	0	210	0	0	14
13	Petunija	"Love of My Life"	8	467	2	10	5
14	Beatrich	"Like a Movie"	12	955	12	24	1
15	Mario Junes	"Do What You Do"	7	744	6	13	3

===== Semi-finals =====
The two semi-finals of the competition were filmed on 31 January and 7 February 2023 and aired on 4 and 11 February 2023, each featuring ten of the 20 entries that qualified from the heats. The top five entries advanced to the final from each semi-final, while the bottom five were eliminated.

Semi-final 1 – 4 February 2023
R/O	Artist	Song	Jury	Televote		Total	Place
R/O	Artist	Song	Jury	Votes	Points	Total	Place
1	Il Senso	"Sparnai"	5	1,876	12	17	3
2	Alen Chicco	"Do You"	6	364	2	8	6
3	Baiba	"When the Lights Go Out"	4	211	1	5	10
4	Joseph June	"Vacuum"	4	420	4	8	7
5	Noy	"Destiny's Child"	1	584	6	7	9
6	Petunija	"Love of My Life"	12	936	7	19	2
7	Justė Kraujelytė	"Need More Fun"	8	396	3	11	5
8	Gabrielius Vagelis	"Šauksmas"	7	1,342	8	15	4
9	Rūta Mur	"So Low"	10	1,440	10	20	1
10	Donata	"Dreamer"	2	461	5	7	8

Semi-final 2 – 11 February 2023
R/O	Artist	Song	Jury	Televote		Total	Place
R/O	Artist	Song	Jury	Votes	Points	Total	Place
1	Paulina Paukštaitytė	"Let Me Think About Me"	8	1,383	10	18	2
2	Agnė	"New Start"	3	765	3	6	9
3	Matt Len	"Midnight Train"	4	772	4	8	7
4	Luknė	"Paradise"	2	109	1	3	10
5	Monika Linkytė	"Stay"	10	1,328	7	17	3
6	Gebrasy	"Saw Your Ghost"	6	380	2	8	6
7	MoonBee	"Rumor"	5	2,457	12	17	4
8	Beatrich	"Like a Movie"	12	1,342	8	20	1
9	Mario Junes	"Do What You Do"	7	852	5	12	5
10	Antikvariniai Kašpirovskio dantys	"Sėdi ir važiuoji"	1	964	6	7	8

===== Final =====
The final took place on 18 February 2023 and featured the remaining ten entries that qualified from the semi-finals. The final was the only show in the competition to be broadcast live; all other preceding shows were pre-recorded earlier in the week before their airdates. "So Low" performed by Rūta Mur and "Stay" performed by Monika Linkytė were tied at 22 points each after the combination of the jury vote and the public vote, but since Linkytė received received the most votes from the jury she was declared the winner. In addition to the competing entries, Ukrainian 2023 representative Tvorchi appeared as guests, while Eurovision Song Contest 2019 winner Duncan Laurence and Lithuanian 2022 representative Monika Liu performed as interval acts.

Final – 18 February 2023
R/O	Artist	Song	Jury		Televote		Total	Place
R/O	Artist	Song	Votes	Points	Votes	Points	Total	Place
1	Mario Junes	"Do What You Do"	30	3	1,102	2	5	9
2	MoonBee	"Rumor"	14	1	3,780	7	8	7
3	Justė Kraujelytė	"Need More Fun"	43	5	606	1	6	8
4	Paulina Paukštaitytė	"Let Me Think About Me"	49	6	2,910	5	11	5
5	Beatrich	"Like a Movie"	78	8	9,392	8	16	3
6	Rūta Mur	"So Low"	88	10	12,822	12	22	2
7	Il Senso	"Sparnai"	19	2	2,090	3	5	10
8	Petunija	"Love of My Life"	62	7	2,501	4	11	4
9	Gabrielius Vagelis	"Šauksmas"	42	4	3,085	6	10	6
10	Monika Linkytė	"Stay"	97	12	12,675	10	22	1

Detailed Jury Votes
R/O	Song	Juror									Total
R/O	Song	1	2	3	4	5	6	7	8	9	Total
1	"Do What You Do"	2	5	2	3	2	3	5	3	3	30
2	"Rumor"	1	2	1	2	1	2	2	2	1	14
3	"Need More Fun"	3	7	5	4	5	7	3	4	5	43
4	"Let Me Think About Me"	6	4	3	7	6	5	6	6	6	49
5	"Like a Movie"	10	8	12	10	3	10	8	10	7	78
6	"So Low"	12	10	8	8	12	8	10	8	12	88
7	"Sparnai"	4	1	4	1	4	1	1	1	2	19
8	"Love of My Life"	8	6	7	6	7	6	7	7	8	62
9	"Šauksmas"	5	3	6	5	8	4	4	3	4	42
10	"Stay"	7	12	10	12	10	12	12	12	10	97

==== Ratings ====
Viewing figures by show
Show	Air date	Viewing figures	
Show	Air date	Nominal	Share
Heat 1	21 January 2023	236,000	23.5%
Heat 2	28 January 2023	213,000	21.7%
Semi-final 1	4 February 2023	191,600	18.8%
Semi-final 2	11 February 2023	199,400	19.8%
Final	18 February 2023	310,900	28.8%

== At Eurovision ==
According to Eurovision rules, all nations with the exceptions of the host country and the "Big Five" (France, Germany, Italy, Spain and the United Kingdom) are required to qualify from one of two semi-finals in order to compete for the final; the top ten countries from each semi-final progress to the final. The European Broadcasting Union (EBU) split up the competing countries into six different pots based on voting patterns from previous contests, with countries with favourable voting histories put into the same pot. On 31 January 2023, an allocation draw was held, which placed each country into one of the two semi-finals, and determined which half of the show they would perform in. Lithuania has been placed into the second semi-final, to be held on 11 May 2023, and has been scheduled to perform in the second half of the show.

Once all the competing songs for the 2023 contest had been released, the running order for the semi-finals was decided by the shows' producers rather than through another draw, so that similar songs were not placed next to each other. Lithuania was set to perform in position 15, following the entry from Albania and before the entry from Australia.

At the end of the show, Lithuania was announced as a qualifier for the final.

=== Voting ===
==== Points awarded to Lithuania ====
Points awarded to Lithuania (Semi-final)
Score	Televote
12 points	San Marino (Note: San Marino uses a jury in the semi-finals.); United Kingdom
10 points	Estonia; Georgia; Ukraine
8 points	Cyprus
7 points	
6 points	Australia; Poland
5 points	Albania; Austria; Belgium; Denmark; Spain
4 points	Iceland; Rest of the World
3 points	
2 points	Slovenia
1 point	Romania

Points awarded to Lithuania (Final)
Score	Televote	Jury
12 points		
10 points	Ireland; Latvia; United Kingdom	Australia; Ukraine
8 points		San Marino; Slovenia; United Kingdom
7 points		Austria; Latvia
6 points		Georgia
5 points	Estonia	
4 points	Georgia; Ukraine	Denmark; Malta
3 points		Italy; Poland
2 points	San Marino	
1 point	Poland	Estonia; Germany; Ireland

==== Points awarded by Lithuania ====
Points awarded by Lithuania (Semi-final)
Score	Televote
12 points	Poland
10 points	Estonia
8 points	Australia
7 points	Slovenia
6 points	Austria
5 points	Belgium
4 points	Cyprus
3 points	Georgia
2 points	Iceland
1 point	Armenia

Points awarded by Lithuania (Final)
Score	Televote	Jury
12 points	Finland	Sweden
10 points	Ukraine	Israel
8 points	Poland	Austria
7 points	Sweden	Belgium
6 points	Italy	France
5 points	Estonia	Estonia
4 points	Croatia	Australia
3 points	Israel	Finland
2 points	Moldova	Ukraine
1 point	France	Cyprus

==== Detailed voting results ====
The following members comprised the Lithuanian jury:

- Jonas Nainys
- Julijus Grickevičius
- Vaidotas Valiukevičius
- Eglė Juozapaitienė
- Nombeko Augustė Khotseng

Detailed voting results from Lithuania (Semi-final 2)
R/O	Country	Televote	
R/O	Country	Rank	Points
01	Denmark	13	
02	Armenia	10	1
03	Romania	15	
04	Estonia	2	10
05	Belgium	6	5
06	Cyprus	7	4
07	Iceland	9	2
08	Greece	11	
09	Poland	1	12
10	Slovenia	4	7
11	Georgia	8	3
12	San Marino	14	
13	Austria	5	6
14	Albania	12	
15	Lithuania		
16	Australia	3	8

Detailed voting results from Lithuania (Final)
R/O	Country	Jury							Televote	
R/O	Country	Juror 1	Juror 2	Juror 3	Juror 4	Juror 5	Rank	Points	Rank	Points
01	Austria	5	12	8	3	2	3	8	18	
02	Portugal	23	10	13	21	17	19		23	
03	Switzerland	16	11	19	20	5	15		20	
04	Poland	10	7	18	7	12	13		3	8
05	Serbia	25	21	23	13	24	24		19	
06	France	12	2	11	4	16	5	6	10	1
07	Cyprus	19	18	5	16	3	10	1	17	
08	Spain	9	22	21	19	20	21		24	
09	Sweden	2	1	2	1	1	1	12	4	7
10	Albania	22	25	15	25	25	25		25	
11	Italy	15	4	22	12	7	12		5	6
12	Estonia	7	9	3	18	9	6	5	6	5
13	Finland	13	3	9	8	13	8	3	1	12
14	Czech Republic	14	23	16	23	21	23		16	
15	Australia	3	19	10	11	6	7	4	11	
16	Belgium	4	6	7	5	4	4	7	14	
17	Armenia	8	17	6	14	18	14		21	
18	Moldova	21	8	17	15	19	18		9	2
19	Ukraine	17	16	1	10	15	9	2	2	10
20	Norway	11	24	12	22	22	20		13	
21	Germany	18	20	14	9	8	16		15	
22	Lithuania									
23	Israel	1	5	4	6	14	2	10	8	3
24	Slovenia	20	15	24	17	11	22		12	
25	Croatia	6	14	25	24	23	17		7	4
26	United Kingdom	24	13	20	2	10	11		22	
