= Armenia in the Eurovision Song Contest 2023 =

- Eurovision Song Contest 2023
- Participating broadcaster: Public Television of Armenia (AMPTV)
- Country: Armenia
- Selection process: Internal selection
- Announcement date: Artist: 1 February 2023; Song: 15 March 2023

Competing entry
- Song: "Future Lover"
- Artist: Brunette
- Songwriters: Elen Yeremyan

Placement
- Semi-final result: Qualified (6th, 99 points)
- Final result: 14th, 122 points

Participation chronology

Armenia was represented at the Eurovision Song Contest 2023 with the song "Future Lover", written and performed by Elen Yeremyan under her stage name Brunette. The Armenian participating broadcaster, Public Television of Armenia (AMPTV), internally selected its entry for the contest. AMPTV announced Brunette on 1 February 2023, while the song "Future Lover" was presented to the public on 15 March 2023.

Armenia was drawn to compete in the second semi-final of the Eurovision Song Contest which took place on 11 May 2023. Performing during the show in position 2, "Future Lover" was announced among the top 10 entries of the second semi-final and therefore qualified to compete in the final on 13 May. It was later revealed that Armenia placed sixth out of the 16 participating countries in the semi-final with 99 points. In the final, Armenia performed in position 17 and placed fourteenth out of the 26 participating countries, scoring 122 points, marking Armenia's highest placing in the Eurovision Song Contest since 2016.

== Background ==
Prior to the 2023 contest, Public Television of Armenia (AMPTV) had participated in the Eurovision Song Contest representing Armenia fourteen times since its first entry in 2006. Its highest placing in the contest, to this point, has been fourth place, achieved on two occasions: in 2008 with the song "Qélé, Qélé" performed by Sirusho and in 2014 with the song "Not Alone" performed by Aram Mp3. Armenia had, to this point, failed to qualify to the final on three occasions, in 2011, 2018, and 2019. AMPTV briefly withdrew from the contest on two occasions: in 2012 due to long-standing tensions with then-host country Azerbaijan, and in 2021 due to social and political crises in the aftermath of the Second Nagorno-Karabakh War. In 2022, it returned to the contest, with "Snap" performed by Rosa Linn qualifying for the final and placing 20th overall.

As part of its duties as participating broadcaster, AMPTV organises the selection of its entry in the Eurovision Song Contest and broadcasts the event in the country. The broadcaster confirmed its intentions to participate at the 2023 contest on 20 October 2022. AMPTV has used various methods to select its entry in the past, such as internal selections and a live televised national final to choose the performer, song or both to compete at Eurovision. Between 2014 and 2016, and in 2019 and 2022, the broadcaster internally selected both the artist and the song, while the national final Depi Evratesil was organized in 2017, 2018 and 2020. For 2023, AMPTV opted to continue selecting its entry internally.

== Before Eurovision ==
=== Internal selection ===
AMPTV internally selected its entry for the Eurovision Song Contest 2023. On 25 January 2023, Armenian media reported that singer Brunette had been selected to represent the country with an R&B style song, though AMPTV did not comment. On 1 February 2023, AMPTV officially confirmed that Brunette would represent Armenia in the Eurovision Song Contest 2023. Following the announcement, Hovhannes Movsisyan, executive director of AMPTV, stated that "last year, sending a young artist to Eurovision was justified. The song is still successful and captivates millions of fans. I hope this year we will surprise the European audience with a unique Armenian artist." Brunette stated that "I am happy to share the news with you. I just create music, and this time I will share it with the European audience!". Her entry, "Future Lover", was released on 15 March 2023, alongside a music video which was premiered on the official Eurovision YouTube channel. The video was directed by Aramayis Hayrapetyan.

"'Future Lover' is a poetic canvas, a letter with no addressee. I remember once scrolling through my phone and seeing this beautiful quote which was such a simple yet beautiful thought that immediately inspired me. The words turned into a melody and a whole range of emotions just exploded out of me. Throughout our lives we’re all looking for the one – the future lover, the embodiment of our dreams, ideals, fears".

— Brunette

=== Promotion ===
Brunette made several appearances across Europe and Armenia to promote "Future Lover" as the Armenian Eurovision entry. On 8 April 2023, she travelled to Madrid, Spain, where she performed at the PrePartyES in Madrid's Sala La Riviera. On 15 April 2023, Brunette performed "Future Lover" at the Eurovision in Concert 2023 at Amsterdam's AFAS Live in the Netherlands.

In the run-up to the contest, AMPTV launched their annual promotional series Destination Eurovision that introduced and focused on Brunette's journey to Liverpool, and covered the preparations for her Eurovision performance. On 15 April 2023, AMPTV broadcast a special pre-recorded edition of their music programme First Studio, featuring several performances from Brunette, including the premiere of her Armenian language song "Dimak" and special orchestral versions of "Future Lover" and "Arevin Mot".

== At Eurovision ==
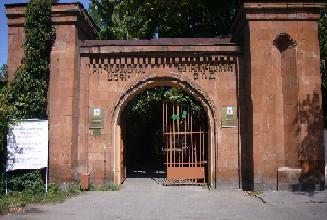
A video postcard introduced Brunette's performance in the second semi-final and final of the Eurovision Song Contest 2023. The postcard was filmed at the Yerevan Botanical Garden in March 2023 in collaboration with the host broadcaster BBC. The Eden Project in Cornwall and the Gardens of Lviv University also featured in the Armenian postcard.

According to Eurovision rules, all nations with the exceptions of the host country and the "Big Five" (France, Germany, Italy, Spain and the United Kingdom) are required to qualify from one of two semi-finals in order to compete for the final; the top ten countries from each semi-final progress to the final. The European Broadcasting Union (EBU) split up the competing countries into six different pots based on voting patterns from previous contests, with countries with favourable voting histories put into the same pot. On 31 January 2023, an allocation draw was held, which placed each country into one of the two semi-finals, and determined which half of the show they would perform in. Armenia was placed into the second semi-final, held on 11 May 2023, and was scheduled to perform in the first half of the show.

Once all the competing songs for the 2023 contest had been released, the running order for the semi-finals was decided by the shows' producers rather than through another draw, so that similar songs were not placed next to each other. Armenia was set to perform in position 2, following the entry from Denmark and before the entry from Romania. Immediately after the close of the second semi-final, a press conference was held in which each of the artists drew the half of the final of which they would perform in. Armenia was drawn into the second half of the final and was later selected by the EBU to perform in position number 17, following the entry from Belgium and before the entry from Moldova.

In Armenia, all shows were broadcast on Armenia 1 and on Public Radio of Armenia, with commentary by Hamlet Arakelyan and Hrachuhi Utmazyan. AMPTV appointed Maléna, who won Junior Eurovision for Armenia in 2021 as its spokesperson to announce the top 12-point score awarded by the Armenian jury during the final.

=== Semi-final ===
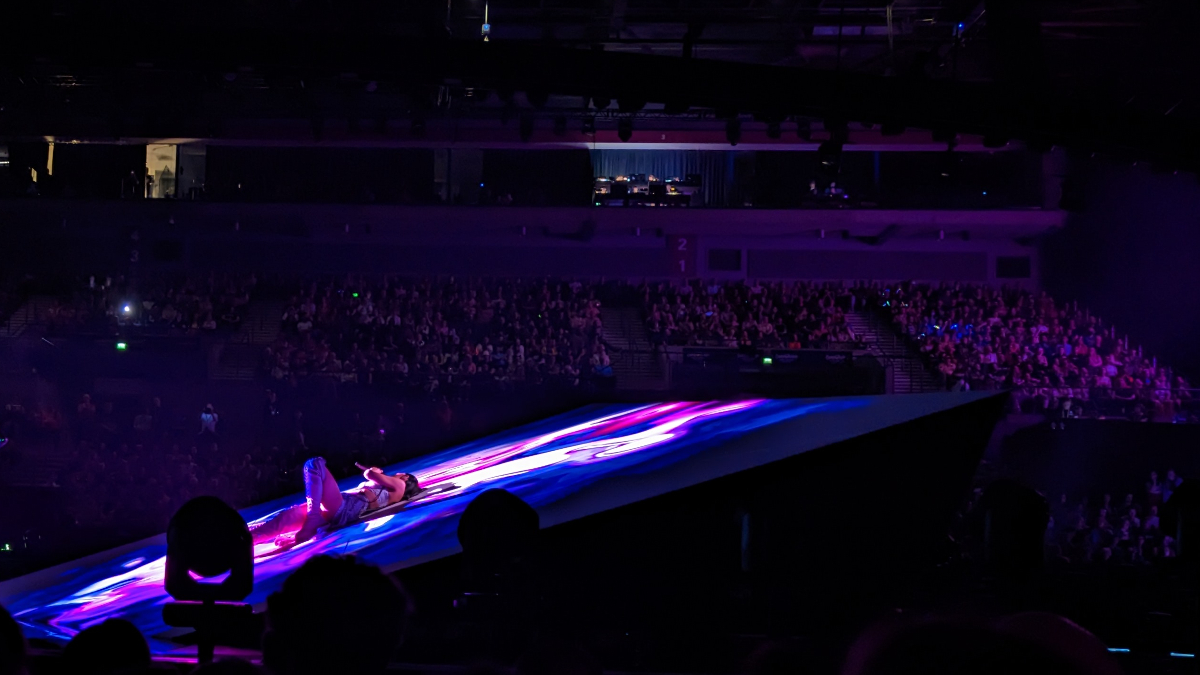
Brunette during a rehearsal before the second semi-final

Brunette took part in technical rehearsals on 1 and 4 May, followed by dress rehearsals on 10 and 11 May. This included the jury show on 10 May where the professional back-up juries of each country watched and voted in a result used if any issues with public televoting occurred.

The Armenian performance featured marble effect pink and blue LED's on the floor, whilst Brunette was positioned on a large platform for the majority of the performance. Brunette's costume was designed by Narek Jhangiryan and alluded to the Mother Armenia monument in Yerevan. Jhangiryan stated that "I drew inspiration from one of the most iconic landmarks in Yerevan - the Mother Armenia statue. This powerful metallic sculpture of a woman can be seen as you enter the city centre and symbolises the strength, power and beauty of Armenian women. My dress is a modern representation of this remarkable statue, designed to pay homage to the enduring spirit of Armenian women". For the performance, the Armenian delegation also included a dance break to the song, altering the original version of "Future Lover".

At the end of the show, Armenia was announced as having finished in the top 10 and subsequently qualifying for the grand final, marking a second consecutive Armenian qualification to the final. It was later revealed that Armenia placed sixth out of the sixteen participating countries in the second semi-final with 99 points.

=== Final ===
Shortly after the second semi-final, a winners' press conference was held for the ten qualifying countries. As part of this press conference, the qualifying artists took part in a draw to determine which half of the grand final they would subsequently participate in. This draw was done in the order the countries appeared in the semi-final running order. Armenia was drawn to compete in the second half. Following this draw, the shows' producers decided upon the running order of the final, as they had done for the semi-finals. Armenia was subsequently placed to perform in position number 17, following the entry from Belgium and before the entry from Moldova.

Brunette once again took part in dress rehearsals on 12 and 13 May before the final, including the jury final where the professional juries cast their final votes before the live show on 12 May. She performed a repeat of their semi-final performance during the final on 13 May. Armenia placed 14th in the final, scoring 122 points; 53 points from the public televoting and 69 points from the juries.

=== Voting ===
Below is a breakdown of points awarded to Armenia in the second semi-final and in the final. Voting during the three shows involved each country awarding sets of points from 1-8, 10 and 12: one from their professional jury and the other from televoting in the final vote, while the semi-final vote was based entirely on the vote of the public. The exact composition of the professional jury, and the results of each country's jury and televoting were released after the final. The Armenian jury consisted of Arsen Grigoryan, David Badalyan, Hrach Keshishyan, Vahagn Gevorgyan and Sona Rubenyan. In the second semi-final, Armenia placed 6th with 99 points, receiving maximum twelve points from Belgium and Georgia. In the final, Armenia placed 14th with 122 points, receiving twelve points in the televote from France and Georgia. Over the course of the contest, Armenia awarded its 12 points to Georgia in the second semi-final, and to Israel in both the jury and televote of the final.

==== Points awarded to Armenia ====
Points awarded to Armenia (Semi-final 2)
Score	Televote
12 points	Belgium; Georgia
10 points	Cyprus; Rest of the World; Spain
8 points	Albania; Greece
7 points	
6 points	Romania
5 points	Poland
4 points	Austria; San Marino (Note: San Marino uses a jury in the semi-finals.)
3 points	Estonia; Ukraine
2 points	Australia
1 point	Lithuania; Slovenia

Points awarded to Armenia (Final)
Score	Televote	Jury
12 points	France; Georgia	
10 points		Albania; Georgia
8 points	Rest of the World	Czech Republic
7 points		France
6 points	Belgium	Ireland
5 points		Italy; Switzerland
4 points	Cyprus	Cyprus
3 points	Israel	Estonia; Spain; United Kingdom
2 points	Czech Republic; Greece; Moldova; Spain	Moldova
1 point		Austria; Latvia; Poland

==== Points awarded by Armenia ====
Points awarded by Armenia (Semi-final 2)
Score	Televote
12 points	Georgia
10 points	Cyprus
8 points	Poland
7 points	Albania
6 points	Estonia
5 points	Slovenia
4 points	Australia
3 points	Austria
2 points	Greece
1 point	Belgium

Points awarded by Armenia (Final)
Score	Televote	Jury
12 points	Israel	Israel
10 points	France	Sweden
8 points	Cyprus	Finland
7 points	Sweden	France
6 points	Finland	Spain
5 points	Poland	Cyprus
4 points	Norway	Norway
3 points	Italy	Ukraine
2 points	Switzerland	Austria
1 point	Ukraine	Poland

==== Detailed voting results ====
Each nation's jury consisted of five music industry professionals who are citizens of the country they represent, with their names published before the contest to ensure transparency. This jury judged each entry based on: vocal capacity; the stage performance; the song's composition and originality; and the overall impression by the act. In addition, no member of a national jury was permitted to be related in any way to any of the competing acts in such a way that they cannot vote impartially and independently. The individual rankings of each jury member as well as the nation's televoting results were released shortly after the grand final.

The following members comprised the Armenian jury:

- Arsen Grigoryan – actor, singer
- David Badalyan – singer-songwriter, producer
- Hrach Keshishyan – film director, producer
- Vahagn Gevorgyan – songwriter, producer
- Sona Rubenyan – singer-songwriter

Detailed voting results from Armenia (Semi-final 2)
R/O	Country	Televote	
R/O	Country	Rank	Points
01	Denmark	13	
02	Armenia		
03	Romania	15	
04	Estonia	5	6
05	Belgium	10	1
06	Cyprus	2	10
07	Iceland	11	
08	Greece	9	2
09	Poland	3	8
10	Slovenia	6	5
11	Georgia	1	12
12	San Marino	14	
13	Austria	8	3
14	Albania	4	7
15	Lithuania	12	
16	Australia	7	4

Detailed voting results from Armenia (Final)
R/O	Country	Jury							Televote	
R/O	Country	Juror 1	Juror 2	Juror 3	Juror 4	Juror 5	Rank	Points	Rank	Points
01	Austria	4	8	18	9	20	9	2	20	
02	Portugal	11	12	23	11	24	18		21	
03	Switzerland	18	17	22	19	21	23		9	2
04	Poland	12	9	17	12	7	10	1	6	5
05	Serbia	8	13	24	18	23	19		25	
06	France	9	10	6	3	3	4	7	2	10
07	Cyprus	6	7	9	7	6	6	5	3	8
08	Spain	5	3	11	6	12	5	6	16	
09	Sweden	2	2	3	5	2	2	10	4	7
10	Albania	25	25	25	25	25	25		15	
11	Italy	13	19	5	10	19	11		8	3
12	Estonia	14	11	15	20	5	12		14	
13	Finland	1	5	2	1	9	3	8	5	6
14	Czech Republic	20	21	4	13	22	13		19	
15	Australia	16	18	7	16	18	15		24	
16	Belgium	19	16	12	23	17	20		18	
17	Armenia									
18	Moldova	22	15	16	22	16	22		13	
19	Ukraine	15	4	13	14	4	8	3	10	1
20	Norway	7	6	14	4	10	7	4	7	4
21	Germany	23	20	19	15	13	21		17	
22	Lithuania	21	22	10	21	8	16		22	
23	Israel	3	1	1	2	1	1	12	1	12
24	Slovenia	10	14	21	17	11	17		11	
25	Croatia	24	24	20	24	15	24		23	
26	United Kingdom	17	23	8	8	14	14		12	
