= Australia in the Eurovision Song Contest 2023 =

- Eurovision Song Contest 2023
- Participating broadcaster: Special Broadcasting Service (SBS)
- Country: Australia
- Selection process: Internal selection
- Announcement date: 21 February 2023

Competing entry
- Song: "Promise"
- Artist: Voyager
- Songwriters: Alex Canion; Ashley Doodkorte; Daniel Estrin; Scott Kay; Simone Dow

Placement
- Semi-final result: Qualified (1st, 149 points)
- Final result: 9th, 151 points

Participation chronology

Australia was represented at the Eurovision Song Contest 2023 with the song "Promise", written by Alex Canion, Ashley Doodkorte, Daniel Estrin, Scott Kay, and Simone Dow, and performed by themselves as Voyager. The Australian participating broadcaster, Special Broadcasting Service (SBS), internally selected its entry for the contest. SBS officially revealed the song and artist on 21 February 2023.

Australia debuted in the Eurovision Song Contest in 2015 by invitation from the European Broadcasting Union (EBU) as a "one-off" special guest to celebrate the 60th anniversary of Eurovision. On 17 November 2015, the EBU announced that SBS had been invited to participate in the 2016 contest and that Australia would once again take part. In 2015, Australia was guaranteed a spot in the final of the contest and was allowed to vote during both semi-finals and the final; however, from the 2016 contest and onwards, Australia would have to qualify to the final from one of two semi-finals and could only vote in the semi-final in which the nation was allocated to compete.

Australia was drawn to compete in the second semi-final of the Eurovision Song Contest which took place on 11 May 2023. In the semi-final, Australia qualified for the final on 13 May.

== Background ==
Special Broadcasting Service (SBS) has broadcast the Eurovision Song Contest since 1983, and the contest has gained a cult following over that time, primarily due to the country's strong political and cultural ties with Europe. Paying tribute to this, the 2014 contest semi-finals included an interval act featuring Australian singer Jessica Mauboy. Australian singers have also participated at Eurovision as representatives of other countries, including Olivia Newton-John (1974, United Kingdom), two-time winner Johnny Logan (1980 and 1987, Ireland), Gina G (1996, United Kingdom), and Jane Comerford as lead singer of Texas Lightning (2006, Germany).

Tying in with the goal of Eurovision – to showcase "the importance of bringing countries together to celebrate diversity, music and culture", the 2015 theme of "Building Bridges", and arguing that they could not hold "the world's biggest party" to celebrate the 60th edition of Eurovision without inviting Australia, the EBU announced on 10 February 2015 that the country would compete at that year's edition as a special guest participant. Along with the "Big 5" (France, Germany, Italy, Spain and the United Kingdom), and the host country of Austria, Australia was given automatic entry into the final to "not reduce the chances" of the semi-final participants. On 17 November 2015, the EBU announced that SBS had been invited to participate in the 2016 contest and that Australia would once again take part, however they would have to qualify for the final from one of two semi-finals and could only vote in the semi-final in which the nation was competing. On 12 February 2019, SBS signed a contract securing Australia's spot at the contest until 2023. In 2022, Australia was represented by Sheldon Riley and the song "Not the Same". The country ended in fifteenth place in the final with 125 points. On 20 October 2022, SBS confirmed Australia's participation in the 2023 contest.

== Before Eurovision ==
=== Internal selection ===
SBS announced in November 2022 that the Australian entry for the Eurovision Song Contest 2023 would be selected internally, foregoing the use of the national final Eurovision – Australia Decides which had been held since 2019, stating: "Over the past few months, we have been exploring ways we could deliver the event to Australian audiences next year. However, a variety of factors contributed to us coming to this decision." Australia's creative director, Paul Clarke, mentioned during an interview: "Eurovision – Australia Decides comes together as a result of different layers of funding. Some of those changed and we just fell a bit short. Unfortunately, we ran out of runway."

On 21 February 2023, SBS revealed that the band Voyager was selected as the Australian entrant for the 2023 contest with their song "Promise". The band had finished runner-up in Eurovision – Australia Decides the year prior with the song "Dreamer".

== At Eurovision ==
According to Eurovision rules, all nations with the exceptions of the host country and the "Big Five" (France, Germany, Italy, Spain and the United Kingdom) are required to qualify from one of two semi-finals in order to compete for the final; the top ten countries from each semi-final progress to the final. The European Broadcasting Union (EBU) split up the competing countries into six different pots based on voting patterns from previous contests, with countries with favourable voting histories put into the same pot. On 31 January 2023, an allocation draw was held, which placed each country into one of the two semi-finals, and determined which half of the show they would perform in. Australia has been placed into the second semi-final, to be held on 11 May 2023, and has been scheduled to perform in the second half of the show.

Once all the competing songs for the 2023 contest had been released, the running order for the semi-finals was decided by the shows' producers rather than through another draw, so that similar songs were not placed next to each other. Australia was set to perform last in position 16, following the entry from Lithuania.

At the end of the show, Australia was announced as a qualifier for the final, winning the semi-final with 149 points in total.

All three shows were broadcast on SBS with commentary by Myf Warhurst and Joel Creasey. In addition to the three shows being broadcast live in Australia at 05:00 AEST, SBS also provided repeat broadcasts at prime time on 12, 13 and 14 May at 19:30 AEST (09:30 UTC).

The prime time repeat of the first semi-final on 12 May reached a total of 191,000 viewers, while the repeat airing of the second semi-final on 13 May, which featured the participation of Australia, gained 236,000 viewers. The live broadcast of the grand final on the morning of 14 May Australia time gained an audience of 202,000 viewers, with the winner's announcement at approximately 09:00 AEST reaching 299,000 viewers. The prime time repeat of the final that evening reached a total of 181,000 viewers.

=== Voting ===
==== Points awarded to Australia ====
Points awarded to Australia (Semi-final)
Score	Televote
12 points	Albania; Estonia; Iceland
10 points	Denmark; Romania
8 points	Austria; Lithuania; Poland; United Kingdom
7 points	Cyprus; Georgia; Rest of the World; Spain; Ukraine
6 points	Belgium; San Marino (Note: San Marino uses a jury in the semi-finals.); Slovenia
5 points	
4 points	Armenia; Greece
3 points	
2 points	
1 point	

Points awarded to Australia (Final)
Score	Televote	Jury
12 points		Portugal; Iceland
10 points		United Kingdom
8 points	Finland	Cyprus; Estonia; Germany; Ukraine
7 points		Czech Republic
6 points	Estonia	
5 points		Azerbaijan; Greece; Moldova; Norway; San Marino
4 points		Belgium; Ireland; Lithuania; Poland; Slovenia
3 points	Iceland	Albania; Romania
2 points	United Kingdom	Denmark; Georgia; Switzerland
1 point	Netherlands; Sweden	

==== Points awarded by Australia ====
Points awarded by Australia (Semi-final)
Score	Televote
12 points	Austria
10 points	Cyprus
8 points	Slovenia
7 points	Belgium
6 points	Lithuania
5 points	Iceland
4 points	Estonia
3 points	Albania
2 points	Armenia
1 point	Georgia

Points awarded by Australia (Final)
Score	Televote	Jury
12 points	Finland	Belgium
10 points	Sweden	Lithuania
8 points	Cyprus	Estonia
7 points	Austria	Sweden
6 points	Norway	Austria
5 points	Israel	Finland
4 points	Croatia	Spain
3 points	Belgium	Cyprus
2 points	France	Portugal
1 point	Slovenia	Italy

==== Detailed voting results ====
The following members comprised the Australian jury:

- Andrew Farriss
- Eddie Perfect
- Latifa Shabaz Tasipale (Latifa Tee)
- Toni Pearen
- Brihony Dawson

Detailed voting results from Australia (Semi-final 2)
R/O	Country	Televote	
R/O	Country	Rank	Points
01	Denmark	12	
02	Armenia	9	2
03	Romania	15	
04	Estonia	7	4
05	Belgium	4	7
06	Cyprus	2	10
07	Iceland	6	5
08	Greece	13	
09	Poland	11	
10	Slovenia	3	8
11	Georgia	10	1
12	San Marino	14	
13	Austria	1	12
14	Albania	8	3
15	Lithuania	5	6
16	Australia		

Detailed voting results from Australia (Final)
R/O	Country	Jury							Televote	
R/O	Country	Juror 1	Juror 2	Juror 3	Juror 4	Juror 5	Rank	Points	Rank	Points
01	Austria	7	3	4	7	6	5	6	4	7
02	Portugal	16	18	7	4	13	9	2	19	
03	Switzerland	20	16	18	12	19	21		22	
04	Poland	17	14	16	11	12	17		24	
05	Serbia	24	25	23	17	23	25		18	
06	France	10	19	22	5	17	12		9	2
07	Cyprus	19	9	11	6	4	8	3	3	8
08	Spain	4	24	5	16	7	7	4	21	
09	Sweden	11	4	3	15	1	4	7	2	10
10	Albania	15	10	13	13	18	16		25	
11	Italy	6	11	15	9	20	10	1	13	
12	Estonia	2	13	2	1	8	3	8	20	
13	Finland	5	5	6	8	10	6	5	1	12
14	Czech Republic	13	20	17	19	22	23		12	
15	Australia									
16	Belgium	1	1	1	3	2	1	12	8	3
17	Armenia	14	17	10	22	15	20		23	
18	Moldova	25	15	21	18	25	24		17	
19	Ukraine	18	22	20	21	5	15		16	
20	Norway	23	23	12	20	14	22		5	6
21	Germany	12	8	25	23	24	18		11	
22	Lithuania	3	2	8	2	3	2	10	15	
23	Israel	21	7	9	25	9	11		6	5
24	Slovenia	22	6	14	24	11	13		10	1
25	Croatia	9	12	24	10	16	14		7	4
26	United Kingdom	8	21	19	14	21	19		14	
