= Stay (Monika Linkytė song) =

2023 single by Monika Linkytė

Single by Monika Linkytė

from the EP Healing
- Released: 14 February 2023
- Length: 3:04 (Original version); 2:57 (Eurovision version)
- Label: Creative Industries
- Songwriters: Monika Linkytė; Krists Indrišonoks
- Producers: Krists Indrišonoks; Jānis Jačmenkins

Monika Linkytė singles chronology
| "Degtukas" (2022) | "Stay" (2023) |

Music video
- "Stay" on YouTube

Eurovision Song Contest 2023 entry
- Country: Lithuania
- Artist: Monika Linkytė
- Languages: English, Lithuanian
- Composers: Monika Linkytė; Krists Indrišonoks
- Lyricists: Monika Linkytė; Krists Indrišonoks

Finals performance
- Semi-final result: 4th
- Semi-final points: 110
- Final result: 11th
- Final points: 127

Entry chronology
- ◄ "Sentimentai" (2022)
- "Luktelk" (2024) ►

Official performance video
- "Stay" (Second Semi-Final) on YouTube "Stay" (Grand Final) on YouTube

"Stay", also known as "Stay – Čiūto tūto", is a song by Lithuanian singer Monika Linkytė, released on 14 February 2023. The song represented Lithuania in the Eurovision Song Contest 2023 after winning Pabandom iš naujo! 2023, Lithuania's national selection for that year's Eurovision Song Contest. It peaked at number five in Linkytė's home country of Lithuania.

== Background and composition ==
In press statements to Lithuanian National Radio and Television (LRT), Monika reported that she and Latvian songwriter Chris Noah had written "Stay" during an unplanned writing session. According to Monika, she wanted to write about "how important it is to pause and come back to yourself." Some lines in the song relate to Lithuanian folk sutras, speaking about a yearning to hear the voice of "our heart more and more."

The song's use of musical elements found in sutartinės revived national interest in the art form, leading Seimas to introduce a national day of sutartinės on November 16, the day on which sutartinės were added to the UNESCO Intangible Cultural Heritage Lists in 2010. The proposal to amend the list of national memorial days, submitted by Robertas Šarknickas, was supported by 98 members of the parliament, opposed by 2, and abstained from by 12.

== Eurovision Song Contest ==
=== Pabandom iš naujo! 2023 ===
Pabandom iš naujo! 2023 ("Let's try again! 2023") is the national final format LRT developed to select Lithuania's entry for the Eurovision Song Contest 2023. For the 2023 competition, two heats consisting of fifteen entries each were held on 21 and 28 January, where five entries from each heat were eliminated, while the remaining twenty entries participated in the competition's two semi-finals, taking place on 4 and 11 February. In each semi-final, ten entries participated and the top five proceeded to the final. The winner would be selected from the remaining ten entries in the final. The results of each of the six shows were determined by the 50/50 combination of votes from a jury panel and public televoting.

"Stay" was chosen to compete in the second heat, qualifying by finishing second out of 15 entries in the heat. In the second semi-final, the song performed fifth, finishing third, and qualifying for the contest's grand final. In the final, the song received 12 points from the juries and 10 points from televoting, earning 22 points. The song tied with Rūta Mur's song "So Low"; however, as "Stay" earned a higher jury score, it won the competition and the Lithuanian spot for the Eurovision Song Contest 2023.

=== At Eurovision ===
According to Eurovision rules, all nations with the exceptions of the host country and the "Big Five" (France, Germany, Italy, Spain and the United Kingdom) are required to qualify from one of two semi-finals to compete for the final; the top ten countries from each semi-final progress to the final. The European Broadcasting Union (EBU) split the competing countries into six different pots based on voting patterns from previous contests, with countries with favourable voting histories put into the same pot. On 31 January 2023, an allocation draw was held, which placed each country into one of the two semi-finals, and determined which half of the show they would perform in. Lithuania has been placed into the second semi-final, to be held on 11 May 2023, and has been scheduled to perform in the show's second half.

== Charts ==
Chart performance for "Stay"
| Chart (2023) | Peak position |
|---|---|
| Lithuania (AGATA) | 5 |
| UK Singles Downloads (OCC) | 45 |
