= Austria in the Eurovision Song Contest 2023 =

- Eurovision Song Contest 2023
- Participating broadcaster: Österreichischer Rundfunk (ORF)
- Country: Austria
- Selection process: Internal selection
- Announcement date: Artist: 31 January 2023; Song: 8 March 2023

Competing entry
- Song: "Who the Hell Is Edgar?"
- Artist: Teya and Salena
- Songwriters: Teodora Špirić; Selina-Maria Edbauer; Ronald Janeček; Pele Loriano

Placement
- Semi-final result: Qualified (2nd, 137 points)
- Final result: 15th, 120 points

Participation chronology

Austria was represented at the Eurovision Song Contest 2023 with the song "Who the Hell Is Edgar?", written by Teodora Špirić, Selina-Maria Edbauer, Ronald Janeček, and Pele Loriano, and performed by Špirić and Edbauer themselves under their stage names Teya and Salena. The Austrian participating broadcaster Österreichischer Rundfunk (ORF) internally selected its entry for the contest. Teya and Salena were announced as the Austrian representatives on 31 January 2023, while their song was presented to the public on 8 March 2023.

Austria was drawn to compete in the second semi-final of the Eurovision Song Contest which took place on 11 May 2023. Performing during the show in position 13, "Who The Hell Is Edgar?" was announced among the top 10 entries of the second semi-final and therefore qualified to compete in the final, marking Austria's first qualification to the grand final since 2018. It was later revealed that Austria placed 2nd out of the 16 participating countries in the semi-final with 137 points. Performing in position 1 in the final on 13 May 2023, Austria finished in fifteenth place overall with 120 points.

== Background ==
Prior to the 2023 contest, Österreichischer Rundfunk (ORF) had participated in the Eurovision Song Contest fifty-four times since its first entry in 1957. It has won the contest on two occasions: in 1966 with the song "Merci, Chérie" performed by Udo Jürgens and in 2014 with the song "Rise Like a Phoenix" performed by Conchita Wurst. Following the introduction of semi-finals for the 2004 contest, Austria has featured in only seven finals. Its least successful result has been last place, which they have achieved on eight occasions, most recently in 2012. It has also received nul points on four occasions; in 1962, 1988, 1991 and 2015.

As part of its duties as participating broadcaster, ORF organises the selection of its entry in the Eurovision Song Contest and broadcasts the event in the country. ORF confirmed their intentions to participate at the 2023 contest on 9 June 2022. From 2011 to 2013 as well as in 2015 and 2016, ORF set up national finals with several artists to choose both the song and performer to compete at Eurovision for Austria, with both the public and a panel of jury members involved in the selection. In 2014 and since 2017, ORF has held an internal selection to choose the artist and song.

== Before Eurovision ==
=== Internal selection ===
Artists were nominated by ORF's Eurovision team, which collaborated with producer Lukas Hillebrand and music expert Eberhard Forcher who worked on the selection of the Austrian entries since 2016, to submit songs to the broadcaster. In November 2022, it was reported by Austrian media that 15 artists, including singers Julian le Play and Slomo, were involved in the selection and that the Austrian entry would be selected by a panel of ORF entertainment editors together with the broadcaster's programme director Stefanie Groiss-Horowitz and entertainment director Alexander Hofer, after three entries had been shortlisted by a previous panel of 25 local and international music industry and Eurovision experts as well as Eurovision fans following a live casting round which took place on 30 October 2022.

On 31 January 2023, ORF announced during the radio show Ö3-Wecker, aired on Ö3, that they had internally selected Teodora Špirić (Teya) and Selina-Maria Edbauer (Salena) to represent Austria in Liverpool. Teya had previously attempted to represent Serbia at the Eurovision Song Contest in 2020, placing tenth in the national final Beovizija 2020 with the song "Sudnji dan", while Salena had previously been a participant in the seventh season of The Voice of Germany in 2017, where she reached the third round as a member of Samu Haber's team. Both singers also previously attempted to represent Austria at the Eurovision Song Contest; Teya in 2020 with an English version of "Sudnji dan" entitled "Judgement Day" and Salena in 2019 with the song "Behind the Waterfall". The song "Who the Hell Is Edgar?", written by Teya and Salena together with Ronald Janeček and Pele Loriano at a songwriting camp in the Czech Republic, was presented as the Austrian entry for the contest on 8 March 2023 during Ö3-Wecker.

"This song is a snapshot of the fun we had on the day we wrote it. It started with wanting to convey what it feels like when a good song is made. Sometimes creativity rushes through you as if you‘re getting possessed by a ghost. But we also wanted to put our personal experiences as female songwriters into the song. It often feels like you have to prove yourself over and over again to be taken seriously. By presenting Edgar Allan Poe as the actual writer of the song, we want to draw attention to this frustrating part of the music business. It's satire."

— Teya and Salena about "Who the Hell Is Edgar?"

== At Eurovision ==
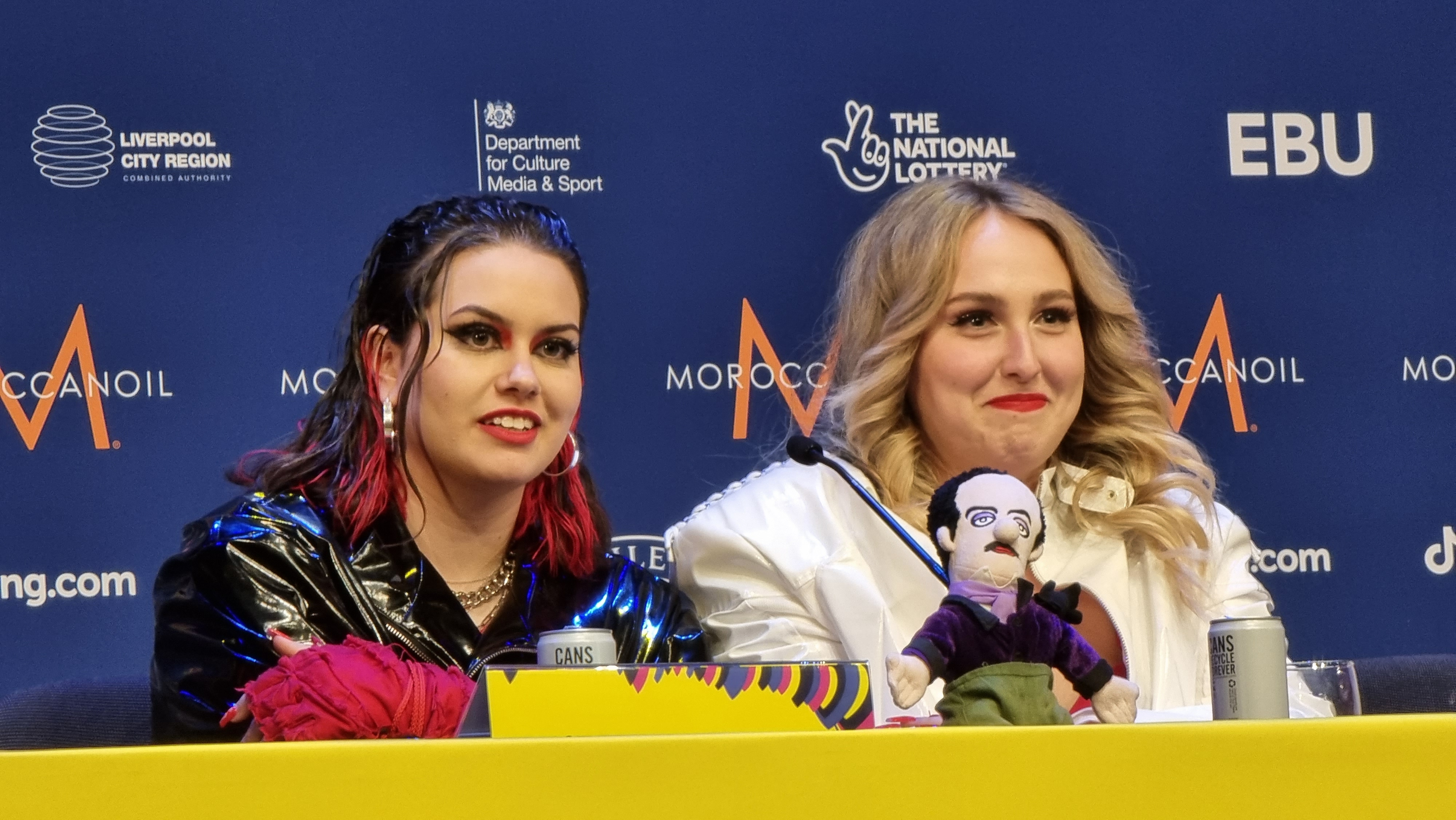
Teya and Salena at a press conference for the Eurovision Song Contest 2023

According to Eurovision rules, all nations with the exceptions of the host country and the "Big Five" (France, Germany, Italy, Spain and the United Kingdom) are required to qualify from one of two semi-finals in order to compete for the final; the top ten countries from each semi-final progress to the final. The European Broadcasting Union (EBU) split up the competing countries into six different pots based on voting patterns from previous contests, with countries with favourable voting histories put into the same pot. On 31 January 2023, an allocation draw was held, which placed each country into one of the two semi-finals, and determined which half of the show they would perform in. Austria has been placed into the second semi-final, to be held on 11 May 2023, and has been scheduled to perform in the second half of the show.

Once all the competing songs for the 2023 contest had been released, the running order for the semi-finals was decided by the shows' producers rather than through another draw, so that similar songs were not placed next to each other. Austria was set to perform in position 13, following the entry from San Marino and before the entry from Albania.

In Austria, all shows were broadcast on ORF 1, with commentary by Andi Knoll, with final broadcast on FM4, with commentary by Jan Böhmermann and Olli Schulz. ORF also provided additional programming alongside the live broadcast of the contest shows, with the two-part pre-recorded series "Mr. Song Contest Proudly Presents" fronted by Knoll, which aired prior to the two semi-finals, and two live broadcasts from the Tate Liverpool, "ESC – Der Countdown" and "ESC – Die Aftershow", conducted as a joint broadcast on ORF, Germany's ARD and Switzerland's SRF which aired prior to and after the final and was presented by Barbara Schöneberger. ORF appointed Philipp Hansa as its spokesperson to announce the top 12-point score awarded by the Austrian jury during the final.

At the end of the show, Austria was announced as a qualifier for the final.

The semi-final 1 broadcast on 9 May reached a total of 306,000 Austrian viewers, which represented a 16.5% market share. The semi-final 2 broadcast on 11 May, which included the participation of Austria, reached 568,000 viewers (23.1% market share). The broadcast of the final on 13 May was watched by an average of 1,079,000 viewers, representing a 47% market share, with a peak viewership of 1,230,000 at a given point during the broadcast on ORF 1. This marked Austria's best viewership figures for the contest since 2016, as well as all-time high viewing figures among the 12-49 and 12-29 target groups.

=== Voting ===
==== Points awarded to Austria ====
Points awarded to Austria (Semi-final)
Score	Televote
12 points	Australia
10 points	Albania; Belgium; Poland; Slovenia
8 points	Iceland; Rest of the World; San Marino (Note: San Marino uses a jury in the semi-finals.)
7 points	Romania; United Kingdom
6 points	Denmark; Estonia; Greece; Lithuania; Spain
5 points	Cyprus; Ukraine
4 points	Georgia
3 points	Armenia
2 points	
1 point	

Points awarded to Austria (Final)
Score	Televote	Jury
12 points		Belgium
10 points		Cyprus; France
8 points		Iceland; Lithuania
7 points	Australia	Denmark; Greece; Switzerland
6 points		Australia; Israel; San Marino; Serbia
5 points		
4 points	Netherlands	
3 points	Serbia	Slovenia
2 points	Finland	Armenia; Finland; Germany
1 point		Malta; Netherlands

==== Points awarded by Austria ====
Points awarded by Austria (Semi-final)
Score	Televote
12 points	Belgium
10 points	Slovenia
8 points	Australia
7 points	Poland
6 points	Albania
5 points	Lithuania
4 points	Armenia
3 points	Estonia
2 points	Cyprus
1 point	Iceland

Points awarded by Austria (Final)
Score	Televote	Jury
12 points	Finland	Italy
10 points	Croatia	Sweden
8 points	Italy	Finland
7 points	Norway	Lithuania
6 points	Germany	Slovenia
5 points	Ukraine	Czech Republic
4 points	Sweden	Switzerland
3 points	Albania	Belgium
2 points	Switzerland	Cyprus
1 point	Israel	Armenia

==== Detailed voting results ====
The following members comprised the Austrian jury:

- Christian Andreas Ude
- Peter Schreiber
- Thomas Traint
- Elke Kaufmann
- Alica Ouschan

Detailed voting results from Austria (Semi-final 2)
R/O	Country	Televote	
R/O	Country	Rank	Points
01	Denmark	14	
02	Armenia	7	4
03	Romania	12	
04	Estonia	8	3
05	Belgium	1	12
06	Cyprus	9	2
07	Iceland	10	1
08	Greece	11	
09	Poland	4	7
10	Slovenia	2	10
11	Georgia	13	
12	San Marino	15	
13	Austria		
14	Albania	5	6
15	Lithuania	6	5
16	Australia	3	8

Detailed voting results from Austria (Final)
R/O	Country	Jury							Televote	
R/O	Country	Juror 1	Juror 2	Juror 3	Juror 4	Juror 5	Rank	Points	Rank	Points
01	Austria									
02	Portugal	16	23	10	13	10	19		23	
03	Switzerland	8	11	2	6	14	7	4	9	2
04	Poland	11	24	16	8	9	18		13	
05	Serbia	3	10	24	16	24	14		15	
06	France	24	22	13	20	11	22		18	
07	Cyprus	17	18	6	3	12	9	2	20	
08	Spain	6	17	9	17	17	17		24	
09	Sweden	9	1	4	5	8	2	10	7	4
10	Albania	20	25	14	10	23	21		8	3
11	Italy	19	6	5	2	1	1	12	3	8
12	Estonia	22	21	11	7	4	11		19	
13	Finland	2	4	1	19	22	3	8	1	12
14	Czech Republic	1	2	19	22	19	6	5	12	
15	Australia	13	5	18	11	21	15		17	
16	Belgium	18	3	20	12	5	8	3	11	
17	Armenia	14	8	3	14	13	10	1	22	
18	Moldova	25	19	15	18	18	23		16	
19	Ukraine	7	12	17	15	6	13		6	5
20	Norway	10	13	22	23	20	20		4	7
21	Germany	21	16	25	24	25	25		5	6
22	Lithuania	12	7	8	1	3	4	7	21	
23	Israel	15	14	7	9	16	16		10	1
24	Slovenia	5	9	12	4	2	5	6	14	
25	Croatia	4	20	23	21	7	12		2	10
26	United Kingdom	23	15	21	25	15	24		25	
