= Cyprus in the Eurovision Song Contest 2023 =

- Eurovision Song Contest 2023
- Participating broadcaster: Cyprus Broadcasting Corporation (CyBC)
- Country: Cyprus
- Selection process: Internal selection
- Announcement date: Artist: 17 October 2022; Song: 2 March 2023

Competing entry
- Song: "Break a Broken Heart"
- Artist: Andrew Lambrou
- Songwriters: Thomas Stengaard; Jimmy "Joker" Thörnfeldt; Jimmy Jansson; Marcus Winther-John

Placement
- Semi-final result: Qualified (7th, 96 points)
- Final result: 12th, 126 points

Participation chronology

Cyprus was represented at the Eurovision Song Contest 2023 with the song "Break a Broken Heart", written by Thomas Stengaard, Jimmy "Joker" Thörnfeldt, Jimmy Jansson, Marcus Winther-John, and performed by Andrew Lambrou. The Cypriot participating broadcaster, Cyprus Broadcasting Corporation (CyBC), internally selected its entry for the contest.

In the second semi-final, Cyprus qualified for the final on 13 May.

== Background ==
Prior to the 2023 contest, the Cyprus Broadcasting Corporation (CyBC) had participated in the Eurovision Song Contest representing Cyprus 38 times since its debut in the 1981 contest. Its best placing was at the 2018 contest where "Fuego" performed by Eleni Foureira placed second. Before that, its best result was fifth, achieved three times: in 1982 with the song "Mono i agapi" performed by Anna Vissi, in 1997 with "Mana mou" performed by Hara and Andreas Constantinou, and in 2004 with "Stronger Every Minute" performed by Lisa Andreas. Its least successful result was in 1986 when it placed last with the song "Tora zo" by Elpida, receiving only four points in total. However, its worst finish in terms of points received was when it placed second to last in 1999 with "Tha 'nai erotas" by Marlain Angelidou, receiving only two points. After returning to the contest in 2015 following its absence in 2014 due to the 2012–13 Cypriot financial crisis and the broadcaster's budget restrictions, Cyprus has qualified for the final of all the contests until 2022, when "Ela" performed by Andromache failed to advance from the semi-finals.

As part of its duties as participating broadcaster, CyBC organises the selection of its entry in the Eurovision Song Contest and broadcasts the event in the country. The broadcaster has used various methods to select its entry in the past, such as internal selections and televised national finals to choose the performer, song or both to compete at Eurovision. In 2015, CyBC organised the national final Eurovision Song Project, which featured 54 songs competing in a nine-week-long process resulting in the selection of its entry through the combination of public televoting and the votes from an expert jury. Since 2016, however, the broadcaster has opted to select the entry internally without input from the public. On 28 May 2022, it was reported by OGAE Greece that the label Panik Records had signed an agreement with CyBC in order to select the Cypriot artist for 2023 through a Greek-Cypriot talent show based on the British reality television music competition All Together Now. However, such plans were pushed back to 2024, with the broadcaster reverting to an internal selection.

== Before Eurovision ==
=== Internal selection ===
CyBC continued to internally select its entry for the Eurovision Song Contest 2023, in conjunction with Panik Records. On 17 October 2022, CyBC announced that they had selected Australian-Cypriot singer Andrew Lambrou to represent Cyprus. Lambrou had previously attempted to represent Australia in 2022, placing seventh in the national final Eurovision – Australia Decides 2022 with the song "Electrify". His entry, "Break a Broken Heart", was released on 2 March 2023.

== At Eurovision ==
According to Eurovision rules, all nations with the exceptions of the host country and the "Big Five" (France, Germany, Italy, Spain and the United Kingdom) are required to qualify from one of two semi-finals in order to compete for the final; the top ten countries from each semi-final progress to the final. The European Broadcasting Union (EBU) split up the competing countries into six different pots based on voting patterns from previous contests, with countries with favourable voting histories put into the same pot. On 31 January 2023, an allocation draw was held, which placed each country into one of the two semi-finals, and determined which half of the show they would perform in. Cyprus has been placed into the second semi-final, to be held on 11 May 2023, and has been scheduled to perform in the first half of the show.

Once all the competing songs for the 2023 contest had been released, the running order for the semi-finals was decided by the shows' producers rather than through another draw, so that similar songs were not placed next to each other. Cyprus was set to perform in position 6, following the entry from Belgium and before the entry from Iceland.

At the end of the show, Cyprus was announced as a qualifier for the final.

All three shows were broadcast live on RIK 1 and RIK Sat with commentary by Melina Karageorgiou and Alexandros Taramountas. The grand final broadcast on RIK 1 on 13 May reached over 139,000 viewers, which represents a 61.6% market share.

=== Voting ===
==== Points awarded to Cyprus ====
Points awarded to Cyprus (Semi-final)
Score	Televote
12 points	Greece
10 points	Armenia; Australia
8 points	
7 points	Poland
6 points	Albania
5 points	Estonia; Georgia; Iceland
4 points	Belgium; Denmark; Lithuania; Romania; Slovenia; Ukraine; United Kingdom
3 points	Spain
2 points	Austria
1 point	San Marino (Note: San Marino uses a jury in the semi-finals.)

Points awarded to Cyprus (Final)
Score	Televote	Jury
12 points	Greece	
10 points		Poland
8 points	Armenia; Australia	
7 points	Albania	Norway
6 points	Azerbaijan	Latvia; Romania
5 points	San Marino	Armenia; Denmark; Malta
4 points	Poland	Albania; Greece; Moldova
3 points	Moldova	Australia; Georgia
2 points	Denmark; Norway	Austria
1 point	Romania	Finland; Israel; Lithuania; Sweden

==== Points awarded by Cyprus ====
Points awarded by Cyprus (Semi-final)
Score	Televote
12 points	Greece
10 points	Armenia
8 points	Lithuania
7 points	Australia
6 points	Poland
5 points	Austria
4 points	Belgium
3 points	Estonia
2 points	Slovenia
1 point	Albania

Points awarded by Cyprus (Final)
Score	Televote	Jury
12 points	Israel	Sweden
10 points	Ukraine	Austria
8 points	Sweden	Australia
7 points	Finland	Israel
6 points	Italy	Spain
5 points	Norway	Italy
4 points	Armenia	Armenia
3 points	France	Finland
2 points	Poland	Switzerland
1 point	Moldova	Czech Republic

==== Detailed voting results ====
Detailed voting results from Cyprus (Semi-final 2)
R/O	Country	Televote	
R/O	Country	Rank	Points
01	Denmark	14	
02	Armenia	2	10
03	Romania	13	
04	Estonia	8	3
05	Belgium	7	4
06	Cyprus		
07	Iceland	12	
08	Greece	1	12
09	Poland	5	6
10	Slovenia	9	2
11	Georgia	11	
12	San Marino	15	
13	Austria	6	5
14	Albania	10	1
15	Lithuania	3	8
16	Australia	4	7

Detailed voting results from Cyprus (Final)
R/O	Country	Jury							Televote	
R/O	Country	Juror 1	Juror 2	Juror 3	Juror 4	Juror 5	Rank	Points	Rank	Points
01	Austria	2	3	8	2	4	2	10	19	
02	Portugal	16	17	17	15	17	19		24	
03	Switzerland	8	5	12	8	8	9	2	12	
04	Poland	20	14	20	18	22	21		9	2
05	Serbia	24	24	15	23	25	25		20	
06	France	10	19	2	17	14	11		8	3
07	Cyprus									
08	Spain	1	4	9	9	13	5	6	23	
09	Sweden	5	2	5	3	1	1	12	3	8
10	Albania	23	18	24	11	11	18		25	
11	Italy	7	11	1	10	7	6	5	5	6
12	Estonia	13	15	22	4	10	13		17	
13	Finland	4	12	4	5	24	8	3	4	7
14	Czech Republic	6	6	7	14	15	10	1	16	
15	Australia	3	1	14	7	2	3	8	22	
16	Belgium	11	13	19	12	21	16		21	
17	Armenia	14	10	11	1	6	7	4	7	4
18	Moldova	12	16	23	19	23	20		10	1
19	Ukraine	19	9	10	22	16	14		2	10
20	Norway	15	21	6	16	5	12		6	5
21	Germany	25	22	18	21	18	24		18	
22	Lithuania	17	20	25	13	9	17		11	
23	Israel	9	7	3	6	3	4	7	1	12
24	Slovenia	22	23	16	20	20	23		15	
25	Croatia	21	25	13	24	19	22		14	
26	United Kingdom	18	8	21	25	12	15		13	
