= Moldova in the Eurovision Song Contest 2023 =

- Eurovision Song Contest 2023
- Participating broadcaster: TeleRadio-Moldova (TRM)
- Country: Moldova
- Selection process: Etapa națională 2023
- Selection date: 4 March 2023

Competing entry
- Song: "Soarele și luna"
- Artist: Pasha Parfeni
- Songwriters: Pavel Parfeni; Andrei Vulpe; Iuliana Parfeni

Placement
- Semi-final result: Qualified (5th, 109 points)
- Final result: 18th, 96 points

Participation chronology

Moldova was represented at the Eurovision Song Contest 2023 with the song "Soarele și luna" written by Pavel Parfeni, Andrei Vulpe and Iuliana Parfeni. The song was performed by Pasha Parfeni, who previously represented Moldova in 2012. The Moldovan broadcaster, TeleRadio-Moldova (TRM), organised the national final Etapa Națională 2023 in order to select the Moldovan entry for the 2023 contest, with a combination of jury votes and public voting determining the winning entry.

In the first semi-final, Moldova qualified for the final on 13 May.

== Background ==
Prior to the 2023 contest, Moldova had participated in the Eurovision Song Contest 17 times since its first entry in 2005. The nation's best placing in the contest was third, which it achieved in 2017 with the song "Hey, Mamma!" performed by SunStroke Project. To this point, Moldova has achieved another four top 10 placings at the contest: in 2005 when "Boonika bate toba" performed by Zdob și Zdub placed sixth, in 2007 when "Fight" performed by Natalia Barbu placed tenth, in 2018 when "My Lucky Day" performed by DoReDoS also placed tenth, and in 2022, when Zdob și Zdub returned to compete for a third time with the song "Trenulețul", performed with the Advahov Brothers, which finished in seventh place.

The Moldovan national broadcaster, TeleRadio-Moldova (TRM), broadcasts the event within Moldova and organises the selection process for the nation's entry. TRM confirmed its intention to participate at the 2023 Eurovision Song Contest on 20 October 2022. Moldova has selected their entry via a national selection show between 2008 and 2020, while their entry in 2021 was selected via an internal selection. A selection show was to be held on 5 March 2022 to select Moldova's entry for the 2022 contest, but on 28 January 2022 it was revealed the entry would be selected during the auditions following the cancellation of the final due to COVID-19 restrictions. On 23 December 2022, TRM announced that it would hold a national final to select its entry for the 2023 contest.

== Before Eurovision ==
=== Etapa națională 2023 ===
Etapa națională 2023 was the national final format developed by TRM in order to select Moldova's entry for the Eurovision Song Contest 2023. The event took place at the TRM Studio 2 in Chișinău, hosted by Doina Stimpovschi, Ion Jalbă and Daniela Crudu, and included a final held on 4 March 2023. The show was broadcast on Moldova 1 and OUTtv as well as online via TRM's official website trm.md and Eurovision Song Contest website eurovision.md as well as the broadcaster's Facebook and YouTube pages.

==== Competing entries ====
Artists and composers had the opportunity to submit their entries between 23 December 2022 and 16 January 2023. Artists could submit more than one song, and an international act was able to compete only if they are part of a duo or group where 50% of the lead vocalists are of Moldovan nationality. At the conclusion of the submission deadline, 33 valid entries were received by the broadcaster. Among the artists that submitted a song were 2010 and 2017 Moldovan Eurovision entrants SunStroke Project, 2012 Moldovan Eurovision entrant Pasha Parfeni, and 2013 Moldovan Eurovision entrant Aliona Moon. The live audition round took place on 28 January 2023 at TRM Studio 2 in Chișinău where 10 finalists were selected to advance. The auditions were broadcast on Moldova 2 as well as online via trm.md, eurovision.md and via TRM's Facebook and YouTube pages. The jury panel that evaluated the songs during the live auditions and selected the 10 finalists consisted of Violeta Julea (performer), Ion Chiorpec (head of Radio Moldova Muzical), Vasile Advahov (musician, 2022 Moldovan Eurovision entrant), Liviu Știrbu (composer) and Daniela Crudu (journalist at Moldova 1). Entries were assessed on criteria such as the melodic line, originality and interpretation of the composition.

Prior to the auditions, TRM announced that two songs were disqualified from the competition: "Squeeze Paradise" by Nördika due to it having been published before 1 September 2022, and "In questo domani" by Massimo Sinceri feat. Da-Muse due to it violating the 50% foreign nationality rule. Dianna Rotaru, who entered under the stage name Lola, was due to compete with the song "Temperatura", but was disqualified after she was unable to attend the live audition round.

Key: Selected for final Disqualified

Results of the Live Audition Round – 28 January 2023
R/O	Artist	Song	Songwriter(s)	Points	Place
1	Formația Vele	"Jocul neamului moldovenesc"	Ivan Sparivac, Sergiu Carai	22	27
2	Corina Ivanov	"When Love's Real"	Mike Connaris, Mia Nicolai	44	10
3	Nördika	"Damn and Down"	Ruslan Țăranu	45	7
4	Nihilist & Lisa Nicky	"Final Destination"	Elizaveta Pînzari, Vladimir Bejenari	27	25
5	Victor Gulick	"Let's Dance"	Victor Gulick, Serghei Lututovici	45	8
6	Surorile Osoianu	"Bade, bădișor, bădiță"	Elena Ioniță, Jonathan Alexandru	47	6
7	OL	"Why You Play It Cool"	Olga Lisicova	48	5
8	Adelina Iordachi	"Deja Vu"	Doina Sclifos	43	11
9	Nikko T.	"Destiny"	Gloria Gorceag, Vitalie Cătană	28	22
10	Crista	"Pădure verde pădure"	Cristina Baban	43	13
11	SunStroke Project	"Yummy Mommy"	Mihai Teodor, Sergei Yalovitsky	55	1
12	Nr 11	"Adio"	Nadejda "Stetiuc" Rotaru	21	29
13	Vera	"Vremea ta"	Vera Țurcanu, Nikos Sofis	35	17
14	Sasha Bognibov	"My Favourite Schoolgirl"	Sasha Bognibov	19	30
15	Rise	"Don't Tremble"	Lidia Scarlat, Ivan Aculov	41	14
16	Ada Deea	"Mystic Rose"	Rafael Artesero, Jose Juan Santana	40	15
17	Cosmina	"Indestructible"	Cosmina Cotoros, Shawn Myers, Jonas Gladnikoff	45	9
18	Lisa Volk	"Scrisoare către țară"	Elisaveta Smirnova, Marian Stîrcea	28	23
19	Angel Kiss	"Now I Know"	Samuel Bugia Garrido, Roxana Emilia Elekes	30	21
20	Gesica Sîrbu	"I'm in Love"	Eugen Doibani	22	28
21	Aliona Moon	"Du-mă"	Ștefan Burlacu, Vlad Sabajuc, Aliona Munteanu	49	4
22	Tania Pitușcan	"Miorița"	Elad Lahmany, Tatiana Pitușcan	32	20
23	Pasha Parfeni	"Soarele și luna"	Pavel Parfeni, Andrei Vulpe, Iuliana Parfeni	53	2
24	Ricky Ardezianu	"Una rosa rossa"	Ricky Ardezianu, Ianoș Țurcanu, Ion Istrati	23	26
25	Harmony Scuffle	"Favourite One"	Lev Logvinenco, Vadim Psariov	33	19
26	Valeria Condrea	"We're Now Different"	Valeria Condrea	40	16
27	Diana Elmas	"Miracle"	Mats Larsson, Åsa Karlström, Ulf Georgsson, Martin Klaman, Ylva Persson, Linda Persson, Rickard Bonde Truumeel	34	18
28	Nino	"It Would Be Nice"	Sergiu Cristian Baba	28	24
29	Y-Limit	"Live in Harmony"	Roman Lupu, Pavel Malisev	43	12
30	Donia	"Red Zone"	Doina Ianculescu, Robert Andrei Niculae	52	3
—N/a	Lola	"Temperatura"	Eugen Doibani	—	—

==== Final ====
The final took place on 4 March 2023. 10 songs competed and the winner was selected based on the combination of a public online vote and the votes of an expert jury. The jury that voted in the final included Gabriela Tocari (General Director of Capela Corală Moldova), Vlad Constandoi (founder of Senz Music), Leonid Melnic (Chief Deputy of Telefirm Chișinău), Viorica Atanasov (vocal coach, songwriter) and Gheorghe Mustea (professor at the Academy of Music, Theatre and Fine Arts). In addition to the performances of the competing entries, 2022 Moldovan Eurovision entrants Zdob și Zdub and Advahov Brothers, 2023 Latvian Eurovision entrants Sudden Lights, 2023 Romanian Eurovision entrant Theodor Andrei and the Moldovan National Symphony Orchestra performed as guests. 2023 Polish Eurovision entrant Blanka was also set to perform during the show as a guest, however, her flight to the event was cancelled.

Final – 4 March 2023
R/O	Artist	Song	Jury		Public vote		Total	Place
R/O	Artist	Song	Votes	Points	Votes	Points	Total	Place
1	Donia	"Red Zone"	24	5	196	6	11	5
2	OL	"Why You Play It Cool"	29	6	56	1	7	6
3	Victor Gulick	"Let's Dance"	17	3	72	2	5	9
4	Surorile Osoianu	"Bade, bădișor, bădiță"	35	7	1,524	8	15	4
5	Cosmina	"Indestructible" (Note: Cosmina was unable to perform due to health issues and her live audition performance was shown instead.)	10	2	113	5	7	6
6	Nördika	"Damn and Down"	10	1	100	4	5	9
7	Aliona Moon	"Du-mă"	52	10	1,133	7	17	3
8	SunStroke Project	"Yummy Mommy"	36	8	2,276	10	18	2
9	Pasha Parfeni	"Soarele și luna"	53	12	5,428	12	24	1
10	Corina Ivanov	"When Love's Real"	24	4	81	3	7	6

Detailed Jury Votes
R/O	Song	V. Constandoi	G. Tocari	V. Atanasov	L. Melnic	G. Mustea	Total
1	"Red Zone"	2	2	6	8	6	24
2	"Why You Play It Cool"	5	8	8	6	2	29
3	"Let's Dance"	3	4	3	4	3	17
4	"Bade, bădișor, bădiță"	8	5	7	7	8	35
5	"Indestructible"	4	3	1	1	1	10
6	"Damn and Down"	1	1	2	2	4	10
7	"Du-mă"	10	10	12	10	10	52
8	"Yummy Mommy"	12	7	5	5	7	36
9	"Soarele și luna"	7	12	10	12	12	53
10	"When Love's Real"	6	6	4	3	5	24

== At Eurovision ==
According to Eurovision rules, all nations with the exceptions of the host country and the "Big Five" (France, Germany, Italy, Spain and the United Kingdom) are required to qualify from one of two semi-finals in order to compete for the final; the top 10 countries from each semi-final progress to the final. The European Broadcasting Union (EBU) split up the competing countries into six different pots based on voting patterns from previous contests, with countries with favourable voting histories put into the same pot. On 31 January 2023, an allocation draw was held, which placed each country into one of the two semi-finals, and determined which half of the show they would perform in. Moldova has been placed into the first semi-final, to be held on 9 May 2023, and has been scheduled to perform in the second half of the show.

Once all the competing songs for the 2023 contest had been released, the running order for the semi-finals was decided by the shows' producers rather than through another draw, so that similar songs were not placed next to each other. Moldova was set to perform in position 10, following the entry from Israel and before the entry from Sweden.

At the end of the show, Moldova was announced as a qualifier for the final.

=== Voting ===
==== Points awarded to Moldova ====
Points awarded to Moldova (Semi-final 1)
Score	Televote
12 points	Italy; Portugal
10 points	France; Ireland
8 points	
7 points	Czech Republic; Finland
6 points	Germany; Israel; Latvia; Norway; Sweden
5 points	
4 points	Azerbaijan; Rest of the World; Serbia
3 points	Croatia; Netherlands
2 points	Switzerland
1 point	Malta

Points awarded to Moldova (Final)
Score	Televote	Jury
12 points	Italy; Romania	
10 points		
8 points	France; Portugal	Norway
7 points		Romania
6 points	Ukraine	
5 points	Czech Republic; Israel	
4 points	Ireland	
3 points	Finland; Georgia; San Marino	San Marino
2 points	Lithuania	Croatia
1 point	Croatia; Cyprus; Denmark; Spain; United Kingdom	

==== Points awarded by Moldova ====
Points awarded by Moldova (Semi-final 1)
Score	Televote
12 points	Israel
10 points	Sweden
8 points	Norway
7 points	Switzerland
6 points	Finland
5 points	Czech Republic
4 points	Portugal
3 points	Croatia
2 points	Netherlands
1 point	Latvia

Points awarded by Moldova (Final)
Score	Televote	Jury
12 points	Ukraine	Sweden
10 points	Israel	Italy
8 points	Sweden	Portugal
7 points	Finland	Estonia
6 points	Norway	Ukraine
5 points	Italy	Australia
4 points	Poland	Cyprus
3 points	Cyprus	Spain
2 points	Armenia	Armenia
1 point	Czech Republic	Albania

==== Detailed voting results ====
The following members comprised the Moldovan jury:

- Leonid Melnic
- Liviu Știrbu
- Aliona Munteanu
- Aliona Triboi
- Viorica Atanasov-Tăbârță

Detailed voting results from Moldova (Semi-final 1)
R/O	Country	Televote	
R/O	Country	Rank	Points
01	Norway	3	8
02	Malta	11	
03	Serbia	14	
04	Latvia	10	1
05	Portugal	7	4
06	Ireland	13	
07	Croatia	8	3
08	Switzerland	4	7
09	Israel	1	12
10	Moldova		
11	Sweden	2	10
12	Azerbaijan	12	
13	Czech Republic	6	5
14	Netherlands	9	2
15	Finland	5	6

Detailed voting results from Moldova (Final)
R/O	Country	Jury							Televote	
R/O	Country	Juror 1	Juror 2	Juror 3	Juror 4	Juror 5	Rank	Points	Rank	Points
01	Austria	21	13	17	16	7	13		15	
02	Portugal	3	9	1	9	11	3	8	17	
03	Switzerland	7	8	9	7	25	11		13	
04	Poland	13	24	20	15	8	15		7	4
05	Serbia	24	23	21	23	24	25		23	
06	France	25	22	22	18	10	19		12	
07	Cyprus	11	15	6	2	6	7	4	8	3
08	Spain	17	7	4	6	9	8	3	21	
09	Sweden	2	1	3	1	1	1	12	3	8
10	Albania	12	16	8	4	12	10	1	22	
11	Italy	4	3	2	3	3	2	10	6	5
12	Estonia	6	4	5	8	4	4	7	19	
13	Finland	20	21	25	25	17	24		4	7
14	Czech Republic	18	12	16	10	16	16		10	1
15	Australia	5	6	11	5	5	6	5	16	
16	Belgium	19	17	12	12	15	17		24	
17	Armenia	10	2	7	13	14	9	2	9	2
18	Moldova									
19	Ukraine	1	10	15	11	2	5	6	1	12
20	Norway	8	11	18	20	18	14		5	6
21	Germany	14	18	14	22	23	20		20	
22	Lithuania	22	14	19	24	22	23		18	
23	Israel	9	5	13	14	21	12		2	10
24	Slovenia	15	19	10	21	20	18		14	
25	Croatia	23	25	24	19	13	22		11	
26	United Kingdom	16	20	23	17	19	21		25	

== See also ==
- List of music released by Moldovan artists that has charted in major music markets
