= Denmark in the Eurovision Song Contest 2023 =

- Eurovision Song Contest 2023
- Participating broadcaster: Danish Broadcasting Corporation (DR)
- Country: Denmark
- Selection process: Dansk Melodi Grand Prix 2023
- Selection date: 11 February 2023

Competing entry
- Song: "Breaking My Heart"
- Artist: Reiley
- Songwriters: Bård Mathias Bonsaksen; Hilda Stenmalm; Rani Petersen; Sivert Hjeltnes Hagtvet

Placement
- Semi-final result: Failed to qualify (14th)

Participation chronology

Denmark was represented at the Eurovision Song Contest 2023 with the song "Breaking My Heart", written by Bård Mathias Bonsaksen, Hilda Stenmalm, Rani Petersen, and Sivert Hjeltnes Hagtvet, and performed by Petersen himself under his stage name Reiley. The Danish participating broadcaster, the Danish Broadcasting Corporation (DR), organised the national final Dansk Melodi Grand Prix 2023 in order to select its entry for the contest. Eight songs competed in a televised show where the winner was decided upon through two rounds of voting.

Denmark was assigned to compete in the second semi-final on May 11, 2023. Performing first in the semi-final, "Breaking My Heart" did not advance to the final, as it was not among the top 10 entries announced. It was subsequently revealed that Denmark ranked 14th out of 16 countries in the semi-final, earning 6 points, all from Iceland.

== Background ==
Prior to the 2023 contest, the Danish Broadcasting Corporation (DR) had participated in the Eurovision Song Contest representing Denmark fifty times since its first entry in 1957. It had won the contest, to this point, on three occasions: in 1963 with the song "Dansevise" performed by Grethe and Jørgen Ingmann, in 2000 with the song "Fly on the Wings of Love" performed by Olsen Brothers, and in 2013 with the song "Only Teardrops" performed by Emmelie de Forest. In 2022, "The Show" performed by Reddi failed to qualify to the final.

As part of its duties as participating broadcaster, DR organises the selection of its entry in the Eurovision Song Contest and broadcasts the event in the country. The broadcaster confirmed its intention to participate in the 2023 contest on 26 August 2022. DR has selected all of its Eurovision entries thus far through the national final Dansk Melodi Grand Prix. The broadcaster further announced that Dansk Melodi Grand Prix 2023 would be organised in order to select its entry for the 2023 contest.

== Before Eurovision ==
=== Dansk Melodi Grand Prix 2023 ===
Dansk Melodi Grand Prix 2023 was the 53rd edition of Dansk Melodi Grand Prix, the music competition that selects Denmark's entries for the Eurovision Song Contest. The event was held on 11 February 2023 at the Næstved Arena in Næstved, hosted by Tina Müller and Heino Hansen.

==== Format ====
Eight songs, all accompanied by the DR Grand Prix orchestra, competed in one show where the winner was determined over two rounds of voting. In the first round, the top three songs as determined exclusively via a public vote qualified to the superfinal. In the superfinal, the winner was determined based on the combination of votes from a public vote and a five-member jury panel. Viewers were able to vote via SMS or a newly introduced mobile application specifically designed for the competition. Prior to the show, the public was provided with one free vote on the app to cast a vote each day between 6 and 10 February 2023, while viewers using the app during the show were provided with two free votes.

The five-member jury panel was composed of:

- Anders Stig Gehrt Nielsen (Anders SG) – musician
- Annika Aakjær – singer-songwriter
- Emmelie de Forest – singer-songwriter, winner of the Eurovision Song Contest 2013
- Mich Hedin Hansen (Cutfather) – songwriter and music producer
- Ole Tøpholm – radio host on DR P3

==== Competing entries ====
DR opened a submission period between 8 September 2022 and 28 October 2022 for artists and composers to submit their entries. The broadcaster stated that the competition would seek out songs that "represent the quality and breadth of the Danish music scene" with emphasis on songs that "have the potential to represent Danish music and Danish culture in the most distinguished way at the Eurovision Song Contest." The eight competing entries were announced on 19 January 2023 at DR Byen in Copenhagen.

Two weeks before the national final, it was reported by Danish newspaper Ekstra Bladet that Reiley was at risk of disqualification from the competition, as it was revealed that he previously performed his entry "Breaking My Heart" at Slow Life Slow Live Festival in Seoul, South Korea, in October 2022. This was in contravention with the contest's rules that songs must not have been performed or released publicly prior to the contest without the broadcaster's permission. However, it was later decided by DR that the previous performance by Reiley did not give him a competitive advantage in relation to a Danish audience and participation in DMGP.

Artist	Song	Composer(s)
Eyjaa	"I Was Gonna Marry Him"	Maria Broberg, Rasmus Olsen, Thomas Buttenschøn
Frederik Leopold	"Stuck on You"	Frederik Jyll, Lasse Lindorff
Maia Maia	"Beautiful Bullshit"	Joy Deb, Maja Barløse, Niclas Lundin
Mariyah LeBerg	"Human"	Lars Pedersen, Mariyah LeBerg, Nermin Harambašić
Micky Skeel	"Glansbillede"	Martin Bjelke, Micky Skeel Hansen
Nicklas Sonne	"Freedom"	Nicklas Sonne
Reiley	"Breaking My Heart"	Bård Mathias Bonsaksen, Hilda Stenmalm, Rani Petersen, Sivert Hjeltnes Hagtvet
Søren Torpegaard Lund	"Lige her"	Lasse Storm, Martin Palme Skriver, Steven McClintock, Søren Torpegaard Lund, Tim Schou Nielsen

==== Final ====
The final took place on 11 February 2023. The running order was determined by DR and announced on 31 January 2023. In the first round of voting the top three advanced to the superfinal based on the votes of a public vote. In the week leading up to the show, viewers could vote through the DR Grand Prix app. During the show, viewers could via through SMS and the app. In the first round of voting the three songs with the most votes received through SMS as well as by each of Denmark's regions and autonomous territories were announced, and the top three advanced to the superfinal. In the superfinal, the winner, "Breaking My Heart" performed by Reiley, was selected based on the votes of a five-member jury (50%) and a public vote (50%). In addition to the performances of the competing entries, Svea S and Ukrainian Eurovision Song Contest 2022 winner Kalush Orchestra performed as the interval acts.

It was reported by DR that DR Grand Prix, the app used for voting during the national final, crashed due to overload, which caused several breaks during the show. However, according to DMGP program manager Erik Struve, the results of the show were not affected by the app crash.

Final – 11 February 2023
R/O	Artist	Song	Result
1	Frederik Leopold	"Stuck on You"	Eliminated
2	Eyjaa	"I Was Gonna Marry Him"	Eliminated
3	Micky Skeel	"Glansbillede"	Advanced
4	Maia Maia	"Beautiful Bullshit"	Eliminated
5	Nicklas Sonne	"Freedom"	Advanced
6	Mariyah LeBerg	"Human"	Eliminated
7	Søren Torpegaard Lund	"Lige her"	Eliminated
8	Reiley	"Breaking My Heart"	Advanced

Detailed Regional Televoting Results
R/O	Song	North Jutland, Faroe Islands, and Greenland	Central Denmark	Southern Denmark	Zealand	Capital Region	SMS
1	"Stuck on You"						
2	"I Was Gonna Marry Him"						
3	"Glansbillede"	X	X	X	X	X	
4	"Beautiful Bullshit"						X
5	"Freedom"	X	X	X	X	X	
6	"Human"						X
7	"Lige her"						
8	"Breaking My Heart"	X	X	X	X	X	X

Superfinal – 11 February 2023
R/O	Artist	Song	Jury	Televote	Total	Place
1	Micky Skeel	"Glansbillede"	8	15	23	3
2	Nicklas Sonne	"Freedom"	14	20	34	2
3	Reiley	"Breaking My Heart"	28	15	43	1

== At Eurovision ==
According to Eurovision rules, all nations with the exceptions of the host country and the "Big Five" (France, Germany, Italy, Spain and the United Kingdom) are required to qualify from one of two semi-finals in order to compete for the final; the top ten countries from each semi-final progress to the final. The European Broadcasting Union (EBU) split up the competing countries into six different pots based on voting patterns from previous contests, with countries with favourable voting histories put into the same pot. On 31 January 2023, an allocation draw was held, which placed each country into one of the two semi-finals, and determined which half of the show they would perform in. Denmark has been placed into the second semi-final, to be held on 11 May 2023, and has been scheduled to perform in the first half of the show.

Once all the competing songs for the 2023 contest had been released, the running order for the semi-finals was decided by the shows' producers rather than through another draw, so that similar songs were not placed next to each other. Denmark was set to perform in position 1, before the entry from Armenia.

At the end of the show, Denmark was not among the ten countries announced as qualifiers for the final.

All three shows were broadcast live within Denmark on DR1 with Danish commentary provided by Nicolai Molbech. The three shows were also broadcast within the Faroe Islands on Kringvarp Føroya, with both Danish-language commentary via DR and Faroese commentary by Gunnar Nolsøe and Siri Súsonnudóttir Hansen available. The semi-final 1 broadcast on DR1 reached a total of 380,000 viewers, while the semi-final 2, which included the participation of Denmark, was viewed by 479,000 people. 372,000 people tuned into the DR1 broadcast of the final, a drop of around 150,000 viewers compared to the 2022 contest.

=== Voting ===
==== Points awarded to Denmark ====
Points awarded to Denmark (Semi-final 2)
Score	Televote
12 points	
10 points	
8 points	
7 points	
6 points	Iceland
5 points	
4 points	
3 points	
2 points	
1 point	

==== Points awarded by Denmark ====
Points awarded by Denmark (Semi-final)
Score	Televote
12 points	Iceland
10 points	Australia
8 points	Belgium
7 points	Poland
6 points	Austria
5 points	Lithuania
4 points	Cyprus
3 points	Albania
2 points	Slovenia
1 point	Estonia

Points awarded by Denmark (Final)
Score	Televote	Jury
12 points	Finland	Sweden
10 points	Norway	Norway
8 points	Sweden	Finland
7 points	Ukraine	Austria
6 points	Belgium	France
5 points	Poland	Cyprus
4 points	Switzerland	Lithuania
3 points	Italy	Belgium
2 points	Cyprus	Australia
1 point	Moldova	United Kingdom

==== Detailed voting results ====
Detailed voting results from Denmark (Semi-final 2)
R/O	Country	Televote	
R/O	Country	Rank	Points
01	Denmark		
02	Armenia	11	
03	Romania	15	
04	Estonia	10	1
05	Belgium	3	8
06	Cyprus	7	4
07	Iceland	1	12
08	Greece	12	
09	Poland	4	7
10	Slovenia	9	2
11	Georgia	13	
12	San Marino	14	
13	Austria	5	6
14	Albania	8	3
15	Lithuania	6	5
16	Australia	2	10

Detailed voting results from Denmark (Final)
R/O	Country	Jury							Televote	
R/O	Country	Juror 1	Juror 2	Juror 3	Juror 4	Juror 5	Rank	Points	Rank	Points
01	Austria	6	7	6	7	19	4	7	19	
02	Portugal	20	22	23	24	22	25		25	
03	Switzerland	15	8	3	12	21	11		7	4
04	Poland	19	11	12	19	9	18		6	5
05	Serbia	25	19	2	25	25	15		22	
06	France	17	20	15	2	5	5	6	13	
07	Cyprus	7	4	7	13	12	6	5	9	2
08	Spain	18	25	20	8	15	21		26	
09	Sweden	1	1	1	1	2	1	12	3	8
10	Albania	22	23	25	26	13	24		16	
11	Italy	13	21	10	3	17	13		8	3
12	Estonia	8	6	9	16	16	14		21	
13	Finland	2	3	17	5	10	3	8	1	12
14	Czech Republic	16	17	18	14	4	16		12	
15	Australia	3	10	21	20	6	9	2	11	
16	Belgium	14	14	14	15	1	8	3	5	6
17	Armenia	11	18	11	9	14	17		23	
18	Moldova	24	24	5	22	18	19		10	1
19	Ukraine	12	15	26	11	23	22		4	7
20	Norway	5	5	8	4	3	2	10	2	10
21	Germany	23	9	16	23	24	23		20	
22	Lithuania	10	2	19	21	7	7	4	14	
23	Israel	4	16	13	6	20	12		17	
24	Slovenia	21	13	24	17	8	20		18	
25	Croatia	26	26	22	18	26	26		15	
26	United Kingdom	9	12	4	10	11	10	1	24	
