= United Kingdom in the Eurovision Song Contest 2023 =

- Eurovision Song Contest 2023
- Participating broadcaster: British Broadcasting Corporation (BBC)
- Country: United Kingdom
- Selection process: Internal selection
- Announcement date: 9 March 2023

Competing entry
- Song: "I Wrote a Song"
- Artist: Mae Muller
- Songwriters: Holly Mae Muller; Lewis Thompson; Karen Poole

Placement
- Final result: 25th, 24 points

Participation chronology

The United Kingdom was represented at the Eurovision Song Contest 2023 with the song "I Wrote a Song", written by Holly Mae Muller, Lewis Thompson, and Karen Poole, and performed by Mae Muller herself. The British participating broadcaster, the British Broadcasting Corporation (BBC), internally selected both the song and the performer, in collaboration with record label TaP Music and their management company. In addition, the BBC was also the host broadcaster and staged the event at the Liverpool Arena in Liverpool on behalf of the winning broadcaster of the previous edition, the Public Broadcasting Company of Ukraine (UA:PBC).

As both the host country and a member of the "Big Five", the United Kingdom automatically qualified to compete in the final of the Eurovision Song Contest. Muller performed in the second half of the Eurovision final, closing the show in position 26. She finished in twenty-fifth place with 24 points.

An average of 10.237 million people watched the final on BBC One, with a peak viewing figure later reaching 11 million, the highest UK viewing figures for the contest in history. The semi-finals also reached record viewing figures, being broadcast on the BBC's flagship channel alongside the final for the first time ever, with the first semi-final averaging 2.541 million viewers and the second semi-final averaging 2.496 million viewers.

== Background ==
Prior to the 2023 contest, the British Broadcasting Corporation (BBC) has participated in the Eurovision Song Contest representing the United Kingdom sixty-four times. Thus far, it has won the contest five times: in 1967 with the song "Puppet on a String" performed by Sandie Shaw, in 1969 with the song "Boom Bang-a-Bang" performed by Lulu, in 1976 with "Save Your Kisses for Me" performed by Brotherhood of Man, in 1981 with the song "Making Your Mind Up" performed by Bucks Fizz and in 1997 with the song "Love Shine a Light" performed by Katrina and the Waves. To this point, the nation is noted for having finished as the runner-up in a record sixteen contests. Up to and including 1998, it had only twice finished outside the top 10, in 1978 and 1987. Since 1999, the year in which the rule was abandoned that songs must be performed in one of the official languages of the country participating, the UK has had less success, only finishing within the top ten three times, in 2002 with the song "Come Back" performed by Jessica Garlick, in 2009 with the song "It's My Time" performed by Jade Ewen, and in 2021, when "Space Man" performed by Sam Ryder finished in second place.

As part of its duties as participating broadcaster, the BBC organises the selection of its entry in the Eurovision Song Contest and broadcasts the event in the country. The broadcaster confirmed its participation in the 2023 contest on 25 July 2022. Previously, the BBC has used a plethora of methods to select its entry: From 1957 to 2010, it organised a national final which featured a competition among several artists and songs to choose the entry for the contest. Then between 2011 and 2015, the BBC opted to internally select its entry. For its 2016 entry, the broadcaster announced that a national final would be organised again. The same process was used in 2017 and 2018, and changes were brought in for 2019. In 2020 and 2021, the BBC opted to return to an internal selection, in collaboration with record label BMG. For the 2022 contest, the BBC began collaboration with TaP Music to internally select its entry, a process that was continued for 2023. On 25 July 2022, it was confirmed by the European Broadcasting Union (EBU) that the BBC would host the 2023 contest on behalf of the winning broadcaster of the previous contest, the Public Broadcasting Company of Ukraine (UA:PBC), and Liverpool was later announced as the host city on 7 October.

== Before Eurovision ==
=== Internal selection ===
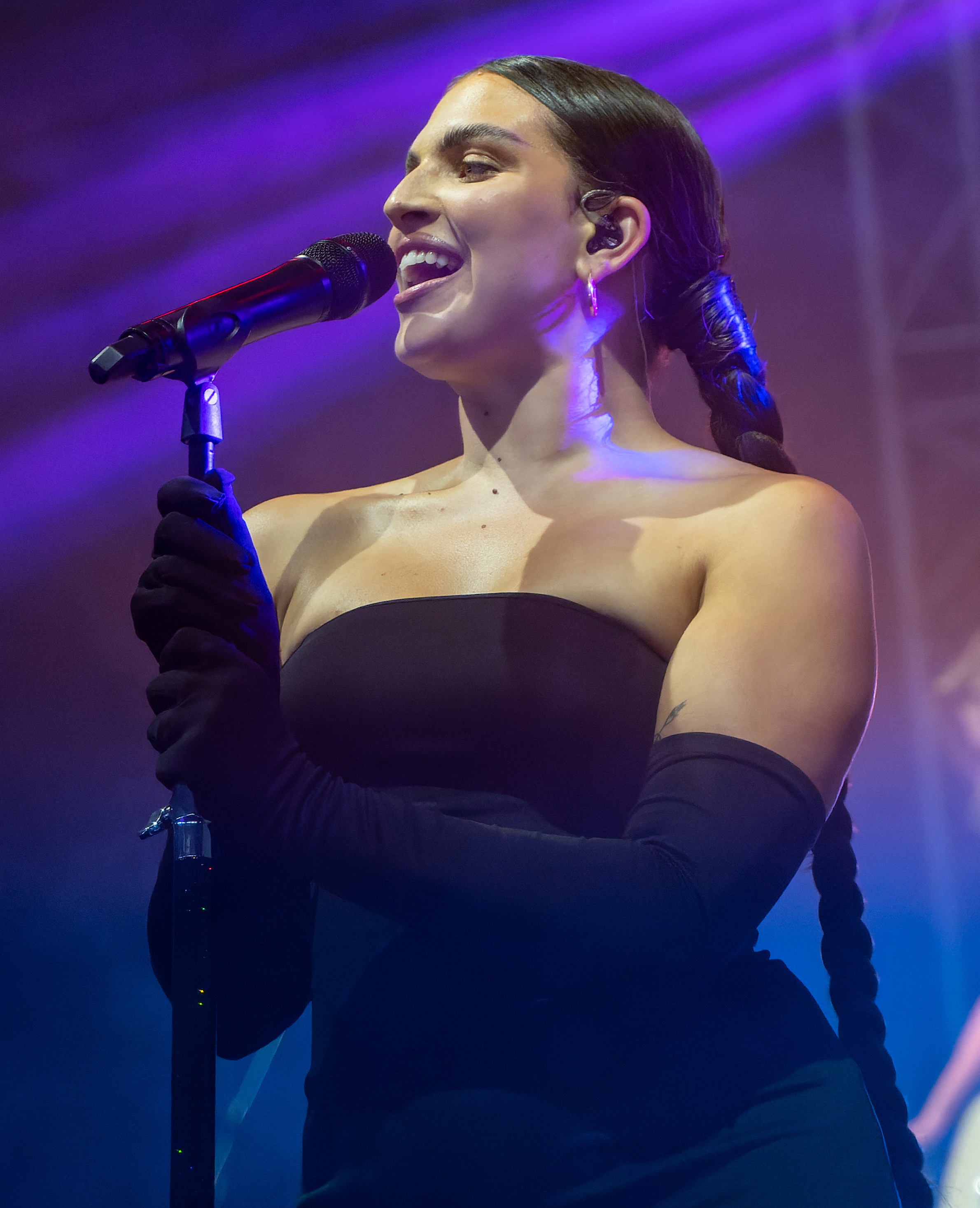
Mae Muller was internally selected by the BBC to represent the UK in Liverpool.

The British entry for the 2023 contest was internally selected by the BBC in collaboration with TaP Music. The selection process was confirmed on 8 September 2022, following the successful result for the United Kingdom at the 2022 contest. Rachel Ashdown, Commissioning Editor for the BBC, stated:

"We are thrilled that Ben Mawson and Ed Millett plus the team at TaP will once again bring their unrivalled expertise to work with the BBC and BBC Studios to find an act and song to represent the UK at Eurovision. I hope we can find another artist who will not only be a brilliant ambassador for Eurovision but like Sam will sing their head off with a stand out song."

— Rachel Ashdown

On 31 January 2023, it was reported that four acts were left in the running to represent the United Kingdom at the 2023 contest. Among the rumoured candidates were Mimi Webb, Birdy, Jessie Ware and Ellie Goulding, as well as Rina Sawayama, with Radio Times stating that she had been selected; this was later denied by Sawayama's management, however, in an interview in June 2023 the singer clarified that she had been contacted by the BBC and TaP management and had shown interest in representing the country, but never received response. On 9 March 2023, during The Radio 2 Breakfast Show with Zoe Ball, Mae Muller was announced as the chosen entrant with her song "I Wrote a Song". Later that evening, Muller appeared in a special programme on BBC One, titled Eurovision 2023: Meet the UK Act, where she was interviewed by Scott Mills, followed by the first full televised broadcast of the song's music video. It was reported that the show was watched by an audience of over 2.76 million, becoming the second most watched TV show in the UK that day. She was interviewed the following day on that evening's edition of The One Show, where a behind-the-scenes look at the filming of the music video in Lithuania was broadcast.

"I'm so excited to participate in Eurovision this year and represent the UK! I've loved watching Eurovision all my life, so to compete in such a massive music competition is simply brilliant. I'm a huge fan of so many of the artists that have found success at Eurovision, from ABBA to Måneskin!"

— Mae Muller

=== Promotion ===
In order to promote "I Wrote a Song" as the British entry for the 2023 contest, Muller is embarking on a promotional tour throughout Europe. Kicking off her international promotional activities on 25 March 2023, performing at the Barcelona Eurovision pre-party, Muller then travelled to Warsaw, Poland on 1 April 2023 and Madrid on 8 April 2023, the latter of which she performed at the PrePartyES in Madrid's Sala La Riviera. Muller also made appearances at the Eurovision in Concert 2023 at Amsterdam's AFAS Live on 15 April 2023, and the London Eurovision Party at London's Here at Outernet venue on 16 April. She also made several interviews with broadcasters across Europe, including ORF to explore her Austrian ancestry and San Marino RTV, where she discussed her plans for her performance in Liverpool.

Muller is also making several appearances on British television and radio in order to promote her entry to the domestic audience. She appeared on BBC Radio 2 on 21 March 2023 and BBC Radio Somerset on 25 March 2023. On 31 March 2023, Muller appeared on the ITV chat show This Morning to discuss her plans for the contest. On 7 April 2023, Muller launched her YouTube series Road to Eurovision, documenting her journey to the contest in Liverpool. On 14 April, Muller released an acoustic version of "I Wrote a Song". On 26 April 2023, Muller met with King Charles III and Queen Camilla in Liverpool for the reveal of the Eurovision stage. The monarch wished Muller the best of luck at the contest and stated that he would be "egging her on" as the British entry.

== At Eurovision ==
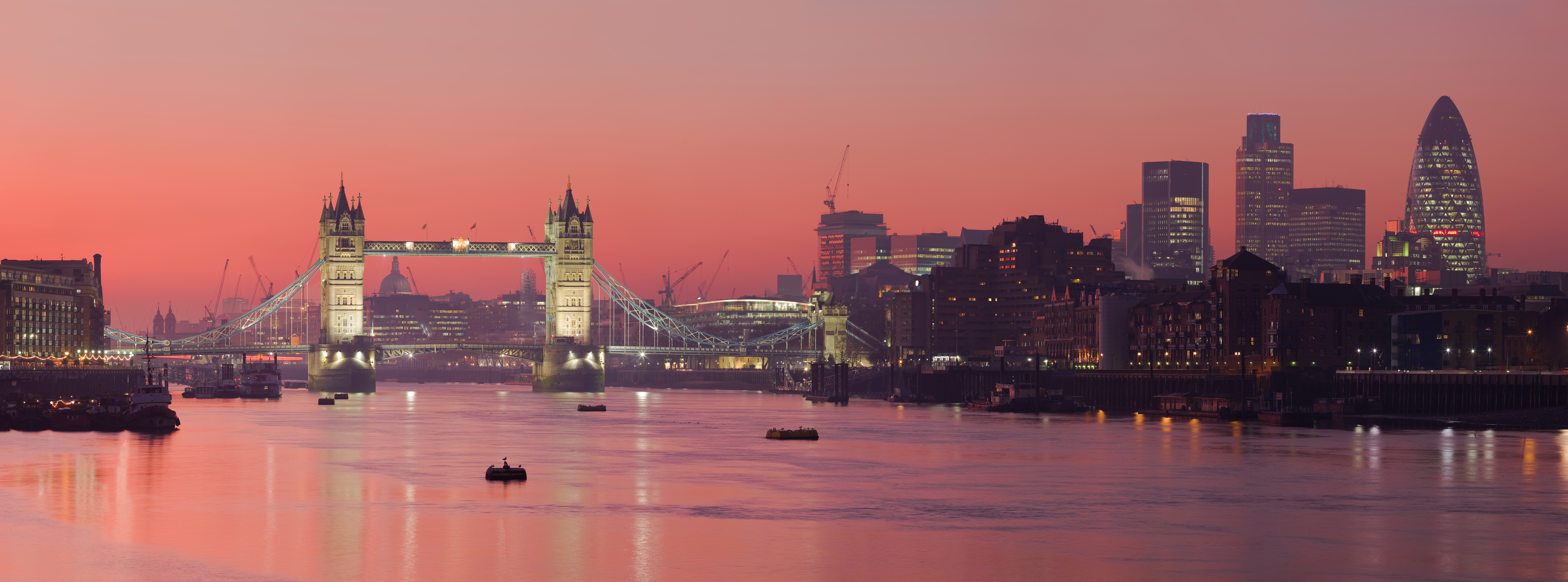
A video postcard introduced Mae Muller's performance in the final of the Eurovision Song Contest 2023. The postcard was filmed at the River Thames in March 2023 by the BBC. The River Mersey in host city Liverpool and Dnieper River in Kyiv also featured in the British postcard, which was outlined by the theme of rivers.

The Eurovision Song Contest 2023 took place at the Liverpool Arena in Liverpool. According to Eurovision rules, all nations with the exceptions of the host country and the "Big Five" (France, Germany, Italy, Spain and the United Kingdom) are required to qualify from one of two semi-finals in order to compete for the final; the top ten countries from each semi-final progress to the final. As such, the United Kingdom automatically qualified to compete in the final as both the host country and a member of the "Big Five". During the semi-final allocation draw on 31 January 2023, the UK was drawn to vote in the second semi-final on 11 May 2023. On 13 March 2023, during the Heads of Delegation meeting, the UK was drawn to perform in position 26. It was the first time since 2001 that a host country has closed the final.

Both semi-finals were broadcast on BBC One, with the commentary team consisting of Scott Mills and Rylan Clark; on BBC iPlayer with British Sign Language interpretation and on BBC Radio 2, BBC Radio Merseyside and BBC Red Button with commentary by Paddy O'Connell. This marked the first time that the semi-finals were broadcast on BBC One and BBC Radio 2. The final was broadcast on BBC One's regional variations across the UK with commentary by Mel Giedroyc and Graham Norton, the latter of whom also co-hosted the show; on BBC Radio 2 with commentary by Scott Mills and Rylan Clark; on BBC Radio Merseyside with commentary by Claire Sweeney and Paul Quinn, the latter of whom was chosen as part of the station's "The Voice of Eurovision" talent search campaign; and on BBC iPlayer with British Sign Language interpretation. For a second year running, the BBC also broadcast a Eurovision after-party on BBC Radio 2, which was presented by OJ Borg. The BBC appointed Catherine Tate as its spokesperson to announced the top 12-point score awarded by the British jury during the final.

=== Final ===
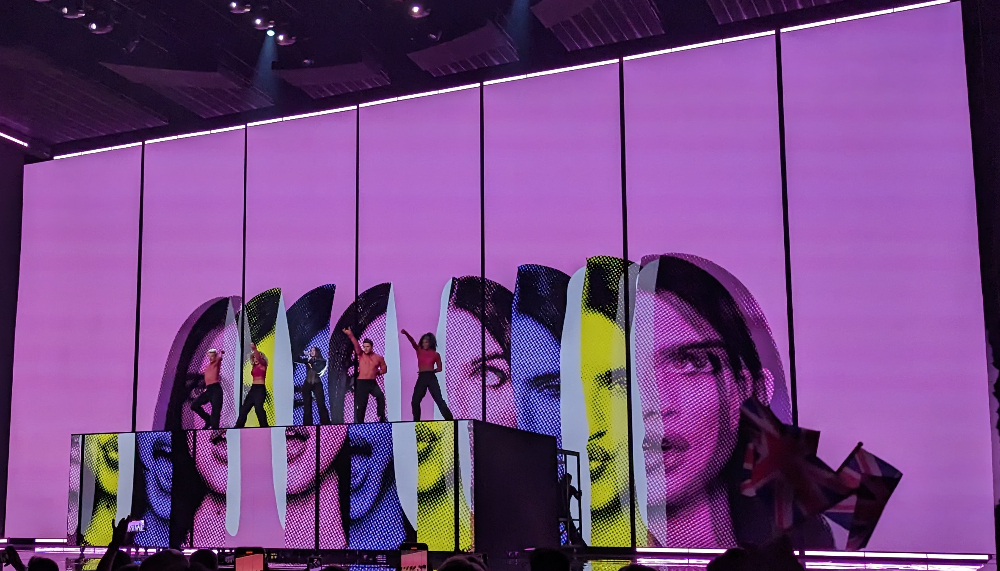
Mae Muller during a rehearsal before the final.

Muller took part in technical rehearsals on 4 and 6 May, followed by dress rehearsals on 10, 11, 12 and 13 May. This included the semi-final jury show on 10 May, where an extended clip of the British performance, was filmed for broadcast during the live show on 11 May, and the jury final on 12 May, where the professional juries of each country watched and voted on the competing entries. The United Kingdom performed in the 26th position, closing the show and following the entries from Croatia and Slovenia respectively.

The British performance featured a plinth upon which both Muller and the dancers were positioned, with a strong use of pop art style LED graphics. The second half of the performance featured a strong dance routine that builds through to the end, with a spoken verse included, altering the studio version of the song.

=== Voting ===
Below is a breakdown of points awarded to United Kingdom in the final. Voting during the three shows involved each country awarding sets of points from 1–8, 10 and 12: one from their professional jury and the other from televoting in the final vote, while the semi-final vote was based entirely on the vote of the public. The exact composition of the professional jury, and the results of each country's jury and televoting were released after the final; the individual results from each jury member were also released in an anonymised form. The British jury consisted of Jack Hawitt, Jim Spencer, Theo Johnson, Heidi Partakis and Shaznay Lewis. In the final, the United Kingdom placed 25th with 24 points. Over the course of the contest, the UK awarded its 12 points to Lithuania in the second semi-final, and to Sweden (jury) and Finland (televote) in the final.

==== Points awarded to the United Kingdom ====
Points awarded to the United Kingdom (Final)
Score	Televote	Jury
12 points		
10 points		
8 points		
7 points		
6 points		
5 points	Ukraine	
4 points	Malta	Finland; Sweden; Ukraine
3 points		
2 points		Ireland
1 point		Denmark

==== Points awarded by the United Kingdom ====
Points awarded by the United Kingdom (Semi-final)
Score	Televote
12 points	Lithuania
10 points	Poland
8 points	Australia
7 points	Austria
6 points	Belgium
5 points	Albania
4 points	Cyprus
3 points	Slovenia
2 points	Estonia
1 point	Iceland

Points awarded by the United Kingdom (Final)
Score	Televote	Jury
12 points	Finland	Sweden
10 points	Lithuania	Australia
8 points	Poland	Lithuania
7 points	Norway	Belgium
6 points	Belgium	Estonia
5 points	Sweden	Spain
4 points	Ukraine	Israel
3 points	Israel	Armenia
2 points	Australia	Italy
1 point	Moldova	Slovenia

==== Detailed voting results ====
Each participating broadcaster assembles a five-member jury panel consisting of music industry professionals who are citizens of the country they represent, with their names published before the contest to ensure transparency. This jury judged each entry based on: vocal capacity; the stage performance; the song's composition and originality; and the overall impression by the act. In addition, no member of a national jury was permitted to be related in any way to any of the competing acts in such a way that they cannot vote impartially and independently. The individual rankings of each jury member as well as the nation's televoting results were released shortly after the grand final.

The following members comprised the British jury:

- Jack Hawitt – songwriter, producer, DJ
- Jim Spencer – producer, songwriter
- Theo Johnson – broadcaster, scriptwriter, actor
- Heidi Partakis – singer
- Shaznay Lewis – singer

Detailed voting results from United Kingdom (Semi-final 2)
R/O	Country	Televote	
R/O	Country	Rank	Points
01	Denmark	13	
02	Armenia	12	
03	Romania	16	
04	Estonia	9	2
05	Belgium	5	6
06	Cyprus	7	4
07	Iceland	10	1
08	Greece	11	
09	Poland	2	10
10	Slovenia	8	3
11	Georgia	14	
12	San Marino	15	
13	Austria	4	7
14	Albania	6	5
15	Lithuania	1	12
16	Australia	3	8

Detailed voting results from United Kingdom (Final)
R/O	Country	Jury							Televote	
R/O	Country	Juror 1	Juror 2	Juror 3	Juror 4	Juror 5	Rank	Points	Rank	Points
01	Austria	13	19	12	4	16	14		12	
02	Portugal	17	13	18	22	15	20		21	
03	Switzerland	23	10	22	17	12	18		16	
04	Poland	12	18	13	18	10	17		3	8
05	Serbia	18	23	24	23	24	24		24	
06	France	19	16	14	20	5	16		18	
07	Cyprus	7	9	11	11	13	13		11	
08	Spain	3	8	19	5	19	6	5	23	
09	Sweden	1	2	1	2	1	1	12	6	5
10	Albania	14	11	15	13	2	12		17	
11	Italy	11	12	8	15	3	9	2	14	
12	Estonia	25	3	7	8	7	5	6	20	
13	Finland	22	21	16	21	23	22		1	12
14	Czech Republic	16	20	17	10	20	19		19	
15	Australia	2	5	2	1	14	2	10	9	2
16	Belgium	6	14	5	3	6	4	7	5	6
17	Armenia	5	7	9	12	9	8	3	25	
18	Moldova	20	24	21	14	18	21		10	1
19	Ukraine	9	17	20	6	21	15		7	4
20	Norway	8	15	4	7	17	11		4	7
21	Germany	15	22	23	24	22	23		15	
22	Lithuania	4	1	10	9	4	3	8	2	10
23	Israel	10	6	3	16	11	7	4	8	3
24	Slovenia	21	4	6	19	8	10	1	22	
25	Croatia	24	25	25	25	25	25		13	
26	United Kingdom									
