= Beatrich =

- Born: Beatričė Pundžiūtė; 16 April 1998 (age 28); Kaunas, Lithuania
- Genres: Pop, Alternative rock
- Occupations: Singer; songwriter
- Instrument: Vocals
- Years active: 2017–present
- Label: Twin Music

Beatričė Pundžiūtė (born 16 April 1998), known professionally as Beatrich, is a Lithuanian rock, pop music singer and songwriter.

== Biography ==
Pundžiūtė was born in Kaunas, but moved to Šilute at a very young age. She was born in a medical family. While still in kindergarten, she sang in a small ensemble, played and sang in a country music group at school, and also studied violin at a music school. After finishing school, she moved to Kaunas. After becoming famous, for some time (3-4 months) she went to Los Angeles for "creative vacation" to write some songs. Later she moved to England, London to be and work with her team more. Currently she still lives in London, returning to Lithuania for concerts.

On a podcast (Nesiaukite vol.50 - Beatrich) she mentioned, that she was born in Kaunas, but in her birth certificate its written that she was born in Šilutė.

== Musical career ==
On 20 December 2022, it was announced that Beatrich would participate in the Lithuanian national selection for Eurovision "Pabandom iš naujo! 2023" with the song "Like a Movie". The song was publicly released in January. She participated in the second heat and came in first place. She performed her song once again in the second semi final and came in first place again, thus qualifying to the final. In the final of the competition, she finished in third place with a total of 16 points.

== Discography ==
=== Studio albums ===
Title	Album details
Songs About You	Release: 2 November 2022; Format: Digital download

=== Singles ===
Title	Year	Peak chart position	Albums
Title	Year	LT (AGATA TOP 100)	Albums
"About"	2017		Non album singles
"Don't Let My go"	2017		Non album singles
"Good Things" (with Radistai DJs)	2017		Non album singles
"Hollywood"	2017		Non album singles
"I Need the Beat"	2017		Non album singles
"Superstar"	2017		Non album singles
"Everything You Say"	2018		Non album singles
"Pardon Me"	2018		Non album singles
"Love Shot"	2018		Non album singles
"Runaway"	2019		Non album singles
"Flashback"	2020		Non album singles
"Same Song"	2021		Non album singles
"2 Much"	2021		Non album singles
"Believe"	2021		Non album singles
"Hands Tied"	2021		Songs About You
"Wishlist"	2022		Songs About You
"Postcards"	2022		Songs About You
"Love Bites"	2022		Songs About You
"Wish You Wanted To See Me"	2022		Songs About You
"Cold hands"	2022		Songs About You
"Like a Movie"	2023		Non album single

== Awards and nominations ==
Year	Award	Category	Nominee/work	Result
2018	M.A.M.A. 2017	Breakthrough of the Year		Won
2018	M.A.M.A. 2017	Best Song	"Superstar"	Won
2018	M.A.M.A. 2017	Best Song	"Good Things" (with Radistai DJs)	Nominated
2018	M.A.M.A. 2017	Best Music Video	"Good Things" (with Radistai DJs)	Nominated
