= Chris Noah =

Latvian singer

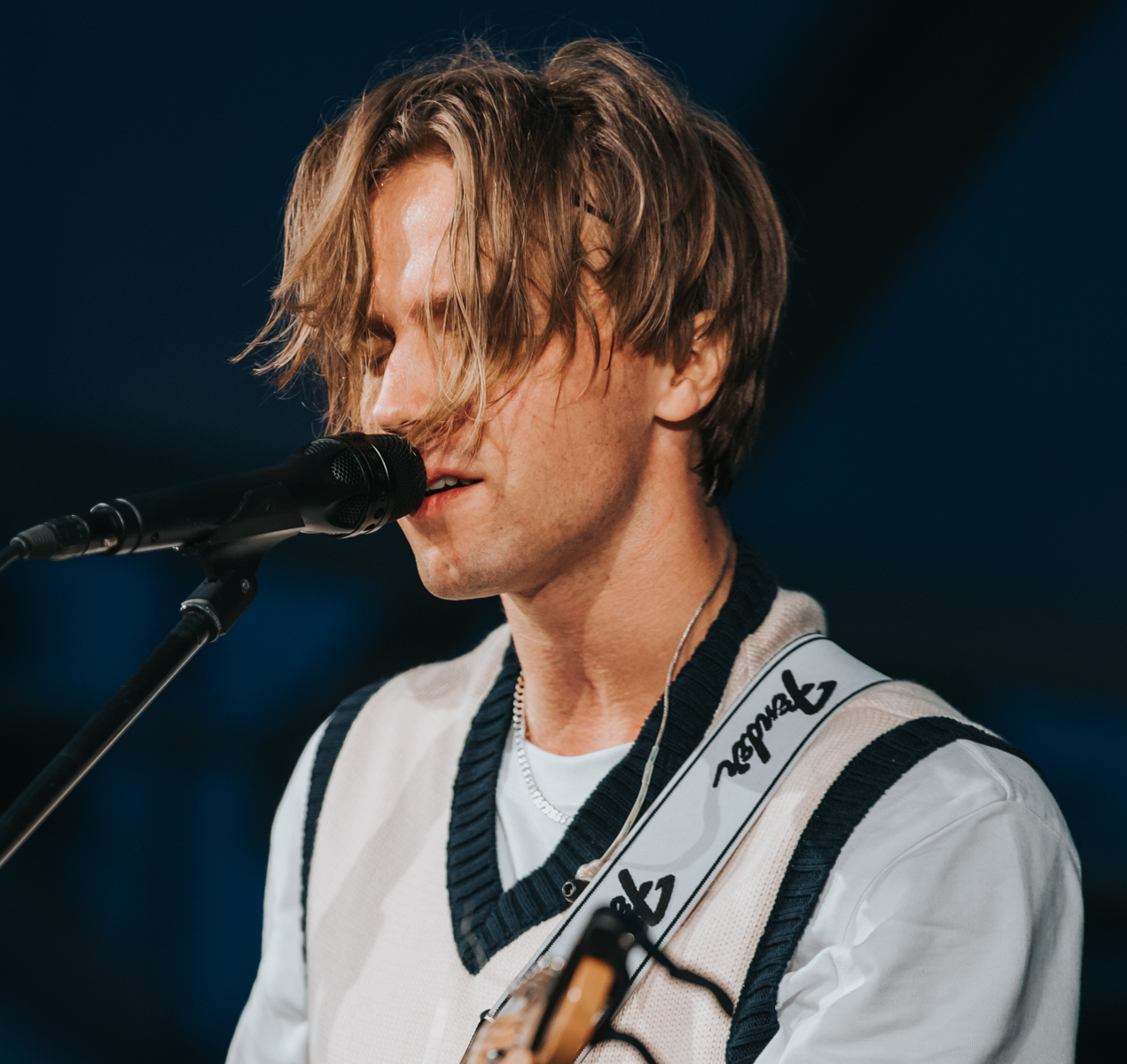
- Chris Noah in 2021

Background information
- Also known as: Chris Noah (Sometimes spelled Kriss Noa in Latvia)
- Born: Krists Indrišonoks; 27 February 1995 (age 31); Riga, Latvia
- Genres: Indie, Pop, pop rock
- Occupations: Singer; songwriter
- Instruments: Vocals, guitar
- Years active: 2015–present
- Label: Sony Music Entertainment

Krists Indrišonoks (born 27 February 1995), better known as Chris Noah, is a Latvian singer and songwriter. Noah won Album of the Year for Atvadas nav skumjas, ja zinām, ka drīz tiksimies, and Song of the Year for "Nomodā" at the 2025 Latvian Music Recording Awards. His single "Romance Isn't Dead" finished 5th at the 2025 Supernova, which is used as the Latvian national selection for the Eurovision Song Contest.

His EPs include What about Tomorrow? (2017), Distance (2020) and Red Light (2022). He released his first full-length album Atvadas nav skumjas, ja zinām, ka drīz tiksimies in October 2024.

== Early life ==
Noah grew up in Olaine, Latvia in a two-bedroom apartment with his parents and brother. Both of his parents are musical: his father, Valdis Indrišonoks is a professional guitarist and songwriter and his mother is a music teacher. Noah studied guitar and graduated from a music school as a child, but his interest in music re-ignited when he was 17-years-old as an emotional outlet; previously he wanted to be a hockey or basketball player.

== Career ==
=== 2015–2019: Early work ===
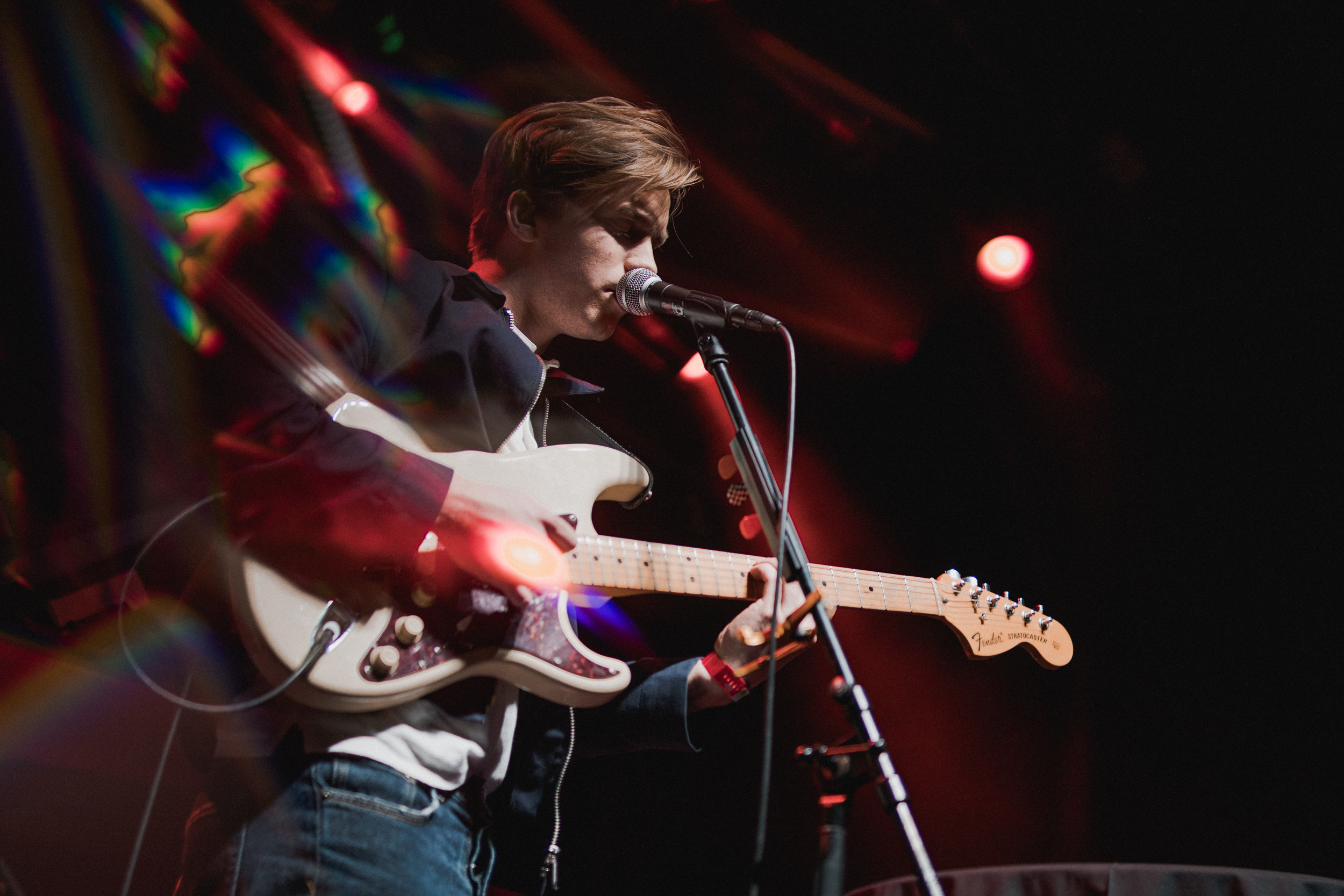
Noah performing 2019

In 2015, Chris Noah released his first single "Had It All". In 2016, he released his second single "You" which became one of the most played songs in Latvia and earned a 2017 AKKA/LAA Copyright Infinity Award for its use on television, public and commercial radio channels. He released his debut EP What About Tomorrow? in 2017, which was nominated for the Best Debut award at the 2018 Latvian Music Recording Awards (also known as the Zelta Mikrofons (lit. 'Golden Microphone'). He performed at the 2017 Reeperbahn music festival, saying "I also want to prove myself outside of Latvia's borders and I am especially happy that one of the first foreign stages are precisely the Reeperbahn Campus Festival".

=== 2020–present: Rise in popularity ===
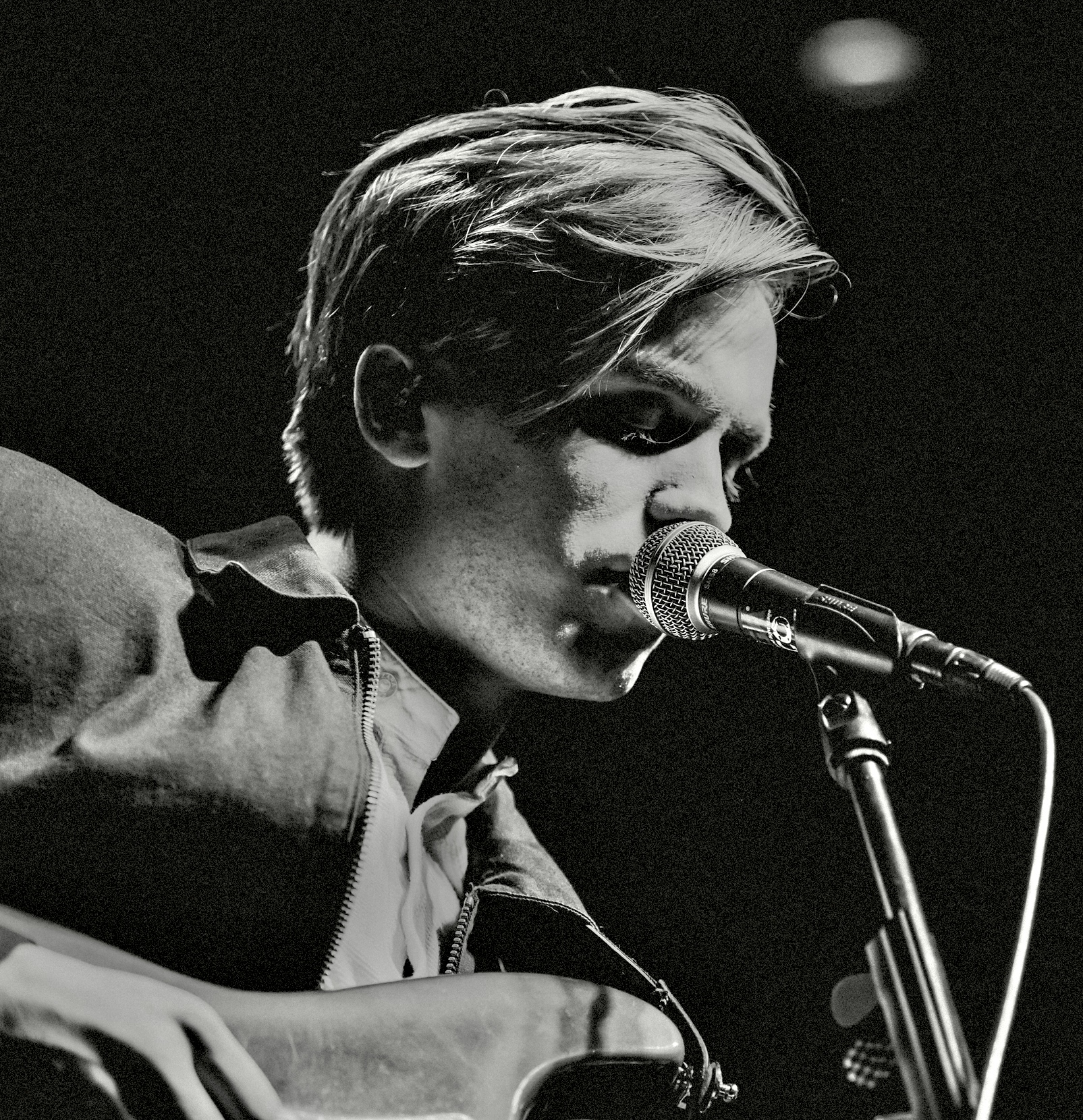
Noah performing in 2019

In 2020, he signed with Made in Baltics (Sony Music Entertainment) to release his second EP Distance just a week after the 2020 COVID Pandemic hit and closed public spaces in Latvia. The title track "Distance" is "how social media allows us to follow each other without actually communicating. It is kind of sad, but common, especially in the process of moving on and being in a perpetual battle with yourself". The pandemic forced the cancellation of his 2020 concerts, so he released a deluxe version of Distance which included new tracks written in the meantime. The single "This Is The Night" from the deluxe version reached the top of radio Star FM and Estonian Raadio 2 and lead to two performances at the 2020 Tallinn Music Week. The album Distance was nominated for Best Pop Music Album at the 2021 Latvian Music Recording Awards.

In 2022 Noah signed with Sony Entertainment Finland to release his next EP Red Light. He said his writing process for the album came from realizing "for the first time that 'not feeling love' isn't just a made-up concept or an excuse to get out of a relationship you no longer want to be in. This realization was the core of my writing process, which I approached from various angles: uncertainty, doubt, jealousy, and regret. The title track 'Red Light' is about the disappearance of illusions". The album was nominated for Best Pop Album and the single "Sunboy" for Best Song at the 2023 Latvian Music Recording Awards.

In 2023, he co-wrote "Stay", which was performed by Lithuanian singer Monika Linkytė at the Eurovision Song Contest 2023, finishing in 11th place. He also announced his first sold-out solo concert, after having played numerous music festivals in his career. He released his first single "Cik tālu vēl?" (lit. 'How far yet?') in his native Latvian language. Noah stated that "The song didn't come together as smoothly as I hoped—it was a challenge. I thought writing lyrics in Latvian would be easier". He wanted to convey something personal and real while avoiding clichés, adding he would continue to write more songs in Latvian. "Cik tālu vēl?" (lit. 'How far yet?') was nominated for Top Radio Hit at the 2024 Latvian Music Recording Awards.

In March 2024, he released his second Latvian language single "Nomodā" (lit. 'Awake') and announced the release of an upcoming album inspired by the sounds of the 80s. He joined Latvian singer Dons as a backing singer during his Eurovision Song Contest 2024 performances; Noah previously was the opening act for Dons at his 2022 Sigulda Castle Ruins concert and opened again for his 2024 Laiks (lit. 'Time') concert at the Daugava Stadium. In July 2024, he announced a solo concert at the prestigious Palladium Riga taking place 7 November 2024 and released his third Latvian language single "Desmitiem Reižu" (lit. 'Dozens of Times'), which reached the top of Latvian music charts.

In October 2024, Noah released his first full-length album Atvadas nav skumjas, ja zinām, ka drīz tiksimies (lit. 'Goodbye is not sad if we know we'll meet soon'). The album is mostly in Latvian, but has one English song. He describes the album as "This full-length album definitely starts a new phase in my music. I tried to feel and connect two worlds - musically, I drew parallels with pop music from the last century, while I constructed the texts on topics that are relevant to me right now. Each song is a very real story about real people and feelings". He also released "Kādreiz" (lit. 'Once up a time') as the first single.

At the 2025 Latvian Music Recording Awards (Zelta Mikrofons), he won five awards from six nominations, including the album Atvadas nav skumjas, ja zinām, ka drīz tiksimies (lit. 'Goodbye is not sad if we know we'll meet soon') winning Album of the Year and Best Pop/Pop Rock Album; his single "Nomodā" (lit. 'Awake') winning Song of the Year and Radio Hit, and winning Producer of the Year (along with Kristofer Harris), while "Kādreiz" (lit. 'Once up a time') was nominated for Best Music Video. "Nomodā" (lit. 'Awake') finished third at the 2024 Muzikālā banka (lit. 'Musical Bank') awards. In 2024, the Latvian Music Producers Association announced the creation of the 2024 GAMMA awards, which celebrates "all aspects of the Latvian music industry". Noah was nominated for Male Solo Artist of the Year and Pop Artist of the year; his songs "Nomodā" (lit. 'Awake') and "Desmitiem Reižu" (lit. 'Dozens of Times') were both nominated for Hits of the Year and Radio Hit of the Year; and his concert at Palladium Riga was nominated for Musical Event of the Year and Live Performance/Concert of the Year.

In November 2024, Noah was selected as a semi-finalist to perform his English-language song "Romance isn't Dead" for the 2025 Supernova, which is used as the Latvian national selection for the Eurovision Song Contest. He advanced to the finals of Supernova, finishing 5th.

== Musical style ==
Noah began his career releasing extended plays over several years, stating that a debut album only happens once and he has waited until he developed a musical style that suits his ambitions, saying, "an artist needs a certain fan base to listen to it, just like a band or an artist needs to be confident in their sound and genre frameworks".

Noah was inspired by the musical tastes of his father, Valdis Indrišonoks, who is a professional musician; these influences include U2, Eric Clapton, and the Beatles. When talking about the difference between song writing in English and Latvian, he said these influences play a role in how he create melodies, phrase them and put them together, with English being more sonorous. He writes and records his music at a studio outside of Riga, Latvia that his father purchased when Noah was a child. He emphasizes having his father's studio space provides him an environment where he can express himself: "I often work alone here. It is a misconception that an artist has to work only when the muse has arrived. In fact, it's a real job, because you have to be able to generate ideas every day even when you don't want to. In my opinion, the muse can best be captured if you regularly work at the computer or play music."

Growing up in a musical household, he also gained a lot of experiences about the writing process and being able to surround himself with experienced musicians early in his career, which music critics notice about his live performances. Sandris Vanzovičs, the music reviewer for Neatkarīgā Rīta Avīze notes that Noah's experienced backing musicians creates a sound that makes Chris Noah seem like a musician straight out of the Western music scene; he has gained popularity outside of Latvia with his English language songs, especially in Estonia, however music critic Uldis Rudak said he has never cared for his music until he begin to sing in Latvian with his first single "Cik tālu vēl?" (lit. 'How far yet?').

== Discography ==
=== Albums ===
Title	Details
Atvadas nav skumjas, ja zinām, ka drīz tiksimies	Released: October 14, 2024; Label: Sony Music Finland; Format: Digital download

=== Extended plays ===
Title	Details
What About Tomorrow?	Released: April 26, 2017; Label: Format: Digital download
Distance	Released: March 20, 2020; Label: Sony Music Entertainment/Made in Baltics; Format: Digital download
Distance (deluxe)	Released: November 6, 2020; Label: Sony Music Entertainment/Made in Baltics; Format: Digital download
Red Light	Released: 2022; Label: Sony Music Finland; Format: Digital download

=== Singles ===
==== As lead artist ====
List of singles, with year, album and chart positions
Title	Year	Peak chart positions			Album or EP
Title	Year	LAT Air.	LAT Dom. Air.	LAT Stream.	Album or EP
"Had It All"	2015	—	*	*	Non-album singles
"You"	2016	—	*	*	Non-album singles
"Spark"	2017	—	*	*	What about Tomorrow?
"River"	2018	—	*	—	Non-album singles
"Fall Through"	2018	—	*	35	Non-album singles
"Inside Out"	2019	—	*	—	Non-album singles
"The Line"	2020	21	*	—	Distance
"This is the Night"	2020	—	*	—	Distance
"Sunboy"	2022	*	*	—	Red Light
"Only Yours"	2022	*	*	—	Red Light
"Take a Minute"	2023	—	3	—	Non-album single
"Cik Tālu Vēl?"	2023	2	1	—	Atvadas nav skumjas, ja zinām, ka drīz tiksimies
"Nomodā"	2024	6	1	—	Atvadas nav skumjas, ja zinām, ka drīz tiksimies
"Desmitiem reižu"	2024	11	1	—	Atvadas nav skumjas, ja zinām, ka drīz tiksimies
"Kādreiz"	2024	5	1	—	Atvadas nav skumjas, ja zinām, ka drīz tiksimies
"Mākslai vajag telpu"	2024	—	6	—	Atvadas nav skumjas, ja zinām, ka drīz tiksimies
"Romance Isn't Dead"	2025	—	—	—	Non-album singles
"Mēs pārtiekam viens no otra"	2025	12	4	—	Non-album singles
"Kā agrāk"	2026	13	2	—	Non-album singles
"Mīļākie bērni"	2026	11	2	—	Non-album singles
"—" denotes a recording that did not chart or was not released in that territory. "*" denotes that the chart did not exist at that time.

== Awards ==
The Annual Latvian Music Recording Awards (equivalent to the Grammy Awards) presents the Zelta Mikrofons (lit. 'Golden Microphones') awards to the best music recordings of all genres from the previous year, which are evaluated by a professional jury. Latvijas Radio presents the annual Muzikālās Banka (lit. 'Musical Bank') award to the most valuable pop and rock song, which is selected based on audience votes and evaluation by a professional jury.

In 2024, the Latvian Association of Performers and Producers (LaIPA) initiated the creation of a new award called GAMMA, that encompasses all aspects of the Latvian music industry and offers a new approach to recognizing industry excellence, representing and championing the industry throughout the year.

Year	Nominated work	Category	Award	Result	Notes	Ref.
2017	"You"		AKKA/LAA Copyright Infinity Award	Won		
2018	What About Tomorrow?	Best Debut	Latvian Music Recording Awards	Nominated		
2021	Distance	Best Pop Album	Latvian Music Recording Awards	Nominated		
2023	Red Light	Best Pop Album	Latvian Music Recording Awards	Nominated		
2023	"Sunboy"	Song of the Year	Latvian Music Recording Awards	Nominated		
2023	"Cik tālu vēl?" (lit. 'How far yet?')	Most Valuable Song	Muzikālā banka (lit. 'Musical Bank')	9th place		
2024	"Cik tālu vēl?" (lit. 'How far yet?')	Top Radio Hit	Latvian Music Recording Awards	Nominated		
2024	"Nomodā" (lit. 'Awake')	Most Valuable Song	Muzikālā banka (lit. 'Musical Bank')	3rd place		
2024	Himself	Male Solo Artist of the Year	GAMMA Awards	Nominated		
2024	Himself	Pop Artist of the Year	GAMMA Awards	Won		
2024	"Nomodā" (lit. 'Awake')	Hit of the Year	GAMMA Awards	Nominated		
2024	"Desmitiem reižu" (lit. 'Dozens of times')	Hit of the Year	GAMMA Awards	Nominated		
2024	"Nomodā" (lit. 'Awake')	Radio Hit of the Year	GAMMA Awards	Won		
2024	"Desmitiem reižu" (lit. 'Dozens of times')	Radio Hit of the Year	GAMMA Awards	Nominated		
2024	Concert at Palladium Riga	Musical Event of the Year	GAMMA Awards	Nominated		
2024	Concert at Palladium Riga	Live Performance/Concert of the Year	GAMMA Awards	Nominated		
2025	Atvadas nav skumjas, ja zinām, ka drīz tiksimies	Best Pop or Pop Rock Album of the Year	Latvian Music Recording Awards	Won		
2025	Atvadas nav skumjas, ja zinām, ka drīz tiksimies	Album of the Year	Latvian Music Recording Awards	Won		
2025	"Kādreiz"	Best Music Video	Latvian Music Recording Awards	Nominated		
2025	Self (with Kristofer Harris)	Producer of the Year	Latvian Music Recording Awards	Won		
2025	"Nomodā"	Song of the Year	Latvian Music Recording Awards	Won		
2025	"Nomodā"	Radio Hit	Latvian Music Recording Awards	Won		
