= Bia season 1 =

2019 Argentine television season

Bia
- Season 1
- Season 1 promotional poster
- No. of episodes: 60

Release
- Original network: Disney Channel Latin America
- Original release: Part 1: 24 June – 19 July 2019; Part 2: 19 August 2019 – 13 September 2019; Part 3: 14 October 2019 – 8 November 2019

Season chronology
- Next → Season 2

The first season of Argentine television series Bia was produced by Non Stop Producciones and Pegsa Group, and directed by Jorge Bechara and Daniel De Filippo, the season was first announced in August 2018 by Disney Channel Latin America. The season was first broadcast in Latin American on Disney Channel from 24 June 2019 to 8 November 2019 with a total of 60 episodes, divided into three parts of 20 episodes.

== Cast ==
=== Main ===
- Isabela Souza as Beatriz "Bia" Urquiza
- Julio Peña as Manuel Quemola
- Guido Messina as Alex Gutiérrez
- Andrea de Alba as Carmín Laguardia
- Giulia Guerrini as Chiara Callegri
- Agustina Palma as Celeste Quinterro
- Micaela Díaz as Daisy Durant
- Alan Madanes as Pietro Benedetto Jr.
- Luis Giraldo as Jhon Caballero
- Julia Argüelles as Mara Morales
- Daniela Trujillo as Isabel "Pixie" Ocaranta
- Esteban Velásquez as Guillermo Ruiz
- Rodrigo Rumi as Marcos Golden
- Fernando Dente as Victor Gutiérrez
- Gabriella Di Grecco as Helena Urquiza / Ana
- Rhener Freitas as Thiago Kunst
- Jandino as himself
- Valentina González as Aillén
- Sergio Surraco as Antonio Gutiérrez
- Estela Ribeiro as Alice Urquiza
- Alejandro Botto as Mariano Urquiza
- Mariela Pizzo as Paula Gutiérrez

=== Recurring ===
- Nicolás Domini as Lucas Gutiérrez
- Florencia Tassara as young Bia Urquiza
- Katja Martínez as Jasmin Carvajal
- Sebastián Sinnott as Charly
- Santiago Sapag as Milo
- Facundo Gambandé as Marcelo
- Simón Tobías as Hugo Landa "Indy House"
- Ana Carolina Valsagna as Florencia
- Mirela Payret as Lucía Quemola
- Nicole Luis as Soledad
- Mariana Redi as Luciana
- Camila Vaccarini as Valeria
- Daniela Améndola as Chloe

=== Guest ===
- Kevsho as himself
- Sebastián Villalobos as himself
- Daniela Calle as herself
- María José Garzón as herself
- Mario Ruiz as himself
- Mariano Muente as Claudio
- Ximena Palomino as Olivia
- Celeste Ianelli as herself
- Neira Mariel as Uma

== Episodes ==
No. overall	No. in season	Title	Original release date
Part 1
1	1	Episode 1	24 June 2019
Bia and her best friends, Celeste and Chiara, do everything they can to get to the Fundom's channel opening party; Alex and Manuel unknowingly take an interest in the same girl; a mysterious woman returns for answers. A memory impacts Bia and is the beginning of a big change in her life.
2	2	Episode 2	25 June 2019
Bia is thrilled after singing and remembering her sister; Manuel is determined to find the girl with the mysterious voice, but confusion pushes him out of his way; Alex receives an unexpected offer; Bia listens to a melody that makes her heart flutter.
3	3	Episode 3	26 June 2019
Bia, fascinated with a piano melody, wants to find the mysterious musician; Manuel approaches Mara, thinking that she is the girl who heard singing at the party; Alex is recruited by Carmín to be part of Laix.
4	4	Episode 4	27 June 2019
Bia discovers that Manuel heard her sing during the Fundom Fest and is amazed at the beautiful words that his voice directs. Later on, Bia has the idea of combining her talent with Daisy's to create an amazing video. Meanwhile, Manuel feels frustrated that Mara's melody doesn't convey the same feelings to him.
5	5	Episode 5	28 June 2019
The day comes for the release of videos from the Art section at Fundom; Bia has trouble finishing her video with Daisy. She sees for the first time a video that will bring her closer to Helena.
6	6	Episode 6	1 July 2019
Bia discovers that Manuel is the piano boy and he discovers that Bia is the voice girl. However, Manuel avoids her from intruding between her and Alex; Carmín and Alex are planning a collaborative video.
7	7	Episode 7	2 July 2019
Bia comes face to face with Manuel, but he avoids her; Alex invites Bia out and she accepts, but makes it clear that they are just friends.
8	8	Episode 8	3 July 2019
Alex helps Bia and invites her out. She accepts, but is confused because of Manuel.
9	9	Episode 9	4 July 2019
Bia goes out with Alex, and clarifies that they go out just as friends; an anonymous video in which Bia makes fun of Alex goes viral; Alex swears revenge.
10	10	Episode 10	5 July 2019
Bia prepares Fundom's collaborative streaming with her friends, but not everything goes as expected; Ana receives a very important message; Manuel and Bia get closer and closer.
11	11	Episode 11	8 July 2019
Alex swears revenge on Bia, and this creates a conflict between her and Manuel; Bia approaches the person responsible of the viral video in which they distorted her words.
12	12	Episode 12	9 July 2019
Carmín posts a video in which she accuses Bia of being a hater; Alex records a video in which he shows himself as a victim; Bia stays in the eye of the hurricane.
13	13	Episode 13	10 July 2019
Alex posts a video playing the victim and the plan works. Bia begins to suffer the consequences.
14	14	Episode 14	11 July 2019
Bia is getting closer to Manuel. And as for Alex, he also gets closer and closer to Carmín. However, a new video appears to cause confusion. Alex gives the finishing touch to revenge against Bia.
15	15	Episode 15	12 July 2019
The Urquiza family and the Gutiérrez family go to the record company and are about to meet; the master class will happen, but first the boys go to the republic to help; Alex consumes his revenge on Bia.
16	16	Episode 16	15 July 2019
A video in which Bia sings spreads. She feels very sad and disappointed with Manuel not only for betraying her trust, but for also taking away the only way to feel closer to her sister; Alex and Carmín's plan goes as expected; Manuel wants to regain Bia's confidence.
17	17	Episode 17	16 July 2019
Bia remains distant from Manuel; Víctor discovers the truth about the record company; Alex and Carmín get closer and closer.
18	18	Episode 18	17 July 2019
Manuel tries to work things out with Bia; Alex and Carmín go out together in secret; Ana discovers that Bia has not been able to sing in public since her sister died.
19	19	Episode 19	18 July 2019
Moondust's record proposal is revived; Thiago has a plan to put Ana and Bia in touch; Víctor makes a surprising discovery.
20	20	Episode 20	19 July 2019
Bia forgives Manuel, and they get closer and closer to each other. But the truth about the past and their families comes out.
Part 2
21	21	Episode 21	19 August 2019
After discovering that their families are rivals, Bia and Manuel try to maintain their friendship, but due to Paula's threats, Manuel is lost in what to do.
22	22	Episode 22	20 August 2019
Bia and Manuel make an important decision and face the consequences. Víctor and the Urquizas sign with the label, and he asks Bia to help him finish composing the song which Helena left incomplete.
23	23	Episode 23	21 August 2019
With Vera's help, Bia accepts Víctor's proposal while suffering from Manuel's distance. Chiara suspects that Jhon is the cobra. Mara publishes her first video in front of the cameras, infuriating Carmín.
24	24	Episode 24	22 August 2019
Bia distrusts Vera. Increasingly, Chiara is sure that Jhon is the Cobra. Jhon does not go to the Eletropower show with Daisy to talk to Celeste. Manuel and Bia continue to suffer from their distances. Bia receives a proposal from Marcos Golden.
25	25	Episode 25	23 August 2019
Alex makes a video using Carmín's idea, and this makes the two have a misunderstanding. Jhon asks Celeste to reveal her feelings, but she rejects him. Daisy and Jhon take the next step. Chiara and Celeste receive a proposal from Laix. Víctor realizes that there was a disagreement between Bia and Manuel, and forces a meeting between the two.
26	26	Episode 26	26 August 2019
Manuel joins Bia and Víctor to finish composing the song. Chiara and Celeste tell Bia about their proposal from Laix. Manuel listens to Ana singing the melody of Helena's song. Daisy and Chiara ask Jhon to confess that he is the cobra. Víctor tells Bia that she and Manuel should finish composing the song together.
27	27	Episode 27	27 August 2019
Bia and Manuel continue composing Helena's music, and this makes them get closer. The clues Chiara has put together to know who the cobra is lead to Pixie. Víctor pressures his father into revealing a secret about the accident. Pietro and Daisy distrust Ana. Celeste still doesn't reveal what she hides to her friends. Bia makes a decision about the presentation at CyberGold.
28	28	Episode 28	28 August 2019
The Fundom girls suspect they have discovered Celeste's secret. Bia and Celeste find a tape related with the day of the accident in Helena's bag. Thiago drops his wallet in the park, Victor finds it and goes to the Kunst Residence to return it. Marcos Golden decides that Chiara and Celeste will sing on CyberGold. The Fundom guys suspect a new person is the cobra. Alex threatens to say that Helena is to blame for the accident to his followers if Bia, Chiara and Celeste sing at the party.
29	29	Episode 29	29 August 2019
With Alex's blackmail, Celeste tells Bia that they won't sing at the party so as not to harm the Urquizas. Bia decides to talk to Marcos Golden. Manuel tries to convince Víctor to play again. Marcos Golden forbids Alex to sing on CyberGold. Celeste's secret is revealed. Mara's popularity is increasing fast, which irritates Carmin. Chiara and Celeste will sing at the party. Daisy and Jhon come up with a plan to find out if Valeria is the cobra. Bia and Manuel are getting closer and closer.
30	30	Episode 30	30 August 2019
Mara warns Bia and Manuel about Alex's hatred. Alex tells his mother about the approach of Manuel and Bia. Antonio catches Paula banning and threatening to expel Manuel from his home if he attends CyberGold. Carmín tries to convince Marcos Golden to let Alex sing. Ana and Bia meet for the first time. Through Vera, Ana moves and convinces Bia to sing, making her remember a conversation she had with Helena. Manuel ignores Paula's message and goes to the hidden CyberGold. Ana drops her gold scarf at the party. The negative comments from Carmin's new video infuriates Marcos. Jhon and Daisy establish their relationship. Bia and Manuel take the next step.
31	31	Episode 31	2 September 2019
Bia finds Ana's golden scarf at the party and speculates that Helena is alive. Paula expels Manuel from her home. Bia tells Chiara and Celeste about her discovery. Due to the controversial video, Carmín begins to lose followers. Pietro questions Thiago about Ana's secrets.
32	32	Episode 32	3 September 2019
Bia begins to investigate Helena's whereabouts. Manuel seeks shelter in the Kunst Residence. Knowing what happened, Bia talks to Manuel about the future of their relationship. Paula and Antonio discuss Manuel's departure and end up revealing an important secret. Bia and Celeste find a clue.
33	33	Episode 33	4 September 2019
Upon discovering that Thiago and Ana were in CyberGold's VIP Room, Bia decides to talk to them about new clues of the Golden Scarf. Due to the comments of her last video, Carmín breaks her association with Mara. Pixie hands the tape material to Bia.
34	34	Episode 34	5 September 2019
Bia, Chiara and Celeste watch the video of the tape found in Helena's bag. Carmín's popularity decreases and affects her relationships with her biggest sponsor. Ana through Vera, makes an appointment with Bia. Manuel's mother calls Antonio. Paula discovers that Víctor has stopped going to physiotherapy. Jhon posts a video of Pixie singing. Daisy and Pietro discover something about Ana. The Urquizas find a painful banner in front of their building which deems Helena a murderer.
35	35	Episode 35	6 September 2019
Pixie asks Jhon to delete his video from the networks. Marcos Golden shows interest in Jhon Caballero. Bia, Chiara and Celeste open their channel (Paint the Music). The Urquizas suffer from seeing the banner in front of their house. Bia tells Manuel about the banner, and he deduces that it was Alex. Mara receives a proposal from Laix. Manuel confronts Alex about the banner, but he truthfully denies this accusation. The cobra posts a video that further harms Carmín. Bia makes a decision about her relationship with Manuel.
36	36	Episode 36	9 September 2019
Bia and Manuel suffer from their choices. The Cobra's video further damages Carmin's reputation. Bia goes to Laix to confront Alex. The boys at Fundom suspect Pixie is hiding something. Víctor puts even more pressure on Antonio. Ana makes an important decision. Jhon gets a call from Laix. Daisy is increasingly focused on rehearsals for Festiritmo. Bia catches Mara and Manuel together.
37	37	Episode 37	10 September 2019
Bia is surprised by the relationship between Mara and Manuel. Daisy warns Jhon about Laix. Bia shows Alice the audio Vera sent her. Carmín realizes that Alex is avoiding her. Manuel and Bia suffer from their distances. Daisy and Jhon discover Pixie's secret.
38	38	Episode 38	11 September 2019
Even though everyone around her says not to raise expectations, Bia increasingly believes that Helena is alive. Carmín suffers the consequences of her separation with Mara. Manuel returns to live with the Gutierrezes, because of this, Ana changes her decision. Daisy tells the girls what she found out about Pixie's past. Víctor asks Bia for Vera's contact. Mara invites Bia to a collaboration.
39	39	Episode 39	12 September 2019
Víctor manages to communicate with Vera. The Festiritmo is getting closer and closer, which makes Daisy anxious and nervous. Mara invites Manuel to sing with her. Bia and her friends ask Alice for help on how to act with Pixie. Seeing Manuel and Mara together, Bia suspects that Manuel has already forgotten her. Pixie listens to the people at Fundom talking about what happened to her.
40	40	Episode 40	13 September 2019
Pixie is devastated that her friends had investigated her past without her consent. Alex and Carmín make an important decision about their relationship. Meanwhile, Daisy makes her presentation to the Festiritmo jury. Víctor tells Paula a secret that can change his view of the accident. At Laix, Jhon opens his channel. When Bia finally changes her mind about her relationship with Manuel, an unexpected event may cause her to back down.
Part 3
41	41	Episode 41	14 October 2019
Due to what happened at Streaming, Bia decides to break off her relationship once and for all with Manuel. Pixie does not return to Fundom. After telling Paula the truth about the accident, she angrily reacts in disbelief and Víctor is threatened by his father into staying quiet. Carmín exposes Alex to his followers. Bia and Manuel meet.
42	42	Episode 42	15 October 2019
Given all that has happened, Bia tells Manuel that there is nothing else between them. Daisy is concerned to discover that Marcos is a jury of Festiritmo. Bia, Chiara and Celeste receive a new proposal from Laix. Víctor tells Paula about the threat he received from Antonio. Ana calls Urquiza residence.
43	43	Episode 43	16 October 2019
When Bia answers the call, Ana is discouraged. Victor still doesn't get along with his parents. Daisy tells Pietro that she was uncomfortable with the interview for Festiritmo. Chiara receives a proposal from Marcos Golden. Jhon lets Laix interfere more and more with his image. Manuel listens to Bia tell Celeste that she feels something very strong for him. Alex warns Jandino about Carmín. Daisy performs in the second phase of Festiritmo. On her way to an art exhibition, Alice sees something that surprises her.
44	44	Episode 44	17 October 2019
Daisy advances to the next phase of the competition, but increasingly her appearance bothers the next. A cousin of Antonio decides to pay a visit to the Gutierrez and brings with him new mysteries among the family. Chiara continues to carry out projects for Laix in secret. Alex finds a sweatshirt on Carmím's coat rack that can incriminate her by the banner. When they conclude the song left by Helena and Víctor, Manuel invites Bia on a date.
45	45	Episode 45	18 October 2019
Carmín convinces Alex that she was not responsible for the banner. Pixie returns to Fundom and tells what really happened to her in the past. Celeste tells Bia and Chiara that she is going to consult with the psychologist. Víctor suspects that his father is hiding more than one secret. Marcos uses Chiara's voice as a playback to promote an influencer. Víctor begins to suspect that Alex really isn't to blame for the banner. Daisy makes a discovery about her participation in Festiritmo. About to meet Manuel, Bia watches the new 'I Know What You Did' video that could hurt her relationship with him again.
46	46	Episode 46	21 October 2019
The mood between Bia and Manuel cools with the recent 'I Know What You Did' video. Daisy gives up on participating in the Festiritmo. Bia and Víctor suspect that Mara was responsible for the video. Paula discovers that Víctor will return to physical therapy with Vera's help. Chiara is displeased with Marcos Golden due to the latest events. Víctor and Alex distrust their family's past. Bia finds a paper with Helena's handwriting.
47	47	Episode 47	22 October 2019
Daisy is confused about her decision. Alex discovers a new clue about the banner person. Víctor reveals to Thiago that he is in love with Vera. Bia continues with her internal conflicts over Manuel. Daisy goes back to Festiritmo. By gathering the clues she has collected, Bia is close to finding Helena.
48	48	Episode 48	23 October 2019
Ana spots Bia and manages to escape without her noticing. Daisy and Chloe advance to the Festiritmo final. Fundom is visited by Calle and Poché, who talk and give an interview to Kevsho telling about their lives and Cyberbullying. Daisy is motivated by Calle and Poché, who help her with a choreography for the competition. Aillén is Laix's new intern. Marcos Golden calls for an exchange of favors to remove the video in Chiara's voice, which involves a collaboration between Bia and Alex.
49	49	Episode 49	24 October 2019
Bia gets reflective about singing with Alex. More mysteries about Ana's past are revealed. Víctor is increasingly in love with Vera. Manuel questions Paula and Antonio about their relations with his mother. Alex tells Manuel that he and Bia will be singing together. A video of Pietro and Chiara cooking is published on the Fundom Channel. Jandino seeks support at Fundom for the making of the charity video. Alex unravels the mystery of the banner. Daisy performs at the finale of Festiritmo. Bia decides to sing with Alex.
50	50	Episode 50	25 October 2019
Daisy amazes and thrills everyone with her speech and her decision at the Festiritmo final. Vera and Víctor put an end to their communications. With Daisy's revelations, Marcos Golden and the Festiritmo producers suffer hatred on the internet. Bia records a video hoping to make her sister reappear. Manuel understands the reasons for the collaboration between Bia and Alex. Pietro gets upset with Chiara because of the video. An unexpected visit arrives at the Gutierrez house. Ana meets Bia in the park and calls her.
51	51	Episode 51	28 October 2019
Ana loses her courage and hides behind a bush. Bia and Manuel present "Primer Amor" to Víctor. Lucía's arrival brings tension between Paula and Antonio. Alex and Bia fall out in rehearsals for the collaboration. Pietro remains upset with the video. Bia tells Manuel about her discoveries and her hope that Helena is alive. Marcos' bad repercussion makes him angry. Carmín accuses Aillén of being the cobra after finding that she recorded her and Mara arguing. Ana finds out why Daisy and Pietro have been strangers to her lately. Bia's father finds the paper with Helena's handwriting.
52	52	Episode 52	29 October 2019
Ana tells Daisy and Pietro that she is the environmental activist they have always suspected. Lucía is determined to tell Manuel the truth, but Paula doesn't want to involve Alex and Víctor. Carmín refuses to record the #Carmino video Marcos had asked him to do. The Fundom girls decide to make a collaborative video to further enhance Daisy's inspiring message. Celeste confesses to Chiara her feelings for Jhon. Jandino decides to leave Laix. Bia's parents consider the possibility that Helena survived the accident. Manuel and Bia approach each other again.
53	53	Episode 53	30 October 2019
Bia and Manuel share their feelings. In the rehearsals for the video, Alex and Bia have a disagreement and everything gets worse when Marcos decides to follow closely. Gradually more people join the guys from Fundom for the collaborative video. Pietro and Chiara approach. Listening to a conversation between Antonio and Lucía, Paula discovers a new secret from her husband and makes an important decision. Daisy tells the truth from the beginning to Jhon. Manuel has the clues to unravel a great mystery.
54	54	Episode 54	31 October 2019
Through Vera, Ana discovers that Manuel is also helping Bia in the search for Helena, and manages to disguise her handwriting. The hashtag #SoyComoSoy grows bigger and bigger, which hurts Marcos Golden's post at Laix, because of that, he falls into a mental breakdown and is sent to the hospital. Daisy and Jhon understand each other and reaffirm their feelings. Celeste helps Pixie overcome her fears. The Gutierrez in crisis seek to unravel their mysteries and those who know them become accomplices. The Fundom boys team up to stream.
55	55	Episode 55	1 November 2019
Filled with inspiration and motivation, the Fundom staff records streaming that rises even further to #SoyComoSoy. Ana and Thiago get even closer. The cobra releases a video that can hurt Carmine emotionally and popularly. Lucía makes a decision that affects Manuel's future. Ana puts her plan into motion so that Bia will give up looking for her.
56	56	Episode 56	4 November 2019
Ana's plan works, because of this, Bia is saddened to have raised expectations. Daisy tells Celeste and Bia that their dating with Jhon seems to be without connection. The kiss between Thiago and Ana affects their friendship. Jhon decides to leave Laix. Marcos Golden returns to Laix with a curious personality. Manuel leaving for Madrid saddens Victor. Bia and Manuel are able to meet, but their problems may disrupt their destiny once again.
57	57	Episode 57	5 November 2019
Manuel tells Bia about his mother's decision. Thiago tries to enthuse Victor to play basketball with the help of a paratlete. Paula threatens Alice, and this causes Mariano to call the Gutierrez for a chat. Daisy is increasingly convinced that Ana feels something for Thiago. Manuel tries to convince his mother that he can live in the Kunst Residence. Bia finds Olivia's cell phone at Fundom, and decides to call to try to warn her.
58	58	Episode 58	6 November 2019
The girls begin to suspect Olivia. Lucía is unconvinced and the decision to take Manuel back home remains intact. Jhon makes a decision about the tour. Chiara reveals to her best friends that she is enjoying Pietro. The Urquizas and the Gutierrez meet as planned, but things end up in such a bad way. When Paula leaves in a rush, she accidentally pushes Alice to the ground, breaking her arm. Daisy and Jhon have a conversation about their relationship. Bia and Manuel lock a lock with their initials on the padlock bridge and make promises about their love. Losing followers every day, Carmín can no longer recognize who she really is. The Fundom crowd adds to a new proposal from the #SoyComoSoy movement.
59	59	Episode 59	7 November 2019
The "BeU" project comes up at Fundom, but the boys have to run with preparations for the big party. Bia's mother tells her about what happened during their encounter with the Gutierrez. Thiago decides to declare himself to Ana. Celeste lets the momentum flow and confirms her feelings for Jhon. Bia overhears a conversation between her parents about the Gutierrez conflict that changes her opinion about Manuel's departure. Marcos Golden manages to bring Jandino back to Laix. Lucía allows Manuel to stay in Buenos Aires, but when he goes to tell Bia, yet another conspiracy of fate turns against his romance.
60	60	Episode 60	8 November 2019
As Bia tries to decide on her love for Manuel, everyone is looking forward to the BeU party. Marcos Golden devises a plan to take over the Fundom. Carmín decides to move away from social networks and end with So Carmín. Paula makes a decision about her relationship. Ana remembers that it was not her who drove at the time of the accident. Manuel and Bia affirm their love. Even with the appearance of Laix's influencers, everyone sings and has fun at the BeU party and shows their authenticity and positivity. Paula tells the truth about Manuel to Alex. At the end of the day, Helena's music and golden scarf can show the way Bia has always tried to find.
