= Agustina Palma =

Argentine actress (born 1995)

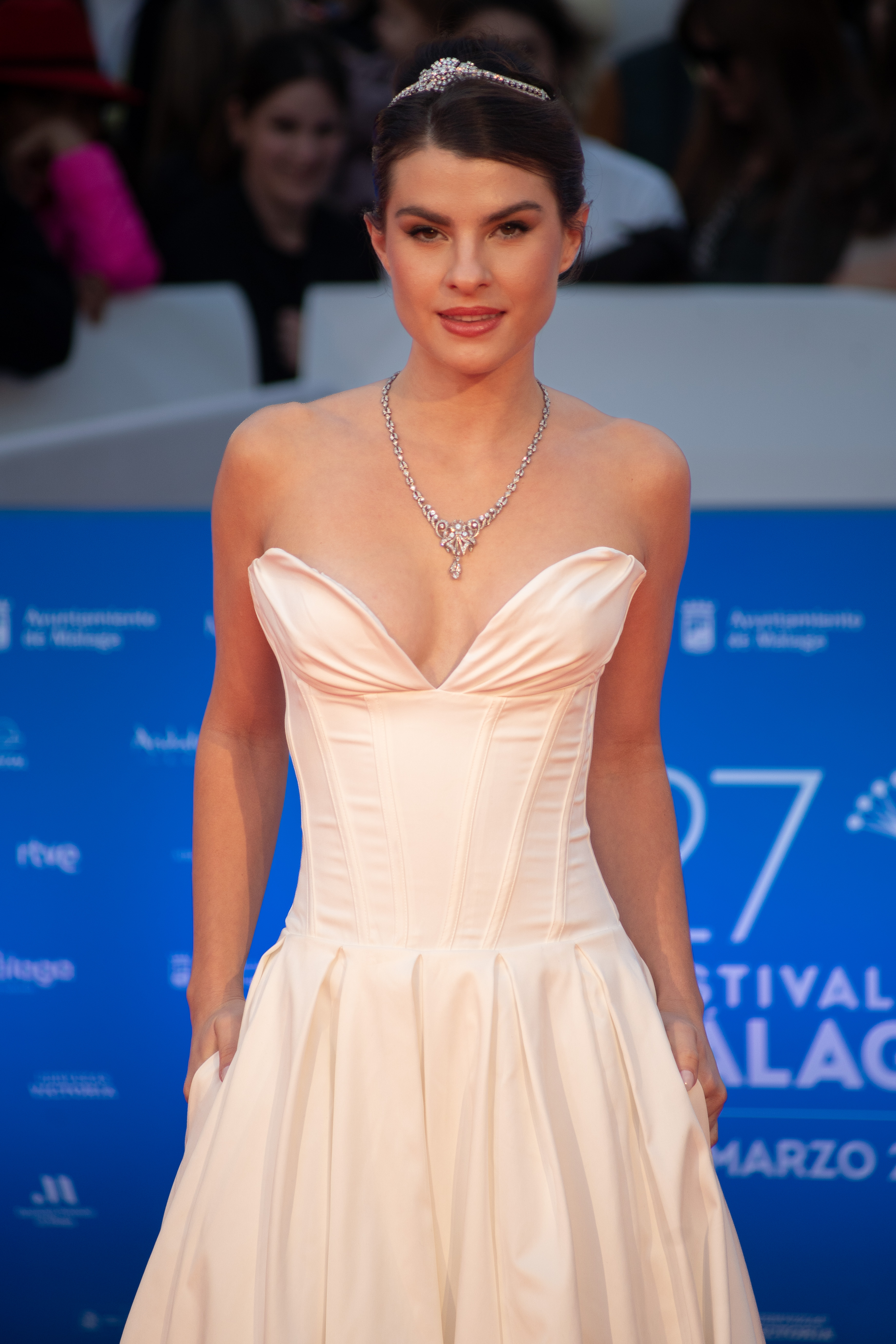
- Palma in 2024
- Born: Camila Agustina Palma Espejo; 11 August 1999 (age 27); San Miguel de Tucumán, Argentina
- Occupation: Actress

Camila Agustina Palma Espejo (born 11 August 1995) is an Argentine actress. She has appeared on television series such as Rincón de Luz, Floricienta, Once, Secreto bien guardado, and Bia.

== Biography ==
Agustina Palma was born and raised in San Miguel de Tucumán, to parents Mauricio Palma and actress Constanza Espejo. There she attended acting, singing, and dancing workshops.

In 2003, at age 8, she participated in a casting by Cris Morena for the telenovela Rincón de Luz, and obtained a recurring role. Two years later she joined Floricienta, playing Bárbara.

In 2009, she played Julieta in the telenovela Consentidos. In 2015, she made a special appearance on the fiction series Esperanza mía. During this period she also studied architecture at the University of Buenos Aires.

From 2017 to 2018, she was part of the main cast of the Disney XD series Once, playing Martina Markinson, the co-star's girlfriend. Two years later she co-starred in the CINE.AR Play series Secreto bien guardado.

In 2019 and 2020 she was part of the main cast of Bia, a Disney Channel Latin America series, where she played Celeste, one of the protagonist's best friends. She reprised her role in the Disney+ special Bia: un mundo al revés, which brought the series to a close.

In the latter year she moved to Madrid to continue her acting career. In 2021, she starred in the play Cariñito, alongside Alba Rico Navarro and Adriana Salas. In 2024, she played Valeria Delger in the TV series Máxima.

== Filmography ==
=== Television ===
Year	Title	Character	Notes
2003	Rincón de luz	Laura's friend	Special appearance
2005	Floricienta	Bárbara	
2009–2010	Consentidos	Julieta	
2015	Esperanza mía	Extra	Special appearance
2017–2018	Once	Martina Markinson	Main cast
2019	Secreto bien guardado	Irene Peres Kiev	Main cast
2019–2020	Bia	Celeste Quintero	Main cast
2021	Bia: un mundo al revés	Celeste Quintero	TV special
2021	Cariñito	Lola	Adaptation of the play
2024	Máxima	Valeria Delger (ages 18–30)	

=== Theater ===
Year	Title	Character	Director
2021	Cariñito	Lola	Ezequiel Tronconi
2021	La parka	Guadalupe	Diego Oria

== Discography ==
=== Soundtracks ===
Year	Song	Album
2018	"Atrápame si puedes" (with Paulina Vetrano, Luan Brum, and Sebastián Athié)	Atrápame si puedes
2019	"Tengo una canción" (with Giulia Guerrini and Isabela Souza)	Así yo soy
2019	"La vida te devuelve" (with the cast of Bia)	Así yo soy
2019	"Si tú estás conmigo" (with the cast of Bia)	Así yo soy
2019	"Hasta el final" (with Isabela Souza and Giulia Guerrini)	Si vuelvo a nacer
2020	"Grita" (with Isabela Souza, Julio Peña Fernández, Guido Messina, Andrea De Alba, Giulia Guerrini, Julia Argüelles, Jandino, Micaela Díaz, Alan Madanes, Daniela Trujillo, Rhener Freitas, Gabriela di Grecco, Fernando Dente, Rodrigo Rumi, Esteban Velásquez, and Valentina González)	Grita
2020	"Aquí me encontrarás" (with Isabela Souza, Julio Peña Fernández, Guido Messina, Andrea De Alba, Giulia Guerrini, Julia Argüelles, Jandino, Micaela Díaz, Alan Madanes, Daniela Trujillo, Rhener Freitas, Gabriela di Grecco, Fernando Dente, Rodrigo Rumi, Esteban Velásquez, and Valentina González)	Grita
2020	"Voy" (with Isabela Souza, Gabriella di Grecco, Andrea De Alba, Giulia Guerrini, Julia Argüelles, Micaela Díaz, Daniela Trujillo, and Valentina González)	Grita
2020	"Voy por lo que quiero" (with Isabela Souza and Giulia Guerrini)	Grita
2021	"Es un juego" (with Isabela Souza, Julio Peña Fernández, Guido Messina, Andrea De Alba, Giulia Guerrini, Julia Argüelles, Jandino, Micaela Díaz, Alan Madanes, Daniela Trujillo, Rhener Freitas, Gabriela di Grecco, Fernando Dente, Rodrigo Rumi, Esteban Velásquez, André Lamoglia, and Valentina González)	Un mundo al revés
2021	"Quiero bailar" (with Isabela Souza, Julio Peña Fernández, Guido Messina, Andrea De Alba, Giulia Guerrini, Julia Argüelles, Jandino, Micaela Díaz, Alan Madanes, Daniela Trujillo, Rhener Freitas, Gabriela di Grecco, Fernando Dente, Rodrigo Rumi, Esteban Velásquez, André Lamoglia, and Valentina González)	Un mundo al revés

=== Collaborations ===
Year	Song
2018	"Solo tú" (with Matías Ferreira)
