= Secrets of Summer =

2022 Argentine television series

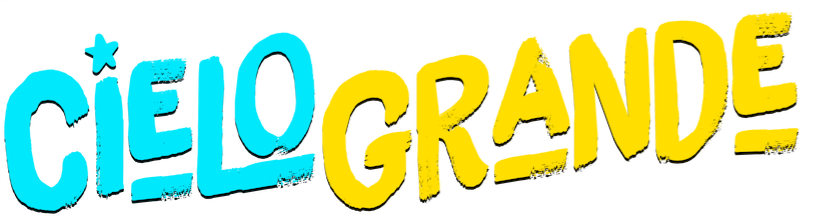
- Spanish: Cielo grande
- Genre: Musical; Romance; Mystery
- Created by: Jorge Edelstein
- Written by: Jorge Edelstein; Celeste Lambert; Paula Velayos; Clara Charrúa
- Directed by: Mauro Scandolari
- Starring: Pilar Pascual; Abril Di Yorio; Víctor Varona; Guido Messina; Francisco Bass; Giulia Guerrini; Thaís Rippel; Luan Brum; Fernando Monzo; Juan Monzo; Agustín Pardella; Mariel Percossi; Byron Barbieri; Martín Tecchi; Débora Nishimoto
- Country of origin: Argentina
- Original language: Spanish
- No. of seasons: 2
- No. of episodes: 19

Production
- Executive producer: Pablo Ferreiro
- Production locations: Tigre, Buenos Aires
- Cinematography: Federico Rivarés
- Editors: Laureano Rizzo; Lucrecia Caramagna; Sebastián Polze; Alejo Oliva
- Production company: Non Stop

Original release
- Network: Netflix
- Release: February 16 – December 30, 2022

Related
- Go! Live Your Way; Bia; O11CE

Secrets of Summer (Spanish: Cielo grande) is an Argentine musical streaming television series created by Jorge Edelstein, directed by Mauro Scandolari, produced by Non Stop and released by Netflix. The series stars Pilar Pascual along with Abril Di Yorio, Víctor Varona and Guido Messina, as well as Francisco Bass, Giulia Guerrini, Thaís Rippel, Luan Brum, Fernando Monzo, Juan Monzo, Agustín Pardella, Mariel Percossi, Byron Barbieri, Martín Tecchi and Débora Nishimoto.

The first season of eleven episodes was released on 16 February 2022. The show was renewed for a second and final season, which was released on 30 December 2022.

On 17 June 2023, Pili Pascual confirmed that the series will not be returning for a third season.

== Plot ==
A series that combines action, mystery, romance and endearing musical moments, which tells the story of a group of teenagers who work to save an old hotel lost in the middle of the Argentine Delta. Cielo Grande brings together childhood memories, family secrets and unforgettable moments in the middle of an exciting wakeboarding competition.

== Cast ==
=== Main ===
- Pilar Pascual as Stefania "Steffi" Navarro
- Abril Di Yorio as Luz Aguilar
- Víctor Varona as Antonio "Tony"
- Guido Messina as Julián
- Francisco Bass as Ron Navarro Lavalle
- Giulia Guerrini as Natasha Rossi (Note: Giulia Guerrini is credited as a series regular from 1x04 onwards.)
- Thaís Rippel as Natalia "Naty" (season 1)
- Luan Brum as Carlos "Charlie" Santos
- Fernando Monzo as himself (Note: Fernando Monzo is credited as a series regular from 1x02 onwards.)
- Juan Monzo as himself (Note: Juan Monzo is credited as a series regular from 1x02 onwards.)
- Agustín Pardella as Noda (season 1)
- Mariel Percossi as Matrix (season 1; guest season 2) & Wonder (season 2) (Note: Mariel Percossi is credited as a series regular from 1x02 onwards.)
- Byron Barbieri as Ian Navarro (season 1; recurring season 2)
- Martín Tecchi as Augusto Montero
- Débora Nishimoto as Irene (season 1) (Note: Débora Nishimoto is credited as a series regular from 1x04 onwards.)
- Jimena La Torre as Cynthia Aguilar (season 2; recurring season 1)
- Pasquale Di Nuzzo as Oliver (season 2)
- Carlos Contreras as Santiago "Santi" (season 2)
- Mirta Márquez as Leonor Campos (season 2)
- Cristina Alberó as Rita (season 2)

=== Recurring ===
- Juana Masse as Luz (child) (season 1)
- Benjamín Otero as Julián (child) (season 1)
- Juan Salinas as Ron Navarro (teenager) (season 1)
- Camila Geringer as Cynthia Aguilar (teenager) (season 1)
- Denise Cotton as Dra. Visero (season 1)
- Bárbara Pérez as herself (season 2)
- Martina San Felipe as Emily Aragón (season 2)
- Sofía Grimau as Ruth Márquez (season 2)
- Sergio Bermejo as the engineer hired by Oliver and Natasha (season 2)

== Episodes ==
Season	Episodes	Originally released
1	11	16 February 2022
2	8	30 December 2022

=== Season 1 (2022) ===
No. overall	No. in season	Title	Directed by	Written by	Original release date
1	1	"Un Nuevo Verano"	Mauro Scandolari	Jorge Edelstein & Celeste Lambert	16 February 2022
After 12 years, the Cielo Grande hotel revives the annual wakeboarding competition which draws the attention of Mexican athlete Steffi Navarro, who travels all the way to Buenos Aires to sign herself up, but also to uncover a family secret after reading a letter from Paula, her late stepmother. Luz, a longtime employee at the hotel, is conceded the rights by Augusto, its owner, to reopen the Sky Vibes, a karaoke bar that everyone frequented 20 years ago, although the hotel is going through some economic issues regarding a debt that is to be paid to the bank. Steffi and Luz meet and quickly become friends. She also makes acquaintaces with Julián, Luz's childhood friend and Augusto's nephew, wakeboarding instructor Charly and newcomer Naty. Noda, the hotel's nearly clueless desk clerk immediately alerts an unknown person about Steffi's presence. Steffi's father and former wakeboard champion, Ron Lavalle, and her technology-savvy brother Ian arrive at the hotel as well, much to Steffi's chagrin.
2	2	"Recuerdos de Sky Vibes"	Mauro Scandolari	Jorge Edelstein & Celeste Lambert	16 February 2022
Steffi still refuses to talk to Ron or Ian, but she agrees to let them stay as long as they don't publicly acknowledge each other as family. The Monzo twins arrive at Cielo Grande alongside their hot-tempered gothic agent Matrix to serve as their sponsor. However, after Nati accidentally makes her angry and Luz bluntly tells her how rude she was to her, Matrix reneges on the deal and tears up the already signed contract. One of the twins develops a crush on Steffi who doesn't return his feelings. Luz opens up to Steffi about her family as her father abandoned her and she was raised by her mother. Steffi also tells Luz that she was raised by her grandparents and never had a chance to meet her birth mother. Steffi tries figuring out what Ron is hiding. Luz and Julián talk about the good old days back at Sky Vibes while he comforts her over the Matrix situation.
3	3	"Friendzone"	Mauro Scandolari	Jorge Edelstein & Celeste Lambert	16 February 2022
Julián leans in to kiss Luz, but she gets cold feet and leaves; he talks to Charly about it and tells Julián that it might be a case of friendzone. Augusto informs Luz that the bank has rejected the payment and with a very little amount of competitors the hotel would be forced to shut down. Matrix threatens to leave Cielo Grande over the "poor" treatment she's been receiving from the staff. Luz is revealed to be attracted to Tony, Steffi's best friend and wakeboard coach, who only saw her as a friend due their age gap. On the Monzo Twins' request, Matrix apologizes to Luz for her behaviour and they decide to stay. She and Noda also bond over their favorite heavy metal band Toxic Garbage. Steffi finds out that Ron met a woman who isn't her mother. The competition is back on track thanks to Steffi's post and Luz's efforts to get Matrix to change her mind. Ian finds his mother's letter to Steffi.
4	4	"Una nueva competidora"	Mauro Scandolari	Jorge Edelstein & Celeste Lambert	16 February 2022
Steffi sneaks into Augusto's office and steals the guests's records to look into the woman's identity, finding a message that connects her to Ron. Tony asks Ron about meeting Steffi's mother at Cielo Grande but he becomes overwhelmed and gives some vague answers about it. Juan, one of the twins, tries unsuccessfully to win over Steffi, but she and Julián have more of a good connection. The team struggles to give the finishing touches to Sky Vibes before its official opening. Natasha Rossi, Steffi's arch-rival, joins the ranks of female wakeboarders for the competition. Angered by her presence, Steffi decides to end her vacations and start training on a regular basis.
5	5	"¿Quién es esa chica?"	Mauro Scandolari	Jorge Edelstein & Celeste Lamber	16 February 2022
Steffi instructs Ian to identify the woman in the photo, on the condition that Ron mustn't find out about this; although he doesn't find any useful means. Julián takes the stressed Steffi on a peaceful river trip to get her mind off Natasha. A former member of her team, Natasha wanted to cut Steffi out and Tony was completely against it, which led to her and Steffi's rivalry. Augusto informs Luz that Cielo Grande will be forced to shut down if the payment isn't met. Matrix mistakenly assumes that Steffi has a crush on Noda after hearing a coded message meant for his unknown contact. The Sky Vibes karaoke is finally reopened and with everyone in attendance. However, when it is the Monzo twins's turn, a temporary blackout occurs mid-song, causing everyone to leave abruptly, leaving Luz saddened that their efforts were for nothing. While Ian is asleep, Ron finds the photo of the woman in his possession.
6	6	"Noche de citas"	Mauro Scandolari	Jorge Edelstein & Celeste Lamber	16 February 2022
The woman in the photo is revealed to be Luz's mother, Cynthia. Despite Sky Vibes's failure, the group is overjoyed to hear that the Twins's video has surpassed the views even with the blackout and they decide to both create a channel to upload singing videos and create a sponsorship page meant for everyone to collaborate and save the hotel through collective fundraising. Charly tries to tell Naty how he feels, but she only sees him as a friend and admits to having a crush on a girl, who turns out to be Luz; she is oblivious to this because of her closeness to Tony. Julián goes on a date with Steffi while Natasha goes with Juan and Fer. Juan fears that Natasha might be manipulating Fer; Charly, echoing his previous encounter with Naty, gives him some meaningful advice. Ron confronts Steffi about her investigation and she demands that he tell her the truth.
7	7	"Problemas inesperados"	Mauro Scandolari	Jorge Edelstein & Celeste Lamber	16 February 2022
Ron reveals to Steffi that he met her mother Lyn at Cielo Grande, but Steffi's grandparents did not approve the relationship due to her coming from a poor background. Following her death, they kept making up a story about Lyn which was completely unconvincing for Steffi and, even after they died as well, Ron was afraid that Steffi would hate him if he told her the truth; Steffi says that she would never hate him. Ron also claims that he doesn't remember Luz's mother. Steffi then tries to search online any pivotal information about Lyn, but she finds nothing. Steffi's distraction over her family's past causes her to accidentally crash into a log and hit her head hard during a wakeboard training session. As the group tends to her, Luz notices a birthmark Steffi has that matches hers. Luz finds out that Ron is Steffi's father and Steffi confides in her the possibility of the two of them being sisters.
8	8	"Pájaro deja el nido"	Mauro Scandolari	Jorge Edelstein & Celeste Lamber	16 February 2022
Steffi has managed to recover but is advised to rest a day more if she is to resume training. As she has no recollection of the previous day, Tony helps her by having Ian use his drone to record an aerial shot of the Northern Channel for Steffi to get acquainted with before the competition. Charly and Naty clash over the latter's idea of including butterflies alongside sharks for the channel's promotional video; Charly even angers her more by testing if she was fine without including the butterflies. Steffi and Luz team up to dig further into her past and have Noda drive them over to Luz's mother's house to get some information from her. Noda tips off his secret contact, revealed to be Ron who instructs him to drag Steffi out of the house. Noda tricks them into believing that a fire has started at the hotel, with Cynthia following suit.
9	9	"¿Verdad o consecuencia?"	Mauro Scandolari	Jorge Edelstein & Celeste Lamber	16 February 2022
Steffi and Luz hear some shocking truths: Cynthia and Ron are revealed to be Steffi and Luz's respective mother and father, meaning that both of them are sisters, but Ron didn't know about Luz as his parents made him believe that Cynthia did not love Steffi while in turn they told Cynthia that Ron abandoned her and Luz, while also convincing her that separating both sisters was for the best. Steffi is appalled to hear this as she was previously told that her mother was dead and such "Lyn" was made up by her grandparents, with Ron going along with the lie. Luz is also disappointed on Cynthia for hiding from her that Steffi is her sister. Ron and Cynthia talk about the aftermath of their respective actions. Charly apologizes to Naty for downplaying her idea and adds the butterflies alongside the sharks to make up for his previous behaviour before they finally post the video. The order of participants by rank reveals that Steffi is the last female competitor after Natasha. Despite their anger at their parents, Steffi and Luz focus on the competition and Julián, alongside Tony, takes both of them to a secret spot of his for camping and a meditation session he hosts. At nightfall, Steffi thanks Julián for everything he did for her; they kiss.
10	10	"¡Summer Crush!"	Mauro Scandolari	Jorge Edelstein & Celeste Lamber	16 February 2022
The day of the Summer Crush competition finally arrives; Charly hosts the event while Naty is in charge of handing out the scores of the wakeboarders of every rank. The event goes smooth sailing with the Save Cielo platform in which donations are made for the hotel to prevent its closure, with the Monzo twins and surprisingly Ron donating as much as they can. It is Natasha's turn and she does an almost perfect run that prompts Steffi to come up with a trick under the sleeve in case that happened; Natasha scores 96 points. Although the impressive 720 that Steffi does is met with thunderous applauses, Steffi only scores 95 points behind Natasha, so she is named as the winner of the competition instead of Steffi. Despite the loss, Steffi is grateful for everything Cielo Grande has taught her and having her family back; Natasha is unmoved by this. Charly then announces that the Sky Vibes party will begin in a few minutes, addressing the virtual crowd to stay tuned.
11	11	"Save Cielo"	Mauro Scandolari	Jorge Edelstein & Celeste Lamber	16 February 2022
The Sky Vibes party becomes a success with the performances of the Monzo twins, Steffi and her friends; Julián and Steffi start a romantic relationship. Thanks to the streaming, Augusto announced that the bank has accepted the earned amount of money that wasn't initially enough to pay the debt, so Cielo Grande is finally saved. Steffi decides to stay at the hotel, wanting to spend more time with Luz and get to know Cynthia more; she also blocks Natasha from all of her accounts as to not hear from her for a while. Noda quits his job as the hotel's clerk to travel the world with Matrix alongside the twins. Naty can't find the courage to tell Luz that she is in love with her, instead telling her that she has found a vocation in writing. Ron and Ian say their goodbyes to Steffi and the others before they depart for Mexico. As Natasha is about to board a flight for Milan, she sees the backlash she is receiving on social media over her unfair means to win the competition. Feeling defeated by this, Natasha takes matters into her own hands and contacts someone named Oliver, telling him that they have to discuss Cielo Grande's future.

=== Season 2 (2022) ===
No. overall	No. in season	Title	Directed by	Written by	Original release date
12	1	"New Management"	Mauro Scandolari	Jorge Edelstein & Celeste Lamber	30 December 2022
Natasha and her brother Oliver announce that they have purchased the hotel and start implementing a lot of controversial changes, to the group's frustration. In addition, Natasha decides to host an all-female wakeboarding competition, the Girls' Jump, in order to determine the real winner. However, despite Tony's insistence, Steffi refuses to compete as she wants to spend more time with her family, knowing that Natasha is still upset over the negative outcome on her victory. Charly also meets and falls in love with Leonor, one of the competitors. Rita, Luz and Steffi's maternal grandmother, comes to visit but thinks that a man nicknamed "Ruli" is her father and is unaware that the two are sisters. As Steffi confronts Natasha when the changes keep piling up, her ex-boyfriend Santi arrives, and is revealed to be Natasha's new coach.
13	2	"The Challenge"	Mauro Scandolari	Jorge Edelstein & Celeste Lamber	30 December 2022
Santi wants Steffi to forgive him and rekindle their relationship, but she refuses his advances and is hurt because he cheated on her with Natasha. Luz starts doubting that Ron is her father after what Rita said to her about Ruli. Julian, Luz and Charly come across an abandoned old stage they could use for their performances after Oliver banned them from Sky Vibes and rebranded it. They are also angered to learn that he plagiarized one of their songs and claimed it as his own. Julian and Steffi's relationship falters because of Steffi's issues with her family and especially Santi's sudden arrival, and can't bring herself to open up to him. Natasha challenges Luz to a wakeboarding duel, but it results in Luz accidentally falling and being made fun of in social media, provoking Steffi into doing the challenge, which she wins. However, Steffi still refuses to compete, and argues with Luz, believing that Tony convinced her to make Steffi compete by force. Tony later apologizes to Steffi for pressuring her and lets her take the coaching sessions at her own pace. However, before she can give an answer by the next day, Leonor passes by and implies that Tony was coaching her, angering Steffi, who ultimately reneges on the offer and reaffirms her decision of not participating at the competition.
14	3	"Role Reversal"	Mauro Scandolari	Jorge Edelstein & Celeste Lamber	30 December 2022
Because of Steffi's recent decision, Natasha's methods with the Girls Jam to prove that she is better than her are criticized on social media, to her disappointment. Oliver sees potential in Wonder, Matrix's twin sister and the Monzo twins' provisional manager, and offers her to write songs for him and help choreograph his group of dancers. Luz informs her grandmother that she and Steffi are sisters, but she is still convinced that Ruli is their father. Nevertheless, she hands her an old cellphone to seek the information she needs. Disheartened by Steffi's distant attitude, Julián suggests that they take a break from each other. Luz asks Tony to be her coach, but he refuses because of how it might affect their relationship, only for her to misinterpret it as a lack of confidence in her skills. After encouragement from Steffi, Luz enrolls in the competition, this time with Steffi as her coach. Tony decides to go back to Mexico, feeling that he has nothing else to do following his arguments with both sisters.
15	4	"Open Sky"	Mauro Scandolari	Jorge Edelstein & Celeste Lamber	30 December 2022
Steffi manages to convince Tony to stay for the sake of his relationship with Luz, who catches him on the act and, despite being angered at this, the two agree to sort out their differences. Steffi and Luz suspect that Julián might be their brother after finding out that Cynthia had history with both Augusto and Julián's father. On the other hand, Julián has second thoughts about what he said to Steffi, but backs down when Steffi covers up her suspicions by telling him that they should stay apart. Luz relays her discoveries to Julián, making him realize why Steffi has been acting strange recently. Juan and Fer have a falling out over Natasha's intentions with Cielo and the latter's blind love for her, but Juan still sides in favor of the Cielos. Charly hosts a show at the recycled theater that is attended by most of the guests. Luz manages to unlock her mother's old cellphone and contacts Ruli, who is revealed to be Augusto as he answers the call. Santi takes Steffi to the woods where they kiss and are seen by Natasha.
16	5	"Leaving!"	Mauro Scandolari	Jorge Edelstein & Celeste Lamber	30 December 2022
Natasha skips the training sessions to avoid Steffi and Santi. Julián begs Steffi to take him back, but she's not ready to end their break as she's confused about her feelings for both boys. Steffi and Luz have a disastrous training session because of their closeness to each other. Tony interferes in their conflict and suggests getting another coach for Luz as mixing the training with their relation would do more harm than good. Natasha manipulates Julián into believing that Steffi is not a good person by faking the entire story about their respective feelings for Santi, and tells him that she and Santi kissed the night of the show. When Julián confronts Steffi, she admits to it and apologizes, but he still breaks up with her. Oliver and Natasha have the recycled theater dismantled and order that all trees of Cielo Grande be cut down to expand the hotel, as a consequence affecting the zone's ecosystem. The group makes a protest to prevent this and block the lumberjacks from passing. Natasha, Oliver and Santi witness this.
17	6	"All or Nothing"	Mauro Scandolari	Jorge Edelstein & Celeste Lamber	30 December 2022
Natasha and Oliver's efforts to stop the protest are futile as Steffi and co keep on chanting against the tree felling. In response, she threatens to have the lumberjack boat run them over. However, they are interrupted and arrested by the prefecture, temporarily halting the siblings' plan. Fer defects from Natasha's team and rejoins the Cielo Grande gang. Most of the female wakeboarders drop out of the competition over Natasha's indifference on the environment, including Oliver's dancers. Charly and Leonor kiss. Oliver faces a financial loss after most of the guests leave the resort, but Wonder manages to bring his spirit back with words of encouragement. Cynthia and Rita talk about the past. It turns out that Cynthia and Augusto were brielfy in a relationship before they broke up. Rita was also as dubious as Steffi and Luz were about who their father was, leading Cynthia to clarify previous misunderstandings and advises the girls to ask her or Ron the next time they have more doubts. Natasha makes a deal with Steffi; if Steffi wins the Girls' Jam, Natasha and Oliver will sell the hotel to her father, but if she loses, the expansion and tree felling will continue as planned.
18	7	"Girls Jam!"	Mauro Scandolari	Jorge Edelstein & Celeste Lamber	30 December 2022
With the fate of Cielo now laying on Steffi's hands, she starts training for the Girls Jump. Luz and Leonor also practice with Julián and Charly as their respective coaches. Steffi and Natasha separately reminisce about their former friendship and the toll it took on them because of Santi. Tony tries to convince Steffi to do the air trick to beat Natasha, but she thinks it's very risky, especially given that she missed several days of training. The competition begins and all the competitors do their passes. Leonor scores 89 points while Luz scores 92 points. However, when Steffi goes next, she is unable to get her head in the competition, resulting in her giving a poor performance while failing to do the air trick at the same time. Steffi gets the lowest score of 77 points, and Natasha manages to surpass her with 94 points. Since only the top five members get to enter the finals, Steffi is pushed down the sixth position and eliminated from the competition. Natasha gloats about her victory while Steffi and her friends are saddened.
19	8	"Now or Never"	Mauro Scandolari	Jorge Edelstein & Celeste Lamber	30 December 2022
Steffi beats herself up for losing Cielo Grande because of how she treated Natasha, but her friends comfort her. When it seems that all hope is lost, Charly comes up with an idea: according to the rules, the disqualified wakeboarder with the highest score will be allowed back to the competition if at least one of the current chooses to withdraw. Luz renounces and Steffi is given another chance to win and take Cielo back, much to Natasha's anger. Steffi and Natasha do their first passes, but Natasha scores 95 points behind Steffi, who gets 91 points. Before doing her second pass, Steffi approaches Natasha, apologizing for everything that happened between them and forgives her. Steffi finally manages to do the air trick and scores 97 points, defeating Natasha with 94 points. Natasha and Oliver make good on their deal and agree to let Steffi keep Cielo. Natasha and Steffi promise not to fight over a boy ever again and mend their friendship while breaking off their affiliation with Santi. Steffi and Luz become coowners of the hotel alongside Augusto. Wonder joins Oliver as his permanent manager. Steffi and Julian get back together. At the airport, Natasha, Oliver and Wonder watch a video of the sports announcer asking the viewers to choose between Luz or Steffi as the best wakeboarder. However, Natasha tells Oliver to let them figure that out before heading to the terminal. The episode ends with Wonder smiling excitedly at the camera and putting her thumb up.
