= List of Bia episodes =

Bia is an Argentine telenovela produced by Pegsa y Non Stop for Disney Channel Latin America in collaboration with Disney Channel Europe, Middle East & Africa. The series premiered on 24 June 2019. The first season ended on 8 November 2019, with a total of 60 episodes.

In October 2019, the series was renewed for a second season which aired from 16 March 2020, and ended on 24 July 2020, once again consisting of 60 episodes.

During the course of the series, 120 episodes of Bia have aired over two seasons.

== Series overview ==
Series	Episodes		Originally released	
Series	Episodes		First released	Last released
1	60	20	24 June 2019	19 July 2019
1	60	20	19 August 2019	13 September 2019
1	60	20	14 October 2019	8 November 2019
2	60		16 March 2020	24 July 2020
Especial			19 February 2021	

== Episodes ==
=== Season 1 (2019) ===
No. overall	No. in season	Title	Original release date
Part 1
1	1	Episode 1	24 June 2019
2	2	Episode 2	25 June 2019
3	3	Episode 3	26 June 2019
4	4	Episode 4	27 June 2019
5	5	Episode 5	28 June 2019
6	6	Episode 6	1 July 2019
7	7	Episode 7	2 July 2019
8	8	Episode 8	3 July 2019
9	9	Episode 9	4 July 2019
10	10	Episode 10	5 July 2019
11	11	Episode 11	8 July 2019
12	12	Episode 12	9 July 2019
13	13	Episode 13	10 July 2019
14	14	Episode 14	11 July 2019
15	15	Episode 15	12 July 2019
16	16	Episode 16	15 July 2019
17	17	Episode 17	16 July 2019
18	18	Episode 18	17 July 2019
19	19	Episode 19	18 July 2019
20	20	Episode 20	19 July 2019
Part 2
21	21	Episode 21	19 August 2019
22	22	Episode 22	20 August 2019
23	23	Episode 23	21 August 2019
24	24	Episode 24	22 August 2019
25	25	Episode 25	23 August 2019
26	26	Episode 26	26 August 2019
27	27	Episode 27	27 August 2019
28	28	Episode 28	28 August 2019
29	29	Episode 29	29 August 2019
30	30	Episode 30	30 August 2019
31	31	Episode 31	2 September 2019
32	32	Episode 32	3 September 2019
33	33	Episode 33	4 September 2019
34	34	Episode 34	5 September 2019
35	35	Episode 35	6 September 2019
36	36	Episode 36	9 September 2019
37	37	Episode 37	10 September 2019
38	38	Episode 38	11 September 2019
39	39	Episode 39	12 September 2019
40	40	Episode 40	13 September 2019
Part 3
41	41	Episode 41	14 October 2019
42	42	Episode 42	15 October 2019
43	43	Episode 43	16 October 2019
44	44	Episode 44	17 October 2019
45	45	Episode 45	18 October 2019
46	46	Episode 46	21 October 2019
47	47	Episode 47	22 October 2019
48	48	Episode 48	23 October 2019
49	49	Episode 49	24 October 2019
50	50	Episode 50	25 October 2019
51	51	Episode 51	28 October 2019
52	52	Episode 52	29 October 2019
53	53	Episode 53	30 October 2019
54	54	Episode 54	31 October 2019
55	55	Episode 55	1 November 2019
56	56	Episode 56	4 November 2019
57	57	Episode 57	5 November 2019
58	58	Episode 58	6 November 2019
59	59	Episode 59	7 November 2019
60	60	Episode 60	8 November 2019

=== Season 2 (2020) ===
No. overall	No. in season	Title	Original release date
61	1	Episode 1	16 March 2020
62	2	Episode 2	17 March 2020
63	3	Episode 3	18 March 2020
64	4	Episode 4	19 March 2020
65	5	Episode 5	20 March 2020
66	6	Episode 6	23 March 2020
67	7	Episode 7	24 March 2020
68	8	Episode 8	25 March 2020
69	9	Episode 9	26 March 2020
70	10	Episode 10	27 March 2020
71	11	Episode 11	30 March 2020
72	12	Episode 12	31 March 2020
73	13	Episode 13	1 April 2020
74	14	Episode 14	2 April 2020
75	15	Episode 15	3 April 2020
76	16	Episode 16	6 April 2020
77	17	Episode 17	7 April 2020
78	18	Episode 18	8 April 2020
79	19	Episode 19	9 April 2020
80	20	Episode 20	10 April 2020
81	21	Episode 21	13 April 2020
82	22	Episode 22	14 April 2020
83	23	Episode 23	15 April 2020
84	24	Episode 24	16 April 2020
85	25	Episode 25	17 April 2020
86	26	Episode 26	20 April 2020
87	27	Episode 27	21 April 2020
88	28	Episode 28	22 April 2020
89	29	Episode 29	23 April 2020
90	30	Episode 30	24 April 2020
91	31	Episode 31	27 April 2020
92	32	Episode 32	28 April 2020
93	33	Episode 33	29 April 2020
94	34	Episode 34	30 April 2020
95	35	Episode 35	1 May 2020
96	36	Episode 36	4 May 2020
97	37	Episode 37	5 May 2020
98	38	Episode 38	6 May 2020
99	39	Episode 39	7 May 2020
100	40	Episode 40	8 May 2020
101	41	Episode 41	29 June 2020 (Note: After episode 40, Disney did not confirm whether the season would be divided into parts. However, through the official Instagram they confirmed new episodes from 29 June 2020.) (Note: This episode was originally scheduled to air on 6 July 2020. However, Disney pushed the date back after the episode started airing in Spain on 22 June 2020.)
102	42	Episode 42	30 June 2020
103	43	Episode 43	1 July 2020
104	44	Episode 44	2 July 2020
105	45	Episode 45	3 July 2020
106	46	Episode 46	6 July 2020
107	47	Episode 47	7 July 2020
108	48	Episode 48	8 July 2020
109	49	Episode 49	9 July 2020
110	50	Episode 50	10 July 2020
111	51	Episode 51	13 July 2020
112	52	Episode 52	14 July 2020
113	53	Episode 53	15 July 2020
114	54	Episode 54	16 July 2020
115	55	Episode 55	17 July 2020
116	56	Episode 56	20 July 2020
117	57	Episode 57	21 July 2020
118	58	Episode 58	22 July 2020
119	59	Episode 59	23 July 2020
120	60	Episode 60	24 July 2020
