= Disney 11 =

Argentine television series

- Genre: Telenovela
- Created by: Jorge Edelstein
- Screenplay by: Javier Castro Albano; Marcos Osorio Vidal; Tom Wortley; Fernando Riveros
- Directed by: Sebastián Pivotto Nicolas Di Cocco
- Opening theme: I Love It Loud
- Country of origin: Argentina
- Original language: Spanish
- No. of seasons: 3
- No. of episodes: 220

Production
- Executive producer: Cecília Mendonça Javier Castany
- Producer: Adrián Suar
- Running time: 22-30 minutes
- Production companies: Pol-Ka Producciones; Pegsa Group

Original release
- Network: Disney XD
- Release: 13 March 2017 – 29 November 2019

Disney 11 (Spanish: Once, Latin American Spanish: [ˈonse], lit. 'Eleven', stylized as O11CE) is an Argentine youth sports telenovela produced by Pol-ka Producciones in association with Disney XD Latin America, the American Disney Channel and The Walt Disney Company, starring Mariano González-Guerineau and Sebastián Athie.

The first season had 80 episodes divided into two parts of 40 chapters each, like the second season, the third season had 60 episodes divided into three parts of 20 episodes each.

It premiered in Latin America on 13 March 2017, on the same channel and also through the high definition signal of the Disney Channel. On 11 September of the same year, Brandon Zúñiga Vega premiered on Disney Channel's standard resolution signals.

On 11 April 2017, The Walt Disney Company confirmed that the series was being renewed for a second season, which premiered in Latin America on 30 April 2018. On 15 July 2019, the third season premiered, with the final episode broadcast 29 November 2019.

== Cast ==
- Mariano González-Guerineau as Gabriel 'Gabo' Moreti
- Sebastián Athié as Lorenzo Guevara
- Juan David Penagos as Ricardo 'Ricky' Flores
- Luan Brum Lima as André 'Dedé' Duarte
- Paulina Vetrano as Zoe Velázquez
- Javier Eloy Bonanno as Joaquín Costa
- Renato Quattordio as Apolodoros '14' Nikotatópulos (seasons 1-2; guest season 3)
- Agustina Palma as Martina Markinson (seasons 1–2)
- Fausto Bengoechea as Adrián Roca (seasons 1–2)
- Tomás Blanco as Valentino Toledo (seasons 1–2)
- Lucas Minuzzi as Pablo Espiga
- Paulo Sánchez Lima as Mariano Galo (seasons 1–2)
- Federico J. Gurruchaga as Lucas Quintana (seasons 1-2; guest season 3)
- Juan Francisco Cabrera as Daniel Gratzia
- Juan Baustista Herrera as Leonardo 'Leo' Palacios (seasons 1 and 3; guest season 2)
- Santiago Luna as Rafael "Rafa" Fierro (season 1-3)
- Juan de Dios Ortíz as Diego Guevara (seasons 1-2; guest season 3)
- Verónica Pelaccini as Isabel Di Marco (seasons 1-2; guest season 3)
- Santiago Stieben as Vitto Voltagio
- Nicolás Pauls as Francisco Velázquez
- Pablo Gershanik as Amadeo Carillo
- Guido Pennelli as Ezequiel Correa (seasons 2-3; recurring season 1)
- Daniel Patiño as Martin Mejía (season 2; recurring season 3)
- Candelaria Grau as Celeste Brizuela (seasons 2-3; recurring season 1)
- Joaquín Ochoa as Arturo Garrido (season 3)
- Julia Tozzi as Natalia Acosta (season 3)
- Paula Cancio as Laura Domenek (season 3)
- Bianca Zero as Delfina Soto (season 3)
- Julián Cerati as Felipe Aragón
- Beatriz Dellacasa as Amelia Moreti
- Alfredo Castellani as Florensio/Franco Peloci (season 1; recurring season 2; guest season 3)
- Giampaolo Samà as Giovanni Malafacce (seasons 1-2)
- Mariano Zabalza as Camilo Montero (seasons 1-2)
- Julia Dovganishina as Anna 'Anya' Safonova
- Luca Marconetti as Hans Newman
- Antonella Felici as Marcela
- Camila Sassi as Micaela
- Sandra Criolani as Grizelda
- Elis García as Abril Alcaraz
- Juan Ciancio as Franco Quesada
- Constanza Espejo as Martina's mother
- Alfredo Allende as Olson
- Muni Seligmann as Alejandra "Alex" Feuder
- Gaby de Castillo as Ulises Zabaleta
- Agostina Fabrizio as Silvia
- María Jesús Rinteria as Fernanda
- Juanma Muniagurria as Federico (season 3)

== Series overview ==
Series	Episodes		Originally released		UK First aired	UK Last aired
Series	Episodes		First released	Last released	UK First aired	UK Last aired
1	80	40	13 March 2017	5 May 2017	4 June 2018	27 July 2018
1	80	40	3 July 2017	25 August 2017	30 July 2018	21 September 2018
2	80	40	30 April 2018	22 June 2018	24 September 2018	16 November 2018
2	80	40	20 August 2018	12 October 2018	14 January 2019	8 March 2019
3	60	20	15 July 2019	9 August 2019	4 November 2019	29 November 2019
3	60	20	9 September 2019	4 October 2019	13 January 2020	7 February 2020
3	60	20	4 November 2019	29 November 2019	18 May 2020	12 June 2020

=== Season 1 (2017) ===
Gabriel "Gabo" Moreti (Mariano González-Guerineau), is a teenager who lives with his grandmother Amelia (Beatriz Dellacasa) in a small town in Argentina called Álamo Seco. Gabo's great passion is soccer. His great soccer aptitude does not go unnoticed by Francisco Velázquez (Nicolas Pauls), technical director of the soccer team of the prestigious Sports Academic Institute (IAD), who decides to grant him a scholarship as number 10. Gabo begins with a trip to Buenos Aires to live in the IAD. His dream is to become a great player, but what he does not know is that on this journey, destiny will also make him discover the secrets of his family history. The IAD (Sports Academic Institute) is a demanding educational center whose objective is to enhance the best skills of each student, both academic and sports. The institute has a high level of technological-sports research and thanks to this it can carry out sophisticated studies that support the sports careers of all its students. Home to Los Halcones Dorados, the best student soccer team, the IAD has suffered an unexpected setback: most of the team members have left the institution to attend other schools or join the lower divisions of professional teams. Gabo is the key to rebuilding the team but that does not fall in favor of Lorenzo Guevara (Sebastián Athie) (Player number 9) who is the star striker and the only one of the original players who remains at the Institute. Although Gabo will have to face numerous challenges at the IAD, he will not do it alone, since he has the support of his friends Ricardo "Ricky" Flores (Juan David Penagos) (Player number 7) and Andrés "Dedé" Duarte (Luan Brum) ( Player number 6), Zoe Velázquez (Paulina Vetrano) is Francisco's daughter and is Gabo's friend, Joaquín Costa (Javier Eloy Bonnano) is not a player but is a sports reporter or journalist. Throughout history, Gabo will acquire the necessary. Also, Gabo is Loved by Anna

=== Season 2 (2018) ===
All the hawks are happy and believe that what follows is a calmer time because they have already finished the Intercup and emerged champions, but an even more important challenge awaits them: they will play the Continental tournament, a championship in which only the teams that obtained the first and second place in the Intercopa of each region of Latin America. On the other hand, the fifth-year students of the IAD have their heads focused not only on the championship, but also on diagramming their career plan: it is their last year as students and each one will have to discover what they want to do with their life. In this sense, it will be essential for them to understand that training a footballer not only involves training in sport, but also intellectually. As for Gabo, fate does not stop pulling its strings so that he can finally discover who his father is. It is the most complex crossroads of life that one will have to go through. If until now one has had to adapt to a new world, one will have to test the values, convictions, and beliefs with which one was formed. At the same time, a Colombian student, Martín (Playdo number 19), arrives on an exchange to join the Falcons as reinforcement. He is a skilled number 8 that not only has a very particular personality marked by a certain tendency to obsession enhanced by an intelligence that far exceeds the average, but also hides a very dark side. Gabo will have to face Martín to keep his position at Los Halcones.

=== Season 3 (2019) ===
Gabo's dream is close to being realized, but now he is caught in a conflict between his love for Álamo Seco, his consolidation as a professional player, and the Golden Falcons being in the World Cup because they have already won the continental tournament. If one wants to reach the top of football, one will have to overcome these last obstacles that are between one's past and one's future.

=== Season 4 (2026) ===
Gabo and his friends have all gone their separate ways after Lorenzo's death, until they all receive a package containing their forgotten football shirt. (release date November 15)

== Production ==
The telenovela began production on 29 May 2016. Jorge Edelstein is the same creator who made the telenovelas Soy Luna and Bia. With the script by Javier Castro Albano, Marcos Osorio Vidal, Tom Wortley and Fernando Rivero in season 3, the direction; Sebastián Pivotto in season 1, by Nicolás Di Cocco: in seasons 2 and 3.

It is an original Pol-Ka Producciones production made in collaboration with Disney XD Latin America. The production is in charge of Pegsa, with the collaboration of Non Stop and its premiere was on 13 March 2017 throughout Latin America.

== Music ==
Year	Song	Album
2017	"From the Stadium to the Sky (Morat Guests)"	From the Stadium to the Sky
2018	"Play With Your Heart" (Sebastián Athié, Paulina Vetrano and Daniel Patiño)	Play With Your Heart
2018	"Play With Your Heart" (Remix) (Sebastián Athié, Paulina Vetrano and Daniel Patiño ft. Julia Dovganishina)	Play With Your Heart
2018	"Catch Me If You Can" (Paulina Vetrano, Agustina Palma, Luan Brum and Sebastián Athié)	Catch Me If You Can
