= A Caverna Encantada =

- Genre: Children's telenovela; Adventure; Fantasy
- Created by: Íris Abravanel
- Based on: A Little Princess and The Secret Garden by Frances Hodgson Burnett
- Written by: Andreza Porto; Denise Barbosa; Fany Higuera; Gustavo Braga; Luiz Felipe Pereira Santos
- Directed by: Rica Mantoanelli
- Starring: List: Mel Summers; Isabela Souza; Miguel Coelho; Wallentina Bomfim; Bernardo Schroeder; Rosi Campos; Andrey Lopes; Arthur Kohl; Luiza Tomé; Giulia Nassa; Sofia Fornazari; Phil Miler; Andrey Lopes; Diego Laumar; (See more)
- Opening theme: "A Caverna Encantada (Jesus bleibet meine Freude)", by Ana Castela
- Ending theme: "A Caverna Encantada (Jesus bleibet meine Freude)", Instrumental
- Composer: Salomon Franck
- Country of origin: Brazil
- Original language: Portuguese
- No. of seasons: 4
- No. of episodes: 287

Production
- Executive producer: Lívia Vital
- Producer: Fernanda Marques; Gabriel Gordinho; Gabriele Costa de Piedade; Larissa Monteiro; Bruna Rafaela; Nicolas Vital; Nathália Lima; Rodnei dos Santos Marques; Thiago Pinheiro; Vinícius Daneluz
- Production locations: CDT da Anhanguera, Osasco, São Paulo; Januária, Minas Gerais; Itacarambi, Minas Gerais
- Editor: Andréia Bernardo; Aquiléia Nobre; Clayton Vianna; Hermenegildo R. Junior; Renata Miranda
- Camera setup: Multi-camera
- Running time: 45 minutes
- Production companies: SBT; The Walt Disney Company

Original release
- Network: SBT; Disney+
- Release: 29 July 2024 – 5 September 2025

A Caverna Encantada is a Brazilian children's telenovela created by Íris Abravanel, produced and broadcast by SBT in partnership with Disney+ on July 29, 2024 and ended on September 5, 2025. It is an adaptation of the books A Little Princess and The Secret Garden, written by Frances Hodgson Burnett.

== Plot ==
The plot tells the story of Anna, a 7-year-old girl, daughter of doctor and missionary Paulo. Her father receives a call for a dangerous mission and, unfortunately, Anna will not be able to accompany him. Paulo leaves his daughter Anna at a boarding school in the interior of São Paulo, where the girl will live with very different children. The father promises to return on his daughter's birthday, but mysteriously, he does not return. Anna decides to investigate the reasons behind her father's disappearance and ends up discovering some interesting things about her past.

== Cast ==
Actor	Character
Mel Summers	Anna Salvatore
Isabela Souza	Pilar
Miguel Coelho	Gabriel
Juju Penido	Lavínia Elizabeth Albuquerque
Gabriel Avellar	Felipe Ribeiro (Pê de Peste)
Theo Radicchi	Rui
Wallentina Bomfim	Manuela Bellini (Manu)
Clarice Niskier	Diretora Norma Alencar
Pamella Machado	Elisa
Rosi Campos	Shirley Ramos
Magali Biff	Wanda Ramos
Phil Miler	Goma Berh
Luíza Tomé	Dalete Alves
Andrey Lopes	César
Thay Bergamim	Betina
Giulia Nassa	Cristina
Bernardo Schroeder	Lucas
Sofia Fornazari	Flora
Manu Bistene	Isadora Ramos
Milena Ramos	Maria Eduarda
Juju Teófilo	Nina
Mari Yumi	Jane Martins
Diego Laumar	Moisés Alves
Lucca Almeida	Pedro Cabral
Bernardo Prado	Benjamin Cabral
Arthur Kohl	Juscelino
Ariane Souza	Fátima
Henrique Sganzerla	Thomas
Victor Lima	Rubens (Binho)
Gui Tavares	André Ávelar
Théo Werneck	Tonico

Puppet

Actor	Character
Fernando Gomes	Moleza, the sloth backpack
Neusa de Souza	Safira, the snake
André Milano	Dôdo, the bat

Special appearances

Actor	Character
Elam Lima	Paulo Salvatore (Dr. Paulo)
André Ramiro	Matheus
Débora Duarte	Dona Clélia
Tuna Dwek	Patrícia Mascarenhas
Arthur Kohl	Professor Juscelino
Polly Marinho	Sossô Perigosa
Lis Luciddi	Telma Gaspar
Ana Castela	Ana Flávia Alves
Moacyr Franco	Laércio
Thaís Pacholek	Talita
Belutti	Beto
Fausto Carvalho	Jorginho
Ivan Cápua	Marquês de Isconhecido
Nilton Bicudo	Chicleto de Souza Grudento
Márcia Dantas	Herself
Gaby Cabrini	Herself

== Production ==
In September 2023, it was reported that SBT intended to readapt the work Meu Pé de Laranja Lima, which would be the fourth version of the aforementioned book. In addition to the Brazilian text, another work that had entered the broadcaster's radar was the Argentine soap opera Patito feo, which would gain a remake in 2020 to replace As Aventuras de Poliana, but was suspended due to the broadcaster's budget cuts, which were not going through a good financial moment when it began production in the second half of 2019, with the situation being aggravated by the COVID-19 pandemic the following year. The plot also had similarities to the aforementioned title and was poorly regarded internally due to the scandal caused by actor Juan Darthés, who was arrested for sexual abuse in 2019 after complaints from former castmates.

However, the channel ended up internally discarding the remake of Meu Pé de Laranja Lima and then studied creating a remake of El diario de Daniela, a Mexican soap opera shown in the years 2000 and 2007. The plot was even confirmed by journalist Leão Lobo on December 23, 2023. However, SBT decided to readapt the book The Secret Garden.

In addition to the title of the book itself, the following provisional names were used: Pequenos Gigantes, Enfrentando Gigantes, Anna e os Gigantes e Anna e os Pequenos Gigantes. On March 11, 2024, SBT made the title A Caverna Encantada official.

The first teaser aired on May 26 during the commercial break of Domingo Legal.

=== Casting ===
The first names announced for the soap opera were Carla Diaz, Joaquim Lopes and Regina Duarte. However, only the first two auditioned for the work, while the third had her hiring discarded by the broadcaster, despite the same having made some attempts through invitations, but without success.

Carla Diaz competed for the role of the adult protagonist alongside Anajú Dorigon, but the main role ended up going to Isabela Souza, who was confirmed in the cast along with Miguel Coelho.

To play the child protagonist, SBT bet on newcomer Mel Summers. The general cast was officialized on March 11, 2024, which also confirmed veterans Rosi Campos and Luíza Tomé, marking Rosi's return to the broadcaster after 34 years of her role in Brasileiras e Brasileiros, while Tomé made her debut on the channel. Other veterans confirmed in the plot were Clarice Niskier, whose last work in soap operas was in Carinha de Anjo, Phil Miler, who had been absent from the genre since Os Ricos Também Choram, Arthur Kohl who returned to SBT after having participated in the special Mansão Bem Assombrada and Magali Biff who returned to the channel after having made special appearances in Patrulha Salvadora and A Garota da Moto.

In addition to Mel Summers and a good part of the children's cast, the singers Giulia Nassa and Théo Werneck also made their debut in soap operas, after both had experience in such productions, acting in series and television programs.

=== Filming ===
Filming began on April 1, 2024. Some external scenes were filmed at the Cavernas do Peruaçu National Park in the city of Januária, in Minas Gerais. In addition, the São Francisco River and the city of Itacarambi also served as a setting for the plot.

== Broadcast ==
Series overview
Season	Episodes	Originally released	
Season	Episodes	First released	Last released
1 (Autumn)	80	July 29, 2024	November 15, 2024
2 (Winter)	77	November 18, 2024	March 5, 2025
3 (Spring)	111	March 6, 2025	August 11, 2025
4 (Summer)	19	August 12, 2025	September 5, 2025

The soap opera inaugurates a new format in SBT's plots, being based on television series, already explored previously in the second adaptation of Chiquititas, but being divided into four seasons with 55 chapters, representing a season of the year in each phase of mourning of the protagonist Anna. The difference is that there are no breaks during the broadcast of the plot. Contrary to the initial prediction, the first season ended after 80 chapters. At the beginning of episode 80 (November 15, 2024) the character Moleza informs that winter has arrived at the school and changes are presented in the opening; however, officially, SBT announced that the new season began in chapter 81, on November 18, 2024.

The plot is also being made available on Disney+, but adopting a different strategy from its predecessor when it was available on Prime Video, posting the chapter right after it is broadcast on TV.

Between August 5 and 7, 2024, the soap opera had its chapters rerun from the previous week in the 18:30 (BR) pm to 19:45 (BR) pm time slot, but only shown in some locations that do not show local programming. However, due to low ratings, the rerun was taken off the air on the 8th, being replaced by Tá na Hora after it returned to occupy the time slot.

== Music ==
=== A Caverna Encantada ===
A Caverna Encantada

Soundtrack album by Various artists
- Released: July 23, 2024
- Genre: Children's music
- Length: 29:51
- Language: Portuguese
- Label: SBT Music
- Producer: Lua Nova

Various artists chronology
A Caverna Encantada	A Caverna Encantada, Vol. 2

The soundtrack album was released on July 23, 2024 by SBT Music on digital platforms, containing 14 songs performed by the cast. The telenovela's opening theme is a reinterpretation of the chorale "Jesus bleibet meine Freude", by the German composer Johann Sebastian Bach in 1723, it was adapted by the Brazilian version composed by Fernando Forni and Thomas Roth and performed by the singer Ana Castela, and had an extended version at the end of the album.

Track listing

No.	Title	Writer(s)	Artist(s)	Length
1.	"A Caverna Encantada (Jesus bleibet meine Freude)"	Fernando Forni; Johann Sebastian Bach; Thomas Roth	Ana Castela	01:03
2.	"Anna"	Gaby Roth; Thomas Roth	Mel Summers	02:50
3.	"Lavínia"	Thomas Roth	Maurício Manieri	02:50
4.	"Colégio Interno Rosa dos Ventos"	Fred Benuce; Johann Strauss II; Thomas Roth	Bianca Lua; Brenda Mayer; Fred Benuce; Isa Salles; Thomas Roth	01:55
5.	"Gotas na Caverna"	Teco Fuchs; Thomas Roth	Tatiana Parra	02:26
6.	"P de Peste"	Fred Benuce; Thomas Roth	Supla	02:05
7.	"Anna e suas Amigas"	Paulo Vaz; Thomas Roth	Bianca Lua; Brenda Mayer	02:12
8.	"Norma"	Carol Navarro; Fred Benuce; Gaby Roth; Isa Salles; Léo Lamos; Loro Roth Thomas Roth	Fred Benuce; Gaby Roth; Ludwing van Beethoven	02:07
9.	"Amar É Maré"	Thomas Roth	Isabela Souza; Miguel Coelho	03:12
10.	"Lolipopus"	Josias Damasceno; Thomas Roth	Phil Miler	02:05
11.	"Moleza Agitado"	Fred Benuce; Gaby Roth	Fernando Gomes	01:50
12.	"Shirley e Wanda"	Teco Fuchs; Thomas Roth	Teco Fuchs	02:22
13.	"Pet Shop Bolhas e Bolhas"	Paulo Vaz; Thomas Roth	Giulia Nassa; Thay Bergamim	02:00
14.	"A Caverna Encantada (Jesus bleibet meine Freude)" (Extended)	Fernando Forni; Johann Sebastian Bach; Thomas Roth	Ana Castela	01:52
Total length:				29:51

=== A Caverna Encantada, Vol. 2 ===
A Caverna Encantada, Vol. 2

Soundtrack album by Various artists
- Released: October 12, 2024
- Genre: Children's music
- Length: 35:17
- Language: Portuguese
- Label: SBT Music
- Producer: Lua Nova

Various artists chronology
A Caverna Encantada	A Caverna Encantada, Vol. 2

On October 4, 2024, SBT Music announced that the album A Caverna Encantada, Vol. 2 would be released as a pre-save that would allow the album to be saved in streaming libraries, until it was officially released on October 12, bringing 15 songs performed by the cast and artists.

Track listing

No.	Title	Writer(s)	Artist(s)	Length
1.	"Januária"	Thomas Roth	Fernando Forni	02:17
2.	"Fafá"	Josias Damasceno; Thomas Roth	Josias Damasceno; Brenda Mayer; Bianca Lua	02:11
3.	"Carvard Me Aguarde"	Lucas Zacarias Frezza; Thomas Roth	Juju Penido	02:08
4.	"Pipipipilar"	Thomas Roth	Andrey Lopes	01:52
5.	"Às Profissões"	Thomas Roth	Brenda Mayer; Isa Salles	02:08
6.	"Elisa"	Thomas Roth	Lupa Mabuze	02:29
7.	"Mais Forte que Aço"	Federico Rossin Benuce; Gabriela Roth Benuce	Tiê	02:38
8.	"Meu Coração"	Gabriela Roth Benuce; Thomas Roth	Reolamos	02:54
9.	"Tônico"	Thomas Roth	Theo Werneck	03:03
10.	"O Que Vem Pode Ser Melhor"	Fernando Piccinini Junior; Thomas Roth	Adriana Drê	02:08
11.	"Gudelícia"	Gabriela Roth Benuce; Thomas Roth	Carol Navarro	02:10
12.	"O Monstro do Lago"	Thomas Roth	Fred Benuce	02:16
13.	"Dalete"	Thomas Roth	Tati Brito	02:26
14.	"Cão e Gato"	Thomas Roth	Giulia Nassa; Thay Bergamim	01:59
15.	"Você Faz Meu Coração Iluminar"	Gabriela Roth Benuce; Thomas Ruth	Mel Summers; Isabela Souza	02:38
Total length:				35:17
