= The Captive (2025 film) =

- Theatrical release poster
- Spanish: El cautivo
- Directed by: Alejandro Amenábar
- Screenplay by: Alejandro Amenábar
- Story by: Alejandro Amenábar; Alejandro Hernández
- Produced by: Fernando Bovaira; Alejandro Amenábar
- Starring: Julio Peña Fernández; Alessandro Borghi; Miguel Rellán; Fernando Tejero; Luis Callejo; José Manuel Poga; Roberto Álamo; Albert Salazar; Juanma Muniagurria; César Sarachu; Jorge Asín; Mohamed Said; Walid Charaf; Luna Berroa; Khaled Kouka
- Cinematography: Álex Catalán
- Edited by: Carolina Martínez Urbina
- Music by: Alejandro Amenábar
- Production companies: MOD Producciones; Himenóptero; Misent Producciones; MOD Pictures; Propaganda Italia
- Distributed by: Buena Vista International (es)
- Release dates: 7 September 2025 (TIFF); 12 September 2025 (Spain)
- Running time: 133 minutes
- Countries: Spain; Italy
- Languages: Spanish; Arabic; Italian

The Captive (Spanish: El cautivo) is a 2025 adventure drama film directed by Alejandro Amenábar. It stars Julio Peña as Miguel de Cervantes, and explores Cervantes' five-year spell in captivity in Algiers navigating a relationship with Hasán Bajá, played by Alessandro Borghi. It is a Spanish-Italian co-production.

The film premiered at the 2025 Toronto International Film Festival on 7 September, followed by its theatrical release in Spain by Buena Vista International on 12 September 2025. It won Best Makeup and Hairstyles at the 40th Goya Awards.

== Plot ==
The plot explores the plight of wounded navy soldier Miguel de Cervantes after being taken captive to Algiers in 1575, involving his attempts to escape, the development of his skills for storytelling, and a romance with the governor of Algiers. (Note: The plot echoes the accusations launched against Cervantes by Blanco de Paz, a Dominican friar in captivity in Algiers, of "dealings and familiarity" with the Turk and of "vicious, ugly, and dishonest things", which according to Amenábar, could only refer to homosexuality.)

== Cast ==
- Julio Peña as Miguel de Cervantes
- Alessandro Borghi as Hasán Bajá
- Miguel Rellán as Antonio de Sosa
- Fernando Tejero as Blanco de Paz
- José Manuel Poga as Diego Castañeda
- Luis Callejo as Dorador
- Roberto Álamo as Abderramán
- Albert Salazar as Beltrán
- César Sarachu as Fray Juan Gil
- Jorge Asín as Antón
- Luna Berroa as Zoraida

== Production ==
The Captive is a Spanish-Italian co-production by MOD Producciones, Himenóptero, Misent Producciones and Propaganda Italia and it had the participation of Netflix, RTVE, and Rai Cinema and backing from ICAA, Generalitat Valenciana, and Eurimages. It boasted a reported budget of around €14 million. Part of the filming took place in April 2024 at the Castle-Fortress of Santa Pola. Shooting locations also included the Alcázar of Seville (standing in for the Algiers' Pasha Palace), and the Marchenilla Castle in Alcalá de Guadaíra.

== Release ==
The film had its world premiere at the 50th Toronto International Film Festival (TIFF) on 7 September 2025. It was released theatrically in Spain on 12 September 2025 by Buena Vista International. Global Constellation (formerly Film Constellation) managed international sales, selling rights in France (Haut et Court), Greece and Cyprus (Filmtrade/Tanweer), Portugal (NOS Audiovisuais), Bulgaria (Pro Films), and former Yugoslavia (Discovery). It was also included in the 'World Focus' programming of the 38th Tokyo International Film Festival.

== Reception ==
=== Critical reception ===
On the review aggregator website Rotten Tomatoes, 71% of 17 critics' reviews are positive, with an average rating of 6.8/10.

Olivia Popp of Cineuropa observed that Amenábar "imbues the mythos with a sparkling shot of a gay enemies-to-maybe-lovers tale, complete with the production and costumed resplendence of a historical epic". Marta Medina of El Confidencial rated The Captive 2 out of 5 stars, lamenting the historical drama film to be a "wasted chance", as it tackles its central topic in a "prude and insignificant" fashion.

=== Historical depiction ===
Cervantes historian José Manuel Lucía Megías, author of 2025 nonfiction book Cervantes íntimo. Amor y sexo en los Siglos de Oro, acted as a historical consultant for the film. Contrary to the film's depiction, Lucía Megías considers the theory of a Cervantes engaging in homosexuality in Algiers a myth, originated in transgressive revisionism in the 1980s. The relationship between Cervantes and Hassan Pasha, two adult men of almost the same age, would have not been tolerated in the Islamic world at the time and place, where only relationships between an active older man and a passive young man were possible. The film also adapts the plot point that Cervantes was accused in his youth of engaging in homosexual acts with his mentor Juan López de Hoyos, which Lucía Megías described as a notion invented by modern writer Fernando Arrabal. In spite of this, Lucía Megías praised the film highly.

== Accolades ==
Year	Award	Category	Nominee(s)	Result	Ref.
2025	31st Forqué Awards	Audience Award		Won	
2026	13th Feroz Awards	Best Supporting Actor in a Film	Miguel Rellán	Nominated	
2026	13th Feroz Awards	Best Original Soundtrack	Alejandro Amenábar	Nominated	
2026	81st CEC Medals	Best New Actor	Julio Peña	Won	
2026	81st CEC Medals	Best Supporting Actor	Miguel Rellán	Nominated	
2026	81st CEC Medals	Best Cinematography	Álex Catalán	Nominated	
2026	81st CEC Medals	Best Music	Alejandro Amenábar	Nominated	
2026	40th Goya Awards	Best New Actor	Julio Peña	Nominated	
2026	40th Goya Awards	Best Supporting Actor	Miguel Rellán	Nominated	
2026	40th Goya Awards	Best Art Direction	Juan Pedro de Gaspar	Nominated	
2026	40th Goya Awards	Best Production Supervision	Sergio Díaz Bermejo	Nominated	
2026	40th Goya Awards	Best Sound	Aitor Berenguer, Gabriel Gutiérrez, Candela Palencia	Nominated	
2026	40th Goya Awards	Best Makeup and Hairstyles	Ana López-Puigcerver, Belén López-Puigcerver, Nacho Díaz	Won	
2026	40th Goya Awards	Best Costume Design	Nicoletta Taranta	Nominated	
2026	34th Actors and Actresses Union Awards	Best New Actor	Julio Peña	Won	
2026	13th Platino Awards	Best Makeup and Hairstyles	Ana López-Puigcerver, Belén López-Puigcerver, Nacho Díaz	Won	

== See also ==
- List of Spanish films of 2025
