= Hassan Veneziano =

Regent of Algiers

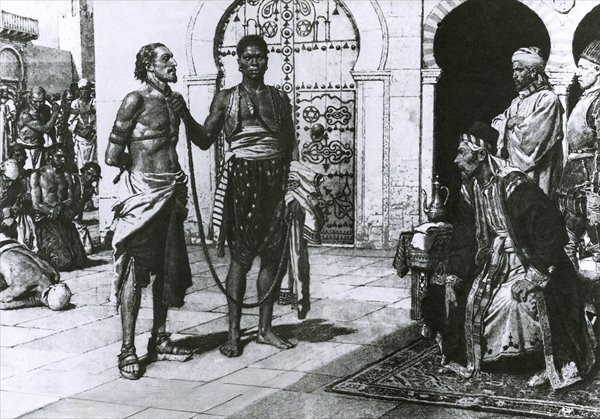
Miguel de Cervantes brought before Hassan Pasha.

Hassan Veneziano (fl. 1587), was regent of Algiers from 1577 to 1580 and from 1582 to 1587. His successor was Djafer Pasha.

A Venetian slave, he served Uludj Ali when he was governor of Algiers and Captain Pasha in Constantinople. He later was appointed by him to head of the Regency of Algiers.

== In popular culture ==
He was portrayed by Alessandro Borghi in the 2025 film The Captive.
