= Go! Live Your Way =

Argentine television series

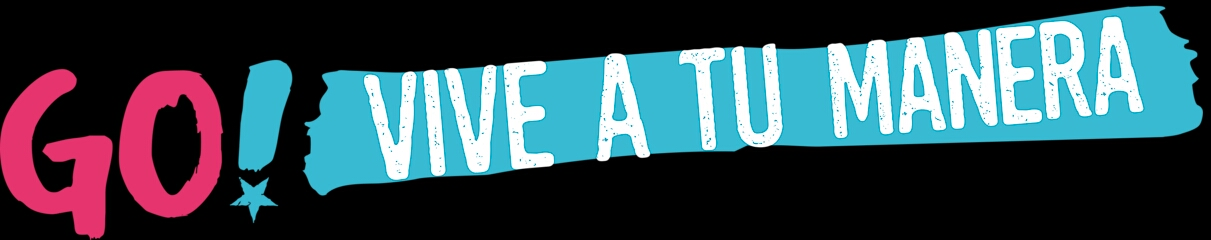
- Spanish: Go! Vive a tu Manera
- Genre: Musical; Romance
- Created by: Sebastián Mellino
- Written by: Patricia Maldonado
- Directed by: Sebastián Mellino
- Starring: Pilar Pascual; Renata Toscano; José Giménez Zapiola; Santiago Sáez; Gastón Ricaud; Laura Azcurra; Axel Muñiz; Carmela Barsamián; Paulo Sánchez Lima; Majo Cardozo; Majo Chicar; Bautista Lena; Manuel Ramos; Daniel Rosado; Simón Hempe; Carolina Domenech; Antonella Carabelli; Nicole Luis; Ana Paula Pérez; Sofía Morandi; Agustina Mindlin
- Country of origin: Argentina
- Original language: Spanish
- No. of seasons: 2
- No. of episodes: 30

Production
- Executive producers: Martín Kweller; Víctor Tevah; Nicolás Mellino
- Production companies: Onceloops; Kuarzo Entertainment Argentina

Original release
- Network: Netflix
- Release: February 22 – June 22, 2019

Related
- Secrets of Summer

Go! Live Your Way (Spanish: Go! Vive a tu manera) is an Argentine musical romance television series created by Sebastián Mellino. The story follows a musically skilled teenager, Mía Cáceres, who wins a scholarship to study at a prestigious academy, where her path to achieving her goal will not be easy, since she will have to face the injustices that stand between her and her dream. In Season 2, she sets out looking for her father. The series, directed by its creator Sebastián Mellino, stars Pilar Pascual, Renata Toscano Bruzon, José Giménez Zapiola, Santiago Sáez, Gastón Ricaud and Laura Azcurra, as well as Axel Muñiz, Carmela Barsamián, Paulo Sánchez Lima, María José Cardozo, María José Chicar, Bautista Lena, Manuel Ramos, Daniel Rosado, Simón Hempe, Carolina Domenech and Antonella Carabelli. It is the second Argentine Netflix Original Series after Edha.

The first season of fifteen episodes was released on Netflix on 22 February 2019. The second season, which also consists of fifteen episodes, was released on the 21 June 2019. A spin-off film titled Go! The Unforgettable Party (Spanish: Go! La Fiesta Inolvidable) was released in November 15, 2019 on Netflix. Even though a third season had been announced in February 2020 on the show’s official Instagram page, Pascual confirmed in August 2020 that the series had been cancelled, even though it was still unconfirmed by Netflix. As of February 2021, most of the cast members of the series had moved on to other projects, including the Argentine series “Mi Amigo Hormiga” (English: My Ant Friend), the Disney+ Latin America series “Intertwined”, and the Netflix Latin America series “Cielo Grande" (English: Secrets of Summer).

== Plot ==
Mia Caceres (Pilar Pascual) is a talented singer/dancer, who wants to pursue her dreams of being a musician. She is the lead singer of her band, Sold Out, she started alongside her lifelong best friend Gaspar Fontan (Axel Muñiz). However, she wants to pursue her dreams by auditioning for a scholarship at the prestigious boarding school known for its elite dancing and singing workshop - Saint Mary. After much discussion with her aunt Isabel (Melania Lenoir), she finally agrees. Mia auditions, but doesn't get a Scholarship, and goes home devastated. Her aunt says they'll find the perfect school for her in Spain, where her son lives. But what Mia doesn't know is that Isabel went to talk to Ramiro Achával (Gaston Ricaud), who happens to be the owner of the school and used to be in a relationship with Marianna Caceres (Mia's mother). Ramiro decides to tell Gloria, the secretary to make a call and accept Mia into the school, behind Mercedes' (Laura Azcurra) (the principal and Ramiro's wife) back.

Isabel lets Mia enter the school, but Mia has no idea what's about to happen to her life. She and her best friends, Zoe (Carmela Barsamien) and Simon (Paulo Sanchez Lima) enter the Go workshop, however, Mia must face the daughter of the school owner, Lupe (Renata Toscano Bruzón). Lupe is the most talented and the most popular in the school, but since Mia came, all the attention went to Mia, so she gets jealous. Lupe tries everything to get Mia kicked out of the workshop, but Mia does not give up. Both Lupe and Mia face many fights with each other, but Mia doesn't want to hurt Lupe, so she tries to make peace with her, however that does not work out at all. Lupe gets even more jealous of Mia, which creates a strong rivalry between Mia, Lupe and Lupe's mother, Mercedes (the principal). And with all that happening, she also has to face Alvaro and Juanma, who both like Mia. Alvaro is the captain of the basketball team and Lupe's brother, therefore Zoe tells her not to get involved with his life, but Alvaro tries to convince Mia to be with him.

Alvaro's main rival is Juanma who is Lupe's stuck-up boyfriend, who secretly likes Mia. Juanma eventually dumps Lupe to be with Mia, which causes more conflict between Lupe and Mia. When Alvaro goes disappears, Mia goes to find him by the lake (their special place together). She finds him playing a song that he writes for the two of them. When the song is over the express their feelings for each other, and kiss. When she gets back to the school,she tells her best friend Zoe about what happens. Mia state that she is so confused because she also likes Juanma! Mia soon realizes that her kiss with Alvaro made her feel things that she didn't know she could feel, and goes and accepts Alvaro's proposal to be his girlfriend. Even though Juanma is upset by this he understands, because he is a great friend to Mia and says he won't let his feelings get in the way. When Lupe and Mia finally start to get along, things are shaken up when Ramiro finds a document that says Mia is his daughter, and Lupe finds it! The show follows Mia's and other characters' lives at the school, their conflicts and their love lives.

== Cast ==
=== Main ===
- Pilar Pascual as Mía Cáceres
- José Gimenez Zapiola as Álvaro Paz
- Renata Toscano as Lupe Achával
- Santiago Saez as Juanma Portolesi
- Axel Muñiz as Gaspar Fontán
- Carmela Barsamian as Zoe Celetian
- Paulo Sanchez Lima as Simon (Last name is currently unknown.)
- María José (Majo) Cardozo as Agustina
- María José (Majo) Chicar as Sofia
- Gaston Ricaud as Ramiro Achával
- Laura Azcurra as Mercedes Achával

=== Recurring ===
- Simón Hempe as Federico Nacas
- Daniel Rosado as Nicolás Longo
- Manuel Ramos as Tobias Acera
- Bautista Lena as Martín Beltrán
- Antonella Carabelli as Olivia Andrade
- Carolina Domenech as Lola
- Nicole Luis as Ivana
- Ana Paula Pérez as Martina
- Sofía Morandi as Nina Canale
- Agustina Mindlin as Mara Mucci
- Andrés Montorfano as Mauro Moreira
- Ana Florencio Gutiérrez as Gloria
- Gonzalo Revoredo as Marcelo Villa
- Florencia Benitez as Florencia
- Josefina Achával as Mariana Cáceres
- Melania Lenoir as Isabel Cáceres
- Samuel Nascimento as Fabricio
- Johanna Francella as Rosario
- Yosy Machado as Yosy
- Luisa Drozdek as Teresa
- Daniel Campomenosi as Javier Paz
- Marina Castillo as Hortensia
