= Fernando Dente =

Argentine actor, singer, dancer, theater director and TV presenter

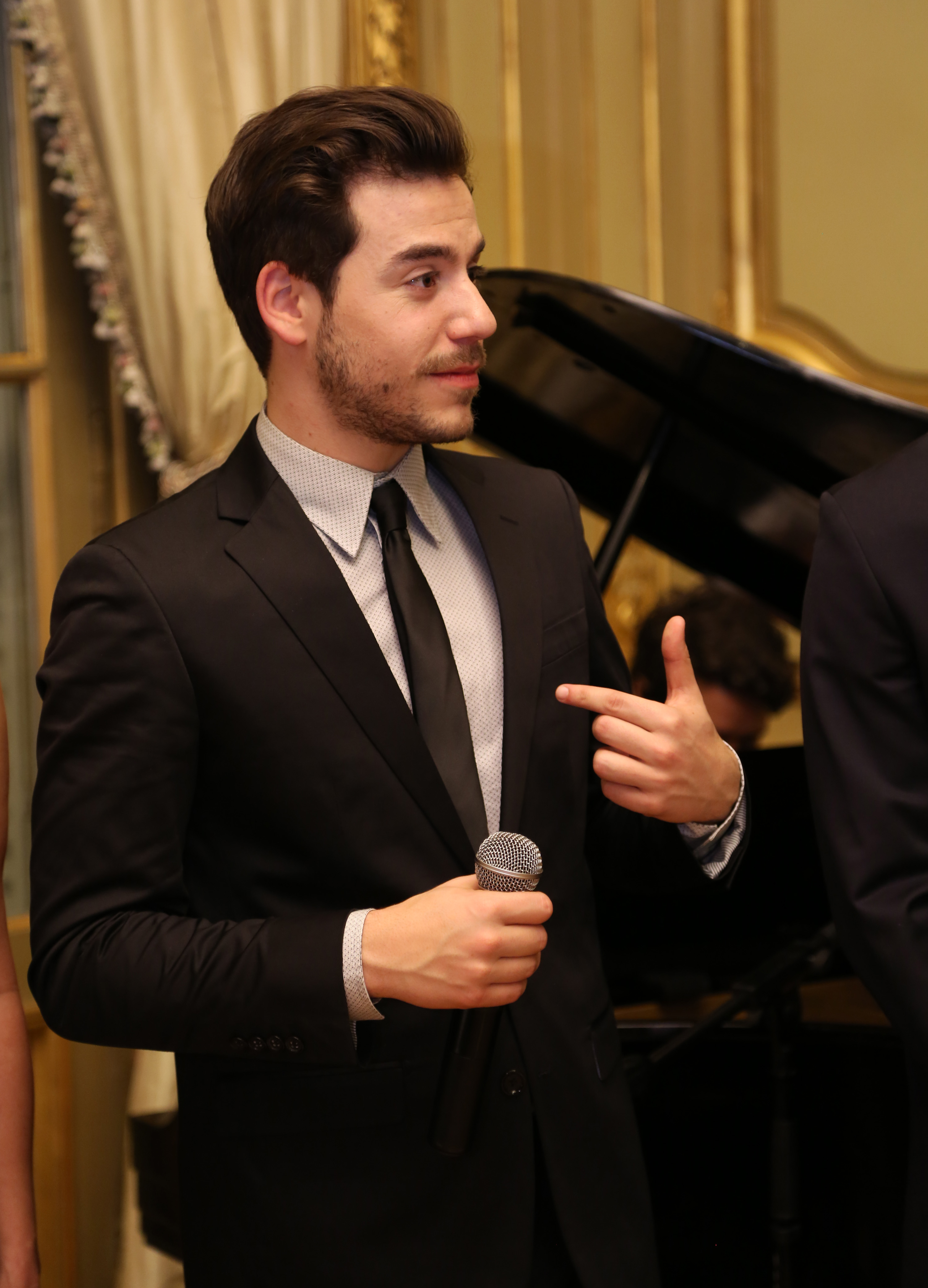
- Fernando Dente in 2015
- Born: January 7, 1990 (age 36); Buenos Aires, Argentina
- Occupations: Actor; singer; dancer; theater director
- Years active: 2008–present

Fernando Dente (born January 7, 1990, in Buenos Aires) is an Argentine actor, singer, dancer, theater director and TV presenter. He is known for winning the reality High School Musical: La Selección and later for his main role in High School Musical: El Desafío, for which he competed in the same competition. He was in "tu cara me suena"

== Early life ==
Fernando has three brothers: Guido, Lucas and Thomas Dente. Since his childhood, Fernando has two great passions: riding, and musical comedy. He studied at the Colegio La Salle in the neighborhood of Flores (in Buenos Aires) and was trained in musical theater and comedy with Hugo Midon (1944–2011). In 2009 his mother, Ada Rizzuti died. Later in March 2014, his father José died as well.

== Career in Film and Television ==
=== High School Musical: The Selection ===
In 2007, Fernando joined the group of twenty selected from 26,000 applicants, who would participate in the reality High School Musical: Selection. This cycle was intended to choose the players for the local film adaptation of Disney High School Musical, High School Musical: El Desafio. On Sunday, October 21, 2007, the end of the cycle took place, in which both Fernando Dente and Agustina Vera became the winners of the cycle after beating Gaston Vietto and Sofia Aguero Petros, earning the right to star Troy and Gabriella in the national version of the film.

=== High School Musical: El Desafío ===
In 2008 he starred in High School Musical: El Desafío. In this film he played a young captain of a rugby team. The film was released on Thursday, July 17, 2008, in Argentina.

== Filmography ==
Film and television roles
Year	Title	Role	Notes
2007	High School Musical: La Selección	Himself - Contestant	Winner
2008	High School Musical: El Desafío	Fer	
2009	Enseñame a vivir	Miguel Angel "Macu"	59 episodes
2011	Tiempo de pensar		2 episodes; guest role
2012	Historia Clinica	Alejandro Storni	
2014	Violetta	Martín Rosetti	Recurring role; 7 episodes
2014	Tu cara me suena 2	Himself - Contestant	Runner-up
2015	Bailando 2015	Himself - Contestant	20th eliminated
2016	Al Borde	Franco	
2019	Bailando 2019	Himself - Contestant	20th eliminated
2019–2021	Bia	Victor Gutiérrez	Main role
2022	¿Quién es la máscara?	Brillo, the unicorn	Winner
2022	O Coro: Sucesso, Aqui vou eu	Freddy	

== Discography ==
Year	Title	Record Company
2007	Acting, dancing, singing	Sony BMG
2008	High School Musical: El Desafío	Sony BMG
2009	Enseñame a vivir	Metronome
2013	Next to Normal	Palermo Films

== Awards and nominations ==
Year	Prize	Category	Work	Result
2008	ACE Award	Breakthrough Male	Hairspray	Nominated
2008	Clarin Entertainment Awards	Male Newcomer in theater	Hairspray	Won
2010	ACE Award	Musical actor	Spring Awakening	Nominated
2010	Hugo Awards	Best Actor in musical off	Musicool	Nominated
2010	Hugo Awards	Best actor in musical	Spring Awakening	Won
2011	Florencio Sánchez Award	Musical performance	Spring Awakening	Nominated
2011	ACE Award	Male musical performance, music hall and / or coffee concert	Musicool	Nominated
2012	Hugo Awards	Best performance male cast	Next to Normal	Nominated
2013	Florencio Sánchez Award	Musical performance	Next to Normal	Nominated
2013	Hugo Awards	Male Performer in child-youth	Tanguito mine	Nominated
2014	Florencio Sánchez Award	Best Actor in a Musical	Fierce Tango	Nominated
2015	Kids Choice Awards Argentina	Favorite actor	–	Nominated
2016	Awards "VOS"	Best singer	Stravaganza: No Rules for Love	Nominated
2016	Carlos Awards	Breakthrough Male	Stravaganza: No Rules for Love	Nominated
2016	Carlos Awards	Best Singer in Show	Stravaganza: No Rules for Love	Nominated
