= The Chorus: Success, Here I Go =

2022 Brazilian television series

- Portuguese: O Coro: Sucesso, Aqui vou eu
- Genre: Drama; Musical
- Created by: Miguel Falabella
- Written by: Miguel Falabella; Rosana Hermann
- Directed by: Miguel Falabella; Cininha de Paula
- Country of origin: Brazil
- Original language: Portuguese
- No. of seasons: 1
- No. of episodes: 10

Production
- Production location: São Paulo
- Cinematography: José Roberto Eliezer
- Running time: 45 minutes
- Production companies: Nonstop; Formata Produções e Conteúdo

Original release
- Network: Disney+
- Release: September 28, 2022

The Chorus: Success, Here I Go (Portuguese: O Coro: Sucesso, Aqui vou eu) is a Brazilian musical drama television series created by Miguel Falabella. The series is produced by the companies Nonstop and Formata Produções e Conteúdo on behalf of The Walt Disney Company. In Brazil, the series premiered on Disney+ on September 28, 2022.

== Plot ==
Young adults from a wide variety of backgrounds answer the audition call for a place in a renowned musical theater company in Brazil. They see it as a chance to rekindle their dreams, which have long since faded into the background, and to set new goals for themselves as they pursue a career in musical theater. Encouraged by mastering the first major hurdle, the aspiring singers and actors go through a colorful roller coaster of emotions in which not only their fascination with the multifaceted world of musical theater is strengthened, but they are also confronted with various forms of love, the ghosts of their past, betrayal and the fear of failure. Because one thing is certain: from one day to the next, both their dreams and their future opportunities can vanish into thin air if they don't get ahead.

== Cast ==
- Miguel Falabella as Renato Milva
- Gabriella Di Grecco as Nora Labbra
- Sara Sarres as Marita Bell
- Karin Hils as Marion de Almeida
- Lucas Wickhaus as Jorge
- Daniel Rangel as Leandro
- Micaela Díaz as Alícia Peralta
- Gabriel Hipólito as Reginaldo
- Graciely Junqueira as Ivone
- Carolina Amaral as Antonia
- Rhener Freitas as Maurício Sombah
- Bruno Boer as Sissy
- Guilherme Magon as Artur
- Magno Bandarz as Fernando
- Adriano Fanti as Norman

== Episodes ==
| No. overall | No. in season | Title | Directed by | Written by | Original release date |
|---|---|---|---|---|---|
| 1 | 1 | "Do You Know What It's Like to Be in Love?" "Você Sabe o que é ter um Amor?" | Cininha de Paula & Miguel Falabella | Miguel Falabella & Rosana Hermann | September 28, 2022 |
| 2 | 2 | "Scandalous" "Berrante" | Cininha de Paula & Miguel Falabella | Miguel Falabella & Rosana Hermann | September 28, 2022 |
| 3 | 3 | "All Forms of Love" "Toda Forma de Amor" | Cininha de Paula & Miguel Falabella | Miguel Falabella & Rosana Hermann | September 28, 2022 |
| 4 | 4 | "Love is my Homeland" "O Amor é meu País" | Cininha de Paula & Miguel Falabella | Miguel Falabella & Rosana Hermann | September 28, 2022 |
| 5 | 5 | "On the Edge of the Road" "À Beira do Caminho" | Cininha de Paula & Miguel Falabella | Miguel Falabella & Rosana Hermann | September 28, 2022 |
| 6 | 6 | "In the Prime of Life" "Flor da Idade" | Cininha de Paula & Miguel Falabella | Miguel Falabella & Rosana Hermann | September 28, 2022 |
| 7 | 7 | "Success, Here I Go" "Sucesso, Aqui Vou Eu" | Cininha de Paula & Miguel Falabella | Miguel Falabella & Rosana Hermann | September 28, 2022 |
| 8 | 8 | "The Rain that Drenched your Face" "A Chuva que Molhou seu Rosto" | Cininha de Paula & Miguel Falabella | Miguel Falabella & Rosana Hermann | September 28, 2022 |
| 9 | 9 | "Divine and Wonderful" "Divino Maravilhoso" | Cininha de Paula & Miguel Falabella | Miguel Falabella & Rosana Hermann | September 28, 2022 |
| 10 | 10 | "Try Again" "Tente Outra Vez" | Cininha de Paula & Miguel Falabella | Miguel Falabella & Rosana Hermann | September 28, 2022 |

== Soundtrack ==
List of original songs sung by characters from the series. The soundtrack recorded for the production is distributed by Universal Music and Walt Disney Records:

- "Nervos de Aço", Paulinho da Viola
- "Molambo", Maria Bethânia
- "Beatriz", Milton Nascimento
- "Carinhoso", Pixinguinha
- "Nuvem de Lágrimas", Chitãozinho & Xororó
- "Fogão de Lenha", Chitãozinho & Xororó
- "Pra Ser Feliz", Daniel
- "Pense em Mim", Leandro & Leonardo
- "Tempo Perdido", Legião Urbana
- "Toda Forma de Amor", Lulu Santos
- "Perigo", Zizi Possi
- "Lanterna dos Afogados", Os Paralamas do Sucesso
- "Exagerado", Cazuza
- "BR-3", Toni Tornado
- "Eu Quero é Rosetear", Jorge Veiga
- "Kiriê", Agepê
- "O Amor é o Meu País", Ivan Lins
- "Disparada", Renato Braz part. Theo de Barros
- "Sentado à Beira do Caminho", Erasmo Carlos
- "Devolva-me", Adriana Calcanhotto
- "Namoradinha de um Amigo Meu", Roberto Carlos
- "História de uma Gata", Os Saltimbancos part. Nara Leão
- "Tango do Covil", Garganta Profunda
- "Pedaço de Mim", Chico Buarque part. Zizi Possi
- "Flor da Idade", Chico Buarque
- "Balada do Louco", Os Mutantes
- "Mania de Você", Rita Lee part. Roberto de Carvalho
- "Caso Sério", Rita Lee part. Roberto de Carvalho
- "Sucesso, Aqui Vou Eu", Rita Lee
- "Manhãs de Setembro", Vanusa
- "Quem Eu Quero Não Me Quer", Núbia Lafayette
- "Eu Queria Ser John Lennon", Odair José
- "Você Não Me Ensinou a Te Esquecer", Fernando Mendes
- "Tropicália", Caetano Veloso
- "Baby", Gal Costa part. Caetano Veloso
- "Soy Loco Por Ti, America", Caetano Veloso
- "Divino Maravilhoso", Gal Costa
- "Lua Bonita", Raul Seixas
- "Gita", Raul Seixas
- "A Maçã", Raul Seixas
- "Tente Outra Vez", Raul Seixas
