= Giulia Guerrini =

Italian actress and singer

- Born: Giulia Danielle Guerrini Genusi; 4 September 1996 (age 28); Milan, Italy
- Occupations: Actress; singer
- Years active: 2015–present
- Musical career
- Genres: Pop
- Instrument: Vocals

Giulia Danielle Guerrini Genusi (born 4 September 1996) is an Italian actress and singer. She is also known for her performance as Rebecca Guglielmino in the television series Alex & Co. (2015−2017) and as Chiara Callegri in the Disney Channel Latin American series Bia (2019−2020).

== Life and career ==
Giulia Guerrini was born in Milan. She started her artistic career in theater plays in Rome and Milan: Alice nel Paese delle meraviglie (adaptation of 2010), Aladino e la Lampada Magica (adaptation of 2012), Quanto si Scambiano le Feste (2013), Il Viaggio (2014) and Little Shop of Horrors (adaptation of 2015). Since then, she has appeared in television series including Alex & Co. and Radio Alex, both in the role of Rebecca Guglielmino. In 2016, she was invited to the Radio Disney Music Awards. In the same year she played the role of Barbara Petersoli in the series Monica Chef. She had to move to Madrid and learn Spanish to be able to play the series.

In 2018 she moved to Buenos Aires, Argentina, and was selected to play Chiara Callegri, main character of the Disney Channel Latin American original production, Bia, starring Isabela Souza. Repeated her role in 2021 in the special movie for television Bia: An Upside Down World, exclusive of Disney+, which gave her a nomination for the Nickelodeon Mexico Kids' Choice Awards.

In 2022 she participate in the main cast of the Argentine Netflix Original Series Secrets of Summer, starring Pilar Pascual, Abril Di Yorio and Guido Messina, in the role of the villain Natasha Rossi.

== Filmography ==
Television roles
Year	Title	Role	Notes
2015−17	Alex & Co.	Rebecca Guglielmino	Recurrent (seasons 1−2) Main cast (seasons 3−4)
2015−16	Radio Alex	Rebecca Guglielmino	Recurrent
2017	Monica Chef	Barbara Petersoli	Main cast
2019−20	Bia	Chiara Callegri	Main cast
2021	Bia: An Upside Down World	Chiara Callegri	Special movie
2022	Secrets of Summer	Natasha Rossi	Main role

Theater roles
Year	Title	Director	Notes
2010	Alice nel Paese delle meraviglie	Luca Spinelli	Adaptation
2012	Aladino e la Lampada Magica	Luca Spinelli	Adaptation
2013	Quanto si Scambiano le Feste	Luca Spinelli	
2014	Il Viaggio	Luca Spinelli	
2015	Little Shop of Horrors	Luca Spinelli	Adaptation

== Discography ==
=== Soundtracks ===
- 2016 – We Are One (of Alex & Co.)
- 2017 – Monica Chef (of Monica Chef)
- 2019 – Así yo soy (of Bia)
- 2019 – Si Vuelvo a Nacer (of Bia)
- 2020 – Grita (of Bia)
- 2021 − Bia: Un Mundo al Revés (of Bia: An Upside Down World)

== Awards and nominations ==
Year	Award	Category	Work	Result
2021	Nickelodeon Mexico Kids' Choice Awards	Favorite Actress	Bia: An Upside Down World	Nominated
