= Julio Peña Fernández =

Spanish actor and singer (born 2000)

Julio Peña
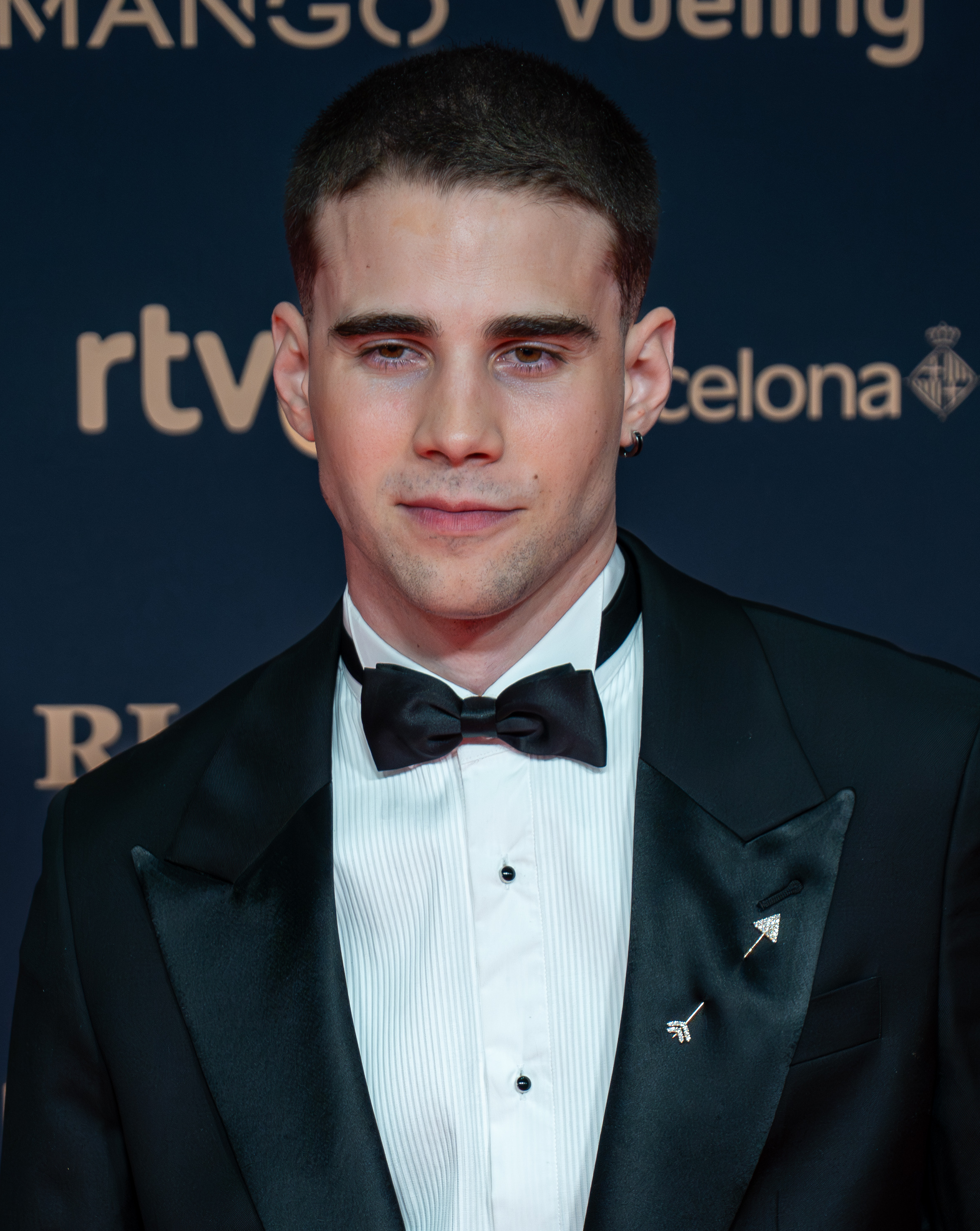
- Peña in 2026
- Born: Julio Peña Fernández; 15 July 2000 (age 26); San Sebastián, Spain
- Occupations: Actor; singer
- Years active: 2018–present

Julio Peña Fernández (born 15 July 2000) is a Spanish actor and singer who is known for his role as Manuel Gutiérrez Quemola in the Disney Channel original series Bia, as Ares Hidalgo in the Netflix movie Through My Window, and as Miguel de Cervantes in the 2025 film The Captive.

== Life and career ==
Julio Peña was born on July 15, 2000, in San Sebastián, Spain. However, he grew up in the city of Madrid, along with his parents and his sister named Emma Peña. In high school, he took theater lessons, and he attended acting workshops in the city. In addition, Peña took piano lessons for nine years.

Since 2012, he has appeared in several plays, such as: The Nightmare Before Christmas (2012), Miles Gloriosus (2013), Spamolot (2014), Mamma Mia! (2015) and Los Pelópidas (2016), in addition to starring in the musicals Alice in Wonderland (2017), Corpse Bride (2018) and Moulin Rouge (2018) at the Arcadia Theater.

In 2018, he was selected to star in the Disney Channel original series Bia, with the role of Manuel Gutiérrez. He got the role when he was at the Jana theater school in Madrid and the producers of the series went to do a casting to select the actor. Although at first he was reluctant to do it, they hired him after passing the final tests, moving to Buenos Aires. Thanks to his performance, he has been nominated for the Kids' Choice Awards Mexico in 2020 as favorite television actor, to the Most Listened Awards in 2021 as actor of the year and the SEC Awards in Brazil as best actor in a teen series. In 2021, he participated in the television special Bia: A World Upside Down on Disney+. That same year, he appeared in the musical Something Rotten!, translated into Spanish by Marcos Árbex and premiered at the Arapiles Theater in Madrid.

In January 2021, he joined the Spanish television series Acacias 38, where he played Guillermo Sacristán until the end of it in May of the same year. In April 2021, his casting in a Netflix original film was announced: Through My Window, based on the bestselling novel of the same name, where he plays Ares Hidalgo, the main protagonist. Months later, he participated in the music video for the song "Berlín" by Aitana, playing the love interest of Aitana (Miguel). He was part of the main cast of the play Embrague, written by Raúl Barranco and directed by Jacobo Muñoz.

In 2025 he starred in Alejandro Amenábar's Spanish language film The Captive (El Cautivo), based on Miguel de Cervantes's five years as a captive in Algiers. The film was described as "one of the biggest Spanish movies of 2025" and the first in which he played to a broader international audience.

== Filmography ==
Television roles
Year	Title	Role	Notes
2019–2020	BIA	Manuel Gutiérrez Quemola	Protagonist, 120 episodes
2021	BIA: Un mundo al revés	Manuel "El Puma"	Protagonist, especial of Disney+
2021	Acacias 38	Guillermo Sancristán	Main cast (season 7); 80 episodes
2023–present	Berlín	Roi	Main cast

Film roles
Year	Title	Role	Notes
2022	A través de mi ventana	Ares Hidalgo	Lead role
2023	A través del mar	Ares Hidalgo	Lead role
2024	A través de tu mirada	Ares Hidalgo	Lead role
2025	The Captive (El cautivo)	Miguel de Cervantes	Lead role

== Awards and nominations ==
Year	Award	Category	Nominated work	Result	Ref.
2020	Kids' Choice Awards Mexico	Male TV Artist		Nominated	
2021	Lo Más Escuchado Awards	Actor of the year		Nominated	
2021	SEC Awards	Teen series actor		Won	
2021	Kids' Choice Awards Mexico	Male TV Artist		Nominated	
2026	81st CEC Awards	Best New Actor	The Captive	Won	
2026	40th Goya Awards	Best New Actor	The Captive	Nominated	
2026	34th Actors and Actresses Union Awards	Best New Actor	The Captive	Won	
