= Bia (TV series) =

Argentine TV series

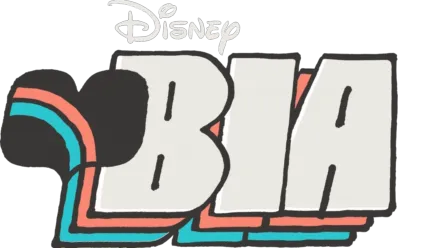
- Genre: Teen comedy; Musical; Romantic drama; Comedy
- Created by: Jorge Edelstein; Marina Efron; Carmen López-Areal
- Written by: Marina Efron; Carmen López-Areal; Matias Rodríguez; Laura Farhi; Ignacio Campón; Andrés Rappaport
- Directed by: Jorge Bechara; Daniel De Filippo
- Narrated by: Isabela Souza
- Country of origin: Argentina
- Original language: Spanish
- No. of seasons: 2
- No. of episodes: 120 (list of episodes)

Production
- Production locations: Buenos Aires, Argentina
- Running time: 33–42 minutes
- Production companies: Non Stop Producciones; Pegsa Group

Original release
- Network: Disney Channel
- Release: 24 June 2019 – 24 July 2020

Related
- Soy Luna; Violetta

Bia is an Argentine television series original of Disney Channel Latin America produced by Pegsa and Non Stop and Disney Channel Latin America in collaboration with Disney Channel Europe, Middle East & Africa (EMEA). Bia is the third original production of Disney Channel Latin America after Violetta (2012-2015) and Soy Luna, (2016-2018) and the fourth musical telenovela on the channel following the steps of Patito Feo (2007-2011), the show that paved the way for Disney's Latin series. The series directed by Jorge Bechara and Daniel De Filippo, stars Isabela Souza along with Gabriella Di Grecco, Julio Peña Fernández, Fernando Dente, Agustina Palma, Giulia Guerrini, Andrea De Alba and Guido Messina, as well as Daniela Trujillo, Micaela Díaz, Julia Argüelles, Alan Madanes, Rhener Freitas, Esteban Velásquez, Rodrigo Rumi, Luis Giraldo, Valentina González and Jandino.

Its first season of 60 episodes premiered on 24 June 2019, and concluded on 8 November 2019. In October 2019, it was announced that the series was renewed for a second season, which premiered on 16 March 2020 and concluded on 24 July 2020 after 60 episodes.

In November 2020, a special episode titled Bia: Un mundo al revés (Bia: An Upside Down World) was officially announced. It was released exclusively on Disney+ on 19 February 2021.

The series was cancelled after two seasons.

== Plot ==
The plot focuses on the 16 year old Beatriz "Bia" Urquiza (Isabela Souza), a girl who likes to draw. When Bia was very young, she loved making music with her older sister Helena (Gabriella Di Grecco), a singer and member of the band MoonDust, which included her boyfriend Víctor Gutiérrez (Fernando Dente) and his little brother Lucas. One day, the band was involved in a traffic accident, the only survivor of which was Víctor, who is now paraplegic and uses a wheelchair. Bia still suffers from the loss of her sister ten years later, and Víctor's family resents the Urquizas, deeming Helena responsible for the accident.

Bía develops feelings for Lucas and Víctor's half-brother Manuel. Their relationship earns little approval from their respective families, especially the eldest Gutiérrez brother Alex, who does everything in his power to meddle in their relationship. In addition, a mysterious young woman named Ana appears in the Residence Kunst, claiming to have a connection to what has happened in the past. Bia and Manuel attempt to navigate the pressures of their relationship while also uncovering dark secrets within the Gutiérrez family's past.

== Cast and characters ==
=== Main ===
- Isabela Souza as Beatriz "Bia" Urquiza.
- Gabriella Di Grecco as Ana Da Silvo / Helena Urquiza.
- Julio Peña Fernández as Manuel Gutierrez Quemola
- Fernando Dente as Víctor Gutiérrez.
- Agustina Palma as Celeste Quinterro.
- Giulia Guerrini as Chiara Callegri.
- Andrea de Alba as Carmín Laguardia.
- Guido Messina as Alex Gutiérrez.
- Daniela Trujillo as Isabel "Pixie" Ocaranta.
- Micaela Diaz as Daisy Durant.
- Julia Argüelles as Mara Morales.
- Alan Madanes as Pietro Benedetto Junior.
- Rhener Freitas as Thiago Kunst.
- Esteban Velásquez as Guillermo Ruiz.
- Rodrigo Rumi as Marcos Golden.
- Luis Giraldo as Jhon Caballero (season 1).
- Valentina González as Aillén.
- Jandino as himself.
- Sergio Surraco as Antonio Gutiérrez.
- Estela Ribeiro as Alice Urquiza.
- Alejandro Botto as Mariano Urquiza.
- Mariela Pizzo as Paula Gutiérrez.
- André Lamoglia as Luan (season 2).

=== Recurring ===
- Florencia Tassara as Beatriz "Bia" Urquiza (child).
- Nicolás Domini as Lucas Gutiérrez.
- Sebastián Sinnott as Charly.
- Santiago Sapag as Milo.
- Simón Tobías as Hugo Landa "Indy House".
- Katja Martínez as Jazmín Carbajal (from Soy Luna, season 1).
- Mirela Payret as Lucía Quemola.
- Facundo Gambandé as Marcelo.
- Camila Vaccarini as Valeria.
- Ana Wasbein as Julia (season 1).
- Ana Carolina Valsagna as Florencia (season 1).
- Mariano Muente as Claudio Gutiérrez (season 1).
- Jimena González as Antonia Svetonia (season 1).
- Sebastián Holz as Silvio (season 1).
- Daniela Améndola as Chloe (season 1).
- Lourdes Mancilla as Camila (season 1).
- Nicole Luis as Soledad.
- Mariana Redi as Luciana.
- Neira Mariel as Uma.
- Ximena Palomino as Olivia (season 1).
- Malena Ratner as Delfina "Delfi" Alzamendi (from Soy Luna, season 2).
- Maximiliano Sarramone as Juan (season 2).
- Alfonso Burgos as Julián (season 2).
- Macarena Suárez as Trish (season 2).
- Hylka Maria as Alana (season 2).
- Felipe González Otaño as Zeta Benedetto (season 2).
- Leo Trento as Carlos Benedetto / Pietro Benedetto Mr. (season 2).
- Robbie Newborn as Ruben (season 2).
- Julia Zenko as a fortune teller (season 2).

=== Guest stars ===
- Sebastián Villalobos as himself.
- Kevsho as himself.
- Facundo Rodríguez Casal as himself.
- Connie Isla as herself (season 1).
- Gian Pablo "Giian Pa" as himself (season 1).
- Mario Ruiz as himself (season 1).
- Daniela Calle and María José Garzón "Poché" as themselves.
- Clara Marz as herself (season 2).
- Agustín Bernasconi and Maxi Espindola "MYA" as themselves (season 2).
- Paula Etxeberria and Aitana Etxeberria "Twin Melody" as themselves (season 2).
- Pautips as herself (season 2).

== Awards and nominations ==
Year	Award	Category	Recipient	Result	Ref
2019	Produ Awards	Teen Series	BIA	Nominated	
2019	Billboard Argentina	Best Ibero-American Musical Series	BIA	Won	
2019	Meus Prêmios Nick 2019	Favorite TV Show	BIA	Nominated	
2019	Meus Prêmios Nick 2019	Favorite TV Actress	Isabela Souza	Nominated	
2019	Tú Awards	Favorite Actor	Julio Peña	Nominated	
2019	Tú Awards	Favorite Actress	Isabela Souza	Nominated	
2020	Nickelodeon Meus Prêmios Nick	Favorite TV Show	BIA	Won	
2020	Prêmios Gardel	Best children's album	Así yo soy	Nominated	
2020	Prêmios Gardel	Best album by sound film / television	Así yo soy	Nominated	
2020	Nickelodeon Kids' Choice Awards Mexico	Favorite Actress	Isabela Souza	Won	
2020	Nickelodeon Kids' Choice Awards Mexico	Favorite Actor	Julio Peña	Nominated	
2020	Nickelodeon Kids' Choice Awards Mexico	Favorite Series	BIA	Nominated	
2020	Produ Awards	Teen Series	BIA	Nominated	
2021	Lo Más Escuchado Awards	Best TV Series	BIA	Won	
2021	Lo Más Escuchado Awards	Best TV Actress	Isabela Souza	Won	
2021	Lo Más Escuchado Awards	Best TV Actor	Julio Peña	Nominated	
2021	Latin Plug	Actor - Actress of the year	Rodrigo Rumi	Nominated	
2021	Latin Plug	Actor - Actress of the year	Micaela Díaz	Nominated	
2021	Latin Plug	Actor - Actress of the year	Valentina González	Won	
2021	SEC Awards	Best Teen Series	BIA	Nominated	
2021	SEC Awards	Best Teen Series Actor	Julio Peña	Won	
2021	SEC Awards	Best Teen Series Actress	Isabela Souza	Won	
2021	SEC Awards	Best Teen Series Actress	Gabriella Di Grecco	Nominated	
2021	Nickelodeon Kids' Choice Awards Mexico	Favorite Actress	Giulia Guerrini	Nominated	
2021	Nickelodeon Kids' Choice Awards Mexico	Favorite Show	Bia: Un mundo al revés	Nominated	
2021	Nickelodeon Kids' Choice Awards Mexico	Favorite actor	Julio Peña	Nominated	
2021	Nickelodeon Kids' Choice Awards Mexico	Favorite actor	Guido Messina	Nominated	
2021	Produ Awards	Teen Series	BIA	Nominated	
2021	Produ Awards	Favorite Actor	Rhener Freitas	Nominated	
2021	Produ Awards	Series Song	En tu cara	Nominated	
2021	Martín Fierro de Cable	Teen Series	BIA	Nominated	

== Episodes ==
Series	Episodes		Originally released	
Series	Episodes		First released	Last released
1	60	20	24 June 2019	19 July 2019
1	60	20	19 August 2019	13 September 2019
1	60	20	14 October 2019	8 November 2019
2	60		16 March 2020	24 July 2020
Especial			19 February 2021	

== Music ==
Walt Disney Records has released three soundtrack albums containing the music from Seasons 1 and 2.

Title	Soundtrack details
Así yo soy	Released: 14 June 2019; Label: Walt Disney; Format: CD, digital download
Si vuelvo a nacer	Released: 8 November 2019; Label: Walt Disney; Format: digital download
Grita	Released: 6 March 2020; Label: Walt Disney; Format: CD, digital download
Bia: Un mundo al revés	Released: 12 February 2021; Label: Walt Disney; Format: digital download

== Concerts ==
A first mini-tour titled “Bia Tour” was held in Latin America in 2019.

List of concerts, showing date, city, country, venue, tickets sold, number of available tickets, gross revenue and number of shows
Date	City	Country	Venue	Number of shows	Attendance	Revenue
14 June 2019	Buenos Aires	Argentina	Teatro Opera	1	—N/a	—N/a
15 June 2019	Buenos Aires	Argentina	Teatro Opera	1	—N/a	—N/a
21 June 2019	São Paulo	Brazil	Tom Brasil	1	—N/a	—N/a
23 June 2019	Mexico City	Mexico	Teatro Metropólitan	1	—N/a	—N/a

A second tour titled “Bia Live Tour” was planned in Latin America for 2020, but it was canceled due to the COVID-19 health crisis.

List of concerts, showing date, city, country, venue, tickets sold, number of available tickets, gross revenue and number of shows
Date	City	Country	Venue	Number of shows	Attendance	Revenue
21 March 2020	Buenos Aires	Argentina	Movistar Arena	1	—N/a	—N/a
22 March 2020	Buenos Aires	Argentina	Movistar Arena	1	—N/a	—N/a
24 March 2020	Buenos Aires	Argentina	Movistar Arena	1	—N/a	—N/a
14 April 2020	Lima	Peru	Plaza Arena	1	—N/a	—N/a
17 April 2020	Medellín	Colombia	Plaza de Toros La Macarena	1	—N/a	—N/a
19 April 2020	Bogotá	Colombia	Movistar Arena	1	—N/a	—N/a
21 April 2020	Panama City	Panama	Figali Convention Center	1	—N/a	—N/a
24 April 2020	Mexico City	Mexico	Auditorio Nacional	1	—N/a	—N/a
25 April 2020	Mexico City	Mexico	Auditorio Nacional	1	—N/a	—N/a
3 May 2020	Acapulco	Mexico	Forum de Mundo Imperial	1	—N/a	—N/a
6 May 2020	Puebla	Mexico	Auditorium GNP Seguros	1	—N/a	—N/a
8 May 2020	Monterrey	Mexico	Auditorio Banamex	1	—N/a	—N/a
9 May 2020	Monterrey	Mexico	Auditorio Banamex	1	—N/a	—N/a
13 May 2020	León	Mexico	Poliforum León	1	—N/a	—N/a
14 May 2020	Querétaro	Mexico	Auditorio Josefa Ortiz de Domínguez	1	—N/a	—N/a
15 May 2020	San Luis Potosí	Mexico	El Domo	1	—N/a	—N/a
16 May 2020	Guadalajara	Mexico	Telmex Auditorium	1	—N/a	—N/a
17 May 2020	Guadalajara	Mexico	Telmex Auditorium	1	—N/a	—N/a
6 June 2020	São Paulo	Brazil	Espaço Unimed	2	—N/a	—N/a
20 June 2020	Santiago	Chile	Movistar Arena	1	—N/a	—N/a

== Distribution ==
In the United States, the first season of the show was made available on Disney+ on 20 November 2020, with English subtitles. It is unknown if the second season will be made available.
