= Isabela Souza =

Brazilian actress and model (born 1998)

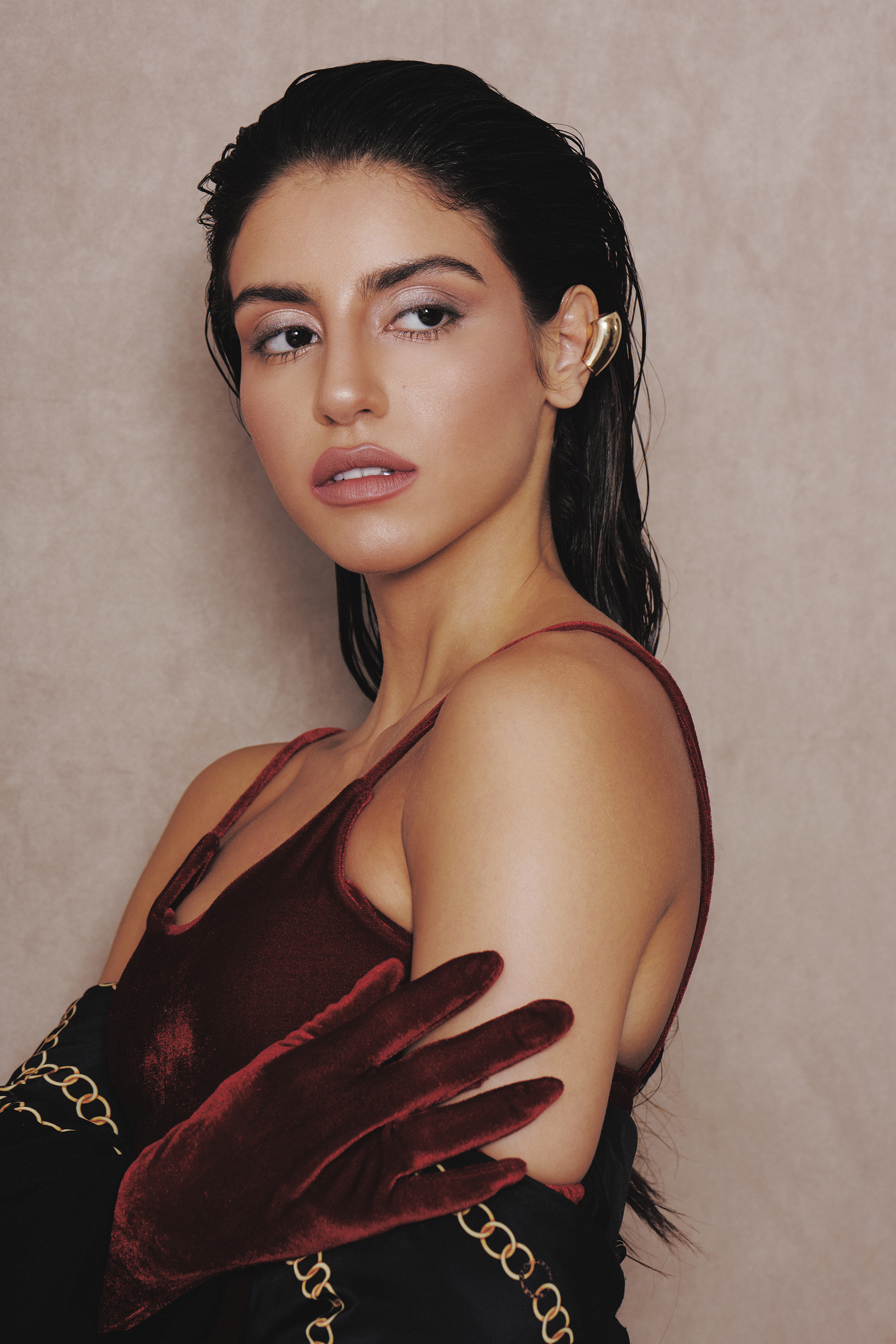
- Born: Isabela Soares de Souza; January 13, 1998 (age 28); Belo Horizonte, Minas Gerais, Brazil
- Other name: Isa
- Occupations: Actress; model; singer
- Years active: 2014–present

Isabela Soares de Souza (born January 13, 1998) is a Brazilian actress, singer and model who is known for her roles as Brida in the Disney Channel Brazilian series Juacas (2017–2019) and Beatriz Urquiza in the Disney Channel Latin America original series Bia.

== Life and career ==
Isabela Soares de Souza Marques was born on January 13, 1998, in Belo Horizonte, Minas Gerais. At age 10, Souza moved with her family to Rio de Janeiro and she began her artistic training at the Centro de Capacitação Profissional em Artes Cênicas.

Her first professional acting experience was in 2014, after participating in the play Verão Sem Fim. A year later, she was selected from a casting to play Brida in Juacas, an original series produced by Disney Channel Brazil, where she moved to Florianópolis to take surfing lessons and participate in the filming of the series. In 2018, she performed the song "Minha Vez", for the Brazilian soundtrack of the animated series Elena of Avalor.

In May 2018, she was selected to play Beatriz "Bia" Urquiza, the main character of the Disney Channel Latin American original production Bia, along with her co-star, Spanish actor Julio Peña, who plays Manuel Gutierrez. She had to move to Buenos Aires, Argentina and learn Spanish to be able to play the role. In 2019, she was selected to be part of the Latin American and Brazilian soundtrack of the movie Aladdin where she performed "Callar" and "Ninguém me cala", versions of the song "Speechless" in Spanish and Portuguese respectively.

In January 2020, it was announced that Souza would be part of the jury at the Viña del Mar International Song Festival in Chile. In April of the same year, was released "Vamos a mi ritmo", a song by Lasso in collaboration with Souza, which is part of the EP Cuatro temporadas: Primavera. The video was recorded in Mexico and released on April 24, 2020. In 2021, she released the singles "Anyone" (cover of Justin Bieber's single) and "Cliché", both in collaboration with the singer Vitória Frozi.

== Filmography ==
Television roles
Year	Title	Role	Notes
2017–2019	Juacas	Brida Januário	Main cast (season 1), 26 episodes Guest (season 2), 2 episodes
2019–2020	Bia	Beatriz "Bia" Urquiza	Main role
2020	Viña del Mar International Song Festival	Herself	Judge
2021	Bia: Un mundo al revés	Beatriz "Bia" Urquiza	TV special
2024–2025	A Caverna Encantada	Teacher Pilar Pinheiro	Main role
2024	Benefits with Friends	Catarina Malheiros	Guest star
TBA	Uma Garota Comum	Victoria "Vic"	Main cast

== Awards and nominations ==
Year	Award	Category	Work	Result
2019	Meus Prêmios Nick	TV Female Artist	Bia and Juacas	Nominated
2020	Kids' Choice Awards Mexico	Favorite Actress	Bia	Won
2021	Premios Lo Más Escuchado	Actress Of The Year	Bia	Won
2021	SEC Awards	Teen Series Actress	Bia	Won
2024	Prêmio Jovem Brasileiro	Best Actress		Nominated
