= Ukraine in the Eurovision Song Contest 2023 =

- Eurovision Song Contest 2023
- Participating broadcaster: Public Broadcasting Company of Ukraine (Suspilne)
- Country: Ukraine
- Selection process: Vidbir 2023
- Selection date: 17 December 2022

Competing entry
- Song: "Heart of Steel"
- Artist: Tvorchi
- Songwriters: Jimoh Augustus Kehinde; Andrii Hutsuliak

Placement
- Final result: 6th, 243 points

Participation chronology

Ukraine was represented at the Eurovision Song Contest 2023 with the song "Heart of Steel", written and performed by Jimoh Augustus Kehinde and Andrii Hutsuliak as the duo Tvorchi. The Ukrainian participating broadcaster, Suspilne, organised the national final Vidbir 2023 in order to select its entry for the 2023 contest. As the winning country of the 2022 contest, Ukraine automatically qualified for the final. Tvorchi performed in position 19 and finished in sixth place overall with 243 points.

== Background ==
Prior to the 2023 contest, Ukraine has participated in the Eurovision Song Contest seventeen times since its first entry in 2003, winning it the following year with the song "Wild Dances" by Ruslana. Following the introduction of semi-finals for 2004, Ukraine is the only country that has managed to qualify to the final in every contest they have participated in thus far. Ukraine has been the runner-up in the contest on two occasions: in 2007 with "Dancing Lasha Tumbai" by Verka Serduchka and in 2008 with "Shady Lady" by Ani Lorak. It won the contest for a second time in 2016 with "1944" by Jamala, and for a third time in 2022 with "Stefania" by Kalush Orchestra, achieving a record-breaking televoting score of 439 points. Ukraine's least successful result was 24th place, which they achieved as hosts in 2017 with the song "Time" by O.Torvald.

The Ukrainian national broadcaster, Suspilne, broadcasts the event within Ukraine and organises the selection process for the nation's entry. In the past, Suspilne had alternated between both internal selections and national finals in order to select the Ukrainian entry. Between 2016 and 2020, the broadcaster, in collaboration with commercial broadcaster STB, had set up national finals with several artists to choose both the song and performer to compete at Eurovision for Ukraine, with both the public and a panel of jury members involved in the selection. In 2022, the broadcaster opted to independently organise a national final to select the Ukrainian entry, a process that was used again for 2023. Production companies had the opportunity to submit their proposals from 9 to 30 September 2022, and the selected company, Starlight Media, was announced on 24 October 2022. The company previously produced the Ukrainian national finals between 2016 and 2020.

Following Ukraine's win in 2022, in accordance with Eurovision tradition, the European Broadcasting Union (EBU) initially gave Ukraine the opportunity to organise the 2023 contest. However, the EBU later determined that Ukraine was not able to meet the demands of hosting the event due to security concerns caused by the Russian invasion of the country, and that discussions would begin with the BBC for potentially hosting in the United Kingdom, which came in second place in the 2022 contest. The United Kingdom was subsequently confirmed as the host country of the 2023 contest on 25 July, with Suspilne working with the BBC to develop and implement Ukrainian elements for the live shows, and Ukraine being granted automatic qualification for the final.

== Before Eurovision ==
=== Vidbir 2023 ===
Vidbir 2023 was the seventh edition of Vidbir, the competition that determines the Ukrainian entry for the Eurovision Song Contest. The competition took place in the Maidan Nezalezhnosti metro station in Kyiv, and consisted of a final on 17 December 2022. The show was hosted by Timur Miroshnychenko, Kateryna Pavlenko and Zlata Ognevich, and broadcast on Suspilne Kultura, via radio on Radio Promin and online via Suspilne's Eurovision Song Contest website eurovision.ua as well as Facebook and YouTube broadcasts. The competition was also streamed live on the Diia mobile application.

==== Format ====
The selection of the competing entries for the national final and ultimately the Ukrainian Eurovision entry took place over three stages. In the first stage, artists and songwriters had the opportunity to apply for the competition through an online submission form. Thirty-six acts were selected and announced on to progress to the second stage, the longlist. The second stage involved the longlisted artists attending a scheduled audition during designated dates. Ten acts were selected and announced on 17 November 2022. The third stage was the final, which took place on 17 December 2022 and featured the ten acts vying to represent Ukraine in Liverpool. The winner was selected via the 50/50 combination of votes from a public vote conducted in the Diia mobile application and an expert jury, the members of which were chosen by the public. Both the public app voting and the expert jury assigned scores ranging from 1 (lowest) to 10 (highest) and the entry that had the highest number of points following the combination of these scores was declared the winner. Viewers participating in the public vote had the opportunity to submit a single vote via the Diia application. In the event of a tie, it would be decided in favour of the entry that received the highest score from the public.

==== Competing entries ====
Artists and composers had the opportunity to submit their entries via an online submission form which accepted entries between 17 August 2022 and 15 October 2022. Only artists that had not performed in events organized by/located in the territory of "the aggressor state" or illegally entered the territory of Crimea since 2014 were allowed to apply for the competition, and songs performed in the "language of the aggressor state" were prohibited. Musician Dmytro Shurov, who had been appointed the music producer of the competition, reviewed the 384 received submissions and longlisted 36 entries, of which their artists were announced on 27 October 2022. On 12 November 2022, Lue Bason withdrew from the longlist. Auditions were later held in Kyiv where ten entries were shortlisted to compete in the national final. The ten selected competing acts were announced on 17 November 2022, while the competing songs and the running order of the final were revealed on 1 December 2022.

Longlisted artists
- 2Tone
- Angelina
- Dayton
- Drevo
- Elysees
- Demchuk
- Fiinka
- Havkа
- Jerry Heil
- Iana Kovaleva
- Kozak Siromaha
- Krutь
- Lilu45
- ~~Lue Bason~~
- Max Ptashnyk
- Miia Ramari
- Moisei
- Olivan
- Oohla
- OY Sound System
- Royalkit
- Sasha
- Sasha Fadeeva
- Seréen
- Sexnesc
- Shy
- Skylerr
- Sowa
- Tember Blanche
- Tery
- Тónka
- Tvorchi
- Victoria Niro
- Vynohradova
- Zetetics
- Ziferblat

Artist	Song	Songwriter(s)
2Tone	"Kvitka" (Квiтка)	Mykola Havrysh, Oleksandr Dubina, Ihor Ivanovich, Anton Yemelyanov, Ivan Isaev
Angelina	"Stronger"	Anderz Wrethov, Angelina Terennikova
Demchuk	"Alive"	Vasyl Demchuk, Evgeniy Bardachenko, Tomash Lukach, Nazar Tumanik
Fiinka	"Dovbush" (Довбуш)	Iryna Vyhovanets
Jerry Heil	"When God Shut the Door"	Yana Shemaieva, Dimik Wheelson, Ivan Klymenko, Oleksandr Pryshliak, Stas Chorniy
Krutь	"Kolyskova" (Колискова)	Maryna Krut, Gerda Sonyash
Moisei	"I'm Not Alone"	Moisei Bondarenko
OY Sound System	"Oy, tuzhu" (Ой, тужу)	Taras Halanevych, Viktoriia Rodko
Tember Blanche	"Ya vdoma" (Я вдома)	Oleksandra Hanapolska, Vladyslav Lahoda, Oleksandr Musevych
Tvorchi	"Heart of Steel"	Jimoh Augustus Kehinde, Andrii Hutsuliak

==== Jury members ====
The members of the expert jury for Vidbir 2023 were selected via a public online vote in the Diia application. Nine candidates were presented to the public and a voting was open to all Ukrainian citizens from 31 October to 7 November 2022, with the three candidates topping the online voting being invited to become jurors of the show.

A total of 505,536 votes were received, and the top three of the voting were revealed to be: Taras Topolya (88,023 votes), Jamala (79,399 votes) and Julia Sanina (79,346 votes). The three were confirmed as jury members on 16 December 2022.

Jury member selection
Candidate	Occupation	Votes	Result
Jamala	Winner of Vidbir 2016 and of the Eurovision Song Contest 2016	15.71%	Selected
Julia Sanina	Member of The Hardkiss, runner-up of Vidbir 2016 and the co-host of the Eurovision Song Contest 2023	15.70%	Selected
Kateryna Pavlenko	Winner of Vidbir 2020 and Ukrainian representative in the Eurovision Song Contest 2021 as part of Go_A	9.20%	Not selected
Kostyantyn Tomilchenko	Creative producer, stage director of Ukrainian Eurovision entries in 2016, 2018, and 2021	1.85%	Not selected
Mykhailo Khoma	Frontman and founder of Dzidzio	12.60%	Not selected
Taras Topolya	Member of Antytila	17.41%	Selected
Tina Karol	Ukrainian representative in the Eurovision Song Contest 2006	15.67%	Not selected
Valery Kharchyshyn	Actor and TV producer, frontman of Druha Rika	5.77%	Not selected
Zlata Ognevich	Ukrainian representative in the Eurovision Song Contest 2013	6.09%	Not selected

==== Final ====
The final took place on 17 December 2022. Ten entries competed and the winner, "Heart of Steel" by Tvorchi, was selected through the combination of votes from a public televote and an expert jury. Ties would be decided in favour of the entries that received higher scores from the televote. As an intermission while the voting window was open, an hour-long documentary titled Kalush Orchestra, abo yak my perestaly khvylyuvatysia ta vyhraly Yevrobachennia pid chas viiny (English: Kalush Orchestra, or how we stopped worrying and won Eurovision during the war), which details Kalush Orchestra's participation and victory in the Eurovision Song Contest 2022, was aired. In addition to the performances of the competing entries, jury member Jamala, 2007 Ukrainian Eurovision entrant Verka Serduchka, 2022 Ukrainian Junior Eurovision entrant Zlata Dziunka and the competition's music producer Dmytro Shurov performed as guests.

Final – 17 December 2022
R/O	Artist	Song	Jury	Public vote		Total	Place
R/O	Artist	Song	Jury	Votes	Points	Total	Place
1	Moisei	"I'm Not Alone"	1	5,393	6	7	7
2	OY Sound System	"Oy, tuzhu"	5	2,496	2	7	8
3	Demchuk	"Alive"	7	3,936	4	11	5
4	Jerry Heil	"When God Shut the Door"	8	45,657	9	17	3
5	Fiїnka	"Dovbush"	6	11,109	7	13	4
6	Krutь	"Kolyskova"	10	33,614	8	18	2
7	Tember Blanche	"Ya vdoma"	2	3,411	3	5	9
8	Angelina	"Stronger"	3	2,424	1	4	10
9	2Tone	"Kvitka"	4	4,681	5	9	6
10	Tvorchi	"Heart of Steel"	9	54,041	10	19	1

=== Controversy ===
On 20 December 2022, Suspilne revealed that Krutь had appealed Tvorchi's win as a double of the main vocal could be heard during their performance, which was against the rules of Vidbir, as well as due to their entry being distributed by Believe Music, which still operated in Russia. Shurov, who was given the task of assessing Tvorchi's performance for possible violations, stated that he "does not believe that such non-compliance of the record with the requirements of the rules is essential for evaluating the performance", and noted that the duplicated vocal could also be a technical error due to difficult production conditions. The broadcaster also deemed that the issue with the label was not a violation of the rules and, therefore, decided not to rescind Tvorchi's win.

== At Eurovision ==
According to Eurovision rules, all nations with the exceptions of the host country and the "Big Five" (France, Germany, Italy, Spain and the United Kingdom) are required to qualify from one of two semi-finals in order to compete in the final; the top ten countries from each semi-final progress to the final. As the winning country of the 2022 contest, Ukraine automatically qualified to compete in the final on 13 May 2023. In addition to its participation in the final, Ukraine was also required to broadcast and vote in one of the two semi-finals. This was decided via a draw held during the semi-final allocation draw on 31 January 2023, when it was announced that Ukraine would be voting in the second semi-final. On 13 March 2023, during the Heads of Delegation meeting, Ukraine was drawn to perform in position 19.

The Ukrainian jury for the contest was, like in Vidbir, selected via a public online vote in the Diia application. Ten candidates were presented to the public and a voting was open to all Ukrainian citizens from 29 March to 5 April 2023, with the five candidates topping the online voting being invited to become jurors. The candidates were:

- Roxolana
- Olena Grebenyuk
- Mykhailo Klymenko
- Amador Lopez
- Antonina Matviienko
- Oleksandr Sydorenko
- Oleh Sobchuk
- Svitlana Tarabarova
- Yevhen Khmara
- Olena Shoptenko

A total of over 724,000 votes were cast, and the top five of the voting were revealed to be: Oleksandr Sydorenko, Svitlana Tarabarova, Antonina Matviienko, Oleh Sobchuk, and Yevhen Khmara.

=== Voting ===
==== Points awarded to Ukraine ====
Points awarded to Ukraine (Final)
Score	Televote	Jury
12 points	Czech Republic; Moldova; Poland; Portugal	Czech Republic
10 points	Cyprus; Georgia; Lithuania; Spain	Italy
8 points	Estonia; Israel; Italy	
7 points	Azerbaijan; Denmark; Germany; Ireland; Latvia	Estonia; Israel
6 points	San Marino	Moldova
5 points	Austria; Malta; Rest of the World	
4 points	France; Romania; Sweden; United Kingdom	Latvia
3 points		Armenia
2 points	Iceland	Azerbaijan; Lithuania
1 point	Armenia; Belgium; Norway	France

==== Points awarded by Ukraine ====
Points awarded by Ukraine (Semi-final)
Score	Televote
12 points	Poland
10 points	Lithuania
8 points	Estonia
7 points	Australia
6 points	Slovenia
5 points	Austria
4 points	Cyprus
3 points	Armenia
2 points	Georgia
1 point	Belgium

Points awarded by Ukraine (Final)
Score	Televote	Jury
12 points	Poland	Sweden
10 points	Finland	Lithuania
8 points	Croatia	Australia
7 points	Norway	Czech Republic
6 points	Moldova	Poland
5 points	United Kingdom	Estonia
4 points	Lithuania	United Kingdom
3 points	Sweden	Slovenia
2 points	Czech Republic	Italy
1 point	Israel	Israel

==== Detailed voting results ====
The following members comprised the Ukrainian jury:

- Yevhen Khmara
- Oleh Sobchuk
- Oleksandr Sydorenko
- Antonina Matviienko
- Svitlana Tarabarova

Detailed voting results from Ukraine (Semi-final 2)
R/O	Country	Televote	
R/O	Country	Rank	Points
01	Denmark	15	
02	Armenia	8	3
03	Romania	13	
04	Estonia	3	8
05	Belgium	10	1
06	Cyprus	7	4
07	Iceland	11	
08	Greece	14	
09	Poland	1	12
10	Slovenia	5	6
11	Georgia	9	2
12	San Marino	16	
13	Austria	6	5
14	Albania	12	
15	Lithuania	2	10
16	Australia	4	7

Detailed voting results from Ukraine (Final)
R/O	Country	Jury							Televote	
R/O	Country	Juror 1	Juror 2	Juror 3	Juror 4	Juror 5	Rank	Points	Rank	Points
01	Austria	17	10	7	11	14	13		21	
02	Portugal	16	20	9	10	17	14		22	
03	Switzerland	6	15	11	12	9	12		17	
04	Poland	10	5	4	3	2	5	6	1	12
05	Serbia	22	24	24	23	23	24		23	
06	France	14	9	12	22	18	15		12	
07	Cyprus	19	18	17	14	13	19		16	
08	Spain	15	17	16	2	19	11		24	
09	Sweden	1	7	2	1	6	1	12	8	3
10	Albania	23	25	20	15	20	23		25	
11	Italy	4	13	10	16	10	9	2	19	
12	Estonia	12	4	6	9	5	6	5	11	
13	Finland	13	14	21	18	21	20		2	10
14	Czech Republic	2	2	5	7	3	4	7	9	2
15	Australia	3	1	1	6	11	3	8	13	
16	Belgium	25	23	25	25	25	25		20	
17	Armenia	21	19	14	8	15	16		18	
18	Moldova	18	16	18	21	22	21		5	6
19	Ukraine									
20	Norway	20	21	22	19	16	22		4	7
21	Germany	24	22	23	20	8	17		15	
22	Lithuania	5	3	3	4	1	2	10	7	4
23	Israel	7	8	8	13	12	10	1	10	1
24	Slovenia	8	11	15	5	7	8	3	14	
25	Croatia	11	12	19	24	24	18		3	8
26	United Kingdom	9	6	13	17	4	7	4	6	5
