= Kostiantyn Sukhonosov =

Ukrainian musician

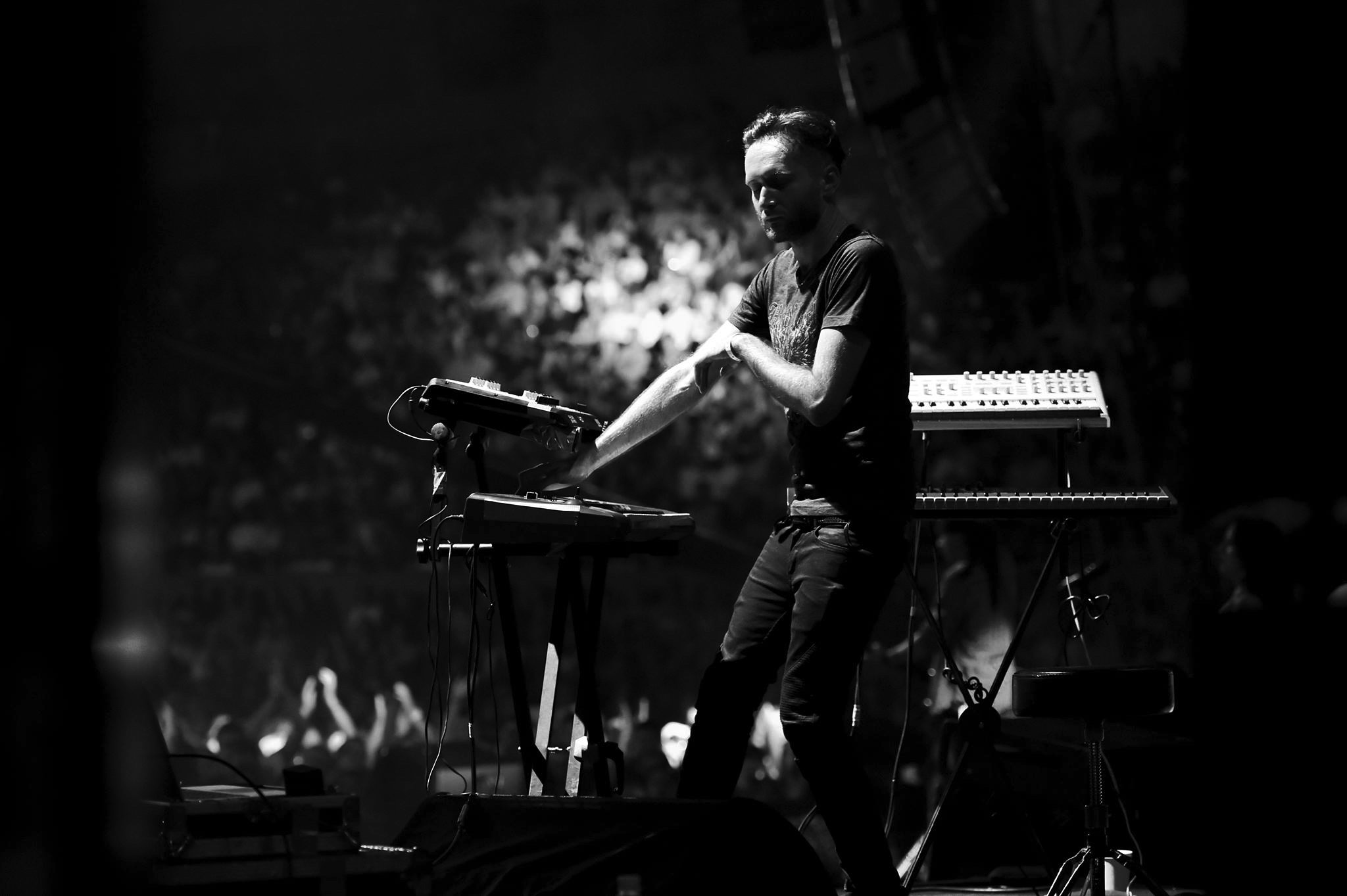
Concert in memory of Andriy Kuzmenko, Palace of Sports, Kyiv

Kostiantyn Sukhonosov (born 5 August 1983) (Ukrainian: Сухоносов Костянтин Анатолійович) is a Ukrainian sound producer, arranger, composer and most notably the keyboard player in Skryabin band since 2003.

== Biography ==
Kostiantyn was born into the family of small entrepreneur (father) and a school teacher of math (mother) in Kyiv Ukraine. He went to school #35 in Kyiv.

During this time he also studied playing piano in musical school for 7 years. In his 6th year of musical school, he and his friends created their first metal band “Cryptic voices”. After graduating from school, he studied accounting in College #11. His parents didn’t want him to become a professional musician, but after entering Kyiv Slavic University he was excluded after his first session because he went on tour with the band “Talita Kum” as a keyboard player. After that, he fully concentrated on playing and creating music.

In summer 2014 Kostiantyn got married.

== Career ==
Kostiantyn started his professional music career at the end of the 90’s. Since then he has been working as a keyboard player in the following Ukrainian bands:

- Cryptic Voices (1997 – 2000)
- Te Deum (2000 – 2002)
- Talita Kum (2002 – 2003) (Ukrainian: Таліта Кум)
- Tarshys (2003) (Ukrainian: Таршис)
- Skryabin (2004 – till now) (Ukrainian: Скрябін).

His most noticeable role was in Skryabin. He joined the group during the creation of their album "15 years" (Ukrainian: 15 років), released in 2004. In their next album “Tango”, besides keyboard parties, Kostiantyn made a remix on the song "People are like ships" (Ukrainian: Люди, як кораблі).

While Kostiantyn began his work in Skryabin band, he was also working as an arranger in Sergiy Dotsenko's recording studio "Kalina music", where he worked until 2006. During that time Kostiantyn was working on arrangements for Nataliya Mogilevska, Tetiana Piskariova and the members of TV-project "Shans" (Vitaliy Kozlovsky, Anna Maria). In 2006 he worked on the album "MoralEAST" for Anatoliy Vexlarsky ("Vexlarsky Orchestra” band) as a sound producer. In addition to all of this, Kostiantyn arranged the music for all the songs of the Skryabin band during these years. His nickname “Vojd” (from Ukrainian: Red chief) he got from Kuzma, because of his hair style.

In 2006 Kostiantyn started working with Oleksandr Yaremenko in his studio, where he worked as a sound producer and an arranger with the songs of such Ukrainian pop-bands as "SMS", "Blondie"and the project of Lana Merkulova “Red Fox”. In 2008 in collaboration with Andriy Kuzmenko he worked on the first single for both the Kuzma’s & Volodymyr Bebeshko’s project "Payushchie Trusy". In the same year Kostiantyn started his work with Ukrainian composer Vitaliy Volkomor on the songs for Taisiya Povaliy and the member of Ukrainian “Star Factory” Arina Domski. It was at this point in time that Kostiantyn, in conjunction with Oleksandr Sadovets and Oleksandr Fadeev, became a co-owner of NaHati Records recording studio. In his new studio he continued working with his previous clients and started working as composer and sound producer for the accomplished singer “Pyltsa”. He also worked on the first album of the talented member of "Star factory" show Vlad Darwin, and continued work on his next songs. In NaHati Records Studio, Kostiantyn began his work with Yurii Nikitin and his team, "Nikita" band, "neAngely" band, "Aviator" band and Olha Gorbacheva, he also arranged music for the international duo of girls, the band "А.R.M.I.A" and DJ Mendez. During the years of working in NaHati Records, the list of artists working with Kostiantyn has grown consistently. Among them are: DZIDZIO, Vova Zi Lvova, Sofia Rotaru, Amador Lopez and Rumbero's band, Dmitry Malikov, Ed Shulzhevskiy (actor of "Notre-Dame de Paris" musical), "Dress Code" band, Anton Lirnik. He also works with projects of Moon Records - Lavika, Tiana, "Social Classes" band, “Snegir” project. project. Kostiantyn has the amazing ability to create music in a huge variety of musical styles. He admits that his favorites are rock music, electronic music, dance music and R’n’B.

Kostiantyn plays many different musical instruments including but not limited to: keyboard, guitar, percussion, drums and bass.

After the tragic death of the leader and lead singer of the band "Skryabin" Andriy Kuzmenko, Kostiantyn took part in some concerts in the format of “Skryabin and friends”. In July 2015 he was present at the dedication of the memorial at the place of Kuzma's death.
