= Lama (Ukrainian band) =

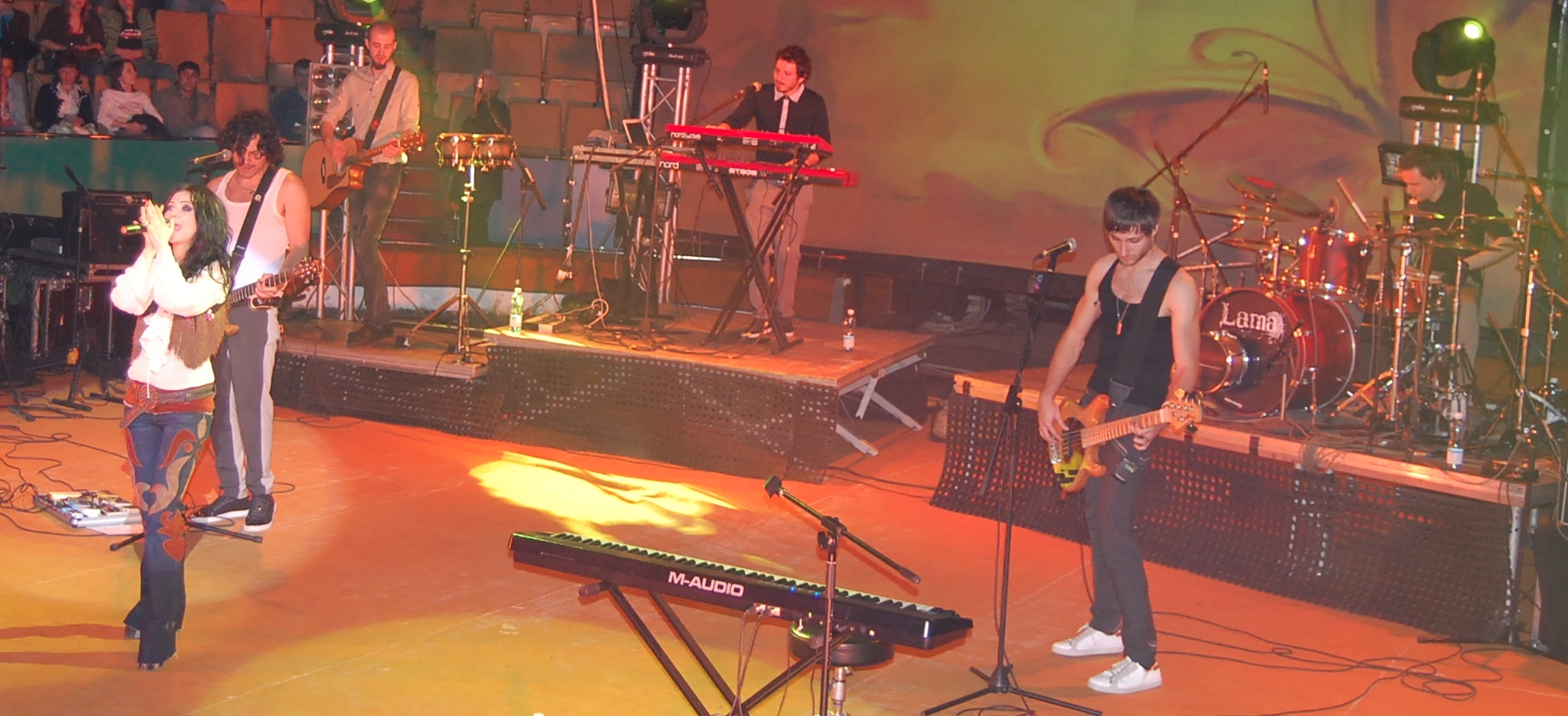
- Lama performing in Lviv

Background information
- Origin: Kyiv, Ukraine
- Genres: Pop rock; alternative dance; psychedelic pop
- Years active: 2005-
- Members: Natalia Dzeňkiv, Andriy, Zurik, Zi-Zi
- Website: lama.com.ua

Lama is a Ukrainian pop/rock band. It became popular after release of their first singles: "Meni tak treba" (I Need So) and "Moje sertse" (My Heart). Their third single was "Litak" (Airplane). Lama's first album Meni tak treba was released in 2006. The active members of Lama are Natalia Dzenkiv (vocals, lyrics), Andriy Aleksyeyev (guitar), Zurab Rogava (bass guitar) and Dmytro Suprunyuk (drums). In 2007 Lama got the Best Ukrainian act award of MTV Europe Music Awards.

Dzeňkiv has stated in interview that she is planning to record songs in English, and has no plans to sing in Russian.

== Discography ==
The discography includes three studio albums, 15 singles, one compilation album and 18 music videos.

=== Albums ===
- 2006: Meni tak treba (Мені так треба)
- 2008: Svitlo i tiň (Світло і тінь)
- 2013: Nazavzhdy (Назавжди)

=== Singles ===
- 2006: "Meni tak treba" (Мені так треба)
- 2006: "Moje sertse" (Моє серце)
- 2006: "Litak" (Літак)
- 2007: "Z tym, koho ľubyla" (З тим, кого любила)
- 2007: "Svitlo i tiň" (Світло і тінь)
- 2008: "Znayesh, jak bolyť" (Знаєш, як болить) #1
- 2008: "Ne Mama" (Не мама) #3
- 2009: "Ja ne ta" (Я не та) #2
- 2009: "Z dzherela" (З джерела) #3
- 2009: "Zhovte pole" (Жовте поле)
- 2010: "Trymay" (Тримай) #2
- 2019: "Dym" (Дим)

=== Compilations ===
- 2010: Trymay (Тримай)

=== Soundtracks ===
- 2008: Znayesh, jak bolyť (Знаєш, як болить) featuring the movie Sappho

=== Music videos ===
2000-s

Year	Name	Producer
2005	Мені так треба	brothers Stekolenko
2006	Мені так треба (Remix)	brothers Stekolenko
2006	Моє серце	brothers Stekolenko
2006	Літак	
2007	З тим (кого любила)	
2007	Світло і тінь	Євген Тимохін
2008	Знаєш як болить	
2008	Не мама	
2009	Я не та	
2009	З джерела	
2009	Не мама (Remix)	
2009	Hey you feat Друга ріка (Druha Rika) & Dazzle Dreams	
2009	Жовте поле	Obraz

2010-s

Year	Name	Producer
2010	Тримай	Alan Badoyev
2011	Не підведи	Alan Badoyev
2012	Пробач	Andriy Podolian
2013	Лиш тільки ти	Andriy Podolian
2013	Ангел	(brothers Stekolenko)

Preceded by award created	Best Ukrainian act award 2007	Succeeded by Incumbent
