= MTV Europe Music Award for Best Ukrainian Act =

The following is a list of the MTV Europe Music Award winners and nominees for Best Ukrainian Act.

== 2000s ==
Year	Winner	Nominees	Ref.
2007	Lama	Esthetic Education; Gaitana; Okean Elzy; VV	
2008	Quest Pistols	Boombox; Druha Rika; Esthetic Education; S.K.A.I.	
2009	Green Grey	Antytila; Druha Rika; Kamon!!!; Lama	

== 2010s ==
Year	Winner	Nominees	Ref.
2010	Max Barskih	Alyosha; Antibodies; DiO.filmy; Kryhitka	
2011	Sirena	Jamala; Ivan Dorn; Kazaky; Max Barskih	
2012	Alloise	Champagne Morning; DiO.filmy; Ivan Dorn; The Hardkiss	
