= Skryabin (band) =

Ukrainian band

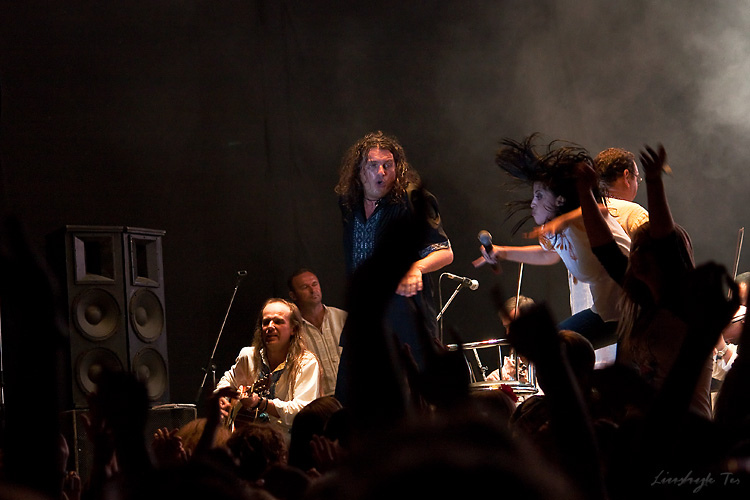

Background information
- Origin: Novoiavorivsk, Ukraine
- Genres: Alternative rock; new wave; synthpop; pop rock
- Years active: 1989–present

Skryabin (Ukrainian: Скрябін [ˈskrʲɑbin], also romanized as Skriabin) is a Ukrainian rock band, formed in 1989 in Novoiavorivsk. Andriy Kuzmenko was the band's lead singer until his death in 2015.

The group was named "Best Pop Band" in 2006 at the "ShowBiz Awards" held in Kyiv's National Opera House.

== History ==
=== Prior to formation ===
Andriy Kuzmenko began his career in 1983 after being inspired by the Scottish band "The Exploited" and fell in love with post punk music and from this. He began to go dance and go to discos and spread punk among youth.This is how the chain reaction group appeared in the assembly of the hall of the school where Andriy studied was used for group rehearsals. After he graduated from Lviv Medical Institute, in 1986 he met with Volodymyr Shkonda, who was a guitarist. They only listened to music for a while and later on Andriy called this the formation of the appearance of the group. They started creating music later in 1986, and in 1987 they wrote the songs "Lucky Now", "Brother", and "Yes, It Already Is". Andriy wrote songs in English then translated them into Ukrainian. He continued singing both solo and group until 1989.

=== 1989–1991 ===
From 1989 the band had formed and continued to make experiments with different music genres such as new-wave. The new underground album Feel the Pain («Чуєш біль») was released on 30 May 1989. It is a partially lost album that contained a lot of unknown songs from that period. A fragmental album was released for the English songs that were found (except "Nobody Fools After Me"). In 1990, the band remastered old recordings of older songs and began to release only Ukrainian songs. In 1991, they gave a concert in Odesa with the new song "On the Roof" («На Даху»).

=== 1992–1994 ===
After the dissolution of the Soviet Union, the group began to release techno songs which mostly appeared in the album Fish Language («Мова риб»), released in 1992 and remastered in 1998. The end of the period was signed with new song, "Train", and the album Birds («Птахи»).

=== 1994–2000 ===
The album Birds reached a lot of charts and became the earliest nationwide success they had reached. During this period, due to its popularity, Andriy Kuzmenko had to live in Kyiv for the invitation of the improved and modern studios. The album Fairytales («Казки») was released which made him enter into the Territoria "A" Ukrainian television back in 1996, when he gave a concert with the new song "Until Death and Longer" («До смерті і довше»). In 1999, the band released the new album Euterpa («Еутерпа») in Canada since it did not gain enough popularity in Ukraine. The album contained remixes of Ukrainian folk songs collected by Andriy Kuzmenko's mother, Olga. In the same year, the albums Worm («Хробак») and Technofight 1999 («Технофайт 1999») were released.

=== 2000–2003 ===
In 2000, the band split up, which caused the band to find a new direction. Their post-split albums include Striptease («Стриптиз») and Winter People («Озимі люди»).

=== After 2003 ===
During the Orange Revolution, Rostyk and Shura had publicly apologized on Channel 5 for participating in the 2004 Ukrainian presidential election.

After the release of the album Tango on 14 April 2005, the current composition of the band was established:

- Kuzma – vocals, music, lyrics;
- Oleksiy Zvolinskyi – guitars, arrangements;
- Kostiantyn Sukhonosov – keys, arrangements;
- Kostya Glitin – bass guitar;
- Vadym Kolisnychenko – drums;
- and later Olena Rozumna – backing vocals.

The album Glamour («Гламур»), released on 14 September 2006, sold 70,000 copies.

Skryabin's new album, About Love? («Про любов?»), was issued on 22 November 2007. Clips were shot for the songs "Oligarch Boys" («Хлопці-Олігархи»), "Shmata" («Шмата»), and "Moomin" («Мумітроль»)—the latter of which was officially banned on television due to the immoral content of the song. In January 2008, Olena Rozumna left the group in order to create her own project.

The band's next album, My Evolution («Моя еволюція»), was released in December 2009. Clips were shot for the compositions "Warm Winter" («Тепла зима»), "Kinuli" («Кінулі»), "Graduation" («Градація»), "Let Me Go" («Відпусти»), and "Quintus" («Квінти»). In support of the album, a concert tour of Ukrainian cities was organized.

On 21 May 2011, the group gave a concert in Saint Petersburg, Russia. A video for the song "Route" was filmed, in which the bands Payushchie Trusy and DZIDZIO starred. The clip was released in two versions: an abridged version shown on television, and a full version shown only on the internet.

In April 2012, a new album "Radio Love" was released, which included 10 compositions. A limited special edition of the album was also released, which included 7 more bonus tracks, as well as videos for the songs "Talking and Smoking", "Places of Happy People", and "Mom".

On 3 July 2013, in the Green Theater in Kyiv, the premiere of the new album of the band called Kind Soul («Добряк») took place.

In the spring of 2014, an all-Ukrainian tour was held in support of the album 25. As part of the tour, a big concert show was held on 4 April in the Kyiv club Stereo Plaza. Andrii Kuzmenko's book I, Pate and the Army («Я, Пейт і армія»), was also presented that evening.

== Death of Andriy Kuzmenko ==
On 2 February 2015, the leader of the band died in a car accident near the village of Lozuvatka, Kryvyi Rih Raion, Dnipropetrovsk Oblast.

On 20 May, a tribute concert dedicated to the memory of Kuzma took place in Kyiv. More than ten thousand people came to listen to the concert and honor the memory of the idol. The Palace of Sports, in which the concert took place, was full. The band's songs were performed by famous representatives of Ukrainian show business together with the musicians of Skryabin. A memorial sign was erected at the place of Kuzmenko's death.

== Today ==
The band continues concert activity. In particular, Zhenya Tolochnyi, Zhenya Halych and Yurko Yurchenko visited the soloist's place.

With the song "Suka Viyna", he participated in a campaign dedicated to the memory of Danylo Didik.

== Private archive leak ==
In 2015 and 2016, after Kuzmenko's death, an unknown user posted Skryabin's unreleased tracks from 1986 to the 2000s and 2010s on ex.ua, including demo tracks from before the band was even formed. The archive file also contained many unreleased songs from 1986 to the 1990s. After the incident, the whole forum page had lost all the files and pieces, these were most likely reposted to YouTube.

== Discography ==
This list contains only full albums excluding singles, compilations, remixes, lives and other projects.

- 1989 — Чуєш біль (Feel The Pain)
- 1992 — Мова риб (Fish Language)
- 1993 — Технофайт (Technofight)
- 1995 — Птахи (Birds)
- 1997 — Мова риб (Fish Language, re-released)
- 1997 — Казки (Fairytales)
- 1998 — Танець пінгвіна (Penguin Dance, a remix album)
- 1999 — Хробак (Worm)
- 1999 — Еутерпа (Euterpa)
- 1999 — Технофайт 1999 (Technofight 1999)
- 2000 — Модна країна (Fashionable Country)
- 2001 — Стриптиз (Striptease)
- 2002 — Озимі люди (Winter People)
- 2003 — Натура (Nature)
- 2005 — Танго (Tango)
- 2006 — Гламур (Glamour)
- 2007 — Про любов? (About Love?)
- 2009 — Моя еволюція (My Evolution)
- 2012 — Радіо Любов (Radio Love)
- 2013 — Добряк (Kind Soul)
- 2014 — 25
- 2015 — Кінець фільму (End of the Film)
