= Mykhailo Khoma =

Ukrainian singer (born 1983)

Mykhailo Khoma Михайло Хома
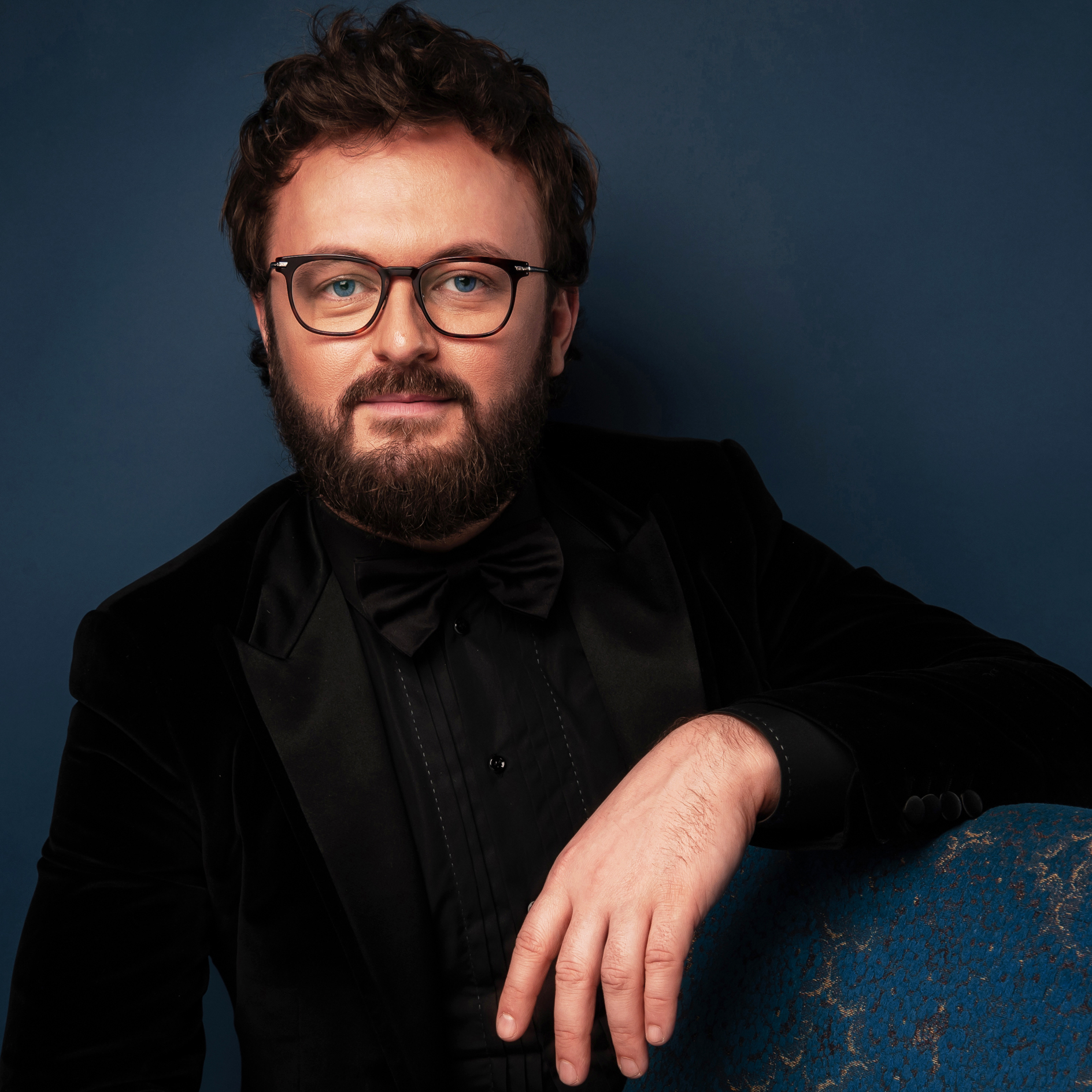
- Khoma in 2019

Background information
- Born: 20 November 1983 (age 42); Bortnyky, Lviv Oblast, Ukrainian SSR, Soviet Union
- Genre: Pop music
- Occupation: Singer
- Instrument: Vocals
- Years active: 1995–present
- Website: dzidzio.com

Mykhailo Stepanovych Khoma (Ukrainian: Михайло Степанович Хома; born 20 November 1983) is a Ukrainian singer. He holds the title of Honored Artist of Ukraine (2020). He is an ambassador of the Ukraine national football team.

== Early life and education ==
His father is Khoma Stepan Oleksiyovych, a veterinarian who graduated from Lviv Veterinary Institute, while his mother is Khoma (Markul) Halyna Yanivna, a printing technologist who graduated from the Printing College.

Khoma was born in 1983 in the village of Bortnyky (Zhydachiv district). The singer spent his childhood in the village but later on, at the age of four, he moved to Novoiavorivsk with his parents. In 1991 he joined the Novoiavorivsk school No. 1. His parents also enrolled him in a vocal and choral class at a music school of the same city. His first teacher of vocals was Omelyan Lesya Mykolayivna. She opened the world of academic vocals for Khoma.

== Career ==
Khoma is the winner of a number of contests and festivals: Peter Tchaikovsky Contest (first prize), Golden Trembitas (1996), "Jazz Singer" (1996, first prize), "Evenings over Latorytsia" (first prize), "Spivogray" (Grand Prix), "Flowers of Prykarpattia" (Grand Prix), "Black Sea Games" (2000, second prize), Young Galicia (1996 first prize, 1999, Grand Prix) and others.

=== 1998 ===
After graduating from music school, Khoma enrolled at the Lviv Music School where he studied at the Department of Conducting.

=== 2004 ===
In Lviv, Khoma created a band, Druzi, that performed at weddings and private events.

Khoma did an internship at the customs of the Krakovets checkpoint. Having realized that his main vocation was music, he interrupted the internship and continued his musical career.

=== 2008 ===
Khoma recorded a cover version of the song "Calendar" written by Andriy Kuzmenko and Oleg Turko. Having listened to the version of the song, Kuzmenko offered him to make a cover version of the song "Old Pictures". Subsequently, a video clip was made for it. Khoma initiated the name, "Dzidzio", this is how his Polish grandfather Markul Jan Kazymyrovych was called. Kuzmenko supported him, but later, on his recommendation, the image of "Dzidzio" was suspended. The "Sex Shop Boys" band was created instead, in which Khoma is the group's soloist.

Simultaneously performing at corporate events with the band Druzi ("Friends"), Khoma as the leader of the band entertains his friends with funny stories during breaks, using the manner of speaking of Nadsyansk district and an "old grandpa" voice. This is how Dzidzio's monologues were created and later gained wide popularity by transmission via the infrared port.

=== 2009 ===
Khoma is invited to perform at a private event, where he meets Anatoly Bezukh, the future producer of DZIDZIO. Since then, the logo is written in Latin. It was created (visualized) by Roman Cheryba, who gave it to Khoma for his birthday. The same year, the band DZIDZIO begins a new round. The duo "Sex Shop Boys" ceases its activity not having existed even a year.

=== 2010—2011 ===
Andriy Kuzmenko created the song "Yalta", after which he stopped collaborating with the duo "Sex Shop Boys", and Anatoliy Bezukh became a producer of the DZIDZIO band. According to the Ukrainian music publication Muzvar, the case of the band's breakup in 2015 and the conflict between the members was included in the TOP-5 most famous cases of breakups in the Ukrainian music industry.

=== 2011—2019 ===
The band DZIDZIO led by Khoma is actively touring and releasing new author's songs, supporting them with author's short films acquiring national love. They become an impetus for a feature film.

=== 2018 ===
This year, DZIDZIO again gathers the Arena Lviv stadium for the "Super-duper" mega-show dedicated to the release of a new album.

The actor also appears in the role of the director, author of the idea, producer and lead actor in the new feature film, DZIDZIO The First Time. The film won two Golden Whirlwind Awards (3rd Award Ceremony) in the Audience Choice and the Best Sound Director nomination.

On November 20, on the occasion of his birthday, Khoma gathered a full Palace of Sports in Kyiv with an audience of more than 10,000 people as part of the Super-duper tour. For the first time in Ukraine, the show used 400 square meters of solid LED screen and the most powerful lighting fixtures.

=== 2019 ===
Khoma performed the National Anthem of Ukraine before the match between the national teams of Ukraine and Lithuania, which surprised his fans and star colleagues. Since then, he has been an ambassador of the Ukrainian national soccer team.

At the end of the year, the artist began to work on a large project that combined an updated version of the anthem of Ukraine and a recording of the spiritual anthem of Ukraine – "O Great God Eternal." Khoma involved 100 young musicians under the direction of conductor Oksana Lyniv.

=== 2020 ===
This year, Khoma presented a video for the spiritual anthem of Ukraine "O Great God Eternal." The work on the recording took place at the Kyiv Recording House where more than 100 musicians and choristers can be recorded simultaneously. Oksana Lyniv was the conductor of the project. On August 24, he performed the anthem of Ukraine at the celebrations of the Independence Day of Ukraine and was awarded the title of Honored Artist of Ukraine.

=== 2022 ===
In April 2022, Mykhailo sang the song "Ukraine will win" together with Ukrainian artists, written by Oleksandr Ponomariov. Also involved: Taras Topolya, Yuriy Tkach, Yevhen Koshovyi, Petro Chorny.

Actively touring with concerts supporting the Armed Forces.

Since the beginning of Russia's full-scale invasion of Ukraine, he has been on the defensive on the cultural front. Mykhailo and his colleagues have given more than 150 charity concerts to raise funds to support the Armed Forces of Ukraine.

Together with Oleksandr Ponomarev and other artists, they recorded several songs "Ukraine will win", "On the ground, in the air and at sea".

=== 2023 ===
On March 7, 2023, Mykhailo Khoma and Oleksandr Ponomaryov presented a joint duet "Hey, Falcons".

Later in March, the artist presented a short, author's film "Who Are You". Description: A man challenges an infinitely long chain which is a symbol of human sufferings over the lifetime. The hero mystically enters a spiritual world where he has a conversation with God, yet this conversation in fact is with himself. In this dialog the Truth is revealed to him.

== Personal life ==
His wife is a native of Lviv, singer Yaroslava Prytula, known under the stage name SLAVIA. They got married in November 2013. Khoma met his future wife during the Moloda Halychyna contest, and later they sang together in the Druzi band. In April 2021, Khoma announced his divorce.

== Singles ==
No.	Name	Author of the music	Author of the lyrics
1	Вихідний / Weekend	M. Khoma	M. Khoma
2	Я і Сара / Me and Sara	M. Khoma	M. Khoma
3	108 / 108	M. Khoma	M. Khoma, Y. Tovstyga
4	Павук / Spider	M. Khoma	M. Khoma, V. Parfenyuk
5	Каділак / Cadillac	M. Khoma	M. Khoma
6	Сусіди / Neighbors	M. Khoma	M. Khoma
7	Банда-Банда / Banda-Banda	M. Khoma	M. Khoma
8	Не матюкайся / Don't curse	M. Khoma	M. Khoma, V. Parfenyuk
9	Я їду до мами / Going to my mom	M. Khoma	M. Khoma
10	Я міліонер / I'm a millionaire	M. Khoma	M. Khoma
11	Я люблю, Київ / I love Kyiv	M. Khoma	M. Khoma
12	Моя любов / My love	M. Khoma	M. Khoma
13	Зимова казка / Winter fairy tale	M. Khoma	M. Khoma
14	Мені повезло / I'm lucky	M. Khoma	M. Khoma
15	Сама-сама / On my own	M. Khoma, О. Turko	M. Khoma, О. Turko
16	Кобіта / Kobieta	M. Khoma	V. Baranov
17	Буську / Busku	M. Khoma, О. Turko	M. Khoma, О. Turko
18	Ja cie kocham / Ja cie kocham	M. Khoma, О. Turko	M. Khoma, О. Turko
19	Das ist gut fantastisch / Das ist gut fantastisch	M. Khoma, О. Turko	M. Khoma, О. Turko
20	ХА-ХА-ХА / Ha-ha-ha	M. Khoma, О. Turko	M. Khoma
21	3 в 1 / 3 in 1	M. Khoma	M. Khoma
22	Птахоподібна / Birdlike	M. Khoma	M. Khoma
23	Марсік / Marsik	M. Khoma	M. Khoma, V. Parfenyuk

== Distinctions, awards ==
- 1995 prize at the Peter Tchaikovsky Vocal Contest
- In 1996 won the first prize in the Young Galicia Contest
- In 1999 won the Grand Prix of the Young Galicia Festival
- In 2018, the film DZIDZIO Contrabass was awarded the Golden Whirlwind in the Viewer's Choice nomination.
- In 2019, DZIDZIO The First Time was awarded two Golden Whirlwinds in the nominations: "Best Sound" and "Audience Award".
- Since 2020 he is an Honored Artist of Ukraine.

== Filmography ==
Short Films

Year	Name	Director	Director of Photography	Screenwriter
2023	Хто ти? / Who Are You?	M. Khoma	M. Khoma	M. Khoma
2016	Марсік (без цензури) / MARSIK (no censorship)	M. Khoma	О. Roshchin	M. Khoma
2015	Я їду до мами / Going to My Mom	M. Khoma	О. Roshchin	M. Khoma
2014	Ангели чудяться / Angels Wonder	M. Khoma	О. Roshchin	M. Khoma
2014	Павук (без цензури) / Spider (no censorship)	M. Khoma	О. Pozniakov	M. Khoma
2013	Лист до Миколая / Letter to St. Nicholas	M. Khoma	О. Pozniakov	M. Khoma
2013	Повна срака (без цензури) / Full Shit (no censorship)	V. Shurubura	V. Shurubura	M. Khoma
2013	Народження легенди (мультик) / Birth of a Legend (animation)	KEMEO Studio	KEMEO Studio	KEMEO Studio
2012	ХА-ХА-ХА (без цензури) / Ha-Ha-Ha (no censorship)	V. Shurubura	V. Shurubura	M. Khoma
2012	Каділак (без цензури) / Cadillac (no censorship)	V. Shurubura	V. Shurubura	M. Khoma, О.Turko
2011	Сама-сама (без цензури) / Alone-alone (no censorship)	V. Shurubura	V. Shurubura	M. Khoma

Films

Year	Name	Director	Director of Photography	Screenwriter
2021	"Where is the money"	M. Khoma	Yuriy Korol	Mykhailo Khoma, Taras Dron Serhiy Lyba, Diana Iurash
2018	DZIDZIO The First Time	M. Khoma, Taras Dron	Oleksandr Roshchyn	Mykhailo Khoma, Taras Dron Serhiy Lyba, Diana Iurash
2017	DZIDZIO Contrabass	Oleh Borshchevskyi	Dmytro Iurikov	Volodymyr Nagornyi, Mykhailo Khoma, Serhiy Lavreniuk, Pavlo Sushko

Television

Year	Name	Role	Notes
2013	Sing if you can	Host	Singing and entertainment project
2016–2017	Ukraine Has Talent.	Judge	Judge
2019	Voices of the Children	Trainer	Contest for young singers
2019	Dancing with the Stars	Participant	Dance show
2021	The Mask	Detective	Entertainment show

TV Shows

Year	Name	Role	Notes
2015	Servant of the People (TV series)	Cameo	TV show
2019	Frozen	Main character	TV show
2020	Velyki Vuyky	Cameo	TV show
