= Heart of Steel (Tvorchi song) =

2022 song by Tvorchi

Single by Tvorchi

from the EP Heart of Steel
- Language: English, Ukrainian
- Released: 17 November 2022
- Genre: Future bass
- Length: 2:36
- Label: Best Music
- Composers: Jimoh Augustus Kehinde; Andrii Hutsuliak

Tvorchi singles chronology
"Вимкни телефон" (2022)	"Heart of Steel" (2022)

Music video
- "Heart of Steel" on YouTube

Alternative covers
- Eurovision version single cover

Eurovision Song Contest 2023 entry
- Country: Ukraine
- Artist: Tvorchi
- Languages: English, Ukrainian
- Composers: Jimoh Augustus Kehinde; Andrii Hutsuliak
- Lyricists: Jimoh Augustus Kehinde; Andrii Hutsuliak

Finals performance
- Final result: 6th
- Final points: 243

Entry chronology
- ◄ "Stefania" (2022)
- "Teresa & Maria" (2024) ►

Official performance video
- "Heart of Steel" (Grand Final) on YouTube

"Heart of Steel" is a song by Ukrainian electronic duo Tvorchi. It was written by Jeffery Kenny and composed by Andrii Hutsuliak, both of Tvorchi's members, and was released on 17 November 2022. The song represented Ukraine in the Eurovision Song Contest 2023 after winning Vidbir 2023, Ukraine's national selection; it finished in 6th place, gaining 243 points.

Written during the defense of the Azovstal steel plant in Mariupol in spring 2022, "Heart of Steel" talks about the dangers of nuclear warfare and discusses strength, courage, and bravery; the title alludes to a "heart of steel", worn down by difficulties and struggles.. The song's reception was mixed; some described it as mediocre and too rich in production while others said that the song was refreshing and cool. The song entered nine weekly chart and one monthly and yearly chart.

== Background and composition ==
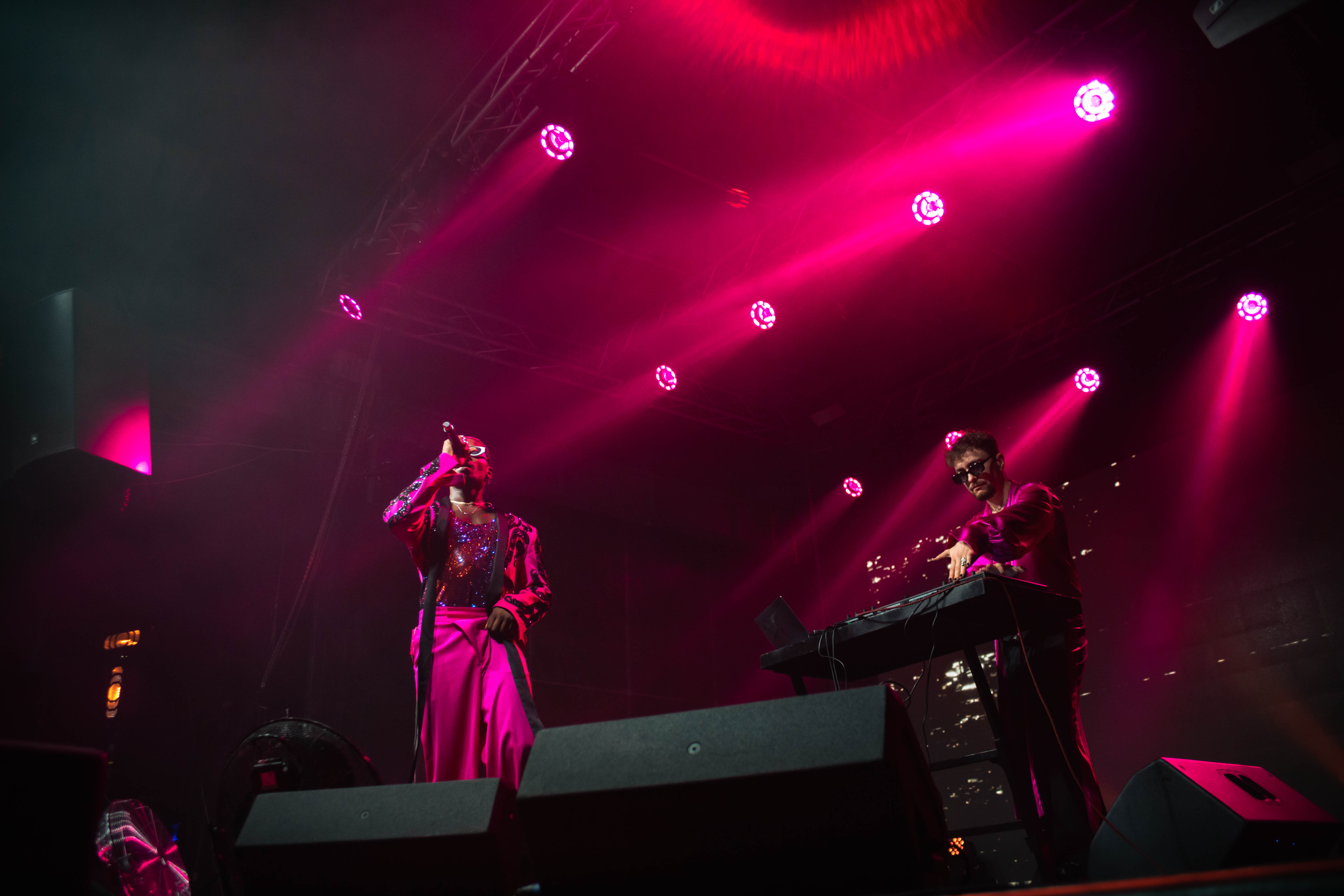
Tvorchi performing in Gdansk in 2022

"Heart of Steel" was written by Jeffery Augustus Kenny (real name Jimoh Augustus Kehinde) and composed by Andrii Hutsuliak, both members of Tvorchi. Hutsuliak and Kenny first met each other as university students in 2016 and formed Tvorchi two years later. The duo wrote "Heart of Steel" during the defense of Mariupol, specifically the Azovstal steel plant by Ukrainian soldiers in spring 2022. Online, they saw numerous videos of the defenders; the duo knew that the situation was bad, but Hutsuliak said he saw "strength, confidence, and that they were unbreakable like all of Ukrainians," inspiring them to write the song. The duo also said that the song warns about the dangers of nuclear warfare, stating in an interview that the duo alluded to the purpose of the Eurovision Song Contest's creation as one of the inspirations for the song, with Hutsuliak saying, "we looked into the past of this contest. [The Eurovision Song Contest] was created after the Second World War to unite Europe. Today, while some are playing with nuclear threats, our people with steel hearts are protecting all of Europe."

The song has a message of not giving up in the face of adversity, with a powerful beginning to symbolize the message. Kenny also said that the core messages of the song are strength, courage, and bravery. The song also meant an actual "heart of steel" that was worn down by trials and difficulties, with a "broken non-standard intoxicating rhythm" detailing the state of when you smile despite everything. In an interview with NPR, Hutsuliak said, "[We're] trying to say the Ukrainians will fight no matter what 'til the end, which is peace, [...] so we just want to show they have hearts of steel. They don't have, like, brittle spirits. No, they're very strong, mind and body." In the interview, Kenny said that the duo applied for Eurovision at the last minute and did not expect to win, choosing "Heart of Steel" because of the emotions they put into it. In December, ahead of the national selection, the duo started practicing and rewriting the song, choosing their outfits and choreography and hiring a team for the technical aspects.

== Release and promotion ==
The song was released along with other Vidbir 2022 songs on 17 November 2023, being one of the 10 shortlisted from nearly 400 entries. Directed by Ruslan Makhov, the official music video for the song presented a portal between reality and an afterlife, with the band saying that humanity chooses what awaits them in the future. The video symbolizes different things: strength of spirit, a new beginning, and a fatal end. In an interview with Ksenia Ivas of Suspilne, Hutsuliak said that "he [Ruslan Makhov] is a very talented person, and it was most important to us that he felt the song the way we created it [the music video]". The video also contained visuals of volcanoes and earthquakes to tell the "story of pain", according to Kenny. On 18 April, Tvorchi was set to perform unannounced at a Ukrainian rail station to promote a drive to buy incubators for premature babies run by United24, but air raid sirens due to a shelling postponed the show. The show eventually continued. "Heart of Steel" was revamped on 9 March for Eurovision. To further promote the song, Tvorchi participated in the Barcelona Eurovision Party on 25 March, Israel Calling on 3 April, and Eurovision in Concert on 15 April as the final act added to the lineup.

== Critical reception ==
Doron Lahav of ESC Beat ranked the song 20th out of the 37 entries in Eurovision 2023, stating that the production was "too rich" and that, although their voices combine in the studio version, it would be hard to do in the live performance; Lahav added that, with a song like this, the live performance needs to be "sharp and convincing." A ranking containing reviews from three BuzzFeed editors ranked the song 15th overall, earning a total of 20 out of a possible 30 points; the editors commented that the song was "refreshing" and could easily enter global pop stations but was hard to describe. The song was ranked 21st by Vulture's Jon O'Brien, describing the entry as "unlikely" to follow the path of Ukraine's previous winners, adding that the song is likely to garner a strong sympathy vote despite it not being "particularly stirring." National Public Radio's Glen Weldon gave "Heart of Steel" an honorable mention in his top ten, stating that the previous win "cast a long shadow, one that this year's entry, a much more conventional, contemporary Eurovision song, never quite crawls out from under," but added that the song contained "nice harmonies and a defiant message" and could do well in the grand final.

The Guardian's Ben Beaumont–Thomas included the song in his "14 songs to listen out for at Eurovision 2023" list, stating that with the "funkily bumping Flume-esque beat" and the "themes of stubborn resolve and self-definition," the cheers "will also be deafening" when the duo begin their performance. Patrick Freyne of The Irish Times described the song as "cyborg-themed industrial pop." Yulia Sanina, a jury member from Vidbir, said that she liked new Ukrainian music and genres and stated that the beginning is phenomenal, but the chorus was missing something. Harrison Brocklehurst of The Tab ranked "Heart of Steel" 6th out of all Eurovision 2023 songs, describing it as "Ukraine’s party in Liverpool’s house" with a "breezy, The Weeknd-esque coolness" that made it sound new and modern.

== Eurovision Song Contest ==
=== Vidbir 2023 ===
Vidbir 2023 was the seventh edition of Vidbir, the competition that determines the Ukrainian entry for the Eurovision Song Contest. The competition took place in the Maidan Nezalezhnosti metro station in Kyiv and consisted of a final on 17 December 2022. There were 384 entries from 299 artists that were received by Suspilne. Of these, 36 acts were longlisted and announced on October 27. On November 17, ten entries were selected to compete in the competition. The national final was held in December 2022, featuring the acts in the shortlist. The winner was selected through the combination of votes from a public televote and an expert jury. Ties would be decided in favor of the entries that received higher scores from the public televote. After passing the initial selection phase, Tvorchi were confirmed among the 10 finalists of the competition with the song "Heart of Steel" on 17 November. At Vidbir, the song performed last out of the ten competing songs. Both members were dressed in costumes similar to hazmat suits, with Hutsuliak wearing a black suit and Kenny wearing a yellow suit. A video screen behind them showed the dangers of nuclear warfare, and two background dancers also appeared, both wearing gas masks. Eventually, the combined vote of the public and jury crowned it the winner and national representative on the Eurovision stage in Liverpool, gaining 19 points.

=== At Eurovision ===
According to Eurovision rules, all nations with the exceptions of the host country and the "Big Five" (France, Germany, Italy, Spain, and the United Kingdom) are required to qualify from one of two semi-finals in order to compete for the final: the top ten countries from each semi-final progress to the final. As the winning country of the 2022 contest, Ukraine automatically qualified for the final. Tvorchi performed 19th in the running order, ahead of Moldova's "Soarele și luna" by Pasha Parfeni and behind Norway's "Queen of Kings" by Alessandra Mele.

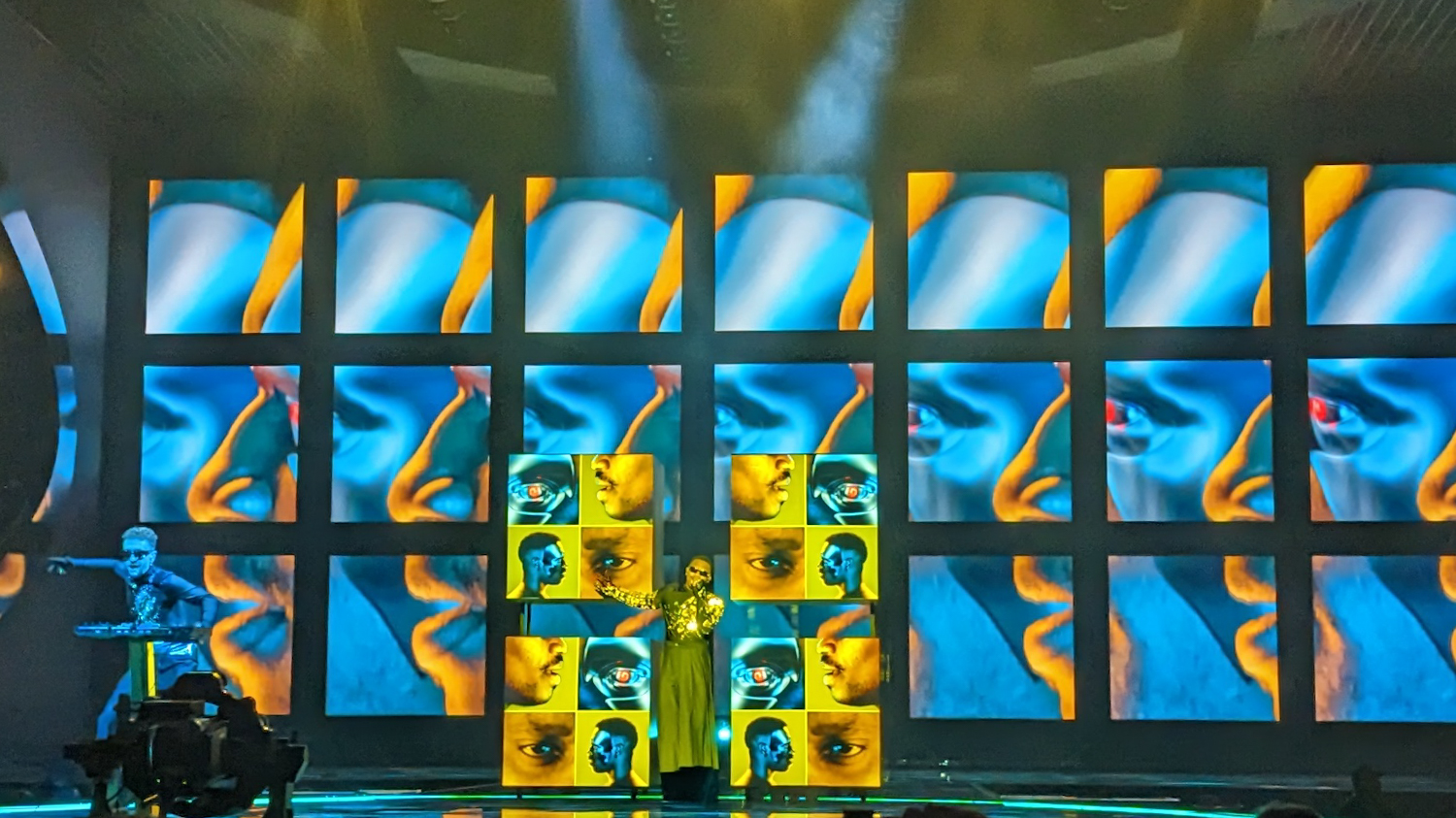
The duo performing "Heart of Steel" at a Eurovision 2023 jury final.

For its Eurovision performance, Iryna Dyachuk and Oleh Bodnarchuk were appointed as staging directors. The costumes of the duo were designed by Ukrainian designer Ivan Frolov; Kenny wore a black, golf-style base and wide pants adorned with a gold heart on his chest, and Hutsuliak wore the same costume with a silver heart. Frolov stated that the costumes symbolized a "continuation" of the performance in the national final. Two backing dancers were appointed to accompany the duo on stage. According to reports, over 3 million UAH was spent for the delegation and its performance. The dark staging contained the colors of the Ukrainian flag, according to Anthony Granger of Eurovoix and Doron Lahav of ESC Beat. The LED screens present the message of the song as four three-dimensional boxes showcase different visuals, like the lead singer’s face and a broken orange sun.

The performance received mixed reactions from the Ukrainian public, with some reacting positively to the performance, while others stating that the performance in the national selection was better and that the vocals were bad. Comments from international viewers supported the performance more. Louis Staples of the Rolling Stone said that Tvorchi's performance reminded him of a "real conflict" after the previous performances. Costa Christou of ESCXtra described Kenny's vocals as consistent, but expected a low jury score due to the nature and tempo of the song, adding that Ukraine carried the expectation of gaining a high televote score. Christou said that the staging was still one of the most professional in the second half. The official Eurovision live blog described the performance as having impactful lighting and graphics, adding that the staging is "clever" and obvious that it was polished heavily. The blog said that, with the orchestral music composition and the staging, the performance was "hypnotic" and a continuation of Ukraine's title.

After the results were announced, Tvorchi finished in 6th with 243 points, with a split score of 54 from the jury and 189 from the audience. Regarding the juries, Czechia gave Ukraine 12 points. In the televote, Poland, Portugal, Moldova, and Czechia gave Ukraine 12 points. In a short video released after the final, the duo thanked fans for their support, stating "have a heart of steel, our strength is in unity! Glory to Ukraine! Glory to the heroes." In another Instagram post, they said "yesterday was an unforgettable performance. We put all our energy and will into it," adding that the fourth place in the televote symbolized unity, thanking viewers for voting for them.

== Charts ==
=== Weekly charts ===
Weekly chart performance for "Heart of Steel"
Chart (2023)	Peak position
Finland (Suomen virallinen lista)	37
Greece International (IFPI)	84
Iceland (Tónlistinn)	10
Lithuania (AGATA)	12
Poland (Polish Streaming Top 100)	97
Sweden (Sverigetopplistan)	65
Ukraine Airplay (TopHit)	7
UK Singles (Official Charts)	95
UK Indie (Official Charts)	32

=== Monthly charts ===
Monthly chart performance for "Heart of Steel"
Chart (2023)	Peak position
Ukraine Airplay (TopHit)	15

=== Year-end charts ===
Year-end chart performance for "Heart of Steel"
Chart (2023)	Position
Ukraine Airplay (TopHit)	67

== Release history ==
Release history and format for "Heart of Steel"
Country	Date	Format(s)	Label	Ref.
Various	23 December 2022	Digital download; streaming	Tvorchi / Best Music	
