= Andriy Kuzmenko =

Ukrainian musical artist (1968–2015)

Hero of Ukraine Andriy Kuzmenko Андрій Кузьменко
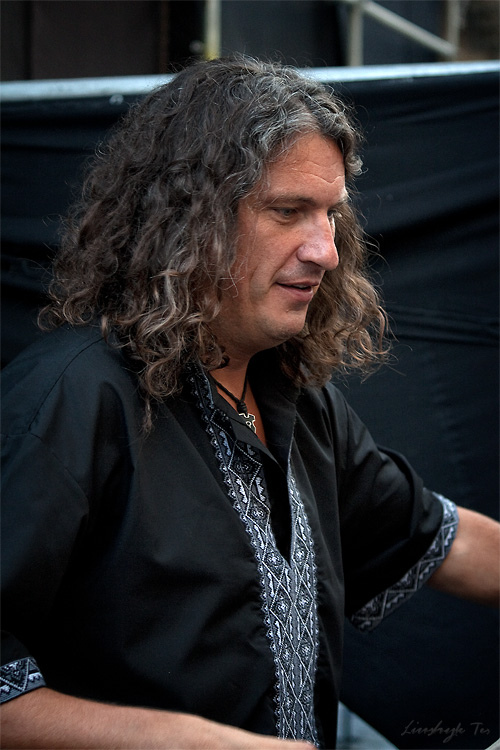
- Kuzmenko in August 2011

Background information
- Also known as: Kuzma Skryabin
- Born: 17 August 1968; Sambir, Lviv Oblast, Ukrainian SSR, Soviet Union
- Died: 2 February 2015 (aged 46) Lozuvatka, Dnipropetrovsk Oblast, Ukraine
- Genres: Rock, electronic
- Occupations: Singer, musician, songwriter, poet, writer, presenter, producer, actor, radio host
- Instruments: Vocals, keyboards, guitar
- Years active: 1983–2015
- Labels: Studiya Leva, Caravan CD, Nova, NAC, Boom, Atlantik, Real, Lavina, Moon
- Formerly of: Skryabin, Yulia Lord, Natalia Mogilevskaya, Payushchie Trusy, Plach Yeremiyi, Iryna Bilyk, Druha Rika, Dazzle Dreams

Andriy Viktorovych "Kuzma" Kuzmenko (Ukrainian: Андрій Вікторович Кузьменко; 17 August 1968 – 2 February 2015) was a Ukrainian singer, poet, writer, TV presenter, producer and actor. He was best known as the lead singer of the Ukrainian rock band Skryabin, founded in 1989.

Kuzmenko died in a traffic collision on 2nd of February 2015 in Lozuvatka, Dnipropetrovsk Oblast, aged 46. He was post-humously named Hero of Ukraine in 2020.

== Biography ==
Andriy Kuzmenko was born on 17 August 1968, in Sambir, Lviv region. His family moved to the city of Novoyavorivsk, where he would start his career. As a child, he dreamed of becoming a garbage truck driver. His mother was a music teacher, while his father was an engineer. Kuzmenko, an only child, graduated from music school and from the Faculty of Dentistry. He was not interested in dentistry, but finished his studies at the request of the parents. He was also actively involved in sports and participated in biathlons. On 14 September 1997, Kuzmenko and his wife Svitlana had a daughter, who was given the name Maria Barbara, in honor of the Polish actress Barbara Brylska, a childhood idol of Kuzmenko. According to him, his wife resembles Brylska.

=== 2000s ===
Kuzmenko's life heavily revolved around Skryabin during this period. In 2000, he became a presenter of his own hit parade "Hot Seven", which lasted until 2002. Beginning around 2003, Kuzmenko worked as a presenter of the programs "Chance" and "Shikanemo" with singer Natalia Mogilevska. He was given all control of management over Skryabin, and began to take the band in a sonically new direction. In 2006, Kuzmenko published his autobiography, titled "Me, Pobeda and Berlin". The book was wildly popular, and has been reprinted several times since then. In 2009, he created the group Payushchie Trusy (Singing Pants), and helped the project "DZIDZIO" grow in popularity. In the same year he was a voting member for the "Book of the Year B-B-C" award.

=== 2010s ===
At the end of January 2014, Kuzmenko recorded a song dedicated to the events of Euromaidan, stating that he supports the people on the Maidan, but not the opposition. During the 2014 war, he helped the military and the wounded in the area of ATO in eastern Ukraine. In October 2014, he launched his own Internet radio station called «S.R.A.K.A.», which, according to him, played the music he listened to in the car. Shortly before his death, Kuzmenko strongly criticized the current government in interviews, wishing death upon government officials and accusing them of corruption.

=== Death ===
On 2 February 2015, at around 8:20, Kuzmenko died in a car accident near Lozuvatka village in Kryvyi Rih Raion in Dnipropetrovsk Oblast. The press service of the Department of State Automobile Inspection of the Ministry of Internal Affairs of Ukraine reported that, according to the preliminary data, the Toyota Sequoia SUV driven by Kuzmenko collided with a GAZ-53 on the 86th km of highway "Kryvyi Rih – Kropyvnytskyi". The injuries Kuzmenko received in the collision were fatal. He was returning from Kryvyi Rih, where his band had performed the day before. The vehicle's passenger was taken to a hospital in Kryvyi Rih.

== Legacy ==
Asteroid 291923 Kuzmaskryabin, discovered at the Andrushivka Astronomical Observatory in 2006 was named in his memory. The official naming citation was published by the Minor Planet Center on 23 March 2016 (MPC 99355).

== Filmography ==
=== Actor ===
- Evenings in khutir near Dykanka (2001) — Kuzma, a friend of Vakula (indicated in cast list as Andriy Kuzmenko).
- Lesya+Roma (2006) — as himself (cameo)
- Carnival night at Inter (2006) — as himself
- Very New Year Cinema (2007) — guest at the New Year Holiday in museum (cameo)
- Little Red Riding Hood (2009) — Blue Beard

== Gallery ==
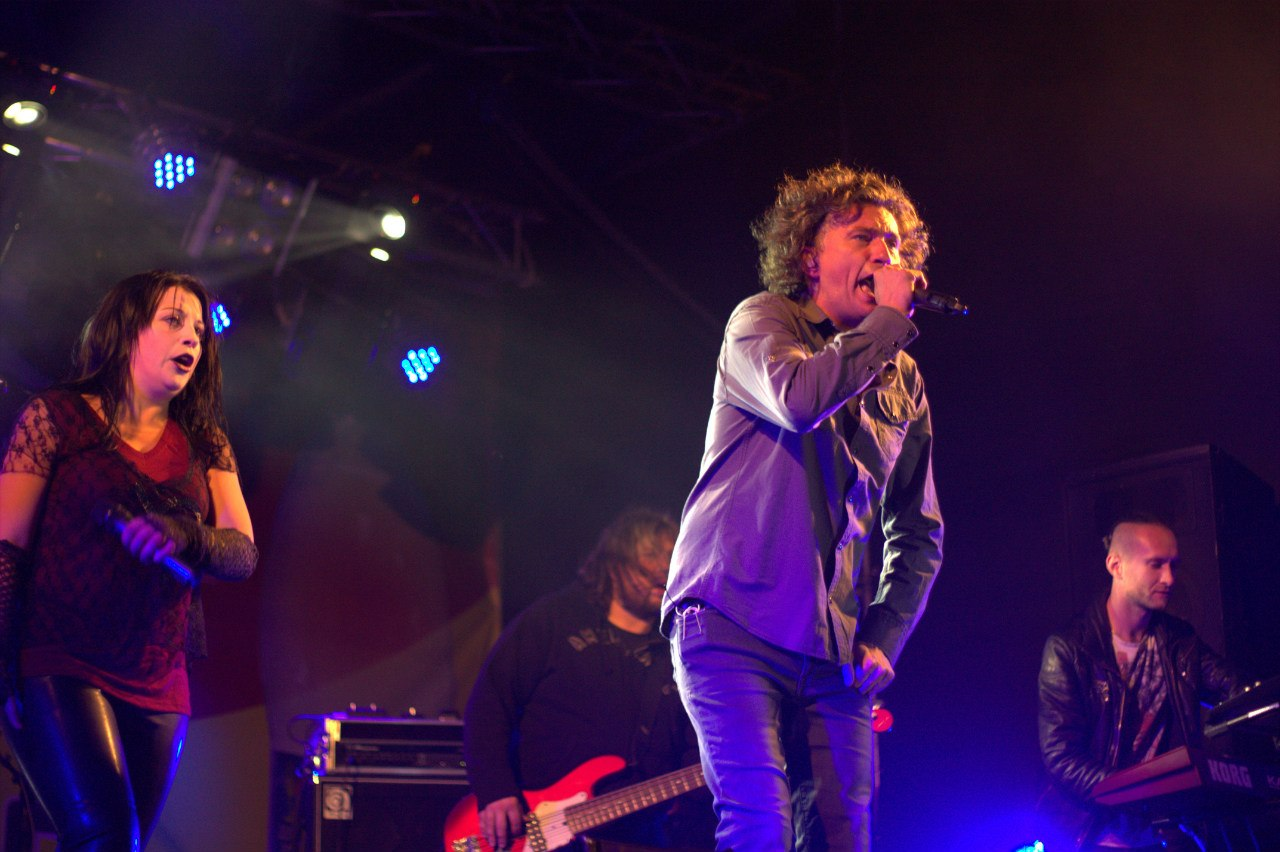
Scriabin concert in Melitopol 2014

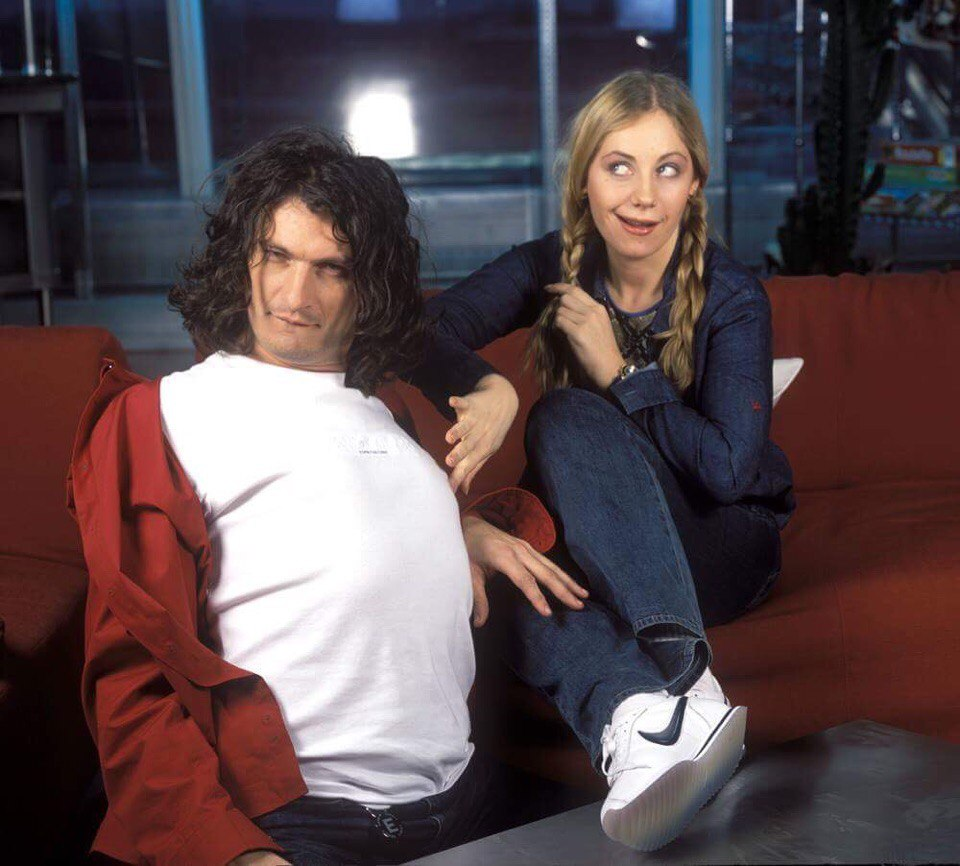
With Slava Frolova in 2003

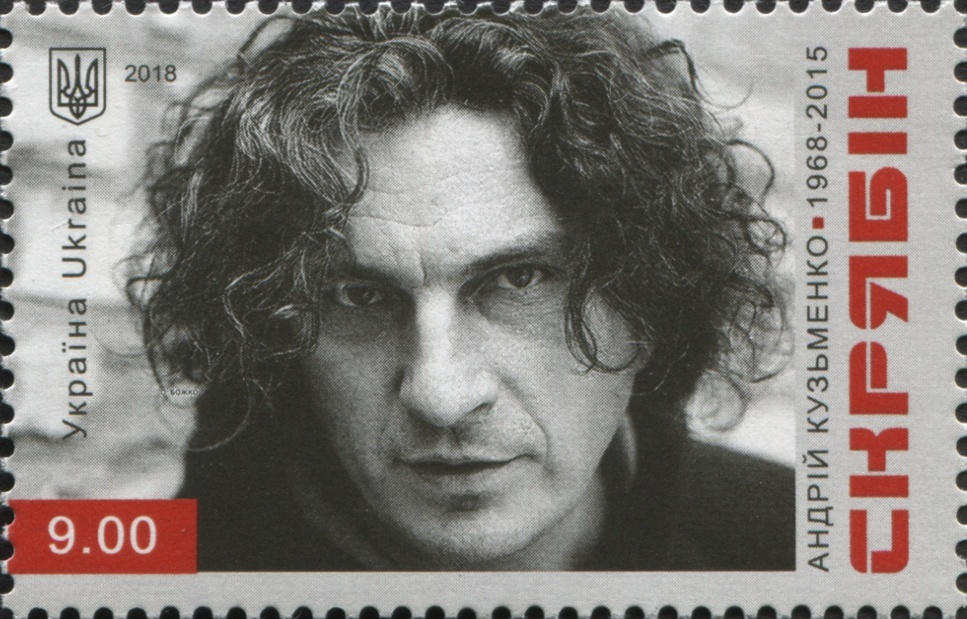
Ukrainian postal stamp, 2018
