= Tvorchi =

Ukrainian electronic music duo

TVORCHI
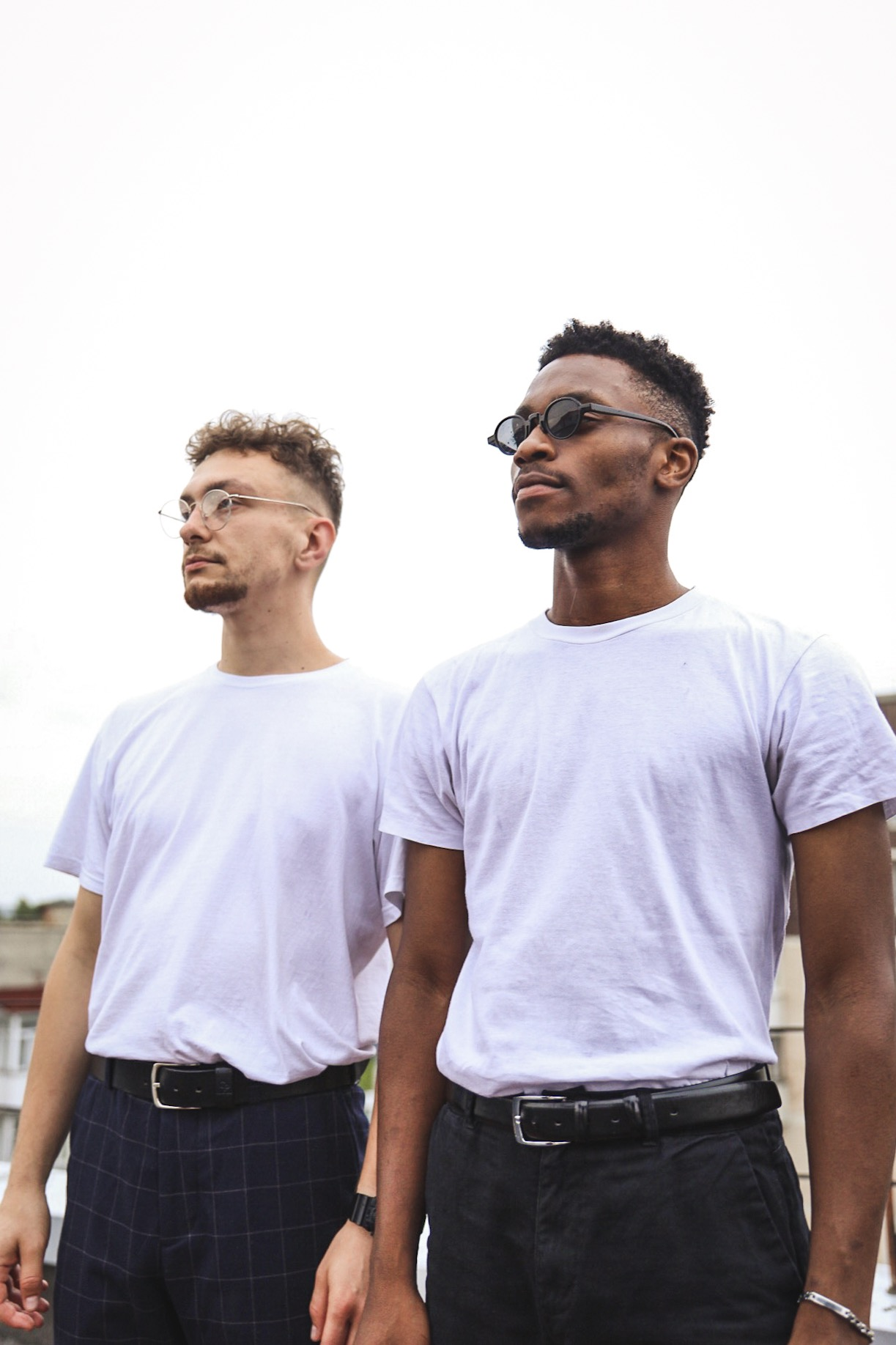
- Hutsuliak and Kenny in 2019

Background information
- Origin: Ternopil, Ukraine
- Genres: Electronic
- Years active: 2017–present
- Members: Andrii Hutsuliak; Jeffery Kenny

Tvorchi (stylised in all caps; from Ukrainian: твóрчі, romanized: tvórchi, lit. 'creatives') is a Ukrainian electronic music duo from Ternopil, formed in 2018 by producer Andrii Hutsuliak and vocalist Jeffery Kenny. They have released five studio albums: The Parts (2018), Disco Lights (2019), 13 Waves (2020), Road (2020), and Planet X (2024).

They represented Ukraine in the Eurovision Song Contest 2023 with the song "Heart of Steel", placing sixth in the final with 243 points. They are also the winners of the YUNA Awards in 2021 and 2022.

== History ==
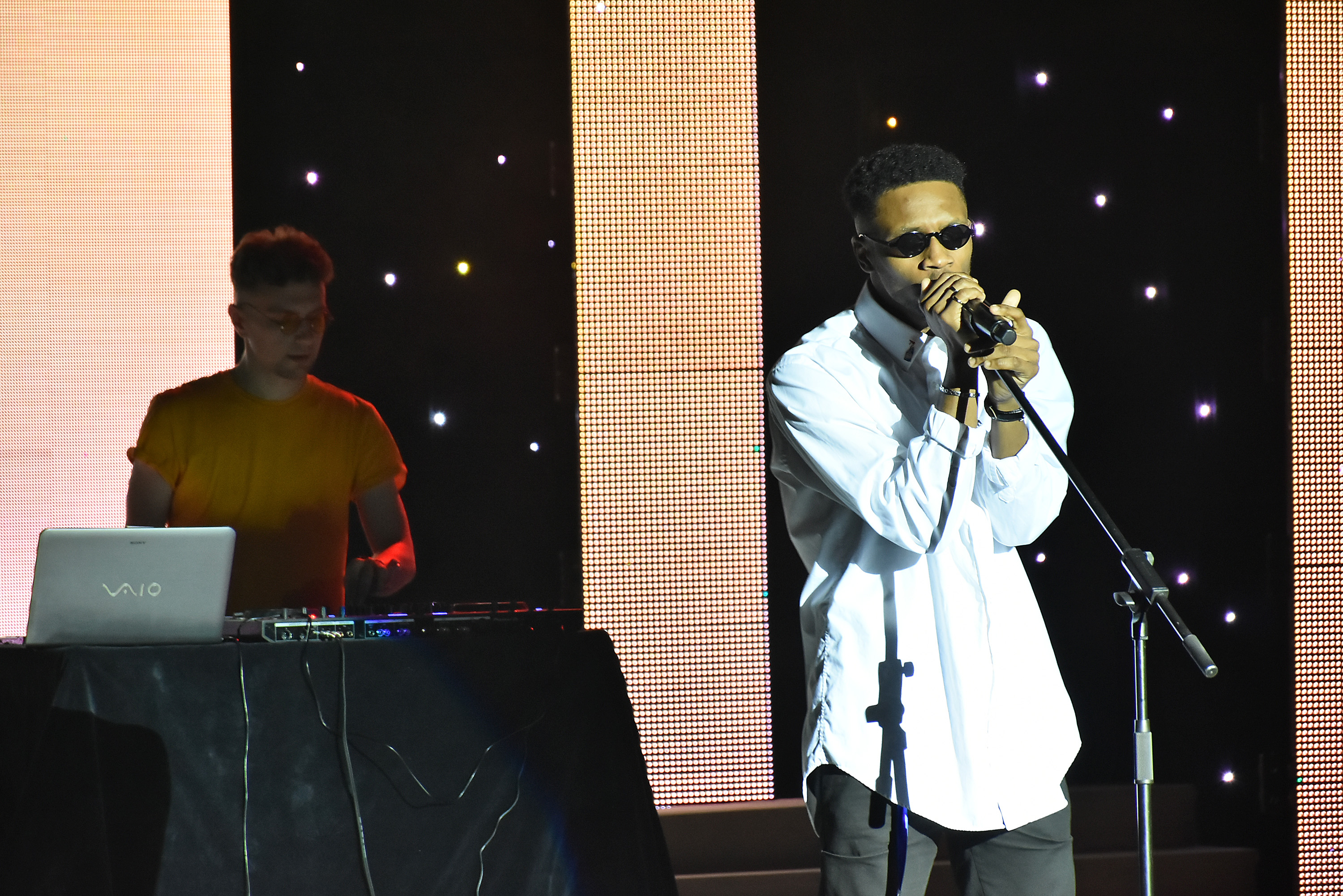
Tvorchi in 2019

Andrii Viktorovych Hutsuliak (Ukrainian: Андрій Вікторович Гуцуляк; born 21 February 1996 in Vilkhovets, Chortkiv Raion) and Jimoh Augustus Kehinde (alias Jeffery Kenny; born 30 September 1997 in Nigeria) met while they were students at the Faculty of Pharmacy of Ternopil National Medical University. On 30 May 2017, the duo released their first single, "Slow". On 4 September, their second single "You" was released.

On 2 February 2018, Tvorchi released their debut album, The Parts. On 20 September 2018, the duo released a video for the song "Molodist". On 14 February 2019, the second album named Disco Lights was released. On 21 February, the duo released a video for the song "Believe". According to the duo, the shooting budget was $100. Within a few days, the video garnered 400,000 views on YouTube, and the song ranked 9th in Google Play charts in Ukraine.

In the summer of that year, the duo performed at the music festivals Faine Misto (Ternopil), Atlas Weekend (Kyiv) and Ukrainian Song Project (Lviv). On 9 September, the duo released the single "Ne tantsiuiu". In February 2020, Tvorchi entered Vidbir with the song "Bonfire", placing fourth in the final.

The music video for the song "Mova tila" from the second studio album Disco Lights premiered on 7 May on the duo's YouTube channel and on the M1 television show Premier. The video, directed by Andrii Lahutin, was shot in the fall of 2019 in Kyiv. On 25 September 2020, the music video for the lead single from the album 13 Waves, "Living My Life", was released.

In September 2020, Tvorchi released their third album, 13 Waves, which was recorded remotely because of the COVID-19 pandemic. The album was played more than two million times on music platforms within the first week of its release. The album "13 Waves" contains 13 songs, including a collaboration song called "Yellow Sand" with Ukrainian singer Alina Pash. On 19 December 2020, the duo won the online music award "Culture Ukraine" in two categories: 'Best New Artist', and 'Best English-language single' for "Bonfire". The duo was also nominated for the YUNA 2021 Music Awards in four categories, including 'Album of the Year'.

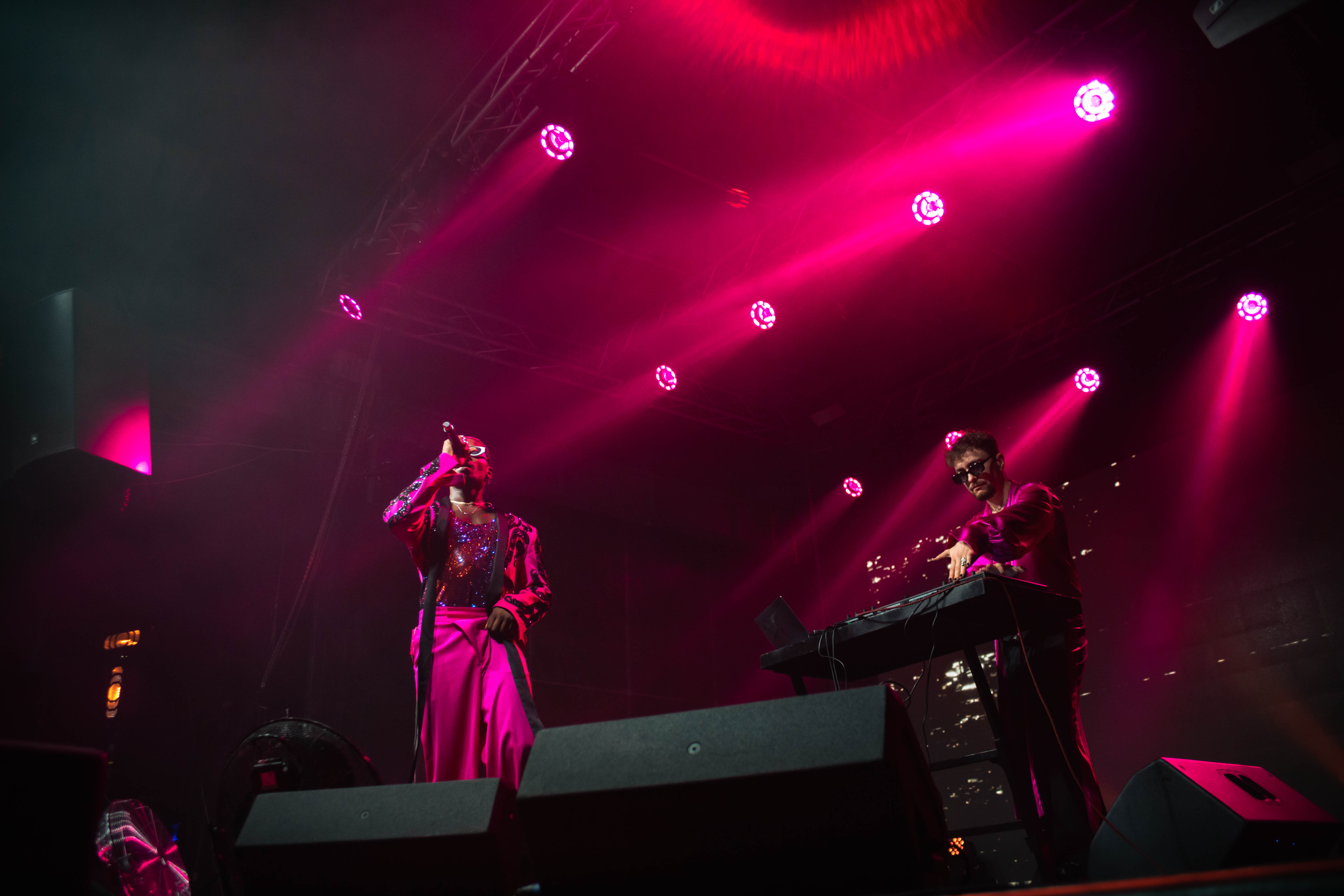
Tvorchi performing in Gdańsk, Poland in 2022

In December 2022, they entered Vidbir 2023 and won the competition with the song "Heart of Steel", coming second in the jury vote and first in the public vote, and thus earned the right to represent Ukraine in the Eurovision Song Contest 2023.

Ten minutes before the duo performed at Eurovision, their hometown of Ternopil was hit by a barrage of Russian missiles, injuring two people and damaging warehouses in the city. During the voting window, the group held up a makeshift sign with 'Ternopil' written on it.

Between late April and early June 2023, the duo raised 11,924,114 UAH for incubators in Ukraine, hoping to help the influx of premature babies in Ukraine, as part of their "Saving the Hearts of Children" fundraiser.

== Discography ==
=== Studio albums ===
- The Parts (2018)
- Disco Lights (2019)
- 13 Waves (2020)
- Road (2021)
- Planet X (2024)

=== Singles ===
- «Slow» (2017)
- «You» (2017)
- «#не_танцюю» (2019)
- «Bonfire» (2020)
- «Мова тіла» (2020)
- «Living My Life» (2020)
- «Like It Like That» (2020)
- «Віч-на-віч» (2021)
- «Falling» (2021)
- «Heart of Steel» (2022)
- «Мрійники» (with The Hardkiss) (2023)
- «I Can't Stop» (2023)
- «Разом» (2023)
- «Два озера повні сліз» (2024)
- «Каланхоe» (with Pozdniakov) (2024)
- «Мила моя» (2025)
- «Надія» (2025)
- «Одіссея» (with The Maneken) (2025)
- «Буває» (2025)

=== Charted singles ===
List of charted singles, with selected chart positions
Title	Year	Peak chart positions			
Title	Year	FIN	LTU	SWE	UK
"Heart of Steel"	2022	37	12	65	95

=== Music videos ===
Song title	Year	Album	Director
"Molodist"	2018	The Parts	Morris Ternevich
"Believe"	2019	Disco Lights	Andrii Obolonchyk
"Ne tantsiuiu"	2019	Non-album singles	Kyrylo Sulyha
"Bonfire"	2020	Non-album singles	Maksym Hetman
"Mova tila"	2020	Disco Lights	Andrii Lahutin
"Living My Life"	2020	13 Waves	Dmytro Dorosh
"Vich-na-vich"	2021	Non-album single	Kyrylo Sulyha
"Falling"	2021	Road	Andrii Lahutin
"Boremosia"	2022	Non-album singles	Oleksiy Bondar
"Heart of Steel"	2022	Non-album singles	Ruslan Makhov

Awards and achievements
Preceded by Kalush Orchestra with "Stefania"	Ukraine in the Eurovision Song Contest; 2023	Succeeded by Alyona Alyona and Jerry Heil with "Teresa & Maria"
