= Sappho (2008 film) =

Sappho (also known as Summer Lover) is a 2008 American movie directed by Robert Crombie and starring Avalon Barrie as the title character.

== Plot ==
Sappho Lovell, a newly wed American wife, visits the Greek island Lesbos with her husband, and there learns about the original Greek poetess Sappho and experiences sexual love to a young Russian woman, very much like the namesake poet in ancient times. She also tries to introduce her husband into the culture of sexual behaviour not regulated by accepted norms.

== Cast ==
- Avalon Barrie as Sappho Lovell
- Todd Soley as Phil Lovell
- Lyudmila Shiryaeva as Helene Orlov
