= Zetetics (band) =

Ukrainian rock band

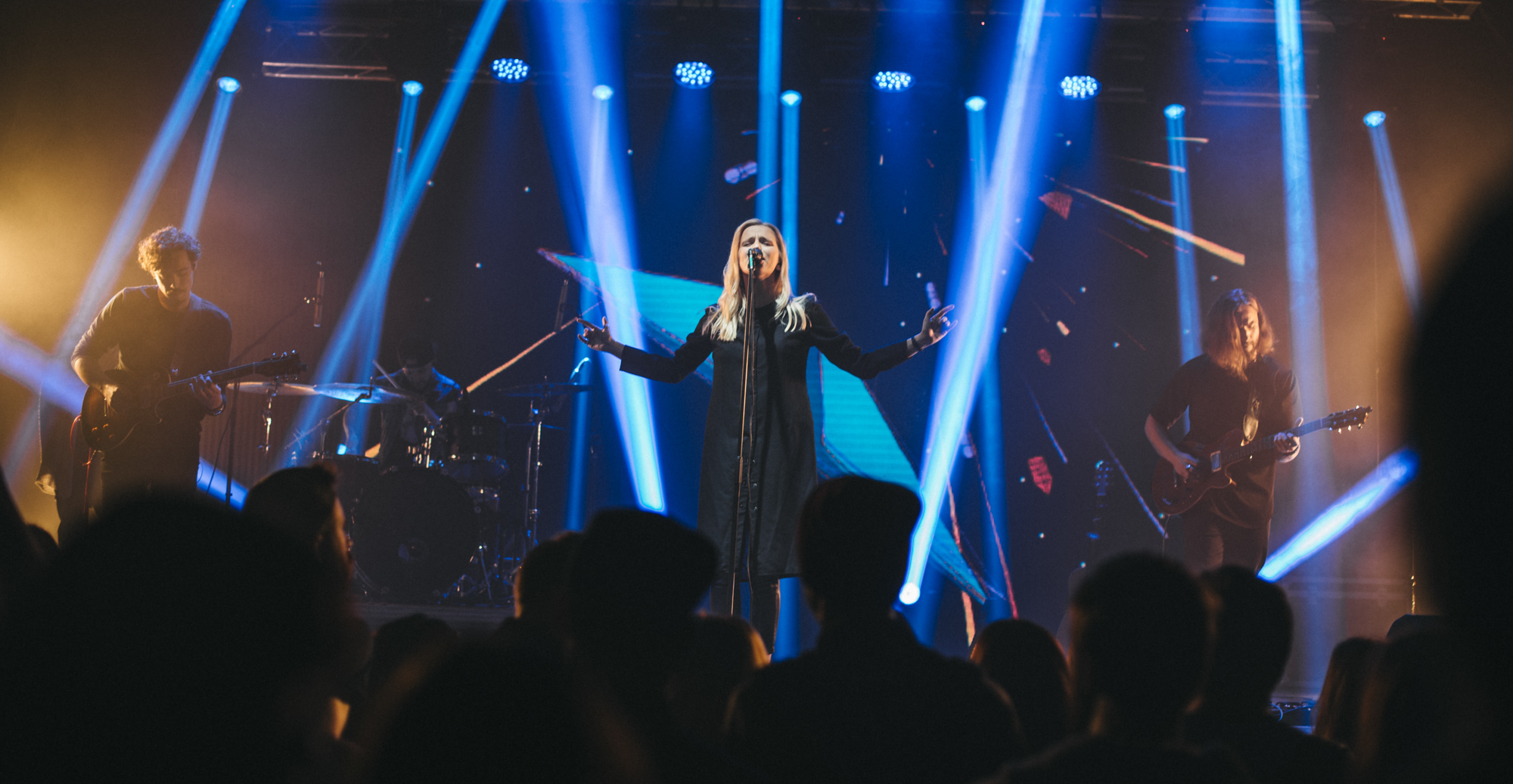

Background information
- Also known as: Zetetics
- Origin: Kyiv, Ukraine
- Genres: Alternative, Rock, Pop-rock
- Years active: 2015 – present
- Labels: Independent
- Members: Lika Bugaeva; Stanislav Lypetskyi; Igor Odaryuk; Sasha Soloha
- Website: zetetics.band

Zetetics are a Ukrainian alternative music project formed in 2014 by lead singer Lika Bugaeva. Zetetics is influenced from 90s alternative and experimental rock and electronic music.

== History ==
Lika Bugaeva first became known as a contestant on the talent TV show "The Voice". The band's debut album, "Finally I see", was rated the best Ukrainian album of 2015, by 'Inspired'. Their single "Fly Away" is well known for its video, in which Lika was singing in sign language.

In autumn 2015, the band released a new album "Zetetic". "Zetetic" is a little used English word from Greek and Latin, that translates as "those who are looking for the truth". The album was praised by Comma.com.ua and BeeHype.

The band has released its first full concert video — Live in Kyiv.

In winter 2017, the band released "Rooftop Live" — a music film about the band.

In September 2019 Zetetics released their third studio album, titled 11:11. Logline of the album is about self-knowledge and the purity of self-talk. Each song has an undertone of mystical realism.

The band composed and performed the music for the film Nightmare Director also known as School Number 5, which was released in October 2019.

In June 2020, Zetetics, led by Anzhelika, took part in the official selection of the country's cultural diplomacy — the Music Catalogue of the Ukrainian Institute, which is the official cultural representation of Ukraine. The mission of the institute is to popularize Ukrainian cultural products and artists in the world.

On November 24, 2021, the band presented their fourth studio album Cold Star with AWAL label.

In February 2022 the band postponed their planned tour due to the Russian invasion of Ukraine.

In April 2022 the band returned to concert shows for a charity to Ukraine.

In May 2023, Zetetics performed at the Xpresia Festival in Liverpool as part of the Eurovision Culture Village, marking the band's first UK performance. The performance at the Invisible Wind Factory featured songs from the album Cold Star performed live for the first time.

== Discography ==
=== Albums ===
- 2014 — Finally I see
- 2015 — Zetetic
- 2016 — Unplugged
- 2019 — 11:11
- 2021 — Cold Star

=== Singles ===
- 2017 — Even Tonight
- 2018 — I Have Nothing
- 2018 — Homeless
- 2019 — Round And Round
- 2019 — Burning
- 2019 — Stop Me
- 2020 — Salt
- 2020 — Lotus

== Live shows ==
- Live in Kyiv
- Unplugged
- Rooftop Live

== Music videos ==
- Fly Away
- Dance With Me
- You and I
- Get You Up
- Even Tonight
- Lotus
