= Payushchie Trusy =

Ukraine music pop-group

- Origin: Kyiv, Ukraine
- Genres: Pop, rock, pop rock, urban
- Years active: 2008–present
- Labels: Moon Records
- Members: Olha Lizgunova (former); Iryna Skrinnyk; Olena Slyusarenko
- Website: Official Website

Payushchie Trusy (Ukrainian: Пающіє труси/Pajuqiě trusy; lit. Singing Pants, Russian: Поющие трусы/Pojuqiě trusy, lit. Singing pants) is a Ukrainian girl group. The band was formed by Ukrainian music producer Andriy Kuzmenko (more known as Kuzma) in 2008, and consists of Iryna Skrinnyk and Olena Slysarenko. Payushchie Trusy came to international attention after taking part in New Wave Festival in July 2010 with the song "Plastic Surgeon", for which they received a Special Prize. Media describes the band as a "sensation in the world of show business, glamour and fashion", while the members themselves describe their music as a "caustic parody at the contemporary pop music".

The name of the band is a corruption of Russian: поющие трусы (the actual Ukrainian term would be "співаючі труси"). The Russian term "singing panties" is a popular sarcastic reference to the proliferating scantily-clad girl groups with poor vocal abilities and undemanding lyrics in late Soviet and the subsequent post-Soviet pop music scene.

== Band members ==
| Full Name | Ukrainian Name | Nickname | Translation |
|---|---|---|---|
| Olha Lizgunova (former) | Ольга Лізґунова | Шпрот | Sprat |
| Iryna Skrinnyk | Ірина Скрінник | Рижова | |
| Olena Slyusarenko | Олена Слюсаренко | Сова | Owl |

== Discography ==
=== Album ===
- 2009 — Popsa

=== Singles ===
| Year | Title | Translation | Album | Notes |
|---|---|---|---|---|
| 2009 | "Поющие трусы/Pojuqiě trusu" | Singing Panties | Popsa | Featuring Skryabin |
| 2009 | "Тазик оливье/Tazik olivjě" | A bowl of Olivye (Eastern European salad) | Popsa | |
| 2010 | "Пластический хирург/Plastičeskij hirurg" | Plastic Surgeon | Popsa | New Wave Festival entry Won — New Wave Festival Special Prize |
| 2010 | "Как Алла/Kak Alla" | Like Alla | Non–album single | |

== Awards and nominations ==
| Year | Award | Category | Work | Result |
|---|---|---|---|---|
| 2010 | New Wave Festival | Special Prize | "Пластический хирург" | Won |
