= Dazzle Dreams =

- Origin: Kyiv, Ukraine
- Genres: Synthpop, Disco
- Years active: 2006-2013
- Label: Moon Records
- Members: Dmytro Tsyperdyuk; Serhiy Hera (Shura); Greg Ihnatovych
- Website: Dazzle Dreams

Dazzle Dreams is a Ukrainian electronic band formed in 2006 in Kyiv. Dazzle Dreams released four studio albums.

== Members ==
- Dmytro Tsyperdyuk (singing)
- Serhiy Hera (Shura) (keyboards)
- Greg Ihnatovych (arrangement)

== Discography ==
- 2007 — Dazzle Dreams
- 2008 — D.Dreams Sound System-Nepal
- 2009 — (Go! Go! Go!) Disco killers
- 2012 — Diva

== Links ==
- Official page
