= Dzidzio =

Ukrainian band

DZIDZIO
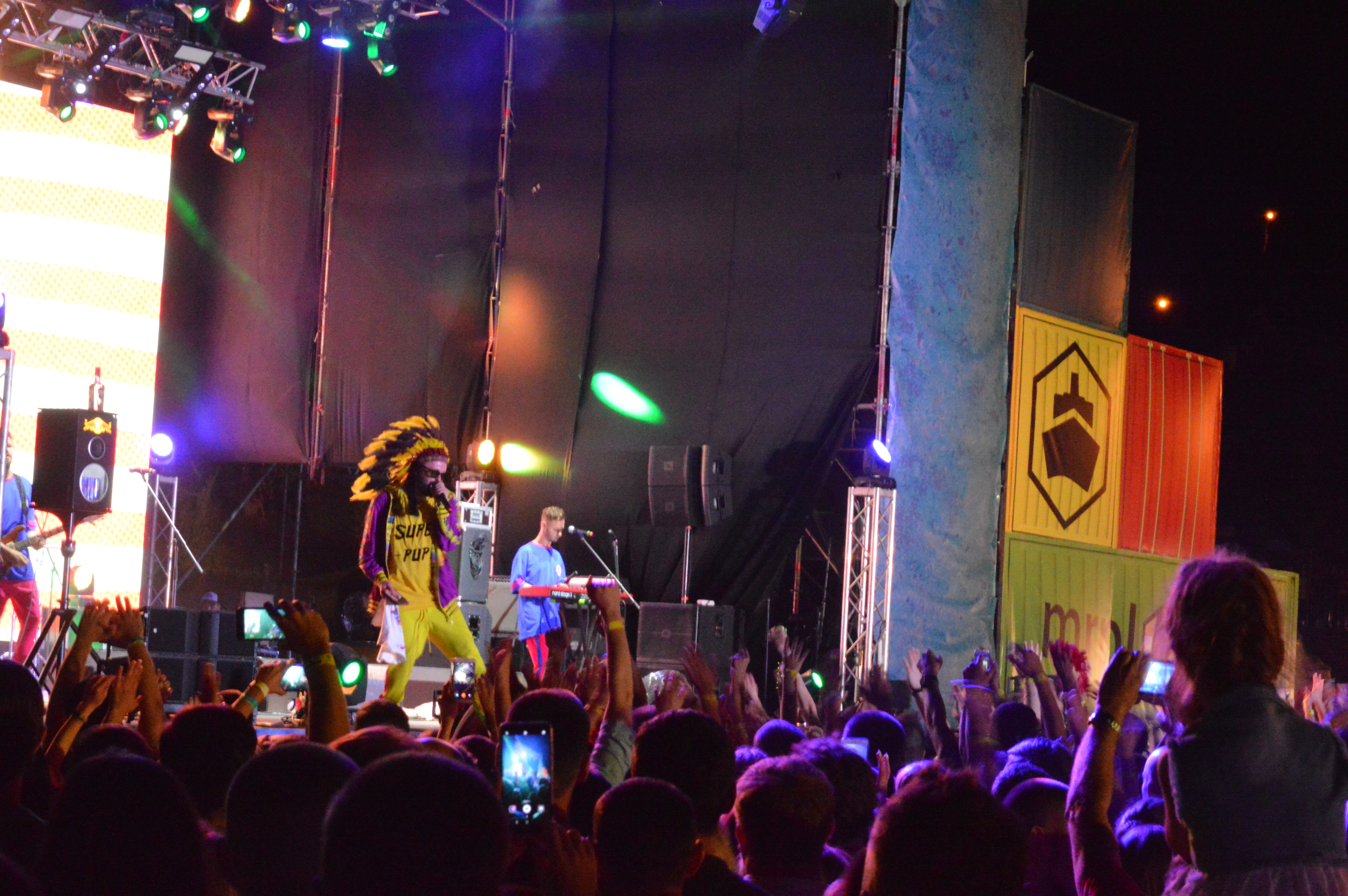
- DZIDZIO performing in 2018

Background information
- Origin: Novoiavorivsk, Lviv Oblast, Ukraine
- Genres: Pop
- Years active: 2009–present
- Members: Dzidzio (Mykhailo Khoma) L'amour (Orest Halitskyi); Agrus (Volodymyr Huliak) Rumbambar (Serhiy Huliak)
- Past members: Lesyk (Oleh Turko); Julik (Nazar Huk)
- Website: dzidzio.com/en/

DZIDZIO (Ukrainian: ДЗІДЗЬО) is a Ukrainian band with a comedic bent to their music.

This band was founded on 9 September 2009 in Novoiavorivsk, Lviv Oblast. It gained its popularity on the internet in part due to their "fourth member", a pig named Meison, with his snout serving as the band logo.

The band released two albums, ХА-ХА-ХА (Ha Ha Ha) in 2012, and DZIDZIO Хіти (DZIDZIO Hits) in 2014.

DZIDZIO performed benefit concerts in support of the Euromaidan movement.

The band appeared at the end of the first episode of the first season of the TV series Servant of the People and performed Sama-sama.

In March 2016, Lesyk (Oleh Turko), one of the band's founders, left the band due to a scandal. According to Dzidzio (Mykhailo Khoma), Lesyk did not agree with the band's move to Kyiv, so he wanted to sell his share of property rights for UAH 5.2 million, which the other members refused to buy. As a result, Lesyk demonstratively presented his share in the band to Andriy Kuzmenko's mother at a UNIAN press conference, and guitarist Orest Halytskyi, known as Lyamur (Yulyk's godfather), joined the band. According to Muzvar, the case of the band's breakup and the conflict between the members was included in the TOP-5 most famous cases of breakdowns in the Ukrainian music industry.

Since 2017, the band has consisted of four musicians - Dzidzio, L'amour, Agrus and Rumbambar.

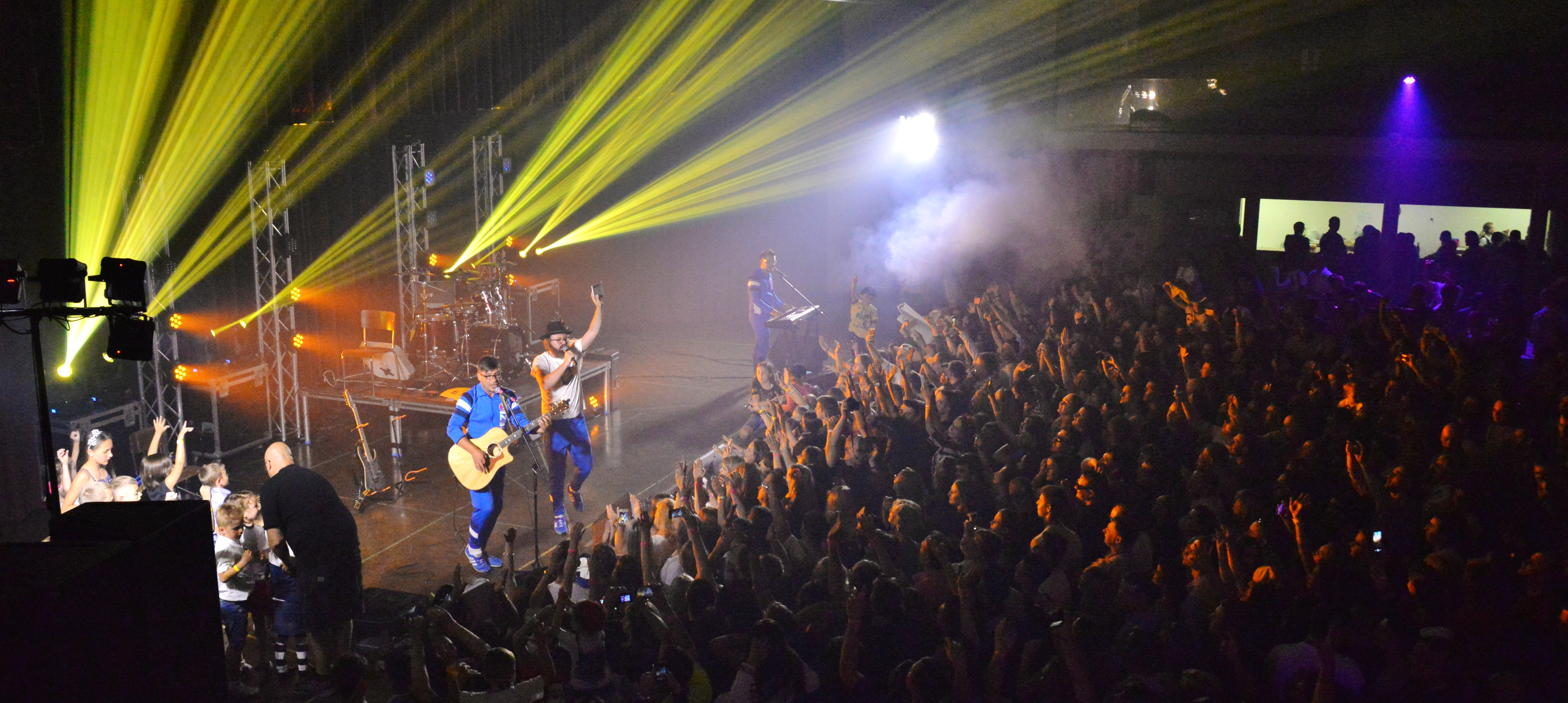
DZIDZIO performing in Toronto in July 2015.

Turko died in Lviv on 22 November 2025, at the age of 58.

== Discography ==
=== Albums ===
==== DZIDZIO SUPER-PUPER, 2018 ====
| Track | Title | Music | Lyrics |
|---|---|---|---|
| 1 | Banda-Banda | Mykhailo Khoma | M. Khoma |
| 2 | Vyhidniy | Mykhailo Khoma | M. Khoma |
| 3 | 108 | M. Khoma | M. Khoma, Ya. Tovstyha |
| 4 | Ptahopodibna | M. Khoma | M. Khoma |
| 5 | Marsik | M. Khoma | M. Khoma, V. Parfenyuk |
| 6 | Marshrutka | A. Kuzmenko | Andriy Kuzmenko |
| 7 | Ne matiukaisia | M. Khoma | M. Khoma, V. Parfenyuk |
| 8 | Ne matiukaisia (Concert Version) | M. Khoma | M. Khoma, V. Parfenyuk |
| 9 | Ya yidu do mamy | Mykhailo Khoma | M. Khoma |
| 10 | Chekayu. Ciom (feat Olya Tsybulska) | Olha Tsybulska | Olha Tsybulska |
| 11 | Rozluk ne bude (feat Ivan Popovych) | B. Hrytsak | B. Hrytsak |

==== DZIDZIO Hits, 2014 ====
| Track | Title | Music | Lyrics |
|---|---|---|---|
| 1 | Ya i Sara | M. Khoma | M. Khoma |
| 2 | Susidy | M. Khoma | M. Khoma |
| 3 | Pavuk | M. Khoma | M. Khoma, V. Parfenyuk |
| 4 | A ya - a ya | M. Khoma | M. Khoma |
| 5 | 3 v 1 | M. Khoma | M. Khoma |
| 6 | Meni povezlo | M. Khoma | M. Khoma |
| 7 | Ja cie kocham | M. Khoma, O. Turko | M. Khoma, O. Turko |
| 8 | Kobita | M. Khoma | V. Baranov |
| 9 | Vasylyna | I. Popovych | A. Dragomyretskiy |
| 10 | Staryi rik minae | folk | folk |
| 11 | Kadilak (DJ Ozeroff & DJ Sky Edit) | M. Khoma | M. Khoma |
| 12 | Das ist gut fantastisch (Dawson & Creek Edit) | M. Khoma, O. Turko | M. Khoma, O. Turko |
| 13 | Ya i Sara (DJ Ozeroff & DJ Sky Edit) | M. Khoma | M. Khoma |
| 14 | Pavuk (DJ Ozeroff & DJ Sky Edit) | M. Khoma | M. Khoma, V. Parfenyuk |

==== HA-HA-HA, 2012 ====
| Track | Title | Music | Lyrics |
|---|---|---|---|
| 1 | A ya - a ya | M. Khoma | M. Khoma |
| 2 | Yalta | A. Kuzmenko | A. Kuzmenko |
| 3 | Sama-sama | M. Khoma, O. Turko | M. Khoma, O. Turko |
| 4 | Hopa-hopa | A. Kuzmenko | A. Kuzmenko |
| 5 | Kobita | M. Khoma | V. Baranov |
| 6 | Kadilak | M. Khoma | M. Khoma |
| 7 | Busku | M. Khoma, O. Turko | M. Khoma, O. Turko |
| 8 | Ja cie kocham | M. Khoma, O. Turko | M. Khoma, O. Turko |
| 9 | Holi divchata | A. Kuzmenko | A. Kuzmenko |
| 10 | Serenada | O. Turko | O. Turko |
| 11 | Das ist gut fantastisch | M. Khoma, O. Turko | M. Khoma, O. Turko |
| 12 | HA-HA-HA | M. Khoma, O. Turko | M. Khoma |
| 13 | Stari fotografiyi | A. Kuzmenko | A. Kuzmenko |
| 14 | Ja cie kocham (Live) | M. Khoma, O. Turko | M. Khoma, O. Turko |

=== Singles ===
| Title | Music | Lyrics | Year |
|---|---|---|---|
| Ja cie kocham (sympho version) (feat A. Dolesko) | M. Khoma, A. Dolesko | M. Khoma | 2015 |

== Music videos ==
| Year | Title | Director | Camera | Writer |
|---|---|---|---|---|
| 2017 | Vyhidniy | L. Kolosovsky | V. Voronin | M. Khoma, L. Kolosovsky |
| 2017 | Chekayu. Ciom | D. Manifest, D. Shmurak | D. Manifest | |
| 2017 | Banda-Banda | V. Shurubura | O. Roschin | V. Shurubura, M. Khoma |
| 2017 | Ne matiukaisia | V. Pravdin | V. Melnyk | Pravdin Production |
| 2016 | 108 | L. Levitski | O. Khoroshko | L. Levitski, M. Khoma |
| 2016 | Ptahopodibna | V. Shurubura | O. Roschin | V. Shurubura |
| 2016 | MARSIK | S. Tkachenko | O. Khoroshko | S. Tkachenko |
| 2015 | Ya yidu do mamy | O. Denysenko | O. Roschin | Lee Lamen, O. Denysenko |
| 2015 | 3 v 1 | I. Butylyuk | I. Butylyuk | I. Butylyuk |
| 2014 | Pavuk | M. Khoma | O. Pozdnyakov | M. Khoma |
| 2013 | Staryi rik minae | V. Shurubura | A. Vynnyk | V. Shurubura, A. Vynnyk |
| 2013 | Ya i Sara | V. Shurubura | V. Shurubura | V. Shurubura, A. Vynnyk |
| 2013 | Meni povezlo | O. Denysenko | O. Roschin | O. Denysenko |
| 2013 | Susidy | V. Shurubura | V. Shurubura | V. Shurubura |
| 2012 | Das ist gut fantastisch (Internet version) | V. Shurubura | V. Shurubura | V. Shurubura |
| 2012 | HA-HA-HA | V. Shurubura | V. Shurubura | M. Khoma |
| 2012 | Kadilak | V. Shurubura | V. Shurubura | V. Shurubura, M. Khoma |
| 2011 | Sama-sama | V. Shurubura | V. Shurubura | V. Shurubura |
| 2011 | Yalta | V. Shurubura | V. Shurubura | V. Shurubura |
| 2009 | Stari fotografiyi | V. Yermolenko | | |

== Music videos (DZIDZIOFILM) ==
| Year | Title | Director | Camera | Writer |
|---|---|---|---|---|
| 2016 | MARSIK (uncensored) | M. Khoma | O. Roschin | M. Khoma |
| 2015 | Ya yidu do mamy | M. Khoma | O. Roschin | M. Khoma |
| 2014 | Angely chudyatsya | M. Khoma, T. Dron' | O. Roschin | M. Khoma |
| 2014 | Pavuk (uncensored) | M. Khoma, T. Dron' | O. Pozdnyakov | M. Khoma |
| 2013 | Lyst do Mykolaya | M. Khoma, T. Dron' | M. Khoma, T. Dron' | M. Khoma |
| 2013 | Povna sraka (uncensored) | V. Shurubura | V. Shurubura | M. Khoma |
| 2013 | Narodzhennya legendy (cartoon) | studio KEMEO | studio KEMEO | studio KEMEO |
| 2012 | HA-HA-HA (uncensored) | V. Shurubura | V. Shurubura | M. Khoma |
| 2012 | Kadilak (uncensored) | V. Shurubura | V. Shurubura | M. Khoma |
| 2011 | Sama-sama (uncensored) | V. Shurubura | V. Shurubura | M. Khoma |
| 2011 | Yalta (uncensored) | V. Shurubura | V. Shurubura | |

== Awards and nominations ==
| Year | Award | Nomination | Result |
|---|---|---|---|
| 2014 | YUNA | Best band | Nomination |
| 2015 | YUNA | Best band | Nomination |
| 2015 | M1 Music Awards | Best band | Won |
| 2016 | YUNA | Best band | Nomination |
| 2016 | YUNA | Best management (Meison Entertainment) | Nomination |
