= Druha Rika =

Ukrainian rock band

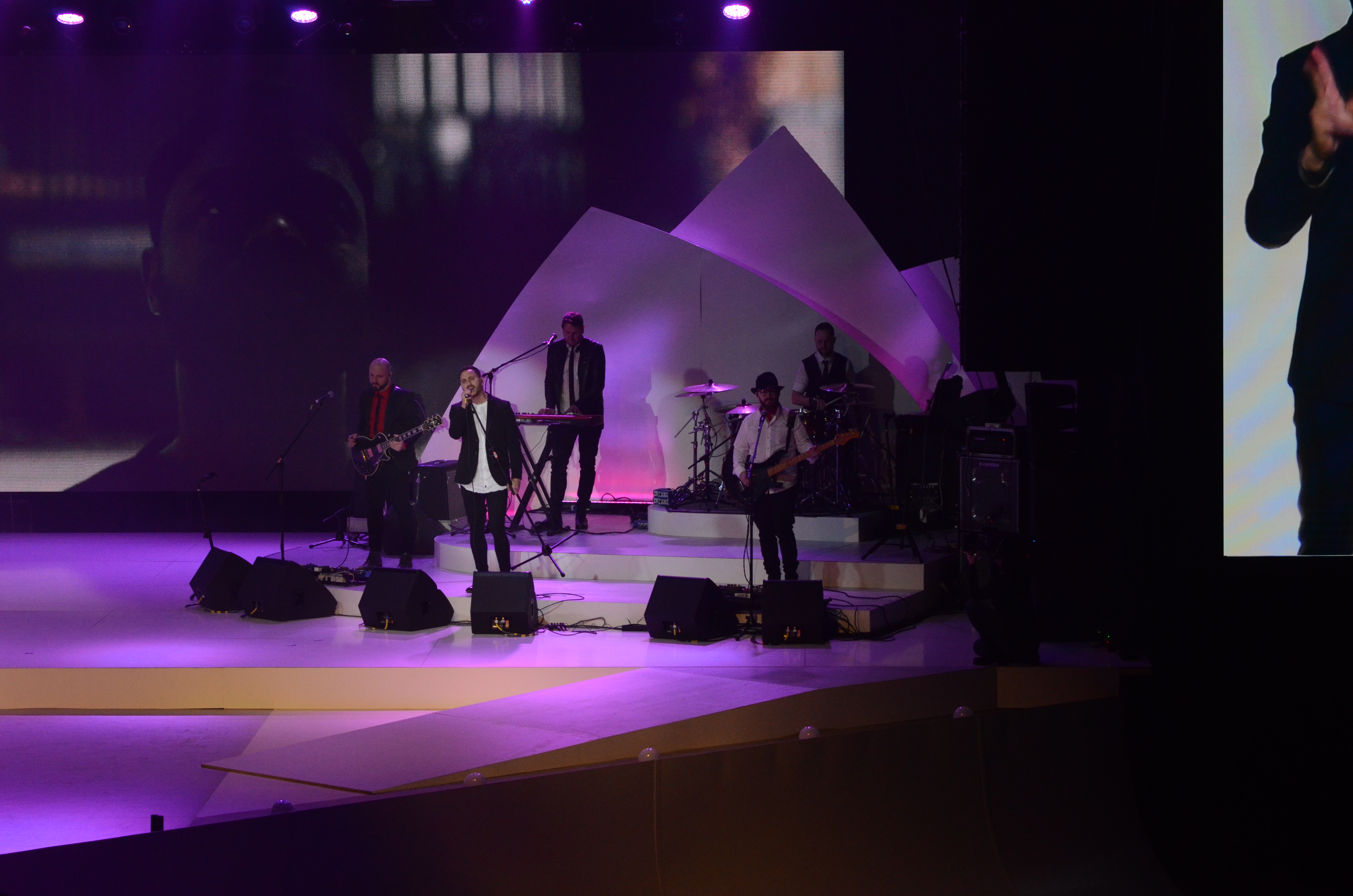
- Live concert band Druha Rika in 2018

Background information
- Origin: Zhytomyr, Ukraine
- Genres: Alternative rock, Brit Pop, Pop rock
- Years active: 1996 -
- Labels: Nova Records; Lavina music Moon Records
- Members: Valeriy Kharchyshyn; Oleksandr Baranovsky; Oleksiy Doroshenko; Serhiy Belichenko; Serhiy Hera (Shura); Andriy Lavrinenko
- Past members: Taras Melnichuk; Viktor Skurativsky
- Website: Druha Rika

Druha Rika (also Druga Rika, Ukrainian: Друга Ріка) is a Ukrainian rock band from Zhytomyr. Druha Rika released seven studio albums and two compilations. The name of the band means Second river.

== Members ==
Current members

- Valeriy Kharchyshyn — lead vocals, trumpet, lyrics (1996 — present)
- Oleksandr Baranovsky — guitar (1996 — present)
- Oleksiy Doroshenko — drums (1996 — present)
- Serhiy Belichenko — guitar (1998 — present)
- Serhiy Hera (Shura) — keyboards, backing vocals (2003 — present)
- Andriy Lavrinenko - bass (2014 — present)

Former members

- Taras Melnichuk — guitar (1997 — 1998)
- Viktor Skurativsky — bass (1996 — 2014)

== Discography ==
Albums

- 2000 — Я є (Pronounces: ″Ya ye″, Eng. ″I am″)
- 2003 — Два (Pronounces: ″Dva″, Eng. ″Two″)
- 2005 — Рекорди (Pronounces: ″Rekordy″, Eng. ″Recordings″)
- 2008 — Мода (Pronounces: ″Moda″, Eng. ″Fashion″)
- 2012 — Metanoia. Part 1 (Eng. ″Rethinking″)
- 2014 — Supernation
- 2017 — Піраміда (Pronounces: ″Piramida″, Eng. ″Pyramid″)

Compilations

- 2006 — Денніч (Pronounces: ″Dennich″, Eng. ″Day-Night″)
- 2009 — THE BEST

== Links ==
- Official page
- «Twitter
- LastFm
- Lyrics
- YouTube
