= Spain in the Eurovision Song Contest 2023 =

- Eurovision Song Contest 2023
- Participating broadcaster: Radiotelevisión Española (RTVE)
- Country: Spain
- Selection process: Benidorm Fest 2023
- Selection date: 4 February 2023

Competing entry
- Song: "Eaea"
- Artist: Blanca Paloma
- Songwriters: Álvaro Tato; Blanca Paloma Ramos; José Pablo Polo

Placement
- Final result: 17th, 100 points

Participation chronology

Spain was represented at the Eurovision Song Contest 2023 with the song "Eaea", written by Álvaro Tato, José Pablo Polo, and Blanca Paloma, and performed by Blanca Paloma herself. The Spanish participating broadcaster, Radiotelevisión Española (RTVE), together with the Generalitat Valenciana, organised Benidorm Fest 2023 in order to select its entry for the 2023 contest. Eighteen entries were selected to compete in the national final, which consists of three shows: two semi-finals and a final. Eight entries ultimately qualified to compete in the final on 4 February 2023, and the winner was determined by a combination of votes from an expert jury, a demoscopic panel and a televote.

As part of the "Big Five", Spain directly qualified to compete in the final of the Eurovision Song Contest.

== Background ==
Prior to the 2023 contest, Televisión Española (TVE) until 2006, and Radiotelevisión Española (RTVE) since 2007, had participated in the Eurovision Song Contest representing Spain sixty-one times since TVE's first entry in 1961. They have won the contest on two occasions: in 1968 with the song "La, la, la" performed by Massiel and in 1969 with the song "Vivo cantando" performed by Salomé, the latter having won in a four-way tie with France, the Netherlands, and the United Kingdom. They have also finished second four times, with "En un mundo nuevo" by Karina in 1971, "Eres tú" by Mocedades in 1973, "Su canción" by Betty Missiego in 1979, and "Vuelve conmigo" by Anabel Conde in 1995. In 2022, RTVE placed third with the song "SloMo" performed by Chanel.

As part of its duties as participating broadcaster, RTVE organises the selection of its entry in the Eurovision Song Contest and broadcasts the event in the country. RTVE confirmed its intentions to participate at the 2023 contest on 18 June 2022. The Spanish broadcaster has selected its entry for the Eurovision Song Contest through both national finals and internal selections in the past. Along with their participation confirmation, RTVE revealed details regarding their selection procedure and announced the organization of Benidorm Fest 2023 in order to select its 2023 entry.

== Before Eurovision ==
=== Benidorm Fest 2023 ===
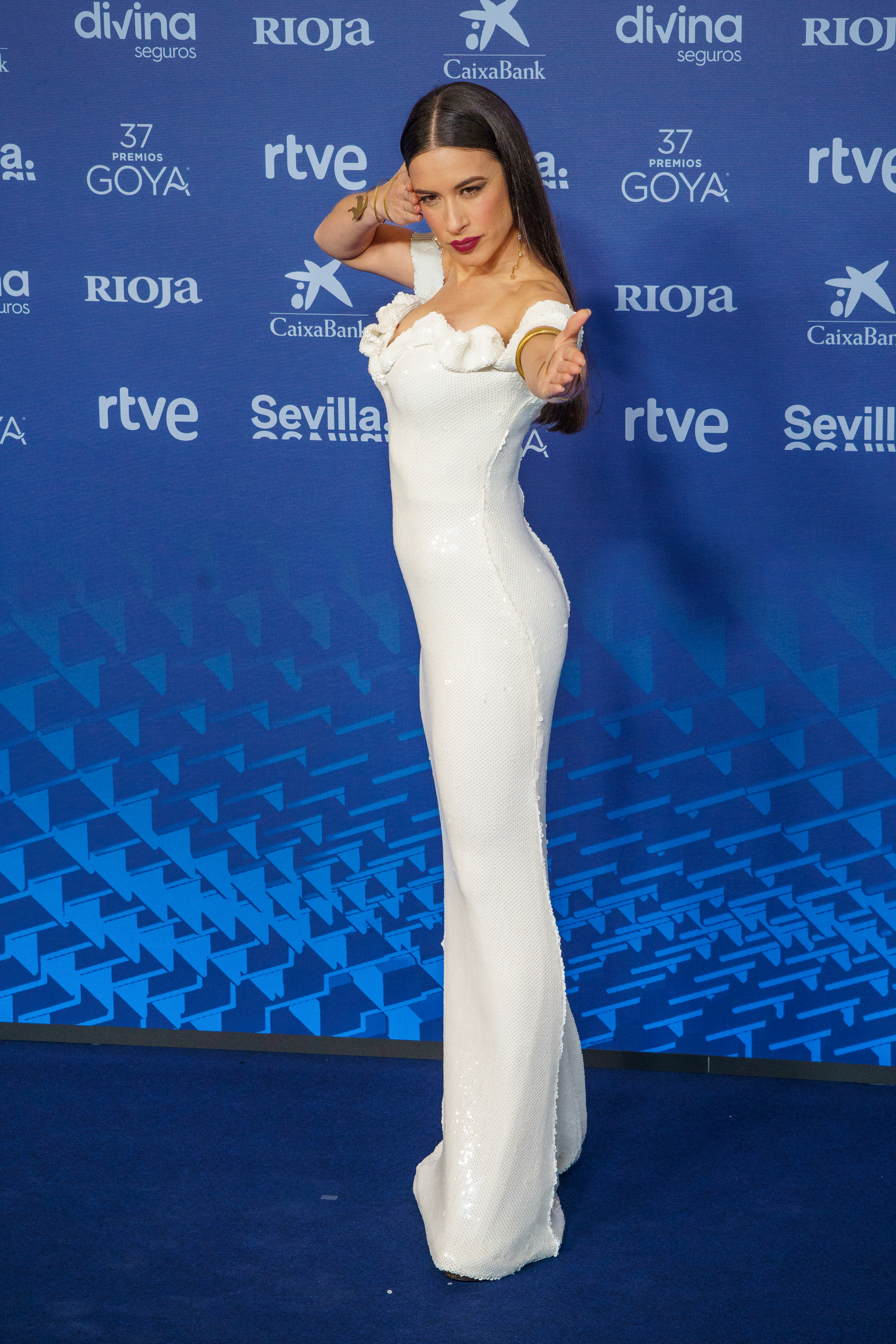
Blanca Paloma at the 37th Goya Awards on 11 February 2023

Benidorm Fest 2023 was the second edition of Benidorm Fest, organised by RTVE and Generalitat Valenciana to select the Spanish entry for the Eurovision Song Contest 2023. The event took place at the Palau Municipal d'Esports l'Illa de Benidorm in Benidorm, Valencian Community, hosted by Mónica Naranjo, Inés Hernand, and Rodrigo Vázquez. Eighteen artists and songs competed over three shows: two semi-finals on 31 January and 2 February 2023 and the final on 4 February 2023.

The semi-finals were broadcast on two nights of the same week, and the voting consisted of voting system consisted the televote (50%), a demoscopic panel of judges made up of a sample of the Spanish population selected by statistical and demoscopic criteria (25%), and a national and international jury vote (50%). Nine acts competed in each semifinal, with the top four advancing to the final.

==== Semi-finals ====
- The first semi-final took place on 31 January 2023. "Quiero arder" performed by Agoney, "Yo quisiera" performed by Alice Wonder, "Mi familia" performed by Fusa Nocta and "Arcadia" performed by Megara advanced to the final, while "Flamenco" performed by Aritz, "Aire" performed by Sharonne, "No nos moverán" performed by Meler, "Sayonara" performed by Twin Melody and "Tuki" performed by Sofía Martín were eliminated.
- The second semi-final took place on 2 February 2023. "Eaea" performed by Blanca Paloma, "Nochentera" performed by Vicco, "Quiero y duelo" performed by Karmento and "Inviernos en Marte" performed by José Otero advanced to the final, while "Desde que tú estás" performed by Alfred García, "Que esclati tot" performed by Siderland, "La Lola" performed by Famous, "Uff!" performed by E'Femme and "Tracción" performed by Rakky Ripper were eliminated.

==== Final ====
The final took place on 4 February 2023 and consisted of the eight entries that qualified from the two preceding semi-finals.

Final – 4 February 2023
R/O	Artist	Song	Expert jury	Demoscopic jury	Televote	Total	Place
1	Karmento	"Quiero y duelo"	35	20	25	80	6
2	Megara	"Arcadia"	50	28	28	106	4
3	Alice Wonder	"Yo quisiera"	53	16	20	89	5
4	Fusa Nocta	"Mi familia"	24	25	22	71	8
5	Agoney	"Quiero arder"	80	30	35	145	2
6	Blanca Paloma	"Eaea"	94	35	40	169	1
7	José Otero	"Inviernos en Marte"	37	22	16	75	7
8	Vicco	"Nochentera"	59	40	30	129	3

== At Eurovision ==
According to Eurovision rules, all nations with the exceptions of the host country and the "Big Five" (France, Germany, Italy, Spain and the United Kingdom) are required to qualify from one of two semi-finals in order to compete for the final; the top ten countries from each semi-final progress to the final. As a member of the "Big Five", Spain automatically qualified to compete in the final on 13 May 2023. In addition to its participation in the final, Spain was also required to broadcast and vote in one of the two semi-finals. This was decided via a draw held during the semi-final allocation draw on 31 January 2023, when it was announced that Spain would be voting in the second semi-final.

Spain received 95 points from the jury while coming last in the televoting (5 points), ultimately receiving a combined score of 100 points and placing 17th. The result was considered a "disappointment" by some media outlets and some members of the public in Spain.

=== Voting ===
==== Points awarded to Spain ====
Points awarded to Spain (Final)
Score	Televote	Jury
12 points		
10 points		Portugal
8 points		Latvia
7 points		Azerbaijan; Germany; Netherlands
6 points		Armenia; Belgium; Croatia; Cyprus
5 points		United Kingdom
4 points		Australia
3 points	Portugal	Czech Republic; Iceland; Moldova; Serbia; Switzerland
2 points	Rest of the World	Estonia; San Marino; Slovenia
1 point		Albania; Norway

==== Points awarded by Spain ====
Points awarded by Spain (Semi-final)
Score	Televote
12 points	Slovenia
10 points	Armenia
8 points	Belgium
7 points	Australia
6 points	Austria
5 points	Lithuania
4 points	Poland
3 points	Cyprus
2 points	Albania
1 point	Estonia

Points awarded by Spain (Final)
Score	Televote	Jury
12 points	Finland	Sweden
10 points	Ukraine	Italy
8 points	Norway	Israel
7 points	Israel	Estonia
6 points	Italy	Portugal
5 points	Sweden	France
4 points	Portugal	Belgium
3 points	Belgium	Armenia
2 points	Armenia	Norway
1 point	Moldova	Finland

==== Detailed voting results ====
The following members comprised the Spanish jury:

- Aaron Sáez Escolano – musician, member of Varry Brava
- Francisco Javier Viñolo Linares – stage director, dancer, choreographer
- Estefanía García – coordinator of the RTVE Choir and Orchestra
- Marta Sánchez Gómez – singer
- Victoria Leonor Gómez – dancer, choreographer

Detailed voting results from Spain (Semi-final 2)
R/O	Country	Televote	
R/O	Country	Rank	Points
01	Denmark	14	
02	Armenia	2	10
03	Romania	13	
04	Estonia	10	1
05	Belgium	3	8
06	Cyprus	8	3
07	Iceland	11	
08	Greece	15	
09	Poland	7	4
10	Slovenia	1	12
11	Georgia	12	
12	San Marino	16	
13	Austria	5	6
14	Albania	9	2
15	Lithuania	6	5
16	Australia	4	7

Detailed voting results from Spain (Final)
R/O	Country	Jury							Televote	
R/O	Country	Juror 1	Juror 2	Juror 3	Juror 4	Juror 5	Rank	Points	Rank	Points
01	Austria	14	16	15	13	17	17		18	
02	Portugal	3	13	3	7	13	5	6	7	4
03	Switzerland	8	17	14	19	8	12		19	
04	Poland	17	23	18	24	20	24		11	
05	Serbia	20	21	24	15	23	23		24	
06	France	4	5	6	11	7	6	5	12	
07	Cyprus	11	11	13	22	5	11		15	
08	Spain									
09	Sweden	1	1	1	1	1	1	12	6	5
10	Albania	19	19	16	16	18	21		25	
11	Italy	7	3	2	2	2	2	10	5	6
12	Estonia	6	4	8	6	4	4	7	23	
13	Finland	24	9	25	4	14	10	1	1	12
14	Czech Republic	23	20	20	18	15	22		21	
15	Australia	16	10	12	10	22	14		22	
16	Belgium	12	6	4	3	12	7	4	8	3
17	Armenia	9	8	5	8	6	8	3	9	2
18	Moldova	21	24	23	17	19	25		10	1
19	Ukraine	18	14	17	23	9	15		2	10
20	Norway	5	7	21	12	10	9	2	3	8
21	Germany	10	15	22	21	21	18		14	
22	Lithuania	13	18	11	20	16	16		16	
23	Israel	2	2	7	5	3	3	8	4	7
24	Slovenia	22	22	10	25	24	20		13	
25	Croatia	25	25	19	9	25	19		17	
26	United Kingdom	15	12	9	14	11	13		20	
