= Portugal in the Eurovision Song Contest 2023 =

- Eurovision Song Contest 2023
- Participating broadcaster: Rádio e Televisão de Portugal (RTP)
- Country: Portugal
- Selection process: Festival da Canção 2023
- Selection date: 11 March 2023

Competing entry
- Song: "Ai coração"
- Artist: Mimicat
- Songwriters: Marisa Mena; Luís Pereira

Placement
- Semi-final result: Qualified (9th, 74 points)
- Final result: 23rd, 59 points

Participation chronology

Portugal was represented at the Eurovision Song Contest 2023 with the song "Ai coração" performed by Mimicat. The Portuguese participating broadcaster, Rádio e Televisão de Portugal (RTP), organised the national final Festival da Canção 2023 in order to select its entry for the contest. After two semi-finals and a final which took place in February–March 2023, "Ai coração" emerged as the winner after achieving the highest score following the combination of votes from seven regional juries and a public televote.

Portugal was drawn to compete in the first semi-final of the Eurovision Song Contest which took place on 9 May 2023. Performing during the show in position 5, "Ai coração" was announced as one of the top 10 entries and therefore qualified to compete in the final on 13 May. In the final, Portugal performed in position 2 and placed 23rd out of the 26 countries with 59 points (43 from the jury vote and 16 from the public vote).

== Background ==
Prior to the 2023 contest, Radiotelevisão Portuguesa (RTP) until 2003, and Rádio e Televisão de Portugal (RTP) since 2004, had participated in the Eurovision Song Contest representing Portugal 53 times since their first entry in 1964. Portugal had won the contest on one occasion: in 2017 with the song "Amar pelos dois" performed by Salvador Sobral. Following the introduction of semi-finals for the 2004, Portugal had featured in only seven finals. Portugal's least successful result has been last place, which they have achieved on four occasions, most recently in 2018 with the song "O jardim" performed by Cláudia Pascoal. Portugal has also received nul points on two occasions; in 1964 and 1997. In 2022, Portugal placed ninth with the song "Saudade, saudade" performed by Maro.

As part of its duties as participating broadcaster, RTP organises the selection of its entry in the Eurovision Song Contest and broadcasts the event in the country. The broadcaster confirmed its participation in the 2023 contest on 2 September 2022. RTP has traditionally selected its entry for the contest via the music competition Festival da Canção, with exceptions in 1988 and in 2005 when the entries were internally selected. Along with its participation confirmation, RTP announced the organization of Festival da Canção in order to select its 2023 entry.

== Before Eurovision ==
=== Festival da Canção 2023 ===
The official logotype of Festival da Canção 2023

The 2023 edition of Festival da Canção featured two semi-finals and a final, and saw 20 acts compete.

==== Format ====
The format of the competition consisted of three shows: two semi-finals and a final. Each semi-final featured 10 competing entries from which six advanced from each show to complete the 12-song lineup in the final. Results during the semi-finals were determined by the votes from a jury panel appointed by RTP and public televoting; the first five qualifiers were based on the 50/50 combination of jury and public voting where both streams of voting assign points from 1–8, 10 and 12 based on ranking, while the sixth qualifier was determined by a second round of public televoting from the remaining entries. Results during the final were determined by the 50/50 combination of votes from seven regional juries and public televoting, which was opened following the second semi-final and closed during the final show. Both the public televote and the juries assign points from 1–8, 10 and 12 based on the ranking developed by both streams of voting.

All three shows of the competition took place at RTP's Studio 1 in Lisbon and were broadcast on RTP1 and RTP Internacional as well as on radio via Antena 1 and online via RTP Play. The shows were also broadcast on RTP Accessibilidades with presentation in Portuguese Sign Language and in Spain online via RTVE Play.

==== Competing entries ====
Twenty composers were selected by RTP through two methods: 15 invited by RTP for the competition and five selected from 667 submissions received through an open call for songs. The composers, which both create the songs and select its performers, were required to submit the demo and final versions of their entries by 31 October and 30 November 2022, respectively. Songs could be submitted in any language. The selected composers were revealed on 9 November 2022, while the competing artists and songs were revealed on 19 January 2023. Among the competing artists was Cláudia Pascoal, who represented Portugal in the Eurovision Song Contest 2018.

Artist	Song	Songwriter(s)	Selection
April Ivy	"Modo voo"	Mariana Gonçalves, João Maia Ferreira, Francisco Santos, Manuel Morgado, Ricardo Moreira, Matheus Paraízo, Francisco Andrade	Invited by RTP
Bandua	"Bandeiras"	Bernardo Adário, Edgar Valente	Invited by RTP
Bárbara Tinoco	"Goodnight"	Bárbara Tinoco, Mateus Seabra	Invited by RTP
Bolha	"Sonhos de liberdade"	Jacinta, Joana Gil	Invited by RTP
Churky	"Encruzilhada"	Churky	Invited by RTP
Cláudia Pascoal	"Nasci Maria"	Cláudia Pascoal	Invited by RTP
Dapunksportif	"World Needs Therapy"	João Guincho, Paulo Franco	Invited by RTP
Edmundo Inácio	"A festa"	Edmundo Inácio	Open call winner
Esse Povo	"Sapatos de cimento"	Quim Albergaria	Invited by RTP
Inês Apenas	"Fim do mundo"	Inês Apenas	Open call winner
Ivandro	"Povo"	Ivandro	Invited by RTP
Lara Li	"Funâmbula"	André Henriques	Invited by RTP
Mimicat	"Ai coração"	Marisa Mena, Luís Pereira	Open call winner
Moyah	"Too Much Sauce"	Moyah, Kensaye, Miguel Gutierrez	Open call winner
Neon Soho	"Endless World"	Neon Soho	Invited by RTP
SAL	"Viver"	Sérgio Pires, SAL	Invited by RTP
Teresinha Landeiro	"Enquanto é tempo"	Pedro de Castro, Teresinha Landeiro	Invited by RTP
The Happy Mess	"O impossível"	João Pascoal, Afonso Carvalho, Miguel Ribeiro, Paulo Mouta Pereira, Bruno Vieira Amaral	Invited by RTP
Voodoo Marmalade	"Tormento"	Voodoo Marmalade	Open call winner
You Can't Win, Charlie Brown	"Contraste mudo"	Afonso Cabral, David Santos, João Gil, Pedro Branco, Salvador Menezes, Tomás Sousa	Invited by RTP

==== Semi-finals ====
The two semi-finals took place on 25 February and 4 March 2023. In each semi-final, 10 entries competed and six advanced to the final: five based on the 50/50 combination of votes from the televote and a jury panel consisting of Alex D'Alva, Carlos Mendes, Márcia, Maro, Neev, Pedro Ribeiro and Sara Correia. One additional entry was then selected by televoting exclusively. The first semi-final was hosted by Tânia Ribas de Oliveira and José Carlos Malato. Throughout all shows, Inês Lopes Gonçalves was in charge of the green room alongside Wandson Lisboa, the social media correspondent. In addition to the performances of the competing entries, HMB together with Nena, Ana Bacalhau and Wander Isaac, Fernando Tordo and Spanish Eurovision 2023 entrant Blanca Paloma performed as guests in the first semi-final. The second semi-final was hosted by Jorge Gabriel and Sónia Araújo, while Filipe Sambado together with Surma and Primeira Dama, juror Carlos Mendes, and Portuguese representative in Junior Eurovision 2022, Nicolas Alves, performed as guests.

Esse Povo, who took part in the first semi-final with their song "Sapatos de cimento", automatically qualified from the jury and televote round due to a technical issue related to their televoting line discovered during the first semi-final, resulting in the final featuring 13 artists instead of the planned 12.

Key:
Jury and televote round qualifier
Televote-only round qualifier

Semi-final 1 – 25 February 2023
R/O	Artist	Song	Jury	Televote		Total	Place
R/O	Artist	Song	Jury	Percentage	Points	Total	Place
1	Moyah	"Too Much Sauce"	3	1.73%	2	5	8
2	Bolha	"Sonhos de liberdade"	2	6.17%	4	6	7
3	April Ivy	"Modo voo"	1	3.61%	3	4	9
4	Churky	"Encruzilhada"	5	19.11%	10	15	5
5	Cláudia Pascoal	"Nasci Maria"	12	14.29%	8	20	1
6	SAL	"Viver"	8	10.21%	7	15	4
7	Mimicat	"Ai coração"	7	19.37%	12	19	2
8	You Can't Win, Charlie Brown	"Contraste mudo"	10	8.45%	5	15	3
9	Neon Soho	"Endless World"	6	9.57%	6	12	6
10	Esse Povo	"Sapatos de cimento"	4	7.49%	—	—	—

Semi-final 1 – Second round
Artist	Song	Televote	Place
April Ivy	"Modo voo"	16.80%	3
Bolha	"Sonhos de liberdade"	17.30%	2
Moyah	"Too Much Sauce"	10.32%	4
Neon Soho	"Endless World"	55.58%	1

Semi-final 2 – 4 March 2023
R/O	Artist	Song	Jury	Televote		Total	Place
R/O	Artist	Song	Jury	Percentage	Points	Total	Place
1	Edmundo Inácio	"A festa"	10	10.18%	7	17	1
2	The Happy Mess	"O impossível"	3	8.81%	6	9	8
3	Teresinha Landeiro	"Enquanto é tempo"	7	8.25%	5	12	6
4	Bandua	"Bandeiras"	4	6.44%	3	7	9
5	Bárbara Tinoco	"Goodnight"	12	5.91%	1	13	4
6	Inês Apenas	"Fim do mundo"	6	11.71%	8	14	3
7	Ivandro	"Povo"	8	7.32%	4	12	5
8	Dapunksportif	"World Needs Therapy"	2	15.38%	10	12	7
9	Lara Li	"Funâmbula"	1	6.26%	2	3	10
10	Voodoo Marmalade	"Tormento"	5	19.74%	12	17	2

Semi-final 2 – Second round
Artist	Song	Televote	Place
Bandua	"Bandeiras"	19.10%	3
Dapunksportif	"World Needs Therapy"	26.83%	1
Lara Li	"Funâmbula"	19.81%	2
Teresinha Landeiro	"Enquanto é tempo"	18.70%	4
The Happy Mess	"O impossível"	15.56%	5

==== Final ====
The final took place on 11 March 2023 and was hosted by Filomena Cautela and Vasco Palmeirim, who were joined by green room host Inês Lopes Gonçalves and digital content and social media host Wandson Lisboa. Interval acts included a The Beatles medley by Eurovision Song Contest 2017 winner Salvador Sobral, a reprise of "Saudade, saudade" by Maro featuring several finalists of Festival da Canção 2022, and a medley of songs from Liverpudlian artists by David Fonseca. The winner was selected based on the 50/50 combination of votes from seven regional juries and from a public televote.

Final – 11 March 2023
R/O	Artist	Song	Jury		Televote		Total	Place
R/O	Artist	Song	Votes	Points	Percentage	Points	Total	Place
1	Cláudia Pascoal	"Nasci Maria"	48	8	8.21%	4	12	3
2	Churky	"Encruzilhada"	5	0	8.26%	5	5	9
3	Esse Povo	"Sapatos de cimento"	30	4	2.82%	0	4	11
4	Bárbara Tinoco	"Goodnight"	27	3	8.58%	6	9	4
5	You Can't Win, Charlie Brown	"Contraste mudo"	45	7	3.74%	0	7	8
6	Voodoo Marmalade	"Tormento"	5	0	9.02%	7	7	7
7	Inês Apenas	"Fim do mundo"	26	2	4.55%	1	3	13
8	Mimicat	"Ai coração"	66	12	19.33%	12	24	1
9	Dapunksportif	"World Needs Therapy"	2	0	9.17%	8	8	6
10	Neon Soho	"Endless World"	33	5	3.96%	0	5	10
11	Ivandro	"Povo"	43	6	5.42%	3	9	5
12	Edmundo Inácio	"A festa"	66	12	12.24%	10	22	2
13	SAL	"Viver"	10	1	4.70%	2	3	12

Detailed regional jury votes
R/O	Song	North	Central	Lisbon Area	Alentejo	Algarve	Madeira	Azores	Total
1	"Nasci Maria"	3	7	10	8	8	6	6	48
2	"Encruzilhada"				2	2	1		5
3	"Sapatos de cimento"	4	2	2	5	5	5	7	30
4	"Goodnight"	2	5	5	7	6	2		27
5	"Contraste mudo"	7	4	7	4	12	10	1	45
6	"Tormento"		1			1		3	5
7	"Fim do mundo"	6	3	6	1	7	3		26
8	"Ai coração"	5	12	12	10	3	12	12	66
9	"World Needs Therapy"							2	2
10	"Endless World"	10	8	3	3	4		5	33
11	"Povo"	12	6	4	6	4	7	4	43
12	"A festa"	8	10	8	12	10	8	10	66
13	"Viver"	1		1				8	10
Members of the jury
North: Ana Aroso, João Pedro Coimbra, Graciela; Central: Isilda Sanches, Tiago Nogueira, Susie Filipe; Lisbon Area: Elisa Rodrigues, Bruno Vasconcelos, Gabriela Barros; Alentejo: Cristina Branco, Pedro Madeira, Buba Espinho; Algarve: Júlio Resende, Gil Silva, Sara Afonso; Madeira: Guilherme Gomes, Diana Duarte, Mara; Azores: Maria Bettencourt, Maria do Rosário Pereira, Miguel Damião

==== Ratings ====
Viewing figures by show
Show	Air date	Viewers	Share (%)	Ref.
Semi-final 1	25 February 2023	477,000	11.4%	
Semi-final 2	4 March 2023	505,000	12.9%	
Final	11 March 2023	560,000	15.4%	

== At Eurovision ==
According to Eurovision rules, all nations with the exceptions of the host country and the "Big Five" (France, Germany, Italy, Spain and the United Kingdom) are required to qualify from one of two semi-finals in order to compete for the final; the top 10 countries from each semi-final progress to the final. The European Broadcasting Union (EBU) split up the competing countries into six different pots based on voting patterns from previous contests, with countries with favourable voting histories put into the same pot. On 31 January 2023, an allocation draw was held, which placed each country into one of the two semi-finals, and determined which half of the show they would perform in. Portugal has been placed into the first semi-final, to be held on 9 May 2023, and has been scheduled to perform in the first half of the show.

Once all the competing songs for the 2023 contest had been released, the running order for the semi-finals was decided by the shows' producers rather than through another draw, so that similar songs were not placed next to each other. Portugal was set to perform in position 5, following the entry from Latvia and before the entry from Ireland.

At the end of the show, Portugal was announced as a qualifier for the final.

=== Voting ===
==== Points awarded to Portugal ====
Points awarded to Portugal (Semi-final 1)
Score	Televote
12 points	France; Switzerland
10 points	
8 points	
7 points	Netherlands
6 points	Rest of the World
5 points	Croatia; Germany
4 points	Malta; Moldova; Sweden
3 points	Israel; Serbia
2 points	Czech Republic; Finland; Italy; Norway
1 point	Ireland

Points awarded to Portugal (Final)
Score	Televote	Jury
12 points		
10 points		Greece
8 points		Moldova
7 points	Switzerland	
6 points		Spain
5 points	France	France; Netherlands
4 points	Spain	
3 points		Finland; Malta
2 points		Australia
1 point		Croatia

==== Points awarded by Portugal ====
Points awarded by Portugal (Semi-final 1)
Score	Televote
12 points	Moldova
10 points	Finland
8 points	Sweden
7 points	Israel
6 points	Czech Republic
5 points	Switzerland
4 points	Latvia
3 points	Norway
2 points	Ireland
1 point	Netherlands

Points awarded by Portugal (Final)
Score	Televote	Jury
12 points	Ukraine	Australia
10 points	Finland	Spain
8 points	Moldova	Estonia
7 points	Sweden	Czech Republic
6 points	Italy	Belgium
5 points	Israel	Sweden
4 points	Norway	Serbia
3 points	Spain	Croatia
2 points	France	Switzerland
1 point	Belgium	Norway

==== Detailed voting results ====
The following members comprised the Portuguese jury:

- Gustavo Almeida
- Nuno Mota
- Ana Carina Almeida
- Milhanas
- Patrícia Antunes

Detailed voting results from Portugal (Semi-final 1)
R/O	Country	Televote	
R/O	Country	Rank	Points
01	Norway	8	3
02	Malta	13	
03	Serbia	11	
04	Latvia	7	4
05	Portugal		
06	Ireland	9	2
07	Croatia	12	
08	Switzerland	6	5
09	Israel	4	7
10	Moldova	1	12
11	Sweden	3	8
12	Azerbaijan	14	
13	Czech Republic	5	6
14	Netherlands	10	1
15	Finland	2	10

Detailed voting results from Portugal (Final)
R/O	Country	Jury							Televote	
R/O	Country	Juror 1	Juror 2	Juror 3	Juror 4	Juror 5	Rank	Points	Rank	Points
01	Austria	16	12	14	16	8	14		20	
02	Portugal									
03	Switzerland	6	9	9	12	11	9	2	11	
04	Poland	25	25	25	25	25	25		17	
05	Serbia	4	5	6	14	7	7	4	23	
06	France	13	18	8	13	21	15		9	2
07	Cyprus	11	13	11	17	24	17		12	
08	Spain	3	1	1	11	9	2	10	8	3
09	Sweden	8	3	5	1	17	6	5	4	7
10	Albania	18	24	24	15	5	12		25	
11	Italy	15	14	10	9	18	13		5	6
12	Estonia	5	7	2	5	3	3	8	21	
13	Finland	24	22	20	4	12	11		2	10
14	Czech Republic	2	4	3	8	6	4	7	14	
15	Australia	1	2	7	3	1	1	12	18	
16	Belgium	7	10	4	2	2	5	6	10	1
17	Armenia	17	15	13	23	10	18		24	
18	Moldova	23	19	22	6	15	16		3	8
19	Ukraine	21	11	17	21	14	20		1	12
20	Norway	14	8	12	7	19	10	1	7	4
21	Germany	19	16	23	20	23	24		13	
22	Lithuania	12	20	19	18	22	21		19	
23	Israel	20	23	18	24	16	23		6	5
24	Slovenia	10	17	16	19	20	19		16	
25	Croatia	9	6	15	10	4	8	3	15	
26	United Kingdom	22	21	21	22	13	22		22	
