= Bia season 2 =

2020 Argentine television season

Bia
- Season 2
- Season 2 English promotional poster
- No. of episodes: 60

Release
- Original network: Disney Channel Latin American
- Original release: 16 March – 24 July 2020

Season chronology
- ← Previous; Season 1

The second season of the Argentine television series Bia was produced by Non Stop Producciones and Pegsa Group, and directed by Jorge Bechara and Daniel De Filippo, the season was first announced in October 2019. It premiered on Disney Channel Latin America on 16 March 2020 and ended on 24 July 2020, once again consisting of 60 episodes. Unlike the first season, the second season is not divided into parts, although the mid-season break remained intact, with 40 episodes airing until 8 May 2020. With its original air date pushed back, the season's remaining episodes started airing in Spain on 22 June 2020, before airing in Latin America the following week.

The second season was made available on Disney + on 17 December 2020.

== Episodes ==
No. overall	No. in season	Title	Original release date
61	1	Episode 1	16 March 2020
The time has come when Bia and Helena meet in person, but much to Ana's surprise, Bia does not recognize her as a sister, but simply knows that she is Manuel's piano teacher. Meanwhile, Laix's people are waiting for the release of the new Fundom video, in order to plan an attack, since they now have full control of the system.
62	2	Episode 2	17 March 2020
Automatically, after the posting of the new Fundom clip, Bia and her friends realize that the video, as well as the files, have been mysteriously deleted from the server. Meanwhile, Ana wonders if she really had a good idea in accepting to teach Bia and Paula plans to ruin the release of Victor's album.
63	3	Episode 3	18 March 2020
Accidentally, Bia overhears Carmín's conversation with Jandino, about owning a copy of the Fundom video. Once discovered, Carmín asks for an opportunity to prove her innocence. Meanwhile, Alex and Mara plan a partnership and Victor reveals that the album's cancellation was a consequence of his mother's actions.
64	4	Episode 4	19 March 2020
With Pixie's encouragement, Carmín decides to tell the truth about the video to Fundom's people, who decide to trust her word. Meanwhile, Antonio tries to prevent the new release of the Moondust album and Ana tries to take the necessary courage to teach Bia.
65	5	Episode 5	20 March 2020
After reposting the clip, the Fundom people start to notice that something strange is happening again, since the server is blocking the likes and comments of the video. Then, Bia, Manuel and Victor get ready for the Moondust album release event, as well as the Gutiérrezes, who even against Victor's wishes, plan to participate in the festivity.
66	6	Episode 6	23 March 2020
After the altercation between the Urquizas and the Gutiérrezes at the release of the Moondust album, Bia and Manuel find themselves at odds defending their own families. Meanwhile, Pixie asks Luan for help in deciphering the problem with the likes and comments of the BeU video and Alex tries to buy Aillén's silence by offering her a collaboration on his channel.
67	7	Episode 7	24 March 2020
Bia decides that she urgently needs to apologize to Alex, so they both arrange a meeting to talk, unbeknownst that Alex is planning his revenge against her and Manuel. Meanwhile, Víctor pressures his father again to tell the truth about the accident and Ana discusses her relationship with Thiago.
68	8	Episode 8	25 March 2020
Not believing that Manuel is capable of saying terrible things about her sister, Bia tries to understand the situation by talking to him, but Manuel ends up being mad at her lack of confidence. Meanwhile, Daisy has an original idea to post a new video on her channel, but Marcos plans to get Mara to steal the idea for Laix, as revenge for exposing him at FestiRitmo.
69	9	Episode 9	26 March 2020
Fearing that he will end up hurting her, Mariano comes to the conclusion that the best thing for Bia is to stay away from Manuel, but she feels wronged by the decision. The "I Know What You Did" channel posts a video of the fight between Manuel and Alex. Meanwhile, it is revealed that Antonio was to blame for the conflict with the Urquizas, since he forced Víctor to lie that Helena was driving the car during the accident instead of Lucas, knowing that there would be bad consequences if the truth came out. Daisy discovers that Mara stole her idea for her channel's next video.
70	10	Episode 10	27 March 2020
Manuel accidentally overhears Bia's conversation about her father not approving of their relationship anymore, making them need to decide their future together. Daisy accuses Carmín of relaying her idea to Mara; only Jandino, Pixie and Luan defend Carmín while Pietro sides with Daisy. Meanwhile, the Fundom people start to suspect that Laix is related to the strange events that are taking place and Paula decides to divorce Antonio.
71	11	Episode 11	30 March 2020
Bia and Manuel agree to pretend that they have taken a break from their relationship, in order to avoid further fights and arguments between the Urquizas and the Gutiérrezes. Then, with doubts that Carmín is leaking information to Laix, the Fundom people devise a plan to discover the truth once and for all. Meanwhile, Ana tells the whole truth about her past to Luan, who now knows that Bia is her sister, but agrees to keep it a secret.
72	12	Episode 12	31 March 2020
Bia confides to Ana the secret about the false breakup with Manuel. Meanwhile, Víctor continues to carry the burden of lying about the accident and Carmín, upon discovering that the Fundom people are using her to discover the truth, decides to take action in the situation.
73	13	Episode 13	1 April 2020
When Víctor reveals to Bia new information about the accident years ago, she begins to suspect that there is something suspicious in the story. Meanwhile, Luan discovers that Pixie is his enemy in videogames and Marcos gives the news that Carmín has returned to Laix, leaving Alex and Mara uncomfortable with the situation.
74	14	Episode 14	2 April 2020
Mara finds Bia and Manuel and reveals the deception to Alex, leaving both extremely concerned about the risk of their relationship. Meanwhile, Soledad begins to feel guilty for sabotaging Thiago's confidence and Jandino decides to reveal to the Fundom people that Carmín has returned to Laix.
75	15	Episode 15	3 April 2020
Bia and Víctor talk about the accident years ago, bringing to light new truths. Meanwhile, Carmín reveals to Jandino her plan at Laix, Manuel searches for information about his father's family, Ana discovers that maybe she has strong feelings for Thiago and Celeste helps Daisy with the final of the contest.
76	16	Episode 16	6 April 2020
Believing that he will finally be able to expose Binuel's secret romance, Alex manages to create a compromising recording, but by accident, ends up losing his evidence. Meanwhile, Daisy tries to deal with the recent discovery that Pietro is her anonymous follower and Luan seeks to apologize to Pixie, to no avail. Antonio puts into motion his plan to conceal the truth about Manuel's father.
77	17	Episode 17	7 April 2020
Manuel is thrilled to finally meet an alleged close friend of his father. Meanwhile, Celeste tries to regain the sponsorship of the Dancing Games and Marcos sets up a new plan to turn BeU's followers against them.
78	18	Episode 18	8 April 2020
Fearing that the secret may come to light, Antonio is looking for a way to get rid of Manuel's father's false acquaintance. Meanwhile, Guillermo finds out that Carmín plans to implant a spy camera in Laix and Manuel and Bia plan to arrange a meeting between Ana and Víctor.
79	19	Episode 19	9 April 2020
Víctor insists that Manuel call his father's supposed friend, however, they suspect his attitude during the call. Guillermo's secret is revealed and Marcos has big plans for him, while Carmín is worried about what could happen to her secret.
80	20	Episode 20	10 April 2020
Marcos goes to FUNDOM taking Guillermo's place as the mysterious dancer. Víctor sends an e-mail to "Vera" (actually Ana) about the accident. Carmín obtains the evidence she needs to expose Marcos as the mastermind behind the hacking. Alex makes one final move to expose Bia and Manuel's romance.
81	21	Episode 21	13 April 2020
Mariano and Alice are devastated to discover that Bia has been lying about meeting Manuel, causing a serious disagreement between them. Meanwhile, the Fundom people are looking for a way to apologize to Carmín and Marcos will have to face the consequences that came with exposing his lack of ethics as Laix's manager.
82	22	Episode 22	14 April 2020
Furious that her parents won't listen to her, Bia immediately moves to the Kunst Residence, which only angers Mariano further. Daisy becomes mad at Pietro upon finding out that he and Delfi kissed. The FUNDOM people offer Carmín a collaboration on their channel as a way to repay the favor she did for them. Marcos is fired as manager of Laix for his actions, allowing Guillermo to go behind his back and be chosen for the job.
83	23	Episode 23	15 April 2020
Thiago's stepmother, Alana, arrives at the Residence, leaving him nervous and causing him to lash out at the disabled basketball team. Chiara is taken aback by the latest revelation about the mysterious dancer. Mariano, still upset at Bia's lies, makes a discovery about Manuel and Antonio. Pietro tries to tell Daisy how he feels and Ana once again convinces Bia to reconsider her decision.
84	24	Episode 24	16 April 2020
Bia returns home to talk with her parents, but she is still unable to convince them that Manuel is not like his family. Manuel confides to Bia his suspicions about Antonio concealing information about his father. Víctor becomes concerned upon realizing that Bia has his missing sheet music of one of his songs. Alex makes a plan to stall Manuel's investigation about his father.
85	25	Episode 25	17 April 2020
Manuel questions Bia about having punctured Antonio's car tire, leaving her offended and hurt for distrusting her. Carmín gathers the entire FUNDOM for a surprise she has prepared for them. Thiago decides to resign as coach of the basketball team. Pietro and Daisy finally come clean about their feelings and Luan becomes suspicious of Alana.
86	26	Episode 26	20 April 2020
Guided by what Bia mentioned about believing that Victor is hiding something about the accident, Ana begins to recall some memories of the past. Meanwhile, Mara is determined to take revenge on Carmín because of her betrayal to Laix and Guillermo makes a visit to Fundom, proposed to leave the feud created by Marcos behind.
87	27	Episode 27	21 April 2020
The fake video showing Bia puncturing Antonio's car tire begins to have a negative impact on the networks, causing Mariano to decide to face the Gutiérrez family, and in the process, he reveals Antonio's termination from the studio. Meanwhile, Guillermo discovers that Chiara is his secret love and Alana continues to approach the people of the Residence, leaving Thiago increasingly suspicious.
88	28	Episode 28	22 April 2020
Manuel is extremely offended and upset to discover that Bia is suspicious of Víctor's words about the accident. Meanwhile, Thiago decides to re-train the basketball team and Luan reveals to Pixie that he received a great proposal to work in the USA.
89	29	Episode 29	23 April 2020
Being denounced by Antonio, Bia and her parents are taken to the police station to testify about the case. Meanwhile, Antonio offers Alex the opportunity to represent him at Laix and Pixie realizes that what is right is to encourage Luan to follow his dream and accept the job in the USA.
90	30	Episode 30	24 April 2020
Determined not to hide anything from Manuel anymore, Bia again tries to talk to him about her suspicions about Víctor, but the conversation may not go the way she hopes. Meanwhile, Antonio officially becomes Alex's representative, Luan decides to accept the job vacancy in the USA and Víctor finally reveals the truth about the accident to a friend.
91	31	Episode 31	27 April 2020
Realizing that it is increasingly difficult to stay together, Bia and Manuel accept the reality that both are doing harm to each other. Alana manages to complete her plan. Meanwhile, Paula is looking for job opportunities like Personal Training and finds a student with whom, at first, she has a good relationship. Although she is saddened by her decisions, Bia continues to investigate the truth about the accident.
92	32	Episode 32	28 April 2020
Manuel and Bia suffer the consequences from the distance from each other. Manuel seeks information about his father. Pietro realizes that the relationship with his cousin can be more difficult than it seems. Meanwhile, Alana shows Thiago that she is the real owner of the residence, and demands that everyone leave the place immediately. Investigating about the accident, Bia decides to talk to Víctor in order to find out what really happened.
93	33	Episode 33	29 April 2020
Víctor lies to Bia again, but she is more and more certain that he hides something, and everything becomes more intense when Bia and Celeste make a new discovery about the accident. Expelled from the Kunst Residence by Alana, those who live in it, look for a way to resolve the situation. Zeta's dislike makes Daisy suspicious that there is some hurt between him and Pietro. Celeste creates a session on her profile to advise people. During this, Paula discovers that Carmín is Alex's ex-girlfriend and arranges a meeting between them and Mara at her home.
94	34	Episode 34	30 April 2020
Ana and Thiago talk about their feelings. Paula asks Carmín for help, to show Alex that Mara is a bad influence. A photo of Daisy becomes a meme on the internet. Guillermo and Chiara have a romantic date. When Bia is confused by her decision, Manuel asks her to rethink and proposes that she go back.
95	35	Episode 35	1 May 2020
Bia and Manuel talk about their relationship. Due to the bad reputation of certain people from Laix, Chiara reveals what she really thinks about Guillermo. The memes make Daisy very ashamed, so she argues with Zeta and claims to Pietro that technology can affect his cousin's personality. Manuel and Víctor visit their grandmother René, and discover something crucial about their father. Ana's feelings for Thiago are revealed, but his reaction may not be what she expects. Víctor is encouraged to return to the path of music, and Alex encourages him further. Bia reveals to Ana the results of her investigation, which makes her remember the truth about the mystery surrounding the accident. Meanwhile, the identity of the snake is revealed.
96	36	Episode 36	4 May 2020
With nowhere to go, the guys at the Kunst Residence are invited to stay at Fundom. Bia begins to doubt whether Helena was actually driving the car before the accident. Aillén shows Carmín the audios of Mara, and claims that she was to blame for the fall of So Carmín. During all of this, Bia talks to her parents, and they allow Ana and Daisy to stay at her house until the problem with Alana is resolved.
97	37	Episode 37	5 May 2020
Joined by Ana, Pietro and Zeta at Fundom, Thiago is looking for ways to recover the Kunst Residence, and Pixie joins him when asked to restore the contents of a tape found at the residence. Ana reflects on the accident through what she discovered from Bia. Zeta's time spent on the Internet makes Pietro alert and offers help. Manuel talks to his mother about his father. Bia finds a document that concludes one of her suspicions.
98	38	Episode 38	6 May 2020
Due to the consequences that her family suffered, Bia is irritated to learn that Helena was not driving the vehicle at the time of the accident. Ana and Thiago make their feelings for each other clear. With Mara's help, Marcos devises a plan to get Guillermo out of his position with Laix. With Antonio representing him, Alex begins to encounter problems. For all that is going on, Manuel begins to suspect that what Antonio says is true, especially after his mother confirms that she will return to Argentina. Víctor finds out that Antonio is Manuel's father. When comforting Manuel, Bia approaches to tell what she discovered.
99	39	Episode 39	7 May 2020
Anxious for her conversation with Víctor, Bia tries to look for him by all means. Despite being irritated by the I Know What You Did video, Chiara prefers to believe what Guillermo says, and the two end up getting closer. Víctor is undecided to tell Manuel that Antonio is his true father. With Zeta avoiding him, Pietro decides to confiscate his electronics so he can think about his mistakes. Thanks to the help of everyone around him, even from a repented Soledad, Thiago manages to gather enough evidence to retake the Kunst Residence from Alana. Bia tells Ana what she discovered about the accident.
100	40	Episode 40	8 May 2020
With Soledad's affirmations, Thiago manages to recover the Kunst Residence, and when they return, they want to celebrate the achievement with the Flower Power party. When Mara and Alex find out what the boys are planning, they devise a plan to try to get along at the party. Meanwhile, Marcos Golden discovers something that can take him back to his longed-for position. At the Flower Power Party, Alex and Carmín talk about the events and the meeting ends up taking a different course than expected. After the party, Manuel finally meets his mother, who reveals something he has always sought to know and he discover that her father is Antonio. Bia shows one of the accident videos to Ana and the impact reminds her that Lucas was driving the vehicle.
101	41	Episode 41	29 June 2020 (Note: After episode 40, Disney did not confirm whether the season would be divided into parts. However, through the official Instagram they confirmed new episodes from 29 June 2020.) (Note: This episode was originally scheduled to air on 6 July 2020. However, Disney pushed the date back after the episode started airing in Spain on 22 June 2020.)
When Ana realizes that her dreams were memories of the accident, Ana becomes angered with her actions and with Victor's posture. Pietro, Daisy and Pixie talk to Zeta's father about his behaviour. Meanwhile, Manuel demands an explanation from Antonio of the secret he has hidden for so long: he is Manuel's father. Having figured out he is the snake, Marcos blackmails Guillermo into resigning as CEO and, under duress, Guillermo reluctantly agrees and breaks up with Chiara. Upon realizing that Helena did not really drive at the time of the accident, Bia immediately invites Víctor for a conversation and he explains the whole truth about that day, revealing information that Ana had already questioned.
102	42	Episode 42	30 June 2020
Victor asks Bia not to tell Manuel about the accident. Chiara and Guillermo are greatly saddened over their breakup, which leads Guillermo to declare his feelings anonymously in the Box of Secrets of Celeste's profile. Antonio overhears Mara and Alex talking about the bad tactics he is giving to his son on the networks. Upon learning that Ana had informed Bia about what happened the night of the accident, Victor insists on meeting her. Pietro's father appears to visit his son. Angered at the Gutiérrezes, Manuel assumes that Victor is the only one he wants to keep in touch with. Bia tells the truth about the accident to her mother.
103	43	Episode 43	1 July 2020
Perplexed by the truth about the accident, Alice asks Bia not to reveal it to Mariano for now and guarantees that she does not want to react like the Gutiérrezes. The arrival of Pietro's father thrills the Kunst Residence. Victor's delay in revealing what happened the night of the accident to Manuel bothers Bia. The Twin Melody girls tell Marcos Golden that they don't want to collaborate with Mara because of her personality, much to their anger. Alex and Manuel meet and discuss the latest events. When Bia and Alice talk about the accident, Mariano overhears Bia saying that Victor lied to her and questions her.
104	44	Episode 44	2 July 2020
Bia and her mother tell their father the truth about the accident. Manuel and Bia do not hide their feelings for each other. Guillermo tries to talk to Chiara, but ends up hearing her say that she doesn't want to see him anymore. Marcos Golden convinces the Twin Melody to collaborate with Alex. Aillén suspects that Guillermo has taken the pendrive with Mara's audios. Daisy is suspicious of Zeta's rapid change in habits. Alex talks to Carmín who tries to help him with his problems, and ends up revealing that Manuel is his brother.
105	45	Episode 45	3 July 2020
Bia tells her friends that she wants to return to Manuel, but a new video of the snake about Manuel and Carmín threatens her will. Meanwhile, Victor's anxiety about meeting Ana increases after learning that she and Thiago are dating. Bia and Celeste worry and try to help Chiara feel better. Mara is furious with the collaboration of Alex and Twin Melody, while her channel is falling into networks. Mariano wants to talk to the Gutiérrez, but Bia and Alice stop him by saying that this is not the time and it will only further increase the hatred between both families. Pixie alerts Daisy about Zeta's rapid change. Ailén discovers that Guillermo is the snake.
106	46	Episode 46	6 July 2020
The snake video reminds Bia that whenever she is close to Manuel, something tries to keep them away. When she feels the lack of confidence that Alex has in herself, Mara proposes to end their relationship. Upon learning that Fundom's lease is coming to an end, Marcos Golden offers Antonio the proposal to get the property for Laix. Daisy realizes that there is tension between Pietro and his father. Ailén gives Guillermo a second chance and helps him surprise Chiara. Tired of hiding the truth about Manuel's accident, Bia tries to talk to Victor but he ignores her calls, which makes her go to his house.
107	47	Episode 47	7 July 2020
Bia's visit to the Gutiérrez house infuriates Paula. Daisy warns Pietro about Zeta's rapid change, but the head of the residence is very concerned about his father's presence, especially after having a bad grade in a university exam. Alice worries that Bia is constantly thinking about the accident. Marcos' plan to get Fundom, follows Antonio's antics. In collaboration with Bia, Paula and Aitana say goodbye to Fundom. Lucia returns to Spain and says goodbye to her son. When trying to tell Manuel the truth, Victor ends up feeling sick. Alex is increasingly tired of his father as his representative. Milo records a video of Daisy and Ana together, and this makes Ana worried about someone recognizing her.
108	48	Episode 48	8 July 2020
When Bia tries to show Ana and Daisy's video, Milo deletes it at Ana's request, but Alice still wants to meet her. Manuel takes Victor home and Paula apologizes for the way she treated him. Guillermo and Ailén look for the cell phone as the content they send to snake, but it is too late, Marcos takes the smartphone so that Uma can hack it. Pietro tries to speak to his father. Mara and Alex record a collaboration together. Chiara decides to talk to Guillermo. Thiago believes that the time has come for Ana to reveal herself as Helena. Alex tells Paula that he saw Mariano and Antônio arguing. Bia and Manuel meet, and let their feelings speak louder.
109	49	Episode 49	9 July 2020
Ana becomes increasingly nervous with Alice's insistence on meeting her when she invites her over for dinner. Carmín can't hide her feelings for Alex. Paula confronts Antonio for the argument with Mariano, and once again comes up with the same old story. Marcos and Antonio complete their plan to close the FUNDOM for good. Guillermo is lost in what to do with Chiara because of Marcos' blackmail. Víctor finally tells Manuel the truth about the accident, but his reaction may not be as expected.
110	50	Episode 50	10 July 2020
Hurt and betrayed, Manuel is upset with Bia and Víctor and thinks he can no longer trust anyone. Ana decides that it's time for everyone to know the truth about her. The FUNDOM guys are informed by Guillermo about Marcos' plan. Luan returns from USA. Marcos sends the photo of Carmín and Alex's kiss to I Know What You Did and is posted, upsetting Mara and devastating Carmín. Unsure about Zeta's rapid change, Pietro and Daisy follow him to the park and catch him playing on his cellphone, realizing his cousin's deception. Guillermo admits being the snake to Chiara. Manuel resigns himself to the impossibility of his relationship with Bia and breaks up with her.
111	51	Episode 51	13 July 2020
Bia is saddened because of Manuel. Chiara dismisses Guillermo's confession as an excuse for his previous actions. Pietro decides that Zeta will see Alice to help with his problem. Bia and the others fight for the FUNDOM, which is nearing closure. Manuel contemplates on returning to Spain. A heartbroken Mara breaks up with Alex who becomes fed up with Antonio's strategies. Víctor visits the Urquiza residence. Ana asks Bia how would she react if her sister was still alive.
112	52	Episode 52	14 July 2020
Ana is hurt to hear that Bia would not forgive her sister for being absent all these years. In tears, Víctor apologizes to the Urquizas for all the damage he caused due to Antonio's manipulations. Meanwhile, plans to save the FUNDOM from closing are set into motion. Antonio is threatened by Manuel into backing down from Marcos' plan against the FUNDOM. Using the first recording that turned Alex against Bia, Guillermo finally gets Chiara to realize he is the snake. Growing tired of his attitude, Bia confronts Manuel and demands that he stop blaming people for his situation.
113	53	Episode 53	15 July 2020
Despite Bia's best efforts, she is unable to change Manuel's decision. Chiara becomes infuriated at Guillermo for being the snake. They are accidentally overheard by Luan and tells Pixie about it. Antonio tells Manuel he was unable to reverse the FUNDOM's closure. Pietro reconciles with his father. Zeta has a great idea that could save the FUNDOM. Mara posts a video on her channel about Alex's unfaithfulness to further boost her popularity in the networks. Ana, who sends Víctor an e-mail claiming she is not Vera, decides to talk to him first. Angered that he won't listen to him, Alex relieves Antonio from being his representative. Víctor tries to talk to Manuel, yet he still refuses to forgive him for lying about the accident. Bia sees that Ana's hands are similar to her sister's.
114	54	Episode 54	16 July 2020
Víctor promises Manuel to tell the truth and not lie to him ever again. Marcos orders Guillermo to post a video that affects the FUNDOM and he feigns acceptance to plan a strategy. Manuel tells Bia of Antonio's role in closing the FUNDOM and how he threatened to reveal the truth of the accident if he didn't step down. Bia vehemently disagrees with this, partly because it would further fuel the distrust between their families should the accident be used as a corroboration to save the FUNDOM. Marcos reinstates Antonio as Alex's representative and becomes Mara's as well, much to Alex's frustration. After some reluctance, Chiara tells Bia and Celeste about Guillermo being the snake. Víctor records a video dedicating a song to Manuel.
115	55	Episode 55	17 July 2020
Ana prepares to meet Víctor. Despite Víctor's good gesture, Manuel thinks this is not enough to change his mind. Pietro encourages Manuel to forgive him. Alex is furious at his father's decisions. Luan wants to help Zeta. Víctor tells Alex the truth of the accident. Mara finds out Guillermo is the snake, so she records a video to ruin Carmín's reputation but miserably fails. Thiago is concerned that Ana might still harbor feelings for Víctor. Guillermo publicly reveals himself as the snake and ends his schemes, infuriating Marcos. Pixie announces that the owner rejected their offer and the FUNDOM will definitely close. Víctor and Ana finally meet; he recognizes her as Helena.
116	56	Episode 56	20 July 2020
Helena refuses to forgive Víctor for his lies about the accident. Bia encourages the others into finding a new solution for the FUNDOM. Pietro reassures Manuel about what to do with Bia. Víctor's behaviour confuses Paula. On Antonio's insistence, the video of Mara and Carmín's argument is posted. Alex confronts Antonio over concealing the truth of the accident, but does not tell Paula for her own sake. Manuel sees Bia but instead leaves, leaving her disgusted. Guillermo tries to talk to Chiara. Bia and Víctor meet.
117	57	Episode 57	21 July 2020
Víctor can't bring himself to tell Bia that her sister is still alive. Thiago offers the Kunst Residence attic as a new place for the FUNDOM. Chiara still refuses to forgive Guillermo. After taking some time, Manuel finally forgives Víctor. Helena still suffers because of Víctor. To make matters worse, Marcos purchases the FUNDOM, infuriating Manuel and, remembering his threat to Antonio, tries to tell Paula about the accident, though Alex talks him down; he blames Víctor for wrecking the family apart. Mara wants Guillermo's contacts involved with the snake to attack the FUNDOM and he reveals that he has her audios. Bia and Manuel argue again and she makes an insulting comment that offends Manuel. Víctor sees Thiago and Helena kissing and realizes that he has been dating her.
118	58	Episode 58	22 July 2020
Having discovered their relationship, Víctor thinks that Thiago and Helena were playing him all along. Guillermo blackmails Mara into backing down from her plans. Manuel is angered upon hearing Bia say that he is ending up like Antonio; she tries to make him see that he needs help and to stop playing the victim. Luan catches Zeta once again playing with his table. Paula remains suspicious over Víctor's recent behaviour. Aillén contemplates on quitting Laix, having seen through Marcos and Mara's manipulative natures. Thiago announces that the attic will be used for the FUNDOM. Guillermo and Chiara reconcile. Bia and Alex make amends with each other.
119	59	Episode 59	23 July 2020
Manuel confronts Alex for his encounter with Bia. Víctor tells Helena that Bia deserves to know the truth about her. Zeta finally accepts his problem with the screens and apologizes to Pietro. Víctor intends to leave for Spain for a basketball coach assistant offer; Manuel is upset about this. Alex professes his love for Carmín. With the FUNDOM nearing closure, Bia and Manuel casually meet in the spot where they realized each other's identity.
120	60	Episode 60	24 July 2020
Manuel apologizes to Bia for his previous behaviour and they reconcile. Chiara tells Pietro, Daisy, Luan and Pixie that she is dating Guillermo, to their surprise but acceptance. As they bid farewell to the FUNDOM, Bia and the other reminisce about the great times they have spent together there since its opening, with influencers like Kevsho, Sebastián Villalobos, Twin Melody and Delfi sharing their gratitude through a video. The BeUs host a big party named Big Band Fest, with Marcos and Mara, who make fun of Thiago's attempts to save the FUNDOM, in attendance. Víctor is about to leave for Spain. Alex and Carmín admit their feelings for each other. A diviner warns Bia that she is in danger and only a "great love" will be there to save her. Bia hears Helena's voice in a song. As she begins to feel dizzy, Bia falls into a lake and is miraculously saved by Helena. Bia finally recognizes her after a long time of uncertainness and the two share an emotional hug.
