= Benidorm Fest 2023 =

Spanish selection for the Eurovision Song Contest 2023

Dates and venue
- Semi-final 1: 31 January 2023
- Semi-final 2: 2 February 2023
- Final: 4 February 2023
- Venue: Palau Municipal d'Esports l'Illa de Benidorm (Benidorm, Valencian Community, Spain)

Organisation
- Broadcaster: Radiotelevisión Española (RTVE)
- Executive supervisors: María Eizaguirre; Eva Mora
- Presenters: Mónica Naranjo; Inés Hernand; Rodrigo Vázquez

Participants
- Number of entries: 18

Vote
- Winning song: "Eaea" by Blanca Paloma

Benidorm Fest 2023 was the second edition of the annual Benidorm Fest, a television song contest held in Benidorm, organised and broadcast by Radiotelevisión Española (RTVE). The show was held between 31 January and 4 February 2023, and was hosted by Mónica Naranjo, Inés Hernand and Rodrigo Vázquez. The winner of the competition was "Eaea" performed by Blanca Paloma, who represented Spain in the Eurovision Song Contest 2023, finishing 17th in the grand final.

== Format ==
The competition consisted of two semi-finals and one final. In total, 18 candidate songs competed divided between the two semifinals, that is, nine participated in each one. In each semifinal, the four songs with the most votes among the professional juries (50%), the demographic panel (25%) and the televote (25%), went directly to the final. During the final, the eight qualified songs were performed again to determine which would represent Spain in the Eurovision Song Contest 2023, following the same voting system as in the semi-finals.

=== Presenters ===
On 19 July 2022, RTVE announced singer Mónica Naranjo as the main host of Benidorm Fest 2023. Naranjo was accompanied by Internet personality and comedian Inés Hernand, who returned to serve as co-host, and journalist and television presenter Rodrigo Vázquez.

=== Expert jury members ===
On 19 July 2022, RTVE announced that the expert jury panel would be headed by composer, musician and record producer Nacho Cano. It was also announced that Swedish singer and television producer Christer Björkman would be among the international members of the expert jury. On 25 January 2023, RTVE announced the full eight-member jury line-up, with five international members and three national members. It was also announced that Cano would not be part of the jury as initially announced, citing professional scheduling reasons.

Member	Occupation(s)
Christer Björkman	Swedish singer and television producer; Swedish representative in the Eurovision Song Contest 1992; Contest Producer of Melodifestivalen (2002–2021); Producer of the Eurovision Song Contest in 2013, 2016, 2017 and 2019
Tali Eshkoli	Israeli television producer, Coordinator of the Eurovision Song Contest 2019
Nicola Caligiore	Head of the Italian delegation at Eurovision (2011–2019)
Katrina Leskanich	American singer and musician, winner of the Eurovision Song Contest 1997 as part of Katrina and the Waves
William Lee Adams	Journalist, founder and editor of Wiwibloggs
Nina	Singer and actress, Spanish representative in the Eurovision Song Contest 1989
Irene Valiente	Journalist, program director at Radio 3
José Juan Santana	Composer, President of OGAE Spain

=== Guest performers ===
Information about the guest performers was revealed during the Benidorm Fest week.

The first semi-final was opened by presenter Mónica Naranjo performing "Diva". The intervals acts included Leo Rizzi performing "Arcade", and Edurne, who represented Spain in the Eurovision Song Contest 2015, performing "Boomerang", "Te quedaste solo" and "Amores dormidos".

The second semi-final was opened by Miguel Poveda performing "Eres tú", while the interval featured Álvaro Soler performing "Candela", and Gloria Trevi performing "Gloria" and "Todos Me Miran".

The final was opened by Manuel Carrasco performing "Eres". The interval acts included presenter Mónica Naranjo performing her song "Sobreviviré", and Ana Mena performing "Un clásico" and "Las 12". In addition, previous winner Chanel made an appearance to hand the trophy to her successor.

== Competing entries ==
RTVE published the rules and regulations for Benidorm Fest 2023 on 19 July 2022. The submission period opened on 1 September 2022, with the window closing on 10 October 2022. In addition to the open submission, RTVE reserved the right to invite renowned singers and authors from the current music scene directly. Upon closing the submission period, RTVE announced that 876 entries had been received, 482 by the online form and 394 by record labels.

The names of the chosen contestants were officially announced by RTVE on 25 October 2022, in a special broadcast on La 1 hosted by Inés Hernand, followed by a presentation event on 29 October, hosted by Julia Varela and Rodrigo Vázquez also on La 1. Among the competing artists is Blanca Paloma, who participated in 2022. The competing songs were released on RTVE Play and RTVE's website on 18 December 2022.

Selected entries and their scores in the selection procedure
Artist	Song	Composer(s)	Points	Place
Agoney	"Quiero arder"	Agoney Hernández Morales, Andrés Huélamo López, Marta Martínez López	65	16
Alfred García	"Desde que tú estás"	Alfred García Castillo, Raúl Gómez	99	6
Alice Wonder	"Yo quisiera"	Alicia Climent Barriuso	125	2
Aritz	"Flamenco"	Carlos Marco, Frida Amundsen, Kaci Brown, Sam Gray, Tonino Speciale	146	1
Blanca Paloma	"Eaea"	Álvaro Tato, Blanca Paloma Ramos, José Pablo Polo	101	4
E'Femme	"Uff!"	Antonio Escobar Núñez, Bárbara Reyzábal, Carlota Sotelo Martínez, Melania Medel González, Sandra Martin Valencia, Sara Frías López	91	7
Famous	"La Lola"	Adrián Ghiardo, Andrés Sebastián Ramírez, Jorge de la Cruz Correa	81	10
Fusa Nocta	"Mi familia"	Carlos Padilla, Ignacio Moreno González, Luis Nares Signes, Miriam Nares Signes, Rosebely Molina, Teresa de la Gándara, Vera Martí Nares	79	12
José Otero	"Inviernos en Marte"	Gabriel Oré Lapides, José Andrés Otero Pérez, Karen Méndez, Kenya Saiz Gallo, Manuel Chalud	110	3
Karmento	"Quiero y duelo"	Carmen Toledo	55	18
Megara	"Arcadia"	Israel Dante Ramos, Roberto La Lueta Ruíz, Sara Jiménez Moral	87	9
Meler	"No nos moverán"	Francisco Javier Pagalday González, Jonathan Geraint Burt, José Héctor Portilla Rodríguez, Natalia Neva Martín, Oliver García Cerón	89	8
Rakky Ripper	"Tracción"	Aleix Martin Font, Joan Valls Paniza, Raquel García Cabrerizo, Rubén Pérez Pérez	76	14
Sharonne	"Aire"	Alejandro Barroso Soto, Cristóbal Garrido Pinto, Iván Torrent Llavero	66	15
Siderland	"Que esclati tot"	Albert Sort Creus, Andreu Mañós Ramis, Oriol Plana Pedret, Roger Argemí Tutusaus	64	17
Sofía Martín	"Tuki"	Claudio Maselli, Fanny Sofía Carabias Martín, Freddy Rochow	79	11
Twin Melody	"Sayonara"	Aitana Echeverría, Fernando Boix, Jonathan Geraint Burt, Natalia Neva Martín, Paula Echeverría	99	5
Vicco	"Nochentera"	Joan Valls Paniza, Rubén Pérez Pérez, Victoria Riba	78	13

== Semi-finals ==
The two semi-finals were held on 31 January and 2 February 2023. The running order of the semi-finals, which was decided by the organizers, was revealed on the day of each of the shows.

=== Semi-final 1 ===
The first semi-final took place on 31 January 2023. Agoney, Alice Wonder, Fusa Nocta, and Megara qualified for the final. A total of 10,285 televotes were received during the semi-final, including 7,507 via SMS and 2,778 via phone call.

Semi-final 1 – 31 January 2023
R/O	Artist	Song	Expert jury	Demoscopic jury	Televote	Total	Place
1	Sharonne	"Aire"	45	20	22	87	6
2	Aritz	"Flamenco"	50	22	35	107	5
3	Sofía Martín	"Tuki"	22	13	13	48	9
4	Agoney	"Quiero arder"	86	35	40	161	1
5	Megara	"Arcadia"	51	30	30	111	4
6	Alice Wonder	"Yo quisiera"	79	15	25	119	2
7	Meler	"No nos moverán"	29	40	15	84	7
8	Fusa Nocta	"Mi familia"	65	25	28	118	3
9	Twin Melody	"Sayonara"	29	28	20	77	8

=== Semi-final 2 ===
The second semi-final took place on 2 February 2023. Blanca Paloma, José Otero, Karmento, and Vicco qualified for the final. A total of 11,224 televotes were received during the semi-final, including 7,808 via SMS and 3,416 via phone call.

Semi-final 2 – 2 February 2023
R/O	Artist	Song	Expert jury	Demoscopic jury	Televote	Total	Place
1	Famous	"La Lola"	46	28	13	87	7
2	José Otero	"Inviernos en Marte"	63	22	20	105	4
3	Karmento	"Quiero y duelo"	47	30	35	112	3
4	Rakky Ripper	"Tracción"	24	13	15	52	9
5	Blanca Paloma	"Eaea"	92	35	40	167	1
6	E’Femme	"Uff!"	17	25	22	64	8
7	Siderland	"Que esclati tot"	48	15	25	88	6
8	Alfred García	"Desde que tú estás"	52	20	30	102	5
9	Vicco	"Nochentera"	67	40	28	135	2

== Final ==
The final took place on 4 February 2023. The running order of the final was decided by a draw held on 3 February 2023. A total of 34,997 televotes were received during the final, including 24,553 via SMS and 10,444 via phone call.

R/O	Artist	Song	Expert jury	Demoscopic jury	Televote		Total	Place
R/O	Artist	Song	Expert jury	Demoscopic jury	Votes	Points	Total	Place
1	Karmento	"Quiero y duelo"	35	20	2,371	25	80	6
2	Megara	"Arcadia"	50	28	2,908	28	106	4
3	Alice Wonder	"Yo quisiera"	53	16	1,543	20	89	5
4	Fusa Nocta	"Mi familia"	24	25	1,755	22	71	8
5	Agoney	"Quiero arder"	80	30	9,515	35	145	2
6	Blanca Paloma	"Eaea"	94	35	9,898	40	169	1
7	José Otero	"Inviernos en Marte"	37	22	977	16	75	7
8	Vicco	"Nochentera"	59	40	6,030	30	129	3

== Ratings ==
Viewing figures by show
Show	Air date	Viewers (millions)	Share (%)
Semi-final 1	31 January 2023	1.044	10%
Semi-final 2	2 February 2023	1.020	9.4%
Final	4 February 2023	1.887	14.7%

== Reception ==
=== TV awards ===
Benidorm Fest 2023 was presented with a special prize at the annual Premios Ondas on 18 October 2023.
