= Eaea =

2022 song by Blanca Paloma

Single by Blanca Paloma
- Language: Spanish
- Released: 20 December 2022
- Genre: New flamenco
- Length: 2:59
- Label: Universal
- Songwriters: Blanca Paloma Ramos; José Pablo Polo; Álvaro Tato
- Producer: José Pablo Polo

Blanca Paloma singles chronology
"Niña de fuego" (2022)	"Eaea" (2022)	"Plumas de nácar" (2023)

Music video
- "Eaea" on YouTube

Eurovision Song Contest 2023 entry
- Country: Spain
- Artist: Blanca Paloma
- Languages: Spanish
- Composers: Blanca Paloma Ramos; José Pablo Polo
- Lyricists: Blanca Paloma Ramos; José Pablo Polo; Álvaro Tato

Finals performance
- Final result: 17th
- Final points: 100

Entry chronology
- ◄ "SloMo" (2022)
- "Zorra" (2024) ►

Official performance video
- "Eaea" (Grand Final) on YouTube

"Eaea" (IPA: [eːäeːä]) is a song by Spanish singer Blanca Paloma. The song was co-written by Blanca Paloma alongside José Pablo Polo and Álvaro Tato, with Polo serving as the song's solo producer. It was released on 20 December 2022 through Universal. The song represented Spain in the Eurovision Song Contest 2023, where it finished in 17th at the final with 100 points.

"Eaea" is described as a new flamenco lullaby that serves as a tribute an ode to Blanca Paloma's grandmother, Carmen, and the culture of the Spanish region of Andalusia. The song drew largely positive reception from both Spanish and international critics for its flamenco elements, Blanca Paloma's vocal abilities, and its unique musical nature.

== Background and composition ==
"Eaea" was written by Blanca Paloma, José Pablo Polo, and Álvaro Tato. The song is described as an "honour" to the singer's roots, as a "celebration of female ancestors' power and strength" and "a chant" to Blanca Paloma's grandmother Carmen, who having introduced her to flamenco, heavily inspired the song as well as much of Blanca Paloma's music. The song and its accompanying dance performance features the "nurturing" of traditional Spanish sounds and flamenco styles. It also features "flamenco handclaps", syncopated beats, and Arabic vocal lines "underscored with a pulsating synth line", fused with international elements which reflect Blanca Paloma's "trademark style" of mixing traditional musical elements with aspects of avant-garde and modern pop.

With the song being heavily inspired by Carmen, it features various cultural aspects of Andalusian life, and is described as a lullaby in reference to both lyrics and composition. According to Blanca Paloma, she first thought of writing the new flamenco song during a trip to a flamenco dance school at the Antón Martín market in Madrid. In interviews, Blanca Paloma stated that she wrote "Eaea" as a tribute to Carmen's love towards her, taking inspiration from an Andalusian lullaby that mocked death, which Carmen used to sing to her. She later added in an El Mundo interview that the song was meant to "fill the void" of Carmen's memory when she died. The single's artwork features a photograph of Carmen, and a "representation of the power and strength" of Blanca Paloma's female ancestors is expressed via the performances' accompanying backing vocalists and dancers.

When initially applying to Benidorm Fest 2023, Blanca Paloma sent two songs: "Eaea" and "Plumas de nácar", with Spanish broadcaster Radiotelevisión Española (RTVE) choosing the former to compete in the competition. The song officially premiered on 18 December 2022 alongside all other Benidorm Fest 2023 songs and was released on streaming platforms two days later. (Note: This acts as a summary of all versions of the song released for digital download. (Note: Citations regarding the digital download release of "Eaea" in various countries: "Eaea - Song by Blanca Paloma". Apple Music (DE). 20 December 2022.; "Eaea - Song by Blanca Paloma on Apple Music". Apple Music (GB). 20 December 2022.; "Eaea - Song by Blanca Paloma". Apple Music (US). 20 December 2022. Archived from the original on 8 March 2023.; "Eaea - Song by Blanca Paloma on Apple Music". Apple Music (TR). 20 December 2022. Archived from the original on 6 July 2023.))

== Music video and promotion ==
Along with the song's release, an accompanying music video directed by Angel Pastana was released on 9 March 2023, featuring five dancers: Paloma Scharfhausen, Angélica Moyano, Paula Valbuena, Paula Gironi, and Amanda Nóbrega. The video featured a similar atmosphere to Blanca Paloma's performance at Benidorm Fest 2023, with the video featuring the addition of chairs. For Blanca Paloma, her standing up after sitting down from a chair represented to Blanca Paloma that "when I first started singing in front of a crowd, I did it while sitting because I didn't feel bold enough to do it while standing. Getting up from that chair represents the moment of claiming up my space as an artist." The video also includes the addition of a shot of Blanca Paloma surrounded by approximately 300 candles; in an analysis from La Vanguardia's Monica Paredes, the inclusion of candles represented "a way of invoking our ancestors and creating a women's rite".

To further promote the song, Blanca Paloma announced her intent to perform at various Eurovision pre-parties before the contest during the months of March and April, including the Barcelona Eurovision Party on 25 March, Israel Calling on 3 April, Pre-Party ES 2023 on 8 April, Eurovision in Concert on 15 April, and the London Eurovision Party on 16 April. She also made various appearance on television shows and art exhibitions, performing a specialized version of "Eaea" on Spanish talk show El Hormiguero on 14 February and acoustic versions of the song during the ARCO art show on 23 February and the Portuguese national final for Eurovision 2023, Festival da Canção 2023, on 25 February.

== Critical reception ==
=== Spanish media and personalities ===
In Spain, reactions to "Eaea" were mostly positive. El Mundo's Eduardo Álvarez wrote that while the song allowed Blanca Paloma to showcase her "vocal brilliance", he admitted that the song would only appeal to juries. El País' Carlos Marcos compared Blanca Paloma's song to those of María José Llergo, describing it as "an interesting piece that brings cante jondo closer to electronic sound, creating an atmosphere with Lorca-esque connotations". He also added that Blanca Paloma sung "wonderfully". The Conversation's José Luis Panea praised the song for its unusual nature, stating that the song was "an opportunity to take advantage of [Eurovision] and for professionals in the artistic field to contribute to creating suggestive and avant-garde imagery on public television, beyond the mainstream trends we are so accustomed to consuming". Spanish representative for Eurovision 2022, Chanel Terrero, stated that she saw Blanca Paloma to be "very prepared... we have a chance of winning and I hope [it happens]".

=== International and Eurovision-related media ===
Amongst international media, reception was consistently positive. In a Wiwibloggs review containing reviews from several critics, the song was rated 8.17 out of 10 points, coming fourth out of 37 songs on the site's annual ranking. Vulture's Jon O'Brien ranked the song 17th overall, describing it as an "aggressively Spanish" song, praising Blanca Paloma's vocal abilities and stage presence. Another three Vulture editors consisting of Charlie Harding, Nate Sloan, and Reanna Cruz all praised the song's connections to Spanish culture and flamenco, writing that the song was musically complex. ESC Beat's Doron Lahav ranked the song first overall out of the 37 entries competing in Eurovision 2023, writing that Blanca Paloma had "very impressive vocal ability" that "put me to tears this year".

BBC News' Mark Savage called the song as "one of the most musically intriguing entries" of Eurovision 2023, predicting a top three finish in the contest while adding that "a lot will ride on how Blanca Paloma's melismatic vocal performance can be recreated live". The Guardian's Ben Beaumont–Thomas included the song in his "14 songs to listen out for at Eurovision 2023" list, describing it as "bold and engaging... the song wraps around you like a fluttering bolt of cloth". He later added that Blanca Paloma's vocal abilities featured "this year's most interesting vocal timbre". i's Anna Bonet ranked it tenth out of the 26 finalists in Eurovision 2023, writing that the song was "bold, and bound to be divisive". The Times' Ed Potten ranked the song fourth out of the 26 finalists, ranking it four out of five stars and described the song as "gratifyingly original".

== Eurovision Song Contest ==
=== Benidorm Fest 2023 ===
Radiotelevisión Española (RTVE) organised an 18-song competition titled Benidorm Fest 2023 in order to select its entry for the Eurovision Song Contest 2023. The competition was split into two rounds: the first round featured two, nine-song semi-finals on 31 January and 2 February, with the highest four placing songs from each semi-final advancing to an eight-song grand final on 4 February. In all rounds, the voting system was determined by a 50/25/25 split of professional juries, a demographic panel, and a televote, respectively.

"Eaea" was drawn to perform fifth in the second semi-final. For its Benidorm Fest performance, Blanca Paloma wore an asymmetrical red top, black strips that covered the majority of her left arm, and white leather pants. The staging featured red hanging fringes, which was a tribute to the clothing style of Blanca Paloma's grandmother displayed on the cover artwork of "Eaea". Blanca Paloma is accompanied by three background dancers consisting of Angélica Moyano, Paula Valbuena, and Paloma Fernández, and two backing vocalists consisting of Desiré Paredes and Saray Frutos. The six performers are described by Blanca Paloma to be performing "a rite of invocation, of trance, of catharsis, where somehow we connect with our ancestors, with the strength they have left each one of us".

The song qualified from the second semi-final, coming in first with 167 points. "Eaea" was later drawn to perform sixth in the grand final. After the final results were announced, the song was revealed to have won the competition. "Eaea" finished first in the expert jury with 94 points, second in the demoscopic jury with 35 points, and first in the televote with 40. The combined total of 169 points was 24 more than the runner-up, "Quiero arder" by Agoney.

=== At Eurovision ===
The Eurovision Song Contest 2023 took place at the Liverpool Arena in Liverpool, United Kingdom, and consisted of two semi-finals held on the respective dates of 9 and 11 May, and the final on 13 May 2023. As Spain was a member of the contest's main sponsoring countries the "Big Five", "Eaea" automatically qualified for the grand final. It was drawn to perform eighth in the final, ahead of Cyprus' "Break a Broken Heart" by Andrew Lambrou and before Sweden's "Tattoo" by Loreen.

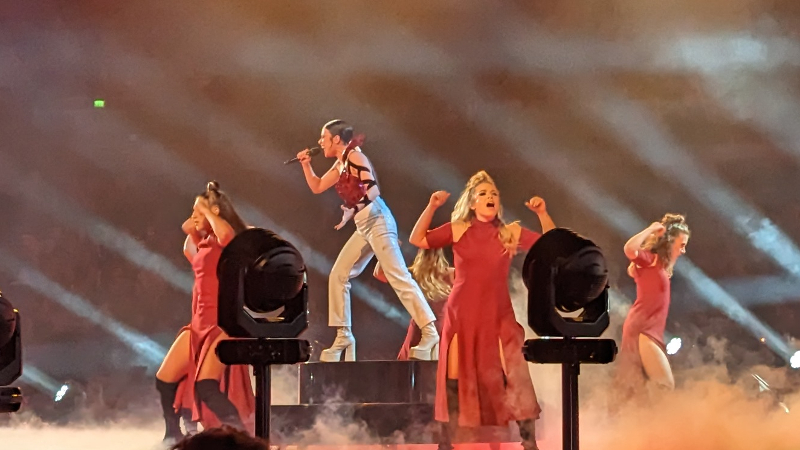
Blanca Paloma performing "Eaea" at a Eurovision semi-final jury show.

The Eurovision performance included tweaks to "elevate the song to a higher status". The staging remained largely similar to the Benidorm Fest version, with slight changes to camera angles and lighting being made to accommodate for the Eurovision stage. The red curtains, which were hanged from the roof during the Benidorm Fest performance, was now instead made transportable and movable. Blanca Paloma wore an outfit designed by Paola de Diego and Raúl Amor that was made to look like an archer; according to El Mundo, the costume cost €12,650.

The performance received mixed reactions. The Independent's Mark Beaumont described it as "a breathtaking performance that breaks innumerable Eurovision rules." El País' Mariola Cubells stated, "Blanca Paloma did such a powerful performance, very dignified and very worked for. And we have to value the effort put into the performance being for TV, which was hard enough, was good." Another writer for El País, Carlos Marcos, wrote that "Blanca Paloma had a powerful weapon: a huge, deep, pinching voice. Her interpretation was remarkable and the staging attractive without overdoing it." In contrast, Mara Maionchi, commentator for the Italian broadcaster RAI, heavily criticised Blanca Paloma's vocals during her performance, comparing them to "a lullaby, but the child won't sleep anymore because she screams... too much [like a madwoman]".

After the results were announced, the entry finished in 17th out of 26 finalists with 100 points, with a split score of ninth rank from 95 jury points and 26th last from five televoting points. The song received no sets of 12 points. Regarding the former, the highest given was a set of ten points by Portugal. In televoting, the highest score given was a set of three points, also given by Portugal. In response to her result, Blanca Paloma stated that she thought the finish was due to not "connect[ing] to as many people as we'd imagined". She later stated to ABC that "I am happy with the execution. It was risky. I want to encourage people not to stop taking risks with different proposals." El Mundo's Eduardo Álvarez declared in response to the result that "[she] did not deserve those shameful five points from the televote... However, Blanca Paloma has allowed us to dream in recent days to conquer the top of the podium".

== Charts ==
Chart performance for "Eaea"
Chart (2023)	Peak position
Lithuania (AGATA)	67

== Release history ==
Release history and formats for "Eaea"
Country	Version	Date	Format(s)	Label	Ref.
Various	Original	20 December 2022	Digital download; streaming	Universal	
