= Teresinha Landeiro =

Portuguese singer (born 1996)

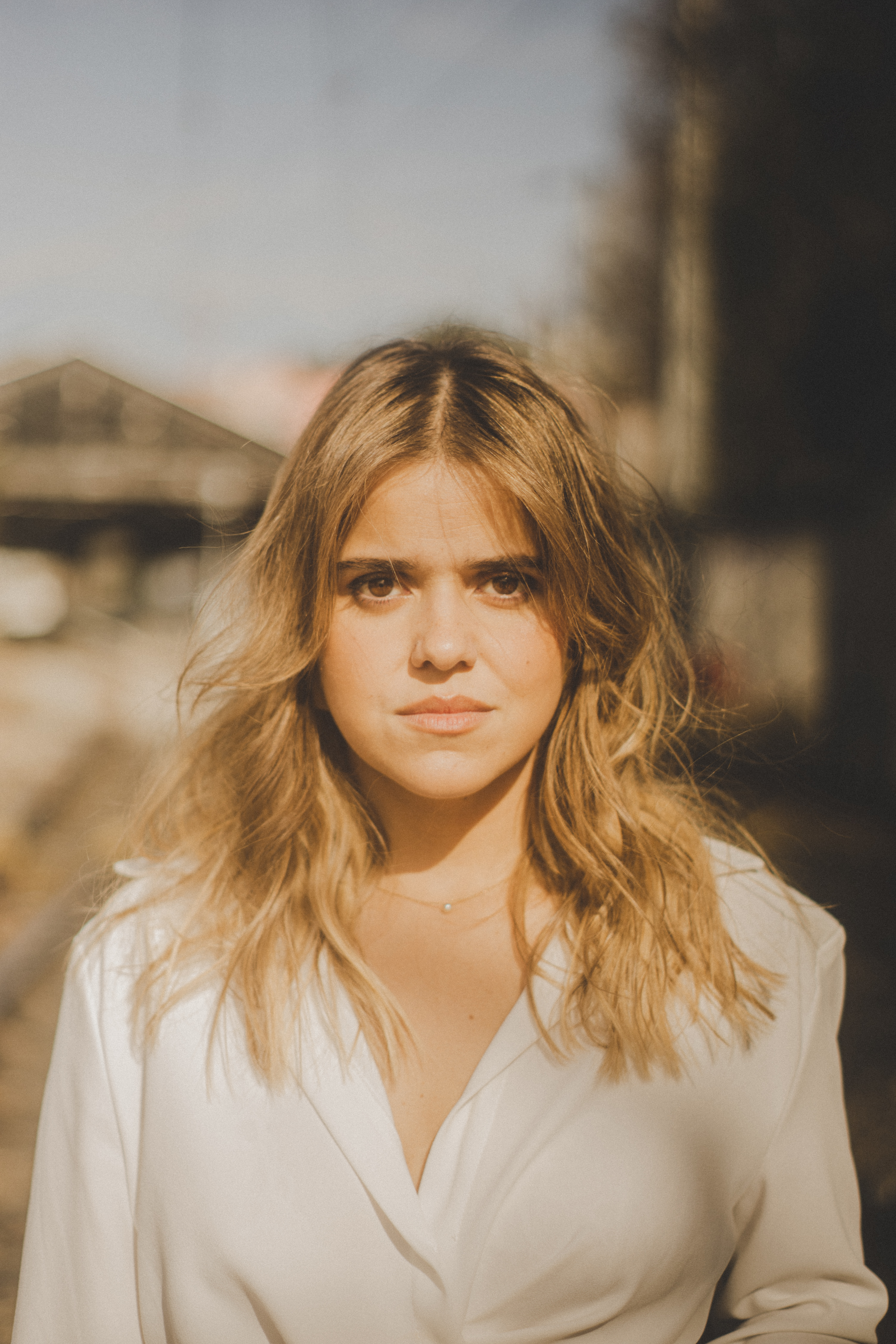
- Landeiro in 2022

Background information
- Born: Teresa Ildefonso Landeiro Lopes; 6 March 1996 (age 30); Azeitão, Setúbal, Portugal
- Genres: Fado
- Occupation: Singer
- Instrument: Vocals
- Years active: 2008–present
- Label: Sony Music Entertainment Portugal

Teresa Ildefonso Landeiro Lopes (born 6 March 1996), known professionally as Teresinha Landeiro, is a Portuguese fado singer.

== Biography ==
Teresinha Landeiro was born on 6 March 1996, in Azeitão, Setúbal, Portugal. She started singing at the age of 12, performing at fado music events. In 2008, Landeiro performed at the Grande Noite do Fado and took part in various competitions focused on Portuguese popular music, winning first prize at the Amador de Odivelas and ACOF Fado competitions. In 2012, she gave her first solo concert at the Ritz Club in Lisbon. In 2014, Portuguese President, Aníbal Cavaco Silva, invited her to participate in the Commemorations of Portugal Day (June 10), which took place in Guarda.

Landeiro was discovered by Sony Music Entertainment Portugal, and in 2018, she released her debut album Namoro, which reached number 6 on the Portuguese sales chart. In 2021, her second album, Agora, was released, which charted at 15th place. In January 2023, she was confirmed among the 20 participants in the Festival da Canção 2023, a music festival used to select Portugal's representative in the Eurovision Song Contest. She presented the unreleased song Enquanto é tempo, without being able to qualify for the final.

== Discography ==
=== Studio albums ===
- 2018 – Namoro
- 2021 – Agora

=== Singles ===
- 2018 – Santo António traiçoeiro (Fado fininho)
- 2018 – Teus olhos nos meus (Fado perseguição)
- 2019 – Apenas sombra
- 2021 – O tempo
- 2021 – Amanhã
- 2022 – A lei da recompensa (featuring Salvador Sobral)
