= Haritz =

Haritz is a Spanish masculine given name and a non-Spanish surname. Notable people with the name include:

== Surname ==
- Günter Haritz (1948–2025), German road and track cyclist

== Given name ==
- Haritz Albisua (born 1992), Spanish footballer
- Haritz Mújika (born 1981), Spanish footballer
- Haritz Zunzunegui (born 1975), Spanish cross-country skier

== See also ==
- Aritz, Basque given name
- Haaretz, Israeli daily newspaper
