= Vicco (singer) =

Spanish singer (born 1995)

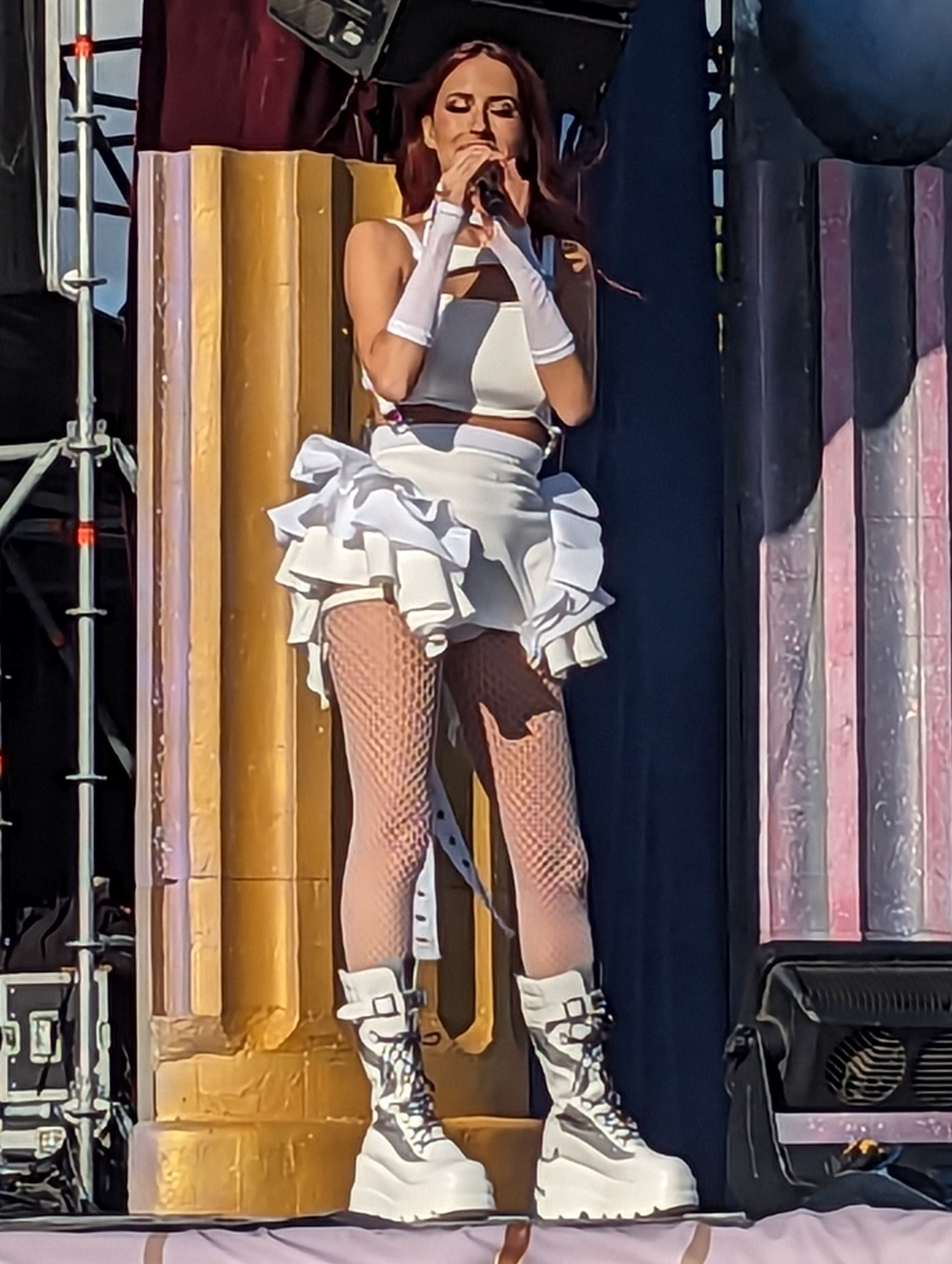

Background information
- Born: Victòria Riba Muns; 10 March 1995 (age 31); Tiana, Catalonia, Spain
- Genres: Latin pop; electropop; reggaeton
- Occupations: Singer; songwriter; record producer
- Years active: 2015–present
- Label: Sony Music

Victòria Riba Muns (Catalan: [bikˈtɔɾi.ə ˈriβə ˈmuns]; born 10 March 1995), known professionally as Vicco (Catalan: [ˈbiku], Spanish: [ˈbiko]), is a Spanish singer, songwriter, and record producer. She participated in the Benidorm Fest 2023 with the song "Nochentera", placing third in the final. Subsequently, the single has been certified octuple platinum and reached fifth position on the Spanish music chart.

== Early life ==
Riba grew up in a musical environment, with her mother being a former singer and her father an amateurish bass guitar player, both encouraging her to explore the discipline. She learned how to play the piano and compose at 9 years old. At the age of 11, she began singing, and by age 15, she started to do both at the same time.

== Career ==
Vicco began her musical career at the age of 19. Before becoming a solo artist, she and her sisters formed the music group Carpanta, which sang in celebrations and shared the lyrics on social media networks. She has participated twice in La Marató de TV3 with the song "Qué boig el món" with Carlos Gómez, the singer of Lexu's, in 2014, and with "Llum de la vida" with Mariona Castillo and the Cor Jove de l'Orfeó Català, in 2019.

On 26 October 2022, it was announced that Vicco would participate in Benidorm Fest 2023, which was held to select Spain's candidate for the Eurovision Song Contest 2023. She received quite a bit of support in the semi-final and qualified for the final as the second highest-scoring entry of the night. In addition, her proposal Nochentera was the most listened to song on Spotify of all the songs of the edition; at the time, it already had streamed more than one and a half million times, as well as being the most searched on Shazam and the most used on TikTok. Therefore, the Tiana City Council organized the viewing of the final live at Sala Albéniz, in the same municipality. In the end, however, Vicco came third place, with 129 points in the final, behind Blanca Paloma and Agoney. In the months following the contest, the song peaked at number five at the Spanish Singles Chart and obtained an octuple platinum certification by Promusicae.

On 24 April 2024, through her social media networks, Vicco announced the title of her first studio album, entitled Noctalgia. The album went on sale on 10 May.

In October 2026, she was announced as a participant of Benidorm Fest 2027.

== Personal life ==
Vicco is the second cousin of singer Edu Esteve. She has been dating Valencian multidisciplinary artist Sazza since at least 2022 and they live together in Madrid.

== Discography ==
=== Studio albums ===
List of studio albums, with selected details
Title	Details
Noctalgia	Released: 10 May 2024; Label: Sony Music; Formats: CD, digital download, streaming

=== EPs ===
List of EPs, with selected details
Title	Details
No Me Atrevo	Released: 17 April 2020; Label: Sony Music; Formats: CD, digital download, streaming

=== Singles ===
As lead artist
Year	Title	Peak chart positions				Certifications	Album
Year	Title	SPA	ARG	PAR	PER	Certifications	Album
2020	"Por las calles"	—	—	—	—		Non-album singles
2020	"Un trago de ti" (with Suu)	—	—	—	—	PROMUSICAE: Gold	Non-album singles
2020	"Con mucho gusto" (with Bejo)	—	—	—	—		Non-album singles
2020	"TEDM"	—	—	—	—		Non-album singles
2021	"Quédate"	—	—	—	—		Non-album singles
2021	"Puedes contar conmigo"	—	—	—	—		Non-album singles
2021	"Autocine" (with Emlan)	—	—	—	—		Non-album singles
2022	"Memoria de pez"	—	—	—	—		Non-album singles
2022	"Nochentera" (solo or remix with Lali)	5	— (Note: "Nochentera (Remix)" did not enter the Billboard Argentina Hot 100 but it peaked in 12th place in the Top 20 General Argentina of Monitor Latino.)	71	13	PROMUSICAE: 9× Platinum	Noctalgia
2023	"Me muero x ti"	—	—	—	—		Noctalgia
2023	"Todo me da igual"	—	—	—	—		Noctalgia
2023	"Te quiero" (with Abraham Mateo)	87	—	—	—	PROMUSICAE: Gold	Noctalgia
2024	"La vuelta al mundo"	—	—	—	—		Noctalgia
"—" denotes a recording that did not chart or was not released.

Promotional singles
Year	Title	Album
2024	"Como Britney"	Noctalgia
2024	"Sorteo"	Noctalgia
