= Aritz =

Male given name

- Gender: Male
- Language: Basque

Origin
- Meaning: oak
- Region of origin: Basque Country

Other names
- Related names: Haritz

Aritz is a Basque masculine given name meaning "oak".

== People ==
- Aritz Aduriz (born 1981), Spanish footballer
- Aritz Aldasoro (born 1999), Spanish footballer
- Aritz Arambarri (born 1998), Spanish footballer
- Aritz Aranburu (born 1985), Spanish surfer
- Aritz Bagües (born 1989), Spanish cyclist
- Aritz Borda (born 1985), Spanish footballer
- Aritz Elustondo (born 1994), Spanish footballer
- Aritz López Garai (born 1980), Spanish footballer
- Aritz Maestu (born 1990), Spanish figure skater
- Aritz Mendiola (born 1998), Spanish actor and singer
- Aritz Moreno (born 1980), Spanish filmmaker
