= The Happy Mess =

Portuguese music band

- Origin: Portugal
- Genres: Indie pop
- Years active: 2011–present
- Label: Sony Music Entertainment Portugal
- Members: Miguel Ribeiro; Joana Duarte; Zé Vieira; João Pascoal; Alfonso Carvalho; Hugo Azevedo

The Happy Mess is a Portuguese indie pop band founded in 2011. The band consists of singer and guitarist Miguel Ribeiro, singer and keyboardist Joana Duarte, guitarist Zé Vieira, bassist João Pascoal, keyboardist and pianist Rui Manuel Costa and drummer Hugo Azevedo. Throughout their career, The Happy Mess have performed on both national stages, touring Portugal, and internationally, such as the Eurosonic festival in the Netherlands.

== Career ==
The Happy Mess was formed in 2011 and soon began releasing music with the release of their debut EP October Sessions. Three years later, they released their debut album Songs from the Backyard. In 2015, their second album Half Fiction gave them their first entry into the Portuguese sales chart entering the 20th place, beaten in 2018 by their follow-up album Dear Future, which reached the 14th position.

In January 2023, The Happy Mess were confirmed among the 20 participants in the Festival da Canção, a review used to select Portugal's representative in the Eurovision Song Contest. They presented the unreleased O impossível, but they did not qualify for the final.

== Discography ==
=== Studio albums ===
- 2013 – Songs from the Backyard
- 2015 – Half Fiction
- 2018 – Dear Future
- 2021 – Jardim da Parada
- 2024 – Horas Dias Meses Anos

=== EP ===
- 2011 – October Sessions

=== Singles ===
- 2012 – Morning Sun
- 2013 – Backyard Girl
- 2013 – Homeland
- 2015 – The Invisible Boy
- 2016 – Revolução ao espelho
- 2017 – Love Is a Strange Thing
- 2018 – Waltz for Lovers (feat. Rita Redshoes)
- 2018 – Long Goodbye
- 2021 – Perder o pé
- 2021 – Nadar de costas
- 2021 – Alguma coisa va mudar
