= You Can't Win, Charlie Brown =

Portuguese rock band

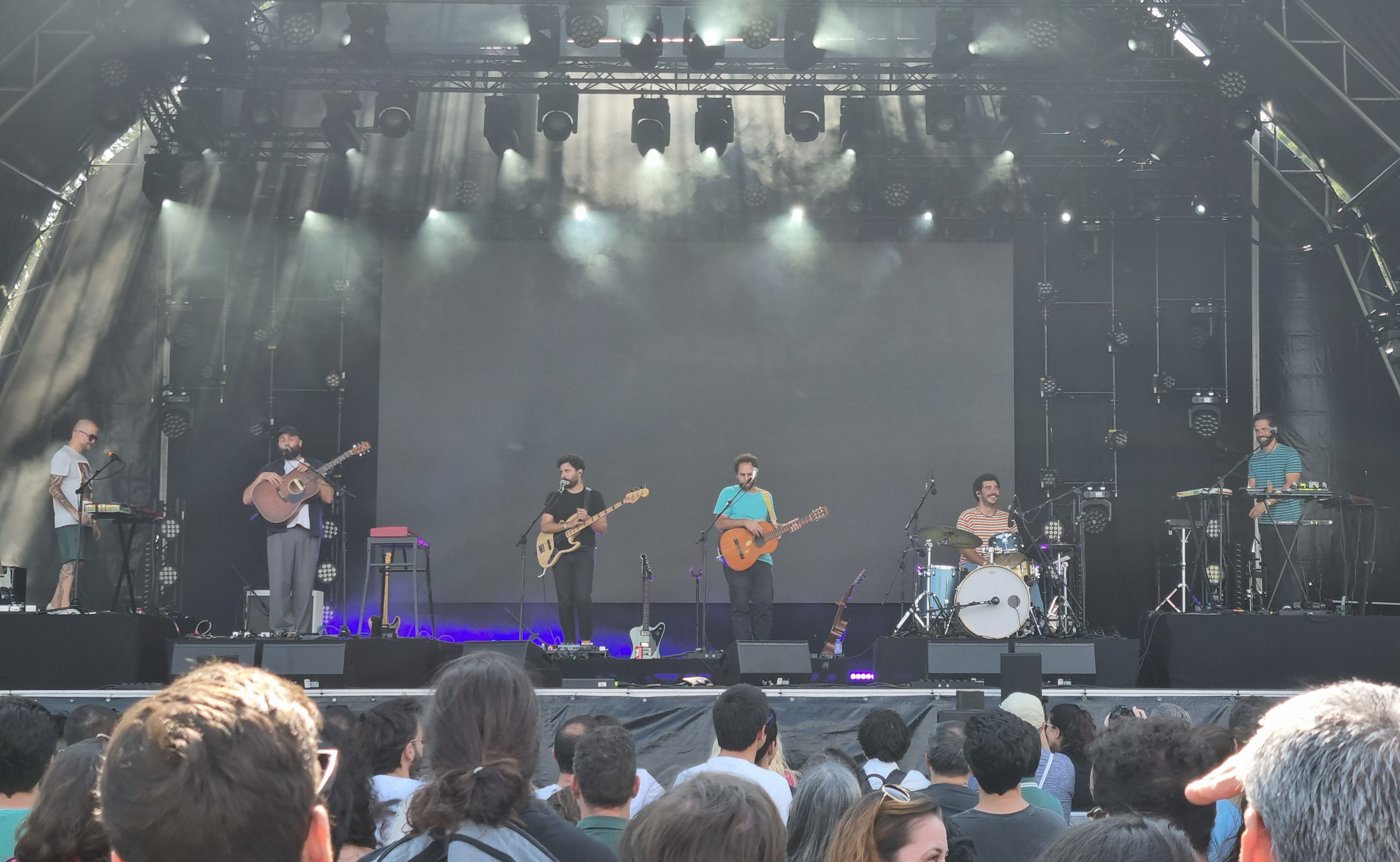
- You Can't Win, Charlie Brown in 2023

Background information
- Origin: Lisbon, Portugal
- Genres: Indie rock; alternative rock
- Years active: 2009–present
- Labels: Pataca Discos; Sony Music
- Members: Afonso Cabral; David Santos; Pedro Branco; Salvador Menezes; João Gil; Tomás Sousa

You Can't Win, Charlie Brown are a Portuguese rock band from Lisbon, formed in 2009. The band consists of Afonso Cabral (vocals, keyboards), David Santos (keyboards), Pedro Branco (guitar), Salvador Menezes (guitar, bass), João Gil (keyboards, bass) and Tomás Sousa (drums).

Their 2016 album Marrow reached number-one in the Portuguese album charts. The band has played in several major Portuguese music festivals and in international festivals such as South By Southwest and The Great Escape.

== Members ==
- Afonso Cabral – vocals, keyboards
- David Santos – keyboards
- Pedro Branco – guitar
- Salvador Menezes – guitar, bass
- João Gil – keyboards, bass
- Tomás Sousa – drums

== Discography ==
=== Studio albums ===
Title	Details	Peak chart positions
Title	Details	POR
Chromatic	Released: May 30, 2011; Label: Pataca Discos; Formats: CD, digital download	–
Diffraction/Refraction	Released: January 20, 2014; Label: Pataca Discos; Formats: CD, digital download	16
Marrow	Released: October 7, 2016; Label: Sony Music; Formats: CD, LP, digital download	1
Âmbar	Released: May 6, 2022; Label: Sony Music; Formats: CD, LP, digital download	–

=== Extended plays ===
- You Can't Win, Charlie Brown (2010)
