= Aritz Mendiola =

Spanish actor and singer

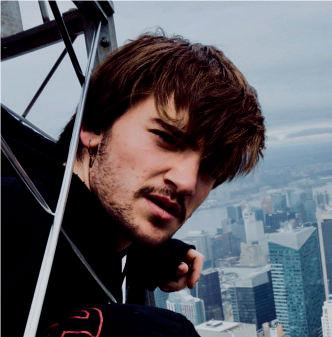
- Born: Aritz Mendiola Ardanza; 12 May 1998 (age 28); Gautegiz Arteaga, Spain
- Education: Mondragon University
- Occupations: actor, singer
- Years active: 2013-present

Aritz Mendiola Ardanza (born 12 May 1998) is a Spanish actor and singer who is known for his participation in programs such as Bago!az, for the television series Go!azen and for the radio program B Aldea of Gaztea. He is also a member of the rock music group LauKatu and the trap music group STR.

== Early life and education ==
He was born in 1998 at the Hospital de Arantzazu in San Sebastián (Gipuzkoa).

== Career ==
In 2015, he participated in the musical talent show Stars. Izarrak kalean from ETB 1. He reached the final of the contest, along with other contestants such as María Ereña or Sara Alonso, in which he sang the song "I See Fire" by Ed Sheeran. He was a finalist in the contest, with Sara Alonso as the winner. Then He participated again in the special edition of the talent with the finalists.

In 2016 he became part of the television series Go!azen with the character of Garikoitz "Gari" Susaeta. He was in the series for four seasons and a special, from 2016 to 2020. His participation in the series as the protagonist it was a remarkable success, so much so that different fan clubs of the actor even emerged.

In 2017, he joined the ETB1 television program Bago!az, as a judge of the contestants who participated in the musical contest.

In addition to audiovisual projects, he has also been part of theatrical productions. In 2015, CasaBranca, directed by Ana Borralho and Joao Galante, which was premiered at the "BAD Festival", the Bilbao Contemporary Theater and Dance Festival.

In 2018 he became part of the theater company Compañía Joven de Pabellón n. 6, with which he interpreted What happened to Ana García? premiered at the Teatro Arriaga and staged in different theaters.

As a musician, Mendiola sings and plays the guitar. In 2016 he formed the rock music group LauKatu, of which Mendiola is the vocalist and guitarist. In 2019 the group created the group STR (Special Trap Residence) with former members of LauKatu and new members.

In January 2019, he began to collaborate with the radio program B Aldea of Gaztea on EITB Media, with a weekly section called "guilty pleasure" that he presented.

== Private life ==
He is the grandson of Lehendakari Jose Antonio Ardanza, on his mother's side, and grandson of the former mayor of Larrabezúa Carlos Mendiola Apraiz, on his father's side.

He was in a relationship with actress Nerea Elizalde for two years until 2019. Then he was in a relationship with actress Ainhoa Larrañaga for two years until 2021. Both met while recording the series Go!azen together and the fan clubs of both of them called them (shipped) "Gareli" (with the hashtag #gareli) in reference to their characters Gari (Mendiola) and Eli (Larrañaga) in the series.

Since 2022 he has lived and resides in Seoul (South Korea).

== Discography ==
- 2019, Göxö, with STR
- 2021, Beldurrak marrazten (Gaua Records), with LauKatu
- 2022, YAHTOYL (You Always Hurt The One You Love), with STR

== Filmography ==
=== Television ===
- 2015, Stars. Izarrak kalean, ETB 1 (contestant)
- 2015, Kantugiro, ETB 1 (contestant)
- 2017–2019, Bagoǃaz (coach)
- 2017, Burubero Fest (guest)
- 2016–2017, Go!azen 3.0, ETB 1 (Gari)
- 2017–2018, Go!azen 4.0, ETB 1 (Gari)
- 2018–2019, Go!azen 5.0, ETB 1 (Gari)
- 2018, Go!azen ikusleen kuttunak, ETB 1 (presenter)
- 2019–2020, Go!azen 6.0, ETB 1 (Gari)
- 2019, Gure Kasa, ETB 1 (guest)
- 2019, Biba Zuek, ETB 1 (guest)
- 2020, Goǃazen etxean, ETB 1 (Gari)

=== Film ===
- 2016, Argi, dir. Iratxe Mediavilla

=== Stage ===
- 2015, CasaBranca, dir. Ana Borralho and Joao Galante (premiered at the "BAD Festival")
- 2016–2017, Goǃazen 3.0 (musical theatre)
- 2017–2018, Goǃazen 4.0 (musical theatre)
- 2019, ¿Qué fue de Ana García?, dir. Borja Ruiz (Pabellón n. 6)

=== Radio ===
- B Aldea
