= Twin Melody =

Spanish musical duo

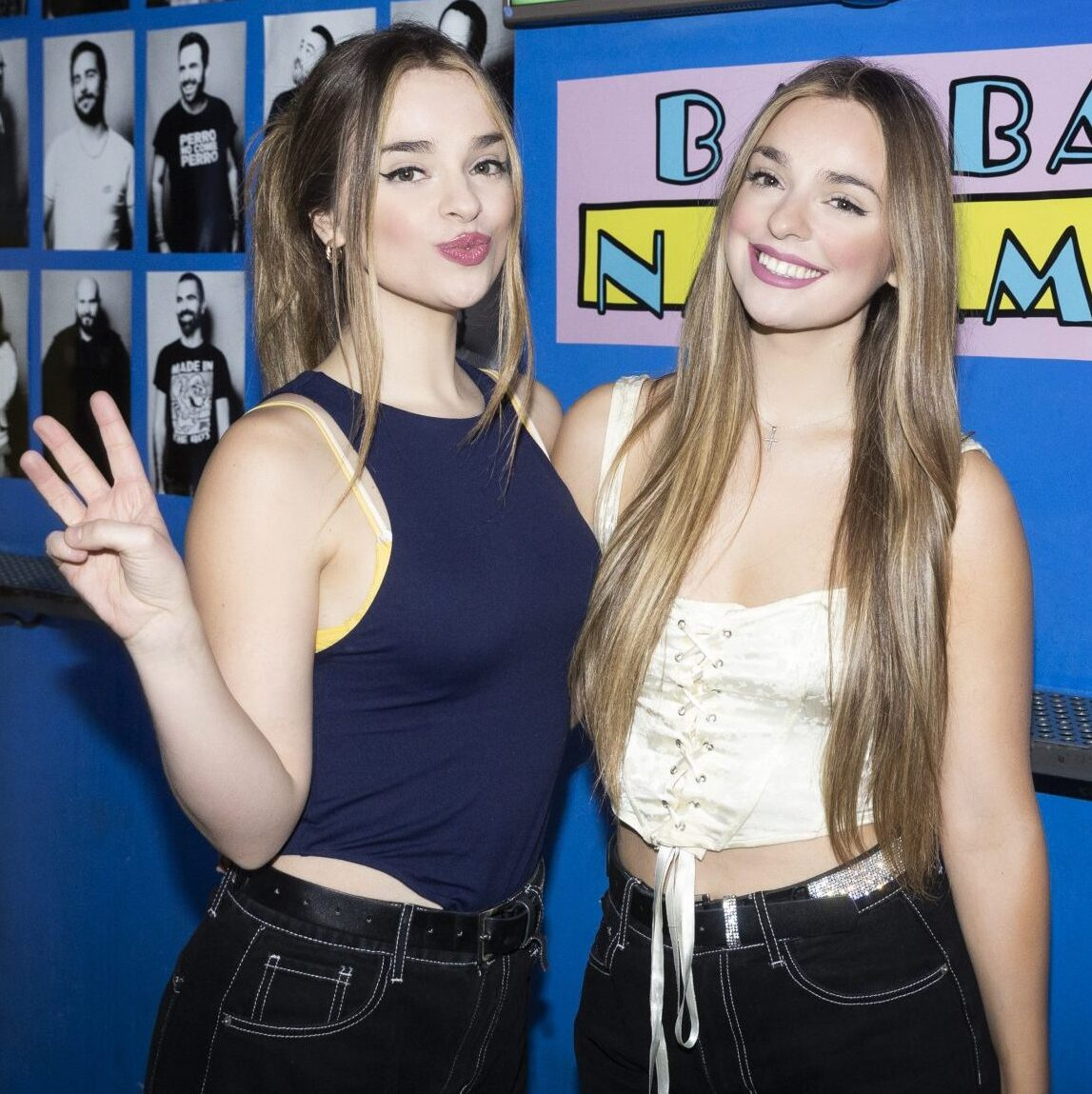
- Aitana (left) and Paula (right)

Background information
- Years active: 2013
- Label: Sony Music Entertainment Spain
- Members: Aitana Etxeberria; Paula Etxeberria

Twin Melody (born June 10, 1997) are a Spanish musical group and TikTokers formed by twin sisters Aitana and Paula Etxeberria. They have more than 16 million followers.

== Biography ==
They were born in 1997 in Ordizia, Gipuzkoa, and they study education. They studied at Musika Eskola and learned musical theory, but Paula chose piano and Aitana txistu. They are Catholic.

== Career ==
They began in 2013. In 2014 they won the first edition of ETB1 television programme A ze banda, in 2015 they won Caza Stars to become Alejandro Sanz support artist, and in 2016 they appeared on Go!azen. In 2020 they were cast in El hormiguero to teach TikTok coreographies and challenges. They also appeared in La Voz and Bia, by Disney Channel.

They released their first album with Sony Music and in 2021 they released No soy tuya. In 2022 they participated on Benidorm Fest 2023, where they reached the eighth place with the "Sayonara" song.
