= Blanca Paloma =

Spanish singer

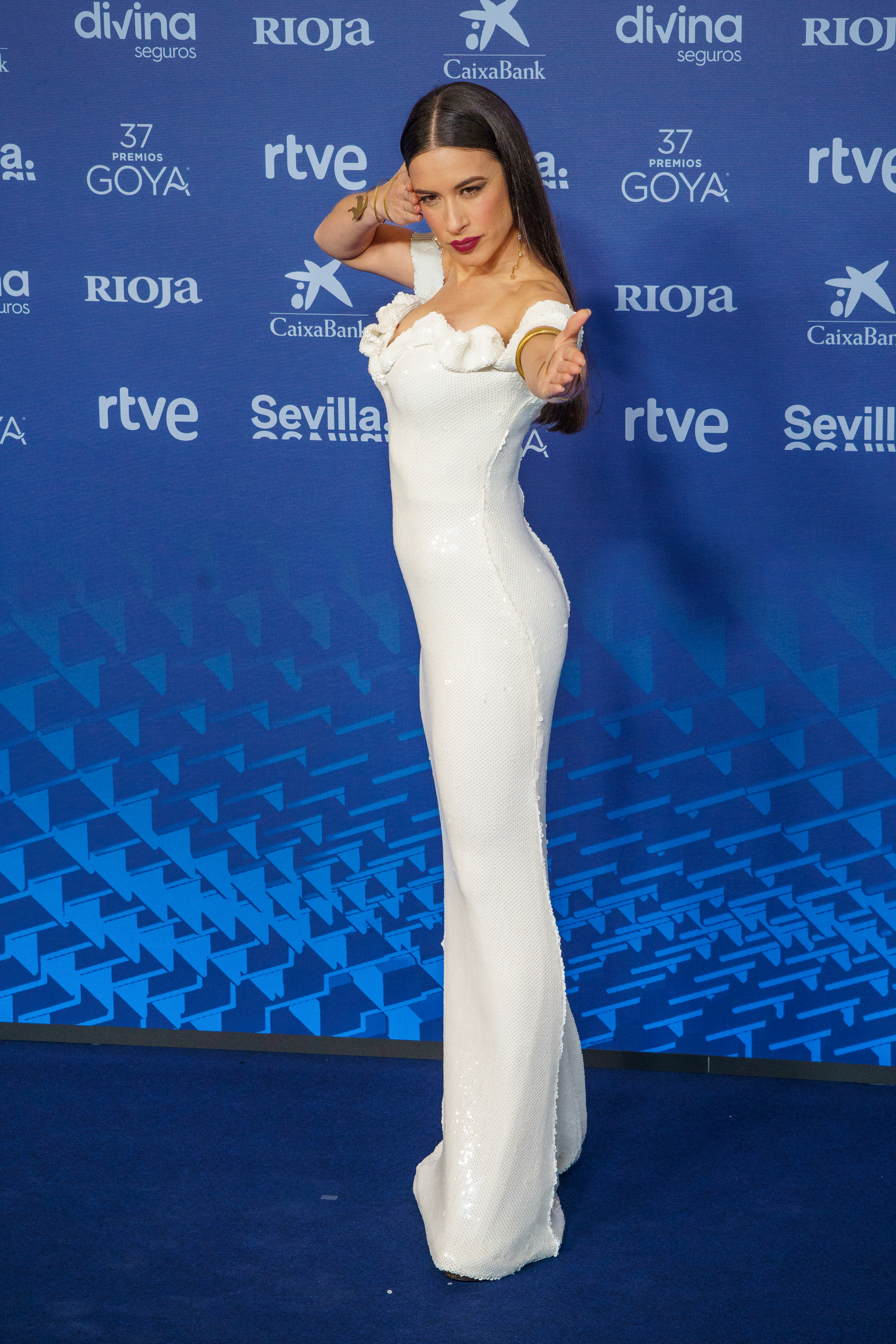
- Blanca Paloma in 2023

Background information
- Born: Blanca Paloma Ramos Baeza; 9 June 1989 (age 37); Elche, Valencian Community, Spain
- Genre: New flamenco
- Occupations: Singer; set designer; costume designer
- Instrument: Vocals
- Years active: 2013–present
- Label: Universal Music Publishing

Blanca Paloma Ramos Baeza (born 9 June 1989), also known by her given name of Blanca Paloma, is a Spanish singer, set designer and costume designer. She represented Spain in the Eurovision Song Contest 2023 with the song "Eaea", finishing in 17th place.

== Early life and education ==
She was born and raised in Elche. After graduating from Miguel Hernández University of Elche with a Bachelor of Fine Arts degree, Ramos moved to Madrid to pursue a career in theatre in 2013.

== Career ==
On 10 December 2021, it was announced that she would participate in Benidorm Fest 2022 with her song "Secreto de agua". She participated in the first semi-final and qualified to the final, in 3rd place with 79 points. In the final, she came in 5th place with 61 points.

The following year, she participated in Benidorm Fest 2023 with the song "Eaea". She performed in the second semi final and qualified to the final. In the final, she came in first place with 169 points (94 points from the juries, 40 points from the televote and 35 points from the demoscopic juries), and thus represented Spain at the Eurovision Song Contest 2023 in Liverpool, United Kingdom. She won 95 points from the jury while coming last in the televoting (5 points), (Note: 3 televoting points came from Portugal whilst the other 2 came from "rest of the world".) ultimately receiving a combined score of 100 points and placing 17th.

== Discography ==
=== Studio albums ===
Title	Details
Trenza Mía	Released: 9 June 2026; Label: El Tragaluz; Formats: Digital download, streaming, CD

=== Singles ===
List of singles, with selected chart positions
Title	Year	Peak chart positions	Album
Title	Year	LTU	Album
"Secreto De Agua"	2021	—	Non-album singles
"Niña De Fuego"	2022	—	Non-album singles
"Eaea"	2022	67	Non-album singles
"Plumas De Nácar"	2023	—	Non-album singles
"Jaleo"	2023	—	Non-album singles
"Caminar El Tiempo" (with Luis Ivars)	2025	—	Non-album singles
"Lo Fugaz"	2025	—	Trenza Mía
"Sentaíta En La Escalera"	2026	—	Trenza Mía
"Tarara Loca" (with Rocío Márquez)	2026	—	Trenza Mía
"Tu Recuerdo"	2026	—	Trenza Mía
"—" denotes a recording that did not chart or was not released in that territory.

== Notes ==
Awards and achievements
Preceded by Chanel	Benidorm Fest Winner; 2023	Succeeded by Nebulossa
Preceded by Chanel with "SloMo"	Spain in the Eurovision Song Contest; 2023	Succeeded by Nebulossa with "Zorra"
