= Montenegro in the Eurovision Song Contest 2022 =

- Eurovision Song Contest 2022
- Participating broadcaster: Radio i televizija Crne Gore (RTCG)
- Country: Montenegro
- Selection process: Internal selection
- Announcement date: Artist: 4 January 2022; Song: 4 March 2022

Competing entry
- Song: "Breathe"
- Artist: Vladana
- Songwriters: Vladana Vučinić; Darko Dimitrov

Placement
- Semi-final result: Failed to qualify (17th)

Participation chronology

Montenegro was represented at the Eurovision Song Contest 2022 with the song "Breathe", written by Vladana Vučinić and Darko Dimitrov, and performed by Vučinić herself. The Montenegrin participating broadcaster, Radio i televizija Crne Gore (RTCG), internally selected its entry for the contest. Vučinić was announced as the Montenegrin representative on 4 January 2022, while her song was presented to the public on 4 March 2022.

Montenegro was drawn to compete in the second semi-final of the Eurovision Song Contest, which took place on 12 May 2022. Performing during the show in position 15, "Breathe" was not announced among the top 10 entries of the second semi-final and therefore did not qualify to compete in the final. It was later revealed that Montenegro placed 17th out of the 18 participating countries in the semi-final with 33 points.

== Background ==
Prior to the 2022 contest, Radio i televizija Crne Gore (RTCG) has participated in the Eurovision Song Contest representing Montenegro as an independent country eleven times since its first entry in 2007. Its best placing in the contest was thirteenth, which they achieved in 2015 with the song "Adio" performed by Knez. In 2014, Montenegro qualified to the final for the first time since they began participating and have since featured in the final of the Eurovision Song Contest two times up to this point. RTCG briefly withdrew from the competition between 2010 and 2011 as well as between 2020 and 2021 citing "modest results" and/or financial difficulties as the reason for their absences. In 2019, it failed to qualify for the final with the song "Heaven" performed by D mol.

As part of its duties as participating broadcaster, RTCG organises the selection of its entry in the Eurovision Song Contest and broadcasts the event in the country. After a two-year absence, on 12 October 2021, RTCG confirmed that it would participate at the Eurovision Song Contest 2022. RTCG had used various methods to select the Montenegrin entry in the past, such as internal selections and televised national finals to choose the performer, song or both to compete at Eurovision. In 2018 and 2019, the Montenegrin entry was selected via the national final Montevizija. However, for 2022, the broadcaster opted to internally select both the artist and song that would represent Montenegro.

== Before Eurovision ==
=== Internal selection ===
On 28 October 2021, RTCG opened a submission period where artists and songwriters were able to submit their entries until 10 December 2021. At the closing of the deadline, RTCG received 30 entries, of which 24 were valid for consideration. A selection jury evaluated and marked the received submissions against a number of criteria: up to 50 points for composition, up to 30 points for lyrics and up to 20 points for the production potential of the composition. The jury consisted of Radio Montenegro music editor Stana Šalgo, TVCG music editor Branka Banović, President of the Association of Pop Artists and Performers of Montenegro and member of 2005 Serbian and Montenegrin entrant No Name Danijel Alibabić, music advisor at the Bureau for Educational Services of Montenegro Bojana Nenezić, professor at the Music School "Vasa Pavić" Zoja Đurović, TVCG entertainment editor Dražen Bauković, singer and 2013 Montenegrin Eurovision entrant Nina Žižić, RTCG director and producer Gojko Berkuljan, TV Teuta editor and director Ilmira Lika and RTCG Marketing Manager Đorđije Kustudić.

On 4 January 2022, RTCG announced during the TVCG 1 morning show Dobro jutro Crna Goro that Vladana Vučinić would represent Montenegro in Turin. Vladana previously attempted to represent Serbia and Montenegro at the Eurovision Song Contest in 2005 with the song "Samo moj nikad njen" which failed to qualify from the Montenegrin semi-final, and in 2006 with the song "Željna" which she performed in a duet with Bojana Nenezić and placed fifteenth. In regards to her selection as the Montenegrin representative, Vladana stated: "I know that life is in both black and white keys, and everyday is a brand new song. That's why it's interesting. We only realise what it means to fight for a life when it begins to hurt, and when the cure is the only mission. This is my song, my cure for Europe, and for the world."

The Montenegrin song, "Breathe", was presented during a television special titled Montenegro, dodici punti on 4 March 2022. The show was televised on TVCG 1 and TVCG SAT as well as broadcast online via the broadcaster's website rtcg.me. In addition to the presentation of the song, the show featured guest appearances by 2022 Macedonian Eurovision entrant Andrea, members of 2005 Serbian and Montenegrin entrant No Name and 2016 Montenegrin Eurovision entrant Highway Luka Vojvodić, Nina Žižić, 2015 Montenegrin Eurovision entrant Knez, and member of 2019 Montenegrin Eurovision entrant D mol Tamara Vujačić. "Breathe" was written by Vučinić herself together with Darko Dimitrov who also carried out the production and mixing. Vučinić recorded the music video for the song in early February 2022, which was filmed in Cetinje and directed by Gojko Berkuljan who described his involvement as an opportunity to "communicate the message of the song through strong visual and metaphorical elements that accentuate the deep connotations the lyrics convey [...] The whole ambience of the video acts as if it is frozen in time, with people and things slowly levitating in that airless and weightless space". The video was released via the official Eurovision Song Contest's YouTube channel on the same day.

=== Preparation and promotion ===
Prior to the contest, Vladana made several appearances across Europe to specifically promote "Breathe" as the Montenegrin Eurovision entry. On 5 March, Vladana performed "Breathe" during the final of the Romanian Eurovision national selection. On 11 March, Vladana performed during the Melfest WKND event, which was held at the Nalen venue in Stockholm, Sweden and hosted by Reine, Brenda Mandlar and Miss Tobi. Vladana also performed during the Barcelona Eurovision Party event on 26 March, which was held at the Sala Apolo venue in Barcelona, Spain and hosted by Sharonne and Giuseppe Di Bella. Having made several appearances in television talk shows in Serbia and Slovenia, Vladana performed at the London Eurovision Party, which was held at the Hard Rock Hotel venue on 3 April 2022 in London, United Kingdom and hosted by SuRie and Paddy O'Connell. On 7 April 2022, Vladana performed "Breathe" once again at the Menora Mivtachim Arena in Tel Aviv for the Israeli pre-party. She also performed in the Eurovision in Concert 2022 at AFAS Live in Amsterdam on 9 April 2022 hosted by Edsilia Rombley and Cornald Maas. Vladana then travelled to Madrid for PrePartyES, which was held on 16 April 2022. Vladana completed her promotional activities on 18 April after appearing on the Official Eurovision Song Contest podcast to discuss "Breathe" and Montenegro's plans for the contest in Turin.

In addition to participating in promotional activities across Europe to promote the Montenegrin entry, on 6 March 2022, Vladana recorded her 'live-on-tape' backup performance in Belgrade, Serbia alongside the entrants from Serbia and North Macedonia. This can be used if Vladana is unable to travel to Turin, or subjected to quarantine on arrival.

On 29 March 2022, it was revealed that Vladana would release a symphonic version of "Breathe" sung in Italian as "Respira", which was written by Natasa Latković. The filming for the symphonic version began on 29 March and was released on 6 April 2022. Vladana then released a Finnish version of "Breathe" on 22 April 2022.

== At Eurovision ==
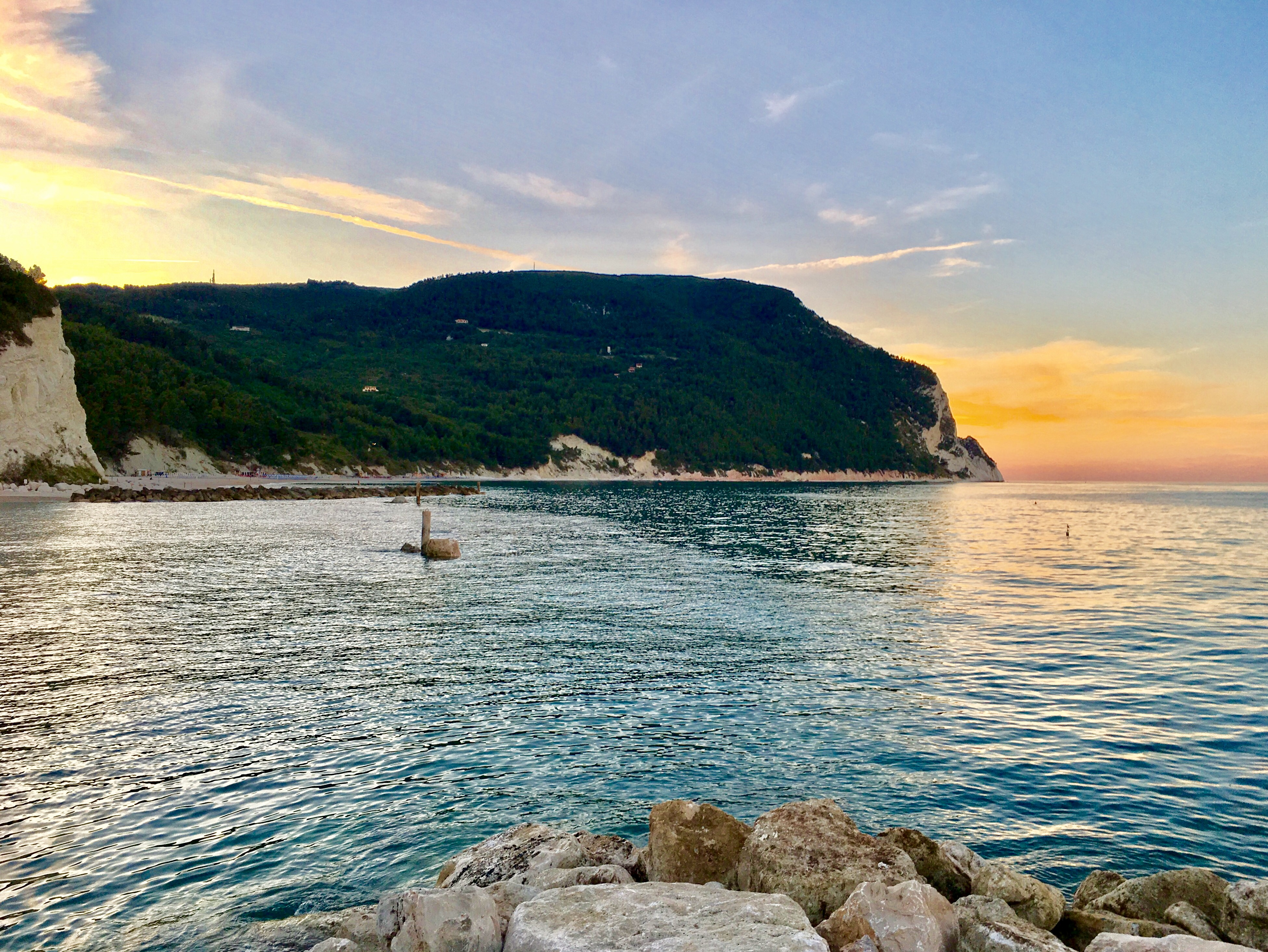
A video postcard introduced Vladana's performance in the second semi-final of the Eurovision Song Contest 2022. The postcard was filmed at the Monte Conero in Ancona and featured virtual projections of Vladana across the location.

According to Eurovision rules, all nations with the exceptions of the host country and the "Big Five" (France, Germany, Italy, Spain and the United Kingdom) are required to qualify from one of two semi-finals in order to compete for the final; the top ten countries from each semi-final progress to the final. The European Broadcasting Union (EBU) split up the competing countries into six different pots based on voting patterns from previous contests, with countries with favourable voting histories put into the same pot. On 25 January 2022, an allocation draw was held which placed each country into one of the two semi-finals, as well as which half of the show they would perform in. Montenegro has been placed into the second semi-final, to be held on 12 May 2022, and was scheduled to perform in the second half of the show.

Once all the competing songs for the 2022 contest had been released, the running order for the semi-finals was decided by the shows' producers rather than through another draw, so that similar songs were not placed next to each other. Montenegro was set to perform in position 15, following the entry from Poland and before the entry from Belgium.

In Montenegro, all shows were broadcast on RTCG 1, with commentary by Dražen Bauković and Tijana Mišković. The Montenegrin spokesperson, who announced the top 12-point score awarded by the Montenegrin jury during the final, was Andrijana Vešović under the pseudonym Zombijana Bones.

=== Semi-final ===
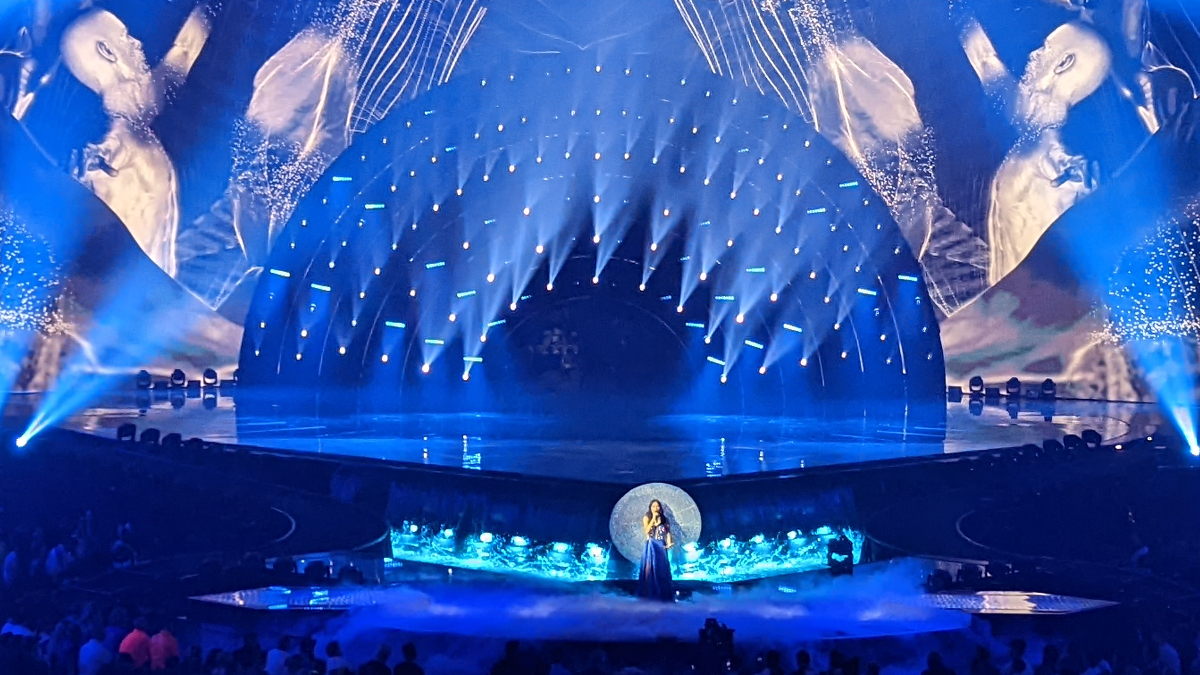
Vladana performing on the stage during the second semi-final.

Vladana took part in technical rehearsals on 3 and 6 May, followed by dress rehearsals on 11 and 12 May. This included the jury show on 11 May where the professional juries of each country watched and voted on the competing entries.

The Montenegrin performance featured Vladana alone on stage dressed in a blue LED dress that lit up during parts of the song, along with a luminous disc on her costume that lit up her breath. Vladana performed entirely on the secondary stage rather than the main stage. The design for the stage costume was a collaboration with French designer Clara Daguin and was programmed by a Google engineer from the company's Advanced Technology and Projects (ATAP) group to achieve the illumination effects. The Montenegrin creative team for Vladana's performance consisted of Gojko Berkuljan and Vesna Popadić, with Berkuljan previously directing the video for the song. It was revealed before the second semi-final that the Montenegrin delegation had not been able to achieve what they wanted to on stage due to technical issues during rehearsals.

At the end of the show, Montenegro was not announced among the top 10 entries in the second semi-final and therefore failed to qualify to compete in the final. This was the fifth consecutive absence of Montenegro from the final. It was later revealed that Vladana placed 17th out of the 18 entries in the second semi-final. Montenegro received a total of 33 points: 11 points from the juries and 22 points from the public televote.

=== Voting ===
Below is a breakdown of points awarded to Montenegro in the second semi-final. Voting during the three shows involved each country awarding two sets of points from 1–8, 10 and 12: one from their professional jury and the other from televoting. The exact composition of the professional jury, and the results of each country's jury and televoting were released after the final; the individual results from each jury member were also released in an anonymised form. In the second semi-final, Montenegro placed 17th with 33 points. This marked Montenegro's fifth consecutive non-qualification to the final since its last appearance in 2015. Over the course of the contest, Montenegro awarded its 12 points to Sweden (jury) and Serbia (televote) in the second semi-final, and to Serbia (in both the jury and the televote) in the final.

==== Points awarded to Montenegro ====
Points awarded to Montenegro (Semi-final 2)
| Score | Televote | Jury |
|---|---|---|
| 12 points | Serbia | |
| 10 points | North Macedonia | |
| 8 points | | |
| 7 points | | Serbia |
| 6 points | | |
| 5 points | | |
| 4 points | | |
| 3 points | | North Macedonia |
| 2 points | | |
| 1 point | | Spain |

==== Points awarded by Montenegro ====
Points awarded by Montenegro (Semi-final 2)
| Score | Televote | Aggregated jury |
|---|---|---|
| 12 points | Serbia | Sweden |
| 10 points | North Macedonia | Australia |
| 8 points | Cyprus | Belgium |
| 7 points | Estonia | Serbia |
| 6 points | Sweden | Estonia |
| 5 points | Belgium | Azerbaijan |
| 4 points | Czech Republic | Finland |
| 3 points | Australia | Poland |
| 2 points | Poland | Czech Republic |
| 1 point | Malta | North Macedonia |

Points awarded by Montenegro (Final)
| Score | Televote | Aggregated jury |
|---|---|---|
| 12 points | Serbia | Serbia |
| 10 points | Ukraine | Italy |
| 8 points | Spain | Spain |
| 7 points | Moldova | Sweden |
| 6 points | Italy | Ukraine |
| 5 points | Portugal | United Kingdom |
| 4 points | Poland | Portugal |
| 3 points | Estonia | Netherlands |
| 2 points | Norway | Lithuania |
| 1 point | Sweden | Azerbaijan |

==== Jury vote issues ====
In a statement released during the broadcast of the grand final, the EBU revealed that six countries, including Montenegro, were found to have irregular jury voting patterns during the second semi-final. Consequently, these countries were given substitute aggregated jury scores for both the second semi-final and the grand final (shown above), calculated from the corresponding jury scores of countries with historically similar voting patterns as determined by the pots for the semi-final allocation draw held in January. Their televoting scores were unaffected. The Flemish broadcaster VRT later reported that the juries involved had made agreements to vote for each other's entries to secure qualification to the grand final.

On 19 May, the EBU released a further statement clarifying the irregularities in voting patterns. This confirmed that the six countries involved had consistently scored each other's entries disproportionately highly in the second semi-final. This prompted the suspension of Montenegro's intended jury scores (shown below) in favour of the EBU's calculated aggregate scores, presented above. The Montenegrin broadcaster commented on the situation, strongly rejecting the accusations of vote manipulation and criticising the EBU's method of calculating the aggregate jury scores. The statement went on to request further transparency from the EBU over the issue.

Montenegro's suspended jury results (Semi-final 2)
| Score | Country |
|---|---|
| 12 points | Georgia |
| 10 points | Serbia |
| 8 points | Azerbaijan |
| 7 points | Romania |
| 6 points | San Marino |
| 5 points | Poland |
| 4 points | Sweden |
| 3 points | North Macedonia |
| 2 points | Finland |
| 1 point | Estonia |

Detailed voting results of Montenegro's suspended vote (Semi-final 2)
| R/O | Country | Juror 1 | Juror 2 | Juror 3 | Juror 4 | Juror 5 | Rank | Points |
|---|---|---|---|---|---|---|---|---|
| 01 | Finland | 12 | 10 | 15 | 10 | 2 | 9 | 2 |
| 02 | Israel | 14 | 16 | 16 | 14 | 11 | 17 | |
| 03 | Serbia | 5 | 6 | 3 | 2 | 1 | 2 | 10 |
| 04 | Azerbaijan | 3 | 2 | 2 | 3 | 7 | 3 | 8 |
| 05 | Georgia | 2 | 1 | 1 | 4 | 3 | 1 | 12 |
| 06 | Malta | 17 | 8 | 17 | 16 | 13 | 15 | |
| 07 | San Marino | 4 | 3 | 14 | 6 | 5 | 5 | 6 |
| 08 | Australia | 10 | 15 | 9 | 11 | 10 | 13 | |
| 09 | Cyprus | 8 | 11 | 13 | 12 | 9 | 11 | |
| 10 | Ireland | 16 | 12 | 10 | 17 | 16 | 16 | |
| 11 | North Macedonia | 7 | 7 | 7 | 7 | 8 | 8 | 3 |
| 12 | Estonia | 13 | 9 | 8 | 15 | 4 | 10 | 1 |
| 13 | Romania | 1 | 4 | 6 | 9 | 12 | 4 | 7 |
| 14 | Poland | 6 | 5 | 4 | 5 | 14 | 6 | 5 |
| 15 | Montenegro | | | | | | | |
| 16 | Belgium | 11 | 17 | 11 | 13 | 6 | 12 | |
| 17 | Sweden | 15 | 13 | 5 | 1 | 17 | 7 | 4 |
| 18 | Czech Republic | 9 | 14 | 12 | 8 | 15 | 14 | |

==== Detailed final results ====
Detailed voting results from Montenegro (Semi-final 2)
| R/O | Country | Aggregated jury (Note: Montenegro was among the six countries whose jury results were found to have had irregular voting patterns. Their jury votes were substituted with aggregated jury results for the second semi-final and the final based on countries with similar voting patterns, as determined by the pots that the countries were put into for the semi-final allocation draw.) | | Televote | |
| R/O | Country | Rank | Points | Rank | Points |
|---|---|---|---|---|---|
| 01 | Finland | 7 | 4 | 16 | |
| 02 | Israel | 11 | | 12 | |
| 03 | Serbia | 4 | 7 | 1 | 12 |
| 04 | Azerbaijan | 6 | 5 | 11 | |
| 05 | Georgia | 17 | | 14 | |
| 06 | Malta | 12 | | 10 | 1 |
| 07 | San Marino | 16 | | 15 | |
| 08 | Australia | 2 | 10 | 8 | 3 |
| 09 | Cyprus | 14 | | 3 | 8 |
| 10 | Ireland | 13 | | 17 | |
| 11 | North Macedonia | 10 | 1 | 2 | 10 |
| 12 | Estonia | 5 | 6 | 4 | 7 |
| 13 | Romania | 15 | | 13 | |
| 14 | Poland | 8 | 3 | 9 | 2 |
| 15 | Montenegro | | | | |
| 16 | Belgium | 3 | 8 | 6 | 5 |
| 17 | Sweden | 1 | 12 | 5 | 6 |
| 18 | Czech Republic | 9 | 2 | 7 | 4 |

Detailed voting results from Montenegro (Final)
| R/O | Country | Aggregated jury | | Televote | |
| R/O | Country | Rank | Points | Rank | Points |
|---|---|---|---|---|---|
| 01 | Czech Republic | 21 | | 21 | |
| 02 | Romania | 22 | | 14 | |
| 03 | Portugal | 7 | 4 | 6 | 5 |
| 04 | Finland | 16 | | 17 | |
| 05 | Switzerland | 14 | | 25 | |
| 06 | France | 25 | | 12 | |
| 07 | Norway | 20 | | 9 | 2 |
| 08 | Armenia | 17 | | 19 | |
| 09 | Italy | 2 | 10 | 5 | 6 |
| 10 | Spain | 3 | 8 | 3 | 8 |
| 11 | Netherlands | 8 | 3 | 15 | |
| 12 | Ukraine | 5 | 6 | 2 | 10 |
| 13 | Germany | 18 | | 16 | |
| 14 | Lithuania | 9 | 2 | 11 | |
| 15 | Azerbaijan | 10 | 1 | 20 | |
| 16 | Belgium | 11 | | 22 | |
| 17 | Greece | 12 | | 24 | |
| 18 | Iceland | 23 | | 23 | |
| 19 | Moldova | 24 | | 4 | 7 |
| 20 | Sweden | 4 | 7 | 10 | 1 |
| 21 | Australia | 15 | | 18 | |
| 22 | United Kingdom | 6 | 5 | 13 | |
| 23 | Poland | 19 | | 7 | 4 |
| 24 | Serbia | 1 | 12 | 1 | 12 |
| 25 | Estonia | 13 | | 8 | 3 |
