= Malta in the Eurovision Song Contest 2022 =

- Eurovision Song Contest 2022
- Participating broadcaster: Public Broadcasting Services (PBS)
- Country: Malta
- Selection process: Artist: Malta Eurovision Song Contest 2022; Song: Internal selection
- Selection date: Artist: 19 February 2022; Song: 14 March 2022

Competing entry
- Song: "I Am What I Am"
- Artist: Emma Muscat
- Songwriters: Dino Medanhodžić; Emma Muscat; Julie Aagaard; Stine Kinck

Placement
- Semi-final result: Failed to qualify (16th)

Participation chronology

Malta was represented at the Eurovision Song Contest 2022 with the song "I Am What I Am", written by Dino Medanhodžić, Emma Muscat, Julie Aagaard, and Stine Kinck, and performed by Muscat herself. The Maltese participating broadcaster, Public Broadcasting Services (PBS), was initially going to select its entry for the contest through the national final Malta Eurovision Song Contest 2022. The competition consisted of a semi-final round, a special show and a final, held on 17, 18, and 19 February 2022, respectively, where "Out of Sight" performed by Muscat eventually emerged as the winning entry after scoring the most points from a six-member jury and a public televote. On 14 March 2022, PBS announced that Muscat would ultimately perform "I Am What I Am" in the contest; the song, which was internally selected, was released to the public on the same day.

Malta was drawn to compete in the second semi-final of the Eurovision Song Contest which took place on 12 May 2022. Performing during the show in position 6, "I Am What I Am" was not announced among the top 10 entries of the second semi-final and therefore did not qualify to compete in the final. It was later revealed that Malta placed 16th out of the 18 participating countries in the semi-final with 47 points.

== Background ==
Prior to the 2022 contest, the Maltese Broadcasting Authority (MBA) until 1975, and the Public Broadcasting Services (PBS) since 1991, have participated in the Eurovision Song Contest representing Malta thirty-three times since MBA's first entry in 1971. MBA briefly competed in the contest in the 1970s before withdrawing for sixteen years, while PBS competed in every contest since their return in 1991. Their best placing in the contest thus far was second, achieved on two occasions: in 2002 with the song "7th Wonder" performed by Ira Losco and in the 2005 contest with the song "Angel" performed by Chiara. In the 2021 edition, "Je me casse" performed by Destiny qualified to the final and placed 7th.

As part of its duties as participating broadcaster, PBS organises the selection of its entry in the Eurovision Song Contest and broadcasts the event in the country. The broadcaster confirmed its intentions to participate at the 2022 contest on 21 June 2021. PBS used the talent show format X Factor Malta for its 2019 and 2020 participations which resulted in the selection of a winning performer that would subsequently be given an internally selected song to perform at Eurovision. However PBS announced that it would select its 2022 entry through a national final procedure, a method that was last used in 2018.

== Before Eurovision ==
=== Malta Eurovision Song Contest 2022 ===
Malta Eurovision Song Contest 2022 was the national final format developed by PBS to select its entry for the Eurovision Song Contest 2022. The competition consisted of a semi-final, a special show and a final held between 17 and 19 February 2022 at the Malta Fairs & Conventions Centre in Ta' Qali. All shows were broadcast on Television Malta (TVM) as well as on the broadcaster's website tvmnews.mt.

==== Format ====
The competition consisted of twenty-two songs competing in the semi-final on 17 February 2022 where the top sixteen entries qualified to compete in the final on 19 February 2022, which were announced during a special show on 18 February 2022. A wildcard finalist was also selected between the six eliminated entries. Six judges evaluated the songs during the shows and each judge had an equal stake in the final result. The seventh set of votes were the results of the public televote, which exclusively determined the final wildcard and had a weighting equal to the votes of a single judge in the final result. Ties in the final results were broken based on the entry which received the higher score from the televoting. The six members of the jury that evaluated the entries during both the semi-final and final consisted of:

- Carlo Borg Bonaci – Radio and television presenter
- Aurelio Belli – Conductor
- Maria Muscat – Singer
- Antoine Faure – Pianist, member of the band The Characters
- Nadine Muscat – Architect
- Ruth Amaira – Journalist

==== Competing entries ====
Artists and composers were able to submit their entries between 15 October 2021 and 15 December 2021. Songwriters from any nationality were able to submit songs as long as the artist were Maltese or possessed Maltese citizenship. Artists were able to submit as many songs as they wished, however, they could only compete with a maximum of one in the semi-final. Destiny, who represented Malta in 2021 was unable to compete due to a rule that prevented the previous entrant from competing in the following contest. The twenty-two songs selected to compete in the semi-final were announced on 29 December 2021. Among the competing acts were former Eurovision entrants Richard Edwards who represented Malta in 2014 as part of the group Firelight and Jessika Muscat who represented San Marino in 2018. Francesca Sciberras represented Malta in the Junior Eurovision Song Contest 2009 and Nicole Azzopardi represented Malta in the Junior Eurovision Song Contest 2010.

==== Semi-final ====
The semi-final took place on 17 February 2022 and was hosted by Stephanie Spiteri, Quinton Scerri and Ron Briffa. Twenty-two songs competed for eighteen qualifying spots in the final which were announced during the special show on 18 February 2022; the wildcard qualifier was announced prior to the final on 19 February. The running order for the semi-final was announced on 6 February 2022.

Semi-final – 17 February 2022
R/O	Artist	Song	Songwriter(s)	Result
1	Aidan	"Ritmu"	Aidan Cassar, Boban Apostolov	Qualified
2	Janice Mangion	"Army"	Cyprian Cassar, Mark Scicluna, Emil Calleja Bayliss	Qualified
3	Nicole Hammett	"A Lover's Heart"	Cyprian Cassar, Joe Julian Farrugia	Qualified
4	Sarah Bonnici	"Heaven"	Aidan Cassar	Qualified
5	Mark Anthony Bartolo	"Serenity"	Mark Anthony Bartolo	Qualified
6	Denise	"Boy"	Aidan Cassar	Qualified
7	Richard Edwards	"Hey Little"	Richard Micallef	Qualified
8	Francesca Sciberras	"Rise"	Mark Scicluna, Etienne Micallef	—N/a
9	Miriana Conte	"Look What You've Done Now"	Cyprian Cassar, Matthew Mercieca	Qualified
10	Giada	"Revelación"	Aidan Cassar	Qualified
11	Baklava feat. Nicole	"Electric Indigo"	Philip Vella, Gerard James Borg	Qualified
12	Derrick Schembri	"II"	Cyprian Cassar, Emil Calleja Bayliss	—N/a
13	Norbert	"How Special You Are"	Shaun Farrugia, Norbert Bondin, Peter Borg	Qualified
14	Raquel	"Over You"	Aidan Cassar	Qualified
15	Jessica Grech	"Aphrodisiac"	Philip Vella, Gerard James Borg	—N/a
16	Matt Blxck	"Come Around"	Matthew Caruana, David Grech	Qualified
17	Rachel Lowell	"White Doves"	Ylva Persson, Linda Persson, Peter Frodin, Emil Calleja Bayliss	—N/a
18	Nicole Azzopardi	"Into the Fire"	Peter Boström, Per Jonsson, Marika Lindė, Dimitri Stassos, Nektarios Tyrakis	Qualified
19	Emma Muscat	"Out of Sight"	Antonio Caputo, Emma Muscat, Gabriel Rossi, Lorenzo Santarelli, Marco Salvaderi	Qualified
20	Malcolm Pisani	"We Came for Love"	Gaspare Incatasciato, Matthew Mercieca	—N/a
21	Enya Magri	"Shame"	Cyprian Cassar, Jodie Magri	Qualified
22	Jessika	"Kaleidoscope"	Philip Vella, Gerard James Borg	Wildcard

==== Special show ====
The special show, which celebrated Malta's 50th Anniversary since their first participation in the Eurovision Song Contest, took place on 18 February 2022 and was hosted by Ryan Borg and Josmar Gatt. The twenty-two contestants performed former Maltese Eurovision songs in duets with their respective original artists. The show was opened with a guest performance from the Analise Dance Studio, and featured a tribute to Christopher Scicluna, who represented Malta in 1994 and who had died the same day.

Special show – 18 February 2022
R/O	Artist	Song	Year performed (Note: Refers to the year the song performed in the Eurovision Song Contest.)
1	Aidan and Malcolm Pisani	"Marija l-Maltija" (with Joe Grech)	1971
2	Baklava, Nicole Vella and Nicole Hammett	"Vertigo" (with Olivia Lewis)	2007
3	Malcolm Pisani and Matt Blxck	"One Life" (with Glen Vella)	2011
4	Derrick Schembri, Emma Muscat and Miriana Conte	"This Is the Night" (with Kurt Calleja)	2012
5	Aidan, Richard Edwards, Janice Mangion and Giada	"Could It Be" (with Paul Giordimaina and Georgina)	1991
6	Francesca Sciberras and Nicole Azzopardi	"In a Woman's Heart" (with Miriam Christine)	1996
7	Derrick Schembri and Norbert	"Keep Me in Mind" (with Mike Spiteri)	1995
8	Mark Anthony Bartolo and Sarah Bonnici	"L-imħabba" (with Helen and Joseph)	1972
9	Enya Magri and Jessika	"My Dream" (with Thea Garrett)	2010
10	Enya Magri and Nicole Hammett	"Warrior" (with Amber)	2015
11	Jessika and Nicole Azzopardi	"Vodka" (with Morena)	2008
12	Denise and Rachel Lowell	"7th Wonder" / "Walk on Water" (with Ira Losco)	2002 ("7th Wonder"); 2016 ("Walk on Water")
13	Renato	"Singing This Song"	1975
14	Giada and Raquel	"Chameleon" (with Michela)	2019
15	Mark Anthony Bartolo and Matt Blxck	"Tomorrow" (with Gianluca Bezzina)	2013
16	Denise and Raquel	"The One That I Love" / "Angel" / "What If We" (with Chiara)	1998 ("The One That I Love"); 2005 ("Angel"); 2009 ("What If We")
17	Francesca Sciberras and Jessica Grech	"To Dream Again" (with Lynn Chircop)	2003
18	Nicole Hammett and Sarah Bonnici	"On Again... Off Again" (with Julie and Ludwig)	2004
19	Emma Muscat and Francesca Sciberras	"Breathlessly" (with Claudia Faniello)	2017
20	Baklava, Nicole and Jessica Grech	"Let Me Fly" (with Debbie Scerri)	1997
21	Janice Mangion	"Little Child" (with Mary Spiteri)	1992

==== Final ====
The final took place on 19 February 2022 and was hosted by Stephanie Spiteri, Quinton Scerri and Ron Briffa. The seventeen entries that qualified from the semi-final were performed again and the votes of a six-member jury panel (6/7) and the results of public televoting (1/7) determined the winner. The show was opened with a guest performance from the Analise Dance Studio, while the interval act featured performances by the Concept of Movement dance troupe, Malta's Junior Eurovision Song Contest 2015 winner and 2021 Eurovision entrant Destiny Chukunyere and 2021 Maltese Junior Eurovision entrants Ike and Kaya. After the votes from the jury panel and televote were combined, "Out of Sight" performed by Emma Muscat was the winner.

Final – 19 February 2022
R/O	Artist	Song	Jury	Televote	Total	Place
1	Baklava feat. Nicole	"Electric Indigo"	6	1	7	15
2	Norbert	"How Special You Are"	30	4	34	4
3	Matt Blxck	"Come Around"	15	3	18	7
4	Giada	"Revelación"	7	1	8	13
5	Jessika	"Kaleidoscope"	0	1	1	17
6	Raquel	"Over You"	8	0	8	14
7	Nicole Hammett	"A Lover's Heart"	15	1	16	8
8	Miriana Conte	"Look What You've Done Now"	27	1	28	6
9	Nicole Azzopardi	"Into the Fire"	31	5	36	3
10	Sarah Bonnici	"Heaven"	9	1	10	12
11	Enya Magri	"Shame"	12	3	15	9
12	Denise	"Boy"	28	3	31	5
13	Emma Muscat	"Out of Sight"	72	20	92	1
14	Janice Mangion	"Army"	6	1	7	16
15	Mark Anthony Bartolo	"Serenity"	10	1	11	11
16	Aidan	"Ritmu"	60	12	72	2
17	Richard Edwards	"Hey Little"	12	1	13	10

Detailed Jury Votes
R/O	Song	C. Borg Bonaci	A. Belli	M. Muscat	A. Faure	N. Muscat	R. Amaira	Total
1	"Electric Indigo"	6						6
2	"How Special You Are"	4	6	5	5	6	4	30
3	"Come Around"		5	3	7			15
4	"Revelación"	1		6				7
5	"Kaleidoscope"							0
6	"Over You"	2	1			2	3	8
7	"A Lover's Heart"	3	2	8			2	15
8	"Look What You've Done Now"	5	3		8	5	6	27
9	"Into the Fire"	8		7	2	7	7	31
10	"Heaven"		7		1	1		9
11	"Shame"				3	4	5	12
12	"Boy"	7		1	4	8	8	28
13	"Out of Sight"	12	12	12	12	12	12	72
14	"Army"				6			6
15	"Serenity"		4	2		3	1	10
16	"Ritmu"	10	10	10	10	10	10	60
17	"Hey Little"		8	4				12

==== Ratings ====
Viewing figures by show
Show	Date	Viewers	Ref.
Final	19 February 2022	226,000	

=== Song selection ===
Following Emma Muscat's win at the Malta Eurovision Song Contest 2022, rumours began circulating that the singer would perform a song other than "Out of Sight" in Turin. This was in accordance with the rules of the selection, which stated that the winner could replace their national final winning entry and send any song they wished, as long as it abides by the rules of the Eurovision Song Contest. The singer confirmed the heavily speculated theory during an interview broadcast on the TVM programme TVAM on 14 March, where she stated that she would instead perform her new single "I Am What I Am".

The song, written by Dino Medanhodžić, Julie Aagaard, Stine Kinck and Muscat herself, was selected from a catalogue of songs submitted by Danish music company The Arrangement, with two songs shortlisted prior to the selection of "I Am What I Am"; PBS had commenced a search for a replacement entry the day following Muscat's win at the Malta Eurovision Song Contest. In June 2024, fan site Eurosong-DK reported that the other song in contention was "Sand", which would go on to represent Denmark in the 2024 contest, performed by Saba.

=== Promotion ===
Prior to the contest, Muscat made appearances across Europe to specifically promote "I Am What I Am" as the Maltese Eurovision entry. She first performed at the Barcelona Eurovision Party, which was held on 26 March 2022 at Barcelona's Sala Apolo, and later performed at the London Eurovision Party, which was held on 3 April 2022 at London's Hard Rock Hotel venue. On 7 April, she performed during the Israel Calling event held at the Menora Mivtachim Arena in Tel Aviv, Israel, and Eurovision in Concert at Amsterdam's AFAS Live on 9 April. On 16 April, she performed at the PrePartyES which took place in Madrid's Sala La Riviera. In addition to her international appearances, Emma Muscat recorded her 'live-on-tape' performance in Sofia, Bulgaria on 19 March. This would have been used in the event that she was unable to travel to Turin, or subjected to quarantine on arrival.

== At Eurovision ==
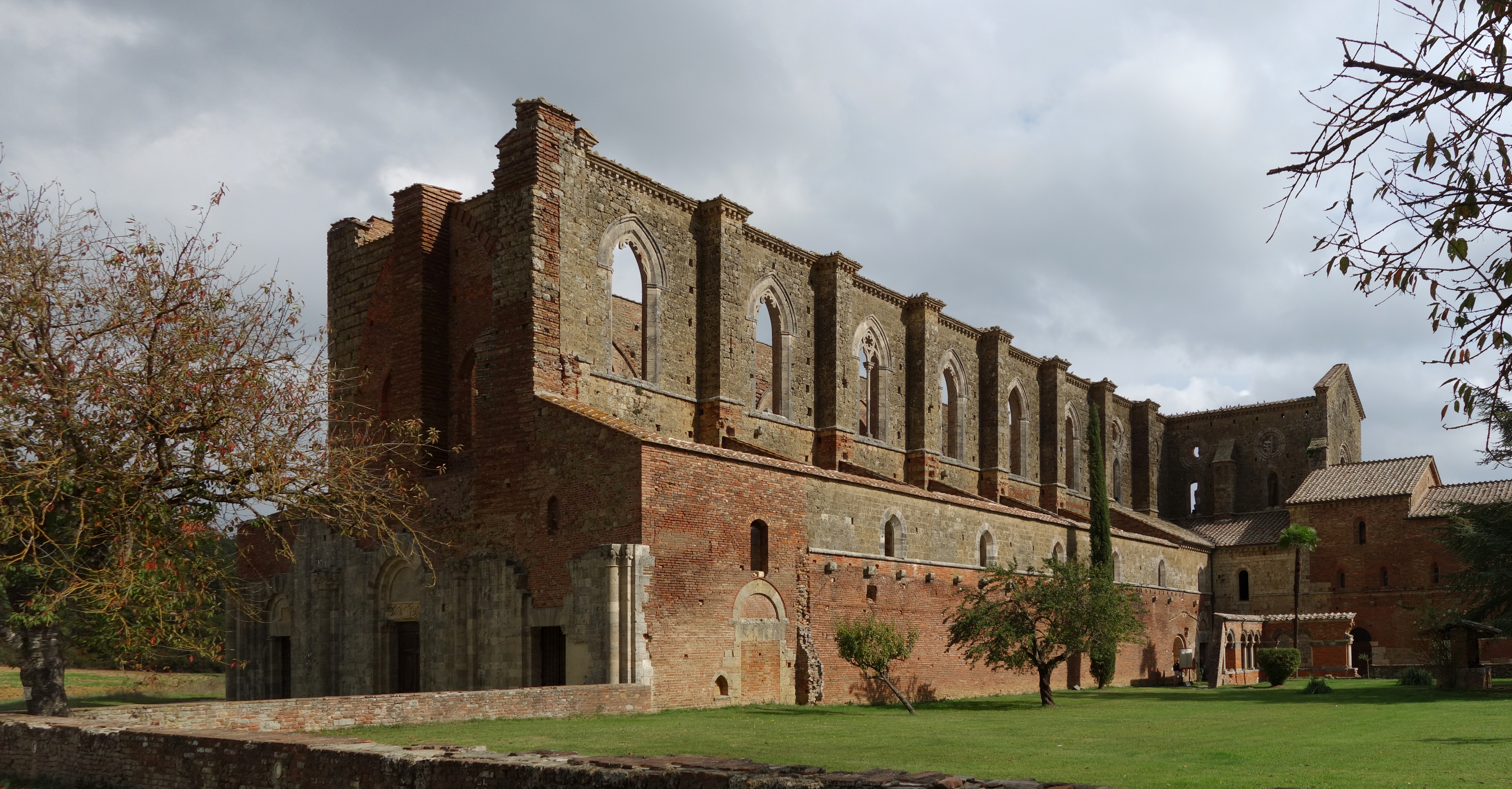
A video postcard introduced Emma Muscat's performance in the second semi-final of the Eurovision Song Contest 2022. The postcard was filmed at the Abbey of San Galgano in Siena, Tuscany and featured virtual projections of Muscat across the location.

According to Eurovision rules, all nations with the exceptions of the host country and the "Big Five" (France, Germany, Italy, Spain and the United Kingdom) are required to qualify from one of two semi-finals in order to compete for the final; the top ten countries from each semi-final progress to the final. The European Broadcasting Union (EBU) split up the competing countries into six different pots based on voting patterns from previous contests, with countries with favourable voting histories put into the same pot. On 25 January 2022, an allocation draw was held which placed each country into one of the two semi-finals, as well as which half of the show they would perform in. Malta was placed into the second semi-final, to be held on 12 May 2022, and has been scheduled to perform in the first half of the show.

Once all the competing songs for the 2022 contest had been released, the running order for the semi-finals was decided by the shows' producers rather than through another draw, so that similar songs were not placed next to each other. Malta was set to perform in position 6, following the entry from Georgia and before the entry from San Marino.

The two semi-finals and the final were broadcast in Malta on TVM. The Maltese spokesperson, who announced the top 12 points awarded by the Maltese jury during the final, was Aidan Cassar.

=== Semi-final ===
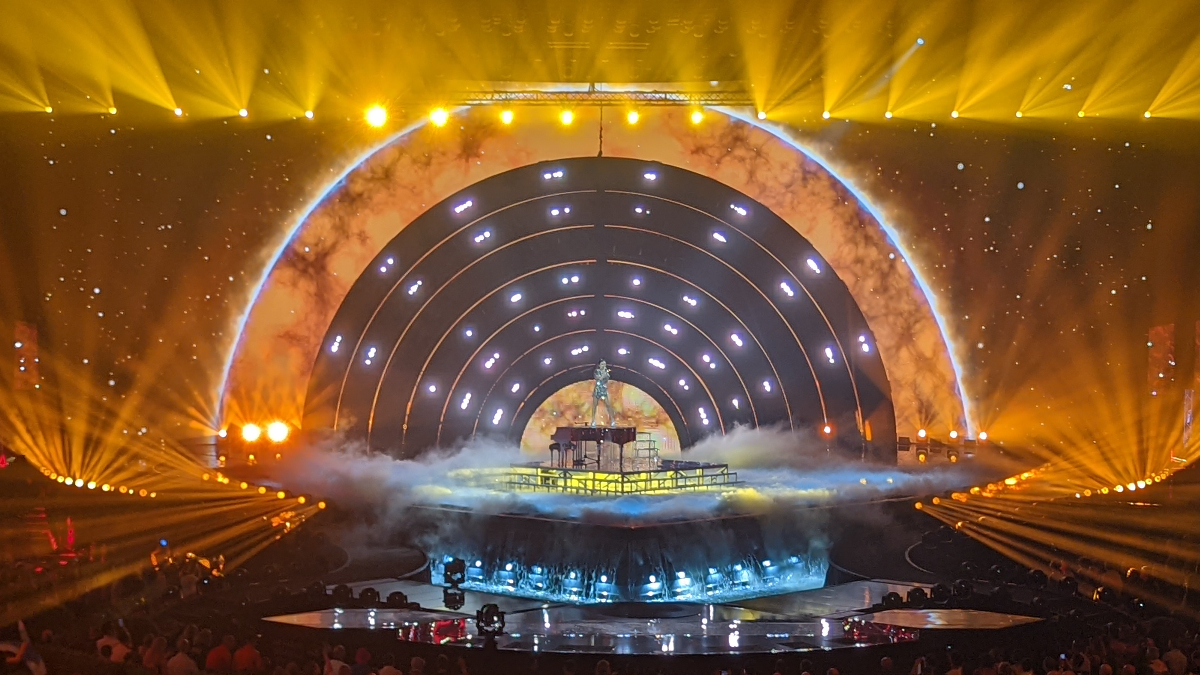
Emma Muscat performing during the second semi-final

Emma Muscat took part in technical rehearsals on 2 and 5 May, followed by dress rehearsals on 11 and 12 May. This included the jury show on 11 May where the professional juries of each country watched and voted on the competing entries.

The Maltese performance featured Emma Muscat wearing a mini dress made out of small mirrored panels with silver trainers and performing together with four dancers. The performance began with Emma Muscat playing the piano on a platform in front of the stage with the LED screen floor displaying a white square followed by Muscat climbing on top of the piano during the first chorus and walking down to the satellite stage with the dancers to perform a choreographed routine during the final chorus. The creative director for the Maltese performance was Gordon Bonello. The four dancers featured during the performance were: Frank Ksey, Giulia Santoriello, Lorenzo De Rosa and Shadia Taghi.

At the end of the show, Malta was not announced as having finished in the top 10 and did not qualify for the grand final. It was later revealed that Malta placed sixteenth in the semi-final, receiving a total of 47 points: 20 points from the televoting and 27 points from the juries.

=== Voting ===
Voting during the three shows involved each country awarding two sets of points from 1-8, 10 and 12: one from their professional jury and the other from televoting. Each nation's jury consisted of five music industry professionals who are citizens of the country they represent. This jury judged each entry based on: vocal capacity; the stage performance; the song's composition and originality; and the overall impression by the act. In addition, each member of a national jury may only take part in the panel once every three years, and no jury was permitted to discuss of their vote with other members or be related in any way to any of the competing acts in such a way that they cannot vote impartially and independently. The individual rankings of each jury member in an anonymised form as well as the nation's televoting results were released shortly after the grand final.

Below is a breakdown of points awarded to Malta and awarded by Malta in the second semi-final and grand final of the contest, and the breakdown of the jury voting and televoting conducted during the two shows:

==== Points awarded to Malta ====
Points awarded to Malta (Semi-final 2)
Score	Televote	Jury
12 points		
10 points		
8 points		
7 points		Sweden
6 points		Ireland; North Macedonia
5 points		
4 points		
3 points	Azerbaijan; Estonia; Ireland; North Macedonia	
2 points	Belgium; Serbia; Sweden	Azerbaijan; Israel
1 point	Cyprus; Montenegro	Czech Republic; Estonia; Georgia; San Marino

==== Points awarded by Malta ====
Points awarded by Malta (Semi-final 2)
Score	Televote	Jury
12 points	Serbia	Sweden
10 points	Sweden	Australia
8 points	San Marino	Estonia
7 points	Australia	Czech Republic
6 points	Finland	Poland
5 points	Romania	North Macedonia
4 points	Poland	Azerbaijan
3 points	Ireland	Finland
2 points	Czech Republic	Israel
1 point	Cyprus	Georgia

Points awarded by Malta (Final)
Score	Televote	Jury
12 points	United Kingdom	Spain
10 points	Italy	Sweden
8 points	Ukraine	United Kingdom
7 points	Spain	Italy
6 points	Serbia	Australia
5 points	Sweden	Estonia
4 points	Norway	Poland
3 points	Romania	Czech Republic
2 points	Poland	Azerbaijan
1 point	Finland	Greece

==== Detailed voting results ====
The following members comprised the Maltese jury:

- Antoine Faure
- Claudia Faniello
- Daniel D'Anastasi
- Gaia Cauchi
- Maria Abdilla

Detailed voting results from Malta (Semi-final 2)
R/O	Country	Jury							Televote	
R/O	Country	Juror A	Juror B	Juror C	Juror D	Juror E	Rank	Points	Rank	Points
01	Finland	14	8	14	4	11	8	3	5	6
02	Israel	10	5	11	10	12	9	2	14	
03	Serbia	17	11	12	15	4	11		1	12
04	Azerbaijan	2	15	8	12	13	7	4	15	
05	Georgia	15	7	13	9	8	10	1	16	
06	Malta									
07	San Marino	12	16	10	14	16	17		3	8
08	Australia	3	6	2	1	2	2	10	4	7
09	Cyprus	8	17	9	13	17	15		10	1
10	Ireland	9	9	17	17	14	16		8	3
11	North Macedonia	13	12	5	7	5	6	5	13	
12	Estonia	5	4	3	6	3	3	8	11	
13	Romania	11	13	7	11	10	12		6	5
14	Poland	7	2	6	5	6	5	6	7	4
15	Montenegro	16	10	15	8	7	13		17	
16	Belgium	4	14	16	16	15	14		12	
17	Sweden	1	1	1	2	1	1	12	2	10
18	Czech Republic	6	3	4	3	9	4	7	9	2

Detailed voting results from Malta (Final)
R/O	Country	Jury							Televote	
R/O	Country	Juror A	Juror B	Juror C	Juror D	Juror E	Rank	Points	Rank	Points
01	Czech Republic	9	10	7	9	8	8	3	20	
02	Romania	22	17	8	11	9	11		8	3
03	Portugal	10	19	14	12	20	16		17	
04	Finland	13	11	21	10	15	15		10	1
05	Switzerland	12	9	17	22	12	14		23	
06	France	25	22	23	19	25	25		21	
07	Norway	20	24	18	15	22	22		7	4
08	Armenia	19	13	13	20	24	20		22	
09	Italy	4	2	3	8	6	4	7	2	10
10	Spain	3	5	2	1	1	1	12	4	7
11	Netherlands	23	18	9	13	21	17		16	
12	Ukraine	21	16	20	5	23	13		3	8
13	Germany	16	21	24	21	19	24		19	
14	Lithuania	14	12	16	18	14	18		15	
15	Azerbaijan	11	15	15	14	3	9	2	24	
16	Belgium	18	14	25	24	11	19		18	
17	Greece	8	7	12	16	17	10	1	14	
18	Iceland	24	25	11	23	18	21		25	
19	Moldova	17	23	22	25	16	23		11	
20	Sweden	2	3	1	4	2	2	10	6	5
21	Australia	6	6	6	2	5	5	6	12	
22	United Kingdom	1	1	4	3	4	3	8	1	12
23	Poland	15	4	10	6	10	7	4	9	2
24	Serbia	5	20	19	17	13	12		5	6
25	Estonia	7	8	5	7	7	6	5	13	
