= Poland in the Eurovision Song Contest 2022 =

- Eurovision Song Contest 2022
- Participating broadcaster: Telewizja Polska (TVP)
- Country: Poland
- Selection process: Tu bije serce Europy! Wybieramy hit na Eurowizję!
- Selection date: 19 February 2022

Competing entry
- Song: "River"
- Artist: Ochman
- Songwriters: Krystian Ochman; Ashley Hicklin; Adam Wiśniewski; Mikołaj Trybulec

Placement
- Semi-final result: Qualified (6th, 198 points)
- Final result: 12th, 151 points

Participation chronology

Poland was represented at the Eurovision Song Contest 2022 with the song "River" performed by Ochman. The Polish broadcaster Telewizja Polska (TVP) first announced in September 2021 that the Polish entry for the 2022 contest would be chosen through an internal selection. However, the broadcaster later decided to organise the national final Tu bije serce Europy! Wybieramy hit na Eurowizję! in order to select the Polish entry. The national final took place on 19 February 2022 and featured ten entries. "River" performed by Ochman was selected as the winner following the combination of votes from a five-member jury panel and a public vote over two rounds of voting.

Poland was drawn to compete in the second semi-final of the Eurovision Song Contest which took place on 12 May 2022. Performing during the show in position 14, "River" was announced among the top 10 entries of the second semi-final and therefore qualified to compete in the final on 14 May. It was later revealed that Poland placed sixth out of the 18 participating countries in the semi-final with 198 points. In the final, Poland performed in position 23 and placed twelfth out of the 25 participating countries, scoring 151 points.

== Background ==
Prior to the 2022 contest, Poland had participated in the Eurovision Song Contest twenty-three times since its first entry in 1994. Poland's highest placement in the contest, to this point, has been second place, which the nation achieved with its debut entry in 1994 with the song "To nie ja!" performed by Edyta Górniak. Poland has only reached the top ten on two other occasions, when Ich Troje performing the song "Keine Grenzen – Żadnych granic" finished seventh in 2003, and when Michał Szpak performing the song "Color of Your Life" finished eighth in 2016. Between 2005 and 2011, Poland failed to qualify from the semi-final round six out of seven years with only their 2008 entry, "For Life" performed by Isis Gee, managing to take the nation to the final during that period. After once again failing to qualify to the final in 2011, the country withdrew from the contest throughout 2013. Since returning to the contest in 2014, Poland managed to qualify to the final each year before failing to qualify to the final between 2018 and 2021, the latter with their entry "The Ride" performed by Rafał Brzozowski.

The Polish national broadcaster, Telewizja Polska (TVP), broadcasts the event within Poland and organises the selection process for the nation's entry. TVP confirmed Poland's participation in the 2022 Eurovision Song Contest on 29 August 2021. The broadcaster opted to internally select the Polish entry for the 2021 Eurovision Song Contest, a selection procedure that was to be continued for their 2022 entry. The selected entry was scheduled to be presented by 2 January 2022, which was later delayed to 15 January 2022. However, on 14 January 2022, TVP announced that the Polish entry would be selected via a national final; the last time the Polish entry was selected via a national final was in 2020.

== Before Eurovision ==
=== Tu bije serce Europy! Wybieramy hit na Eurowizję! ===
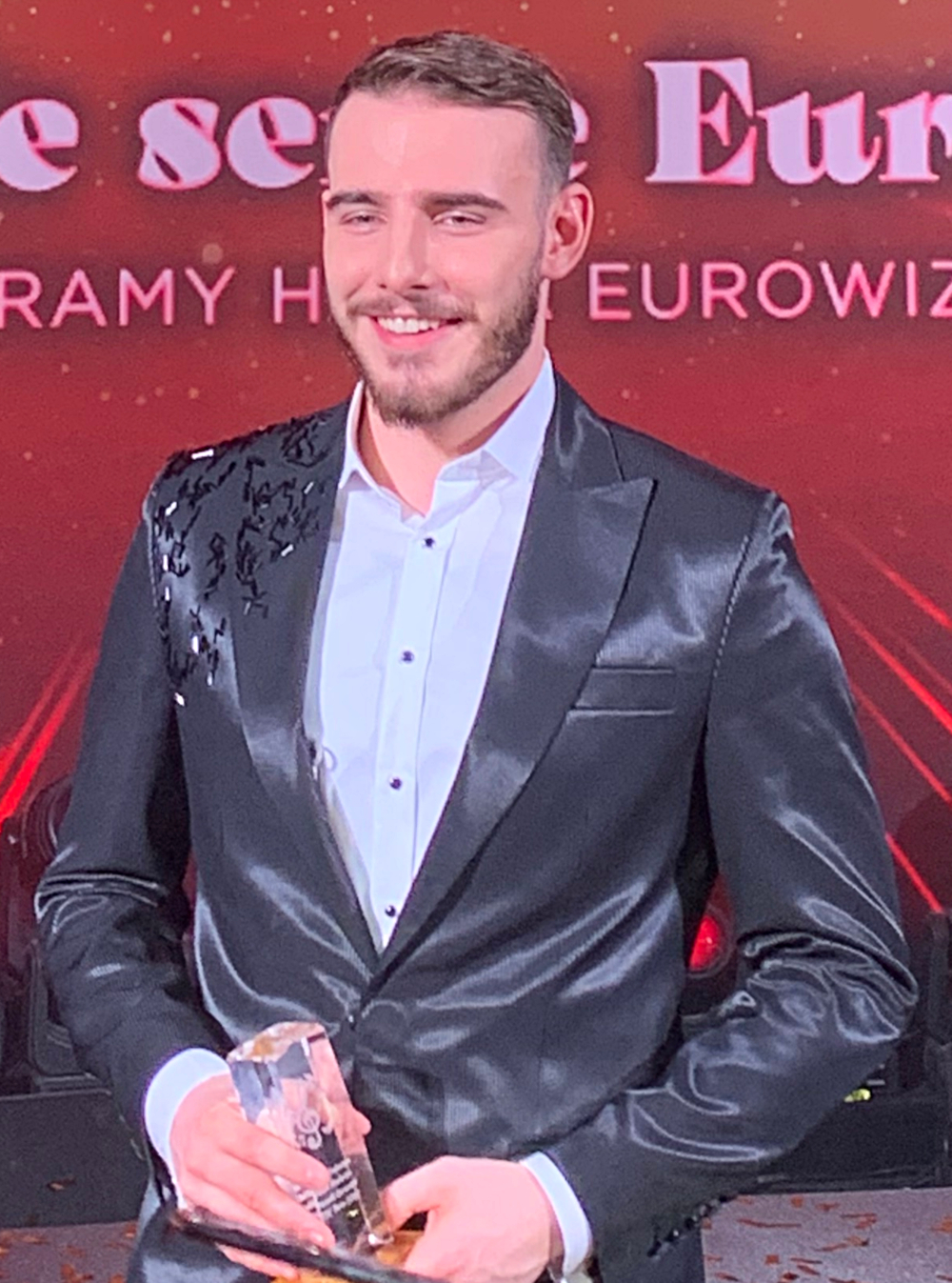
Krystian Ochman after winning Tu bije serce Europy! Wybieramy hit na Eurowizję!

Tu bije serce Europy! Wybieramy hit na Eurowizję! ("Here beats the heart of Europe! We're choosing the hit for Eurovision!") was the national final organised by TVP in order to select the Polish entry for the Eurovision Song Contest 2022. The show took place on 19 February 2022 at TVP studios 4 and 5 in Warsaw, and was hosted by 2021 Polish Eurovision entrant Rafał Brzozowski, Ida Nowakowska and Małgorzata Tomaszewska, with Aleksander Sikora and Marek Sierocki serving as backstage hosts. The show was broadcast on TVP2 and TVP Polonia as well as on TVP Rozrywka with presentation in sign language and online via the platform TVP VOD. The national final was watched according to the Real Viewership Model was 2.3 million people with a market share of 12.6%. According to Nielsen Audience Measurement, the show attracted 1.9 million viewers and an average viewership of 1.7 million.

==== Competing entries ====
TVP opened a submission period for interested artists and songwriters to submit their entries between 20 September 2021 and 20 November 2021. The broadcaster received 150 submissions at the closing of the deadline. A five-member selection committee consisting of Halina Frąckowiak (singer), Krystian Kruczkowski (programme director of TVP), Marcin Kusy (President of the Polish Radio Program I), Szymon Orłowski (musician and composer) and Marek Sierocki (music journalist and artistic director, Eurovision commentator for TVP) selected ten entries from the received submissions to compete in the national final. The selected entries were announced on 14 January 2022 during the TVP2 programme Pytanie na śniadanie. Among the competing artists was Lidia Kopania, who represented Poland in the Eurovision Song Contest 2009.

Artist	Song	Songwriter(s)
Ania Byrcyn	"Dokąd?"	Anna Gąsienica-Byrcyn
Daria	"Paranoia"	Daria Marcinkowska, Maciej Puchalski, Kevin Zuber, Duncan Townsend
Mila	"All I Need"	Emilia Dębska
Karolina Lizer	"Czysta woda"	Marcin Partyka, Tomasz Kordeusz
Karolina Stanisławczyk feat. Chika Toro	"Move"	Peter Macko, Karolina Stanisławczyk, Neidy Viviana, Toro Salazar
Kuba Szmajkowski	"Lovesick"	Dominic Buczkowski-Wojtaszek, Patryk Kumór, Jan Bielecki, Mateusz Dziewulski, Thomas Warlsson
Lidia Kopania	"Why Does It Hurt?"	Ylva Persson, Linda Persson, Rickard Bonde Truumeel
Krystian Ochman	"River"	Krystian Ochman, Ashley Hicklin, Adam Wiśniewski, Mikołaj Trybulec
Siostry Szlachta	"Drogowskazy"	Piotr Walicki, Monika Wydrzyńska
Unmute	"Głośniej niż decybele"	Michał Król, Michał Pakuła

==== Final ====
The final took place on 19 February 2022. Ten songs competed with the winner determined over two rounds of voting. In both rounds, each juror distributed 100 points among all competing entries, with the scores later converted into percentages and combined with the televote results to determine an average. In the event of a tie, the tie would be decided in favour of the jury. Three entries from the first round progressed to the superfinal, where "River" performed by Krystian Ochman was selected. The jury vote was won by Daria, while the televote was won by Krystian Ochman. The jury that voted during the show consisted of Halina Frąckowiak, Krystian Kruczkowski, Marcin Kusy, Szymon Orłowski and Marek Sierocki.

In addition to the performances of the competing entries, a tribute to late singer Krzysztof Prusik and Azerbaijani 2011 Eurovision winners Ell and Nikki opened the show, while former Polish Eurovision entrants Justyna Steczkowska (1995), Blue Café (2004), Kasia Moś (2017) and Rafał Brzozowski (2021), and former Polish Junior Eurovision entrants Viki Gabor (2019) and Sara James (2021) performed as the interval acts.

First round – 19 February 2022
R/O	Artist	Song	Percentage	Place	Result
1	Kuba Szmajkowski	"Lovesick"	4%	4	—N/a
2	Ania Byrcyn	"Dokąd?"	3%	6	—N/a
3	Siostry Szlachta	"Drogowskazy"	3%	7	—N/a
4	Lidia Kopania	"Why Does It Hurt?"	1%	10	—N/a
5	Karolina Stanisławczyk feat. Chika Toro	"Move"	2%	8	—N/a
6	Karolina Lizer	"Czysta woda"	3%	5	—N/a
7	Unmute	"Głośniej niż decybele"	—	—	Advanced
8	Mila	"All I Need"	1%	9	—N/a
9	Krystian Ochman	"River"	—	—	Advanced
10	Daria	"Paranoia"	—	—	Advanced

Superfinal – 19 February 2022
R/O	Artist	Song	Percentage	Place
1	Krystian Ochman	"River"	51%	1
2	Unmute	"Głośniej niż decybele"	10%	3
3	Daria	"Paranoia"	39%	2

=== Promotion ===
Ochman made several appearances across Europe to specifically promote "River" as the Polish Eurovision entry. On 3 April, Ochman performed during the London Eurovision Party, which was held at the Hard Rock Hotel in London, United Kingdom and hosted by Paddy O'Connell and SuRie. On 7 April, Ochman performed during the Israel Calling event held at the Menora Mivtachim Arena in Tel Aviv, Israel. On 9 April, Ochman performed during the Eurovision in Concert event which was held at the AFAS Live venue in Amsterdam, Netherlands and hosted by Cornald Maas and Edsilia Rombley. On 16 April, Ochman performed during the PrePartyES 2022 event which was held at the Sala La Riviera venue in Madrid, Spain and hosted by Ruth Lorenzo. In addition to his international appearances, Ochman recorded his 'live-on-tape' performance at the Studio 5 of TVP in Warsaw on 21 March. This would have been used in the event that he was unable to travel to Turin, or subjected to quarantine on arrival.

== At Eurovision ==
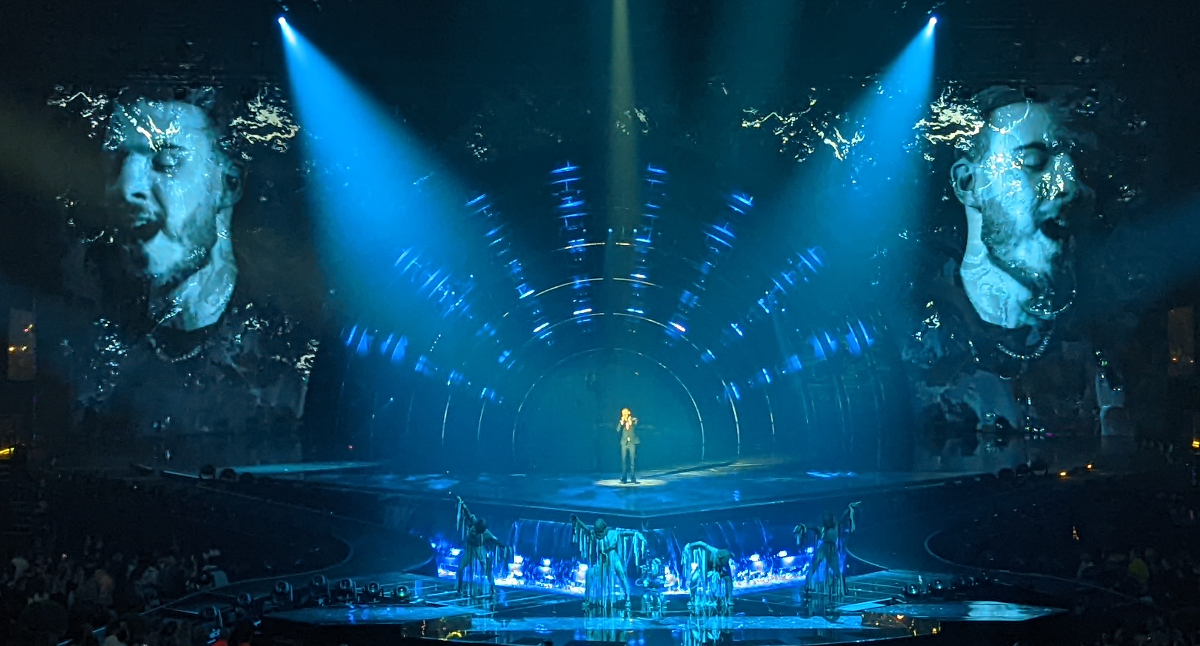
Ochman performing during the second semi-final

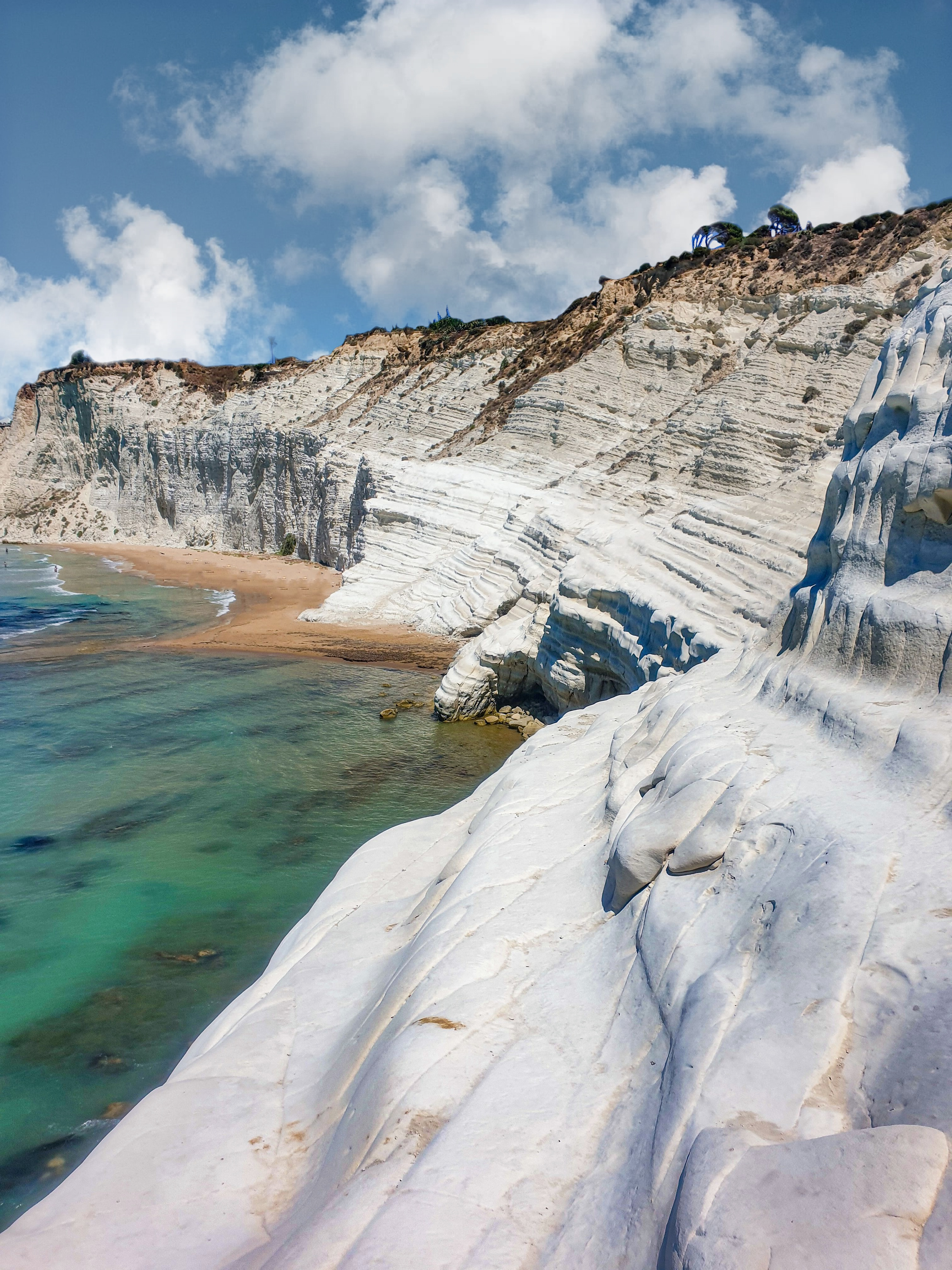
A video postcard introduced the Ochman's performance in the second semi-final and final of the Eurovision Song Contest 2022. The postcard was filmed on the Scala dei Turchi in the Province of Agrigento and featured virtual projections of Ochman across the location.

According to Eurovision rules, all nations with the exceptions of the host country and the "Big Five" (France, Germany, Italy, Spain and the United Kingdom) are required to qualify from one of two semi-finals in order to compete for the final; the top ten countries from each semi-final progress to the final. The European Broadcasting Union (EBU) split up the competing countries into six different pots based on voting patterns from previous contests, with countries with favourable voting histories put into the same pot. On 25 January 2022, an allocation draw was held which placed each country into one of the two semi-finals, as well as which half of the show they would perform in. Poland was placed into the second semi-final, held on 12 May 2022, and was scheduled to perform in the second half of the show.

During his performance, Ochman wore a black suit. He was joined by four contemporary dancers wearing all-black clothing and masks, described by the official Eurovision website as looking "like ghosts", giving the performance "a powerful, yet haunting visual". Ochman's performance featured flashing light effects, with predominantly dark blue staging. Ochman himself commented on the performance, saying: "The dancers are posing as demons. The whole concept of the song is getting to the moment of inner peace, but getting away from the noise and the demons". The predominant colour in the Polish performance was black and dark blue. The performance also featured visual effects, consisting of a storm-like overlay projected onscreen and sounds of rain hitting the ground, which was met with criticism from Polish Eurovision fans, who called them "unnecessary" and "kitschy". The performance also included other elements that were criticised, namely the idea of Ochman's face being projected on the back LED displays, as well as his suit.

Once all the competing songs for the 2022 contest had been released, the running order for the semi-finals was decided by the shows' producers rather than through another draw, so that similar songs were not placed next to each other. Poland was set to perform in position 14, following the entry from Romania and before the entry from Montenegro. Poland qualified for the final and was announced fourth. Shortly after the second semi-final, a winners' press conference was held for the ten qualifying countries. As part of this press conference, the qualifying artists took part in a draw to determine which half of the grand final they would subsequently participate in. This draw was done in the order the countries appeared in the semi-final running order. Poland was drawn to compete in the second half. Following this draw, the shows' producers decided upon the running order of the final, as they had done for the semi-finals. Poland was subsequently placed to perform in position 23, following the entry from the United Kingdom and before the entry from Serbia. In the grand final, Poland finished in position 12 with 151 points – the country's best placing since Michał Szpak's 8th place, achieved in 2016. Poland also managed to reach its best result in the semi-finals in the history of the country in the contest, having achieved 6th place with 198 points. Poland had also previously scored 6th in the semi-final in 2016, but received less points.

In Poland, all shows were broadcast on the television channels TVP1 and TVP Polonia, featuring commentary from Aleksander Sikora and Marek Sierocki. The Polish spokesperson, who announced the top 12-point score awarded by the Polish jury during the final, was Ida Nowakowska, who had previously announced the points for Poland in 2021. Controversy surrounded the point announcement as social media posts alleged that Nowakowska had performed a Nazi salute during her segment. That allegation was disproven by Reuters, which stated that Nowakowska hadn't done the salute, but instead showed a peace sign.

=== Voting ===
==== Points awarded to Poland ====
Points awarded to Poland (Semi-final 2)
Score	Televote	Jury
12 points	Belgium; Germany; Ireland	
10 points	United Kingdom	
8 points	Cyprus	Azerbaijan; Cyprus; Georgia; Israel; North Macedonia; San Marino
7 points	Czech Republic; Israel; Sweden	Spain
6 points	Australia; Estonia	Belgium; Malta; United Kingdom
5 points	Finland; San Marino	
4 points	Malta; Spain	
3 points	Georgia	Czech Republic; Montenegro; Serbia
2 points	Montenegro; North Macedonia	
1 point	Azerbaijan; Romania	Finland; Sweden

Points awarded to Poland (Final)
Score	Televote	Jury
12 points	Ukraine	
10 points	Ireland; United Kingdom	Greece
8 points	Germany	France; United Kingdom
7 points	Belgium; Czech Republic	
6 points	Netherlands	Israel
5 points	Norway; Sweden	
4 points	Austria; Denmark; France; Iceland; Montenegro	Malta; San Marino
3 points	Australia; Cyprus; Italy	
2 points	Malta	Azerbaijan; Georgia; North Macedonia
1 point	Azerbaijan; Israel; Spain; Switzerland	

==== Points awarded by Poland ====
Points awarded by Poland (Semi-final 2)
Score	Televote	Aggregated jury
12 points	Sweden	Sweden
10 points	Estonia	Australia
8 points	Czech Republic	Czech Republic
7 points	Serbia	Estonia
6 points	Finland	Belgium
5 points	Romania	North Macedonia
4 points	San Marino	Finland
3 points	Cyprus	Azerbaijan
2 points	Australia	San Marino
1 point	Belgium	Israel

Points awarded by Poland (Final)
Score	Televote	Aggregated jury
12 points	Ukraine	Ukraine
10 points	Sweden	Sweden
8 points	Estonia	United Kingdom
7 points	Moldova	Portugal
6 points	Spain	Australia
5 points	Serbia	Switzerland
4 points	Norway	Italy
3 points	United Kingdom	Netherlands
2 points	Lithuania	Greece
1 point	Portugal	Spain

==== Jury vote issues ====
In a statement released during the broadcast of the grand final, the EBU revealed that six countries, including Poland, were found to have irregular jury voting patterns during the second semi-final. Consequently, these countries were given substitute aggregated jury scores for both the second semi-final and the grand final (shown above), calculated from the corresponding jury scores of countries with historically similar voting patterns as determined by the pots for the semi-final allocation draw held in January. Their televoting scores were unaffected. The Flemish broadcaster VRT later reported that the juries involved had made agreements to vote for each other's entries to secure qualification to the grand final.

On 19 May, the EBU released a further statement clarifying the irregularities in voting patterns. This confirmed that the six countries involved had consistently scored each other's entries disproportionately highly in the second semi-final: the Polish jury, as well as the juries from Azerbaijan, Georgia, Montenegro, Romania and San Marino, had each ranked the other five countries' entries as their top five, proving beyond statistical coincidence that they had colluded to achieve a higher placing. This prompted the suspension of Poland's intended jury scores (shown below) in favour of the EBU's calculated aggregate scores, presented above. The Polish broadcaster TVP commented on the situation, strongly rejecting the accusations of vote manipulation and criticising the EBU's method of calculating the aggregate jury scores. The statement went on to request further transparency from the EBU over the issue.

The following members comprised the suspended Polish jury:

- Aleksandra Szwed
- Andrzej Jaworski
- Dagmara Jaworska
- Krystyna Giżowska
- Mikołaj Gąsiewski

Poland's suspended jury results (Semi-final 2)
Score	Country
12 points	San Marino
10 points	Azerbaijan
8 points	Romania
7 points	Montenegro
6 points	Sweden
5 points	Finland
4 points	Georgia
3 points	Estonia
2 points	Serbia
1 point	Australia

Detailed voting results of Poland's suspended vote (Semi-final 2)
R/O	Country	Juror 1	Juror 2	Juror 3	Juror 4	Juror 5	Rank	Points
01	Finland	3	8	8	5	13	6	5
02	Israel	15	16	12	14	14	17	
03	Serbia	7	7	5	13	12	9	2
04	Azerbaijan	5	3	3	2	1	2	10
05	Georgia	6	5	11	7	9	7	4
06	Malta	16	17	17	9	7	13	
07	San Marino	4	1	2	1	2	1	12
08	Australia	2	14	10	12	16	10	1
09	Cyprus	17	12	13	10	11	15	
10	Ireland	13	9	16	15	5	12	
11	North Macedonia	14	15	14	11	3	11	
12	Estonia	9	10	4	6	15	8	3
13	Romania	1	4	7	4	4	3	8
14	Poland							
15	Montenegro	8	2	1	8	6	4	7
16	Belgium	11	11	15	16	10	14	
17	Sweden	12	6	6	3	8	5	6
18	Czech Republic	10	13	9	17	17	16	

==== Detailed final results ====
Detailed voting results from Poland (Semi-final 2)
R/O	Country	Aggregated jury (Note: Poland was among the six countries whose jury results were found to have had irregular voting patterns. Their jury votes were substituted with aggregated jury results for the second semi-final and the final based on countries with similar voting patterns, as determined by the pots that the countries were put into for the semi-final allocation draw.)		Televote	
R/O	Country	Rank	Points	Rank	Points
01	Finland	7	4	5	6
02	Israel	10	1	12	
03	Serbia	14		4	7
04	Azerbaijan	8	3	16	
05	Georgia	12		14	
06	Malta	11		15	
07	San Marino	9	2	7	4
08	Australia	2	10	9	2
09	Cyprus	15		8	3
10	Ireland	13		11	
11	North Macedonia	6	5	13	
12	Estonia	4	7	2	10
13	Romania	16		6	5
14	Poland				
15	Montenegro	17		17	
16	Belgium	5	6	10	1
17	Sweden	1	12	1	12
18	Czech Republic	3	8	3	8

Detailed voting results from Poland (Final)
R/O	Country	Aggregated jury		Televote	
R/O	Country	Rank	Points	Rank	Points
01	Czech Republic	20		16	
02	Romania	21		15	
03	Portugal	4	7	10	1
04	Finland	16		11	
05	Switzerland	6	5	19	
06	France	22		18	
07	Norway	12		7	4
08	Armenia	17		17	
09	Italy	7	4	13	
10	Spain	10	1	5	6
11	Netherlands	8	3	12	
12	Ukraine	1	12	1	12
13	Germany	19		14	
14	Lithuania	14		9	2
15	Azerbaijan	13		21	
16	Belgium	15		22	
17	Greece	9	2	23	
18	Iceland	18		20	
19	Moldova	24		4	7
20	Sweden	2	10	2	10
21	Australia	5	6	24	
22	United Kingdom	3	8	8	3
23	Poland				
24	Serbia	23		6	5
25	Estonia	11		3	8
