= Yon Idy =

Macedonian singer and songwriter

- Born: Jon Ajdini; Skopje, North Macedonia
- Occupations: Singer; songwriter
- Musical career
- Genres: Indie pop; pop rock
- Instruments: Vocals; guitar

Jon Ajdini, known professionally as Yon Idy, is an Albanian singer and songwriter. He rose to prominence upon his debut single "Gentle", which reached number 12 in Albania. His success spawned four subsequent singles that attained chart success in the Albanian Top 100. Ajdini was shortlisted to compete at the Macedonian national selection, Za Evrosong 2022, to select the nation's representative for the Eurovision Song Contest 2022.

== Life and career ==
=== 2019–present: Formations and continued success ===
Yon Idy was born as Jon Ajdini into an Albanian family in the city of Skopje, North Macedonia. Featuring hip-hop, pop-rock and soul music, Ajdinis's debut single "Gentle" released in June 2019 peaked at number 12 in Albania. That year, "Walking the Line of Love" reached number 58 on the Albanian Top 100. His chart success followed into May 2020 with "Waste No Love", and his next single, "Back Around", peaked at number 35 in Albania. Another charting single, "Got Me All Down", was released in late 2020. In January 2022, the national broadcaster, Macedonian Radio Television (MRT), reported that Ajdini with his song "Dreams" was one of six artists shortlisted to compete at Za Evrosong 2022, the national selection competition for choosing the Macedonian representative at the Eurovision Song Contest 2022.

== Artistry ==
Ajdini is primarily characterised as an indie pop and pop rock artist fusioning various music genres, including hip-hop and soul music.

== Discography ==
=== Singles ===
==== As lead artist ====
Title	Year	Peak chart positions	Album
Title	Year	ALB	Album
"Gentle"	2019	12	Non-album singles
"Walking the Line of Love"	2019	58	Non-album singles
"Waste No Love"	2020	86	Non-album singles
"Back Around"	2020	35	Non-album singles
"Got Me All Down"	2020	57	Non-album singles
"My Fire"	2021	—	Non-album singles
"In Time"	2022	—	Non-album singles
"Dreams"	2022	—	Non-album singles
"—" denotes a recording that did not chart or was not released in that territory.
