= Circles (Andrea song) =

2022 single by Andrea

Single by Andrea
- Language: English
- Released: 17 January 2022
- Length: 3:00
- Songwriters: Aleksandar Masevski; Andrea Koevska

Music video
- "Circles" on YouTube

Eurovision Song Contest 2022 entry
- Country: North Macedonia
- Artist: Andrea
- Language: English
- Composer: Aleksandar Masevski
- Lyricists: Aleksandar Masevski; Andrea Koevska

Finals performance
- Semi-final result: 11th
- Semi-final points: 76

Entry chronology
- ◄ "Here I Stand" (2021)

"Circles" is a single by Macedonian singer Andrea. The song represented North Macedonia in the Eurovision Song Contest 2022 in Turin, Italy after winning Za Evrosong 2022, North Macedonia's national final.

== Background ==
According to Andrea during an interview at the London Eurovision Party, Andrea said, “[The emotions] are coming from deep within. Because, you know, I don’t like to expose that part of myself very often because it’s personal, you know. But I do like to share it when it’s time for people to feel less alone. So I think I captured that very good with the song because we’re all going through something, in a situation we don’t like and we can’t necessarily change it right away — it’s hard work and a process — but when we do, we feel better, we feel freer, and just happier in general.”

== Eurovision Song Contest 2022 ==
=== Za Evrosong 2022 ===
A submission period was opened for interested artists and composers to submit their entries between 10 December 2021 and 16 January 2022. MRT received 47 submissions at the closing of the deadline. Six entries were selected by a special jury from the submissions and were announced on 21 January 2022. The competing entries were released to the public on 28 January 2022.

The six competing artists and songs were presented to the public on 28 January 2022 during the MRT programme Stisni Plej. The public was able to vote online for their favorite entry until 4 February 2022. The final of Za Evrosong 2022 took place on 4 February 2022 at the MRT Studio 1 and was hosted by Jana Burčeska and Aleksandra Jovanovska. A 50/50 combination of the online vote and an international jury panel.

"Circles" would score 20 points, scoring 12 points from the jury and 8 points from the televote. While another competing song, "Superman" by Viktor Apostolovski would also score 20 points, "Circles" scored more points with the jury, with "Superman" only getting 8 from the jury. The song would win the contest, and as a result, represented Macedonia at the Eurovision Song Contest 2022.

=== "Turquoise Carpet" incident ===
During the opening ceremony of the contest, which famously includes a turquoise carpet, Andrea was filmed throwing the flag of North Macedonia across the floor. MRT, the nation broadcaster of North Macedonia, heavily criticised the action and issued a statement, where the broadcaster said they were considering withdrawing Andrea from the competition.

Andrea later apologised for the action and explained that her delegation simply was too far away to take the flag, and, due to press photographs being taken, decided to throw the flag as the fastest solution. In a video, she stated: "I wasn't intending at all to offend someone and if I did that, I apologise. I carry the flag with me everywhere I go and I hope we can really cross this."

=== At Eurovision ===
According to Eurovision rules, all nations with the exceptions of the host country and the "Big Five" (France, Germany, Italy, Spain and the United Kingdom) are required to qualify from one of two semi-finals in order to compete for the final; the top ten countries from each semi-final progress to the final. The European Broadcasting Union (EBU) split up the competing countries into six different pots based on voting patterns from previous contests, with countries with favourable voting histories put into the same pot. On 25 January 2022, an allocation draw was held which placed each country into one of the two semi-finals, as well as which half of the show they would perform in. North Macedonia was placed into the second semi-final, held on 12 May 2022, and performed in the second half of the show, in 11th place out of 18.
