= Spain in the Eurovision Song Contest 2022 =

- Eurovision Song Contest 2022
- Participating broadcaster: Radiotelevisión Española (RTVE)
- Country: Spain
- Selection process: Benidorm Fest 2022
- Selection date: 29 January 2022

Competing entry
- Song: "SloMo"
- Artist: Chanel
- Songwriters: Leroy Sanchez; Keith Harris; Ibere Fortes; Maggie Szabo; Arjen Thonen

Placement
- Final result: 3rd, 459 points

Participation chronology

Spain was represented at the Eurovision Song Contest 2022 with the song "SloMo", written by Leroy Sanchez, Keith Harris, Ibere Fortes, Maggie Szabo, and Arjen Thonen, and performed by Chanel. The Spanish participating broadcaster, Radiotelevisión Española (RTVE), together with the Generalitat Valenciana, organised Benidorm Fest 2022 in order to select its entry for the 2022 contest. Benidorm Fest consisted of two semi-finals on 26 and 27 January and the final on 29 January 2022. A total of thirteen artists and songs competed, and the winner was determined by a combination of votes from an expert jury, a demoscopic panel and a televote.

As part of the "Big Five", Spain directly qualified to compete in the final of the Eurovision Song Contest. Performing during the show in position 10, "SloMo" eventually finished in third place with 459 points. Chanel became the highest scoring Spanish Eurovision entrant and scored Spain its best result since 1995.

== Background ==
Prior to the 2022 contest, Televisión Española (TVE) until 2006, and Radiotelevisión Española (RTVE) since 2007, had participated in the Eurovision Song Contest representing Spain sixty times since TVE's first entry in 1961. They have won the contest on two occasions: in 1968 with the song "La, la, la" performed by Massiel and in 1969 with the song "Vivo cantando" performed by Salomé, the latter having won in a four-way tie with France, the Netherlands, and the United Kingdom. They have also finished second four times, with "En un mundo nuevo" by Karina in 1971, "Eres tú" by Mocedades in 1973, "Su canción" by Betty Missiego in 1979, and "Vuelve conmigo" by Anabel Conde in 1995. In 2021, RTVE placed twenty-fourth with the song "Voy a quedarme" performed by Blas Cantó.

As part of its duties as participating broadcaster, RTVE organises the selection of its entry in the Eurovision Song Contest and broadcasts the event in the country. RTVE confirmed their intentions to participate at the 2022 contest on 3 June 2021. In 2021, RTVE selected the artist that would compete at the Eurovision Song Contest via an internal selection, while the song was selected via a national final. For their 2022 entry, the broadcaster announced on 22 July 2021 that it would organise a national final based on the former Benidorm International Song Festival in collaboration with the Generalitat Valenciana, which would feature a competition among several artists and songs.

== Before Eurovision ==
=== Benidorm Fest 2022 ===
Benidorm Fest 2022 was the inaugural edition of Benidorm Fest, the song festival organised by RTVE and Generalitat Valenciana to select the Spanish entry for the Eurovision Song Contest 2022. The event took place at the Palau Municipal d'Esports l'Illa de Benidorm in Benidorm, Valencian Community, hosted by Alaska, Inés Hernand, and Máximo Huerta. Thirteen (originally fourteen) artists and songs competed over three shows: two semi-finals on 26 and 27 January 2022 and the final on 29 January 2022.

The semi-finals were broadcast on two consecutive nights of the same week, and the voting consisted of voting system consisted the televote (50%), a demoscopic panel of judges made up of a sample of the Spanish population selected by statistical and demoscopic criteria (25%), and a national and international jury vote (50%).

==== Semi-finals ====
- The first semi-final took place on 26 January 2022, with six acts taking part. "SloMo" performed by Chanel, "Terra" performed by Tanxugueiras, "Secreto de agua" performed by Blanca Paloma and "Raffaella" performed by Varry Brava advanced to the final, while "Postureo" performed by Azúcar Moreno and "Mejores" performed by Unique were eliminated. Luna Ki, who was set to compete with "Voy a morir", had withdrawn from the competition due to a combination of personal issues and the inability to use autotune under Eurovision rules.
- The second semi-final took place on 27 January 2022, with seven acts taking part. "Ay mamá" performed by Rigoberta Bandini, "Calle de la llorería" performed by Rayden, "Eco" performed by Xeinn and "Quién lo diría" performed by Gonzalo Hermida advanced to the final, while "Sigues en mi mente" performed by Marta Sango, "Culpa" performed by Javiera Mena and "Make You Say" performed by Sara Deop were eliminated.

==== Final ====
The final took place on 29 January 2022 and consisted of the eight entries that qualified from the two preceding semi-finals.

Final – 29 January 2022
R/O	Artist	Song	Expert jury	Demoscopic jury	Televote	Total	Place
1	Rayden	"Calle de la llorería"	37	15	15	67	4
2	Tanxugueiras	"Terra"	30	30	30	90	3
3	Varry Brava	"Raffaella"	25	12	18	55	6
4	Chanel	"SloMo"	51	25	20	96	1
5	Rigoberta Bandini	"Ay mamá"	46	20	25	91	2
6	Xeinn	"Eco"	30	5	10	45	7
7	Gonzalo Hermida (Note: Following a positive COVID-19 test result, in accordance with the event's protocols, Hermida competed using the music video of the song.)	"Quién lo diría"	12	18	5	35	8
8	Blanca Paloma	"Secreto de agua"	39	10	12	61	5

=== Preparations and promotion ===
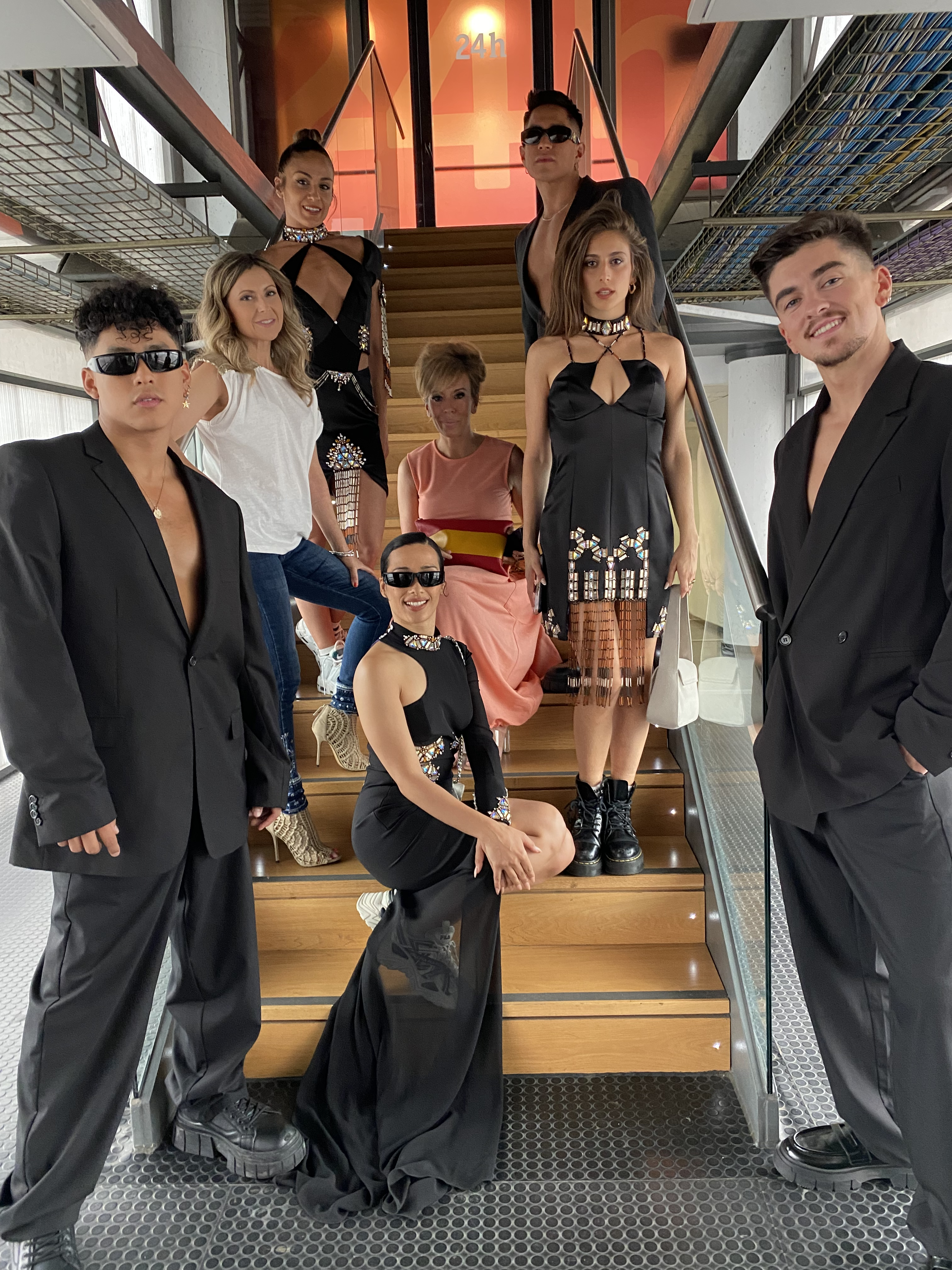
Chanel, Eva Mora, (Note: Head of Delegation) María Eizaguirre, (Note: Director of Communication and Participation of RTVE) and dancers: Exon Arcos, Josh Huerta, Pol Soto, Raquel Caurín, and Ría Pérez.

The stage director for the Spanish performance was Kyle Hanagami. Chanel was accompanied on stage by five dancers: Exon Arcos, Josh Huerta, Pol Soto, Raquel Caurín and María Pérez.

A music video for "SloMo" premiered on the official YouTube channel of the Eurovision Song Contest on 15 March 2022. Prior to the contest, Chanel made appearances across Europe to specifically promote "SloMo" as the Spanish Eurovision entry. She first performed at the Barcelona Eurovision Party, which was held on 26 March 2022 at Barcelona's Sala Apolo, and later performed at the London Eurovision Party, which was held on 3 April 2022 at London's Hard Rock Hotel venue. She also performed in the Eurovision in Concert at Amsterdam's AFAS Live on 9 April, and the PrePartyES which took place in Madrid's Sala La Riviera on 16 April.

=== Send-off ceremony ===
On 27 April, RTVE prepared a farewell ceremony for the Spanish representative to the Eurovision Song Contest 2022. The ceremony was organized in the Cines Callao in Madrid. Prior to the event, a live stream on RTVE Play followed a press conference hosted by the Director of Communication and Participation of RTVE, María Eizaguirre, in which Chanel shared her final thoughts before making the trip to Turin with fans and journalists. She was joined by the Spanish Head of Delegation, Eva Mora; the spokesperson of the Spanish jury for Eurovision 2022, Nieves Álvarez; and the Spanish Eurovision commentators, Julia Varela and Tony Aguilar. Tickets for the event were sold the day before at the RTVE facilities in Torrespaña: two individual tickets were given to each person who attended.

== At Eurovision ==
According to Eurovision rules, all nations with the exceptions of the host country and the "Big Five" (France, Germany, Italy, Spain and the United Kingdom) are required to qualify from one of two semi-finals in order to compete for the final; the top ten countries from each semi-final progress to the final. As a member of the "Big Five", Spain automatically qualified to compete in the final on 14 May 2022. Spain was set to perform in the first half of the final. In addition to its participation in the final, Spain was also required to broadcast and vote in one of the two semi-finals. This was decided via a draw held during the semi-final allocation draw on 25 January 2022, when it was announced that Spain would be voting in the second semi-final.

In Spain, TVE broadcast all three shows on La 1 with commentary by Tony Aguilar and Julia Varela; in addition, Radio Nacional de España (RNE) aired the final on Radio Nacional, with commentary by Imanol Durán, Sara Calvo, and David Asensio; with all the shows also broadcast internationally on TVE Internacional, and both television and radio broadcasts available online via RTVE Play. The final was screened live in cinemas across the country due to an agreement with cinema chain Cinesa. RTVE appointed Nieves Álvarez as its spokesperson to announce during the final the top 12-point score awarded by the Spanish jury.

=== Voting ===
Voting during the three shows involved each country awarding two sets of points from 1-8, 10 and 12: one from their professional jury and the other from televoting. Each participating broadcaster assembles a five-member jury panel consisting of music industry professionals who are citizens of the country they represent, with a diversity in gender and age represented. The judges assess each entry based on the performances during the second Dress Rehearsal of each show, which takes place the night before each live show, against a set of criteria including: vocal capacity; the stage performance; the song's composition and originality; and the overall impression by the act. Jury members may only take part in panel once every three years, and are obliged to confirm that they are not connected to any of the participating acts in a way that would impact their ability to vote impartially. Jury members should also vote independently, with no discussion of their vote permitted with other jury members. The exact composition of the professional jury, and the results of each country's jury and televoting were released after the grand final; the individual results from each jury member were also released in an anonymised form.

Below is a breakdown of points awarded to Spain and awarded by Spain in the second semi-final and grand final of the contest, and the breakdown of the jury voting and televoting conducted during the two shows:

==== Points awarded to Spain ====
Points awarded to Spain (Final)
Score	Televote	Jury
12 points	Greece	Armenia; Australia; Ireland; Malta; North Macedonia; Portugal; San Marino; Sweden
10 points	Azerbaijan; North Macedonia; Portugal; San Marino; Serbia	Belgium; United Kingdom
8 points	Armenia; Bulgaria; Cyprus; Israel; Moldova; Montenegro; Romania	Bulgaria; Germany; Montenegro; Switzerland
7 points	Albania; Croatia; France; Malta; Netherlands	Czech Republic; Norway
6 points	Australia; Belgium; Czech Republic; Georgia; Lithuania; Poland; Switzerland	Croatia; Cyprus
5 points	Ireland; United Kingdom	Albania; Azerbaijan; France; Georgia; Greece; Lithuania; Netherlands
4 points	Latvia; Slovenia	Denmark; Serbia
3 points	Finland; Iceland	Iceland; Israel; Moldova
2 points	Germany; Sweden	Austria
1 point	Austria; Denmark; Estonia; Norway; Ukraine	Poland; Romania; Slovenia

==== Points awarded by Spain ====
Points awarded by Spain (Semi-final 2)
Score	Televote	Jury
12 points	Romania	Azerbaijan
10 points	Czech Republic	Australia
8 points	Sweden	Belgium
7 points	Ireland	Poland
6 points	Finland	Sweden
5 points	Serbia	Serbia
4 points	Poland	Romania
3 points	San Marino	Israel
2 points	Estonia	Finland
1 point	Cyprus	Montenegro

Points awarded by Spain (Final)
Score	Televote	Jury
12 points	Ukraine	Azerbaijan
10 points	Romania	Italy
8 points	United Kingdom	Australia
7 points	Moldova	Sweden
6 points	Sweden	Serbia
5 points	Italy	Belgium
4 points	Portugal	Romania
3 points	Norway	United Kingdom
2 points	Serbia	Greece
1 point	Poland	Switzerland

==== Detailed voting results ====
The following members comprised the Spanish jury:

- Blanca Paloma – scenographer, singer, finalist at Benidorm Fest 2022, and would represent Spain in 2023
- Carlos Marco – singer, songwriter, vocal coach
- Kai Etxaniz – singer, songwriter
- Pilar Tabares – television director
- Verónica Ferreiro – singer, songwriter

Detailed voting results from Spain (Semi-final 2)
R/O	Country	Jury							Televote	
R/O	Country	Juror A	Juror B	Juror C	Juror D	Juror E	Rank	Points	Rank	Points
01	Finland	7	7	16	6	10	9	2	5	6
02	Israel	6	8	11	4	17	8	3	13	
03	Serbia	5	6	9	7	6	6	5	6	5
04	Azerbaijan	1	1	1	5	1	1	12	16	
05	Georgia	18	17	15	12	11	15		15	
06	Malta	12	16	10	11	16	14		14	
07	San Marino	13	15	14	18	18	18		8	3
08	Australia	2	2	2	1	5	2	10	11	
09	Cyprus	17	18	12	16	14	17		10	1
10	Ireland	16	14	13	15	15	16		4	7
11	North Macedonia	9	12	17	14	12	13		18	
12	Estonia	10	9	8	17	9	12		9	2
13	Romania	8	10	3	9	8	7	4	1	12
14	Poland	4	5	4	8	4	4	7	7	4
15	Montenegro	15	13	18	3	13	10	1	17	
16	Belgium	3	3	5	2	3	3	8	12	
17	Sweden	11	4	6	10	2	5	6	3	8
18	Czech Republic	14	11	7	13	7	11		2	10

Detailed voting results from Spain (Final)
R/O	Country	Jury							Televote	
R/O	Country	Juror 1	Juror 2	Juror 3	Juror 4	Juror 5	Rank	Points	Rank	Points
01	Czech Republic	12	11	13	16	22	18		19	
02	Romania	5	12	14	2	14	7	4	2	10
03	Portugal	6	15	12	7	21	12		7	4
04	Finland	18	18	8	17	15	17		14	
05	Switzerland	7	19	3	18	13	10	1	22	
06	France	21	23	20	21	18	22		13	
07	Norway	20	22	21	20	11	21		8	3
08	Armenia	19	21	18	9	20	19		11	
09	Italy	4	3	4	6	4	2	10	6	5
10	Spain									
11	Netherlands	17	20	19	12	8	16		17	
12	Ukraine	22	13	23	14	19	20		1	12
13	Germany	13	17	17	5	23	14		16	
14	Lithuania	16	10	11	19	6	13		12	
15	Azerbaijan	1	1	1	1	3	1	12	23	
16	Belgium	3	8	5	15	7	6	5	18	
17	Greece	15	7	10	3	17	9	2	21	
18	Iceland	24	16	22	24	24	23		24	
19	Moldova	23	24	24	23	16	24		4	7
20	Sweden	2	2	9	4	12	4	7	5	6
21	Australia	8	5	2	8	2	3	8	20	
22	United Kingdom	9	6	16	10	5	8	3	3	8
23	Poland	10	9	7	13	9	11		10	1
24	Serbia	11	4	6	22	1	5	6	9	2
25	Estonia	14	14	15	11	10	15		15	

== After Eurovision ==
Spain received at least one point from every country in the Eurovision Song Contest except for Italy. For the first time in its participation history, Spain received the most sets of twelve points from the national juries, tied with the United Kingdom with eight sets of maximum points. The long-awaited success of Spain in the Eurovision Song Contest 2022 was greeted with enthusiasm across Spain, with deputy prime ministers Nadia Calviño and Yolanda Díaz and opposition leader Alberto Núñez Feijóo among others congratulating Chanel for her performance and result. An average of 6.8 million viewers watched the final, with a peak of 8.853 million during the voting sequence. This equaled a 50.8% share of the market over the four hours of the final, an increase of 21.4 points from the previous edition. On 15 May, the day after the final, a reception event was organized at the Plaza Mayor in Madrid, where Chanel was greeted by a full crowd. On 17 May, Chanel received a congratulation letter from King Felipe VI and Queen Letizia of Spain.
