= North Macedonia in the Eurovision Song Contest 2022 =

- Eurovision Song Contest 2022
- Participating broadcaster: Macedonian Radio Television (MRT)
- Country: North Macedonia
- Selection process: Za Evrosong 2022
- Selection date: 4 February 2022

Competing entry
- Song: "Circles"
- Artist: Andrea
- Songwriters: Aleksandar Masevski; Andrea Koevska

Placement
- Semi-final result: Failed to qualify (11th)

Participation chronology

North Macedonia was represented at the Eurovision Song Contest 2022 with the song "Circles", written by Aleksandar Masevski and Andrea Koevska, and performed by Andrea herself. The Macedonian participating broadcaster, Macedonian Radio Television (MRT), organised the national final Za Evrosong 2022 in order to select its entry for the contest. Six entries competed in the national final and "Circles" performed by Andrea was announced as the winner on 4 February 2022 following the combination of votes from a five-member international jury panel and a public vote.

North Macedonia was drawn to compete in the second semi-final of the Eurovision Song Contest which took place on 12 May 2022. Performing during the show in position 11, "Circles" was not announced among the top 10 entries of the second semi-final and therefore did not qualify to compete in the final. It was later revealed that North Macedonia placed eleventh out of the 18 participating countries in the semi-final with 76 points.

== Background ==
Prior to the 2022 contest, Macedonian Radio Television (MRT) had participated in the Eurovision Song Contest representing North Macedonia twenty times since its first entry in 1998 under the provisional appellation "former Yugoslav Republic of Macedonia", abbreviated "FYR Macedonia". Their best result in the contest to this point was seventh, achieved in 2019 with the song "Proud" performed by Tamara Todevska. Following the introduction of semi-finals in 2004, North Macedonia had featured in only six finals.

As part of its duties as participating broadcaster, MRT organises the selection of its entry in the Eurovision Song Contest and broadcasts the event in the country. The broadcaster confirmed its intentions to participate at the 2022 contest on 20 October 2021. Between 2008 and 2011, MRT selected its entries using the national final Skopje Fest. During this period, they failed to qualify to the final on every occasion. Between 2012 and 2014, the broadcaster internally selected its entry, resulting in a single qualification to the final during this period, in 2012. After failing to qualify in 2015 where Skopje Fest was used as a national final, the broadcaster internally selected its entry between 2016 and 2021, resulting in a single qualification to the final during this period in 2019. For 2022, the broadcaster returned to using a national final to select the entry.

== Before Eurovision ==
=== Za Evrosong 2022 ===
Za Evrosong 2022 was a song contest organised by MRT to select its entry for the Eurovision Song Contest 2022. Six entries participated in the competition which consisted of two shows on 28 January 2022 and 4 February 2022. Both shows took place during the MRT 1 programme Stisni Plej, hosted by Aleksandra Jovanovska and Jana Burčeska (who represented Macedonia in 2017).

==== Competing entries ====
A submission period was opened for interested artists and composers to submit their songs between 10 December 2021 and 16 January 2022. MRT received 47 submissions at the closing of the deadline and six entries were selected by a seven-member committee consisting of Meri Popova (MRT 1), Zoran Mirčevski (MR 2), Biljana Nikolovska (MR 1), Aleksandra Jovanovska (MR 2), Jana Burčeska (MRT 3), Maja Trpčanovska (MRT 1) and Ardita Imeri (MRT 2). The six competing artists and songs were announced on 21 January 2022.

==== Final ====
The six competing entries were presented to the public during the first show on 28 January 2022 and the public was able to vote online on the broadcaster's official Eurovision Song Contest website evrovizija.mrt.com.mk until 4 February 2022. A 50/50 combination of the online vote and a five-member international jury panel selected "Circles" performed by Andrea as the winner, which was announced during the second show on 4 February. The international jury panel consisted of Gordon Bonello (Maltese TV producer and journalist), Tali Eshkoli (music critique and Head of Delegation for Israel), Natia Mshvenieradze (TV producer and Head of Delegation for Georgia), Felix Bergsson (writer, actor and Head of Delegation for Iceland) and David Tserunyan (TV producer and Head of Delegation for Armenia). A monetary prize of €2,000 was also awarded to the winner. In addition to the announcement of the winner, the show featured guest appearances by Tamara Todevska (who represented North Macedonia in 2019) and Dajte Muzika (who represented North Macedonia in Junior Eurovision 2021).

Artist	Song	Songwriter(s)	Jury		Televote		Total	Place
Artist	Song	Songwriter(s)	Votes	Points	Votes	Points	Total	Place
Andrea	"Circles"	Aleksandar Masevski, Andrea Koevska	10	12	4,300	8	20	1
Kaly	"Love and Light"	Davor Jordanovski, Vesna Malinova	22	6	7,539	10	16	3
Lara Ivanova	"Flower of Sorrow"	Robert Bilbilov, Robin Zimbakov	12	10	1,186	5	15	4
Ris Flower	"Flying to Berlin"	Boris Cvetanovski	24	5	1,367	6	11	6
Viktor Apostolovski	"Superman"	Vladimir Dojcinovski, Viktor Apostolovski	16	8	12,621	12	20	2
Yon Idy	"Dreams"	Jon Ajdini	21	7	3,743	7	14	5

Detailed international jury votes
Song	Gordon Bonello	Tali Eshkoli	Natia Mshvenieradze	Felix Bergsson	David Tserunyan	Total
Song	MLT	ISR	GEO	ISL	ARM	Total
"Circles"	1	5	1	2	1	10
"Love and Light"	4	3	6	4	5	22
"Flower of Sorrow"	2	2	5	1	2	12
"Flying to Berlin"	6	4	3	5	6	24
"Superman"	3	1	2	6	4	16
"Dreams”	5	6	4	3	3	21

=== Preparation ===
On 5 February, MRT announced that "Circles" would undergo a production revamp for the Eurovision Song Contest as a part of the €2,000 budget allocated by the broadcaster. The official music video for the song was released on 10 March via the official Eurovision Song Contest's YouTube channel.

=== Promotion ===
Andrea made several appearances across Europe to specifically promote "Circles" as North Macedonia's Eurovision entry. On 4 March, Andrea appeared during the presentation show of the Montenegrin entry, Montenegro, dodici punti. On 5 March, Andrea presented the revamped version of "Circles" for the first time during the final of the Romanian national final. On 3 April, Andrea performed during the London Eurovision Party, which was held at the Hard Rock Hotel in London, United Kingdom, and hosted by Paddy O'Connell and SuRie. On 7 April, Andrea performed during the Israel Calling event held at the Menora Mivtachim Arena in Tel Aviv, Israel. On 16 April, Andrea performed during the PrePartyES 2022 event which was held at the Sala La Riviera venue in Madrid, Spain, and hosted by Ruth Lorenzo.

== At Eurovision ==
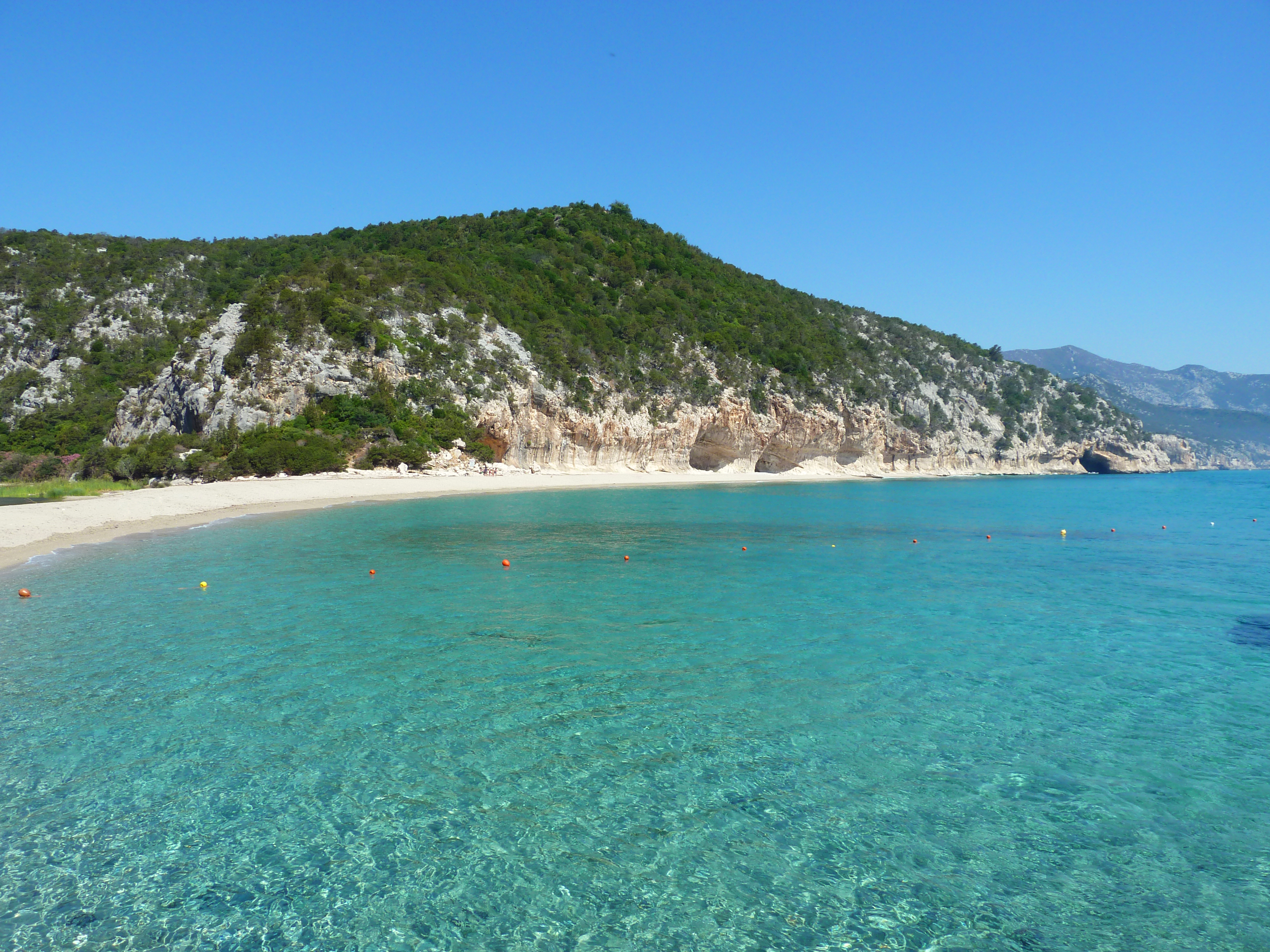
A video postcard introduced Andrea's performance in the second semi-final of the Eurovision Song Contest 2022. The postcard was filmed at the Cala Luna in the Province of Nuoro in Sardinia and featured virtual projections of Andrea across the location.

According to Eurovision rules, all nations with the exceptions of the host country and the "Big Five" (France, Germany, Italy, Spain and the United Kingdom) are required to qualify from one of two semi-finals in order to compete for the final. The top ten countries from each semi-final progress to the final. The European Broadcasting Union (EBU) split up the competing countries into six different pots based on voting patterns from previous contests, with countries with favourable voting histories put into the same pot. On 25 January 2022, an allocation draw was held which placed each country into one of the two semi-finals, as well as which half of the show they would perform in. North Macedonia was placed into the second semi-final, to be held on 12 May 2022, and was scheduled to perform in the second half of the show.

Once all the competing songs for the 2022 contest had been released, the running order for the semi-finals was decided by the shows' producers rather than through another draw, so that similar songs were not placed next to each other. North Macedonia was set to perform in position 11, following the entry from Ireland and before the entry from Estonia.

The two semi-finals and final were broadcast in North Macedonia on MRT 1 and MRT 2 with commentary by Eli Tanaskovska. MRT appointed Jana Burčeska, who hosted the national final and represented Macedonia in 2017, as its spokesperson to announce the top 12-point score awarded by the Macedonian jury during the final.

=== Flag incident ===
During the "Turquoise Carpet" event which preceded the Opening Ceremony of the contest on 8 May 2022, Andrea was seen throwing the flag of North Macedonia onto the floor during a photoshoot with the press. MRT later published a statement condemning her action, describing it as "desecration of a national symbol, which is punishable by Macedonian law". The broadcaster also threatened to withdraw Andrea from the contest. Andrea immediately issued a statement on national television, apologising for her actions and stating that she simply meant to hand the flag to a member of the delegation, who was too far away. MRT later stated on 11 May that they would take all disciplinary measures after the delegation returns from Turin, while also raising the possibility that they would not return for the 2023 contest due to the negative publicity caused by the incident.

=== Semi-final ===
Andrea took part in technical rehearsals on 3 and 6 May, followed by dress rehearsals on 11 and 12 May. This included the jury show on 11 May where the professional juries of each country watched and voted on the competing entries.

The Macedonian performance featured Andrea performing alone on stage in a black silk-lined coat with a crop top and black leather boots. The stage colours were predominately gold with the background LED screens displaying sun patterns and the LED floor displaying a spiral effect involving pieces whirling around in a circle towards the climax of the performance. Panels towards the front of the stage were also used which displayed handprints. Andrea was also joined by two off-stage backing vocalists: Renata Kralevska and Ana Petanovska.

At the end of the show, North Macedonia was not announced among the top 10 entries in the second semi-final and therefore failed to qualify to compete in the final. It was later revealed that North Macedonia placed eleventh in the semi-final, receiving a total of 76 points: 20 points from the televoting and 56 points from the juries.

=== Voting ===
Below is a breakdown of points awarded to North Macedonia in the second semi-final. Voting during the three shows involved each country awarding two sets of points from 1-8, 10 and 12: one from their professional jury and the other from televoting. The exact composition of the professional jury, and the results of each country's jury and televoting were released after the final; the individual results from each jury member were also released in an anonymised form. The Macedonian jury consisted of Agni Avshar, Andrijana Jovanovska, Ivan Petrovski, Nikola Micevski and Yon Idy. In the second semi-final, North Macedonia placed 11th with 76 points, just one spot from qualifying. North Macedonia also received twelve points in the jury vote from Germany. Over the course of the contest, North Macedonia awarded its 12 points to Serbia (in both the jury and televote) in the second semi-final, and to Spain (jury) and Serbia (televote) in the final.

==== Points awarded to North Macedonia ====
Points awarded to North Macedonia (Semi-final 2)
Score	Televote	Jury
12 points		Germany
10 points	Montenegro	Czech Republic
8 points	Serbia	
7 points		Australia; United Kingdom
6 points		
5 points		Malta; Poland; Romania
4 points		
3 points		
2 points	Czech Republic	Finland
1 point		Ireland; Montenegro; Serbia

==== Points awarded by North Macedonia ====
Points awarded by North Macedonia (Semi-final 2)
Score	Televote	Jury
12 points	Serbia	Serbia
10 points	Montenegro	Belgium
8 points	Finland	Poland
7 points	Sweden	Sweden
6 points	Czech Republic	Malta
5 points	Cyprus	Australia
4 points	Belgium	Finland
3 points	Malta	Montenegro
2 points	Poland	Estonia
1 point	Estonia	Azerbaijan

Points awarded by North Macedonia (Final)
Score	Televote	Jury
12 points	Serbia	Spain
10 points	Spain	Serbia
8 points	Ukraine	United Kingdom
7 points	Moldova	Italy
6 points	Italy	Sweden
5 points	Czech Republic	Australia
4 points	Sweden	Azerbaijan
3 points	Estonia	Belgium
2 points	Norway	Poland
1 point	Lithuania	Switzerland

==== Detailed voting results ====
The following members comprised the Macedonian jury:

- Agni Avshar – singer-songwriter
- Andrijana Jovanovska – music producer, songwriter
- Ivan Petrovski – singer-songwriter
- Nikola Micevski – journalist, TV presenter
- Yon Idy – singer-songwriter, participated in Macedonian selection for Eurovision 2022

Detailed voting results from North Macedonia (Semi-final 2)
R/O	Country	Jury							Televote	
R/O	Country	Juror 1	Juror 2	Juror 3	Juror 4	Juror 5	Rank	Points	Rank	Points
01	Finland	16	16	3	3	6	7	4	3	8
02	Israel	14	7	6	7	16	11		13	
03	Serbia	1	11	1	1	9	1	12	1	12
04	Azerbaijan	7	14	7	6	14	10	1	16	
05	Georgia	10	13	16	12	11	15		17	
06	Malta	2	3	12	11	4	5	6	8	3
07	San Marino	17	17	17	15	5	14		15	
08	Australia	3	1	9	13	15	6	5	14	
09	Cyprus	11	12	14	14	17	17		6	5
10	Ireland	15	8	15	16	12	16		11	
11	North Macedonia									
12	Estonia	12	9	11	5	7	9	2	10	1
13	Romania	13	10	10	17	10	13		12	
14	Poland	4	2	4	8	3	3	8	9	2
15	Montenegro	6	5	5	10	13	8	3	2	10
16	Belgium	5	4	2	4	2	2	10	7	4
17	Sweden	9	6	8	2	1	4	7	4	7
18	Czech Republic	8	15	13	9	8	12		5	6

Detailed voting results from North Macedonia (Final)
R/O	Country	Jury							Televote	
R/O	Country	Juror 1	Juror 2	Juror 3	Juror 4	Juror 5	Rank	Points	Rank	Points
01	Czech Republic	25	17	10	20	19	22		6	5
02	Romania	10	10	14	19	13	19		13	
03	Portugal	23	18	17	5	14	15		17	
04	Finland	24	25	6	12	17	18		15	
05	Switzerland	14	6	18	10	5	10	1	18	
06	France	15	16	23	17	22	24		19	
07	Norway	12	22	15	24	16	23		9	2
08	Armenia	21	11	16	16	10	21		21	
09	Italy	11	21	3	15	1	4	7	5	6
10	Spain	5	1	1	2	2	1	12	2	10
11	Netherlands	17	14	19	8	15	20		14	
12	Ukraine	13	19	12	21	4	12		3	8
13	Germany	20	7	24	11	7	13		20	
14	Lithuania	18	20	9	14	9	17		10	1
15	Azerbaijan	6	12	11	3	25	7	4	24	
16	Belgium	16	13	5	9	6	8	3	16	
17	Greece	8	15	4	13	23	11		22	
18	Iceland	22	23	25	25	21	25		25	
19	Moldova	9	24	20	7	18	16		4	7
20	Sweden	19	5	7	6	3	5	6	7	4
21	Australia	1	3	13	18	20	6	5	23	
22	United Kingdom	3	4	21	4	8	3	8	12	
23	Poland	4	9	8	22	11	9	2	11	
24	Serbia	2	2	2	1	24	2	10	1	12
25	Estonia	7	8	22	23	12	14		8	3
