= Serbia in the Eurovision Song Contest 2022 =

- Eurovision Song Contest 2022
- Participating broadcaster: Radio Television of Serbia (RTS)
- Country: Serbia
- Selection process: Pesma za Evroviziju '22
- Selection date: 5 March 2022

Competing entry
- Song: "In corpore sano"
- Artist: Konstrakta
- Songwriters: Ana Đurić; Milovan Bošković

Placement
- Semi-final result: Qualified (3rd, 237 points)
- Final result: 5th, 312 points

Participation chronology

Serbia was represented at the Eurovision Song Contest 2022 with the song "In corpore sano" performed by Konstrakta. The Serbian national broadcaster Radio Television of Serbia (RTS) organised the national final Pesma za Evroviziju '22 in order to select the Serbian entry for the 2022 contest. It was the first entry in the Eurovision Song Contest to contain a verse in Latin.

== Background ==
Prior to the 2022 contest, Serbia has participated in the Eurovision Song Contest thirteen times since its first entry in 2007, winning the contest with their debut entry "Molitva" performed by Marija Šerifović. Since 2007, ten out of thirteen of Serbia's entries have featured in the final with the nation failing to qualify in 2009, 2013 and 2017. Serbia's 2021 entry, "Loco loco" performed by Hurricane, qualified to the final and placed fifteenth.

The Serbian national broadcaster, Radio Television of Serbia (RTS), broadcasts the event within Serbia and organises the selection process for the nation's entry. Between 2007 and 2009, Serbia used the Beovizija national final in order to select their entry. However, after their 2009 entry, "Cipela" performed by Marko Kon and Milaan, failed to qualify Serbia to the final, the broadcaster shifted their selection strategy to selecting specific composers to create songs for artists. In 2010, RTS selected Goran Bregović to compose songs for a national final featuring three artists, while in 2011 Kornelije Kovač, Aleksandra Kovač and Kristina Kovač were tasked with composing one song each. In 2012, the internal selection of Željko Joksimović and the song "Nije ljubav stvar" secured the country's second highest placing in the contest to this point, placing third. In 2013, RTS returned to an open national final format and organized the Beosong competition. The winning entry, "Ljubav je svuda" performed by Moje 3, failed to qualify Serbia to the final. In 2015, RTS selected Vladimir Graić, the composer of Serbia's 2007 winning entry "Molitva", to compose songs for a national final featuring three artists. RTS internally selected the Serbian entries in 2016 and 2017 with the decision made by RTS music editors. In 2018 and 2019, RTS returned to using the Beovizija national final in order to select their entry, managing to qualify every year to the final. After the cancellation of the 2020 contest, RTS selected Beovizija 2020 winners Hurricane to represent Serbia in 2021. Their song "Loco loco" was also internally selected and qualified the country to the final.

== Before Eurovision ==
=== Pesma za Evroviziju '22 ===
Pesma za Evroviziju '22 was the national final organised by the Radio Television of Serbia in order to select the Serbian entry for the Eurovision Song Contest 2022. The selection consisted of two semi-finals and a final, and saw 36 acts compete. All three shows took place at Studios 8 and 9 of RTS in Košutnjak, Belgrade.

==== Semi-finals ====
The first semi-final took place on 3 March 2022. "Zorja" performed by Zorja scored the most points in this semi-final, followed "In corpore sano" performed by Konstrakta, "Oskar" performed by Aca Lukas, "Dve godine i šes' dana" performed by Biber, "Drama" performed by Lift, "Ljubav me inspiriše" performed by Marija Mikić, "Origami" performed by Angellina, "Ljubav bez dodira" performed by Ana Stanić and "Znam" performed by Ivona. "Vrati mi" performed by Boris Subotić, "Pogledi" performed by Jelena Pajić, "To nisam ja" performed by Igor Simić, "Priđi mi" performed by Sanja Bogosavljević, "Pesma ljubavi" performed by VIS Limunada, "Dama" performed by Bojana Mašković, "Tu gde je ljubav ne postoji mrak" performed by Bane Lalić & MVP, "Brzina" performed by Julija and "Blanko" performed by Mia were eliminated from the contest.

The second semi-final was held on 4 March 2022. "Muškarčina" performed by Sara Jo scored the most points in this semi-final, followed by "Haos" performed by Gift, "Bejbi" performed by Zoe Kida, "Devojko sa plamenom u očima" performed by Chegi & Braća Bluz Band, "Počinjem da ludim" performed by Gramophonedzie, "Anđele moj" performed by Orkestar Aleksandra Sofronijevića, "Nema te" performed by Zejna Murkić, "Skidam" performed by Naiva and "Ljubi, ljubi doveka" performed by Tijana Dapčević. "Samo ne reci da voliš" performed by Dušan Svilar, "Istina i laži" performed by Julijana Vincan, "Tražim te" performed by Srđan Lazić, "Hajde sad nek' svak' peva" performed by Rocher Etno Band, "Požuri, požuri" performed by Marija Mirković, "Nedostaješ" performed by Euterpa, "Prijaće ti" performed by Ivana Vladović and Jovana Stanimirović, "Dođi da te volim" performed by Marko Nikolić and "Znaš li" performed by Vasco were eliminated from the contest.

==== Final ====
The final took place on 4 March 2022. The winner was selected based on the 50/50 combination of votes from five jurors and from a public televote.

Results of the final of Pesma za Evroviziju '22
R/O	Artist	Song	Jury		Televote		Total	Place
R/O	Artist	Song	Votes	Points	Votes	Points	Total	Place
1	Naiva	"Skidam"	14	0	3,204	0	0	15
2	Orkestar Aleksandra Sofronijevića	"Anđele moj"	2	0	2,829	0	0	15
3	Gift	"Haos"	11	0	3,208	1	1	13
4	Zejna Murkić	"Nema te"	15	1	846	0	1	14
5	Tijana Dapčević	"Ljubi, ljubi doveka"	17	4	1,228	0	4	11
6	Lift	"Drama"	1	0	6,947	6	6	7
7	Gramophonedzie	"Počinjem da ludim"	10	0	2,444	0	0	15
8	Zorja	"Zorja"	31	8	16,875	8	16	3
9	Aca Lukas	"Oskar"	6	0	11,018	7	7	5
10	Zoe Kida	"Bejbi"	20	5	4,030	2	7	6
11	Sara Jo	"Muškarčina"	46	10	21,253	10	20	2
12	Ana Stanić	"Ljubav bez dodira"	20	6	1,098	0	6	9
13	Biber	"Dve godine i šes' dana"	1	0	3,130	0	0	15
14	Angellina	"Origami"	20	7	5,273	3	10	4
15	Chegi & Braća Bluz Band	"Devojko sa plamenom u očima"	0	0	6,145	5	5	10
16	Ivona	"Znam"	15	3	2,169	0	3	12
17	Marija Mikić	"Ljubav me inspiriše"	15	2	5,683	4	6	8
18	Konstrakta	"In corpore sano"	46	12	44,459	12	24	1

=== Promotion ===
Konstrakta performed "In corpore sano" at the Israel Calling Eurovision pre-party in Tel Aviv on 7 April 2022, to positive feedback. Due to technical issues, she performed alone on stage and used hotel towels for the performance. Two days later, she performed the song on the third episode of the tenth season of Zvijezde pjevaju, the Croatian version of Just the Two of Us, on HRT 1.

=== Send-off ceremony ===
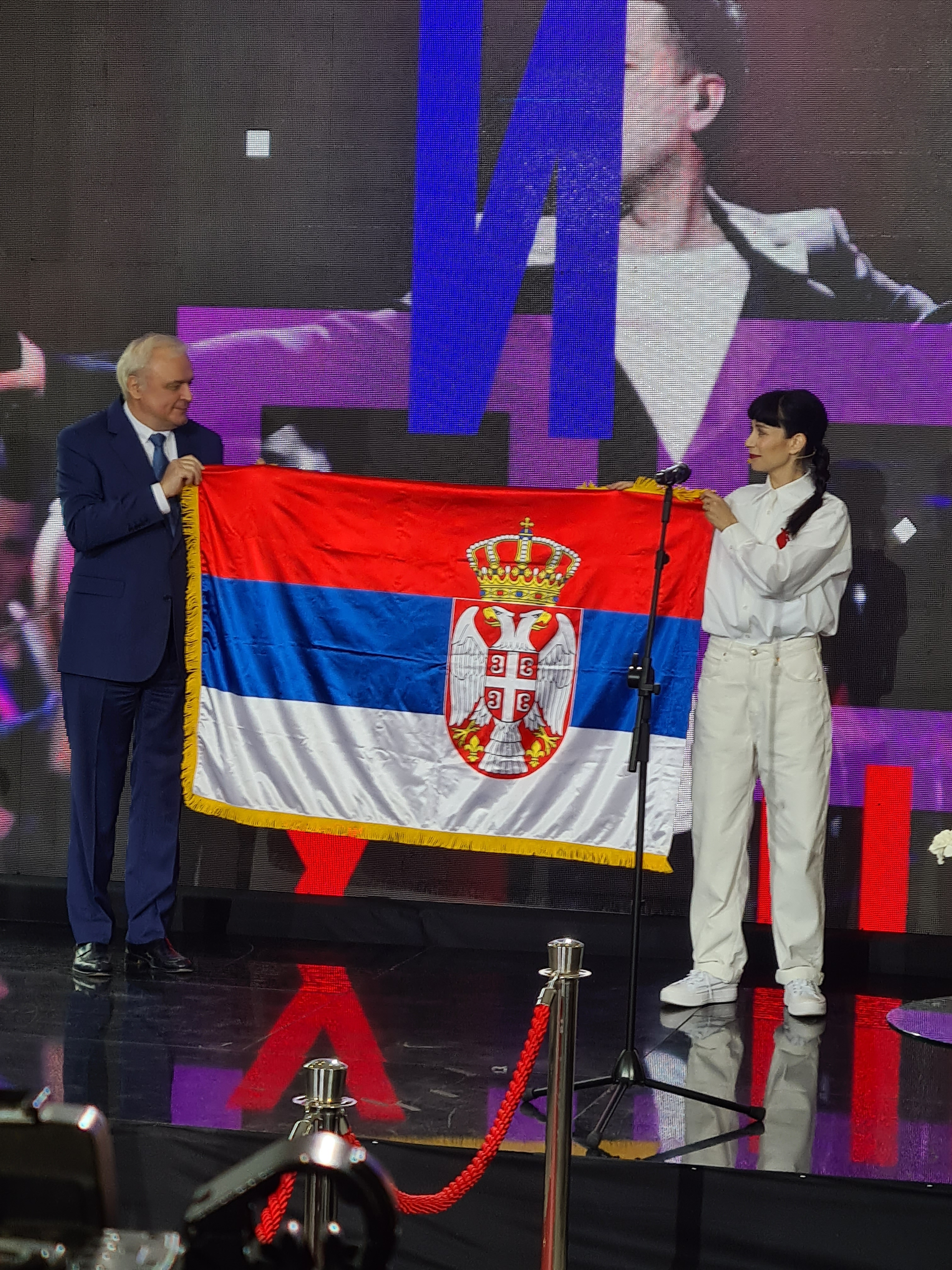
The Director of RTS, Dragan Bujošević, presented the flag of Serbia to Konstrakta, the representative of Serbia at the Eurovision Song Contest 2022

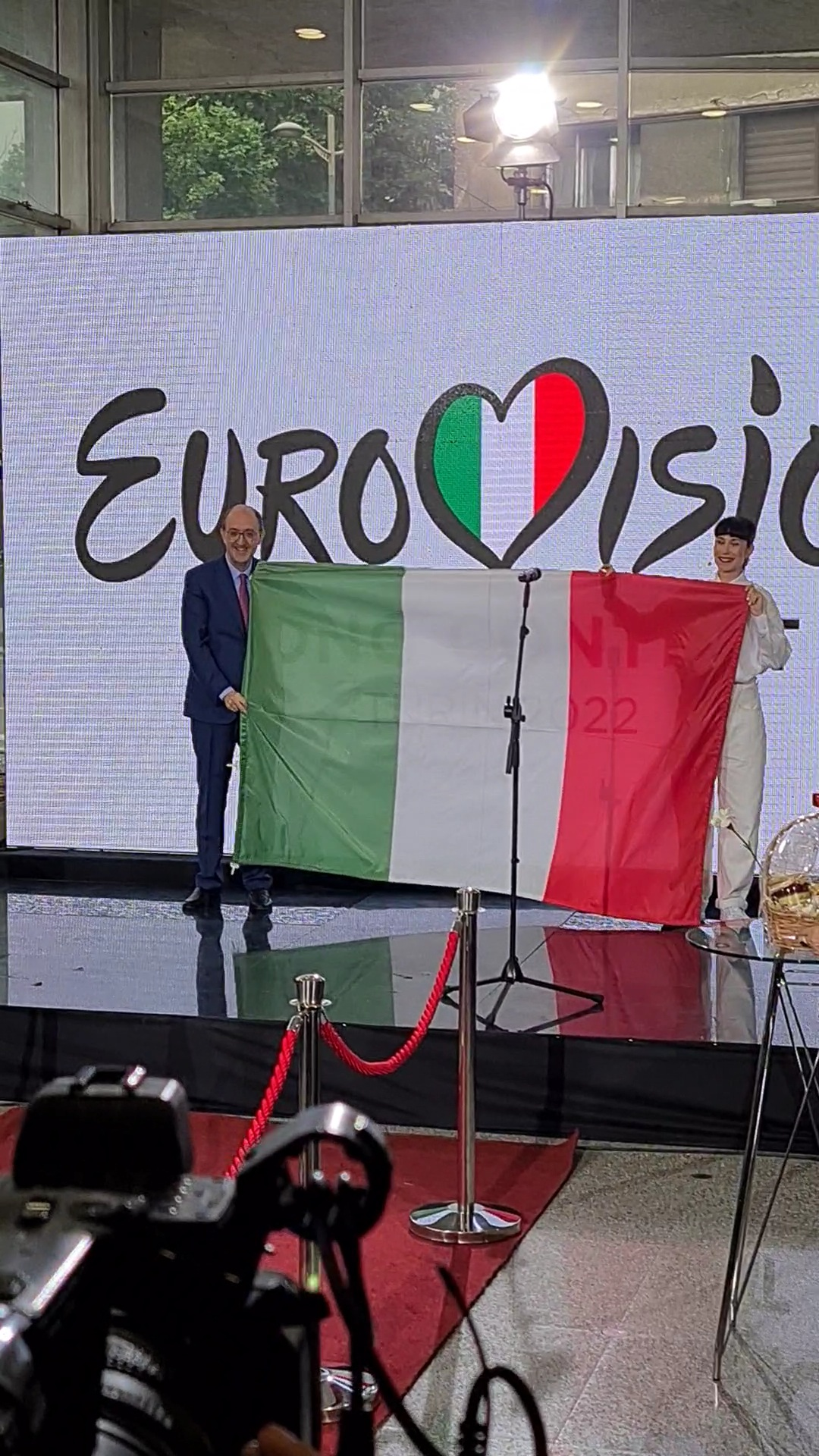
The Ambassador of Italy to Serbia, Carlo Lo Cascio, presenting the flag of the host country of the Eurovision Song Contest 2022 to Konstrakta

On April 28, RTS prepared a ceremonial farewell of the Serbian representative to the Eurovision Song Contest 2022. The ceremony was attended by numerous guests, including the Ambassador of Italy to Serbia Carlo Lo Cascio, the editor of the entertainment program Olivera Kovačević and the director of RTS Dragan Bujošević, as well as members of OGAE Serbia, fans of the competition, journalists and others. At the ceremony, the flags of Serbia and the host country were as is tradition given to the representative of Serbia. This year, the Ambassador of Italy to Serbia presented the Italian flag and wished the Serbian representative success in the competition.

== At Eurovision ==
According to Eurovision rules, all nations with the exceptions of the host country and the "Big Five" (France, Germany, Italy, Spain and the United Kingdom) are required to qualify from one of two semi-finals in order to compete for the final; the top ten countries from each semi-final progress to the final. The European Broadcasting Union (EBU) split up the competing countries into six different pots based on voting patterns from previous contests, with countries with favourable voting histories put into the same pot. On 25 January 2022, an allocation draw was held which placed each country into one of the two semi-finals, as well as which half of the show they would perform in. Serbia has been placed into the second semi-final, to be held on 12 May 2022, and has been scheduled to perform in the first half of the show.

Once all the competing songs for the 2022 contest had been released, the running order for the semi-finals was decided by the shows' producers rather than through another draw, so that similar songs were not placed next to each other. Serbia was set to perform in position 3, following the entry from Israel and before the entry from Azerbaijan.

=== Voting ===
Voting during the three shows involved each country awarding two sets of points from 1-8, 10 and 12: one from their professional jury and the other from televoting. Each nation's jury consisted of five music industry professionals who are citizens of the country they represent, with a diversity in gender and age represented. The judges assess each entry based on the performances during the second Dress Rehearsal of each show, which takes place the night before each live show, against a set of criteria including: vocal capacity; the stage performance; the song's composition and originality; and the overall impression by the act. Jury members may only take part in panel once every three years, and are obliged to confirm that they are not connected to any of the participating acts in a way that would impact their ability to vote impartially. Jury members should also vote independently, with no discussion of their vote permitted with other jury members. The exact composition of the professional jury, and the results of each country's jury and televoting were released after the grand final; the individual results from each jury member were also released in an anonymised form.

Below is a breakdown of points awarded to Serbia and awarded by Serbia in the second semi-final and grand final of the contest, and the breakdown of the jury voting and televoting conducted during the two shows:

==== Points awarded to Serbia ====
Points awarded to Serbia (Semi-final 2)
Score	Televote	Jury
12 points	Australia; Cyprus; Czech Republic; Georgia; Malta; Montenegro; North Macedonia; San Marino	North Macedonia
10 points	Germany; Romania; Sweden	
8 points	Finland; Israel	Finland
7 points	Poland	Ireland; Montenegro
6 points	Belgium; United Kingdom	
5 points	Spain	Cyprus; Spain; United Kingdom
4 points	Estonia; Ireland	Australia
3 points		Azerbaijan
2 points		Belgium; Georgia; San Marino
1 point		Israel

Points awarded to Serbia (Final)
Score	Televote	Jury
12 points	Croatia; Montenegro; North Macedonia; Slovenia; Switzerland	Croatia; Montenegro
10 points	Austria; Bulgaria; Czech Republic	North Macedonia
8 points	Australia; France; Greece; San Marino; Sweden	Australia
7 points	Cyprus; Finland; Georgia; Germany; Israel; Italy; Romania	Finland
6 points	Armenia; Azerbaijan; Malta	Slovenia; Spain
5 points	Poland; Portugal	Ireland
4 points		Belgium; Cyprus; Italy; Sweden
3 points	Albania; Netherlands; Norway	Portugal
2 points	Belgium; Latvia; Spain	
1 point	Iceland; Ireland; United Kingdom	Lithuania; United Kingdom

==== Points awarded by Serbia ====
Points awarded by Serbia (Semi-final 2)
Score	Televote	Jury
12 points	Montenegro	Sweden
10 points	Cyprus	Estonia
8 points	North Macedonia	Azerbaijan
7 points	Czech Republic	Montenegro
6 points	Romania	Belgium
5 points	Sweden	Finland
4 points	Estonia	Czech Republic
3 points	Belgium	Poland
2 points	Malta	Australia
1 point	Finland	North Macedonia

Points awarded by Serbia (Final)
Score	Televote	Jury
12 points	Moldova	Azerbaijan
10 points	Spain	Estonia
8 points	Norway	Belgium
7 points	Ukraine	Portugal
6 points	Estonia	Finland
5 points	Romania	Sweden
4 points	Italy	Spain
3 points	Lithuania	Czech Republic
2 points	France	Lithuania
1 point	Sweden	United Kingdom

==== Detailed voting results ====
The following members comprised the Serbian jury:

- Dušan Alagić
- Jelena Tomašević
- Mari Mari
- Miloš Luka Roganović
- Srđan Marjanović

Detailed voting results from Serbia (Semi-final 2)
R/O	Country	Jury							Televote	
R/O	Country	Juror A	Juror B	Juror C	Juror D	Juror E	Rank	Points	Rank	Points
01	Finland	1	8	4	7	11	6	5	10	1
02	Israel	14	11	12	15	16	15		15	
03	Serbia									
04	Azerbaijan	4	2	3	5	7	3	8	17	
05	Georgia	15	12	11	14	14	13		13	
06	Malta	16	15	16	16	12	16		9	2
07	San Marino	17	17	17	17	17	17		12	
08	Australia	12	5	6	10	9	9	2	11	
09	Cyprus	13	13	9	13	13	12		2	10
10	Ireland	10	16	15	12	15	14		14	
11	North Macedonia	11	7	10	11	5	10	1	3	8
12	Estonia	5	3	2	2	6	2	10	7	4
13	Romania	6	9	13	8	10	11		5	6
14	Poland	7	6	8	6	8	8	3	16	
15	Montenegro	2	14	14	3	1	4	7	1	12
16	Belgium	3	10	7	4	3	5	6	8	3
17	Sweden	8	1	1	1	2	1	12	6	5
18	Czech Republic	9	4	5	9	4	7	4	4	7

Detailed voting results from Serbia (Final)
R/O	Country	Jury							Televote	
R/O	Country	Juror A	Juror B	Juror C	Juror D	Juror E	Rank	Points	Rank	Points
01	Czech Republic	8	9	16	5	9	8	3	17	
02	Romania	7	23	17	9	14	13		6	5
03	Portugal	17	4	1	4	10	4	7	11	
04	Finland	1	13	9	6	4	5	6	12	
05	Switzerland	21	19	10	12	21	21		24	
06	France	22	20	12	24	24	24		9	2
07	Norway	24	10	19	15	20	22		3	8
08	Armenia	16	15	5	10	12	12		19	
09	Italy	10	11	11	21	18	19		7	4
10	Spain	9	3	22	19	3	7	4	2	10
11	Netherlands	15	6	6	17	17	11		13	
12	Ukraine	18	7	24	20	15	20		4	7
13	Germany	19	16	7	11	16	17		21	
14	Lithuania	5	17	8	8	19	9	2	8	3
15	Azerbaijan	4	8	2	1	2	1	12	22	
16	Belgium	2	21	3	2	6	3	8	14	
17	Greece	6	12	18	22	13	15		15	
18	Iceland	20	24	4	23	23	16		23	
19	Moldova	23	22	15	14	22	23		1	12
20	Sweden	13	1	23	18	1	6	5	10	1
21	Australia	14	18	14	7	11	14		20	
22	United Kingdom	12	5	21	13	7	10	1	16	
23	Poland	11	14	20	16	8	18		18	
24	Serbia									
25	Estonia	3	2	13	3	5	2	10	5	6

== Ratings ==
In Serbia, 1,169,473 people on average watched the final. The final recorded a share of 47.06%, and a rating of 17.97%.

The share for Konstrakta's semi-final in Serbia was around 31.1%, with a rating of around 12.4%, and an average viewership of 831,317. The other semi-final recorded a share of around 20.61%, with a rating of around 8.2%, with an average viewership of 544,659.
