= Andrea (Macedonian singer) =

Macedonian singer (born 2000)

Andrea Koevska Андреа Коевска
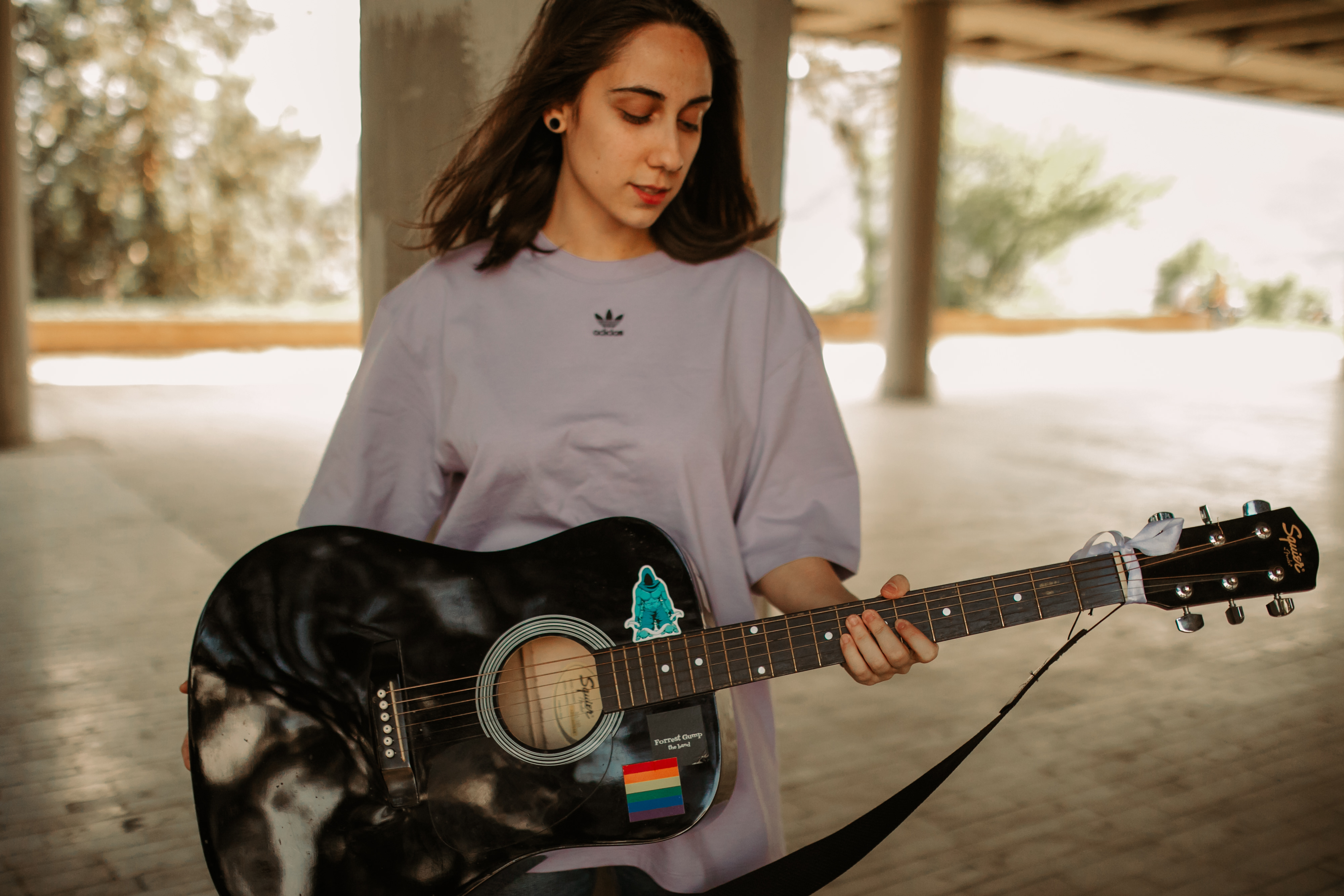
- Koevska in 2021

Background information
- Born: February 14, 2000 (age 26); Skopje, Macedonia
- Genre: Pop
- Occupation: Singer
- Years active: 2020–present

Andrea Koevska (Macedonian: Андреа Коевска; born 14 February 2000), best known under her mononym Andrea, is a Macedonian singer. She represented North Macedonia in the Eurovision Song Contest 2022 with "Circles".

== Early life ==
Andrea was born in Skopje, Macedonia (present-day North Macedonia), on 14 February 2000.

== Career ==
While posting short videos of herself singing famous pop and rock songs, producer Aleksandar Masevski noticed her and offered Andrea to collaborate with him.

=== 2022: Eurovision Song Contest ===
In 2022, Andrea was selected to represent North Macedonia after winning the national selection, Za Evrosong 2022. As there was a tie for first place, Andrea was declared the winner as she received maximum points from the international jury. During the "Turquoise Carpet" event which preceded the opening ceremony of the contest on 8 May 2022, Andrea was seen throwing the flag of North Macedonia onto the floor during a photoshoot with the press. The Macedonian broadcaster Macedonian Radio Television (MRT) later published a statement condemning her action, describing it as "desecration of a national symbol, which is punishable by Macedonian law". MRT threatened to withdraw Andrea from the contest. Andrea immediately issued a statement on national television, apologising for her actions and stating that she simply meant to hand the flag to a member of the delegation, who was too far away.

At Eurovision, Andrea performed on 12 May 2022, in the second semi-final. She failed to qualify to the grand final, finishing 11th out of 18 participants in the semi-final.

== Artistry ==
=== Influences ===
While living in New York, she was exposed to a variety of genres that inspire her music today, such as gospel, R&B, pop, and pop-punk. She has also cited Lauryn Hill and Hayley Williams as being some of her musical inspirations.

== Personal life ==
Andrea's mother is a physician and her father is a law professor. Her grandfather, who died when she was nine, is said to have been the primary source of Andrea's passion in music. When she is not recording music or performing, Andrea is practicing her love of the martial art Muay Thai or taking care of her dog Leo.

== Discography ==
=== Singles ===
- "I Know" (2020)
- "I Don't Know Your Name" (2020)
- "Talk To Me" (2021)
- "Circles" (2022)
- "Betting on You" (2022)
- "Choosing My Way" (2022)
- "Heartbreak" (2022)
- "Javachi" (2022)
- "Stvoreni za ljubov" (2022)
- "Close to the Sun" (2022)
- "Telepatija" (2022)

Awards and achievements
Preceded by Vasil Garvanliev with "Here I Stand"	North Macedonia in the Eurovision Song Contest; 2022	Succeeded by TBA
