= Llámame (Wrs song) =

2022 song by Wrs

Single by Wrs

from the EP Mandala
- Language: English, Spanish
- Released: 10 February 2022
- Length: 3:04
- Label: Global
- Songwriters: Andrei Ursu; Cezar Gună; Alexandru Turcu; Costel Dominteanu

Music video
- "Llámame" on YouTube

Eurovision Song Contest 2022 entry
- Country: Romania
- Artist: Wrs
- Composers: Andrei Ursu; Cezar Gună; Alexandru Turcu; Costel Dominteanu
- Lyricists: Andrei Ursu; Cezar Gună

Finals performance
- Semi-final result: 9th
- Semi-final points: 118
- Final result: 18th
- Final points: 65

Entry chronology
- ◄ "Amnesia" (2021)
- "D.G.T. (Off and On)" (2023) ►

Official performance video
- "Llámame" (Second Semi-Final) on YouTube "Llámame" (Grand Final) on YouTube

"Llámame" (Spanish: [ˈʎamame]; transl. "Call me") is a 2022 song by Romanian singer Wrs. The song represented Romania in the Eurovision Song Contest 2022 in Turin, Italy after winning Selecția Națională 2022, Romania's national final.

== Background ==
"Llámame" was written by Alexandru Turcu, Andrei Ursu (Wrs), Cezar Gună and Costel Domințeanu, while the production was solely handled by the latter. It was released for digital download and streaming in various countries on 10 February 2022 by Global Records, having a length of three minutes and four seconds. Wrs' extended play Mandala, issued on 31 March 2022 by the same label, included a remastered version of the song for the singer's participation at the Eurovision Song Contest 2022.

== Eurovision Song Contest ==
=== Selecția Națională 2022 ===
Televiziunea Română (TVR) opened a submission period for artists and composers to submit their entries between 26 November 2021 and 19 December 2021. The broadcaster received 94 submissions within the submission deadline. A jury panel consisting of Alexandra Ungureanu (singer), Ozana Barabancea (opera singer, actress), Randi (singer, producer), Cristian Faur (composer, producer) and Adrian Romcescu (composer, conductor) reviewed the received submissions on 21 and 22 December 2021, with each juror on the committee rating each song between 1 (lowest) and 10 (highest) based on criteria such as the melodic harmony and structure of the song, the orchestral arrangement, originality and stylistic diversity of the composition and sound and voice quality. After the combination of the jury votes, the top 45 entries that scored the highest, one per artist that entered with more than one song, were selected for the national final. The competing entries were announced on 23 December 2021.

Forty-six songs competed in the first semi-final and twenty qualified to the second semi-final. A jury panel first selected fifteen songs to advance, and a public online vote which took place on the Eurovision Romania Facebook page on 9 and 10 February 2022 then selected an additional five qualifiers from the remaining thirty entries. "Llámame" qualified with the jury, while also only receiving 842 votes with the public, in 21st.

The second semi-final took place on 12 February 2022 at the TVR studios in Bucharest, hosted by Anca Mazilu and Bogdan Stănescu with Ilinca hosting segments from the green room. Twenty songs competed, with the jury panel selecting ten of them to qualify to the final. "Llámame" was selected as one of the ten finalists.

The final would take place on 5 March 2022. "Llámame" was determined the winner by the combination of the votes from the jury panel and public televoting. Each member of the jury voted by assigning scores from 1–8, 10 and 12 points to their preferred songs, with the juries awarding 290 points in total. The viewer vote was assigned by dividing the votes received by each song by the number of votes of the song that gained the most viewer votes. This number was then multiplied by 12 and rounded to two decimal places. For example, if song A received the most viewer votes and song B received 10% of song A's votes, then song A would be awarded 12 televoting points and song B would be awarded 1.2 televoting points.

=== In Turin ===
The Eurovision Song Contest 2022 took place at PalaOlimpico in Turin, Italy and consisted of two semi-finals on 10 and 12 May, respectively, and the final on 14 May 2022. According to Eurovision rules, each country, except the host country and the "Big Five" (France, Germany, Italy, Spain and the United Kingdom), was required to qualify from one of two semi-finals to compete for the final; the top ten countries from each semi-final progressed to the final. In March 2022, it was announced that "Llámame" would be performed 13th in the second semi-final of the contest, following Estonia and preceding Poland. Upon qualifying to the final round, Wrs sang second, after the Czech Republic and before Portugal.

==== Points awarded to Romania ====
Below is a breakdown of points awarded to Romania in the second semi-final and Grand Final of the contest, and the breakdown of the jury voting and televoting conducted during the two shows. The country qualified for the Grand Final in ninth place with 118 points, ranked 14th by the jury's 18 points, and fifth by the televote of 100 points. This marked their first qualification since 2017. In the final, Romania reached 18th place in a field of 25 with 65 points, placed 21st by the jury's 12 points and 13th by the televote of 53 points.

Points awarded to Romania (Semi-final 2)
Score	Televote	Jury
12 points	Spain	
10 points	Cyprus	
8 points	Belgium; San Marino	Germany
7 points	United Kingdom	
6 points	Azerbaijan; Serbia	
5 points	Georgia; Germany; Ireland; Malta; Poland	
4 points	Australia; Czech Republic	Israel; Spain
3 points	Finland; Sweden	
2 points	Estonia; Israel	Estonia
1 point		

Points awarded to Romania (Final)
Score	Televote	Jury
12 points		
10 points	Moldova; Spain	
8 points	Italy	
7 points		Greece
6 points		
5 points	Serbia	
4 points	Bulgaria; Cyprus	Spain
3 points	Malta; United Kingdom	
2 points	Greece; Ireland	
1 point	France; San Marino	Germany

== Charts ==
=== Weekly charts ===
2022–2023 weekly chart performance for "Llámame"
Chart (2022–2023)	Peak position
CIS Airplay (TopHit)	98
Germany Download (Official German Charts)	52
Greece International (IFPI)	73
Iceland (Tónlistinn)	33
Lithuania (AGATA)	15
Moldova Airplay (TopHit)	46
Netherlands (Single Tip)	23
Romania (Billboard)	3
Romania Airplay (UPFR)	1
Romania Airplay (Media Forest)	1
Spain (Promusicae)	91
Sweden Heatseeker (Sverigetopplistan)	10
UK Singles Downloads (Official Charts)	59

2024 weekly chart performance for "Llámame"
Chart (2024)	Peak position
Moldova Airplay (TopHit)	59

2025 weekly chart performance for "Llámame"
Chart (2025)	Peak position
Moldova Airplay (TopHit)	49

=== Monthly charts ===
Monthly chart performance for "Llámame"
Chart (2025)	Peak position
Moldova Airplay (TopHit)	59

=== Year-end charts ===
Year-end chart performance
Chart (2025)	Position
Moldova Airplay (TopHit)	185

== Release history ==
Release history for "Llámame"
Country	Date	Format(s)	Label	Ref.
Various	10 February 2022	Digital download; streaming	Global	

== See also ==
- List of music released by Romanian artists that has charted in major music markets
