= Andrei Ursu =

Romanian singer

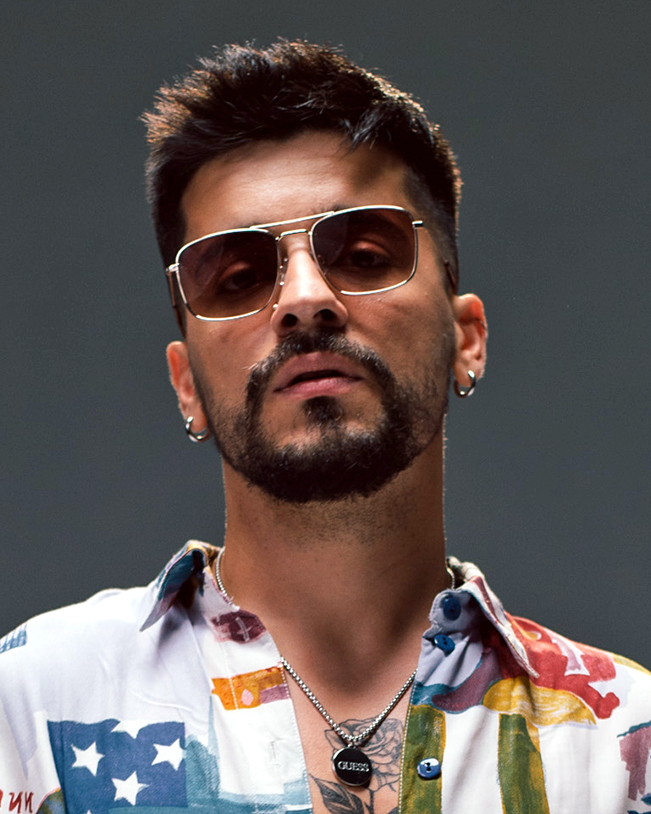
- Ursu in 2014
- Born: Andrei-Ionuț Ursu; 16 January 1993 (age 33); Buzău, Romania
- Other name: Wrs
- Occupations: Dancer; singer; songwriter
- Years active: 2015–present
- Musical career
- Genres: Electropop • dance-pop • Latin pop
- Instrument: Vocals
- Label: Global
- Formerly of: Shot

Andrei-Ionuț Ursu (Romanian pronunciation: [anˈdrej joˈnuts ˈursu]; born 16 January 1993), previously known as Wrs (IPA: [urs]; stylized in all lowercase), is a Romanian singer-songwriter and dancer. He represented Romania at the Eurovision Song Contest 2022 with the song "Llámame", placing 18th in the final.

== Life and career ==
Andrei-Ionuț Ursu was born in Buzău on 16 January 1993. He started dancing at the age of 12, encouraged by his parents who were folk music dancers. Ursu worked as a dancer for artists such as Inna, Antonia or Carla's Dreams and was part of the Pro TV ballet crew on shows such as Vocea României and Românii au talent.

In 2015, he started his musical career in the boyband Shot. After two years, he left the project, moved to London and began composing music.

In January 2020, Ursu signed with Global Records and started his electro-pop solo project under the stage name Wrs. That same month, he released his debut single "Why". In February 2022, he released the single "Llámame", with which he was selected to represent Romania at the Eurovision Song Contest 2022.

On 12 May 2023, Ursu released his first studio album, titled FIESTA '23. On 10 October 2023, he announced his intention to drop his stage name.

== Personal life ==
In a May 2023 interview with El País, Ursu revealed that he does not label his sexuality. He is in a relationship with a man named Vlad Condurache.

== Discography ==
=== Studio albums ===
Title	Details
Fiesta '23	Released: 12 May 2023; Labels: Global Records; Formats: Digital download, streaming

=== Extended plays ===
List of extended plays
Title	Details
Mandala	Released: 31 March 2022; Label: Global Records; Format: Digital download, streaming
Cântece de Inimă	Released: 26 January 2024; Label: Global Records; Format: Digital download, streaming
Cântece de Inimă – Vol 2	Released: 15 February 2025; Label: Global Records; Format: Digital download, streaming
Canciones del corazón	Released: 13 June 2025; Label: Global Records; Format: Digital download, streaming

=== Singles ===
==== Charted single as lead artist ====
List of charted singles as lead artist
Title	Year	Peak chart positions								Album
Title	Year	ROM Air. (Note: Due to lack of constantly updated Romanian charts, Romania Songs, Billboard's streaming and digital download-based chart inaugurated in February 2022, is taken into consideration (interchangeably with the UPFR charts) for Romanian peaks after the Airplay 100's cancellation in November 2021. Since only 10 positions of the UPFR chart are public, peaks within the Top 100 of TopHit's Romanian Airplay are also being taken into consideration.)	BUL Air.	GER Dig.	LTU	NLD Tip.	SPA	SWE Heat.	UK Down.	Album
"Amore" (with İlkan Günüç)	2021	25	—	—	—	—	—	—	—	Non-album singles
"Tsunami"	2021	81	6	—	—	—	—	—	—	Non-album singles
"Llámame"	2022	1	—	52	15	23	91	10	59	Mandala
"De-ai fi în locul meu" (with Andra)	2025	7	—	—	—	—	—	—	—	Non-album singles
"A cui e vina"	2025	88	—	—	—	—	—	—	—	Non-album singles
"—" denotes a title that did not chart, or was not released in that territory.

== See also ==
- List of music released by Romanian artists that has charted in major music markets

Preceded by Roxen with "Amnesia"	Romania in the Eurovision Song Contest; 2022	Succeeded by Theodor Andrei with "D.G.T. (Off and On)"
