= Romania in the Eurovision Song Contest 2022 =

- Eurovision Song Contest 2022
- Participating broadcaster: Televiziunea Română (TVR)
- Country: Romania
- Selection process: Selecția Națională 2022
- Selection date: 5 March 2022

Competing entry
- Song: "Llámame"
- Artist: Wrs
- Songwriters: Andrei Ursu; Cezar Gună; Alexandru Turcu; Costel Dominteanu

Placement
- Semi-final result: Qualified (9th, 118 points)
- Final result: 18th, 65 points

Participation chronology

Romania was represented at the Eurovision Song Contest 2022 with the song "Llámame", written by Andrei Ursu, Cezar Gună, Alexandru Turcu, and Costel Dominteanu, and performed by Ursu himself under his stage name Wrs. The Romanian participating broadcaster, Televiziunea Română (TVR), organised the national final Selecția Națională 2022 in order to select its entry for the contest. The national final consisted of three shows, including two semi-finals and a final. A total of 46 entries were selected and 10 qualifiers ultimately competed in the final on 5 March 2022, where the winner scoring top marks from both a jury panel and a public televote was selected.

Romania was drawn to compete in the second semi-final of the Eurovision Song Contest which took place on 12 May 2022. Performing during the show in position 13, "Llámame" was announced among the top 10 entries of the second semi-final and hence qualified to compete in the final. In the final, Romania placed 18th with 65 points. It was later revealed that the country placed 9th in the semi-final with 118 points.

== Background ==
Prior to the 2022 contest, Televiziunea Română (TVR) had participated in the Eurovision Song Contest representing Romania 21 times since its first entry in 1994. To this point, its highest placing in the contest has been third place, achieved on two occasions: in 2005 with the song "Let Me Try" performed by Luminița Anghel and Sistem, and in 2010 with the song "Playing with Fire" performed by Paula Seling and Ovi.

As part of its duties as participating broadcaster, TVR organises the selection of its entry in the Eurovision Song Contest and broadcasts the event in the country. In 2020, the broadcaster did not fully select its representative by means of the national final format Selecția Națională for the first time ever. They collaborated instead with Global Records to internally select the entrant, Roxen, with the entry "Alcohol You" being selected through a national final. However, the contest was ultimately cancelled due to the COVID-19 pandemic. Roxen was internally re-selected to take part in the 2021 contest with the song "Amnesia", which failed to qualify to the final, placing 12th in the first semi-final. This marked the third consecutive time that the nation failed to qualify to the final of the Eurovision Song Contest since the introduction of semi-finals in 2004. Following the televised debate Eurovision... pe șleau! ("Eurovision... frankly!") on 5 July 2021 which featured personalities of the national music industry, the broadcaster confirmed its intentions to participate at the 2022 contest on 20 October 2021 and would opt for a national final with several artists to select its 2022 entry.

== Before Eurovision ==
=== Selecția Națională 2022 ===
Selecția Națională 2022 was the national final organised by TVR in order to select its entry for the Eurovision Song Contest 2022. The competition consisted of two shows: a semi-final featuring forty-five songs and a final featuring ten songs to be held between 9 February and 5 March 2022. Both shows took place at the TVR studios in Bucharest and were televised on TVR1, TVR HD, TVRi, as well as online via the broadcaster's streaming service TVR+ and YouTube. The two shows were also aired in Moldova via the channel TVR Moldova. An additional three shows, titled Drumul spre Torino (Road to Turin) and hosted by Ilinca who represented Romania in 2017, were aired on TVR1 between 5 and 7 February 2022 in order to give insight on the competing acts.

==== Competing entries ====
TVR opened a submission period for artists and composers to submit their entries between 26 November 2021 and 19 December 2021. The broadcaster received 94 submissions within the submission deadline. A jury panel consisting of Alexandra Ungureanu (singer), Ozana Barabancea (opera singer, actress), Randi (singer, producer), Cristian Faur (composer, producer) and Adrian Romcescu (composer, conductor) reviewed the received submissions on 21 and 22 December 2021, with each juror on the committee rating each song between 1 (lowest) and 10 (highest) based on criteria such as the melodic harmony and structure of the song, the orchestral arrangement, originality and stylistic diversity of the composition and sound and voice quality. After the combination of the jury votes, the top 45 entries that scored the highest, one per artist that entered with more than one song, were selected for the national final. The competing entries were announced on 23 December 2021. Among the selected competing artists are Ciro de Luca, who represented Romania in 2007 as part of Todomondo, and Cezar Ouatu, who previously represented Romania in 2013. Live performances of the competing entries were filmed at the TVR Studio 3 in Bucharest between 19 and 21 January 2022 and released online via YouTube on 5 February 2022.

On 28 December 2021, TVR announced that "Malere" performed by E-an-na would also participate in the competition following a successful appeal made by the performers. "Best of Me" performed by Alex Parker, Erik Frank and Bastien was withdrawn from the competition on the same day and replaced with Parker and Bastien's second song "All This Love". "Hypnotized" performed by Barbara Tešija, was withdrawn from the competition on 5 February 2022. On 9 February, "That Way" performed by Fabi was withdrawn from the semi-final due to Fabi testing positive for COVID-19.

==== Shows ====
===== Semi-final =====
The semi-final took place over two rounds between 9 and 12 February 2022. In the first round, forty-five songs competed and twenty qualified to the second round. A jury panel first selected fifteen songs to advance. The remaining thirty entries then faced a public online vote which took place on the Eurovision Romania Facebook page on 9 and 10 February 2022 which determined an additional five qualifiers. The twenty qualifying entries were announced on 10 February 2022 during the TVR evening news broadcast. In the second round which took place on 12 February 2022 and hosted by Anca Mazilu and Bogdan Stănescu with Ilinca hosting segments from the green room, a jury panel selected ten songs to qualify to the final. The members of the jury panel that voted during the semi-final were: Alexandra Ungureanu (singer), Ozana Barabancea (opera singer, actress), Randi (singer, producer), Cristian Faur (composer, producer) and Adrian Romcescu (composer, conductor).

Jury qualifier Online vote qualifier

First round – 9–10 February 2022
Artist	Song	Songwriter(s)	Votes	Place	Result
Aldo Blaga	"Embers"	Ylva Persson; Linda Persson; Rickard Bonde Truumeel; Charlie Mason; John Matthews	1,423	11	Advanced
Alex Parker and Bastien	"All This Love"	Alexandru Ciacoi; Vlad Cireşan; Sebastian Tudor	453	31	Advanced
Alexa	"Hoodies and Cold Nights"	Radu Bolfea; Inaki Calvo Medel; Omar Secada Dihigo; Alexa Niculae	863	20	—N/a
Alina Amon	"Without You"	Alina Amon	985	16	—N/a
Ana	"Youngster"	Ana Maria Lazăr	380	35	—N/a
Andra Oproiu	"Younique"	Ylva Persson; Linda Persson; Paul Dubrovsky; Lee Music	1,860	7	Advanced
Andrea Stocchino	"Avere paura"	Andrea Stocchino; Nicolo Baldini; Emedio Mazzilli	502	28	—N/a
Andrei Petruș	"Take Me"	Călin Ionce; Silvia Ștefănescu	1,650	8	Advanced
Aris	"Do svidaniya" (До свидания)	Michael James Down; Will Taylor; Primož Poglajen; Natalie Palmer	1,110	13	Advanced
Ayona	"Let Me Come to You"	Marius Cobianu	254	38	—N/a
Bogdan Dumitraș	"Sign"	Alex Luft	444	32	—N/a
Carmen Trandafir	"Măști"	Carmen Trandafir; Riona Sakurada	588	24	—N/a
Cezar Ouatu	"For Everyone"	Mihai Alexandru; Christian Alexandru	598	23	Advanced
Ciro de Luca	"Imperdonabile"	Ciro de Luca; Rareș Varniote	147	42	—N/a
Cream, Minodora and Diana Bucșa	"România mea"	Alina Manolache; Costi Ioniță	1,497	9	Advanced
Dan Helciug	"241"	Dan Helciug	1,271	12	—N/a
Dora Gaitanovici	"Ana"	Dora Gaitanovici	3,218	2	Advanced
E-an-na	"Malere"	Andrei Oltean; Ovidiu Ban	10,124	1	Advanced
Eliza G	"The Other Half of Me"	Valerio Carboni; Giuseppe Anastasi; Mike Connaris; Elisa Gaiotto	566	25	Advanced
Eugenia Nicolae feat. Cazanoi Brothers	"Doina"	Eugenia Niţu; Cezar Cazanoi; Anatolie Cazanoi; Liviu Tănăsoiu	1,042	15	Advanced
~~Fabi~~ (Note: Although Fabi had withdrawn before the voting started, he was still included on the Eurovision Romania Facebook page.)	~~"That Way"~~	~~Fabian Ferrara~~	~~4~~	~~45~~	Withdrew
Forțele de muncă	"Hai afară, frate!"	Florin Dumitrescu	420	33	—N/a
Gabriel Basco	"One Night"	Gabriel Bîscoveanu; Roland Kiss; Dominic Dehen Perfetti	2,140	6	Advanced
Giulia-Georgia	"Find Your Way"	Giulia-Georgia Beiliciu	457	30	—N/a
Ivel	"Neverending"	Ivelin Trakiyski	25	44	—N/a
Jessie	"Regret"	Jessie Baneş; Bogdan Samoilenco; Loredana Cavasdan; Bianca Dragomir-Fotache; David Popa; Călin Luca; Tomer Weissbuch; Olga Verbitchi	251	39	—N/a
Kyrie Mendél	"Hurricane"	Kyrie Mendél	148	41	Advanced
Letiția Moisescu	"Mirunica"	Ovidiu Junghiatu; Niculae Robert Andrei	500	29	—N/a
Leyah	"I'll Be Fine"	Magdalena Marica	534	27	—N/a
Mălina	"Prisoner"	Cornel-Valentin Oprea; Malina-Elena Paraschiv	2,336	5	Advanced
Miryam	"Top of the Rainbow"	Ovidiu Anton	902	18	—N/a
Møise	"Guilty"	Shawn Myers; Jonas Gladnikoff	537	26	Advanced
Oana Tăbultoc	"Utopia"	Ylva Persson; Linda Persson; Rickard Bonde Truumeel; Roeland Ruijsch	2,629	4	Advanced
Olivia Miheț	"Fragile"	Olivia Miheț; Mihai Costăchescu	274	37	—N/a
Othello	"You're Worthy"	Liviu Elekes; Roxana Elekes	329	36	—N/a
Outflow	"Running in Circles"	Florin Ciotlăuș; Lucian Călin Blaga; George Popa; Mircea Georoceanu	1,430	10	—N/a
Petra	"Ireligios"	Petronela Donciu	251	39	Advanced
Roberta-Maria Popa	"Indigo"	Ylva Persson; Linda Persson; Peter Frodin; Lee Music	896	19	—N/a
Romeo Zaharia	"Until the Fight Is Over"	Arnar Ástráðsson; Aidan O'Connor	915	17	—N/a
Seeya	"Save Me"	Idris Jafarov; Bogdan Ioan Tomosoiu	71	43	—N/a
Sophia	"Beautiful Lies"	Alexandru Bugan; Eduard Cârcotă; Sophia Ulianov	410	34	—N/a
Stelian	"Remember"	Călin Giurgiu; Stelian Ciuciuc; Niklas Bergqvist; Stefan Knutsson	839	22	—N/a
Vanu	"Never Give Up"	Cristian Prăjescu; Ioana Hrisca; Teodora Constantin; Răzvan Alexa	1,084	14	Advanced
Vizi	"Sparrow"	Vizi Imre	2,753	3	Advanced
Wrs	"Llámame"	Andrei Ursu; Cezar Gună; Alexandru Turcu	842	21	Advanced

Second round – 12 February 2022
R/O	Artist	Song	Result
1	Alex Parker and Bastien	"All This Love"	Qualifed
2	Aldo Blaga	"Embers"	—N/a
3	Petra	"Ireligios"	Qualifed
4	Vizi	"Sparrow"	—N/a
5	Vanu	"Never Give Up"	Qualifed
6	Mălina	"Prisoner"	—N/a
7	Wrs	"Llámame"	Qualifed
8	Andrei Petruș	"Take Me"	Qualifed
9	Møise	"Guilty"	Qualifed
10	Gabriel Basco	"One Night"	Qualifed
11	Cream, Minodora and Diana Bucșa	"România mea"	Qualifed
12	Oana Tăbultoc	"Utopia"	—N/a
13	Kyrie Mendél	"Hurricane"	Qualifed
14	Dora Gaitanovici	"Ana"	Qualifed
15	Cezar Ouatu	"For Everyone"	—N/a
16	Andra Oproiu	"Younique"	—N/a
17	E-an-na	"Malere"	—N/a
18	Eugenia Nicolae feat. Cazanoi Brothers	"Doina"	—N/a
19	Eliza G	"The Other Half of Me"	—N/a
20	Aris	"Do svidaniya"	—N/a

===== Final =====
The final took place on 5 March 2022, hosted by Eda Marcus and Aurelian Temișan with Ilinca hosting segments from the green room. Ten songs competed and the winner, "Llámame" performed by Wrs, was determined by the combination of the votes from a five-member jury panel (5/6) and public televoting (1/6). Each juror voted by assigning scores from 1–8, 10 and 12 points to their preferred songs, with the juries awarding 290 points in total. The viewer vote was assigned by dividing the votes received by each song by the number of votes of the song that gained the most viewer votes. This number was then multiplied by 12 and rounded to two decimal places. For example, if song A received the most viewer votes and song B received 10% of song A's votes, then song A would be awarded 12 televoting points and song B would be awarded 1.2 televoting points. The members of the jury panel that voted during the final were: Alexandra Ungureanu (singer), Ozana Barabancea (opera singer, actress), Randi (singer, producer), Cristian Faur (composer, producer) and Adrian Romcescu (composer, conductor).

In addition to the performances of the competing entries, the interval acts featured performances by Jamala, who won Eurovision for Ukraine in 2016, performing her winning song "1944", as well as seven 2022 Eurovision entrants: Intelligent Music Project (Bulgaria), Zdob și Zdub and Frații Advahov (Moldova), Vladana (Montenegro), Andrea (North Macedonia), Ronela Hajati (Albania), We Are Domi (Czech Republic), and Stefan (Estonia).

Final – 5 March 2022
R/O	Artist	Song	Jury	Televote		Total	Place
R/O	Artist	Song	Jury	Votes	Points	Total	Place
1	Andrei Petruș	"Take Me"	11	807	2.59	13.59	9
2	Alex Parker and Bastien	"All This Love"	27	429	1.38	28.38	7
3	Gabriel Basco	"One Night"	35	1,048	3.37	38.37	4
4	Vanu	"Never Give Up"	34	676	2.17	36.17	5
5	Petra	"Ireligios"	34	412	1.32	35.32	6
6	Møise	"Guilty"	10	585	1.88	11.88	10
7	Cream, Minodora and Diana Bucșa	"România mea"	13	764	2.45	15.45	8
8	Kyrie Mendél	"Hurricane"	46	641	2.06	48.06	2
9	Dora Gaitanovici	"Ana"	32	3,737	12	44	3
10	Wrs	"Llámame"	48	3,497	11.23	59.23	1

Detailed jury votes
R/O	Song	A. Ungureanu	O. Barabancea	Randi	C. Faur	A. Romcescu	Total
1	"Take Me"	1	1	1	3	5	11
2	"All This Love"	5	4	5	6	7	27
3	"One Night"	7	3	6	7	12	35
4	"Never Give Up"	4	6	4	10	10	34
5	"Ireligios"	6	12	8	5	3	34
6	"Guilty"	3	2	3	1	1	10
7	"România mea"	2	5	2	2	2	13
8	"Hurricane"	10	10	10	8	8	46
9	"Ana"	8	7	7	4	6	32
10	"Llámame"	12	8	12	12	4	48

==== Ratings ====
Viewing figures by show
Show	Date	Viewing figures		Ref.
Show	Date	Nominal	Share	Ref.
Final	5 March 2022	197,000	2.6%	

=== Promotion ===
Wrs made several appearances across Europe to specifically promote "Llámame" as the Romanian Eurovision entry. On 26 March, Wrs performed during the Barcelona Eurovision Party, which was held at the Sala Apolo venue in Barcelona, Spain and hosted by Sharonne and Giuseppe Di Bella. On 3 April, Wrs performed during the London Eurovision Party, which was held at the Hard Rock Hotel in London, United Kingdom and hosted by Paddy O'Connell and SuRie. On 7 April, Wrs performed during the Israel Calling event held at the Menora Mivtachim Arena in Tel Aviv, Israel. On 9 April, Wrs performed during the Eurovision in Concert event which was held at the AFAS Live venue in Amsterdam, Netherlands and hosted by Cornald Maas and Edsilia Rombley. On 16 April, Wrs performed during the PrePartyES 2022 event which was held at the Sala La Riviera venue in Madrid, Spain and hosted by Ruth Lorenzo.

== At Eurovision ==
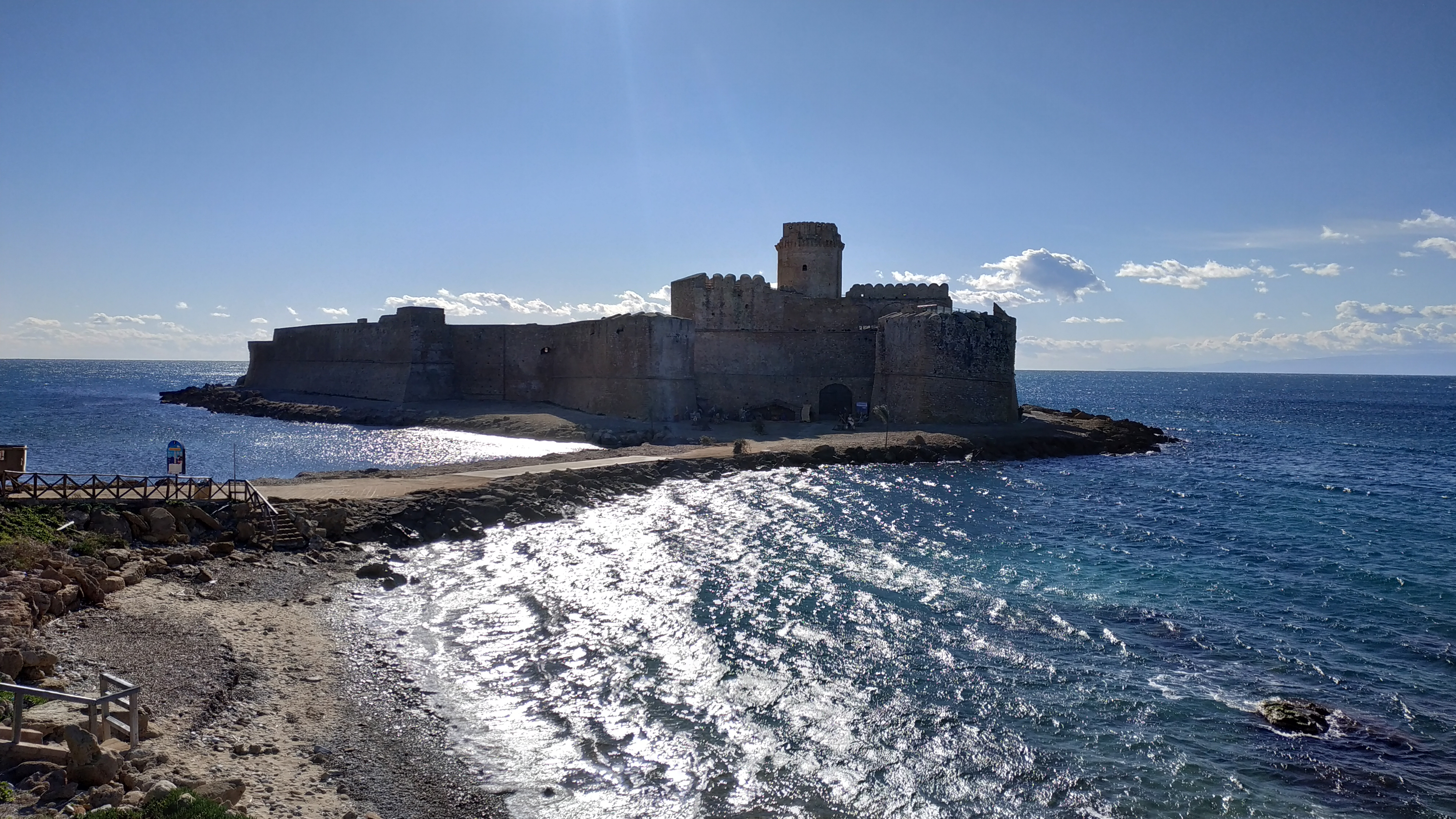
A video postcard introduced Wrs' performance in the second semi-final of the Eurovision Song Contest 2022. The postcard was filmed at the Isola di Capo Rizzuto in Crotone, Calabria and featured virtual projections of Wrs across the location.

According to Eurovision rules, all nations with the exceptions of the host country and the "Big Five" (France, Germany, Italy, Spain, and the United Kingdom) are required to qualify from one of two semi-finals in order to compete for the final; the top ten countries from each semi-final progress to the final. The European Broadcasting Union (EBU) split up the competing countries into six different pots based on voting patterns from previous contests, with countries with favourable voting histories put into the same pot. On 25 January 2022, an allocation draw was held which placed each country into one of the two semi-finals, as well as which half of the show they would perform in. Romania has been placed into the second semi-final, to be held on 12 May 2022, and has been scheduled to perform in the second half of the show.

Once all the competing songs for the 2022 contest had been released, the running order for the semi-finals was decided by the shows' producers rather than through another draw, so that similar songs were not placed next to each other. Romania was set to perform in position 13, following the entry from Estonia and before the entry from Poland.

All three shows were broadcast in Romania on TVR1 and TVRi with commentary by Bogdan Stănescu, who was joined by Kyrie Mendél for the final. TVR appointed Eda Marcus as its spokesperson to announce the top 12-point score awarded by the Romanian jury during the final, however during the broadcast of the final, Romania's jury votes were read by the EBU's Executive Supervisor Martin Österdahl. This was attributed to connection difficulties during the voting.

=== Semi-final ===
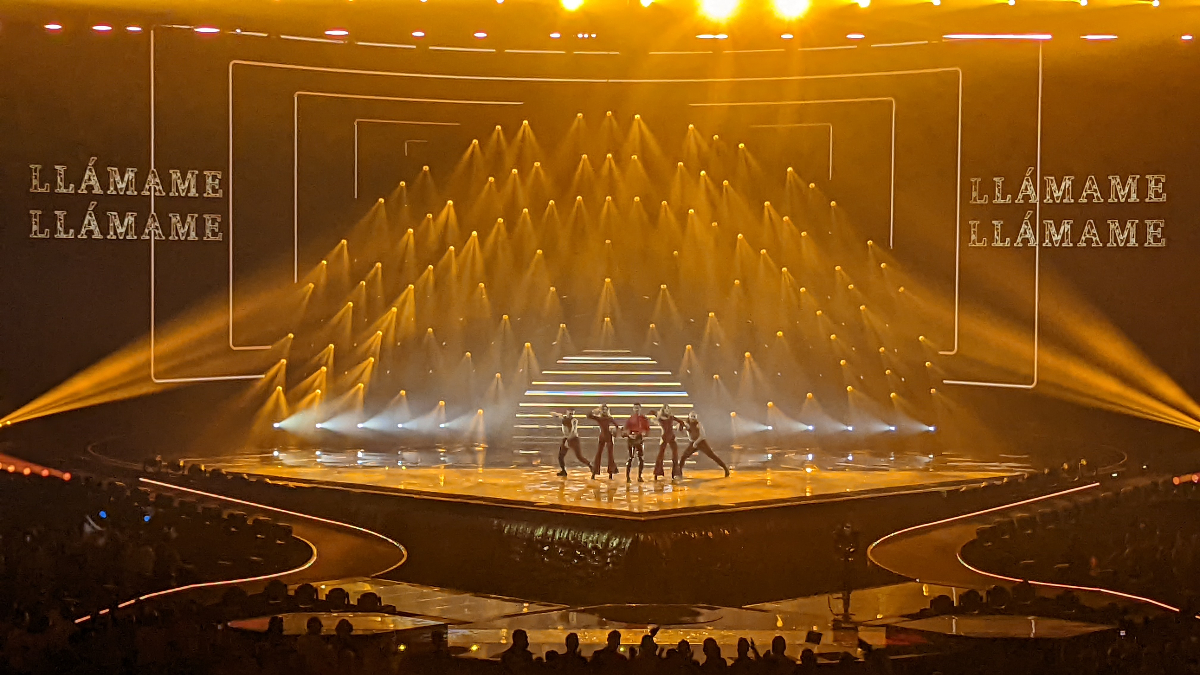
Wrs performing during the second semi-final

Wrs took part in technical rehearsals on 3 and 6 May, followed by dress rehearsals on 11 and 12 May. This included the jury show on 11 May where the professional juries of each country watched and voted on the competing entries.

The Romanian performance featured Wrs dressed in a long-sleeved red ruffled shirt and black leather trousers and performing together with four dancers. The performance began with focus on two of the dancers who are lit with a low level light to give a silhouette effect before the camera panned out to reveal Wrs who then performed a choreographed routine with the dancers throughout the song, which included Wrs' shirt being pulled off to reveal a silver bejewelled black vest top. The stage displayed red and yellow colours with the LED screens displaying the song lyrics and a golden pyrotechnic effect in the final chorus. The four dancers that joined Wrs on stage were Andrei Iulian Angelescu, Emanuel Neagu, Ruxandra Anamaria and Vivienne Meda, while an off-stage backing vocalist, Laurian Manta, was also featured for the performance. The stage director for the Romanian performance was Aurel Badea.

At the end of the show, Romania was announced as having finished in the top 10 and subsequently qualifying for the grand final. It was later revealed that Romania placed ninth in the semi-final, receiving a total of 118 points: 100 points from the televoting and 18 points from the juries.

=== Final ===
Shortly after the second semi-final, a winners' press conference was held for the ten qualifying countries. As part of this press conference, the qualifying artists took part in a draw to determine which half of the grand final they would subsequently participate in. This draw was done in the order the countries appeared in the semi-final running order. Romania was drawn to compete in the first half. Following this draw, the shows' producers decided upon the running order of the final, as they had done for the semi-finals. Romania was subsequently placed to perform in position 2, following the entry from the Czech Republic and before the entry from Portugal.

Wrs once again took part in dress rehearsals on 13 and 14 May before the final, including the jury final where the professional juries cast their final votes before the live show. Wrs performed a repeat of his semi-final performance during the final on 14 May. Romania placed eighteenth in the final, scoring 65 points: 53 points from the televoting and 12 points from the juries.

=== Voting ===
Voting during the three shows involved each country awarding two sets of points from 1–8, 10 and 12: one from their professional jury and the other from televoting. Each nation's jury consisted of five music industry professionals who are citizens of the country they represent. This jury judged each entry based on: vocal capacity; the stage performance; the song's composition and originality; and the overall impression by the act. In addition, each member of a national jury may only take part in the panel once every three years, and no jury was permitted to discuss of their vote with other members or be related in any way to any of the competing acts in such a way that they cannot vote impartially and independently. The individual rankings of each jury member in an anonymised form as well as the nation's televoting results were released shortly after the grand final.

Below is a breakdown of points awarded to Romania and awarded by Romania in the second semi-final and grand final of the contest, and the breakdown of the jury voting and televoting conducted during the two shows:

==== Points awarded to Romania ====
Points awarded to Romania (Semi-final 2)
Score	Televote	Jury
12 points	Spain	
10 points	Cyprus	
8 points	Belgium; San Marino	Germany
7 points	United Kingdom	
6 points	Azerbaijan; Serbia	
5 points	Georgia; Germany; Ireland; Malta; Poland	
4 points	Australia; Czech Republic	Israel; Spain
3 points	Finland; Sweden	
2 points	Estonia; Israel	Estonia
1 point		

Points awarded to Romania (Final)
Score	Televote	Jury
12 points		
10 points	Moldova; Spain	
8 points	Italy	
7 points		Greece
6 points		
5 points	Serbia	
4 points	Bulgaria; Cyprus	Spain
3 points	Malta; United Kingdom	
2 points	Greece; Ireland	
1 point	France; San Marino	Germany

==== Points awarded by Romania ====
Points awarded by Romania (Semi-final 2)
Score	Televote	Aggregated jury
12 points	Sweden	Sweden
10 points	Serbia	Australia
8 points	Estonia	Czech Republic
7 points	Cyprus	Estonia
6 points	Czech Republic	Belgium
5 points	Belgium	North Macedonia
4 points	Finland	Finland
3 points	Australia	Azerbaijan
2 points	San Marino	San Marino
1 point	Poland	Israel

Points awarded by Romania (Final)
Score	Televote	Aggregated jury
12 points	Moldova	Ukraine
10 points	Ukraine	Sweden
8 points	Spain	United Kingdom
7 points	Serbia	Portugal
6 points	Sweden	Australia
5 points	Estonia	Switzerland
4 points	Italy	Italy
3 points	United Kingdom	Netherlands
2 points	Norway	Greece
1 point	France	Spain

==== Jury vote issues ====
In a statement released during the broadcast of the grand final, the EBU revealed that six countries, including Romania, were found to have irregular jury voting patterns during the second semi-final. Consequently, these countries were given substitute aggregated jury scores for both the second semi-final and the grand final (shown above), calculated from the corresponding jury scores of countries with historically similar voting patterns as determined by the pots for the semi-final allocation draw held in January. Their televoting scores were unaffected. The Flemish broadcaster VRT later reported that the juries involved had made agreements to vote for each other's entries to secure qualification to the grand final.

During the broadcast of the final, Romania's votes were read by the EBU's Executive Supervisor, Martin Österdahl, instead of the scheduled spokesperson, Eda Marcus. This was attributed to connection difficulties during the voting, however the Azerbaijani broadcaster İTV, whose jury had also been identified as showing irregular voting patterns, released a statement implying that this was instead due to their refusal to present the calculated aggregate scores.

On 19 May, the EBU released a further statement clarifying the voting irregularities identified in the second semi-final. This confirmed that the six countries involved had consistently scored each other's entries disproportionately highly in the second semi-final: the Romanian jury, as well as the juries from Azerbaijan, Georgia and San Marino, had each ranked the other five countries' entries as their top five, proving beyond statistical coincidence that they had colluded to achieve a higher placing. This prompted the suspension of Romania's intended jury scores (shown below) in favour of the EBU's calculated aggregate scores, presented above.

The Romanian broadcaster TVR subsequently released a press statement revealing the Romanian jury's intended votes for the grand final, which had also been suspended. The statement went on to criticise the EBU for their communication and also suggested that other juries had participated in separate incidents of vote manipulation, although this was strongly refuted by the EBU. TVR concluded their statement by threatening the future participation of Romania in the contest as a result of the response to the incident. On 29 July, Romanian news outlet Impact.ro reported that TVR had dropped all objections towards the EBU regarding the exclusion of the Romanian jury.

Romania's suspended jury results (Semi-final 2)
Score	Jury
12 points	San Marino
10 points	Poland
8 points	Montenegro
7 points	Azerbaijan
6 points	Georgia
5 points	Australia
4 points	Estonia
3 points	North Macedonia
2 points	Serbia
1 point	Ireland

Romania's suspended jury results (Final)
Score	Jury
12 points	Moldova
10 points	Greece
8 points	Poland
7 points	Netherlands
6 points	Azerbaijan
5 points	Australia
4 points	Italy
3 points	Spain
2 points	Finland
1 point	Lithuania

Detailed voting results of Romania's suspended vote (Semi-final 2)
R/O	Country	Juror 1	Juror 2	Juror 3	Juror 4	Juror 5	Rank	Points
01	Finland	9	11	14	13	16	12	
02	Israel	8	15	13	15	13	13	
03	Serbia	16	8	10	5	7	9	2
04	Azerbaijan	6	4	7	8	1	4	7
05	Georgia	4	3	4	14	5	5	6
06	Malta	12	17	16	11	9	15	
07	San Marino	1	1	2	2	2	1	12
08	Australia	5	12	5	9	6	6	5
09	Cyprus	17	16	11	7	17	11	
10	Ireland	7	10	6	12	12	10	1
11	North Macedonia	14	7	9	4	10	8	3
12	Estonia	13	6	8	6	8	7	4
13	Romania							
14	Poland	3	5	1	1	3	2	10
15	Montenegro	2	2	3	3	4	3	8
16	Belgium	15	14	12	10	11	14	
17	Sweden	10	9	15	17	15	16	
18	Czech Republic	11	13	17	16	14	17	

Detailed voting results of Romania's suspended vote (Final)
R/O	Country	Juror 1	Juror 2	Juror 3	Juror 4	Juror 5	Rank	Points
01	Czech Republic	20	16	16	23	15	24	
02	Romania							
03	Portugal	14	23	12	13	4	11	
04	Finland	11	11	23	4	20	9	2
05	Switzerland	24	10	11	24	24	22	
06	France	12	12	24	10	12	19	
07	Norway	21	5	13	11	16	15	
08	Armenia	19	20	4	22	10	14	
09	Italy	18	7	14	6	9	7	4
10	Spain	5	19	6	17	17	8	3
11	Netherlands	16	4	7	9	2	4	7
12	Ukraine	22	21	15	18	5	17	
13	Germany	13	13	20	7	18	18	
14	Lithuania	4	24	10	12	23	10	1
15	Azerbaijan	7	14	8	8	8	5	6
16	Belgium	17	15	17	21	11	23	
17	Greece	2	1	3	3	3	2	10
18	Iceland	23	8	18	16	13	21	
19	Moldova	1	2	1	1	1	1	12
20	Sweden	6	18	21	20	22	20	
21	Australia	10	22	5	5	19	6	5
22	United Kingdom	8	9	9	15	14	12	
23	Poland	3	6	2	2	7	3	8
24	Serbia	15	3	22	19	21	13	
25	Estonia	9	17	19	14	6	16	

==== Detailed final results ====
Detailed voting results from Romania (Semi-final 2)
R/O	Country	Aggregated jury (Note: Romania was among the six countries whose jury results were found to have had irregular voting patterns. Their jury votes were substituted with aggregated jury results for the second semi-final and the final based on countries with similar voting patterns, as determined by the pots that the countries were put into for the semi-final allocation draw.)		Televote	
R/O	Country	Rank	Points	Rank	Points
01	Finland	7	4	7	4
02	Israel	10	1	13	
03	Serbia	15		2	10
04	Azerbaijan	8	3	14	
05	Georgia	13		17	
06	Malta	12		12	
07	San Marino	9	2	9	2
08	Australia	2	10	8	3
09	Cyprus	16		4	7
10	Ireland	14		11	
11	North Macedonia	6	5	15	
12	Estonia	4	7	3	8
13	Romania				
14	Poland	11		10	1
15	Montenegro	17		16	
16	Belgium	5	6	6	5
17	Sweden	1	12	1	12
18	Czech Republic	3	8	5	6

Detailed voting results from Romania (Final)
R/O	Country	Aggregated jury		Televote	
R/O	Country	Rank	Points	Rank	Points
01	Czech Republic	20		22	
02	Romania				
03	Portugal	4	7	19	
04	Finland	16		15	
05	Switzerland	6	5	21	
06	France	22		10	1
07	Norway	12		9	2
08	Armenia	17		18	
09	Italy	7	4	7	4
10	Spain	10	1	3	8
11	Netherlands	8	3	17	
12	Ukraine	1	12	2	10
13	Germany	19		20	
14	Lithuania	14		12	
15	Azerbaijan	13		23	
16	Belgium	15		16	
17	Greece	9	2	14	
18	Iceland	18		24	
19	Moldova	24		1	12
20	Sweden	2	10	5	6
21	Australia	5	6	13	
22	United Kingdom	3	8	8	3
23	Poland	21		11	
24	Serbia	23		4	7
25	Estonia	11		6	5

== See also ==
- List of music released by Romanian artists that has charted in major music markets
