= Cyprus in the Eurovision Song Contest 2022 =

- Eurovision Song Contest 2022
- Participating broadcaster: Cyprus Broadcasting Corporation (CyBC)
- Country: Cyprus
- Selection process: Internal selection
- Announcement date: 9 March 2022

Competing entry
- Song: "Ela"
- Artist: Andromache
- Songwriters: Alex Papaconstantinou; Arash; Eyelar Mirzazadeh; Fatjon Miftaraj; Filloreta "Fifi" Raçi; Geraldo Sandell; Giorgos Papadopoulos; Robert Uhlmann; Viktor Svensson; Yll Limani

Placement
- Semi-final result: Failed to qualify (12th)

Participation chronology

Cyprus was represented at the Eurovision Song Contest 2022 with the song "Ela", written by Alex Papaconstantinou, Arash, Eyelar Mirzazadeh, Fatjon Miftaraj, Filloreta "Fifi" Raçi, Geraldo Sandell, Giorgos Papadopoulos, Robert Uhlmann, Viktor Svensson, and Yll Limani, and performed by Andromache. The Cypriot participating broadcaster, the Cyprus Broadcasting Corporation (CyBC), internally selected its entry for the contest.

Cyprus was drawn to compete in the second semi-final of the Eurovision Song Contest which took place on 12 May 2022. Performing during the show in position 9, "Ela" was not announced among the top 10 entries of the second semi-final and therefore did not qualify to compete in the final. It was later revealed that Cyprus placed 12th out of the 18 participating countries in the semi-final with 63 points.

== Background ==
Prior to the 2022 contest, the Cyprus Broadcasting Corporation (CyBC) had participated in the Eurovision Song Contest representing Cyprus thirty-seven times since its first entry in 1981. Its best placing was at the 2018 contest where "Fuego" performed by Eleni Foureira placed second. Before that, its best result was fifth, achieved three times: in 1982 with the song "Mono i agapi" performed by Anna Vissi, in 1997 with "Mana mou" performed by Hara and Andreas Constantinou, and in 2004 with "Stronger Every Minute" performed by Lisa Andreas. Its least successful result was in 1986 when it placed last with the song "Tora zo" by Elpida, receiving only four points in total. However, its worst finish in terms of points received was when it placed second to last in 1999 with "Tha 'nai erotas" by Marlain Angelidou, receiving only two points. After returning to the contest in 2015 following its one-year absence from the 2014 due to the 2012–13 Cypriot financial crisis and the broadcaster's budget restrictions, it has qualified for the final of all the contests in which it has participated. This includes its latest participation in 2021, when "El Diablo" by Elena Tsagrinou ended 16th in the final with 94 points.

As part of its duties as participating broadcaster, CyBC organises the selection of its entry in the Eurovision Song Contest and broadcasts the event in the country. The broadcaster has used various methods to select its entry in the past, such as internal selections and televised national finals to choose the performer, song or both to compete at Eurovision. In 2015, CyBC organised the national final Eurovision Song Project, which featured 54 songs competing in a nine-week-long process resulting in the selection of its entry through the combination of public televoting and the votes from an expert jury. Since 2016, however, the broadcaster has opted to select the entry internally without input from the public.

== Before Eurovision ==
=== Internal selection ===
In September 2021, CEO of Panik Records George Arsenakos claimed that the label had signed an agreement with CyBC to establish a national final in order to select the Cypriot entrant for 2023. In January 2022, it was announced an agreement between the two parties is already in place for the 2022 selection and that the performance of the chosen act will be staged by Marvin Dietmann and Dan Shipton, both having previous experience at Eurovision.

Greek singer Andromachi Dimitropoulou, former contestant of The Voice of Greece, was rumoured to be the selected representative for Cyprus. The Cypriot radio programme Good Morning Show reported that the name of their national representative ended with -machi, and in addition to this, Dimitropoulou is signed with Panik Records. Dimitropoulou was officially announced as the Cypriot entrant with the song "Ela" on 9 March 2022 during the RIK 1 programme Ola ston Aera, where the music video, shot on 5 March in Athens, was also premiered.

== At Eurovision ==
According to Eurovision rules, all nations with the exceptions of the host country and the "Big Five" (France, Germany, Italy, Spain and the United Kingdom) are required to qualify from one of two semi-finals in order to compete for the final; the top ten countries from each semi-final progress to the final. The European Broadcasting Union (EBU) split up the competing countries into six different pots based on voting patterns from previous contests, with countries with favourable voting histories put into the same pot. On 25 January 2022, an allocation draw was held which placed each country into one of the two semi-finals, as well as which half of the show they would perform in. Cyprus has been placed into the second semi-final, to be held on 12 May 2022, and has been scheduled to perform in the first half of the show.

Once all the competing songs for the 2022 contest had been released, the running order for the semi-finals was decided by the shows' producers rather than through another draw, so that similar songs were not placed next to each other. Cyprus was set to perform in position 9, following the entry from Australia and before the entry from Ireland. They were not announced as one of the ten qualifiers, marking the first time Cyprus has failed to qualify since 2013. It was later announced that Cyprus placed twelfth in the semi-final with 63 points.

=== Voting ===
==== Points awarded to Cyprus ====
Points awarded to Cyprus (Semi-final 2)
Score	Televote	Jury
12 points	Azerbaijan	
10 points	Serbia	
8 points	Montenegro	
7 points	Romania	
6 points		
5 points	North Macedonia	
4 points	San Marino	Ireland
3 points	Poland	Finland
2 points		Sweden
1 point	Georgia; Malta; Spain; Sweden; United Kingdom	

==== Points awarded by Cyprus ====
Points awarded by Cyprus (Semi-final 2)
Score	Televote	Jury
12 points	Serbia	Sweden
10 points	Romania	Australia
8 points	Poland	Poland
7 points	Sweden	Estonia
6 points	Belgium	Azerbaijan
5 points	Czech Republic	Serbia
4 points	Australia	Czech Republic
3 points	Estonia	Belgium
2 points	Finland	Finland
1 point	Malta	Ireland

Points awarded by Cyprus (Final)
Score	Televote	Jury
12 points	Ukraine	Greece
10 points	Greece	Azerbaijan
8 points	Spain	Australia
7 points	Serbia	Ukraine
6 points	United Kingdom	Spain
5 points	Italy	Sweden
4 points	Romania	Serbia
3 points	Poland	United Kingdom
2 points	Lithuania	Belgium
1 point	Armenia	Italy

==== Detailed voting results ====
Detailed voting results from Cyprus (Semi-final 2)
R/O	Country	Jury							Televote	
R/O	Country	Juror A	Juror B	Juror C	Juror D	Juror E	Rank	Points	Rank	Points
01	Finland	7	11	12	11	7	9	2	9	2
02	Israel	13	9	8	9	16	11		11	
03	Serbia	4	2	14	12	5	6	5	1	12
04	Azerbaijan	17	12	1	1	10	5	6	13	
05	Georgia	11	7	15	14	14	14		16	
06	Malta	16	13	10	6	13	12		10	1
07	San Marino	15	14	11	8	15	15		12	
08	Australia	3	4	3	2	3	2	10	7	4
09	Cyprus									
10	Ireland	12	10	6	10	11	10	1	14	
11	North Macedonia	9	16	17	17	17	17		15	
12	Estonia	5	5	4	7	4	4	7	8	3
13	Romania	14	17	13	13	12	16		2	10
14	Poland	2	3	9	4	2	3	8	3	8
15	Montenegro	10	8	16	15	9	13		17	
16	Belgium	8	15	5	5	8	8	3	5	6
17	Sweden	1	1	2	3	1	1	12	4	7
18	Czech Republic	6	6	7	16	6	7	4	6	5

Detailed voting results from Cyprus (Final)
R/O	Country	Jury							Televote	
R/O	Country	Juror A	Juror B	Juror C	Juror D	Juror E	Rank	Points	Rank	Points
01	Czech Republic	11	19	9	20	6	13		24	
02	Romania	25	18	16	12	14	21		7	4
03	Portugal	21	24	22	23	21	25		21	
04	Finland	7	17	21	15	7	14		14	
05	Switzerland	20	13	20	6	18	17		23	
06	France	19	23	4	22	12	15		20	
07	Norway	18	9	6	9	16	11		13	
08	Armenia	17	14	23	18	17	22		10	1
09	Italy	9	16	5	10	22	10	1	6	5
10	Spain	16	12	1	2	8	5	6	3	8
11	Netherlands	13	22	10	21	23	20		18	
12	Ukraine	2	5	14	24	1	4	7	1	12
13	Germany	14	21	24	14	9	18		15	
14	Lithuania	23	20	17	13	24	23		9	2
15	Azerbaijan	4	4	2	1	11	2	10	22	
16	Belgium	10	6	13	8	10	9	2	19	
17	Greece	1	2	3	4	5	1	12	2	10
18	Iceland	15	25	25	25	25	24		25	
19	Moldova	24	15	18	11	15	19		11	
20	Sweden	6	11	7	7	3	6	5	12	
21	Australia	3	3	11	3	2	3	8	16	
22	United Kingdom	12	8	8	5	13	8	3	5	6
23	Poland	5	7	19	16	19	12		8	3
24	Serbia	22	1	15	19	4	7	4	4	7
25	Estonia	8	10	12	17	20	16		17	
