= United Kingdom in the Eurovision Song Contest 2022 =

- Eurovision Song Contest 2022
- Participating broadcaster: British Broadcasting Corporation (BBC)
- Country: United Kingdom
- Selection process: Internal selection
- Announcement date: 10 March 2022

Competing entry
- Song: "Space Man"
- Artist: Sam Ryder
- Songwriters: Sam Ryder; Amy Wadge; Max Wolfgang

Placement
- Final result: 2nd, 466 points

Participation chronology

The United Kingdom was represented at the Eurovision Song Contest 2022 with the song "Space Man", written by Sam Ryder, Amy Wadge, and Max Wolfgang, and performed by Ryder himself. The British participating broadcaster, the British Broadcasting Corporation (BBC), internally selected both the song and the performer, in collaboration with record label TaP Music and their management company.

Ryder performed in the second half of the Eurovision final, in 22nd position. He finished in second place with 466 points, winning the jury vote with 283 points, scoring the third highest jury votes by a contestant. Ryder also became the highest scoring UK Eurovision entrant and scored the UK its best result since 1998 and its first top three result since 2002. It also marked the 16th time that the UK had finished in second place in the contest.

An average of 9.3 million people watched the final on BBC One, with a peak viewing figure later reaching 10.6 million, the highest UK viewing figures for the contest since 2011. It was the most-watched televised programme in the UK of that year before being surpassed by the Platinum Party at the Palace, and delivered the largest number of viewers for the contest that year across all European markets. Furthermore, it was the fourth most watched show in the UK of 2022. "Space Man" peaked at number two on the UK Singles Chart, becoming the highest-charting UK Eurovision entry since "Ooh Aah... Just a Little Bit" by Gina G in 1996.

== Background ==
Prior to the 2022 contest, the British Broadcasting Corporation (BBC) has participated in the Eurovision Song Contest representing the United Kingdom 63 times. Thus far, it has won the contest five times: in 1967 with the song "Puppet on a String" performed by Sandie Shaw, in 1969 with the song "Boom Bang-a-Bang" performed by Lulu, in 1976 with "Save Your Kisses for Me" performed by Brotherhood of Man, in 1981 with the song "Making Your Mind Up" performed by Bucks Fizz and in 1997 with the song "Love Shine a Light" performed by Katrina and the Waves. To this point, the United Kingdom had been noted for having finished as the runner-up in a record 15 contests. Up to and including 1998, it had only twice finished outside the top 10, in 1978 and 1987. Since 1999, the year in which the rule was abandoned that songs must be performed in one of the official languages of the country participating, the UK had had less success, only finishing within the top ten twice, in 2002 with the song "Come Back" performed by Jessica Garlick, and in 2009 with the song "It's My Time" performed by Jade Ewen. In 2021, the song "Embers" performed by James Newman finished in last place, notably scoring a total of 0 points from both the juries and the televoting.

As part of its duties as participating broadcaster, the BBC organises the selection of its entry in the Eurovision Song Contest and broadcasts the event in the country. Between 2011 and 2015, the BBC opted to internally select its entry. For its 2016 entry, the broadcaster announced that a national final would be organised featuring a competition among several artists and songs. The same process was used in 2017 and 2018, and changes were brought in for 2019. In 2020 and 2021, the BBC opted to return to an internal selection, in collaboration with record label BMG.

== Before Eurovision ==
=== Internal selection ===
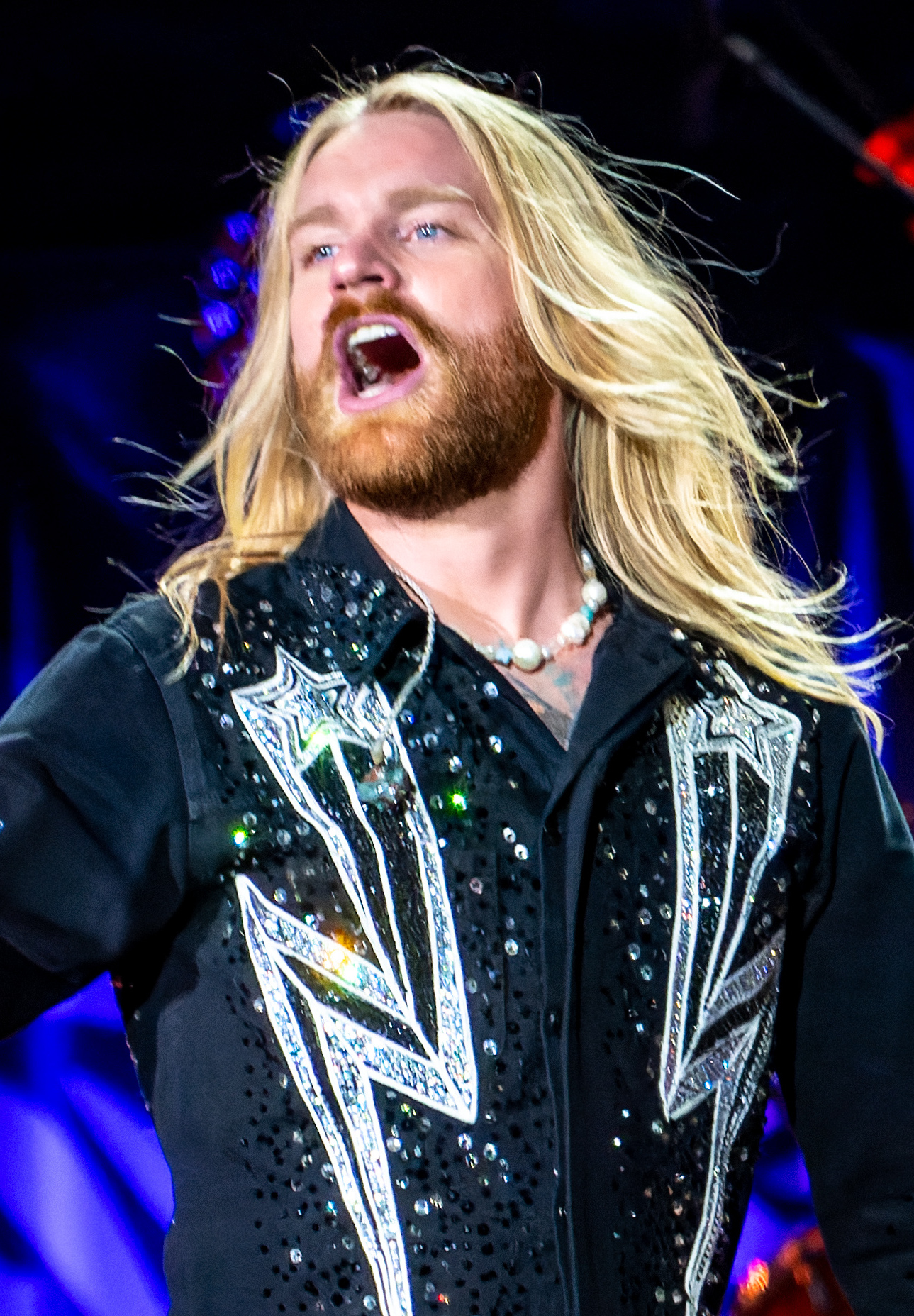
Sam Ryder was internally selected by the BBC.

On 21 October 2021, the day after the official list of participants in Eurovision 2022 was released, the BBC announced its plans for the British national selection, opting for an internal process no longer in collaboration with record label BMG, but with TaP Music instead. The management company's leading artists include Dua Lipa, Ellie Goulding and Lana Del Rey. Kate Phillips (BBC commissioning editor) stated that the new collaboration "will enable the BBC to tap into some great music talent" and that the broadcaster has "big ambitions for the 2022 contest". On 25 January 2022, TaP revealed that it had started shortlisting potential acts for the contest – with both established, emerging and brand new artists having approached it for Eurovision – and that it had worked with BBC Radio 1 and Scott Mills in order to choose the British representative.

In November 2021, Glasgow-based electropop duo HYYTS revealed they were in the running to represent the United Kingdom; which was confirmed during an interview with BBC Scotland's TV channel programme The Edit broadcast on 29 January 2022. It had been rumoured that Chelcee Grimes was chosen as the UK representative, being unofficially announced as the British entrant in early February during Jenni Falconer's morning show on Smooth London. Grimes herself later denied this on Twitter the same day. It had also been speculated that Sam Ryder would represent the country with his song "Space Man". Ryder was announced as the chosen entrant on 10 March 2022. "Space Man" was revealed as the entry on the same day by Mills on BBC Radio 1's breakfast show with Greg James, with the song having previously featured as 'Tune of the Week' on Mills' afternoon show on Radio 1.

"Having been a fan of Eurovision since I was a kid, I am so honoured to have been presented with the opportunity to sing at an event alongside some of Europe’s most talented creatives, performers and songwriters. I hope to sing my head off in a way the United Kingdom can be proud of, and to showcase a song I wrote with my friends last summer makes the whole experience even more special."

— Sam Ryder

=== Promotion ===
In order to promote "Space Man" as the British entry for the 2022 contest, Ryder embarked on a promotion tour throughout Europe. Following the announcement that he would be representing the UK at Eurovision, Space Man had its TV debut performance on BBC's The One Show, and he was interviewed on the same day. Ryder also promoted the song in Bulgaria on 21 March after filming the UK 'live-on-tape' backup performance in Sofia, alongside entrants from Bulgaria, Cyprus and Greece. Ryder also performed at the London Eurovision Party at London's Hard Rock Hotel venue on 3 April, the Eurovision in Concert 2022 at Amsterdam's AFAS Live on 9 April, and at the PrePartyES in Madrid's Sala La Riviera on 16 April. He also made appearances on Dutch radio stations on 7 April. On 14 April, he travelled to Belgrade, Serbia, in order to promote his entry on Serbian radio and on the Vece sa Ivanom Ivanovicem show. He then travelled to Madrid the day after for the PrePartyES. Ryder also made further promotional appearances in Greece, San Marino and Germany.

Following his interviews on This Morning and Good Morning Britain, he was praised for his positive attitude to see change in how the British public and press views the Eurovision Song Contest. On 22 April 2022, the song was performed at the York Hall for Eurovision House Party.

Prior to the contest, the BBC also released a documentary following Ryder's journey to Eurovision, with in-depth interviews and footage of the production process of "Space Man".

== At Eurovision ==
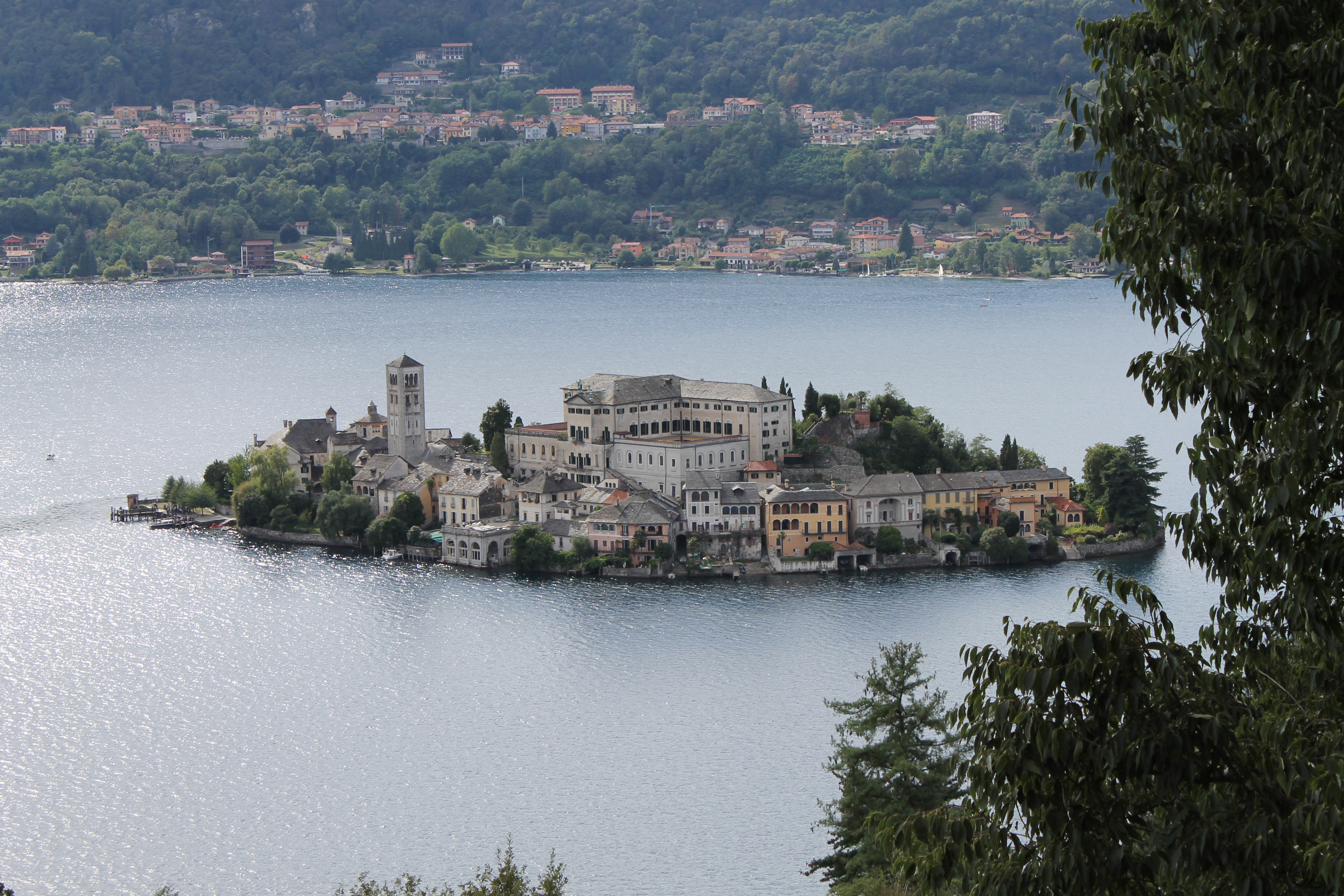
A video postcard introduced Sam Ryder's performance in the final of the Eurovision Song Contest 2022. The postcard was filmed in the small Italian town of Orta San Giulio on the San Giulio Island in the Province of Novara and featured virtual projections of Ryder across the location.

The Eurovision Song Contest 2022 took place at PalaOlimpico in Turin, Italy, and consisted of two semi-finals held on 10 and 12 May, and the final on 14 May 2022. As the United Kingdom is a member of the "Big Five", their entry directly qualified for the final, along with France, Germany, Spain, and Italy (also the host country in 2022). The United Kingdom performed in the second half of the final in position number 22. In addition to their participation in the final, the United Kingdom was also required to broadcast and vote in one of the two semi-finals. This was decided via a draw held during the semi-final allocation draw on 25 January 2022, when it was announced that the United Kingdom would be voting in the second semi-final.

Both semi-finals were broadcast on BBC Three and BBC iPlayer, with the commentary team consisting of Scott Mills and Rylan Clark. This marked the return of the Eurovision semi-finals to BBC Three for the first time since 2015, after four years of broadcasting the shows on BBC Four during BBC Three's tenure as an online channel. The final was broadcast on BBC One's regional variations across the UK with commentary by Graham Norton, and on BBC Radio 2 with commentary by Ken Bruce. This was the final contest to be commentated by Bruce. The BBC also broadcast a Eurovision after-party on BBC Radio 2, which was presented by OJ Borg. The BBC appointed AJ Odudu as its spokesperson to announce the top 12-point score awarded by the British jury during the final.

On 20 January 2022, it was announced that the BBC would move its coverage of the contest from London to Salford, meaning that the UK spokesperson in 2022, AJ Odudu, was the first to announce the points of the British jury live from Salford. It was later announced that the consultancy fees would be donated to the charitable organization Migrant Offshore Aid Station, in order to support individuals who were affected by the Russian invasion of Ukraine.

=== Final ===
Ryder took part in technical rehearsals on 5 and 7 May, followed by dress rehearsals on 11, 12 and 13 May. This included the semi-final jury show on 11 May, where an extended clip of the British performance, was filmed for broadcast during the live show on 12 May, and the jury final on 13 May, where the professional juries of each country watched and voted on the competing entries. After technical rehearsals, the "Big Five" countries held a press conference. As part of this press conference, the artists took part in a draw to determine which half of the grand final they would subsequently participate in. The United Kingdom was drawn to compete in the second half. Following the conclusion of the second semi-final, the shows' producers decided upon the running order of the final. The running order for the semi-finals and final was decided by the shows' producers rather than through another draw, so that similar songs were not placed next to each other. The United Kingdom was subsequently placed to perform in position 22, following the entry from Australia and before the entry from Poland.

The British performance featured Ryder performing on a predominately black and white stage theme, with smoke effects on the floor, while wearing trainers and a skydiver jumpsuit with intricate patterns, with an astronomical theme linking back to the meaning of "Space Man". The United Kingdom brought the largest prop of the contest, which was formed of three metal wings, while Ryder performed on a circular plinth in the centre. The prop moved during the course of the performance, and gradually lit up and opened. The performance also featured a guitar solo by Ryder, an adaptation of the studio cut of "Space Man". The United Kingdom placed second in the final, behind eventual winners Kalush Orchestra representing Ukraine. Ryder received a total of 466 points, finishing in first place with the juries and fifth place with the public: 183 points from the televoting and 283 points from the juries. This marked the highest number of points ever scored by the UK at the contest, the 16th time the UK finished second, and the country's best result since last hosting the event in 1998.

=== Voting ===
Below is a breakdown of points awarded to the United Kingdom in the final. Voting during the three shows involved each country awarding two sets of points from 1–8, 10 and 12: one from their professional jury and the other from televoting. The exact composition of the professional jury, and the results of each country's jury and televoting were released after the final; the individual results from each jury member were also released in an anonymised form. The British jury consisted of Adam Hunter, Denise Pearson, Eliot Kennedy, Matthew Xia (Excalibah), and Helen George. In the final, the United Kingdom placed 2nd with 466 points. This was the best British result achieved since 1998 and the most points ever attained at the contest by the United Kingdom. The final saw eight juries award top 12 points to the United Kingdom: Austria, Azerbaijan, Belgium, Czech Republic, France, Germany, Georgia, and Ukraine. The United Kingdom also received top 12 points in the public televote from Malta. Over the course of the contest, the UK awarded its 12 points to Sweden (jury) and Ireland (televote) in the second semi-final, and to Sweden (jury) and Ukraine (televote) in the final.

In the jury vote, the United Kingdom only failed to score points from Armenia, Australia, Croatia and Greece, while also receiving no points in the televote from Croatia, Montenegro, North Macedonia, Serbia and Slovenia.

==== Points awarded to the United Kingdom ====
Points awarded to the United Kingdom (Final)
Score	Televote	Jury
12 points	Malta	Austria; Azerbaijan; Belgium; Czech Republic; France; Georgia; Germany; Ukraine
10 points	Israel	Albania; Bulgaria; Finland; Israel; Lithuania; Moldova; Portugal
8 points	Austria; Azerbaijan; Netherlands; Spain	Ireland; Latvia; Malta; North Macedonia; Poland; Romania; San Marino; Sweden
7 points	Australia; Iceland; Ukraine	Iceland
6 points	Cyprus; Denmark; Germany; Ireland; Italy; Norway; Portugal; San Marino; Sweden	Denmark; Italy; Norway; Switzerland
5 points	Estonia; Greece; Switzerland	Montenegro
4 points	Albania; Georgia; Finland; Lithuania	Estonia; Netherlands
3 points	Belgium; Bulgaria; Latvia; Moldova; Poland; Romania	Cyprus; Spain
2 points	Czech Republic; France	Slovenia
1 point	Armenia	Serbia

==== Points awarded by the United Kingdom ====
Points awarded by the United Kingdom (Semi-final 2)
Score	Televote	Jury
12 points	Ireland	Sweden
10 points	Poland	Czech Republic
8 points	Czech Republic	Azerbaijan
7 points	Romania	North Macedonia
6 points	Serbia	Poland
5 points	Sweden	Serbia
4 points	Finland	Estonia
3 points	San Marino	Australia
2 points	Estonia	Belgium
1 point	Cyprus	Israel

Points awarded by the United Kingdom (Final)
Score	Televote	Jury
12 points	Ukraine	Sweden
10 points	Poland	Spain
8 points	Moldova	Poland
7 points	Lithuania	Azerbaijan
6 points	Norway	Australia
5 points	Spain	Estonia
4 points	Sweden	Greece
3 points	Romania	Portugal
2 points	Estonia	Switzerland
1 point	Serbia	Serbia

==== Detailed voting results ====
Each nation's jury consisted of five music industry professionals who are citizens of the country they represent, with their names published before the contest to ensure transparency. This jury judged each entry based on: vocal capacity; the stage performance; the song's composition and originality; and the overall impression by the act. In addition, no member of a national jury was permitted to be related in any way to any of the competing acts in such a way that they cannot vote impartially and independently. The individual rankings of each jury member as well as the nation's televoting results were released shortly after the grand final.

The following members comprised the British jury:

- Adam Hunter – songwriter, music producer, member of HYYTS
- Denise Pearson – singer-songwriter, music producer
- Eliot Kennedy – singer-songwriter
- Matthew Xia (Excalibah) – theatre director, DJ, composer, broadcaster, journalist
- Helen George – actress, TV host

Detailed voting results from the United Kingdom (Semi-final 2)
R/O	Country	Jury							Televote	
R/O	Country	Juror 1	Juror 2	Juror 3	Juror 4	Juror 5	Rank	Points	Rank	Points
01	Finland	12	14	13	9	16	17		7	4
02	Israel	5	3	12	13	11	10	1	14	
03	Serbia	10	10	15	2	3	6	5	5	6
04	Azerbaijan	1	6	3	15	14	3	8	17	
05	Georgia	2	11	14	12	17	12		12	
06	Malta	17	15	6	18	13	16		13	
07	San Marino	15	12	18	5	12	13		8	3
08	Australia	4	1	10	16	18	8	3	11	
09	Cyprus	14	17	16	8	15	18		10	1
10	Ireland	9	16	7	4	10	11		1	12
11	North Macedonia	8	4	17	7	2	4	7	16	
12	Estonia	18	5	2	6	9	7	4	9	2
13	Romania	13	13	11	10	8	14		4	7
14	Poland	3	9	5	14	4	5	6	2	10
15	Montenegro	16	18	9	17	6	15		18	
16	Belgium	6	7	4	11	7	9	2	15	
17	Sweden	11	2	1	1	5	1	12	6	5
18	Czech Republic	7	8	8	3	1	2	10	3	8

Detailed voting results from the United Kingdom (Final)
R/O	Country	Jury							Televote	
R/O	Country	Juror 1	Juror 2	Juror 3	Juror 4	Juror 5	Rank	Points	Rank	Points
01	Czech Republic	10	16	10	7	11	12		18	
02	Romania	11	17	12	13	15	17		8	3
03	Portugal	8	10	9	21	2	8	3	14	
04	Finland	4	22	19	12	19	14		11	
05	Switzerland	14	9	3	6	21	9	2	24	
06	France	23	23	24	24	22	24		17	
07	Norway	7	12	18	20	13	16		5	6
08	Armenia	19	21	15	15	23	22		20	
09	Italy	21	8	4	16	16	11		12	
10	Spain	1	7	7	5	3	2	10	6	5
11	Netherlands	22	20	11	10	18	20		16	
12	Ukraine	20	11	16	14	7	15		1	12
13	Germany	15	19	17	23	24	23		15	
14	Lithuania	13	18	20	17	4	13		4	7
15	Azerbaijan	18	5	1	4	9	4	7	22	
16	Belgium	17	14	13	22	17	21		21	
17	Greece	5	13	8	8	5	7	4	13	
18	Iceland	9	24	22	18	10	18		23	
19	Moldova	16	15	23	11	12	19		3	8
20	Sweden	3	1	5	1	1	1	12	7	4
21	Australia	2	3	6	9	20	5	6	19	
22	United Kingdom									
23	Poland	6	4	2	3	14	3	8	2	10
24	Serbia	24	2	21	19	6	10	1	10	1
25	Estonia	12	6	14	2	8	6	5	9	2

== After Eurovision ==
The successful result of the United Kingdom in the Eurovision Song Contest 2022 was greeted with tremendous reception across the UK, with commentators Graham Norton stating that the result was a "fairytale ending to an incredible evening" and Ken Bruce proclaiming that "the feeling is that the UK has broken the taboo of bad results". An average of 8.9 million viewers watched the final, with a peak of 10.6 million during the voting sequence. This equalled a 55% share of the market over the four hours of the final, equalling record viewing figures achieved in 2011. Shortly after the final, the UK head of delegation Andrew Cartmell verbally confirmed the country's participation in the 2023 contest, stating that the UK aims to maintain the success of 2022 for the following year. Sam Ryder stated that he was "delighted with the result" and that "the UK will be a force to be reckoned with in the future of Eurovision". On 16 May 2022, Ryder was awaited by a crowd of fans and press at London's Heathrow Airport to celebrate his success.

"Space Man" topped The Official Big Top 40 charts after the contest. The song reached the top 15 in Lithuania and Sweden and the top 30 in Iceland. It reached number 22 in Ireland, becoming the highest charting UK Eurovision entry on the Irish Singles Chart since 2014. It also charted in the Netherlands and Switzerland.

Following Ryder's Eurovision success, on 18 May 2022, he was announced as one of the headliners for the BBC's Platinum Jubilee concert, Platinum Party at the Palace, on 4 June 2022, where he performed a Jubilee version of "Space Man" outside Buckingham Palace in front of an estimated 22,000 spectators.

On 25 July 2022, the EBU, Ukrainian broadcaster UA:PBC and the BBC announced that the 2023 contest would be held in the UK, after Ukraine was unable to meet the demands of hosting the event due to security concerns caused by the Russian invasion of the country, with the UK being chosen to host after the country's second-place finish in 2022.

=== Awards and nominations ===
Ryder won the Marcel Bezençon Press Award, and became the first UK act to win a Bezençon Award.

Year	Award ceremony	Category	Nominee(s)/work(s)	Result	Ref.
2022	Marcel Bezençon Awards	Press Award	Himself	Won	
