= Belgium in the Eurovision Song Contest 2022 =

- Eurovision Song Contest 2022
- Participating broadcaster: Radio-télévision belge de la Communauté française (RTBF)
- Country: Belgium
- Selection process: Internal selection
- Announcement date: Artist: 15 September 2021; Song: 10 March 2022

Competing entry
- Song: "Miss You"
- Artist: Jérémie Makiese
- Songwriters: Jérémie Makiese; Mike BGRZ; Manon Romiti; Paul Ivory; Silvio Lisbonne

Placement
- Semi-final result: Qualified (8th, 151 points)
- Final result: 19th, 64 points

Participation chronology

Belgium was represented at the Eurovision Song Contest 2022 with the song "Miss You", written by Jérémie Makiese, Mike BGRZ, Manon Romiti, Paul Ivory, and Silvio Lisbonne, and performed by Makiese himself. The Belgian participating broadcaster, Walloon Radio-télévision belge de la Communauté française (RTBF), internally selected its entry for the contest. The artist was announced on 15 September 2021, and the song was presented to the public on 10 March 2022.

Belgium was drawn to compete in the second semi-final of the Eurovision Song Contest which took place on 12 May 2022. Performing during the show in position 16, "Miss You" was announced among the top 10 entries of the second semi-final and therefore qualified to compete in the final on 14 May. It was later revealed that Belgium placed eighth out of the 18 participating countries in the semi-final with 151 points. In the final, Belgium performed in position 16 and placed nineteenth out of the 25 participating countries, scoring 64 points.

== Background ==
Prior to the 2022 contest, Belgium had participated in the Eurovision Song Contest sixty-two times since its debut as one of seven countries to take part in 1956. Since then, the country has won the contest on one occasion in 1986 with the song "J'aime la vie" performed by Sandra Kim. Following the introduction of semi-finals for the 2004 contest, Belgium had been featured in only seven finals. In 2021, "The Wrong Place" by Hooverphonic qualified to the final and placed nineteenth.

The Belgian participation in the contest alternates between two broadcasters: Flemish Vlaamse Radio- en Televisieomroeporganisatie (VRT) and Walloon Radio-télévision belge de la Communauté française (RTBF) at the time, with both broadcasters sharing the broadcasting rights. Both broadcasters –and their predecessors– have selected the Belgian entry using national finals and internal selections in the past. In 2019 and 2021, both VRT and RTBF internally selected their entries. On 19 August 2021, RTBF confirmed its participation in the 2022 contest and continued the internal selection procedure.

== Before Eurovision ==
=== Internal selection ===
The Belgian entry for the 2022 Eurovision Song Contest was selected via an internal selection by RTBF. On 15 September 2021, the broadcaster announced during the VivaCité radio programme Le 8/9 that they had selected Jérémie Makiese to represent Belgium in Turin. Makiese was the winner of the ninth series of the reality singing competition The Voice Belgique. The song Makiese would perform at the contest, "Miss You", was presented to the public on 10 March 2022 during Le 8/9. The song was written by Jérémie Makiese himself along with Mike BGRZ, Manon Romiti, Paul Ivory and Silvio Lisbonne. The music video for the song, filmed in Mons and Quaregnon and directed by Mehdi Semoulin, was released on the same day of the presentation.

=== Promotion ===
Jérémie Makiese made several appearances across Europe to specifically promote "Miss You" as the Belgian Eurovision entry. On 3 April, Makiese performed during the London Eurovision Party, which was held at the Hard Rock Hotel in London, United Kingdom and hosted by Paddy O'Connell and SuRie. On 9 April, Makiese performed during the Eurovision in Concert event which was held at the AFAS Live venue in Amsterdam, Netherlands and hosted by Cornald Maas and Edsilia Rombley. On 16 April, Makiese performed during the PrePartyES 2022 event which was held at the Sala La Riviera venue in Madrid, Spain and hosted by Ruth Lorenzo. In addition to his international appearances, Jérémie Makiese performed "Miss You" on 14 April during the final of the tenth series of The Voice Belgique on La Une.

== At Eurovision ==
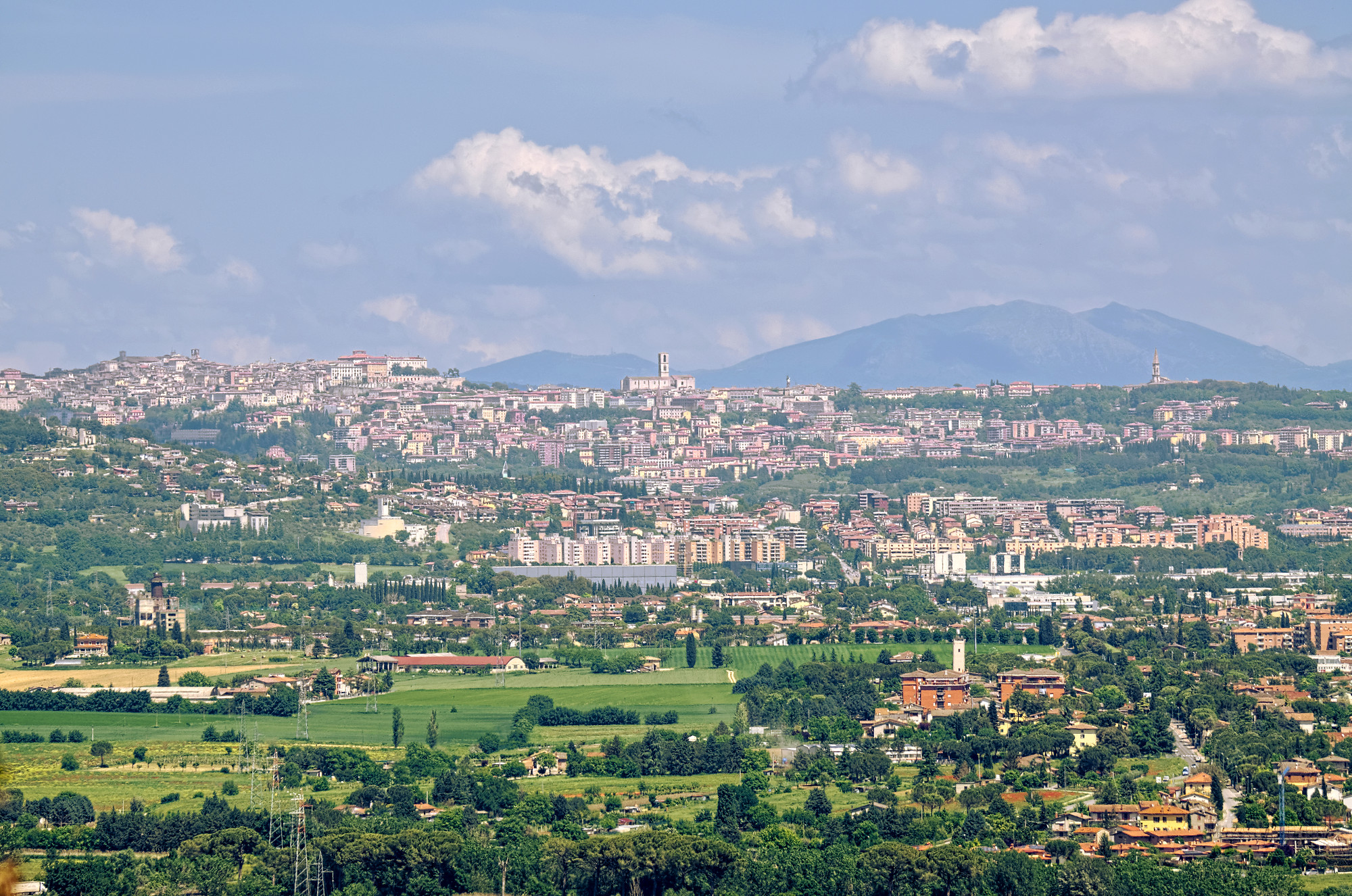
A video postcard introduced Jérémie Makiese's performance in the second semi-final and final of the Eurovision Song Contest 2022. The postcard was filmed at Perugia in the Province of Umbria and featured virtual projections of Makiese across the location.

According to Eurovision rules, all nations with the exceptions of the host country and the "Big Five" (France, Germany, Italy, Spain and the United Kingdom) are required to qualify from one of two semi-finals in order to compete for the final; the top ten countries from each semi-final progress to the final. The European Broadcasting Union (EBU) split up the competing countries into six different pots based on voting patterns from previous contests, with countries with favourable voting histories put into the same pot. On 25 January 2022, an allocation draw was held which placed each country into one of the two semi-finals, as well as which half of the show they would perform in. Belgium has been placed into the second semi-final, to be held on 12 May 2022, and has been scheduled to perform in the second half of the show.

Once all the competing songs for the 2022 contest had been released, the running order for the semi-finals was decided by the shows' producers rather than through another draw, so that similar songs were not placed next to each other. Belgium was set to perform in position 16, following the entry from Montenegro and before the entry from Sweden.

The two semi-finals and the final was broadcast in Belgium by both the Flemish and Walloon broadcasters. VRT broadcast the shows on één with commentary in Dutch by Peter Van de Veire. RTBF televised the shows on La Une and VivaCité with commentary in French by Jean-Louis Lahaye and Maureen Louys; the first semi-final aired on a 35-minute delay on La Une. The Belgian spokesperson, who announced the top 12-point score awarded by the Belgian jury during the final, was David Jeanmotte.

=== Semi-final ===
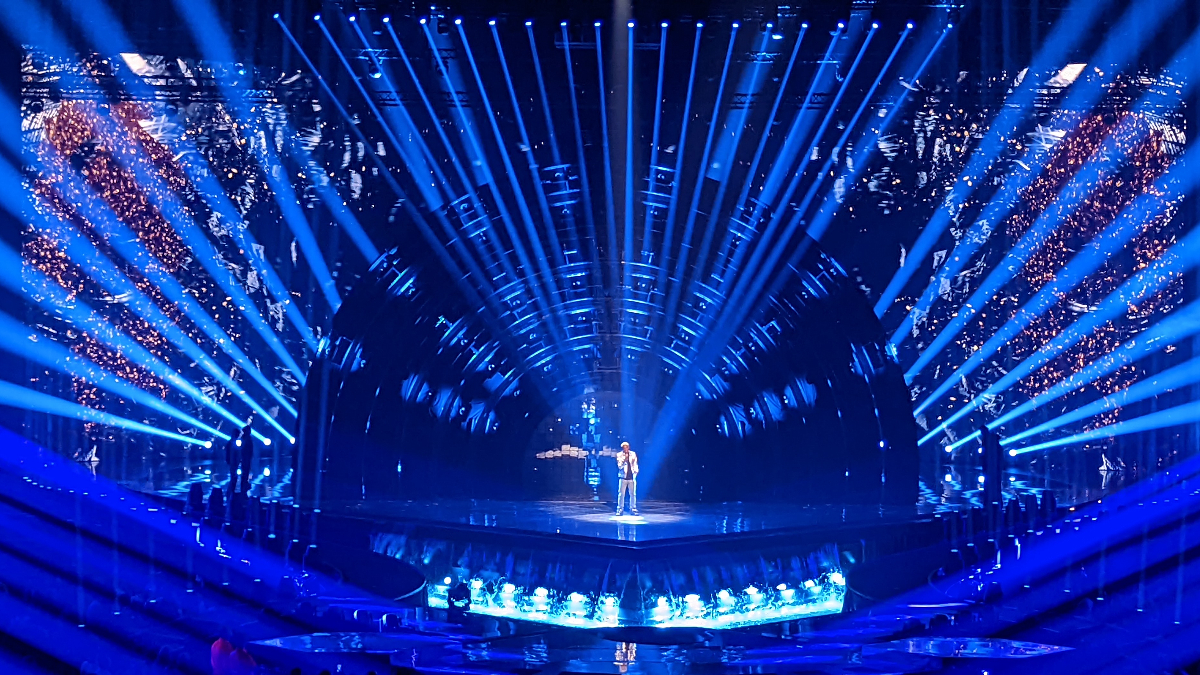
Jérémie Makiese performing during the second semi-final

Jérémie Makiese took part in technical rehearsals on 3 and 6 May, followed by dress rehearsals on 11 and 12 May. This included the jury show on 11 May where the professional juries of each country watched and voted on the competing entries.

The Belgian performance featured Jérémie Makiese dressed in a silver jacket with jeans and a black shirt, and performing choreography on stage together with four dancers who were dressed in black. The performance began with Makiese alone on stage with the dancers joining him from the second verse onwards. The stage and the LED screens both displayed blue and red colours. The dancers that joined Jérémie Makiese during the performance were: Alpha Lopez, Cédric Libambu, Malik Zaryaty and Shean Assal.

At the end of the show, Belgium was announced as having finished in the top 10 and subsequently qualifying for the grand final. It was later revealed that Belgium placed eighth in the semi-final, receiving a total of 151 points: 46 points from the televoting and 105 points from the juries.

=== Final ===
Shortly after the second semi-final, a winners' press conference was held for the ten qualifying countries. As part of this press conference, the qualifying artists took part in a draw to determine which half of the grand final they would subsequently participate in. This draw was done in the order the countries appeared in the semi-final running order. Belgium was drawn to compete in the second half. Following this draw, the shows' producers decided upon the running order of the final, as they had done for the semi-finals. Belgium was subsequently placed to perform in position 16, following the entry from Azerbaijan and before the entry from Greece.

Jérémie Makiese once again took part in dress rehearsals on 13 and 14 May before the final, including the jury final where the professional juries cast their final votes before the live show. Jérémie Makiese performed a repeat of his semi-final performance during the final on 14 May. Belgium placed nineteenth in the final, scoring 64 points: 5 points from the televoting and 59 points from the juries.

=== Voting ===
Voting during the three shows involved each country awarding two sets of points from 1-8, 10 and 12: one from their professional jury and the other from televoting. Each nation's jury consisted of five music industry professionals who are citizens of the country they represent. This jury judged each entry based on: vocal capacity; the stage performance; the song's composition and originality; and the overall impression by the act. In addition, each member of a national jury may only take part in the panel once every three years, and no jury was permitted to discuss of their vote with other members or be related in any way to any of the competing acts in such a way that they cannot vote impartially and independently. The individual rankings of each jury member in an anonymised form as well as the nation's televoting results were released shortly after the grand final.

Below is a breakdown of points awarded to Belgium and awarded by Belgium in the second semi-final and grand final of the contest, and the breakdown of the jury voting and televoting conducted during the two shows:

==== Points awarded to Belgium ====
Points awarded to Belgium (Semi-final 2)
Score	Televote	Jury
12 points		
10 points		North Macedonia
8 points		Australia; Montenegro; Spain; Sweden
7 points	Estonia	Israel
6 points	Cyprus	Czech Republic; Poland; Romania; Serbia
5 points	Montenegro; Romania; Sweden	Azerbaijan; Estonia; Georgia; Germany; San Marino
4 points	Azerbaijan; North Macedonia	
3 points	Serbia	Cyprus
2 points	Ireland	Ireland; United Kingdom
1 point	Finland; Germany; Israel; Poland; San Marino	

Points awarded to Belgium (Final)
Score	Televote	Jury
12 points		
10 points		
8 points		Serbia
7 points		Italy
6 points		Bulgaria; France; Netherlands
5 points		Australia; Spain
4 points	Netherlands	Israel; Moldova
3 points		North Macedonia
2 points		Albania; Cyprus
1 point	Moldova	Sweden

==== Points awarded by Belgium ====
Points awarded by Belgium (Semi-final 2)
Score	Televote	Jury
12 points	Poland	San Marino
10 points	Sweden	Sweden
8 points	Romania	Australia
7 points	Estonia	Israel
6 points	Serbia	Poland
5 points	Czech Republic	Finland
4 points	Finland	Czech Republic
3 points	Australia	Azerbaijan
2 points	Malta	Serbia
1 point	Ireland	Ireland

Points awarded by Belgium (Final)
Score	Televote	Jury
12 points	Ukraine	United Kingdom
10 points	Netherlands	Spain
8 points	Moldova	Italy
7 points	Poland	Sweden
6 points	Spain	Ukraine
5 points	Sweden	Portugal
4 points	Italy	Serbia
3 points	United Kingdom	Azerbaijan
2 points	Serbia	Czech Republic
1 point	Portugal	Australia

==== Detailed voting results ====
The following members comprised the Belgian jury:

- Alex Germys - Producer, DJ
- Elia Rose - Singer
- Joël Habay - TV editor
- Plain Jane - Singer
- Rino Gallo - Journalist

Detailed voting results from Belgium (Semi-final 2)
R/O	Country	Jury							Televote	
R/O	Country	Juror A	Juror B	Juror C	Juror D	Juror E	Rank	Points	Rank	Points
01	Finland	7	9	6	1	14	6	5	7	4
02	Israel	1	8	7	8	3	4	7	11	
03	Serbia	2	17	14	17	10	9	2	5	6
04	Azerbaijan	14	1	5	16	12	8	3	14	
05	Georgia	3	16	16	15	8	11		15	
06	Malta	15	5	11	12	16	14		9	2
07	San Marino	4	3	2	6	1	1	12	13	
08	Australia	8	2	3	5	5	3	8	8	3
09	Cyprus	9	15	9	7	15	13		12	
10	Ireland	10	4	13	13	9	10	1	10	1
11	North Macedonia	16	12	8	10	13	15		16	
12	Estonia	11	6	10	14	7	12		4	7
13	Romania	13	10	15	9	17	16		3	8
14	Poland	6	11	4	3	6	5	6	1	12
15	Montenegro	17	14	17	11	11	17		17	
16	Belgium									
17	Sweden	5	13	1	2	4	2	10	2	10
18	Czech Republic	12	7	12	4	2	7	4	6	5

Detailed voting results from Belgium (Final)
R/O	Country	Jury							Televote	
R/O	Country	Juror A	Juror B	Juror C	Juror D	Juror E	Rank	Points	Rank	Points
01	Czech Republic	22	6	20	12	2	9	2	23	
02	Romania	24	12	24	20	24	23		11	
03	Portugal	3	17	17	5	7	6	5	10	1
04	Finland	15	23	9	7	18	14		18	
05	Switzerland	14	9	11	19	5	12		21	
06	France	13	21	19	9	20	19		16	
07	Norway	9	16	13	11	17	17		14	
08	Armenia	16	13	14	21	23	22		13	
09	Italy	5	3	3	4	12	3	8	7	4
10	Spain	4	4	1	3	8	2	10	5	6
11	Netherlands	20	19	6	14	14	15		2	10
12	Ukraine	6	15	7	2	19	5	6	1	12
13	Germany	18	18	15	10	22	21		20	
14	Lithuania	11	11	22	23	3	11		15	
15	Azerbaijan	19	1	12	15	9	8	3	22	
16	Belgium									
17	Greece	12	10	5	16	15	13		19	
18	Iceland	21	22	23	22	21	24		24	
19	Moldova	10	20	21	17	13	20		3	8
20	Sweden	7	8	4	6	6	4	7	6	5
21	Australia	8	5	10	8	10	10	1	17	
22	United Kingdom	1	2	2	1	1	1	12	8	3
23	Poland	23	14	8	13	16	18		4	7
24	Serbia	2	24	16	24	4	7	4	9	2
25	Estonia	17	7	18	18	11	16		12	
