= Azerbaijan in the Eurovision Song Contest 2022 =

- Eurovision Song Contest 2022
- Country: Azerbaijan
- Selection process: Internal selection
- Announcement date: Artist: 16 February 2022; Song: 21 March 2022

Competing entry
- Song: "Fade to Black"
- Artist: Nadir Rustamli
- Songwriters: Andreas Stone Johansson; Anderz Wrethov; Sebastian Schub; Thomas Stengaard

Placement
- Semi-final result: Qualified (10th, 96 points)
- Final result: 16th, 106 points

Participation chronology

Azerbaijan was represented at the Eurovision Song Contest 2022 with the song "Fade to Black" performed by Nadir Rustamli who was internally selected by the Azerbaijani broadcaster İctimai Television (İTV) to represent the nation at the 2022 contest. Nadir Rustamli's selection as the Azerbaijani Eurovision entrant was announced on 16 February 2022, while the song "Fade to Black" was presented to the public on 21 March.

Azerbaijan was drawn to compete in the second semi-final of the Eurovision Song Contest which took place on 12 May 2022. Performing during the show in position 4, "Fade to Black" was announced among the top 10 entries of the second semi-final and therefore qualified to compete in the final on 14 May. In the final, Azerbaijan performed in position 15 and placed sixteenth out of the 25 participating countries, scoring 106 points.

== Background ==
Prior to the 2022 contest, Azerbaijan has participated in the Eurovision Song Contest thirteen times since its first entry in 2008. Azerbaijan had won the contest on one occasion in 2011 with the song "Running Scared" performed by Ell and Nikki. Since their debut in 2008, Azerbaijan has had a string of successful results, qualifying to the final in every contest until in 2018 when they failed to qualify with the song "X My Heart" performed by Aisel. Azerbaijan has placed in the top ten seven times, including a third-place result in 2009 with the song "Always" performed by AySel and Arash and a second-place result in 2013 with the song "Hold Me" performed by Farid Mammadov. In 2021, Azerbaijan placed twentieth with the song "Mata Hari" performed by Efendi.

The Azerbaijani national broadcaster, İctimai Television (İTV), broadcasts the event within Azerbaijan and organises the selection process for the nation's entry. İTV confirmed their intentions to participate at the 2022 Eurovision Song Contest on 20 September 2021. Azerbaijan had used various methods to select the Azerbaijani entry in the past, including internal selections of both the artist and song, as well as national finals to select their artist followed by an internal selection to determine the song. Between 2011 and 2013, Azerbaijan organized a national final titled Milli Seçim Turu to select the performer, song or both for Eurovision. In 2014, the broadcaster utilised an existing talent show format titled Böyük Səhnə where the winning performer would subsequently be given an internally selected song. Since 2015, the broadcaster internally selected both the artist and song that represented Azerbaijan, a procedure which continued for the selection of their 2022 entry.

== Before Eurovision ==
=== Internal selection ===
Both the artist and song that represented Azerbaijan at the Eurovision Song Contest 2022 was selected internally by İTV. On 30 December 2021, the broadcaster called for interested songwriters to submit their entries to the broadcaster by 31 January 2022. Songwriters could be of any nationality. On 16 February 2022, İTV announced during the morning show Sabahın xeyir, Azərbaycan that Nadir Rustamli would represent Azerbaijan. In January 2022, Rustamli won the second season of the Azerbaijani version of the reality television singing competition The Voice: The Voice of Azerbaijan. On 21 March 2022, İTV announced that Rustamli would be performing the song "Fade to Black". The song was selected from four potential songs shortlisted among 300 submissions from local and international songwriters. "Fade to Black" was written by Andreas Stone Johansson, Anderz Wrethov, Sebastian Schub and Thomas Stengaard, and was presented on the same day via the release of the official music video.

=== Promotion ===
Nadir Rustamli made several appearances across Europe to specifically promote "Fade to Black" as the Azerbaijani Eurovision entry. On 16 April, Rustamli performed during the PrePartyES 2022 event which was held at the Sala La Riviera venue in Madrid, Spain and hosted by Ruth Lorenzo. On 30 April, Rustamli performed during the Adriatic PreParty which was held online and organised by Hrvatski Eurovizijski Klub.

== At Eurovision ==
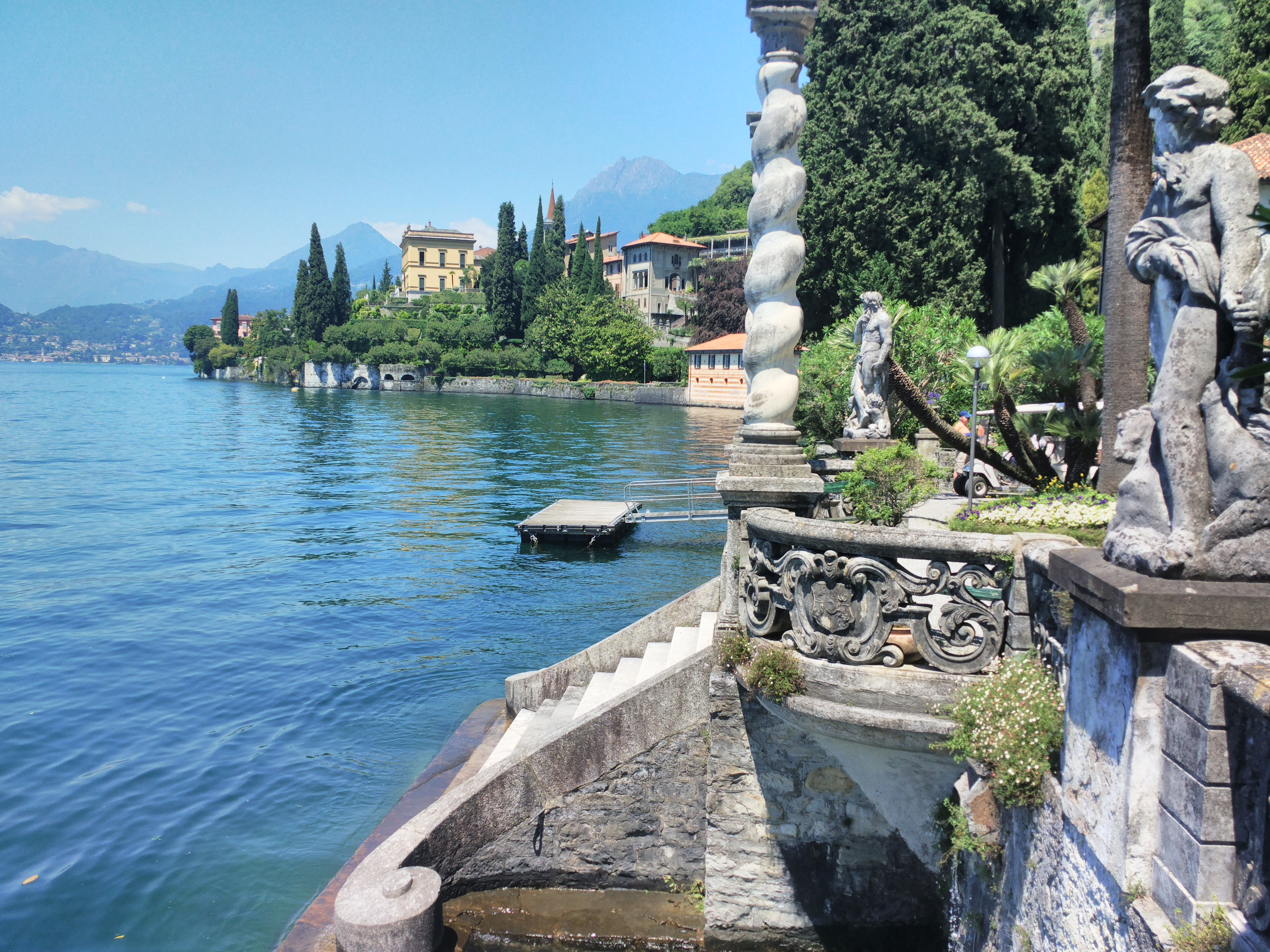
A video postcard introduced the Azerbaijani performance in the second semi-final and final of the Eurovision Song Contest 2022. The postcard was filmed at the Villa Monastero in the Province of Lombardy and featured virtual projections of Nadir Rustamli across the location.

According to Eurovision rules, all nations with the exceptions of the host country and the "Big Five" (France, Germany, Italy, Spain and the United Kingdom) are required to qualify from one of two semi-finals in order to compete for the final; the top ten countries from each semi-final progress to the final. The European Broadcasting Union (EBU) split up the competing countries into six different pots based on voting patterns from previous contests, with countries with favourable voting histories put into the same pot. On 25 January 2022, an allocation draw was held which placed each country into one of the two semi-finals, as well as which half of the show they would perform in. Azerbaijan was placed into the second semi-final, to be held on 12 May 2022, and has been scheduled to perform in the first half of the show.

Once all the competing songs for the 2022 contest had been released, the running order for the semi-finals was decided by the shows' producers rather than through another draw, so that similar songs were not placed next to each other. Azerbaijan was set to perform in position 4, following the entry from Serbia and before the entry from Georgia.

The two semi-finals and final were broadcast in Azerbaijan on İTV with commentary by Murad Arif. The Azerbaijani spokesperson, who announced the top 12-point score awarded by the Azerbaijani jury during the final, was supposed to be Narmin Salmanova, however during the broadcast of the final, Azerbaijan's jury votes were read by the EBU's Executive Supervisor Martin Österdahl. This was attributed to connection difficulties during the voting.

=== Semi-final ===
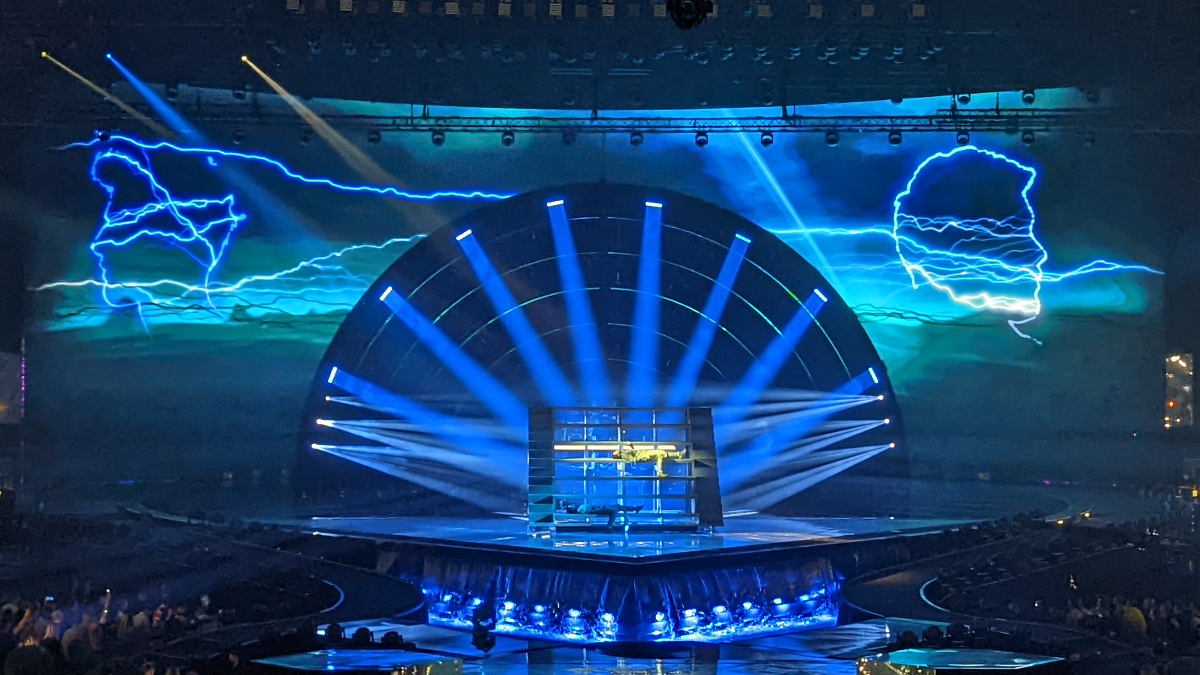
Nadir Rustamli performing during the second semi-final

Nadir Rustamli took part in technical rehearsals on 2 and 5 May, followed by dress rehearsals on 11 and 12 May. This included the jury show on 11 May where the professional juries of each country watched and voted on the competing entries.

The Azerbaijani performance featured Nadir Rustamli dressed in a gray outfit performing with a dancer. The performance began with Rustamli and the dancer on a bleacher prop with the former near the top row and the latter on the bottom row. The performers mimicked each other's movements which included sitting, lying and walking across the seats. Towards the end of the song, the prop split into two with the performers on opposite sides. The stage lighting transitioned between white, red and blue colours and the LED screens displayed lightning effects. In regards to the performance, which was directed by Mads Enggaard, Rustamli stated: "The staircase represents stepping away from the past and moving forward. At the end of the staircase, I face my fears, insecurities, and all of the dark thoughts I've been through. Then I fight through them, and win." The dancer that joined Nadir Rustamli on stage was Luc Boris André.

At the end of the show, Azerbaijan was announced as having finished in the top 10 and subsequently qualifying for the grand final. It was later revealed that Azerbaijan placed tenth in the semi-final, receiving a total of 96 points: 0 points from the televoting and 96 points from the juries.

=== Final ===
Shortly after the second semi-final, a winners' press conference was held for the ten qualifying countries. As part of this press conference, the qualifying artists took part in a draw to determine which half of the grand final they would subsequently participate in. This draw was done in the order the countries appeared in the semi-final running order. Azerbaijan was drawn to compete in the second half. Following this draw, the shows' producers decided upon the running order of the final, as they had done for the semi-finals. Azerbaijan was subsequently placed to perform in position 15, following the entry from Lithuania and before the entry from Belgium.

Nadir Rustamli once again took part in dress rehearsals on 13 and 14 May before the final, including the jury final where the professional juries cast their final votes before the live show. Nadir Rustamli performed a repeat of his semi-final performance during the final on 14 May. Azerbaijan placed sixteenth in the final, scoring 106 points: 3 points from the televoting and 103 points from the juries.

=== Voting ===
==== Points awarded to Azerbaijan ====
Points awarded to Azerbaijan (Semi-final 2)
Score	Televote	Jury
12 points		Spain
10 points		Germany
8 points		Serbia; United Kingdom
7 points		Finland
6 points		Cyprus; Estonia
5 points		Montenegro; Sweden
4 points		Czech Republic; Georgia; Malta; San Marino
3 points		Australia; Belgium; Poland; Romania
2 points		
1 point		North Macedonia

Points awarded to Azerbaijan (Final)
Score	Televote	Jury
12 points		Greece; Serbia; Spain
10 points		Cyprus
8 points		
7 points		San Marino; Sweden; United Kingdom
6 points		Germany
5 points		Ukraine
4 points		North Macedonia
3 points	Georgia	Albania; Belgium; Bulgaria; Estonia; Finland
2 points		Australia; Malta
1 point		Moldova; Montenegro

==== Points awarded by Azerbaijan ====
Points awarded by Azerbaijan (Semi-final 2)
Score	Televote	Aggregated jury
12 points	Cyprus	Sweden
10 points	Israel	Australia
8 points	Sweden	Poland
7 points	Australia	Estonia
6 points	Romania	Czech Republic
5 points	Finland	Belgium
4 points	Belgium	Finland
3 points	Malta	Serbia
2 points	Czech Republic	Malta
1 point	Poland	Israel

Points awarded by Azerbaijan (Final)
Score	Televote	Aggregated jury
12 points	Ukraine	United Kingdom
10 points	Spain	Italy
8 points	United Kingdom	Sweden
7 points	Norway	Portugal
6 points	Serbia	Ukraine
5 points	Italy	Spain
4 points	Sweden	Netherlands
3 points	Greece	Greece
2 points	Australia	Poland
1 point	Poland	France

==== Jury vote issues ====
In a statement released during the broadcast of the grand final, the EBU revealed that six countries, including Azerbaijan, were found to have 'irregular' jury voting patterns during the second semi-final. Consequently, these countries were given substitute aggregated jury scores for both the second semi-final and the grand final (shown above), calculated from the corresponding jury scores of countries with historically similar voting patterns as determined by the pots for the semi-final allocation draw held in January. Their televoting results were unaffected. The Flemish broadcaster VRT reported that the juries involved had made agreements to vote for each other's entries to secure qualification to the grand final. After the Azerbaijani jury votes were announced by Martin Österdahl instead of the scheduled spokesperson, İTV released a statement implying that this was instead due to their refusal to present the calculated aggregate scores. The statement went on to request clarity from the EBU over the issue and also revealed that the Azerbaijani jury would have awarded 12 points to Ukraine under the original scores rather than to the United Kingdom.

On 19 May, the EBU issued a further statement clarifying the voting irregularities identified in the second semi-final. This confirmed that the six countries involved had consistently ranked each other's entries disproportionately highly: the Azerbaijani jury, as well as the juries from Georgia, Romania and San Marino, had each ranked the other five countries' entries as their top five, proving beyond statistical coincidence that they had colluded to achieve a higher placing. This prompted the suspension of Azerbaijan's intended jury scores (shown below) in favour of the EBU's calculated aggregate scores, shown above.

Azerbaijan's suspended jury results (Semi-final 2)
Score	Country
12 points	Poland
10 points	Georgia
8 points	Romania
7 points	Montenegro
6 points	San Marino
5 points	Finland
4 points	Australia
3 points	Sweden
2 points	Serbia
1 point	North Macedonia

Detailed voting results of Azerbaijan's suspended vote (Semi-final 2)
R/O	Country	Juror 1	Juror 2	Juror 3	Juror 4	Juror 5	Rank	Points
01	Finland	10	11	3	4	9	6	5
02	Israel	16	17	16	15	14	16	
03	Serbia	7	8	7	10	7	9	2
04	Azerbaijan							
05	Georgia	3	2	2	1	3	2	10
06	Malta	15	6	11	14	10	12	
07	San Marino	1	5	15	5	16	5	6
08	Australia	9	9	4	3	15	7	4
09	Cyprus	6	16	8	17	6	11	
10	Ireland	17	14	17	16	17	17	
11	North Macedonia	8	7	9	9	8	10	1
12	Estonia	11	10	12	13	13	13	
13	Romania	5	12	5	6	1	3	8
14	Poland	2	1	1	2	2	1	12
15	Montenegro	4	3	6	7	5	4	7
16	Belgium	14	15	10	11	11	14	
17	Sweden	12	4	13	8	4	8	3
18	Czech Republic	13	13	14	12	12	15	

==== Detailed final results ====
Detailed voting results from Azerbaijan (Semi-final 2)
R/O	Country	Aggregated jury (Note: Azerbaijan was among the six countries whose jury results were found to have had irregular voting patterns. Their jury votes were substituted with aggregated jury results for the second semi-final and the final based on countries with similar voting patterns, as determined by the pots that the countries were put into for the semi-final allocation draw.)		Televote	
R/O	Country	Rank	Points	Rank	Points
01	Finland	7	4	6	5
02	Israel	10	1	2	10
03	Serbia	8	3	11	
04	Azerbaijan				
05	Georgia	13		12	
06	Malta	9	2	8	3
07	San Marino	16		14	
08	Australia	2	10	4	7
09	Cyprus	17		1	12
10	Ireland	14		15	
11	North Macedonia	12		17	
12	Estonia	4	7	16	
13	Romania	11		5	6
14	Poland	3	8	10	1
15	Montenegro	15		13	
16	Belgium	6	5	7	4
17	Sweden	1	12	3	8
18	Czech Republic	5	6	9	2

Detailed voting results from Azerbaijan (Final)
R/O	Country	Aggregated jury		Televote	
R/O	Country	Rank	Points	Rank	Points
01	Czech Republic	14		21	
02	Romania	21		15	
03	Portugal	4	7	19	
04	Finland	19		12	
05	Switzerland	11		22	
06	France	10	1	17	
07	Norway	16		4	7
08	Armenia	17		24	
09	Italy	2	10	6	5
10	Spain	6	5	2	10
11	Netherlands	7	4	13	
12	Ukraine	5	6	1	12
13	Germany	20		18	
14	Lithuania	24		14	
15	Azerbaijan				
16	Belgium	15		16	
17	Greece	8	3	8	3
18	Iceland	22		23	
19	Moldova	18		11	
20	Sweden	3	8	7	4
21	Australia	12		9	2
22	United Kingdom	1	12	3	8
23	Poland	9	2	10	1
24	Serbia	23		5	6
25	Estonia	13		20	
