= Switzerland in the Eurovision Song Contest 2022 =

- Eurovision Song Contest 2022
- Participating broadcaster: Swiss Broadcasting Corporation (SRG SSR)
- Country: Switzerland
- Selection process: Internal selection
- Announcement date: 8 March 2022

Competing entry
- Song: "Boys Do Cry"
- Artist: Marius Bear
- Songwriters: Marius Hügli; Martin Gallop

Placement
- Semi-final result: Qualified (9th, 118 points)
- Final result: 17th, 78 points

Participation chronology

Switzerland was represented at the Eurovision Song Contest 2022 with the song "Boys Do Cry", written by Marius Hügli and Martin Gallop, and performed by Hügli himself under his stage name Marius Bear. Hügli was internally selected by the Swiss broadcaster Swiss Broadcasting Corporation (SRG SSR) to represent the nation at the 2022 contest. "Boys Do Cry" was presented to the public as the Swiss entry on 8 March 2022.

Switzerland was drawn to compete in the first semi-final of the Eurovision Song Contest which took place on 10 May 2022. Performing during the show in position 4, "Boys Do Cry" was announced among the top 10 entries of the first semi-final and therefore qualified to compete in the final on 18 May. It was later revealed that Switzerland placed ninth out of the 17 participating countries in the semi-final with 118 points. In the final, Switzerland performed in position 5 and placed seventeenth out of the 25 participating countries, scoring 78 points.

== Background ==
Prior to the 2022 contest, Switzerland had participated in the Eurovision Song Contest sixty-one times since its first entry in 1956. Switzerland is noted for having won the first edition of the Eurovision Song Contest with the song "Refrain" performed by Lys Assia. Their second and, to this point, most recent victory was achieved in 1988 when Canadian singer Céline Dion won the contest with the song "Ne partez pas sans moi". Following the introduction of semi-finals for the 2004, Switzerland had managed to participate in the final four times up to this point. In 2005, the internal selection of Estonian girl band Vanilla Ninja, performing the song "Cool Vibes", qualified Switzerland to the final where they placed 8th. Due to their successful result in 2005, Switzerland was pre-qualified to compete directly in the final in 2006. Between 2007 and 2010, the nation failed to qualify to the final after a string of internal selections. Opting to organize a national final between 2011 and 2018, Switzerland has managed to qualify to the final twice out of the last eight years. After returning to an internal selection in 2019, Switzerland has managed to qualify to the final in both contests they participated in since and yielded two top five results, including in 2021, when Gjon's Tears and his song "Tout l'univers" placed third.

The Swiss national broadcaster, Swiss Broadcasting Corporation (SRG SSR), broadcasts the event within Switzerland and organises the selection process for the nation's entry. SRG SSR confirmed their intentions to participate at the 2022 Eurovision Song Contest on 2 April 2021. Along with their participation confirmation, the broadcaster announced that the Swiss entry for the 2022 contest would be selected internally. Switzerland has selected their entry for the Eurovision Song Contest through both national finals and internal selections in the past. Between 2011 and 2018, the broadcaster has opted to organize a national final in order to select their entry. Since 2019, the Swiss entry was internally selected for the competition.

== Before Eurovision ==
=== Internal selection ===
SRG SSR opened a submission period between 1 September 2021 and 15 September 2021 for interested artists and composers to submit their entries. Artists and songwriters of any nationality were able to submit songs; however those with a Swiss passport or residency were given priority. Songs shortlisted from the received submissions were then tested by their music producers with various artists and the combination of a 100-member public panel (50%) and the votes of a 23-member international expert jury (50%) selected the Swiss entry. The members of the public panel were Swiss residents put together according to selected criteria in cooperation with Digame, while the international jury consisted of members who had been national juries for their respective countries at the Eurovision Song Contest.

Members of the International Jury
| Name | Country | Profession |
|---|---|---|
| Pete Watson | United Kingdom | Keyboardist |
| Mark De-Lisser | United Kingdom | Vocal coach |
| Henrik Johnsson | Sweden | Television presenter and producer |
| Grzegorz Urban | Poland | Composer, arranger, pianist |
| Argyro Christodoulidou | Cyprus | Composer, songwriter |
| Amie Borgar | Finland | Music coordinator |
| Gore Melian | Armenia | Singer, songwriter, producer |
| Ilinca Băcilă | Romania | Singer, actress, represented Romania in the 2017 contest |
| Ludmila Kuts | Belarus | Singer |
| Milan Havrda | Czech Republic | Producer |
| Julian Le Play | Austria | Singer, songwriter, radio presenter |
| Samuli Väänänen | Finland | Musician, music journalist, presenter, programmer |
| Pænda | Austria | Singer, producer, musician, represented Austria in the 2019 contest |
| Florent Luyckx | Netherlands | Radio executive |
| Karl-Ander Reismann | Estonia | Songwriter, music producer |
| Ovidiu Jacobsen | Romania | Songwriter, musician, producer, represented Romania in the 2010 and 2014 contests |
| Deivydas Zvonkus | Lithuania | Composer, producer |
| Anders Øhrstrøm | Denmark | Singer, composer, music producer, sound designer, vocal coach |
| Helga Möller | Iceland | Singer, represented Iceland in the 1986 contest as member of ICY |
| Tinkara Kovač | Slovenia | Singer, flautist, represented Slovenia in the 2014 contest |
| Maria Marcus | Sweden | Music producer, songwriter |
| Alexey Gross | Belarus | Singer |
| Gordon Groothedde | Netherlands | Composer, producer |

On 6 March 2022, Swiss newspaper Blick claimed that "Boys Do Cry" performed by Marius Bear would be the Swiss entry for the Eurovision Song Contest 2022, which was subsequently confirmed on 8 March 2022 via the release of the official music video of the song on the official Eurovision Song Contest's YouTube channel. "Boys Do Cry" was written by Marius Bear together with Martin Gallop. In regards to the song, Marius Bear stated: "I learnt very early on that I don't need to be ashamed of my feelings. As a man, I’m not afraid to cry and to lay bare my weaknesses to my audience. I don't want to wear emotional armour, I want to be who I am. And I want to encourage my audience to do the same."

=== Promotion ===
Marius Bear specifically promoted "Boys Do Cry" as the Swiss Eurovision entry on 16 April 2022 by performing during the PrePartyES 2022 event which was held at the Sala La Riviera venue in Madrid, Spain and hosted by Ruth Lorenzo. On 19 March, Marius Bear recorded his 'live-on-tape' performance in Sofia, Bulgaria, which would have been used in the event that he was unable to travel to Turin, or subjected to quarantine on arrival.

== At Eurovision ==
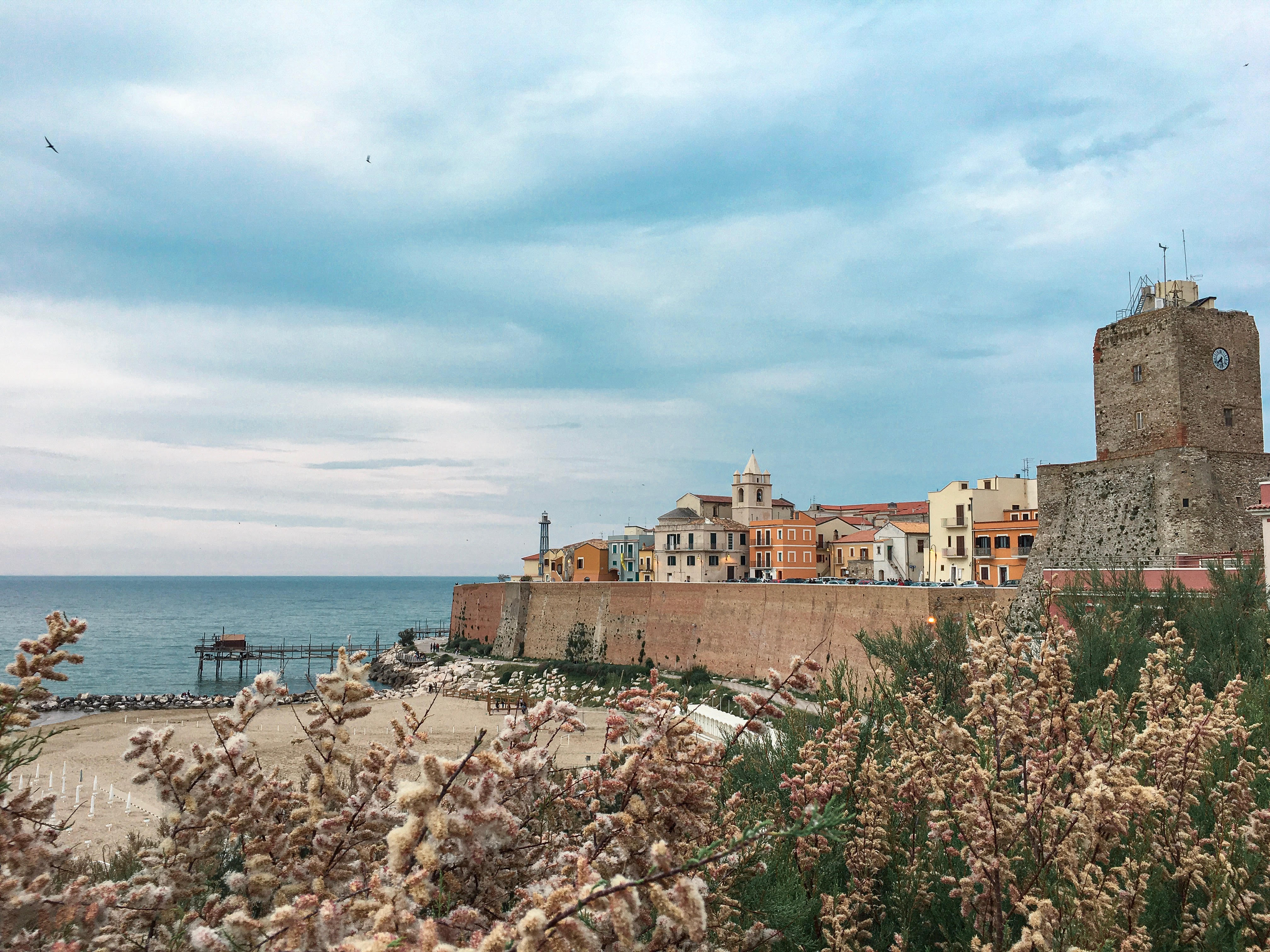
A video postcard introduced Bear's performance in the first semi-final and final of the Eurovision Song Contest 2022. The postcard was filmed in the small town of Termoli in the Province of Campobasso in Molise and featured virtual projections of Marius Bear across the location.

According to Eurovision rules, all nations with the exceptions of the host country and the "Big Five" (France, Germany, Italy, Spain and the United Kingdom) are required to qualify from one of two semi-finals in order to compete for the final; the top ten countries from each semi-final progress to the final. The European Broadcasting Union (EBU) split up the competing countries into six different pots based on voting patterns from previous contests, with countries with favourable voting histories put into the same pot. On 25 January 2022, an allocation draw was held which placed each country into one of the two semi-finals, as well as which half of the show they would perform in. Switzerland was placed into the first semi-final, which was held on 10 May 2022, and has been scheduled to perform in the first half of the show.

Once all the competing songs for the 2022 contest had been released, the running order for the semi-finals was decided by the shows' producers rather than through another draw, so that similar songs were not placed next to each other. Switzerland was set to perform in position 4, following the entry from Lithuania and before the entry from Slovenia.

In Switzerland, three broadcasters that form SRG SSR aired the contest. Sven Epiney provided German commentary for both semi-finals airing on SRF zwei as well as SRF info for the second semi-final and the final airing on SRF 1. Jean-Marc Richard and 2021 Swiss Eurovision Song Contest entrant Gjon's Tears provided French commentary for the semi-finals on RTS 2 and the final on RTS 1. Clarissa Tami provided Italian commentary for both semi-finals on RSI La 2 and then was joined by Francesca Margiotta (who also joined Tami for the first semi-final) and Boris Piffaretti (who also joined Tami for the second semi-final) to provide commentary for the final on RSI La 1. The Swiss spokesperson, who announced the top 12-point score awarded by the Swiss jury during the final, was Julie Berthollet.

=== Semi-final ===
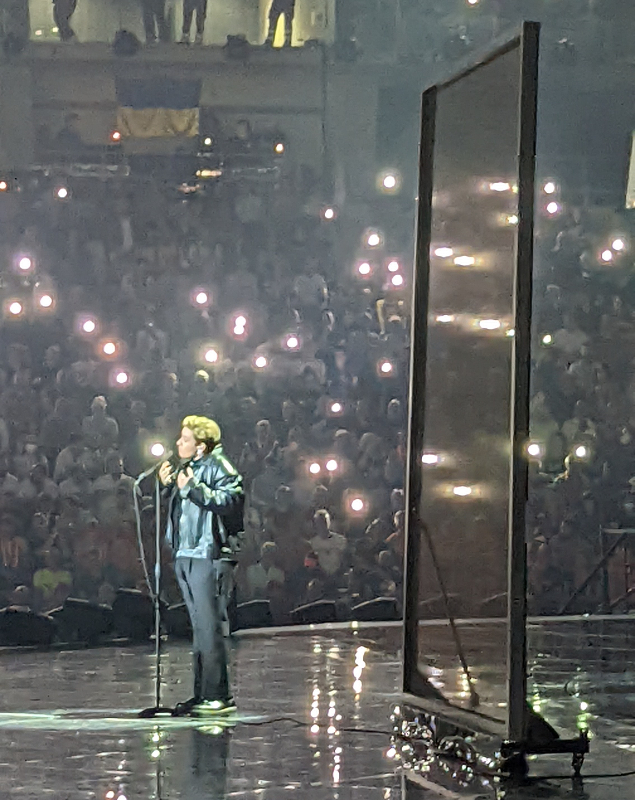
Marius Bear performing during the semi-final

Marius Bear took part in technical rehearsals on 30 April and 4 May, followed by dress rehearsals on 9 and 10 May. This included the jury show on 9 May where the professional juries of each country watched and voted on the competing entries.

The Swiss performance featured Marius Bear performing alone on stage in a black leather jacket. The stage setting was predominately dark with and the performance also featured technical effects including the shadow of a little boy playing behind Bear and a broken heart being projected onto Bear's face before sliding down to the floor. The creative director of the Swiss performance was Sacha Jean-Baptiste, who had previously worked with the nation's performances since 2019.

At the end of the show, Switzerland was announced as having finished in the top 10 and subsequently qualifying for the grand final. It was later revealed that Switzerland placed ninth in the semi-final, receiving a total of 118 points: 11 points from the televoting and 107 points from the juries.

=== Final ===
Shortly after the first semi-final, a winners' press conference was held for the ten qualifying countries. As part of this press conference, the qualifying artists took part in a draw to determine which half of the grand final they would subsequently participate in. This draw was done in the order the countries appeared in the semi-final running order. Switzerland was drawn to compete in the first half. Following this draw, the shows' producers decided upon the running order of the final, as they had done for the semi-finals. Switzerland was subsequently placed to perform in position 5, following the entry from Finland and before the entry from France.

Marius Bear once again took part in dress rehearsals on 13 and 14 May before the final, including the jury final where the professional juries cast their final votes before the live show. Marius Bear performed a repeat of his semi-final performance during the final on 14 May. Switzerland placed seventeenth in the final, scoring 78 points: 0 points from the televoting and 78 points from the juries.

=== Voting ===
Below is a breakdown of points awarded to Switzerland during the first semi-final and final. Voting during the three shows involved each country awarding two sets of points from 1–8, 10 and 12: one from their professional jury and the other from televoting. The exact composition of the professional jury, and the results of each country's jury and televoting were released after the final; the individual results from each jury member were also released in an anonymised form. The Swiss jury consisted of Anna Känzig, Elias Bertini, Sandro Dietrich, Veronica Tracchia, and Yvan Franel. In the first semi-final, Switzerland finished in ninth place out of seventeen entries, marking Switzerland's third consecutive qualification to the grand final. The first semi-final saw Switzerland receive twelve points from Bulgaria in the jury vote. Over the course of the contest, Switzerland awarded its 12 points to Netherlands (jury) and Portugal (televote) in the first semi-final and to Greece (jury) and Serbia (televote) in the final.

==== Points awarded to Switzerland ====
Points awarded to Switzerland (Semi-final 1)
| Score | Televote | Jury |
|---|---|---|
| 12 points | | Bulgaria |
| 10 points | | Lithuania; Moldova |
| 8 points | | |
| 7 points | | Austria; Netherlands |
| 6 points | | Albania; Croatia; Denmark; Italy; Ukraine |
| 5 points | | Armenia; France; Iceland |
| 4 points | | Latvia; Norway; Portugal; Slovenia |
| 3 points | Austria; Lithuania | |
| 2 points | Netherlands | |
| 1 point | Armenia; Denmark; Iceland | |

Points awarded to Switzerland (Final)
| Score | Televote | Jury |
|---|---|---|
| 12 points | | |
| 10 points | | Netherlands |
| 8 points | | |
| 7 points | | Bulgaria; Lithuania; Moldova |
| 6 points | | Czech Republic; Ukraine |
| 5 points | | Poland; Romania; Slovenia |
| 4 points | | |
| 3 points | | Italy; Latvia |
| 2 points | | Denmark; Germany; Portugal; United Kingdom |
| 1 point | | Austria; Croatia; North Macedonia; Norway; San Marino; Spain |

==== Points awarded by Switzerland ====
Points awarded by Switzerland (Semi-final 1)
| Score | Televote | Jury |
|---|---|---|
| 12 points | Portugal | Netherlands |
| 10 points | Ukraine | Greece |
| 8 points | Albania | Ukraine |
| 7 points | Moldova | Norway |
| 6 points | Croatia | Iceland |
| 5 points | Armenia | Denmark |
| 4 points | Austria | Portugal |
| 3 points | Lithuania | Lithuania |
| 2 points | Netherlands | Latvia |
| 1 point | Iceland | Armenia |

Points awarded by Switzerland (Final)
| Score | Televote | Jury |
|---|---|---|
| 12 points | Serbia | Greece |
| 10 points | Ukraine | Netherlands |
| 8 points | Italy | Spain |
| 7 points | Portugal | Sweden |
| 6 points | Spain | United Kingdom |
| 5 points | United Kingdom | Portugal |
| 4 points | Moldova | Australia |
| 3 points | Sweden | Ukraine |
| 2 points | Germany | Italy |
| 1 point | Poland | Norway |

==== Detailed voting results ====
The following members comprised the Swiss jury:

- Anna Känzig – Singer-songwriter
- Elias Bertini – Singer-songwriter
- Sandro Dietrich – Singer, producer, composer
- Veronica Tracchia – Artist
- Yvan Franel – Singer

Detailed voting results from Switzerland (Semi-final 1)
| R/O | Country | Jury | | | | | | | Televote | |
| R/O | Country | Juror 1 | Juror 2 | Juror 3 | Juror 4 | Juror 5 | Rank | Points | Rank | Points |
|---|---|---|---|---|---|---|---|---|---|---|
| 01 | Albania | 12 | 16 | 16 | 16 | 13 | 16 | | 3 | 8 |
| 02 | Latvia | 9 | 1 | 13 | 13 | 12 | 9 | 2 | 14 | |
| 03 | Lithuania | 10 | 5 | 6 | 10 | 5 | 8 | 3 | 8 | 3 |
| 04 | Switzerland | | | | | | | | | |
| 05 | Slovenia | 14 | 13 | 11 | 6 | 16 | 13 | | 16 | |
| 06 | Ukraine | 6 | 9 | 10 | 2 | 1 | 3 | 8 | 2 | 10 |
| 07 | Bulgaria | 15 | 11 | 9 | 11 | 15 | 14 | | 15 | |
| 08 | Netherlands | 1 | 4 | 1 | 1 | 3 | 1 | 12 | 9 | 2 |
| 09 | Moldova | 8 | 10 | 15 | 14 | 7 | 12 | | 4 | 7 |
| 10 | Portugal | 11 | 15 | 2 | 3 | 14 | 7 | 4 | 1 | 12 |
| 11 | Croatia | 13 | 6 | 8 | 8 | 9 | 11 | | 5 | 6 |
| 12 | Denmark | 2 | 8 | 4 | 12 | 11 | 6 | 5 | 13 | |
| 13 | Austria | 16 | 12 | 14 | 15 | 10 | 15 | | 7 | 4 |
| 14 | Iceland | 7 | 7 | 5 | 4 | 6 | 5 | 6 | 10 | 1 |
| 15 | Greece | 3 | 2 | 3 | 5 | 4 | 2 | 10 | 12 | |
| 16 | Norway | 4 | 3 | 12 | 9 | 2 | 4 | 7 | 11 | |
| 17 | Armenia | 5 | 14 | 7 | 7 | 8 | 10 | 1 | 6 | 5 |

Detailed voting results from Switzerland (Final)
| R/O | Country | Jury | | | | | | | Televote | |
| R/O | Country | Juror 1 | Juror 2 | Juror 3 | Juror 4 | Juror 5 | Rank | Points | Rank | Points |
|---|---|---|---|---|---|---|---|---|---|---|
| 01 | Czech Republic | 11 | 12 | 4 | 22 | 21 | 11 | | 24 | |
| 02 | Romania | 23 | 21 | 15 | 21 | 23 | 24 | | 17 | |
| 03 | Portugal | 21 | 1 | 12 | 1 | 20 | 6 | 5 | 4 | 7 |
| 04 | Finland | 15 | 22 | 19 | 23 | 16 | 21 | | 14 | |
| 05 | Switzerland | | | | | | | | | |
| 06 | France | 20 | 23 | 18 | 20 | 13 | 20 | | 20 | |
| 07 | Norway | 13 | 14 | 6 | 9 | 9 | 10 | 1 | 12 | |
| 08 | Armenia | 8 | 13 | 14 | 10 | 19 | 14 | | 16 | |
| 09 | Italy | 5 | 3 | 7 | 12 | 10 | 9 | 2 | 3 | 8 |
| 10 | Spain | 16 | 7 | 1 | 4 | 3 | 3 | 8 | 5 | 6 |
| 11 | Netherlands | 3 | 4 | 11 | 2 | 4 | 2 | 10 | 13 | |
| 12 | Ukraine | 10 | 6 | 10 | 3 | 5 | 8 | 3 | 2 | 10 |
| 13 | Germany | 18 | 20 | 21 | 15 | 24 | 22 | | 9 | 2 |
| 14 | Lithuania | 17 | 9 | 8 | 13 | 11 | 13 | | 15 | |
| 15 | Azerbaijan | 12 | 15 | 22 | 5 | 12 | 12 | | 22 | |
| 16 | Belgium | 24 | 16 | 17 | 14 | 15 | 19 | | 21 | |
| 17 | Greece | 1 | 2 | 2 | 7 | 7 | 1 | 12 | 19 | |
| 18 | Iceland | 14 | 8 | 13 | 11 | 17 | 15 | | 23 | |
| 19 | Moldova | 22 | 24 | 20 | 24 | 14 | 23 | | 7 | 4 |
| 20 | Sweden | 4 | 11 | 3 | 8 | 2 | 4 | 7 | 8 | 3 |
| 21 | Australia | 2 | 10 | 5 | 18 | 6 | 7 | 4 | 18 | |
| 22 | United Kingdom | 6 | 5 | 9 | 6 | 1 | 5 | 6 | 6 | 5 |
| 23 | Poland | 9 | 19 | 16 | 16 | 18 | 18 | | 10 | 1 |
| 24 | Serbia | 7 | 18 | 24 | 19 | 22 | 16 | | 1 | 12 |
| 25 | Estonia | 19 | 17 | 23 | 17 | 8 | 17 | | 11 | |
