= Georgia in the Eurovision Song Contest 2023 =

- Eurovision Song Contest 2023
- Participating broadcaster: Georgian Public Broadcaster (GPB)
- Country: Georgia
- Selection process: Artist: The Voice Georgia; Song: Internal selection
- Selection date: Artist: 2 February 2023; Song: 16 March 2023

Competing entry
- Song: "Echo"
- Artist: Iru
- Songwriters: Giorgi Kukhianidze; Beni Kadagidze; Irina Khechanovi

Placement
- Semi-final result: Failed to qualify (12th)

Participation chronology

Georgia was represented at the Eurovision Song Contest 2023 with the song "Echo", written by Giorgi Kukhianidze, Beni Kadagidze, and Irina Khechanovi, and performed by Khechanovi herself under her stage name Iru. The Georgian participating broadcaster, the Georgian Public Broadcaster (GPB), selected its representative through the fifth season of The Voice Georgia, while the song "Echo" was internally selected and released on 16 March 2023.

Georgia was drawn to compete in the second semi-final of the Eurovision Song Contest which took place on 11 May 2023. Performing during the show in position 11, "Echo" was not announced among the top 10 entries of the second semi-final and therefore did not qualify to compete in the final. It was later revealed that Georgia placed 12th out of the 16 participating countries in the semi-final with 33 points.

== Background ==
Prior to the 2023 contest, Georgia has participated in the Eurovision Song Contest fourteen times since their first entry in 2007. The nation's highest placing in the contest, to this point, has been ninth place, which was achieved on two occasions: in 2010 with the song "Shine" performed by Sofia Nizharadze and in 2011 with the song "One More Day" performed by Eldrine. The nation briefly withdrew from the contest in 2009 after the European Broadcasting Union (EBU) rejected the Georgian entry, "We Don't Wanna Put In", for perceived political references to Vladimir Putin who was the Russian Prime Minister at the time. The withdrawal and fallout was tied to tense relations between Georgia and then-host country Russia, which stemmed from the 2008 Russo-Georgian War. Georgia has, to this point, failed to qualify to the final on seven occasions.

The Georgian national broadcaster, Georgian Public Broadcaster (GPB), broadcasts the event within Georgia and organises the selection process for the nation's entry. Georgia has selected their entry for the Eurovision Song Contest both through national finals and internal selections in the past. In 2013 and 2014, GPB opted to internally select the Georgian entry, in 2015, the Georgian entry was selected via a national final, and in 2016, the artist was internally selected while the song was chosen in a national final. For their 2017 participation, the entry was selected through a national final. In 2018 the artist was internally selected. In 2019, the entry was fully selected through Georgian Idol, and the show was used again to select the singer the following year. However, after the 2020 contest was cancelled, the broadcaster reverted to an internal selection in 2021, sending the same artist set to take part in 2020. In 2022, another internal selection was made, with the band Circus Mircus and their song "Lock Me In" being chosen to represent Georgia. The entry failed to qualify from the second semi-final, placing 18th with 22 points. For their 2023 participation, the Georgian entry was selected via the reality television show The Voice Georgia.

== Before Eurovision ==
=== The Voice Georgia ===
The Georgian representative for the Eurovision Song Contest 2023 was selected through the fifth season of The Voice Georgia, the Georgian version of the reality television singing competition format The Voice. GPB announced the opening of applications in late August 2022, which would close on in late September. The competition commenced on 8 December 2022 and concluded with a final on 2 February 2023. All shows in the competition were hosted by presenter Gvantsa Daraselia. The live shows were broadcast on 1TV and via online streaming on the broadcaster's website. In the final, the 8 remaining artists performed one after the other, with no eliminations, and the winner was selected exclusively via televote. Iru Khechanovi emerged as the winner of the season and the Georgian representative in the Eurovision Song Contest 2023.

Final – 2 February 2023
R/O	Artist	Song	Televote	Place
1	Tako Kakalashvili	"Stand Up"	10.09%	7
2	Lika Siradze	"Heroes"	13.73%	4
3	Giorgi Datiashvili	"Gethsemane"	15.72%	2
4	Likuna Tutisani	"A Song for You"	13.76%	3
5	Tina Datikashvili	"I Didn't Know My Own Strength"	10.34%	6
6	Kakha Aslamazishvili	"Love You to Death"	2.92%	8
7	Anka Tatarashvili	"7 Rings" / "Thank U, Next"	11.56%	5
8	Iru Khechanovi	"Euphoria"	21.88%	1

=== Song selection ===
Khechanovi's competing song for the contest was internally selected by GPB. Titled "Echo", it was released on 16 March 2023.

== At Eurovision ==
According to Eurovision rules, all nations with the exceptions of the host country and the "Big Five" (France, Germany, Italy, Spain and the United Kingdom) are required to qualify from one of two semi-finals in order to compete for the final; the top ten countries from each semi-final progress to the final. The European Broadcasting Union (EBU) split up the competing countries into six different pots based on voting patterns from previous contests, with countries with favourable voting histories put into the same pot. On 31 January 2023, an allocation draw was held, which placed each country into one of the two semi-finals, and determined which half of the show they would perform in. Georgia has been placed into the second semi-final, to be held on 11 May 2023, and has been scheduled to perform in the second half of the show.

Once all the competing songs for the 2023 contest had been released, the running order for the semi-finals was decided by the shows' producers rather than through another draw, so that similar songs were not placed next to each other. Georgia was set to perform in position 11, following the entry from Slovenia and before the entry from San Marino.

At the end of the show, Georgia was not among the ten countries announced as qualifiers for the final. This was the sixth consecutive time that Georgia failed to advance from the semi-finals.

=== Voting ===
==== Points awarded to Georgia ====
Points awarded to Georgia (Semi-final)
Score	Televote
12 points	Armenia
10 points	
8 points	
7 points	Greece
6 points	
5 points	
4 points	
3 points	Lithuania; San Marino (Note: San Marino uses a jury in the semi-finals.)
2 points	Romania; Ukraine
1 point	Australia; Estonia; Poland; Rest of the World

==== Points awarded by Georgia ====
Points awarded by Georgia (Semi-final)
Score	Televote
12 points	Armenia
10 points	Lithuania
8 points	Poland
7 points	Australia
6 points	Iceland
5 points	Cyprus
4 points	Austria
3 points	Belgium
2 points	Estonia
1 point	Slovenia

Points awarded by Georgia (Final)
Score	Televote	Jury
12 points	Armenia	Belgium
10 points	Ukraine	Armenia
8 points	Finland	Italy
7 points	Sweden	Israel
6 points	Israel	Lithuania
5 points	Italy	Estonia
4 points	Lithuania	Sweden
3 points	Moldova	Cyprus
2 points	Norway	Australia
1 point	Croatia	Finland

==== Detailed voting results ====
The following members comprised the Georgian jury:

- David Tsintsadze
- Giorgi Toradze
- Anri Jokhadze
- Lana Kutateladze
- Sophiko Khalvashi

Detailed voting results from Georgia (Semi-final 2)
R/O	Country	Televote	
R/O	Country	Rank	Points
01	Denmark	15	
02	Armenia	1	12
03	Romania	14	
04	Estonia	9	2
05	Belgium	8	3
06	Cyprus	6	5
07	Iceland	5	6
08	Greece	11	
09	Poland	3	8
10	Slovenia	10	1
11	Georgia		
12	San Marino	12	
13	Austria	7	4
14	Albania	13	
15	Lithuania	2	10
16	Australia	4	7

Detailed voting results from Georgia (Final)
R/O	Country	Jury							Televote	
R/O	Country	Juror 1	Juror 2	Juror 3	Juror 4	Juror 5	Rank	Points	Rank	Points
01	Austria	25	24	23	7	19	16		14	
02	Portugal	26	23	22	21	20	25		24	
03	Switzerland	12	21	19	20	18	20		25	
04	Poland	24	22	24	19	24	26		19	
05	Serbia	22	14	20	25	17	22		20	
06	France	13	9	18	15	16	13		12	
07	Cyprus	8	5	6	10	10	8	3	18	
08	Spain	16	16	15	17	13	18		15	
09	Sweden	4	3	7	16	14	7	4	4	7
10	Albania	23	25	21	12	26	23		26	
11	Italy	9	1	8	3	5	3	8	6	5
12	Estonia	3	10	4	6	9	6	5	22	
13	Finland	15	12	5	8	12	10	1	3	8
14	Czech Republic	18	13	14	24	15	19		11	
15	Australia	6	6	9	23	11	9	2	17	
16	Belgium	2	2	1	2	1	1	12	21	
17	Armenia	1	4	2	1	3	2	10	1	12
18	Moldova	17	19	12	9	21	15		8	3
19	Ukraine	11	7	11	11	8	11		2	10
20	Norway	10	18	17	13	22	17		9	2
21	Germany	21	20	25	14	25	24		16	
22	Lithuania	5	11	10	4	2	5	6	7	4
23	Israel	7	8	3	5	4	4	7	5	6
24	Slovenia	20	26	16	18	7	14		13	
25	Croatia	14	15	26	26	6	12		10	1
26	United Kingdom	19	17	13	22	23	21		23	
