= Greece in the Eurovision Song Contest 2023 =

- Eurovision Song Contest 2023
- Participating broadcaster: Hellenic Broadcasting Corporation (ERT)
- Country: Greece
- Selection process: Internal selection
- Announcement date: Artist: 30 January 2023; Song: 12 March 2023

Competing entry
- Song: "What They Say"
- Artist: Victor Vernicos
- Songwriters: Victor Vernicos Jørgensen

Placement
- Semi-final result: Failed to qualify (13th)

Participation chronology

Greece was represented at the Eurovision Song Contest 2023 with the song "What They Say" written and performed by Victor Vernicos. The Greek participating broadcaster, the Hellenic Broadcasting Corporation (ERT), internally selected its entry for the contest. Vernicos was announced as the artist on 30 January 2023, while the song was presented to the public on 12 March. The entry selection process was subject to a legal challenge by second-place candidate Melissa Mantzoukis; however, Vernicos' participation was ultimately allowed to continue.

To promote "What They Say" as the Greek entry, a music video for the song was created as well as an acoustic version. Vernicos subsequently attended a meet-and-greet and gave interviews to foreign press. Greece was drawn to compete in the second semi-final of the Eurovision Song Contest which took place on 11 May 2023. Performing during the show in position eight, "What They Say" placed 13th in the semi-final with 14 points, failing to qualify for the contest's final. This marked Greece's third non-qualification and also its worst result to this point in terms of points received in a semi-final.

== Background ==
Prior to the 2023 contest, Greece had participated in the Eurovision Song Contest 42 times since its debut in 1974. To this point, they won the contest once, in 2005 with the song "My Number One" performed by Helena Paparizou. Following the introduction of semi-finals for the 2004 contest, Greece managed to qualify for the final with each of their entries for several years. Between 2004 and 2013, the nation achieved nine top ten placements in the final. The first entry to not qualify for the final was "Utopian Land" by Argo in 2016. Its 16th place finish marked Greece's worst placing at the contest and led to its absence from the final for the first time since 2000, when they did not send an entry. In 2018, Greece failed to qualify for the second time with "Oniro mou" by Yianna Terzi finishing 14th in the semi-final. For the three contests prior to 2023, the nation once again returned to qualifying for the final, including in 2022, when "Die Together" by Amanda Tenfjord went on to place eighth with 215 points.

As part of its duties as participating broadcaster, the Hellenic Broadcasting Corporation (ERT) organises the selection of its entry in the Eurovision Song Contest and broadcasts the event in the country. ERT's predecessor, the National Radio Television Foundation (EIRT), debuted in the contest in 1974 and then ERT participated from 1975 until 2013, when the broadcaster was shut down by a government directive and replaced firstly with the interim Dimosia Tileorasi (DT) and then later by the New Hellenic Radio, Internet and Television (NERIT) broadcaster. Following the victory of the Syriza party at the January 2015 Greek legislative election, the Hellenic Parliament renamed NERIT to ERT that June. ERT confirmed its intentions to participate in the 2023 contest on 26 August 2022 when the announced details of their upcoming selection process for its entry.

== Before Eurovision ==
=== Internal selection ===
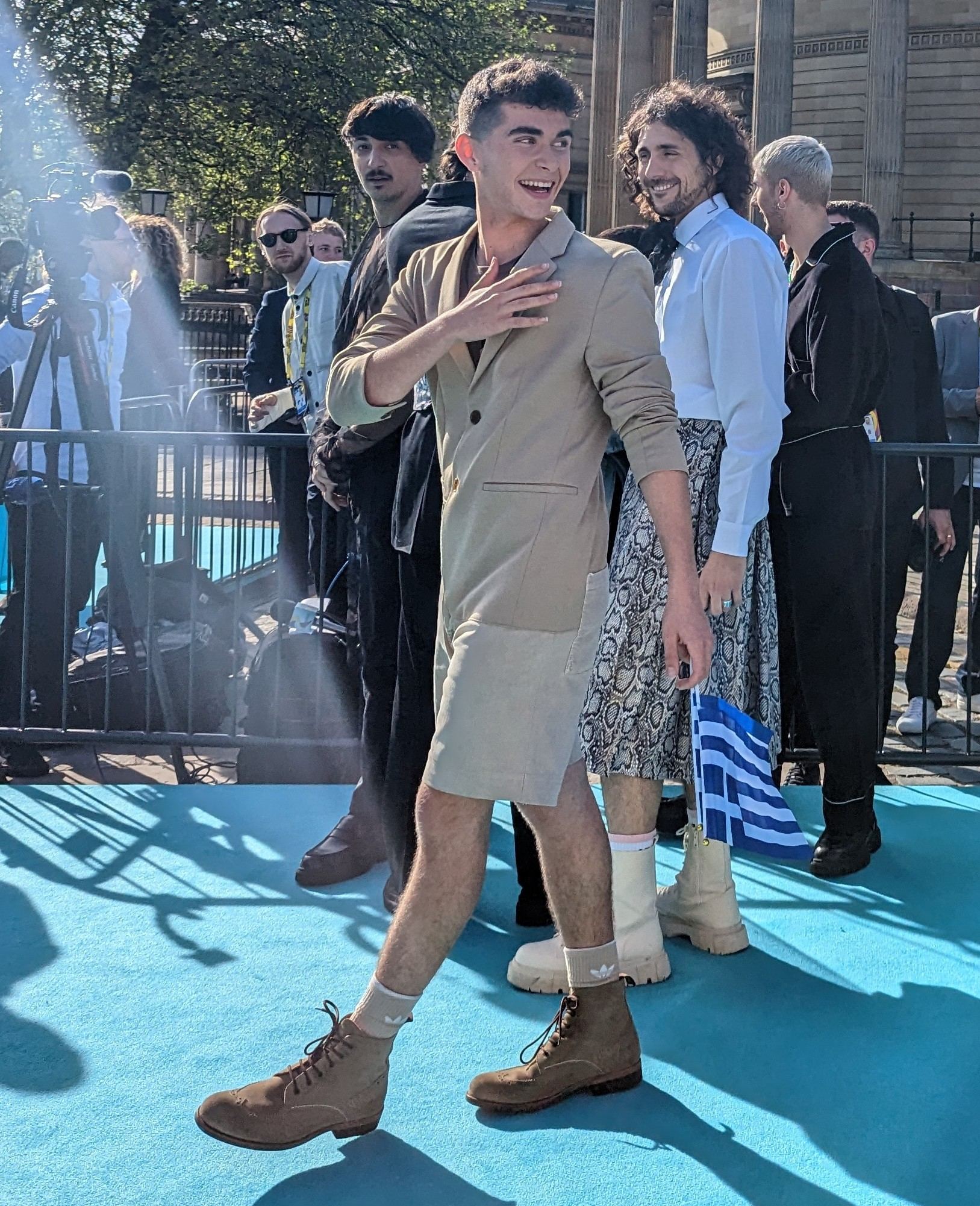
Victor Vernicos was selected internally by the Hellenic Broadcasting Corporation to represent Greece in the Eurovision Song Contest 2023.

On 26 August 2022, ERT opened a submission period where artists and composers were able to submit their proposals for consideration by the broadcaster until 9 October 2022. Artists were required to be signed to record labels and their proposal had to contain up to three songs, indicate the accompanying artistic group, and include ideas or concepts for the song's promotion and presentation. There were 106 songs received by the submission deadline. Seven entries were then shortlisted by a 70-member committee and were announced on 28 December 2022.

The seven acts were then evaluated by public and artistic committees. The public committee consisted of a total of 70 members randomly selected from 2,982 applications based on five age groups: 25 members in the 18 to 24 category, 20 members in the 25 to 34 category, 15 members in the 35 to 44 category and 10 members in the over 45 category. The artistic committee consisted of Petros Adam (music producer), Leonidas Antonopoulos (journalist and music producer), Fotis Apergis (ERT radio director), Konstantinos Bourounis (head of ERT's youth program), Maria Kozakou (director of the Second Programme of Hellenic Radio), Dimitris Papadimitriou (music composer) and Yannis Petridis (music producer). On 19 January 2023, ERT shortlisted three final songs from the seven, which was the outcome of the public committee vote, followed by a respective evaluation by the artistic committee. The final three were announced through ERT1 show, Proian se eidon tin mesimvrian (Greek: Πρωίαν σε είδον την μεσημβρίαν; I saw you in the morning, at noon).

The combination of votes from the public committee (50.6%) and the artistic committee (49.4%) then selected the Greek entry. This marked the first time that ERT had opted for a format where the entry was selected by two panels. Greek-Danish singer Victor Vernicos was announced as the Greek representative for the 2023 contest through ERT1's newscast on 30 January 2023. At 16 years-old, he became the youngest entrant to be selected to represent the nation. Vernicos' entry, "What They Say", was released on 12 March 2023 through Panik Records alongside its music video.

Shortlisted artists and songs in the first round
Artist	Song	Songwriter(s)
Antonia Kaouri and Maria Maragkou	"Shout Out!"	Unknown
Klavdia	"Holy Water"	Arcade, Pantelis Loupasakis
Konstantina Iosifidou	"We're Young"	Konstantina Iosifidou
Leon of Athens	"Somewhere to Go"	Timoleon Veremis, David Sneddon, Katerine Duska
Melissa Mantzoukis	"Liar"	Dimitris Kontopoulos, Elke Tiel
Monika	"Proud"	Monika Christodoulou, Stavros Xenides
Victor Vernicos	"What They Say"	Victor Vernicos Jørgensen

Shortlisted artists and songs in the second round
Artist	Song	Artistic committee	Public committee	Total	Place
Antonia Kaouri and Maria Maragkou	"Shout Out!"	720	341	1,061	3
Melissa Mantzoukis	"Liar"	440	693	1,133	2
Victor Vernicos	"What They Say"	740	509	1,249	1

=== Reception and legal challenge ===
Following the announcement of Vernicos as the Greek entrant, Mantzoukis publicly protested the results of the process, threatening legal action. Mantzoukis and her legal team cited two concerns in their challenge of the results. Prior to the artistic committee's vote, it was reported that Kaouri and Maragkou had withdrawn themselves from consideration, leaving only two entrants as options. Despite this, all three acts were awarded points by the committee. Secondly, they alleged that even if all three acts were considered, the point values awarded do not sum to the quantity of points available, and if they had, Mantzoukis would have won. Artistic committee member Kozakou then explained in an interview on ERT's Proian se eidon tin mesimvrian that point values were not awarded based on awards of first, second and third place by the committee (12, 10 or 8 points, respectively, in Eurovision fashion), but from 12 through 4 points (first through seventh) to align the total point values with the quantity awarded by the public committee. Mantzoukis' lawyer Christos Zotiadis responded during an interview on Star Channel's show Breakfast @ Star that they were unsatisfied with ERT's response, and requested that the detailed committee votes for each member at each voting stage be released for transparency.

A temporary injunction halting the Greek participation was denied by Greek courts on 6 March, citing the short time period between then and the EBU's 13 March deadline for entry submissions. Mantzoukis' lawsuit to be declared the winner and awarded damages was anticipated to be heard in mid-May following the contest. Arguments in the lawsuit ended on 4 July, with the judge expected to make a decision within six to seven months of that date. Mantzoukis' song, "Liar", ended up representing Cyprus in the Eurovision Song Contest 2024, sung by Silia Kapsis.

=== Promotion ===
To promote the entry, a music video of the song, directed by Yiannis Georgioudakis, was filmed. The video was produced by PickCodes, with Kostas Kalimeris, Steve Sovolos, and Vangelis Gialamas taking part in its production. It was scheduled to be released on 6 March alongside the song itself, but was delayed due to the Tempi train crash. The song and video were eventually released on 12 March during the show Dio sti 1 (Greek: Δύο στη 1; Two in 1) and were available later that day through ERT's over-the-top media service ERTFlix and on the ERT's YouTube channel. To further promote the entry, Vernicos took part in a meet-and-greet event on 6 April organised by ERT. The event was attended by the Greek Eurovision delegation, local British embassy representatives, as well as mainstream print, television and radio media. He sang his entry "What They Say" live with a guitar and covered a number of past Eurovision entries. Further promotion involved an acoustic version of the song being released on the official Eurovision YouTube channel as part of its A Little Bit More series. Vernicos was largely absent from the Eurovision touring circuit and did not attend pre-parties, although he made several appearances and performed at The Cavern Club and the EuroClub in Camp and Furnace upon his arrival in Liverpool.

== At Eurovision ==
The Eurovision Song Contest 2023 took place at the Liverpool Arena in Liverpool, United Kingdom, and consisted of two semi-finals held on the respective dates of 9 and 11 May and the final on 13 May 2023. According to Eurovision rules, all nations with the exceptions of the host country and the "Big Five" (France, Germany, Italy, Spain and the United Kingdom) are required to qualify from one of two semi-finals in order to compete for the final; the top 10 countries from each semi-final progress to the final. The European Broadcasting Union (EBU) split up the competing countries into six different pots based on voting patterns from previous contests, with countries with favourable voting histories put into the same pot. On 31 January 2023, an allocation draw was held, which placed each country into one of the two semi-finals, and determined which half of the show they would perform in. Greece was placed into the second semi-final, to be held on 11 May 2023, and was scheduled to perform in the first half of the show. Once all the competing entries for the 2023 contest had been released, the running order for the semi-finals was decided by the producers of the contest to prevent similar songs from being placed next to each other. Greece was set to perform in position eight, following the entry from the Iceland and before the entry from Poland.

In Greece, all shows were televised on ERT1 with commentary by Maria Kozakou and Jenny Melita. A radio broadcast on Deftero Programma included the commentary by Kozakou and Melita, with Dimitris Meidanis covering the commercial breaks with interviews and contest history.

=== Performances ===
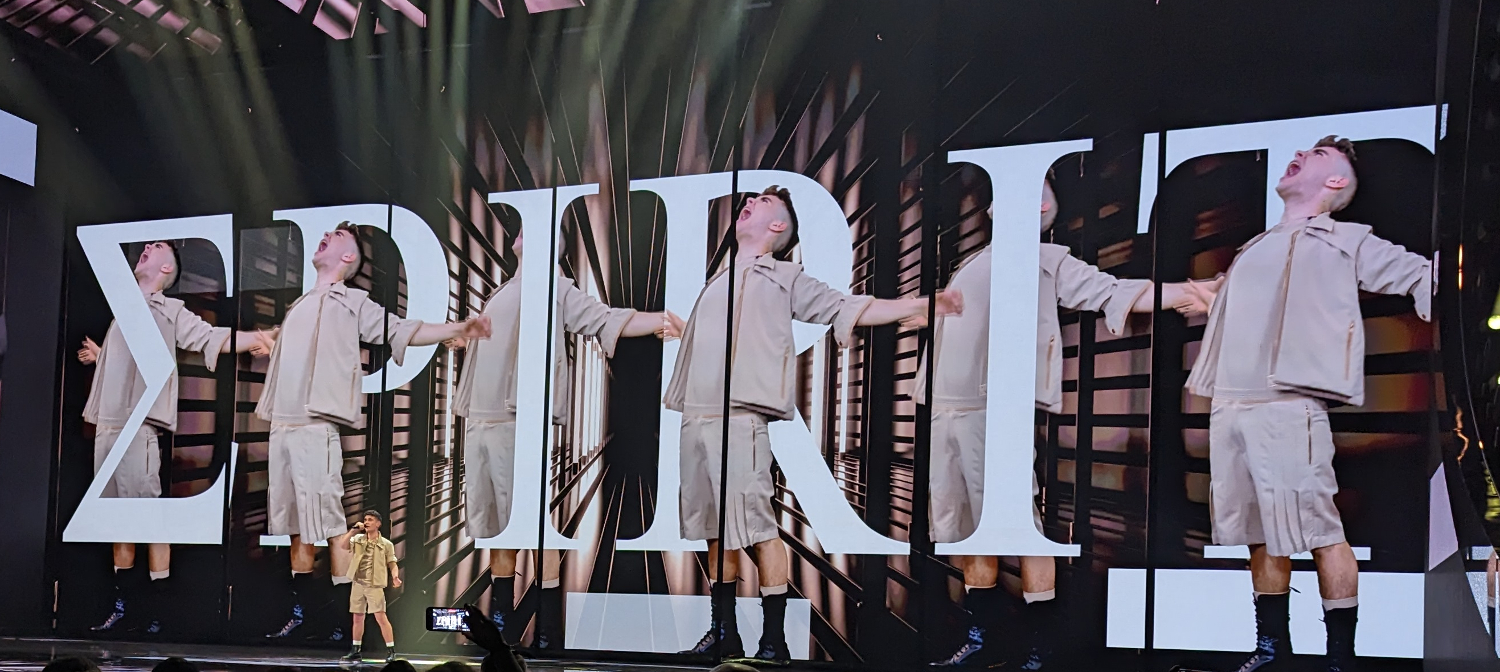
Vernicos performing "What They Say" during a dress rehearsal for the second semi-final.

Prior to leaving for the contest, Vernicos took part in rehearsals daily at ERT's studios in Athens in late April. This was followed by technical rehearsals in Liverpool on 2 and 5 May, and dress rehearsals on 10 May. The latter included the jury show where the professional back-up juries of each country watched and voted in a result used if any issues with public televoting occurred.

The stage presence for "What They Say" was organised by Konstantinos Rigos who served as artistic director for the entry. Rigos had previously directed the Greek entries in 2011 and 2012. The performance consisted of Vernicos being alone on stage with no backing dancers or vocalists. He wore a beige-coloured shorts-suit by costume designer George Segredakis, and was surrounded by a video wall showing rainfall, a large-scale video of himself, as well as lyrics of the song in English and the Greek alphabet. Rigos described the inspiration for the stage presence as "Greek summer".

At the end of the second semi-final, Greece was not among the ten countries announced as qualifiers for the final. It was later revealed that Greece placed 13th in the semi-final, receiving a total of 14 points. This marked Greece's third non-qualification to the final and also its worst result to this point in terms of points received in a semi-final.

=== Voting ===
Below is a breakdown of points awarded to Greece in the second semi-final as well as by Greece in the second semi-final and final of the contest. Also included is the breakdown of the jury voting and televoting conducted during the two shows. Voting during the shows involved each country awarding sets of points from 1-8, 10 and 12: one from their professional jury and the other from televoting in the final vote, while the semi-final vote was based entirely on the vote of the public. Each nation's jury consisted of five music industry professionals who are citizens of the country they represent. This jury judged each entry based on: vocal capacity; the stage performance; the song's composition and originality; and the overall impression by the act. The exact composition of the professional jury, and the results of each country's jury and televoting were released after the final; the individual results from each jury member were released in an anonymised form. The Greek jury consisted of Christos Giakoumopoulos, Fotios Giannoutsos, Nikolaos Nikolakopoulos, Claudia Matola, and Evanthia Theotokatou.

In the second semi-final, Greece finished in 13th place out of 16 entries and received 14 points total from two countries: the top 12 points from Cyprus and two points from Armenia. Over the course of the contest, Greece awarded its 12 points to Cyprus in the second semi-final and to Belgium (jury) and Cyprus (televote) in the final. The Greek spokesperson, who announced the top 12-point score awarded by the Greek jury during the final, was Fotis Sergoulopoulos.

==== Points awarded to Greece ====
Points awarded to Greece (Semi-final 2)
Score	Televote
12 points	Cyprus
10 points	
8 points	
7 points	
6 points	
5 points	
4 points	
3 points	
2 points	Armenia
1 point	

==== Points awarded by Greece ====
Points awarded by Greece (Semi-final 2)
Score	Televote
12 points	Cyprus
10 points	Albania
8 points	Armenia
7 points	Georgia
6 points	Austria
5 points	Poland
4 points	Australia
3 points	Estonia
2 points	Slovenia
1 point	Belgium

Points awarded by Greece (Final)
Score	Televote	Jury
12 points	Cyprus	Belgium
10 points	Finland	Portugal
8 points	Sweden	Israel
7 points	Israel	Austria
6 points	Norway	Sweden
5 points	Italy	Australia
4 points	Albania	Cyprus
3 points	France	Albania
2 points	Armenia	Switzerland
1 point	Czech Republic	Serbia

==== Detailed voting results ====
The following members comprised the Greek jury:

- Christos Giakoumopoulos
- Fotios Giannoutsos
- Nikolaos Nikolakopoulos
- Claudia Matola
- Evanthia Theotokatou

Detailed voting results from Greece (Semi-final 2)
R/O	Country	Televote	
R/O	Country	Rank	Points
01	Denmark	13	
02	Armenia	3	8
03	Romania	14	
04	Estonia	8	3
05	Belgium	10	1
06	Cyprus	1	12
07	Iceland	12	
08	Greece		
09	Poland	6	5
10	Slovenia	9	2
11	Georgia	4	7
12	San Marino	15	
13	Austria	5	6
14	Albania	2	10
15	Lithuania	11	
16	Australia	7	4

Detailed voting results from Greece (Final)
R/O	Country	Jury							Televote	
R/O	Country	Juror 1	Juror 2	Juror 3	Juror 4	Juror 5	Rank	Points	Rank	Points
01	Austria	23	3	2	5	3	4	7	15	
02	Portugal	4	11	1	2	2	2	10	25	
03	Switzerland	1	15	13	10	25	9	2	20	
04	Poland	9	23	8	7	20	11		11	
05	Serbia	2	22	22	8	12	10	1	19	
06	France	11	21	19	17	9	17		8	3
07	Cyprus	7	18	6	4	8	7	4	1	12
08	Spain	6	19	21	16	21	15		21	
09	Sweden	16	2	10	9	4	5	6	3	8
10	Albania	17	7	4	6	16	8	3	7	4
11	Italy	13	14	17	18	17	21		6	5
12	Estonia	22	9	7	13	13	13		22	
13	Finland	15	26	25	26	7	20		2	10
14	Czech Republic	8	17	15	11	19	14		10	1
15	Australia	5	4	9	20	6	6	5	23	
16	Belgium	3	5	3	3	1	1	12	17	
17	Armenia	12	6	11	15	18	12		9	2
18	Moldova	18	12	24	25	24	25		12	
19	Ukraine	14	16	12	19	10	16		14	
20	Norway	20	8	18	21	15	19		5	6
21	Germany	21	13	20	14	23	24		16	
22	Lithuania	19	20	16	12	22	23		26	
23	Israel	24	1	5	1	5	3	8	4	7
24	Slovenia	10	24	23	24	14	22		13	
25	Croatia	25	25	26	23	26	26		24	
26	United Kingdom	26	10	14	22	11	18		18	

== After Eurovision ==
=== Reception ===
Greece's failure to qualify to the final led to media outlets once again citing Mantzoukis' lack of selection as a problem. As reported in TVNea, foreign press preferred Mantzoukis' entry "Liar" over Vernicos' from the beginning, and saw it as a contender for high placement at the contest. Giorgos Liagas, presenter of the show To Proino on ANT1, expressed that ERT had mocked the Greek people by including them in the selection process, but not sending their preferred candidate to represent them at the contest. Appearing on the Alpha TV show Super Katerina on 12 May, the day after the second semi-final, lyricist Evi Droutsa opined that the song lacked a melody, that Vernicos was too young to compete at this level, and that his selection centered too much on his last name and family. ERT released a statement following the non-qualification, reinforcing the integrity of the selection process and explaining that Vernicos met the demands of the contest and deserved applause. The artist himself posted on social media shortly after saying "I love you guys. Many more to come soon. Thank you to all Eurovision fans for the amazing experience".
