= Amanda Tenfjord =

Greek-Norwegian singer and songwriter (born 1997)

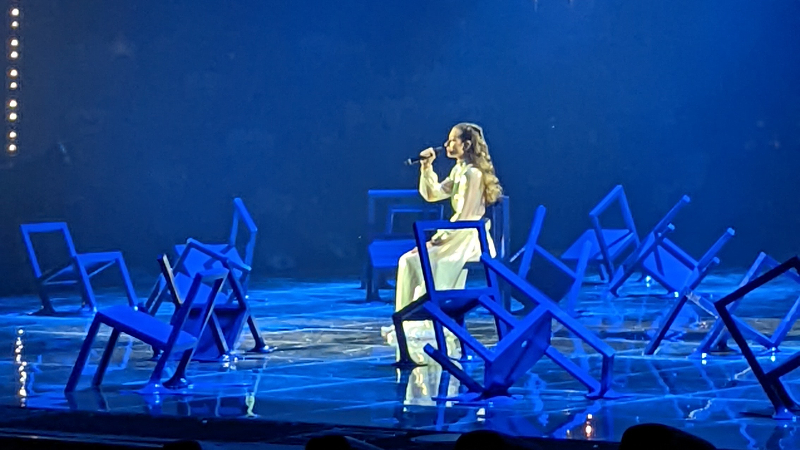
- Tenfjord at the Eurovision Song Contest 2022

Background information
- Also known as: Amanda Georgiadi
- Born: Amanda Klara Georgiadis Tenfjord; 9 January 1997 (age 29)
- Origin: Tennfjord, Norway
- Genres: Synth-pop; Indie pop; Nordic pop
- Instruments: Vocals; piano
- Years active: 2014–present
- Label: Propeller Recordings
- Website: www.amandatenfjord.no

Amanda Klara Georgiadis Tenfjord (Note: Norwegian pronunciation: [ˈtɛnːfjuːr]) (Greek: Αμάντα Γεωργιάδη, romanized: Amánta Georgiádi; (Note: Greek pronunciation: [aˈmanda ʝeorʝiˈaði]) born 9 January 1997) is a Greek-Norwegian singer, songwriter and medical doctor. She represented Greece in the Eurovision Song Contest 2022 with the song "Die Together".

== Early life and education ==
Tenfjord was born on 9 January 1997 to a Norwegian mother and a Greek father. According to her own statements, she was born in Ioannina, Greece, but this is contradicted by a birth announcement in Sunnmørsposten which states that she was born in the Central Hospital of Møre og Romsdal in Ålesund, Norway. She was baptised in Vatne in October 1998.

Tenfjord lived her first years in Ioannina, before she and her family moved to Tennfjord in Norway. She attended Fagerlia videregående skole in Ålesund (at the same time as another singer, Sigrid). In 2015, she moved to Trondheim to study medicine at the Norwegian University of Science and Technology. In 2019, she announced that she had put her studies on hold to focus on her musical career.

== Career ==
Tenfjord started taking piano lessons at the age of five. Tenfjord's song "Run" won the Music Prize in 2015 and appeared in an advertising video for Personskadeforbundet LTN in 2014. In 2016, she participated in the music competition The Stream on TV 2, where she was placed among the top 30 participants. In 2019, she appeared in a programme on NRK P3 with the song "Let Me Think", and performed at the music festival Trondheim Calling. Tenfjord has also toured with the Norwegian band Highasakite. Tenfjord was awarded the Haram Municipality Youth Culture Prize in 2019. On 15 December 2021, she was announced as the Greek representative for the Eurovision Song Contest 2022 where she finished eighth out of twenty-five.

Tenfjord was the opening act for Madrugada in September 2022 at the Panathenaic Stadium in Athens. Tenfjord received a prize of honour from the governor of Epirus and the mayor of Ioannina for her contribution to Greece in the Eurovision Song Contest 2022. On 21 October 2022, she released her debut album In Hindsight, featuring thirteen songs.

== Discography ==
=== Studio albums ===
- In Hindsight (2022)

=== Extended plays ===
- First Impression (2018)
- Miss the Way You Missed Me (2021)

=== Singles ===
- "Run" (2014)
- "I Need Lions" (2016)
- "Man of Iron" (2017)
- "First Impression" (2018)
- "No Thanks" (2018)
- "Let Me Think" (2018)
- "Pick a Card" (2018)
- "The Floor Is Lava" (2019)
- "Troubled Water" (2019)
- "Kill the Lonely" (2019)
- "As If" (2020)
- "Pressure" (2020)
- "Then I Fell in Love" (2020)
- "Miss the Way You Missed Me" (2021)
- "Promises" (2021)
- "Die Together" (2022)
- "Plans" (2022)
- "All In" (2022)
- "Aman" (feat. Evangelia) (2022)
- "I'll Stay" (2022)

== Notes ==
Awards and achievements
| Preceded by Stefania with "Last Dance" | Greece in the Eurovision Song Contest; 2022 | Succeeded by Victor Vernicos with "What They Say" |
