= Echo (Iru song) =

2023 song by Iru

Single by Iru
- Language: English
- Released: 16 March 2023
- Length: 3:02
- Label: Giga Studio Production
- Composers: Giorgi Kukhianidze; Beni Kadagidze; Iru Khechanovi

Iru singles chronology
"Idea" (2023)	"Echo" (2023)

Music video
- "Echo" on YouTube

Eurovision Song Contest 2023 entry
- Country: Georgia
- Artist: Iru
- Composer: Giorgi Kukhianidze
- Lyricists: Beni Kadagidze; Iru Khechanovi

Finals performance
- Semi-final result: 12th
- Semi-final points: 33

Entry chronology
- ◄ "Lock Me In" (2022)
- "Firefighter" (2024) ►

Official performance video
- "Echo" (Second Semi-Final) on YouTube

"Echo" is a song by Georgian singer Iru Khechanovi, released on 16 March 2023. The song represented Georgia in the Eurovision Song Contest 2023 after Khechanovi won the fifth season of The Voice Georgia, Georgia's national selection to choose their artist for that year's Eurovision Song Contest. Competing in the second semi-final in that year's Eurovision Song Contest, the song failed to qualify for the grand final, finishing in 12th with 33 points.

== Background and composition ==
In interviews, Iru reported that "Echo" took three to four days to write, and two to three weeks in order to complete the production for the song's release. The song was written immediately after Iru's victory in The Voice Georgia, leaving Iru "emotionally drained".

The song is reported as a song that describes one's process of trying to find love. In multiple interviews, Iru would compare the song's beginning as to when one is without love, saying that the person is lost. Then, with a self-described "bomb of love" that fills up the person with the emotion of love, the person becomes a completely different person.

== Eurovision Song Contest ==
=== The Voice Georgia ===
The Georgian representative for the Eurovision Song Contest 2023 was selected through the fifth season of The Voice Georgia, the Georgian version of the reality television singing competition format The Voice. The competition commenced on 8 December 2022 and concluded with a final on 2 February 2023.

In the final of the show, eight artists would compete, with Iru being drawn to perform last. Singing Loreen's "Euphoria", she would emerge victorious with a total of 21.88% of the televote. With the victory, she was selected to represent Georgia in the Eurovision Song Contest 2023. "Echo", however, was internally selected by Georgian Public Broadcasting (GPB) after Khechanovi had won the competition, and was announced to release on 16 March by GPB.

=== At Eurovision ===
According to Eurovision rules, all nations with the exceptions of the host country and the "Big Five" (France, Germany, Italy, Spain and the United Kingdom) are required to qualify from one of two semi-finals in order to compete for the final; the top ten countries from each semi-final progress to the final. The European Broadcasting Union (EBU) split up the competing countries into six different pots based on voting patterns from previous contests, with countries with favourable voting histories put into the same pot. On 31 January 2023, an allocation draw was held, which placed each country into one of the two semi-finals, and determined which half of the show they would perform in. Georgia was placed into the second semi-final, which was held on 11 May 2023, performed in the second half of the show.

Iru's Eurovision performance featured Iru wearing a white dress and Iru making "psychotic moments" with her face, which according to Iru was to display numerous traits, including love, passion, and sass. In the second semi-final, "Echo" would garner a 12th place finish with 33 points, failing to qualify for the grand final.
