= Victor Vernicos =

Greek singer and songwriter (born 2006)

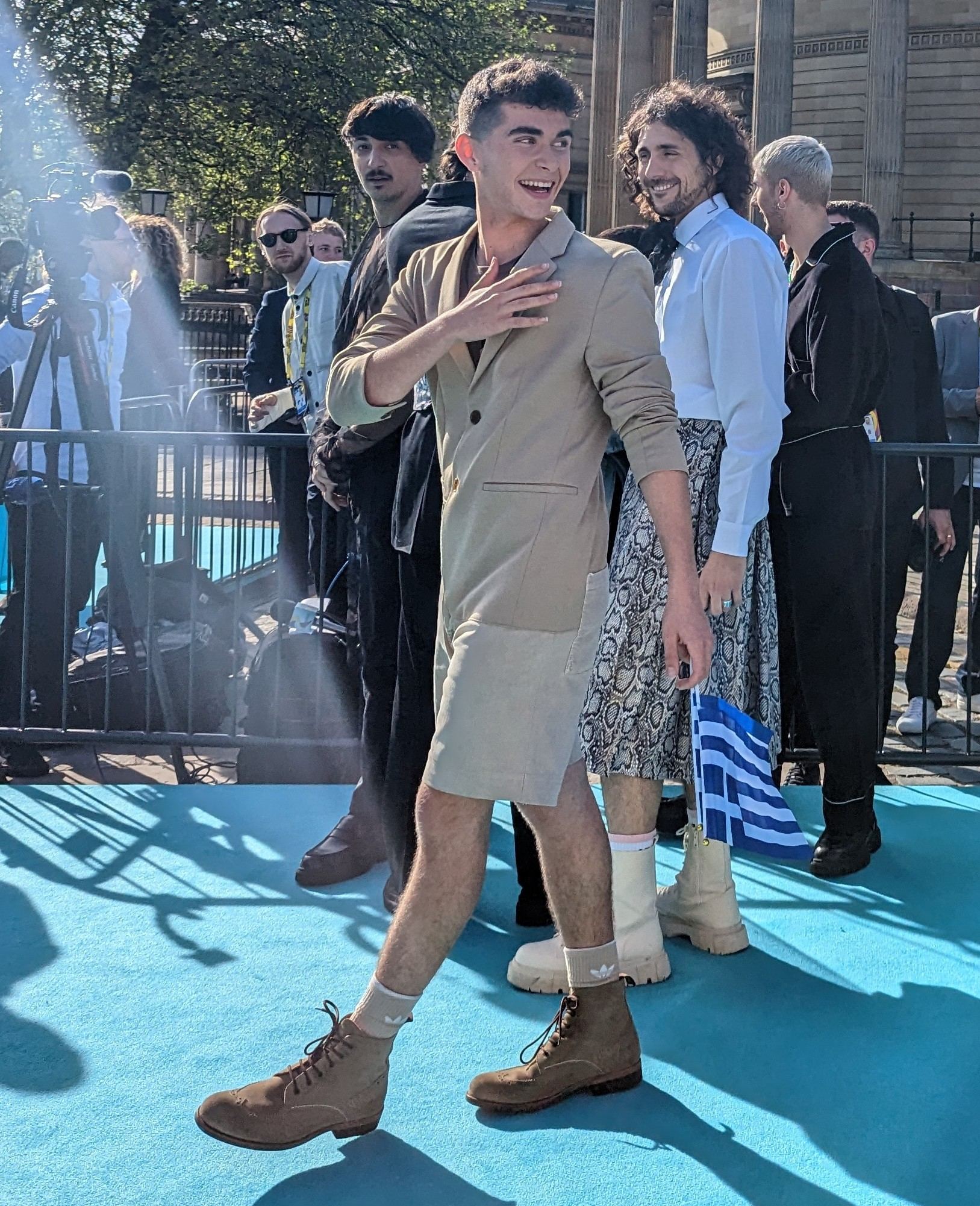
- Vernicos in 2023

Background information
- Born: Victor Vernicos Jørgensen; 23 October 2006 (age 19); Athens, Greece
- Genres: Pop
- Occupations: Singer; songwriter
- Instruments: Vocals; guitar
- Years active: 2020–present
- Label: Panik Records

Victor Vernicos Jørgensen (Greek: Βίκτωρ Βερνίκος Γιούργκενσεν; born 23 October 2006) is a Greek singer and songwriter. He represented Greece in the Eurovision Song Contest 2023 with the song "What They Say".

== Early life and career ==
Victor Vernicos was born in October 2006 in Athens to a Danish father (businessman Lars Juul Jørgensen) and a Greek mother (Marina Vernicou). He started piano lessons at the age of four, singing lessons at eight, and guitar lessons at ten. He started writing his own songs at the age of eleven, and has been producing his own music since 2021. In 2021, Vernicos first released a song that was written and produced entirely by himself. He has described Ed Sheeran as an influence of his.

In 2022, Vernicos announced that he had submitted a song to the Greek public broadcaster ERT to be considered as a possible entry for the Eurovision Song Contest 2023. On 28 December 2022, it was revealed that his entry "What They Say" was among the seven shortlisted acts. Vernicos wrote the song at the age of 14. He subsequently advanced to the final three candidates.

On 30 January 2023, it was announced by ERT that Vernicos had been selected to represent Greece in the Eurovision Song Contest 2023. He is the youngest artist to have represented Greece in the Eurovision Song Contest, as well as the youngest artist in the 2023 contest. He performed in the second semi-final, but did not qualify for the grand final, finishing 13th out of 16 with 14 points.

== Personal life ==
Through his maternal side, Victor is connected to the wealthy and influential Vernicos business family from Greece.

== Discography ==
=== Extended plays ===
- Waterfall (2024)

=== Singles ===
- 2020 – "Apart"
- 2021 – "Fake Club"
- 2021 – "Hope It's in Heaven"
- 2022 – "Youthful Eyes"
- 2022 – "Mean To"
- 2022 – "Out of This World"
- 2022 – "Brutally Honest with You"
- 2023 – "What They Say"
- 2023 – "The 968 Paradox"
- 2024 – "Fading"
- 2024 – "Enemy Lines"
- 2024 - "1s2s3s4s"
- 2024 - "Toothache"
- 2025 – "Go Away"
- 2025 – "As Long As I Win"
- 2025 – "Where'd You Smell the Smoke Love?"

Awards and achievements
Preceded by Amanda Georgiadi Tenfjord with "Die Together"	Greece in the Eurovision Song Contest; 2023	Succeeded by Marina Satti with "Zari"
