= Eidsvik =

Eidsvik may refer to:

== Places ==
- Eidsvik, Vestland, a village in Kvinnherad municipality, Vestland county, Norway
- Eidsvik, Møre og Romsdal, a village in Ålesund municipality, Møre og Romsdal county, Norway

== Other ==
- Eidsvik Skipsbyggeri, a small shipyard in Kvinnherad municipality, Vestland county, Norway
