= Iru Khechanovi =

Georgian singer and songwriter (born 2000)

Iru Khechanovi ირუ ხეჩანოვი
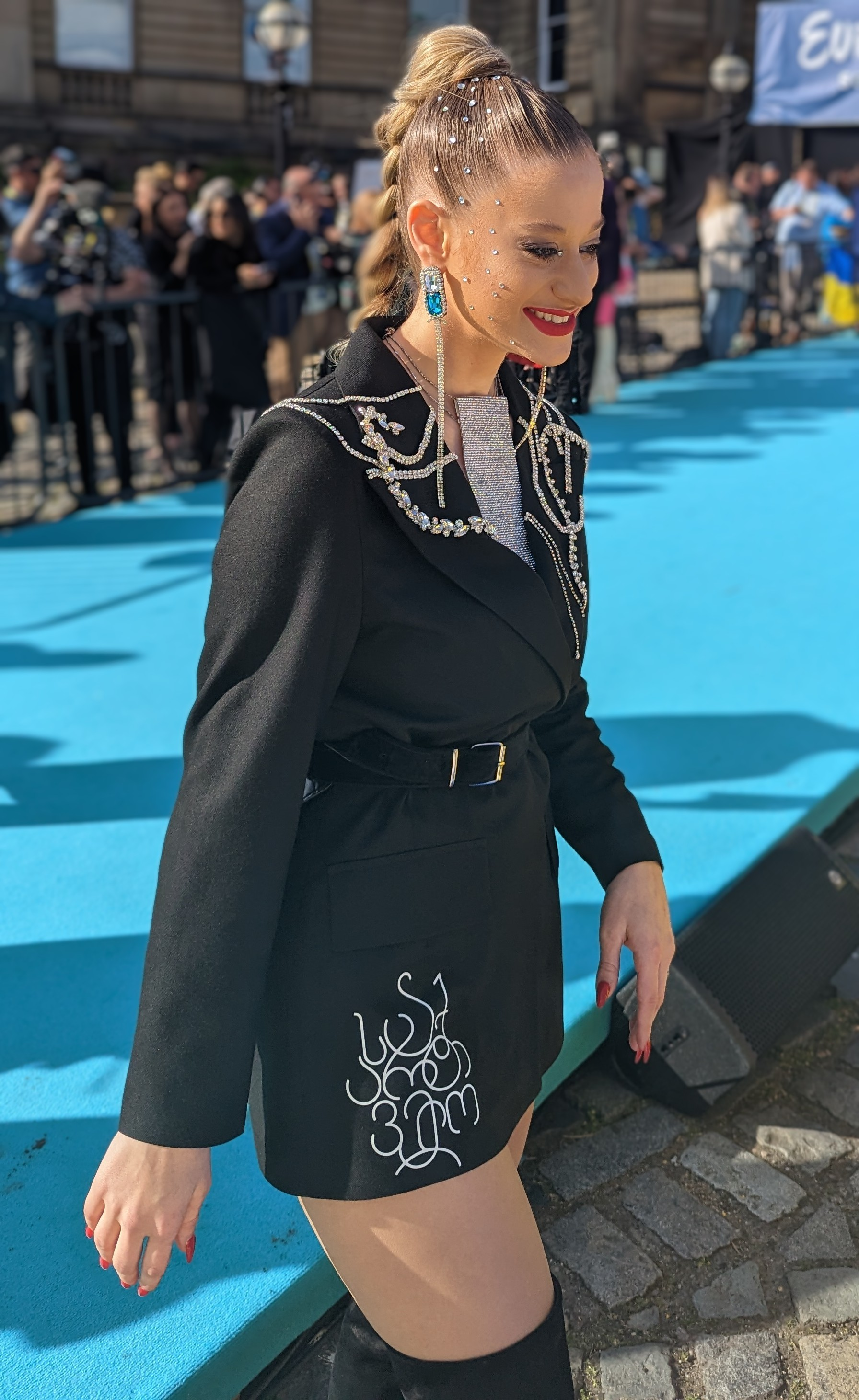
- Khechanovi in 2023

Background information
- Also known as: Iru
- Born: Irina Khechanovi; 3 December 2000 (age 25); Tbilisi, Georgia
- Genres: Pop
- Occupations: Singer; songwriter
- Years active: 2011–present
- Label: Giga Production
- Formerly of: Candy

Irina "Iru" Khechanovi (Georgian: ირინა "ირუ" ხეჩანოვი; IPA: [iɾu χetʃʰanovi]; born 3 December 2000), known professionally as Iru (stylised in all caps), is a Georgian singer and songwriter. As a member of the girl group Candy, she won the Junior Eurovision Song Contest 2011 with the song "Candy Music". In 2023, she won the fifth season of The Voice Georgia, and went onto represent Georgia in the Eurovision Song Contest 2023.

== Biography ==
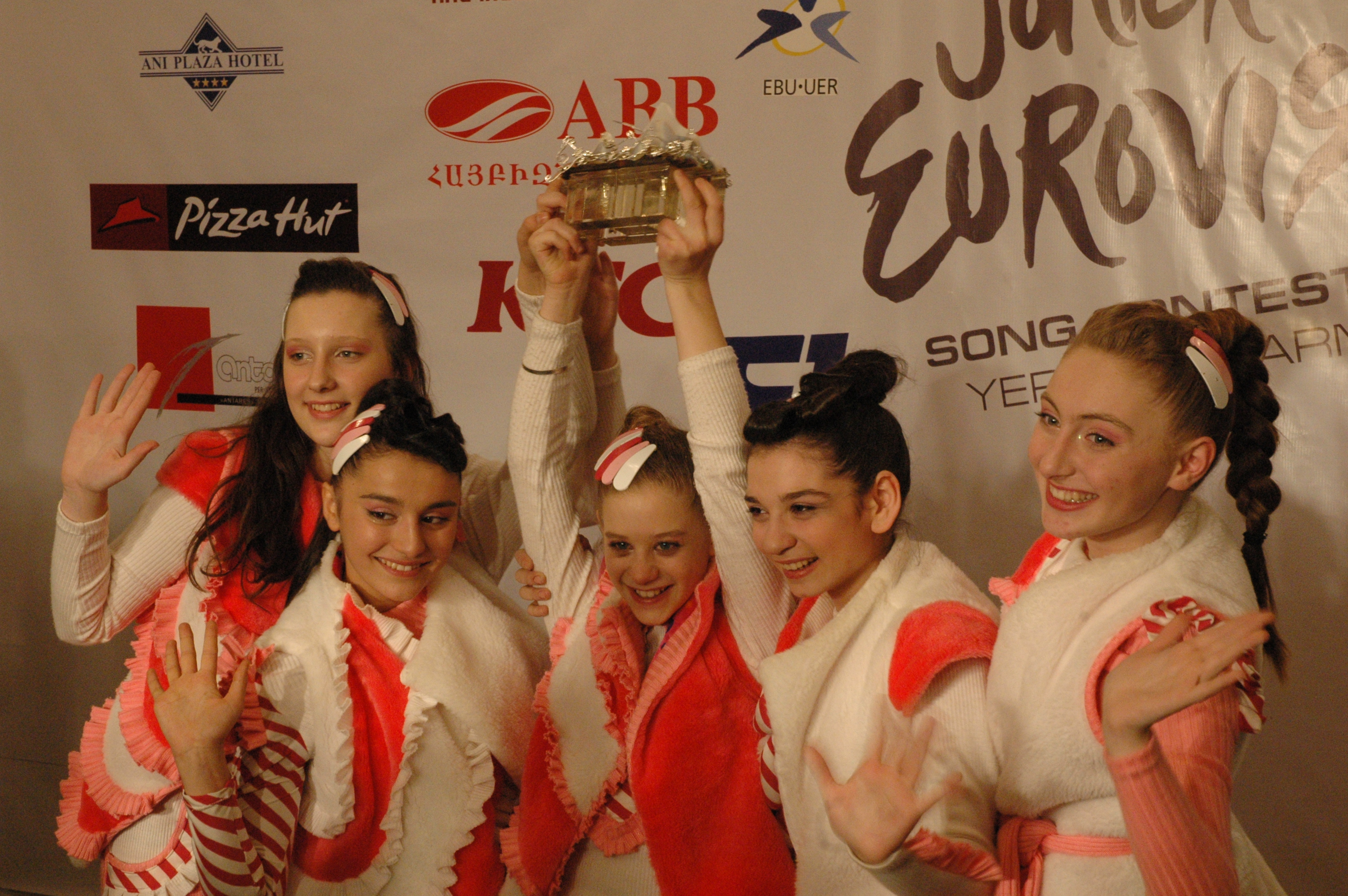
Khechanovi (centre) after winning the Junior Eurovision Song Contest 2011

Irina Khechanovi was born on 3 December 2000 in Tbilisi. She is of Armenian descent. As a child, she took part in various singing competitions. In 2011, on her eleventh birthday, she represented Georgia in the Junior Eurovision Song Contest 2011 in Yerevan, Armenia as a member of the girl group Candy. The group won the competition with 108 points.

In 2019, Khechanovi was a participant in Georgian Idol. In 2021, she released her debut solo single "No Jerk Around Me".

In 2022, Khechanovi performed at the Junior Eurovision Song Contest 2022 as part of a previous winners' medley. She had also co-written the song "I Believe" by Mariam Bigvava, the Georgian entry for that year's contest. The entry finished in third place.

Later that year, Khechanovi was a participant in the fifth season of The Voice Georgia. She went on to win the competition on 2 February 2023, thereby winning the right to represent Georgia in the Eurovision Song Contest 2023. Her entry "Echo" was released on 16 March 2023. She performed in the second semi-final on 11 May 2023, but finished in 12th place and therefore did not qualify to the grand final.

In December 2025, Khechanovi and the other members of Candy performed as an interval act at the Junior Eurovision Song Contest 2025. They performed the song "Code".

The Voice Georgia performances and results
| Round | Song | Original artist | Result |
|---|---|---|---|
| Blind Auditions | "Never Enough" | Loren Allred | Joined Team Dato Porchkhidze |
| The Battles | "Leave the Door Open" | Silk Sonic | Advanced |
| Quarter-finals | "Smells Like Teen Spirit" / "Around The World" | Nirvana / Daft Punk | Advanced |
| Semi-final | "Rise Like a Phoenix" | Conchita Wurst | Advanced |
| Final | "Euphoria" | Loreen | Winner |

== Discography ==
=== Singles ===
- 2021 – "No Jerk Around Me"
- 2022 – "Not Like Today"
- 2022 – "Tu mama"
- 2023 – "Idea"
- 2023 – "Echo"
- 2023 – "Seen"

Awards and achievements
| Preceded by Magda Ivanishvili | The Voice Georgia winner 2022–2023 | Succeeded by TBD |
| Preceded by Circus Mircus with "Lock Me In" | Georgia in the Eurovision Song Contest; 2023 | Succeeded by Nutsa Buzaladze with "Firefighter" |
