= Circus Mircus =

Georgian progressive rock band

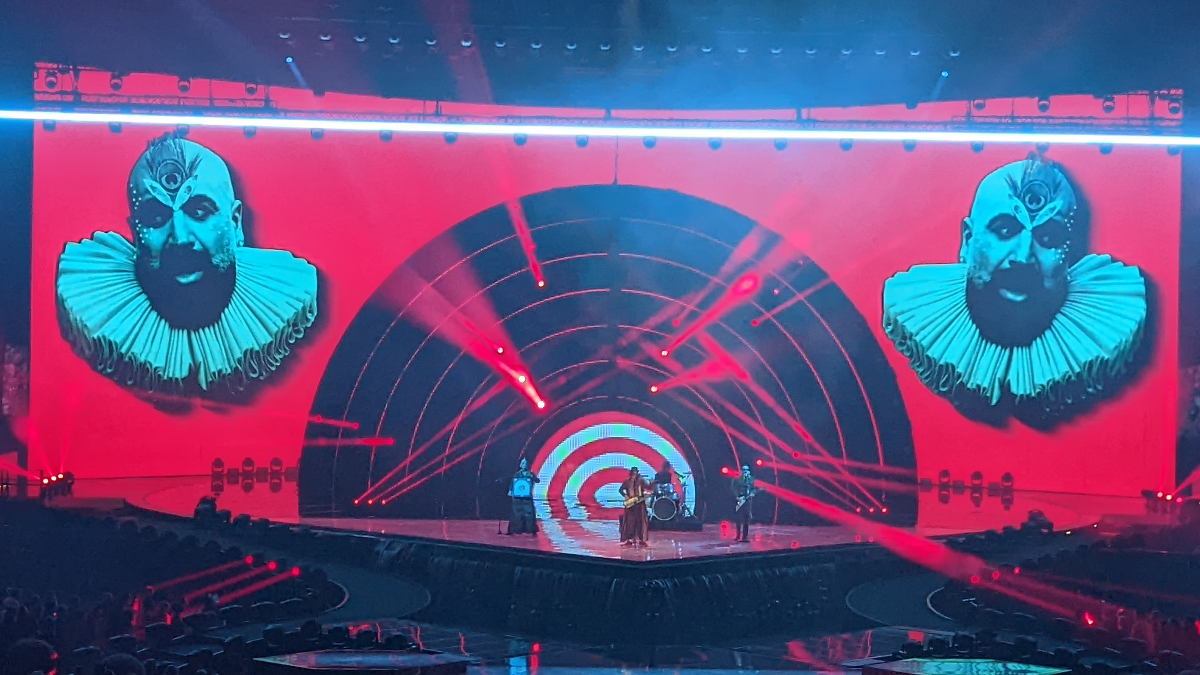
- Circus Mircus at the Eurovision Song Contest 2022.

Background information
- Origin: Tbilisi, Georgia
- Years active: 2020–present
- Label: Stockton Records
- Members: Shota Darakhvelidze (Ludwig Ramírez); Nika Kocharov (Igor Von Lichtenstein); Sandro Sulakvelidze (Bavonc Gevorkyan); Archil Sulakvelidze (Iago Waitman)

Circus Mircus (Georgian: ცირკუს მირკუსი) are a Georgian progressive rock band. The band mostly plays experimental music, mixing numerous genres, each representing a life experience and the "inner world" of each member. They represented Georgia in the Eurovision Song Contest 2022 with the song "Lock Me In", placing 18th in the second semi-final, failing to qualify for the final.

Circus Mircus consists of four members, who use pseudonyms. Shota Darakhvelidze plays Ludwig Ramírez (bassist), Nika Kocharov plays Igor Von Lichtenstein (vocalist, guitarist), Sandro Sulakvelidze plays Bavonc Gevorkyan (drummer), and Archil Sulakvelidze plays Iago Waitman (vocalist and keyboardist).

== History ==
The band was supposedly formed at the end of 2020 in Tbilisi, when three local circus academy dropouts became friends and left the academy to start their own band. According to a member of the band, the three "weren't good enough, [we were] probably the worst in the crew, [and] that's why we became friends."

Allegedly, the fourth member was added when they "picked [him] up from the street and promoted [him] to bass player." While the names of the group's members have since been revealed, playing with identity is significant to Circus Mircus' group persona. They state, "identities are so old fashioned and we don't care about faces, as you can always be whatever you want to be, as long as you work hard."

On 14 November 2021, it was announced that the group had been internally chosen by Georgian Public Broadcasting to represent the country in the Eurovision Song Contest 2022. Their competing song "Lock Me In" was released on 9 March 2022. They performed 5th in the second semi final, and came 18th (last) with 22 points; 13 from the professional juries and 9 from the televote, failing to qualify for the grand final.

Their songs "Weather Support", "23:34", and "Rocha" were nominated for an Electronauts Award in the category of "Best Music Video".

=== 2022-present: Post Eurovision and debut album ===
Following Eurovision, the band released five singles between August 2022 and March 2023, and also dropped the use of their pseudonyms in favour of their real names. They then went on to headline the 2023 edition of Tbilisi Open Air in June 2023.

Following a several month hiatus of releasing music, the band released the single Up is Down on 10 November 2023, the first single from their debut album: Furore/Fiasco'. 4 days later, they released the second single from the album: ამერიკის ხმა (Voice of America), the band’s debut song in their native Georgian. In an interview with Billboard Georgia released on the same day, Kocharov stated that for the recording process of the album, the band spent two weeks together in a house in Kotoraantkari, Mtskheta, and "cut off all contact from the outside world" to write the album in this period. For many music videos for the album, the band asked friends individually to create a video about them. The release date for the album was also revealed as 20 November 2023.

== Discography ==
=== Albums ===
Title	Details
Furore/Fiasco	Released: 20 November 2023; Label: Stockton Records; Format: Digital download, streaming

=== Extended plays ===
Title	Details
Circus Mircus	Released: 5 December 2020; Label: Self-released; Format: Digital download, streaming
Akhalteke	Released: 11 February 2026; Label: Stockton Records; Format: Digital download, streaming

=== Singles ===
Title	Year	Album
"The Ode to the Bishkek Stone"	2020	Non-album singles
"Semi-Pro"	2021	Non-album singles
"Better Late"	2021	Non-album singles
"Weather Support"	2021	Non-album singles
"Rocha"	2021	Non-album singles
"23:34"	2021	Non-album singles
"Musicien"	2021	Non-album singles
"Lock Me In"	2022	Non-album singles
"Love Letters"	2022	Non-album singles
"Soul Pop"	2022	Non-album singles
"Realizo" (featuring Blolbrst & Tato Rusia)	2022	Non-album singles
"Lizard in a Fish Tank" (featuring Qaji Todia)	2022	Non-album singles
"Pin-Drop Mind"	2023	Non-album singles
"Up is Down"	2023	Furore/Fiasco
"ამერიკის ხმა (Voice of America)"	2023	Furore/Fiasco

Awards and achievements
Preceded by Tornike Kipiani with "You"	Georgia in the Eurovision Song Contest; 2022	Succeeded by Iru with "Echo"
