= Georgia in the Eurovision Song Contest 2022 =

- Eurovision Song Contest 2022
- Country: Georgia
- Selection process: Internal selection
- Announcement date: Artist: 14 November 2021; Song: 9 March 2022

Competing entry
- Song: "Lock Me In"
- Artist: Circus Mircus
- Songwriters: Circus Mircus

Placement
- Semi-final result: Failed to qualify (18th)

Participation chronology

Georgia was represented at the Eurovision Song Contest 2022 in Turin, Italy, having internally selected Circus Mircus to represent the country with the song "Lock Me In". Georgia failed to qualify, performing in the second semifinal.

Georgia was drawn to compete in the second semi-final of the Eurovision Song Contest which took place on 12 May 2022. Performing during the show in position 5, "Lock Me In" was not announced among the top 10 entries of the second semi-final and therefore did not qualify to compete in the final. It was later revealed that Georgia placed last out of the 18 participating countries in the semi-final with 22 points.

== Background ==
Prior to the 2022 contest, Georgia has participated in the Eurovision Song Contest thirteen times since their first entry in 2007. The nation's highest placing in the contest, to this point, has been ninth place, which was achieved on two occasions: in Georgia with the song "Shine" performed by Sofia Nizharadze and in 2011 with the song "One More Day" performed by Eldrine. The nation briefly withdrew from the contest in 2009 after the European Broadcasting Union (EBU) rejected the Georgian entry, "We Don't Wanna Put In", for perceived political references to Vladimir Putin who was the Russian Prime Minister at the time. The withdrawal and fallout was tied to tense relations between Georgia and then host country Russia, which stemmed from the 2008 Russo-Georgian War. Following the introduction of semi-finals, Georgia has, to this point, failed to qualify to the final on five occasions.

The Georgian national broadcaster, Georgian Public Broadcaster (GPB), broadcasts the event within Georgia and organises the selection process for the nation's entry. Georgia has selected their entry for the Eurovision Song Contest both through national finals and internal selections in the past. In 2013 and 2014, GPB opted to internally select the Georgian entry, in 2015, the Georgian entry was selected via a national final, and in 2016, the artist was internally selected while the song was chosen in a national final. For their 2017 participation, the entry was selected through a national final. In 2018 the artist was internally selected. In 2019, the entry was fully selected through Georgian Idol for the first time ever, and the show was used again to select the singer the following year. However, after the 2020 contest was cancelled, the broadcaster reverted to an internal selection in 2021, when the country was represented by Tornike Kipiani and "You". The entry failed to qualify from the second semi-final, placing 16th with 16 points.

== Before Eurovision ==
=== Internal selection ===
On 20 September 2021, GPB confirmed their intention to take part in the Eurovision Song Contest 2022. On 11 November 2021, the broadcaster confirmed that they had carried out an internal selection in collaboration with music producers, choosing a group to represent them at the contest. On 14 November 2021, Circus Mircus were announced as the selected entrants. Their entry "Lock Me In" was released on 9 March 2022.

== At Eurovision ==
According to Eurovision rules, all nations with the exceptions of the host country and the "Big Five" (France, Germany, Italy, Spain and the United Kingdom) are required to qualify from one of two semi-finals in order to compete for the final; the top ten countries from each semi-final progress to the final. The European Broadcasting Union (EBU) split up the competing countries into six different pots based on voting patterns from previous contests, with countries with favourable voting histories put into the same pot. On 25 January 2022, an allocation draw was held which placed each country into one of the two semi-finals, as well as which half of the show they would perform in. Georgia has been placed into the second semi-final, to be held on 12 May 2022, and has been scheduled to perform in the first half of the show.

Once all the competing songs for the 2022 contest had been released, the running order for the semi-finals was decided by the shows' producers rather than through another draw, so that similar songs were not placed next to each other. Georgia was set to perform in position 5, following the entry from Azerbaijan and before the entry from Malta.

=== Voting ===
==== Points awarded to Georgia ====
Points awarded to Georgia (Semi-final 2)
Score	Televote	Jury
12 points		
10 points		
8 points		
7 points		
6 points		
5 points	Israel	Czech Republic
4 points		
3 points		Estonia; Germany
2 points	Finland	
1 point	Australia; Estonia	Australia; Malta

==== Points awarded by Georgia ====
Points awarded by Georgia (Semi-final 2)
Score	Televote	Aggregated jury
12 points	Serbia	Sweden
10 points	Israel	Australia
8 points	Sweden	Poland
7 points	Estonia	Estonia
6 points	Finland	Czech Republic
5 points	Romania	Belgium
4 points	Czech Republic	Azerbaijan
3 points	Poland	Finland
2 points	Australia	Serbia
1 point	Cyprus	Malta

Points awarded by Georgia (Final)
Score	Televote	Aggregated jury
12 points	Ukraine	United Kingdom
10 points	Armenia	Italy
8 points	Moldova	Sweden
7 points	Serbia	Portugal
6 points	Spain	Ukraine
5 points	Lithuania	Spain
4 points	United Kingdom	Netherlands
3 points	Azerbaijan	Greece
2 points	Finland	Poland
1 point	Greece	France

==== Jury vote issues ====
In a statement released during the broadcast of the grand final, the EBU revealed that six countries, including Georgia, were found to have 'irregular' jury voting patterns during the second semi-final. Consequently, these countries were given substitute aggregated jury scores for both the second semi-final and the grand final (shown above), calculated from the corresponding jury scores of countries with historically similar voting patterns as determined by the pots for the semi-final allocation draw held in January. Their televoting results were unaffected. The Flemish broadcaster VRT reported that the juries involved had made agreements to vote for each other's entries to secure qualification to the grand final.

During the broadcast of the final, Georgia's votes were read by the EBU's Executive Supervisor, Martin Österdahl, instead of the scheduled spokesperson, Helen Kalandadze. This was attributed to connection difficulties during the voting, however Azerbaijan's broadcaster İTV, whose jury had also been identified as showing irregular voting patterns, released a statement implying that this was instead due to their refusal to present the calculated aggregate scores. The Georgian broadcaster GPB released a statement requesting further clarification and also revealed that Ukraine would have received the 12 points from the Georgian jury under the removed votes instead of the United Kingdom.

On 19 May, the EBU issued a further statement clarifying the voting irregularities identified in the second semi-final. This confirmed that the six countries involved had consistently ranked each other's entries disproportionately highly: the Georgian jury, as well as the juries from Azerbaijan, Romania and San Marino, had each ranked the other five countries' entries as their top five, proving beyond statistical coincidence that they had colluded to achieve a higher placing. This prompted the suspension of Georgia's intended jury scores (shown below) in favour of the EBU's calculated aggregate scores, shown above.

Georgia's suspended jury results (Semi-final 2)
Score	Country
12 points	Azerbaijan
10 points	Montenegro
8 points	Romania
7 points	San Marino
6 points	Poland
5 points	Israel
4 points	Ireland
3 points	Estonia
2 points	Finland
1 point	Australia

Detailed voting results of Georgia's suspended vote (Semi-final 2)
R/O	Country	Juror 1	Juror 2	Juror 3	Juror 4	Juror 5	Rank	Points
01	Finland	15	10	4	4	16	9	2
02	Israel	3	8	10	6	7	6	5
03	Serbia	12	9	8	15	11	11	
04	Azerbaijan	2	1	3	1	1	1	12
05	Georgia							
06	Malta	13	11	16	7	12	12	
07	San Marino	14	5	5	3	2	4	7
08	Australia	5	12	9	5	17	10	1
09	Cyprus	8	15	12	16	14	15	
10	Ireland	6	7	7	13	6	7	4
11	North Macedonia	10	13	15	14	10	14	
12	Estonia	11	4	13	12	4	8	3
13	Romania	9	3	2	8	3	3	8
14	Poland	4	6	6	10	5	5	6
15	Montenegro	1	2	1	2	8	2	10
16	Belgium	16	14	11	17	15	17	
17	Sweden	17	17	14	11	9	16	
18	Czech Republic	7	16	17	9	13	13	

==== Detailed final results ====
Detailed voting results from Georgia (Semi-final 2)
R/O	Country	Aggregated jury (Note: Georgia was among the six countries whose jury results were found to have had irregular voting patterns. Their jury votes were substituted with aggregated jury results for the second semi-final and the final based on countries with similar voting patterns, as determined by the pots that the countries were put into for the semi-final allocation draw.)		Televote	
R/O	Country	Rank	Points	Rank	Points
01	Finland	8	3	5	6
02	Israel	11		2	10
03	Serbia	9	2	1	12
04	Azerbaijan	7	4	11	
05	Georgia				
06	Malta	10	1	13	
07	San Marino	16		15	
08	Australia	2	10	9	2
09	Cyprus	17		10	1
10	Ireland	14		14	
11	North Macedonia	13		16	
12	Estonia	4	7	4	7
13	Romania	12		6	5
14	Poland	3	8	8	3
15	Montenegro	15		17	
16	Belgium	6	5	12	
17	Sweden	1	12	3	8
18	Czech Republic	5	6	7	4

Detailed voting results from Georgia (Final)
R/O	Country	Aggregated jury		Televote	
R/O	Country	Rank	Points	Rank	Points
01	Czech Republic	15		21	
02	Romania	22		20	
03	Portugal	4	7	15	
04	Finland	20		9	2
05	Switzerland	11		25	
06	France	10	1	19	
07	Norway	17		13	
08	Armenia	18		2	10
09	Italy	2	10	18	
10	Spain	6	5	5	6
11	Netherlands	7	4	16	
12	Ukraine	5	6	1	12
13	Germany	21		17	
14	Lithuania	25		6	5
15	Azerbaijan	13		8	3
16	Belgium	16		24	
17	Greece	8	3	10	1
18	Iceland	23		22	
19	Moldova	19		3	8
20	Sweden	3	8	12	
21	Australia	12		23	
22	United Kingdom	1	12	7	4
23	Poland	9	2	14	
24	Serbia	24		4	7
25	Estonia	14		11	
