= Helle, Møre og Romsdal =

Village in Haram Municipality, Norway

Helle
- Village
- Interactive map of Helle
- Location within Møre og Romsdal Location within Norway
- Coordinates: 62.6101°N 6.6260°E
- Country: Norway
- Region: Western Norway
- County: Møre og Romsdal
- District: Sunnmøre
- Municipality: Haram Municipality
- Elevation: 48 m (157 ft)
- Time zone: UTC+01:00 (CET)
  - Summer (DST): UTC+02:00 (CEST)
- Post Code: 6265 Vatne

Helle is a small village in Haram Municipality in Møre og Romsdal county, Norway. It is located along the Vatnefjorden in the northeastern part of the mainland portion of the municipality, about 6.5 kilometres (4.0 mi) north of the village of Vatne.
