= The Voice Georgia season 5 =

The Voice Georgia
- Season 5
- Hosted by: Gvantsa Daraselia
- Coaches: Dato Porchkhidze; Dato Evgenidze; Sopo Toroshelidze; Stephane Mgebrishvili
- No. of contestants: 32 artists
- Winner: Iru Khechanovi
- Winning coach: Dato Porchkhidze
- Runner-up: Giorgi Datiashvili
- No. of episodes: 10

Release
- Original network: 1TV
- Original release: 8 December 2022 – 2 February 2023

The fifth season of the Georgian reality television series The Voice Georgia premiered on 8 December 2022 on 1TV. Stephane Mgebrishvili was the only coach returning from the previous season and Dato Porchkhidze returned after a two-season hiatus. Meanwhile, Sopo Toroshelidze and Dato Evgenidze debuted as coaches, and Gvantsa Daraselia debuted as the show's presenter.

Broadcaster 1TV announced the opening of applications on 23 August 2022, which would close on 20 September. With this announcement, the channel also revealed that the competition would be used to choose the Georgian representative for the Eurovision Song Contest 2023. The season finale was aired on 2 February 2023. Iru Khechanovi was named as the winner of this season, marking Dato Porchkhidze's third win as a coach.

== Teams ==
Teams color key
Winner	Seventh place
Runner-up	Eighth place
Third place	Eliminated in the Live Shows
Fourth place	Stolen in the Battles
Fifth place	Eliminated in the Battles
Sixth place	Withdrew

Coaches' teams
Coach	Top 32 artists				
Dato Porchkhidze					
Dato Porchkhidze	Iru Khechanovi	Tako Kakalashvili	Erekle Turkadze	Tsotne Barbakadze	Ekaterine Mdivani
Dato Porchkhidze	Irakli Kapanadze	~~Ani Nozadze~~	~~Nini Asiliani~~	~~Kakha Aslamazashvili~~	Koka Davitadze
Dato "Evgena" Evgenidze					
Dato "Evgena" Evgenidze	Giorgi Datiashvili	Kakha Aslamazashvili	Allegro	Giorgi Putkaradze	Gvantsa Kupatadze
Dato "Evgena" Evgenidze	Ani Nozadze	~~Ekaterine Mdivani~~	Mariam Buighlishvili	Salome Takaishvili	Sopo Garakanidze
Sopo Toroshelidze					
Sopo Toroshelidze	Lika Siradze	Tina Datikashvili	Mariam Toronjadze	Salome Tsintsadze	Ana Vashakmadze
Sopo Toroshelidze	Sopo Batilashvili	~~Mariam Kokeladze~~	~~Tako Kakalashvili~~	Anika Gabiskiria	Anri Bolkvadze
Stephane Mgebrishvili					
Stephane Mgebrishvili	Likuna Tutisani	Anka Tatarashvili	Dato Rusadze	Saba Chachua	Mariam Kokeladze
Stephane Mgebrishvili	Nini Asiliani	~~Ana Vashakmadze~~	~~Mariam Toronjadze~~	Aliona Tsintsadze	Luka Niavadze
Note: Italicized names are stolen artists (names struck through within former teams).

== Blind auditions ==
The blind auditions were aired on 8, 15, 22 and 29 December 2022. In each audition, an artist sings their piece in front of the coaches, whose chairs are facing the audience. If a coach is interested to further work with the artist, they press their button to face the contestant. If a singular coach presses the button, the artist automatically becomes part of their team, and if multiple coaches turn they will compete for the artist, who will decide which team they will join. The artists who qualified for the battles round from each show are shown below. Among them, there were three contestants who previously auditioned successfully in the previous season: Anka Tatarashvili and Luka Niavadze (who both joined Team Stephane), and Salome Tsintsadze (who joined Team Salio).

Blind auditions show 1 – 8 December 2022
Artist	Song	Team joined
Likuna Tutisani	"Ain't No Way"	Stephane
Salome Takaishvili	"Uninvited"	Evgena
Kakha Aslamazashvili	"Is This Love"	Dato
Salome Tsintsadze	"You Oughta Know"	Sopo
Aliona Tsintsadze	"Bez boyu" (Без бою)	Stephane
Giorgi Datiashvili	"If I Get High"	Evgena
Lika Siradze	"Where Did You Sleep Last Night?"	Sopo
Tsotne Barbakadze	"Tennessee Whiskey"	Dato

Blind auditions show 2 – 15 December 2022
Artist	Song	Team joined
Mariam Bugianishvili	"La Vie en rose"	Evgena
Saba Chachua	"That's What I Like"	Stephane
Tako Kakalashvili	"Driver's License"	Sopo
Erekle Turkadze	"Virtual Insanity"	Dato
Dato Rusadze	"Beneath Your Beautiful"	Stephane
Ekaterine Mdivani	"Babooshka"	Evgena
Anri Bolkvadze	"Trymai" (Тримай)	Sopo
Tina Datikashvili	"Anyone"	Sopo

Blind auditions show 3 – 22 December 2022
Artist	Song	Team joined
Iru Khechanovi	"Never Enough"	Dato
Anka Tatarashvili	"I Never Loved a Man..."	Stephane
Anika Gabiskiria	"Kiss From a Rose"	Sopo
Gvantsa Kupatadze	"Teenage Fantasy"	Evgena
Sopo Garakanidze	"All I Want"	Evgena
Sopo Batilashvili	"Nothing Compares 2 U"	Sopo
Allegro	"Per te"	Evgena

Blind auditions show 4 – 29 December 2022
Artist	Song	Team joined
Nini Alisiani	"How Come You Don't Call Me"	Dato
Luka Niavadze	"Fly On"	Stephane
Koka Davitadze	"Make You Feel My Love"	Dato
Mariam Kokeladze	"No More Blues"	Sopo
Giorgi Putkaradze	"Iron Sky"	Evgena
Ani Nozadze	"When We Were Young"	Dato
Ana Vashakmadze	"It's a Man's Man's Man's World"	Stephane
Mariam Toronjadze	"What a Girl Wants"	Stephane

== Battles ==
The battles shows were aired on 31 December 2022 and 5 January 2023. In this round, the coaches pick two of their artists to compete in a singing match and select one of them to advance to the next round. Losing artists may be stolen by another coach, becoming new members of their team. Multiple coaches can attempt to steal an artist, resulting in a competition for the artist, who will ultimately decide which team they will go to. Every coach stole two eliminated artists: Ana Vashakmadze and Mariam Toronjadze were stolen by Sopo Toroshelidze, Mariam Kokeladze and Nini Alisiani were stolen by Stephane Mgebrishvili, Ani Nozadze and Kakha Aslamazashvili were stolen by Dato Evgenidze, and Ekaterine Mdivani and Tako Kakalashvili were stolen by Dato Porchkhidze.

Battles color key
Artist won the battle and advanced to the quarter-finals
Artist lost the battle, but was stolen by another coach
Artist lost the battle and was eliminated

Battles show 1 – 31 December 2022
Order	Coach	Winner	Song	Loser	Saving coach
1	Stephane	Likuna Tutisani	"I'm Your Baby Tonight"	Mariam Toronjadze	Sopo
2	Sopo	Tina Datikashvili	"Ain't No Mountain High Enough"	Anri Bolkvadze	—N/a
3	Dato	Iru Khechanovi	"Leave the Door Open"	Ani Nozadze	Evgena
4	Evgena	Giorgi Datiashvili	"You Don't Know My Nation"	Ekaterine Mdivani	Dato
5	Stephane	Dato Rusadze	"My Funny Valentine"	Aliona Tsintsadze	—N/a
6	Sopo	Sopo Batilashvili	"Try (Just a Little Bit Harder)"	Tako Kakalashvili	Dato
7	Dato	Tsotne Barbakadze	"No Woman, No Cry"	Kakha Aslamazashvili	Evgena
8	Evgena	Allegro	"Silent Night"	Mariam Bugianishvili	—N/a

Battles show 2 – 5 January 2023
Order	Coach	Winner	Song	Loser	Saving coach
1	Stephane	Saba Chachua	"Déjà Vu"	Ana Vashakmadze	Sopo
2	Dato	Erekle Turkadze	"Love's in Need of Love Today"	Nini Alisiani	Stephane
3	Sopo	Salome Tsintsadze	"No Diggity"	Mariam Kokeladze	Stephane
4	Stephane	Anka Tatarashvili	"Purple Rain"	Luka Niavadze	—N/a
5	Evgena	Giorgi Putkaradze	"Emotions"	Salome Takaishvili	—N/a
6	Sopo	Lika Siradze	"Hedonism"	Anika Gabiskiria	—N/a
7	Dato	Irakli Kapanadze	"After the Love Has Gone"	Koka Davitadze	—N/a
8	Evgena	Gvantsa Kupatadze	"Don't Be Afraid"	Sopo Garakanidze	—N/a

== Live shows ==
=== Quarter-finals (12 and 19 January) ===
The quarter-finals took place on 12 and 19 January 2023. The six remaining acts in each team performed and a public televote picked three artists to advance directly to the semi-final. An additional wildcard was then picked by the coach of the team from the eliminated acts. The quarter-finals were the first live shows of the season, with the previous episodes being pre-recorded. Ani Nozadze, who was originally selected to be part of Team Evgena following the battles, withdrew from the competition before the quarter-finals due to health issues.

Team Stephane – 12 January 2023
Order	Artist	Song	Televote	Place	Result
1	Saba Chachua	"Rock with You"	18.03%	3	Advanced
2	Dato Rusadze	"Gogov gogov shavtvala" (გოგოვ გოგოვ შავთვალა)	17.28%	4	Wildcard
3	Nini Asiliani	"Ain't Nobody (Loves Me Better)"	9.46%	6	Eliminated
4	Anka Tatarashvili	"Got to Be Real"	21.51%	2	Advanced
5	Mari Kokeladze	"Mercy"	9.90%	5	Eliminated
6	Likuna Tutisani	"He Loves Me (Lyzel in E Flat)"	34.80%	1	Advanced

Team Sopo – 12 January 2023
Order	Artist	Song	Televote	Place	Result
1	Sali Tsintsadze	"What You Waiting For?"	17.93%	3	Advanced
2	Lika Siradze	"Cochise"	14.53%	4	Wildcard
3	Sopo Batilashvili	"Stairway to Heaven"	8.19%	5	Eliminated
4	Ana Vashakmadze	"I See Red"	4.49%	6	Eliminated
5	Mari Toronjadze	"Stay with Me"	20.06%	2	Advanced
6	Tina Datikashvili	"Queen"	34.80%	1	Advanced

Team Dato – 19 January 2023
Order	Artist	Song	Televote	Place	Result
1	Iru Khechanovi	"Smells Like Teen Spirit" / "Around The World"	35.31%	1	Advanced
2	Erekle Turkadze	"Golden Hour"	22.67%	2	Advanced
3	Tsotne Barbakadze	"If You Don't Know Me by Now"	5.62%	5	Wildcard
4	Irakli Kapanadze	"Everything I Wanted"	15.09%	4	Eliminated
5	Ekaterine Mdivani	"Habanera"	5.20%	6	Eliminated
6	Tako Kakalashvili	"Habits (Stay High)"	16.11%	3	Advanced

Team Evgena – 19 January 2023
Order	Artist	Song	Televote	Place	Result
1	Kakha Aslamazishvili	"Time"	17.90%	3	Advanced
2	Allegro	"Luna"	19.30%	2	Advanced
3	Giorgi Putkaradze	"Sunburn"	28.55%	1	Advanced
4	Giorgi Datiashvili	"Heaven on Their Minds"	17.39%	4	Wildcard
5	Gvantsa Kupatadze	"The Way You Make Me Feel"	16.86%	5	Eliminated

=== Semi-final (26 January) ===
The semi-final took place on 26 January 2023. The four remaining acts in each team performed and a public televote picked one artist to advance directly to the final. An additional wildcard was then picked by the coach of the team from the eliminated acts.

Team Stephane – 26 January 2023
Order	Artist	Song	Televote	Place	Result
1	Anka Tatarashvili	"Best Part"	31.92%	1	Advanced
2	Likuna Tutisani	"I Say a Little Prayer"	29.13%	2	Wildcard
3	Dato Rusadze	"Fix You"	19.97%	3	Eliminated
4	Saba Chachua	"Dream On"	18.98%	4	Eliminated

Team Sopo – 26 January 2023
Order	Artist	Song	Televote	Place	Result
1	Mari Toronjadze	"Queen of the Night"	18.73%	3	Eliminated
2	Tina Datikashvili	"Higher Ground"	30.32%	2	Wildcard
3	Lika Siradze	"Street Spirit"	40.58%	1	Advanced
4	Sali Tsintsadze	"Mad About You"	10.37%	4	Eliminated

Team Dato – 26 January 2023
Order	Artist	Song	Televote	Place	Result
1	Iru Khechanovi	"Rise Like a Phoenix"	44.52%	1	Advanced
2	Tako Kakalashvili	"How Deep Is Your Love"	17.89%	3	Wildcard
3	Tsotne Barbakadze	"Keeping Me Alive"	7.67%	4	Eliminated
4	Erekle Turkadze	"Jealous"	29.92%	2	Eliminated

Team Evgena – 26 January 2023
Order	Artist	Song	Televote	Place	Result
1	Kakha Aslamazishvili	"Dark Necessities"	14.18%	4	Wildcard
2	Giorgi Datiashvili	"Fragile"	33.77%	1	Advanced
3	Giorgi Putkaradze	"Shenamde sharebi shoria" (შენამდე შარები შორია)	30.33%	2	Eliminated
4	Allegro	"Grande Amore"	21.72%	3	Eliminated

=== Final (2 February) ===
The final took place on 2 February 2023. The 8 remaining artists performed one after the other, with no eliminations. The singer with the most votes from the public wins the talent show and will represent Georgia in the Eurovision Song Contest 2023.

Final – 2 February 2023
Order	Coach	Artist	Song	Televote	Place
1	Dato	Tako Kakalashvili	"Stand Up"	10.09%	7
2	Sopo	Lika Siradze	"Heroes"	13.73%	4
3	Evgena	Giorgi Datiashvili	"Gethsemane"	15.72%	2
4	Stephane	Likuna Tutisani	"A Song for You"	13.76%	3
5	Sopo	Tina Datikashvili	"I Didn't Know My Own Strength"	10.34%	6
6	Evgena	Kakha Aslamazishvili	"Love You to Death"	2.92%	8
7	Stephane	Anka Tatarashvili	"7 Rings" / "Thank U, Next"	11.56%	5
8	Dato	Iru Khechanovi	"Euphoria"	21.88%	1
