= Eidsvik, Møre og Romsdal =

Village in Haram Municipality, Norway

Eidsvik
- Village
- Interactive map of Eidsvik
- Location within Møre og Romsdal Location within Norway
- Coordinates: 62.5454°N 6.5745°E
- Country: Norway
- Region: Western Norway
- County: Møre og Romsdal
- District: Sunnmøre
- Municipality: Haram Municipality

Area
  - Total: 0.71 km^{2} (0.27 sq mi)
- Elevation: 49 m (161 ft)

Population (2001)
  - Total: 559
  - Density: 787/km^{2} (2,040/sq mi)
- Time zone: UTC+01:00 (CET)
  - Summer (DST): UTC+02:00 (CEST)
- Post Code: 6264 Tennfjord

Eidsvik is a village in Haram Municipality in Møre og Romsdal county, Norway. The village is located between the villages of Tennfjord and Vatne at the end of the Grytafjorden, about 10 kilometres (6.2 mi) north of the village of Skodje.

The 0.71-square-kilometre (180-acre) village had a population (2001) of 559 and a population density of 787 inhabitants per square kilometre (2,040/sq mi). Since 2002, the population and area data for this village area has not been separately tracked by Statistics Norway because it has been considered a part of the Vatne urban area.
