= Greece in the Eurovision Song Contest 2022 =

- Eurovision Song Contest 2022
- Participating broadcaster: Hellenic Broadcasting Corporation (ERT)
- Country: Greece
- Selection process: Internal selection
- Announcement date: Artist: 15 December 2021; Song: 10 March 2022

Competing entry
- Song: "Die Together"
- Artist: Amanda Tenfjord
- Songwriters: Amanda Tenfjord; Bjørn Helge Gammelsæter

Placement
- Semi-final result: Qualified (3rd, 211 points)
- Final result: 8th, 215 points

Participation chronology

Greece was represented at the Eurovision Song Contest 2022 with the song "Die Together", written by Amanda Tenfjord and Bjørn Helge Gammelsæter, and performed by Tenfjord herself. The Greek participating broadcaster, the Hellenic Broadcasting Corporation (ERT), internally selected its entry for the contest. Tenfjord was announced as the Greek representative on 15 December 2021, with her song later presented to the public on 10 March 2022.

To promote the entry, a music video for the song was created as well as an acoustic version. Greece was drawn to compete in the first semi-final of the Eurovision Song Contest which took place on 10 May 2022. Performing during the show in position 15, "Die Together" placed third in the semi-final with 211 points and qualified to compete in the final. In the final, held four days later, Greece placed eighth with 215 points.

== Background ==
Prior to the 2022 contest, Greece had participated in the Eurovision Song Contest 41 times since its debut in 1974. To this point, they won the contest once, in 2005 with the song "My Number One" performed by Helena Paparizou. Following the introduction of semi-finals for the 2004 contest, Greece managed to qualify for the final with each of their entries for several years. Between 2004 and 2013, the nation achieved nine top ten placements in the final. "Utopian Land" by Argo in 2016 failed to qualify the nation to the final for the first time ever, marking Greece's worst result at the contest and leading to their absence from the final for the first time since 2000, a contest they did not take part in. In 2018, Greece failed to qualify for the second time with "Oniro mou" by Yianna Terzi finishing 14th in the semi-final. For the two contests prior to 2022, the nation once again returned to qualifying for the final, including 2021 with "Last Dance" by Stefania, which placed 10th with 170 points.

As part of its duties as participating broadcaster, the Hellenic Broadcasting Corporation (ERT) organises the selection of its entry in the Eurovision Song Contest and broadcasts the event in the country. ERT's predecessor, the National Radio Television Foundation (EIRT), debuted in the contest in 1974 and then ERT participated from 1975 until 2013, when the broadcaster was shut down by a government directive and replaced firstly with the interim broadcaster Dimosia Tileorasi (DT) and then later by New Hellenic Radio, Internet and Television (NERIT). Following the victory of the Syriza party at the January 2015 Greek legislative election, the Hellenic Parliament renamed NERIT to ERT that June. ERT confirmed its intentions to participate at the 2022 contest on 6 September 2021.

== Before Eurovision ==
=== Internal selection ===
On 7 September 2021, ERT opened a submission period where artists and composers were able to submit up to three songs each for consideration by the broadcaster with a 10 October 2021 deadline. Artists were required to be signed to record labels and their proposal had to indicate the accompanying artistic group as well as ideas or concepts for the song's promotion and presentation. Following the deadline, 25 artists were reported to have submitted applications from a total of more than 40 entries, including Constantinos Christophorou (1996, 2002 and 2005 Eurovision entrant for Cyprus), Ilias Kozas (2013 Eurovision entrant for Greece), Joanne (Ioanna Georgakopoulou, winner of The Voice of Greece 7), Jimmy Sion (runner-up of House of Fame), as well as singers Amanda Tenfjord, Artemis Matafia, Evangelia, Good Job Nicky, Kianna, Marseaux, Nikos Ganos, and band Mobvibe.

A seven-member jury panel—chaired by music composer and ERT board member Dimitris Papadimitriou and including ERT figures Maria Kozakou, Fotis Apergis and Konstantinos Bourounis, alongside music producers Petros Adam and Giannis Petridis—shortlisted five entrants in late October 2021. Following this procedure, each member could pick between 5 and 10 entries, and the ones among these that obtained the majority of the preferences were selected to the following phase. The committee then proceeded to discuss with the acts the details of their potential participation at ERT's headquarters and planned to make their final decision by the end of December 2021. On 17 November 2021, Nancy Zampetoglou and Thanasis Anagnostopoulos announced the shortlisted acts on their ERT program Studio 4. These were: Good Job Nicky, Joanna Drigo, Ilias Kozas, Lou Is (stage name of Louiza Sofianopoulou) and Amanda Tenfjord.

Tenfjord was ultimately announced as the selected entrant on 15 December 2021, with her song to be revealed the first week of March 2022. In late February 2022, a demo was leaked of the entry, which was reported to be titled "Die Together". The official reveal of the song took place on 10 March. "Die Together" was written by Tenfjord and Bjørn Helge Gammelsæter and produced by Gammelsæter.

=== Promotion ===
To promote the entry, the music video was released on 10 March during the song's presentation on Studio 4. It had been filmed in early February on the Greek island of Symi. An acoustic version of the song was released on 8 April and was created with the Norwegian University of Science and Technology Medical Students Choir; it was arranged by Edvard Synnes and filmed by Kristoffer Skogheim. Tenfjord performed the song live for the first time on 14 April during ERT's chat show Dynata (Δυνατά) where she also spoke about her upcoming participation in the contest. The appearance also included previous Greek Eurovision contestants Bessy Argyraki (Greece 1977), Nikos Raptakis (Greece 2014) and Konstantinos Christoforou (Cyprus 1996, 2002, 2005).

== At Eurovision ==
The Eurovision Song Contest 2022 took place at the PalaOlimpico in Turin, Italy, and consisted of two semi-finals held on the respective dates of 10 and 12 May and the final on 14 May 2022. According to the Eurovision rules, all participating countries, except the host nation and the "Big Five", consisting of France, Germany, Italy, Spain and the United Kingdom, were required to qualify from one of two semi-finals to compete for the final; the top 10 countries from their respective semi-finals progressed to the final. Prior to the semi-final allocation draw, the European Broadcasting Union (EBU) split the competing countries into six different pots based on voting patterns from previous contests as determined by the contest's televoting partner Digame, with the aim of reducing the chance of neighbourly voting between countries while also increasing suspense during the voting process. On 25 January 2022, the allocation draw was held at Palazzo Madama in Turin that placed each nation into one of the two semi-finals and determined which half of the show they would perform in. Therein, it was announced that Greece was scheduled to perform in the second half of the first semi-final of the contest, to be held on 10 May 2022. Once all the competing entries for the 2022 contest had been released, the running order for the semi-finals was decided by the producers of the contest to prevent similar songs from being placed next to each other. Greece was set to perform in position 15, following the entry from the Iceland and before the entry from Norway. In Greece, all shows were broadcast on ERT1, Deftero Programma and Voice of Greece, with commentary by Maria Kozakou and Giorgos Kapoutzidis.

=== Performances ===
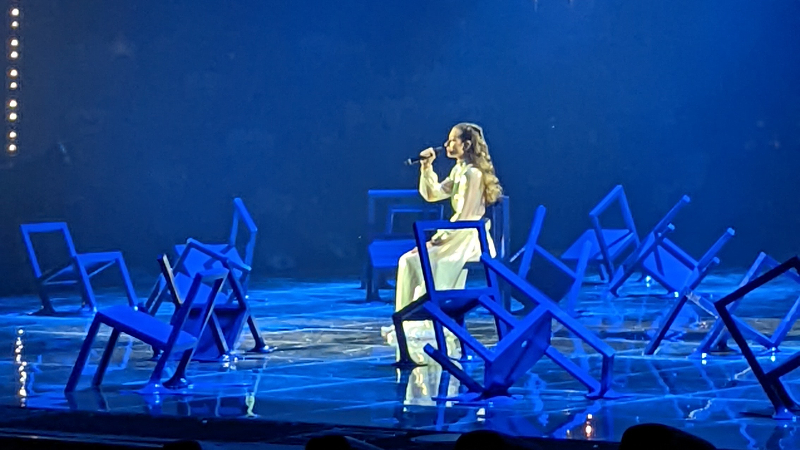
Tenfjord performing "Die Together" on stage at the first semi-final of the Eurovision Song Contest 2022, held on 10 May 2022.

Tenfjord took part in technical rehearsals on 1 and 4 May, followed by dress rehearsals on 9 and 10 May 2022. This included the jury show on 9 May where the professional juries of each country watched and voted on the competing entries. Fokas Evangelinos was the stage director for the performance, having served in that role last year for Greece as well. The Greek performance featured Tenfjord wearing a silvery-white sheer high-necked gown designed by Celia Kritharioti; she was surrounded blue LED lighting and scattered broken chairs that melted into the stage, representing loss and absence. Speaking about his staging strategy, Evangelinos told ERT that Tenfjord's solo appearance and simple presentation emphasises "three elements: the absence, the toll and the grief of a separation". At the end of the semi-final, Greece was announced as having finished in the top 10, subsequently qualifying for the final. This marked the third consecutive qualification to the final for Greece. It was later revealed that "Die Together" placed third in the semi-final, receiving a total of 211 points: 60 points from the televoting and 151 points from the juries.

Shortly after the first semi-final, a winners' press conference was held for the 10 qualifying countries. As part of this press conference, the qualifying artists took part in a draw to determine which half of the final they would subsequently participate in. This draw was done in the order the countries appeared in the semi-final running order. Greece was drawn to compete in the second half. Following this draw, the shows' producers decided upon the running order of the final, as they had done for the semi-finals; Greece was subsequently placed to perform in position 17, following the entry from Belgium and before the entry from Iceland. Tenfjord once again took part in dress rehearsals on 13 and 14 May before the final, including the jury final where the professional juries cast their final votes before the live show. At the 14 May final, Greece placed eighth, scoring 215 points: 57 points from the televoting and 158 points from the juries.

=== Voting ===
Below is a breakdown of points awarded to Greece during the first semi-final and final as well as by Greece on both occasions. Voting during the three shows involved each country awarding two sets of points from 1-8, 10 and 12: one from their professional jury and the other from televoting. The exact composition of the professional jury, and the results of each country's jury and televoting were released after the final; the individual results from each jury member were released in an anonymised form. The Greek jury consisted of Christianna Danezi, Dimitrios Masouras, Elli Karvoni, Nikos Antoniou, and Victoria Chalkitis. In the first semi-final, Greece finished in third place out of 17 entries, marking Greece's third consecutive qualification to the final. The first semi-final of the contest saw Greece receive the top 12 points from Italy, France, the Netherlands and Norway (jury) and Norway (televoting). In the final, Greece received 12 points from Switzerland, Bulgaria, Norway, the Netherlands, Denmark and Cyprus (jury) and Albania (televote). Over the course of the contest, Greece awarded its 12 points to Albania (in both the jury and televote) in the first semi-final and to Azerbaijan (jury) and Spain (televote) in the final. The Greek spokesperson, who announced the top 12-point score awarded by the Greek jury during the final, was 2021 Greek representative Stefania.

==== Points awarded to Greece ====
Points awarded to Greece (Semi-final 1)
Score	Televote	Jury
12 points	Norway	France; Italy; Netherlands; Norway
10 points	Albania; Armenia	Bulgaria; Denmark; Latvia; Switzerland
8 points	Slovenia	Albania; Armenia; Croatia; Moldova
7 points	Bulgaria	Ukraine
6 points		Austria; Lithuania
5 points		Portugal; Slovenia
4 points	Portugal	
3 points	Italy; Netherlands	
2 points		Iceland
1 point	France; Moldova; Ukraine	

Points awarded to Greece (Final)
Score	Televote	Jury
12 points	Albania	Bulgaria; Cyprus; Denmark; Netherlands; Norway; Switzerland
10 points	Cyprus	Italy; San Marino
8 points	Slovenia	
7 points	Norway; San Marino	Latvia; Ukraine
6 points	Bulgaria	Estonia; Finland
5 points		
4 points		Austria; Portugal; Slovenia; United Kingdom
3 points	Armenia; Azerbaijan	Azerbaijan; Croatia; Czech Republic; France; Georgia
2 points		Armenia; Poland; Romania; Spain
1 point	Georgia	Malta

==== Points awarded by Greece ====
Points awarded by Greece (Semi-final 1)
Score	Televote	Jury
12 points	Albania	Albania
10 points	Ukraine	Bulgaria
8 points	Armenia	Croatia
7 points	Norway	Moldova
6 points	Moldova	Netherlands
5 points	Lithuania	Portugal
4 points	Netherlands	Latvia
3 points	Portugal	Ukraine
2 points	Austria	Austria
1 point	Bulgaria	Norway

Points awarded by Greece (Final)
Score	Televote	Jury
12 points	Spain	Azerbaijan
10 points	Ukraine	Poland
8 points	Serbia	Australia
7 points	Italy	Romania
6 points	Norway	Moldova
5 points	United Kingdom	Spain
4 points	Sweden	Netherlands
3 points	Moldova	Portugal
2 points	Romania	Czech Republic
1 point	France	Italy

==== Detailed voting results ====
The following members comprised the Greek jury:

- Christianna Danezi – Musician, singer-songwriter
- Dimitrios Masouras – Production manager, creative director
- Elli Karvoni – Singer-songwriter
- Nikos Antoniou – Musician, producer
- Victoria Chalkitis – Singer, songwriter

Detailed voting results from Greece (Semi-final 1)
R/O	Country	Jury							Televote	
R/O	Country	Juror 1	Juror 2	Juror 3	Juror 4	Juror 5	Rank	Points	Rank	Points
01	Albania	9	7	1	5	1	1	12	1	12
02	Latvia	14	4	6	4	10	7	4	13	
03	Lithuania	15	12	3	15	15	14		6	5
04	Switzerland	11	6	15	10	7	13		15	
05	Slovenia	12	11	9	14	12	16		16	
06	Ukraine	6	13	7	7	6	8	3	2	10
07	Bulgaria	7	2	12	2	2	2	10	10	1
08	Netherlands	5	16	2	16	3	5	6	7	4
09	Moldova	1	3	5	9	14	4	7	5	6
10	Portugal	13	14	4	1	11	6	5	8	3
11	Croatia	2	1	14	13	4	3	8	11	
12	Denmark	4	10	11	6	13	12		12	
13	Austria	16	8	10	3	8	9	2	9	2
14	Iceland	8	9	13	12	16	15		14	
15	Greece									
16	Norway	3	15	16	11	5	10	1	4	7
17	Armenia	10	5	8	8	9	11		3	8

Detailed voting results from Greece (Final)
R/O	Country	Jury							Televote	
R/O	Country	Juror 1	Juror 2	Juror 3	Juror 4	Juror 5	Rank	Points	Rank	Points
01	Czech Republic	8	9	12	15	5	9	2	21	
02	Romania	4	7	8	9	4	4	7	9	2
03	Portugal	13	14	5	6	11	8	3	20	
04	Finland	24	21	23	23	17	24		11	
05	Switzerland	21	10	11	14	14	16		23	
06	France	23	6	21	11	15	13		10	1
07	Norway	11	15	17	22	10	19		5	6
08	Armenia	14	23	14	18	19	23		15	
09	Italy	5	5	19	19	21	10	1	4	7
10	Spain	19	19	1	17	7	6	5	1	12
11	Netherlands	6	16	16	7	6	7	4	12	
12	Ukraine	16	13	13	10	18	17		2	10
13	Germany	22	24	10	16	13	21		19	
14	Lithuania	17	12	18	20	12	22		16	
15	Azerbaijan	1	1	2	1	1	1	12	22	
16	Belgium	12	8	24	5	20	12		18	
17	Greece									
18	Iceland	9	11	15	12	23	14		24	
19	Moldova	3	4	9	8	16	5	6	8	3
20	Sweden	10	17	22	24	9	18		7	4
21	Australia	7	3	4	2	3	3	8	13	
22	United Kingdom	15	20	20	21	8	20		6	5
23	Poland	2	2	3	3	2	2	10	14	
24	Serbia	18	18	7	4	24	11		3	8
25	Estonia	20	22	6	13	22	15		17	
