= Tennfjord =

Village in Haram Municipality, Norway

- Village
- Interactive map of Tennfjord
- Location within Møre og Romsdal Location within Norway
- Coordinates: 62.5336°N 6.5896°E
- Country: Norway
- Region: Western Norway
- County: Møre og Romsdal
- District: Sunnmøre
- Municipality: Haram Municipality
- Elevation: 23 m (75 ft)
- Time zone: UTC+01:00 (CET)
  - Summer (DST): UTC+02:00 (CEST)
- Post Code: 6264 Tennfjord

Tennfjord is a village that is located at the end of the Grytafjorden in Haram Municipality in Møre og Romsdal county, Norway. The village of Tennfjord lies just south of the villages of Eidsvik and Vatne. Eidsvik lies in the northeastern part of the fjord valley, while Tennfjord lies to the south. Tennfjord is also located a short distance to the north of the village of Skodje, with the Skodje Bridge located 6 kilometres (3.7 mi) to the south. More than 900 inhabitants live in the Tennfjord area. The town has its own male voice choir: Tennfjord Mannskor.
