= What They Say =

2023 single by Victor Vernicos

Single by Victor Vernicos
- Language: English
- Released: 12 March 2023
- Length: 3:00
- Label: Panik
- Songwriter: Victor Vernicos Jorgensen

Victor Vernicos singles chronology
"Brutally Honest With You" (2022)	"What They Say" (2023)	"The 968 Paradox" (2023)

Music video
- "What They Say" on YouTube

Eurovision Song Contest 2023 entry
- Country: Greece
- Artist: Victor Vernicos
- Composer: Victor Vernicos Jorgensen
- Lyricist: Victor Vernicos Jorgensen

Finals performance
- Semi-final result: 13th
- Semi-final points: 14

Entry chronology
- ◄ "Die Together" (2022)
- "Zari" (2024) ►

Official performance video
- "What They Say" (Second Semi-Final) on YouTube

"What They Say" is a song by Greek singer Victor Vernicos, released on 12 March 2023. The song represented Greece in the Eurovision Song Contest 2023 after Vernicos was internally selected by the Hellenic Broadcasting Corporation (ERT), the Greek national broadcaster for the Eurovision Song Contest.

== Background ==
In an interview on Greek TV channel Skai TV, Vernicos reported that he had composed "What They Say" at the age of 14, producing the song by himself. Both Vernicos and his father reported that it was their favorite song Vernicos had written to this point, and he released the song as a potential candidate to represent Greece in the Eurovision Song Contest 2023. The song was written during the COVID-19 lockdown, with Vernicos stating that it was the first time he found himself in a state of stress.

In a press statement given out by Panik Records, the record company Vernicos is signed with and with whom he released the song with, the song is meant to celebrate younger generations "who dare to dream and create despite difficulties."

== Eurovision Song Contest ==
=== Internal selection ===
On 26 August 2022, ERT opened a submission period where artists and composers were able to submit their proposals for consideration by the broadcaster until 9 October 2022. Seven entries were then shortlisted by a seven-member artistic committee and were announced on 28 December 2022. The seven acts were then evaluated by a public committee consisting of a total of 70 members randomly selected from 2,982 applications based on five age groups: 25 members in the 18 to 24 category, 20 members in the 25 to 34 category, 15 members in the 35 to 44 category and 10 members in the over 45 category. On 19 January 2023, ERT shortlisted three final songs from the seven, which was the outcome of the public committee vote, followed by a respective evaluation by the artistic committee.

The combination of votes from the public committee (50.6%) and the artistic committee (49.4%) then selected the Greek entry. Vernicos earned 740 artistic committee votes and 509 public committee votes, earning a total of 1,249 votes, winning by a margin of 117 votes over second-place finisher Melissa Mantzoukis. As a result of winning, Vernicos was scheduled to represent Greece in the Eurovision Song Contest 2023.

=== At Eurovision ===
According to Eurovision rules, all nations with the exceptions of the host country and the "Big Five" (France, Germany, Italy, Spain and the United Kingdom) are required to qualify from one of two semi-finals in order to compete for the final; the top 10 countries from each semi-final progress to the final. The European Broadcasting Union (EBU) split up the competing countries into six different pots based on voting patterns from previous contests, with countries with favourable voting histories put into the same pot. On 31 January 2023, an allocation draw was held, which placed each country into one of the two semi-finals, and determined which half of the show they would perform in. Greece was placed into the second semi-final, held on 11 May 2023, and scheduled to perform in the first half of the show. Greece's song did not pass to the final.
