= Vatne, Møre og Romsdal =

Village in Haram Municipality, Norway

Vatne
- Village
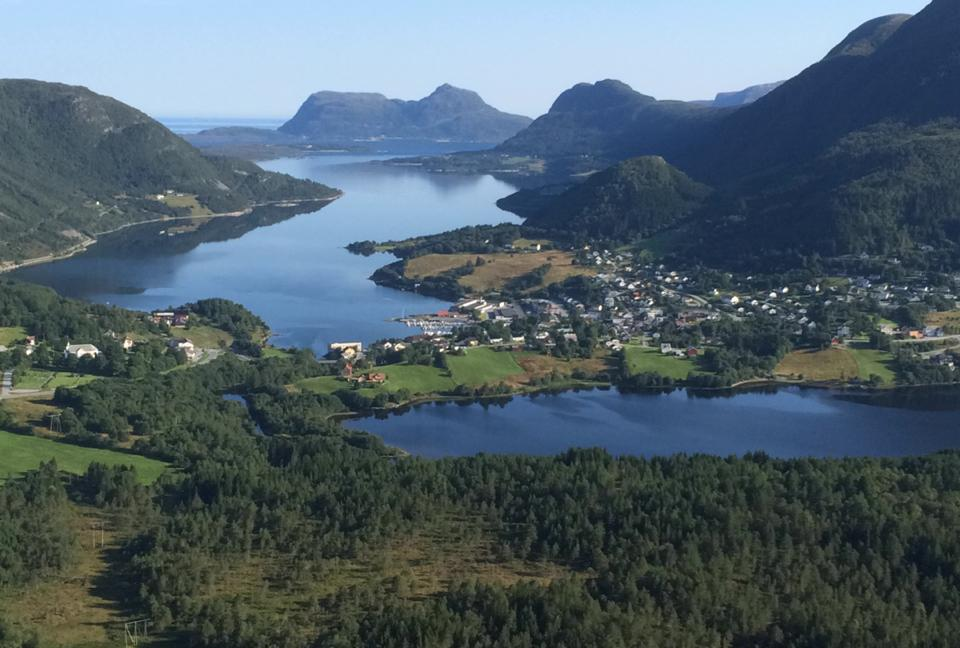
- View of the village
- Interactive map of Vatne
- Location within Møre og Romsdal Location within Norway
- Coordinates: 62.5583°N 6.6171°E
- Country: Norway
- Region: Western Norway
- County: Møre og Romsdal
- District: Sunnmøre
- Municipality: Haram Municipality

Area
  - Total: 1.8 km^{2} (0.69 sq mi)
- Elevation: 12 m (39 ft)

Population (2024)
  - Total: 2,439
  - Density: 1,355/km^{2} (3,510/sq mi)
- Time zone: UTC+01:00 (CET)
  - Summer (DST): UTC+02:00 (CEST)
- Post Code: 6265 Vatne

Vatne is a village in Haram Municipality in Møre og Romsdal county, Norway. The village of Vatne is located at the southern end of the Vatnefjorden in the eastern part of Haram Municipality. Other neighboring villages in the Vatne area include Eidsvik and Tennfjord to the south and Helle to the north of it.

The 1.8-square-kilometre (440-acre) village has a population (2024) of 2,439 and a population density of 1,355 inhabitants per square kilometre (3,510/sq mi).

The village of Vatne is the location of Vatne Church. The village was the administrative centre of the old Vatne Municipality which existed from 1902 until 1965.
