= Lock Me In =

2022 song by Circus Mircus

Single by Circus Mircus
- Language: English
- Released: 9 March 2022
- Length: 2:36
- Composer: Circus Mircus
- Lyricist: Circus Mircus

Music video
- "Lock Me In" on YouTube

Eurovision Song Contest 2022 entry
- Country: Georgia
- Artist: Circus Mircus
- Composer: Circus Mircus
- Lyricist: Circus Mircus

Finals performance
- Semi-final result: 18th
- Semi-final points: 22

Entry chronology
- ◄ "You" (2021)
- "Echo" (2023) ►

"Lock Me In" is a song by Georgian experimental rock band Circus Mircus. Released as a single on 9 March 2022, the song represented Georgia in the Eurovision Song Contest 2022 in Turin, Italy after being internally selected by Georgian Public Broadcasting (GPB), the Georgian broadcaster for the Eurovision Song Contest.

== Release ==
The song was released on 9 March 2022 on Circus Mircus' YouTube channel. While the music video for the song was also supposed to be released on the same day, it was postponed to 1 April due to the 2022 Russian invasion of Ukraine, with the band stating that "Due to the war in Ukraine, we feel that it is not the right time to release our happy and colourful music video. As per ESC guidelines, the submission deadline is near, so we decided to release only audio, while using the black background instead of the official music video footage, to express our share of solidarity towards our Ukrainian sisters and brothers.” The song was officially released to streaming services on 25 March.

== Eurovision Song Contest ==
=== Selection ===
On 20 September 2021, GPB confirmed their intention to take part in the Eurovision Song Contest 2022. On 11 November 2021, the broadcaster confirmed that they had carried out an internal selection in collaboration with music producers, choosing a group to represent them at the contest. On 14 November 2021, Circus Mircus were announced as the selected entrants.

=== At Eurovision ===
According to Eurovision rules, all nations with the exceptions of the host country and the "Big Five" (France, Germany, Italy, Spain and the United Kingdom) are required to qualify from one of two semi-finals in order to compete for the final; the top ten countries from each semi-final progress to the final. The European Broadcasting Union (EBU) split up the competing countries into six different pots based on voting patterns from previous contests, with countries with favourable voting histories put into the same pot. On 25 January 2022, an allocation draw was held which placed each country into one of the two semi-finals, as well as which half of the show they would perform in. Georgia was placed into the second semi-final, held on 12 May 2022, and performed fifth, in the first half of the show.
