= Die Together =

2022 song by Amanda Tenfjord

Single by Amanda Tenfjord

from the album In Hindsight
- Language: English
- Released: 10 March 2022
- Length: 2:56
- Label: Propeller Recordings
- Songwriters: Amanda Georgiadis Tenfjord; Bjørn Helge Gammelsæter

Amanda Tenfjord singles chronology
"Miss The Way You Missed Me" (2021)	"Die Together" (2022)	"Plans" (2022)

Music video
- "Die Together" on YouTube

Eurovision Song Contest 2022 entry
- Country: Greece
- Artist: Amanda Tenfjord
- As: Amanda Georgiadi Tenfjord
- Composers: Amanda Georgiadis Tenfjord; Bjørn Helge Gammelsæter
- Lyricists: Amanda Georgiadis Tenfjord; Bjørn Helge Gammelsæter

Finals performance
- Semi-final result: 3rd
- Semi-final points: 211
- Final result: 8th
- Final points: 215

Entry chronology
- ◄ "Last Dance" (2021)
- "What They Say" (2023) ►

Official performance video
- "Die Together (First Semi-Final) on YouTube "Die Together (Final) on YouTube

"Die Together" is a 2022 single by Greek-Norwegian singer Amanda Tenfjord. The song was officially released on 10 March 2022 on Hellenic Broadcasting Corporation's (ERT) show Studio 4. It represented Greece in the Eurovision Song Contest 2022 in Turin, Italy after being internally selected by the Hellenic Broadcasting Corporation. The song reached number two in Greece.

== Background ==
The song is about a dying relationship. However, in a last ditch effort, the singer wants to part their life along with their partner so that they could be with each other until the end of their lives.

== Release ==
The song was officially released on 10 March 2022 on Hellenic Broadcasting Corporation's (ERT) show Studio 4. However, a demo of the song was leaked in late February 2022.

== Eurovision Song Contest ==
=== Selection ===
On 7 September 2021, ERT opened a submission period where artists and composers were able to submit up to three songs each until 10 October 2021. Artists were required to be signed to record labels and to indicate the accompanying artistic group as well as the ideas or concept for the song promotion and presentation as part of their proposal.

A seven-member jury panel shortlisted five entrants in late October 2021, following this procedure: each member could pick between 5 and 10 entries, and the ones among these that obtained the majority of the preferences were selected to the following phase. The committee then proceeded to discuss with the acts the details of their potential participation at the ERT headquarters, planning to make their final decision by the end of December 2021. On 17 November 2021, Nancy Zampetoglou and Thanasis Anagnostopoulos announced the shortlisted acts on their ERT program Studio 4. These were: Good Job Nicky, Joanna Drigo, Ilias Kozas, Lou Is (stage name of Louiza Sofianopoulou) and Amanda Tenfjord.

The latter was ultimately announced as the selected entrant on 15 December 2021, with the entry revealed on 10 March 2022.

=== At Eurovision ===
According to Eurovision rules, all nations with the exceptions of the host country and the "Big Five" (France, Germany, Italy, Spain and the United Kingdom) are required to qualify from one of two semi-finals in order to compete for the final; the top ten countries from each semi-final progress to the final. The European Broadcasting Union (EBU) split up the competing countries into six different pots based on voting patterns from previous contests, with countries with favourable voting histories put into the same pot. On 25 January 2022, an allocation draw was held which placed each country into one of the two semi-finals, as well as which half of the show they would perform in. Greece was placed into the first semi-final, held on 10 May 2022, and performed in the second half of the show.

== Charts ==
Chart performance for "Die Together"
Chart (2022)	Peak position
Greece (IFPI)	2
Iceland (Tónlistinn)	29
Lithuania (AGATA)	19
Netherlands (Single Tip)	18
Sweden Heatseeker (Sverigetopplistan)	5
UK Singles Downloads (OCC)	67
