= The Voice Georgia =

- Also known as: Voice; New Georgian Voice; The Voice of Georgia
- Genre: Reality television
- Created by: John de Mol; Roel van Velzen
- Presented by: Duta Skhirtladze; Anna Imedashvili; Ruska Makashvili; Gvantsa Daraselia
- Judges: Dato Porchkhidze; Maia Darsmelidze; Merab Sepashvili; Nino Chkheidze; Stephane Mgebrishvili; Lela Tsurtsumia; Anri Jokhadze; Keti Topuria; Nodiko Tatishvili; Nutsa Shanshiashvili; Niaz Diasamidze; Nikoloz Rachveli; Salio; Sopo Toroshelidze; Dato Evgenidze
- Country of origin: Georgia
- Original language: Georgian
- No. of seasons: 5

Production
- Executive producers: Gvantsa Kilasonia; Davit Imedashvili
- Producers: Giorgi Imedashvili; Ekaterine Natsvlishvili
- Production location: Tbilisi
- Running time: 80−165 minutes
- Production companies: Talpa (2012-2016); ITV Studios (2021-present)

Original release
- Network: IMEDI TV (2012–2016); 1TV (2021–present)
- Release: October 4, 2012 – February 2, 2023
- Release: 2026

The Voice Sakartvelo (Georgian: The Voice საქართველო), known in English as The Voice Georgia, is a Georgian reality television show and singing competition broadcast on 1TV.

From seasons one through three, the show was called The Voice of Georgia (Georgian: ახალი ქართული ხმა, Akhali Kartuli Khma, lit. 'New Georgian Voice') and was broadcast on IMEDI TV. It is part of the international franchise The Voice based on the reality singing competition, The Voice of Holland, launched in the Netherlands, created by Dutch television producer John de Mol.

The show's critical determination is the contestants' singing quality. Three or four coaches, themselves popular performing artists, composers, and producers, train talents in their team and occasionally perform with them. Talents are selected in blind auditions, where the coaches cannot see, but only hear the auditioner.

== History ==
The first season kicked off on 4 October 2012 and finished on 13 January 2013. The winner of the first season was Salome Katamadze with 48.6% of the votes. She was awarded a trip to Los Angeles, California to record a single at Universal Music Studio.

In 2013, IMEDI TV produced a kids' version of the show titled Akhali Sabavsho Khma (Georgian: ახალი საბავშო ხმა, lit. 'New Kids' Voice'). The coaches were Dato Porchkhidze, Eka Kakhiani, and Stephane Mgebrishvili, with Samory Balde and Ruska Makashvili as the presenters.

Starting in 2021, the show was rebooted by the Georgian Public Broadcaster for the channel 1TV. It was used to select the Georgian representative for the Eurovision Song Contest 2023.

== Format ==
The show consists of three phases: blind auditions, battles phase, and live performance shows. Four coaches, all noteworthy recording artists, choose teams of contestants through a blind audition process. Each coach has the length of the auditioner's performance (about one minute and a half) to decide if they want that performer on their team; if two or more coaches want the same performer (as happens frequently), the performer has the final choice of which coach's team to join.

After each coach fills every slot in their team, the batch of singers in the team is mentored and developed by their respective coach. In the second stage, called the battles phase, coaches have to pair their team members to battle against each other directly by singing the same song together on a stage that looks like a battle ring. The coach chooses the winner of each battle, who goes into the first live round.

Within the live shows, the surviving acts from each team compete head-to-head, with the public vote determining who will advance to the next episode. Finally, between the remaining acts, the coach chooses one to advance. In the finale, the outcome is decided solely by public vote.

== Coaches and presenters ==
=== Coaches' timeline ===
K	Coach	Seasons				
K	Coach	1	2	3	4	5
	Stephane Mgebrishvili					
	Dato Porchkhidze					
	Maia Darsmelidze					
	Nino Chkheidze					
	Merab Sepashvili					
	Lela Tsurtsumia					
	Anri Jokhadze					
	Keti Topuria					
	Nodiko Tatishvili					
	Nutsa Shanshiashvili					
	Niaz Diasamidze					
	Salio					
	Nikoloz Rachveli					
	Sopo Toroshelidze					
	Dato Evgenidze					

=== Presenters' timeline ===
Presenter	Seasons				
Presenter	1	2	3	4	5
Anna Imedashvili					
Duta Skhirtladze					
Ruska Makashvili					
Gvantsa Daraselia					

== Series overview ==
Warning: the following table presents a significant amount of different colors.

The Voice Sakartvelo series overview
Season	Aired	Winner	Finalists			Winning coach	Presenter(s)		Coaches (chairs' order)			
Season	Aired	Winner	Finalists			Winning coach	Presenter(s)		1	2	3	4
1	2012-13	Salome Katamadze	Nini Tsnobiladze	Sandro Kadagidze	Tika Jamburia	Dato Porchkhidze	Anna Imedashvili, Duta Skhirtladze		Merab	Nino	Stephane & Maia	Dato
2	2013-14	Mariam Chachkhiani	Nika Lazariashvili	Tamar Jgushia	Tiko Mosemghvdlishvili	Dato Porchkhidze	Anna Imedashvili, Duta Skhirtladze		Lela	Stephane	Maia	Dato
3	2015-16	Giorgi Nadibaidze	Salome Dolidze	Shotiko Tatishvili	Vano Turabelidze	Keti Topuria	Anna Imedashvili, Duta Skhirtladze		Nutsa	Anri	Keti	Nodiko
4	2021	Magda Ivanishvili	seven runner-ups			Stephane Mgebrishvili	Anna Imedashvili, Duta Skhirtladze	Ruska Makashvili	Niaz	Salio	Stephane	Nika
5	2022-23	Iru Khechanovi	seven finalists			Dato Porchkhidze	Anna Imedashvili, Duta Skhirtladze	Gvantsa Daraselia	Dato	Evgena	Sopo	Stephane
6	2026-2027	Upcoming season					Anna Imedashvili, Duta Skhirtladze	Gvantsa Daraselia	Dato	Stephane	Sopo	Giorgi

== Seasons synopsis ==
Teams color key
Winner	Seventh place
Runner-up	Eighth place
Third place	Eliminated in the Live Shows
Fourth place	Stolen in the Battles
Fifth place	Eliminated in the Battles
Sixth place	Withdrew

=== Season 1 (2012–2013) ===
The first season of The Voice of Georgia started on 4 October 2012 and it was hosted by Duta Skhirtladze and Anna Imedashvili. There were six episodes of Blind auditions, four episodes of Battles, and six Live shows.

Coaching teams
Coaches	Teams throughout the season's live shows						
Merab Sepashvili							
Merab Sepashvili	Sandro Kadagidze	Veriko Matsaberidze	Keti Kvitsaridze	Tedo Qoridze	Ani Asatiani	Giorgi Chikovani	Sofo Papuashvili
Nino Chkheidze							
Nino Chkheidze	Tika Jamburia	Levan Gvazava	Irina Bairamashvili	Ia Tomashi	Giorgi Modzmanashvili	Sopo Sazhiniani	David Gabidzashvili
Stephane & Maia							
Stephane & Maia	Nini Tsnobiladze	Magda Vasadze	Ioane Arabuli	Mariam Sharmanashvili	Tika Iremashvili	David Eradze	Sopo Ninoshvili
Dato Porchkhidze							
Dato Porchkhidze	Salome Katamadze	Lasha Topuria	Irakli & Tornike Gulashvili	Mako Kvitaishvili	Nini Bregvadze	Aleko Cercvadze	Nadin Zakharian-Lucenko

=== Season 2 (2013–2014) ===
The auditions for The Voice of Georgia season two began in the summer of 2013, right after the end of Akhali Sabavsho Khma (the kids' version). Season two started in October 2013, in Imedi TV. The coaches were Dato Porchkhidze, Lela Tsurtsumia, Maia Darsmelidze, and Stephane. The winner of the season was Mariam Chachkhiani from Team Dato.

=== Season 3 (2015–2016) ===
The auditions for season three began in the summer of 2015. Season three kicked off on Imedi TV in October 2015.

=== Season 4 (2021) ===
In 2020, a reboot of the series was announced and produced for the channel 1TV. The fourth season features returning coach Stephane Mgebrishvili and debutants Niaz Diasamidze, Salome Korkotashvili – better known as Salio – and Nikoloz Rachveli (addressed on the show as Nika). The Voice Kids host Ruska Makashvili returns as the presenter of the show. Recordings of the Blind auditions began on 31 January 2021, and the first episode aired on 20 February 2021.

Coaching teams
Coaches	Top 40 Artists					
Niaz Diasamidze						
Niaz Diasamidze	Khatia Kinkladze	Luka Liluashvili	Ani Tabaghua	Salome Khujadze	Meri Kedelidze	Giorgi Petriashvili
Niaz Diasamidze	~~Kato Verkhviashvili~~	Tako Ananikiani	Mariam Sergia	Ani Chkheidze	Luka Chakvetadze	
Salio						
Salio	Ana Morgoshia	Salome Tatarashvili	Lizi Gozalishvili	Mariam Iakashvili	Giorgi Tsiskadze	Sandro Lashkhi
Salio	~~Tekla Tsverikmazashvili~~	Tazo Garsidze	Tamar Liluashvili	Ninuca Gelashvili	Salome Tsintsadze	
Stephane Mgebrishvili						
Stephane Mgebrishvili	Magda Ivanishvili	Tekla Tsverikmazashvili	Ikako Aleqsidze	Mariam Shengelia	Liza Kikacheishvili	Mariam Dokvadze
Stephane Mgebrishvili	~~Giorgi Tsiskadze~~	Salome Mirianashvili	Luka Niavadze	Merabiko Dolidze	Anka Tatarashvili	
Nikoloz Rachveli						
Nikoloz Rachveli	Violeta Mgaloblishvili	Marita Tsetskhladze	Kato Verkhviashvili	Natia Nanobashvili	Jeko Gogitidze	Lenka Zviadadze
Nikoloz Rachveli	~~Salome Khujadze~~	Giorgi Rukhaia	Anna Jalabadze	Nini Malkhazishvili	Anano Sidamonidze	
Note: Italicized names are stolen artists (names struck through within former teams).

=== Season 5 (2022–2023) ===
Broadcaster GPB announced the opening of applications for The Voice Sakartvelo season five on 23 August 2022, which would close on 20 September. With this announcement, the channel also revealed that the competition would be used to choose the Georgian representative for the Eurovision Song Contest 2023.

For the coaching panel, Stephane Mgebrishvili was the only coach returning from the previous season and Dato Porchkhidze returned after a two-season hiatus. Meanwhile, Sopo Toroshelidze and Dato Evgenidze debuted as coaches, and Gvantsa Daraselia debuted as the show's presenter. The season premiered on 8 December 2022.

Coaching teams
Coaches	Top 32 Artists				
Dato Porchkhidze					
Dato Porchkhidze	Iru Khechanovi	Tako Kakalashvili	Erekle Turkadze	Tsotne Barbakadze	Ekaterine Mdivani
Dato Porchkhidze	Irakli Kapanadze	~~Ani Nozadze~~	~~Nini Asiliani~~	~~Kakha Aslamazashvili~~	Koka Davitadze
Dato Evgenidze					
Dato Evgenidze	Giorgi Datiashvili	Kakha Aslamazashvili	Allegro	Giorgi Putkaradze	Gvantsa Kupatadze
Dato Evgenidze	Ani Nozadze	~~Ekaterine Mdivani~~	Mariam Buighlishvili	Salome Takaishvili	Sopo Garakanidze
Sopo Toroshelidze					
Sopo Toroshelidze	Lika Siradze	Tina Datikashvili	Mariam Toronjadze	Salome Tsintsadze	Ana Vashakmadze
Sopo Toroshelidze	Sopo Batilashvili	~~Mariam Kokeladze~~	~~Tako Kakalashvili~~	Anika Gabiskiria	Anri Bolkvadze
Stephane Mgebrishvili					
Stephane Mgebrishvili	Likuna Tutisani	Anka Tatarashvili	Dato Rusadze	Saba Chachua	Mariam Kokeladze
Stephane Mgebrishvili	Nini Asiliani	~~Ana Vashakmadze~~	~~Mariam Toronjadze~~	Aliona Tsintsadze	Luka Niavadze
Note: Italicized names are stolen artists (names struck through within former teams).

== Kids' version ==
Akhali Sabavsho Khma (lit. 'New Kids' Voice') aired from April 2013 until June 2013 on IMEDI TV. The hosts were Samory Balde and Ruska Makashvili and the coaches were Eka Kakhiani, Dato Porchkhidze, and Stephane Mgebrishvili.

Akhali Sabavsho Khma series overview
Season	First aired	Last aired	Winner	Other finalists					Winning coach	Presenters	Coaches (chairs' order)		
Season	First aired	Last aired	Winner	Other finalists					Winning coach	Presenters	1	2	3
1	April 2013	June 2013	Reziko Didebashvili	Giorgi Gigashvili	Giorgi Vardania	Ledi Daliashvili	Liza Yenia	Rati Mezvrishvili	Dato Porchkhidze	Samory Balde, Ruska Makashvili	Stephane	Eka	Dato
