= San Marino in the Eurovision Song Contest 2023 =

- Eurovision Song Contest 2023
- Participating broadcaster: San Marino RTV (SMRTV)
- Country: San Marino
- Selection process: Una voce per San Marino 2023
- Selection date: 25 February 2023

Competing entry
- Song: "Like an Animal"
- Artist: Piqued Jacks
- Songwriters: Andrea Lazzeretti; Francesco Bini; Marco Sgaramella; Tommaso Oliveri

Placement
- Semi-final result: Failed to qualify (16th)

Participation chronology

San Marino was represented at the Eurovision Song Contest 2023 with the song "Like an Animal" performed by Piqued Jacks. The Sammarinese broadcaster San Marino RTV (SMRTV) organised the national final concept entitled Una voce per San Marino ("A voice for San Marino") to decide their representative. The event consisted of over 1,000 emerging and 32 established artists competing over a five-month period from October 2022 through February 2023 for the opportunity to represent the nation at the contest. The winning entry "Like an Animal" was written by Andrea Lazzeretti, Francesco Bini, Marco Sgaramella, and Tommaso Oliveri.

Promotion of the entry consisted of the release of a music video as well as a tour of a selection of nations participating in the contest, including England, Israel, Poland, Spain, and the Netherlands. San Marino was drawn to compete in the second semi-final of the contest, which took place on 11 May 2023. Performing during the show at position 12 in the running order, "Like an Animal" did not qualify to compete in the final. It placed last out of the 16 participating countries in its semi-final, with no points awarded to the nation for the first time in its Eurovision history.

== Background ==
Prior to the 2023 contest, San Marino had participated in the Eurovision Song Contest 12 times since its first entry in 2008. The nation's debut entry in the 2008 contest, "Complice" performed by Miodio, failed to qualify for the final and placed last in the semi-final it competed in. San Marino subsequently did not participate in both the 2009 and 2010 contests, citing financial difficulties. It returned in 2011 with Italian singer Senit performing "Stand By", which also failed to take the nation to the final. From 2012 to 2014, San Marino sent Valentina Monetta to the contest on three consecutive occasions. Monetta's first two entries failed to qualify San Marino to the final, however in 2014, she managed to bring the nation to the final for the first time with "Maybe", which eventually placed 24th. Following four consecutive non-qualifying years, San Marino qualified for the final for its second time in the Eurovision Song Contest 2019, where Serhat represented the nation for his second time and finished in 19th place with "Say Na Na Na". For the 2020 contest, Senhit and her song "Freaky!" were to represent the nation, though following its cancellation as a result of the COVID-19 pandemic, San Marino re-selected Senhit for 2021. Her 2021 song, "Adrenalina", which she performed alongside American rapper Flo Rida, qualified for the final, eventually placing 22nd out of the 26 entries. For the 2022 contest, a competition titled Una voce per San Marino ("A voice for San Marino") was held to select the country's entry. Its selected entrant Achille Lauro and the song "Stripper" failed to qualify for the final. In February 2022, SMRTV confirmed the return of the selection event for the 2023 contest.

== Before Eurovision ==
=== Una voce per San Marino ===
Una voce per San Marino returned for a second edition to select the Sammarinese entry for the Eurovision Song Contest. This marked the third time that the nation had opted to select their entry with a national final format, the first time being in 2018 with 1in360.

Auditions for Una voce per San Marino were held between October 2022 and February 2023. Interested artists could apply to partake in the event through the official Una voce per San Marino website. There were no restrictions on the nationality of the performer nor the language of the song, though all artists and songs had to comply with the rules of the Eurovision Song Contest as set by the European Broadcasting Union (EBU). Artists who proceeded to the next round attended an academy in the Teatro Titano in the City of San Marino from 28 October 2022 and 16 February 2023, acting as preliminary castings. From 20 to 24 February 2023, a series of semi-finals decided the 22 acts that moved on to the final. Established artists were directly invited to the semi-final stage by Media Evolution SRL. As the end of the auditions period approached, a special in-depth show, narrated by Maria Letizia Camparsi and focused on introducing and recapping Una voce per San Marino, was aired on RTV on 24 January 2023.

==== Emerging acts auditions ====
A submission period was opened by SMRTV on 20 August 2022 for emerging artists and composers to submit their entries. By 14 October 2022, the broadcaster announced it had received over 400 applications, particularly from Spain, Germany and Norway, but also from other European countries, Canada, the United States and Australia. Near the close of the submission period, SMRTV reported that they had received over 1,000 applications overall from 31 different countries, out of which 299 were selected to take part in the emerging acts round. The emerging acts auditions took place during scheduled dates between 28 October 2022 and 27 January 2023.

As the only Sammarinese acts in the selection, Kida and Simone De Biagi were granted a direct pass to the final. The 104 international emerging acts, including both auditionees and established artists who got automatic passes to participate in the semi-finals following their auditions, and their country of origin were as follows:

Emerging artists

- Acousticouple (Italy)
- Alabaster (Italy)
- Andry (Italy)
- Angel Dell (Finland)
- Aria (Italy)
- Aristea (Italy)
- Atwood (Italy)
- Blonde Brothers (Italy)
- Brandon Parasole (Spain)
- Camilla (Italy)
- Christina (Italy)
- Christopher (Germany)
- Con Amore (United Kingdom)
- Daniel Schuhmacher (Germany)
- Daudia (Italy)
- DƏVA (Italy)
- Dionysian (Italy)
- E.E.F. (Italy)
- Edoardo Brogi (Italy)
- Eleonora Alì (Italy)
- Ellynora (Italy)
- Erna Hrönn (Iceland)
- Florin Răduță (Belgium)
- Francesca Monte and Kevan (Italy)
- Francesco Balasso (Italy)
- Francesco Da Vinci (Italy)
- FreakyBea (Italy)
- Gelida (Italy)
- Gisele Abramoff (Germany)
- Ice Eye (Finland)
- Ilenya (Italy)
- Iole (Italy)
- Jenny & Me (Switzerland)
- Jenny May (Latvia)
- Kiara D.V. feat. Pamela Ivonne Cole (United Kingdom)
- Leonor (Italy)
- Lodia (Italy)
- Lola (Croatia)
- Lost City feat Emerique (Italy)
- Luca Minnelli (Italy)
- Luciano Carlino (Italy)
- Luna Palumbo (Italy)
- Morgana (Italy)
- Nevruz (Italy)
- Nicole Hammett (Malta)
- Noe (Italy)
- Norah (Italy)
- Only Sara (Italy)
- Ophelio (Italy)
- Out Offline (Italy)
- Piqued Jacks (Italy)
- Pjero (Italy)
- Raim (Italy)
- Ruggero Ricci (Italy)
- Santo (Italy)
- Sara (Italy)
- Silver (Italy)
- Sophia (Italy)
- Surama Tsu (Italy)
- TES – Tutti Esageratamente Stronzi (Italy)
- Tothem (Italy)
- Veronica Howle (Italy)
- Verónica Romero (Spain)
- Vian (Italy)
- Victor Arbelo (Spain)
- Vina Rose (United Kingdom)
- Viviana (Italy)
- Viviana Milioti (Germany)
- Xada (Italy)
- XGiove (Italy)

Established artists

- Alessandro Coli (Italy)
- Alfie Arcuri (Australia)
- Camille Cabaltera (Italy)
- Ciro De Luca (Romania)
- Deborah Iurato (Italy)
- Deshedus (Italy)
- Dramalove (United Kingdom)
- Eiffel 65 (Italy)
- Ferrán Faba (Spain)
- Flexx (Italy)
- Francesco Monte (Italy)
- Ginny Vee (Italy)
- Kurt Cassar (Malta)
- Laïoung feat. Marzio (Italy)
- Le Deva (Italy)
- Lorenzo Licitra (Italy)
- Manuel Aspidi (Italy)
- Massimo Di Cataldo and Andrea Agresti (Italy)
- Mate (Italy)
- Matilde (Italy)
- Mayu (Switzerland)
- MeriCler (Italy)
- Moreno (Italy)
- Neja and Luca Guadagnini Band (Italy)
- Rawstrings (Italy)
- Ronela (Albania)
- Rouges (Italy)
- Roy Paci (Italy)
- Selina Albright (United States)
- Sofia Mae (Italy)
- Stefano d'Orazio (Italy)
- Thomas (Italy)

==== Semi-finals ====
On 20 February 2023, SMRTV announced the names of the 106 acts that had been selected to progress to the semi-final stage. In each semi-final, four artists advanced immediately to the final. A further four artists in each semi-final were chosen to advance to the second chance round. In total, 22 acts were to compete in the final: 16 artists chosen from the semi-finals, four from the second chance round, and the two Sammarinese artists that had automatically advanced to the final. All of these events took place at the Teatro Nuovo in Dogana.

Key: Finalist Second chance Absent

Semi-final 1 – 20 February 2023
R/O	Artist	Song	Result
1	Acousticouple	"Hell Rider"	Eliminated
2	Alfie Arcuri	"Collide"	Finalist
3	Alabaster	"Ambrosia"	Eliminated
4	Andry	"Superboom"	Eliminated
5	Alessandro Coli	"Afterglow"	Eliminated
6	Angel Dell	"Hard to Be an Angel"	Eliminated
7	Aria	"Una"	Eliminated
8	Aristea	"Dentro una bolla"	Eliminated
9	Atwood	"Dangerous"	Eliminated
10	Blonde Brothers	"Da che parte stai"	Eliminated
11	Brandon Parasole	"Affare"	Eliminated
12	Camilla	"It's Not You, It's Me"	Second chance
13	Camille Cabaltera	"Mental"	Second chance
14	Christina	"Complicated"	Eliminated
15	Christopher Grev	"Stars in the Sky"	Eliminated
16	Ciro De Luca	"L'amore universale"	Eliminated
17	Con Amore	"Perfect Sight"	Eliminated
18	Daniel Schuhmacher	"Skin I'm In"	Eliminated
19	Daudia	"What If"	Second chance
20	Deborah Iurato	"Out of Space"	Finalist
21	Deshedus	"Non basterà"	Finalist
22	Dəva	"Malaise"	Eliminated
23	Dionysian	"Steps of the Way"	Eliminated
24	DramaLove	"Thunder"	Eliminated
25	E.E.F.	"Something for You"	Finalist
26	Edoardo Brogi	"Due punti sull'equatore"	Second chance

Semi-final 2 – 21 February 2023
R/O	Artist	Song	Result
1	Eiffel 65	"Movie Star"	Finalist
2	Eleonora Alì	"Fade Out"	Eliminated
3	Ellynora	"Mama Told Me"	Finalist
4	Erna Hrönn	"Your Voice"	Eliminated
5	Ferrán Faba	"Cita en el Metaverso"	Eliminated
6	Leonor	"Una parola sola"	Eliminated
7	Flexx	"GOK (God Only Knows)"	Second chance
8	Florin Răduță	"My Mind"	Second chance
9	Francesca Monte and Kevan	"Holding on to You"	Eliminated
10	Francesco Balasso	"Chi sono"	Eliminated
11	Francesco Da Vinci	"Prumess"	Eliminated
12	Francesco Monte	"Eklissi"	Eliminated
13	FreakyBea	"Fiori"	Eliminated
14	Gelida	"Frena"	Eliminated
15	Ginny Vee	"Haunted"	Eliminated
16	Gisele Abramoff	"Playlist"	Eliminated
17	Ice Eye	"Raging Storm"	Eliminated
18	Ilenya	"Japan"	Eliminated
19	Iole	"Sul tetto del mondo"	Finalist
20	Jenny & Me	"Portami nel cuore"	Eliminated
21	Jenny May	"When the World Awakens"	Eliminated
22	Kiara D.V. feat. Pamela Ivonne Cole	"My Time"	Second chance
23	Kurt Cassar	"Hurdles"	Eliminated
24	La Bebae	"Tocco il fondo"	Second chance
25	Laïoung feat. Marzio	"12 Hours"	Eliminated
26	Le Deva	"Fiori su Marte"	Finalist
27	Lodia	"Fine del mondo"	Eliminated

Semi-final 3 – 22 February 2023
R/O	Artist	Song	Result
1	Lola	"Imperio"	Eliminated
2	Lorenza Rocchiccioli	"I Am Worthy"	Eliminated
3	Lorenzo Licitra	"Never Give Up"	Finalist
4	Lost City feat. Emerique	"Titan"	Second chance
5	Luca Minnelli	"Lucky Love"	Eliminated
6	Luciano Carlino	"Hiroshima's Dreams"	Eliminated
7	Luna Palumbo	"Batticuore"	Second chance
8	Manuel Aspidi	"Fading Out the Silence"	Eliminated
9	Massimo Di Cataldo and Andrea Agresti	"Una canzone brutta"	Eliminated
10	Mate	"Prisma"	Second chance
11	Matilde	"Come fanno i gatti"	Eliminated
12	Mayu	"C'è qualcosa in me che non fuziona"	Finalist
13	MeriCler	"Souvenirs"	Eliminated
14	Moreno	"Vieni via con me"	Eliminated
15	Morgana	"A Lonely Night in Shanghai"	Second chance
16	Neja and Luca Guadagnini Band	"Questione di fortuna"	Eliminated
17	Nevruz	"L'alieno"	Finalist
18	Nicole Hammett	"Giochi strategici"	Eliminated
19	Noe	"Sottosopra"	Eliminated
20	Only Sara	"Bleach"	Eliminated
21	Ophelio	"Rubber"	Eliminated
22	Out Offline	"Endless Loop"	Eliminated
23	Piqued Jacks	"Like an Animal"	Finalist
—N/a	~~Norah~~	—	Absent

Semi-final 4 – 23 February 2023
R/O	Artist	Song	Result
1	Pjero	"Spiderman"	Second chance
2	Raim	"All Alone"	Second chance
3	Rawstrings	"Pardonne-moi mon enfant"	Eliminated
4	Ronela	"Salvaje"	Second chance
5	Rouges	"All'alba del mio amore"	Eliminated
6	Roy Paci	"Tromba"	Second chance
7	Ruggero Ricci	"Firework"	Eliminated
8	Santo	"Torna presto"	Eliminated
9	Sara	"Tutto bene"	Eliminated
10	Selina Albright	"Did I Ever"	Eliminated
11	Silver	"Get You Back"	Eliminated
12	Sofia Mae	"Dentro questa musica"	Eliminated
13	Sophia	"Skybreaker"	Eliminated
14	Stefano d'Orazio	"Si fa così"	Eliminated
15	Surama Tsu	"Tre tavole"	Eliminated
16	TES – Tutti Esageratamente Stronzi	"Giovani di mezza età"	Eliminated
17	Thomas	"23:23"	Finalist
18	Tothem	"Sacro e profano"	Finalist
19	Veronica Howle	"Che"	Eliminated
20	Verónica Romero	"Army of One"	Eliminated
21	Vian	"Wicca"	Eliminated
22	Vina Rose	"Oblivious"	Finalist
23	Viviana	"Prigioniera nera"	Eliminated
24	Viviana Milioti	"Seraphina's Lullaby"	Eliminated
25	Xada	"Come nei film"	Eliminated
26	XGiove	"Fuoco e benzina"	Finalist
—N/a	~~Victor Arbelo~~	—	Absent

==== Second chance ====
Before the second chance round, Pjero was initially confirmed among the contestants with the song "Spiderman", but he was later disqualified from the competition as his song had already been released two years earlier on digital platforms, in conflict with the contest rules. Selina Albright was initially selected as an alternate, but dropped out due to logistical reasons; thus, TES – Tutti Esageratamente Stronzi were subsequently selected to compete.

Key: Finalist Absent

Second chance round – 24 February 2023
R/O	Artist	Song	Result
1	Camilla	"It's Not You, It's Me"	Eliminated
2	Camille Cabaltera	"Mental"	Eliminated
3	Daudia	"What If"	Eliminated
4	Edoardo Brogi	"Due punti sull'equatore"	Finalist
5	Flexx	"GOK (God Only Knows)"	Eliminated
6	Florin Raduța	"My Mind"	Eliminated
7	Kiara D.V. feat. Pamela Ivonne Cole	"My Time"	Eliminated
8	La Bebae	"Tocco il fondo"	Eliminated
9	Lost City feat. Emerique	"Titan"	Eliminated
10	Luna Palumbo	"Batticuore"	Eliminated
11	Mate	"Prisma"	Finalist
12	Morgana	"A Lonely Night in Shanghai"	Eliminated
13	Raim	"All Alone"	Eliminated
14	Ronela	"Salvaje"	Finalist
15	Roy Paci	"Tromba"	Finalist
16	TES – Tutti Esageratamente Stronzi	"Giovani di mezza età"	Eliminated
—N/a	~~Pjero~~	~~"Spiderman"~~	Disqualified

==== Final ====
The final took place on 25 February 2023 and was hosted by Jonathan Kashanian and Senhit. Twenty-two participants were scheduled to take part, however Simone De Biagi withdrew himself from consideration due to throat issues. Interval acts included 2022's Sammarinese entrant Achille Lauro and 2008's Miodio, who marked 15 years since their performance for the nation's Eurovision debut. At the end of the event, Piqued Jacks were declared the winners with their song "Like an Animal". The result was determined by a six-member jury panel consisting of Al Bano (jury president and Italy's 1976 and 1985 Eurovision entrant), Charlotte Davis (British television producer), Steve Lyon (British sound engineer), Clarissa Martinelli (journalist), Antonio Rospini (musician and artistic consultant), and Dino Steward (managing director of BMG Italy). Only the placements of the top 10 acts were revealed. The band Piqued Jacks consisted of Francesco Bini (bass), Andrea Lazzeretti (vocals), Tommaso Olivieri (drums), and Marco Sgaramella (guitar).

Key: Winner Absent

Final – 25 February 2023
R/O	Artist	Song	Place
1	Roy Paci	"Tromba"	–
2	Vina Rose	"Oblivious"	10
3	Deshedus	"Non basterà"	–
4	Kida	"Stessa pelle"	–
5	Thomas	"23:23"	–
6	Piqued Jacks	"Like an Animal"	1
7	E.E.F.	"Something for You"	9
8	Iole	"Sul tetto del mondo"	–
9	Deborah Iurato	"Out of Space"	–
10	Nevruz	"L'alieno"	–
11	Eiffel 65	"Movie Star"	5
12	Le Deva	"Fiori su Marte"	2
13	Mayu	"C'è qualcosa in me che non fuziona"	4
14	Lorenzo Licitra	"Never Give Up"	–
15	Mate	"Prisma"	–
16	Tothem	"Sacro e profano"	8
17	Edoardo Brogi	"Due punti sull'equatore"	6
18	Ellynora	"Mama Told Me"	7
19	Alfie Arcuri	"Collide"	–
20	Ronela	"Salvaje"	–
21	XGiove	"Fuoco e benzina"	3
—N/a	~~Simone De Biagi~~	~~"Catching Memories"~~	—

=== Promotion ===
"Like an Animal" was the last of 2023's Eurovision entries to be released to streaming services, with only live versions being available until its studio version release on 5 April. A music video of the song was later released on 27 April and featured the group dressed in 90s-inspired outfits with "flashmob-style choreography".

Piqued Jacks' first live performance of "Like an Animal" following their selection took place on 25 March at an event held in Barcelona at the Palau Sant Jordi. The occasion included past and present Eurovision winners and participants. Other promotional appearances took place in London, Tel Aviv, Madrid, Amsterdam, and Warsaw, the latter of which Piqued Jacks were joined by previous San Marino representative Senhit. The group also appeared in print media, having been interviewed about their participation and Eurovision journey by the Italian edition of Rolling Stone.

== At Eurovision ==
The Eurovision Song Contest 2023 took place at the Liverpool Arena in Liverpool, United Kingdom, and consisted of two semi-finals held on the respective dates of 9 and 11 May and the final on 13 May 2023. According to the Eurovision rules, all participating countries, except the host nation and the "Big Five", consisting of France, Germany, Italy, Spain and the United Kingdom, were required to qualify from one of two semi-finals to compete for the final; the top 10 countries from their respective semi-finals progressed to the final. The European Broadcasting Union (EBU) split up the competing countries into five different pots based on voting patterns from previous contests, with countries with favourable voting histories put into the same pot. On 31 January 2023, an allocation draw was held which placed each country into one of the two semi-finals, and determined which half of the show they would perform in. San Marino was placed into the 11 May second semi-final, and was scheduled to perform in the second half of the show. Once all the competing songs for the 2023 contest had been released, the running order for the semi-finals was decided by the producers of the contest to prevent similar songs from being placed next to each other. San Marino was set to perform in position 12, following the entry from Georgia and before the entry from Austria. In San Marino, the two semi-finals and the final were broadcast on San Marino RTV and Radio San Marino with commentary by Lia Fiorio and Gigi Restivo.

=== Performances ===
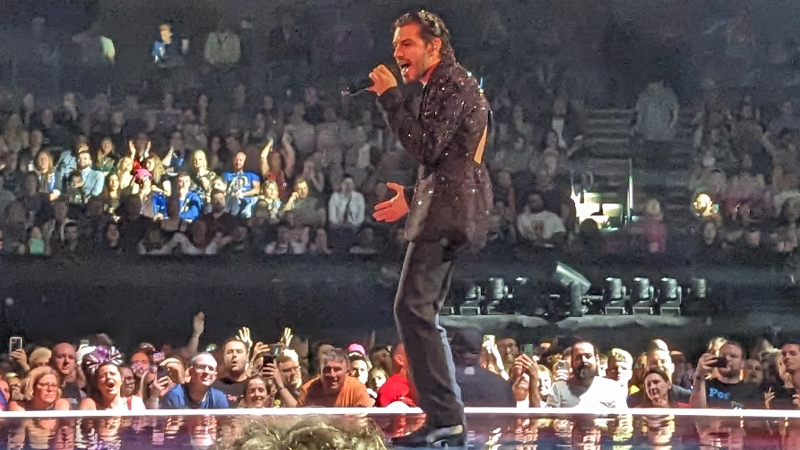
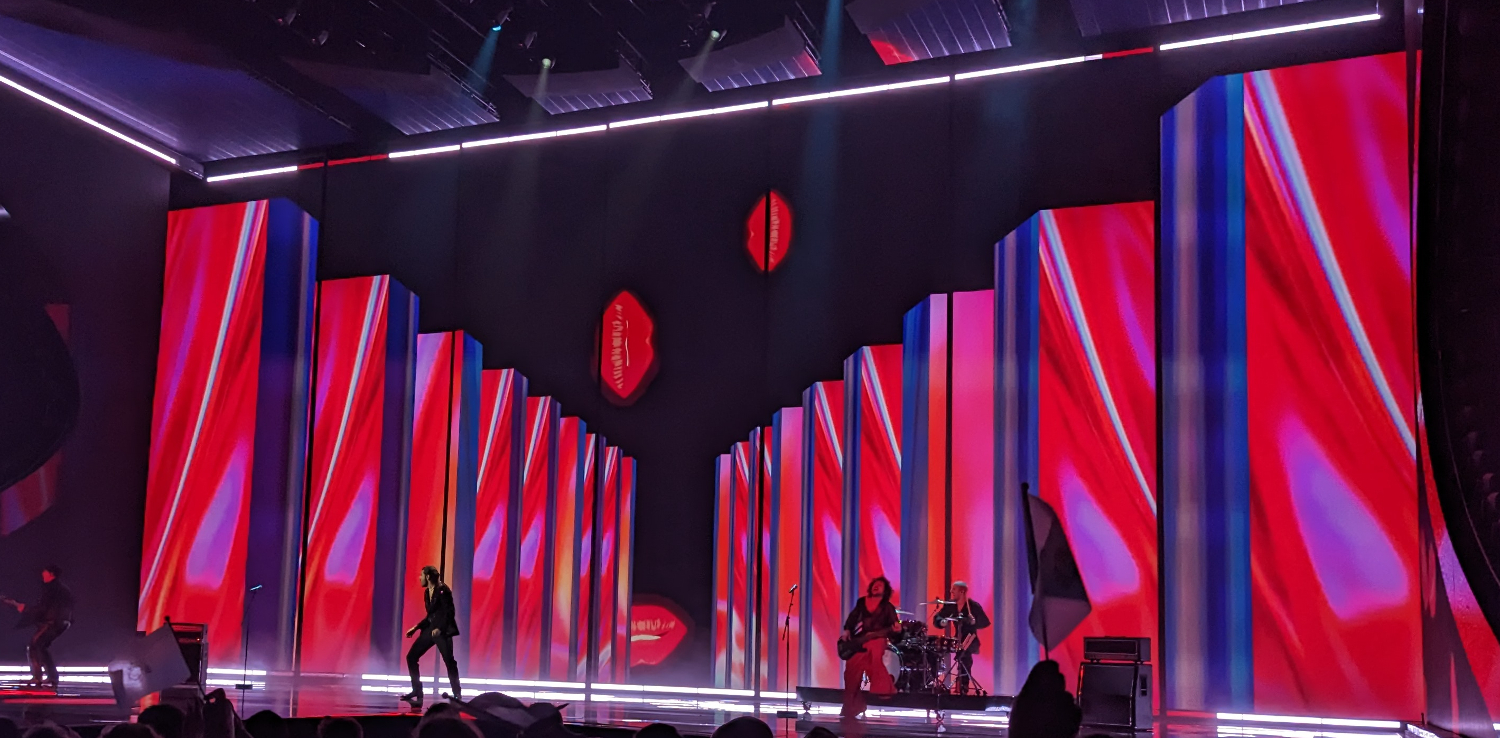
Piqued Jacks performing in Liverpool during a dress rehearsal for the second semi-final.

Piqued Jacks took part in technical rehearsals in Liverpool on 2 and 5 May, and dress rehearsals on 10 May. The latter included the jury show where the professional back-up juries of each country watched and voted in a result used if any issues with public televoting occurred. Greek creative director, choreographer and dancer Nick Marianos led the Piqued Jacks' creative team responsible for the group's stage presence, having previously served in that role for San Marino in 2019 for Serhat's "Say Na Na Na". The group appeared on stage in all black with red details and were surrounded by red screens that at times showed lips and eyes. The group's outfits for several promotional events as well as the contest itself were handled by Tuscan designer Noell Maggini.

At the end of the 11 May second semi-final, San Marino was not among the 10 countries announced as qualifiers for the final. It was later revealed that the nation had placed last in its semi-final, receiving no points.

=== Voting ===
Voting during the shows involved each country awarding sets of points from 1–8, 10 and 12: one from their professional jury and the other from televoting in the final vote, while the semi-final vote was based entirely on the vote of the public. As San Marino shares its telephone system with Italy, televoting results from the nation were instead produced by jury votes. Each nation's jury consisted of five music industry professionals who are citizens of the country they represent. This jury judged each entry based on: vocal capacity; the stage performance; the song's composition and originality; and the overall impression by the act. The exact composition of the professional jury, and the results of each country's jury and televoting were released after the final; the individual results from each jury member were released in an anonymised form. The Sammarinese jury consisted of Francesco Stefanelli, Lewis Busignani, Luca Zucchi, Barbara Andreini, and Sabrina Minguzzi.

In the second semi-final, San Marino finished in last place out of 16 entries and did not receive any points. Romania also did not receive any points, but placed 15th according to the tie-breaking rules, placing it ahead of San Marino. This marked the first time that San Marino had received no points at Eurovision. Over the course of the contest, the nation awarded its top 12 points to Lithuania in the second semi-final and to Italy (jury) and Finland (televote) in the final. John Kennedy O'Connor served as the Sammarinese spokesperson, announcing the votes awarded by the Sammarinese jury during the final.

==== Points awarded to San Marino ====
In the semi-final, San Marino did not receive any points in the televote.

==== Points awarded by San Marino ====
Points awarded by San Marino (Semi-final 2)
Score	Jury (Note: Due to San Marino's inability to provide a televoting result, its backup jury votes were used.)
12 points	Lithuania
10 points	Estonia
8 points	Austria
7 points	Iceland
6 points	Australia
5 points	Belgium
4 points	Armenia
3 points	Georgia
2 points	Poland
1 point	Cyprus

Points awarded by San Marino (Final)
Score	Aggregated televote	Jury
12 points	Finland	Italy
10 points	Israel	Estonia
8 points	Sweden	Lithuania
7 points	Italy	Belgium
6 points	Ukraine	Austria
5 points	Cyprus	Australia
4 points	Norway	Sweden
3 points	Moldova	Moldova
2 points	Lithuania	Spain
1 point	Poland	Norway

==== Detailed voting results ====
The following members comprised the Sammarinese jury:

- Francesco Stefanelli
- Lewis Busignani
- Luca Zucchi
- Barbara Andreini
- Sabrina Minguzzi

Detailed voting results from San Marino (Semi-final 2)
R/O	Country	Jury	
R/O	Country	Rank	Points
01	Denmark	14	
02	Armenia	7	4
03	Romania	15	
04	Estonia	2	10
05	Belgium	6	5
06	Cyprus	10	1
07	Iceland	4	7
08	Greece	11	
09	Poland	9	2
10	Slovenia	13	
11	Georgia	8	3
12	San Marino		
13	Austria	3	8
14	Albania	12	
15	Lithuania	1	12
16	Australia	5	6

Detailed voting results from San Marino (Final)
R/O	Country	Jury							Aggregated televote	
R/O	Country	Juror 1	Juror 2	Juror 3	Juror 4	Juror 5	Rank	Points	Rank	Points
01	Austria	11	13	2	5	5	5	6	17	
02	Portugal	23	20	18	14	10	20		26	
03	Switzerland	20	19	23	21	22	25		15	
04	Poland	8	15	8	15	13	14		10	1
05	Serbia	22	26	24	19	11	21		24	
06	France	25	10	20	7	17	16		11	
07	Cyprus	13	9	13	9	9	13		6	5
08	Spain	14	2	14	12	19	9	2	21	
09	Sweden	12	3	12	6	8	7	4	3	8
10	Albania	5	17	7	13	12	11		18	
11	Italy	1	1	3	1	1	1	12	4	7
12	Estonia	2	16	6	2	2	2	10	25	
13	Finland	24	25	26	24	24	26		1	12
14	Czech Republic	17	14	19	10	18	19		19	
15	Australia	7	18	5	11	3	6	5	23	
16	Belgium	3	8	1	16	14	4	7	14	
17	Armenia	15	7	15	18	6	12		12	
18	Moldova	4	4	10	17	21	8	3	8	3
19	Ukraine	19	6	22	20	16	17		5	6
20	Norway	10	21	17	4	7	10	1	7	4
21	Germany	26	22	25	22	15	24		20	
22	Lithuania	6	5	4	3	4	3	8	9	2
23	Israel	9	11	21	8	20	15		2	10
24	Slovenia	16	12	9	26	25	18		22	
25	Croatia	21	23	11	25	26	22		16	
26	United Kingdom	18	24	16	23	23	23		13	
