= San Marino in the Eurovision Song Contest 2022 =

- Eurovision Song Contest 2022
- Participating broadcaster: San Marino RTV (SMRTV)
- Country: San Marino
- Selection process: Una voce per San Marino
- Selection date: 19 February 2022

Competing entry
- Song: "Stripper"
- Artist: Achille Lauro
- Songwriters: Daniele Dezi; Daniele Mungai; Davide Petrella; Federico De Marinis; Francesco Viscovo; Gregorio Calculli; Lauro De Marinis; Marco Lanciotti; Matteo Ciceroni; Mattia Cutolo; Simon Pietro Manzari

Placement
- Semi-final result: Failed to qualify (14th)

Participation chronology

San Marino was represented at the Eurovision Song Contest 2022 with the song "Stripper" performed by Achille Lauro. The Sammarinese broadcaster, San Marino RTV (SMRTV), organised a new national final concept entitled Una voce per San Marino ("A voice for San Marino") to decide their representative. The event consisted of 299 emerging and nine established artists competing over a three-month period from December 2021 through February 2022 for the opportunity to represent the nation at the contest. The winning entry "Stripper" was written by Lauro, Daniele Dezi, Daniele Mungai, Davide Petrella, Federico De Marinis, Francesco Viscovo, Gregorio Calculli, Marco Lanciotti, Matteo Ciceroni, Mattia Cutolo and Simon Pietro Manzari.

To promote the entry, Lauro released the song as a digital download, lyric video and a music video consisting of the performance of the entry at Una voce per San Marino. A promotional tour was initially scheduled, but appearances were subsequently canceled due to the rise in COVID-19 cases occurring at the time. San Marino was drawn to compete in the second semi-final of the Eurovision Song Contest 2022 which took place on 12 May 2022. Performing during the show seventh in the running order, "Stripper" was not announced among the top 10 entries of its semi-final and therefore did not qualify to compete in the final. It was later revealed that San Marino placed 14th out of the 18 participating countries in the semi-final with 50 points.

== Background ==
Prior to the 2022 contest, San Marino had participated in the Eurovision Song Contest 11 times since their first entry in 2008. The nation's debut entry in the 2008 contest, "Complice" performed by Miodio, failed to qualify for the final and placed last in the semi-final it competed in. San Marino subsequently did not participate in both the 2009 and 2010 contests, citing financial difficulties. They returned in 2011 with Italian singer Senit performing "Stand By", which also failed to take the nation to the final. From 2012 to 2014, San Marino sent Valentina Monetta to the contest on three consecutive occasions, which made her the first singer to participate in three consecutive contests since Udo Jürgens, who competed in 1964, 1965 and 1966 for Austria. Monetta's first two entries failed to qualify San Marino to the final, however in 2014, she managed to bring the nation to the final for the first time with "Maybe", placing 24th. Following four consecutive non-qualifying years, San Marino qualified for the final for its second time in the Eurovision Song Contest 2019, where Serhat represented the nation for his second time and finished in 19th place in the final with "Say Na Na Na". For the 2020 contest, Senhit and her song "Freaky!" were to represent the nation, though following its cancelation, San Marino re-selected Senhit for 2021. Her song, "Adrenalina", which she performed alongside American rapper Flo Rida, qualified for the final, eventually placing 22nd out of the 26 entries. San Marino RTV (SMRTV) confirmed the nation's participation in the 2022 contest on 5 April 2021, at the same time also revealing that they intended to select their entry through a national final entitled Una voce per San Marino.

== Before Eurovision ==
=== Una voce per San Marino ===
On 5 April 2021, as part of the release of a 2021–2022 tourism events calendar introduced by the government of San Marino, SMRTV confirmed the nation's participation in the 2022 contest and the introduction of Una voce per San Marino ("A voice for San Marino"), a new national final format to select the nation's entry. This marked the second time that the nation had opted to select their entry with a national final format, the first time being in 2018 with 1in360.

Una voce per San Marino was held between December 2021 and February 2022. Interested artists could apply to partake in the event through the official Una voce per San Marino website, which was open for submissions until 8 January 2022. There were no restrictions on the nationality of the performer nor the language of the song, though all artists and songs had to comply with the rules of the Eurovision Song Contest as set by the European Broadcasting Union (EBU). At the close of the application window, all selected artists were divided into two categories: Emerging and Established. Emerging artists attended an academy in the Teatro Titano in the City of San Marino from 13 to 17 December 2021 and 3–11 January 2022, acting as preliminary castings. Then, from 13 to 17 February 2022, a series of semi-finals decided the nine Emerging acts that moved on to the final. Established artists, numbering nine in total as well, were directly invited to the final by Media Evolution SRL. Aside from the first place act becoming the Sammarinese representative at Eurovision, the first, second and third placings of the final were also awarded €7000, €2000 and €1000, respectively.

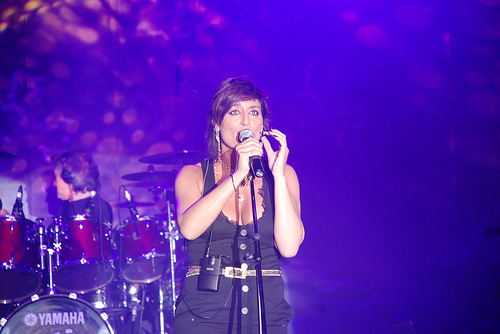
Roberta Faccani was one of the seven members of the jury of Una voce per San Marino.

Voting for the Emerging artists shows was performed by a seven-member jury. The first four members of the jury for this category, announced on 16 November 2021, were Emilio Munda, Roberta Faccani, Roberto Costa and Steve Lyon. The remaining three jury members for the category were announced on 31 December 2021, and were Maurizio Raimo, Nabuk and Mimmo Paganelli.

==== Emerging acts auditions ====
A submission period was opened by SMRTV on 22 September 2021 for emerging artists and composers to submit their entries. By 16 November 2021, the broadcaster announced it had received over 200 applications, particularly from Germany, Russia and Sweden, but also from other European countries, the United States and Australia. Near the close of the submission period, SMRTV reported that they had received 585 applications overall, out of which 299 were selected to take part in the emerging acts round. The emerging acts auditions took place between 13 and 17 December 2021 and 3–11 January 2022. From December and over the course of two months, the 299 participants took part in the auditions (though only 282 were listed). From the emerging acts round, 60 international entrants and six Sammarinese had qualified for the semi-finals and they were revealed on 17 January 2022. Highlights from the auditions were then broadcast on San Marino RTV over three consecutive Fridays from 14 January to 28 January 2022.

The six Sammarinese acts selected from the auditions were Alibi, Elisa Mazza, Garon & Duan, Giada Pintori, Ginevra Bencivenga and Giulia Vitri. The 60 international emerging acts and their country of origin were as follows:

- Aaron Sibley (United Kingdom)
- Alessandra Simone (Italy)
- Alessia Labate (Italy)
- Alice Burani (Italy)
- Allerija (Italy)
- Anna Faragò (Italy)
- Ashley (Italy)
- Brenda (Italy)
- Camille Cabaltera (Italy)
- Corinna Parodi (Italy)
- Daniel Mincone (Italy)
- Daniela Pisciotta (Italy)
- Davide Rossi (Italy)
- Diego Federico (Austria)
- Elena & Francesco Faggi (Italy)
- Elisa Del Prete (Italy)
- Eliska Mrázová (Czech Republic)
- Ellynora (Italy)
- Florent Amare (France)
- Frio (Italy)
- Giada Varaschin (Italy)
- Giorgio Borghes (Claudia F) (United Kingdom)
- Gisele Abramoff (Brazil)
- I Koko (Italy)
- Jessica Anne Condon (United Kingdom)
- João Paulo & Miguel (Portugal)
- Joe Romano & TheStolenClipper (Italy)
- Katrin Roselli (Italy)
- Kimberly Genil (Italy)
- Kumi Watanabe (Italy)
- Kurt Cassar (Malta)
- Le Bebae (Italy)
- Leonardo Frezzotti (Italy)
- Lorenza Rocchiccioli (Italy)
- Luca Cima (Italy)
- Luca Veneri (Italy)
- Luci Blu (Italy)
- Mad (Italy)
- Marco Saltari (Italy)
- Maria Chiara Leoni (Italy)
- Martina Gaetano (Italy)
- Mate (Italy)
- Matilde Montanari (Italy)
- Matteo Giannaccini Gravante (Italy)
- Muriel (Italy)
- Nada e Sissi (Italy)
- OnlySara (Italy)
- Operapop (Italy)
- Oxa Sia (Germany)
- Raimondo Cataldo (Italy)
- Riccardo Foresi (Italy)
- Riccardo Guglielmi (Italy)
- Sebastian Schimdt (Germany)
- Snei Ap (Italy)
- Thomas Grazioso (Italy)
- Tothem (Italy)
- Valentina Tioli (Italy)
- Vanja Vatle (Norway)
- Veronica Liberati (Italy)
- Vina Rose (Italy)

==== Semi-finals ====
The 60 international emerging acts competed across three semi-finals from 13 February to 15 February 2022 and three acts qualified to the final from each respective semi-final. The next day, a fourth semi-final consisting of the six Sammarinese artists took place, with an additional three acts qualifying to the final. A second-chance round on 17 February 2022 allowed a further four of the previously eliminated emerging artists to qualify. A final for the emerging artists was held on 18 February 2022, where 9 of the 16 qualified acts proceeded to the final. All of these events took place at the Teatro Titano in the City of San Marino.

Of the emerging acts participants, Muriel was announced to have been disqualified from the competition on 10 February 2022 for unspecified reasons. Additionally, Allerija, Corinna Parodi and Diego Federico had been announced as participants in the semi-final, but were absent from the show without explanation.

Key: Finalist Second Chance Absent

Semi-final 1 – 13 February 2022
R/O	Artist	Song	Result
1	Aaron Sibley	"Pressure"	Finalist
2	Alessandra Simone	"A rabbia e favole"	Eliminated
3	Alessia Labate	"World Falls Down"	Second chance
4	Alice Burani	"Mezzanotte e ventidue"	Eliminated
5	Anna Faragò	"Randagia"	Second chance
6	Ashley	"In My Mind"	Eliminated
7	Brenda	"Occhi di uranio"	Eliminated
8	Camille Cabaltera	"Move 'Em Like You Never Did"	Finalist
9	Daniel Mincone	"In This World"	Eliminated
10	Isa J	"Tic Tac"	Second chance
11	Davide Rossi	"Wasted Love"	Eliminated
12	Elena & Francesco Faggi	"Nothing Can Blow Me Out"	Finalist
13	Elisa Del Prete	"Labirinto senza fine"	Eliminated
14	Ellynora	"Cuerpo"	Eliminated
15	Florent Amare	"Libre"	Eliminated
16	Frio	"A noite toda"	Second chance
17	Elis Mraz	"Imma Be"	Second chance
—N/a	~~Allerija~~	—	Absent
—N/a	~~Corinna Parodi~~	—	Absent
—N/a	~~Diego Federico~~	—	Absent

Semi-final 2 – 14 February 2022
R/O	Artist	Song	Result
1	Giada Varaschin	"W.A.T. (What a Tragedy)"	Second chance
2	Giorgio Borghes (Claudia F)	"Time Is Ticking"	Eliminated
3	Gisele Abramoff	"Higher than Before"	Second chance
4	I Koko	"Born to the River"	Eliminated
5	Jessica Anne Condon	"Water on the Ground"	Eliminated
6	João Paulo and Miguel	"Amore, infinito amore"	Eliminated
7	Joe Romano and TheStolenClipper	"Hallelujah"	Eliminated
8	Artika	"If You Love Me"	Finalist
9	Kimberly Genil	"Pink Skies"	Eliminated
10	Kumi	"Freedom"	Second chance
11	Kurt Cassar	"Tears of Gold"	Finalist
12	Le Bebae	"Fuori di te"	Eliminated
13	Fritz	"Blessing"	Eliminated
14	Lorenza Rocchiccioli	"Non mi batte mai neanche il cuore"	Finalist
15	Arkadia	"Feed the Flies"	Eliminated
16	Luca Veneri	"Dreams and Beliefs"	Eliminated
17	Luci Blu	"Bla Bla"	Eliminated
18	Mad	"Gitana"	Second chance
19	Marco Saltari	"Settembre (e poi ciao)"	Eliminated
20	MeriCler	"Tiramisù"	Second chance

Semi-final 3 – 15 February 2022
R/O	Artist	Song	Result
1	Martina Gaetano	"Coffee"	Second chance
2	Mate	"DNA"	Finalist
3	Matilde Montanari	"Diventerà realtà"	Eliminated
4	Matteo Giannaccini Gravante	"Read My Mind"	Eliminated
5	Nada & Sissi	"Mala Way"	Second chance
6	OnlySara	"Rubik"	Eliminated
7	Operapop	"Acqua nel deserto"	Eliminated
8	Oxa Sia	"Purple Sky"	Eliminated
9	Raymond	"Feelin' Broken"	Finalist
10	Riccardo Foresi	"Fino al mattino"	Eliminated
11	Herré	"Petali"	Eliminated
12	Basti	"Running"	Second chance
13	Thomas Grazioso	"Dance"	Eliminated
14	Snei Ap	"Viaggio"	Second chance
15	Tothem	"Celebrate"	Eliminated
16	Valentina Tioli	"Never Looking Back"	Eliminated
17	Vanja V	"Hymn of Hope"	Second chance
18	Veronica Liberati	"Once More a Little Smile"	Eliminated
19	Vina Rose	"Sweet Denial"	Finalist
—N/a	~~Muriel~~	—	Absent

==== Sammarinese artists final ====
The final for the competing entrants from San Marino took place on 16 February 2022. Six artists took part, with three advancing to the final.

Sammarinese artists final – 16 February 2022
R/O	Artist	Song	Result
1	Alibi	"Cambiamento"	Eliminated
2	Elisa Mazza	"Gonna Do Me"	Eliminated
3	Garon & Duan	"Power"	Finalist
4	Giada Pintori	"Luce e tenebre"	Finalist
5	Ginevra Bencivenga	"Calma apparente"	Eliminated
6	Giulia Vitri	"Father and Son"	Finalist

==== Second chance ====
The second chance round took place on 17 February 2022 and featured the fifteen acts that finished in 4th to 8th place in the first three semi-finals. Five of the fifteen acts qualified for the Emerging acts final.

Second chance round – 17 February 2022
R/O	Artist	Song	Result
1	Alessia Labate	"World Falls Down"	Finalist
2	Anna Faragò	"Randagia"	Eliminated
3	Daniela Pisciotta	"Tic Tac"	Eliminated
4	Elis Mraz	"Imma Be"	Eliminated
5	Frio	"A noite toda"	Finalist
6	Giada Varaschin	"W.A.T. (What a Tragedy)"	Eliminated
7	Gisele Abramoff	"Higher than Before"	Eliminated
8	Kumi	"Freedom"	Finalist
9	Mad	"Gitana"	Eliminated
10	MeriCler	"Tiramisù"	Finalist
11	Martina Gaetano	"Coffee"	Eliminated
12	Nada & Sissi	"Mala Way"	Eliminated
13	Basti	"Running"	Finalist
14	Snei Ap	"Viaggio"	Eliminated
15	Vanja V	"Hymn of Hope"	Eliminated

==== Emerging acts final ====
The Emerging acts final took place on 18 February 2022 and featured the 17 qualifying acts from the previous four shows. Nine of the 17 acts qualified for a place in the final.

Emerging acts final – 18 February 2022
R/O	Artist	Song	Points	Place
1	Aaron Sibley	"Pressure"	46	1
2	Alessia Labate	"World Falls Down"	42	5
3	Camille Cabaltera	"Move 'Em Like You Never Did"	44	2
4	Elena & Francesco Faggi	"Nothing Can Blow Me Out"	40	8
5	Frio	"A noite toda"	33	16
6	Garon & Duan	"Power"	38	12
7	Giada Pintori	"Luce e tenebre"	34	15
8	Giulia Vitri	"Father and Son"	29	17
9	Artika	"If You Love Me"	40	10
10	Kumi	"Freedom"	36	13
11	Kurt Cassar	"Tears of Gold"	41	7
12	Lorenza Rocchiccioli	"Non mi batte mai neanche il cuore"	36	14
13	MeriCler	"Tiramisù"	42	6
14	Mate	"DNA"	40	9
15	Raymond	"Feelin' Broken"	39	11
16	Basti	"Running"	44	3
17	Vina Rose	"Sweet Denial"	43	4

==== Established artists ====
On 8 February 2022, SMRTV announced the identity of the ten established artists that qualified automatically for the final in their category. One day before the final, it was announced that established participant Blind had withdrawn for health reasons.

Established artists
- Achille Lauro
- ~~Blind~~
- Burak Yeter and Alessandro Coli
- Cristina Ramos
- Fabry and Labiuse feat. Miodio
- Francesco Monte
- Ivana Spagna
- Matteo Faustini
- Tony Cicco, Deshedus and Alberto Fortis
- Valerio Scanu

==== Final ====
The final took place on 19 February 2022 at the Teatro Nuovo in Dogana, and was hosted by Senhit and Jonathan Kashanian. A total of 18 artists participated, nine from the Emerging section and nine from the Established section. A five-member jury decided the top three, with the winner going on to represent the country at Eurovision 2022. Each jury member assigned points to the entries ranging from one to ten based on their personal preferences, with the winner being the entry with the highest point total. The jury consisted of: Mogol (songwriter; jury president), Simon Lee (conductor, composer and arranger), Clarissa Martinelli (radio presenter), Susanne Georgi (2009 Andorran representative) and Dino Stewart (managing director at BMG Italy). Faccani, who had been a member of the emerging artists jury earlier in the process, opted to not continue in that role for the final. Italian singer Al Bano (who represented his country at Eurovision in 1976 and 1985), Senhit (representative of San Marino in 2011 and 2021) and Valentina Monetta (representative of San Marino in 2012, 2013, 2014 and 2017) performed as guests during the final. The winner of the event was Achille Lauro with the song "Stripper", marking the fourth time that an Italian artist had been selected to represent San Marino. "Stripper" was written by Lauro, Daniele Dezi, Daniele Mungai, Davide Petrella, Federico De Marinis. Francesco Viscovo, Gregorio Calculli, Marco Lanciotti, Matteo Ciceroni, Mattia Cutolo and Simon Pietro Manzari.

Final – 19 February 2022
R/O	Artist	Song	Points	Place
1	Elena & Francesco Faggi	"Nothing Can Blow Me Out"	31	11
2	Matteo Faustini	"L'ultima parola"	35	5
3	Aaron Sibley	"Pressure"	39	3
4	Ivana Spagna	"Seriously in Love"	37	4
5	Vina Rose	"Sweet Denial"	34	7
6	Cristina Ramos	"Heartless Game"	31	11
7	Alessia Labate	"World Falls Down"	27	17
8	Achille Lauro	"Stripper"	41	1
9	Mate	"DNA"	27	17
10	Tony Cicco, Deshedus & Alberto Fortis	"Sono un uomo"	33	9
11	Basti	"Running"	31	11
12	Francesco Monte	"Mi ricordo di te (Adrenalina)"	35	5
13	Kurt Cassar	"Tears of Gold"	30	16
14	Valerio Scanu	"Io credo"	31	11
15	MeriCler	"Tiramisù"	33	9
16	Burak Yeter ft. Alessandro Coli	"More than You"	40	2
17	Camille Cabaltera	"Move 'Em Like You Never Did"	34	7
18	Fabry & Labiuse ft. Miodio	"Blu"	31	11

=== Promotion ===
To promote "Stripper" as the entry for San Marino, the song was released on all digital platforms on 4 March 2022, coinciding with the release of a lyric video. A promotional music video of the performance during the final Una voce per San Marino had previously been released on the YouTube channel of the Eurovision Song Contest on 23 February. The song was due to be performed at the 26 March Eurovision Party in Barcelona, but was unable to after members of the band contracted COVID-19. Lauro indicated that due to the inability to use playbacks, he would be unable to perform without the band. The next day, SMRTV announced that they had opted to not have the singer perform at the Eurovision in Concert event on 9 April in Amsterdam either or at any other live pre-Eurovision events, citing the rise in COVID-19 cases occurring at the time.

A free "Meet & Greet" for fans was scheduled for 23 April at Teatro Concordia in Borgo Maggiore, San Marino, however, the event was postponed shortly after its announcement, with staff citing the entrant's rehearsal schedule and security as being factors. A previously announced press conference on 22 April, the day before, did take place at the Palazzo Pubblico, where Lauro spoke about the link Eurovision creates between countries.

== At Eurovision ==
The Eurovision Song Contest 2022 took place at the PalaOlimpico in Turin, Italy, and consisted of two semi-finals held on the respective dates of 10 and 12 May and the final on 14 May 2022. According to the Eurovision rules, all participating countries, except the host nation and the "Big Five", consisting of France, Germany, Italy, Spain and the United Kingdom, are required to qualify from one of two semi-finals to compete for the final; the top 10 countries from their respective semi-finals progress to the final. Prior to the semi-final allocation draw, the European Broadcasting Union (EBU) split the competing countries into six different pots based on voting patterns from previous contests as determined by the contest's televoting partner Digame, with the aim of reducing the chance of neighbourly voting between countries while also increasing suspense during the voting process. On 25 January 2022, an allocation draw was held at Palazzo Madama in Turin, which placed each nation into one of the two semi-finals and determined which half of the show they would perform in. Therein, it was announced that San Marino was scheduled to perform in the first half of the second semi-final of the contest, to be held on 12 May. Once all the competing entries for the 2022 contest had been released, the running order for the semi-finals was decided by the producers of the contest to prevent similar songs from being placed next to each other. San Marino was set to perform seventh, following the entry from the Malta and before the entry from Australia. In San Marino, the two semi-finals and the final were broadcast on San Marino RTV and Radio San Marino with commentary by Lia Fiorio and Gigi Restivo.

=== Performances ===
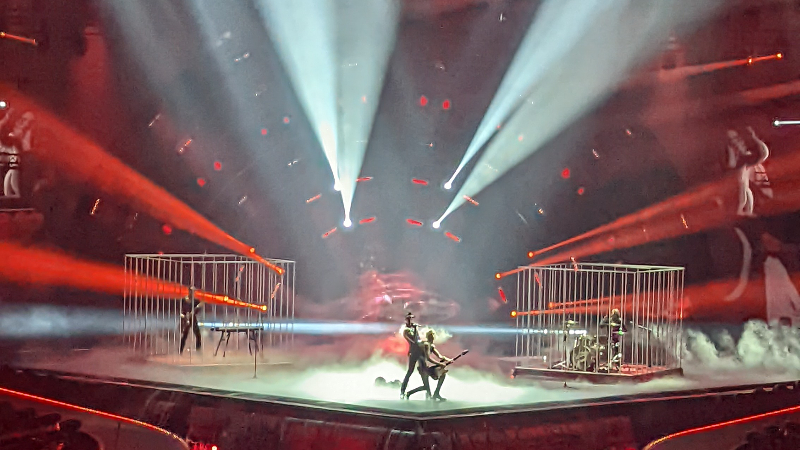
Achille Lauro performing "Stripper" at the contest in Turin.

Achille took part in rehearsals on 2 and 5 May, followed by dress rehearsals on 11 and 12 May 2022. This included the jury show where the five-member juries of eighteen of the participating countries, responsible for 50 percent of each country's respective vote, watched and voted on the competing entries of the second semi-final. The performance of "Stripper" saw Lauro dressed in a sheer bodysuit wearing a fur boa and cowboy hat. Two members of his band were in cages, while the guitarist interacted with Lauro throughout the performance, including kissing the singer. At one point, Lauro rides a velvet pink mechanical bull in the performance, which also featured fireworks. Many media outlets noted the positive response to the same sex kiss as a historic moment in Eurovision. At the end of the voting phase for the second semi-final, San Marino was not announced as a qualifier for the final. It was later revealed that the nation placed 14th out of the 18 competing nations in the second semi-final with a total of 50 points.

=== Voting ===
Voting during the three shows involved each country awarding two sets of points from 1–8, 10 and 12: one from their expert jury and the other from televoting. Each nation's jury consisted of five music industry professionals who are citizens of the country they represent. The jury judged each entry based on vocal capacity, the stage performance, the song's composition and originality and the overall impression by the act. No member of a national jury was permitted to be connected in any way to any of the competing acts in such a way that they cannot vote impartially and independently. Labiuse served as the Sammarinese spokesperson, announcing the votes awarded by the Sammarinese jury during the final. Below is a breakdown of points awarded to San Marino and awarded by San Marino in both the second semi-final and the final of the contest, and the breakdown of the jury voting and televoting conducted during the two shows.

==== Points awarded to San Marino ====
Points awarded to San Marino (Semi-final 2)
Score	Televote	Jury
12 points		Belgium
10 points		
8 points	Malta	
7 points		
6 points		
5 points	Australia	Finland
4 points	Finland; Poland	
3 points	Spain; United Kingdom	
2 points	Romania	Poland; Romania
1 point		

==== Points awarded by San Marino ====
Points awarded by San Marino (Semi-final 2)
Score	Aggregated televote	Aggregated jury
12 points	Serbia	Sweden
10 points	Sweden	Australia
8 points	Romania	Poland
7 points	Australia	Estonia
6 points	Czech Republic	Czech Republic
5 points	Poland	Belgium
4 points	Cyprus	Azerbaijan
3 points	Finland	Finland
2 points	Israel	Serbia
1 point	Belgium	Malta

Points awarded by San Marino (Final)
Score	Aggregated televote	Aggregated jury
12 points	Ukraine	Spain
10 points	Spain	Greece
8 points	Serbia	United Kingdom
7 points	Greece	Azerbaijan
6 points	United Kingdom	Australia
5 points	Italy	Sweden
4 points	Moldova	Poland
3 points	Sweden	Italy
2 points	Norway	Ukraine
1 point	Romania	Switzerland

==== Jury vote issues ====
In a statement released during the broadcast of the final, the EBU revealed that six countries, including San Marino, were found to have irregular jury voting patterns during the second semi-final. Consequently, these countries were given substitute aggregated jury scores for both the second semi-final and the final (shown above), calculated from the corresponding jury scores of countries with historically similar voting patterns as determined by the pots for the semi-final allocation draw held in January. As such, San Marino's jury votes were determined based on those from Bulgaria, Cyprus, Greece, Malta and Portugal. Their televoting scores were unaffected. The Flemish broadcaster VRT later reported that the juries involved had made agreements to vote for each other's entries to secure qualification to the final.

On 19 May, the EBU released a further statement clarifying the irregularities in voting patterns. This confirmed that the six countries involved had consistently scored each other's entries disproportionately highly in the second semi-final: the Sammarinese jury, as well as the juries from Azerbaijan, Georgia and Romania, had each ranked the other five countries' entries as their top five, proving beyond statistical coincidence that they had colluded to achieve a higher placing. This prompted the suspension of San Marino's intended jury scores (shown below) in favour of the EBU's calculated aggregate scores, presented above.

San Marino's suspended jury results (Semi-final 2)
Score	Country
12 points	Romania
10 points	Georgia
8 points	Poland
7 points	Montenegro
6 points	Azerbaijan
5 points	Serbia
4 points	Australia
3 points	Sweden
2 points	Israel
1 point	Estonia

Detailed voting results of San Marino's suspended vote (Semi-final 2)
R/O	Country	Juror 1	Juror 2	Juror 3	Juror 4	Juror 5	Rank	Points
01	Finland	14	12	10	16	17	15	
02	Israel	15	5	11	5	10	9	2
03	Serbia	7	3	14	9	3	6	5
04	Azerbaijan	5	9	9	1	5	5	6
05	Georgia	8	2	1	4	1	2	10
06	Malta	16	17	16	10	11	16	
07	San Marino							
08	Australia	2	8	12	7	8	7	4
09	Cyprus	17	10	8	12	9	13	
10	Ireland	9	13	13	13	13	14	
11	North Macedonia	13	14	17	14	16	17	
12	Estonia	6	11	6	15	12	10	1
13	Romania	1	1	3	3	6	1	12
14	Poland	10	4	2	2	4	3	8
15	Montenegro	3	6	7	6	2	4	7
16	Belgium	11	15	4	17	14	11	
17	Sweden	12	7	5	8	7	8	3
18	Czech Republic	4	16	15	11	15	12	

==== Detailed final results ====
Detailed voting results from San Marino (Semi-final 2)
R/O	Country	Aggregated jury		Aggregated televote	
R/O	Country	Rank	Points	Rank	Points
01	Finland	8	3	8	3
02	Israel	11		9	2
03	Serbia	9	2	1	12
04	Azerbaijan	7	4	15	
05	Georgia	14		14	
06	Malta	10	1	11	
07	San Marino				
08	Australia	2	10	4	7
09	Cyprus	17		7	4
10	Ireland	15		13	
11	North Macedonia	13		16	
12	Estonia	4	7	12	
13	Romania	12		3	8
14	Poland	3	8	6	5
15	Montenegro	16		17	
16	Belgium	6	5	10	1
17	Sweden	1	12	2	10
18	Czech Republic	5	6	5	6

Detailed voting results from San Marino (Final)
R/O	Country	Aggregated jury		Aggregated televote	
R/O	Country	Rank	Points	Rank	Points
01	Czech Republic	14		22	
02	Romania	21		10	1
03	Portugal	15		18	
04	Finland	23		14	
05	Switzerland	10	1	24	
06	France	24		19	
07	Norway	19		9	2
08	Armenia	16		13	
09	Italy	8	3	6	5
10	Spain	1	12	2	10
11	Netherlands	11		15	
12	Ukraine	9	2	1	12
13	Germany	25		21	
14	Lithuania	18		12	
15	Azerbaijan	4	7	23	
16	Belgium	13		20	
17	Greece	2	10	4	7
18	Iceland	22		25	
19	Moldova	17		7	4
20	Sweden	6	5	8	3
21	Australia	5	6	17	
22	United Kingdom	3	8	5	6
23	Poland	7	4	11	
24	Serbia	12		3	8
25	Estonia	20		16	
