= Music of San Marino =

San Marino is a small sovereign state located within the territory of Italy. It has a musical heritage which includes the 17th-century composer Francesco Maria Marini and the 20th-century composer Cesare Franchini Tassini (1925–2010).

== Overview ==
Among the more prominent Sammarinese musicians is the 17th-century composer Francesco Maria Marini. Other personalities include the composer Stefano Filippini (c. 1601–1690), who was the maestro di cappella at a San Marino cathedral in 1675, while the noted luthier Marino Capicchioni (1895–1977) was born and raised in the country.

Since 1894, a wordless composition by Federico Consolo has been the national anthem of San Marino. The piece is based on a 10th-century choral composition. The previous anthem was by Aur. Muccioli and U. Balsimelli, and is similar to the Italian national anthem.

The modern military forces of San Marino parade through the streets in full uniform several times a day, accompanied by the sounds of a military brass band.

There is a small metal scene with Necrofilia and Nothing Inside Eyes the latter being formed from another band called Alchimia 2012.

The pop singer Little Tony achieved success in the United Kingdom and Italy in the late 1950s and early 1960s, reaching number 19 on the UK singles chart in 1960, and participating in the Sanremo Music Festival ten times between 1961 and 2008.

San Marino has participated in the Eurovision Song Contest 15 times since its first entry in 2008. The country has reached the final four times. They first qualified in 2014 with Valentina Monetta and her song "Maybe", where it reached 24th place. They also qualified in 2019 with Turkish singer Serhat (who also represented San Marino in 2016 but failed to qualify) with his song "Say Na Na Na", where it reached 19th place. They also qualified in 2021 with Italian singer Senhit (who represented San Marino in 2011 but failed to qualify and was supposed to represent San Marino in the cancelled 2020 contest) and American rapper Flo Rida with the song "Adrenalina", which reached 22nd place. Another qualification happened in 2025 when Gabry Ponte represented the country. Out of 15 participations, only three artists were actually related to San Marino: Valentina Monetta who has participated four times for the country, Anita Simoncini who participated in 2015, and the Italo-Sammarinese band Miodio debuted for the republic in 2008.

San Marino has also competed five times in the Junior Eurovision Song Contest, with 9th place in 2025 as its best result.
