= Band of the Sammarinese Armed Forces =

Band of the Sammarinese Armed Forces Banda militare della Forze Armate Sammarinesi
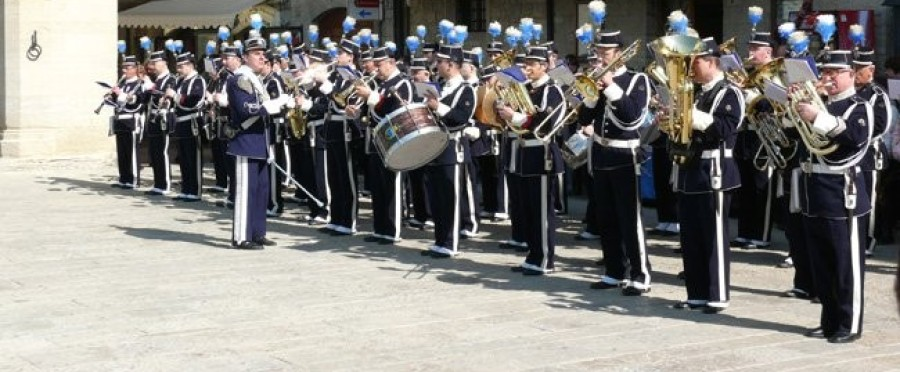
- The band at a flag raising ceremony in Freedom Square in 2016

Background information
- Origin: Città, San Marino
- Years active: 1843-present
- Website: www.bandamilitaresanmarino.org

The Band of the Sammarinese Armed Forces (Italian: Banda militare della Forze Armate Sammarinesi) is a Sammarinese ceremonial military band in San Marino which serves under the Company of Uniformed Militia of the armed forces. The current band director is Stefano Gatta, who has served in the band since 1990. It is currently based on Via Pietro Tonnin in the Sammarinese capital of San Marino City.

== History and functions ==
The band's establishment dates back to 12 June 1843, when it was associated with the Voluntary Uniformed Militia Corps. By decree, it was founded with Luigi Para, a Sammarinese musician and a pupil of composer Gioachino Rossini, acting as its first commander and musical director. The band, which currently comprises 60 musicians, has participated in several international festivals of music and military tattoos, most notably the International Music Festival in Italy, the Albertville Military Tattoo in France, and the Prague Tattoo in the Czech Republic. The military band accompanies the military forces of San Marino as they parade through the streets several times a day. With San Marino being a very small country, the band takes part in all official ceremonies in the country. It is one of the few military bands in the world to be composed of non-professional and inexperienced volunteers.

== Uniform ==
The uniform is, for the most part, similar to the Uniformed Militia's uniform, with notable differences being in decoration:

- Ceremonial uniform: The uniform is dark blue, and includes a white cross-strap, white and blue sash, white epaulettes, and white decorated cuffs. It also includes a kepi bearing a blue and white hackle plume.
- Dress uniform: A dark blue jacket and tie with a blue shirt for NCOs and a white shirt for the chief director. On the left sleeve, there is a shield with a harp in place of the military emblem of the country.

== See also ==
- Music of San Marino
