= Piqued Jacks =

Italian band

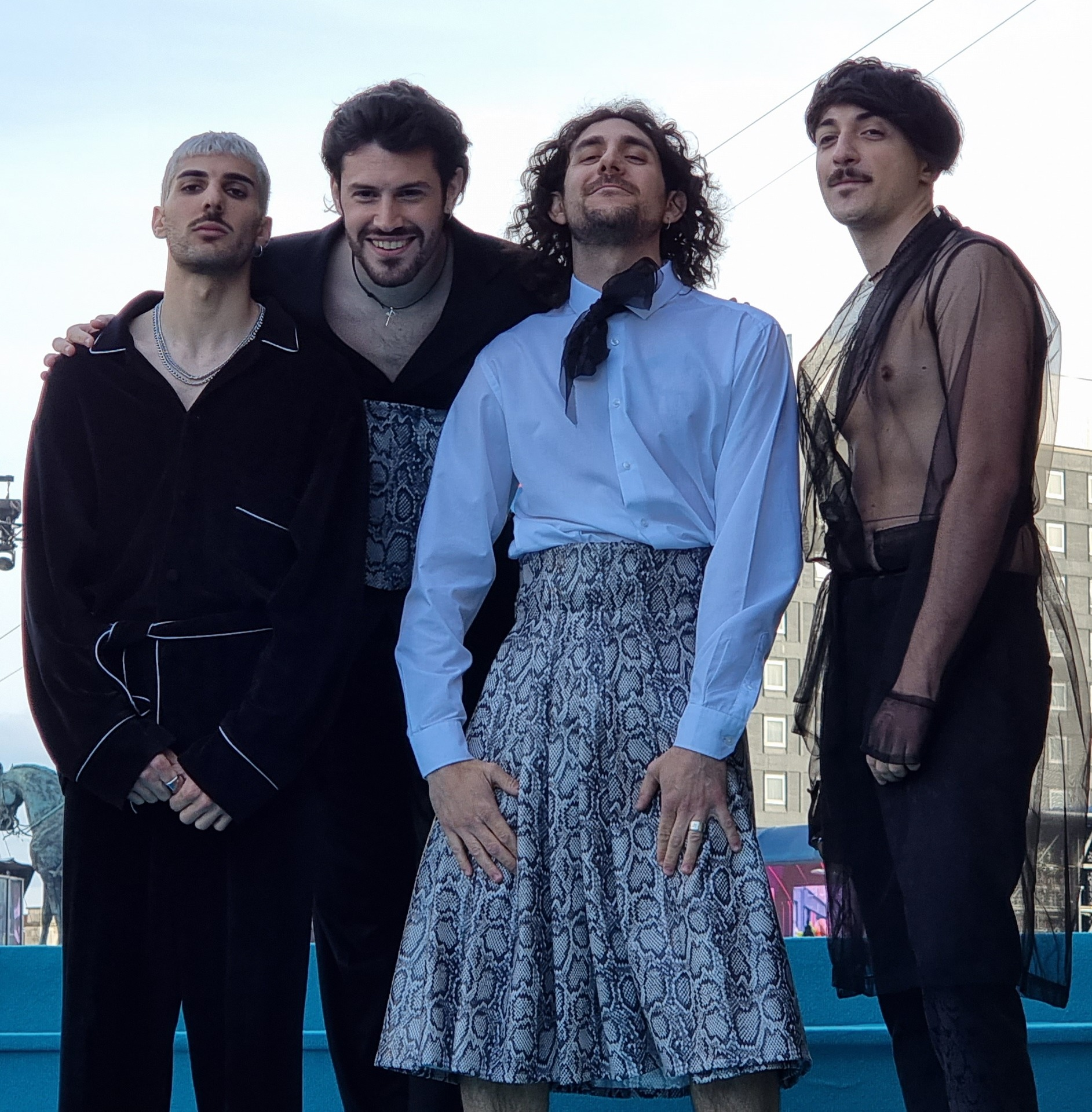
- Piqued Jacks at the Eurovision Turquoise Carpet in 2023

Background information
- Origin: Buggiano, Italy
- Genres: Indie rock; funk rock; alternative rock
- Years active: 2006–present
- Members: Andrea Lazzeretti; Francesco Bini; Tommaso Oliveri; Marco Sgaramella
- Past members: Francesco Cugia; Matteo Cugia; Damiano Beritelli

The Piqued Jacks are an Italian rock band formed in 2006 in Buggiano, consisting of four members Andrea Lazzeretti, Francesco Bini, Tommaso Oliveri and Marco Sgaramella. They represented San Marino in the Eurovision Song Contest 2023 with the song "Like an Animal".

== History ==
The Piqued Jacks were formed in 2006 in Buggiano, Tuscany, Italy.

In 2010 and 2011, the Piqued Jacks released their first two extended plays. In 2012, they worked with Los Angeles-based producer Brian Lanese on their third EP, titled Just a Machine, which was released in January 2013. In March 2014, they worked with Matt Noveskey on the singles "Upturned Perspectives" and "No Bazooka". The band's debut studio album Climb Like Ivy Does was released in 2015. An acoustic version of the album, titled Aerial Roots, was released in 2016.

In 2016, drummer Matteo Cugia left the band and was replaced Damiano Beritelli, who in turn was replaced by Tommaso Oliveri in 2017. In June 2018, the single "Wildly Shine" was released, which was pre-produced by Michael Beinhorn. Four months later, the band released their second studio album, The Living Past, which was produced by Dan Weller. In April 2019, guitarist Francesco Cugia was replaced by Marco Sgaramella.

In 2019, the Piqued Jacks won the award for the Rock category at Sanremo Rock. In May 2020, they became part of the MTV New Generation music container. In September 2020, the single "Safety Distance" was released, their first work with Brett Shaw. In March 2021, they released their third studio album Synchronizer, produced by Julian Emery, Brett Shaw and Dan Weller.

In 2023, the band participated in the second edition of Una voce per San Marino with their unpublished song "Like an Animal". They went on to win the competition, and therefore represented San Marino in the Eurovision Song Contest 2023 held in Liverpool, United Kingdom. They performed in the second semi-final, but failed to qualify for the final

After Eurovision the band released two more songs in 2023 "Color Shades" and "The Gum", in January 2024 they released their first single in Italian "Aria". The band announced the release of the 2026 album, their first Italian language album, on 16th October with a launch event in Prato, Tuscany.

== Members ==
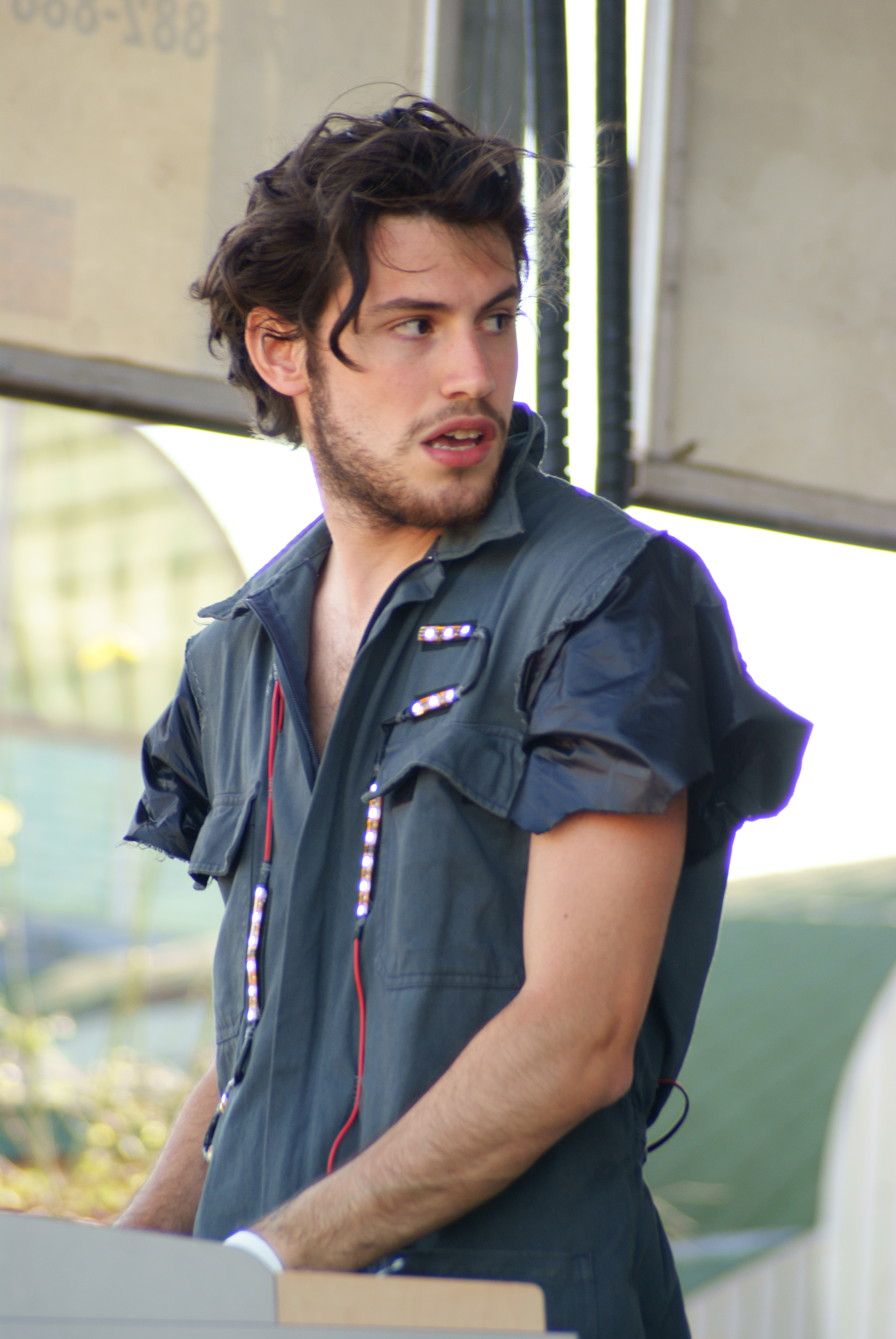
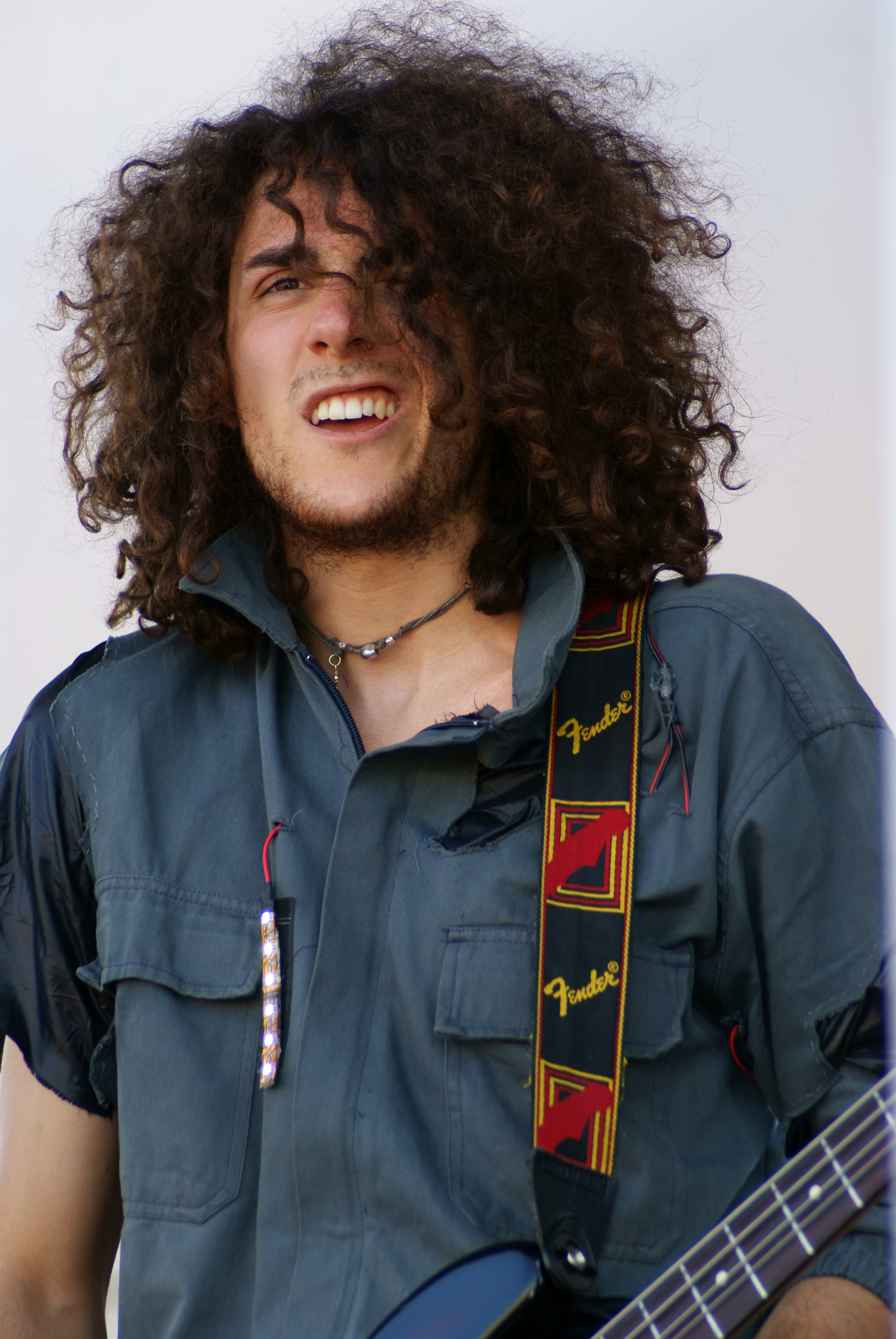
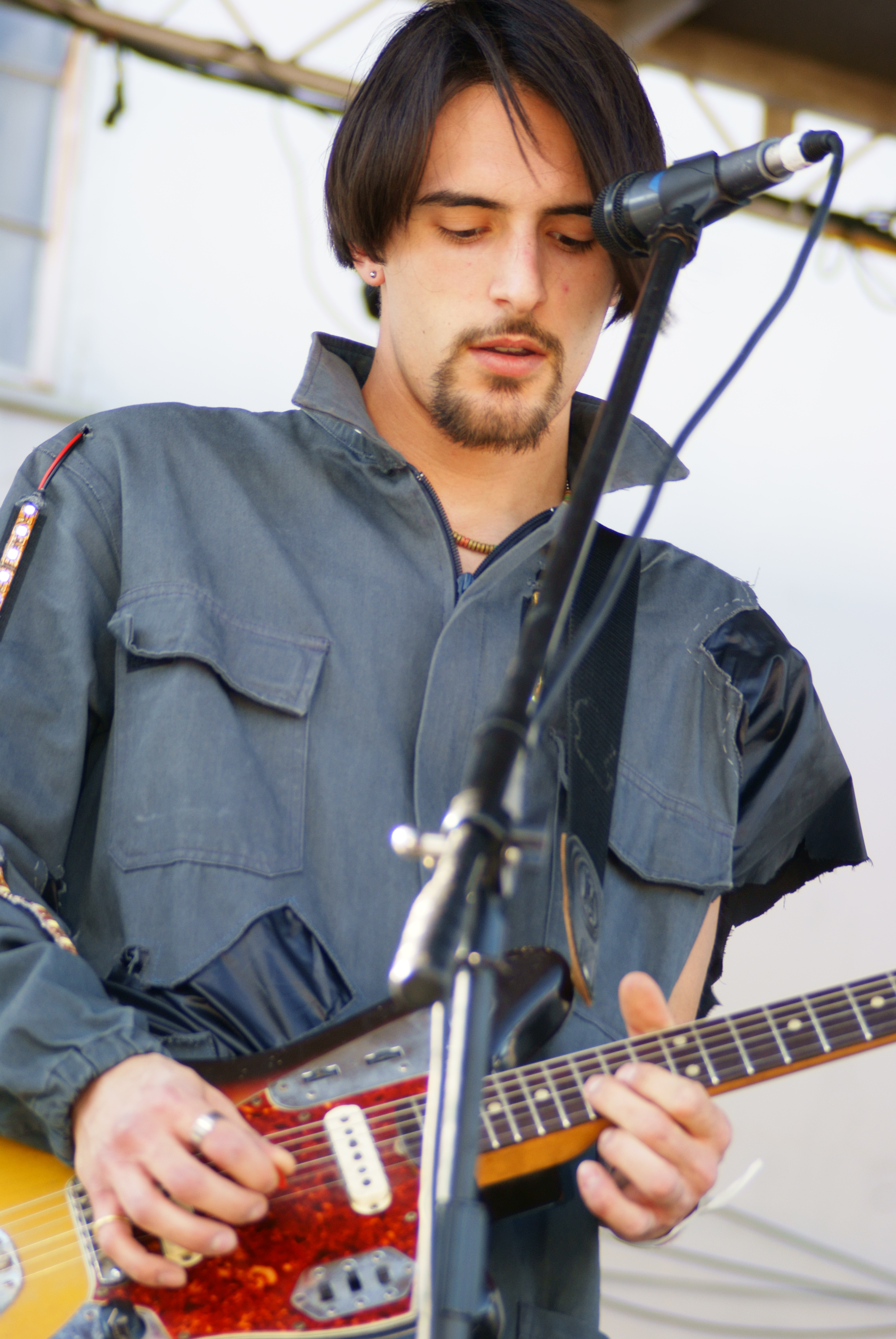
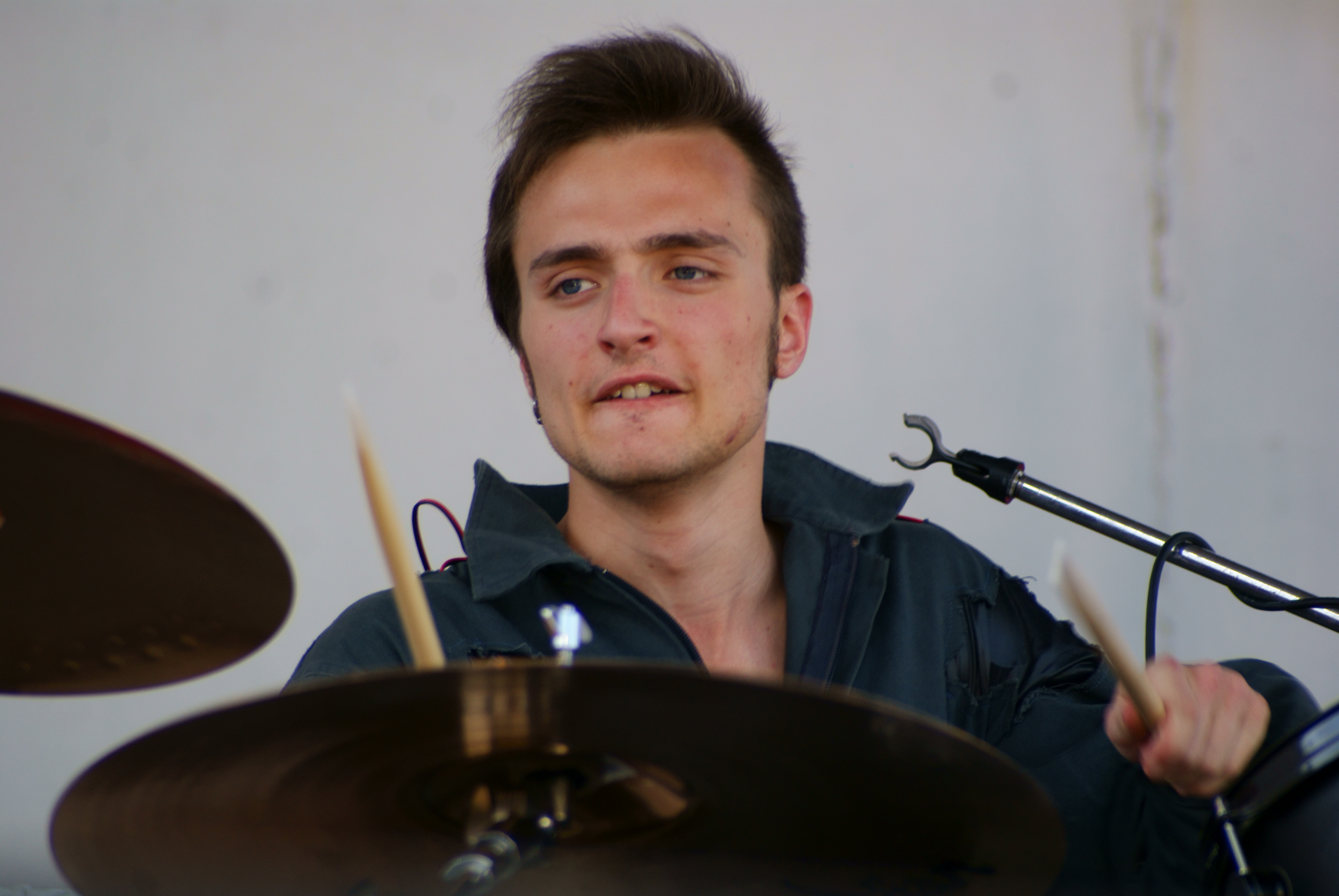
Andrea Lazzeretti, Francesco Bini, Francesco Cugia and Matteo Cugia in Austin, Texas in 2013

=== Current members ===
- Andrea "E-King" Lazzeretti (2006–present) – vocals, keyboards
- Francesco "littleladle" Bini (2006–present) – bass, backing vocals
- Tommaso "HolyHargot" Oliveri (2017–present) – drums
- Marco "Majic-o" Sgaramella (2019–present) – guitar, backing vocals

=== Former members ===
- Francesco "Penguinsane" Cugia (2006–2019) – guitar
- Matteo "ThEd0g" Cugia (2006–2016) – drums
- Damiano Beritelli (2016–2017) – drums

== Discography ==
=== Studio albums ===
- 2015 – Climb like Ivy Does
- 2016 – Aerial Roots
- 2018 – The Living Past
- 2021 – Synchronizer
- 2026 – Cambio Forma

=== Extended plays ===
- 2008 – Tight-Mess
- 2010 – Momo the Monkey
- 2011 – Brotherhoods
- 2013 – Just a Machine

=== Singles ===
- 2013 – "My Kite"
- 2013 – "Youphoric?!"
- 2013 – "Amusement Park"
- 2014 – "Upturned Perspectives'
- 2014 – "No Bazooka"
- 2015 – "Romantic Soldier"
- 2016 – "Shyest Kindred Spirit (Acoustic)"
- 2018 – "Eternal Ride of a Heartful Mind"
- 2018 – "Loner vs Lover"
- 2018 – "Wildly Shine"
- 2020 – "Safety Distance"
- 2020 – "Every Day Special"
- 2020 – "Golden Mine"
- 2021 – "Elephant"
- 2021 – "Mysterious Equations"
- 2021 – "Fire Brigade"
- 2022 – "Everything South"
- 2022 – "Particles"
- 2022 – "Sunflower"
- 2023 – "Like an Animal"
- 2023 – "Color Shades"
- 2023 – "The Gum"
- 2024 – "Aria"
- 2026 – "Specchio"
- 2026 - "Cambio Forma"
- 2026 - "Dove Andrei"
- 2026 - "Radio Alta"

Awards and achievements
Preceded by Achille Lauro with "Stripper"	San Marino in the Eurovision Song Contest; 2023	Succeeded by Megara with "11:11"
