= Arva =

Arva, Árva, ARVA or Arvas may refer to:

Current places

- Arva, Ontario, Middlesex Centre, Ontario, Canada
- Arva, Iran, a village in Ardabil Province, Iran
- Arvagh or Arva, County Cavan, Ireland
- Arva River, tributary of the Milcov River in Romania
- Orava (region) (Hungarian Árva), in Slovakia and Poland
- Aladangady or Arva, Karnataka, India
- Arva, village in Valea Călugărească, Prahova, Romania
- Arva, village in Broșteni, Vrancea, Romania

Historical places

- Árva County, Kingdom of Hungary
- Arba (Achaea), ancient Greece

People

- Gábor Árva, Hungarian canoeist
- Serhat Arvas, Turkish action movie filmographer
- Arva, pseudonym for one of The Kransky Sisters

Other

- Arva (moth), a synonym of the moth genus Aroa
- Arva, Marquesan name for Kava, a mild narcotic
- Arvas, Norwegian black metal band
- Avalanche transceiver, beacon or ARVA
