= Francesco Maria Marini =

Italian Baroque composer (fl. 1637)

Francesco Maria Marini (fl. 1637) was an Italian composer of early Baroque music. Associated with the music of San Marino, only a single work of his survives, the 1637 collection Concerti spirituali concertati a 2–7 et con instrumenti, libro 1.

== Life and career ==
There is little known of Francesco Maria Marini; he lived around 1637. The frontispiece of his surviving music indicates that he was born in Pesaro.

He is known to have been music director for the Republic of San Marino's most important church.

== Music ==
Although only a single set of his compositions survives, the British musicologist Jerome Roche remarks "That so few works survive is a matter for regret, since they show a surprisingly competent talent for a comparative outpost such as San Marino, geographically far removed from the centres of composition in the 1630s".

=== Editions ===
- Marini, Francesco Maria (31 October 2018). Hunt, Janet E. (ed.). Francesco Maria Marini: Concerti Spirituali, Libro Primo (1637). Motets for Two, Three or Four Voices and Basso Continuo. Framingham: Hunt Music. ISBN 978-0-9962221-6-7.
