= Like an Animal (Piqued Jacks song) =

2023 single by Piqued Jacks

Single by Piqued Jacks
- Released: 5 April 2023
- Label: BMG
- Songwriters: Andrea Lazzeretti; Francesco Bini; Marco Sgaramella; Tommaso Oliveri
- Producer: Piqued Jacks

Piqued Jacks singles chronology
"Sunflower" (2022)	"Like an Animal" (2023)	"Color Shades" (2023)

Music video
- "Like an Animal" on YouTube

Eurovision Song Contest 2023 entry
- Country: San Marino
- Artist: Piqued Jacks
- Language: English
- Composers: Andrea Lazzeretti; Francesco Bini; Marco Sgaramella; Tommaso Oliveri
- Lyricists: Andrea Lazzeretti; Francesco Bini; Marco Sgaramella; Tommaso Oliveri

Finals performance
- Semi-final result: 16th
- Semi-final points: 0

Entry chronology
- ◄ "Stripper" (2022)
- "11:11" (2024) ►

Official performance video
- "Like an Animal" (Second Semi-Final) on YouTube

"Like an Animal" is a song by Italian alternative rock band Piqued Jacks, released as a single on 5 April 2023. The song represented San Marino in the Eurovision Song Contest 2023 after winning Una voce per San Marino, the Sammarinese national final for that year's Eurovision Song Contest.

== Eurovision Song Contest ==
=== Una voce per San Marino ===
Una voce per San Marino was the national selection used by San Marino RTV (SMRTV), the Sammarinese broadcaster for the Eurovision Song Contest to select the Eurovision entry for the Eurovision Song Contest 2023. A submission period was opened by SMRTV on 20 August 2022 for emerging artists and composers to submit their entries. Near the close of the submission period, SMRTV reported that they had received over 1,000 applications overall, out of which 299 were selected to take part in the emerging acts round. The emerging acts auditions took place during scheduled dates between 28 October 2022 and 27 January 2023. From 20 to 24 February 2022, a series of four semi-finals would decide the 22 acts that will move on to the final.

As an emerging artist, Piqued Jacks would audition to earn a spot in the semi-finals. On 20 February, they were announced as one of 104 artists that had made the cutoff for the semi-finals. "Like an Animal" was placed into the third semi-final, where it would perform last out of 23 songs in the semi-final. The song was voted to advance directly to the final.

In the final, the song was drawn to perform sixth in the final out of 21 entries. At the end of the show's voting, it was revealed that the song had won, thus earning a spot as the Sammarinese representative for the Eurovision Song Contest 2023.

=== At Eurovision ===
According to Eurovision rules, all nations with the exceptions of the host country and the "Big Five" (France, Germany, Italy, Spain and the United Kingdom) are required to qualify from one of two semi-finals in order to compete for the final; the top ten countries from each semi-final progress to the final. The European Broadcasting Union (EBU) split up the competing countries into five different pots based on voting patterns from previous contests, with countries with favourable voting histories put into the same pot. On 31 January 2023, an allocation draw was held which placed each country into one of the two semi-finals, and determined which half of the show they would perform in. San Marino was placed into the second semi-final, which was held on 11 May 2023, performing in the second half of the show. In the semi-final, they would perform 12th, finishing last in a tiebreaker with Romania that was determined by the running order of the semi-final. As both entries had gotten zero points, and Romania had gone earlier than San Marino, "Like an Animal" was given last as the song was performed later in the semi-final.
