= Serhat Arvas =

Turkish film director

Serhat Arvas (born 2 June 1983) is a Turkish action movie film director and head of a martial arts stunt team.

== Biography ==
Arvas was born in Istanbul on 2 June 1983. He completed his primary and high school education in Fatih (one of the central districts of Istanbul). He was attracted by the eastern martial arts at the age of 8 just after the movies he had watched. In the beginning his training was not going beyond trying freestyle with his friends but when he was 10 he decided to improve himself on a discipline.

He'd improved himself in 7 different martial art disciplines including Full-Contact, kung fu, wushu and aikido. With the ability and passion to martial arts he started educating senior classes at a very young age.

In 2001 he founded "Yıldırım Stunt Team". The team made a short film named Eagles Claw.

Furthermore, to accomplish his dream of making Turkish action films by combining cinema with eastern martial arts, Arvas took acting and diction lessons at Müjdat Gezen Acting School in 2002, then continued his education at İstanbul Metropolitan Municipality Performance Arts Center.

In 2003 Yıldırım Stunt Team was disbanded. Arvas took on a side role in the well-known Turkish serial called Kurtlar Vadisi in 2004.

As intending to give fight scenes a more professional look in his movies, he formed "Serhat Arvas Stunt Team" in late 2004. He also continued his studies on arranging fight scenes, fight choreographies, stunting, camera angles and action in cinema. Team’s first short feature project called Fists of Vengeance highly drew public attention. Lately, they are having the proud of their feature film named Fearless Tiger whose screenplay belongs to Arvas and also directed by himself.

== Filmography ==
- 2002 – short film (Action) : "Eagles Claw" – actor and director
- 2003 – short film (Action) : "One day in Istanbul" – actor
- 2004 – short film (Action) : "Fists of Vengeance" – actor and director
- 2004 – TV-series (in Turkey): "Valley of the Wolves" (Kurtlar vadisi) – accessory actor
- 2005 – long film (Action) : "Fearless Tiger" (Korkusuz kaplan) – actor, director, martial arts and action choreographer
- 2006 – short film (Horror) : "Nightmare in Blood" – actor and director
- 2006 – short film (Horror) : "Neurotic" – director
- 2006 – short film (Horror) : "Nemesis" – director
- 2007 – TV series ( Advertorial) : "Akbank-axess cart" – actor
- 2008 – "Mr.KILINK" – actor
- 2008 – "DELI DUMRUL" – actor
- 2008 – "TARGET:5" – actor and director
