= Teatro Titano =

Theatre in San Marino, Republic of San Marino

- Interactive map of Teatro Titano
- Address: Piazza Sant'Agata, 5 City of San Marino; San Marino
- Coordinates: 43.934603°N 12.447582°E
- Owner: Cultural Institutes of the Republic of San Marino
- Capacity: 315 seated

Construction
- Built: 1750-1773
- Opened: 1773
- Renovated: 1936

Website
- Official website

The Teatro Titano is a theatre located in the City of San Marino. It was built in 1750 and was renovated in 1936. The theatre has a capacity of 315 seats.

== See also ==
- City of San Marino
