= Serhat =

Serhat is a masculine given name of Turkish origin. Notable people with the name include:

== Given name ==
- Serhat (singer) (born 1964), Turkish singer, producer, and television presenter
- Serhat Ahmetoğlu (born 2002), Turkish footballer
- Serhat Akın (born 1981), Turkish footballer
- Serhat Akyüz (born 1984), Turkish footballer
- Serhat Arvas (born 1983), Turkish film director
- Serhat Balcı (born 1982), Turkish sport wrestler
- Serhat Baran (born 1974), Turkish musician
- Serhat Çakmak (born 1995), Turkish footballer
- Serhat Caradee, Turkish-Australian film director
- Serhat Çetin (born 1986), Turkish basketball player
- Serhat Coşkun (born 1987), Turkish volleyball player
- Serhat Durmus (born 1998), Turkish producer, DJ, singer, and songwriter
- Serhat Guler, Turkish boxer
- Serhat Güller (born 1968), Turkish football manager and player
- Serhat Gülpınar (born 1979), Turkish footballer
- Serhat Kılıç (1975–2026), Turkish actor and TV-radio presenter
- Serhat Koç (born 1990), Dutch-Turkish footballer
- Serhat Köksal (born 1990), Dutch footballer
- Serhat Koruk (born 1996), German footballer
- Serhat Kot (born 1997), Turkish footballer
- Serhat Sağat (born 1983), Turkish footballer
- Serhat Tasdemir (born 2000), British-Azerbaijani footballer
- Serhat Teoman (born 1983), Turkish actor
- Serhat Tutumluer (born 1972), Turkish actor
- Serhat Ulueren (born 1969), Turkish journalist
- Serhat Yapıcı (born 1988), Turkish-German footballer

== See also ==
- Serhat, Bayramiç
