= Senhit (singer) =

Italian singer (born 1979)

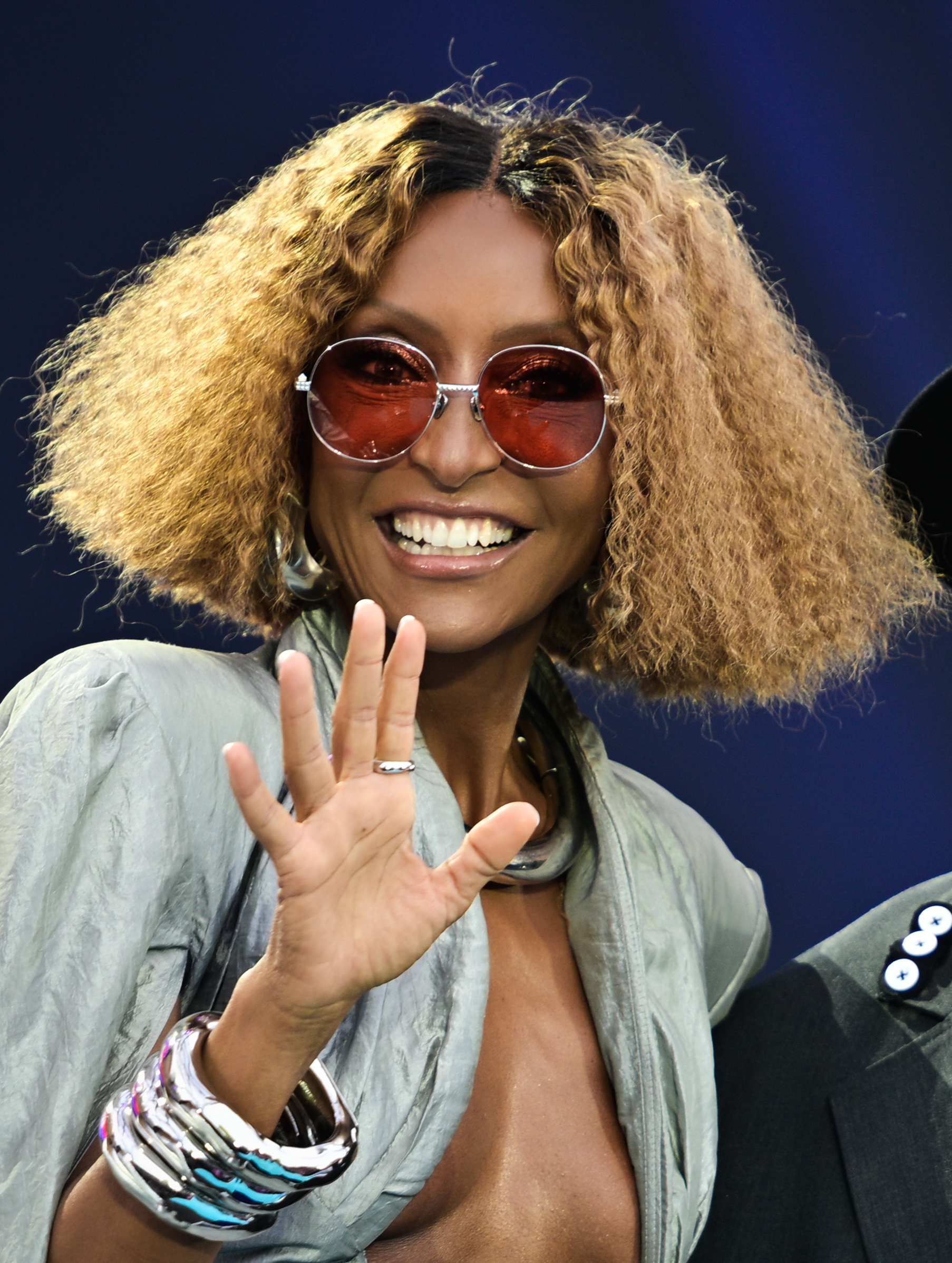
- Senhit in 2026

Background information
- Also known as: Senit
- Born: Senhit Zadik Zadik; 1 October 1979 (age 46); Bologna, Italy
- Genres: Pop
- Years active: 2001–present
- Website: senhit.com

Senhit Zadik Zadik (born 1 October 1979), known mononymously as Senhit (formerly written as Senit), is an Italian singer. She has represented San Marino in the Eurovision Song Contest three times, in 2011 with the song "Stand By", in 2021 with "Adrenalina", and in 2026 with "Superstar". She was also due to represent San Marino in the cancelled 2020 contest with the song "Freaky!".

== Biography ==
Senhit was born and raised in Bologna to Eritrean parents. She started her career abroad. She performed in musicals like Fame, The Lion King and Hair in Switzerland and Germany.

In 2002, she returned to Italy and began her climb to fame in the Italian music business releasing her debut album the self-titled Senit in 2006 and her second album Un tesoro è necessariamente nascosto in 2007 with the three singles "La mia città è cambiata", "La cosa giusta" and "La faccia che ho". In 2009, Senhit released her third album, the English language So High. Three more singles were released off of the record: "Work Hard", "No More" and "Party on the Dance Floor".

Following her participation in Eurovision in 2011, she released a new pop single titled "Through the Rain" on 22 June 2011. In 2014, she became a regular guest on the Canale 5 Sunday show "Domenica Live" and decided to be referred to as Senhit, marking a new phase in her career.

== Eurovision Song Contest ==
Senhit represented San Marino in the Eurovision Song Contest 2011 in Düsseldorf with the song "Stand By". The song placed 16th out of 19 in one of the Semi-Finals, and as a result, it did not qualify for the final.

She would have represented San Marino again at the Eurovision Song Contest 2020 in Rotterdam with the song "Freaky!". However, the contest was cancelled due to the COVID-19 pandemic.

Senhit represented San Marino again at the Eurovision Song Contest 2021 with a new song, "Adrenalina". The official music video featured a rap section by the American artist Flo Rida. However, Team San Marino behind the entry declared that "Flo Rida has been part of the production and is featured in the music video, but it's yet to be decided if he will take part on stage in Rotterdam. The rap part will either way remain." On 18 May 2021, ahead of the first semi-final, the San Marino delegation confirmed that Flo Rida would be joining Senhit on stage in Rotterdam. San Marino was the first country to perform in the second semi-final of the contest, where they finished 9th place with 118 points, qualifying the country for the final. In the final, held on 22 May 2021, they were the last to perform, and finished 22nd with 50 points.

On 8 March 2026, she won San Marino Song Contest 2026, the Sanmarinese national selection for the Eurovision Song Contest 2026, and qualified to represent San Marino for the third time, with the song "Superstar", which was performed alongside English singer Boy George. The song failed to qualify in the first semi-final.

=== Freaky Trip to Rotterdam ===
Leading up to her participation in Eurovision 2021, Senhit released monthly covers of previous Eurovision songs as part of her #FreakyTripToRotterdam series, giving them new interpretations and perspective in collaboration with Luca Tomassini who directed the videos. The series ran from July 2020 to May 2021. The 11-song collection included:

Chapter	Song	Original performer	Country of entry	Year of competition	Music video
1	"Cheesecake"	TEO	Belarus	2014	
2	"Everyway That I Can"	Sertab Erener	Turkey	2003	
3	"Ding-a-dong"	Teach-In	Netherlands	1975	
4	"Congratulations"	Cliff Richard	United Kingdom	1968	
5	"Rise Like a Phoenix"	Conchita Wurst	Austria	2014	
6	"Amar pelos dois"	Salvador Sobral	Portugal	2017	
7	"Waterloo"	ABBA	Sweden	1974	
8	"Alcohol Is Free"	Koza Mostra & Agathonas Iakovidis	Greece	2013	
9	"Golden Boy"	Nadav Guedj	Israel	2015	
9	"Toy"	Netta	Israel	2018	
10	"Roi"	Bilal Hassani	France	2019	
11	"Bandido"	Azúcar Moreno	Spain	1990	

After the contest, Senhit released one more #FreakyTripToRotterdam video, featuring her entry "Adrenalina". The video showed her adventures through Rotterdam, and behind the scenes material from her time at the contest.

== Discography ==
=== Albums ===
Title	Details
Senit	Released: 2006; Format: Digital download, CD; Label: Panini S.p.a.
Un tesoro è necessariamente nascosto	Released: 2007; Format: Digital download, CD; Label: Panini S.p.a.
So High	Released: 2009; Format: Digital download, CD; Label: Panini S.p.a.
Dangerous	Released: 2024; Format: Digital download; Label: Panini S.p.a.

=== Extended plays ===
Title	Details
Hey Buddy	Released: 30 June 2017; Format: Digital download, CD; Label: Panini S.p.a.

=== Singles ===
Title	Year	Peak chart positions				Album
Title	Year	LIT	NLD	SWE	UK Down.	Album
"La mia città è cambiata"	2005	—	—	—	—	Senit
"La faccia che ho"	2007	—	—	—	—	Un tesoro è necessariamente nascosto
"Io non dormo"	2007	—	—	—	—	Un tesoro è necessariamente nascosto
"No More"	2009	—	—	—	—	So High
"Party on the Dance Floor"	2010	—	—	—	—	So High
"Stand By"	2011	—	—	—	—	Non-album singles
"Through the Rain"	2011	—	—	—	—	Non-album singles
"AOK"	2013	—	—	—	—	Non-album singles
"Relations"	2014	—	—	—	—	Non-album singles
"Don't Call Me"	2014	—	—	—	—	Non-album singles
"Rock Me Up"	2014	—	—	—	—	Non-album singles
"Something on Your Mind"	2017	—	—	—	—	Hey Buddy
"Higher"	2017	—	—	—	—	Hey Buddy
"Dark Room"	2019	—	—	—	—	Non-album singles
"Un Bel Niente" / "Obsessed"	2019	—	—	—	—	Non-album singles
"Heartache"	2019	—	—	—	—	Non-album singles
"Freaky!"	2020	—	—	—	—	Non-album singles
"Breathe"	2020	—	—	—	—	Dangerous
"Adrenalina" (solo or featuring Flo Rida)	2021	39	79	80	99	Dangerous
"Follow Me" (featuring Tory Lanez)	2022	—	—	—	—	Dangerous
"Jesus Oh What A Wonderful Child"	2022	—	—	—	—	Non-album single
"Try To Love You"	2022	—	—	—	—	Dangerous
"Pow"	2023	—	—	—	—	Dangerous
"I Am What I Am"	2023	—	—	—	—	Non-album single
"Colombia"	2024	—	—	—	—	Dangerous

Awards and achievements
Preceded by Miodio with "Complice"	San Marino in the Eurovision Song Contest; 2011	Succeeded by Valentina Monetta with "The Social Network Song"
Preceded by Serhat with "Say Na Na Na'"	San Marino in the Eurovision Song Contest; 2020 (cancelled)	Succeeded by Herself and Flo Rida with "Adrenalina"
Preceded by Herself with "Freaky!"	San Marino in the Eurovision Song Contest; 2021 (with Flo Rida)	Succeeded by Achille Lauro with "Stripper"
Preceded by Gabry Ponte with "Tutta l'Italia"	San Marino in the Eurovision Song Contest; 2026 (with Boy George)	Succeeded by TBD
