= Stripper (song) =

2022 single by Achille Lauro

Single by Achille Lauro
- Language: Italian, English
- Released: 4 March 2022
- Genre: Punk rock; post-punk; pop rock
- Length: 2:53
- Label: Warner Music Italy
- Songwriters: Lauro De Marinis; Daniele Dezi; Daniele Mungai; Davide Petrella; Federico De Marinis; Francesco Viscovo; Gregorio Calculli; Marco Lanciotti; Matteo Ciceroni; Mattia Cutolo; Simon Pietro Manzari

Music video
- "Stripper" on YouTube

Eurovision Song Contest 2022 entry
- Country: San Marino
- Artist: Achille Lauro
- Language: Italian

Finals performance
- Semi-final result: 14th
- Semi-final points: 50

Entry chronology
- ◄ "Adrenalina" (2021)
- "Like an Animal" (2023) ►

"Stripper" is a song by Italian rapper and singer Achille Lauro. The song represented San Marino in the Eurovision Song Contest 2022 in Turin, Italy, after winning Una voce per San Marino, the Sammarinese national final.

== Background ==
According to Lauro, "Stripper" is a punk rock song. Lauro describes the song as a "feminist anthem", based on "the duality of man and woman... It's about feeling like a woman and not worrying about outside judgment."

== Eurovision Song Contest ==
=== Una voce per San Marino ===
On 22 September 2021, SMRTV revealed that the event would be held between December 2021 and February 2022. All competing artists were initially divided into two categories: Emerging and Established. Established artists, also nine in total, were directly invited to the final by Media Evolution SRL. From 13 to 17 February 2022, a series of semi-finals decided the nine Emerging acts that moved on to the Grand Final to join the ten already-selected Established artists, with the top three of the Grand Final also being awarded €1000, €2000 and €7000, respectively. On 8 February 2022, SMRTV announced the identity of the ten Established artists that qualified automatically for the final in their category, with Lauro being one of the ten revealed.

The Grand Final took place on 19 February 2022 at the Teatro Nuovo in Dogana. A total of 18 artists participated, nine from the Emerging section and nine from the Big section. A jury decided the top three, with the winner going on to represent the country at Eurovision 2022. The jury consisted of: Mogol (songwriter; jury president), Simon Lee (conductor, composer and arranger), Clarissa Martinelli (radio presenter), Susanne Georgi (2009 Andorran representative) and Dino Stewart (managing director at BMG Italy). Lauro would manage to win the final by one point, becoming San Marino's representative for the Eurovision Song Contest 2022.

=== At Eurovision ===
According to Eurovision rules, all nations with the exceptions of the host country and the "Big Five" (France, Germany, Italy, Spain and the United Kingdom) are required to qualify from one of two semi-finals in order to compete for the final; the top ten countries from each semi-final progress to the final. The European Broadcasting Union (EBU) split up the competing countries into six different pots based on voting patterns from previous contests, with countries with favourable voting histories put into the same pot. On 25 January 2022, an allocation draw was held which placed each country into one of the two semi-finals, as well as which half of the show they would perform in. San Marino was placed into the second semi-final, held on 12 May 2022, and performed in seventh place, in the first half of the show.

== Charts ==
Chart performance for "Stripper"
Chart (2022)	Peak position
Lithuania (AGATA)	83
San Marino (SMRRTV Top 50)	19
