= Freaky! =

2020 song by Senhit

Single by Senhit
- Released: 9 March 2020
- Length: 3:00
- Label: Panini; Artist First
- Songwriter(s): Gianluigi Fazio; Henrik Steen Hansen; Nanna Bottos

Senhit singles chronology
| "Obsessed" (2020) | "Freaky!" (2020) | "Breathe" (2020) |

Eurovision Song Contest 2020 entry
- Country: San Marino
- Artist(s): Senhit
- Language: English
- Composer(s): Gianluigi Fazio; Henrik Steen Hansen; Nanna Bottos
- Lyricist(s): Gianluigi Fazio; Henrik Steen Hansen; Nanna Bottos

Finals performance
- Semi-final result: Contest cancelled

Entry chronology
- ◄ "Say Na Na Na" (2019)
- "Adrenalina" (2021) ►

"Freaky!" is a song by Italian singer Senhit. It was selected to be the entrant for San Marino in the Eurovision Song Contest 2020 on 9 March 2020, after Senhit was internally selected to represent the country.

== Background ==
The song was written by Gianluigi Fazio, Henrik Steen Hansen and Nanna Bottos. It was selected to represent San Marino in the Eurovision Song Contest 2020 in an online vote.

== Eurovision Song Contest ==
After Senhit was internally selected to represent San Marino in the Eurovision Song Contest 2020, an online vote was used to select which song she would perform. On 9 March 2020, it was announced that 'Freaky!' won the selection. On 28 January 2020, a special allocation draw was held which placed each country into one of the two semi-finals, as well as which half of the show they would perform in. San Marino was placed into the second semi-final, to be held on 14 May 2020, and was scheduled to perform in the first half of the show.
