= Teatro Nuovo (Serravalle) =

Theatre and cinema in San Marino

New Theatre
- Teatro Nuovo
- Interactive map of New Theatre
- Address: Piazza Marino Tini, 7 Dogana; San Marino
- Coordinates: 43°58′57.92″N 12°29′26.29″E
- Capacity: 872

Website
- Teatro Nuovo

The Teatro Nuovo (New Theatre) is a theatre of the Republic of San Marino located in Dogana, a town in the Serravalle municipality ("castello"), not far from the border with Italy. It has a capacity of 872 seats of which 604 are in the stalls and is the largest theatre in the republic.

== Events ==
On 22 September 2021, Sammarinese broadcaster, San Marino RTV (SMRTV), announced that the Teatro Nuovo would host the Grand Final of Una Voce per San Marino ("A Voice for San Marino"), the Sammarinese national final for the Eurovision Song Contest 2022. The final took place on 19 February 2022. The theatre was used throughout the 3 editions of Una Voce Per San Marino, and continues to be used for 'San Marino Song Contest'
