= Adrenalina (Senhit song) =

2021 song by Senhit

Single by Senhit

from the album Dangerous
- Released: 8 March 2021
- Length: 2:51
- Label: Panini
- Songwriter(s): Chanel Tukia; Tramar Dillard; Jimmy "Joker" Thörnfeldt; Joy Deb; Kenny Silverdique; Linnea Deb; Malou Linn Eloise Ruotsalainen; Senhit Zadik Zadik; Suzi Pancenkov; Thomas Stengaard
- Producer(s): Jimmy Joker; Joy Deb; Thomas Stengaard

Senhit singles chronology
"Breathe" (2020)	"Adrenalina" (2021)	"Follow Me" (2022)

Music video
- "Adrenalina" on YouTube

Flo Rida singles chronology
"Take a Shot and Make a TikTok" (2020)	"Adrenalina" (2021)	"Summer's Not Ready" (2021)

Eurovision Song Contest 2021 entry
- Country: San Marino
- Artist(s): Senhit
- Language: English

Finals performance
- Semi-final result: 9th
- Semi-final points: 118
- Final result: 22nd
- Final points: 50

Entry chronology
- ◄ "Freaky!" (2020)
- "Stripper" (2022) ►

"Adrenalina" is a song by Italian singer Senhit, released on 8 March 2021 through Panini S.p.A. The song represented San Marino in the Eurovision Song Contest 2021 in Rotterdam, the Netherlands. The song features uncredited vocals from American rapper Flo Rida. A new revamped version featuring credited vocals from Flo Rida was released on 12 March 2021.

== Eurovision Song Contest ==
=== Internal selection ===
On 16 May 2020, San Marino RTV confirmed that Senhit would represent San Marino in the 2021 contest. A snippet of Senhit's entry was released on 7 March 2021, revealing that Flo Rida would be featured in the song. However Team San Marino behind the entry declared that "Flo Rida has been part of the production and is featured in the music video, but it's yet to be decided if he will take part on stage in Rotterdam. The rap part will either way remain."

=== At Eurovision ===
The 65th edition of the Eurovision Song Contest took place in Rotterdam, the Netherlands and consisted of two semi-finals on 18 May and 20 May 2021, and the grand final on 22 May 2021. According to the Eurovision rules, all participating countries, except the host nation and the "Big Five", consisting of France, Germany, Italy, Spain and the United Kingdom, are required to qualify from one of two semi-finals to compete for the final, although the top 10 countries from the respective semi-final progress to the grand final. On 17 November 2020, it was announced that San Marino would be performing in the first half of the second semi-final of the contest.

==== Flo Rida in Eurovision ====
After much speculation about whether Flo Rida would perform in person, it was officially announced on 18 May 2021, just two days before Senhit was due to take part in the second semi-final on 20 May, that Flo Rida had arrived in Rotterdam and would join Senhit onstage.

== Track listing ==
Digital download
No.	Title	Length
1.	"Adrenalina"	2:51
2.	"Adrenalina" (karaoke version)	2:51

Digital download
No.	Title	Length
1.	"Adrenalina" (featuring Flo Rida)	2:59

== Charts ==
Chart performance for "Adrenalina"
Chart (2021)	Peak position
Belgium (Ultratip Bubbling Under Flanders)	29
Greece International (IFPI)	66
Iceland (Tónlistinn)	33
Lithuania (AGATA)	39
Netherlands (Single Top 100)	79
Sweden (Sverigetopplistan)	80
UK Singles Downloads (OCC)	99
